= Bula (horse) =

British National Hunt racehorse (1965–1977)

- Sire: Raincheck
- Grandsire: Tourbillon
- Dam: Pongo's Fancy
- Damsire: Golden Chain
- Sex: Gelding
- Foaled: 1965
- Country: Ireland
- Colour: Brown
- Owner: Captain Bill Edwards-Heathcote
- Trainer: Fred Winter
- Record: 51: 34 wins
- Earnings: £69,672

Major wins
- Gloucestershire Hurdle (Div II) (1970); Osborne Hurdle (1970, 1972); Benson & Hedges Handicap Hurdle (1970); Mill House Hurdle (1971, 1973); Kingwell Hurdle (1971, 1972); Champion Hurdle (1971, 1972); Welsh Champion Hurdle (1971); Skeaping Trophy Hurdle (1971); Cheltenham Trial Hurdle (1972); Black and White Whiskey Gold Cup (1973); Benson & Hedges Novices' Chase (1973); Fairlawne Chase (1975, 1976); Sundew Chase (1975, 1976); Gainsborough Chase (1976); Timeform rating: 176

Awards
- Champion NH Horse: 1970–1971, 1971–1972

Honours
- former Bula Hurdle at Cheltenham (now International Hurdle)
- Last updated on 7 December 2022

Bula (1965–1977) was a British National Hunt horse who won the Champion Hurdle twice and many other top races over hurdles and later over fences. One of the greatest hurdlers ever, he ran during what is considered a golden period for two-mile hurdlers in the 1970s. Bula was "a remarkably consistent, versatile and durable jumper" and was known for his come-from-behind style. At one stage Bula had an unbeaten run of 13 races.

== Background ==
Bula was a brown gelding sired by Raincheck, who had run unplaced in the 1951 Derby and was a son of Prix du Jockey Club winner Tourbillion. Bula’s dam Pongo’s Fancy was a winner over hurdles and the great granddaughter of Triple Crown winner Gainsborough. Bula was bought by Captain Bill Edwards-Heathcote in Dublin in 1968 for 1,350 guineas, and subsequently put into training with Fred Winter in the summer of 1969.

Upon arrival at Winter’s yard, Bula "looked more like a warhorse than a racehorse". He was also known for being a bit of a tearaway on the training gallops and was described as "a lunatic" by his stable lad Vincent Brooks.

== Career ==
=== 1969/1970 Season: Novice Hurdling ===
Bula made his racing debut in the Chaldon Novices’ Hurdle (Div II) at Lingfield in November. Although he jumped the first three flights poorly, he easily overtook the leaders to win by six lengths under jockey Stan Mellor. He followed up in similar style a week later at Worcester, before completing a three timer in novice hurdles at Wincanton.

Bula next ran in the second division of the Gloucestershire Hurdle at the Cheltenham Festival in March. Sent off the 7/2 favourite, he rounded off his novice campaign in winning by six lengths from Odeum, bringing his winning streak to six.

=== 1970/1971 Season: Hurdling ===
Bula continued his winning ways the following season. He began his campaign in the Osborne Hurdle at Windsor, winning by half a length from Corrieghoil under 12 st 7 lbs. Nine days later, he fought to beat Dondieu by a head in the Jane Drewery Memorial Hurdle but showed his turn of foot in the Benson & Hedges Hurdle at Sandown, where he passed six horses after the final flight to beat Moyne Royal by a short head. Far back in the field was future Schweppes Gold Trophy winner Cala Mesquida, who received 21 lbs from Bula.

Bula reappeared in February in the Mill House Hurdle at Towcester, which he won by fifteen lengths from El Mighty. His next race involved meeting three-time Champion Hurdle winner Persian War in the Kingwell Hurdle at Wincanton. Bula emerged triumphantly from the match, beating Flower Picker by one and a half lengths with Persian War, who had suffered from a temperature, ten lengths back in third.

Bula’s next target was the Champion Hurdle itself back at the Cheltenham Festival. Among field of nine, the smallest since 1953, were Persian War, that horse’s old rival Major Rose, Moyne Royal and Dondieu, and Bula was rated the 15/8 favourite. Persian War and Major Rose dueled from the second last hurdle, but Bula went with them and accelerated after the last to win by four lengths. The former champion was second.

Bula confirmed his dominance over his contemporaries by winning the Welsh Champion Hurdle under 12 st from True Luck (receiving 16 lbs) and Persian War back in third.

Bula had won thirteen races in a row and was voted the Champion NH Horse for the 1970/1971 season.

=== 1971/1972 Season: Hurdling ===
Bula suffered a defeat on his return in the Autumn, finishing second by a neck to I’m Happy in the Woolton Hill Hurdle at Newbury after making a mistake at the last flight.

He returned to winning ways in the Skeaping Trophy Hurdle at Sandown, but badly bruised a foreleg in the process and missed nearly four months of racing.

Bula returned to racing in February and, despite the layoff, won the Kingwell Hurdle for the second time by four lengths hard held from Irish Sweeps winner Kelanne.

Despite the interrupted campaign, Bula’s Kingwell win confirmed his well-being and he was rated an 8/11 favourite to win his second Champion Hurdle. This year, he faced two former Triumph Hurdle winners in Varma and Boxer, dual Christmas Hurdle winner Coral Diver, Cheltenham Trial and Christmas Hurdle winner Canasta Lad and the re-opposing pair of Dondieu and Kelanne. As was the norm, Bula was held up at the back of the field as Varma and Boxer made all the running. Racing down the hill, Paul Kelleway on Bula decided to move to the inside and follow Boxer rather than Dondieu as they had been doing. At the third last flight, Dondieu fell and broke his neck while causing severe interference. Bula avoided the incident and strode past Boxer to win by eight lengths in a "triumphal procession". However, his win was somewhat overshadowed by the fatal fall of Dondieu.

In Bula’s next race, he was beaten in an upset by Canasta Lad, who had fallen in the Champion Hurdle. In the soft ground and under top weight, Bula was under pressure from the second last and lost by three quarters of a length.

Despite this loss, Bula was overwhelmingly voted as Champion NH Horse for the second year running, receiving 37 out of 39 votes.

=== 1972/1973 Season: Hurdling ===
The next season, Bula started off by walking over in the Osborne Hurdle, before gaining revenge on Canasta Lad by eight lengths in the Kirk and Kirk Hurdle over two and a half miles at Ascot. He then easily won the Cheltenham Trial Hurdle by one and a half lengths from the same rival. In third that day was Comedy Of Errors, who went on to be a Champion Hurdler.

For Bula’s next race, he travelled over to Ireland to run in the Sweeps Hurdle at Leopardstown. Under top weight of 12 st, he finished fourth behind Captain Christy, Comedy Of Errors and Brendon’s Road. Bula regaining the winning thread in the Mill House Hurdle and Kingwell Hurdle, winning both races before heading to Cheltenham for an attempt at emulating Persian War and winning a third Champion Hurdle.

By virtue of his record, Bula was a short-priced favourite to win the race, and all bar one tipster made him their selection ahead of Comedy Of Errors. In the race, both fancied horses were held up at the back of the field, but while Comedy Of Errors made smooth progress to overtake the leaders, Bula was under pressure from some way out and finished fifth behind his rival.

Although some thought that Bula had run below his best that day, Comedy Of Errors won the Welsh Champion Hurdle, where he defeated the former champion by four lengths while conceding him 6 lbs.

=== 1973/1974 Season: Novice Chasing ===
After his hurdling defeats, Fred Winter decided to send Bula chasing, a discipline that he took to immediately despite being relatively old to begin chasing. In his first race over fences, he won the Wilderwick Novices’ Chase at Lingfield by twelve lengths, and followed up by winning the Black and White Whisky Gold Cup at Ascot by twenty lengths. In the latter race, his main rival had been Captain Christy who went on to win that season’s Gold Cup as a novice), but he unseated at the second last fence, leaving Bula to win.

Bula then won the Bath Novices' Chase at Cheltenham by four lengths and, despite a mix up with the entry system, the Benson & Hedges Novices Chase by fifteen lengths at Sandown. In his next race, the Stones Ginger Wine Chase at Sandown, Bula fell at the fourteenth fence but bounced back in his final race of the season, the Geoffrey Gilbey Memorial Chase at Newbury, where he beat Notification by six lengths.

=== 1974/1975 Season: Chasing ===
Bula had a somewhat mixed campaign this season. He did not race until January after suffering an injury but beat top-class chaser Tingle Creek at Sandown, the course where he usually dominated. He then followed that up with a five-length defeat of Royal Relief and Arkle Trophy winner Canasta Lad in a two-mile chase at Sandown.

In the Newbury Spring Handicap Chase, Shock Result beat not only Bula, who had been odds on to win, but Bula’s top-class stablemate Pendil, a dual winner of the King George VI Chase. Bula then stepped up in trip to three miles in the Fairlawne Chase at Windsor, where he defeated Royal Relief and Manicou Bay by eight lengths.

Having proven that he could stay three miles, Bula was entered into the Cheltenham Gold Cup in an attempt to be the first horse to win that race after winning the Champion Hurdle. The heavy going took its toll on the field, and as Captain Christy and former Gold Cup winner The Dikler were pulled up, Bula made a vital mistake at the last and finished third by six lengths to Ten Up and Soothsayer. Some felt that without the jumping error and on better ground, Bula may well have won the race.

That effort may have left a mark on Bula, as he fell in his final race of the season behind Summerville in the Welsh Champion Chase.

=== 1975/1976 Season: Chasing ===
Bula returned in the Sundew Chase over three miles at Haydock, triumphing by eight lengths from Royal Relief and Grand National winner Red Rum. In the SBG Handicap Chase at Ascot, he finished third to L’Escargot's half-brother What A Buck while conceding 31 lbs.

In the King George VI Chase at Kempton on Boxing Day, he lost to old rival Captain Christy, who led the whole way and finished thirty lengths clear of the field.

Bula bounced back in the Gainsborough Chase at Sandown, where he beat former Gold Cup winner The Dikler by four lengths. He followed up by winning a second Fairlawne Chase by a distance from Last Trick in a two-horse race that had no betting.

The 1976 Gold Cup experienced a slight dearth of top-class staying chasers after Captain Christy and Pendil were injured and withdrawn. On better ground than the previous renewal, Bula was made the 6/4 favourite, but he laboured throughout the race and finished sixth to up-and-coming chaser Royal Frolic.

=== 1976/1977 Season: Chasing ===
Bula again won his season debut, the Jack White Chase at Market Rasen, by a distance from the Arkle winner Broncho. He then finished second by one length to Game Spirit in the Hermitage Chase after not jumping well.

Bula’s final career win came in the Sundew Chase, which he won by two and a half lengths from Summerville and Red Rum. His form appeared to deteriorate somewhat when he finished fourth to Royal Marshall in the King George and third to Master H in the Gainsborough Chase.

Back at Cheltenham, connections decided to race him over the short distance of the Two Mile Champion Chase rather than the Gold Cup. Sent off the 3/1 favourite, Bula got no further than the fifth fence, where he barely took off and suffered a heavy fall. He remained on the ground for many minutes before rising to his feet having suffered torn shoulder muscles.

=== Death ===
Although it seemed hopeful that Bula would recover from his injury, over the next two months his condition worsened until his whole leg was nearly paralysed. He was put down in May.

Bula won 34 races over hurdles and fences and earned £69,672 over eight seasons of racing. Upon the announcement of his death, Cheltenham Racecourse announced that they had renamed the Cheltenham Trial Hurdle the Bula Hurdle in honour of the dual champion. Besides its namesake, the race has been won by the likes of Comedy Of Errors, Birds Nest, Sea Pigeon and Rooster Booster, and continues to be a key race for two-mile hurdlers.

== Assessment ==
In their book A Century of Champions, John Randall and Tony Morris rated Bula the sixth-best hurdler ever at 177, 5 lbs behind the highest rated hurdler, Night Nurse. Persian War, Monksfield, Comedy of Errors and Istabraq were the only other hurdlers rated higher. Timeform list the horse in their top ten of all time.

== Pedigree ==
Pedigree of Bula (IRE), brown gelding, 1965
Sire Raincheck (GB) 1948	Tourbillon (FR); 1928	Ksar	Bruleur
Sire Raincheck (GB) 1948	Tourbillon (FR); 1928	Ksar	Kizil Kourgan
Sire Raincheck (GB) 1948	Tourbillon (FR); 1928	Durban	Durbar
Sire Raincheck (GB) 1948	Tourbillon (FR); 1928	Durban	Banshee
Sire Raincheck (GB) 1948	Menue Monnaie (FR); 1926	Massine	Consols
Sire Raincheck (GB) 1948	Menue Monnaie (FR); 1926	Massine	Mauri
Sire Raincheck (GB) 1948	Menue Monnaie (FR); 1926	Argentee	As d'Atout
Sire Raincheck (GB) 1948	Menue Monnaie (FR); 1926	Argentee	Azalee
Dam Pongo's Fancy (IRE) 1955	Golden Chain (GB); 1944	St Michael	Gainsborough
Dam Pongo's Fancy (IRE) 1955	Golden Chain (GB); 1944	St Michael	Dulzura
Dam Pongo's Fancy (IRE) 1955	Golden Chain (GB); 1944	Link Lady (IRE)	Link Boy (GB)
Dam Pongo's Fancy (IRE) 1955	Golden Chain (GB); 1944	Link Lady (IRE)	Mintern
Dam Pongo's Fancy (IRE) 1955	Princess Brocade (IRE); 1950	River Prince (GB)	Rose Prince (FR)
Dam Pongo's Fancy (IRE) 1955	Princess Brocade (IRE); 1950	River Prince (GB)	Vieste
Dam Pongo's Fancy (IRE) 1955	Princess Brocade (IRE); 1950	Silk Gown	Sir Walter Raleigh (GB)
Dam Pongo's Fancy (IRE) 1955	Princess Brocade (IRE); 1950	Silk Gown	Tawaf (Family: 1-g)
