= Persian War (horse) =

British-bred Thoroughbred racehorse (1963–1984)

- Sire: Persian Gulf
- Grandsire: Bahram
- Dam: Warning
- Damsire: Chanteur
- Sex: Gelding
- Foaled: 1963
- Country: Britain
- Colour: Bay
- Breeder: Astor Studs
- Owner: Astor Studs; Donald Leyland-Naylor; Henry Alper
- Trainer: Tom Masson (1966); Brian Swift (1967); Colin Davies (1967-70); Arthur Pitt (1970-71); Denis Rayson (1971-72); Jack Gibson (1972-73)
- Record: (Hurdles) 51: 18-9-9

Major wins
- Victor Ludorum Juvenile Hurdle (1967); Triumph Hurdle (1967); Schweppes Gold Trophy (1968); Champion Hurdle (1968, 1969, 1970); Lonsdale Handicap Hurdle (1969); Welsh Champion Hurdle (1969); Irish Sweeps Hurdle (1970)

Honours
- Persian War Novices' Hurdle at Chepstow; Timeform rating: 179
- Last updated on 13 March 2025

Persian War (1963–1984) was a British-bred National Hunt horse and thrice winner of the Champion Hurdle at Cheltenham. He is considered one of the greatest hurdlers of all time. He won the Triumph Hurdle as a novice in 1967 before Champion Hurdle victories the next three years. He was rated the best hurdler since Sir Ken in the 1950s and described as “the ultimate champion” by trainer Colin Davis. Persian War's career was the start of ‘a golden age’ of two-mile hurdling in the 1970s. However, many observers felt that the horse could have accomplished even more if not for the interference of his owner Henry Alper, who employed six trainers to prepare him and often targeted unsuitable races.

== Background ==
Persian War was bred by Jakie Astor (The Honourable John Jacob Astor), later Sir John Astor, and was a big bay gelding. His sire, Persian Gulf, was a son of Triple Crown winner Bahram and had won the Coronation Cup in 1944. His dam, Warning, was a big boned daughter of champion sire Chanteur (also the winner of the Coronation Cup), and had produced Escort, who finished fourth in the Derby for Jakie Astor. Warning was not a product of the Astor Studs (from which most of Jakie's mares derived) but had been purchased by Jakie.

== Career ==
=== Early career ===
Persian War went into training with Astor's trainer, Dick Hern. Gelded as a 2yo, in an equine virus ravaged year Hern managed to win two small races with him at Salisbury and Wolverhampton as a three-year-old. He was sold out of Hern's yard to David Naylor-Leyland for 3,600 guineas and went into training with Tom Masson.

=== 1966/1967 season: novice hurdling ===
Persian War made his hurdling debut in October in a two-mile race at Ascot, where he finished second to Capablanca. He improved markedly in his next start, where he won the Toll House Juvenile Hurdle at Sandown by fifteen lengths from Major Imp, before romping by the same margin in the Freshmans Hurdle at Newbury. He returned to Newbury at the end of December for an eight-length win in the Kintbury Hurdle. It was this race that brought Persian War to the attention of Henry Alper, who immediately purchased him for £9,000, a then record price for a hurdler, and relocated him to Brian Swift’s yard at Epsom.

Under his new ownership, Persian War continued his winning ways with a six-length win the Challow Hurdle at Nebwury, a dogged half length victory in the Walton Hurdle at Kempton, and a seven-length triumph in the Victor Ludorum Juvenile Hurdle (then one of the most prestigious juvenile contests) at Haydock. He suffered a defeat at Kempton in the Friary Meux Gold Cup, when he misjudged a hurdle and struck his head on the ground, losing two teeth and gashing his tongue. Despite this, he finished third to Acrania and Te Fou.

Persian War confirmed his status as the best juvenile hurdler around with a win in the Triumph Hurdle at Cheltenham in April, where he reversed placings with Te Fou.

=== 1967/1968 season: hurdling ===
Persian War returned the following season with a twenty-five-length win in the Wyld Court Hurdle at Newbury, beating a field that included top class hurdler Mugatpura (future winner of the Fighting Fifth and Scottish Champion Hurdle). In his next race, he fell in the Lansdown 4YO Hurdle at Cheltenham behind Spanish Steps. Jockey Jimmy Uttley thought he was dead as he lay there, but Persian War soon recovered from the setback.

However, his season was hampered by an outbreak of foot and mouth, and Alper decided that Persian War should race in France for a time. When trainer Swift disagreed, Alper removed the horse from his care and sent him to Chantilly, where he contracted a bad chill and was in a poor state when he eventually returned to Britain. Now in the yard of Chepstow trainer Colin Davies, Persian War slowly returned to form with two placed efforts under big weights at Doncaster and Kempton.

He was then targeted at the Schweppes Gold Trophy at Newbury where, at only 5 years old, he was allotted top weight of 11 st 13 lbs against a field of thirty one rivals. Displaying all of his talent, Persian War beat the highly regarded Major Rose by half a length and set a weight-carrying record which has not been matched up to 2025.

Persian War then returned to Cheltenham as one of the favourites for the Champion Hurdle, with former winners Saucy Kit and Salmon Spray, Gloucestershire Hurdle winner Chorus, Cheltenham Trial Hurdle winner Sempervivum, and top class Mugatpura also in the field. It was rated the best Champion Hurdle for years, and on the firm ground Chorus was made favourite at 7/2 with Persian War second choice at 4/1. His fellow Alper owned stablemate Straight Point led the field with Persian War tracking. Running down the hill, Saucy Kit challenged Persian War before a bad mistake ended his effort and left Persian War clear. Chorus put in a good run at the last flight, but Persian War repelled him to win by four lengths. John Oaksey wrote of the win in Horse and Hound, “Here beyond argument was a truly great performance”.

Persian War's season ended with two thirds in France, behind Orvilliers in the Prix La Barka and Grande Course de Haies d’Auteuil (French Champion Hurdle).

=== 1968/1969 season ===
Again Persian War suffered an interrupted start to his season when he fell in his debut at Worcester and fractured his femur. He returned to the races in the Lonsdale Handicap Hurdle at Kempton in February. Despite being well below peak fitness, he carried 12 st 7 lbs and won by three lengths from Privy Seal (under 11 st 5 lbs) in an effort dubbed the finest performance since Arkle.

Persian War suffered a slight injury and a resulting temperature in the run up to his run in the Kingwell Hurdle at Wincanton, where he finished second to Boat Man while conceding him 16 lbs.

Persian War returned to his best in the Champion Hurdle, run this year on very heavy ground. Also in the field were Irish Champion Hurdle winner L’Escargot, who relished soft going, Sempervivum, Privy Seal, and former Triumph Hurdle winner England's Glory. The conditions took their toll on the field, with only five horses still in contention approaching the second last. Mud lover Drumikill momentarily looked dangerous before Persian War swept past to win by four lengths. Alper, who had reportedly won £25,000 in wagers, collapsed upon hearing the result.

He added to his record with a win in the Welsh Champion Hurdle on firm ground, beating Sempervivum by two lengths with old rival Te Fou back in third.

He travelled over to France for another attempt at the French Champion Hurdle, but after falling in the Prix La Barka, he was rested for the season.

=== 1969/1970 season ===
Against the advice of his trainer, Alper ran Persian War on the Flat in the Newbury Autumn Cup in September. The horse finished fourth in the two-mile race, badly jarred himself on the firm ground, and had to be rested.

Persian War returned to racing in December in the Gold Bond Hurdle at Sandown, where he finished second by five lengths to Escalus after swallowing his tongue. He next ran in the Irish Sweeps Hurdle at Fairyhouse but again suffered breathing issues (despite a tongue strap) and lost his position half a mile from home before battling to third place while conceding winner Normandy 12 lbs.

Persian War ran without the tongue strap at Haydock and recorded the worst finish of his career in seventh behind Tanlic while conceding over a stone to all of his rivals (and 33 lbs to the winner). He ran with the strap in the Lonsdale Handicap Hurdle at Kempton and put up an improved performance to finish second, beaten three quarters of a length, behind Big Valley while conceding 31 lbs. In his final race before Cheltenham, Persian War was second by a short head to Orient War (receiving 12 lbs) in the City Trial Hurdle at Nottingham.

Despite his string of defeats, he was rated the 5/4 favourite in the Champion Hurdle. Also in the field were old rival Major Rose; his early season conqueror Escalus; Triumph Hurdle and dual Christmas Hurdle winner Coral Diver; Imperial Cup winner Solomon; last year’s second Drumikill; and Mugatpura. Persian War’s owner-mate Bobby Moore led the field until the fifth hurdle, when Persian War took a clear lead. Approaching the final flight, only Major Rose mustered a challenge, and Persian War saw him off to win by a length and a half “in the manner of Sir Ken”. After the race, trainer Colin Davies declared the horse as “the best hurdler I’ve ever seen… so far there has been nothing to touch him”.

Persian War’s final effort that season came in the Welsh Champion hurdle thirteen days later, where he finished third to Frozen Alive and Coral Diver while giving them 16 lbs and 7 lbs respectively in weight. As he had had wind issues again during the race, Persian War had his soft palate operated on at the Newmarket Equine Research Centre in an attempt to solve the problem.

During the summer, the relationship between Henry Alper and Colin Davies soured until Alper removed all of his horses from Davies' yard and assigned Arthur Pitt from Epsom as Persian War’s new trainer.

=== 1970/1971 season ===
Persian War showed renewed form the following season, winning the Cleehill Hurdle at Ludlow by a distance from Mugatpura (who fell and was remounted) before winning Newbury’s Woolton Hill Hurdle in similar fashion from Vega Star. He then finished fourth under 12 st 7 lbs to Inishmaan in the Fighting Fifth Hurdle and a close third to Pendil and Dondieu in the Cheltenham Trial Hurdle in December.

Persian War then travelled over to Ireland to run in the Sweeps Hurdle at Fairyhouse, where he won by eight lengths from Lockyersleigh and Inishmaan. He next finished third to old rival Major Rose in the Oteley Hurdle at Sandown, before a fifth under 12 st 7 lbs to Cala Mesquida in the Schweppes Gold Trophy.

Persian War then took on the outstanding young hurdler Bula, who had won the previous season's Gloucestershire Hurdle by six lengths. He finished fourth, ten lengths behind Bula, who confirmed himself as most likely candidate for the Champion Hurdle crown.

In that race, Bula proved dominant in defeating Persian War by four lengths. Although well beaten, Persian War won his own private battle with Major Rose, defeating that rival by a length into third. The win showed Bula to be “an exceptional champion”, who confirmed this view by inflicting another, though narrow, defeat on Persian War in the Welsh Champion Hurdle. Persian War ran one final race that season, finishing fifth to Dondieu in the Scottish Champion Hurdle just four days after his Chepstow race.

=== 1971/1972 season ===
During the summer of 1971, Persian War once again switched trainers to Dennis Rayson’s Exning yard. The change did little to revive his fortunes, and he went through the next season almost winless, with bad defeats behind Bula in the Skeaping Trophy Hurdle, behind Churchwood in the Benson & Hedges Hurdle, and in the Cheltenham Trial Hurdle when fifth to Canasta Lad. He ran better when second to Coral Diver in the Scottish Champion Hurdle and third to Mago in the Badmore Handicap Hurdle at Nottingham, before registering his final win in the Latecomers Hurdle over two miles six furlongs at Stratford. The one length win over Moison was considered to be inferior to his previous prestigious wins.

=== 1972/1973 season ===
Despite his deteriorating form, Persian War returned to racing the following season, finishing eleventh to Big Valley in the Newent Handicap Hurdle at Cheltenham, then fifth in the Broadway Hurdle at the same track in January.

Alper proposed that the horse be tried over fences, which led to a falling out with Dennis Rayson, and Jack Gibson being appointed as Persian War’s sixth and final trainer. An injured leg ruled him out for the season before he could run in a chase.

=== Retirement ===
In 1974, Persian War was being trained to run in the County Hurdle, when a bruised leg spelled his retirement at age eleven. From fifty-one races over hurdles, he won eighteen races and was second and third nine times each. He retired to Genesis Green Stud, where he lived until his death in 1984 aged 21. His heart is buried beneath a headstone raised by Henry Alper who also co-authored a book on Persian War.

The Grade 2 Persian War Novices’ Hurdle is run in his honour at Chepstow and features Monsignor, Reve De Sivola, and Silviniaco Conti on its roll of honour.

== Assessment ==
In their book A Century of Champions, John Randall and Tony Morris described Persian War as "the greatest hurdler ever seen up until that time", and rated him 180, just 2 lbs behind their highest rated hurdler Night Nurse.

== Pedigree ==
Pedigree of Persian War (GB), bay gelding, 1963
Sire Persian Gulf (GB) 1940	Bahram (GB); 1932	Blandford*	Swynford*
Sire Persian Gulf (GB) 1940	Bahram (GB); 1932	Blandford*	Blanche*
Sire Persian Gulf (GB) 1940	Bahram (GB); 1932	Friar’s Daughter	Friar Marcus
Sire Persian Gulf (GB) 1940	Bahram (GB); 1932	Friar’s Daughter	Garron Lass
Sire Persian Gulf (GB) 1940	Double Life (IRE); 1926	Bachelors Double	Tredennis
Sire Persian Gulf (GB) 1940	Double Life (IRE); 1926	Bachelors Double	Lady Bawn
Sire Persian Gulf (GB) 1940	Double Life (IRE); 1926	Saint Joan	Willbrook
Sire Persian Gulf (GB) 1940	Double Life (IRE); 1926	Saint Joan	Flo Desmond
Dam Warning (GB) 1950	Chanteur (FR); 1942	Chateau Bouscaut	Kircubbin
Dam Warning (GB) 1950	Chanteur (FR); 1942	Chateau Bouscaut	Ramondie
Dam Warning (GB) 1950	Chanteur (FR); 1942	La Diva	Blue Skies*
Dam Warning (GB) 1950	Chanteur (FR); 1942	La Diva	La Traviata
Dam Warning (GB) 1950	Vertencia (FR); 1945	Deiri	Aethelstan
Dam Warning (GB) 1950	Vertencia (FR); 1945	Deiri	Desra
Dam Warning (GB) 1950	Vertencia (FR); 1945	Advertencia	Ksar
Dam Warning (GB) 1950	Vertencia (FR); 1945	Advertencia	Ad Gloriam (Family: 16)

* Persian War is inbred 3S x 5D to the stallion Blandford, meaning that he appears third generation on the sire side of his pedigree, and fifth generation (via Blue Skies) on the dam side of his pedigree.
