= Liffey Handicap Hurdle =

Hurdle horse race in Ireland

Liffey Handicap Hurdle
2026
Bowensonfire	I Started A Joke	Kimi De Mai

Previous years
2025
Mclaurey	Storm Heart	Irish Panther
2024
Lord Erskine	Magical Zoe	Zenta
2023
Gaelic Warrior	Nibiru	Ballyadam
2022
Call Me Lyreen	Magic Tricks	Autumn Evening
2021
Drop The Anchor	Champagne Gold	Saint D'Oroux

2020-2011
2020
Thosedaysaregone	Golden Jewel	You Raised Me Up
2019
Off You Go	Jezki	Ivanovich Gorbatov
2018
Off You Go	Deal D'estruval	Grand Partner
2017
Ice Cold Soul	Tudor City	Golden Spear
2016
Henry Higgins	Kalkir	Desoto County
2015
Katie T	Modem	Ted Veale
2014
Gilgamboa	Flaxen Flare	Quick Jack
2013
Abbey Lane	Rocky Wednesday	Ted Veale
2012
Citizenship	Leah Claire	Staying Article
2011
Final Approach	Call The Police	Mutadarek

2010-2001
2010
Puyol	Tawaagg	C'est Ca
2009
Penny's Bill	Psycho	Carthalawn
2008
Barker	Brave Right	Silver Jaro
2007
Spring The Que	Mister Hight	New Field
2006
Studmaster	No Where To Hyde	Pom Flyer
2005
Essex	Mansony	Al Eile
2004
Dromlease Express	Macs Joy	Georges Girl
2003
Xenophon	Colourful Life	Camden Tanner
2002
Adamant Approach	Native Scout	Janidou
2001
Grinkov	Ricardo	Rooster Booster

2000-1991
2000
Mantles Prince	Geos	She's Our Mare
1999
Archive Footage	Daraheen Chief	Its Time For A Win
1998
Graphic Equaliser	Notcomplainingbut	Lady Daisy
1997
Master Tribe	Black Queen	Penny A Day
1996
Dance Beat	Family Way	Derrymoyle
1995
Anusha	Derrymoyle	Cockney Lad
1994
Atone	Arctic Weather	Judicial Field
1993
Glencloud	Kilcash	Atone
1992
How's The Boss	Cock Cockburn	Larnaca
1991
The Illiad	Bawnmore Lad	Riverhead

1990-1988
1990
Redundant Pal	Dis Train	Fragrant Dawn
1989
Redundant Pal	Atteses	Kingsmill
1988
Roark	Shannon Spray	The Illiad

The Liffey Handicap Hurdle is a National Hunt hurdle race in Ireland which is open to horses aged four years or older. It is run at Leopardstown over a distance of about 2 miles (3,219 metres), and during its running there are eight hurdles to be jumped. It is a handicap race, and it is scheduled to take place each year in late January or early February .

The present race has evolved from the Irish Sweeps Hurdle, an event which was first run in 1969. This was one of several races which contributed to the Irish Hospitals' Sweepstake, a scheme to help fund investment in Ireland's health service. Thousands of tickets were sold to the public, and each was allocated with the name of a horse due to run in a particular race. The tickets corresponding to the winning horse could yield a substantial dividend. The Irish Sweeps Hurdle initially took place at Fairyhouse, and it was then transferred to Leopardstown in 1971. In its early years the race took place in December, and prior to becoming a handicap it served as a major trial for the Champion Hurdle when it was won by champions such as Persian War, Comedy of Errors and Night Nurse, as well as the future Cheltenham Gold Cup winner, Captain Christy.

A second phase of the race's history began in 1987, when it became known as the Ladbroke Hurdle. This event was run at Leopardstown each year in January until 2000, but it was then switched to a different venue, Ascot in Great Britain. Since 2001 this has been the usual venue of the race, now named the Ascot Rotary Club Festive Handicap Hurdle, and the race is now scheduled to be run in December.

The Pierse Hurdle, named after its sponsor Pierse Contracting Ltd, was introduced at Leopardstown in January 2001. It had an identical format to that of the "Ladbroke", and it was in effect a continuation of the same event. The race was sponsored by MCR Group in 2010 and 2011, and Boylesports bookmakers took over the sponsorship from 2012. From 2016 to 2021 the race was sponsored by Ladbrokes Coral bookmakers - the race carried Coral's name from 2016 to 2018, and became the Ladbrokes Hurdle in 2019. It has been run under the present title since 2022.

== Records ==
Most successful horse since 1969 (2 wins):

- Comedy of Errors – 1973, 1974
- Fredcoteri - 1983, 1984
- Redundant Pal- 1986, 1990
- Off You Go - 2018, 2019

Leading jockey since 1969 (4 wins):

- Tom Taaffe – Fredcoteri (1983, 1984), Bonalma (1986), Roark (1988)

Leading trainer since 1969 (6 wins):

- Arthur Moore - Irian (1979), Fredcoteri (1983, 1984), Bonalma (1986), Roark (1988), Graphic Equaliser (1998)

== Winners ==
- Weights given in stones and pounds.

Year	Winner	Age	Weight	Jockey	Trainer
1969	Normandy	4		Terry Biddlecombe	Fred Rimell
1970	Persian War	7		Jimmy Uttley	Arthur Pitt
1971	Kelanne	7	11-06	Bill Smith	Bill Marshall
1972	Captain Christy	5	11-06	Bobby Beasley	Pat Taaffe
1973	Comedy of Errors	6	12-00	Bill Smith	Fred Rimell
1974	Comedy of Errors	7	12-00	Ken White	Fred Rimell
1975	Night Nurse	4	11-05	Paddy Broderick	Peter Easterby
1976	Master Monday	6	10-02	John Harty	L. Quirke
1977	Decent Fellow	4	11-04	Richard Linley	Toby Balding
1978	Chinrullah	6	10-06	Gerry Newman	Mick O'Toole
1979	Irian	5	10-00	Ann Ferris (Note: amateur jockey)	Arthur Moore
1980	Carrig Willy	5	10-00	T. A. Quinn	Mick O'Toole
	no race 1981
1982	For Auction	6	10-10	Colin Magnier	Michael Cunningham
1983	Fredcoteri	7	10-00	Tom Taaffe	Arthur Moore
1984	Fredcoteri	8	10-04	Tom Taaffe	Arthur Moore
1985	Hansel Rag	5	10-00	Anthony Powell	A. Redmond
1986	Bonalma	6	10-13	Tom Taaffe	Arthur Moore
1987	Barnbrook Again	6	11-08	Colin Brown	David Elsworth
1988	Roark	6	11-01	Tom Taaffe	Arthur Moore
1989	Redundant Pal	6	10-00	P. Kavanagh	Paddy Mullins
1990	Redundant Pal	7	11-05	Conor O'Dwyer	Paddy Mullins
1991	The Illiad	10	10-13	Pat McWilliams	Andy Geraghty
1992	How's the Boss	6	10-02	Jason Titley	John Brassil
1993	Glencloud	5	10-13	Gerry O'Neill	Noel Meade
1994	Atone	7	10-08	Kevin O'Brien	Bunny Cox
1995	Anusha	5	10-02	Shane Broderick	Michael Hourigan
1996	Dance Beat	5	09-12	Anthony Powell	Jessica Harrington
1997	Master Tribe	7	10-04	Norman Williamson	Jenny Pitman
1998	Graphic Equaliser	6	10-00	Conor O'Dwyer	Arthur Moore
1999	Archive Footage	7	11-08	David T. Evans	Dermot Weld
2000	Mantles Prince	6	09-12	Fran Berry	Pat Hughes
2001	Grinkov	6	10-07	Charlie Swan	Pat Hughes
2002	Adamant Approach	8	11-01	Ruby Walsh	Willie Mullins
2003	Xenophon	7	10-11	Mick Fitzgerald	Tony Martin
2004	Dromlease Express	6	10-04	John Allen	Charles Byrnes
2005	Essex	5	10-08	Barry Geraghty	Michael O'Brien
2006	Studmaster	6	10-03	Tommy Treacy	Jessica Harrington
2007	Spring the Que	8	10-03	Philip Enright	Robert Tyner
2008	Barker	7	10-06	Timmy Murphy	James Barrett
2009	Penny's Bill	7	09-09	Sean Flanagan	Elizabeth Doyle
2010	Puyol	8	10-10	John Cullen	John Mulhern
2011	Final Approach	5	10-09	Paul Townend	Willie Mullins
2012	Citizenship	6	10-03	Robbie Power	Jessica Harrington
2013	Abbey Lane	8	10-08	Emmet Mullins	Willie Mullins
2014	Gilgamboa	6	10-09	Mark Walsh	Enda Bolger
2015	Katie T	6	10-09	Brian Hughes	Kevin Prendergast
2016	Henry Higgins	6	10-10	Robbie Power	Charles O'Brien
2017	Ice Cold Soul	7	10-02	Sean Flanagan	Noel Meade
2018	Off You Go	5	09-10	Mark Enright	Charles Byrnes
2019	Off You Go	6	11-05	Mark Walsh	Charles Byrnes
2020	Thosedaysaregone	7	09-12	Kevin Brouder	Charles Byrnes
2021	Drop The Anchor	7	10-05	Simon Torrens	Pat Fahy
2022	Call Me Lyreen	6	11-04	Davy Russell	Gordon Elliott
2023	Gaelic Warrior	5	11-12	Paul Townend	Willie Mullins
2024	Lord Erskine	11	10-01	Darragh O'Keefe	Harry Rogers
2025	McLaurey	6	10-02	Mark Walsh	Emmet Mullins
2026	Bowensonfire	6	11-04	Jack Kennedy	Gordon Elliott

Note: Some sources may not regard the current race (2001–present) as a continuation of the Ladbroke Hurdle (1987–2000).

== See also ==
- Horse racing in Ireland
- List of Irish National Hunt races
