= International Hurdle =

Hurdle horse race in Britain

- Class: Grade 2
- Location: Cheltenham Racecourse; Cheltenham, England
- Inaugurated: 1963
- Race type: Hurdle race
- Sponsor: Unibet
- Website: Cheltenham

Race information
- Distance: 2m 179y (3,382 metres)
- Surface: Turf
- Track: Left-handed
- Qualification: Four-years-old and up
- Weight: 11 st 0 lb
- Purse: £112,000 (2020); 1st: £63,784

International Hurdle
2026
The New Lion	Nemean Lion	Brentford Hope

Previous years
2025
Constitution Hill	Brentford Hope	Spirits Bay
2024
Lossiemouth	Love Envoi	First Street
2021
Guard Your Dreams	Song For Someone	Hunters Call

2020-2011
2020
Song For Someone	Silver Streak	Ballyandy
2019
Call Me Lord	Ballyandy	Ch'tibello
2018
Brain Power	Silver Streak	Western Ryder
2017
My Tent Or Yours	The New One	Melon
2016
The New One	My Tent Or Yours	Old Guard
2015
Old Guard	Sempre Medici	Hargam
2014
The New One	Vaniteux	Olofi
2013
The New One	Zarkandar	Jumps Road
2012
Zarkandar	Grandouet	Rock on Ruby
2011
Grandouet	Overturn	Brampour

2010-2001
2010
Menorah	Cue Card	Silviniaco Conti
2009
Khyber Kim	Celestial Halo	Medermit
2008
Binocular	Celestial Halo	Chomba Womba
2007
Osana	Katchit	Penzance
2006
Detroit City	Hardy Eustace	Crow Wood
2005
Harchibald	Intersky Falcon	Faasel
2004
Back in Front	Inglis Drever	Westender
2003
Rigmarole	Davenport Milenium	Hasty Prince
2002
Rooster Booster	Landing Light	Geos

2000-1991
2000
Geos	Barton	Mr Percy
1999
Relkeel	Far Cry	Shooting Light
1998
Relkeel	Grey Shot	Midnight Legend
1997
Relkeel	Pridwell	Collier Bay
1996
Large Action	Bimsey	Theatreworld
1994
Large Action	Flakey Dove	Absalom's Lady
1993
Staunch Friend	Halkopous	Muse
1992
Halkopous	Granville Again	Morley Street
1991
Royal Derbi	Nomadic Way	Ruling

1990-1987
1989
Cruising Altitude	Nomadic Way	Beech Road
1988
Condor Pan	Floyd	Sprowston Boy
1987
Pat's Jester	Aldino	Tom Sharp

The International Hurdle is a Grade 2 National Hunt hurdle race in Great Britain which is open to horses aged four years or older. It is run on the New Course at Cheltenham over a distance of about 2 miles and 1 furlong (2 miles and 179 yards, or 3,382 metres), and during its running there are eight hurdles to be jumped. The race is scheduled to take place each year in January.

== History ==
The event was established in 1963, and it was originally called the Cheltenham Trial Hurdle. The inaugural running was won by Scottish Memories, and in the following two years it was won by the Champion Hurdle winners Magic Court and Salmon Spray. Its title was changed to the Bula Hurdle in 1977, in honour of Bula, a dual-winner of the Champion Hurdle who was successful in this contest in 1972.

The first triple-winner of the Bula Hurdle was Bird's Nest, whose third victory came in 1980. This feat was matched in the late 1990s by Relkeel, a horse subsequently honoured by the naming of different race on the same card, the Relkeel Hurdle.

The online sportsbook StanJames.com sponsored the event for the first time in 2010. The International Hurdle is the second leg in the Road to Cheltenham, a Stan James sponsored series of top-class hurdles races culminating in the 2011 Champion Hurdle at the Cheltenham Festival. The other two races are the Fighting Fifth Hurdle and the Champion Hurdle Trial. The race is now sponsored by Stan James's parent company, Unibet.

The last horse to win both the International Hurdle and the Champion Hurdle in the same season was Rooster Booster in 2002–03.

Until 2022 the race was run at Cheltenham's International meeting in December. In April 2023 the British Horseracing Authority announced that the race would be run in future at the Festival Trials meeting in January.

== Records ==
Most successful horse (3 wins):

- Birds Nest – 1977, 1978, 1980
- Relkeel – 1997, 1998, 1999
- The New One – 2013, 2014, 2016

Leading jockey (6 wins):

- Richard Johnson – Relkeel (1997, 1999), Rooster Booster (2002), Detroit City (2006), Menorah (2010), The New One (2016)

Leading trainer (7 wins):

- Nicky Henderson – Geos (2000), Binocular (2008), Grandouet (2011), My Tent Or Yours (2017), Brain Power (2018), Call Me Lord (2019), Constitution Hill (2025)

== Winners ==
Year	Winner	Age	Jockey	Trainer
1963	Scottish Memories	9	Cathal Finnegan	Arthur Thomas
1964	Magic Court	6	Pat McCarron	Tommy Robson
1965	Salmon Spray	7	Johnny Haine	Bob Turnell
1966	Sempervivum	8	Willie Robinson	Fulke Walwyn
1967	Abandoned due to foot and mouth outbreak
1968	Solway Sands	4	Brian Fletcher	John McMurchie
1969	Celtic Gold	7	Stan Murphy	Arthur Stephenson
1970	Pendil (Note: Dondieu finished first in 1970, but was relegated to second place after a stewards' inquiry)	5	Paul Kelleway	Fred Winter
1971	Canasta Lad	5	Jeff King	Peter Bailey
1972	Bula	7	Paul Kelleway	Fred Winter
1973	Comedy of Errors	6	Bill Smith	Fred Rimell
1974	Comedy of Errors	7	Ken White	Fred Rimell
1975	Sea Pigeon	5	Jonjo O'Neill	Gordon W. Richards
1976	Abandoned due to frost
1977	Birds Nest	7	Andrew Turnell	Bob Turnell
1978	Birds Nest	8	Andrew Turnell	Bob Turnell
1979	Celtic Ryde	4	Martin O'Halloran	Peter Cundell
1980	Birds Nest	10	Andrew Turnell	Bob Turnell
1981	Abandoned due to snow
1982	Ekbalco	6	Jonjo O'Neill	Roger Fisher
1983	Amarach	5	Jimmy Duggan	Roger Fisher
1984	Browne's Gazette	6	Ronnie Beggan (Note: amateur jockey)	Monica Dickinson
1985	Corporal Clinger	6	Paul Leach	Martin Pipe
1986	Floyd	6	Colin Brown	David Elsworth
1987	Pat's Jester	4	Peter Niven	Dick Allan
1988	Condor Pan	5	Charlie Swan	Jim Bolger
1989	Cruising Altitude	6	Jamie Osborne	Oliver Sherwood
1990	Abandoned due to snow
1991	Royal Derbi	6	Declan Murphy	Neville Callaghan
1992	Halkopous	6	Adrian Maguire	Mark Tompkins
1993	Staunch Friend	5	Declan Murphy	Mark Tompkins
1994	Large Action	6	Jamie Osborne	Oliver Sherwood
1995	Abandoned due to frost
1996	Large Action	8	Jamie Osborne	Oliver Sherwood
1997	Relkeel	8	Richard Johnson	David Nicholson
1998	Relkeel	9	Adrian Maguire	David Nicholson
1999	Relkeel	10	Richard Johnson	Alan King
2000	Geos	5	Mick Fitzgerald	Nicky Henderson
2001 (Note: The 2001 running took place at Newbury)	Valiramix	5	Tony McCoy	Martin Pipe
2002	Rooster Booster	8	Richard Johnson	Philip Hobbs
2003	Rigmarole	5	Robert Thornton	Paul Nicholls
2004	Back in Front	7	Davy Russell	Edward O'Grady
2005	Harchibald	6	Paul Carberry	Noel Meade
2006	Detroit City	4	Richard Johnson	Philip Hobbs
2007	Osana	5	Paddy Brennan	David Pipe
2008 (Note: The 2008 edition was held at Ascot)	Binocular	4	Tony McCoy	Nicky Henderson
2009	Khyber Kim	7	Paddy Brennan	Nigel Twiston-Davies
2010	Menorah	5	Richard Johnson	Philip Hobbs
2011	Grandouet	4	Barry Geraghty	Nicky Henderson
2012	Zarkandar	5	Ruby Walsh	Paul Nicholls
2013	The New One	5	Sam Twiston-Davies	Nigel Twiston-Davies
2014	The New One	6	Sam Twiston-Davies	Nigel Twiston-Davies
2015	Old Guard	4	Sam Twiston-Davies	Paul Nicholls
2016	The New One	8	Richard Johnson	Nigel Twiston-Davies
2017	My Tent Or Yours	10	Barry Geraghty	Nicky Henderson
2018	Brain Power	7	Nico de Boinville	Nicky Henderson
2019	Call Me Lord	6	James Bowen	Nicky Henderson
2020	Song For Someone	5	Aidan Coleman	Tom Symonds
2021	Guard Your Dreams	5	Sam Twiston-Davies	Nigel Twiston-Davies
2022	Abandoned due to frost
2024	Lossiemouth	5	Paul Townend	Willie Mullins
2025	Constitution Hill	8	Nico de Boinville	Nicky Henderson
2026	The New Lion	7	Harry Skelton	Dan Skelton

== See also ==
- Horse racing in Great Britain
- List of British National Hunt races
