= Timeform =

Sports data and content provider in England

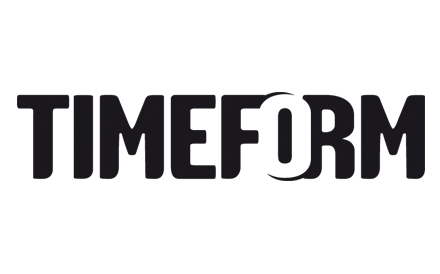
- Type: Subsidiary
- Industry: Sports data and content provider
- Founded: 1948
- Headquarters: Halifax, West Yorkshire
- Owner: Flutter Entertainment
- Website: Timeform

Timeform is a sports data and content provider located in Halifax, West Yorkshire, England. Founded in 1948, it provides systematic information on form to punters and others involved in the horse racing industry. The company was purchased by the sports betting exchange Betfair in December 2006. Since 2 February 2016, it has been owned by Flutter Entertainment.

== History ==
Portway Press Ltd was formed in 1948 by Phil Bull, who wanted to establish a mathematical link to a horse's performance, based on the time the horse recorded. At a time when such data was virtually unheard of, Bull started publishing a racing annual, which evolved into the "Racehorses Of.." series. The company was purchased for a reputed £15 million by the sports betting exchange Betfair in December 2006.

== Data system ==
According to Timeform, one of its ratings represents "the merit of the horse expressed in pounds and is arrived at by careful examination of its running against other horses using a scale of weight for distance beaten which ranges from around 3 lb a length at five furlongs and 2 lb a length at a mile and a quarter to 1 lb a length at two miles".

Timeform ratings for three-year-olds and up on the Flat:

- 140+: an all-time great horse
- 135–139: an outstanding horse
- 130–134: A "top-class racehorse")
- 125–129: A "high-class performer"
- 116–124: average Group 2 winner
- 110–115: average Group 3 winner
- 100–105: average Listed Race winner

Timeform states that the very poorest horses may be rated as low as 30, with the very best horses rated 130 and above. Two-year-old ratings are slightly lower than those for older horses. It also notes that only a very select number of horses have achieved a rating of 175 and above for hurdling (16) or 182 and above for chasing (20).

== Flat vs hurdle vs steeplechase ==
Timeform maintains different scales for horses racing on the flat, over hurdles and over fences. The scores cannot be compared for the obvious differences between the race types. For instance, Arkle at 212, Flyingbolt at 210, Sprinter Sacre at 192 are then followed by Mill House and Kauto Star, both at 191, are the highest rated steeplechasers. The highest rated horses over hurdles are Night Nurse at 182, Istabraq and Monksfield, both at 180, and Persian War at 179. The table below lists scores for flat horses only starting with the highest, rated at 147 which is the British horse Frankel.

== Publications ==
Annually in March, the company puts out its book Racehorses of ...., which currently contains more than 1,200 pages and provides information and ratings on the top flat horses in Australasia, Dubai, France, Germany, Hong Kong, Italy, Japan, North America and Scandinavia. Also, annually in October the company publishes Chasers and Hurdlers, a thorough review of every horse that ran under National Hunt rules in Britain, as well as the best National Hunt horses to have run in Ireland and France.

Timeform publishes a number of other books. Its Horses to Follow: Flat Season is composed of short essays on fifty horses deemed worthy of following in the upcoming year's classics. The horses are selected by Timeform's own team of experts along with five leading broadcasters. The book also provides a guide to the most significant two-year-old performances from the previous year.

Timeform also compiles a system based on speed and class which appears in the Daily Racing Form for all horse racing events run in the United Kingdom, Ireland, France and the United Arab Emirates.

== Top-rated Thoroughbreds on flat courses ==
The figures below are the official all-time highest rankings for horses who raced in Australia, Dubai, Europe, Hong Kong, Japan and Scandinavia, as supplied by Neil O'Connor of Timeform. Until very recently (approximately 2000), horses who raced exclusively in America were never given Timeform ratings, so they can not be compared directly to their European counterparts.

Horse	Born	Rating
Frankel	2008	147
Sea Bird	1962	145
Brigadier Gerard	1968	144
Tudor Minstrel	1944	144
Flightline	2018	143
Abernant	1946	142
Ribot	1952	142
Windy City	1949	142
Mill Reef	1968	141
Dancing Brave	1983	140
Dubai Millennium	1996	140
Harbinger	2006	140
Sea The Stars	2006	140
Shergar	1978	140
Vaguely Noble	1965	140
Arrogate	2013	139
Generous	1988	139
Pappa Fourway	1952	139
Reference Point	1984	139
Alleged	1974	138
Alycidon	1945	138
American Pharoah	2012	138
California Chrome	2011	138
Celtic Swing	1992	138
Cigar	1990	138
Daylami	1994	138
Exbury	1959	138
Nijinsky	1967	138
Star of India	1953	138
Tulloch	1954	138
Apalachee	1971	137
Baaeed	2018	137
Dayjur	1987	137
Easy Goer	1986	137
Ghostzapper	2000	137
Grundy	1972	137
Ka Ying Rising	2020	137
Kingston Town	1976	137
Mark of Esteem	1993	137
Molvedo	1958	137
Montjeu	1996	137
Moorestyle	1977	137
Never Say Die	1951	137
Peintre Celebre	1994	137
Pinza	1950	137
Princely Gift	1951	137
Ragusa	1960	137
Reliance	1962	137
Rheingold	1969	137
Right Boy	1954	137
Sunday Silence	1986	137
Troy	1976	137
Zilzal	1986	137
Alcide	1955	136
Allez France	1970	136
Ballymoss	1954	136
Battaash	2014	136
Bering	1983	136
Black Caviar	2006	136
Black Tarquin	1945	136
Bustino	1971	136
Cracksman	2014	136
Crepello	1954	136
El Condor Pasa	1995	136
El Gran Senor	1981	136
Equinox	2019	136
Floribunda	1958	136
Gentlemen	1992	136
Habibti	1980	136
Hafiz	1952	136
Hawk Wing	1999	136
Helissio	1993	136
Herbager	1956	136
Manikato	1975	136
My Babu	1945	136
Northjet	1977	136
Old Vic	1986	136
Relko	1960	136
Sakhee	1997	136
Slip Anchor	1982	136
Suave Dancer	1988	136
Tantieme	1947	136
Texana	1957	136
Thatch	1970	136
Warning	1985	136
All Along	1979	135
Arazi	1989	135
Arbar	1944	135
Arctic Prince	1948	135
Chanteur	1942	135
Charlottesville	1957	135
Cirrus des Aigles	2006	135
Coronation	1946	135
Dahlia	1970	135
Intikhab	1994	135
Known Fact	1977	135
Kris	1976	135
Lady Aurelia	2014	135
La Tendresse	1959	135
Le Moss	1975	135
Match II	1958	135
Nashwan	1986	135
Never So Bold	1980	135
Pebbles	1981	135
Petingo	1965	135
Petoski	1982	135
Right Royal	1958	135
Royal Anthem	1995	135
Sagace	1980	135
Sassafras	1967	135
Shadeed	1982	135
Shahrastani	1983	135
Shareef Dancer	1980	135
Sicambre	1948	135
Sir Ivor	1965	135
Souverain	1943	135
St Jovite	1989	135
Supreme Court	1948	135
Teenoso	1980	135
Tenerani	1944	135
The Bug	1943	135
The Minstrel	1974	135
Trempolino	1984	135
Youth	1973	135

== Top-rated horses on chase courses ==
The figures below are official all-time high weights for horses racing under National Hunt rules on chase courses.

Horse	Born	Rating
Arkle	1957	212
Flyingbolt	1959	210
Sprinter Sacre	2006	192p
Kauto Star	2000	191
Mill House	1957	191
Desert Orchid	1979	187
Dunkirk	1957	186
Burrough Hill Lad	1976	184
Long Run	2005	184
Moscow Flyer	1994	184
Don Cossack	2007	183
Master Oats	1986	183
Azertyuiop	1997	182
Best Mate	1995	182
Captain Christy	1967	182
Carvill's Hill	1982	182
Douvan	2010	182
Kicking King	1998	182
See More Business	1990	182
Well Chief	1999	182

== Top-rated Thoroughbreds on hurdle courses ==
The figures below are all-time ratings accorded by Timeform for race horses that competed under National Hunt rules on hurdle courses.

Horse	Born	Rating
Night Nurse	1971	182
Istabraq	1992	180
Monksfield	1972	180
Persian War	1963	179
Comedy of Errors	1967	178
Le Sauvignon	1994	178
Constitution Hill	2017	177p
Lanzarote	1968	177
Limestone Lad	1992	177
Big Buck's	2003	176
Birds Nest	1970	176
Bula	1965	176
Faugheen	2008	176
Golden Cygnet	1972	176
Baracouda	1995	175
Gaye Brief	1977	175
Salmon Spray	1958	175
Sea Pigeon	1970	175
