= Scottish Champion Hurdle =

Hurdle horse race in Britain

- Class: Grade 2
- Location: Ayr Racecourse; Ayr, Scotland
- Inaugurated: 1966
- Race type: Hurdle race
- Sponsor: Coral
- Website: Ayr

Race information
- Distance: 2 miles (3,219 metres)
- Surface: Turf
- Track: Left-handed
- Qualification: Four-years-old and up
- Weight: Limited Handicap
- Purse: £40,000 (2021); 1st: £22,780

Scottish Champion Hurdle
2026
| Dedicated Hero | Captain Hugo | Ooh Betty |

Previous years
2025
Cracking Rhapsody | Kabral Du Mathan | Ooh Betty
2024
Favour And Fortune | Bialystok | Cracking Rhapsody
2023
Rubaud | Colonel Mustard | Anna Bunina
2022
Anna Bunina | West Cork | Onemorefortheroad
2021
Milkwood | Anna Bunina | Tommy's Oscar

2020-2011
2019
Verdana Blue | Dino Velvet | Equus Amadeus
2018
Midnight Shadow | Claimantakinforgan | Chesterfield
2017
Chesterfield | Zubayr | Mohaayed
2016
Ch'tibello | Cloudy Dream | Clondaw Warrior
2015
Cheltenian | Sign of a Victory | Ifandbutwhynot
2014
Cockney Sparrow | Court Minstrel | My Tent Or Yours
2013
Court Minstrel | Sametegal | Silk Hall
2012
Raya Star | Local Hero | Clerk's Choice
2011
Sanctuaire | Bygones of Brid | Overturn

2010-2001
2010
Overturn | Gloucester | Arcalis
2009
Noble Alan | Secret Tune | Harper Valley
2008
Border Castle | Takeroc | Kalahari King
2007
Emmpat | Ouninpohja | Premier Dane
2006
Noble Request | Faasel | Phar Bleu
2005
Genghis | Royal Shakespeare | Dalaram
2004
Copeland | Benbyas | Saintsaire
2003
In Contrast | Thisthatandtother | Westender
2002
Milligan | Vol Solitaire | Dibea Times
2001
Ulundi | Bring Sweets | Copeland

2000-1990
2000
Mister Morose | Ballinclay King | Heart
1999
Fadalko | Potentate | Crazy Horse
1998
Blowing Wind | Kerawi | Large Action
1997
Shadow Leader | Zabadi | Edelweis Du Moulin
1996
Alderbrook | Escartefigue | Land Afar
1995
Home Counties | Simple Arithmetic | Batabanoo
1994
Corrouge | Atours | Court Master
1993
Staunch Friend | Native Mission | Ruling
1992
Granville Again | Jinxy Jack | Fidway
1991
Precious Boy | Reve De Valse | Jungle Knife
1990
Sayparee | Don Valentino | Aldino

The Scottish Champion Hurdle is a Grade 2 National Hunt hurdle race in Britain which is open to horses aged four years or older. It is run at Ayr, South Ayrshire, over a distance of about 2 miles (3,219 metres), and during its running there are nine hurdles to be jumped. It is a limited handicap race, and it is scheduled to take place each year in April.

The event was established in 1966, and the inaugural winner was Blue Venom. For a period it was classed at Listed level, and it was promoted to Grade 2 status in 1991. The race used to be held on the day before the Scottish Grand National, but both events have taken place on the same day since 1994. Its present sponsor, CPMS, has backed the race since 2019.

Several winners of the Scottish Champion Hurdle have also achieved victory in the Champion Hurdle at the Cheltenham Festival. The most recent was Alderbrook, the winner of the latter contest in 1995. Captain Christy won the race in 1973, the year before winning the Cheltenham Gold Cup as a novice. Another Irish-trained horse, Golden Cygnet, suffered fatal injuries when he fell in the 1978 running.

== Records ==
Most successful horse (2 wins):

- Sea Pigeon – 1977, 1978
- Birds Nest – 1979, 1981

Leading jockey (3 wins):

- Andrew Turnell – Bird's Nest (1979, 1981), Secret Ballot (1980)
- Peter Scudamore – Royal Vulcan (1983), Rushmoor (1984), Granville Again (1992)
- Richard Dunwoody – Alderbrook (1996), Blowing Wind (1998), Fadalko (1999)
- Richard Johnson – In Contrast (2003), Noble Request (2006), Cheltenian (2015)

Leading trainer (4 wins):

- Martin Pipe – Sayparee (1990), Granville Again (1992), Blowing Wind (1998), Copeland (2004)

== Winners ==
- Weights given in stones and pounds.

| Year | Winner | Age | Weight | Jockey | Trainer |
|---|---|---|---|---|---|
| 1966 | Blue Venom | 7 | 11-01 | Peter Adams (Note: amateur jockey) | Peter Adams |
| 1967 | Originator | 6 | 11-01 | E Wilson | J Barclay |
| 1968 | Al-'Alawi | 5 | 10-08 | Pat McCarron | T Robson |
| 1969 | Mugatpura | 6 | 11-03 | Tommy Jennings | Fulke Walwyn |
| 1970 | Easter Pirate | 6 | 10-00 | Stan Hayhurst | R Fairbairn |
| 1971 | Dondieu | 6 | 11-11 | Brian Fletcher | Denys Smith |
| 1972 | Coral Diver | 7 | 11-11 | Ken White | Fred Rimell |
| 1973 | Captain Christy | 6 | 12-00 | Bobby Beasley | Pat Taaffe (Ir) |
| 1974 | Santon Brig | 5 | 11-03 | Michael Dickinson | Tony Dickinson |
| 1975 | Comedy of Errors | 8 | 12-00 | Ken White | Fred Rimell |
| 1976 | Night Nurse | 5 | 12-00 | Paddy Broderick | Peter Easterby |
| 1977 | Sea Pigeon | 7 | 11-04 | Jonjo O'Neill | Peter Easterby |
| 1978 | Sea Pigeon | 8 | 12-00 | Jonjo O'Neill | Peter Easterby |
| 1979 | Bird's Nest | 9 | 11-08 | Andrew Turnell | Bob Turnell |
| 1980 | Secret Ballot | 6 | 10-07 | Andrew Turnell | Bob Turnell |
| 1981 | Bird's Nest | 11 | 11-06 | Andrew Turnell | Bob Turnell |
| 1982 | Gay George | 6 | 11-07 | Bill Smith | Fulke Walwyn |
| 1983 | Royal Vulcan | 5 | 11-13 | Peter Scudamore | Neville Callaghan |
| 1984 | Rushmoor | 6 | 10-13 | Peter Scudamore | Ray Peacock |
| 1985 | Sailor's Dance | 5 | 11-01 | Jimmy Duggan | Fred Winter |
| 1986 | River Ceiriog | 5 | 10-09 | Steve Smith Eccles | Nicky Henderson |
| 1987 | Positive | 5 | 10-08 | Paul Croucher | Kim Bailey |
| 1988 | Pat's Jester | 5 | 11-01 | Brian Storey | Dick Allan |
| 1989 | Aldino | 6 | 12-00 | Simon Sherwood | Oliver Sherwood |
| 1990 | Sayparee | 5 | 10-07 | Jonothan Lower | Martin Pipe |
| 1991 | Precious Boy | 5 | 11-02 | Lorcan Wyer | Mike O'Neill |
| 1992 | Granville Again | 6 | 11-10 | Peter Scudamore | Martin Pipe |
| 1993 | Staunch Friend | 5 | 11-10 | Adrian Maguire | Mark Tompkins |
| 1994 | Corrouge | 5 | 11-02 | David Bridgwater | Nigel Twiston-Davies |
| 1995 | Home Counties | 6 | 11-02 | James Moffatt | Dudley Moffatt |
| 1996 | Alderbrook | 7 | 11-07 | Richard Dunwoody | Kim Bailey |
| 1997 | Shadow Leader | 6 | 10-05 | Jamie Osborne | Charles Egerton |
| 1998 | Blowing Wind | 5 | 11-05 | Richard Dunwoody | Martin Pipe |
| 1999 | Fadalko | 6 | 10-04 | Richard Dunwoody | Paul Nicholls |
| 2000 | Mister Morose | 10 | 10-10 | Tony McCoy | Nigel Twiston-Davies |
| 2001 | Ulundi | 6 | 10-04 | Dean Gallagher | Paul Webber |
| 2002 | Milligan | 7 | 10-08 | Norman Williamson | Venetia Williams |
| 2003 | In Contrast | 7 | 10-13 | Richard Johnson | Philip Hobbs |
| 2004 | Copeland | 9 | 10-01 | Jamie Moore | Martin Pipe |
| 2005 | Genghis | 6 | 10-11 | Tony McCoy | Peter Bowen |
| 2006 | Noble Request | 5 | 10-09 | Richard Johnson | Philip Hobbs |
| 2007 | Emmpat | 9 | 10-07 | David Casey | Charlie Swan |
| 2008 | Border Castle | 7 | 09-13 | Nick Scholfield | Andrew Haynes |
| 2009 | Noble Alan | 6 | 10-05 | Davy Condon | Nicky Richards |
| 2010 | Overturn | 6 | 10-07 | Timmy Murphy | Donald McCain |
| 2011 | Sanctuaire | 5 | 10-08 | Ruby Walsh | Paul Nicholls |
| 2012 | Raya Star | 6 | 11-06 | Robert Thornton | Alan King |
| 2013 | Court Minstrel | 6 | 10-09 | Adam Wedge | Evan Williams |
| 2014 | Cockney Sparrow | 5 | 09-11 | Dean Pratt | John Quinn |
| 2015 | Cheltenian | 9 | 10-13 | Richard Johnson | Philip Hobbs |
| 2016 | Ch'Tibello | 5 | 11-01 | Harry Skelton | Dan Skelton |
| 2017 | Chesterfield | 7 | 10-05 | Daniel Sansom | Seamus Mullins |
| 2018 | Midnight Shadow | 5 | 10-04 | Danny Cook | Sue Smith |
| 2019 | Verdana Blue | 7 | 11-03 | Connor Brace | Nicky Henderson |
| | no race 2020 (Note: The 2020 running was cancelled because of the COVID-19 pandemic in the United Kingdom) |
| 2021 | Milkwood | 7 | 11-06 | Sam Twiston-Davies | Neil Mulholland |
| 2022 | Anna Bunina | 6 | 10-04 | Sean Bowen | John McConnell |
| 2023 | Rubaud | 5 | 10-11 | Harry Cobden | Paul Nicholls |
| 2024 | Favour And Fortune | 6 | 11-02 | Tom Cannon | Alan King |
| 2025 | Cracking Rhapsody | 6 | 11-05 | Craig Nichol | Ewan Whillans |
| 2026 | Dedicated Hero | 7 | 10-06 | Danny McMenamin | Sandy Thomson |

== See also ==
- Horse racing in Scotland
- List of British National Hunt races
