= Mark Birch (jockey) =

British jockey

Mark Birch (1949 – 19 October 2016) was a British jockey who competed in Flat racing. Birch took part in races primarily in the north of England and was a long-standing jockey for the racehorse trainer Peter Easterby. Amongst the best horses Birch rode was Sea Pigeon, who he rode to two Chester Cup victories and Protection Racket on whom he won the Ebor Handicap.
