= Welsh Champion Hurdle =

Hurdle horse race in Britain

Welsh Champion Hurdle
2024
Lump Sum	Steel Ally	Black Hawk Eagle

Previous years
2023
Nemean Lion	Anyharminasking	Fiveonefive
2022
Effernock Fizz	Milkwood	Severance
2021
Glory And Fortune	Dans Le Vent	Leoncavallo

2020-2011
2019
Monsieur Lecoq	Le Prezien	Colonel Custard
2018
Silver Streak	Le Prezien	Ozzie The Oscar
2017
The New One	Clyne	Sire De Grugy
2016
Garde La Victoire	Welsh Shadow	Curious Carlos
2015
Silsol	Kayf Moss	Foryourinformation
2014
Saphir Du Rheu	Whisper	Grand Vision
2013
Medinas	Peckhamecho	Tanerko Emery
2011
Oscar Whisky	Black Jack Blues	Tarkari

2002–1995
2002
Vol Solitaire	Copeland	Achilles Wings
2000
Mister Morose	Geos	Potentate
1999
Potentate	Tiutchev	City Hall
1998
Potentate	Cadougold	Relkeel
1997
Potentate	Daraydan	Mistinguett
1996
Absalom's Lady	Backgammon	Rubhahunish
1995
Nemuro	Pridwell	Olympian

The Welsh Champion Hurdle is a National Hunt Limited handicap hurdle race in Wales which is open to horses aged four years or older. It is run at Chepstow over a distance of about 2 miles (3,219 metres) and it is scheduled to take place each year in October.

The race was first run in 1969 at Chepstow over 2 miles and continued there until 2002, holding Listed status during the 1980s. The race was usually run on Easter Monday and prior to the 1990s was usually contested by horses that had performed well in the Champion Hurdle. However field sizes were consistently small even in its heyday.

The standard of the race declined in the 1990s, and it was run as a handicap in 1993 and from 2000 until 2002. Unfortunately this change did not result in increased fields and the race was dropped from the calendar in 2003.

In 2010 the race was revived, as a Limited Handicap, scheduled to be run at Ffos Las in February, over 2 miles. However the race was lost to the weather.

The new race did take place in 2011, being won easily by Oscar Whisky, owned by track owner, Dai Walters.

The distance was increased to a distance of 2 miles and 4 furlongs in 2013. The race was moved to a new date in mid-October in 2016 and reverted to 2 miles. In October 2025 the race returned to Chepstow as part of a new three-day Welsh Racing Festival.

== Winners ==
Year	Winner	Age	Weight	Jockey	Trainer
1969	Persian War	6	12-00	Jimmy Uttley	Colin Davies
1970	Frozen Alive	4	10–12	Stan Mellor	Harry Thomson Jones
1971	Bula	6	12-00	Paul Kelleway	Fred Winter
1972	Canasta Lad	6	11-08	Jeff King	Peter Bailey
1973	Comedy of Errors	6	12-00	Bill Smith	Fred Rimell
1974	Canasta Lad	8	11-04	Jeff King	Peter Bailey
1975	Lanzarote	7	11-04	Richard Pitman	Fred Winter
1976	Night Nurse	5	11-11	Paddy Broderick	Peter Easterby
1977	Night Nurse	6	11–12	Paddy Broderick	Peter Easterby
1978	Abandoned because course waterlogged
1979	Monksfield	7	12-00	Dessie Hughes	Des McDonogh
1980	Sea Pigeon	10	12-00	Jonjo O'Neill	Peter Easterby
1981	Pollardstown	6	11-09	Philip Blacker	Stan Mellor
1982	Ekbalco	6	11-09	Jonjo O'Neill	Roger Fisher
1983	Royal Vulcan	5	11–13	David Goulding	Neville Callaghan
1984	Ra Nova	5	11-08	Mark Perrett	Nan Kennedy
1985	Browne's Gazette	7	11–13	Dermot Browne	Monica Dickinson
1986	Abandoned because course waterlogged
1987	High Knowl	4	11-00	Jonothon Lower	Martin Pipe
1988	Past Glories	5	11-06	Patrick Farrell	Bill Elsey
1989	Celtic Shot	7	11-06	Peter Scudamore	Charlie Brooks
1990	Beech Road	8	12-01	Richard Guest	Toby Balding
1991	Wonder Man	6	11-10	Mark Pitman	Jenny Pitman
1992	Don Valentino	7	11-10	Mark Pitman	Jenny Pitman
1993	Dextra Dove	6	10-04	Simon Earle	Philip Hobbs
1994	Abandoned due to waterlogging
1995	Nemuro	7	11-06	Alan McCabe	David Elsworth
1996	Absalom's Lady	8	11-09	A Procter	David Elsworth
1997	Potentate	6	11-06	Jamie Evans	Martin Pipe
1998	Potentate	7	11-10	Jamie Evans	Martin Pipe
1999	Potentate	8	11–12	Tony McCoy	Martin Pipe
2000	Mister Morose	10	11-10	Carl Llewellyn	Nigel Twiston-Davies
2001	Abandoned due to Foot and Mouth outbreak
2002	Vol Solitaire	4	10-00	Timmy Murphy	Paul Nicholls
	2003–2009 No Race
2010	Abandoned due to Snow and Frost
2011	Oscar Whisky	6	11-07	Barry Geraghty	Nicky Henderson
2012	Abandoned due to Frost
2013	Medinas	6	10-10	Wayne Hutchinson	Alan King
2014	Saphir Du Rheu	5	11-10	Harry Derham	Paul Nicholls
2015	Silsol	6	11-10	Jack Sherwood	Paul Nicholls
	no race Feb 2016 (Note: The February 2016 race was abandoned because of waterlogging.)
2016	Garde La Victoire	7	11-10	Richard Johnson	Philip Hobbs
2017	The New One	9	11-05	Zac Baker (Note: amateur jockey)	Nigel Twiston-Davies
2018	Silver Streak	5	10-04	Adam Wedge	Evan Williams
2019	Monsieur Lecoq	5	10-05	Chester Williams	Jane Williams
2020	Sceau Royal	8	11-06	Daryl Jacob	Alan King
2021	Glory And Fortune	6	10-07	Stan Sheppard	Tom Lacey
2022	Effernock Fizz	7	10-07	Sam Ewing	Cian Michael Collins
2023	Nemean Lion	6	11-04	Richard Patrick	Kerry Lee
2024	Lump Sum	6	11-06	Dylan Johnston	Sam Thomas
2025	Celtic Dino	6	11-09	Dylan Johnston	Sam Thomas
2026	Pioneer Pete	6	10-07	Jonjo O'Neill Jr	Jonjo O'Neill

== See also ==
- Horse racing in Great Britain
- List of British National Hunt races
