= Birds Nest (horse) =

British-bred Thoroughbred racehorse

- Sire: Entanglement
- Grandsire: King of the Tudors
- Dam: Fair Sabrina
- Damsire: Mustang
- Sex: Gelding
- Foaled: 1970
- Country: United Kingdom
- Colour: Chestnut
- Breeder: G. W. Morris
- Owner: Ian Scott
- Trainer: Bob Turnell
- Record: 62: 19-14-6

Major wins
- Fighting Fifth Hurdle (1976, 1977, 1979); Christmas Hurdle (1979); Scottish Champion Hurdle (1979, 1981); Bula Hurdle (1977, 1978, 1980)

Birds Nest (1970–1994) was a British-bred thoroughbred racehorse. In a long career as a specialist hurdler he ran six times in the Champion Hurdle at Cheltenham Racecourse, finishing second to Night Nurse in 1976 and third behind Sea Pigeon and Monksfield in 1980. He won 19 hurdle races including the Fighting Fifth Hurdle and the Bula Hurdle on three occasions each. He also won the Christmas Hurdle and two runnings of the Scottish Champion Hurdle, beating some of the best hurdlers of all time. He has been described as the best hurdler never to win the Champion Hurdle. Throughout his career, he was known for being a difficult and temperamental horse, with a tendency to veer left when under pressure.

== Assessment ==
Birds Nest was rated at 176 by Timeform in the seasons 1975/6 and 1976/7. At the time of his retirement he was the joint-third highest rated hurdler in the organisation's history, after Night Nurse and Monksfield and equal with Golden Cygnet. In their book A Century of Champions, John Randall and Tony Morris ranked Birds Nest the ninth best British or Irish hurdler of the 20th century.
