= Fairlawne Chase =

The Fairlawne Chase was a National Hunt chase in England which was open to horses aged five years and older. It was run at Windsor over a distance of 3 miles (4,828 metres), and was scheduled to take place each year in February.

The race was first run in 1962 and was last run in 1997, when Windsor stopped hosting National Hunt racing. National Hunt racing returned to Windsor temporarily in 2004 when Ascot was closed for renovations, and Windsor hosted the Long Walk Hurdle.

The race was a handicap before 1968, when it became a Conditions race, until its final year, when it was again run as a handicap.

The race was named after the establishment at Shipbourne Kent of the Queen Mother's racing trainer, Peter Cazalet. The same name has now been given to a new race, the Fairlawne Handicap Chase at Cheltenham, run at the New Year meeting.

== Winners ==
Year	Winner	Age	Weight	Jockey	Trainer
1962	Hedgelands	9	11-07	Josh Gifford	C Mitchell
1963	Certain Justice	10	11-01	Terry Baldwin	Arthur Neaves
1964	Sir Daniel	8	11-04	Bill Rees	Peter Cazalet
1965	Anglo	7	11-02	Tim Norman	Fred Winter
1966	No Race
1967	Abandoned because of frost
1968	Bassnet	9	11-04	David Nicholson	A Kilpatrick
1969	The Laird	8	11-07	Jeff King	Bob Turnell
1970	Specify	8	11-04	Terry Biddlecombe	D Weeden
1971	Into View	8	12-00	Paul Kelleway	Fred Winter
1972	Cardinal Error	8	11-00	John Francome	Fred Winter
1973	Spanish Steps	10	12-00	Bob Davies	Edward Courage
1974	Game Spirit	8	11-04	Terry Biddlecombe	Fulke Walwyn
1975	Bula	10	12-01	John Francome	Fred Winter
1976	Bula	11	12-00	John Francome	Fred Winter
1977	Abandoned because of waterlogged state of course
1978	Abandoned because of frost
1979	Joint Venture	10	11-08	John Francome	Jim Old
1980	Border Incident	10	12-00	John Francome	Richard Head
1981	Abandoned because of frost
1982	Venture To Cognac	9	11-12	Mr Oliver Sherwood	Fred Winter
1983	Abandoned because of snow
1984	Everett	9	11-12	Stuart Shilston	Fulke Walwyn
1985	Abandoned because of snow and frost
1986	Abandoned because of snow and frost
1987	Western Sunset	11	11-12	Hywel Davies	Tim Forster
1988	Rhyme 'N' Reason	9	11–04	Brendan Powell Snr	David Elsworth
1989	Bartres	10	11–08	Graham Bradley	David Murray Smith
1990	Abandoned because of flooding
1991	Espy	8	11–08	Peter Scudamore	Charlie Brooks
1992	Toby Tobias	10	11–12	Mark Pitman	Jenny Pitman
1993	Zeta's Lad	10	11–04	J R Kavanagh	John Upson
1994	Black Humour	10	10–11	Graham Bradley	Charlie Brooks
1995	Zeta's Lad	12	11–01	Graham Bradley	Charlie Brooks
1996	Commercial Artist	10	11–12	Andrew Thornton	Nick Gaselee
1997	Equity Player	12	10–13	Derek Morris	Roger Curtis
