= Potentate =

Potentate may refer to:

- Imperial Potentate, the title of the head of the Shriners
- Potentate, three-time winner of the Welsh Champion Hurdle (1997–1999)
- St. Ambrose's term for a Power in Christian angelology
