= Chester Cup =

Flat horse race in Britain

- Class: Handicap
- Location: Chester Racecourse; Chester, Cheshire, England
- Inaugurated: 1824
- Race type: Flat / Thoroughbred
- Sponsor: The Tote
- Website: Chester

Race information
- Distance: 2m 2f 140y (3,749m)
- Surface: Turf
- Track: Left-handed
- Qualification: Four-years-old and up
- Weight: Handicap
- Purse: £170,080 (2025); 1st: £86,632

Chester Cup
2026
A Piece Of Heaven	Maxi King	Duraji

Previous years
2025
East India Dock	Caballo De Mar	Zoffee
2024
Zoffee	Emiyn	Zanndabad
2023
Metier	Zoffee	Call My Bluff
2022
Cleveland	Coltrane	Rajinsky
2021
Falcon Eight	The Grand Visir	Hochfeld

2020-2011
2019
Making Miracles	Who Dares Wins	Whiskey Sour
2018
Magic Circle	Fun Mac	Who Dares Wins
2017
Montaly	Yorkidding	Fun Mac
2016
No Heretic	Nakeeta	Silver Concorde
2015
Trip To Paris	Quick Jack	Zafayan
2014
Suegioo	Angel Gabrial	Communicator
2013
Address Unknown	Ingleby Spirit	Tominator
2012
Ile De Re	Overturn	Gulf of Naples
2011
Overturn	Tastahil	Mystery Star

2010-2001
2010
Mamlook	Tastahil	Halla San
2009
Daraahem	Ajaan	Halla San
2008
Bulwark	Som Tala	Tilt
2007
Greenwich Meantime	Fair Along	Enjoy The Moment
2006
Admiral	Vinando	Greenwich Meantime
2005
Anak Pekan	Swift Sailor	Contact Dancer
2004
Anak Pekan	Misternando	Big Moment
2003
Hugs Dancer	Big Moment	Knavesmire Omen
2002
Fantasy Hill	Rainbow High	High And Mighty
2001
Rainbow High	High And Mighty	Prairie Falcon

2000-1991
2000
Bangalore	Ansar	Fantasy Hill
1999
Rainbow High	Generosity	Invermark
1998
Silence In Court	Turnpole	Leonato
1997
Top Cees	Etterby Park	Thaljanah
1996
Merit	Daraydan	Corradini
1995
Top Cees	Harlestone Brook	The Flying Phantom
1994
Doyce	Moidart	Welshman
1993
Rodeo Star	Jack Button	Welshman
1992
Welshman	Bardolph	Line Drummer
1991
Star Player	Nomadic Way	Taroudant

1990-1988
1990
Travelling Light	Rambo Castle	Andorra
1989
Grey Salute	Travel Mystery	Ala Hounak
1988
Old Hubert	Tom Sharp	Trust The Irish

The Chester Cup is a flat handicap horse race in Great Britain open to horses aged four years or older. It is run over a distance of 2 miles, 2 furlongs and 140 yards (3,749 metres) at Chester in May.

== History ==
The event was established in 1824, and it was originally called the Tradesmen's Cup. It was initially a limited handicap with a minimum weight of 8 st 2 lb.

For a period the race was known as the Tradesmen's Plate. During this time it was open to horses aged three or older.

The race was renamed the Chester Trades' Cup in 1874. From this point it was often referred to as the Chester Cup, and that became its usual title in 1884.

The Chester Cup was formerly contested over 2 miles, 2 furlongs and 77 yards. It was abandoned in 1969, and extended by 20 yards in 1970.

The distance of the race was changed to 2 miles, 2 furlongs and 117 yards in 1992. It was increased to its present length in 1994.

== Records ==
Most successful horse (2 wins):

- Leamington – 1857, 1859
- Dalby – 1865, 1866
- Pageant – 1877, 1878
- Dare Devil – 1892, 1893
- Chivalrous – 1922, 1923
- Sea Pigeon – 1977, 1978
- Top Cees – 1995, 1997
- Rainbow High – 1999, 2001
- Anak Pekan – 2004, 2005

Leading jockey (4 wins):

- Sam Darling – Independence (1831), Colwick (1832), Pickpocket (1833), Cardinal Puff (1839)
- Lester Piggott – Sandiacre (1958), Aegean Blue (1966), Major Rose (1968), John Cherry (1976)

Leading trainer (4 wins):

- Barry Hills – Arapahos (1980), Rainbow High (1999, 2001), Daraahem (2009)

== Winners since 1890 ==
- Weights given in stones and pounds.

Year	Winner	Age	Weight	Jockey	Trainer	SP	Time
1890	Tyrant	5	7-00	Seth Chandley	W Walters	5/2 F	4:07.40
1891	Vasistas	5	8-03	George Barrett	John Porter	9/4 F	4:07.00
1892	Dare Devil	4	7-05	Thomas Mullen	William I'Anson jr	11/2	4:08.60
1893	Dare Devil	5	8-01	Jim Fagan	William I'Anson jr	9/2
1894	Quaesitum	4	8-00	Tommy Loates	F Cole	5/2 F
1895	Kilsallaghan	5	7-09	Fred Finlay	James Jewitt	20/1	4:05.20
1896	The Rush	4	8-05	Otto Madden	J Waugh	8/1	4:08.60
1897	Count Schomberg	5	8-10	Samuel Loates	William Leader	2/1 JF	4:07.00
1898	Up Guards	4	6-13	Seth Chandley	A Sydney	33/1	4:06.40
1899	Uncle Mac	5	7-07	Fred Finlay	Fred Lynham	100/8	4:10.40
1900	Roughside	7	7-05	Tod Sloan	Sandever	7/1	4:12.00
1901	David Garrick	4	8-10	Lester Reiff	George Blackwell	10/1	4:06.20
1902	Carabine	4	7-05	Monty Aylin	J Hornsby	7/1	4:03.60
1903	Vendale	4	6-06	Charlie Trigg	William Duke	10/1
1904	Sandboy	4	6-02	William Griggs	William Robinson	9/2	3:56.20
1905	Imari	4	7-04	William Saxby	Samuel Pickering	100/8	4:02.80
1906	Feather Bed	4	6-09	Arthur Templeman	J East	11/4 F	4:01.80
1907	Querido	4	8-00	John Reiff	R Carter Jr.	9/4 F	4:00.00
1908	Glacis	4	7-08	Frank Wootton	George Lambton	13/2	4:13.00
1909	Santo Strato	4	9-00	Otto Madden	John Watson	4/1 F	3:58.80
1910	Elizabetta	4	6-11	Stanley Wootton	Alec Taylor Jr.	8/1	4:06.40
1911	Willonyx	4	8-02	Billy Higgs	Sam Darling	7/1	4:04.20
1912	Rathlea	7	7-05	Charlie Foy	Tom Coulthwaite	8/1	3:57.80
1913	The Guller	4	6-06	James Ledson	J Osborne	20/1	4:13.80
1914	Aleppo	5	8-04	Charlie Foy	Alec Taylor Jr.	3/1 F	3:58.80
1915	Hare Hill	5	7-10	Steve Donoghue	William Robinson	11/2	4:07.00
	no race 1916–18
1919	Tom Pepper	4	7-04	Joe Shatwell	John Rogers	100/8	4:00.00
1920	Our Stephen	4	7-01	Arthur Balding	V Hobbs	6/1	4:14.60
1921	Meeting Abandoned due to a National Coal Strike
1922	Chivairous	4	7-05	George Smith	Harry Cottrill	50/1	4:02.00
1923	Chivairous	5	8-11	Michael Beary	Harry Cottrill	100/14	4:04.80
1924	Rugeley	4	6-04	Henry Leach	Ralph Moreton	10/1	4:14.00
1925	Spithead	6	8-07	Tommy Weston	George Lambton	6/1	4:10.80
1926	Hidennis	5	7-00	Joseph Caldwell	Harvey Leader	11/2	4:10.80
1927	Dark Japan	4	8-11	Charlie Smirke	Richard Dawson	4/1 JF	4:09.60
1928	St Mary's Kirk	5	7-00	William Alford	Atty Persse	25/1	3:59.80
1929	First Flight	4	7-07	Freddie Fox	Fred Leader	9/1	4:15.00
1930	Mountain Lad	5	7-11	Freddy Lane	Richard Gooch	20/1	4:09.80
1931	Brown Jack	7	9-06	Michael Beary	Ivor Anthony	100/8	4:03.80
1932	Bonny Brighteyes	4	7-03	Joe Dines	Matthew Peacock	20/1	4:25.00
1933	Dick Turpin	4	7-10	Gordon Richards	Martin Hartigan	9/1	4:04.20
1934	Blue Vision	7	7-11	Freddie Fox	Ivor Anthony	100/6	4:05.00
1935	Damascus	4	7-01	Humphrey Foster	George Lambton	10/1	4:00.00
1936	Cho-sen	4	7-02	Joe Dines	Billy Higgs	100/7	4:05.40
1937	Faites Vos Jeux	6	7-04	Peter Maher	Harry Cottrill	8/1	4:00.60
1938	Mr Grundy	4	7-05	Clifford Richards	Joe Lawson	10/1	3:59.60
1939	Winnebar	5	7-12	Gordon Richards	Fred Templeman	100/8	4:03.40
	no race 1940–45
1946	Retsel	4	7-09	Clifford Richards	George Todd	4/1	4:01.60
1947	Asmodee II	4	9-01	Tommy Burn	William Halsey	10/1	4:19.60
1948	Billett	4	8-03	Billy Nevett	Harry Wragg	5/1	3:59.20
1949	John Moore	5	6-10	Jock Carson	H Weatherill	25/1	4:04.40
1950	Heron Bridge	6	9-07	Tommy Burns	D Rogers	11/2 F	4:10.60
1951	Wood Leopard	4	7-05	Jack Egan	Jack Colling	20/1	4:11.20
1952	Le Tellier	7	8-11	Geoff Littlewood	Geoffrey Barling	6/1	4:19.00
1953	Eastern Emperor	5	9-02	Bill Rickaby	Jack Jarvis	2/1 F	4:01.60
1954	Peperium	4	8-06	Edgar Britt	Charles Elsey	13/2	4:03.20
1955	Prescription	4	8-09	Bill Rickaby	Jack Jarvis	8/1	4:14.50
1956	Golovine	6	8-02	Peter Robinson	Harry Wragg	9/2 F	4:03.40
1957	Curry	6	8-00	Josh Gifford	Sam Armstrong	11/4	3:59.20
1958	Sandiacre	6	8-05	Lester Piggott	W Dutton	15/2	4:07.00
1959	Agreement	5	9-04	Harry Carr	Cecil Boyd-Rochfort	3/1 F	4:08.40
1960	Trelawney	4	7-11	Frankie Durr	Syd Mercer	100/6	3:59.60
1961	Hoy	5	8-00	Geoff Lewis	Syd Dale	15/2	4:24.20
1962	Golden Fire	4	7-09	David Yates	Doug Marks	7/1	4:10.20
1963	Narratus	5	7-05	David Yates	Dave Thom	8/1	4:06.80
1964	Credo	4	8-03	Paul Cook	Paddy Prendergast	4/1 F	4:03.60
1965	Harvest Gold	6	7-11	Frankie Durr	Tommy Robson	11/2	4:16.40
1966	Aegean Blue	4	8-07	Lester Piggott	Fulke Johnson Houghton	22/1	4:13.20
1967	Mahbub Aly	6	8-06	Paul Cook	Dick Hern	7/1	4:15.80
1968	Major Rose	6	8-07	Lester Piggott	Ryan Price	11/4 F	4:17.00
1969	Abandoned due to waterlogging
1970	Altogether	4	7-05	Walter Bentley	W Murray	33/1	4:06.20
1971	Random Shot	4	8-01	Frankie Durr	Arthur Budgett	6/1	4:01.00
1972	Eric	5	7-00	Alan Cressy	Vernon Cross	22/1	4:12.00
1973	Crisalgo	5	7-07	Walter Bentley	J A Turner	12/1	4:08.01
1974	Attivo	4	7-05	Roger Wernham	Cyril Mitchell	6/1	4:06.78
1975	Super Nova	5	7-07	Ernie Johnson	Charlie Hall	11/2	4:01.92
1976	John Cherry	5	9-04	Lester Piggott	Jeremy Tree	5/1	4:24.95
1977	Sea Pigeon	7	8-08	Mark Birch	Peter Easterby	7/1	4:09.89
1978	Sea Pigeon	8	9-07	Mark Birch	Peter Easterby	10/1	4:04.47
1979	Charlotte's Choice	4	8-04	Willie Carson	Bill Wightman	10/1	4:13.40
1980	Arapahos	5	9-05	Steve Cauthen	Barry Hills	7/2	4:06.13
1981	Donegal Prince	5	8-04	Paddy Young	Paul Kelleway	12/1	4:09.50
1982	Dawn Johnny	5	8-08	Walter Swinburn	Michael Stoute	14/1	4:03.95
1983	Abandoned due to waterlogging
1984	Contester	4	8-02	Geoff Baxter	Peter Cundell	22/1	4:03.13
1985	Morgans Choice	8	7-11	Willie Carson	John Hill	13/2	4:07.47
1986	Western Dancer	5	9-00	Paul Cook	Con Horgan	14/1	4:10.49
1987	Just David	4	9-08	Michael Roberts	Alec Stewart	10/1	3:57.26
1988	Old Hubert	7	7-08	Taffy Thomas	Alan Bailey	33/1	4:34.58
1989	Grey Salute	6	8-07	Pat Eddery	John Jenkins	7/1	3:57.99
1990	Travelling Light	4	9-01	Alan Munro	Lynda Ramsden	5/2 F	4:10.18
1991	Star Player	5	8-10	Frankie Dettori	John Baker	9/2	4:13.41
1992	Welshman	6	7-08	Jimmy Quinn	Michael Blanshard	11/1	3:57.96
1993	Rodeo Star	7	7-13	Nicky Carlisle	Nigel Tinkler	9/1	4:02.51
1994	Doyce	5	7-10	Gary Bardwell	Robert Williams	14/1	4:03.18
1995	Top Cees	5	8-08	Kieren Fallon	Lynda Ramsden	8/1	4:03.35
1996	Merit	4	7-10	Jimmy Quinn	Paul Cole	11/2	4:06.63
1997	Top Cees	7	8-11	Jimmy Fortune	Lynda Ramsden	11/2	4:23.18
1998	Silence in Court	7	9-00	Allan Mackay	Alan Bailey	13/2	4:06.63
1999	Rainbow High	4	9-00	Michael Hills	Barry Hills	4/1 F	4:00.64
2000	Bangalore	4	7-10	Gary Bardwell	Amanda Perrett	16/1	4:03.00
2001	Rainbow High	6	9-13	Richard Hughes	Barry Hills	9/2	4:01.23
2002	Fantasy Hill	6	8-09	Pat Eddery	John Dunlop	8/1	4:00.20
2003	Hugs Dancer	6	8-11	Dean McKeown	James Given	9/1	4:04.89
2004	Anak Pekan	4	8-02	Philip Robinson	Michael Jarvis	2/1 F	4:10.90
2005	Anak Pekan	5	9-06	Philip Robinson	Michael Jarvis	16/1	4:14.60
2006	Admiral	5	8-01	John Egan	Tim Pitt	28/1	4:03.34
2007	Greenwich Meantime	7	9-02	Paul Hanagan	Richard Fahey	14/1	3:58.89
2008	Bulwark	6	9-04	Jim Crowley	Ian Williams	33/1	4:06.57
2009	Daraahem	4	9-00	Richard Hills	Barry Hills	7/1	4:04.01
2010	Mamlook	6	8-12	Richard Hughes	David Pipe	7/1 F	4:03.74
2011	Overturn	7	8-13	Eddie Ahern	Donald McCain	11/2	3:59.39
2012	Ile de Re	6	8-11	Jim Crowley	Donald McCain	10/1	4:10.20
2013	Address Unknown	6	9-00	Jamie Spencer	Richard Fahey	12/1	4:05.31
2014	Suegioo	5	9-04	Ryan Moore	Marco Botti	10/1	4:07.85
2015	Trip To Paris	4	8-09	Graham Lee	Ed Dunlop	10/1	4:12.87
2016	No Heretic	8	8-13	Jamie Spencer	Nicky Henderson	11/1	4:10.48
2017	Montaly	6	9-06	Oisin Murphy	Andrew Balding	16/1	4:03.37
2018	Magic Circle	6	9-03	Fran Berry	Ian Williams	8/1	4:02.90
2019	Making Miracles	4	9-00	Franny Norton	Mark Johnston	16/1	4:33.09
	no race 2020 (Note: The 2020 running was cancelled because of the COVID-19 pandemic in the United Kingdom)
2021	Falcon Eight	6	9-10	Frankie Dettori	Dermot Weld	15/2	4:07.11
2022	Cleveland	4	9-00	Ryan Moore	Aidan O'Brien	6/1	4:04.13
2023	Metier	7	9-01	Saffie Osborne	Harry Fry	5/1	4:15.48
2024	Zoffee	8	8–07	Harry Davies	Hugo Palmer	9/1	3:59.16
2025	East India Dock	4	8-08	Harry Davies	James Owen	9/4 F	4:05.76
2026	A Piece Of Heaven	8	9-06	Dylan Browne McMonagle	Joseph O'Brien	7/1	4:01:19

== Earlier winners ==
- 1824: Doge of Venice
- 1825: Hymettus
- 1826: Brutandorf
- 1827: Grenadier
- 1828: Fylde
- 1829: Halston
- 1830: Felt
- 1831: Independence
- 1832: Colwick
- 1833: Pickpocket
- 1834: The Cardinal
- 1835: Birdlime
- 1836: Tanworth
- 1837: General Chasse
- 1838: King Cole
- 1839: Cardinal Puff
- 1840: Dey of Algiers
- 1841: Cruiskeen
- 1842: Alice Hawthorn
- 1843: Millepede
- 1844: Red Deer
- 1845: Intrepid
- 1846: Corranna
- 1847: St Lawrence
- 1848: Peep-o-Day-Boy
- 1849: Malton
- 1850: Mounseer
- 1851: Nancy
- 1852: Joe Miller
- 1853: Goldfinder
- 1854: Epaminondas
- 1855: Scythian
- 1856: One Act
- 1857: Leamington
- 1858: Vanity
- 1859: Leamington
- 1860: St Albans
- 1861: Ben Webster
- 1862: Tim Whiffler
- 1863: Asteroid
- 1864: Flash in the Pan
- 1865: Dalby
- 1866: Dalby
- 1867: Beeswing
- 1868: Paul Jones
- 1869: Knight of the Garter
- 1870: Our Mary Ann
- 1871: Glenlivat
- 1872: Inveresk
- 1873: Field Marshal
- 1874: Organist
- 1875: Freeman
- 1876: Tam o'Shanter
- 1877: Pageant
- 1878: Pageant
- 1879: Reefer
- 1880: Fashion
- 1881: Windsor
- 1882: Prudhomme
- 1883: Biserta
- 1884: Havock
- 1885: Merry Prince
- 1886: Eastern Emperor
- 1887: Carlton
- 1888: Kinsky
- 1889: Mill Stream

== See also ==
- Horse racing in Great Britain
- List of British flat horse races
- Recurring sporting events established in 1824 – this race is included under its original title, Tradesmen's Cup.
