= Comedy of Errors (horse) =

British-bred Thoroughbred National Hunt racehorse (1967–1990)

- Sire: Goldhill
- Grandsire: Le Dieu d'Or
- Dam: Comedy Actress
- Damsire: Kingsway
- Sex: Gelding
- Foaled: 1967
- Country: United Kingdom
- Colour: Brown
- Breeder: Elizabeth Sykes
- Owner: Harold Plotnek and Ted Wheatley
- Trainer: Fred Rimell
- Record: 48:23-11-4

Major wins
- Fighting Fifth Hurdle (1972, 1973, 1974); Cheltenham Trial (1973, 1974); Irish Sweeps Hurdle (1973, 1974); Champion Hurdle (1973, 1975); Welsh Champion Hurdle (1973); Scottish Champion Hurdle (1975); Templegate Hurdle (1976)

Awards
- Timeform rating 178

Comedy of Errors (1967–1990) was a champion British Thoroughbred National Hunt racehorse. He won the Champion Hurdle in 1973 and 1975, becoming one of only two horses to regain British hurdling's top prize. A huge, handsome horse of over 17 hands, "Comedy", as he was affectionately known, won 23 of 48 races. His trainer Fred Rimell considered him the best ever at Kinnersley stables, while his wife Mercy, who was an integral part of the training operation at Kinnersley, felt "he was a freak", considering his enormous build and tendency to jump to the right, as his jockey Bill Smith noted. Timeform rate him as the leading hurdler of the mid-1970s and among the top half-dozen hurdlers ever in Britain.

== Background ==
Comedy of Errors was a brown horse sired by the King's Stand Stakes winner Goldhill out of the mare Comedy Actress. He was trained by Fred Rimell at Kinnersley in Worcestershire and ridden by Terry Biddlecombe, Bill Smith and Ken White. The latter two piloted the horse to his Champion Hurdle wins.

== Racing career ==
Comedy of Errors finished second in the Gloucestershire Hurdle at the 1972 Cheltenham Festival.

In 1973, he won his first Champion Hurdle, beating Bula who had won the race in 1971 and 1972.

He finished runner-up to Lanzarote in the 1974 championship but returned to regain the title in 1975 – the first horse to do so. That victory saw him overtake Arkle as National Hunt's leading prize-winner.

Among Comedy of Errors' other top-class wins are the Fighting Fifth Hurdle in three consecutive years (1972–1974), the Scottish Champion Hurdle, the Welsh Champion Hurdle, the International Hurdle twice, the Irish Sweeps Hurdle twice and the Templegate Hurdle.

== Retirement ==
After his retirement, Comedy of Errors was used for many years by Fred Rimell's wife Mercy who described him as a perfect riding horse.
