= Monksfield =

Irish-bred Thoroughbred racehorse

- Sire: Gala Performance
- Grandsire: Native Dancer
- Dam: Regina
- Damsire: Tulyar
- Sex: Stallion
- Foaled: 1972
- Country: Great Britain
- Colour: Bay
- Trainer: Des McDonogh

Major wins
- Aintree Hurdle (1977, 1978, 1979); Champion Hurdle (1978, 1979); Welsh Champion Hurdle (1979)

Honours
- Monksfield Novice Hurdle at Navan

Monksfield (1972–1989) was an entire horse Irish-trained National Hunt racehorse who won the Champion Hurdle in 1978 and 1979. He also won the Aintree Hurdle at Aintree Racecourse three times - including a dead-heat with Night Nurse, one of his two greatest rivals.

Monksfield's dam, Regina, was bred by the Aga Khan. His granddam was Tambara who won the Coronation Stakes at Ascot. His dam sire was the 1952 Derby winner Tulyar.

Monksfield cost his Irish trainer Des McDonogh only 740 guineas as a yearling, but he won five times on the flat to add to his hurdling triumphs. He won four times in his first season hurdling, as well as finishing second in the Triumph Hurdle at Cheltenham. He was runner-up in the 1977 Champion Hurdle behind Night Nurse, but triumphed in 1978, ahead of Sea Pigeon and Night Nurse. The rivalry between Monksfield and Sea Pigeon reached its peak in 1979 and 1980 with Monksfield winning the 1979 Champion Hurdle, and the latter reversing the decision - by seven lengths - a year later. Monksfield died in 1989 after nine years at stud: his best winners included Lakendara, Garrylough, Judge's Fancy and It's a Snip.
