= Philip Blacker =

British jockey and artist (born 1949)

Philip Blacker (b. 1949) was a jockey until his retirement in 1982. Since then, he has been a sculptor of sporting arts.

He is the son of General Sir Cecil Blacker.

== Career ==
=== Jockey ===
Blacker became a professional jockey at the start of the 1969/1970 season and remained so for 13 years, during which time he rode 340 winners. He is a Member of the Jockey Club, and has sat on various committees including the British Horseracing Authorities Security and Investigations Committee.

In 1973 Blacker finished fourth on Spanish Steps in the first Grand National won by Red Rum. In 1977 Blacker finished seventh on Happy Ranger to Red Rum, winning his third and final Grand National. Blacker said that 1982 was "my one big chance to win the race". However, Blacker had taken a ride at Ludlow the day before the Grand National where he fell and broke his arm. In his absence, Royal Mail was ridden by another jockey and the horse fell at Becher's Brook fence. "That horse needed a rider that knew him and on that day he didn't", commented Blacker afterwards, describing the event as "one of the biggest regrets of my life".

Amongst the 340 races won by Blacker were the: 1981 Welsh Champion Hurdle (Pollardstown), 1980 Aintree Hurdle (Pollardstown), 1980 Whitbread Gold Cup (Royal Mail), and two races at the 1979 Cheltenham Festival; the Stayers' Hurdle (Lighter) and the Triumph Hurdle (Pollardstown).

=== Sculptor ===
Blacker is considered as "one of the most important names" in 20th century sporting art by Stella A. Walker. A former art student prior to his days as a jockey, in 1987, he produced his first work: a life-size sculpture of Red Rum at Aintree Racecourse, unveiled one year later by the Princess Royal.

He has produced numerous works across the UK and abroad; including racecourse bronzes of Best Mate at Cheltenham, Generous at Epsom, Persian Punch at Newmarket, Desert Orchid at Kempton Park, Makybe Diva at Flemington in Melbourne, Northern Dancer at Woodbine in Canada and an 18-foot stallion in Saudi Arabia.

In 2014 he sculpted a series of bronze friezes featuring a number houses in a Thompson's Gallery exhibit Farewell, Leicester Square commemoration of the centenary of the First World War, which he says were based on the poetry of the era.

In January 2017 he produced a limited edition of 400 small bronze replicas of the Red Rum statue at Aintree, to celebrate the 40th Anniversary of Red Rum's third Grand National victory.
