= Monksfield Novice Hurdle =

Hurdle horse race in Ireland

'Monksfield' Novice Hurdle
2026
With Nolimit	Gillane	Pat O's Rock

Previous years
2025
Kalypso'chance	The Big Clubman	Frankie John
2024
The Yellow Clay	Where's My Jet	Fleur In The Park
2023
Croke Park	Mel Monroe	Search For Glory
2022
Dawn Rising	American Mike	Kilbarry Chloe
2021
Hollow Games	Lunar Display	Barnacullia

2020-2011
2020
Fakiera	Fire Attack	Champagne Gold
2019
Fury Road	Glamorgan Duke	Doyen Dancer
2018
Easy Game	Magnium	Choungaya
2017
Samcro	Jetz	Delta Work
2016
Death Duty	She's A Star	Stand Up And Fight
2015
Falcon Crest	Moylisha Tim	Last Encounter
2013
Apache Stronghold	Azorian	Carriganog
2012
Busty Brown	Seefood	Bonisland
2011
Mount Benbulben	Rebel Fitz	Make A Track

2010-2001
2010
Fully Funded	Gift Of Dgab	Ballyburke
2009
The Hurl	Quietly Fancied	Judge Roy Bean
2008
Pandorama	Alpha Ridge	No Full
2007
Rathmore Castle	Gem Daly	Clew Bay Lodge
2006
Footy Facts	Casey Jones	Derravarra Eagle
2005
Powerstation	Travino	Vic Venturi
2004
Sweet Kiln	Petertheknot	Tasman
2003
Kadiskar	Always	In The Dip
2002
Pizarro	Solerina	Nonchalant
2001
Over The Bar	Spirit Leader	Hill Port

2000-1995
2000
Get It Done	Native Endurance	Carmelite
1999
Oa Baldixe	Lord Of The Turf	Leaderman
1997
Promalee	Go Roger Go	Texarkana
1996
Tarthooth	Radanpour	Gallopen Garry
1995
Clahada Rose	Gentle Buck	Ciara's Prince

The Monksfield Novice Hurdle is a Grade 3 National Hunt novice hurdle race in Ireland which is open to horses aged four years or older. It is run at Navan over a distance of about 2 miles and 4 furlongs (4,023 metres), and it is scheduled to take place each year in November.

The event was first run in 1995 and is named after Monksfield, a successful Irish-trained hurdler in the late 1970s. For a time it was classed at Grade 3 level, and it was promoted to Grade 2 status in 2008. It was downgraded to Grade 3 again in 2016.

== Records ==
Leading jockey (5 wins):

- Jack Kennedy - Samcro (2017), Croke Park (2023), The Yellow Clay (2024), Kalypso'chance (2025), With Nolimit (2026)

Leading trainer (11 wins):

- Gordon Elliott - Mount Benbulben (2011), Free Expression (2014), Death Duty (2016), Samcro (2017), Fury Road (2019), Fakiera (2020), Hollow Games (2021), Croke Park (2023), The Yellow Clay (2024), Kalypso'chance (2025), With Nolimit (2026)

== Winners ==
Year	Winner	Age	Jockey	Trainer
1995	Clahada Rose	5	Charlie Swan	Aidan O'Brien
1996	Tarthooth	5	Francis Woods	Arthur Moore
1997	Promalee	5	Charlie Swan	Aidan O'Brien
1998	To Your Honour	5	Fran Flood	Francis Flood
1999	Oa Baldixe	5	Paul Carberry	Noel Meade
2000	Get It Done	5	Norman Williamson	Edward O'Grady
2001	Over the Bar	5	Charlie Swan	Edward O'Grady
2002	Pizarro	5	Norman Williamson	Edward O'Grady
2003	Kadiskar	5	Conor O'Dwyer	Christy Roche
2004	Sweet Kiln	5	Gary Hutchinson	James Bowe
2005	Powerstation	5	Davy Russell	Charles Byrnes
2006	Footy Facts	6	Ruby Walsh	Robert Tyner
2007	Rathmore Castle	5	David Casey	Maureen Danagher
2008	Pandorama	5	Paul Carberry	Noel Meade
2009	The Hurl	6	Niall Madden	Mouse Morris
2010	Fully Funded	5	Davy Condon	Noel Meade
2011	Mount Benbulben	6	Davy Condon	Gordon Elliott
2012	Busty Brown	6	Paul Carberry	Noel Meade
2013	Apache Stronghold	5	Paul Carberry	Noel Meade
2014	Free Expression	5	Mark Walsh	Gordon Elliott
2015	Falcon Crest	5	Barry Geraghty	Christy Roche
2016	Death Duty	5	Bryan Cooper	Gordon Elliott
2017	Samcro	5	Jack Kennedy	Gordon Elliott
2018	Easy Game	4	Ruby Walsh	Willie Mullins
2019	Fury Road	5	Davy Russell	Gordon Elliott
2020	Fakiera	5	Keith Donoghue	Gordon Elliott
2021	Hollow Games	5	Davy Russell	Gordon Elliott
2022	Dawn Rising	5	Mark Walsh	Joseph O'Brien
2023	Croke Park	5	Jack Kennedy	Gordon Elliott
2024	The Yellow Clay	5	Jack Kennedy	Gordon Elliott
2025	Kalypso'chance	5	Jack Kennedy	Gordon Elliott
2026	Kalypso'chance	5	Jack Kennedy	Gordon Elliott

== See also ==
- Horse racing in Ireland
- List of Irish National Hunt races
