= Jimmy Duggan (jockey) =

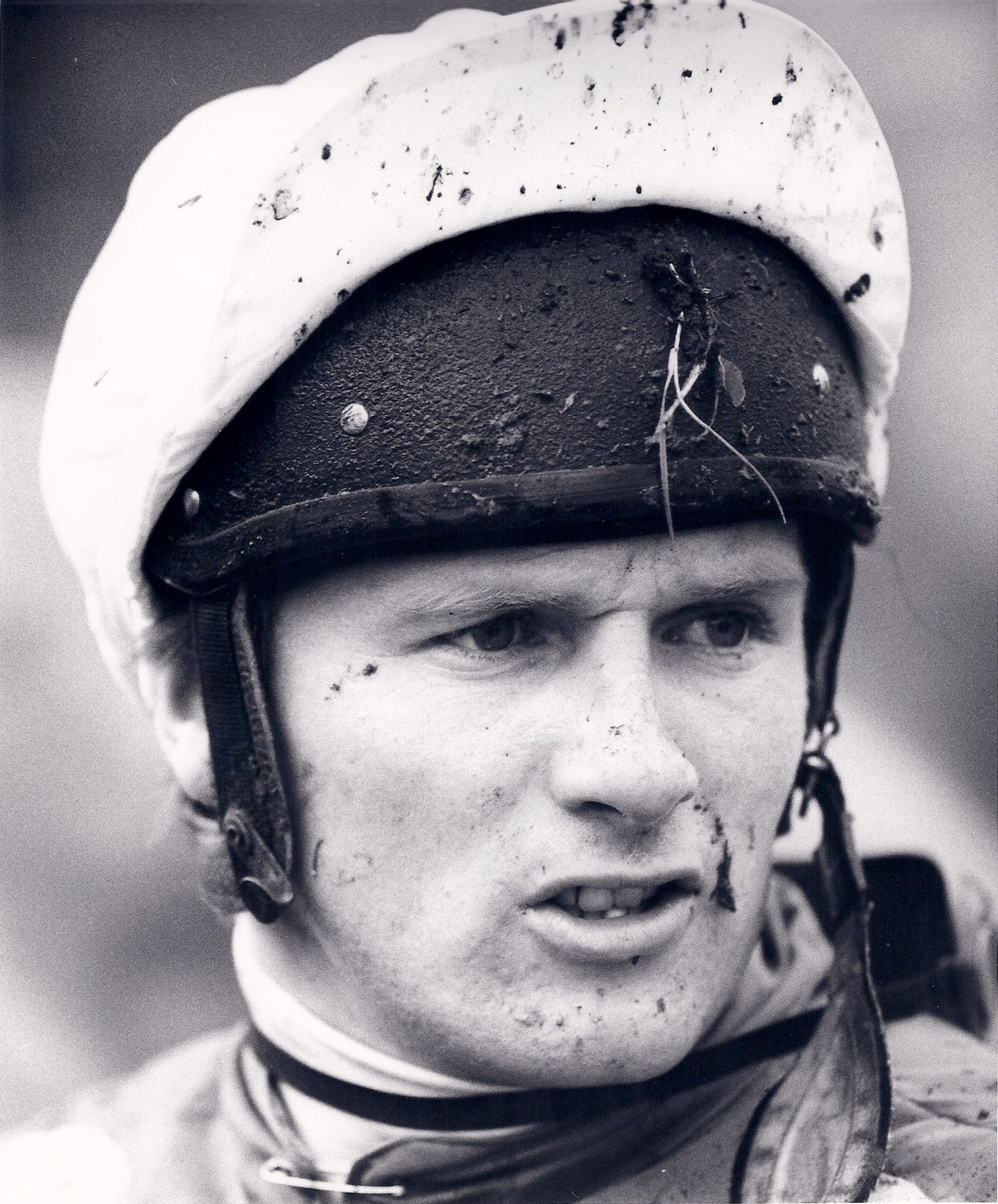
Jimmy Duggan

Jimmy Duggan (born 9 August 1964, in Hillingdon, Middlesex) is a former English national hunt jockey.

Having his first competitive race ride on 22 October 1979. His first winner came five months later at an Irish point-to-point meeting on 10 February 1980. His first of 311 professional victories came at Leopardstown when riding "Killeenyarda" in February 1982. Duggan took up his apprenticeship in England under the wing of Ulverston trainer Roger Fisher, where his association with horses such as Amarach and Aonoch came into fruition.

It was in the 1983 Bula Hurdle at Cheltenham where at the age of 19 Duggan had his first big race winner when riding Amarach.

On leaving the yard of Roger Fisher, Duggan moved south to the Lambourn stables of renowned champion trainer and former champion jockey Fred Winter, where he was to be associated with such horses as Aces Wild, Sailors Dance, Ulan Bator, Conquering and the only Fred Winter-owned horse in the yard Bargill.

Also Duggan had two winning rides on Celtic Shot, before the partnership were bought down in the Supreme Novices' Hurdle at Cheltenham, he was subsequently to lose that ride to Peter Scudamore and they later won the 1986 Champion Hurdle.

Along with Sailors Dance Duggan won the 1985 Scottish Champion Hurdle, at Ayr.

When both Amarach and Aonoch were moved to trainer Sally Oliver's yard in Worcestershire, the association with the pair was continued. Unfortunately Amarach's racing career was cut short following a training injury.

One of Jimmy Duggan's most memorable winning rides came at Aintree, Liverpool in the guise of the 1986 Sandemans Hurdle, where the partnership took on a number of top class hurdlers, including the three times and reigning Champion Hurdler, See You Then. The pair battled it out, side by side, up the run in to the line, Aonoch holding on to beat the champion by a neck, with Duggan giving Aonoch a tremendous ride of strength and precision, two of Duggan's trademarks.

The jockeys' most disappointing moment in his career was probably a ride on Aonoch, whom Duggan actually rode a total of 14 victories on, was undoubtedly in the 1986 Champion Hurdle for Sally Oliver, they were being touted for at the very least a place, however from the outset of the race Duggan had his fears that something was not quite right with fellow, Aonoch was not feeling right, not moving fluently, he never got into his running and was most disappointing, finishing tailed off and without ever once having been put into the race, most uncharacteristic of the little horse who was renowned as a battler. Duggan was quick to realise that the horse was suffering from corns, which was an ailment that plagued the horse from time to time. However, after the race it was realised that there was another factor to his bad running, in that the horse suffered a heavy blow to his head when at the fourth hurdle Corporal Clinger fell in front of Aonoch and caught him. On his return from the course Aonoch was bleeding profusely from both nostrils, which he recovered from. All of that was forgotten just 25 days later at Aintree with the famous victory over See You Then.

Since retiring from the saddle, Jimmy Duggan has since moved to the United States where he has become a successful businessman, now married to his wife Jane (July 2003) with one daughter, Grace.

Jimmy is also well known face on American television, as the voice of steeplechasing and leading steeplechase analyst in the country.
