= Sexual Citizenship =

- Author: David T. Evans
- Publisher: Routledge
- Publication date: 1993
- Pages: 362
- ISBN: 978-0415058001

Sexual Citizenship: The Material Construction of Sexualities is a book by David T. Evans.
