= Bobby Beasley =

Irish jockey & horse trainer (1935–2008)

Personal information
- Full name: Henry Robert Beasley
- Born: 26 August 1935 London UK
- Died: 9 January 2008 (aged 72) Hastings, East Sussex UK
- Occupation: Jockey

Horse racing career
- Sport: Horse racing

Major racing wins
- National Hunt; Galway Plate (1960); Cheltenham Gold Cup (1959, 1974); Grand National (1961)

Significant horses
- Roddy Owen, Nicolaus Silver, Captain Christy

Bobby Beasley (26 August 1935 – 9 January 2008) was an Irish jockey and horse trainer.

== Background ==
Beasley was born in London in to an Irish racing family. His father, Harry, also known as "HH" Beasley, was an outstanding flat jockey and rode the winner of two Irish Derbys. Beasley's grandfather, also named Harry, trained and rode Come Away to victory in the 1891 Grand National. His great-uncle, Tommy, was twice Irish Champion Jockey and won the Grand National at Aintree on three occasions (Empress 1880, Woodbrook 1881 and Frigate 1889).

== Jockey ==
He was reared in Ireland. His first winner was as an amateur came at Leopardstown when he was sixteen years of age. Three years later he enjoyed his first winner as a professional at Naas.

In 1960 he captured the Champion Hurdle on Another Flash.

In 1961 he was victorious in the Grand National with Nicolaus Silver at odds of 28/1. He was among the leaders from early on the second circuit and gradually drew clear over the final two fences to win by five lengths. Nicholas Silver became the first and only grey to win the race during the 20th century.

In 1963 he was victorious in the Mackeson Gold Cup on Richard of Bordeaux. In 1966 he won the Triumph Hurdle aboard Black Ice.

=== Roddy Owen ===
Beasley rode Roddy Owen in the 1959 Cheltenham Gold Cup. He was trained by Danny Morgan and owned by Lord Fingall. The horse was named after amateur rider Roddy Owen who won the 1892 Grand National aboard Father O'Flynn. Roddy Owen was joint second favourite at odds of 5/1. The outright favourite was Taxidermist, the winner of the 1958 Hennessy Gold Cup. Coming to the final fence Pas Seul was in the lead with Linwell and Lochroe in hot pursuit. Roddy Owen was in fourth just behind the leaders. Despite an otherwise flawless jumping performance Pas Seul fell at the last coming down in Linwell's Path. As a result, he came to a standstill, hampering Lochroe. Taking full advantage of the others' misfortune, Beasley steered Roddy Owen into the lead and won by three lengths from Linwell.

== Alcoholism ==
However Beasley struggled with his drink problem. As a result, he was let go as stable jockey to Fred Winter who was one of the most successful trainers of the day. He retired as a jockey in 1969. His recovery began when his friend Nicky Rackard convinced him to join Alcoholics Anonymous.

== Comeback ==
In February 1971, aged 35, he resumed his career riding Norwegian Flag to victory at Leopardstown.

== Captain Christy ==
Christy gave me back my self-respect. He made a huge difference to my life and was a hell of a horse. I sometimes think of the mistake he made at the last fence. Imagine if he'd fallen. How would I have been able to live with that? I'd have been haunted for the rest of my days.

— Bobby Beasley

He captured the Irish Sweeps Hurdle on Captain Christy. Beasley was aged 38—and had been sober for five years—when trainer Pat Taaffe, gave him the ride on Captain Christy at Cheltenham. During his brief career, Captain Christy had fallen on a number of occasions, and was a novice when he ran in the Gold Cup. During the race Captain Christy made a terrible mistake at the final fence, but Beasley remained composed and drove his mount past The Dikler, who had won the race the previous year, to win by five lengths. The Times described his victory as "the greatest comeback since Lazarus"

== Retirement ==
Beasley retired for a second time and began training in England with his second wife, Linda, at Lewes and Marlborough. He also managed a pub and worked in a vineyard.

== Personal life ==
In 1960 Beasley married Shirley Thompson, a daughter of jockey Arthur Thompson, who triumphed in the Grand National in 1948 and 1952. The couple had three children. He later married for a second time to Linda. They had one son.
