= Captain Christy =

Irish-bred Thoroughbred racehorse

- Racing silks of Mrs Jane Samuel
- Sire: Mon Capitaine
- Grandsire: Wild Risk
- Dam: Christys Bow
- Damsire: Bowsprit
- Sex: Gelding
- Foaled: 1967
- Country: Ireland
- Colour: Bay
- Owner: Major Joe Pidcock; Mrs Jane Samuel
- Trainer: Garrett Dooley; Major Joe Piddock; Pat Taaffe

Major wins
- Irish Sweeps Hurdle (1972); Scottish Champion Hurdle (1973); Cheltenham Gold Cup (1974); King George VI Chase (1974, 1975); John Durkan Memorial Chase (1975); Irish Champion Hurdle (1973); Powers Gold Cup (1974)

Honours
- Timeform rating 182
- Last updated on 16 September 2021

Captain Christy (foaled 1967) was a champion Irish-bred and Irish-trained hurdler and steeplechaser who won the Cheltenham Gold Cup as a novice.

In spite of a tendency to make mistakes, Captain Christy was an outstanding hurdler and one of the best steeplechasers of all time. He was the top-rated steeplechaser in Great Britain and Ireland for three successive seasons, 1972–73 to 1975–76. His most outstanding performance was his 30-length win over Bula and other top horses in the 1975 King George VI Chase at Kempton Park; this is regarded as one of the greatest ever steeplechasing performances. Gerry Newman rode him in that race, but for most of his other successes his jockeys were Bobby Beasley and Bobby Coonan. That 1975 victory over Bula was the second time he had beaten the dual Champion Hurdle winner; he had also outgalloped him when winning the 1972 Irish Sweeps Hurdle when the race was a championship (non-handicap) event. He finished third in that year's Champion Hurdle at Cheltenham before winning the Scottish equivalent. Captain Christy's most important success came in the 1974 Cheltenham Gold Cup when, as a novice ridden by Bobby Beasley, he beat the previous year's winner, The Dikler, by five lengths despite making a mistake at the last fence. Later that year he won his first King George VI Chase when, ridden by Bobby Coonan, he easily beat the outstanding three-mile chaser Pendil, who had won the race in 1972 and 1973. In 1975 Captain Christy finished a close second under top-weight in the Whitbread Gold Cup giving over two stone in weight to the winner, April the Seventh. He also raced beyond Great Britain and Ireland, including finishing runner-up in the Grand Steeple-Chase de Paris and coming fourth in the Colonial Cup in the USA. Captain Christy developed a leg problem after his 1975 King George VI Chase win, which effectively ended his career while still a relatively young horse. Throughout the illustrious period of his career, Captain Christy was trained by Pat Taaffe. After his 1975 King George win, and injury, he was controversially transferred by his owner, Jane Samuel, to the stables of Francis Flood, under whose care Captain Chisty made a comeback in the 1978 Troytown Handicap Chase, finishing sixth. Although he finished sound, it was not possible to prepare him for another race.
