= Sea Pigeon =

American-bred Thoroughbred racehorse

- Sire: Sea-Bird
- Grandsire: Dan Cupid
- Dam: Around the Roses
- Damsire: Round Table
- Sex: Gelding
- Foaled: 1970
- Country: Ireland
- Colour: Brown
- Breeder: Greentree Stud
- Owner: Jock Whitney; Pat Muldoon
- Trainer: Jeremy Tree; Gordon W. Richards; Peter Easterby
- Record: 85: 37-?-?
- Earnings: £227,000

Major wins
- Chester Cup (1977, 1978); Ebor Handicap (1979); Champion Hurdle (1980, 1981); Scottish Champion Hurdle (1977, 1978); Fighting Fifth Hurdle (1978, 1980); Welsh Champion Hurdle (1980)

Awards
- Timeforn rating 175

Sea Pigeon (1970–2000) was an American-bred, British-trained racehorse who excelled in both National Hunt and flat racing. In a racing career which lasted from 1972 until 1981 he competed in eighty-five races, and won thirty-seven times. He was best known for his performances in hurdle races when he won the Champion Hurdle on two occasions. He was also one of the best flat stayers of his era winning major handicap races under weights of up to 140 pounds. On his retirement he was described as Britain's "best known horse after Arkle and Red Rum.

== Background ==
Sea Pigeon was a dark-brown horse bred by his owner, Jock Whitney at the Greentree Stud in the United States. He was sired by the great Derby winner Sea Bird. Sea Pigeon's dam, Around the Roses, ran second in the Acorn Stakes and went on to produce the American turf champion Bowl Game. As a yearling Sea Pigeon was sent into training with Jeremy Tree in England.

== Racing career ==
Sea Pigeon won once as a two-year-old in October 1972, when he was ridden to victory by Lester Piggott in the Duke of Edinburgh Stakes at Ascot. In early 1973, he was considered a serious contender for the Classics. He ran in the 1973 Epsom Derby and finished seventh behind Morston. By the end of 1973, Sea Pigeon's indifferent form led to him being thought "ungenuine, highly-strung and difficult to handle." He was subsequently gelded and was sold for £8,000 to Pat Muldoon, who sent the horse to National Hunt trainer Gordon W. Richards.

After showing modest form on the flat in 1974, Sea Pigeon was switched to hurdles. In his first two seasons as a hurdler, he showed steadily improving form, winning several races and finishing placed behind notable hurdlers including Lanzarote and Birds Nest. In late 1976, after a defeat at Kempton, Sea Pigeon joined Peter (M.H.) Easterby's stable at Habton Grange near Malton, North Yorkshire. In the second half of the 1976–77 National Hunt season, he became a top-class performer in hurdle races, finishing fourth to his stable companion Night Nurse in the Champion Hurdle and winning the Scottish Champion Hurdle at Ayr.

His flat career also started to blossom with a succession of wins in top handicaps - he won the Chester Cup in 1977 and 1978, and the Ebor Handicap carrying 10 stone, which is still a record, in 1979. Sea Pigeon was ridden to his Ebor win by his regular hurdles partner Jonjo O'Neill – due to the long ITV strike of that year, only those who were present at York that day saw it.

He missed the early part of the 1977–78 jumps season after being injured in the Colonial Cup but returned in spring to finish runner-up to Monksfield in the Champion Hurdle. He won a second Scottish Champion Hurdle, taking advantage of the fatal fall of Golden Cygnet at the final flight. In the following season, his best performances came when beating Birds Nest in the Fighting Fifth Hurdle and finishing second again to Monksfield in the Champion Hurdle. Sea Pigeon suffered from injury problems in the autumn of 1979 but returned to form in spring 1980. He won the Champion Hurdle at his fourth attempt, beating Monksfield by seven lengths. Before the end of the season, he added a victory in the Welsh Champion Hurdle. A year later, he won a second Fighting Fifth Hurdle and a second Champion Hurdle in March, becoming the oldest-ever winner of the race. In the Champion Hurdle, the performance of his jockey, John Francome, who replaced the injured O'Neill, has been described as one of the best in Cheltenham history.

Having contracted a virus, shortly before the 1981 Aintree Festival, Sea Pigeon never recovered fully and ran poorly in two races in the autumn of 1981. He was retired just before the 1982 Cheltenham Festival. He had won 21 races from 40 starts over jumps and 16 races from 45 starts on the flat.

== Retirement ==
During his retirement Sea Pigeon was housed with trainer Pat Rohan for some time and could often be seen having a stroll round the streets of Norton much to the joy of the locals. Later he spent twelve years under the care of Polly Tierney/Perkins at her yard in Sherriff Hutton, near Malton.

Even when Jonjo O'Neill turned his hand to training across the Pennines in Skelton, his bond with Sea Pigeon was far from over. The former jockey would often turn up unannounced just to spend some time with his old friend. This bond continued until Sea Pigeon was found to have irreparable damage to one of his pedal bones and was put to sleep on Tuesday 20 October 2000. He was buried at Easterby's Habton Grange stable, next to his stable companion and racecourse rival Night Nurse.

== Assessment ==
Sea Pigeon was rated at 175 by Timeform for five consecutive seasons from 1976–77 to 1980–81. He was the highest rated hurdler in both his championship seasons and at the time of his retirement was the fifth-highest rated hurdler in the organisation's history. Sea Pigeon now ranks in the top-16 all-time list.

In their book A Century of Champions, John Randal and Tony Morris ranked Sea Pigeon the tenth best British or Irish hurdler of the 20th century.

== Pedigree ==
Pedigree of Sea Pigeon, brown gelding 1970
| Sire Sea-Bird (FR) 1962 | Dan Cupid (USA); 1956 | Native Dancer | Polynesian |
| Sire Sea-Bird (FR) 1962 | Dan Cupid (USA); 1956 | Native Dancer | Geisha |
| Sire Sea-Bird (FR) 1962 | Dan Cupid (USA); 1956 | Vixenette | Sickle |
| Sire Sea-Bird (FR) 1962 | Dan Cupid (USA); 1956 | Vixenette | Lady Reynard |
| Sire Sea-Bird (FR) 1962 | Sicalade (FR); 1956 | Sicambre | Prince Bio |
| Sire Sea-Bird (FR) 1962 | Sicalade (FR); 1956 | Sicambre | Sif |
| Sire Sea-Bird (FR) 1962 | Sicalade (FR); 1956 | Mamelade | Maurepas |
| Sire Sea-Bird (FR) 1962 | Sicalade (FR); 1956 | Mamelade | Couleur |
| Dam Around The Roses (USA) 1963 | Round Table (USA); 1954 | Princequillo | Prince Rose |
| Dam Around The Roses (USA) 1963 | Round Table (USA); 1954 | Princequillo | Cosquilla |
| Dam Around The Roses (USA) 1963 | Round Table (USA); 1954 | Knights Daughter | Sir Cosmo |
| Dam Around The Roses (USA) 1963 | Round Table (USA); 1954 | Knights Daughter | Feola |
| Dam Around The Roses (USA) 1963 | Rose Coral (IRE); 1950 | Rockefella | Hyperion |
| Dam Around The Roses (USA) 1963 | Rose Coral (IRE); 1950 | Rockefella | Rockfel |
| Dam Around The Roses (USA) 1963 | Rose Coral (IRE); 1950 | Lady Mary Rose | Nearco |
| Dam Around The Roses (USA) 1963 | Rose Coral (IRE); 1950 | Lady Mary Rose | Rosemain (Family 26) |
