= Mark Tompkins (racehorse trainer) =

British racehorse trainer

Mark Tompkins is a British racehorse trainer. He is currently the chairman of the Newmarket Trainers Federation. He worked as an assistant for the trainers Walter Wharton and Ryan Jarvis before working he began training independently. He has been a trainer at the Flint Cottage Stables for the past thirty years.

== Horses trained ==
Mark Tompkins has trained the horses Smokey Oakey, Halkopous, and Staunch Friend. His only British Classic win race came in 1993 when Bob's Return won the St. Leger Stakes.
