= Triumph Hurdle =

Hurdle horse race in Britain

- Class: Grade 1
- Location: Cheltenham Racecourse; Cheltenham, England
- Inaugurated: 1939
- Race type: Hurdle race
- Sponsor: JCB
- Website: Cheltenham

Race information
- Distance: 2m 179y (3,382 metres)
- Surface: Turf
- Track: Left-handed
- Qualification: Four-year-olds
- Weight: 11 st 2 lb Allowances; 7 lb for fillies
- Purse: £150,000 (2025); 1st: £84,405

Triumph Hurdle
2026
| Apolon De Charnie | Maestro Conti | Minella Study |

Previous years
2025
Poniros | Lulamba | East India Dock
2024
Majborough | Kargese | Salver
2023
Lossiemouth | Gala Marceau | Zenta
2022
Vauban | Fil Dor | Pied Piper
2021
Quilixios | Adagio | Haut En Couleurs

2020-2011
2020
Burning Victory | Aspire Tower | Allmankind
2019
Pentland Hills | Coeur Sublime | Gardens of Babylon
2018
Farclas | Mr Adjudicator | Sayo
2017
Defi Du Seuil | Mega Fortune | Bapaume
2016
Ivanovich Gorbatov | Apple's Jade | Footpad
2015
Peace And Co | Top Notch | Hargam
2014
Tiger Roll | Kentucky Hyden | Guitar Pete
2013
Our Conor | Far West | Sametegal
2012
Countrywide Flame | Hisaabaat | Grumeti
2011
Zarkandar | Unaccompanied | Grandouet

2010-2001
2010
Soldatino | Barizan | Alaivan
2009
Zaynar | Walkon | Mourad
2008
Celestial Halo | Franchoek | Won in the Dark
2007
Katchit | Liberate | Mobaasher
2006
Detroit City | Fair Along | Blazing Bailey
2005
Penzance | Faasel | Akilak
2004
Made in Japan | Chief Yeoman | Top Strategy
2003
Spectroscope | Well Chief | Golden Cross
2002
Scolardy | Newhall | Diamond Joshua

2000-1991
2000
Snow Drop | Regal Exit | General Cloney
1999
Katarino | Balla Sola | Afarad
1998
Upgrade | City Hall | Nomadic
1997
Commanche Court | Circus Star | Shooting Light
1996
Paddy's Return | Mistinguett | Hatta Breeze
1995
Kissair | Silver Wedge | Anzum
1994
Mysilv | Moorish | Shirley's Delight
1993
Shawiya | Amazon Express | Major Bugler
1992
Duke of Monmouth | Crowded House | Al Mutahm
1991
Oh So Risky | Chirkpar | Boarding School

1991-1988
1990
Rare Holiday | Ninja | Native Friend
1989
Ikdam | Highland Bud | Don Valentino
1988
Kribensis | Wahiba | Chatam

The Triumph Hurdle is a Grade 1 National Hunt hurdle race in Great Britain which is open to horses aged four years. It is run on the New Course at Cheltenham over a distance of about 2 miles and 1 furlong (2 miles and 179 yards, or 3,382 metres), and during its running there are eight hurdles to be jumped. The race is for juvenile novice hurdlers, and it is scheduled to take place each year during the Cheltenham Festival in March.

It is the leading event in the National Hunt calendar to be exclusively contested by juveniles, and it is the opening race on the final day of the Festival.

== History ==
The event was established in 1939, and it was originally held at Hurst Park in Surrey. During the early part of its history it was regularly contested by horses trained in France – six of the first seven winners were French-based. The flat racing jockey Lester Piggott achieved one of his twenty hurdle victories in this race in 1954.

Hurst Park closed in 1962 and the Triumph Hurdle was not run in 1963 or 1964. The race was transferred to Cheltenham in 1965, and for a period thereafter it was sponsored by the Daily Express. It was initially held during the venue's April meeting, but it became part of the Festival in 1968. The Elite Racing Club took over the sponsorship in 1997, and JCB became the sponsor in 2002.

Winners of the Triumph Hurdle often go on to compete in subsequent editions of the Champion Hurdle. Five horses have achieved victory in both events – Clair Soleil, Persian War, Kribensis, Katchit and Lossiemouth.

== Records ==
Leading jockey (5 wins):

- Barry Geraghty – Spectroscope (2003), Zaynar (2009), Soldatino (2010), Peace And Co (2015), Ivanovich Gorbatov (2016)

Leading trainer (7 wins):

- Nicky Henderson – First Bout (1985), Alone Success (1987), Katarino (1999), Zaynar (2009), Soldatino (2010), Peace And Co (2015), Pentland Hills (2019)
- Willie Mullins - Scolardy (2002), Burning Victory (2020), Vauban (2022), Lossiemouth (2023), Majborough (2024), Poniros (2025), Apolon De Charnie (2026)

== Winners ==
| Year | Winner | Jockey | Trainer |
|---|---|---|---|
| 1939 | Grey Talk | Serge Rochet | George Batchelor |
| | no race 1940–49 |
| 1950 | Abrupto | Roger Mantelin | E. Diggle |
| 1951 | Blue Song II | Fernand Thirion | Georges Pelat |
| 1952 | Hoggar | Roger Triboit | John Cunnington |
| 1953 | Clair Soleil | Fred Winter | François Mathet |
| 1954 | Prince Charlemagne | Lester Piggott | Tommy Carey |
| 1955 | Kwannin | Pierre Delfarguiel | Alec Head |
| 1956 | Square Dance | Michael Scudamore | Fulke Walwyn |
| 1957 | Meritorius | Denis Dillon | Peter Thrale |
| 1958 | Pundit | Harry Sprague | Staff Ingham |
| 1959 | Amazon's Choice | Johnny Gilbert | Peter Thrale |
| 1960 | Turpial | Arthur Freeman | Peter Cazalet |
| 1961 | Cantab | Fred Winter | Ryan Price |
| 1962 | Beaver II | Josh Gifford | Ryan Price |
| | no race 1963–64 |
| 1965 | Blarney Beacon | Geordie Ramshaw | Ron Smyth |
| 1966 | Black Ice | Bobby Beasley | Arthur Thomas |
| 1967 | Persian War | Jimmy Uttley | Brian Swift |
| 1968 | England's Glory | Jimmy Uttley | Staff Ingham |
| 1969 | Coral Diver | Terry Biddlecombe | Fred Rimell |
| 1970 | Varma | Brian Barker | Mick Masson |
| 1971 | Boxer | Jimmy Uttley | Ron Smyth |
| 1972 | Zarib | Bill Smith | Fred Rimell |
| 1973 | Moonlight Bay | Johnny Haine | Ryan Price |
| 1974 | Attivo | Robert Hughes | Cyril Mitchell |
| 1975 | Royal Epic | Fred McKenna | Vernon Cross |
| 1976 | Peterhof | Jonjo O'Neill | Mick Easterby |
| 1977 | Meladon | Tommy Carberry | Adrian Maxwell |
| 1978 | Connaught Ranger | John Burke | Fred Rimell |
| 1979 | Pollardstown | Philip Blacker | Stan Mellor |
| 1980 | Heighlin | Steve Jobar | David Elsworth |
| 1981 | Baron Blakeney | Paul Leach | Martin Pipe |
| 1982 | Shiny Copper | Allen Webb | Dina Smith |
| 1983 | Saxon Farm | Mark Perrett | Stan Mellor |
| 1984 | Northern Game | Tommy Ryan | Edward O'Grady |
| 1985 | First Bout | Steve Smith Eccles | Nicky Henderson |
| 1986 | Solar Cloud | Peter Scudamore | David Nicholson |
| 1987 | Alone Success | Steve Smith Eccles | Nicky Henderson |
| 1988 | Kribensis | Richard Dunwoody | Michael Stoute |
| 1989 | Ikdam | Nigel Coleman | Richard Holder |
| 1990 | Rare Holiday | Brendan Sheridan | Dermot Weld |
| 1991 | Oh So Risky | Paul Holley | David Elsworth |
| 1992 | Duke of Monmouth | Mark Richards | Simon Sherwood |
| 1993 | Shawiya | Charlie Swan | Michael O'Brien |
| 1994 | Mysilv | Adrian Maguire | David Nicholson |
| 1995 | Kissair | Jonothan Lower | Martin Pipe |
| 1996 | Paddy's Return | Richard Dunwoody | Ferdy Murphy |
| 1997 | Commanche Court | Norman Williamson | Ted Walsh |
| 1998 | Upgrade | Carl Llewellyn | Nigel Twiston-Davies |
| 1999 | Katarino | Mick Fitzgerald | Nicky Henderson |
| 2000 | Snow Drop | Thierry Doumen | François Doumen |
| 2001 | Abandoned due to a foot-and-mouth outbreak |
| 2002 | Scolardy | Charlie Swan | Willie Mullins |
| 2003 | Spectroscope | Barry Geraghty | Jonjo O'Neill |
| 2004 | Made in Japan | Richard Johnson | Philip Hobbs |
| 2005 | Penzance | Robert Thornton | Alan King |
| 2006 | Detroit City | Richard Johnson | Philip Hobbs |
| 2007 | Katchit | Robert Thornton | Alan King |
| 2008 | Celestial Halo | Ruby Walsh | Paul Nicholls |
| 2009 | Zaynar | Barry Geraghty | Nicky Henderson |
| 2010 | Soldatino | Barry Geraghty | Nicky Henderson |
| 2011 | Zarkandar | Daryl Jacob | Paul Nicholls |
| 2012 | Countrywide Flame | Dougie Costello | John Quinn |
| 2013 | Our Conor | Bryan Cooper | Dessie Hughes |
| 2014 | Tiger Roll | Davy Russell | Gordon Elliott |
| 2015 | Peace And Co | Barry Geraghty | Nicky Henderson |
| 2016 | Ivanovich Gorbatov | Barry Geraghty | Aidan O'Brien |
| 2017 | Defi du Seuil | Richard Johnson | Philip Hobbs |
| 2018 | Farclas | Jack Kennedy | Gordon Elliott |
| 2019 | Pentland Hills | Nico de Boinville | Nicky Henderson |
| 2020 | Burning Victory | Paul Townend | Willie Mullins |
| 2021 | Quilixios | Rachael Blackmore | Henry De Bromhead |
| 2022 | Vauban | Paul Townend | Willie Mullins |
| 2023 | Lossiemouth | Paul Townend | Willie Mullins |
| 2024 | Majborough | Mark Walsh | Willie Mullins |
| 2025 | Poniros | Jonjo O'Neill jnr | Willie Mullins |
| 2026 | Apolon De Charnie | Patrick Mullins (Note: amateur jockey) | Willie Mullins |

== See also ==
- Horse racing in Great Britain
- List of British National Hunt races
