= Paddy Broderick =

Irish national hunt jockey (1939–2020)

Patrick Joseph Broderick (1 September 1939 – 8 February 2020) was an Irish National Hunt jockey. Known as Paddy Broderick, he was the jockey on board Night Nurse who won two Champion Hurdle races in 1976 and 1977.

== Biography ==
Beginning his life on the Flat in County Westmeath, Ireland, Broderick was born on 1 September 1939, the day the Second World War began. In June 1954, at the age of 14, he won on his debut ride, the Pipe Band, at Navan. He was an apprentice under Cyril Bryce-Smith.

After Broderick moved from Ireland to Britain, he began riding for northern trainer Arthur Stephenson, The Thinker's Cheltenham Gold Cup-winning trainer, and it was he who advised Broderick to adopt the long-reined policeman-style of riding. Along the line, he was said to have met his wife, Nan, in Britain. The trainer and jockey had a fruitful partnership yielding many winners including the Welsh Grand National on Rainbow Battle in 1964 and the Mackeson Gold Cup on Pawnbroker in 1964.

Broderick rode 459 winners in 17 seasons in Britain but in an interview in 2001, he said that by far the best horse he ever sat on was Night Nurse.

At the 1977 Boxing Day meeting at Kempton Park, Night Nurse parted company with Broderick at the last fence with victory a certainty gifting Beacon Light the race, Sadly, the injury Broderick received from the crashing fall, resulted in his retirement from the sport.

== Night nurse total wins ==
The initial eighteen victories for Night Nurse in hurdle races, which also included victories in the Free Handicap Hurdle, Fighting Fifth Hurdle, Sweeps Hurdle, Scottish Champion Hurdle, Welsh Champion Hurdle, John Skeaping Hurdle, 1977 Templegate Hurdle (dead-heat), and Welsh Champion Hurdle in 1975.

== Legacies ==
1964: Welsh Grand National - Rainbow Battle.

1966: Mackeson Gold Cup - Pawnbroker .

1975: Fighting Fifth Hurdle - Night Nurse.

1976: Scottish Champion Hurdle - Night Nurse.

1976: Champion Hurdle - Night Nurse.

1977: Champion Hurdle - Night Nurse.

He's said to have the 6th position in the jump jockey's table. He has 50 wins between the period of 1966-1967.

== Death ==
Retired jump jockey Paddy Broderick, a highly respected and accomplished figure in the world of horse racing, died on 3 February 2020, at the age of 80. Broderick, known for his skill, courage, and dedication, had a distinguished career as a National Hunt jockey.
