= Night Nurse (horse) =

British-bred Thoroughbred racehorse

- Sire: Falcon
- Grandsire: Milesian
- Dam: Florence Nightingale
- Damsire: Above Suspicion
- Sex: Gelding
- Foaled: 1971
- Country: Ireland
- Colour: Bay
- Breeder: Eleanor Samuelson
- Owner: Reg Spencer
- Trainer: Peter Easterby
- Record: 35 wins, 3 flat, 19 hurdles, 13 chases
- Earnings: £174,507

Major wins
- Fighting Fifth Hurdle (1975); Irish Sweeps Hurdle (1975); Champion Hurdle (1976, 1977); Scottish Champion Hurdle (1976); Welsh Champion Hurdle (1976, 1977); Templegate Hurdle (dead heat)(1977); William Hill Hurdle; Free Handicap Hurdle; Sean Graham Trophy Chase (1979); Black & White Whisky Gold Cup Chase (1979); Mandarin Handicap Chase (1982); Pennine Chase (1982); Red Alligator Chase (1980); London & Northern Group Chmp. Nov. Chase (1979)

Awards
- Timeform rating: 182 (hurdle) (highest ever given for a hurdler)
- Last updated on 19 December 2009

Night Nurse (26 May 1971 – 1998) was an Irish-bred English-trained National Hunt racehorse. Night Nurse garnered 35 wins, winning a total of £174,507 viz. He won 3 races on the flat at 3 and 4-years old and placed 3 times; he also won 32 National Hunt races, 19 wins over hurdles and 13 wins in steeplechases from 64 starts. He was awarded the highest Timeform rating ever given to a hurdler and has been acclaimed amongst the greatest ever hurdlers.

== Background ==
Night Nurse was a bay gelding bred at the Cloghran Stud in Ireland by Eleanor Samuelson, the daughter of Dick Dawson. He was sired by Falcon out of Samuelson's mare Florence Nightingale. At the Newmarket Houghton sale in 1972 Night Nurse was sold for 1,300 guineas to the trainer Peter Easterby. During his racing career he was owned by Reg Spencer and trained by Easterby at his stables at Habton Grange near Malton, North Yorkshire. Night Nurse was ridden in many of his early races by the Irishman Paddy Broderick, who used a long-rein style.

== Racing career ==
=== Flat racing ===
Night Nurse failed to win in six races as a two-year-old in 1973 and won once, in a maiden race at Ripon Racecourse, from six attempts in the following year. He won two of his three races in 1975 and finished second in his only flat race of 1976.

=== Hurdle racing ===
He won 10 consecutive hurdle races from 1975 to 1976 which included an undefeated season where he won the Welsh, English and Scottish Champion hurdles.

Night Nurse's second victory in the Champion Hurdle has been described as one of the highest-quality hurdle races ever contested.[1] His stablemate, Sea Pigeon, trained by Peter Easterby and a future dual Champion Hurdle winner, finished fourth, while Monksfield finished second, two lengths behind Night Nurse. A mistake at the final hurdle contributed to Monksfield's defeat.[1] The pair met again shortly afterward in the Templegate Hurdle at Aintree, where they finished in a dead heat that has been described as one of jump racing's most famous.[1]

=== Steeplechasing ===
Night Nurse was successfully switched to chasing and was several times fancied to win the Cheltenham Gold Cup, but the closest he came was second to Little Owl in 1981.

== Assessment ==
Timeform rated Night Nurse at 182, the highest rating ever awarded to a hurdler.

== Pedigree ==
Pedigree of Night Nurse (IRE), bay gelding 1971
Sire Falcon (GB) 1964	Milesian (IRE); 1953	My Babu	Djebel
Sire Falcon (GB) 1964	Milesian (IRE); 1953	My Babu	Perfume
Sire Falcon (GB) 1964	Milesian (IRE); 1953	Oatflake	Coup de Lyon
Sire Falcon (GB) 1964	Milesian (IRE); 1953	Oatflake	Avena
Sire Falcon (GB) 1964	Pretty Swift (GB); 1959	Petition	Fair Trial
Sire Falcon (GB) 1964	Pretty Swift (GB); 1959	Petition	Art Paper
Sire Falcon (GB) 1964	Pretty Swift (GB); 1959	Fragilite	Prince Bio
Sire Falcon (GB) 1964	Pretty Swift (GB); 1959	Fragilite	Fanchonnette
Dam Florence Nightingale (GB) 1962	Above Suspicion (GB); 1956	Court Martial	Fair Trial
Dam Florence Nightingale (GB) 1962	Above Suspicion (GB); 1956	Court Martial	Instantaneous
Dam Florence Nightingale (GB) 1962	Above Suspicion (GB); 1956	Above Board	Straight Deal
Dam Florence Nightingale (GB) 1962	Above Suspicion (GB); 1956	Above Board	Feola
Dam Florence Nightingale (GB) 1962	Panacea (FR); 1947	Galene	Blue Skies
Dam Florence Nightingale (GB) 1962	Panacea (FR); 1947	Galene	Static
Dam Florence Nightingale (GB) 1962	Panacea (FR); 1947	Toute Vite	Vatout
Dam Florence Nightingale (GB) 1962	Panacea (FR); 1947	Toute Vite	Hurry Off (Family: 3-e)

- Night Nurse was inbred 4 × 4 to Fair Trial, meaning that this stallion appears twice in the fourth generation of his pedigree.
