= Peter Easterby =

British racehorse trainer (1929–2025)

Miles Henry Easterby (5 August 1929 – 9 June 2025), known as Peter Easterby, was a British racehorse trainer. He was British jump racing Champion Trainer three times.

== Life and career ==
From starting with seven horses at his stables at Habton Grange near Malton, North Yorkshire in 1950, he became one of the most successful trainers in British racing by the time he retired in February 1996. He is the only trainer to have saddled over 1,000 winners in Britain in both flat and National Hunt racing.

He was Champion trainer in the 1978–79, 1979–80 and 1980–81 seasons and amongst the horses he trained were Saucy Kit, winner of the Champion Hurdle in 1967; Alverton, winner of the Cheltenham Gold Cup in 1979, who was killed in a fall when favourite for the 1979 Grand National; and Little Owl, winner of the Cheltenham Gold Cup in 1981.

In the late 1970s and early 1980s Easterby's stable housed two of the leading horses in British National Hunt racing. Sea Pigeon won the Champion Hurdle in 1980 and 1981 and was also the winner of the Ebor Handicap and Chester Cup (twice) in flat racing. Night Nurse was the Champion Hurdle winner in 1976 and 1977 and became a leading steeplechaser. He finished second to his stable-companion Little Owl in the 1981 Cheltenham Gold Cup, just failing to become the first horse to complete the Champion Hurdle-Cheltenham Gold Cup double. His Timeform rating of 182 is the highest ever given to a hurdler.

On his retirement, Easterby was succeeded as trainer at Habton Grange by his son, Tim Easterby, who trained Bollin Eric to win the St. Leger in 2002.

Easterby's brother, M. W. (Mick) Easterby, is still an active racehorse trainer, and his cousin Henry is the father of Irish rugby union internationals Simon and Guy Easterby.

In July 2009, Easterby was convicted of an offence under the Hunting Act 2004 after allowing his land to be used for a hare coursing event.Horse trainer and retired army major guilty of hare-coursing

== Death ==
Easterby died on 9 June 2025, at the age of 95.

== Sources ==
- Tim Easterby's website
- Peter Easterby, legendary dual-purpose trainer and founder of Yorkshire dynasty, dies aged 95, Racing Post, 9 June 2025
