= Paul Kelleway =

British jockey and trainer

Personal information
- Born: 31 August 1940 London
- Died: 21 April 1999 (aged 58)
- Occupations: Jockey and trainer

Horse racing career
- Sport: Horse racing

Significant horses
- What A Myth; Bula; Crisp; Barona; Swiss Maid; African Song; Madame Gay; Risk Me

Paul Kelleway (31 August 1940 – 21 April 1999) was a National Hunt jockey who became a trainer of horses on the flat. As a jockey, he won the 1969 Cheltenham Gold Cup and, as a trainer, saddled a number of Group 1 winners.

Kelleway was born in London. He was evacuated on account of World War II to Yorkshire, which became his adopted county. He was apprenticed to Doncaster trainer Eddie Magner, moving to the yard of Harry Wragg in Newmarket after a year. He rode his first winner, Golovine, trained by Wragg, at Haydock in 1955. Becoming too heavy for flat racing, he joined the yard of dual-purpose trainer Ryan Price in Findon, West Sussex.

During his career as a National Hunt jockey, from 1958 to 1977, Kelleway rode 392 winners. In 1966 he won the Whitbread Gold Cup on What A Myth, trained by Ryan. Three years later he rode What A Myth to victory in the Cheltenham Gold Cup. Kelleway went on to ride as number one jockey to trainer Fred Winter at Upland Stables in Lambourn. Amongst the horses he rode for Winter were Bula, winner of the Champion Hurdle in 1971 and 1972, and Crisp, winner of the 1971 Queen Mother Champion Chase. Barona, trained by Roddy Armytage, provided Kelleway with back-to-back wins in the 1975 and 1976 Scottish Grand National and fourth place in the 1976 Aintree Grand National. In 1975, he was unseated from Barona at Becher's Brook in the Grand National when fellow jockey Andy Turnell grabbed his arm while falling from his own mount.

After his retirement as a jockey in 1977, Kelleway set up as a trainer of horses on the flat with his wife Gillian at Shalfleet Stables on the Bury Road in Newmarket. He soon achieved success at the highest level when Swiss Maid won the Champion Stakes at Ascot in October 1978. African Song gave him a first Royal Ascot win in 1980, when he won the King's Stand Stakes. He had a total of six Royal Ascot winners as a trainer. His daughter Gay Kelleway rode one of them, Sprowston Boy in the 1987 Queen Alexandra Stakes, to become the first woman to ride a winner at the Royal Ascot. Kelleway had a reputation for achieving success with horses bought cheaply as yearlings. Madame Gay, winner of the 1981 Prix de Diane and runner-up in the 1981 Oaks, was bought for 8,000 guineas and sold for $1.4 million, while Risk Me, winner of the 1987 Prix Jean Prat and Grand Prix de Paris was bought for £20,000 and sold to stud for £1.4 million, having won £300,000 in prize money. Although concentrating on runners on the flat, Kelleway also trained National Hunt horses, with Asir winning the Sun Alliance Hurdle at the Cheltenham Festival in 1987.

Kelleway retired from training in 1997. He died in Cheam on 21 April 1999.
