= Faugheen =

Racehorse trained in Ireland

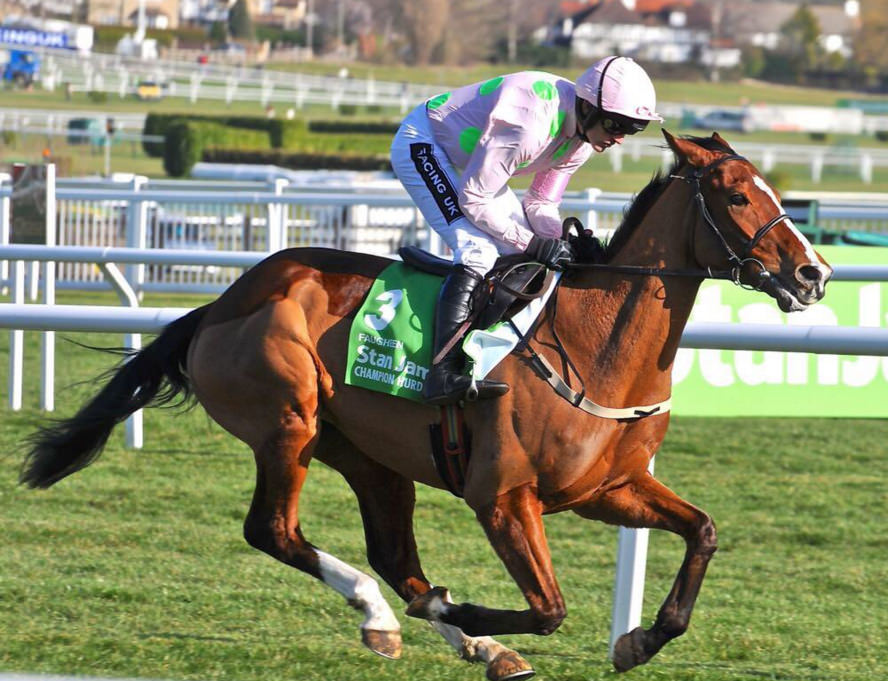
- Faugheen winning the 2015 Champion Hurdle
- Sire: Germany
- Grandsire: Trempolino
- Dam: Miss Pickering
- Damsire: Accordion
- Sex: Gelding
- Foaled: 2 May 2008
- Country: Ireland
- Colour: Bay
- Breeder: John Waldron
- Owner: Susannah Ricci
- Trainer: Willie Mullins
- Record: 26: 17-3-1; 4:3-0-1 (Steeplechase); 21:13-3-1 (Hurdles); 1:1-0-0 (Bumpers); 1:1-0-0 (PTP)
- Earnings: £1,116,679

Major wins
- Dorans Pride Novice Hurdle (2013); Baring Bingham Novices' Hurdle (2014); Herald Champion Novice Hurdle (2014); Ascot Hurdle (2014); Christmas Hurdle (2014, 2015); Champion Hurdle (2015); Punchestown Champion Hurdle (2015); Irish Champion Hurdle (2016); Morgiana Hurdle (2017); Champion Stayers Hurdle (2018); Greenmount Park Novice Chase (2019); Flogas Novice Chase (2020)

Awards
- Irish Horse of the Year (2015)

Honours
- Faugheen Novice Chase at Limerick Racecourse

Faugheen (foaled 2 May 2008) is an Irish Thoroughbred racehorse best known for winning the 2015 Champion Hurdle and back-to-back Christmas Hurdles in 2014 and 2015. His best performance on a racecourse came in the 2016 Irish Champion Hurdle for which he was rated the best two-mile hurdler of the 21st century. His career started over Point-to-point fences as a four-year-old and was sent racing under National Hunt rules in the 2013/2014 season where he emerged as a leading Novice hurdler, winning all of his races including the Dorans Pride Novice Hurdle, Cheltenham Novices Hurdle and Herald Champion Novice Hurdle acquiring the nickname "The Machine" in the process.

Faugheen continued his undefeated run in the next season out of Novices company when he was kept over hurdles, winning his first three races in Britain with victories at Ascot and a month later in the Christmas Hurdle, followed with a win at the highest level in the Champion Hurdle, defeating a strong field that included two previous champions. He finished the 2014/2015 National Hunt campaign with a perfect record by taking the Punchestown Champion Hurdle and was marked by the Anglo-Irish and Timeform handicappers as the highest rated hurdler in training.

Faugheen faced the first defeat of his career on his seasonal reappearance in the 2015/2016 National Hunt campaign but bounced back with victories in the Grade 1 Christmas Hurdle by 7 lengths in December 2015 and in the next month he took the Irish Champion Hurdle by 15 lengths, the widest winning margin in the race's history. Shortly thereafter he suffered a small injury when resuming training for the Cheltenham Festival and missed the rest of the season. Further injuries kept him out for the 2016/2017 season, and he returned to the racecourse in November 2017 with victory in the Morgiana Hurdle. A lacklustre performance saw him pulled up in the December Festival Hurdle at Leopardstown. He was beaten into second place in the Irish Champion Hurdle and there was a disappointing performance in the Champion Hurdle at Cheltenham before his final race of the 2017/2018 season saw a return to form with victory in the Champion Stayers Hurdle at Punchestown.

The 2018/2019 season was Faugheen's first season on the racecourse without a win. He came second in the Morgiana Hurdle and experienced the first fall of his career in the Christmas Hurdle. At the Cheltenham Festival he was placed third in the Stayers' Hurdle and at Aintree was pulled up in the Aintree Hurdle. In October 2019 trainer Willie Mullins announced that the 11 year old would start a novice chasing campaign. Faugheen made his debut over fences with a win in a Beginners Chase at Punchestown in November 2019 and followed it up on 26 December at Limerick with victory in the Grade 1 Greenmount Park Novice Chase. Another win at the Dublin Racing Festival in February 2020 took Faugheen's record to 17 wins in 25 races, with eleven Grade One wins. He came third in the Marsh Novices' Chase at the 2020 Cheltenham Festival, in what was to be his last appearance in a race. His retirement was announced in May 2021 and he joined the living legends at the Irish National Stud.

== Background ==
Faugheen is a bay gelding with a white blaze and white socks on his hind legs bred in Ireland by Dr John Waldron. He was sired by Germany, an American-bred, German-trained horse who won the Grosser Preis von Baden and the Bayerisches Zuchtrennen in 1995. As a breeding stallion he sired several good National Hunt horses including Captain Cee Bee whose win have included the Supreme Novices' Hurdle and the Ryanair Novice Chase.

Faugheen's dam Miss Pickering was an unraced daughter of the leading National Hunt sire Accordion and a descendant of the broodmare Meraline, making her a distant relative of the Prix de l'Arc de Triomphe winner Saumarez. Faugheen is the only winner she has produced to date and hails from the family of the 1973 Group Three Premio Royal Mares winner Ombra Del Sol, herself the dam of the 1981 Old Newton Cup winner Dogberry, and the seven furlong Listed winning pair Borderline and Sapper.

In 2008 as a foal, he was consigned to the Tattersalls Ireland Sale and bought for €4000 by Peter Quinlan. In June 2011, his brother Tom Quinlan sent the three-year-old gelding to the Goffs National Hunt sale and he was bought for €12,000 by Meadowview Stables. He ran his first race in a point-to-point circuit in the colours of Thomas Hassett, who named him after a church near the Bohernamuck crossroads in County Waterford called Faugheen Chapel. After impressing on his debut Faugheen moved on to Rich and Susannah Ricci ownership in the summer of 2012 and was sent into training for Willie Mullins yard.

== Racing career ==
=== Early career ===
Faugheen under rules silks

Faugheen was trained by Andrew Slattery when he began his racing career on the amateur Point-to-point circuit. At the Ballysteen meeting on 29 April 2012 he started 2/1 second favourite for a three-mile maiden race and won by eight lengths from Ballingarrow. Afterwards Andrew Slattery reported that "this is a real good horse who is still very backward, he is only eighty percent fit, but his homework has been very good".

Later that year Faugheen entered Mrs S Ricci ownership and was sent into training with Willie Mullins at which he "was held in high regard". Faugheen was subsequently the subject of support for the 2013 Champion Bumper without setting foot on a racecourse with the yard connections reporting that he won impressively a schooling bumper but after an absence of over a year due to injury the gelding returned on 11 May 2013 in a twenty-two runner National Hunt Flat race at Punchestown Racecourse. Ridden by his trainer's son Patrick Mullins, he started 11/8 favourite and accelerated clear of his opponents in the last quarter mile to win by twenty-two lengths from Josses Hill.

=== 2013/2014 National Hunt season: Novice hurdles ===
In the 2013/2014 National Hunt season Faugheen was campaigned in novice hurdle races. He made his jumping debut on 17 November, ridden by Ruby Walsh, he started the 1/5 short favourite for a race over two miles and six furlongs at Punchestown. After keeping tabs on the leaders throughout the race Faugheen was still on the bridle as he coasted clear in the home straight. The only danger appeared to be at the last obstacle at which he took an untidy jump but was still well on top off the out of depth adversaries without Walsh asking for any serious effort out of his mount.

Three weeks later he was entered for the Meath Novice Hurdle over two and a half miles at Navan Racecourse. Ruby Walsh beforehand said that Faugheen "absolutely bolted up at Punchestown on his first run of this season and the third, Oscar Chimes, won since in Thurles, so the form doesn’t look too bad" and reported that he had "worked really well during the week and is, without doubt, the reason I’m staying at home." He was again sent off at prohibitive odds but confirmed the expectations winning by four and a quarter lengths from Empire of Dirt. After the race Walsh said "He jumped better today but there is still room for improvement. He'll keep learning and the only way he'll do that is through racing so that's why Willie wanted to come here first before going for a graded race. He deserves his chance in the big time".

On 28 December Faugheen was moved up in class for the Dorans Pride Novice Hurdle graded event over three miles on heavy ground at Limerick Racecourse. By this time, the previously beaten horses started to frank the form, leading with the bumper 22 lengths runner-up Josses Hill who was purchased for £100,000 and subsequently won his next 2 races, therefore the raise in class proved of little concern and Faugheen "maintained his unbeaten record in effortless fashion when taking the Novice Hurdle at Limerick". Ridden by Emmet Mullins, the nephew of Faugheen's trainer, he led from the start and won by five lengths from The Job Is Right despite jumping poorly at several of the obstacles.

==== Cheltenham Novices' Hurdle ====
At his first Cheltenham Festival appearance Faugheen contested the Baring Bingham Novices' Hurdle – his first race at Grade 1 level – over two miles and five furlongs where he started as the 6/4 favourite against fourteen rivals headed by Red Sherlock and Rathvinden, the first and second-place finishers in the Classic Novices' Hurdle.

"'Faugheen The Machine' duly backed up."

— Sportinglife

Ruby Walsh tracked the front-runner Cole Harden before taking the lead at the third last at which he blundered but managed to stay upfront putting in another awkward jump at the second last hurdle while horses from off the pace were starting to make their presence felt in behind. At the turn Walsh asked his mount for the final effort and Faugheen responded by steering away from his rivals and finishing four and a half lengths at the line ahead of Ballyalton and Rathvinden who were both kept off the pace throughout the race.

The overall time of 4m 54.80s was the second fastest in the history of the race and both Faugheen with the front-runner Cole Harden who helped in achieving it, returned the next year at the Cheltenham Festival with victories in the Champion Hurdle and World Hurdle. After this race the already popular nickname "Faugheen The Machine" started to officially get used in news articles and in live commentaries e.g. Channel 4 commentator on Boxing Day.

==== Herald Champion Novice Hurdle ====
Faugheen's final appearance of the season was on 29 April and started the 1/2 favourite when dropped down in distance for the Grade 1 Herald Champion Novice Hurdle over two miles at the Punchestown Festival. Unlike Cheltenham, this time around he had to make his own fractions and set a decent gallop upfront. Just before the home turn Ruby Walsh asked him to extend the lead and the response was instant, pulling clear of the pack in the home straight. Walsh was back on the bridle after jumping the last and started to pat him in the last 100 yards still finishing twelve lengths in front of his stablemate Valseur Lido. According to the Racing Post he was an "incredibly easy winner... pulverising his rivals with an emphatic display of acceleration". Timeform also cemented that view in their race analysis:

Faugheen is of the type who don't come around very often, adding another string to his already loaded bow as he had no problem at all dropping to 2m, demolishing a field of very useful rivals with a performance that had to be seen to be believed...

After the race, Ruby Walsh said: "I was fairly adamant that the run at Cheltenham would improve him jumping-wise and that proved to be as he jumped like a buck today. I think Willie is keen to go jumping fences with him but he's in the mix now [for the Champion Hurdle] – it will have Willie scratching his head". Willie Mullins confirmed later that day: "he´ll stay hurdling next season. He´s a keen horse and likes to get on with the job so he could well stay at this trip." earning him Paddy Power quotes of 5/1 co-favourite with The New One and stablemate Vautour for the 2015 Champion Hurdle.

=== 2014/2015 National Hunt season ===
==== Ascot Hurdle ====
On his first appearance against more experienced hurdlers, Faugheen contested the Ascot Hurdle over 2m 3 1/2 f on 22 November 2014. As in most of his previous races, he took the lead from the start and was never seriously challenged, winning by three and three-quarter lengths from the Nicky Henderson-trained Blue Fashion. Mullins later said: "Dan Skelton, who stood in for me on the day, remarked to Ruby (Walsh) that he'd never saddled a horse as fat as that for a big race. If he can do that with that amount of condition on him there must be huge improvement in him". After the race the William Hill made Faugheen 9/4 favourite for the 2015 Champion Hurdle.

==== Christmas Hurdle (1) ====
Faugheen's next start was the Grade 1 Christmas Hurdle on Boxing Day over two miles at Kempton in which he started at 4/11 short price favourite with his main opposition looking to come from the Fighting Fifth Hurdle winner Irving. He tracked the front-running Blue Heron before taking the lead approaching the second last hurdle and drew away in the straight to win by eight lengths from Purple Bay, the winner of the Elite Hurdle who was officially rated the second best horse coming into the race.

The performance's style was backed by substance recording the fastest overall time in this race over the Good-Soft going which caused his odds to shorten again in the Champion Hurdle market at a general price of 5/4, the shortest priced horse in history at the first attempt of winning the Champion Hurdle without previously encountering any of his main rivals, with the prolific 3 times winners Hatton's Grace, Sir Ken and Istabraq sent off at 100–7 in 1949, 3/1 in 1952 and respectively 3/1 in 1998, while the other 3 times winners of the Champion Hurdle Persian War and See You Then weren't sent off as favourites on their first attempts. 2 times winners Bula, Night Nurse and Hurricane Fly started at 15/8, 2/1 and 11/4 at their first attempts, respectively in 1971, 1976 and 2011.

Faugheen's groom, John Codd, who was taking care and rode him every day at Willie Mullins yard, commented about the task lying ahead in the Champion Hurdle "Faugheen's got plenty of good horses to beat but he's done nothing wrong and nothing's beaten him yet" and reported that Faugheen "started to pick up work about three weeks before the Festival. He gives you a great feeling to ride. I used to ride Big Zeb and he's a very similar type."

==== Champion Hurdle (1) ====
On 10 March 2015, Faugheen was bidding to become the Champion hurdler after being the Novice Champion of the previous season. His reputation and unbeaten record scared most of the opposition away but a strong field of seven opponents remained in the race marking it the smallest field of the Champion Hurdle since double champion Night Nurse won his first crown in 1976, almost 40 years back. The rivals were headed by the best British hurdler The New One who was unbeaten since the 2014 Champion Hurdle, dual Champion Hurricane Fly who was unbeaten in the current season and current Champion Jezki.

"It was a massive call not to ride Hurricane Fly."

— Ruby Walsh

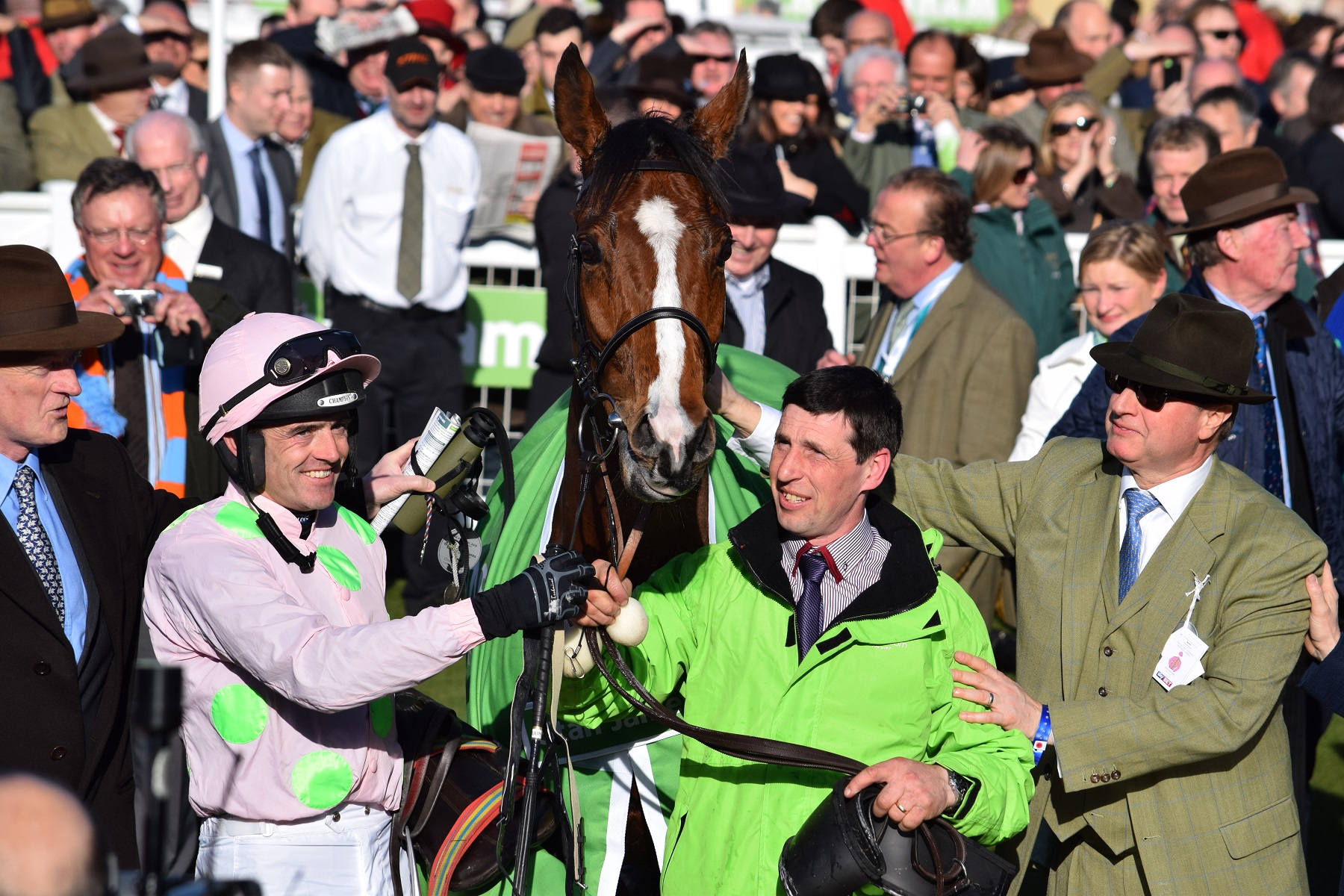
2015 Cheltenham winner's enclosure (left to right): trainer Willie Mullins, jockey Ruby Walsh, Faugheen, groom John Codd, owner Rich Ricci

Ruby Walsh kept the decision to ride Faugheen as late as the declarations stage on Sunday before the opening day and compared it to the tough decision of choosing between Kauto Star and Denman: "It was a massive call not to ride Hurricane Fly. When you see what Hurricane Fly was doing at home, it was a big call to get off him".

Faugheen was sent off as the 4/5 favourite after opening at 11/10 in the morning with late support coming once Willie Mullins took the first two G1 races on the card. Faugheen was again forced into the role of front runner but was allowed to set a moderate pace in the early stages of the race.

After making some clumsy errors at a couple of hurdles he started to pick up the speed in the back straight with his jumping improving considerably at a faster pace until 2 out at which he blundered allowing Jezki and The New One to gain advantage on the outside, Ruby Walsh reporting: "When Jezki and The New One came up beside me, they didn’t go by me. He was straight back on to it, and away with him. He's just a very, very good horse, with a mighty engine."

Coming into the home straight Faugheen found the extra gear and pulled clear of his rivals never looking in danger with his stablemate third-string Arctic Fire the closest finisher and flattered by the margin at the line after being kept off the pace throughout the race: "He was a length and a half behind, but Walsh felt his mount was idling having been in front for so long". Faugheen became the first Champion Hurdle winner that had previously won a graded race over 3 miles and also the first Point-to-point winner that went on to win the crown.

Willie Mullins commented: →″We looked at the race and we thought no-one probably wanted to make it, and Ruby just thought it might be the thing to do. I was happy once he was happy to do it. I wasn't concerned at any stage, I thought he was well in control all the time″ →″Faugheen was just awesome today and we know he's still improving″.

==== Punchestown Champion Hurdle ====
In his last race of the 2014/2015 campaign, Faugheen competed in the Punchestown Champion Hurdle against the smallest field he ever encountered with only 3 rivals opposing him. The former Champion Hudlers Hurricane Fly and Jezki were routed to the staying division after failing to make an impression against Faugheen last time out at Cheltenham, while the runner-up that day Arctic Fire was the only credible danger in this race. Faugheen once again had to make his own pace upfront but unlike Cheltenham where Ruby Walsh made it a tactical affair, this time around he applied a much faster pace early on which left Arctic Fire no hiding place and finished 8 lengths behind Faugheen who was still on the bridle at the business end. Ruby Walsh described Faugheen as "my idea of perfection" and upped his career record at 11 wins from 11 starts(10 under rules).

=== Midway career ===
Trainer Willie Mullins was gearing Faugheen towards a future chasing career during his novice season "I would imagine he's a chaser. He wants fences to maybe make him drop the bridle and travel" and having his first career win in a PTP race which uses similar fences to those used for chase races, the transition was expected to be beneficial by Mullins who provided an explanation after his win in the Grade 1 Cheltenham Novices' Hurdle where he made a few jumping errors: "I think he wants fences. He has a disregard for hurdles, he just wants to go. Fences might make him respect things more".

However, Faugheen's career took a major turn as just before the start of the Punchestown festival in late April 2014, his stablemate Vautour "failed a late fitness test" according to Mullins, that made them switch targets during that week with Faugheen running instead in the early Tuesday's race Herald Champion Novice Hurdle which was over the 2 miles trip. In the race he was against a couple of Vautour's former rivals of which Faugheen "made light work" and made Mullins to reconsider his future prospect: "You'd have to consider staying hurdling with him next season. Looking at him beforehand, I thought he was a chaser, but there's no harm in having another good hurdler and that would certainly make you think that maybe he should stay at this game".

After winning the 2015 Champion Hurdle, Willie Mullins said: "There's no reason to go novice chasing when you have a hurdler as good as this" and later confirmed that Faugheen "won’t jump a fence for a long time, perhaps ever". In mid-October 2015 in an exclusive interview on At the Races owner Rich Ricci revealed that "Faugheen looks like a chaser, we all know that, but he has a sensitive back and was hard to keep fit as a younger horse, hurdling probably is the right way for him".

=== 2015/2016 National Hunt season ===
==== Defeat on reappearance ====
Faugheen made his return on 15 November 2015 in the Morgiana Hurdle and while the general racing public expected a clean sweep by the champion hurdler who was sent off as the 1/6 favourite, instead a "shock defeat" left even his trainer Willie Mullins surprised when Faugheen's stablemate Nichols Canyon, a two-times Listed flat winner in 2013 and four-time Grade 1 winner in his 2014/2015 novice season, took the lead and remained in the first spot for the rest of the contest. During the race, the tactical slow gallop set by jockey David Mullins did not help Faugheen's jumping as he awkwardly skipped over the third obstacle and a significant error at the second last hurdle put another two lengths between himself and his stablemate.

"Faugheen's 11-race unbeaten run ended"

— BBC

Sprinting for home the three Mullins-trained horses were all in contention, including Wicklow Brave who on his previous three starts finished third in the G1 Irish St. Leger and G2 British Champions Long Distance Cup, placed second in the Ebor, Europe's most valuable flat handicap and was an eight lengths winner at the Cheltenham Festival in the 2015 County Hurdle. When Faugheen was asked to go past his stable companion he couldn't, Ruby Walsh reporting: "from the first down the back he was hanging right all the way, it's not something he's done before". After the last hurdle Faugheen started to make progress and was reducing the gap but the finish line came in time for Nichols Canyon, half a length in front of Faugheen whose 11-race unbeaten run came to an end.

The surprising result made Willie Mullins question if the gallops Faugheen did few days earlier at Curragh might have been the reason behind his defeat "That worked out completely different from the way they worked on Tuesday. Faugheen left Nichols for dead – maybe he left his race behind, I don’t know". Furthermore, while Ruby Walsh's prediction a month earlier: "Faugheen's unbeaten over timber but somewhere along the way that may go" came true on his reappearance, the jockey found the actual defeat discouraging: "It's disappointing, he didn’t pick up like he can, but that's horse racing isn’t it? We always knew Nichols Canyon was a good horse. It's just disappointing".

On 7 December at the Horse Racing Ireland annual awards, Faugheen was jointly awarded the title of Horse of the Year after tying in the vote with Don Cossack. The other Irish contenders for the award were Gleneagles – winner of the English and Irish 2000 Guineas, Legatissimo – 1000 Guineas winner, Nichols Canyon – a top novice hurdler, winner of five Grade 1 hurdles and Un de Sceaux – easy winner of the Arkle Trophy Chase. Trainer Willie Mullins was present at the ceremony along with Rich Ricci who received the award on behalf of his wife Susannah, who owns Faugheen.

==== Christmas Hurdle (2) ====
On Boxing Day Faugheen returned to winning ways in the Christmas Hurdle after his first run of the season where a hard prep work with only few days prior of Morgiana Hurdle and the waiting tactics behind a sedate pace, later emerged as causes for the defeat with Willie Mullins claiming that Faugheen "gallop before Punchestown was spectacular so I won't let him do that again". He became the fifth horse since 1969 to win back-to-back renewals of the Christmas Hurdle and faced four adversaries that included the best British hurdler The New One and Old Guard who was looking for a fourth consecutive victory after taking the Greatwood Hurdle and Bula Hurdle in his previous starts. Faugheen led all the way and approaching the last hurdle he pulled clear of the rest and won by seven lengths without being extended by Ruby Walsh who was relieved of the outcome: "Yes, that was old Faugheen. I caught hold of him going to the second last, he pinged it and then he quickened really, really well."

==== Irish Champion Hurdle (1) ====
A month later on 24 January 2016, Faugheen made his debut at the Leopardstown Racecourse and it was for the first time in his three racing seasons when he run in the same calendar year prior to the Cheltenham Festival in which he was favourite for the Cheltenham Champion Hurdle with the main two dangers in the betting, Arctic Fire and Nichols Canyon also taking him on in this race. Arctic Fire was the 2015 Champion Hurdle runner-up and was considered by the official handicappers the main danger while Nichols Canyon was the only horse to have finished ahead of Faugheen in all of his 13 starts to date and was coming into the race on back of a victory in the Grade 1 December Festival Hurdle. The outsiders of the race were Plinth at 100/1 — Grade 2 Istabraq Hurdle winner at the start of the season trained by Aidan O'Brien and King Of The Picts at 150/1 — a previous season Grade 3 winner over hurdles who reversed back to the smaller obstacles after little success in his previous starts over fences.

The possible tactics prior to the race provided an ongoing discussion among racing fans, as both Nichols Canyon and Faugheen in their careers were keen to get in the lead but Ruby Walsh later explained: "I viewed it that if Willie Mullins wasn't training Arctic Fire or Nichols Canyon, what would I do? That's the way I rode the race". Faugheen went in front approaching the first hurdle but Nichols Canyon came alongside him and forced a strong pace right from the start and the two were closely followed by Arctic Fire. At the third-last hurdle the fight for the lead upfront was beginning to take the toll on the two outsiders who were starting to be left behind. After two more furlongs Nichols Canyon showed the first signs of getting tired following Faugheen's strong gallop and jumped the second last hurdle markedly to his right with jockey Paul Townend pushing along whilst Arctic Fire passed him. Faugheen moved on by four lengths and extended to ten at the last hurdle, at which he showed his characteristic disregard for the small obstacles making a blunder out of it, landing awkwardly but without losing his momentum and being eased off by Ruby Walsh in the last 100 yards, still finishing 15 lengths clear of the runner-up Arctic Fire with a further 13 lengths back to Nichols Canyon.

This marked the longest winning margin in Faugheen's career since his 22 lengths bumper romp and was only his third Grade 1 success in Ireland, with the other four all in Britain. The performance, described as "electrifying" by Willie Mullins and "mind-boggling" by Des McDonogh — trainer of the Champion Hurdle dual winner Monksfield, was enough for Faugheen's Cheltenham Champion Hurdle odds to shorten even further to as low as 1/4 and looked set to be sent off the shortest-priced horse in the 90 years history of blue riband hurdling event, following in the footsteps of the three-time winner Sir Ken who at his second Champion Hurdle start back in 1953 was also sent off as the prohibitive 2/5 favourite.

==== Season ending injury ====
On 17 February, Willie Mullins announced that Faugheen has been ruled out for the rest of the season with a suspensory ligament injury, described by the trainer as "small injury, but just bad timing.. It really needs eight or nine weeks rest, and that would be plenty, unfortunately that rules out all of the rest of the National Hunt season". With his forced retreat for the campaign, Mullins was still left with the front three challengers in the Champion Hurdle market but his retained jockey Ruby Walsh explained: "It's like someone whipping the ace out of the pack and handing you the rest of the cards". The injury followed the roller coaster events of Faugheen's season that started with the surprise defeat on reappearance and succeeded with the latest performance for which he was rated the best two-mile hurdler of the century by the official handicappers, as well as the private organizations Timeform and Racing Post. However, Mullins was optimistic about the prospect of Faugheen returning for the next season "The prognosis is very good.. We will just call it quits for this season and hopefully come back as good as new".

=== 2017/2018 National Hunt season ===
After a period of 22 months off track, Faugheen made his eagerly awaited reappearance in the Morgiana Hurdle. He was due to make his comeback in this race last season but was ruled out with a bruised foot and few months later he again met with a setback caused by a stress fracture that made Willie Mullins to again put an end to the season.

Faugheen was up against only 3 opponents, of which the former Champion hurdler Jezki who won last time out the Istabraq Hurdle and two improving young hurdlers that were up in class but were coming on back of good runs. Faugheen's usual rider Ruby Walsh was injured the previous day and was replaced with former Irish champion jockey Paul Townend who had never ridden him in public. He set off a good gallop on Faugheen from the start and showed his ability was intact by winning hard held 16 lengths back to Jezki who was also well clear of the rest.

==== Leopardstown ====
Faugheen for the first time in his racing career did not travel to England at the end of December, despite holding an entry for the Christmas Hurdle which he won two times previously. He was instead kept home for the December Festival Hurdle at Leopardstown in which he started very short favourite against his recent adversary Campeador from last month Morgiana's Hurdle and 3 more rivals. However, after the race started it was clear to his jockey something was wrong, stating that Faugheen "felt very lacklustre over the first few furlongs" with his stablemate Cilaos Emery pressing and obtaining the lead in the initial stages of the race without Faugheen being able to respond like he would normally by increasing the pace, hence after the third hurdle from home he was pulled out and dismounted by Paul Townend. In the next couple of weeks he was examined and passed a number of tests but no issues were discovered which left his trainer Willie Mullins perplexed as to the cause for the substandard outing, thus aiming him at the Dublin Racing Festival to regain the Irish Champion Hurdle declaring "I'm hoping that if he works well at home and if nothing else comes up, I won't have any worries".

==== Irish Champion Hurdle (2) ====
Faugheen returned to Leopardstown on 3 February 2018 for the Irish Champion Hurdle, which he had won in 2016 and had missed in 2017 due to injury. Partnered by jockey Paul Townend, he started odds on favourite in a field of eight, in spite of his disappointing performance on his previous outing. Faugheen led throughout the race and looked in a good position until the run-in, where he was headed by Supasundae, who went on to win by two-and-a-quarter lengths, with Faugheen taking second place. Owner Rich Ricci commented "Paul [Townend] said he never really picked up like he can. When he winged the second-last, you’d expect him to go on and win his race, and for whatever reason, he didn’t. We’ll carry on to Cheltenham, there's nothing else for him to do. He was brilliant first time out, so we’ll try to recapture that."

==== Champion Hurdle (2) ====
In March 2018 Faugheen returned to Cheltenham and resumed his partnership with Ruby Walsh in an attempt to regain the Champion Hurdle title three years after their victory in 2015, having missed the race in 2016 and 2017 due to injury. Faugheen started at odds of 4–1, the first time since his bumper race in 2012 that he was not odds-on favourite for a race. For the first (and last) time he was running in cheekpieces. Faugheen lead for much of the race but was headed at two out and finished in sixth place behind favourite Buveur D'Air, with Faugheen's stable companion Melon taking second place.

==== Champion Stayers Hurdle ====
Faugheen saw a return to form in the Champion Stayers Hurdle over three miles at Punchestown on 26 April 2018, his final run of the season. Starting third favourite at odds of 11/2 in a field of twelve, he took an early lead and finished 13 lengths clear of the runner-up, favourite Penhill. On this occasion he was ridden for the first time by David Mullins as Ruby Walsh had sustained another injury. Owner Rich Ricci was quoted as saying of the victory: "The ball hasn’t bounced our way all season and to have something like this with a great horse ... it means everything."

=== 2018/2019 National Hunt season ===
As in previous seasons, Faugheen made his reappearance in the Morgiana Hurdle on 18 November 2018 at Punchestown, ridden by Ruby Walsh and sent off as odds-on favourite with only three rivals. Faugheen made most of the running until being headed before the last by Sharjah, who went on to win by seven-and-a-half lengths. After the defeat Ruby Walsh said he thought there was still plenty of life left in Faugheen but suggested he needed a longer trip of two-and-a-half or three miles.

==== Leopardstown Christmas Hurdle ====
"To see him getting up was my Christmas present."

— Ruby Walsh

In December 2018 Faugheen contested the three-mile Christmas Hurdle at Leopardstown and suffered the first fall of his career. Approaching the second last flight he was in second place a couple of lengths behind the leader and eventual winner Apple's Jade when he took off too early and fell heavily on landing. He lay still for a few moments before regaining his feet and being led back in by jockey Ruby Walsh.

==== Stayers' Hurdle and Aintree Hurdle ====
Faugheen returned to the Cheltenham Festival in March 2019, and ran third behind Paisley Park in the Stayers' Hurdle. Three weeks later he raced at Aintree for the first time. At both Cheltenham and Aintree he was ridden by Ruby Walsh. In the Aintree Hurdle he was pulled up and dismounted in the early stages when the rider felt that something was not right. A veterinary examination revealed that he had an irregular heartbeat; by the following day he had recovered and was cleared to return home.

In May 2019 Ruby Walsh, who had ridden Faugheen in 16 of his 21 races over hurdles, announced his retirement. Great British Racing, the official marketing and promotional body for British Horseracing, included Faugheen as one of the jockey's six greatest partnerships with the following tribute:

"Ruby has carried the iconic Rich Ricci silks on board many great horses, but few brought him as much long term success as Faugheen "the machine". He rode him for 16 of his 22 races under rules, winning 10 times including two Christmas Hurdles, and both the Cheltenham and Punchestown Champion Hurdles. Between 2013 and 2015 the pair were nothing short of invincible, winning over any distance and at any course, stylishly dismissing any rival.

Amidst injury concerns, his form started to drift but Ruby's bond with the horse was clear – amicably pulling him up and dismounting at the slightest sign of Faugheen not seeming himself at Aintree this year. This was all the more honourable given Ruby's desire win and is a tremendous testament to his love for the horses. Despite Faugheen's troubles, he still retains enormous ability. The pair will always be remembered for their multiple demolition jobs at the very highest level and era of total domination."

With the retirement of his regular jockey, and in view of his recent misadventures at Leopardstown and Aintree, it might have been considered a good time for 11-year-old Faugheen to embark on a happy retirement or perhaps a second career off the racecourse. But his connections had other plans, and in October 2019 trainer Willie Mullins announced that Faugheen would be joining the ranks of novice chasers for the 2019/2020 National Hunt season.

=== 2019/2020 National Hunt season: Novice chases ===
Faugheen made his chasing debut on 16 November 2019 in a two-and-a-half mile Beginners Chase at Punchestown, starting as odds-on favourite. He quickly took the lead, but a mistake at the eighth fence saw him almost unseat Paul Townend and drop back to third, regaining the lead just before the last and winning by a comfortable 7 1/2 lengths. His next outing was the Grade 1 Greenmount Park Novice Chase at Limerick, where he was ridden by his trainer's son Patrick Mullins and started second favourite to Samcro. As usual he raced from the front and at the second last fence was able to draw away from Samcro and win by ten lengths.

The Flogas Novice Chase at Leopardstown on 2 February 2020 saw twelve-year-old Faugheen, ridden by Paul Townend, starting joint favourite. The other six runners were all horses five and six years younger than he was. Early in the race Faugheen settled into second place behind the other joint favourite, Battleoverdoyen, and then took the lead at two out. On the run-in he was challenged by Easy Game but held on to win by half a length and head to a rapturous welcome in the unsaddling enclosure. With this win, Faugheen had become only the third horse in recent decades to win a Grade One race as a twelve-year-old, the others being Sizing Europe (2014 Champion Chase at Punchestown) and Florida Pearl (2004 Irish Gold Cup). (Although Faugheen was foaled in May 2008 he turned twelve on 1 January 2020 as all racehorses in the Northern Hemisphere have their official birthday on 1 January.) After the race trainer Willie Mullins said: "I've had lots of winners but this was special. The way he battled. To come back at his age and do it on the number one stage, that's fantastic."

In March 2020 Faugheen made his fifth appearance at the Cheltenham Festival, starting at 3/1 favourite in a field of twelve in the Grade 1 Marsh Novices' Chase (Golden Miller Novices' Chase) over 2m4f and sixteen fences. He ran a keen race but a mistake at the third last cost him ground and, in spite of finishing strongly, he was beaten a length into third place by Samcro and Melon. Trainer Willie Mullins said after the race: "It was a hard decision to run him here, we are in the shop window of racing and you consider all things, as he is 12, but I'm delighted we did as the reception here was magic and he ran a stormer. He has been working the house down at home and you could see today that was some performance. If he pings that fence he is right there. I don't know (what happens next), it is a good question. We've got the Punchestown back in Ireland and I think the Irish would like to see him once more time, so if he is fit and well and ready to rock we will probably call it a day then. I'm not sure we will come back for the Gold Cup next year at the age of 13, but we will see what the horse tells us".

=== Retirement ===
After the Marsh Novices' Chase at the 2020 Cheltenham Festival, Faugheen did not race again. His retirement was announced in May 2021 and he joined the living legends at the Irish National Stud.

== Race record ==
Race						Result				Faugheen				
Date	Name	Distance (furlongs)	Course	Class	Runners	Winner	Margin (Lengths)	Runners-up	Time	Odds	Place	Prize Won (€or£)	Jockey	Trainer / Owner
29 April 2012	Maiden Point-to-point	24 (Good)	Ballysteen	-	9	Faugheen	8	2nd.(8 L) Ballingarrow; 3rd.(6 L) West Of The Edge	6:04.00	2/1	1		R P Quinlan	Andrew Slattery / Thomas Hassett
Season 2011–2012 :										Form: 1/				
11 May 2013	INH Flat Race	16 (Yielding)	Punchestown	-	22	Faugheen	22	2nd.(22 L) Josses Hill; 3rd.(1/2 L) Stonebrook	3:48.30	11/8F	1	€5,520	Patrick Mullins	W. P. Mullins / Mrs Susannah Ricci
Season 2012–2013 :										Form: 1/				
17 November 2013	EBF Maiden Hurdle	22 (Yielding)	Punchestown	4	10	Faugheen	6.5	2nd.(6 1/2 L) Chute Hall; 3rd.(1 1/2 L) Oscar Chimes	5:39.10	1/5F	1	€8,970	Ruby Walsh	″ ″
7 December 2013	Meath Novice Hurdle	20 (Good To Yielding)	Navan	4	8	Faugheen	4.25	2nd.(4 1/4 L) Empire Of Dirt; 3rd.(5 L) The Winkler	5:01.70	1/9F	1	€8,970	Ruby Walsh	″ ″
28 December 2013	Dorans Pride Novice Hurdle	24 (Heavy)	Limerick	1 (G3) ^{[1]}	7	Faugheen	5	2nd.(5 L) The Job Is Right; 3rd.(31 L) Azorian	6:15.60	8/13F	1	€18,525	Emmet Mullins	″ ″
12 March 2014	Cheltenham Novices' Hurdle	21 (Good)	Cheltenham	1 (G1)	15	Faugheen	4.5	2nd.(4 1/2 L) Ballyalton; 3rd.(1/2 L) Rathvinden	4:54.80	6/4F	1	£68,340	Ruby Walsh	″ ″
29 April 2014	Herald Champion Novice Hurdle	16 (Good To Yielding)	Punchestown	1 (G1)	8	Faugheen	12	2nd.(12 L) Valseur Lido; 3rd.(1 1/4 L) Sgt Reckless	3:57.60	1/2F	1	€55,800	Ruby Walsh	″ ″
Season 2013–2014 :										Form: 11111/				
22 November 2014	Ascot Hurdle	19.5 (Soft)	Ascot	1 (G2)	7	Faugheen	3.75	2nd.(3 3/4 L) Blue Fashion; 3rd.(5 L) Lac Fontana	4:47.70	1/4F	1	£50,643	Ruby Walsh	″ ″
26 December 2014	Christmas Hurdle	16 (Good To Soft)	Kempton	1 (G1)	6	Faugheen	8	2nd.(8 L) Purple Bay; 3rd.(9 L) Blue Heron	3:46.30	4/11F	1	£57,218	Ruby Walsh	″ ″
10 March 2015	Champion Hurdle	16.5 (Good To Soft)	Cheltenham	1 (G1)	8	Faugheen	1.5	2nd.(1 1/2 L) Arctic Fire; 3rd.(5 L) Hurricane Fly	3:50.90	4/5F	1	£227,800	Ruby Walsh	″ ″
1 May 2015	Punchestown Champion Hurdle	16 (Good To Yielding)	Punchestown	1 (G1)	4	Faugheen	8	2nd.(8 L) Arctic Fire; 3rd.(8 1/2 L) Dell' Arca	3:56.30	1/6F	1	€120,000	Ruby Walsh	″ ″
Season 2014–2015 :										Form: 1111/				
15 November 2015	Morgiana Hurdle	16 (Soft)	Punchestown	1 (G1)	5	Nichols Canyon	0.5	2nd.(1/2 L) Faugheen; 3rd.(1 1/4 L) Wicklow Brave	3:58.10	1/6F	2	€16,150	Ruby Walsh	″ ″
26 December 2015	Christmas Hurdle	16 (Good To Soft)	Kempton	1 (G1)	5	Faugheen	7	2nd.(7 L) The New One; 3rd.(3/4 L) Hargam	3:47.70	1/4F	1	£56,950	Ruby Walsh	″ ″
24 January 2016	Irish Champion Hurdle	16 (Soft)	Leopardstown	1 (G1)	5	Faugheen	15	2nd.(15 L) Arctic Fire; 3rd.(13 L) Nichols Canyon	3:54.00	30/100F	1	€66,000	Ruby Walsh	″ ″
17 February 2016	Season 2015–2016 :									Form: 211/				
19 November 2017	Morgiana Hurdle	16 (Soft To Heavy)	Punchestown	1 (G1)	4	Faugheen	16	2nd.(16 L) Jezki; 3rd.(37 L) Swamp Fox	4:00.00	4/11F	1	€50,150	Paul Townend	″ ″
29 December 2017	December Festival Hurdle	16 (Soft)	Leopardstown	1 (G1)	5	Mick Jazz	1.75	2nd.(1 3/4 L) Cilaos Emery; 3rd.(22 3/4 L) Campeador	4:04.90	1/6F	Pulled Up		Paul Townend	″ ″
3 February 2018	Irish Champion Hurdle	16 (Soft)	Leopardstown	1 (G1)	8	Supersundae	2.25	2nd.(2 1/4 L) Faugheen; 3rd.(4 3/4 L) Mick Jazz	4:00.90	9/10F	2	€28,500	Paul Townend	″ ″
13 March 2018	Champion Hurdle	16.5 (Heavy)	Cheltenham	1 (G1)	11	Buveur D'Air	0.25	2nd.(1/4 L) Melon; 3rd.(3 L) Mick Jazz	4:05.00	4/1	6	£6,268	Ruby Walsh	″ ″
26 April 2018	Champion Stayers Hurdle	24 (Yielding To Soft)	Punchestown	1 (G1)	12	Faugheen	13	2nd.(13 L) Penhill; 3rd.(4 3/4 L) Shaneshill	6:04.10	11/2	1	€162,250	David Mullins	″ ″
Season 2017–2018 :										Form: 1PU261/				
18 November 2018	Morgiana Hurdle	16 (Good)	Punchestown	1 (G1)	4	Sharjah	7.5	2nd.(7 1/2 L) Faugheen; 3rd.(10 L) Tombstone	3:47.70	2/5F	2	€19,000	Ruby Walsh	″ ″
28 December 2018	Leopardstown Christmas Hurdle	24 (Good To Yielding)	Leopardstown	1 (G1)	7	Apple's Jade	26	2nd.(26 L) Early Doors; 3rd.(3 1/4 L) Bapaume	6:01.10	7/2	Fell		Ruby Walsh	″ ″
14 March 2019	Stayers' Hurdle	24 (Good To Soft)	Cheltenham	1 (G1)	18	Paisley Park	2.75	2nd.(2 3/4 L) Sam Spinner; 3rd.(4 L) Faugheen	5:53.33	4/1	3	£34,483	Ruby Walsh	″ ″
4 April 2019	Aintree Hurdle	20 (Soft)	Aintree	1 (G1)	7	Supasundae	1.25	2nd.(1 1/4 L) Buveur D'Air; 3rd.(1/2 L) Ch'tibello	5:10.00	4/1	Pulled Up		Ruby Walsh	″ ″
Season 2018–2019 :										Form: 2F3PU/				
16 November 2019	Beginners Chase	20 (Soft)	Punchestown	-	17	Faugheen	7.25	2nd.(7 1/4 L) Walk Away; 3rd.(5 1/4 L) Lord Schnitzel	5:25.60	8/11F	1	€8,570	Paul Townend	″ ″
26 December 2019	Greenmount Park Novice Chase	19.5 (Heavy)	Limerick	1 (G1)	7	Faugheen	10	2nd.(10 L) Samcro; 3rd.(22 L) Castlebrook	5:30.80	2/1	1	€59,000	Patrick Mullins	″ ″
2 February 2020	Flogas Novice Chase	21 (Yielding)	Leopardstown	1 (G1)	7	Faugheen	0.5	2nd.(1/2 L) Easy Game; 3rd.(6 L) Tornado Flyer	5:34.40	13/8JF	1	€88,500	Paul Townend	″ ″
12 March 2020	Marsh Novices' Chase	20 (Soft)	Cheltenham	1 (G1)	12	Samcro	nose	2nd.(nose) Melon; 3rd.(1 L) Faugheen	5:7.32	3/1F	3	£15,915	Paul Townend	″ ″

Note

^{1} Dorans Pride Novice Hurdle was upgraded to Grade 2 in 2015 after Faugheen and Martello Tower subsequently won at the Cheltenham Festival in the same season.

== Pedigree ==
Pedigree of Faugheen (IRE), bay gelding, 2008
Sire Germany (USA) 1991	Trempolino (USA); 1984	Sharpen Up	Atan
Sire Germany (USA) 1991	Trempolino (USA); 1984	Sharpen Up	Rocchetta
Sire Germany (USA) 1991	Trempolino (USA); 1984	Trephine	Viceregal
Sire Germany (USA) 1991	Trempolino (USA); 1984	Trephine	Quiriquina
Sire Germany (USA) 1991	Inca Princess (USA); 1983	Big Spruce	Herbager
Sire Germany (USA) 1991	Inca Princess (USA); 1983	Big Spruce	Silver Sari
Sire Germany (USA) 1991	Inca Princess (USA); 1983	Inca Queen	Hail To Reason
Sire Germany (USA) 1991	Inca Princess (USA); 1983	Inca Queen	Silver Spoon
Dam Miss Pickering (IRE) 2001	Accordion (IRE); 1986	Sadler's Wells	Northern Dancer
Dam Miss Pickering (IRE) 2001	Accordion (IRE); 1986	Sadler's Wells	Fairy Bridge
Dam Miss Pickering (IRE) 2001	Accordion (IRE); 1986	Sound of Success	Successor
Dam Miss Pickering (IRE) 2001	Accordion (IRE); 1986	Sound of Success	Belle Musique
Dam Miss Pickering (IRE) 2001	Make Me An Island (IRE); 1985	Creative Plan	Sham
Dam Miss Pickering (IRE) 2001	Make Me An Island (IRE); 1985	Creative Plan	Another Treat
Dam Miss Pickering (IRE) 2001	Make Me An Island (IRE); 1985	Bali	Ballymoss
Dam Miss Pickering (IRE) 2001	Make Me An Island (IRE); 1985	Bali	Near the Line (Family: 16-a)
