= 2015 Champion Hurdle =

Horse race

85th Champion Hurdle
- Champion Hurdle
- Location: Cheltenham Racecourse
- Date: 10 March 2015
- Winning horse: Faugheen (IRE)
- Jockey: Ruby Walsh
- Trainer: Willie Mullins (IRE)

The 2015 Champion Hurdle was a horse race held at Cheltenham Racecourse on Tuesday 10 March 2015. It was the 85th running of the Champion Hurdle.

Eight horses started the race, the lowest number in more than 30 years. The winner of the race was Faugheen, a seven-year-old gelding ridden by Ruby Walsh and trained in Ireland by Willie Mullins.

== The contenders ==
Four of the eight runners were considered serious contenders for victory. Faugheen had won the Baring Bingham Novices' Hurdle at the previous year's festival and extended his unbeaten run with victories in the Ascot Hurdle and the Christmas Hurdle. The seven-year-old Jezki was back to defend the championship he had won in 2014, as was the eleven-year-old Hurricane Fly who had won the race in 2011 and 2013. Jezki and Hurricane Fly had already met three times that year, with the older horse winning on each occasion. The New One, a somewhat unlucky third behind Jezki in 2014, was considered by far the best two-mile hurdler in England after winning his last five races. The other four runners were Arctic Fire, who had divided Hurricane Fly and Jezki when finishing second in the Irish Champion Hurdle, Vaniteux (runner-up to The New One in the International Hurdle), Kitten Rock (winner of his last four races including the Red Mills Trial Hurdle) and Bertimont (runner-up to The New One in the Champion Hurdle Trial). Faugheen started the 4/5 favourite ahead of The New One (100/30), Jezki (6/1) and Hurricane Fly (8/1).

== The race ==
Ruby Walsh sent Faugheen into the lead from the start. The New One and Jezki disputed second and third in the early stages ahead of Hurricane Fly, Vaniteux and Kitten Rock, whilst Arctic Fire and Bertimont were restrained at the back of the field. The runner remained closely grouped until the approach to the second last. At this point Jezki and The New One moved up on the outside of the leader with Hurricane Fly apparently travelling well and Arctic Fire making progress as the other three runners began to struggle. Faugheen turned into the straight with a narrow lead over Jezki but broke clear again on the approach to the final flight at which point The New One began to fade. Faugheen jumped the last with a three length advantage over Arctic Fire, who had overtaken Hurricane Fly and Jezki to move into second. Arctic Fire continued to make progress on the run-in, but Faugheen prevailed by one and a half lengths, with a five length gap back to Hurricane Fly who took third ahead of Jezki and The New One. Kitten Rock was sixth with long gap back to Bertimont and Vaniteux.

== Race details ==
- Sponsor: Stan James
- Purse: £393,480.00; First prize: £227,800.00
- Going: Good to Soft
- Distance: 2 miles 110 yards
- Number of runners: 8
- Winner's time: 3m 50.90s

== Full result ==
Pos.	Marg.	Horse (bred)	Age	Jockey	Trainer (Country)	Odds
1		Faugheen (IRE)	7	Ruby Walsh	Willie Mullins (IRE)	4/5 fav
2	1½	Arctic Fire (GER)	7	Danny Mullins	Willie Mullins (IRE)	20/1
3	5	Hurricane Fly (IRE)	11	Paul Townend	Willie Mullins (IRE)	8/1
4	1¾	Jezki (IRE)	7	A. P. McCoy	Jessica Harrington (IRE)	6/1
5	½	The New One (IRE)	7	Sam Twiston-Davies	Nigel Twiston-Davies (GB)	100/30
6	1	Kitten Rock (FR)	5	Noel Fehily	Edward O'Grady (IRE)	28/1
7	6	Bertimont (FR)	5	Harry Skelton	Dan Skelton (GB)	100/1
8	12	Vaniteux (FR)	6	Barry Geraghty	Nicky Henderson (GB)	25/1

- Abbreviations: nse = nose; nk = neck; hd = head; dist = distance
