= Dorans Pride Novice Hurdle =

Hurdle horse race in Ireland

Dorans Pride Novice Hurdle
2025
Kazansky	County Final	Yeshil

Previous years
2024
The Big Westerner	Mozzies Sister	Minella Sixo
2023
Loughglynn	Stellar Story	Answer To Kayf
2022
Favori De Champdou	Letsbeclearaboutit	Harry Des Ongrais
2021
Eric Bloodaxe	Freedom To Dream	Angels Dawn

2020-2011
2020
Farouk D'Alene	Vanillier	Darrens Hope
2019
Fury Road	Well Set Up	Vis Ta Loi
2018
Derrinross	Defi Bleu	Pleasure Dome
2017
Fabulous Saga	Delta Work	Burren Life
2016
Penhill	Call The Taxie	Livelovelaugh
2015
Up For Review	Jetstream Jack	Nambour
2014
Martello Tower	Outlander	Measureofmydreams
2013
Faugheen	The Job Is Right	Azorian
2012
Our Vinnie	Pride Of the Parish	Ma Belle Amie
2011
My Murphy	Please Talk	Best Served Cold

2010-2003
2010
Knockfierna	Start Me Up	Ballinahow Lady
2009
Enterprise Park	Quito De La Roque	Hugo De Vindecy
2008
Weapon's Amnesty	Browns Baily	Prince Rudi
2007
Glenrock Leader	Sigma Digital	Scavenger
2006
Kazal	Foligold	Orge D'ete
2005
Vic Venturi	Mister Top Notch	Purple Shuffle
2004
Our Ben	Kerryhead Windfarm	Haggle Twins
2003
Inexorable	Moscow Court	No Small Plans

The Dorans Pride Novice Hurdle is a Grade 2 National Hunt novice hurdle in Ireland which is open to horses aged four years or older.

It is run at Limerick over a distance of 3 miles (4,828 metres) and during its running there are 14 flights of hurdles to be jumped. It is scheduled to take place each year in late December.

The race was first run in 2003 and is named as a tribute to Dorans Pride a top class staying hurdler and chaser trained by Michael Hourigan. It was upgraded from Grade 3 to Grade 2 in 2015 having been won by Faugheen and Martello Tower in the previous two renewals. The 2016 and 2017 runnings were sponsored by Guinness and run as the Guinness Novice Hurdle. In 2018 it was sponsored by Sky Sports and since 2019 the sponsor has been Lyons of Limerick.

== Records ==
Leading jockey (2 wins):

- Emmet Mullins - Enterprise Park (2009), Faugheen (2013)
- Niall Madden – Knockfierna (2010), Our Vinnie (2012)
- Danny Mullins - Martello Tower (2014), Fabulous Saga (2017)

Leading trainer (7 wins):

- Willie Mullins – Our Ben (2004), Enterprise Park (2009), Faugheen (2013), Up For Review (2015), Penhill (2016), Fabulous Saga (2017), Loughglynn (2023)

== Winners ==
Year	Winner	Age	Jockey	Trainer
2003	Inexorable	5	M D Grant	David Wachman
2004	Our Ben	5	Davy Condon	Willie Mullins
2005	Vic Venturi	5	B T O'Connell (Note: amateur jockey)	Philip Fenton
2006	Kazal	5	David Casey	Eoin Griffin
2007	Glenrock Leader	5	A D Leigh	Jessica Harrington
2008	Weapon's Amnesty	5	Robbie Power	Charles Byrnes
2009	Enterprise Park	5	Emmet Mullins	Willie Mullins
2010	Knockfierna	5	Niall Madden	Charles Byrnes
2011	My Murphy	5	Shay Barry	W J Burke
2012	Our Vinnie	5	Niall Madden	Charles Byrnes
2013	Faugheen	5	Emmet Mullins	Willie Mullins
2014	Martello Tower	6	Danny Mullins	Margaret Mullins
2015	Up For Review (Note: The 2015 running took place at Punchestown after the original fixture at Limerick was abandoned)	6	Ruby Walsh	Willie Mullins
2016	Penhill	5	Paul Townend	Willie Mullins
2017	Fabulous Saga	5	Danny Mullins	Willie Mullins
2018	Derrinross	7	Luke Dempsey	Philip Dempsey
2019	Fury Road	5	Davy Russell	Gordon Elliott
2020	Farouk D'Alene	5	Jody McGarvey	Gordon Elliott
2021	Eric Bloodaxe	6	Bryan Cooper	Joseph O'Brien
2022	Favori De Champdou	7	Jordan Gainford	Gordon Elliott
2023	Loughglynn	5	Sean O'Keeffe	Willie Mullins
2024	The Big Westerner	5	Darragh O'Keeffe	Henry de Bromhead
2025	Kazansky	5	Danny Gilligan	Gordon Elliott

== See also ==
- Horse racing in Ireland
- List of Irish National Hunt races
