= Dr P. J. Moriarty Novice Chase =

Steeplechase horse race in Ireland

Dr. P.J. Moriarty Novice Chase
2026
Kaid D'authie	Western Fold	Final Demand

Previous years
2025
Ballyburn	Croke Park	Impaire Et Passe
2024
Fact To File	Finished alone	Only two ran
2023
Mighty Potter	Adamantly Chosen	Gaillard Du Mesnil
2022
Galopin Des Champs	Master Mcshee	Gaillard Du Mesnil
2021
Monkfish	Latest Exhibition	Andy Dufresne

2020-2011
2020
Faugheen	Easy Game	Tornado Flyer
2019
La Bague Au Roi	Kaiser Black	Hardline
2018
Monalee	Al Boum Photo	Invitation Only
2017
Disko	Our Duke	Balko Des Flos
2016
Outlander	Monksland	Pont Alexandre
2015
Apache Stronghold	Valseur Lido	Adriana Des Mottes
2014
Ballycasey	Don Cossack	Carlingford Lough
2013
Boston Bob	Texas Jack	Lord Windermere
2012
Last Instalment	Call The Police	Lambro
2011
Bostons Angel	Magnanimity	Mikael D'Haguenet

2010-2001
2010
Citizen Vic	Weapon's Amnesty	Roberto Goldback
2009
Cooldine	Forpadydeplasterer	Trafford Lad
2008
J'y Vole	Big Zeb	Abbeybraney
2007
Mister Top Notch	Vic Venturi	One Cool Cookie
2006
The Railway Man	Father Matt	Our Ben
2005
Carrigeen Victor	Well Presented	Doodle Addle
2004
Pizarro	Mossy Green	Hi Cloy
2003
Barrow Drive	Nomadic	BallyAmber
2002
Harbour Pilot	Truckers Tavern	Youlneverwalkalone
2001
Sackville	Shannon Gale	River Clodagh

2000-1997
2000
Native Upmanship	Commanche Court	To Your Honour
1999
Nick Dundee	Sarsfield The Man	Inis Cara
1998
Florida Pearl	Boss Doyle	Hill Society
1997
Dorans Pride	See More Business	Dun Belle

The Dr P. J. Moriarty Novice Chase, currently known for sponsorship purposes as the Ladbrokes Novice Chase, is a Grade 1 National Hunt steeplechase in Ireland which is open to horses aged five years or older. It is run at Leopardstown over a distance of about 2 miles and 5 furlongs (4,225 metres), and during its running there are fourteen fences to be jumped. The race is for novice chasers, and it is scheduled to take place each year in February.

The first version of the race was established in 1989, and during its early years the event was known by various titles. The name of Dr P. J. Moriarty Novice Chase (initially including the word "Memorial") was introduced in 1998, at which time the race was classed at Grade 2 level. It was promoted to Grade 1 status in 2002. Since 2015 the race has been sponsored by Flogas Ireland Ltd and run for the Dr P. J. Moriarty Trophy.

Winners of the event sometimes go on to compete in the Brown Advisory Novices' Chase in March. Four horses have achieved victory in both races – Florida Pearl (1998), Cooldine (2009), Bostons Angel (2011) and Monkfish (2021).

The Willie Mullins-trained Faugheen became the oldest winner of the race in 2020, and went on to finish third in the Marsh Novices' Chase at the 2020 Cheltenham Festival

== Records ==
Leading jockey since 1989 (6 wins):

- Paul Townend – Citizen Vic (2010), Boston Bob (2012), Faugheen (2020), Monkfish (2021), Galopin Des Champs (2022), Ballyburn (2025)

Leading trainer since 1989 (13 wins):

- Willie Mullins – Florida Pearl (1998), J'y Vole (2008), Cooldine (2009), Citizen Vic (2010), Boston Bob (2013), Ballycasey (2014), Outlander (2016), Faugheen (2020), Monkfish (2021), Galopin Des Champs (2022), Fact To File (2024), Ballyburn (2025). Kaid d'Authie (2026)

== Winners ==
- Amateur jockeys indicated by "Mr".

Year	Winner	Age	Jockey	Trainer
1989	Mirage Day	6	Mickey Flynn	Michael Cunningham
1990	Cahervillahow	6	Charlie Swan	Mouse Morris
1991	Firions Law	6	Kevin O'Brien	Victor Bowens
1992	Mass Appeal	7	Charlie Swan	Victor Bowens
1993	Flashing Steel	8	Richard Dunwoody	John Mulhern
1994	Merry Gale	6	Kevin O'Brien	Jim Dreaper
1995	Harcon	7	Kevin O'Brien	Jim Dreaper
1996	Major Rumpus	8	Francis Woods	Arthur Moore
1997	Dorans Pride	8	Shane Broderick	Michael Hourigan
1998	Florida Pearl	6	Richard Dunwoody	Willie Mullins
1999	Nick Dundee	7	Norman Williamson	Edward O'Grady
2000	Native Upmanship	7	Conor O'Dwyer	Arthur Moore
2001	Sackville	8	David Casey	Frances Crowley
2002	Harbour Pilot	7	Paul Carberry	Noel Meade
2003	Barrow Drive	7	Jim Culloty	Tony Mullins
2004	Pizarro	7	Barry Geraghty	Edward O'Grady
2005	Carrigeen Victor	7	Robbie Power	Jessica Harrington
2006	The Railway Man	7	Davy Russell	Arthur Moore
2007	Mister Top Notch	8	Conor O'Dwyer	Davy Fitzgerald
2008	J'y Vole	5	Ruby Walsh	Willie Mullins
2009	Cooldine	7	Ruby Walsh	Willie Mullins
2010	Citizen Vic	7	Paul Townend	Willie Mullins
2011	Bostons Angel	7	Robbie Power	Jessica Harrington
2012	Last Instalment	7	Davy Russell	Philip Fenton
2013	Boston Bob	8	Paul Townend	Willie Mullins
2014	Ballycasey	7	Ruby Walsh	Willie Mullins
2015	Apache Stronghold	7	Paul Carberry	Noel Meade
2016	Outlander	8	Bryan Cooper	Willie Mullins
2017	Disko	6	Sean Flanagan	Noel Meade
2018	Monalee	7	Noel Fehily	Henry De Bromhead
2019	La Bague Au Roi	8	Richard Johnson	Warren Greatrex
2020	Faugheen	12	Paul Townend	Willie Mullins
2021	Monkfish	7	Paul Townend	Willie Mullins
2022	Galopin Des Champs	6	Paul Townend	Willie Mullins
2023	Mighty Potter	6	Davy Russell	Gordon Elliott
2024	Fact To File	7	Mark Walsh	Willie Mullins
2025	Ballyburn	7	Paul Townend	Willie Mullins
2026	Kaid d'Authie	6	Mark Walsh	Willie Mullins

== See also ==
- List of Irish National Hunt races
