= Faugheen Novice Chase =

Steeplechase horse race in Ireland

Greenmount Park Novice Chase
2025
Final Demand	Gold Dancer	Western Walk

Previous years
2024
Impaire Et Passe	Jordans	Search For Glory
2023
Gaelic Warrior	Il Etait Temps	Inothewayurthinkin
2022
Gerri Colombe	Adamantly Chosen	Kilcruit
2021
Master Mcshee	Farouk D'Alene	Gabynako

2020-2011
2020
Colreevy	Pencilfulloflead	Janidil
2019
Faugheen	Samcro	Castlebrook
2018
Hardline	Getabird	Riders Onthe Storm
2017
Dounikos	Tombstone	Arbre De Vie
2016
Bellshill	Haymount	Attribution
2015
Outlander	Avant Tout	Free Expression
2014
Gilgamboa	Perfect Gentleman	Wounded Warrior
2013
The Paparrazi Kid	Felix Yonger	Balnaslow
2012
Argocat	Snooze	Far Away So Close
2011
Sir Des Champs	Four Commanders	Quietly Fancied

2010-2001
2010
Mr Cracker	C'est Ca	Kakagh
2009
Dancing Tornado	River Liane	Oscar Looby
2008
Financial Reward	Top Of The Rock	Rock Street
2007
Merry Cowboy	Finger Onthe Pulse	Albanov
2006
One Cool Cookie	Kings Advocate	Chicago Vic
2005
Baily Breeze	Coljon	On The Net
2004
Cane Brake	Il En Reve	Another Dollar
2003
Hi Cloy	Stashedaway	True Blue Victory
2002
Intelligent	Barrow Drive	The Premier Cat
2001
Ellenjay	Copernicus	Risk Accessor

2000-1993
1996
Dun Belle	Ultra Flutter	Woodville Star
1995
Love The Lord	Lisselan Prince	Back Bar
1994
Imperial Call	Monalee River	Front Line
1993
Sullane River	Royal Mountbrowne	Parson's Brig

The Faugheen Novice Chase is a Grade 1 National Hunt race in Ireland. It is run at Limerick Racecourse in late December over a distance of about 2 miles and 3½ furlongs (2 miles 3 furlongs and 160 yards, or 3,968 metres).

The race is run during the course's Christmas Festival and is currently sponsored by Guinness. It was previously contested at Grade 2 level and was raised to Grade 1 status from the 2018 running. Prior to 2020 it was run as the Greenmount Park Novice Chase before being renamed in honour of Faugheen, the 2019 winner of the race.

== Records ==
Leading jockey (3 wins):

- Patrick Mullins - Faugheen (2019), Gaelic Warrior (2023), Final Demand (2025)

Leading trainer (10 wins):

- Willie Mullins – Financial Reward (2008), Sir Des Champs (2011), The Paparrazi Kid (2013), Outlander (2015), Bellshill (2016), Faugheen (2019), Colreevy (2020), Gaelic Warrior (2023), Impaire Et Passe (2024), Final Demand (2025)

== Winners since 1993 ==
Year	Winner	Age	Jockey	Trainer
1993	Sullane River	5	D H O'Connor	David J McGrath
1994	Imperial Call	5	G M O'Neill	Fergie Sutherland
1995	Love The Lord	5	Tommy Treacy	Daniel O'Connell
1996	Dun Belle	7	T J Mitchell	P A Fahy
1997- 2000	No meeting
2001	Ellenjay	7	Barry Cash	Arthur Moore
2002	Intelligent	6	Robbie Power	Jessica Harrington
2003	Hi Cloy	6	Timmy Murphy	Michael Hourigan
2004	Cane Brake	5	M D Grant	David Wachman
2005	Baily Breeze	6	Paddy Flood	Mouse Morris
2006	One Cool Cookie	5	Conor O'Dwyer	Charlie Swan
2007	Merry Cowboy	6	Shane Flanagan	Eamonn Sheehy
2008	Financial Reward	5	David Casey	Willie Mullins
2009	Dancing Tornado	8	David Casey	Michael Hourigan
2010	Mr Cracker	5	Adrian Heskin	Michael Hourigan
2011	Sir Des Champs	5	Emmet Mullins	Willie Mullins
2012	Argocat	4	Andrew McNamara	Tom Taaffe
2013	The Paparrazi Kid	6	Emmet Mullins	Willie Mullins
2014	Gilgamboa	6	Mark Walsh	Enda Bolger
2015	Outlander	7	David Mullins	Willie Mullins
2016	Bellshill	6	Paul Townend	Willie Mullins
2017	Dounikos	6	Andrew Ring	Gordon Elliott
2018	Hardline	6	Keith Donoghue	Gordon Elliott
2019	Faugheen	11	Patrick Mullins (Note: amateur jockey)	Willie Mullins
2020	Colreevy	7	Danny Mullins	Willie Mullins
2021	Master McShee	7	Ian Power	Paddy Corkery
2022	Gerri Colombe	6	Jordan Gainford	Gordon Elliott
2023	Gaelic Warrior	5	Patrick Mullins	Willie Mullins
2024	Impaire Et Passe	6	Daryl Jacob	Willie Mullins
2025	Final Demand	6	Patrick Mullins	Willie Mullins

== See also ==
- Horse racing in Ireland
- List of Irish National Hunt races
