= Martin Pipe Conditional Jockeys' Handicap Hurdle =

Hurdle horse race in Britain

- Class: Ungraded
- Location: Cheltenham Racecourse; Cheltenham, England
- Inaugurated: 2009
- Race type: Hurdle race
- Website: Cheltenham

Race information
- Distance: 2m 4f 56y (4,075 metres)
- Surface: Turf
- Track: Left-handed
- Qualification: Four-years-old and up
- Weight: Handicap
- Purse: £75,000 (2023); 1st: £39,023

Martin Pipe Conditional Jockeys' Handicap Hurdle
2026
Air Of Entitlement	Hot Fuss	Jump Allen

Previous years
2025
Wodhooh	Act Of Authority	Raglan Road
2024
Better Days Ahead	Waterford Whispers	Quai De Bourbon
2023
Iroko	No Ordinary Joe	Buddy One
2022
Banbridge	Cobblers Dream	Hollow Games
2021
Galopin Des Champs	Langer Dan	Floueur

2020-2011
2020
Indefatigable	Pileon	Great White Shark
2019
Early Doors	Dallas Des Pictons	Defi Bleu
2018
Blow By Blow	Discorama	Early Doors
2017
Champagne Classic	Verni	Runfordave
2016
Ibis Du Rheu	Flying Angel	Sky Khan
2015
Killultagh Vic	Noble Endeavor	Roi Des Francs
2014
Don Poli	Thomas Crapper	Caid Du Berlais
2013
Salubrious	Nagpur	Double Ross
2012
Attaglance	Toner D'Oudairies	Oscar Nominee
2011
Sir Des Champs	Son of Flicka	First Point

2010-2009
2010
Pause And Clause	Radium	Clova Island
2009
Andytown	Midnight Chase	Big Eared Fran

The Martin Pipe Conditional Jockeys' Handicap Hurdle is a National Hunt hurdle race in Great Britain for conditional jockeys which is open to horses aged four years or older. It is run on the New Course at Cheltenham over a distance of about 2 miles and 4½ furlongs (2 miles 4 furlongs and 56 yards, or 4,075 metres), and during its running there are nine hurdles to be jumped. It is a handicap race, and it is scheduled to take place each year during the Cheltenham Festival in March.

The event was established in 2009 and is named in honour of Martin Pipe, a highly successful National Hunt trainer who retired in 2006. During his career Pipe was Champion Trainer fifteen times, and his record at the Cheltenham Festival included thirty-four victories.

== Records ==
Most successful horse:

- no horse has won this race more than once

Leading jockey (2 wins) :

- Danny Gilligan - Better Days Ahead (2024), Wodhooh (2025)

Leading trainer (4 wins):

- Willie Mullins – Sir Des Champs (2011), Don Poli (2014), Killultagh Vic (2015), Galopin Des Champs (2021)
- Gordon Elliott - Champagne Classic (2017), Blow By Blow (2018), Better Days Ahead (2024), Wodhooh (2025)

== Winners ==
- Weights given in stones and pounds.

Year	Winner	Age	Weight	Jockey	Trainer
2009	Andytown	6	11-02	Felix de Giles	Nicky Henderson
2010	Pause and Clause	6	11–10	Johnny Farrelly	Emma Lavelle
2011	Sir Des Champs	5	11-06	Emmet Mullins	Willie Mullins
2012	Attaglance	6	11-06	Harry Haynes	Malcolm Jefferson
2013	Salubrious	6	11-08	Harry Derham	Paul Nicholls
2014	Don Poli	5	11-05	Mikey Fogarty	Willie Mullins
2015	Killultagh Vic	6	11-01	Luke Dempsey	Willie Mullins
2016	Ibis du Rheu	5	11-07	Jack Sherwood	Paul Nicholls
2017	Champagne Classic	6	11-03	JJ Slevin	Gordon Elliott
2018	Blow By Blow	7	11-10	Donagh Meyler	Gordon Elliott
2019	Early Doors	6	11-10	Jonjo O'Neill Jr	Joseph O'Brien
2020	Indefatigable	7	11-09	Rex Dingle	Paul Webber
2021	Galopin Des Champs	5	11-09	Sean O'Keefe	Willie Mullins
2022	Banbridge	6	11-03	Mark McDonagh	Joseph O'Brien
2023	Iroko	5	11-05	Aidan Kelly	Oliver Greenall & Josh Guerriero
2024	Better Days Ahead	6	11-07	Danny Gilligan	Gordon Elliott
2025	Wodhooh	5	11-08	Danny Gilligan	Gordon Elliott
2026	Air Of Entitlement	7	11-10	Patrick O'Brien	Henry de Bromhead

== See also ==
- Horse racing in Great Britain
- List of British National Hunt races
