= Don Poli =

- Sire: Poliglote
- Dam: Dalamine
- Damsire: Sillery
- Sex: Gelding
- Foaled: 21 April 2009
- Country: Ireland
- Colour: Bay
- Breeder: Brian J Griffiths and John Nicholson
- Owner: Darren & Annaley Yates
- Trainer: Dan Skelton
- Record: 26:8,5,4
- Earnings: £450,333

Major wins
- Topaz Novice Chase (2014); RSA Chase (2015); Lexus Chase (2016)

Don Poli (foaled 21 April 2009) is a retired Irish thoroughbred racehorse.

Don Poli won three Grade 1 races in his career.

== Career ==
Originally sourced by Seán Tiernan and Bernard Stoffel, Don Poli made his racecourse debut in March 2013 at Auteuil before transferring to Willie Mullins in Ireland. Finishing 2nd in his first race for Mullins at Navan, Don Poli would go on to win twice before attending his first Cheltenham Festival in 2014. He would win the Martin Pipe Conditional Jockeys Handicap Hurdle by over 4 lengths.

Building up to the 2015 Cheltenham Festival he switched to Chase fences and won twice including the Grade 1 Topaz Novices Chase at Leopardstown. In March he won the 2015 RSA Chase by 6 lengths. He followed this up with an unsuccessful trip to Punchestown, but was a winner on return in December 2015 twice first at Aintree and later in the Grade 1 Lexus Chase at Leopardstown.

Don Poli would line up for the 2016 Cheltenham Gold Cup but ultimately finished in third. Don Poli's owners, Gigginstown House Stud had the winner of the race with Don Cossack. Two more grade 1 runs would follow, finishing second in the Betway Bowl and third in the Punchestown Gold Cup. After this training duties were switched to Gordon Elliott.

Through the remainder of 2016, Don Poli failed to recapture his former form and had a 664-day break from racing between February 2017 and December 2018.

In March 2019 it was announced Don Poli would be one of two Gigginstown House Stud horses to be sold at the Goffs Aintree Sale. He was ultimately sold at auction for £170,000 to Darren & Annaley Yates. He finished 19th in the 2019 Grand National, the first run in their ownership. After being pulled up at Punchestown, training switched to Nick Pearce and Don Poli went pointing winning two races at Alnwick.

He returned to Cheltenham for the 2019 Foxhunters Chase but finished only 11th. Training again changed to Dan Skelton, but with two more unsuccessful runs Don Poli was retired on 1st January 2021.
