= Dooley Insurance Group Champion Novice Chase =

Steeplechase horse race in Ireland

- Class: Grade 1
- Location: Punchestown; County Kildare, Ireland
- Race type: Steeplechase
- Sponsor: Dooley Insurance Group
- Website: Punchestown

Race information
- Distance: 3m 120y (4,938 metres)
- Surface: Turf
- Track: Right-handed
- Qualification: Five-years-old and up
- Weight: 11 st 7 lb (5yo); 11 st 12 lb (6yo+); Allowances; 7 lb for mares
- Purse: €100,000 (2021); 1st: €59,000

Champion Novice Chase
2026
Western Fold	Fleur In The Park	Nowwhatdoyouthink

Previous years
2025
Champ Kiely	Ballyburn	Stellar Story
2024
Spillane's Tower	Monty's Star	Three Card Brag
2023
Feronily	Appreciate It	James Du Berlais
2022
Capodanno	Lifetime Ambition	Fury Road
2021
Colreevy	Monkfish	Only two finished

2020-2011
2019
Delta Work	Discorama	A Plus Tard
2018
The Storyteller	Monbeg Notorious	Jury Duty
2017
Disko	Anibale Fly	A Genie In Abottle
2016
Zabana	Outlander	Sub Lieutenant
2015
Valseur Lido	Wounded Warrior	Apache Stronghold
2014
Carlingford Lough	Ballycasey	Morning Assembly
2013
Mount Benbulben	Tofino Bay	Lyreen Legend
2012
Sir Des Champs	Shop Dj	Ordinary Man
2011
Quito De La Roque	Western Charmer	Head Of The Posse

2010-2007
2010
Kempes	China Rock	The Midnight Club
2009
Rare Bob	Gone To Lunch	Joncol
2008
Air Force One	Pomme Tiepy	Ballycullen Boy
2007
Offshore Account	Knight Legend	One Cool Cookie

The Dooley Insurance Group Champion Novice Chase is a Grade 1 National Hunt steeplechase in Ireland which is open to horses aged five years or older. It is run at Punchestown over a distance of about 3 miles and ½ furlong (3 miles and 120 yards, or 4,938 metres), and during its running there are seventeen fences to be jumped. The race is for novice chasers, and it is scheduled to take place each year during the Punchestown Festival in late April or early May.

The present version of the race was introduced in 2007, when it was sponsored by Ellier Developments. There had been two similar events in the preceding years – a Grade 2 race over a shorter distance (also sponsored by Ellier), and a handicap race over the same length. The new version was backed by Boylesports in 2009, and by Growise from 2010 to 2018.

The Growise Champion Novice Chase is Ireland's equivalent of the RSA Insurance Novices' Chase at Cheltenham, but no horse has won both races since 2007.

== Records ==
Leading jockey since 2007 (5 wins):

- Davy Russell - Quito De La Roque (2011), Sir Des Champs (2012), Zabana (2016), The Storyteller (2018), Delta Work (2019)

Leading trainer since 2007 (6 wins):

- Willie Mullins - Kempes (2010), Sir Des Champs (2012), Valseur Lido (2015), Colreevy (2021), Capodanno (2022), Champ Kiely (2025)

== Winners since 2007 ==
Year	Winner	Age	Jockey	Trainer
2007	Offshore Account	7	Denis O'Regan	Charlie Swan
2008	Air Force One	6	Noel Fehily	Charlie Mann
2009	Rare Bob	7	Paddy Flood	Dessie Hughes
2010	Kempes	7	Tony McCoy	Willie Mullins
2011	Quito De La Roque	7	Davy Russell	Colm Murphy
2012	Sir Des Champs	6	Davy Russell	Willie Mullins
2013	Mount Benbulben	8	Danny Mullins	Gordon Elliott
2014	Carlingford Lough	8	Tony McCoy	John Kiely
2015	Valseur Lido	6	Ruby Walsh	Willie Mullins
2016	Zabana	7	Davy Russell	Andrew Lynch
2017	Disko	6	Bryan Cooper	Noel Meade
2018	The Storyteller	7	Davy Russell	Gordon Elliott
2019	Delta Work	6	Davy Russell	Gordon Elliott
	no race 2020 (Note: The 2020 running was cancelled because of the COVID-19 pandemic in the Republic of Ireland)
2021	Colreevy	8	Danny Mullins	Willie Mullins
2022	Capodanno	6	Mark Walsh	Willie Mullins
2023	Feronily	6	Donagh Meyler	Emmet Mullins
2024	Spillane's Tower	6	Mark Walsh	Jimmy Mangan
2025	Champ Kiely	9	Danny Mullins	Willie Mullins
2026	Western Fold	7	Jack Kennedy	Gordon Elliott

== See also ==
- Horse racing in Ireland
- List of Irish National Hunt races
