= Emmet Mullins =

Irish racehorse trainer

Emmet Mullins (born 1989/90) is an Irish National Hunt trainer and former jockey based in County Carlow.

== Background and career as a jockey ==
Mullins comes from a racing background. His father, George Mullins, was an amateur jockey and set up a racehorse transport business. His uncle is trainer Willie Mullins. During a career as a jockey from the 2006–07 season to the 2014–15 season, Mullins rode a total of 83 winners, including seven Grade 2 and 3 winners. He rode a winner at the Cheltenham Festival on Sir Des Champs in the Martin Pipe Conditional Jockeys' Handicap Hurdle in 2011. Another notable success came with his only ride on Faugheen when they won the Dorans Pride Novice Hurdle at Limerick in December 2013.

== Career as a trainer ==
Mullins obtained his trainer's licence in 2016 and set up a yard close to his uncle at Bagenalstown, County Carlow. He saddled his first Cheltenham Festival winner in 2021, when The Shunter won the Plate Handicap Chase. In 2022 he saddled the winner of the Grand National, Noble Yeats, ridden by the owner's son Sam Waley-Cohen. In April 2023 he secured his first Grade 1 success, when Feronily won the Dooley Insurance Group Champion Novice Chase at Punchestown.That autumn, Shunter provided Mullins with a notable win on the flat when he took the 2023 Cesarewitch Handicap. In 2026 Mullins saddled the winner of the 2026 Irish Grand National, Soldier In Milan.

In September 2026, Mullins announced that he and owner Paul Byrne had bought Jim Bolger's training yard, Glebe House, in Coolcullen, County Kilkenny. He said that his focus would change to the Flat.

== Racecourse ban ==
In June 2020 Mullins was fined €5,000 by the Irish Horse Racing Regulatory Board and banned from racecourses for three months after he contravened COVID-19 protocols at Leopardstown Racecourse.

== Cheltenham winners (as jockey) ==
- Martin Pipe Conditional Jockeys' Handicap Hurdle - (1) Sir Des Champs (2011)

== Cheltenham winners (as trainer) ==
- Plate Handicap Chase - (1) The Shunter (2021)
- National Hunt Chase Challenge Cup - (1) Corbetts Cross (2024)

== Other major wins (as trainer) ==
(Republic of Ireland) Ireland

- Dooley Insurance Group Champion Novice Chase - (1) Feronily (2023)

(United Kingdom) Great Britain

- Grand National - (1) Noble Yeats (2022)
