= Danny Mullins =

Irish jockey (born 1992)

Danny Mullins (born 23 April 1992) is an Irish jockey who competes in National Hunt racing.

== Background ==
Mullins was born into a racing dynasty in Gowran in County Kilkenny. He is the son of Tony and Mags Mullins, grandson of Paddy and Maureen Mullins, nephew of Willie Mullins and Tom Mullins, and cousin of Patrick Mullins, David Mullins and Emmet Mullins. In his teens he competed in pony racing and won 126 races.

== Racing career ==
Mullins started his racing career as an apprentice jockey on the flat. His first winner was My Girl Sophie, trained by Jim Bolger, at Leopardstown on 21 May 2008. Two months later he rode a treble at the Galway Racing Festival. He came second and third in the champion apprentice title, but increasing weight led him to switch to racing over jumps. He won his first graded race in October 2012, on Down in New Orleans, trained by his mother, in the Grade 3 PricewaterhouseCoopers Chase at Limerick. In January 2013, he was signed as the retained jockey for owner Barry Connell. His first Grade 1 win was in Connell's colours, riding Mount Benbulben, trained by Gordon Elliott, in the Champion Novice Chase at Punchestown in April 2013. He lost his retainer with Connell after less than two years, and went back to riding as a freelance. He often rides for his uncle, Willie Mullins. Although usually on the second or third string, he has won a number of Grade 1 races, including the 2021 Irish Gold Cup on Kemboy for his uncle.

In his first ride in the Aintree Grand National, in 2019, on Up For Review, trained by his uncle, Mullins was brought down at the first fence. His best results in subsequent years were on Meetingofthewaters, also trained by Willie Mullins, who came seventh in 2024 and fifth in 2025. He won the Grand National Hurdle Stakes in 2017, and the Scottish Grand National in 2024.

Having had about forty rides without success for his uncle Willie Mullins at the Cheltenham Festival over the years, his first win came in 2021 when he picked up a spare ride on Flooring Porter in the Stayers' Hurdle for trainer Gavin Cromwell.

== Cheltenham Festival winners (3) ==
- Stayers' Hurdle - (2) - Flooring Porter (2021, 2022)
- Arkle Challenge Trophy - (1) - Kargese (2026)

== Other major wins ==
(Republic of Ireland) Ireland

- Arkle Novice Chase - (1) - Il Etait Temps (2024)
- Barberstown Castle Novice Chase - (1) - Il Etait Temps (2024)
- Dooley Insurance Group Champion Novice Chase - (3) - Mount Benbulben (2013), Colreevy (2021), Champ Kiely (2025)
- Dublin Chase - (2) - Gentleman De Mee (2023), Solness (2025)
- Faugheen Novice Chase - (1) - Colreevy (2020)
- Golden Cygnet Novice Hurdle - (2) - Minella Cocooner (2022),Dancing City (2024)
- Irish Gold Cup - (1) - Kemboy (2021)
- Mares Champion Hurdle - (2) - Stormy Ireland (2021), Place De La Nation (2026)
- Morgiana Hurdle - (1) - Soldier (2019)
- Paddy Power Future Champions Novice Hurdle - (1) - The Tullow Tank (2013)
- Punchestown Champion Chase - 1 - Felix Yonger (2015)
- Royal Bond Novice Hurdle - (3) - The Tullow Tank (2013), Airlie Beach (2016), Statuaire (2021)
- Slaney Novice Hurdle - (1) - Champ Kiely (2023)
- Spring Juvenile Hurdle - (3) - Footpad (2016), Gala Marceau (2023), Kargese (2024)
- Tattersalls Ireland Novice Hurdle - (2) - Asterion Forlonge (2020), Il Etait Temps (2023)
- WillowWarm Gold Cup - (1) - Spindleberry (2025)

(United Kingdom) Great Britain

- Celebration Chase - (1) - Il Etait Temps (2025)
- King George VI Chase - (1) - Tornado Flyer (2021)

France

- Grande Course de Haies d'Auteuil - (1) - Gala Marceau (2023)

United States

- A. P. Smithwick Memorial Steeplechase Stakes - (1) - Historic Heart (2025)
- Grand National Hurdle Stakes - (1) - Mr. Hot Stuff (2017)
