= Sir Des Champs =

French-bred Thoroughbred racehorse

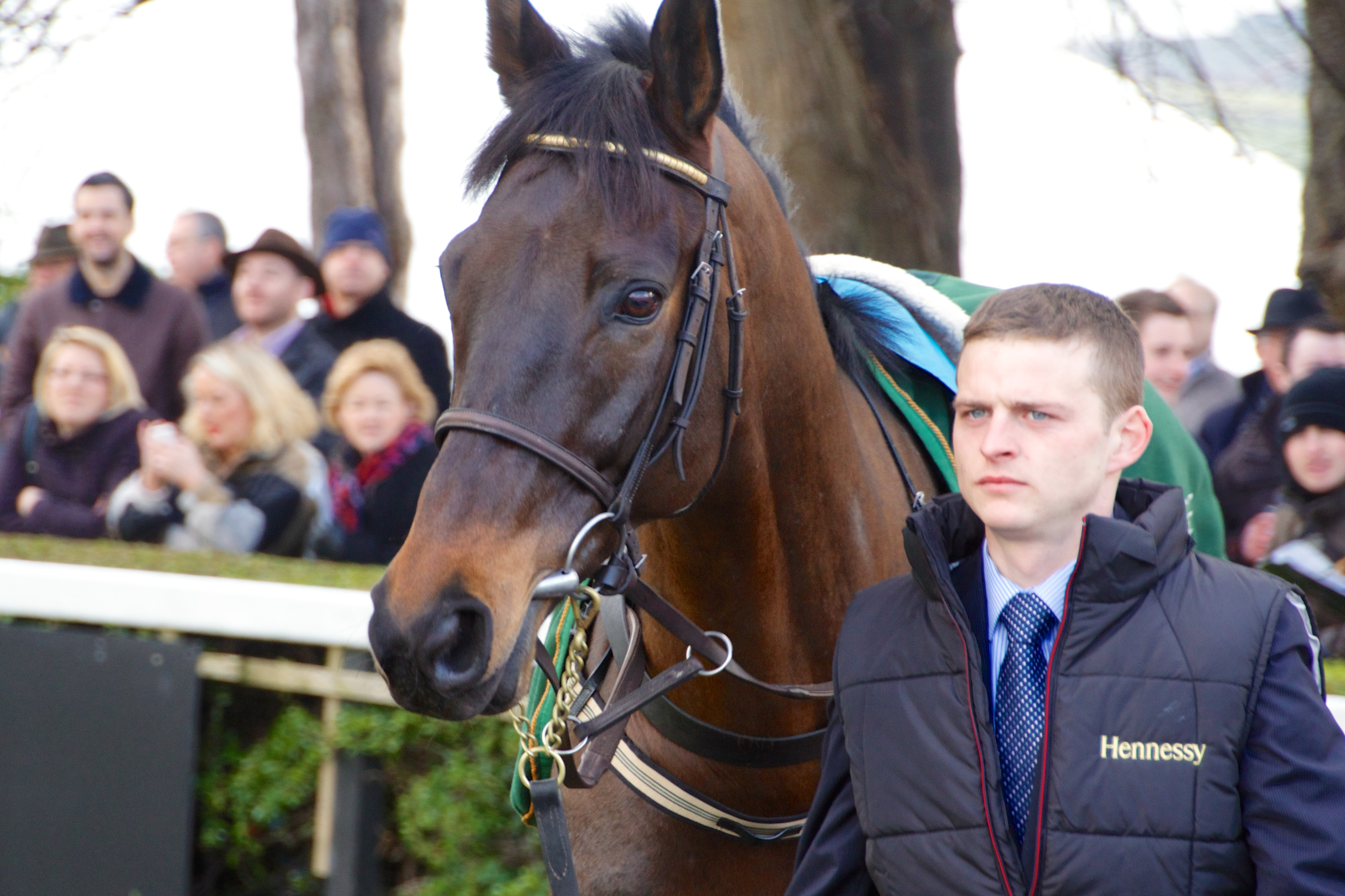
- Sir Des Champs at Leopardstown in February 2013.
- Sire: Robin des Champs
- Grandsire: Garde Royale
- Dam: Liste en Tete
- Damsire: Video Rock
- Sex: Gelding
- Foaled: 28 May 2006
- Country: France
- Colour: Bay
- Breeder: Dominique Clayeux
- Owner: Dominique Clayeux; Gigginstown House Stud
- Trainer: E Clayeux; Willie Mullins
- Record: 19: 10−2−1
- Earnings: £483,896

Major wins
- Martin Pipe Conditional Jockeys' Handicap Hurdle (2011); Greenmount Park Novice Chase (2011); Killiney Novice Chase (2012); Jewson Novices' Chase (2012); Growise Champion Novice Chase (2012); Hennessy Gold Cup (Ireland) (2013); Punchestown Gold Cup (2013)

Sir Des Champs (28 May 2006 – 18 May 2018) was a French-bred, Irish-trained AQPS racehorse who competed in National Hunt races. After winning only one of his five races in his native country, Sir Des Champs was transferred to Ireland and won seven races in succession including the Martin Pipe Conditional Jockeys' Handicap Hurdle, Greenmount Park Novice Chase, Killiney Novice Chase, Jewson Novices' Chase and Growise Champion Novice Chase. The 2012/2013 saw the emergence of a rivalry between Sir Des Champs and another Irish-trained chaser Flemenstar. After beating his rival in the Hennessy Gold Cup, Sir Des Champs was regarded as a leading contender for the 2013 Cheltenham Gold Cup in which he finished second to Bobs Worth. He suffered a fatal injury when competing in Point-to-point racing in May 2018.

== Background ==
Sir Des Champs is a dark-coated bay gelding bred in France by Dominique Clayeux. He was sired by the French Thoroughbred stallion Robin des Champs, whose other progeny include the mare Quevega a six-time winner of the David Nicholson Mares' Hurdle. Sir Des Champs' dam Liste en Tete was a Selle Français mare.

== Racing career ==
=== 2009/10 National Hunt season ===
Sir Des Champs began his racing career at Nancy on 8 November 2009 when he finished sixth in a 2400 metre hurdle race. He was unsuccessful in three more races at minor French tracks before recording his first success at Auteuil Hippodrome on 14 March when he won the Prix de l'Yonne over 3300 metres.

In the autumn of 2010, Sir Des Champs was sent to Ireland, where he joined the stable of Willie Mullins in County Carlow.

=== 2010/11 National Hunt season ===
On his first appearance for his new trainer, Sir Des Champs won a two-mile hurdle race at Navan Racecourse on 25 January 2011. Two months later, Sir Des Champs was sent to England, where he was one of twenty-three runners to contest the Martin Pipe Conditional Jockeys' Handicap Hurdle. Ridden by Emmet Mullins he took the lead on the run-in and won by half a length from Son of Flicka.

=== 2011/12 National Hunt season ===
In the 2011/2012 National Hunt season, Sir Des Champs was campaigned in novice steeplechases and was unbeaten in five races. On his first appearance of the season in November he started the 2/7 favourite for a beginners' chase at Fairyhouse Racecourse and won by eight and a half lengths from Gran Torino. A month later he was moved up to Grade 1 class for the Greenmount Park Novice Chase at Limerick and won by seven lengths from Four Commanders. On his final race before the 2012 Cheltenham Festival, Sir Des Champs won the Grade 2 Killiney Novice Chase at Leopardstown Racecourse, despite making a mistake at the last fence. His performance led Willie Mullins to describe the gelding as "a serious machine". On 15 March 2012, Sir Des Champs was one of ten runners to contest the Golden Miller Novices' Chase over two and a half miles at Cheltenham. Ridden by Davy Russell, he took the lead on the run-in and won easily by four and a half lengths from Champion Court to record his second consecutive Festival win. After the race his owner revealed that he had considered running the gelding in the three mile RSA Chase and Willie Mullins indicated that Sir Des Champs would be aimed at the following year's Cheltenham Gold Cup. In April Sir Des Champs was moved up in distance for the Growise Champion Novice Chase over three miles and a furlong at the Punchestown Festival. He started the 2/7 favourite and despite almost unseating Davy Russell at the last fence, he won by thirty-six lengths.

=== 2012/13 National Hunt season ===
Sir Des Champs' opening race of the 2012/2013 season was the John Durkan Memorial Punchestown Chase which saw him matched for the first time against Flemenstar, the winner of the Arkle Novice Chase and the Powers Gold Cup. Davy Russell on Sir Des Champs tracked Flemenstar for most of the race, but was unable to make any progress in the straight and was beaten into second place by five lengths. Sir Des Champs and Flemenstar met again in the Lexus Chase at Leopardstown in December. In a dramatic and closely contested finish, Sir Des Champs finished fourth behind Tidal Bay, First Lieutenant and Flememstar, beaten less than a length by the winner. The third clash between Sir Des Champs and Flemenstar took place on 9 February in the Hennessy Gold Cup at Leopardstown. Davy Russell sent the French gelding into a narrow lead three fences from the finish and Sir Des Champs stayed on strongly in the straight to beat Flemenstar by one and three quarter lengths. In the Cheltenham Gold Cup on 15 March he tracked the leader Long Run until challenging for the lead entering the straight. He was overtaken by Bobs Worth approaching the second last fence and despite rallying on the run-in was beaten seven lengths by the favourite. On 24 April Sir Des Champs started 2/1 favourite for the Punchestown Gold Cup over three miles and one furlong on soft ground. He moved up to dispute the lead three fences from the finish and held off the challenges of Long Run and First Lieutenant to win by three-quarters of a length and half a length. Mullins described it as "a great performance" and praised the riding of Russell saying "Davy gave him an enterprising ride. He grabbed the bull by the horns at the third last".

=== 2013/14 National Hunt season ===
As in the previous season Sir Des Champs began his campaign in the Punchestown Chase in early December. He took an early lead but fell at the third fence, allowing his stable companion Arvika Ligeonniere to win easily by nine lengths from Rubi Light. In the Lexus Chase later that month he finished fourth behind Bobs Worth, First Lieutenant and Rubi Ball after making a slight mistake at the last fence. On 3 January, Mullins announced that Sir Des Champs had sustained a tendon injury and would miss the rest of the season.

=== 2015/2016 National Hunt season ===
Sir Des Champs returned from injury in November 2015 to win the Boomerang Animal Bedding And Boomerang Horse & Country Store Chase and beating Rubi Light by 2 and 3/4 lengths but failed to make any impression in future grade 1's against stablemates Don Poli and Rule The World.

== Pedigree ==
Pedigree of Sir Des Champs (FR), bay gelding, 2006
Sire Robin des Champs (FR) 1997	Garde Royale (IRE); 1980	Mill Reef	Never Bend
Sire Robin des Champs (FR) 1997	Garde Royale (IRE); 1980	Mill Reef	Milan Mill
Sire Robin des Champs (FR) 1997	Garde Royale (IRE); 1980	Royal Way	Sicambre
Sire Robin des Champs (FR) 1997	Garde Royale (IRE); 1980	Royal Way	Right Way
Sire Robin des Champs (FR) 1997	Relayeuse (FR); 1987	Iron Duke	Sicambre
Sire Robin des Champs (FR) 1997	Relayeuse (FR); 1987	Iron Duke	Insulaire
Sire Robin des Champs (FR) 1997	Relayeuse (FR); 1987	Reliorneuse	El Relicario
Sire Robin des Champs (FR) 1997	Relayeuse (FR); 1987	Reliorneuse	Ordonneuse
Dam Liste en Tete (FR) 1999	Video Rock (FR); 1984	No Lute	Luthier
Dam Liste en Tete (FR) 1999	Video Rock (FR); 1984	No Lute	Prudent Miss
Dam Liste en Tete (FR) 1999	Video Rock (FR); 1984	Pauvresse	Home Guard
Dam Liste en Tete (FR) 1999	Video Rock (FR); 1984	Pauvresse	Misoptimist
Dam Liste en Tete (FR) 1999	Badrapette (FR); 1989	Bad Conduct	Stalwart
Dam Liste en Tete (FR) 1999	Badrapette (FR); 1989	Bad Conduct	White Lie
Dam Liste en Tete (FR) 1999	Badrapette (FR); 1989	Trapette	Perouges
Dam Liste en Tete (FR) 1999	Badrapette (FR); 1989	Trapette	Graminee (Selle Français)
