= Racecard =

Card containing horse racing information

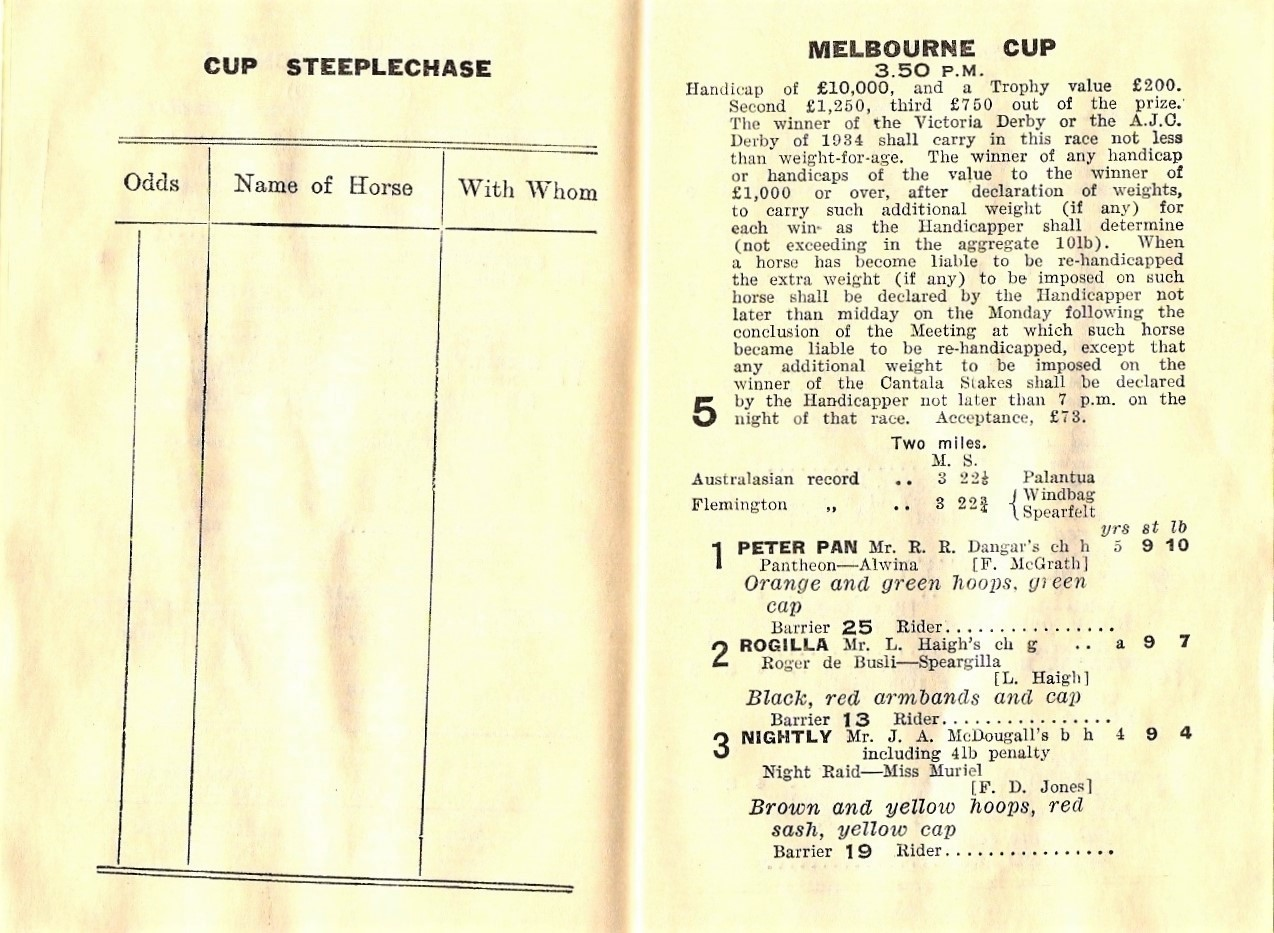
A race book showing race conditions and starters in a Melbourne Cup.

A racecard is a printed card used in horse racing giving information about races, principally the horses running in each particular race. Racecards are often given in newspapers. Also known as a race book (form guide in Australia), which in this case is a small booklet issued for use at a race meeting.

A typical racecard lists information not only about the horse's name, but also its age and the weight it has to carry in the race. The rider and trainer are listed, plus figures indicating the horse's recent form.

== Race ==
- Race name
- Time of race
- Prize money
- Distance
- Going

gd - good going
g/f - good to firm
fm - firm
g/s - good to soft
sft - soft going
hvy - heavy going
ap - all weather - polytrack
af - all weather - fibresand

- Status of race - the premier races are Class 1 (Flat racing) and Grade 1 (National Hunt racing)
- Number of runners

== Individual horses ==
- Position drawn in stalls
- Number horse is wearing (saddle cloth number)
- Form figures and previous races

Previous season's races are shown before a hyphen (-)
BD - brought down
CO - carried out
DNF - did not finish
F - fell
HR - hit rails
N/R - non-runner
P or PU - pulled up
RO - ran out
R - refused
RTR - refused to race
SU - slipped up
U or UR - unseated rider

- Horse name
- Horse's age
- Course/distance form

C = course winner
D = distance winner
BF = beaten favourite

- Weight
- Days since last ran

If the horse has recently run under a different code (either flat or jump) the days elapsed since that race are shown in brackets.

- Headgear

B = blinkers 1st time
b = blinkers, worn before
V = visor 1st time
v = visor, worn before
H = hood 1st time
h = hood, worn before
C = eye cover 1st time
c = eye cover, worn before
E = eye hood 1st time
e = eye hood, worn before
T = tongue strap 1st time
t = tongue strap, worn before

- Trainer
- Jockey
- Penalties & out of handicap

ex = penalty for recent win
oh = out of the handicap

- Jockey's colours
- Owner
