= First Gold =

French-bred Thoroughbred racehorse

- Sire: Shafoun
- Grandsire: Labus
- Dam: Nuit Dor
- Damsire: Pot Dor
- Sex: Gelding
- Foaled: 1993
- Country: France
- Colour: Seal brown
- Breeder: Roger Chaignon
- Owner: J. P. McManus
- Trainer: François Doumen
- Record: 46: 11-8-6
- Earnings: £885,101

Major wins
- King George VI Chase (2000)

First Gold (1993–2011) was a National Hunt racehorse that was trained by François Doumen.

The horse won the 2000 King George VI Chase race by a distance of 10 lengths when ridden by Thierry Doumen, beating Florida Pearl into second place. At the time of the win the horse was owned by the Marquesa de Moratalla.

After his King George VI success he was purchased by J. P. McManus, following which the horse won the Punchestown Gold Cup and the Martell Cognac Cup.

The horse was put down in January 2011 after suffering with laminitis.
