= Florida Pearl =

Irish-bred Thoroughbred racehorse

- Sire: Florida Son
- Dam: Ice Pearl
- Damsire: Flatbush
- Sex: Gelding
- Foaled: 1992
- Country: Ireland
- Colour: Bay
- Breeder: P. Mackean
- Owner: Mrs. Violet O'Leary
- Trainer: Willie Mullins
- Record: 33: 16-6-2
- Earnings: £882,781

Major wins
- Champion Bumper (1997); Dr P. J. Moriarty Memorial Novice Chase (1998); Royal & SunAlliance Chase (1998); Hennessy Gold Cup (Ireland) (1999, 2000, 2001, 2004); James Nicholson Wine Merchant Champion Chase (1999); John Durkan Memorial Chase (2001); King George VI Chase (2001); Betfair Bowl (2002); Punchestown Gold Cup (2002); Normans Grove Chase (2004)
- Last updated on December 5, 2008

Florida Pearl (1992–2012) was an Irish-bred race horse who raced in the late 1990s and early 2000s. He was owned by Mrs Violet O'Leary and trained by Willie Mullins. His major race successes included the Champion Bumper, Royal & SunAlliance Chase, King George VI Chase, and a record four Irish Hennessy's (Hennessy Gold Cup (Ireland)), among other races.

Florida Pearl made his debut when winning a 4YO Maiden at Lismore in March 1996. He did not reappear then until December of that year, where he followed up by winning a National Hunt Flat Race at Leopardstown. He was then stepped straight up to Grade 1 class for the 1997 Cheltenham Festival, where he won the Champion Bumper by five lengths in his final appearance of that season.

He reappeared in December 1997, where he won a Beginners Chase at Leopardstown. Following that, he was stepped up in class for the Grade 2 Dr.P.J. Moriarty Memorial Novice Chase, for which he was an odds on favourite and obliged with a 1-length victory over Boss Doyle. Following that victory, he was sent off the 11/8 favourite for the Royal & SunAlliance Chase, where he defied his relative inexperience over fences to record a 1½ length victory over Escartefigue, under Richard Dunwoody, maintaining his unbeaten record.

He made his first start of the 1998/99 season at Leopardstown in December in the Ericsson Chase, where he was sent off an odds-on favourite. Travelling strongly in the race, he made a mistake three out which resulted in him falling, leaving Doran's Pride to win. Despite this fall, he was still sent off an odds-on favourite for the Irish Hennessy in February 1999, where he recorded a 2-length victory over old rival Escarefigue. He was then sent off the 5/2 favourite for the 1999 Cheltenham Gold Cup under Richard Dunwoody, finishing a 17-length 3rd behind the winner, See More Business. Florida Pearl made his final appearance of that season in April in the Punchestown Gold Cup, where he was once again sent off the odds-on favourite and finished a 14-length 2nd to Imperial Call.

He began the 1999–00 season in the Grade 1 James Nicholson Wine Merchant Champion Chase, which he won from Doran's Pride by 2½ lengths. He then contested the Ericsson Chase for the second season in a row, where he again failed to justify odds-on favouritism when finishing 2nd to Rince Ri. He came back to Leopardstown to contest his first Handicap, where he only just defied top weight when running out a short winner from Amberleigh House. He then contested the Irish Hennessy for the 2nd successive season and was a 5½ length winner over old foe Doran's Pride. Florida Pearl came back to contest the Cheltenham Gold Cup, where he was sent off the 9/2 joint 2nd favourite behind the previous year's winner and favourite, See More Business (9/4). In a race which was marred by the subsequent death of the then-race leader Gloria Victis, Florida Pearl was unsuccessful in his bid to win the Cheltenham Gold Cup, finishing a 5-length second to fellow 9/2 joint favourite Looks Like Trouble.

In the 2000/01 season, Florida Pearl made five appearances, all at Grade 1 level. He had no luck in his first three races of the season, starting in the James Nicholson Wine Merchant Champion Chase, where he finished a distant fourth to reigning Cheltenham Gold Cup Champion Looks Like Trouble. He went on to be denied by a short head by Native Upmanship in the John Durkan Memorial Chase at Punchestown. Florida Pearl then made his first appearance at Kempton in the King George VI Chase, where he finished a 10-length 2nd to First Gold. He regained the winning thread, when winning the Irish Hennessy for the 3rd successive season, beating stablemate Alexander Banquet by 2 lengths. He was unable to run at the Cheltenham Festival because it was abandoned due to the 2001 UK foot and mouth crisis. In his final appearance of the season, Florida Pearl finished a 6-length 2nd to Moscow Express in the Powers Gold Cup at Fairyhouse.

The 2001/02 season proved to be a lot more successful for Florida Pearl, although it began with a 2½ length 3rd behind Foxchapel King in the James Nicholson Wine Merchant Champion Chase. He exacted revenge on Native Upmanship from the previous season with a short head win in the John Durkan Memorial Chase. Florida Pearl then returned to Kempton for the King George VI Chase in December, where he again exacted revenge on last year's winner, First Gold, with a 3/4 length victory over Best Mate. He went back to Leopardstown to contest the Irish Hennessy for the 4th successive season, where he was sent off the 6/4 favourite and finished a 25-length 4th behind the winner and stablemate Alexander Banquet. He went back to contest the 2002 Cheltenham Gold Cup, where he finished 11th of 18 behind the winner, Best Mate. He returned to England for his next start in the Grade 2 Martell Cup Chase, where he cruised to an 11-length victory over Cyfor Malta. He made one more successful appearance that season when winning the Punchestown Gold Cup by 3 lengths over Native Upmanship.

In 2002–03, Florida Pearl failed to get his head in front in five attempts. After being beaten a distance in the James Nicholson Wine Merchant Champion Chase and the King George VI Chase, behind More Than A Stroll and Best Mate respectively, he was pulled up in the race associated with him, the 2003 Irish Hennessy. He was then dropped down to 2 miles at the Cheltenham Festival and finished 8th of 11 behind Moscow Flyer in the Queen Mother Champion Chase. In his final start of the season, he finished fifth behind old foe First Gold in the Punchestown Gold Cup.

The following season, 2003–04, proved to be Florida Pearl's final season racing, and he only made two appearances on the racecourse. He began the season in January 2004, where he made a successful return to action at Fairyhouse in the Grade 3 Norman Grove Chase, running out a 2-length winner over Rince Ri. In his final race, Florida Pearl returned to Leopardstown to contest the Irish Hennessy one last time, where he was sent off the 5/1 fourth favourite in the betting under jockey, Richard Johnson. He defied these odds to win the race for the fourth time at the age of 12, with a 3-length victory over the 15/8 favourite, Le Coudray.

Florida Pearl was euthanised on 5 May 2012 due to a rare condition linked to a malignant cancer.
