= Form (horse racing) =

Record of events for a race horse

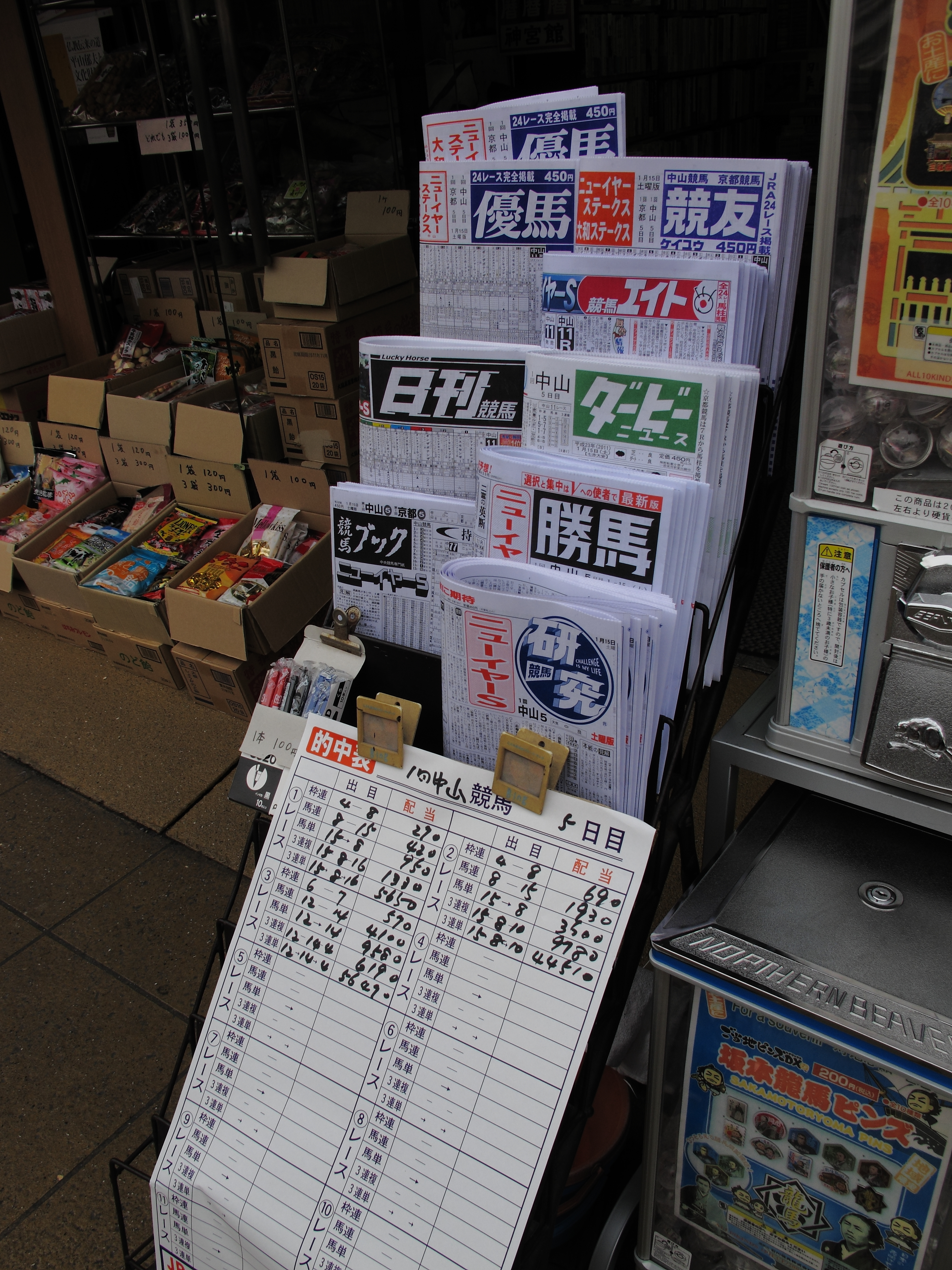
Racing form sold in Japan

In horse racing, the form of a horse is a record of significant events, mainly its performance in previous races. The form may identify the horse's sire, dam and wider pedigree. It is used by tipsters and punters as an aid in the prediction of its performance in future races.

A typical way of showing a horse's form, as published in newspapers and other media, is shown here.

Number	Colours	Form	Horse Name	Age	Weight	Trainer	Jockey
3	image	43-2F1	Mill Reff	3	11-12	A. Smith	L. Piggott
7	image	680U54	Glue Pot	3	11-10	B. Brown	F. Dettori

Abbreviations used to decode the Form column can include:

1–9	The position the horse finished in a race
0	Finished outside the top 9
P	Pulled up (reined in as horse may be too tired/injured, or horse may just stop running)
F	Fell
S	Slipped Up
R	Refusal
B	Brought down
U	Unseated rider
-	Separates years, i.e. left of this is from previous year, e.g. Dec 06 - Jan 07
/	Separates racing seasons, i.e. left of this is from the season before last
BD	Indicates the horse was brought down by another runner
BF	Stands for the beaten favourite and indicates a horse was favourite for a race but did not win
CD	Indicates a horse has won over course and distance

Form is arranged chronologically from left (oldest) to right (newest).

So, in the example above, the horse Mill Reef gained a fourth place, followed by a third, then took some time out from racing, then gained a second followed by falling in the next race, and its latest result was a win.

== See also ==
- Racecard
