= John Durkan Memorial Punchestown Chase =

Steeplechase horse race in Ireland

John Durkan Memorial Punchestown Chase
2025
Gaelic Warrior	Fact To File	Fastorslow

Previous years
2024
Fact To File	Spillane's Tower	Galopin Des Champs
2023
Fastorslow	Appreciate It	Galopin Des Champs
2022
Galopin Des Champs	Fakir D'Oudairies	Lifetime Ambition
2021
Allaho	Janidil	Melon

2020-2011
2020
Min	Tornado Flyer	Melon
2019
Min	Hardline	Presenting Percy
2018
Min	Shattered Love	Balko Des Flos
2017
Sizing John	Djakadam	Sub Lieutenant
2016
Djakadam	Outlander	Sub Lieutenant
2015
Djakadam	Valseur Lido	Gilgamboa
2014
Don Cossack	Boston Bob	Lord Windermere
2013
Arvika Ligeonniere	Rubi Light	Only two finished
2012
Flemenstar	Sir Des Champs	Rubi Light
2011
Rubi Light	Joncol	Cooldine

2010-2001
2010
Tranquil Sea	J'y Vole	Roberto Goldback
2009
Joncol	In Compliance	J'y Vole
2008
Noland	The Listener	War Of Attrition
2007
The Listener	Mansony	One Cool Cookie
2006
In Compliance	War Of Attrition	Sher Beau
2005
Hi Cloy	Jim	Forget The Past
2004
Kicking King	Rathgar Beau	Beef Or Salmon
2003
Beef Or Salmon	Tiutchev	Rince Ri
2002
Native Upmanship	Rince Ri	First Gold
2001
Florida Pearl	Native Upmanship	Sackville

2000-1991
2000
Native Upmanship	Florida Pearl	Micko's Dream
1999
Buck Rogers	Rince Ri	His Song
1998
Imperial Call	Dorans Pride	Bob Treacy
1997
Dorans Pride	Jeffell	Merry Gale
1996
Royal Mountbrowne	Merry Gale	Time For A Run
1995
Merry Gale	King Of The Gales	Brockley Court
1994
Merry Gale	Nuaffe	Monsieur Le Cure
1993
Cahervillahow	General Idea	Haki Saki
1992
Gold Options	General Idea	Garamycin
1991
Garamycin	Feroda	Laura's Beau

1990-1989
1990
Carvill's Hill	Larchmont	Feltrim Hill Lad
1989
Maid Of Money	Carvill's Hill	Super Furrow

The John Durkan Memorial Chase is a Grade 1 National Hunt steeplechase in Ireland. It is run over a distance of about 2 miles and 4 furlongs {2 miles 4 furlongs and 40 yards, or 4,060 metres) at Punchestown in December.

The race was first run in 1968 and it was run over a distance of 2 miles until 1973. It has been run over the present distance since then apart from in 1993 and 1994, when it was run over 2 miles and 5 furlongs. The race was renamed in December 1998 in memory of John Durkan (1967-1998), an amateur jockey and assistant racehorse trainer who died of leukemia in January 1998.

== Records ==
- Most successful horse (3 wins):
- Min - 2018, 2019, 2020

Most successful jockey (4 wins):

- Ruby Walsh - Arvika Ligeonniere (2013), Djakadam (2015, 2016), Min (2018)

Most successful trainer (12 wins):

- Willie Mullins - Florida Pearl (2001), Arvika Ligeonniere (2013), Djakadam (2015, 2016), Min (2018, 2019, 2020), Allaho (2021), Galopin Des Champs (2022), Fact To File (2024), Gaelic Warrior (2025), Final Demand (2026)

== Winners ==
Year	Winner	Age	Jockey	Trainer
1968	Bold Fencer	7	Joe Crowley	A S O'Brien
1969	Kinloch Brae	6	Timmy Hyde	Willie O'Grady
1970	East Bound		Sean Barker	Tom Dreaper
1971	Straight Fort	8	Eddie Wright	Jim Dreaper
1972	Straight Fort	9	Eddie Wright	Jim Dreaper
1973	Lean Forward	7	P McLoughlin	Jim Dreaper
1974	Lough Inagh	7	Sean Barker	Jim Dreaper
1975	Captain Christy	8	Bobby Coonan	Pat Taaffe
1976	Fort Fox		Frank Berry	J R Cox
1977	Fort Fox		Thomas McGivern	J R Cox
1978	Jack Of Trumps	5	Mr. Niall Madden Sr.	Edward O'Grady
1979	Jack Of Trumps	6	Mr. Niall Madden Sr.	Edward O'Grady
1980	Chinrullah	8	Mr. Niall Madden Sr.	Mick O'Toole
1981	Tacroy	7	Tommy Carmody	Michael O'Brien
1982	Chorelli	9	P Walsh	Michael O'Brien
1983	Ballinacurra Lad	8	P Leech	John Fowler
1984	Bobsline	8	Frank Berry	Francis Flood
1985	Dawn Run	7	Anthony Mullins	Paddy Mullins
1986	Bobsline	10	Frank Berry	Francis Flood
1987	Excursion		John Queally (Note: amateur jockey)	G Stewart
1988	Hungary Hur	9	Tommy Carmody	John Mulhern
1989	Maid Of Money	7	Anthony Powell	John Fowler
1990	Carvill's Hill	8	Kevin Morgan	Jim Dreaper
1991	Garamycin	9	Brendan Sheridan	Willie Deacon
1992	Gold Options	10	Mark Dwyer	Peter McCreery
1993	Cahervillahow	9	Norman Williamson	Mouse Morris
1994	Merry Gale	6	Kevin O'Brien	Jim Dreaper
1995	Merry Gale	7	Richard Dunwoody	Jim Dreaper
1996	Royal Mountbrowne	8	Charlie Swan	Aidan O'Brien
1997	Dorans Pride (Note: The 1997 running took place at Fairyhouse as the Hot Power Chase)	8	Richard Dunwoody	Michael Hourigan
1998	Imperial Call	9	Paul Carberry	Raymond Hurley
1999	Buck Rogers	10	Ken Whelan	Victor Bowens
2000	Native Upmanship	7	Conor O'Dwyer	Arthur Moore
2001	Florida Pearl	9	Paul Carberry	Willie Mullins
2002	Native Upmanship	9	Conor O'Dwyer	Arthur Moore
2003	Beef or Salmon	7	Timmy Murphy	Michael Hourigan
2004	Kicking King	6	Barry Geraghty	Tom Taaffe
2005	Hi Cloy	8	Andrew McNamara	Michael Hourigan
2006	In Compliance	6	Barry Geraghty	Michael O'Brien
2007	The Listener	8	Daryl Jacob	Robert Alner
2008	Noland	7	Sam Thomas	Paul Nicholls
2009	Joncol	6	Alain Cawley	Paul Nolan
2010	Tranquil Sea (Note: The 2010 running took place at Fairyhouse)	8	Andrew McNamara	Edward O'Grady
2011	Rubi Light	6	Andrew Lynch	Robert Alan Hennessy
2012	Flemenstar	7	Andrew Lynch	Peter Casey
2013	Arvika Ligeonniere	8	Ruby Walsh	Willie Mullins
2014	Don Cossack	7	Brian O'Connell	Gordon Elliott
2015	Djakadam	6	Ruby Walsh	Willie Mullins
2016	Djakadam	7	Ruby Walsh	Willie Mullins
2017	Sizing John	7	Robbie Power	Jessica Harrington
2018	Min	7	Ruby Walsh	Willie Mullins
2019	Min	8	Paul Townend	Willie Mullins
2020	Min	9	Patrick Mullins	Willie Mullins
2021	Allaho	7	Patrick Mullins	Willie Mullins
2022	Galopin Des Champs	6	Paul Townend	Willie Mullins
2023	Fastorslow	7	JJ Slevin	Martin Brassil
2024	Fact To File	7	Mark Walsh	Willie Mullins
2025	Gaelic Warrior	7	Paul Townend	Willie Mullins
2026	Final Demand	7	Patrick Mullins	Willie Mullins

== See also ==
- Horse racing in Ireland
- List of Irish National Hunt races
