= Golden Miller Novices' Limited Handicap Chase =

Steeplechase horse race in Britain

Golden Miller Novices' Limited Handicap Chase Jack Richards Novices' Limited Handicap Chase
- Class: Grade Two
- Location: Cheltenham Racecourse; Cheltenham, England
- Inaugurated: 2011
- Race type: Chase
- Sponsor: Jack Richards & Son
- Website: Cheltenham

Race information
- Distance: 2m 4f 127y (4,139 metres)
- Surface: Turf
- Track: Left-handed
- Qualification: Five-years-old and up
- Weight: Handicap; Maximum: 11 st 12 lb
- Purse: £125,000 (2025); 1st: £64,300

Golden Miller Novices' Limited Handicap Chase
2024
Grey Dawning	Ginny's Destiny	Djelo

Previous years
2023
Stage Star	Notlongtillmay	Mighty Potter
2022
Bob Olinger	Busselton	El Barra
2021
Chantry House	Fusil Raffles	Asterion Forlonge

2020-2011
2020
Samcro	Melon	Faugheen
2019
Defi Du Seuil	Lostintranslation	Mengli Khan
2018
Shattered Love	Terrefort	Benatar
2017
Yorkhill	Top Notch	Disko
2016
Black Hercules	Bristol De Mai	L'Ami Serge
2015
Vautour	Apache Stronghold	Valseur Lido
2014
Taquin Du Seuil	Uxizandre	Double Ross
2013
Benefficient	Dynaste	Changing Times
2012
Sir Des Champs	Champion Court	For Non Stop
2011
Noble Prince	Wishfull Thinking	Loosen My Load

The Golden Miller Novices' Limited Handicap Chase, currently known for sponsorship purposes as the Jack Richards Novices' Limited Handicap Chase, is a Grade Two National Hunt limited handicap chase in Great Britain which is open to horses aged five years or older. It is run on the New Course at Cheltenham over a distance of about 2 miles and 4½ furlongs (2 miles 4 furlongs and 127 yards, or 4,139 metres), and during its running there are seventeen fences to be jumped. It is a race for novice chasers and it is scheduled to take place each year on the third day of the Cheltenham Festival in March.

The race was initially sponsored by Jewson and was established in 2011 as a new Grade 2 race at the Festival. Jewson had sponsored a handicap race for novice chasers from 2005 to 2010, the Jewson Novices' Handicap Chase, which was run on the third day of the Festival. Jewson transferred their sponsorship to this new race at the 2011 Festival which took the place of the Novices' Handicap Chase on the third day, while the handicap race was moved to become the final race on the opening day of the Festival and retitled the Centenary Novices' Handicap Chase. The Jewson Novices' Chase was upgraded to Grade One by the British Horseracing Board from its 2014 running. The race's registered unsponsored title is the Golden Miller Novices' Chase, although it has always been run under sponsored titles.

The race was sponsored by insurance brokers JLT from 2014 until 2019. The JLT group had already been associated with sponsorship of a festival race, having sponsored the Festival Trophy Handicap Chase since 2012. The race was renamed the Marsh Novices' Chase from the 2020 renewal following the merger of JLT and Marsh. The transport company Turners took over the sponsorship from the 2022 running.

After the 2024 running, it was announced that the Golden Miller would become a Grade 2 Novices' Limited Handicap Chase, remaining on the same day but moving to be the second race of the day. Turners moved its sponsorship to a different race and Jack Richards became the new sponsors from 2025.

== Records ==
Leading jockey (3 wins):

- Ruby Walsh – Vautour (2015), Black Hercules (2016), Yorkhill (2017)

Leading trainer (4 wins):

- Willie Mullins – Sir Des Champs (2012), Vautour (2015), Black Hercules (2016), Yorkhill (2017)

== Winners ==
Year	Winner	Age	Jockey	Trainer
2011	Noble Prince	7	Tony McCoy	Paul Nolan
2012	Sir Des Champs	6	Davy Russell	Willie Mullins
2013	Benefficient	7	Bryan Cooper	Tony Martin
2014	Taquin du Seuil	7	Tony McCoy	Jonjo O'Neill
2015	Vautour	6	Ruby Walsh	Willie Mullins
2016	Black Hercules	7	Ruby Walsh	Willie Mullins
2017	Yorkhill	7	Ruby Walsh	Willie Mullins
2018	Shattered Love	7	Jack Kennedy	Gordon Elliott
2019	Defi du Seuil	6	Barry Geraghty	Philip Hobbs
2020	Samcro	8	Davy Russell	Gordon Elliott
2021	Chantry House	7	Nico de Boinville	Nicky Henderson
2022	Bob Olinger	7	Rachael Blackmore	Henry de Bromhead
2023	Stage Star	7	Harry Cobden	Paul Nicholls
2024	Grey Dawning	7	Harry Skelton	Dan Skelton
2025	Caldwell Potter	7	Harry Cobden	Paul Nicholls
2026	Meetmebythesea	6	Ben Jones	Ben Pauling

== See also ==
- Horse racing in Great Britain
- List of British National Hunt races
