= Willie Mullins =

Irish horseracing trainer (born 1956)

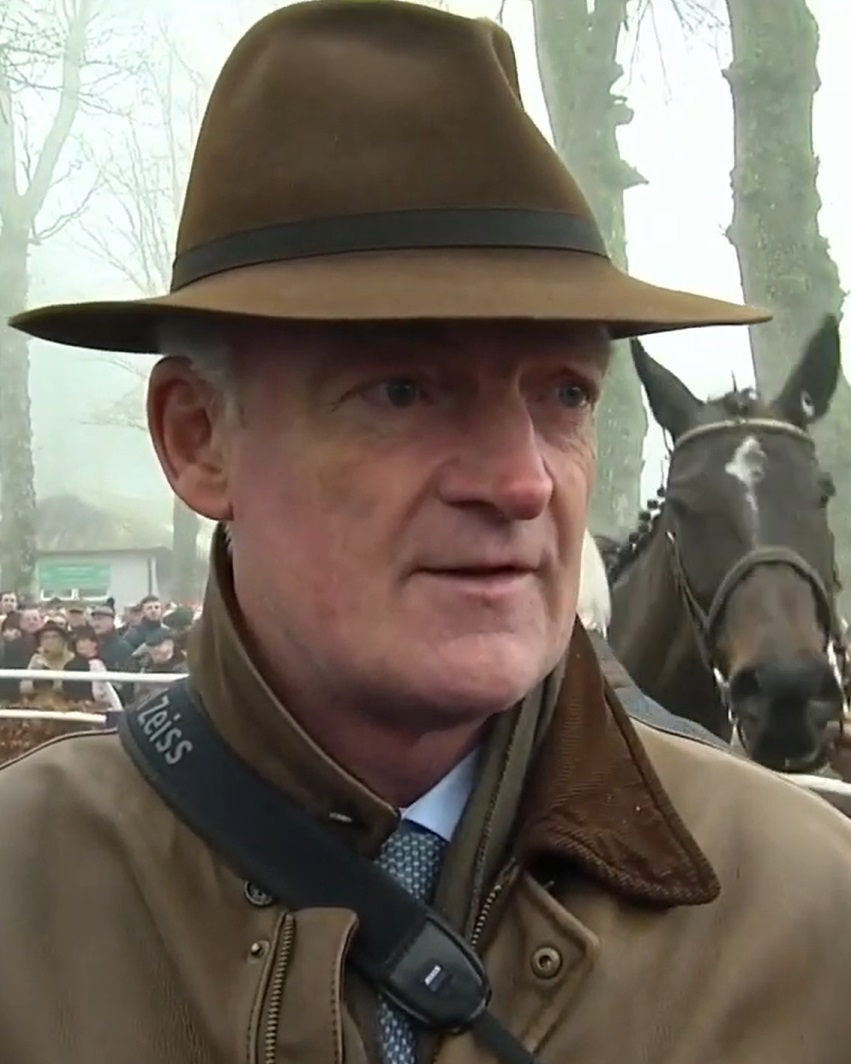
- Mullins at Gowran Park, 2020

Personal information
- Born: 15 September 1956 (age 70) Goresbridge, County Kilkenny, Ireland
- Occupation: Trainer

Horse racing career
- Sport: Horse racing
- Career wins: 500 + (as a jockey), 4000 + (as a trainer)

Major racing wins
- As a steeplechase jockey: 1983 Aintree Fox Hunters' Chase (1983) As a trainer in English steeplechasing: Cheltenham Gold Cup (2019, 20, 23, 24, 26); Champion Hurdle (2011, 13, 15, 16, 24, 26); Queen Mother Champion Chase (2022, 23, 26); Stayers' Hurdle ( 2017, 18); Grand National (2005, 24, 25, 26); King George VI Chase (2001, 2021)

Racing awards
- British jump racing Champion Trainer (2), Irish National Hunt Champion trainer (19)

William Peter Mullins (born 15 September 1956) is an Irish racehorse trainer and former jockey. He is a nineteen-time Irish National Hunt Champion trainer. Mullins is the most successful trainer in the history of the Cheltenham Festival, having saddled 121 winners as of 2026. He was the trainer of I Am Maximus, winner of the 2024 Grand National and 2026 Grand National, and of Nick Rockett, winner of the 2025 Grand National.

== Personal life ==
Mullins was born and raised around horses. His father, Paddy Mullins, was a horse trainer, and his mother, Maureen, was a successful breeder.

Mullins is from Goresbridge, County Kilkenny, but is based at Closutton, Bagenalstown, County Carlow, Ireland. He was educated at Cistercian College, Roscrea, an all-boys Catholic boarding school in County Tipperary.

His son, Patrick Mullins, is an amateur jockey riding mainly in Ireland for his father and acting as assistant trainer to him. Patrick rode Nick Rockett to the 2025 Randox Grand National title. Mullins' wife, Jackie, was a successful amateur rider. With his wife, he was invited to ride in the King's procession at Royal Ascot 2023.

== Career ==
Mullins commenced racehorse training in 1988, having previously worked as an assistant to his father and Jim Bolger. He is a former six-time amateur champion jockey in Ireland, winning the 1983 Aintree Fox Hunters' Chase on Atha Cliath and the 1996 Cheltenham Bumper on Wither Or Which.

He is the trainer of the 2005 Grand National winner Hedgehunter and the 2011 and 2013 Champion Hurdle winner Hurricane Fly. Mullins also trained Vautour in the 2016 Ryanair Chase. He is also trainer of the six-time David Nicholson Mares' Hurdle champion, Quevega. In the 2015 Cheltenham Festival Mullins trained eight winners, a joint record at the Cheltenham Festival which Gordon Elliott equalled in 2018. He is the leading-most winning trainer at the Cheltenham Festival, becoming the first trainer to saddle 100 winners when Jasmin De Vaux won the 2024 Champion Bumper. In 2022 he trained a new record of ten winners at the festival.

Mullins' longlasting relationship with Gigginstown House Stud came to an end on 28 September 2016. Despite this he was the Irish Champion trainer in the 2016/17 season.

Mullins has won both the Grand National in 2005 with Hedgehunter and the 2019 Irish Grand National with Burrows Saint, each of which was ridden by Ruby Walsh. In the 2022/23 season he became Irish National Hunt Champion trainer for the 17th time.

Mullins won the British jump racing Champion Trainer title in the 2023–24 season, becoming the first trainer based in Ireland to win the championship since Vincent O'Brien in 1954. He successfully defended his title in 2024–25, beating long-time leader Dan Skelton on the last afternoon of the National Hunt season.

== Cheltenham Festival winners (121) ==
- Cheltenham Gold Cup - (5) Al Boum Photo (2019, 2020), Galopin Des Champs (2023, 2024), Gaelic Warrior (2026)
- Champion Hurdle - (6) Hurricane Fly (2011, 2013), Faugheen (2015), Annie Power (2016), State Man (2024), Lossiemouth (2026)
- Queen Mother Champion Chase - (3) Energumene (2022, 2023), Il Etait Temps (2026)
- Stayers' Hurdle - (2) Nichols Canyon (2017), Penhill (2018)
- Supreme Novices' Hurdle - (8) Tourist Attraction (1995), Ebaziyan (2007), Champagne Fever (2013), Vautour (2014), Douvan (2015), Klassical Dream (2019), Appreciate It (2021), Kopek Des Bordes (2025)
- Arkle Challenge Trophy - (7) Un de Sceaux (2015), Douvan (2016), Footpad (2018), Duc des Genievres (2019), El Fabiolo (2023), Gaelic Warrior (2024), Kargese (2026)
- David Nicholson Mares' Hurdle - (11) Quevega (2009, 2010, 2011, 2012, 2013, 2014), Glens Melody (2015), Vroum Vroum Mag (2016), Benie Des Dieux (2018), Lossiemouth (2024, 2025)
- Baring Bingham Novices' Hurdle - (8) Fiveforthree (2008), Mikael d'Haguenet (2009), Faugheen (2014), Yorkhill (2016), Sir Gerhard (2022), Impaire Et Passe (2023), Ballyburn (2024), King Rasko Grey (2026)
- Broadway Novices' Chase - (8) Florida Pearl (1998), Rule Supreme (2004), Cooldine (2009), Don Poli (2015), Monkfish (2021), Fact To File (2024), Lecky Watson (2025), Kitzbuhel (2026)
- Champion Bumper - (14) Wither or Which (1996), Florida Pearl (1997), Alexander Banquet (1998), Joe Cullen (2000), Missed That (2005), Cousin Vinny (2008), Champagne Fever (2012), Briar Hill (2013), Relegate (2018), Ferny Hollow (2020), Sir Gerhard (2021), Facile Vega (2022), Jasmin De Vaux (2024), Bambino Fever (2025)
- Spa Novices' Hurdle - (4) Penhill (2017), Monkfish (2020), The Nice Guy (2022), Jasmin De Vaux (2025)
- Ryanair Chase - (6) Vautour (2016), Un de Sceaux (2017), Min (2020), Allaho (2021, 2022), Fact To File (2025)
- Triumph Hurdle - (7) Scolardy (2002), Burning Victory (2020), Vauban (2022), Lossiemouth (2023), Majborough (2024), Poniros (2025), Apolon De Charnie (2026)
- Dawn Run Mares' Novices' Hurdle - (5) Limini (2016), Let's Dance (2017), Laurina (2018), Eglantine Du Seuil (2019), Concertista (2020)
- National Hunt Chase Challenge Cup - (4) Back in Focus (2013), Rathvinden (2018), Stattler (2022), Gaillard Du Mesnil (2023)
- Martin Pipe Conditional Jockeys' Handicap Hurdle - (4) Sir Des Champs (2011), Don Poli (2014), Killultagh Vic (2015), Galopin Des Champs (2021)
- Coral Cup - (2) Bleu Berry (2018), Jimmy Du Seuil (2025)
- County Handicap Hurdle - (8) Thousand Stars (2010), Final Approach (2011), Wicklow Brave (2015), Arctic Fire (2017), Saint Roi (2020), State Man (2022), Absurde (2024), Kargese (2025)
- Golden Miller Novices' Chase - (4) Sir Des Champs (2012), Vautour (2015), Black Hercules (2016), Yorkhill (2017)
- Liberthine Mares' Chase - (4) Colreevy (2021), Elimay (2022), Dinoblue (2025, 2026)
- St James's Place Festival Hunter Chase - (1) Billaway (2022)

== Other major wins ==
(Republic of Ireland) Ireland

- Irish Gold Cup - (15) Florida Pearl (1999, 2000, 2001, 2004), Alexander Banquet (2002), Rule Supreme (2005), Kempes (2011), Quel Esprit (2012), Sir Des Champs (2013), Bellshill (2019), Kemboy (2021), Galopin Des Champs (2023, 2024, 2025), Fact To File (2026)
- Punchestown Gold Cup - (8) Florida Pearl (2002), Sir Des Champs (2013), Boston Bob (2014), Bellshill (2018), Kemboy (2019), Allaho (2022), Galopin Des Champs (2025), Gaelic Warrior (2026)
- Irish St. Leger - (1) Wicklow Brave (2016)
- Irish Champion Hurdle - (9) Hurricane Fly (2011, 2012, 2013, 2014, 2015), Faugheen (2016), State Man (2023, 2024, 2025)
- Punchestown Champion Hurdle - (12) Davenport Milenium (2002), Hurricane Fly (2010, 2011, 2012, 2013), Faugheen (2015), Vroum Vroum Mag (2016), Wicklow Brave (2017), State Man (2023, 2024, 2025), Lossiemouth (2026)
- Punchestown Champion Chase - (9) Micko's Dream (2001), Golden Silver (2010), Felix Yonger (2015), Un de Sceaux (2018, 2019), Chacun Pour Soi (2021), Energumene (2022, 2023), Il Etait Temps (2026)
- Champion Stayers Hurdle - (10) Holy Orders (2003), Fiveforthree (2009), Quevega (2010, 2011, 2012, 2013), Faugheen (2018), Klassical Dream (2021, 2022, 2023)
- Champion INH Flat Race - (13) Maringo (1995), Cousin Vinny (2008), Lovethehigherlaw (2011), Champagne Fever (2012), Shaneshill (2014), Bellshill (2015), Blow By Blow (2016), Tornado Flyer (2018), Colreevy (2019), Kilcruit (2021), Facile Vega (2022), Redemption Day (2024), Bambino Fever (2025)
- Herald Champion Novice Hurdle - (11) Hurricane Fly (2009), Blackstairmountain (2010), Faugheen (2014), Douvan (2015), Cilaos Emery (2017), Draconien (2018), Klassical Dream (2019), Echoes in Rain (2021), Facile Vega (2023), Mystical Power (2024), Irancy (2025)
- Barberstown Castle Novice Chase - (13) Barker (2009), Arvika Ligeonniere (2013), Un de Sceaux (2015), Douvan (2016), Great Field (2017), Footpad (2018), Chacun Pour Soi (2019), Energumene (2021), Blue Lord (2022), El Fabiolo (2023), Il Etait Temps (2024), Majborough (2025), Salvator Mundi (2026)
- Alanna Homes Champion Novice Hurdle - (15) Davenport Milenium (2002), Nobody Told Me (2003), Sadlers Wings (2004), Glencove Marina (2007), Mikael d'Haguenet (2009), Un Atout (2013), Vautour (2014), Nichols Canyon (2015), Bacardys (2017), Gaillard Du Mesnil (2021), State Man (2022), Impaire Et Passe (2023), Ballyburn (2024), Final Demand (2025), King Rasko Grey (2026)
- Champion Four Year Old Hurdle - (11) Holy Order (2001), Quatre Heures (2006), Diakali (2013), Abbyssial (2014), Petite Parisienne (2015), Apple's Jade (2016), Bapaume (2017), Saldier (2018), Vauban (2022), Lossiemouth (2023), Kargese (2024)
- Channor Group Novice Hurdle - (10) The Midnight Club (2009), Marasonnien (2012), Killultagh Vic (2015), Bellshill (2016), Next Destination (2018), Galopin Des Champs (2021), The Nice Guy (2022), Gaelic Warrior (2023), Dancing City (2024), Jasmin De Vaux (2025)
- Mares Champion Hurdle - (11) Tarla (2010), Glens Melody (2013), Annie Power (2014, 2015), Whiteout (2016), Benie Des Dieux (2018, 2019), Stormy Ireland (2021), Echoes In Rain (2023), Lossiemouth (2024), Jade De Grugy (2025)
- Morgiana Hurdle - (15) Padashpan (1993), Thousand Stars (2011), Hurricane Fly (2012, 2013, 2014), Nichols Canyon (2015, 2016), Faugheen (2017), Sharjah (2018, 2021), Saldier (2019), State Man (2022, 2023), Lossiemouth (2025, 2026)
- Royal Bond Novice Hurdle - (10) Alexander Banquet (1998), Hurricane Fly (2008), Zaidpour (2010), Sous les Cieux (2011), Nichols Canyon (2014), Long Dog (2015), Airlie Beach (2016), Quick Grabim (2018), Statuaire (2021), Tounsivator (2024)
- Drinmore Novice Chase - (4) Alexander Banquet (1999), Arvika Ligeonniere (2012), Valseur Lido (2014), I Am Maximus (2023)
- Hatton's Grace Hurdle - (4) Hurricane Fly (2010), Zaidpour (2012), Arctic Fire (2015), Lossiemouth (2024)
- John Durkan Memorial Punchestown Chase - (12) Florida Pearl (2001), Arvika Ligeonniere (2013), Djakadam (2015, 2016), Min (2018, 2019, 2020), Allaho (2021), Galopin Des Champs (2022), Fact To File (2024), Gaelic Warrior (2025), Final Demand (2026)
- Racing Post Novice Chase - (9) Missed That (2005), Blackstairmountain (2011), Arvika Ligeonniere (2012), Douvan (2015), Min (2016), Footpad (2017), Franco De Port (2020), Ferny Hollow (2021), Saint Roi (2022)
- Paddy Power Dial-A-Bet Chase - (6) Golden Silver (2009), Twinlight (2014), Douvan (2016), Chacun Pour Soi (2020), Blue Lord (2022), Dinoblue (2023)
- Paddy Power Future Champions Novice Hurdle - (7) Hurricane Fly (2008), Long Dog (2015), Saturnas (2016), Whiskey Sour (2017), Aramon (2018), Appreciate It (2020), Facile Vega (2022)
- Christmas Hurdle - (4) Mourad (2010), Zaidpour (2013), Vroum Vroum Mag (2016), Klassical Dream (2021)
- Savills Chase - (4) Don Poli (2015), Kemboy (2018), Galopin Des Champs (2023, 2024)
- December Hurdle - (12) Hurricane Fly (2010, 2012, 2013, 2014), Nichols Canyon (2015), Sharjah (2018, 2019, 2020, 2021), State Man (2022, 2023), Lossiemouth (2025)
- Fort Leney Novice Chase - (5) Back In Focus (2012), Don Poli (2014), Monkfish (2020), Gaillard Du Mesnil (2022), Grangeclare West (2023)
- Faugheen Novice Chase - (10) Financial Reward (2008), Sir Des Champs (2011), The Paparrazi Kid (2013), Outlander (2015), Bellshill (2016), Faugheen (2019), Colreevy (2020), Gaelic Warrior (2023), Impaire Et Passe (2024), Final Demand (2025)
- Slaney Novice Hurdle - (9) Homer Wells (2005), Mikael D'haguenet (2009), Gagewell Flyer (2011), Briar Hill (2014), Mckinley (2015), Bellshill (2016), Next Destination (2018), Champ Kiely (2023), Readin Tommy Wrong (2024)
- Arkle Novice Chase - (11) Assessed (2002), Missed That (2006), Golden Silver (2009), Un de Sceaux (2015), Douvan (2016), Footpad (2018), Energumene (2021), Blue Lord (2022), El Fabiolo (2023), Il Etait Temps (2024), Majborough (2025)
- Dublin Chase - (8) Min (2018, 2019), Chaucun Pour Soi (2020, 2021, 2022), Gentleman De Mee (2023), El Fabiolo (2024), Majborough (2026)
- Golden Cygnet Novice Hurdle - (11) Boston Bob (2012), Pont Alexandre (2013), Sure Reef (2014), Outlander (2015), A Toi Phil (2016), Let's Dance (2017), Gaillard Du Mesnil (2021), Minella Cocooner (2022), Dancing City (2024), Final Demand (2025), Doctor Steinberg (2026)
- Spring Juvenile Hurdle - (8) Mister Hight (2006) Petite Parisienne (2015), Footpad (2016), Mr Adjudicator (2018), Vauban (2022), Gala Marceau (2023), Kargese (2024), Narciso Has (2026)
- Chanelle Pharma Novice Hurdle - (13) Alexander Banquet (1999), Champagne Fever (2013), Vautour (2014), Nichols Canyon (2015), Bleu Et Rouge (2016), Bacardys (2017), Klassical Dream (2019), Asterion Forlonge (2020), Appreciate It (2021), Sir Gerhard (2022), Il Etait Temps (2023), Ballyburn (2024), Kopek Des Bordes (2025)
- Dr P. J. Moriarty Novice Chase - (13) Florida Pearl (1998), J'y Vole (2008), Cooldine (2009), Citizen Vic (2010), Boston Bob (2013), Ballycasey (2014), Outlander (2016), Faugheen (2020), Monkfish (2021), Galopin Des Champs (2022), Fact To File (2024), Ballyburn (2025), Kaid d'Authie (2026)
- Mares Novice Hurdle Championship Final - (9) Nobody Told Me (2003), Annie Power (2013), Adriana Des Mottes (2014), Augusta Kate (2017), Laurina (2018), Brandy Love (2022), Ashroe Diamond (2023), Jade De Grugy (2024), Aurora Vega (2025)
- Boylesports Gold Cup - (6) Al Boum Photo (2018), Voix Du Reve (2019), Janidil (2021), Galopin Des Champs (2022), Flame Bearer (2023), Spindleberry (2025)
- Dooley Insurance Group Champion Novice Chase - (6) Kempes (2010), Sir Des Champs (2012), Valseur Lido (2015), Colreevy (2021), Capodanno (2022), Champ Kiely (2025)
- Ladbrokes Champion Chase - (1) Florida Pearl (1999)

Saudi Arabia

- Neom Turf Cup - (1) True Self (2021)

Australia

- Queen Elizabeth Stakes - (2) True Self (2019, 2020)

(United Kingdom) Great Britain

- Grand National - (4) Hedgehunter (2005), I Am Maximus (2024, 2026), Nick Rockett (2025)
- King George VI Chase - (2) Florida Pearl (2001), Tornado Flyer (2021)
- Tingle Creek Chase - (2) Un de Sceaux (2016), Il Etait Temps (2025)
- Christmas Hurdle - (2) Faugheen (2014, 2015)
- Tolworth Hurdle - (1) Yorkhill (2016)
- Clarence House Chase - (3) Un de Sceaux (2016, 2017, 2018)
- Scilly Isles Novices' Chase - (1) Gitane Du Berlais (2015)
- Anniversary 4-Y-O Novices' Hurdle - (3) Apple's Jade (2016), Zenta (2023), Murcia (2025)
- Betway Bowl - (3) Florida Pearl (2002), Kemboy (2019), Gaelic Warrior (2025)
- Aintree Hurdle - (3) Annie Power (2016), Impaire Et Passe (2024), Lossiemouth (2025)
- Melling Chase - (2) Boston Bob (2014), Min (2019)
- Mersey Novices' Hurdle - (2) Nichols Canyon (2015), Yorkhill (2016)
- Maghull Novices' Chase - (2) Douvan (2016), Gentleman De Mee (2022)
- Mildmay Novices' Chase - (1) Gold Dancer (2026)
- Manifesto Novices' Chase - (2) Il Etait Temps (2024), Impaire Et Passe (2025)
- Sefton Novices' Hurdle - (1) Dancing City (2024)
- Top Novices' Hurdle - (2) - Mystical Power (2024), Salvator Mundi (2025)
- Celebration Chase - (1) - Il Etait Temps (2025)
- Kauto Star Novices' Chase - (1) Kitzbuhel (2025)

United States

- Peapack Hurdle Stakes - (1) Pravalaguna (2019)
- Iroquois Steeplechase – (1) Scaramanga (2023)
- Breeders' Cup Turf - (1) Ethical Diamond (2025)

France

- Grande Course de Haies d'Auteuil - (5) Nobody Told Me (2003), Rule Supreme (2004), Thousand Stars (2011, 2012), Benie des Dieux (2019)
- Prix Alain du Breil - (4) Diakali (2013), Footpad (2016), Gala Marceau (2023), Selma De Vary (2026)
- Grand Prix d'Automne - (1) Thousand Stars (2015)

Japan

- Nakayama Grand Jump - (1) Blackstairmountain (2013)

== Major wins as a jockey ==
(Republic of Ireland) Ireland

- December Festival Hurdle - (1) Grabel (1988)

(United Kingdom) Great Britain

- Champion Bumper - (1) Wither or Which (1996)
