= Grande Course de Haies d'Auteuil =

Grande Course de Haies d'Auteuil (French Champion Hurdle)
- Class: Group 1
- Location: Auteuil Racecourse; Paris, France
- Inaugurated: 1874
- Race type: Hurdle race
- Website: france-galop.com

Race information
- Distance: 5,100 metres (3m 1½f)
- Surface: Turf
- Track: Left-handed
- Qualification: Five-years-old and up
- Weight: 65 kg (5yo); 67 kg (6yo+); Allowances; 2 kg for mares
- Purse: €350,000 (2021); Distribution; 1st: 45%, 2nd: 22%, 3rd: 13% 4th: 9%, 5th: 5%, 6th: 3.5% 7th: 2.5%

Grande Course de Haies d'Auteuil
2020
Paul's Saga	L'Autonomie	Galop Marin

Previous years
2019
Benie Des Dieux	De Bon Coeur	Berjou
2018
De Bon Coeur	Bapaume	Dalia Grandchamp
2017
L'Ami Serge	Alex De Larredya	Shaneshill
2016
Ptit Zig	Alex De Larredya	Blue Dragon
2015
Un Temps Pour Tout	Thousand Stars	Zarkandar
2014
Gemix	Le Grand Luce	Zarkandar
2013
Gemix	Solwhit	Zaidpour
2012
Thousand Stars	Nikita Du Berlais	Formosa Joana Has
2011
Thousand Stars	Bel La Vie	Portal's Toy

2010-2001
2010
Mandali	Questarabad	Really Hurley
2009
Questarabad	Portal's Toy	Grande Haya
2008
Oeil Du Maitre	Mid Dancer	Monoalco
2007
Zaiyad	Mister Gyor	Monoalco
2006
Mid Dancer	Princesse D'Anjou	Lycaon De Vauzelle
2005
Lycaon De Vauzelle	Rule Supreme	Double Car
2004
Rule Supreme	Great Love	Kotkijet
2003
Nobody Told Me	Karly Flight	Katiki
2002
Laveron	Vic Toto	Galant Moss
2001
Le Sauvignon	Gilder	Bounce Back

2000-1999
2000
Le Sauvignon	Full Of Ambition	Vaporetto
1999
Vaporetto	Mon Romain	Asolo

The Grande Course de Haies d'Auteuil, sometimes referred to as the French Champion Hurdle, is a Group 1 hurdle race in France which is open to horses aged five years or older. It is run at Auteuil over a distance of 5,100 metres (about 3 miles and 1½ furlongs), and it is scheduled to take place each year in May.

== History ==
The race was first run on May 25, 1874, the same day as the inaugural running of the Grand National de France (now the Grand Steeple-Chase de Paris). It was originally open to horses aged four or older, and it was initially contested over 4,000 metres. This was increased to 4,800 metres in its second year, and to 5,000 metres in 1880. The race was given a new date in 1882 – it was moved to the Wednesday after the Grand Steeple-Chase de Paris, which continued to be run on the last Sunday in May. The following year saw the launch of a new steeplechase at Auteuil, the Prix des Drags, and this was scheduled for the Friday of the same week. This week of top class jump races became known as the Grande Semaine d'Auteuil. The Grande Course de Haies was run as a handicap until 1889, but since then it has held weight for age conditions.

The race was abandoned throughout World War I, with no running from 1915 to 1918. During World War II it was cancelled only once, in 1940. The minimum age was raised to five in 1961, when a new hurdle race, the Grande Course de Haies des 4 Ans (later titled the Prix Alain du Breil), was introduced specifically for four-year-olds. The distance of the Grande Course de Haies was extended to 5,100 metres in 1969. This was cut to 4,100 metres in 1975, and then restored to 5,100 metres in 1979.

Four horses have won both this event and the Grand Steeple-Chase de Paris. These are Blagueur II, Loreto, Ubu III and Mid Dancer. The 1947 winner of the Grande Course de Haies, Le Paillon, later won the most prestigious flat race in France, the Prix de l'Arc de Triomphe. The 1984 winner, Dawn Run (a mare trained in Ireland), also won both the Champion Hurdle and the Cheltenham Gold Cup in England. She returned to Auteuil to attempt a repeat victory in 1986, but during the race she misjudged a hurdle, fell, and died almost instantly.

In 2010, the race was won by flat jockey Christophe Soumillon.

== Records ==
Leading jockey (4 wins):

- John Boon – Vertige (1894), Charlatan (1895), Grandlieu (1898), Kerym (1899)

Leading trainer (8 wins):

- William Head – Evohe II (1937, 1938), Royal Kidney (1939), Ludovic le More (1943), Vatelys (1946), Le Paillon (1947), Septieme Ciel (1948), Friendship (1959)

Leading owner (6 wins):

- Daniel Wildenstein – Gopal (1969), Top Gear (1977), Paiute (1979, 1980), World Citizen (1982), Vaporetto (1999)

== Winners since 1970 ==
Year	Winner	Age	Jockey	Trainer	Owner
1970	Samour	5	Christian Mahé	Jean Laumain	Mrs Hubert Seutet
1971	Le Pontet	6	François Bonni	Gérard Philippeau	Josette Rossi
1972	Hardatit	6	C. Fornaroli	René Pelat	Charles Sweeny
1973	Hardatit	7	Pierre Costes	René Pelat	Charles Sweeny
1974	Baby Taine	5	Ronny Dupon	André Adèle	Georges Blizniansky
1975	Mazel Tov	5	Serge Roux	André Adèle	Mrs Julien Décrion
1976	Les Roseaux	7	Daniel Merle	Gérard Boeuf	Nicole Sarmant
1977	Top Gear	5	Dominique Costard	Georges Pelat	Daniel Wildenstein
1978	Roselier	5	Serge Bérard	Léon Gaumondy	Mrs Léon Gaumondy
1979	Paiute	6	Martin Blackshaw	Georges Pelat	Daniel Wildenstein
1980	Paiute	7	Dominique Costard	Jack Barbe	Daniel Wildenstein
1981	Bison Fute	5	Dominique Costard	Jacques de Chevigny	Mrs Jean Couturié
1982	World Citizen	5	Noel Péguy	Patrick Rago	Daniel Wildenstein
1983	Melinoir	5	Denis Bailliez	Jack Barbe	Francis Wintz
1984	Dawn Run	6	Tony Mullins	Paddy Mullins	Charmian Hill
1985	Le Rheusois	5	Roger Duchêne	Patrick Rago	Claude Ouyoucef
1986	Le Rheusois	6	Denis Leblond	Patrick Rago	Claude Ouyoucef
1987	Claude le Lorrain	8	Patrick-Alain Sauvat	Loïc Audon	André Bergalet
1988	Goodea	8	Béatrice Marie	Jean-Paul Gallorini	Prosper Elmoznino
1989	Sire Rochelais	5	Loïc Manceau	Guy Chérel	Jean-Claude Evain
1990	Tongan	7	Dominique Vincent	Gérard Collet	Wladimir Nikolic
1991	Rose or No	7	Vincent Sartori	Philippe Demercastel	Ecurie Jules Ouaki
1992	Ubu III	6	Adam Kondrat	François Doumen	Marquesa de Moratalla
1993	Ubu III	7	Adam Kondrat	François Doumen	Marquesa de Moratalla
1994	Le Roi Thibault	5	Yannick Fouin	Georges Doleuze	Haras du Reuilly
1995	Matchou	6	Didier Mescam	Jean Lesbordes	Muriel Montauban
1996	Earl Grant	7	Jean-Yves Beaurain	Bernard Sécly	Louis Gautier
1997	Bog Frog	8	Jean-Yves Beaurain	Bernard Sécly	Mrs David Scarisbrick
1998	Mantovo	6	François Benech	Marcel Rolland	Frank McNulty
1999	Vaporetto	6	Thierry Majorcryk	Jean-Paul Gallorini	Daniel Wildenstein
2000	Le Sauvignon	6	Dominique Bressou	Jean Bertran de Balanda	David J. Jackson
2001	Le Sauvignon	7	Dominique Bressou	Jean Bertran de Balanda	David J. Jackson
2002	Laveron	7	Thierry Doumen	François Doumen	Dirk Grauert
2003	Nobody Told Me	5	David Casey	Willie Mullins	Amber Syndicate
2004	Rule Supreme	8	David Casey	Willie Mullins	John J. Fallon
2005	Lycaon de Vauzelle	6	Boris Chameraud	Jean Bertran de Balanda	Francis Wintz
2006	Mid Dancer	5	Christophe Pieux	Arnaud Chaillé-Chaillé	Sean Mulryan
2007	Zaiyad	6	Jacques Ricou	Arnaud Chaillé-Chaillé	Sean Mulryan
2008	Oeil du Maitre	6	Steven Colas	Jean-Paul Gallorini	Alexandrine Berger
2009	Questarabad	5	Regis Schmidlin	Marcel Rolland	Mrs Roger Polani
2010	Mandali	6	Christophe Soumillon	Jean-Paul Gallorini	Ecurie Zingaro
2011	Thousand Stars	7	Ruby Walsh	Willie Mullins	Hammer & Trowel Syndicate
2012	Thousand Stars	8	Ruby Walsh	Willie Mullins	Hammer & Trowel Syndicate
2013	Gemix	5	David Cottin	Nicolas Bertran de Balanda	Mme Francis Teboul
2014	Gemix	6	David Cottin	Nicolas Bertran de Balanda	Mme Francis Teboul
2015	Un Temps Pour Tout	6	James Reveley	David Pipe	Tisdall / Drew
2016	Ptit Zig	7	Sam Twiston-Davies	Paul Nicholls	Fulton / Giles / Webb
2017	L'Ami Serge	7	Daryl Jacob	Nicky Henderson	Simon Munir & Isaac Souede
2018	De Bon Coeur	5	Kevin Nabet	Francois Nicolle	Jacques Detre & Haras de Saint-Voir
2019	Benie des Dieux	8	Paul Townend	Willie Mullins	Susannah Ricci
2020	Paul's Saga (Note: The 2020 race was run in October)	6	Kevin Nabet	David Cottin	Gerald Laroche
2021	L'Autonomie	6	Angelo Zuliani	Francois Nicolle	Catherine Coiffier
2022	Hermes Baie	5	Bertrand Lestrade	Francois Nicolle	Mme Patrick Papot
2023	Thélème	6	Gaetan Masure	Arnaud Chaillé-Chaillé	JDG Bloodstock Services
2024	Losange Bleu	5	Johnny Charron	Dominique Bressou	Mme Patrick Papot
2025	El Clavel	5	James Reveley	Noel George & Amanda Zetterholm	Misol Racing & Ecurie De Roebeck
2026	Losange Bleu	7	Johnny Charron	Dominique Bressou	Mme Patrick Papot

== Earlier winners ==
- 1874 - Jackal
- 1875 - Borely
- 1876 - Vichnou
- 1877 - Miss Lizzie
- 1878 - Patriarche
- 1879 - Paul's Cray
- 1880 - Doublon
- 1881 - Seaman
- 1882 - Marc Antony
- 1883 - Beatus
- 1884 - Baudres
- 1885 - Newmarket
- 1886 - Jannock
- 1887 - Kersage
- 1888 - Aladdin
- 1889 - Vanille
- 1890 - Saint Claude
- 1891 - Augure
- 1892 - Le Gourzy
- 1893 - Ranville
- 1894 - Vertige
- 1895 - Charlatan
- 1896 - Count Schomberg
- 1897 - Soliman
- 1898 - Grandlieu
- 1899 - Kerym
- 1900 - General Peace
- 1901 - Monsieur Piperlin
- 1902 - Bebe *
- 1903 - Nivolet
- 1904 - Hipparque
- 1905 - Karakoul
- 1906 - Fragilite
- 1907 - Chi Lo Sa
- 1908 - Ingenu
- 1909 - Herisson II
- 1910 - Blagueur II
- 1911 - Carpe Diem
- 1912 - Balscadden
- 1913 - Galafron
- 1914 - Lilium
- 1915–18 - no race
- 1919 - Saint Tudwal
- 1920 - Chaud
- 1921 - Forearm
- 1922 - Fauche le Pre
- 1923 - Onyx II
- 1924 - Arrowhead
- 1925 - Rocking Chair
- 1926 - Histoire de Rire
- 1927 - Lannilis
- 1928 - Don Zuniga
- 1929 - Largo
- 1930 - Le Bouif
- 1931 - Baoule
- 1932 - Pour le Roi
- 1933 - Lands End
- 1934 - Lord Byron
- 1935 - Robin des Bois
- 1936 - Cerealiste
- 1937 - Evohe II
- 1938 - Evohe II *
- 1939 - Royal Kidney
- 1940 - no race
- 1941 - Short
- 1942 - Lycoming
- 1943 - Ludovic le More
- 1944 - Wild Risk
- 1945 - Wild Risk
- 1946 - Vatelys
- 1947 - Le Paillon
- 1948 - Septieme Ciel
- 1949 - Nigra
- 1950 - Amati
- 1951 - Verdi
- 1952 - Prince Hindou
- 1953 - Frascati
- 1954 - Sicie
- 1955 - Elegant
- 1956 - Mehariste
- 1957 - Romantisme
- 1958 - Loreto
- 1959 - Friendship
- 1960 - Poutje Elday
- 1961 - Choute
- 1962 - Miror
- 1963 - Ouf
- 1964 - Santo Pietro
- 1965 - Ketch
- 1966 - Pansa
- 1967 - Rivoli
- 1968 - Orvilliers
- 1969 - Gopal

* Mr Quilp finished first in 1902 but was disqualified.
* Porthos finished first in 1938 but was relegated to third place following a Stewards' Inquiry.

== See also ==
- List of French jump horse races
