= French Chaser =

French breed of horse

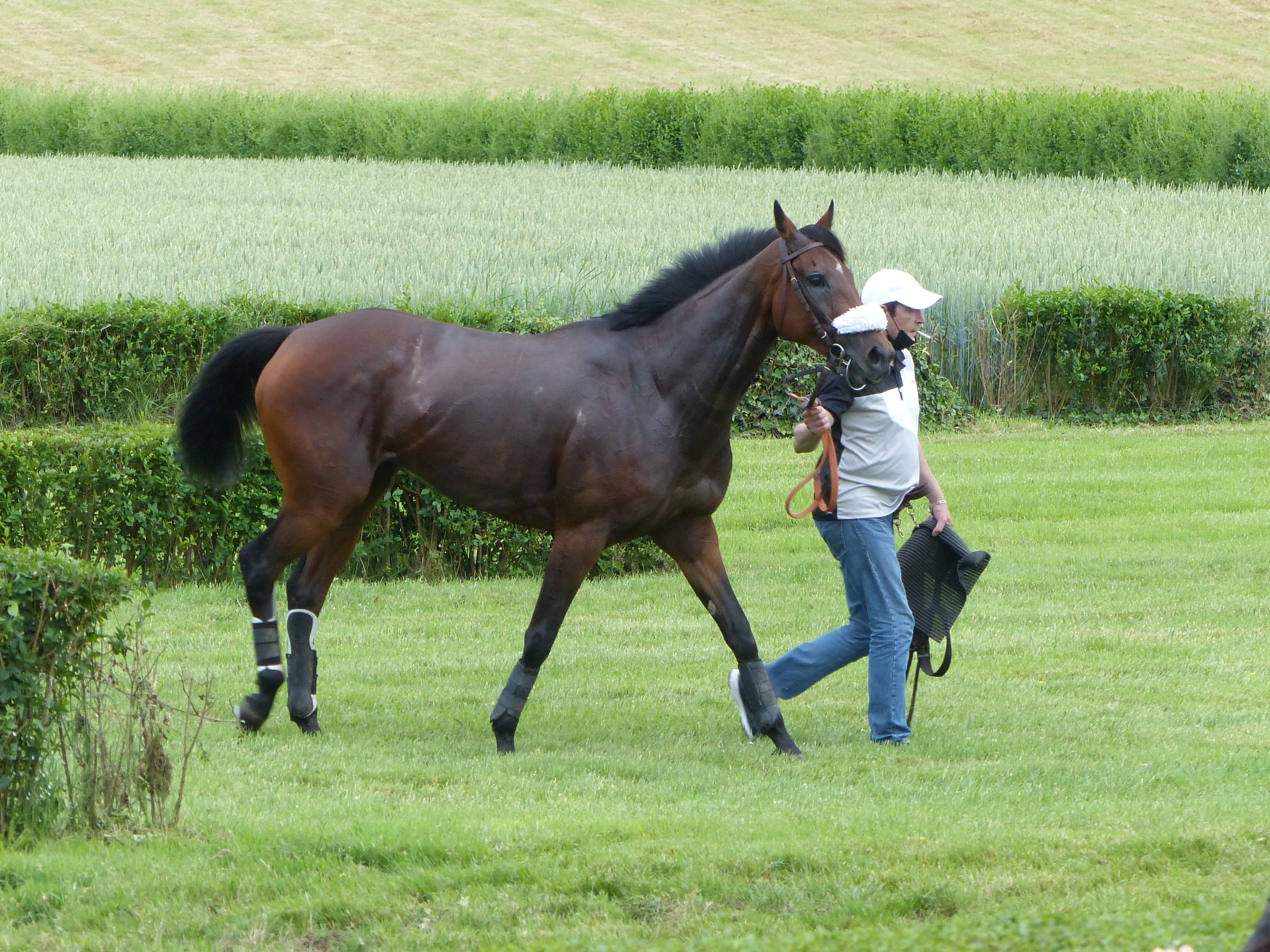
- Conservation status: FAO (2007): not listed; DAD-IS (2025): not at risk
- Other names: Autre Que Pur-Sang; AQPS
- Country of origin: France

Traits
- Height: 1.60–1.70 m

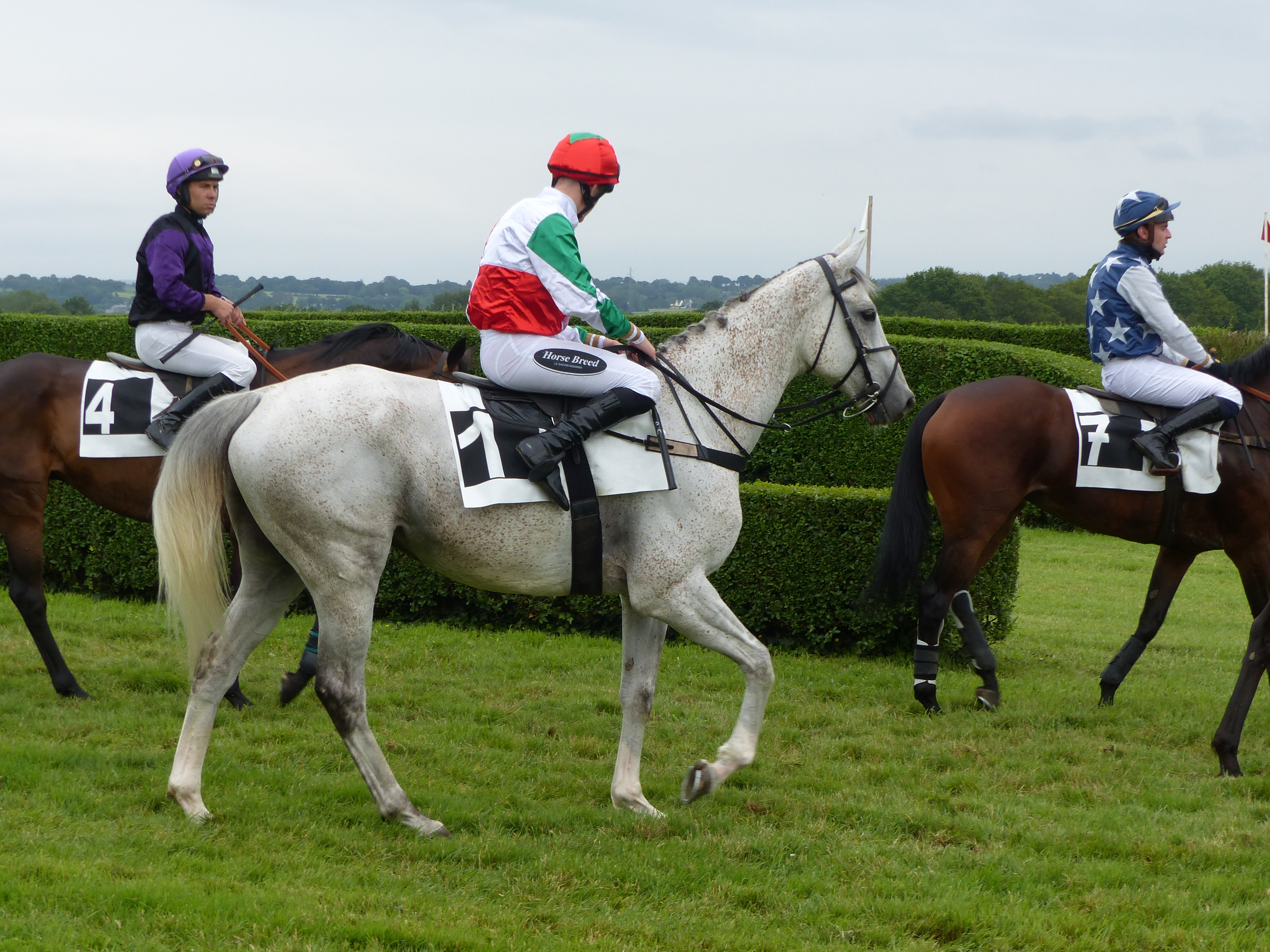
Bénévolat 12, an AQPS (2021)

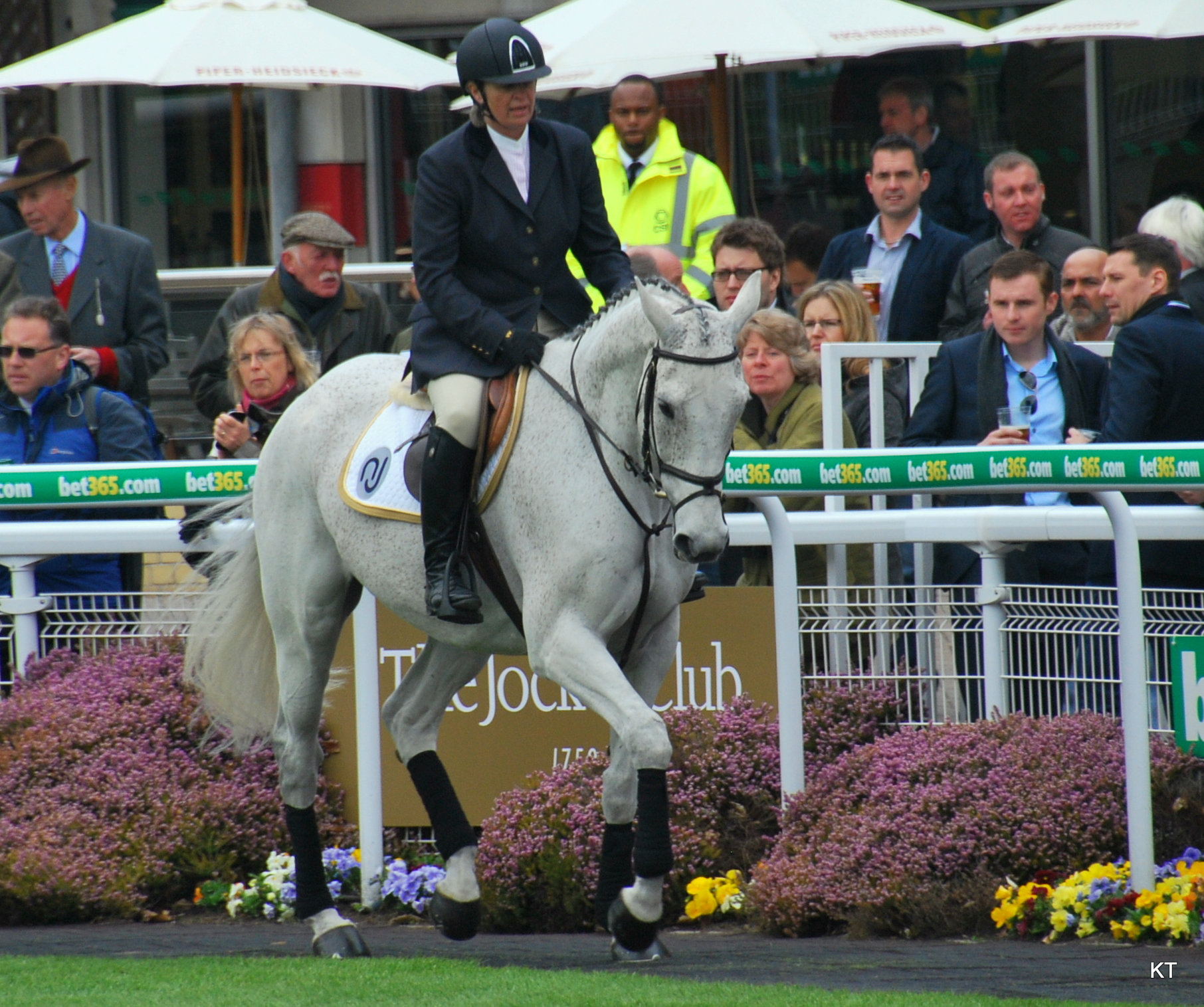
Neptune Collonges, winner of the Grand National in 2012

The French Chaser, French: Autre Que Pur-Sang or AQPS, is a French breed of racehorse bred specifically for its jumping ability in steeplechase and cross-country racing.

It originates from warmblood horses bred principally for military use in the nineteenth century. It was officially recognised as a breed in 2005, and a stud-book was started in that year or in 2006. Only horses with at least 87.5%, but less than 100%, Thoroughbred blood are eligible for registration. Out-crossing with Thoroughbred, Anglo-Arab and Selle Français stock is permitted.

== History ==
For many years the AQPS were registered for administrative purposes as Selle Français. Since 2005 an AQPS studbook is now maintained with its specific breeding rules.

The AQPS racing breed developed around the end of the 19th century when French farmers began to cross cart horse mares with Thoroughbred stallions to produce a fast and hardy horse that has proven to be best suited for steeplechase racing. The French national studs made available to local breeders at affordable prices "stayer" TB stallions which were disregarded by the flat-race industry. The average person most likely would not be able to see any difference between an AQPS and a Thoroughbred as evolution of the breed has resulted in AQPS horses today being a minimum of 87.5 percent Thoroughbred. The remaining 12.5 percent must be French saddle-bred, usually from AQPS itself but Selle Français and Anglo-Arab blood is also permissible.

In France, Al Capone II won the Grade One Grand Steeple-Chase de Paris in 1997 and seven consecutive Grade One Prix La Haye Jousselin steeplechase races at Auteuil Hippodrome between 1993 and 1999. His full brother The Fellow won the Prix La Haye Jousselin in 1990 and the Grand Steeple-Chase de Paris in 1991 and then – in England – the King George VI Chase in 1991 and 1992 and the Cheltenham Gold Cup in 1994.

In other races in the British Isles, Nupsala, trained by François Doumen, won the King George VIth Chase in 1987, with a lead over Desert Orchid of 15 lengths. First Gold won the King George VI Chase in 2000 by 12 lengths, and later won the Punchestown Gold Cup; Edredon Bleu won the Queen Mother Champion Chase in 2000 and the King George VI Chase in 2003. Three of the horses have won the Grand National at Aintree: Mon Môme in 2009; Neptune Collonges in 2012; and Pineau de Re in 2014.

Orphée des Blins won the Grand Pardubice Steeplechase in the Czech Republic in 2012, 2013 and 2014.
