= James Reveley =

English jockey, born 1989

Personal information
- Born: 1989 (age 36–37) Saltburn-by-the-Sea, North Yorkshire
- Occupation: Jockey

Horse racing career
- Sport: Horse racing

Honours
- Cravache d'Or (French champion jump jockey) (2016, 2021, 2022)

James Reveley (born 1989) is an English trainer and retired jockey who is based in France. He competed over jumps as a jockey, winning 21 Grade 1 races, and was three times French champion jump jockey.

== Background ==
Reveley comes from a racing background. He grew up on Groundhill Farm near Saltburn-by-the-Sea in North Yorkshire, where his father Keith Reveley and grandmother Mary Reveley had a training yard. His grandmother saddled more than 2000 winners on the flat and over jumps during her career. Reveley, supported by his grandmother, competed in junior showjumping.

== Career as a jockey ==
Revely started riding as a conditional jockey for trainer Nicky Richards. He first rode in France when on a three-week working holiday at the yard of trainer Guillaume Macaire in 2007. He then divided his time between England and France until 2015, when he moved to France on a permanent basis. He secured his first Grade race in 2009, when Rambling Minster, trained by his father, won the Grade 3 Blue Square Gold Cup at Haydock. His first Grade 1 win was on Reve De Sivola, trained by Nick Williams, in the 2013 Grand Prix d'Automne at Auteuil in Paris.

In 2017 Reveley was crowned French champion jump jockey for the first time. Further championships followed in 2021 and 2022. He won the Grand Steeple-Chase de Paris on So French for Macaire in 2016 and 2017, and on On The Go, also trained by Macaire, in 2018. In 2023 he secured his only Grade 1 race in Britain when Il Est Francais, trained in France by Noel George & Amanda Zetterholm, won the Kauto Star Novices' Chase at Kempton Park.

Reveley announced in October 2026 that he was going to retire from race-riding, due to problems keeping his weight down. He said he would concentrate on training in partnership with Marine Pineda. He then decided to retire immediately after riding three Grade 1 winners at Auteuil on 15 November 2026. His final race of the day was a Listed Handicap, which he also won. The 37-year-old said: "I've decided to stop there after such a great day. It's a perfect way to end really. I can now concentrate on getting the yard set up ready for next year. I was just hesitating whether to keep going a bit longer or not and ride this winter, but I just think it's a nice way to end and great memories." He had won a total of twenty Grade 1 races in France and one in Britain.

== Personal life ==
Reveley and his wife Alexia have two sons, Georges and Charles.

== Major wins ==
France

- Grand Prix d'Automne - (1) Reve De Sivola (2013)
- Grande Course de Haies d'Auteuil - (2) Un Temps Pour Tout (2015), El Clavel (2025)
- Prix Maurice Gillois - (4) So French (2015), On The Go (2017), Gessy Raiselle (2022), Metronomique (2026)
- Grand Steeple-Chase de Paris - (3) So French (2016, 2017), On The Go (2018)
- Prix Cambacérès - (3) De Bon Coeur (2016), Master Dino (2017), St Donats (2022)
- Prix Renaud du Vivier - (4) De Bon Coeur (2017), Master Dino (2018), Il Est Francais (2022), It's Win O'Clock (2025), Guadalquivir (2026)
- Prix Ferdinand Dufaure - (1) Metronomique (2026)
- Prix La Haye Jousselin - (1) Kolokico (2026)

(United Kingdom) Great Britain

- Kauto Star Novices' Chase - (1) Il Est Francais (2023)
