= Al Capone II =

French racehorse

- Sire: Italic
- Dam: L'Oranaise
- Damsire: Paris Jour
- Sex: Gelding
- Foaled: 1988
- Country: France
- Colour: Bay
- Breeder: J Cypres & L Couetil
- Owner: Robert Fougedoire
- Trainer: Bernard Secly
- Record: 65 starts: 26 wins, 32 placings
- Earnings: € 2.623.874

Major wins
- Prix Georges Courtois (1993, 1994, 1996); Grand Steeple-Chase de Paris (1997); Prix La Haye Jousselin (1993, 1994, 1995, 1996, 1997, 1998, 1999)

Awards
- French steeplechaser of the 20th century

Honours
- French Horse Racing Hall of Fame; Prix Al Capone II at Cagnes-sur-Mer Racetrack; Life-sized statue at Auteuil Hippodrome
- Last updated on January 4, 2007

Al Capone II (20 March 1988 – 21 October 2020) was a French Autre Que Pur-Sang (AQPS), translated as Other than Thoroughbred) steeplechaser. Sired by the Selle Français jumper Italic, and out of the Thoroughbred mare L'Oranaise, he is a full brother to The Fellow who won the 1991 Grand Steeple-Chase de Paris, the 1991 & 1992 King George VI Chase, and the 1994 Cheltenham Gold Cup.

Al Capone II won the Prix Georges Courtois three out of four years between 1993 and 1996, finishing second in 1995. He also won the prestigious Grand Steeple-Chase de Paris in 1997 but gained worldwide recognition after winning the Group One Prix La Haye Jousselin at Auteuil Hippodrome seven consecutive times from 1993 through 1999. In his last race on November 5, 2000, Al Capone II finished second to First Gold in the Prix La Haye Jousselin, just missing becoming the only horse to ever win the same race eight times.

A gelding, Al Capone II was retired to race track services for France Galop at Chantilly Racecourse. A lifesize bronze by sculpture Jean Clagett was erected in his honor at the Auteuil racetrack.

== See also ==
- Repeat winners of horse races
