= Grand Prix d'Automne =

Hurdle horse race in France

- Class: Group 1
- Location: Auteuil Racecourse; Paris, France
- Inaugurated: 1929
- Race type: Hurdle race

Race information
- Distance: 4,800 metres (3m)
- Surface: Turf
- Track: Left-handed
- Qualification: Five-years-old and up
- Weight: 65 kg (5yo); 67 kg (6yo+); Allowances; 2 kg for mares

Grand Prix d'Automne
2025
Losange Bleu	Jet Blue	Isis D'Inor

Previous years
2022
Theleme	Hermes Baie	L'Autonomie
2021
Galop Marin	L'Autonomie	Folsom Prison

2020–2011
2020
Galop Marin	Paul's Saga	L'Autonomie
2019
Galop Marin	Paul's Saga	Bergerac
2018
Galop Marin	Miss Salsa Blue	Dalia Grandchamp
2017
Alex De Larredya	Device	Galop Marin
2016
Alex De Larredya	Solway	Ptit Zig
2015
Thousand Stars	Aubusson	Hippomene
2014
Zarkandar	Gemix	Dulce Leo
2013
Reve De Sivola	Lord Prestige	Gemix
2012
Saint Du Chenet	Le Tranquille	River Choice
2011
La Segnora	Roi Du Val	Diamant De Beaufai

2010–2001
2010
Questarabad	Coralhasi	Good Bye Simon
2009
Questarabad	Grande Haya	Worldbest
2008
Monoalco	Atamane	Coralhasi
2007
Zaiyad	Monoalco	Shinco Du Berlais
2006
Zaiyad	Royale Athenia	Lycaon De Vauzelle
2005
Millenium Royal	Lycaon De Vauzelle	Sunspot
2004
Grande Haya	Great Love	Ennemi D'Etat
2003
Katiki	Karly Flight	Great Love
2002
Laveron	Tiger Groom	El Fuego
2001
Magnus	Fou Du Roy	Kimbi

2000–1999
2000
Le Sauvignon	Baracouda	Kimbi
1999
Mon Romain	Kimbi	Vaporetto
1997
Mon Romain	Force Atlantique	Apple's Girl

The Grand Prix d'Automne is a Group 1 hurdle race in France which is open to horses aged five years or older. It is run at Auteuil over a distance of 4,800 metres (about 3 miles), and it is scheduled to take place each year in late October or early November.

== History ==
The race was first run in 1929 as an autumn counterpart to the Grand Prix du Printemps, a handicap race run at the same course in spring. The Grand Prix d'Automne, however, was a weight-for-age event until becoming a handicap in 1940 before reverting to weight-for-age in 1990. Originally run over 3,800 metres race has been run over a variety of distances. The race was run over 4100 metres between 1930 and 1938, 4000 metres from 1940 to 1942, 4500 metres from 1943 to 1967, 4600 metres in 1968, 4300 metres in 1969, 4100 metres from 1970 to 1990 and 4800 metres since 1991. The race was open to four-year-olds until 1989.

The race was not run in 1939.

== Records ==
Leading horses (4 wins):

- Galop Marin (2018, 2019, 2020,2021)

Leading jockey (4 wins):

- Morgan Regairaz - Galop Marin (2018, 2019, 2020,2021)

Leading trainer (8 wins):

- William Head – Filidor (1931), Evohé (1934, 1936, 1937), Daring (1944), Vatelys (1946), Blue Butterfly (1947), Maisons-Laffitte (1951)

Leading owner (6 wins):

- Mme Patrick Papot - Galop Marin (2018, 2019, 2020,2021), Losange Bleu (2024, 2025)

== Winners since 1997 ==
Year	Winner	Age	Jockey	Trainer	Owner
1997	Mon Romain	5	Anne-Sophie Madelaine	Jean Lesbordes	Michel Daugreilh
1998	Mon Romain	6	Anne-Sophie Madelaine	Jean Lesbordes	Michel Daugreilh
1999	Mon Romain	7	Philippe Chevalier	Marcel Rolland	Michel Daugreilh
2000	Le Sauvignon	6	Dominique Bressou	Jehan Bertran de Balanda	David J. Jackson
2001	Magnus	5	Christophe Pieux	Jacques Ortet	Naji Pharaon
2002	Laveron	7	Thierry Doumen	François Doumen	Dirk Grauert
2003	Katiki	6	Laurent Metais	Jean-Paul Gallorini	J Shalam & J Ouechec
2004	Grande Haya	5	Cyrille Gombeau	Alain Bonin	Dominique Vacher
2005	Millenium Royal	5	Arnaud Duchene	François Doumen	J Vasicek
2006	Zaiyad	5	Jacques Ricou	Arnaud Chaillé-Chaillé	Sean Mulryan
2007	Zaiyad	6	Jacques Ricou	Arnaud Chaillé-Chaillé	Sean Mulryan
2008	Monoalco	8	David Berra	Philippe Peltier	Philippe Peltier
2009	Questarabad	5	Regis Schmidlin	Marcel Rolland	Mrs Roger Polani
2010	Questarabad	6	Regis Schmidlin	Marcel Rolland	Mrs Roger Polani
2011	La Segnora	5	Frederic Ditta	Yann-Marie Porzier	Paul Sebag
2012	Saint du Chénet	6	Regis Schmidlin	Marcel Rolland	Magalen Bryant
2013	Reve de Sivola	8	James Reveley	Nick Williams	Paul Duffy
2014	Zarkandar	7	Vincent Cheminaud	Paul Nicholls	Chris Giles & Potensis Ltd
2015	Thousand Stars	11	Ruby Walsh	Willie Mullins	Hammer & Trowel Syndicate
2016	Alex de Larredya	6	Gaetan Masure	François Nicolle	Simon Munir
2017	Alex de Larredya	7	Gaetan Masure	François Nicolle	Simon Munir
2018	Galop Marin	6	Morgan Regairaz	Dominique Bressou	Mme Patrick Papot
2019	Galop Marin	7	Morgan Regairaz	Dominique Bressou	Mme Patrick Papot
2020	Galop Marin	8	Morgan Regairaz	Dominique Bressou	Mme Patrick Papot
2021	Galop Marin	9	Morgan Regairaz	Dominique Bressou	Mme Patrick Papot
2022	Theleme	5	Pierre Dubourg	Arnaud Chaille-Chaille	JDG Bloodstock Services
2023	Theleme	6	Gaetan Masure	Arnaud Chaille-Chaille	JDG Bloodstock Services
2024	Losange Bleu	5	Johnny Charron	Dominique Bressou	Mme Patrick Papot
2025	Losange Bleu	6	Johnny Charron	Dominique Bressou	Mme Patrick Papot
2026	Kingland	6	Kevin Nabet	Francois Nicolle	Ecurie Mrs Lynne Maclennan, Thierry Cypres Et Al

== Earlier winners ==
- 1929 – Le Bouif
- 1930 – Hoca
- 1931 – Filidor/ Rebenti (dead heat)
- 1932 – Port Said
- 1933 – Prince Oli
- 1934 – Evohé
- 1935 – Anonyme
- 1936 – Evohé
- 1937 – Evohé
- 1938 – Barboteur
- 1939 – no race
- 1940 – Duralumet
- 1941 – Cocktail
- 1942 – Kargal
- 1943 – Quibus
- 1944 – Daring
- 1945 – Houdon
- 1946 – Vatelys
- 1947 – Blue Butterfly
- 1948 – Tyran
- 1949 – Pyrrhus
- 1950 – Pyrrhus
- 1951 – Maisons-Laffitte
- 1952 – Prosper
- 1953 – Eole
- 1954 – James Stuart
- 1955 – Méhariste
- 1956 – Méhariste
- 1957 – Romantisme
- 1958 – Ming
- 1959 – Marivaux
- 1960 – Sweater
- 1961 – Marivaux
- 1962 – Liberty's
- 1963 – Novio
- 1964 – Sapin
- 1965 – Pansa
- 1966 – Rivoli
- 1967 – Silvor
- 1968 - Francois Saubaber
- 1969 – Arrondi
- 1970 – Tim
- 1971 – Hardatit
- 1972 – Roy du Sillon
- 1973 – Dulcio
- 1974 – Porto Rafti
- 1975 – Soyor
- 1976 – Quart de Vin
- 1977 – Manor
- 1978 – Tetrac
- 1979 – Pavo Real
- 1980 – Pavino
- 1981 – Whit
- 1982 – Nous Aussi
- 1983 – Gelas
- 1984 – Fils de Reine
- 1985 – Cutty Sark Memory
- 1986 – Duke of Riva
- 1987 – Oteuil
- 1988 – Reve Bleu
- 1989 – Afkal
- 1990 – Rose or No
- 1991 – El Triunfo
- 1992 – Vieux Bourbon
- 1993 – Bitwood
- 1994 – Algan
- 1995 – Topkar
- 1996 – Royal Chance

== See also ==
- List of French jump horse races
