= List of French jump horse races =

A list of notable jump horse races which take place annually in France, under the authority of France Galop, including all events which presently hold Grade 1, 2 or 3 status.

== Grade 1 ==
Month	Race Name	Type	Racecourse	Distance †	Age
May	Grand Steeple-Chase de Paris	Chase	Auteuil	6,000	5yo +
May	Prix Ferdinand Dufaure	Chase	Auteuil	4,300	4yo
May	Grande Course de Haies d'Auteuil	Hurdle	Auteuil	5,100	5yo +
June	Prix Alain du Breil	Hurdle	Auteuil	3,900	4yo
November	Grand Prix d'Automne	Hurdle	Auteuil	4,800	5yo +
November	Prix Maurice Gillois	Chase	Auteuil	4,400	4yo
November	Prix Cambacérès	Hurdle	Auteuil	3,600	3yo
November	Prix La Haye Jousselin	Chase	Auteuil	5,500	5yo +
November	Prix Renaud du Vivier	Hurdle	Auteuil	3,900	4yo

== Grade 2 ==
Month	Race Name	Type	Racecourse	Distance †	Age
April	Prix Murat	Chase	Auteuil	4,400	5yo +
April / May	Prix Jean Stern	Chase	Auteuil	4,300	4yo
April / May	Prix Léon Rambaud	Hurdle	Auteuil	3,900	5yo +
April / May	Prix Amadou	Hurdle	Auteuil	3,900	4yo
May	Prix La Barka	Hurdle	Auteuil	4,300	5yo +
June	Prix des Drags	Chase	Auteuil	4,400	5yo +
October	Prix Georges de Talhouët-Roy	Hurdle	Auteuil	3,600	3yo
Oct / Nov	Grand Steeple-Chase d'Enghien	Chase	Enghien	5,000	5yo +
November	Prix Congress	Chase	Auteuil	3,600	3yo
November	Prix Léon Olry-Roederer	Hurdle	Auteuil	4,300	5yo +
Nov / Dec	Prix Georges Courtois	Chase	Auteuil	4,400	5yo +

== Grade 3 ==
Month	Race Name	Type	Racecourse	Distance †	Age
January	Grand Prix de la Ville de Nice	Chase	Cagnes-sur-Mer	4,600	5yo +
January	Grand Prix de Pau	Chase	Pau	5,300	5yo +
Feb / March	Prix Juigné	Hurdle	Auteuil	3,600	5yo +
Feb / March	Prix Robert de Clermont-Tonnerre	Chase	Auteuil	4,300	5yo +
March	Prix Duc d'Anjou	Chase	Auteuil	3,500	4yo
March	Prix d'Indy	Hurdle	Auteuil	3,600	4yo
March	Prix Troytown	Chase	Auteuil	4,400	5yo +
March / April	Prix Fleuret	Chase	Auteuil	4,300	4yo
March / April	Prix Hypothèse	Hurdle	Auteuil	3,900	5yo +
April	Prix de Pépinvast	Hurdle	Auteuil	3,600	4yo
April	Prix du Président de la République	Chase	Auteuil	4,700	5yo +
April / May	Prix Ingré	Chase	Auteuil	4,400	5yo +
April / May	Grande Course de Haies de Printemps	Hurdle	Auteuil	4,300	5yo +
May	Prix Le Parisien	Hurdle	Auteuil	3,900	4yo
June	Prix La Périchole	Chase	Auteuil	4,300	4yo
June	Prix Christian de Tredern (fillies and mares)	Hurdle	Auteuil	3,600	4–5yo
September	Prix The Fellow	Chase	Auteuil	4,300	4yo
September	Prix de Compiègne	Hurdle	Auteuil	3,900	5yo +
September	Prix de Maisons-Laffitte	Hurdle	Auteuil	3,600	4yo
October	Prix Orcada	Chase	Auteuil	4,300	4yo
October	Prix Carmarthen	Hurdle	Auteuil	3,900	5yo +
October	Prix Héros XII	Chase	Auteuil	4,400	5yo +
October	Prix Montgomery	Chase	Auteuil	4,700	5yo +
October	Prix Pierre de Lassus	Hurdle	Auteuil	3,900	4yo
November	Prix Bournosienne (fillies)	Hurdle	Auteuil	3,600	3yo
November	Prix Sytaj (fillies and mares)	Chase	Auteuil	4,300	4–5yo
November	Prix Général de Saint-Didier	Hurdle	Compiègne	3,500	3yo
November	Prix Léopold d'Orsetti	Hurdle	Compiègne	3,800	4yo +
Nov / Dec	Prix Morgex	Chase	Auteuil	4,300	4yo
Nov / Dec	Prix André Michel (fillies and mares)	Hurdle	Auteuil	3,600	4–5yo

== Selected other races ==
Month	Race Name	Type	Racecourse	Distance †	Age
Feb / March	Prix Rohan	Hurdle	Auteuil	3,600	4yo +
March	Prix Lutteur III	Chase	Auteuil	4,400	5yo +
June	Prix Rigoletto	Chase	Auteuil	4,400	5yo +
September	Prix Violon II	Chase	Auteuil	4,400	5yo +
