= Prix Renaud du Vivier =

Hurdle horse race in France

Prix Renaud du Vivier
2025
It's Win O'Clock	Sain D'Esprit	Miss Wood

Previous years
2024
Kingland	Zephyr De Beaumont	Losange Vert Bleu
2023
Losange Bleu	July Flower	Japon
2022
Il Est Francais	Ine Anjou	Spirit Of The Moon
2021
Theleme	Colbert Du Berlais	Martator

2020-2011
2020
Moises Has	James Du Berlais	Saint Turgeon
2019
L'Autonomie	Cotee Sud	Byzance Du Berlais
2018
Master Dino	Tunis	Raffles Sun
2017
De Bon Coeur	Pop Art Du Berlais	D'Vina
2016
Capivari	Footpad	Adrien Du Pont
2015
Blue Dragon	Bonito Du Berlais	Bosseur
2014
Hippomene	Roll On Has	Hilton Du Berlais
2013
Ptit Zig	Le Grand Luce	Un Temps Pour Tout
2012
Esmondo	Defi D'Anjou	Gemix
2011
Grand D'Auteuil	Sleeping Mat	Libaute

2010-2000
2010
Bel La Vie	Cristal Bonus	Prince Oui Oui
2009
Rock Noir	Jumbo Rio	Najaf
2008
Questarabad	La Grande Dame	Worldbest
2007
Shekira	Good Bye Simon	Peldero
2006
Or Noir De Somoza	Lina Drop	Kasbah Bliss
2005
Royale Athenia	Zaiyad	Sol Roc
2004
Maia Eria	Cyrlight	Baby Du Rheu
2003
Nickname	Loumie	Katoune
2002
Karly Flight	Foreman	Kotkita
2001
Line Marine	Tiger Groom	Cyborsun
2000
Caballo Raptor	Bounce Back	Gun'n Roses

The Prix Renaud du Vivier is a Group 1 hurdle race in France which is open to four-year-old horses. It is run at Auteuil over a distance of 3,900 metres (about 2 miles and 3 1/2 furlongs), and it is scheduled to take place each year in November. It is the winter championship event for four-year-old hurdlers and is also known as Grande Course de Haies des 4 Ans. The race was first run in 1986 and is named in honour of Renaud du Vivier de Fay-Solignac (1896-1985) who was President of the Société des Steeple-Chases de France from 1968 to 1977.

== Winners ==
Year	Winner	Jockey	Trainer
2000	Caballo Raptor	Jean-Yves Beaurain	Bernard Secly
2001	Line Marine	Christophe Pieux	Jacques Ortet
2002	Karly Flight	Philippe Sourzac	Arnaud Chaille-Chaille
2003	Nickname	Thierry Majorcryk	Jean-Paul Gallorini
2004	Maia Eria	Christophe Pieux	Yann Porzier
2005	Royale Athenia	Cyrille Gombeau	Bernard Barbier
2006	Or Noir De Somoza	Christophe Pieux	Arnaud Chaille-Chaille
2007	Shekira	Jacques Ricou	Arnaud Chaille-Chaille
2008	Questarabad	Regis Schmidlin	Marcel Rolland
2009	Rock Noir	Alexis Acker	Marcel Rolland
2010	Bel La Vie	Bertrand Lestrade	Guillaume Macaire
2011	Grand D'Auteuil	Jonathan Nattiez	Bernard Beaunez
2012	Esmondo	Bertrand Lestrade	Guillaume Macaire
2013	Ptit Zig	David Cottin	Paul Nicholls
2014	Hippomene	David Cottin	Jean-Paul Gallorini
2015	Blue Dragon	David Cottin	Guy Cherel
2016	Capivari	Regis Schmidlin	Francois-Marie Cottin
2017	De Bon Coeur	James Reveley	Francois Nicolle
2018	Master Dino	James Reveley	Guillaume Macaire
2019	L'Autonomie	Angelo Zuliani	Francois Nicolle
2020	Moises Has	Steven Calas	Francois Nicolle
2025	It's Win O'Clock	James Reveley	Noel George & Amanda Zetterholm
2026	Guadalquivir	James Reveley	Noel George & Amanda Zetterholm

== See also ==
- List of French jump horse races
