= Prix Ferdinand Dufaure =

Steeplechase horse race in France

- Class: Group 1
- Location: Auteuil Racecourse; Paris, France
- Inaugurated: 1951
- Race type: Steeplechase
- Sponsor: L'Équipe
- Website: france-galop.com

Race information
- Distance: 4,100 metres (2m 4½f)
- Surface: Turf
- Track: Left-handed
- Qualification: Four-year-olds
- Weight: 67 kg Allowances; 2 kg for fillies
- Purse: €220,000 (2020); Distribution; 1st: 45%, 2nd: 22%, 3rd: 13% 4th: 9%, 5th: 5%, 6th: 3.5% 7th: 2.5%

Prix Ferdinand Dufaure
2025
Lanivtsi	Martha Cannary	Lecoeurdeshommes

Previous years
2024
Kolokico	Kador De Ciergues	Koriste
2023
Juntos Ganamos	La Marche Bleue	Jazz Manouche
2022
Altesse Du Berlais	Impressive	Iceo Madrik
2021
Le Listrac	L'Aubonniere	Hades

2020-2011
2020
Gardons Le Sourire	Yeiayel	Nanosecond
2019
Goliath Du Berlais	Bel Apsis	Thrilling
2018
Whetstone	Evidence Madrik	Kapkiline
2017
Srelighonn	Dalia Grandchamp	Burn Out
2016
Punch Nantais	Roi Mage	Politikar
2015
Kotkikova	Kobrouk	Karelcytic
2014
Fleur D'Ainay	Laterano	Royale Flag
2013
Storm Of Saintly	Volca De Thaix	Victoire Des Borde
2012
Teejay Flying	Saint Palois	Carlain
2011
Grand Charly	Badoudal	Talent D'Estruval

2010-2004
2010
Saint Du Chenet	Kauto Stone	Ole Companero
2009
Rubi Ball	Long Run	Realmont
2008
Oculi	Queen Des Places	Synaptique
2007
Remember Rose	Master Minded	Mildon
2006
Or Noir De Somoza	Ombre D'Estruval	Organiz
2005
Bonbon Rose	Anglican	Willdance
2004
Cyrlight	Mysoko	Psychee Du Berlais

The Prix Ferdinand Dufaure is a Group 1 steeplechase in France which is open to four-year-old horses. It is run at Auteuil over a distance of 4,100 metres (about 2 miles and 4½ furlongs), and it is scheduled to take place each year in late May.

The event is named in memory of Ferdinand Dufaure, a former committee member of the Société des Steeple-Chases de France, who died in 1947. It was first run in 1951, and its distance was initially set at 4,500 metres. This was cut to 3,800 metres in 1953. The race was added to Auteuil's summer program in 1961, when another event, the Prix Maurice Gillois, was moved to the autumn. The length of the Prix Ferdinand Dufaure was frequently modified in the late 1960s and early 1970s, before a more settled period over 4,400 metres began in 1973. The present distance, 4,100 metres, was introduced in 1986.

The Prix Ferdinand Dufaure is the main trial for November's Prix Maurice Gillois (Grand Steeple-Chase des Quatre Ans), which is the championship race for four-year-old steeplechasers in France. Six horses have won both events, most recently Oculi in 2008. The runner-up in the 2007 Prix Ferdinand Dufaure, Master Minded, subsequently became a champion two-mile chaser in England.

== Records ==
Leading jockey (6 wins):

- Christophe Pieux – Kizitca (1996), Valdance (1998), Bonbon Rose (2005), Or Noir de Somoza (2006), Remember Rose (2007), Rubi Ball (2009)

Leading trainer (6 wins):

- Jacques Ortet – Oblat (1983), Guchen (1985), Frappeuse (1988), Kizitca (1996), Valdance (1998), Rubi Ball (2009)

Leading owner (3 wins): (includes part ownership)

- Julien Décrion – Ki Ta Dai (1954), Morgex (1968), Biron (1970)
- Sean Mulryan – Cyrlight (2004), Bonbon Rose (2005), Or Noir de Somoza (2006)
- Magalen Bryant - Turgot (2001), Saint du Chenet (2010), Whetstone (2018)

== Winners ==
Year	Winner	Jockey	Trainer	Owner
1951	Bremontier	Roger Obry	Arthur Bates	Edouard Gugenheim
1952	Lord Boby	René Beche	Henri Brierre	A. Chiaverini
1953	Carpaccio	Claude Maire	Pierre Pelat	Simone Del Duca
1954	Ki Ta Dai	Pierre Delfarguiel	André Adèle	Julien Décrion
1955	Bonosnap	Jacques Fabre	Georges Pelat	Antonin Mourrut
1956	Porte Fanion	Claude Maire	Arthur Bates	Edouard Gugenheim
1957	Reine des Landes	Jean Bourges	Georges Pelat	Mrs Georges Pelat
1958	Reymio	Roger Obry	Noël Pelat	Georges Rouquie
1959	Bustier	Maurice Prod'homme	André Adèle	André Adèle
1960	Gigoletto	Yves Daniel	Léon Gaumondy	E. Labreveux
1961	Artus II	Marcel Maschio	Christian Doumen	Fernand Buret
1962	Atomium	Pierre Biancone	Noël Pelat	Comte de Monteynard
1963	Gerardmer	Claude Deleuze	Maurice d'Okhuysen	Comte René de Rivaud
1964	Bazouka II	Georges Hamon	René Sirvain	Jean Seguinotte
1965	Pavillon	Gérard Boeuf	Antoine Monnat	A. Baguenault de Puchesse
1966	Prime	Jacques Geneau	Pierre Pelat	Comte L. de Kerouara
1967	Taverne	Christian Mahé	Arthur Bates	Raphaël Hakim
1968	Morgex	Jean-Paul Ciravegna	André Adèle	Julien Décrion
1969	Francion	Jean-Jacques Declercq	Pierre Biancone	Marcel Le Masson
1970	Biron	Jean-Paul Ciravegna	André Adèle	Julien Décrion
1971	Firebird	Alain Grimaux	Arthur Bates	Roger Mouly
1972	Xochimil	J. P. Pirodon	Hubert d'Aillières	M. des Roches de Chassay
1973	Incantado	Pierre Costes	Georges Pelat	Daniel Wildenstein
1974	Grey Rabbit	Jean-Jacques Declercq	Jacques Geneau	Hilaire Spiers
1975	Vieux Yor	Hervé Corfdir	Willie Kalley	Mrs Dick Kalley
1976	Seventh Heaven	Jacques Morin	Bernard Sécly	Lawrence M. Gelb
1977	Moncourt	Hervé Corfdir	Marcel Maschio	Georges Sebaoun
1978	Tanlas	Claude Dugast	Léon Sansson	A. Sansson
1979	Lapo d'Or	Denis Leblond	Jean-Paul Gallorini	Giuseppe Campanella
1980	Gelas	Bernard Gauthier	Jack Barbe	Mrs Michel Maréchal
1981	Bruges	François Primel	Robert Collet	Jim Mullion
1982	Lou Pescadou (DH)	Denis Bailliez	Jack Barbe	Mrs Jean Muller
1982	Salute (DH)	François Primel	Robert Collet	Mrs Daniel Bertrand
1983	Oblat	Alain Chelet	Jacques Ortet	Mrs Aime Laveyron
1984	Doelan	Jean-Yves Artu	Yann-Marie Porzier	René Aebischer
1985	Guchen	Diego Roussel	Jacques Ortet	Mrs Francis Loizon
1986	Nestor Burma	Denis Leblond	Gérard Collet	Sylvain Chouraqui
1987	Katko	Jean-Yves Beaurain	Bernard Sécly	Pierre de Montesson
1988	Frappeuse	Bruno Jollivet	Jacques Ortet	Henri Georgel
1989	Tito l'Effronte	Franck Smeulders	Jean Dasque	Jean Dasque
1990	Ucello II	Adam Kondrat	François Doumen	Marquesa de Moratalla
1991	As des Carres	Loïc Manceau	Jean Dasque	Claude Cohen
1992	Old River	Jean-Pierre Godet	A. Sagot	Claude Cohen
1993	Earl Grant	Jean-Yves Beaurain	Bernard Sécly	Bernard Boutboul
1994	Parika	Philippe Sourzac	Guillaume Macaire	Alain Ranson
1995	Ytalsa Royale	Cyrille Gombeau	Bernard Barbier	Gilbert Gallot
1996	Kizitca	Christophe Pieux	Jacques Ortet	Peter Baumgartner
1997	Vieux Beaufai	Pierre Bigot	Frédéric Danloux	Ecurie Siklos
1998	Valdance	Christophe Pieux	Jacques Ortet	Naji Pharaon
1999	Arlas	Stéphane Massinot	Thierry Civel	Ecurie Centrale
2000	Boisnoir	Pascal Marsac	Guy Chérel	Daniel Wildenstein
2001	Turgot	Dominique Bressou	J. Bertran de Balanda	Bryant / Jackson
2002	Karly Flight	Philippe Sourzac	Arnaud Chaillé-Chaillé	Patrick Boiteau
2003	Ice Mood	Philippe Sourzac	Arnaud Chaillé-Chaillé	Jean-Michel Bazire
2004	Cyrlight	Philippe Sourzac	Arnaud Chaillé-Chaillé	Sean Mulryan
2005	Bonbon Rose	Christophe Pieux	Arnaud Chaillé-Chaillé	Sean Mulryan
2006	Or Noir de Somoza	Christophe Pieux	Arnaud Chaillé-Chaillé	Sean Mulryan
2007	Remember Rose	Christophe Pieux	Jean-Paul Gallorini	Ernst Iten
2008	Oculi	Dean Gallagher	François-Marie Cottin	Detré / Filliette
2009	Rubi Ball	Christophe Pieux	Jacques Ortet	Mrs Patrick Papot
2010	Saint du Chenet	Régis Schmidlin	Marcel Rolland	Magalen Bryant
2011	Grand Charly	Sylvain Dehez	Thierry Civel	Jean-Paul Sénéchal
2012	Teejay Flying	Alain de Chitray	Thomas Trapenard	Fernando Pereira
2013	Storm of Saintly	Vincent Cheminaud	Guillaume Macaire	Jeannot Andt
2014	Fleur D'Ainay	Jacques Ricou	Philippe Peltier	Mme Patrick Papot
2015	Kotkikova	Jacques Ricou	Jean-Paul Gallorini	Ecurie Montesson
2016	Punch Nantais	Bertrand Lestrade	Guillaume Macaire	D Allard & F Turek
2017	Srehlighonn	Gaeten Masure	Francois Nicolle	Simon Munir, Isaac Souede & Francois Nicolle
2018	Whetstone	Bertrand Lestrade	Guillaume Macaire	Magalen O Bryant
2019	Goliath du Berlais	Bertrand Lestrade	Guillaume Macaire	Stephane Szwarc, Haras d'Etreham & Palmyr Racing
2020	Gardons Le Sourire (Note: The 2020 race was run at Compiegne Racecourse in June due to the COVID-19 pandemic in France)	Clement Lefebvre	Gabriel Leenders	Haras De Saint-Voir
2021	Le Listrac	Lucas Zuliani	Francois Nicolle	Sarl Carion E M M
2022	Altesse Du Berlais	Baptiste Le Clerc	Hector de Lageneste and Guillaume Macaire	G Caggiula, G Luyckx Et Al
2023	Juntos Ganamos	Felix de Giles	David Cottin	Margaux Cottin
2024	Kolokico	Nicolas Gauffenic	Emmanuel Clayeux	Lord Daresbury, Ecurie Mme Jacques Cypres & Nicolas Cypres

== See also ==
- List of French jump horse races
