= Prix La Haye Jousselin =

Steeplechase horse race in France

- Class: Group 1
- Location: Auteuil Racecourse; Paris, France
- Inaugurated: 1880
- Race type: Steeplechase
- Website: france-galop.com

Race information
- Distance: 5,500 metres (3m 3½f)
- Surface: Turf
- Track: Left-handed
- Qualification: Five-years-old and up
- Weight: 65 kg (5yo); 67 kg (6yo+); Allowances; 2 kg for mares
- Purse: €520,000 (2009); 1st: €234,000

Prix La Haye Jousselin
2025
Toscana Du Berlais	Kolokico	Gold Tweet

Previous years
2024
Gran Diose	Grandeur Nature	Juntos Ganamos
2023
Grandeur Nature	Gran Diose	Grand Oncle
2022
Figuero	Grandeur Nature	Poly Grandchamp
2021
Poly Grandchamp	Carriacou	Le Berry

2020-2011
2020
Docteur De Ballon	Feu Follet	Figuero
2019
Bipolaire	Ebonite	Carriacou
2018
Bipolaire	Saint Goustan Blue	Milord Thomas
2017
Bipolaire	Milord Thomas	Perfect Impulse
2016
Milord Thomas	Alary	Storm Of Saintly
2015
Milord Thomas	Saint Palois	Vezelay
2013
Shannon Rock	Saint Palois	Quart Monde
2012
Lagunak	Net Lovely	Shannon Rock
2011
Rubi Ball	Rhialco	Quarouso

2010-2002
2010
Rubi Ball	Mid Dancer	Doumaja
2009
Remember Rose	Princesse D'Anjou	Dayladam
2008
Remember Rose	Musica Bella	Louping D'Ainay
2007
Mid Dancer	Princesse D'Anjou	Lord Carmont
2006
Princesse D'Anjou	Louping D'Ainay	Lord Carmont
2005
Golden Flight	Sybellius D'Artaix	L'Ami
2004
Turgot	Hespoir D'Aurelie	Grand Cyborg
2003
Batman Senora	Rougenoir	Kilefou D'Airy
2002
Sunny Flight	Cerilly	Innox

The Prix La Haye Jousselin is a Group 1 steeplechase in France which is open to horses aged five years or older. It is run at Auteuil over a distance of 5,500 metres (about 3 miles and 3½ furlongs), and it is scheduled to take place each year in November.

The race typically includes horses that also participate in the Grand Steeple-Chase de Paris, France's most prestigious steeplechase. The course features twenty-two obstacles, with the most challenging being the Rail-Ditch and Fence, also known as the Juge de Paix.

== History ==
The event was established in 1880, and it was originally called the Prix de la Croix de Berny. It was initially contested over 6,000 metres, and it was cut to 5,600 metres in 1893. It was given its present title in 1903, and at the same time it was shortened by 100 metres.

Its new title was in memory of Edmond de La Haye Jousselin (1839–1903), a founding member of the Société des Steeple-Chases de France. As a steward and administrator of this organisation, La Haye Jousselin assisted with the design of Auteuil's racetracks, and he oversaw the construction of its obstacles. He later became the vice-chairman, a position he occupied until his death.

The Prix La Haye Jousselin was abandoned throughout World War I, with no running from 1914 to 1918. It was cancelled once during World War II, in 1939. It was cut to 4,500 metres in 1940, and it was restored to 5,500 metres in 1941.

Notable winners of the Prix La Haye Jousselin include The Fellow, a subsequent winner of the Cheltenham Gold Cup, and Al Capone II, a repeat winner in the 1990s. The latter achieved the extraordinary feat of winning the race seven times in successive years from 1993 to 1999. Many winners have also achieved victory in the Grand Steeple-Chase de Paris, which is held at the same venue in late May. The most recent of these is Gran Diose, the winner of the latter event in 2024.

== Records ==
Leading jockey (8 wins):

- Jean-Yves Beaurain – Katko (1989), Al Capone II (1993, 1994, 1995, 1996, 1997, 1998, 1999)

Leading trainer (9 wins):

- Bernard Sécly – Katko (1989), Al Capone II (1993, 1994, 1995, 1996, 1997, 1998, 1999), El Paso III (2001)

Leading owner (8 wins):

- Robert Fougedoire – Al Capone II (1993, 1994, 1995, 1996, 1997, 1998, 1999), El Paso III (2001)

== Winners since 1980 ==
Year	Winner	Age	Jockey	Trainer	Owner
1980	Car d'Azur	7	Denis Bailliez	Jack Barbe	Mrs Jean Muller
1981	Ardfern	8	Denis Leblond	Jean-Paul Gallorini	Daniel Wildenstein
1982	Jasmin II	7	Michel Chirol	André Fabre	Michel Thibault
1983	V'la Parame	8	Patrice Lemaire	Jack Barbe	Mrs Albert Aubaud
1984	Le Pontif	7	Bruno Jollivet	René Cherruau	Michelle Crossouard
1985	Le Pontif	8	Bruno Jollivet	René Cherruau	Michelle Crossouard
1986	Otage du Perche	6	Serge Bérard	Philippe Lamotte d'Argy	Philippe Lamotte d'Argy
1987	Aveu de Kervero	7	Jacques Morin	Carlos Lerner	Carlos Lerner
1988	Oteuil	8	Bruno Jollivet	René Cherruau	Mrs Raymond Saulais
1989	Katko	6	Jean-Yves Beaurain	Bernard Sécly	Pierre de Montesson
1990	The Fellow	5	Adam Kondrat	François Doumen	Marquesa de Moratalla
1991	Tito l'Effronte	6	Bruno Jollivet	Jean Dasque	Jean Dasque
1992	Ucello II	6	Christophe Aubert	François Doumen	Marquesa de Moratalla
1993	Al Capone II	5	Jean-Yves Beaurain	Bernard Sécly	Robert Fougedoire
1994	Al Capone II	6	Jean-Yves Beaurain	Bernard Sécly	Robert Fougedoire
1995	Al Capone II	7	Jean-Yves Beaurain	Bernard Sécly	Robert Fougedoire
1996	Al Capone II	8	Jean-Yves Beaurain	Bernard Sécly	Robert Fougedoire
1997	Al Capone II	9	Jean-Yves Beaurain	Bernard Sécly	Robert Fougedoire
1998	Al Capone II	10	Jean-Yves Beaurain	Bernard Sécly	Robert Fougedoire
1999	Al Capone II	11	Jean-Yves Beaurain	Bernard Sécly	Robert Fougedoire
2000	First Gold	7	Thierry Doumen	François Doumen	Marquesa de Moratalla
2001	El Paso III	9	Laurent Métais	Bernard Sécly	Robert Fougedoire
2002	Sunny Flight	8	Philippe Sourzac	Arnaud Chaillé-Chaillé	Patrick Boiteau
2003	Batman Senora	7	Cyrille Gombeau	Ian Williams	Georges Polinski
2004	Turgot	7	Laurent Métais	Jehan Bertran de Balanda	Bryant / Jackson
2005	Golden Flight	6	Jacques Ricou	Guillaume Macaire	John D. Cotton
2006	Princesse d'Anjou	5	Philip Carberry	François-Marie Cottin	Jean-Paul Sénéchal
2007	Mid Dancer	6	Cyrille Gombeau	Arnaud Chaillé-Chaillé	Sean Mulryan
2008	Remember Rose	5	Christophe Pieux	Jean-Paul Gallorini	Ernst Iten
2009	Remember Rose	6	Christophe Pieux	Jean-Paul Gallorini	Ernst Iten
2010	Rubi Ball	5	David Cottin	Jacques Ortet	Mme Patrick Papot
2011	Rubi Ball	6	David Cottin	Jacques Ortet	Mme Patrick Papot
2012	Lagunak	8	Jeremy Da Silva	Yannick Fouin	Charles-Hubert de Chaudenay
2013	Shannon Rock	7	David Cottin	Jean-Paul Gallorini	Mme Henri Devin
2014	Milord Thomas	5	Jacques Ricou	Dominique Bressou	Mme Magalen Bryant
2015	Milord Thomas	6	Jacques Ricou	Dominique Bressou	Mme Magalen Bryant
2016	Milord Thomas	7	Jacques Ricou	Dominique Bressou	Mme Magalen Bryant
2017	Bipolaire	6	Thomas Gueguen	Francois Nicolle	J Detre, F Seigneur & E Walsh
2018	Bipolaire	7	Jonathan Plouganou	Francois Nicolle	J Detre, F Seigneur & E Walsh
2019	Bipolaire	8	Gaetan Masure	Francois Nicolle	J Detre, F Seigneur & E Walsh
2020	Docteur De Ballon	8	Bertrand Lestrade	Louisa Carberry	Mme Robert Gasche-Luc
2021	Poly Grandchamp	9	Bertrand Lestrade	Francois Nicolle	Mme Patrick Papot
2022	Figuero	7	Angelo Zuliani	Francois Nicolle	Jacques Detre
2023	Grandeur Nature	7	Gaetan Masure	A Chaille-Chaille	Haras De Saint-Voir
2024	Gran Diose	8	Thomas Beaurain	Louisa Carberry	F & O Hinderze Racing & Luc Monnet
2025	Toscana Du Berlais	7	Pierre Dubourg	Arnaud Chaille-Chaille & Francois Pamart
2026	Kolokico	6	James Reveley	Emmanuel Clayeux

== Earlier winners ==
- 1880 - Basque
- 1881 - Basque
- 1882 - Vatan
- 1883 - Tant Mieux
- 1884 - Entraineur
- 1885 - Baudres
- 1886 - Rostrenen
- 1887 - La Vigne
- 1888 - Montgeroult
- 1889 - Bandmaster
- 1890 - no race
- 1891 - Silversmith
- 1892 - Mondeville
- 1893 - Le Rakos
- 1894 - Olifant
- 1895 - Turco
- 1896 - Solitaire
- 1897 - Marise
- 1898 - Prefet
- 1899 - Bucheron
- 1900 - Maragon
- 1901 - Killarney
- 1902 - Killarney
- 1903 - Bebe
- 1904 - Violon II
- 1905 - Dandolo
- 1906 - Cintra
- 1907 - Royal Visiteur
- 1908 - Pharaon
- 1909 - Sauveur
- 1910 - Sauveur
- 1911 - Trudon
- 1912 - Magicienne
- 1913 - Montagnard
- 1914–18 - no race
- 1919 - Cesar Auguste
- 1920 - Heros XII
- 1921 - Heros XII
- 1922 - L'Yser
- 1923 - Onyx II
- 1924 - Gorey
- 1925 - Vitrail
- 1926 - The Coyote
- 1927 - Maguelonne
- 1928 - Rhyticere
- 1929 - Heugon
- 1930 - La Granja
- 1931 - Millionnaire II
- 1932 - Andromaque II
- 1933 - Yarlas
- 1934 - Fleuret
- 1935 - Manteau de Savoie
- 1936 - Storm
- 1937 - Bao Dai
- 1938 - Siklos
- 1939 - no race
- 1940 - Jalgreya
- 1941 - Frere Victor
- 1942 - Merigo
- 1943 - Le Chevreuil
- 1944 - Merigo
- 1945 - Symbole
- 1946 - Fabiano
- 1947 - Meli Melo
- 1948 - Rideo
- 1949 - Meli Melo
- 1950 - Meli Melo
- 1951 - Rameau
- 1952 - Fifrelet
- 1953 - Diamant de Bourgogne
- 1954 - Le Phare
- 1955 - Quo Vadis
- 1956 - Hunorisk
- 1957 - Aredien
- 1958 - Meslay
- 1959 - Illuminee
- 1960 - Pirate IV
- 1961 - Azzemour II
- 1962 - Silfol
- 1963 - Liberty's
- 1964 - Caid II
- 1965 - Cresus
- 1966 - Weather Permitting
- 1967 - Meristria
- 1968 - Haroue
- 1969 - Huron
- 1970 - Ravageur
- 1971 - Samour
- 1972 - Jouventur
- 1973 - Klavier
- 1974 - Kashtan
- 1975 - Frederik
- 1976 - Tofano
- 1977 - Dom Helion
- 1978 - Great Mist
- 1979 - Sambristan

== See also ==
- List of French jump horse races
- Repeat winners of horse races
- Recurring events established in 1880 – this race is included under its original title, Prix de la Croix de Berny.
