= Prix Cambacérès =

Hurdle horse race in France

Prix Cambaceres
2025
Leopard Du Berlais	Bourbon Has	Shannon Maestro

Previous years
2024
Sain D'Esprit	Nietzsche Has	Six Figures
2023
Jigme	Leon Du Berlais	Kingland
2022
St Donats	Not Too Bad	Bolero
2021
Kyrov	Golden Son	Ain't Got Wings

2020-2011
2020
Theleme	Raffles Face	Baladin De Mesc
2019
Nirvana Du Berlais	Kool Has	For Fun
2018
Beaumec De Houelle	Pic D'Orhy	L'Autonomie
2017
Master Dino	Tunis	Pesk Ebrel
2016
De Bon Coeur	Invicter	Dolos
2015
Chimere Du Berlais	Indietir	Device
2014
Bonito Du Berlais	Champ De Bataille	Kotkikova
2013
Hippomene	Alabama Le Dun	Roll On Has
2012
Extreme Cara	Laristo	Carilo
2011
Esmondo	Blingless	Usual Suspects

2010-2000
2010
Tanais Du Chenet	Indian Daudaie	Twinlight
2009
Prince Oui Oui	Kauto Stone	St Nicolas D'Acy
2008
Long Run	Buck's Boum	Kalin Des Cotieres
2007
Don Lino	Othermix	Sherkan Du Berlais
2006
Royal Honor	Good Bye Simon	Parrain
2005
Tidal Fury	Card'son	Chiaro
2004
Kiko	Sol Roc	Don't Be Shy
2003
Maia Eria	Kauto Star	Il Manifico
2002
Royaleety	Nickname	Ladykish
2001
Kotkita	Burckhardt	Pussigny
2000
Katiki	Nom D'Une Pipe	Jet Des Pres

The Prix Cambacérès is a Group 1 hurdle race in France which is open to three-year-old horses. It is run at Auteuil over a distance of 3,600 metres (about 2 miles and 2 furlongs), and it is scheduled to take place each year in November.

== Winners ==
Year	Winner	Jockey	Trainer
2000	Katiki	Philippe Chevalier	Marcel Rolland
2001	Kotkita	Laurent Metais	Bernard Secly
2002	Royaleety	Christophe Pieux	Thierry Civel
2003	Maia Eria	Christophe Pieux	Yann Porzier
2004	Kiko	Philippe Sourzac	Arnaud Chaille-Chaille
2005	Tidal Fury	Dean Gallagher	Jonathan Jay
2006	Royal Honor	Sylvain Dehez	Yannick Fouin
2007	Don Lino	Christophe Pieux	Jean-Paul Gallorini
2008	Long Run	David Cottin	Guillaume Macaire
2009	Prince Oui Oui	David Berra	Philippe Peltier
2010	Tanais Du Chenet	Regis Schmidlin	Marcel Rolland
2011	Esmondo	Bertrand Lestrade	Guillaume Macaire
2012	Extreme Cara	Bertrand Thelier	Guy Cherel
2013	Hippomene	Christophe Soumillon	Jean-Paul Gallorini
2014	Bonito Du Berlais	Mathieu Carroux	Arnaud Chaille-Chaille
2015	Chimere Du Berlais	Ludovic Philipperon	Robert Collet
2016	De Bon Coeur	James Reveley	Francois Nicolle
2017	Master Dino	James Reveley	Guillaume Macaire
2018	Beaumec de Houelle	Pierre Dubourg	Arnaud Chaille-Chaille
2019	Nirvana du Berlais	Pierre Dubourg	Arnaud Chaille-Chaille
2020	Theleme	Thomas Coutant	Arnaud Chaille-Chaille
2021	Kyrov	Gwen Richard	Francois Nicolle
2022	St Donats	James Reveley	Hugo Merienne
2023	Jigme	Ludovic Philipperon	M Rolland
2024	Sain D'Esprit	Angelo Zuliani	Francois Nicolle
2025	Leopard Du Berlais	Johnny Charron	David Cottin
2026	Huron Bleu	Gabin Meunier	Dominique Bressou

== See also ==
- List of French jump horse races
