= Prix Alain du Breil =

Hurdle horse race in France

Prix Alain du Breil
2025
Kivala Du Berlais	Musique Maestro	Six Figures

Previous years
2024
Pistache Dore	Kingland	Kibboutz
2023
Gala Marceau	Losange Bleu	Zarak The Brave
2022
Hawai Du Berlais	West End Girl	Norville
2021
Hermes Baie	Martator	Raffles Face

2020-2011
2020
For Fun	James Du Berlais	Kool Has
2019
Feu Follet	Polirico	French Made
2018
Wildriver	Tunis	Master Dino
2017
Prince Ali	Bapaume	Dandy Mag
2016
Footpad	King's Socks	Beyond Henry
2015
Blue Dragon	Bosseur	Yoko
2014
Roll On Has	Liberte D'Aimer	Hippomene
2013
Diakali	Ptit Zig	Le Grand Luce
2012
Usual Suspects	Chegei Has	Blingless
2011
Tidara Angel	Katkovana	Monpilou

2010-2004
2010
Salder Roque	Bel La Vie	Prince Oui Oui
2009
Rendons Grace	Jumbo Rio	Avenue Marceau
2008
Grivette	Hurricane Fly	Quevega
2007
Good Bye Simon	Big Buck's	Drole De Drame
2006
Lina Drop	Clear Riposte	Card'son
2005
Strangely Brown	Royale Athenia	Aroldo
2004
Mesange Royale	Ma Royale	Maia Eria

The Prix Alain du Breil is a Group 1 hurdle race in France which is open to four-year-old horses. It is run at Auteuil over a distance of 3,900 metres (about 2 miles and 3½ furlongs), and it is scheduled to take place each year in May or June. It is the summer championship event for four year-old hurdlers, and is also known as Course de Haies d'Ete des Quatre Ans.

== Winners ==
Year	Winner	Jockey	Trainer
1995	Silbertal	Ray O'Brien	Jean-Paul Gallorini
1998	Le Coudray	Philippe Chevalier	Marcel Rolland
1999	Silver Top I	Thierry Majorcryk	Jean-Paul Gallorini
2000	N'Avoue Jamais	Thierry Majorcryk	Jean-Paul Gallorini
2001	Vic Toto	Laurent De La Rosa	Florence Forneron
2002	Great Love	Christophe Cheminaud	Philippe Boisgontier
2003	Nickname	Thierry Majorcryk	Jean-Paul Gallorini
2004	Mesange Royale	David Casey	Francois-Marie Cottin
2005	Strangely Brown	Ruby Walsh	Eric McNamara
2006	Lina Drop	Sylvain Dehez	Yannick Fouin
2007	Good Bye Simon	Benoit Delo	Thierry Doumen
2008	Grivette	Christophe Pieux	Francois-Marie Cottin
2009	Rendons Grace	Cyrille Gombeau	Guy Cherel
2010	Salder Roque	Cyrille Gombeau	Guy Cherel
2011	Tidara Angel	David Cottin	David Windrif
2012	Usual Suspects	Cyrille Gombeau	Guy Cherel
2013	Diakali	Ruby Walsh	Willie Mullins
2014	Roll On Has	Vincent Cheminaud	Jean-Paul Gallorini
2015	Blue Dragon	Vincent Cheminaud	Guy Cherel
2016	Footpad	Ruby Walsh	Willie Mullins
2017	Prince Ali	Kevin Nabet	Guillaume Macaire
2018	Wildriver	Benjamin Gelhay	Mathieu Pitart
2019	Feu Follet	Bertrand Lestrade	Guillaume Macaire
2020	For Fun (Note: The 2020 race was run at Compiegne Racecourse in June due to the COVID-19 pandemic in France)	Kevin Nabet	Guillaume Macaire
2021	Hermes Baie	Bertrand Lestrade	Francois Nicolle
2022	Hawai Du Berlais	Pierre Dubourg	Arnaud Chaillé-Chaillé
2023	Gala Marceau	Danny Mullins	Willie Mullins
2024	Pistache Dore	Johnny Charron	Daniela Mele
2025	Kivala Du Berlais	Felix de Giles	David Cottin
2026	Selma De Vary	Paul Townend	Willie Mullins

== See also ==
- List of French jump horse races
