= Prix Maurice Gillois =

Steeplechase horse race in France

Prix Maurice Gillois
2025
Leader Sport	La Palmeraie	Nirvalla

Previous years
2024
Kaadam	Kentucky Wood	Royal Saga
2023
Amy Du Kiff	Jazzy Senam	Jost
2022
Gessy Raiselle	Diamond Carl	In Love
2021
Let Me Love	Sel Jem	Gold Tweet

2020-2011
2020
Le Berry	Galleo Conti	Magrudy
2019
Figuero	Kapdam	Thrilling
2018
Cicalina	Epi Sacre	Eddy De Balme
2017
On The Go	Edward D'Argent	Srelighonn
2016
Carriacou	Sainte Turgeon	Paulougas
2015
So French	Kobrouk	Karelcytic
2014
Royale Flag	My Name Is Nick	Rasique
2013
Milord Thomas	Polidam	Square Beaujon
2012
Utopie Des Bordes	Fago	Symphonie D'Anjou
2011
Halley	Dumet	Le Tranquille

2010-2001
2010
Kauto Stone	Still Loving You	Lucky To Be
2009
Long Run	Rubi Ball	Royale Francois
2008
Oculi	Loulia	Queen Des Places
2007
Top Of The Sky	Remember Rose	Polar Rochelais
2006
Or Noir De Somoza	Scarlet Row	Forzy Origny
2005
Polivalente	Benefique	Nobel De Re

The Prix Maurice Gillois is a Group 1 steeplechase in France which is open to four-year-old horses. It is run at Auteuil over a distance of 4,400 metres (about 2 miles and 6 furlongs), and it is scheduled to take place each year in November. It is the championship race for four-year-old steeplechasers in France, and is also known as the Grand Steeple-Chase des Quatre Ans.

== Winners ==
Year	Winner	Jockey	Trainer
2000	Douze Douze	Benoit Gicquel	Guillaume Macaire
2001	Japhet	Benoit Gicquel	Guillaume Macaire
2002	Le Chablis	Boris Chameraud	Thomas Trapenard
2003	Ladykish	Thierry Doumen	François Doumen
2004	Cyrlight	Philippe Sourzac	Arnaud Chaille-Chaille
2005	Polivalente	Christophe Pieux	Arnaud Chaille-Chaille
2006	Or Noir De Somoza	Christophe Pieux	Arnaud Chaille-Chaille
2007	Top Of The Sky	Ray O'Brien	Sylvain Loeuillet
2008	Oculi	Dean Gallagher	Francois-Marie Cottin
2009	Long Run	David Cottin	Guillaume Macaire
2010	Kauto Stone	Christophe Pieux	Jean Bertran De Balanda
2011	Halley	David Cottin	Tom George
2012	Utopie Des Bordes	Paul Carberry	Francois-Marie Cottin
2013	Milord Thomas	Jacques Ricou	Dominique Bressou
2014	Royale Flag	Regis Schmidlin	Francois-Marie Cottin
2015	So French	James Reveley	Guillaume Macaire
2016	Carriacou	Stephane Paillard	Isabelle Pacault
2017	On The Go	James Reveley	Guillaume Macaire
2018	Cicalina	Bertrand Lestrade	Guillaume Macaire
2019	Figuero	Angelo Zuliani	Francois Nicolle
2020	Le Berry	Kevin Nabet	David Cottin
2021	Let me Love	Olivier Jouin	William Menuet
2022	Gessy Raiselle	James Reveley	David Cottin
2023	Amy Du Kiff	Leo-Paul Brechet	Gabriel Leenders
2024	Kaadam	Gaetan Masure	Arnaud Chaille-Chaille
2025	Leader Sport	Leo-Paul Brechet	Daniela Mele
2026	Metronomique	James Reveley	Noel George & Amanda Zetterholm

== See also ==
- List of French jump horse races
