= Long Run (horse) =

French-bred Thoroughbred racehorse

- Racing silks of Robert Waley-Cohen
- Sire: Cadoudal
- Grandsire: Green Dancer
- Dam: Libertina
- Damsire: Balsamo
- Sex: Gelding
- Foaled: 2005
- Country: France
- Colour: Bay/Brown
- Breeder: Mrs Marie-Christine Gabeur
- Owner: Robert Waley-Cohen
- Trainer: Nicky Henderson
- Record: 34: 15-7-6
- Earnings: £1,542,715

Major wins
- Prix Cambacérès (2008); Prix Maurice Gillois (2009); Feltham Novices' Chase (2009); Kingmaker Novices' Chase (2010); King George VI Chase (2011 (January), 2012); Cheltenham Gold Cup (2011); Denman Chase (2012)

Long Run is a retired National Hunt racehorse owned by Robert Waley-Cohen and trained during his racing career by Nicky Henderson in Great Britain and later by his owner.

== Racing career ==
In January 2011, ridden by amateur jockey Sam Waley-Cohen, the son of owner Robert Waley-Cohen, Long Run won the weather-delayed 2010 King George VI Chase at Kempton Park ahead of stablemate Riverside Theatre in second and Kauto Star, who was aiming to win the race for a record fifth time, in third. It was later found out that the champion was not at his best and had burst a blood vessel.

In March 2011, Long Run provided jockey Waley-Cohen and trainer Henderson with their first Cheltenham Gold Cup winner when he finished clear of previous winners Imperial Commander (who pulled up), Denman, and Kauto Star.

Returning in the 2011/12 National Hunt season, Long Run finished second to Kauto Star in both the Betfair Chase and the King George VI Chase, with Kauto Star winning the latter for the fifth time. Long Run had another clash with Kauto Star in the 2012 Cheltenham Gold Cup. He went into the race 7-4 favourite and with Kauto Star recovering from injury. However, both horses were upstaged by JP McManus' horse Synchronised, who won the race by 2 1/4 lengths from The Giant Bolster, with Long Run finishing in third.

On Boxing Day 2012, Long Run, who was the favourite at 15/8, won the King George VI Chase at Kempton. In what was described as "the most gripping finish of recent times," he beat Captain Chris by a neck on the line.

Long Run also participated in the 2014 Grand National at Aintree, but fell at the Valentine's Brook on the first circuit. He followed up with a ninth-placed finish in the Grand Steeple-Chase de Paris in May 2014 but was then off the course until March 2016 when he reappeared in a hunter chase at Carlisle. Long Run finished five of the seven runners and his retirement was announced after the race.
