= Felix de Giles =

British National Hunt jockey

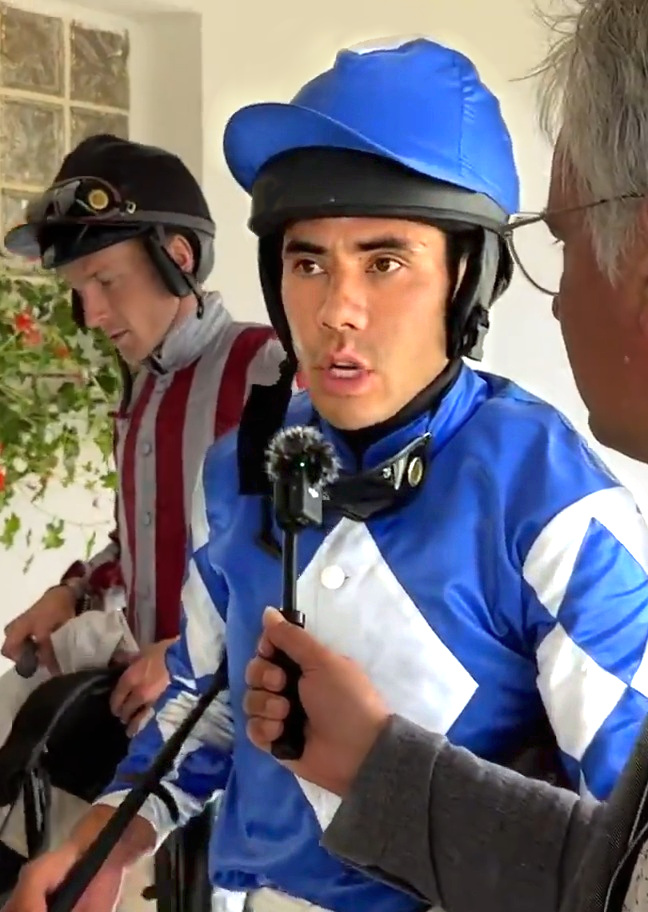
- de Giles in 2023

Personal information
- Born: February 1989 (age 37) Stanton Fitzwarren
- Occupation: Jockey

Horse racing career
- Sport: Horse racing

Significant horses
- Andytown, Easysland, Juntos Ganamos

Felix de Giles (born February 1989) is a Grade 1 winning British jockey who has been based in France since 2015 and competes in races over jumps. In 2023 he was crowned champion French jump jockey.

== Background ==
De Giles grew up in Stanton Fitzwarren, near Swindon in Wiltshire, where his father trained horses. He started riding at a young age and competed in show jumping and pony racing, winning the pony racing championship in 2004. He attended Highworth Warneford School until he was sixteen and then studied for A-levels in the sixth form at Farmor's School, Fairford. Whilst still at school, he rode out for his father and local trainer John Manners. He rode his first point-to-point winner on the Manners-trained Hi Rudolph in March 2005 and had his first ride under rules in a hunters' chase at Cheltenham the following month, coming fourth on Father Jim, trained by his father.

== Career as a jockey ==
After completing his A-levels, de Giles joined the yard of Nicky Henderson at Lambourn as conditional jockey. At the 2009 Cheltenham Festival he won the Martin Pipe Conditional Jockeys' Handicap Hurdle on 25/1 Andytown for Martin Henderson.

De Giles rode about 250 winners in Britain before moving to France in 2015 to ride as stable jockey at the yard of trainer Emmanuel Clayeux in Vaumas. After several seasons with Clayeux, he went free-lance. He won his first Grade race in April 2019, on Docteur De Ballon for Louisa Carberry in the Grade 3 Prix Ingre Chase at Auteuil Racecourse. He has ridden twice in the Grand National at Aintree and on both occasions completed the course. In 2012 he came thirteenth on Neptune Equester for Brian Ellison and in 2023 he came seventh on Roi Mage for Patrick Griffin.

In May 2023, de Giles achieved his first Grade 1 win, riding Juntos Ganamos to victory in the Prix Ferdinand Dufaure for David Cottin. That season, he also won a Grade 2 and eight Grade 3 races. He finished the year with 92 winners and was crowned champion jump jockey of France.

== Personal life ==
Outside of racing, de Giles participates in other sports, including boxing, and goes to rock concerts. In 2023 he married Orane Hurstel.

== Major wins ==
France

- Prix Alain du Breil - (1) - Kivala Du Berlais (2025)
- Prix Ferdinand Dufaure - (1) - Juntos Ganamos (2023)
