= Troytown (horse) =

Irish-bred Thoroughbred racehorse

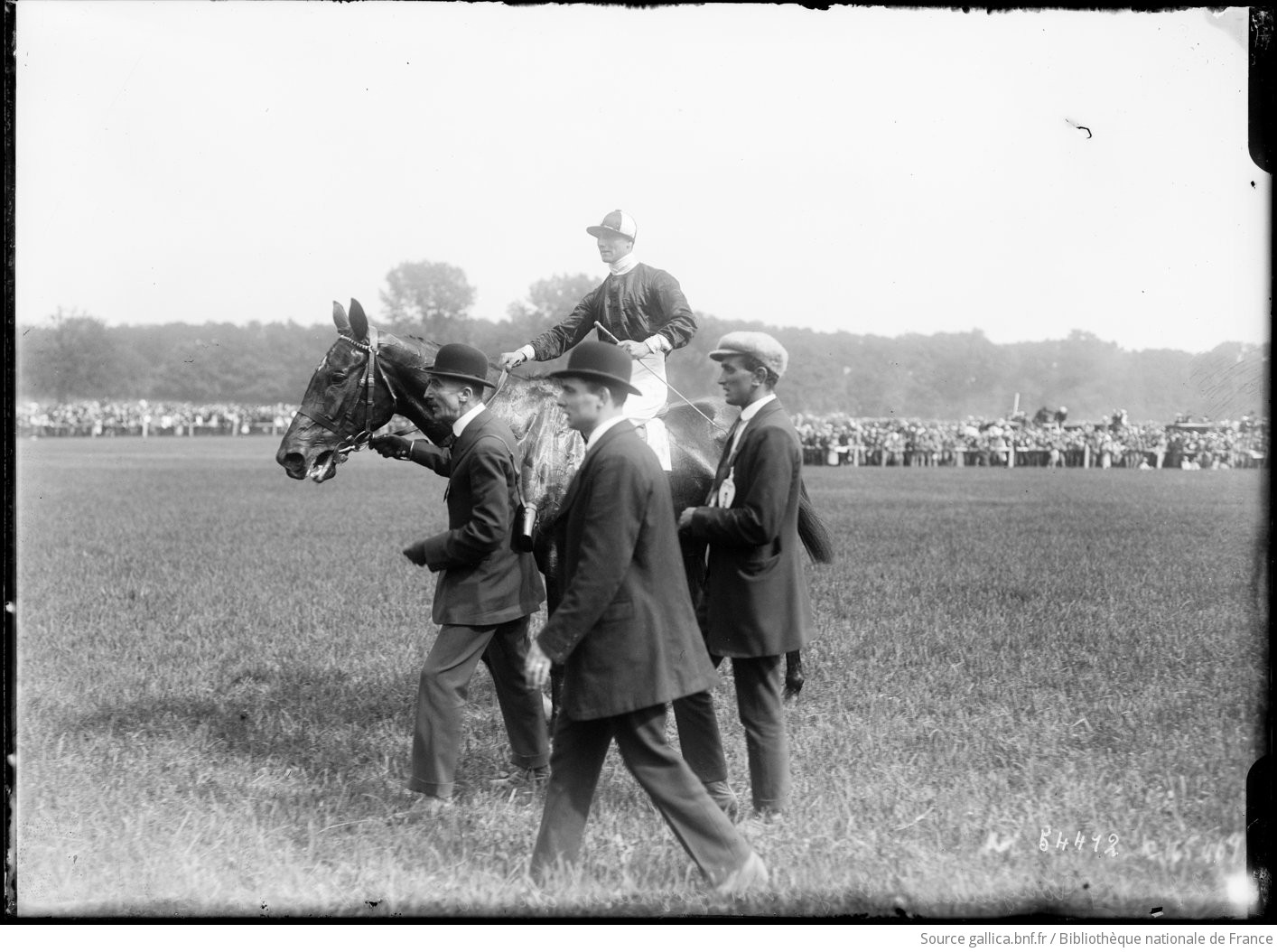
- June 22, 1919, at Auteuil
- Sire: Zria
- Grandsire: Cyllene
- Dam: Diane
- Damsire: Ascetic
- Sex: Gelding
- Foaled: 1913
- Country: Ireland
- Colour: Brown
- Owner: Thomas Collins-Gerard
- Trainer: Algernon Anthony

Major wins
- Aintree Champion Chase (1919); Grand Steeple-Chase de Paris (1919); Grand National (1920)

Troytown (1913–1920) was a racehorse regarded as one of the greatest early 20th century National Hunt performers along with Jerry M. His career was cut short by a fatal fall in the 1920 Grand Steeple-Chase de Paris. The habit of bludgeoning his way through fences, which caused the accident, had long been with Troytown. When he won the 1920 Grand National, he almost carted his amateur jockey Jack Anthony round the track and survived two mistakes. Before that, he had won once in his native Ireland, taken the Champion Chase at Aintree in 1919 and made every yard to win the Grand Steeple-Chase de Paris that season. Troytown was ridden by Anthony Escott when he won the Grand Steeple Chase de Paris in 1919. Escott had ridden third in the English Grand National in that same year on a horse called Pollen. The winner was Ernie Piggot on Poethlyn. Both of these horses were trained by Harry Escott at his stables in Lewes. He was Anthony Escott's father.

Troytown is buried in the Cimetière des Chiens et Autres Animaux Domestiques in Paris, France.
