= Gemix =

French Thoroughbred racehorse

Gémix
- Breed: Thoroughbred
- Sire: Carlotamix
- Grandsire: Linamix
- Dam: Ges
- Damsire: Hours After
- Sex: Stallion
- Foaled: 08/02/2008
- Died: 2022; Angers, France
- Country: France
- Colour: Chestnut
- Breeder: Yves Fremiot & Patrick Dufreche
- Owner: F. Teboul & M. Haski
- Racing colours: rouge étoile verte manche vertes toque rouge étoile verte
- Trainer: Nicolas Bertan de Balanda
- Jockey: David Cottin
- Earnings: 1023180 €

Major wins
- Grande Course de Haies d'Auteuil (Gr1) in 2013 and 2014
- Last updated on 13/06/2016

Gemix was a racehorse trained by Nicolas Bertan de Balanda. Gemix won the Grande Course de Haies d'Auteuil (Gr1) in 2013 and 2014.

Gemix died after suffering a spinal injury while on stallion duties at Haras du Lion stud in France.
