= Kauto Star Novices' Chase =

Steeplechase horse race in Britain

Kauto Star Novices' Chase
2025
Kitzbuhel	Thomas Mor	Wendigo

Previous years
2024
The Jukebox Man	Hyland	Masaccio
2023
Il Est Francais	Hermes Allen	Kilbeg King
2022
Thyme Hill	McFabulous	Mortlach
2021
Bravemansgame	Ahoy Senor	Kiltealy Briggs

2020-2011
2020
Shan Blue	The Big Breakaway	If The Cap Fits
2019
Slate House	Black Op	Danny Whizzbang
2018
La Bague Au Roi	Topofthegame	Santini
2017
Black Corton	Elegant Escape	West Approach
2016
Royal Vacation	Virgilio	Amore Alato
2015
Tea For Two	Southfield Royale	Native River
2014
Coneygree	Warden Hill	Virak
2013
Annacotty	Green Flag	Third Intention
2012
Dynaste	Hadrian's Approach	Third Intention
2011
Grands Crus	Silviniaco Conti	Bobs Worth

2010-2001
2009
Long Run	Tazbar	Ogee
2008
Breedsbreeze	Massini's Maguire	Hold Em
2007
Joe Lively	Here's Johnny	Silverburn
2006
Ungaro	Boychuk	Knowhere
2005
Darkness	Zabenz	Bewleys Berry
2004
Ollie Magern	Trabolgan	Quazar
2003
Strong Flow	Ballycassidy	Rule Supreme
2002
Jair Du Cochet	Le Sauvignon	Bold Investor
2001
Maximize	Innox	Katarino

2000-1996
2000
Bacchanal	Take Control	Shotgun Willy
1999
Gloria Victis	Zafarabad	Mister One
1998
Lord of the River	Spendid	King of Sparta
1997
Fiddling The Facts	Forest Ivory	Ottowa
1996
Djeddah	Solomon's Dancer	Aardwolf

The Kauto Star Novices' Chase is a Grade 1 National Hunt steeplechase in Great Britain which is open to horses aged four years or older. It is run at Kempton Park over a distance of about 3 miles (4,828 metres), and during its running there are eighteen fences to be jumped. The race is for novice chasers, and it is scheduled to take place each year during the King George VI Chase meeting on Boxing Day. The race was originally known as the Feltham Novices' Chase. The 2012 running additionally carried the name of Kauto Star (a winner of the King George VI Chase on five occasions) pending a permanent change of name. The permanent name change was confirmed by the BHA in July 2013.

Lizzie Kelly's victory on Tea For Two in the 2015 renewal made her the first female jockey to win a Grade One race in Britain.

== Records ==
Leading jockey since 1975 (3 wins):

- Richard Dunwoody – Von Trappe (1985), Sparkling Flame (1990), Mutare (1991)
- Mick Fitzgerald - Fiddling the Facts (1997), Bacchanal (2000), Ungaro (2006)
- Tony McCoy - Gloria Victis (1999), Maximize (2001), Darkness (2005)

Leading trainer since 1975 (5 wins):

- Nicky Henderson – Sparkling Flame (1990), Mutare (1991), Fiddling the Facts (1997), Bacchanal (2000), Long Run (2009)
- Paul Nicholls - See More Indians (1993), Strong Flow (2003), Breedsbreeze (2008), Black Corton (2017), Bravemansgame (2021)

== Winners ==
Year	Winner	Age	Jockey	Trainer
1975	Nagari	6	John Francome	Peter Cundell
1976	Never Rock	7	Bill Smith	Fulke Walwyn
1977	The Dealer	7	John Francome	Fred Winter
1978	Jack Madness	6	George Sloan (Note: amateur jockey)	Josh Gifford
1979	Sugarally	6	David Goulding	George Fairbairn
1980	Two Swallows	7	Bob Davies	Roddy Armytage
1981	Abandoned due to frost
1982	Gallaher	6	Bill Smith	Fulke Walwyn
1983	Duke of Milan	6	Peter Scudamore	Nick Gaselee
1984	Catch Phrase	6	Richard Rowe	Josh Gifford
1985	Von Trappe	8	Richard Dunwoody	Michael Oliver
1986	Aherlow	6	Ronnie Beggan	Simon Christian
1987	Twin Oaks	7	Paul Croucher	David Murray Smith
1988	Sir Blake	7	Brendan Powell	David Elsworth
1989	French Goblin	6	Peter Hobbs	Josh Gifford
1990	Sparkling Flame	6	Richard Dunwoody	Nicky Henderson
1991	Mutare	6	Richard Dunwoody	Nicky Henderson
1992	Dakyns Boy	7	Peter Scudamore	Nigel Twiston-Davies
1993	See More Indians	6	Graham Bradley	Paul Nicholls
1994	Brownhall	6	Adrian Maguire	David Nicholson
1995	Abandoned due to frost
1996	Djeddah	5	Adam Kondrat	François Doumen
1997	Fiddling the Facts	6	Mick Fitzgerald	Nicky Henderson
1998	Lord of the River	6	Jamie Osborne	Oliver Sherwood
1999	Gloria Victis	5	Tony McCoy	Martin Pipe
2000	Bacchanal	6	Mick Fitzgerald	Nicky Henderson
2001	Maximize	7	Tony McCoy	Henrietta Knight
2002	Jair du Cochet	5	Jacques Ricou	Guillaume Macaire
2003	Strong Flow	6	Ruby Walsh	Paul Nicholls
2004	Ollie Magern	6	Carl Llewellyn	Nigel Twiston-Davies
2005 (Note: The 2005 running took place at Sandown as Kempton was closed for redevelopment)	Darkness	6	Tony McCoy	Charles Egerton
2006	Ungaro	7	Mick Fitzgerald	Keith Reveley
2007	Joe Lively	8	Joe Tizzard	Colin Tizzard
2008	Breedsbreeze	6	Ruby Walsh	Paul Nicholls
2009	Long Run	4	Sam Waley-Cohen	Nicky Henderson
2010	Abandoned due to snow
2011	Grands Crus	6	Tom Scudamore	David Pipe
2012	Dynaste	6	Tom Scudamore	David Pipe
2013	Annacotty	5	Ian Popham	Martin Keighley
2014	Coneygree	7	Nico de Boinville	Mark Bradstock
2015	Tea For Two	6	Lizzie Kelly	Nick Williams
2016	Royal Vacation	6	Paddy Brennan	Colin Tizzard
2017	Black Corton	6	Bryony Frost	Paul Nicholls
2018	La Bague Au Roi	7	Richard Johnson	Warren Greatrex
2019	Slate House	7	Robbie Power	Colin Tizzard
2020	Shan Blue	6	Harry Skelton	Dan Skelton
2021	Bravemansgame	6	Harry Cobden	Paul Nicholls
2022	Thyme Hill	8	Tom O'Brien	Philip Hobbs
2023	Il Est Francais	5	James Reveley	Noel George & Amanda Zetterholm
2024	The Jukebox Man	6	Ben Jones	Ben Pauling
2025	Kitzbuhel	5	Paul Townend	Willie Mullins

== See also ==
- Horse racing in Great Britain
- List of British National Hunt races
