= West Properties =

Property company of the United Kingdom

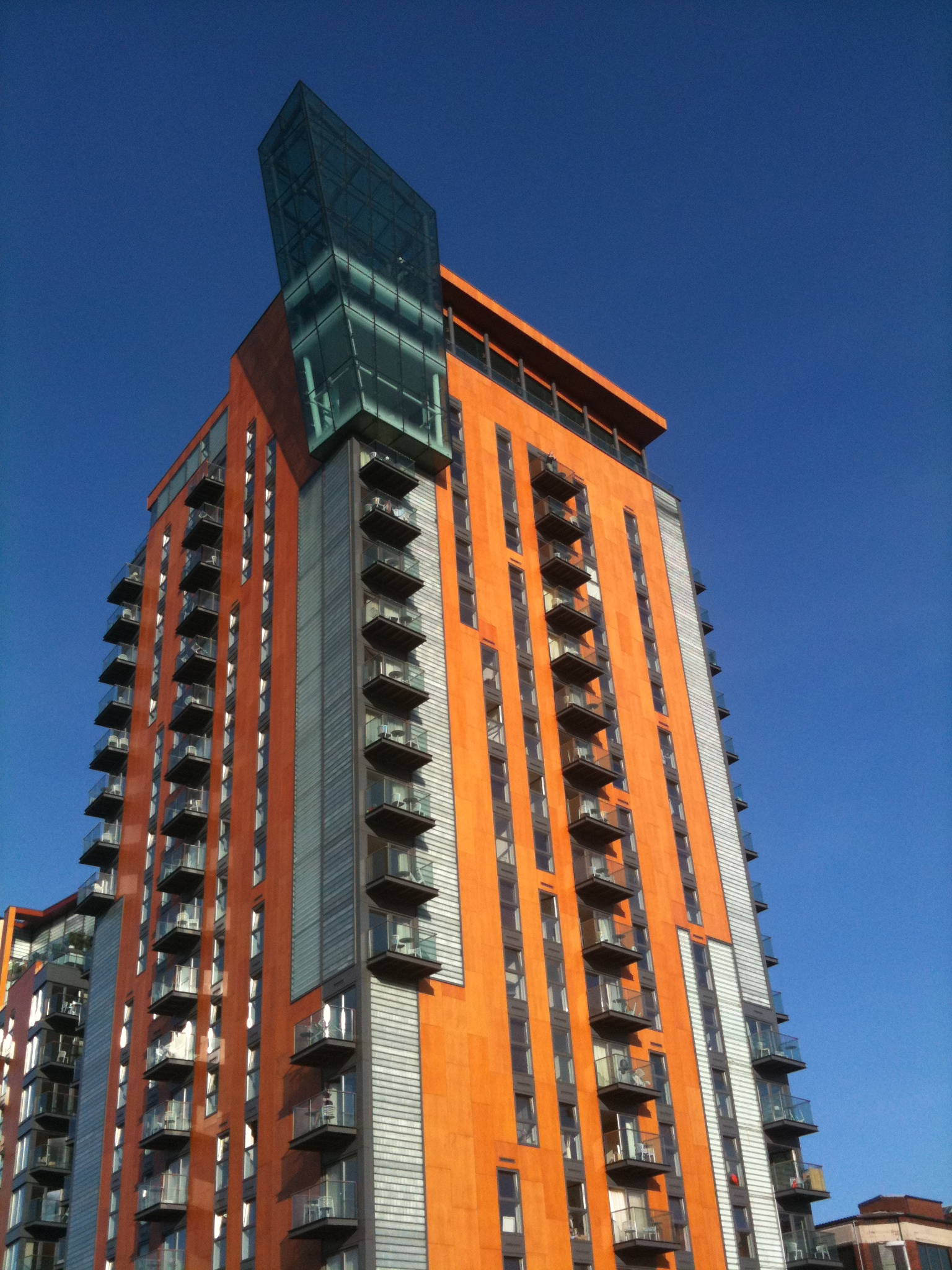
Skyline Central, Manchester City Centre

West Properties (UK) Ltd is a United Kingdom based property development company. The company focuses on high-end development projects, including Skyline Central, Lumiere, and Vivo in Manchester. Revenue for the 2008 fiscal year fell from £13.9m, down sharply from £26m the previous year.

In their 2012 book, The Untouchables: The People who Helped Wreck Ireland, Shane Ross and Nick Webb note that West Properties was set up and is run by Donal Mulryan, who used to work for Ballymore Group, which is run by his brother Sean Mulryan.

== Skyline Central ==
Skyline Central is a 207 feet (63 m) tall, 20-storey apartment complex in Manchester's Northern Quarter. The building's design has been negatively received by architectural critics. In his 2011 book A Guide to the New Ruins of Great Britain, Owen Hatherley described the building as "a car-crash of 'luxury' new-build clichés… the mess of materials, the inept patterning, the glass protrusion at the top, the nails-down-blackboard yellow is all so awful that we were left incredulous."
