= France Galop =

Horse racing governing body in France

- France Galop — Société d'encouragement pour l'amélioration des races de chevaux de galop en France
- Predecessor: Société d'Encouragement et des Steeple-Chases de France; Société de Sport de France; Société Sportive d'Encouragement
- Formation: May 3, 1995; 31 years ago
- Type: Declared association; parent society for flat and jump racing
- Headquarters: Immeuble Themis, 15 boulevard de Douaumont, Paris
- Region served: France
- President: Guillaume de Saint-Seine
- Main organ: Board of directors
- Staff: 500–999 (2023)
- Website: www.france-galop.com

France Galop is the governing body of flat and jump horse racing in France. It is one of the two parent societies of French racing, the other being Le Trot, which governs trotting; together with the regional federations and the other racing societies they make up the Fédération nationale des courses hippiques.

== History ==
France Galop was formed on 3 May 1995 by the amalgamation of three older societies: the Société d'Encouragement et des Steeple-Chases de France, the Société de Sport de France and the Société Sportive d'Encouragement. The owner and breeder Jean-Luc Lagardère was elected its first president.

The new body was declared as an association later that month, its creation being published in the Journal officiel on 31 May 1995.

== Status and governance ==
France Galop is a non-profit association, declared under the French law on associations of 1901 and registered under the name France Galop — Société d'encouragement pour l'amélioration des races de chevaux de galop en France. Its registered office is in the Immeuble Themis, boulevard de Douaumont, in the 17th arrondissement of Paris, and it employed between 500 and 999 people in 2023.

A board of twelve directors runs the association, and a committee represents owners, breeders, trainers, jockeys and the other participants in French racing. Guillaume de Saint-Seine has been president since 12 December 2023, when he was elected to a four-year term.

== Responsibilities ==
What a parent society must do is set out in the decree of 5 May 1997 on racing societies and the pari mutuel. France Galop answers for the whole of the flat and jump branch. It proposes the code of racing for its specialty to the minister for agriculture, whose approval is taken as given if he says nothing for two months, and it sees that the code is kept, ruling on the difficulties referred to it by the stewards or by the minister.

It also draws up the racing programme and the draft calendars, which pass to the national federation for transmission to the minister; sets the rates of the premiums paid to breeders and pays them; distributes the subsidies for prize money among the racing societies; and produces and distributes the data and pictures of its meetings.

Licences are the part of the work where the State is closest. France Galop issues the authorisations to run, to train and to ride, but only after a favourable opinion from the minister of the interior, given in view of the risk of public disorder; and it must suspend or withdraw an authorisation if the minister maintains a request to that effect after a hearing.

Its registered objects, as filed with the ministry of the interior, cover the organisation of flat races, the taking of bets on them on its racecourses, online and away from the course, and its responsibility for the whole branch.

== Racecourses and races ==
France Galop reports that it stages more than 6,800 flat and jump races a year at more than 130 racecourses. It manages five of them directly: ParisLongchamp, Auteuil, Chantilly, Saint-Cloud and Deauville-La Touques, together with training centres at Chantilly, Maisons-Laffitte and Deauville.

Among the races it organises are the Prix de l'Arc de Triomphe, the Prix du Jockey Club, the Prix de Diane and the Grand Steeple-Chase de Paris.

== Breeding and integrity ==
The improvement of French racehorse breeding is one of the association's stated purposes. It supports breeding and training through the prize money and premiums paid to owners and breeders, and the racing programme itself serves to select horses for the stud.

France Galop is also answerable for the integrity of racing and for anti-doping control, with more than 12,000 samples taken from horses each year.

== Betting ==
Betting away from the racecourse is not carried on by France Galop itself. Under the decree, the racing societies authorised to take mutuel bets entrust that business to an economic interest grouping formed between them, which the decree names Pari mutuel urbain; France Galop and Le Trot are its principal members.

In 2018 the Cour des comptes examined the arrangement, describing French racing as resting on a double monopoly and noting that the two parent societies had often pursued strategies that did not cooperate.
