= Friendship (horse) =

Japanese Thoroughbred racehorse

Friendship フレンドシップ
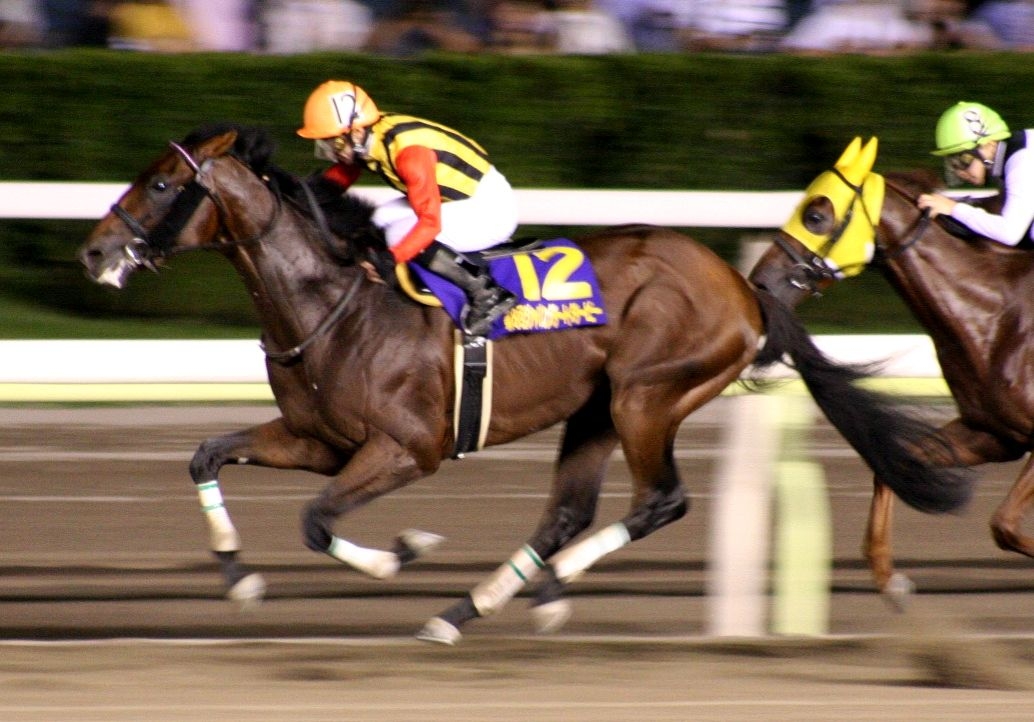
- Friendship in 2006 at the Japan Dirt Classic
- Breed: Thoroughbred
- Sire: French Deputy
- Grandsire: Deputy Minister
- Dam: Friendly Beauty
- Damsire: Stalwart
- Sex: Stallion
- Foaled: May 5, 2003
- Country: Japan
- Colour: Bay
- Breeder: Shadai Farm
- Owner: Teruya Yoshida
- Racing colours
- Trainer: Katsuhiko Sumii
- Jockey: Hiroyuki Uchida; Hirofumi Shii
- Record: 15: 4-3-0
- Earnings: 95,759,000 JPY

Major wins
- Japan Dirt Derby (2006)
- Last updated on May 18, 2026

Friendship (フレンドシップ; foaled May 5, 2003) is a Japanese Thoroughbred Racehorse. In 2006, he won the 8th Japan Dirt Classic.

== Background ==
Friendship was foaled on May 5, 2003, by the Shadai Farm. He was a bay stallion by French Deputy out of Friendly Beauty by Fredaq. During his racing career, he was owned by Teruya Yoshida and trained by Katsuhiko Sumii.

== Racing career ==
Friendship made his debut in a turf maiden race at Sapporo Racecourse, ridden by Shinji Fujita, on August 21, 2005. He finished 7th in that race behind future Arima Kinen winner Matsurida Gogh. He was entered into two additional turf races later that year, but finished off the board in both.

In 2006, he was ridden by Marco Monteriso in a dirt maiden race at Kyoto Racecourse. Perhaps benefiting from the switch to dirt, the colt put up a commendable performance, finishing second by a neck. Friendship raced, without a break, on another dirt maiden race, and again took second place. After a one‑week break, he was sent to Kokura for another dirt maiden race, where he delivered his first victory. Following roughly a month of rest and training, he ran in and won an Allowance race at Hanshin Racecourse, beating the runner-up by 0.6 seconds. The following month he was entered into the Open class Fukuryu Stakes, taking the first place one again. Riding that momentum, he took on the Hyogo Championship in May. Although Friendship was considered the favourite to win, Grace Tiara, the winner of the previous year's Zen-Nippon Nisai Yushun, beat him by a neck.

Later that year he was entered into the Grade 1 Japan Dirt Classic, a race which had been won by his stablemate, Kane Hekili, the year prior. The stable requested the services of Hiroyuki Uchida—a renowned jockey based at the local Ohi Racecourse, who had already amassed numerous victories that year in inter-regional stakes races across the South Kanto circuit. Sent off as the second favorite behind Nike Earthwork, winner of the Unicorn Stakes, he settled in third place as Thank You Win, winner of the Haneda Hai, set the pace. He overtook Bamboo Ere, who had moved to the front from second position at the midway point of the straight, and went on to win by over a length. The victory marked his first graded stakes win, as well as his first Grade 1 win; It was also Uchida's first win in the race, and trainer Katsuhiko Sumii's second consecutive victory.

Following his victory in the Japan Dirt Derby, preparations began for his participation on the Derby Grand Prix (now merged with the Kozukata Sho). however, he was diagnosed with a bowed tendon, and entered an extended hiatus. He returned to racing after one year and three months, entering the Aldebaran Stakes On October 28, 2007 where finished 15th in a field of 16 horses. He went on to contest five more open-class races, but finished nearly last in all of them. His registration as a racehorse was finally canceled on September 17, 2008.

In his retirement, he did not stand at stud, and instead became a riding horse.

=== Statistics ===
The following form is based on information from JBIS-Search and netkeiba.

| Date | Age | Racecourse | Name | Grade | Distance/Type | Field | Finished | Jockey | Time | Winner (2nd place) |
|---|---|---|---|---|---|---|---|---|---|---|
| August 21, 2005 | 2 | Sapporo | 2yo Debut | | Turf 1800m | 13 | 7th | Shinji Fujita | 1:54.9 | Matsurida Gogh |
| September 10, 2005 | 2 | Sapporo | 2yo Maiden race | | Turf 1500m | 14 | 12th | Shinji Fujita | 1:32.8 | Meine Giada |
| January 8, 2006 | 3 | Kyoto | 3yo Maiden race | | Dirt 1800m | 14 | 2nd | Marco Monteriso | 1:53.9 | Captain Vega |
| January 14, 2006 | 3 | Kyoto | 3yo Maiden race | | Dirt 1800m | 11 | 2nd | Marco Monteriso | 1:51.9 | Inspire |
| January 28, 2006 | 3 | Kokura | 3yo Maiden race | | Dirt 1700m | 11 | 1st | Marco Monteriso | 1:49.4 | (Meisho Shaft) |
| March 4, 2006 | 3 | Hanshin | 3yo Allowance | | Dirt 1800m | 13 | 1st | Yuga Kawada | 1:54.9 | (Sunrise Lexus) |
| April 2, 2006 | 3 | Nakayama | Fukuryu Stakes | OP | Dirt 1800m | 12 | 1st | Hirofumi Shii | 1:54.3 | (Marubutsu Lead) |
| May 4, 2006 | 3 | Sonoda | Hyogo CS | Jpn2 | Dirt 1870m | 11 | 2nd | Hirofumi Shii | 2:01.2 | Grace Tiara |
| July 12, 2006 | 3 | Ohi | Japan Dirt Derby | Jpn1 | Dirt 2000m | 14 | 1st | Hiroyuki Uchida | 2:06.1 | (Bamboo Ere) |
| October 28, 2007 | 4 | Kyoto | Aldebaran Stakes | OP | Dirt 1800m | 16 | 15th | Andreas Suborics | 1:54.7 | Wonder Speed |
| November 17, 2007 | 4 | Kyoto | Topaz Stakes | OP | Dirt 1800m | 16 | 15th | Andreas Suborics | 1:53.6 | Long Pride |
| December 8, 2007 | 4 | Nakayama | Shiwasu Stakes | OP | Dirt 1800m | 16 | 13th | Hayato Yoshida | 1:53.6 | Silence Boy |
| December 23, 2007 | 4 | Hanshin | Betelgeuse Stakes | OP | Dirt 2800m | 16 | 12th | Koshiro Take | 2:03.0 | Wonder Speed |
| July 27, 2008 | 5 | Niigata | Kanetsu Stakes | OP | Dirt 1800m | 13 | 11th | Yuichi Fukunaga | 1:53.2 | Meisho Shaft |
| August 10, 2008 | 5 | Kokura | KBC Hai | OP | Dirt 1700m | 15 | 13th | Shigefumi Kumazawa | 1:47.4 | Smart Falcon |

== Pedigree ==
Pedigree of Pedigree of Friendship (JPN) 2003
| Sire French Deputy (USA) 1992 | Deputy Minister; 1979 | Vice Regent; 1967 | Northern Dancer; 1961 |
| Sire French Deputy (USA) 1992 | Deputy Minister; 1979 | Vice Regent; 1967 | Victoria Regina; 1958 |
| Sire French Deputy (USA) 1992 | Deputy Minister; 1979 | Mint Copy; 1970 | Bunty's Flight; 1953 |
| Sire French Deputy (USA) 1992 | Deputy Minister; 1979 | Mint Copy; 1970 | Shakney; 1964 |
| Sire French Deputy (USA) 1992 | Mitterand; 1981 | Hold Your Peace; 1969 | Speak John; 1958 |
| Sire French Deputy (USA) 1992 | Mitterand; 1981 | Hold Your Peace; 1969 | Blue Moon; 1948 |
| Sire French Deputy (USA) 1992 | Mitterand; 1981 | Laredo Lass; 1971 | Bold Ruler; 1954 |
| Sire French Deputy (USA) 1992 | Mitterand; 1981 | Laredo Lass; 1971 | Fortunate Isle; 1959 |
| Dam Friendly Beauty (USA) 1992 | Stalwart; 1979 | Hoist the Flag; 1968 | Tom Rolfe; 1962 |
| Dam Friendly Beauty (USA) 1992 | Stalwart; 1979 | Hoist the Flag; 1968 | Wavy Navy; 1954 |
| Dam Friendly Beauty (USA) 1992 | Stalwart; 1979 | Yes Dear Maggy; 1972 | Iron Ruler; 1965 |
| Dam Friendly Beauty (USA) 1992 | Stalwart; 1979 | Yes Dear Maggy; 1972 | Yes Dear; 1963 |
| Dam Friendly Beauty (USA) 1992 | Fredaq; 1986 | Raise a Native; 1961 | Native Dancer; 1950 |
| Dam Friendly Beauty (USA) 1992 | Fredaq; 1986 | Raise a Native; 1961 | Raise You; 1946 |
| Dam Friendly Beauty (USA) 1992 | Fredaq; 1986 | Smart Steppin; 1981 | Nijinsky; 1967 |
| Dam Friendly Beauty (USA) 1992 | Fredaq; 1986 | Smart Steppin; 1981 | Smartaire; 1962 |
