= Grand Steeple-Chase de Paris =

- Class: Group 1
- Location: Auteuil Racecourse; Paris, France
- Inaugurated: 1874
- Race type: Steeplechase
- Sponsor: Gras Savoye
- Website: france-galop.com

Race information
- Distance: 6,000 metres
- Surface: Turf
- Track: Left-handed
- Qualification: Five-years-old and up
- Weight: 65 kg (5yo); 67 kg (6yo+); Allowances; 2 kg for mares
- Purse: €850,000 (2014); Distribution; 1st: 45%, 2nd: 22%, 3rd: 13% 4th: 9%, 5th: 5%, 6th: 3.5% 7th: 2.5%

Grand Steeple-Chase de Paris
2025
Diamond Carl	Kolokico	Grandeur Nature

Previous years
2024
Gran Diose	Grandeur Nature	General En Chef
2023
Rosario Baron	Gex	Starlet Du Mesnil
2022
Sel Jem	Gex	Franco De Port
2021
Docteur De Ballon	Carriacou	Galleo Conti

2020–2011
2020
Docteur De Ballon	Figuero	Feu Follet
2019
Carriacou	Bipolaire	Roi Mage
2018
On The Go	Perfect Impulse	Edward D'Argent
2017
So French	Perfect Impulse	Carriacou
2016
So French	Storm Of Saintly	Alary
2015
Milord Thomas	Shannon Rock	Saint Pistol
2014
Storm Of Saintly	Shannon Rock	Rhialco
2013
Bel La Vie	Shannon Rock	Mid Dancer
2012
Mid Dancer	Shannon Rock	Cokydal
2011
Mid Dancer	Rubi Ball	Polar Rochelais

2010–2001
2010
Polar Rochelais	Doumaja	Odeillo Du Mathan
2009
Remember Rose	Mid Dancer	Peldero
2008
Princesse D'Anjou	Padisha Soy	Mid Dancer
2007
Mid Dancer	Lord Carmont	Golden Flight
2006
Princesse D'Anjou	Rigoureux	Kotkijet
2005
Sleeping Jack	Ma Royale	Lord Carmont
2004
Kotkijet	Kamillo	Majadal
2003
Line Marine	Batman Senora	Urga
2002
Double Car	El Paso	Batman Senora
2001
Kotkijet	Ilare	El Paso

2000–1997
2000
Vieux Beaufai	Or Jack	First Gold
1999
Mandarino	Al Capone	Chant Royal
1998
First Gold	Saint Quenin	Chamberko
1997
Al Capone	Cand'Or	Gracky

The Grand Steeple-Chase de Paris is a Group 1 steeplechase in France which is open to horses aged five years or older. It is run at Auteuil over a distance of 6,000 metres, and during its running there are twenty-three fences to be jumped. It is the richest and most prestigious jumps race in France, and it is scheduled to take place each year in late May.

== History ==
The event was first run on 25 May 1874, and it was initially known as the Grand National de France. It was intended to be the French equivalent of the Grand National, a famous steeplechase in England. It was originally a handicap race, and it was open to horses aged four or older. The inaugural running was contested over 6,400 metres, and this was cut to 6,000 metres in its second year. The race was given its present title, the Grand Steeple-Chase de Paris, in 1876. Its distance was extended to 6,500 metres in 1889.

The race ceased to be a handicap in 1890, when a fixed "weight-for-age" system was introduced. Four-year-old horses were required to carry 62½ kg, five-year-olds 70 kg and older horses 72½ kg. A penalty of 6 kg was incurred on the previous winners of either this race or the Grand National. The basic weights were subsequently modified several times, and the penalty was gradually reduced until it was eventually discontinued.

The Grand Steeple-Chase de Paris was abandoned throughout World War I, with no running from 1915 to 1918. Its length was increased to 6,900 metres in 1924, and then restored to 6,500 metres in 1926. During World War II it was cancelled only once, in 1940. The minimum age of participating horses was raised to five in 1941. The race's distance was reduced to 6,300 metres in 1969, but it returned to 6,500 metres in 1971. The present format, 5,800 metres with twenty-three fences, was introduced in 1981.

The three most successful horses in the race's history are Hyeres III, Katko and Mid Dancer, who have all recorded three victories. A further ten have won the event twice, most recently Docteur de Ballon in 2020 and 2021. Two winners, Jerry M and Troytown, also achieved victory in the Grand National. Twelve foreign-trained horses have won, the latest of which was Mandarin in 1962, trained in England by Fulke Walwyn. The most recent foreign contender to finish in second place was the Irish-trained Captain Christy in 1975. The only American owner to win the race was Magalen O Bryant. She won the race 3 years in a row . 2015-2017

== Records ==
Leading jockey (5 wins):

- Jean Daumas – Xanthor (1959), Cousin Pons (1961), Hyères III (1964, 1965, 1966)

Leading trainer (9 wins):

- André Adèle

Leading owner (6 wins):

- Arthur Veil-Picard – Saint Caradec (1909), Blagueur II (1911), Ultimatum (1913), Fleuret (1935), Ingre (1937, 1939)

== Winners since 1949 ==
Year	Winner	Age	Jockey	Trainer	Owner
1949	Bouzoulou	6	René Beche	Daniel Lescalle	André de Fels
1950	Meli Melo	8	René Emery	William Head	Lucienne Aurousseau
1951	Nagara	9	Paul Hiéronimus	Noël Pelat	James P. Philipps
1952	Tournay	5	Pierre Delfarguiel	Robert Baril	Georges Courtois
1953	Pharamond	7	Marcel Maschio	Maurice Adèle	René Landon
1954	Orleans	7	Paul Péraldi	Valère Péraldi	Roger Nachbaum
1955	Farfatch	5	Claude Maire	Maurice Wallon	Edouard Gugenheim
1956	Necor	8	Henri T'Kint	Peter Head	Jean Etchepare
1957	Bonosnap	6	Guy Chancelier	Georges Pelat	Antonin Mourrut
1958	Sidere	7	Maurice Prod'homme	André Adèle	Baron Henry de Blonay
1959	Xanthor	9	Jean Daumas	Henri Gleizes	James de Rothschild
1960	Kingcraft	10	Gérard Philippeau	Peter Head	Jean de Marcilly
1961	Cousin Pons	5	Jean Daumas	Max Bonaventure	Jean Stern
1962	Mandarin	11	Fred Winter	Fulke Walwyn	Peggy Hennessy
1963	Loreto	9	René Kirchhofer	Pierre Pelat	Pierre Mercier
1964	Hyeres III	6	Jean Daumas	Léon Gaumondy	Max Gadala
1965	Hyeres III	7	Jean Daumas	Léon Gaumondy	Max Gadala
1966	Hyeres III	8	Jean Daumas	Léon Gaumondy	Mrs Léon Gaumondy
1967	Cacao	6	Gérard Migeon	Henri Gleizes	Baron P. de Posson
1968	Haroue	6	Bernard Vanheeghe	Léon Gaumondy	Jérôme Blum
1969	Huron	5	Claude Drieu	André Adèle	Bernard Larrousé
1970	Huron	6	Claude Drieu	André Adèle	Bernard Larrousé
1971	Pot d'Or	5	J. J. Declercq	Maurice Wallon	Robert Weill
1972	Morgex	8	Jean-Paul Ciravegna	Jean Sens	Mrs Michel Marie
1973	Giquin	6	Jean-Pierre Creveuil	André Adèle	María Félix Berger
1974	Chic Type	7	Jean-Pierre Renard	Jean-Jacques Beaumé	Gaston Murray
1975	Air Landais	5	Patrick Beyer	Georges Pelat	Mrs Marie-Claire Frolich
1976	Piomares	5	Guy Négrel	Domingo Perea	Joseph Kalda
1977	Corps a Corps	5	André Fabre	André Adèle	Baron Thierry van Zuylen
1978	Mon Filleul	5	Jean-Luc Llorens	Bernard Sécly	Jean-Claude Weill
1979	Chinco	7	Patrice Brame	Jean-Paul Gallorini	Giuseppe Campanella
1980	Fondeur	7	Marc Legrand	André Fabre	Albert Bézard
1981	Isopani	7	Alain Chelet	André Fabre	Pierre David
1982	Metatero	9	Bruno Jollivet	André Fabre	Gérard Margogne
1983	Jasmin II	8	Michel Chirol	André Fabre	Michel Thibault
1984	Brodi Dancer	6	Denis Leblond	Pierre Biancone	Mrs Claude Diallo
1985	Sir Gain	6	Serge Bérard	Léon Gaumondy	Mrs Louis Belotti
1986	Otage du Perche	6	Serge Bérard	Philippe Lamotte d'Argy	Philippe Lamotte d'Argy
1987	Oteuil	7	Bruno Jollivet	René Cherruau	Mrs Raymond Saulais
1988	Katko	5	Dominique Vincent	Bernard Sécly	Pierre de Montesson
1989	Katko	6	Jean-Yves Beaurain	Bernard Sécly	Pierre de Montesson
1990	Katko	7	Jean-Yves Beaurain	Bernard Sécly	Pierre de Montesson
1991	The Fellow	6	Dominique Vincent	François Doumen	Marquesa de Moratalla
1992	El Triunfo	6	Dominique Vincent	François Rohaut	Mrs Francis Montauban
1993	Ucello II	7	Christophe Aubert	François Doumen	Marquesa de Moratalla
1994	Ucello II	8	Christophe Aubert	François Doumen	Marquesa de Moratalla
1995	Ubu III	9	Philippe Chevalier	François Doumen	Marquesa de Moratalla
1996	Arenice	8	Philippe Sourzac	Guillaume Macaire	Mrs Francis Montauban
1997	Al Capone II	9	Jean-Yves Beaurain	Bernard Sécly	Robert Fougedoire
1998	First Gold	5	Thierry Doumen	François Doumen	Marquesa de Moratalla
1999	Mandarino	6	Philippe Chevalier	Marcel Rolland	Mrs Didier Ricard
2000	Vieux Beaufai	7	Pierre Bigot	Frédéric Danloux	Ecurie Siklos
2001	Kotkijet	6	Thierry Majorcryk	Jean-Paul Gallorini	Daniel Wildenstein
2002	El Paso III (Note: Double Car finished first in 2002, but he was subsequently disqualified after testing positive for a banned substance)	10	Laurent Métais	Bernard Sécly	Robert Fougedoire
2003	Line Marine	6	Christophe Pieux	Christophe Aubert	Mrs Georges Vuillard
2004	Kotkijet	9	Thierry Majorcryk	Jean-Paul Gallorini	Ecurie Wildenstein
2005	Sleeping Jack	6	Christophe Pieux	Jacques Ortet	Raoul Temam
2006	Princesse d'Anjou	5	Philip Carberry	François-Marie Cottin	Jean-Paul Sénéchal
2007	Mid Dancer	6	Cyrille Gombeau	Arnaud Chaillé-Chaillé	Sean Mulryan
2008	Princesse d'Anjou	7	Philip Carberry	François-Marie Cottin	Jean-Paul Sénéchal
2009	Remember Rose	6	Christophe Pieux	Jean-Paul Gallorini	Ernst Iten
2010	Polar Rochelais	7	Jerôme Zuliani	Patrice Quinton	Ecurie des Dunes
2011	Mid Dancer	10	Sylvain Dehez	Christophe Aubert	Pegasus Farms Ltd
2012	Mid Dancer	11	Sylvain Dehez	Christophe Aubert	Pegasus Farms Ltd
2013	Bel La Vie	7	Bertrande Lestrade	Guillaume Macaire	Mme Patrick Papot
2014	Storm Of Saintly	5	Vincent Cheminaud	Guillaume Macaire	Jeannot Andt
2015	Milord Thomas	6	Jacques Ricou	Dominique Bressou	Magalen O Bryant
2016	So French	5	James Reveley	Guillaume Macaire	Magalen O Bryant
2017	So French	6	James Reveley	Guillaume Macaire	Magalen O Bryant
2018	On The Go	5	James Reveley	Guillaume Macaire	Mme Patrick Papot
2019	Carriacou	7	Davy Russell	Isabelle Pacault	Ecurie Mirande
2020	Docteur de Ballon (Note: The 2020 race was run in October due to the COVID-19 pandemic in France)	8	Bertrand Lestrade	Louisa Carberry	Mme Robert Gasche-Luc
2021	Docteur de Ballon	9	Bertrand Lestrade	Louisa Carberry	Mme Robert Gasche-Luc
2022	Sel Jem	5	Johnny Charron	Hector de Lageneste & Guillaume Macaire	Mme Patrick Papot
2023	Rosario Baron	6	Johnny Charron	Daniele Mele	Frederic De Sousa & Mme Mauricette De Sousa
2024	Gran Diose	8	Clement Lefebvre	Louisa Carberry	F & O Hinderze Racing & Luc Monnet
2025	Diamond Carl	7	Clement Lefebvre	Francois Nicolle	Mme Patrick Papot
2026	Sel Jem	9	Johnny Charron	Hector de Lageneste & Guillaume Macaire	Mme Patrick Papot

== Earlier winners ==
- 1874 – Miss Hungerford
- 1875 – La Veine
- 1876 – Ventriloque
- 1877 – Congress
- 1878 – Wild Monarch
- 1879 – Wild Monarch
- 1880 – Recruit II
- 1881 – Maubourguet
- 1882 – Whisper Low
- 1883 – Too Good
- 1884 – Varaville
- 1885 – Redpath
- 1886 – Boissy
- 1887 – La Vigne
- 1888 – Parasang
- 1889 – Le Torpilleur
- 1890 – Royal Meath
- 1891 – Saida
- 1892 – Fleurissant
- 1893 – Skedaddle
- 1894 – Loutch
- 1895 – Styrax
- 1896 – Valois
- 1897 – Solitaire
- 1898 – Marise
- 1899 – Tancarville
- 1900 – Melibee
- 1901 – Calabrais
- 1902 – Gratin
- 1903 – Veinard
- 1904 – Dandolo
- 1905 – Canard
- 1906 – Burgrave II
- 1907 – Grosse Mere
- 1908 – Dandolo
- 1909 – Saint Caradec
- 1910 – Jerry M
- 1911 – Blagueur II
- 1912 – Hopper
- 1913 – Ultimatum
- 1914 – Lord Loris
- 1915–18 – no race
- 1919 – Troytown
- 1920 – Coq Gaulois
- 1921 – Roi Belge
- 1922 – Hertes XII
- 1923 – L'Yser
- 1924 – Master Bob
- 1925 – Silvo
- 1926 – Portmore
- 1927 – The Coyote
- 1928 – Maguelonne
- 1929 – Le Touquet
- 1930 – Le Fils de la Lune
- 1931 – La Fregate
- 1932 – Duc d'Anjou
- 1933 – Millionnaire II
- 1934 – Agitato
- 1935 – Fleuret
- 1936 – Potentate
- 1937 – Ingre
- 1938 – Heve
- 1939 – Ingre
- 1940 – no race
- 1941 – Kerfany
- 1942 – Symbole
- 1943 – Kargal
- 1944 – Hahnhof
- 1945 – Boum
- 1946 – Lindor
- 1947 – Lindor
- 1948 – Rideo

== See also ==
- List of French jump horse races
- Recurring events established in 1874 – this race is included under its original title, Grand National de France.
