= Arthur Veil-Picard =

Arthur Georges Veil-Picard (1854-1944), businessman and art collector, was a member of the Veil-Picard family, a French Jewish dynasty with roots going back before the French revolution.

Born in 1854 into the Veil-Picard French business and banking dynasty, Veil-Picard was the Director of Maison Pernod and an art collector.

== King of Absinthe ==
A major manufacturer of absinthe, the Veil-Picard family acquired the Pernod brand in 1888. Arthur's three sons took over after him in 1894.

== Art Collector ==
The Veil-Picard family had a long tradition of art collecting. In 1918, the famous French art dealer, René Gimpel, described Arthur Georges Veil-Picard as "the foremost art lover in Paris". He assembled his art collection at 63 rue de Courcelles over a period of forty years. The collection included eighteenth-century paintings, drawings and miniatures.

== Nazi occupation of France ==
Due to their Jewish heritage Veil-Picard and his family were persecuted and plundered during the Nazi occupation of France.

Many of the artworks seized were restituted to the family in 1946.

Three works from the former collection of Veil-Picard are currently in the National Gallery of Art:The Little Preacher, by Jean-Honoré Fragonard; Dr. Louis Martinet by Jean-Auguste-Dominique Ingres, and Cassabanca with Atlantes Supporting the Arms by a 16th century Italian artist.

== Family ==
His son also named Arthur Veil-Picard is famous in French horse racing circles.

== See also ==
- The Holocaust in France
- Einsatzstab Reichsleiter Rosenberg
- Paul Ricard
