= Mandarino =

Mandarino is a surname of Italian origin. Notable people with the surname include:

- Denis Mandarino (born 1964), Brazilian composer, artist and writer
- José Edison Mandarino (born 1941), Brazilian tennis player
- Mike Mandarino (1921–1985), American football player

Mandarino is also an hybrid (hi + ai ) based language learning platform.
