= Sean Mulryan =

Irish property developer

- Born: September 1954 (age 71–72)
- Occupation: Property developer
- Known for: Founder, chairman and CEO, Ballymore Group
- Spouse: Bernadine Mulryan
- Children: 5

Sean Mulryan (born September 1954) is an Irish property developer, and the founder and chairman and CEO of the Ballymore Group, a Dublin-based international property development company. He was named on the Estates Gazette 2017 'Power List', which lists the 50 most powerful individuals in Britain's commercial real estate sector. Mulryan was the only Irish person to be named on the list, which included US billionaire and Amazon founder Jeff Bezos and the chairman of CC Land, Cheung Chung-kiu.

In October 2018, he was named in the Evening Standard list of the 1,000 most influential Londoners while a month later in November 2018, Mulryan was recognised for “an outstanding contribution to Ireland and the Irish community in Great Britain” by The Ireland Funds Great Britain chapter.

== Early life ==
Sean Mulryan was born in September 1954, the son of John and Josephine Mulryan. He grew up in rural poverty in the village of Oran, near Castlerea, Co Roscommon, in the west of Ireland, in a farming family with seven children.

Mulryan left school at the age of 17, and trained as a bricklayer. Aged 19, he bought his first plot of land. At 26 he set up his own company and shortly afterwards founded Ballymore, which is now considered one of Europe's biggest property developers.

== Career ==
=== Ballymore Group ===
Ballymore Group was founded in 1982 by Mulryan, then aged 28, who is the chairman.

Ballymore has become one of the biggest providers of residential space in London. In 2017, it was reported that the previous year's profits at the UK arm of Ballymore had increased almost three-fold to £154.9m (€217.6m). In December 2016, Mulryan announced that the Ballymore Group had exited Nama. In addition, he said Ballymore had paid back “significant borrowings” to RBS, KBC and other institutions.

In 2019, published accounts for one of the group’s key UK-registered companies, Ballymore Properties Ltd, show it earned profits of £176.3 million in the 12 months ended 31 March 2018. Ballymore Properties Ltd had net assets of £54 million on 31 March 2018, compared to a £121 million deficit 12 months earlier.

Ballymore Group works on large-scale projects in London and across Europe, with a particular focus on urban regeneration. In 2016, it was reported that Oran native Sean Mulryan launched the latest development in Dublin, which is a €700 million development in the docklands. The 'Dublin Landings' waterfront regeneration project includes office, residential and retail/leisure accommodation. In 2020, Ballymore was approved to build a large mixed-use scheme on 2.8 hectares at Dublin’s Connolly Station in Dublin’s IFSC.

Several members of the Mulryan family have been involved in Ballymore. John Mulryan is a son of Sean Mulryan and is group managing director at Ballymore, meanwhile, Sean's brother Donal Mulryan used to work for Ballymore before starting his own development company, West Properties, which owns various developments in the UK, including Skyline Central, the tallest apartment complex in Manchester.

As of 2012, he is one of the richest men in Ireland. According to London's The Evening Standard, Mulryan owns more land in London than the Duke of Westminster.

On 16 February 2012, Wandsworth Council approved Ballymore Group's plans for the 15 acre development in Nine Elms. Embassy Gardens is set to provide "up to 1,982 new homes alongside shops, cafes, bars, restaurants, business space, a 100 bed hotel, a health centre, children's playgrounds and sports pitches". In 2014, it was reported that Mulryan had engaged Lazard and CBRE Group to raise about €2.5bn to fund the Embassy Gardens development.

At the time of its launch, former Mayor of London Boris Johnson described the Embassy Gardens project as “possibly the most important regeneration story in London and in the UK over the next 20 years”. In 2018, the Embassy of the United States, London, relocated from Grosvenor Square to Embassy Gardens. The land on which the new embassy stands was sold to the US government by the Ballymore Group after a deal was reached in 2008.

In March 2021, the Financial Times ran an investigation into Ballymore developments. Leaseholders at multiple Ballymore developments faced large increases in the service charge bills, with one stating a 58% increase in annual costs between 2015 and 2020; residents were reported to be left feeling trapped in increasingly unaffordable homes. Ballymore told the FT increases were due to inflation in services such as insurance and utilities, but residents said the charges also covered repairs to fix poor workmanship during the developments' construction.

=== Other work ===
Outside of his work with Ballymore, Mulryan was set to join the board of the Ireland West Airport Knock in 2017. Knock confirmed the appointment in May 2017, along with two other new directors. The airport is considered key for regional development and it expects to handle around 750,000 passengers in 2017, making it its busiest year. In 2022, Mulryan invested €5 million in Irish electric bike maker Modmo.

== Personal life ==
Mulryan and his wife Bernadine live at the Ardenode Stud, County Kildare, with five children. They are very active in horse racing and own "somewhere between 50 and 100" racehorses, trained in Ireland and France. Among his top horses was Forget the Past, which was a multiple winner at the highest level over jumps and trained by Michael O’Brien, who handled a number of Mulryan-owned horses. He also owned flat horses, including Thewayyouare, which was once considered to be a strong contender for The Derby. In 2017, Mulryan's Ballymore Properties sponsored the headline race on the last day of the Punchestown National Hunt Festival. Worth over €100,000, the Ballymore Handicap Hurdle is run over two and a half miles and is one of the most hotly contested races of the festival.

His friends include the athlete and politician Seb Coe and Bono, lead vocalist of Irish pop group U2. Debbie Harry, of the pop group Blondie sang at his 50th birthday party.
