= Bernard Secly =

Bernard Secly (born 5 May 1931 in Paris, France, died 12 September 2015 in Paris, France) was a horse trainer in Thoroughbred flat racing and most notably in steeplechase racing.

Secly won five Group One flat races but is best known for his conditioning two French Horse Racing Hall of Fame steeplechase horses, Katko and Al Capone II.
