= Auteuil Hippodrome =

Horse racing venue in Paris

Coordinates: 48°51′07.1″N 2°15′30.4″E

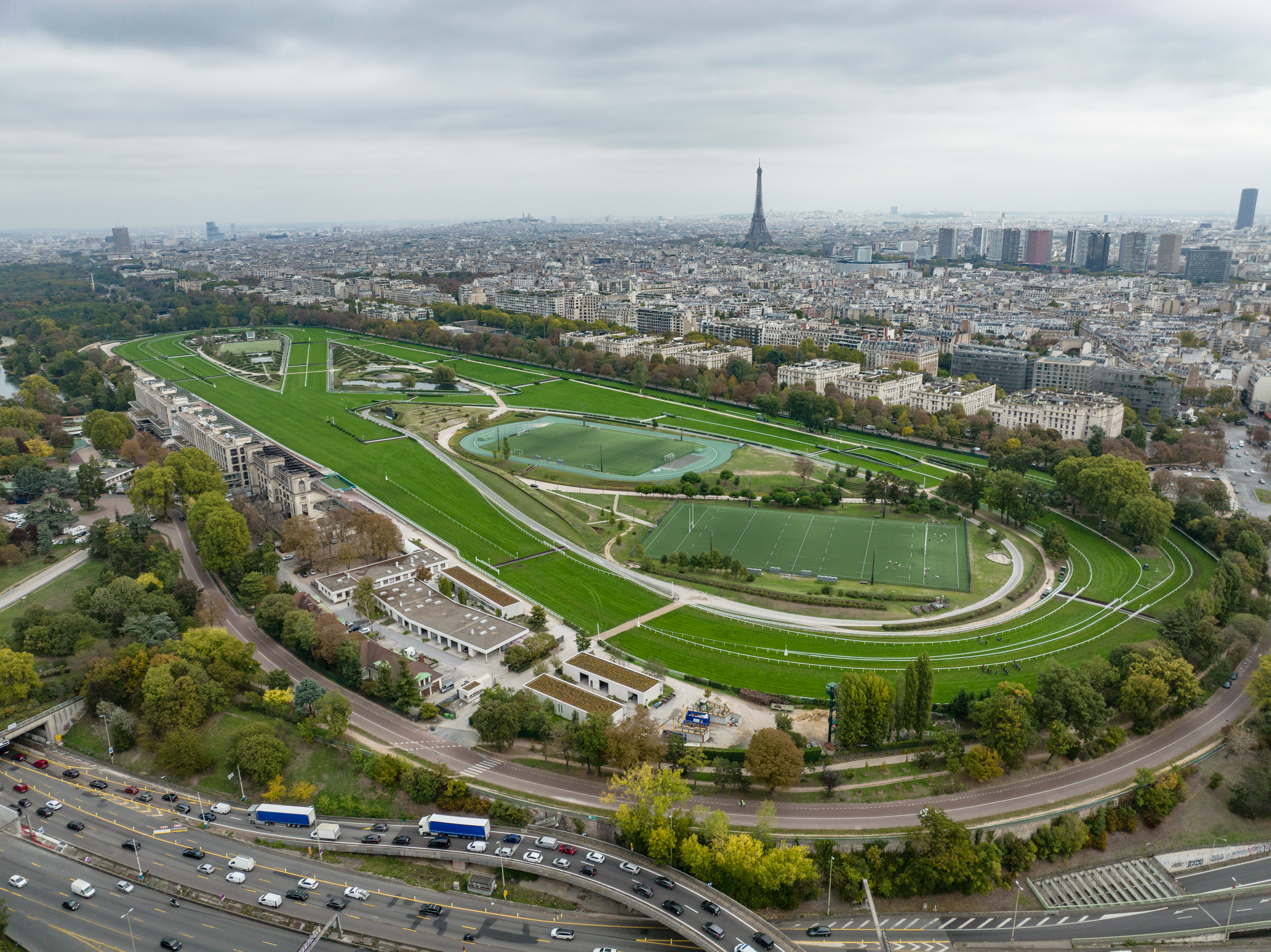
Auteuil Hippodrome in 2022

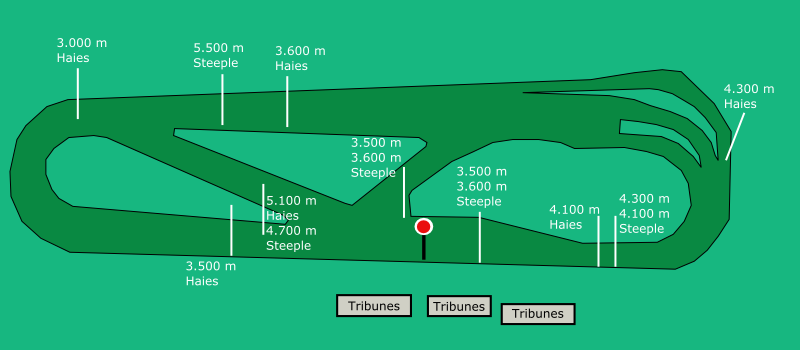
Auteuil Hippodrome

The Auteuil Hippodrome is a horse racing venue on Route des Lacs in the Bois de Boulogne, Paris, France. The 33-hectare (82-acre) race course opened November 1, 1873. It is designed exclusively for steeplechase racing.

Modernized a number of times, in 1971 access was improved when two pedestrian tunnels were built under the tracks that lead to the Porte d'Auteuil and the Porte de Passy.

It hosted the equestrian events of the 1924 Summer Olympics. It was operating during the liberation of Paris in 1944.

Operated by France Galop, important annual races held at the Auteuil Hippodrome include the Prix du Président de la République in April, the Grand Steeple-Chase de Paris in late May, the Grande Course de Haies usually run in June but being run in May in 2018 on the same card as the Grand Steeple-Chase, and the Prix La Haye Jousselin in early November.

Hippodrome d'Auteuil
