= Repeat winners of horse races =

A list of racehorses which have won the same race on three or more occasions.

== Thoroughbred flat races ==
Horse	Race	Wins	Years
Leaping Plum	Grasmick Handicap	8	1995, 1996, 1997, 1998, 1999, 2000, 2001, 2003
Balto	Coupe Clarke	7	1964, 1965, 1966, 1967, 1968, 1969, 1970
Doctor Syntax	Preston Gold Cup	7	1815, 1816, 1817, 1818, 1819, 1820, 1821
Ben's Cat	Mister Diz Stakes	6	2010, 2011, 2012, 2013, 2014, 2015
Beeswing	Newcastle Gold Cup	6	1836, 1837, 1838, 1839, 1841, 1842
Brown Jack	Queen Alexandra Stakes	6	1929, 1930, 1931, 1932, 1933, 1934
Gods Solution	Race Around Yorkshire Handicap (Note: Renamed the "Gods Solution Handicap" in 1990)	6	1985, 1986, 1987, 1988, 1989, 1991
Ben's Cat	Jim McKay Turf Sprint	5	2011, 2013, 2014, 2015, 2016
Doctor Syntax	Lancaster Gold Cup	5	1815, 1816, 1818, 1819, 1820
Doctor Syntax	Richmond Gold Cup	5	1818, 1820, 1821, 1822, 1823
Fine Art	Prix du Gros Chêne	5	1942, 1943, 1944, 1945, 1946
Further Flight	Jockey Club Cup	5	1991, 1992, 1993, 1994, 1995
Irish Linnet	Yaddo Handicap	5	1991, 1992, 1993, 1994, 1995
Ivor Hill	Bourail Cup	5	2012, 2014, 2015, 2016, 2017
Ivor Hill	Grand Prix De La Province Sud	5	2012, 2013, 2014, 2015, 2017
Kelso	Jockey Club Gold Cup	5	1960, 1961, 1962, 1963, 1964
Manikato	William Reid Stakes	5	1979, 1980, 1981, 1982, 1983
Bank of Burden	Stockholm Cup International	4	2011, 2012, 2014, 2015 (Note: Ran 2nd in 2013)
Battaash	King George Stakes	4	2017, 2018, 2019, 2020
Battle Eve	Auckland RC King's Plate	4	1975 (Jan), 1976 (Jan), 1976 (Dec), 1977 (Dec)
Beeswing	Doncaster Cup	4	1837, 1840, 1841, 1842
Boldboy	Abernant Stakes	4	1974, 1976, 1977, 1978
Conard Lord	Autumn Marathon	4	2016, 2017, 2019, 2020
Cricket Ball	Prix de Meautry	4	1986, 1987, 1988, 1989
Danzapride	Canterbury JC Enterprise Homes Handicap	4	2001, 2002, 2003, 2004
Dr Blarney	Rise Jim Stakes	4	2017, 2018, 2019, 2020
Exterminator	Saratoga Cup	4	1919, 1920, 1921, 1922
Forego	Woodward Stakes	4	1974, 1975, 1976, 1977
Gloaming	Wanganui JC Jackson Stakes	4	1919, 1921, 1922, 1924
Goldikova	Prix Rothschild	4	2008, 2009, 2010, 2011
Gold Phoenix	Del Mar Handicap	4	2022, 2023, 2024, 2025
He'spuregold	Irish War Cry Handicap	4	2021,2022,2023,2024
Ivor Hill	Classique Jean-Yves Lacrose	4	2012, 2013, 2014, 2015
Karun	Clásico Nuestra Señora de la Chiquinquirá	4	2011, 2012, 2013, 2014
Last Impact	Clásico Verano-Arturo Cousiño L.	4	2007, 2008, 2009, 2010
L'Estran	Gran Premio Merano	4	2019, 2020, 2021, 2022
Lord	Memsie Stakes	4	1958, 1959, 1960, 1961
Manikato	Futurity Stakes (Australia)	4	1979, 1980, 1981, 1983
Marsyas	Prix du Cadran	4	1944, 1945, 1946, 1947
Menudo	Super Stakes	4	1999, 2000, 2001, 2002
Old Boy	Gran Premio de Honor (Chile)	4	1914, 1915, 1916, 1917
Old Boy	Gran Premio Internacional de Chile	4	1914, 1915, 1916, 1917
Omega Perfume	Tokyo Daishoten	4	2018, 2019, 2020, 2021
Papelon	Clásico Club Hípico de Santiago Falabella	4	2010, 2012, 2013, 2014
Pink Lloyd	Jacques Cartier Stakes	4	2017, 2018, 2019, 2020
Pink Lloyd	Vigil Stakes	4	2017, 2018, 2019, 2020
Pocket Power	L'Ormarins Queen's Plate	4	2007, 2008, 2009, 2010
Pure Sensation	Turf Monster Stakes	4	2015, 2017, 2018, 2019
Rainha Pioneira	Clásico Asociación de Criadores de SPC	4	2019, 2020, 2021, 2022
Rainha Pioneira	Clásico Rufino T. Dominguez	4	2019, 2020, 2021, 2022
River Verdon	Hong Kong Champions & Chater Cup	4	1991, 1992, 1993, 1994
Rocket Man	Lion City Cup	4	2009, 2010, 2011, 2012
Romantic Warrior	Hong Kong Cup	4	2022, 2023, 2024, 2025
Romantic Warrior	Queen Elizabeth II Cup	4	2022, 2023, 2024, 2026
Royal Snack	Moe Cup	4	1993, 1994, 1995, 1996
Sharp Matt	Zawawi Cup	4	1995, 1996, 1997, 1998
Shotgun Kowboy	Oklahoma Classics Cup Stakes	4	2015, 2017, 2018, 2019
Sleepy Fox	Easter Handicap	4	1944, 1945, 1946, 1947
Star Guitar	Premier Night Championship Stakes	4	2009, 2010, 2011, 2012
Stradivarius	Goodwood Cup	4	2017, 2018, 2019, 2020
Tie the Knot	Chipping Norton Stakes	4	1999, 2000, 2001, 2002
Trafalgar	AJC Randwick Plate	4	1909, 1910, 1911, 1912
Triple Nine	President's Cup	4	2015, 2016, 2017, 2018
Tulloch	Avondale Gold Cup	4	1891, 1891, 1892, 1893
Vinnie Roe	Irish St. Leger	4	2001, 2002, 2003, 2004
Whitmore	Hot Springs Stakes	4	2017, 2018, 2019, 2020
Winx	Cox Plate	4	2015, 2016, 2017, 2018
Winx	Chipping Norton Stakes	4	2016, 2017, 2018, 2019
Winx	George Ryder Stakes	4	2016, 2017, 2018, 2019
Yeats	Ascot Gold Cup	4	2006, 2007, 2008, 2009
Zipping	Sandown Classic	4	2007, 2008, 2009, 2010
Abdel Nazer	Clásico Enrique Martinelli Tizo	3	2018, 2019, 2020
Achilles	Wanganui JC Jackson Stakes	3	1904, 1905, 1906
Acclamation	Charles Whittingham Handicap	3	2010, 2011, 2012
Adil	Grande Prêmio São Paulo	3	1955, 1956, 1957
Admire Don	JBC Classic	3	2002, 2003, 2004
Ajax II	All Aged Stakes	3	1938, 1939, 1940
Ajax II	Futurity Stakes (Australia)	3	1938, 1939, 1940
Ajax II	Memsie Stakes	3	1938, 1939, 1940
Ajax II	Underwood Stakes	3	1938, 1939, 1940
Albert	Stayers Stakes	3	2015, 2016, 2017
Aldous Snow	Singspiel Stakes	3	2014, 2015, 2017
Altano	Oleander-Rennen	3	2012, 2013, 2014
Altgold	Goldene Peitsche	3	1899, 1900, 1901
Anilin	Preis von Europa	3	1965, 1966, 1967
Annus Mirabilis	Winter Hill Stakes	3	1996, 1997, 1998
Arch Hall	Sir Barton Stakes	3	2004, 2005, 2006
Azeri	Apple Blossom Handicap	3	2002, 2003, 2004
Barbelle	Flying Stakes	3	1870, 1871, 1872
Bardall	Foxbridge Plate	3	1969, 1971, 1972
Bardall	Paeroa (NZ) Queen Elizabeth II Plate	3	1969, 1971, 1972
Basqueian	Durham Cup Handicap	3	1994, 1995, 1996
Beholder	Zenyatta Stakes	3	2013, 2014, 2015
Benbaun	Flying Five Stakes	3	2005, 2006, 2007
Ben's Cat	Maryland Million Turf Sprint Handicap	3	2010, 2011, 2012
Ben's Cat	Parx Dash Handicap	3	2012, 2013, 2014
Ben's Cat	Fabulous Strike Handicap	3	2012, 2013, 2014
Bigaroon	Irish Cesarewitch	3	1970, 1971, 1973
Black Caviar	Lightning Stakes	3	2011, 2012, 2013
Blazer	Wellington RC Telegraph Handicap	3	1900, 1901, 1902
Blue Blood	Wellington RC Telegraph Handicap	3	1975, 1976, 1977
Blue Concorde	Mile Championship Nambu Hai	3	2006, 2007, 2008
Blyton Lad	Rous Stakes	3	1990, 1991, 1992
Boobe Grand	Zawawi Cup	3	1978, 1980, 1981
Brass in Pocket	Classy 'N Smart Stakes	3	2002, 2003, 2004
Burden of Proof	Amethyst Stakes	3	1997, 1998, 1999
California Flag	Morvich Stakes	3	2008, 2009, 2011
Candid Glen	John B. Connally Turf Cup	3	2001, 2002, 2003
Carbine	AJC Plate	3	1889, 1890, 1891
Castletown	Wellington Cup	3	1991, 1992, 1994
Chatham	Craven Plate	3	1931, 1933, 1934
Chatham	Linlithgow Stakes	3	1931, 1932, 1933
Chautauqua	TJ Smith Stakes	3	2015, 2016, 2017
Chief Cicatriz	Phoenix Gold Cup	3	2017,2018,2021
Cirrus des Aigles	Prix Dollar	3	2010, 2012, 2013
Cirrus des Aigles	Prix Ganay	3	2012, 2014, 2015
Colindres	Gran Premio de Madrid	3	1927, 1928, 1929
Commissionaire	New Zealand International Stakes	3	1972, 1973, 1974
Conard Lord	Prize of the Ministry of Agriculture of the Russian Federation Stakes	3	2017, 2018, 2019
Copano Rickey	Kashiwa Kinen	3	2014, 2016, 2017
Constans	Prix de Saint-Georges	3	1972, 1973, 1974
Coyote Lakes	Gallant Fox Handicap	3	2001, 2001, 2002
Cynisca	Wellington Cup	3	1890, 1891, 1892
David	AJC Plate	3	1921, 1922, 1923
Dazzle	Ayr Gold Cup	3	1889, 1890, 1891
Del Mar Dennis	San Bernardino Handicap	3	1994, 1995, 1996
Delta	Chelmsford Stakes	3	1950, 1951, 1952
Desert Gold	Wellington RC Champion Plate	3	1915, 1916, 1917
Desert Gold	Islington Plate	3	1915, 1916, 1917
Desert Gold	Awapuni Gold Cup	3	1916, 1917, 1918
Devil Diver	Metropolitan Handicap	3	1943, 1944, 1945
Diamante Negro	Handicap de las Américas	3	2014, 2015, 2016
Dijital	Premio General Pueyrredón	3	1915, 1916, 1917
Discovery	Brooklyn Handicap	3	1934, 1935, 1936
Discovery	Whitney Handicap	3	1934, 1935, 1936
Donjuan	Clásico América	3	2017, 2018, 2019
Double Trigger	Doncaster Cup	3	1995, 1996, 1998
Double Trigger	Goodwood Cup	3	1995, 1997, 1998
El Asteroide	Grande Prêmio Bento Gonçalves	3	1964, 1965, 1966
El Pais	Gran Premio de Madrid	3	1980, 1981, 1982
El Rastro	Prix de Ris-Orangis	3	1974, 1975, 1976
Enable	King George VI and Queen Elizabeth Stakes	3	2017, 2019, 2020
Erimo Harrier	Hakodate Kinen	3	2005, 2006, 2007
Eurythmic	Caulfield Stakes	3	1920, 1921, 1922
Eurythmic	Memsie Stakes	3	1920, 1921, 1922
Exterminator	Pimlico Cup	3	1919, 1920, 1921
Exterminator	Toronto Autumn Cup	3	1920, 1921, 1922
Famous Name	Amethyst Stakes	3	2010, 2011, 2012
Famous Name	International Stakes (Ireland)	3	2009, 2011, 2012
Famous Name	Meld Stakes	3	2010, 2011, 2012
Fine Art	Prix du Petit Couvert	3	1944, 1945, 1946
Fine Art	Prix de Seine-et-Oise	3	1942, 1944, 1945
Firenze	Freehold Stakes	3	1888, 1889, 1890
Flawlessly	Matriarch Handicap	3	1991, 1992, 1993
Flawlessly	Ramona Handicap	3	1992, 1993, 1994
Flying Halo	William Reid Stakes	3	1952, 1953, 1955
Forego	Brooklyn Handicap	3	1974, 1975, 1976
Game	Ormond Memorial Gold Cup	3	1969, 1970, 1971
Game On Dude	Santa Anita Handicap	3	2011, 2013, 2014
Girona Fever	Gran Premio Maroñas	3	2022, 2023, 2024
Girona Fever	Clásico Plinio Oribe Y Andrés Oribe Deus	3	2021, 2022, 2023
Gloaming	Craven Plate	3	1919, 1922, 1924
Gloaming	Islington Plate	3	1918, 1919, 1920
Gloaming	Wellington RC Champion Plate	3	1918, 1919, 1922
Gloaming	North Island Challenge Stakes	3	1922, 1924, 1925
Gold Ship	Hanshin Daishōten	3	2013, 2014, 2015
Golden Sixty	Jockey Club Mile	3	2020, 2021, 2022
Golden Sixty	Champions Mile	3	2021, 2022, 2023
Goldikova	Breeders' Cup Mile	3	2008, 2009, 2010
Good Ba Ba	Hong Kong Mile	3	2007, 2008, 2009
Gran Ducato	Gran Premio Hipódromo Chile	3	1995, 1996, 1997
Great Sensation	Wellington Cup	3	1961, 1962, 1963
Grey Way	Canterbury JC Gordon's Gin Handicap (Note: race named McWilliams Wines Handicap in 1976)	3	1974, 1975, 1976
Grey Way	Wellington RC Metropolitan Handicap (Note: 2nd 1977 - race named Visitors' Handicap from 1977 on)	3	1974, 1978, 1979
Grey Way	White Robe Lodge Handicap	3	1976, 1977, 1979
Grey Way	Black and White Whisky Sprint	3	1977, 1979, 1980
Halmahera	Portland Handicap	3	2002, 2003, 2004
High Line	Jockey Club Cup	3	1969, 1970, 1971
Hiper Genio	Grande Prêmio Bento Gonçalves	3	1985, 1986, 1988
Hokko Tarumae	Kawasaki Kinen	3	2014, 2015, 2016
Holdfast	Canterbury Stakes	3	1930, 1931, 1932
Ice Water	Belle Mahone Stakes	3	1966, 1967, 1968
Inchrory	Oslo Cup	3	1997, 1998, 1999
Intransigent	Kiwifruit Cup	3	2013, 2014, 2015
Irish Rover	Opunake Cup	3	2002, 2003, 2004
Ivor Hill	Coupe Clarke	3	2013, 2014, 2015
John Henry	Hollywood Invitational Handicap	3	1980, 1981, 1984
John Henry	Oak Tree Invitational	3	1980, 1981, 1982
Joshua Tree	Canadian International Stakes	3	2010, 2012, 2013
Kelso	Whitney Handicap	3	1961, 1963, 1965
Kelso	Woodward Stakes	3	1961, 1962, 1963
Kincsem	Grosser Preis von Baden	3	1877, 1878, 1879
Kincsem	Kaiserpreis/Staatspreis I. Classe	3	1877, 1878, 1879
Kincsem	Kanczadij	3	1877, 1878, 1879
Kindergarten	North Island Challenge Stakes	3	1941, 1942, 1943
Kindergarten	Harcourt Stakes	3	1942, 1943, 1944
Kingston Town	Cox Plate	3	1980, 1981, 1982
Kingston Town	Warwick Stakes	3	1980, 1981, 1982
Ladies Are Forever	Summer Stakes	3	2011, 2013, 2014
L'Atlantide	Grande Prêmio Cordeiro da Graça	3	1939, 1940, 1941
Lava Man	Hollywood Gold Cup	3	2005, 2006, 2007
Legal Eagle	L'Ormarins Queen's Plate	3	2016, 2017, 2018
Legal Eagle	Horse Chestnut Stakes	3	2016, 2016, 2018
Limerick	Chelmsford Stakes	3	1926, 1927, 1928
Lombard	Grosser Preis von Düsseldorf	3	1971, 1972, 1973
Lord North	Dubai Turf	3	2021, 2022 2023
Lord Reims	Adelaide Cup	3	1987, 1988, 1989
Lough Neagh	Chipping Norton Stakes	3	1933, 1936, 1937
Lough Neagh	Rawson Stakes	3	1933, 1936, 1937
Lucky Strike	Bénazet-Rennen	3	2004, 2005, 2007
Makybe Diva	Melbourne Cup	3	2003, 2004, 2005
Manikato	C. F. Orr Stakes	3	1979, 1980, 1981
Maraahel	Huxley Stakes	3	2005, 2006, 2007
Marchand d'Or	Prix Maurice de Gheest	3	2006, 2007, 2008
Matsurida Gogh	Sankei Sho All-Comers	3	2006, 2007, 2008
Melody Belle	Windsor Park Plate	3	2018, 2019, 2020
Mentirosa	Premio Colombia	3	1907, 1908, 1909
Mercurius	G. P. von Nordrhein-Westfalen	3	1963, 1964, 1965
Midday	Nassau Stakes	3	2009, 2010, 2011
Mine	Bunbury Cup	3	2002, 2005, 2006
Miss Woodford	Ocean Stakes	3	1884, 1885, 1886
Moonlight Cloud	Prix Maurice de Gheest	3	2011, 2012, 2013
Mouchette	Gran Premio de Honor	3	1911, 1912, 1913
Mr. Buff	Jazil Stakes	3	2019, 2020, 2021
Mr Tiz	Railway Handicap	3	1989, (Note: Dead-heated for first) 1990, 1991
Mubtaker	Geoffrey Freer Stakes	3	2002, 2003, 2004
Musketier	Singspiel Stakes	3	2009, 2011, 2012
Native Diver	Hollywood Gold Cup	3	1965, 1966, 1967
Native Diver	Inglewood Handicap	3	1963, 1964, 1966
Native Diver	San Diego Handicap	3	1963, 1964, 1965
Nautilus	Prix du Cadran	3	1839, 1840, 1842
Nelson	Auckland Cup	3	1885, 1886, 1888
New Dandy	Gran Premio 9 de Julio	3	1982, 1983, 1984
Nicke	Stockholm Cup International	3	1978, 1980, 1984
Noel	St. Leger Italiano	3	1999, 2000, 2001
Nouvel An	Gran Premio de Madrid	3	1919, 1920, 1921
Oberwinter	Goldene Peitsche	3	1927, 1928, 1929
Ohio	Cotton Fitzsimmons Mile Handicap	3	2019, 2020, 2021
Oleander	Grosser Preis von Baden	3	1927, 1928, 1929
One for Rose	Algoma Stakes	3	2003, 2004, 2005
One Master	Prix de la Forêt	3	2018, 2019, 2020
Or Jack	Gran Premio Merano	3	1994, 1995, 1996
Ordak Dan	Gran Premio 25 de Mayo	3	2013, 2015, 2017
Order of St George	Irish St Leger Trial Stakes	3	2015, 2016, 2017
Osumi Diner	Misuho Sho	3	1997, 1998, 1999
Overdrawn	Jamaica Handicap	3	1941, 1942, 1943
Paraje	Display Handicap	3	1971, 1972, 1973
Pensacola	Prix du Gros Chêne	3	1875, 1876, 1877
Peppercorn	Grosser Preis von Düsseldorf	3	2000, 2001, 2004
Peppers Pride	New Mexico Cup Fillies and Mares	3	2006, 2007, 2008
Persian Punch	Henry II Stakes	3	1997, 1998, 2000
Persian Punch	Jockey Club Cup	3	2000, 2002, 2003
Phar Lap	Craven Plate	3	1929, 1930, 1931
Picaroon	Ormond Memorial Gold Cup	3	1960, 1961, 1963
Piet	Jamaica Handicap	3	1949, 1950, 1951
Pillito	Premio Hipódromo Argentino	3	1898, 1899, 1900
Pink Lloyd	Shepperton Stakes	3	2017, 2019, 2020
Pipoldchap	Zawawi Cup	3	2004, 2005, 2006
Pocket Power	J & B Metropolitan Stakes	3	2007, 2008, 2009
Power Flame	Ostermann-Pokal	3	1997, 1998, 2000
Pressing	Topkapi Trophy	3	2008, 2009, 2010
Prince Charlie	All-Aged Stakes	3	1872, 1873, 1874
Prospective Dolly	Seaway Stakes	3	1991, 1992, 1994
Prospective Dolly	Whimsical Stakes	3	1991, 1993, 1994
Quicken Away	Chairman's Prize	3	1989, 1990, 1991
Rahy's Attorney	Bunty Lawless Stakes	3	2007, 2009, 2010
Red Gauntlet	CJC Jockey Club Handicap^{[f]}	3	1903, 1904, 1906
Redelva	SAJC Spring Stakes	3	1988, 1989, 1990
Repertory	Prix du Petit Couvert	3	2000, 2001, 2003
Reynaldothewizard	Dubawi Stakes	3	2015, 2016, 2017
Robin's Reward	Manawatu Cup	3	1948, 1949, 1950
Roller	Royal Whip Stakes	3	1822, 1824, 1825
Roman Consul	Chelmsford Stakes	3	1967, 1968, 1969
Rough Habit	Doomben Cup	3	1991, 1992, 1993
Safely Kept	Genuine Risk Stakes	3	1989, 1990, 1991
Sagaro	Ascot Gold Cup	3	1975, 1976, 1977
Sahpresa	Sun Chariot Stakes	3	2009, 2010, 2011
Salselon	Premio Chiusura	3	2001, 2002, 2003
Satanico	Clásico Santiago García M.	3	1993, 1994, 1995
Sekai O	Naruo Kinen	3	1956, 1957, 1958
Shady Well	Durham Cup Handicap	3	1932, 1933, 1934
Shamal	Kurofune Sho	3	2023, 2024, 2025
Sharpo	Nunthorpe Stakes	3	1980, 1981, 1982
Silverfoot	Louisville Handicap	3	2004, 2005, 2006
Silver Living	Hong Kong Champions & Chater Cup	3	1978, 1979, 1981
Sir Bear	Skip Away Handicap	3	1998, 1999, 2002
Sir Slick	Awapuni Gold Cup	3	2007, 2008, 2010
Skylark	Royal Whip Stakes	3	1830, 1831, 1832
St. Gatien	Jockey Club Cup	3	1884, 1885, 1886
St Paul	Avondale Gold Cup	3	1896, 1897, 1898
Stallwalkin' Dude	Tale of the Cat Stakes	3	2015, 2016, 2017
Storm Rodrigo	Clásico Independencia	3	2018, 2019, 2020
Stradivarius	Ascot Gold Cup	3	2018, 2019, 2020
Sundridge	July Cup	3	1902, 1903, 1904
Super Elegant	Rubiton Stakes	3	2003, 2004, 2005
Super Moment	Bay Meadows Handicap	3	1980, 1981, 1982
Super Scot	Zawawi Cup	3	1972, 1974, 1975
Super Win	Hong Kong Champions & Chater Cup	3	1975, 1976, 1977
Sun Beau	Hawthorn Gold Cup	3	1929, 1930, 1931
Sunbean	Gold Cup Stakes	3	2013, 2014, 2016
Syphon	Prix de Meautry	3	1906, 1907, 1909
Tag End	Nunthorpe Stakes	3	1928, 1929, 1930
Take Wing	Meadowland Handicap	3	1944, 1945, 1947
Tap Dance City	Kinko Sho	3	2003, 2004, 2005
The Diamond One	White Robe Lodge Handicap	3	2014, 2015, 2016
The Viceroy	Super Stakes	3	1989, 1990, 1992
Ticino	Grosser Preis von Reichshauptstadt	3	1942, 1943, 1944
Tiépolo	Clásico General Alvear	3	1921, 1922, 1924
Tokio	Jubiläums Preis	3	1895, 1896, 1897
Track Gal	Rancho Bernardo Handicap	3	1995, 1996, 1997
Trifle	Clásico General Alvear	3	1912, 1913, 1914
Tristan	Champion Stakes	3	1882, 1883, 1884
Tristan	Grand Prix de Deauville	3	1882, 1883, 1884
Tristan	Hardwicke Stakes	3	1882, 1883, 1884
Trueshan	British Champions Long Distance Cup	3	2020, 2021, 2022
Tulloch	AJC Queen Elizabeth Stakes	3	1958, 1960, 1961
Tumbleweed Ridge	Ballycorus Stakes	3	1998, 1999, 2000
Vermilion	JBC Classic	3	2007, 2008, 2009
Viva Pataca	Hong Kong Champions & Chater Cup	3	2006, 2007, 2009
Vo Rogue	C F Orr Stakes	3	1988, 1989, 1990
Voila Ici	Premio Federico Tesio	3	2008, 2009, 2010
Voltaic	Wanganui JC Jackson Stakes	3	1948, 1949, 1950
Waiuku	Wellington RC Thompson Handicap (no race 1896)	3	1895, 1897, 1898
Wakeful	Melbourne Stakes	3	1901, 1902, 1903
Wally	Gran Premio Estrellas Sprint	3	1995, 1996, 1997
Waquaas	Täby Vårsprint	3	2001, 2004, 2006
War Like Goddess	Bewitch Stakes	3	2021, 2022, 2023
Warningford	Leicestershire Stakes	3	1999, 2001, 2002
Whitmore	Count Fleet Sprint Handicap	3	2017, 2018, 2020
Win Here	Clásico Julio Prado Amor	3	2020, 2021, 2022
Winfreux	Caulfield Stakes	3	1965, 1966, 1967
Winx	Apollo Stakes	3	2016, 2018, 2019
Winx	Warwick/Winx Stakes	3	2016, 2017, 2018
Winx	George Main Stakes	3	2016, 2017, 2018
Winx	Queen Elizabeth Stakes (ATC)	3	2017, 2018, 2019
Woodpecker	Craven Stakes	3	1778, 1779, 1781
Zenyatta	Clement L. Hirsch Stakes / Handicap	3	2008, 2009, 2010
Zenyatta	Lady's Secret Stakes (now known as the Zenyatta Stakes)	3	2008, 2009, 2010
Zenyatta	Vanity Handicap	3	2008, 2009, 2010
Zirbo	Grande Prêmio Bento Gonçalves	3	1981, 1982, 1983

== National Hunt races ==
Horse	Race	Wins	Years
Al Capone II	Prix La Haye Jousselin	7	1993, 1994, 1995, 1996, 1997, 1998, 1999
Franc Picard	Grand Steeple-Chase de Dieppe	7	1853, 1854, 1855, 1856, 1857, 1859, 1861
Koral	Homeby Steeplechase (Note: second in 1967)	7	1965, 1966, 1968, 1969, 1970, 1971, 1972
Redpath	Grand Steeple-Chase des Flandres	7 (Note: possibly eight wins)	1880s–90s
Risk of Thunder	La Touche Cup (Note: Not held in 2001 owing to a foot-and-mouth outbreak)	7	1995, 1996, 1997, 1998, 1999, 2000, 2002
Oju Chosan	Nakayama Grand Jump	6	2016, 2017, 2018, 2019, 2020, 2022
Quevega	David Nicholson Mares' Hurdle	6	2009, 2010, 2011, 2012, 2013, 2014
Elkridge	Indian River Handicap	5	1942, 1945, 1948, 1949, 1950
Golden Miller	Cheltenham Gold Cup	5	1932, 1933, 1934, 1935, 1936
Hurricane Fly	Irish Champion Hurdle	5	2011, 2012, 2013, 2014, 2015
Kauto Star	King George VI Chase	5	2006, 2007, 2008, 2009, 2011
Manhattan Boy	Peacehaven Selling Handicap Hurdle	5	1986, 1987, 1989, 1992, 1993
McDynamo	Grand National Hurdle Stakes (Note: Run as the Breeders' Cup Steeplechase Stakes 2003-2005 and as the Breeders' Cup Grand National Hurdle Stakes in 2006)	5	2003, 2004, 2005, 2006, 2007
On The Fringe	Champion Hunters Steeplechase	5	2010, 2012, 2014, 2015, 2016
Rézkakas	Damenpreis Steeplechase	5	1901, 1902, 1903, 1904, 1905
Victoria	Grosse Frankfurter Steeple-chase	5	1879, 1880, 1881, 1882, 1883
Cheekio Ora	Herefordshire Light Horse Breeding Society's Hunter Chase	5	1980s
Credit Call	Adam Scott Memorial Cup	5	1970s
Baracouda	Long Walk Hurdle	4	2000, 2001, 2003, 2004
Bashboy	Crisp Steeplechase	4	2012, 2013, 2014, 2015 (Note: This race is held at Sandown Racecourse, Melbourne, Australia, but in 2015 was run at Warrnambool due to track renovations being undertaken at Sandown.)
Baulking Green	United Hunts' Chase	4	1963, 1964, 1965, 1967
Big Buck's	Liverpool Hurdle	4	2009, 2010, 2011, 2012
Big Buck's	Long Distance Hurdle	4	2009, 2010, 2011, 2012
Big Buck's	World Hurdle	4	2009, 2010, 2011, 2012
Credit Call	Horse and Hound Cup	4	1971, 1972, 1973, 1975
Desert Orchid	King George VI Chase	4	1986, 1988, 1989, 1990
Doiran	Great Eastern Steeplechase	4	1918, 1919, 1922, 1923
Dorans Pride	Morris Oil Chase	4	1997, 1998, 1999, 2000
Edredon Bleu	Peterborough Chase	4	1998, 1999, 2000, 2001
Elkridge	North American Steeplechase	4	1942, 1943, 1946, 1948
Flatterer	Colonial Cup	4	1983, 1984, 1985, 1986
Florida Pearl	Hennessy Gold Cup (Ireland)	4	1999, 2000, 2001, 2004
Hurricane Fly	December Festival Hurdle	4	2010, 2012, 2013, 2014
Indikator	Rotorua Cup (Note: second in 2012)	4	2010, 2011, 2013, 2014
Istabraq	Irish Champion Hurdle	4	1998, 1999, 2000, 2001
Istabraq	December Festival Hurdle	4	1997, 1998, 1999, 2001
Kauto Star	Betfair Chase	4	2006, 2007, 2009, 2011
Koei Try	Hanshin Jump Stakes	4	2006, 2007, 2008, 2010
Koral	CJC Lincoln Steeplechase (Note: Koral also ran second in 1966, 1967 and 1972 (his last race start, as a 12-year-old), He did not run in 1970. The race was renamed the Koral Steeplechase in 1973.)	4	1965, 1968, 1969, 1971
Morley Street	Aintree Hurdle	4	1990, 1991, 1992, 1993
Quevega	World Series Hurdle	4	2010, 2011, 2012, 2013
Sharjah	December Festival Hurdle	4	2018, 2019, 2020, 2021
Silver Buck	Edward Hanmer Chase	4	1979, 1980, 1981, 1982
Sizing Europe	Gowran Park Champion Chase	4	2011, 2012, 2013, 2014
Spot Thedifference	November Cross Country Chase	4	2004, 2005, 2006, 2007
Taupin Rochelais	Grand Steeple-Chase des Flandres	4	2015, 2016, 2017, 2018
The New One	Champion Hurdle Trial	4	2015, 2016, 2017, 2018
Zama Lad	Yalumba Classic Hurdle	4	1982, 1983, 1984, 1985
Železník	Velká Pardubická	4	1987, 1988, 1989, 1991
Flying Ace	Adam Scott Memorial Cup	4	
Tuscalee	National Hunt Cup	4	1966, 1969, 1972, one other time
Agent (a.k.a. The Agent)	Grand National Steeplechase (New Zealand)	3	1879, 1880, 1884
Al Capone II	Prix Georges Courtois	3	1993, 1994,1996
Al Eile	Aintree Hurdle	3	2005, 2007, 2008
Always Waining	Topham Chase	3	2010, 2011, 2012
Apple's Jade	Hatton's Grace Hurdle	3	2016, 2017, 2018
Apple's Jade	Christmas Hurdle	3	2017, 2018, 2019
Arkle	Cheltenham Gold Cup	3	1964, 1965, 1966
Awaywiththegreys	British Horse Racing Handicap Hurdle	3	2013, 2014, 2015
Badsworth Boy	Queen Mother Champion Chase	3	1983, 1984, 1985
Bashboy	Grand National Steeplechase (Australia)	3	2012, 2013, 2015
Baulking Green	Horse and Hound Cup	3	1962, 1963, 1965
Beef Or Salmon	Hennessy Gold Cup (Ireland)	3	2003, 2006, 2007
Beef Or Salmon	Lexus Chase	3	2002, 2004, 2005
Best Mate	Cheltenham Gold Cup	3	2002, 2003, 2004
Big Buck's	Long Walk Hurdle	3	2009, 2010, 2011
Big Zeb	Fortria Chase	3	2009, 2010, 2011
Big Zeb	Paddy Power Dial-A-Bet Chase	3	2008, 2010, 2011
Bird's Nest	Bula Hurdle	3	1977, 1978, 1980
Bird's Nest	Fighting Fifth Hurdle	3	1976, 1977, 1979
Brigand	Velká Pardubická	3	1875, 1877, 1878
Brown Lad	Irish Grand National	3	1975, 1976, 1978
Burrough Hill Lad	Gainsborough Chase	3	1984, 1985, (Note: By walkover) 1986
Charles Dickens	Grand Military Gold Cup	3	1970, 1971, 1972
Chocolate Royal	Von Doussa Steeplechase	3	1978, 1979, 1980
Clarion Call	Wanganui Steeplechase	3	1937, 1938, 1940
Cloughtaney	Lismullen Amateur Hurdle	3	1988, 1989, 1990
Cogitation	Homeby Steeplechase	3	1956, 1957, 1958
Comedy of Errors	Fighting Fifth Hurdle	3	1972, 1973, 1974
Cottage Rake	Cheltenham Gold Cup	3	1948, 1949, 1950
Couvrefeu II	Scottish Grand National	3	1911, 1912, 1913
Credit Call	Fox Hunters' Chase	3	1972, 1975, 1976
De Pluvinel	Royal Artillery Gold Cup	3	1983, 1989, 1990
Deecee Seven	Koral Steeplechase	3	1996, 1997, 1998
Derrymoyle	Tipperkevin Hurdle	3	1995, 1996, 1998
Desert Orchid	Gainsborough Chase	3	1987, 1989, 1991
Epigraf	Velká Pardubická	3	1957, 1958, 1959
Fairmount	Temple Gwathmey Steeplechase	3	1926, 1927, 1928
Flagship Uberalles	Tingle Creek Chase	3	1999, 2000, 2001
Golden Silver	Hilly Way Chase	3	2009, 2010, 2011
Grabel	December Festival Hurdle	3	1988, 1989, 1990
Hatton's Grace	Champion Hurdle	3	1949, 1950, 1951
Hunterville	Great Northern Steeplechase	3	1983, 1984, 1985
Hurricane Fly	Punchestown Champion Hurdle	3	2010, 2011, 2012
Hurricane Fly	Morgiana Hurdle	3	2012, 2013, 2014
Hyeres III	Grand Steeple-Chase de Paris	3	1964, 1965, 1966
Hypnotize	Pakuranga Hunt Cup	3	2007, 2008, 2010
Hypnotize	Great Northern Steeplechase	3	2007, 2008, 2010
Inglis Drever	Long Distance Hurdle	3	2005, 2006, 2007
Inglis Drever	World Hurdle	3	2005, 2007, 2008
Istabraq	Champion Hurdle	3	1998, 1999, 2000
Istabraq	John James McManus Mem. Hurdle	3	1997, 1998, 1999
Jay Trump	Maryland Hunt Cup	3	1963, 1964, 1966
Jodami	Hennessy Gold Cup (Ireland)	3	1993, 1994, 1995
June Velocity	Tokyo High Jump	3	2024, 2025, 2026
June Velocity	Tokyo Jump Stakes	3	2023, 2024, 2025
Kapua	Hawkes Bay Hurdles	3	1893, 1894, 1895
Karasi	Nakayama Grand Jump	3	2005, 2006, 2007
Katko	Grand Steeple-Chase de Paris	3	1988, 1989, 1990
Kingsmark	Edward Hanmer Chase	3	2000, 2001, 2002
Klairon Davis	Normans Grove Chase	3	1998, 1999, 2001
Korok	Velká Pardubická	3	1969, 1971, 1972
Lady Anne	Velká Pardubická	3	1891, 1894, 1896
Lady Rebecca	Cleeve Hurdle	3	1999, 2000, 2001
Limestone Lad	Hatton's Grace Hurdle	3	1999, 2001, 2002
Limestone Lad	Morgiana Hurdle	3	1999, 2001, 2002
Loch Fyne	Auckland RC Winter Steeplechase	3	1907, 1908, 1910
Lord Venture	Great Western Steeplechase	3	1986, 1987, 1989
Master Meruit	Hawke's Bay Steeplechase	3	1946, 1948, 1949
McDynamo	Colonial Cup Hurdle Stakes	3	2003, 2005, 2006
Meli Melo	Prix La Haye Jousselin	3	1947, 1949, 1950
Menorah	Oaksey Chase	3	2014, 2015, 2016
Monet's Garden	Old Roan Chase	3	2007, 2009, 2010
Monksfield	Aintree Hurdle^{[b]}	3	1977, 1978, 1979
Native Upmanship	Kinloch Brae Chase	3	2002, 2003, 2004
Neji	American Grand National	3	1955, 1957, 1958
Nukumai	Wellington Hurdles	3	1924, 1927, 1931
Oju Chosan	Nakayama Daishogai	3	2016, 2017, 2021
Pages Raid	Lincoln Steeplechase	3	1946, 1947, 1949
Persian War	Champion Hurdle	3	1968, 1969, 1970
Peruan	Velká Pardubická	3	1998, 1999, 2000
Peter Simple	Great Western Steeplechase	3	1897, 1898, (Note: Dead-heated for first with Nimblefoot, but was declared the winner after the other horse fell in the run-off.) 1901
Quarrier	Royal Artillery Gold Cup	3	1984, 1986, 1987
Queen's Taste	Scottish Grand National	3	1953, 1954, 1956
Red Rum	Grand National	3	1973, 1974, 1977
Relkeel	Bula Hurdle	3	1997, 1998, 1999
Risk of Thunder	Frank Ward & Co Solicitors Chase	3	1995, 1996, 1998
Reve de Sivola	Long Walk Hurdle	3	2012, 2013, 2014
Sagar	Velká Pardubická	3	1981, 1982, 1983
See You Then	Champion Hurdle	3	1985, 1986, 1987
Senior Senator	Maryland Hunt Cup	3	2016, 2018, 2019
Sir Ken	Champion Hurdle	3	1952, 1953, 1954
Solerina	Hatton's Grace Hurdle	3	2003, 2004, 2005
Southern Countess	Tony Richards Toyota Hurdle	3	2009, 2010, 2011
Southern Hero	Scottish Grand National	3	1934, 1936, 1939
Storm Alert	United House Construction Chase	3	1993, 1994, 1996
Ten Up	Royal Artillery Gold Cup	3	1978, 1980, 1982
Tiger Roll	Glenfarclas Cross Country Chase	3	2018, 2019, 2021
Tipperary Boy	Galway Plate	3	1899, 1901, 1902
Tiumen	Velká Pardubická	3	2009, 2010, 2011
Travado	Haldon Gold Cup	3	1993, 1994, 1995
Trespasser	Imperial Cup	3	1920, 1921, 1922
Un de Sceaux	Clarence House Chase	3	2016, 2017, 2018
Wayward Lad	King George VI Chase	3	1982, 1983, 1985
Willie Wumpkins	Coral Golden Hurdle Final	3	1979, 1980, 1981
Yala Enki	Portman Cup Chase	3	2020, 2021, 2022
Zed Em	Von Doussa Steeplechase	3	2017, 2018, 2019

== Harness races ==
Horse	Race	Wins	Years
Frances Bulwark	Swedish Championship	6	1950, 1951, 1953, 1954, 1955, 1956
Delightful Lady	North Island Breeders Stakes	5	1979, 1980, 1981, 1982, 1983
Frances Bulwark	Scandinavian Championship	5	1950, 1952, 1953, 1954, 1955
Blacks A Fake	Inter Dominion Pacing Championship	4	2006, 2007, 2008, 2010
Gammalite	SA Cup Globe Derby Park	4	1982, 1983, 1984, 1985
Holmes D G	Kumeu Founders Cup	4	1999, 2000, 2001, 2002
Ourasi	Grand Critérium de Vitesse	4	1986, 1987, 1988, 1989
Ourasi	Prix d'Amérique	4	1986, 1987, 1988, 1990
Ourasi	Prix de Belgique	4	1986, 1987, 1988, 1989
Pride of Petite	City Of Sails Free-For-All	4	1994, 1995, 1997, 1998
Pure Steel	Western Australian Pacing Cup	4	1976, 1977, 1978, 1979
Smoken Up	Len Smith Mile	4	2008, 2010, 2011, 2012
Smoken Up	South Australian Cup	4	2008, 2010, 2012, 2013
The Count B	Canadian Pacing Derby	4	1944, 1945, 1947, 1948
Village Kid	Western Australian Pacing Cup	4	1984, 1985, 1987, 1988
Agua Caliente	Thames Pacing Cup	3	1998, 1999, 2000
Author Dillon	New Zealand Free For All	3	1918, 1919, 1920
Bellino II	Prix d'Amérique	3	1975, 1976, 1977
Birbone	Gran Premio Lotteria	3	1952, 1953, 1955
Blossom Lady	New Zealand Standardbred Breeders' Stakes	3	1991, 1992, 1993
Bonnie's Chance	New Zealand Standardbred Breeders' Stakes	3	1982, 1983, 1983
Caduceus	New Zealand Free For All	3	1956, 1958, 1959
Captain Harcourt	Waikato Flying Mile	3	1976, 1977, 1978
Classie Brigade	Kaikoura Cup	3	2019, 2020, 2021
False Step	New Zealand Trotting Cup	3	1958, 1959, 1960
Gidde Palema	Jubileumspokalen	3	2003, 2004, 2005
Grades Singing	Breeders Crown Open Mare Trot	3	1986, 1987, 1989
Hands Down	Easter Cup	3	1981, 1982, 1983
Harold Logan	New Zealand Free For All	3	1931, 1934, 1936
I Can Doosit	Kaikoura Free-For-All Trot	3	2010, 2011, 2012
I Can Doosit	Lyell Creek Stakes	3	2010, 2011, 2012
Idéal du Gazeau	European Grand Circuit	3	1980, 1981, 1982
Idéal du Gazeau	International Trot	3	1981, 1982, 1983
Im Themightyquinn	Fremantle Pacing Cup	3	2009, 2011, 2012
Im Themightyquinn	Inter Dominion Pacing Championship	3	2011, (Note: Declared winner after Smoken Up returned a positive drugs test. Various appeals are still before the Australian Courts.) 2012, 2013
Im Themightyquinn	Western Australian Pacing Cup	3	2011, 2012, 2013
Indianapolis	New Zealand Trotting Cup	3	1934, 1935, 1936
Jag de Bellouet	Prix de Cornulie	3	2004, 2005, 2006
Jag de Bellouet	Prix de l'Atlantique	3	2004, 2005, 2006
King of Swing	Miracle Mile Pace	3	2020, 2021, 2022
Koala King	Victoria Cup	3	1978, 1979, 1980
Lordship	New Zealand Free For All	3	1962, 1964, 1967
Lyell Creek	Dominion Handicap	3	1999, 2000, 2004
Lyell Creek	Rowe Cup	3	2000, 2001, 2004
Mack Grace Sm	Gran Premio Lotteria	3	2012, 2013, 2014
Meadow Roland	Copenhagen Cup	3	1988, 1989, 1990
Muscle Mountain	Ashburton Trotters Flying Mile	3	2021, 2022, 2023
Muscle Mountain	Summer Trotting Free-For-All	3	2021, 2022, 2023
Our Sir Vancelot	Inter Dominion Pacing Championship	3	1997, 1998, 1999
Ourasi	Prix du Bourbonnais	3	1985, 1986, 1988
Ourasi	Prix de Bourgogne	3	1987, 1988, 1989
Ourasi	Prix d'Europe	3	1985, 1986, 1988
Ourasi	Prix de France	3	1986, 1987, 1988
Pride of Petite	Lyell Creek Stakes	3	1994, 1996, 1997
Pronto Don	Golden West Trot	3	1951, 1952, 1953
Pure Steel	A G Hunter Cup	3	1977, 1978, 1980
Queen L.	Swedish Championship	3	1991, 1993, 1994
Rambling Willie	Canadian Pacing Derby	3	1975, 1976, 1977
Robalan	New Zealand Free For All	3	1972, 1973, 1964
Roquépine	Prix d'Amérique	3	1966, 1967, 1968
Tornese	Gran Premio Lotteria	3	1957, 1958, 1962
Tussle	Cambridge Trotters Flying Mile	3	1986, 1987, 1988
Uranie	Prix d'Amérique	3	1926, 1927, 1928
Sundees Son	Anzac Cup	3	2019, 2020, 2021
Sundees Son	Dominion Handicap	3	2020, 2021, 2022
Sundees Son	Ordeal Trotting Cup	3	2019, 2020, 2021
Take A Moment	Dominion Handicap^{[c]}	3	2001, 2002, 2003
Terror to Love	New Zealand Trotting Cup	3	2011, 2012, 2013
Une de Mai	European Grand Circuit	3	1969, 1970, 1971
Une de Mai	Gran Premio Lotteria	3	1969, 1970, 1971
Varenne	Gran Premio Lotteria	3	2000, 2001, 2002
Victory Tilly	Sundsvall Open Trot	3	2000, 2001, 2002
Won the West	American National Stakes	3	2007, 2008, 2009
Zoogin	Jubileumspokalen	3	1995, 1996, 1998

== Quarter Horse races ==
Horse	Race	Wins	Years
Had To Be Ivory	Ontario Bred Maturity	4	2019, 2021, 2022, 2023
Catchmeinyourdreams	Los Alamitos Invitational Championship	3	2003, 2004, 2005
Charger Bar	Chicado V Handicap	3	1971, 1973, 1974
Danjer	AQHA Challenge Championship	3	2020, 2021, 2022
Danjer	Canterbury Park Championship Challenge Stakes	3	2020, 2021, 2022
Danjer	Debbie Schauf Remington Park Invitational Championship Stakes	3	2021, 2022, 2023
Go Man Go	Clabbertown G Handicap	3	1956, 1957, 1958
Griswold	QHBC Marathon Classic	3	1991, 1993, 1994
Jessies First Down	Sam Houston Championship Challenge Trial	3	2015, 2016, 2017
Kaweah Bar	Hard Twist Stakes	3	1969, 1970, 1971
Kool Kue Baby	Sam Houston Classic	3	1995, 1996, 1998
Refrigerator	Champion of Champions	3	1992, 1993, 1994
Rylees Boy	Sunland Championship Challenge	3	2010, 2011, 2012
Rylees Boy	Sunland Championship Challenge Trial	3	2010, 2011, 2012
Sign of Lanty	Marathon Handicap	3	1999, 2000, 2001
SLM Big Daddy	Eastex Handicap	3	1997, 1998, 1999
Wascallywittlewabbit	Zia 870 Championship Stakes	3	2020, 2021, 2022

== Not specified ==
Horse	Race	Wins	Years
Registano	Grosser Preis der Bremer Spielbank	5	1993, 1994, 1995, 1996, 1997
Battle Eve	Avondale JC Stretto Stakes (Note: 2nd 1975, 1978)	3	1974, 1976, 1977
Catalogue	Canterbury JC Winter Cup	3	1937, 1938, 1939
Gold Chick	Mitchelson Cup^{[e]}	3	1963, 1965, 1966
Registano	Grosser Preis der Spielbank Hannover	3	1993, 1995, 1996
Rongonui	Canterbury JC Winter Cup	3	1988, 1989, 1990

== See also ==
- List of leading Thoroughbred racehorses
- List of historical horses
- Thoroughbred racing in New Zealand
- Harness racing in New Zealand
