= Zawawi =

Zawawi or Zouaoui may refer to:

== Places ==
- Zawawi Mosque, mosque in Muscat, Oman

== Events ==
- Zawawi Cup, Listed flat horse race in Sweden

== People ==
=== Given name ===
- Zawawi Mughni (born 1970), Malaysian politician

=== Middle name ===
- Mohd Zawawi Ismail (born 1959), Malaysian politician and teacher
- Muhamad Zawawi Azman (born 1994), Malaysian professional racing cyclist
- Nik Muhammad Zawawi Salleh (born 1967), Malaysian politician

=== Surname ===
- Ahmad Johnie Zawawi (born 1963), Malaysian politician
- Ibn Muti al-Zawawi (c. 1168-1169–1231), Maghrebi jurist
- Muhamad Zawawi Azman (born 1994), Malaysian professional racing cyclist
- Nagwan El-Zawawi (born 1976), Egyptian female weightlifter
- Phahrolrazi Mohd Zawawi (born 1953), Malaysian politician
- Qais Bin Abdul Munim Al Zawawi (1935–1995), Omani politician
- Wan Zawawi (1949–2017), Malaysian footballer
- Youssef Zouaoui (born 1946), Tunisian former footballer
