= Zouaoui =

Zouaoui or Zawawi may refer to:

== People ==
- Ahmed Zouaoui, a maliki mufti and faqih
- Ali Zouaoui, an economist and politician
- Anis Zouaoui, a handballer
- Ibn Muti al-Zawawi, a hanafi faqih
- Mohamed Zouaoui, an actor
- Muhamad Zawawi Azman, a racing cyclist
- Nagwan El-Zawawi, a weightlifter
- Nik Muhammad Zawawi Salleh, a politician
- Phahrolrazi Zawawi, a politician
- Qais Bin Abdul Munim Al Zawawi, a politician
- Vincent Zouaoui-Dandrieux, a long-distance runner
- Wan Zawawi, a footballer
- Youssef Zouaoui, a footballer
- Zawawi Mughni, a politician

== See also ==
- Zawawi Mosque, a mosque
- Ali Zouaoui Stadium, a stadium
- Zawawi Cup, a horse race
