= List of Italian jump horse races =

A list of all Group jump races over horse jumps which take place annually in Italy.

== Group 1 ==
| Month | Race Name | Type | Racecourse | Distance † | Age |
|---|---|---|---|---|---|
| February | Gran Corsa Siepi Nazionale | Hurdle | Pisa | 4,000 | 5yo + |
| April | Grande Steeple-Chase di Milano | Chase | Milan | 5,000 | 5yo + |
| June | Gran Corsa Siepi d'Italia | Hurdle | Merano | 4,000 | 5yo + |
| June | Grande Steeple-Chase d'Europa | Chase | Merano | 4,600 | 5yo + |
| September | Gran Criterium d'Autunno | Hurdle | Merano | 3,300 | 3yo |
| September | Gran Corsa Siepi di Merano | Hurdle | Merano | 4,000 | 5yo + |
| September | Gran Premio Merano | Chase | Merano | 5,000 | 4yo + |
| October | Gran Corsa Siepi di Milano | Hurdle | Milan | 4,000 | 4yo + |

== Group 2 ==
| Month | Race Name | Type | Racecourse | Distance † | Age |
|---|---|---|---|---|---|
| February | Criterium d'Inverno | Hurdle | Pisa | 3,500 | 4yo |
| April | Corsa Siepi dei 4 Anni | Hurdle | Milan | 3,600 | 4yo |
| June | Premio Ezio Vanoni | Chase | Merano | 3,900 | 4yo |
| June | Criterium di Primavera | Hurdle | Merano | 3,500 | 4yo |
| September | Premio delle Nazioni | Cross-Country | Merano | 6,000 | 5yo+ |
| September | Corsa Siepi dei 4 Anni | Hurdle | Merano | 3,500 | 4yo |
| October | Premio Steeple-Chases d'Italia | Chase | Merano | 3,900 | 4yo-5yo |
| November | Premio Giulio Berlingieri | Hurdle | Milan | 3,600 | 3yo |

== Group 3 ==
| Month | Race Name | Type | Racecourse | Distance † | Age |
|---|---|---|---|---|---|
| January | Gran Corsa Siepi di Pisa | Hurdle | Pisa | 3,500 | 5yo + |
| June | Grande Steeple-Chase di Roma | Cross-Country | Merano | 5,000 | 5yo + |
| August | Premio Piero e Franco Richard | Chase | Merano | 3,900 | 4yo-5yo |
| September | Premio A.S.S.I. | Chase | Merano | 4,500 | 5yo + |
| September | Premio Ettore Tagliabue | Hurdle | Merano | 3,300 | 3yo |
