= Crystal Cup (steeplechasing) =

Series of European steeplechase horse races

The Crystal Cup European Cross Country Challenge is an annual series of steeplechase horse races in Europe. The series was introduced in 2010 although most of the individual races are much older.

Points are awarded to the first six finishers in each race, with bonuses for horses from abroad and for the final race. The main prize is for the trainer whose stable's horses have accumulated the most points, with additional trophies for the top horse and top jockey.

Races in the Crystal Cup series
Race	Course	Country	Date	Prize fund (€)	Notes
Grand Cross de Pau Reverdy (Prix Gaston de Bataille)	Pau	France	February	70,000	
Cross Country Chase	Cheltenham	England	March	74,000	During the Cheltenham Festival
Grand Steeple-Chase Cross Country de Fontainebleau	Fontainebleau	France	April	40,000	
Anjou-Loire Challenge	Le Lion-d'Angers	France	May	112,000	
Crystal Cup Partynice Wrocław	Wrocław	Poland	June	40,000	Associate member 2016, full member 2017
Grand Steeple-Chase des Flandres	Waregem	Belgium	August/September	100,000	
Grand Cross de Craon	Craon	France	September	75,000	
Gran Premio Merano	Merano	Italy	September	40,000	
Velká pardubická	Pardubice	Czech Republic	October	178,000	
Grand Steeple Chase-Cross-Country de Compiègne	Compiègne	France	November	40,000	
Cross Country Handicap Chase	Cheltenham	England	December	48,000	During the International Hurdle meeting
Races formerly part of the Crystal Cup
La Touche Cup	Punchestown	Ireland	April	28,500 (2016)	Member 2010–2016
Crystal Cup Cross-Country Challenge	Frauenfeld	Switzerland	May	33,000 (2015)	Member 2015–2016
