= Crystal Cup =

Crystal Cup may refer to:

- Crystal Cup (cycling) U.S. Air Force cycle race
- Crystal Cup (steeplechasing) European horserace series
- The Crystal Cup, a 1927 film.

== See also ==
- Waterford Crystal Cup 2006–2015 Munster hurling competition
