= Mohamed Yehia Zakaria =

Emirati businessman of Egyptian origin (born 1938)

Mohamed Yehia Zakaria (born May 10, 1938) is an Emirati businessman of Egyptian origin. He is the longest-serving chief executive of the beverage industry in the Middle East. He is the co-founder and was chief executive of Dubai Refreshments (Pepsi), in Dubai, and institutionalized the soft drink industry in the Middle East.

== Education and career ==
A graduate of Cairo University with a bachelor's degree in Commerce, Mohamed Zakaria arrived in Dubai in 1960 to gain work experience and then afterward, attend Michigan State University where he had been accepted for an MBA. His previous work in Egypt at the Government Accountancy Department, promoted him to explore an offer he had gotten by the late Sultan bin Ali Al Owais, a philanthropist, poet, businessman, and former Minister of the UAE. In early 1962, he was appointed the head accountant for the Al Owais family business. Along with Shaikh Rashid bin Saeed Al Maktoum the Al Owais, Al Mulla family and Qais Bin Abdul Munaim Al Zawawi, he negotiated the deal to make Dubai the first place in the Middle East to bottle, distribute and market the Pepsi brand.

In 1974, along with the late Qais Bin Abdul Munaim Al Zawawi the Deputy Prime Minister for Economic and Financial Affairs of Oman, the first soft drink and beverage manufacturer was brought to the Sultanate. He is its founder, and until 2006, the Managing Director.

He is also a founding member of the National Bank of Dubai in 1962, which later merged in 2009 to form Emirates NBD.

In 1980, along with Sheikh Rashid bin Saeed Al Maktoum and Sultan Al Owais he founded, Jeema Mineral Water Company. In 1999 he introduced private labeling to the region.

In 2000, under his leadership, Pepsi in Dubai captured 70% of the UAE market share and had its highest ever net profit of 17 AED million.

In 2002, Zakaria retired from active duty, although he still retains a significant share in the businesses he founded in both Dubai and Oman. Today he runs a real estate portfolio in Europe, the Middle East and Africa, and has stakes in active UAE and Omani based industries.

== Family ==
He married Shadia Shahwan (1944–1998) in 1966 and has four children, Ghada, Nashwa, May, and Ahmed. He has since remarried in 2006. His children hold active roles in Dubai and Abu Dhabi Government run companies, and they also operate the day-to-day activities of the family business.

== Positions held ==
Company Name	Position Held	Years
Oman Refreshments	Founder & managing director	1974–present
Dubai Refreshments	Co-founder & chief executive	1962–2002
Jeema Mineral Water	Co-founder & managing director	1980–2006
RC Cola Egypt	Chairman	1984–1990
United Can Company	Managing director	1977–1999
Arabian Advertising Agency (Dubai)	Co-founder & partner	1984–1995
AhmadCo Ltd.	Director	1981–2007
Zakaria Enterprises	Chairman	1962–present
Zakaria Investments Ltd.	Honorary chairman	2007–present
TeleMedia Misr	Advisor	2000–2005
