= Papelon =

Chilean racehorse

- Sire: Monthir
- Grandsire: Gulch
- Dam: Encubierta
- Damsire: Edgy Diplomat
- Sex: Stallion
- Foaled: July 22, 2006
- Country: Chile
- Colour: Chestnut
- Breeder: Haras San Patricio
- Owner: Stud Kekita
- Record: 49: 21-8-8
- Earnings: CLP$269,836,129

Major wins
- Clásico Thompson Matthews (2010) Clásico Municipal de Viña del Mar (2010, 2012); Clásico Club Hípico de Santiago Falabella (2010, 2012, 2013, 2014); Clásico Primavera Hernan Braun P. y Carolina Budge de B. (2010, 2012, 2013); Clásico Verano Arturo Cousiño L. (2011); Clásico Otoño Pedro Garcia de la Huerta M. (2013) Clásico Invierno Sergio del Sante M. (2013)

Awards
- Chilean Champion Three-Year-Old Turf Male (2009/2010) Chilean Champion Older Horse (2010/11, 2012/13); Chilean Champion Older Turf Horse (2013/14) Chilean Champion Turf Horse (2011/12)

Papelon (foaled 22 July 2006), also spelled Papelón, is a Chilean Thoroughbred racehorse best known for winning the Group 1 Clásico Club Hípico de Santiago Falabella four times. He was named a Chilean divisional champion for five years and was considered the 'King of Staying' in Chile during his career.

== Background ==
Papelon is a chestnut stallion with an off-center star and a small strip. Papelon was bred by Haras San Patricio.

Papelon's sire, Monthir, was bred and raced in the United States. Monthir was thought to have promise for the Kentucky Derby as a two-year-old, but he failed to win any stakes races, although he did finish second in the Grade 3 Nashua Stakes and Grade 2 Hutcheson Stakes and third in the Grade 3 Bay Shore Stakes. Monthir was exported to Chile to stand at Haras San Patricio. Papelon was part of Monthir's second crop.

Papelon's dam Encubierta was unraced and had produced two foals before Papelon, of which one was unraced and the other won twice. Encubierta is a full sister to Escania, Chilean Champion 2-Year-Old Dirt Filly and winner of the Group 1 Tanteo de Potrancas, and Eccellenza, Chilean Champion 2-Year-Old Dirt Filly and Champion 3-Year-Old Dirt Filly and winner of the Group 1 Tanteo de Potrancas and Group 1 Mil Guineas.

Papelon was named after an anecdote from Dr. Ignacio Coloma's father.

Papelon was owned by Stud Kekita and trained by Carlos Urbina during his racing career. He specialized in long distance turf races and heavy track conditions.

== Racing career ==
=== 2008/09: Two-year-old season ===
Papelon ran five times in 2009 as a two-year-old, all in maiden races at Hipódromo Chile on the dirt. He lost all five races, although he did finish third twice and second once.

=== 2009/10: Three-year-old season ===
Papelon broke his maiden on his seventh try, in his second race as a three-year-old, on July 30, 2009. He won the 1200-meter race at Hipódromo Chile by five and a half lengths. Papelon's connections then pointed him towards stakes races, starting with the Group 2 Clásico Domingo Segundo Herrera Martínez on August 15, run over 1500 meters on the dirt at Hipódromo Chile. Papelon finished fourth, but ran credibly enough that he was next entered in the Group 1 Dos Mil Guineas, a 1600-meter dirt race at Hipódromo Chile. In the Dos Mil Guineas, Papelon performed poorly, finishing second to last in the fourteen-horse field, seventeen lengths behind the winner.

Within the month, Papelon raced again, in his first race at a new track, finishing second in the 1700-meter Clásico Criadores F. S. de Carreras S. A., an ungraded stakes race run at Valparaiso Sporting Club. He next ran at the third of Chile's major racetracks, and the track where he would eventually mark his greatest victories: Club Hípico de Santiago. The race, the listed stakes Clásico Preparación Luis Cousiño S., was also his first time running clockwise, on the turf, and at a distance of 2000 meters. Papelon won the race by a head, and was next pointed to the Group 1 Clásico El Ensayo, one of the most important races on the Chilean calendar and first race of the Chilean Triple Crown. In the Clásico El Ensayo, Papelon ran fourth behind Belle Watling, who would go on to be the Chilean Horse of the Year for that season. Papelon faced Belle Watling again in his last race of 2009, the Group 2 Gran Clásico Coronación, finished second to her by two and a quarter lengths.

In January 2010, Papelon ran in the Group 1 Clásico El Derby at Valparaiso Sporting Club and finished sixth. He remained at Valparaiso Sporting Club through March and achieved his first graded stakes victories there, winning the Group 3 Clásico Thompson Matthews and Group 2 Clásico Municipal de Viña del Mar, with the latter being his first race against older horses.

Papelon then returned to Club Hípico de Santiago for the Group 1 Clásico Club Hípico de Santiago Falabella, the most important race in Chile for turf stayers. He was one of three three-year-olds in the race. Papelon won the 2000-meter race by one and a quarter lengths in a time of 1:56.00. With the win, Papelon earned an entry into the Group 1 Gran Premio Latinoamericano, run at Club Hípico de Santiago that year, also over 2000 meters on the turf. The Gran Premio Latinoamericano had originally been slated to be run in March 2010, but was postponed to September due to an earthquake.

In total, Papelon won five of twelve starts and was named the Chilean Champion Three-Year-Old Turf Male for his campaign.

=== 2010/11: Four-year-old season ===
Papelon's first race as a four-year-old was the ungraded stakes Clásico Estados Unidos de América on July 16, run over 1700 meters on the turf at Club Hípico de Santiago. He won, and headed towards the Gran Premio Latinoamericano on a four-race long win streak, all in stakes races. Papelon finished fourth in the Gran Premio Latinoamericano behind Belle Watling, but acquitted himself well in what was later called "one of the most emotional finishes of the Latinos" by El Turf.

In October 2010, Papelon won the first of an eventual three Group 3 Clásicos Primavera Hernan Braun P. y Carolina Budge de B., and he finished third in the Group 3 Clásico La Copa to finish out 2010. Papelon won the Group 3 Clásico Verano Arturo Cousiño L. in February 2011 before heading outside Chile for the first time to run in the 2011 Gran Premio Latinoamericano, run over 2000 meters on the turf at Hipódromo de San Isidro that year. In the race, he closed late and failed to make up enough ground, finishing fifth.

Papelon returned to Chile to run in his second Clásico Club Hípico de Santiago Falabella in May 2011, his final race as a four-year-old. Despite starting as the favorite, he failed to repeat his previous performance, finishing third behind the three-year-old Sin Respeto.

In total, Papelon won three of seven starts as a four-year-old and was named the Chilean Champion Older Horse for his campaign.

=== 2011/12: Five-year-old season ===
Papelon didn't return to the racetrack until December 2011, when he won the ungraded stakes Clásico Mega at Club Hípico de Santiago. He next raced in March 2012, taking the Group 2 Clásico Municipal de Viña del Mar, before finishing third in the Group 3 Clásico Otoño Pedro Garcia de la Huerta M. in April.

In late May, Papelon ran in the Clásico Club Hípico de Santiago Falabella for the third time. The turf track was heavy, a condition that Papelon favored, and he won by five lengths.

He raced once more as a five-year-old, finishing second in the Group 3 Clásico Invierno Sergio del Sante M. as the favorite.

In total, Papelon won three of five starts as a five-year-old, including the Group 2 Clásico Municipal de Viña del Mar and his second Clásico Club Hípico de Santiago Falabella, and was named the Chilean Champion Grass Horse for his campaign.

=== 2012/13: Six-year-old season ===
In his first start as a six-year-old, Papelon again won the Clásico Estados Unidos de América before finishing fourth in the Group 2 Clásico Copa de Oro. He won his next two starts, the Group 3 Clásico Primavera Hernan Braun P. y Carolina Budge de B. and the ungraded Clásico Raúl Ovalle U., then ran second in the ungraded Clásico Torbita and Group 2 Clásico Verano Arturo Cousiño L. He added a win in the listed Clásico Luis Aldunate C. and a third in the Group 2 Clásico Copa de Oro Viñas de Chile, all run at Club Hípico de Santiago, before heading to Hipódromo Chile for the Group 1 Gran Premio Hipódromo Chile, in which he finished fourth.

In May, Papelon achieved the unprecedented feat of winning a third Clásico Club Hípico de Santiago Falabella when he won the race by four and a half lengths. He closed out his six-year-old season with a win in the Group 2 Clásico Otoño Pedro Garcia de la Huerta M.

In total, Papelon won six of eleven starts as a six-year-old, including the Group 3 Clásico Primavera Hernan Braun P. y Carolina Budge de B., Group 2 Clásico Otoño Pedro Garcia de la Huerta M., and his third Clásico Club Hípico de Santiago Falabella, with the year being regarded as his best. He was named the Chilean Champion Older Horse for his campaign.

=== 2013/14: Seven-year-old season ===
Papelon won the Group 3 Clásico Invierno Sergio del Sante M. in his first race as a seven-year-old in July 2013 before heading to Hipódromo Chile, where he ran third in the Group 3 Clásico Libertador Bernardo O'Higgens Riquelme. Returning to Club Hípico de Santiago, he won the listed Clásico Carreras del '20 and his third Clásico Primavera Hernan Braun P. y Carolina Budge de B., finished second in the Group 3 Clásico La Copa and Group 2 Clásico Verano Arturo Cousiño L., and third in the ungraded Clásico Tobrita.

Papelon attempted the Gran Premio Hipódromo Chile again in 2014, again finishing fourth, before running in the Clásico Club Hípico de Santiago Falabella for the fifth time and winning it for the fourth.

Following the win, Papelon went to Hipódromo Chile to train, but suffered a significant injury that forced his retirement from racing. According to Dr. Ignacio Coloma of Haras San Patricio, the injury was severe enough to kill most horses.

In total, Papelon won four of nine starts as a seven-year-old, including the Group 3 Clásico Invierno Sergio del Sante M., Group 3 Clásico Primavera Hernan Braun P. y Carolina Budge de B., and his fourth Clásico Club Hípico de Santiago Falabella. He was named the Chilean Champion Older Turf Horse for his campaign.

Papelon retired with earnings of CLP$269,836,129, a record of 21 wins in 49 starts, including four editions of the Group 1 Clásico Club Hípico de Santiago Falabella and five Group 3 and four Group 2 wins, and five Chilean divisional championships.

== Race record ==
Date	Age	Distance	Surface	Race	Grade	Track	Odds	Field	Finish	Time	Winning (Losing) margin	Jockey	Ref
Apr 18, 2009	2	1200 meters	Dirt	Premio Declarado	Maiden	Hipódromo Chile	41.1	15	5	1:13.42	(7 1/2 lengths)	Rodrigo Lizama	
Apr 30, 2009	2	1300 meters	Dirt	Premio Fajador	Maiden	Hipódromo Chile	14.2	13	3	1:20.67	(1 1/4 lengths)	Rodrigo Lizama	
May 23, 2009	2	1500 meters	Dirt	Premio Magari	Maiden	Hipódromo Chile	4.3	15	5	1:33.22	(5 1/4 lengths)	Fernando Díaz	
Jun 11, 2009	2	1500 meters	Dirt	Premio Rabel	Maiden	Hipódromo Chile	6.8	11	2	1:34.01	(Neck)	David Sánchez	
Jun 27, 2009	2	1500 meters	Dirt	Premio Michelangelo	Maiden	Hipódromo Chile	3.0	13	3	1:32.29	(7 1/2 lengths)	Jaime Medina	
Jul 4, 2009	3	1300 meters	Dirt	Premio Banderín	Maiden	Hipódromo Chile	4.4	15	4	1:19.25	(5 1/4 lengths)	Anyelo Rivera	
Jul 30, 2009	3	1200 meters	Dirt	Premio Huascar	Maiden	Hipódromo Chile	2.7*	14	1	1:13.32	5 1/2 lengths	David Sánchez	
Aug 15, 2009	3	1500 meters	Dirt	Clásico Domingo Segundo Herrera Martínez	II	Hipódromo Chile	13.6	16	4	1:29.04	(10 3/4 lengths)	Jaime Medina	
Sep 5, 2009	3	1600 meters	Dirt	Dos Mil Guineas	I	Hipódromo Chile	35.8	14	13	1:34.92	(17 lengths)	Nelson Figueroa	
Sep 30, 2009	3	1700 meters	Dirt	Clásico Criadores F. S. de Carreras S. A.	Stakes	Valparaiso Sporting Club	4.7	12	2	1:42.08	(1 1/4 lengths)	Jaime Medina	
Oct 16, 2009	3	2000 meters	Turf	Clásico Preparación Luis Cousiño S.	Listed	Club Hípico de Santiago	10.9	6	1	2:00.90	Head	Anyelo Rivera	
Nov 1, 2009	3	2400 meters	Turf	Clásico El Ensayo	I	Club Hípico de Santiago	14.2	15	4	2:24.50	(4 lengths)	Fernando Díaz	
Dec 27, 2009	3	2000 meters	Turf	Gran Clásico Coronación	II	Club Hípico de Santiago	9.1	10	2	1:58.63	(2 1/4 lengths)	Fernando Díaz	
Jan 31, 2010	3	2400 meters	Dirt	Clásico El Derby	I	Valparaiso Sporting Club	5.3	16	6	2:23.92	(10 3/4 lengths)	Fernando Díaz	
Mar 5, 2010	3	1600 meters	Turf	Clásico Thompson Matthews	III	Valparaiso Sporting Club	1.6*	7	1	1:35.67	1/2 length	Luis Torres	
Mar 31, 2010	3	1900 meters	Turf	Clásico Municipal de Viña del Mar	II	Valparaiso Sporting Club	1.7*	11	1	1:54.31	2 3/4 lengths	Jaime Medina	
May 2, 2010	3	2000 meters	Turf	Clásico Club Hípico de Santiago Falabella	I	Club Hípico de Santiago	4.2	11	1	1:56.00	1 3/4 lengths	Luis Torres	
Jul 16, 2010	4	1700 meters	Turf	Clásico Estados Unidos de América	Stakes	Club Hípico de Santiago	2.5	9	1	1:43.43	1 1/4 lengths	Luis Torres	
Sep 17, 2010	4	2000 meters	Turf	Gran Premio Latinoamericano	I	Club Hípico de Santiago	4.2	7	4	1:59.81	(1/2 length)	Luis Torres	
Oct 18, 2010	4	2000 meters	Turf	Clásico Primavera Hernan Braun P. y Carolina Budge de B.	III	Club Hípico de Santiago	1.6*	7	1	2:00.08	1/2 neck	Luis Torres	
Nov 19, 2010	4	2400 meters	Turf	Clásico La Copa	III	Club Hípico de Santiago	1.5*	6	3	2:27.97	(1/2 length)	Luis Torres	
Feb 11, 2011	4	2000 meters	Turf	Clásico Verano Arturo Cousiño L.	II	Club Hípico de Santiago	2.1*	14	1	1:59.16	1 1/2 lengths	Luis Torres	
Mar 12, 2011	4	2000 meters	Turf	Gran Premio Latinoamericano	I	Hipódromo de San Isidro	14.1	16	5	2:00.40	(6 lengths)	Chamorro L. Torres	
May 1, 2011	4	2000 meters	Turf	Clásico Club Hípico de Santiago Falabella	I	Club Hípico de Santiago	2.8*	15	3	1:55.91	(3 1/2 lengths)	Luis Torres	
Dec 23, 2011	5	1700 meters	Turf	Clásico Mega	Stakes	Club Hípico de Santiago	1.5*	6	1	1:40.70	2 1/4 lengths	Jaime Medina	
Mar 14, 2012	5	1900 meters	Turf	Clásico Municipal de Viña del Mar	II	Valparaiso Sporting Club	3.0	15	1	1:53.29	2 1/4 lengths	Jaime Medina	
Apr 5, 2012	5	2000 meters	Turf	Clásico Otoño Pedro Garcia de la Huerta M.	II	Club Hípico de Santiago	2.7	5	3	1:59.07	(2 1/2 lengths)	Jaime Medina	
May 27, 2012	5	2000 meters	Turf	Clásico Club Hípico de Santiago Falabella	I	Club Hípico de Santiago	6.4	10	1	2:03.24	5 lengths	Fernando Díaz	
Jun 24, 2012	5	2000 meters	Turf	Clásico Invierno Sergio del Sante M.	III	Club Hípico de Santiago	1.6*	7	2	2:03.25	(1 length)	Fernando Díaz	
Jul 16, 2012	6	1800 meters	Turf	Clásico Estados Unidos de América	Stakes	Club Hípico de Santiago	1.4*	5	1	1:49.24	3/4 length	Jaime Medina	
Aug 13, 2012	6	2000 meters	Turf	Clásico Copa de Oro	II	Club Hípico de Santiago	1.2*	7	4	1:59.58	(6 3/4 lengths)	Oscar Ulloa	
Oct 12, 2012	6	2000 meters	Turf	Clásico Primavera Hernan Braun P. y Carolina Budge de B.	III	Club Hípico de Santiago	2.5	4	1	2:02.80	1/2 neck	Luis Torres	
Nov 2, 2012	6	2000 meters	Turf	Clásico Raúl Ovalle U.	Stakes	Club Hípico de Santiago	2.7	7	1	1:56.43	1/2 length	Luis Torres	
Jan 6, 2013	6	2000 meters	Turf	Clásico Tobrita	Stakes	Club Hípico de Santiago	1.9*	5	2	1:59.43	(Nose)	Luis Torres	
Feb 1, 2013	6	2000 meters	Turf	Clásico Verano Arturo Cousiño L.	II	Club Hípico de Santiago	1.8*	6	2	1:58.01	(1/2 length)	Luis Torres	
Mar 3, 2013	6	2000 meters	Turf	Clásico Luis Aldunate C.	Listed	Club Hípico de Santiago	1.8*	5	1	1:58.08	1/2 length	Luis Torres	
Apr 14, 2013	6	1800 meters	Dirt	Clásico Copa de Oro Viñas de Chile	II	Club Hípico de Santiago	6.8	17	3	1:46.43	(2 3/4 lengths)	Luis Torres	
May 4, 2013	6	2200 meters	Dirt	Clásico Internacional Gran Premio Hipódromo Chile	I	Hipódromo Chile	4.4*	16	4	2:20.37	(3 lengths)	Luis Torres	
May 31, 2013	6	2000 meters	Turf	Clásico Club Hípico de Santiago Falabella	I	Club Hípico de Santiago	2.1	11	1	2:02.22	4 1/2 lengths	Luis Torres	
Jun 28, 2013	6	2000 meters	Turf	Clásico Otoño Pedro Garcia de la Huerta M.	II	Club Hípico de Santiago	1.2*	6	1	2:02.69	3/4 length	Luis Torres	
Jul 19, 2013	7	2000 meters	Turf	Clásico Invierno Sergio del Sante M.	III	Club Hípico de Santiago	1.5*	6	1	1:57.58	1 1/4 lengths	Luis Torres	
Aug 10, 2013	7	2000 meters	Dirt	Clásico Libertador Bernardo O'Higgens Riquelme	III	Hipódromo Chile	2.9	5	3	2:03.00	(6 3/4 lengths)	Luis Torres	
Sep 20, 2013	7	2000 meters	Turf	Clásico Carreras del '20	Listed	Club Hípico de Santiago	1.4*	3	1	2:00.80	1 3/4 lengths	Luis Torres	
Oct 11, 2013	7	2000 meters	Turf	Clásico Primavera Hernan Braun P. y Carolina Budge de B.	III	Club Hípico de Santiago	1.1*	3	1	1:59.51	2 1/4 lengths	Luis Torres	
Dec 2, 2013	7	2400 meters	Turf	Clásico La Copa	III	Club Hípico de Santiago	1.3*	4	2	2:26.71	(Neck)	Luis Torres	
Jan 5, 2014	7	2000 meters	Turf	Clásico Tobrita	Stakes	Club Hípico de Santiago	1.4*	5	3	2:01.50	(3 1/4 lengths)	Luis Torres	
Feb 14, 2014	7	2000 meters	Turf	Clásico Verano Arturo Cousiño L.	II	Club Hípico de Santiago	1.5*	4	2	2:00.01	(3/4 length)	Luis Torres	
May 3, 2014	7	2200 meters	Dirt	Gran Premio Hipódromo Chile	I	Hipódromo de Chile	11.5	13	4	2:18.84	(12 3/4 lengths)	Jaime Medina	
Jun 8, 2014	7	2000 meters	Turf	Clásico Club Hípico de Santiago Falabella	I	Club Hípico de Santiago	2.5*	15	1	2:02.61	2 1/2 lengths	Luis Torres	

An asterisk after the odds means Papelon was the post time favorite.

== Stud career ==
After retiring from racing, Papelon entered stud at Haras San Patricio where he was bred. He has had limited success at stud, with his most successful progeny being the Group 3-placed colt El Mañio.

== Pedigree ==
Pedigree of Papelon (CHI), chestnut stallion, foaled July 22, 2006
Sire Monthir (USA) 1999	Gulch (USA); 1984	Mr. Prospector (USA)	Raise a Native (USA)
Sire Monthir (USA) 1999	Gulch (USA); 1984	Mr. Prospector (USA)	Gold Digger (USA)
Sire Monthir (USA) 1999	Gulch (USA); 1984	Jameela (USA)	Rambunctious (USA)
Sire Monthir (USA) 1999	Gulch (USA); 1984	Jameela (USA)	Asbury Mary (USA)
Sire Monthir (USA) 1999	Caress (USA); 1991	Storm Cat (USA)	Storm Bird (CAN)
Sire Monthir (USA) 1999	Caress (USA); 1991	Storm Cat (USA)	Terlingua (USA)
Sire Monthir (USA) 1999	Caress (USA); 1991	La Affirmed (USA)	Affirmed (USA)
Sire Monthir (USA) 1999	Caress (USA); 1991	La Affirmed (USA)	La Mesa (USA)
Dam Encubierta (CHI) 1997	Edgy Diplomat (USA); 1986	Deputy Minister (CAN)	Vice Regent (CAN)
Dam Encubierta (CHI) 1997	Edgy Diplomat (USA); 1986	Deputy Minister (CAN)	Mint Copy (CAN)
Dam Encubierta (CHI) 1997	Edgy Diplomat (USA); 1986	Excitable Gal (USA)	Secretariat (USA)
Dam Encubierta (CHI) 1997	Edgy Diplomat (USA); 1986	Excitable Gal (USA)	Magazine (USA)
Dam Encubierta (CHI) 1997	Carezza (CHI); 1987	Card Game (IRE)	Thatch (USA)
Dam Encubierta (CHI) 1997	Carezza (CHI); 1987	Card Game (IRE)	Fortunal (IRE)
Dam Encubierta (CHI) 1997	Carezza (CHI); 1987	Romantica (CHI)	Rigel (ARG)
Dam Encubierta (CHI) 1997	Carezza (CHI); 1987	Romantica (CHI)	Fanatica (CHI)

== See also ==
- Repeat winners of horse races
