= Rugbyclub Waereghem =

Belgian rugby union club, based in Waregem

Belgium
- Founded: 2009; 17 years ago
- Location: Waregem, Belgium
- Ground: Sportterein De Uitbreiding
- Chairman: Tom Cheese
- Coach: Lukas Bruyneel
- League: Regionale Vlaanderen 1 (gold)
Team kit

Official website
- www.rugbyclubwaregem.be

Rugbyclub Waereghem is a Belgian rugby club in Waregem.

== History ==
The club was founded in 2009. Two years later the clubhouse was lost in a fire. In 2014 the men's team obtained promotion to the Flemish Regional 1 division. In 2019 a new clubhouse was built.

In 2025, the men of Rugbyclub Waereghem were crowned champions of the Vlaanderen Regionale 1 league after a dominant season. The title was secured with a commanding 34–10 victory over direct rivals Pitbulls Arendonk on April 27. Waereghem finished the season with 16 wins out of 18 matches, claiming the first title in the club's history.

== 2024-2025 Championship Squad ==
=== Front row players ===
Boeve A. - Bouvijn B. (c) - Cambier G. - Carpentier L. - Chys A. - Commere A. - Feys M. - Gevaert N. - Southcott L. - Tyvaert P.

=== Second row players ===
De Graeve N. - De Smeytere L. - Goethals A. - Laverge J. - Opsomer M. - Vanhee W.

=== Back row players ===
Baïda M. - Corvelyn J. - Declerck T. - Nijs R. - Ornelis S. - Roque R. - Vancauwenberghe J. - Vandevelde K.

=== Scrum-halves ===
Dekie M. - De Wilde M. - Parmentier J.

=== Fly-halves ===
Rottiers L. - Van Herpe L.

=== Center Backs ===
Dekie T. - Lehembre S. - Mastelinck A. - Naessens M.

=== Wingers ===
Aliseo D. - Barbe J. - Bruggeman S. - Dejager L. - Deleersnijder B. - Devriendt S.

=== Fullbacks ===
Hobo E. - Van Parijs J.
