= Grand Steeple-Chase des Flandres =

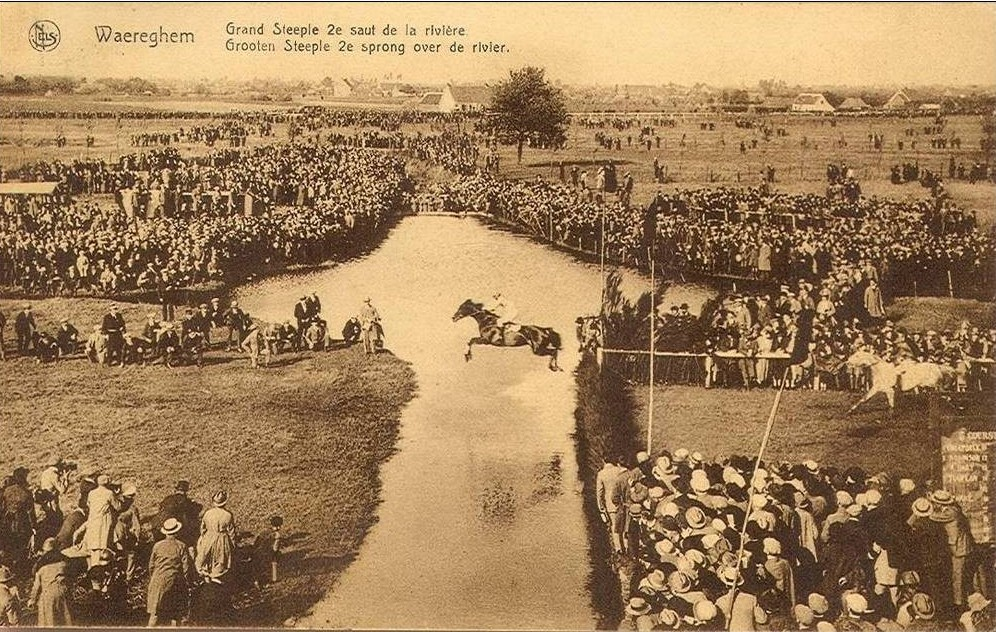
The Gaverbeek water jump in the 1920 Grand Steeple-Chase des Flandres

The Grand Steeple-Chase des Flandres (Grote Steeple-chase van Vlaanderen; "great steeplechase of Flanders") is a horserace held annually at the Hippodrome Waregem in Waregem, Belgium. It is the centrepiece of the Waregem Koerse ("Waregem Races") meeting, held on the Tuesday of the Waregem Koerse Feesten, a kermesse which begins on the weekend of the last Sunday in August. Local businesses often close for the kermesse. The race is sometimes described as the Belgian Grand National, by analogy with the (English) Grand National. It has a distance of 4600m, with 25 obstacles, the most spectacular of which is the water jump across the Gaverbeek river, which is in front of the grandstand and taken twice in the race. In 1990 the water jumpwas redesigned to reduce the frequency of horses breaking legs; it faced continued criticism from animal welfare activists after deaths there in 2012. The Waregem Koerse was first held in 1849 on the city's cobbled streets; the Steeple-Chase was first held in 1858, sponsored by French businessman Marc Lejeune. In its early decades it was one of the most prestigious horseraces in Europe. It declined after the Second World War when French prize money grew, but recovered somewhat from the 1980s. In the 1990s there was an increase in the number of British entries, from smaller stables. Multiple winners include Spectre (five wins in the 1870s), Redpath (seven wins 1880s–1890s) and Taupin Rochelais (three wins 2015–2017). Since 2010 the race has formed part of the Crystal Cup series of European steeplechases.
