= Ivor Hill =

- Sire: Magical Bid
- Grandsire: Danehill
- Dam: Victoria Rose
- Damsire: Masterclass
- Sex: Gelding
- Foaled: August 24, 2007; La Pouéo, Bourail
- Country: New Caledonia
- Colour: Bay
- Breeder: Charles Ohlen, Yves Dorso
- Owner: Charles Brinon
- Trainer: Carole Tual
- Record: 41:38-2-0
- Earnings: ₣: 21,771,500

Major wins
- Coupe Clarke (2013,2014,2015); Bourail Cup (2012,2014,2015,2016,2017); Prix Rémo Tiburzio (2013); Grand Prix Des Sprinters Jacques Lafleur (2015,2016); Grand Prix De La Province Sud (2012,2013,2014,2015,2017); Classique Jean-Yves Lacrose (2012,2013,2014,2015)

Awards
- New Caledonia Champion Sprinter (2012,2013); New Caledonia Best Local Horse (2013)

Honours
- Grand Prix Ivor Hill (G3)

Ivor Hill (August 24, 2007 – April 12, 2021) is a champion racehorse bred and raced in the French overseas territory of New Caledonia, regarded by many as the greatest horse to ever to race there. His two highest achievements while racing were a near perfect record which saw him win 24 consecutive races, and his 3 consecutive victories in the Coupe Clarke the biggest horse race in New Caledonia.

== Background ==
On August 24, 2007, Ivor Hill would be born in La Pouéo, Bourail on the property of Charles Ohlen. He was also bred by Yves Dorso, both breeders were also owners of his dam Victoria Rose an imported broodmare from New Zealand who Ivor Hill was her first foal. She went on to produce other successful horses in New Caledonia such as champion 3-year-old L'Nominoe and Golden Bid, the half siblings ran against each other multiple times. His sire Magical Bid stood in Bourail for years and is himself sired by Hall of Fame sire Danehill.

When the horse was a yearling he was acquired by Charles Brinon. Charles initially had plans to sell the horse as Ivor Hill had knee problems early in his life that prevented him from working and showing his potential. He was unsuccessfully put up for sale at a reserve price of ₣350,000 on April 9, 2011, but the only buyer interested wanted him for less and so he was not sold and Brinon kept him.

== Racing career ==
After failing to sell Ivor Hill Brinon changed plans to race him running him for the first time on April 30, 2011, when Ivor Hill was 3-years-old. Ivor Hill won his first race but did not run again until November 6, 2011, when he ran in the Grade 3 Gold Cup Classique. It was the only time Ivor Hill ever finished worse than second as he was a well beaten 10th at the finish line losing to a horse named Spectaline. It was his last race as a 3-year-old. His first full season came when he was 4 in 2012. Around this time his knee problems had subsided and he was described by his new trainer Carole Tual as "a horse with character, who likes to initially try and dominate whoever was around him traits desired in a sprinter like him. He ran a total of 9 times with only a single loss this season. His first attempt at top class racing came in the local Grade 1 Grand Prix Des Sprinters Jacques Lafleur. Running the 975 meters in 53 4/5 seconds which was a new track record. He also took his first Bourail Cup, and Classique Jean-Yves Lacrose in the ladder he defeated Spectaline. Over his long career he would win these races repeatedly and go on to win them more times than any horse before or since. On route to being named Champion Sprinter.

When 2013 hit more important things occurred for his career. He continued to roll home in top class races defeating two of his siblings in his second victory in the Grand Prix De La Province Sud where his jockey used minimal encouragement to win saying after the race he was "cuddly, soft, muscular, and wants to win" Despite plenty of success in 2013 there was just one blemish that year. In his first attempt at trying to defend his title in the Bourail Cup he ended up losing by an excruciating nose to his regular rival Danhil de Pabo. It would be the third and final time Ivor Hill would lose in his career. This defeat would also help give them a boost for his biggest challenge of his career the Coupe Clarke. This was the biggest race in New Caledonia and for Ivor Hill his longest challenge. He had been only a sprinter up until that point and the Coupe Clarke was one mile long. It was an idea Tual was not fully on board with but with some convincing from her mother they tried it. His main rival was going to be the much older New York Magic who had won the Coupe Clarke four times, three of them consecutively from 2008 to 2010 and then once the year before in 2012 he was also Local horse of the year over Ivor Hill in 2012. Ivor Hill did all his best running on the front so his jockey Pravesh Horil was simply told to send him to the lead and get the horse to relax so he had enough energy to go the whole mile. The race went off without a hitch as he denied New York Magic his fifth Coupe Clarke and started his trek towards racing immortality in New Caledonia.

Between 2014 and 2015 he was able to win a total of 13 races with varying degrees of difficulty. When he won his third Grand Prix De La Province Sud in 2014 he defeated his old rivals L'Nominoe, and Captiva du Cap by over 10 lengths. He squared off against the one horse who defeated him in the previous year's Bourail Cup Danhil de Pabo. His younger brother L'Nominoe and Spectaline both took turns pressing him on the lead but by the final quarter with a final burst of speed he powered away in record time. Smashing Spectaline's original track record of 1:24.20 with a new time of 1:22.76. Records and repeat victories continued to pile up for Ivor Hill as he won his second Coupe Clark and etching closer to joining the likes of other racing greats before him. Although 2015 was the fewest times he had run since he was three years old in those six victories included another track record in his fourth consecutive Grand Prix De La Province Sud. But his biggest and most dramatic win came in his third and final run in the Coupe Clarke. Some described his first two victories as him being a long sprinter who stole the race in the first half with his early speed but this time around it was pushed to its limit as Reia de Tamoa a longer distance horse flew after the tiring Ivor Hill. Ivor Hill miraculously held on by a head but Reia de Tamoa's had described their horse as preferring longer distances only a few jumps after the wire Reia de Tamoa passed Ivor Hill. Ivor Hill now joined an elite group of New Caledonia horses who had won three or more Coupe Clarke's Turenne, Balto, Hanoo and New York Magic. After this win Tual decided it would be his final time participating in the Coupe Clarke and that they would focus on sprint distances as it was more to his liking and he had nothing left to prove in that particular race in her eyes.

== Retirement ==
He would race another two years after his hattrick in the Coupe Clarke. He continued his streak until he finally retired in 2017. With his fifth win in the Bourail Cup and then the Grand Prix De La Province Sud to be his final races. The Grand Prix De La Province Sud was the last race he ever ran and the only time he ran when he was officially ten years old. From 2014 to 2017 he had not lost a single time winning his last 24 races of his career consecutively while setting track records from 975 meters to 1400 meters. It was easily the greatest win streak in New Caledonia and one of the greatest winning streaks in Oceania and of all time only being bettered by Oceanic horses Black Cavier, and Winx. As well as Puerto Rican stars like Camarero. Even in comparison to other New Caledonian champions like New York Magic and Balto who both won the Coupe Clarke more times with Balto winning it seven times consecutively Ivor Hill is still generally regarded as the best horse of them all. Charles Brinon kept the horse for the remainder of his life until he suffered from a sudden bout of colic and had to be euthanised on April 12, 2021, when he was 13 years old. A year after his passing he would be honoured with his own stakes race Grand Prix Ivor Hill.
