= Gran Premio de Madrid =

International horse race in Spain

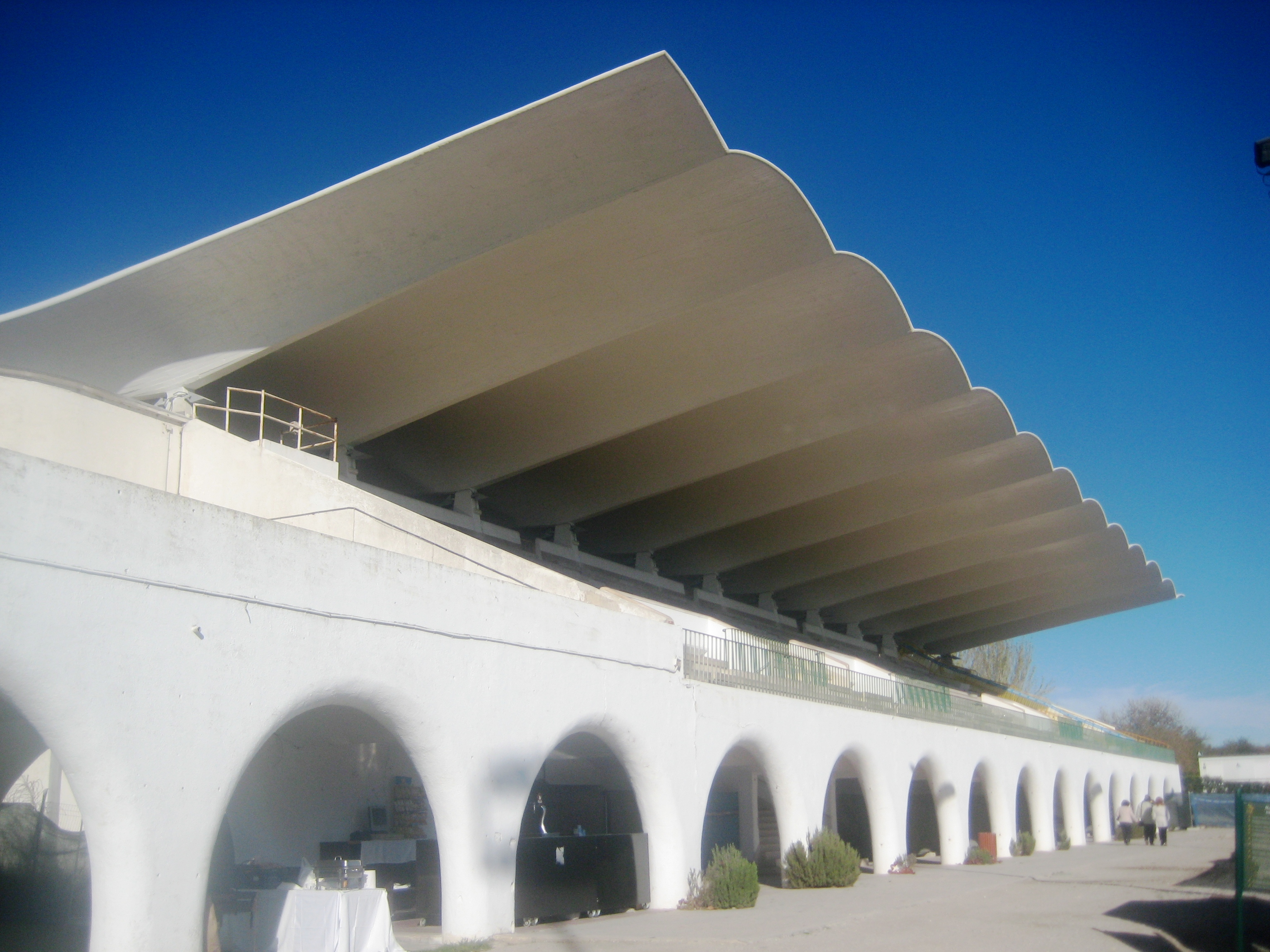
La Zarzuela

The Gran Premio de Madrid is an international horse race which is held in the Hipódromo de la Zarzuela racetrack . The race is designated for colts and fillies three years and older. It is a 2,500-metre race.

== History ==
An earlier Gran Premio de Madrid, for 3 year olds over 2500 meters, was instituted in 1881 at the Hipódromo de la Castellana in Madrid. It was first called the Gran Premio de Madrid, changed to the Gran Premio Nacional, and then La Copa de su Majesdad el Rey. The modern-day Gran Premio de Madrid is considered to have been instituted in 1919, first held at Casa Real el Hipódromo de Aranjuez/Legamarejo; it was opened to older horses, and intended as an international race. It was moved to the Hipódromo de la Castellana until that racecourse closed in 1933. In 1933 it returned to its original venue at Aranjuez, and in 1934-35 was run at San Sebastián. In 1941 it was moved to the new Hipódromo de la Zarzuela. La Zarzuela went bankrupt in 1994, and the race was not held until new management re-opened the course in 2006. In 2006, after a 13-year hiatus, a 2,400-metre Gran Premio de Madrid was run, and the new weight conditions were 59.5 kilograms for 4 years and older and 52 kilograms for 3 years of age.

Distances:

- 1919–1921: 1-9/16 miles (2500 meters, 12.5 furlongs)
- 1922–1923: 1-1/2 miles (2400 meters, 12 furlongs)
- 1924–1993: 1-9/16 miles (2500 meters, 12.5 furlongs)
- 2006–2008: 1-1/2 miles (2400 meters, 12 furlongs)
- 2009–present: 1-9/16 miles (2500 meters, 12.5 furlongs)

== Race day ==
On the last Sunday in June.

== History ==
The winner of the first edition of the Gran premio de Madrid, in 1919, was the French thoroughbred Nouvel An (son of also French stallion Jacobi.

== Winners ==
Year	Winner	Age	Jockey	Trainer	Owner	Time
1975	Chacal	4	Claudio Carudel	Fulgencio de Diego	Cuadra Rosales	2:39:40
1976	Rheffissimo	3	Francisco Rodríguez	Jesús Méndez	Cuadra Villapadierna	2:37:40
1977	El Señor	3	Cristóbal Medina	Ángel Penna	Cuadra Mendoza	2:36:80
1978	El Señor	4	Román Martín	Ángel Penna	Cuadra Mendoza	2:37:40
1979	Príncipe Duero	4	Paulino García	Francisco Galdeano T.	Cuadra Corellana	2:41:60
1980	El País	3	Román Martín	Julio César Martínez	Cuadra Mendoza	2:40:40
1981	El País	4	Román Martín	Julio César Martínez	Cuadra Mendoza	2:40:20
1982	El País	5	Cristóbal Medina	Julio César Martínez	Cuadra Mendoza	2:44:40
1983	Brezo	4	Claudio Carudel	Claudio Carudel	Cuadra Rosales	2:43:40
1984	Richal	4	Claudio Carudel	Claudio Carudel	Cuadra Rosales	2:42:20
1985	Richal	5	Claudio Carudel	Claudio Carudel	Cuadra Rosales	2:45:20
1986	Casualidad	4	Claudio Carudel	Claudio Carudel	Cuadra Rosales	2:40:00
1987	Casualidad	5	Claudio Carudel	Claudio Carudel	Cuadra Rosales	2:43:60
1988	Vichisky	3	Ceferino Carrasco	Miguel Alonso	Marquess of Santa Cruz de Paniagua	2:42:00
1989	Villa d’Este	5	Cristóbal Medina	José Luis de Salas	Cuadra Machín	2:41:00
1990	Akelarre	3	Alan Munro	José Luis de Salas	Cuadra Lortenia	2:45:15
1991	Monet	3	Jesús A. Machado	Román Martín	Cuadra Alazán	2:36:15
1992	Dariyoun	4	Richard Hills	Criquette Head-Maarek	Cuadra Alborada	2:35:00
1993	King Cobra	4	Paul Gilson	Joanes Osorio	Cuadra Dos Hermanas	2:35:77
2006	Baldoria	3	Jorge Horcajada	Mauricio Delcher S.	Cuadra Madoños	2:32:54
2007	Premier Galop	3	Sylvain Hureau	Christian Delcher S.	Cuadra Zurraquín	2:29:88
2008	Bannaby	5	Julien Grosjean	Mauricio Delcher S.	Cuadra Miranda	2:30:25
2009	Faramir	4	Jorge I. Horcajada	Mauricio Delcher S.	Cuadra Miranda	2:36:27
2010	Karluv Most	4	Jeremy Crocquevieille	Juan Luis Maroto	Cuadra Cholaica	2:37:68
2011	Entre Copas	7	Jeremy Crocquevieille	Joannes Osorio	Cuadra África	2:38:22
2012	Karluv Most	6	Charles Nora	Juan Luis Maroto	Cuadra Cholaica	2:41:98
2013	Entre Copas	9	José Luis Martínez	Joannes Osorio	Cuadra África	2:40:33
2014	Frine	4	Jeremy Crocquevieille	Joannes Osorio	Duke of Alburquerque	2:36:09
2015	No race
2016	Madrileño	4	Václav Janácek	Guillermo Arizkorreta	Cuadra Popular	2:34:39
2017	Tuvalu	5	Oscar Urbina	Juan-Miguel Osorio	Cuadra Santa Barbara	2:36:05
2018	Zascandil	4	Borja Fayos-Martin	Christian Delcher-Sanchez	Cuadra Bloke	2:36:35
2019	Hipodamo De Mileto	5	Clement Cadel	Jose Calderon	Cuadra Nanina	2:38:10
