= Baulking Green =

British racehorse

- Sire: Coup De Myth
- Grandsire: Coup De Lion
- Dam: Nicotine Nelly
- Damsire: Irish Trout
- Sex: Gelding
- Foaled: 1952
- Country: Great Britain
- Colour: Chestnut (coat)
- Owner: Jim Reade
- Trainer: Tim Forster
- Last updated on January 18, 2008

Baulking Green was a chestnut gelding British steeplechaser, sired by Coup de Myth out of Nicotine Nelly by Irish Trout. He was foaled in 1952, and throughout his racing career in the 1960s he was owned by Jim Reade. He was usually ridden by George Small, and after the 1962 season was trained by Tim Forster. He raced in point-to-points and hunter 'chases; to be eligible for these races, he was qualified with the Old Berkshire Hunt. During his career, Baulking Green drew attention to the tiny village of Baulking, Oxfordshire (until 1974 part of Berkshire).

== Career record ==
- 1961 2213 10-3 lb
- 1962 f1f1(disq)111 11-10 lb 3rd top-rated hunter chaser
- 1964 b11112 11-13 lb 2nd top-rated hunter chaser
- 1965 1111 12-2 lb champion hunter chaser
- 1966 1u111 12-0 lb champion hunter chaser
- 1967 11f1f 12-0 lb joint champion hunter chaser
- 1968 2 11-7 lb 6th top-rated hunter chaser
- 1969 7 11-1st

Geoffrey Sale (from whose annual publication Hunter Chasers & Point-to-Pointer the above is taken) wrote in the 1968 annual that Baulking Green was “just about the most gallant animal that ever looked through a bridle”. Sale wrote of Baulking Green's last race: “Broke down behind What A Myth at Newbury (on three legs from two out but would not be pulled up). The most courageous of horses. Will long be remembered”. Ron Liddiard wrote a biography of the horse (Baulking Green: Champion Hunter Chaser in 1971. Introduction by John Lawrence, Made & Printed in Great Britain by The Abbey Press, Stert Street, Abingdon, Berks & published by J A Allen & Co Ltd 1 Lower Grosvenor Place London SW1 - SBN 85 131170-9 originally sold for £1.50)

== See also ==
- Fox hunting
- Point-to-point (steeplechase)
- Steeplechase
