= Hippodrome Waregem =

Horse racing venue in Waregem, Belgium

Coordinates: 50.885°N 3.442°E

- Interactive map of Hippodrome Waregem
- Location: Waregem, Belgium
- Capacity: 40,000 for horse racing

Tenant
- Great Flanders Steeple Chase

Hippodrome Waregem (Dutch: Hippodroom van Waregem), located in Waregem, Belgium, is used for horse racing. It hosts the annual Great Flanders Steeple Chase, a steeplechase event. It has a capacity of 40,000 spectators.
