= Waregem =

Waregem Woaregem (West Flemish)
- City and municipality
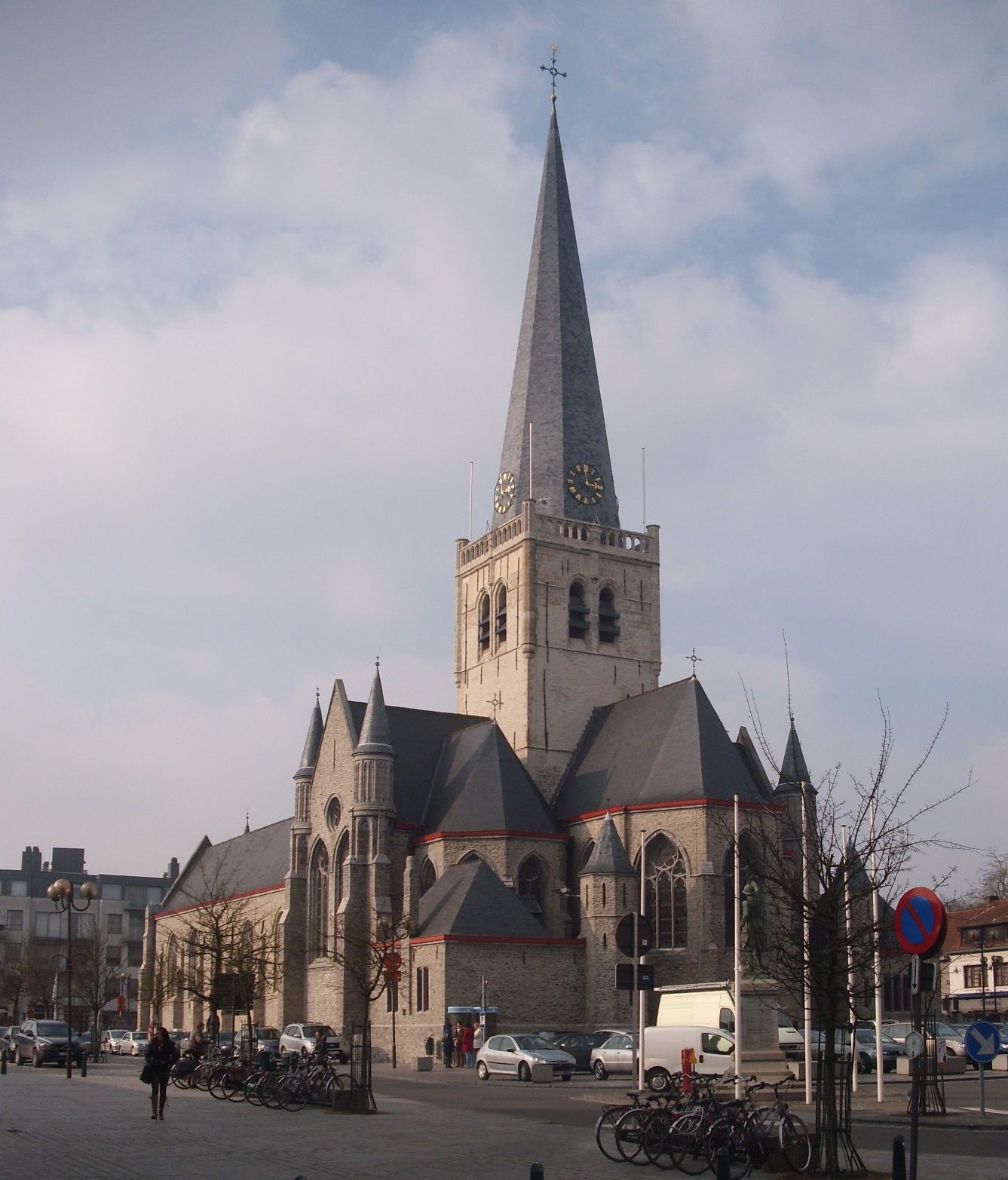
- City parish church located on the marketplace

- Flag Coat of arms

- Location of Waregem in West-Flanders
- Interactive map of Waregem
- Location in Belgium
- Coordinates: 50°53′N 03°25′E
- Country: Belgium
- Community: Flemish Community
- Region: Flemish Region
- Province: West Flanders
- Arrondissement: Kortrijk

Government
  - Mayor: Kristof Chanterie
  - Governing party: CD&V

Area
  - Total: 44.5 km^{2} (17.2 sq mi)

Population (2020-01-01)
  - Total: 38,347
  - Density: 862/km^{2} (2,230/sq mi)
- Postal codes: 8790-8793
- NIS code: 34040
- Area codes: 056
- Website: www.waregem.be

Waregem (Dutch: [ˈʋaːrəɣɛm]; West Flemish: Woaregem [ˈβɒːrəɦæm]), spelled Waereghem before, is a municipality and city located in the Belgian province of West Flanders. The municipality lies in the valley of the river Lys, between Kortrijk and Ghent. It is part of the administrative district of Kortrijk and comprises the towns of Beveren, Desselgem, Sint-Eloois-Vijve and Waregem proper. On January 1, 2024, Waregem had a total population of 39,970. The total area is 44.34 km² which gives a population density of 901 inhabitants per km².

== History ==
=== Origins ===
The first inhabitants of this forested region settled along the Leie well before Roman times. Bronze coins and artifacts associated with the Gallo-Roman culture show extensive activity in this area in the first centuries of our era. This is not surprising given the fact that Sint-Eloois-Vijve stood at the intersection of two important Roman roads: Cassel-Tongeren and Bavai-Oudenburg. The name of the current municipality refers to a certain “Waro” clan or tribe, possibly dating from the Frankish period.

=== Middle Ages ===
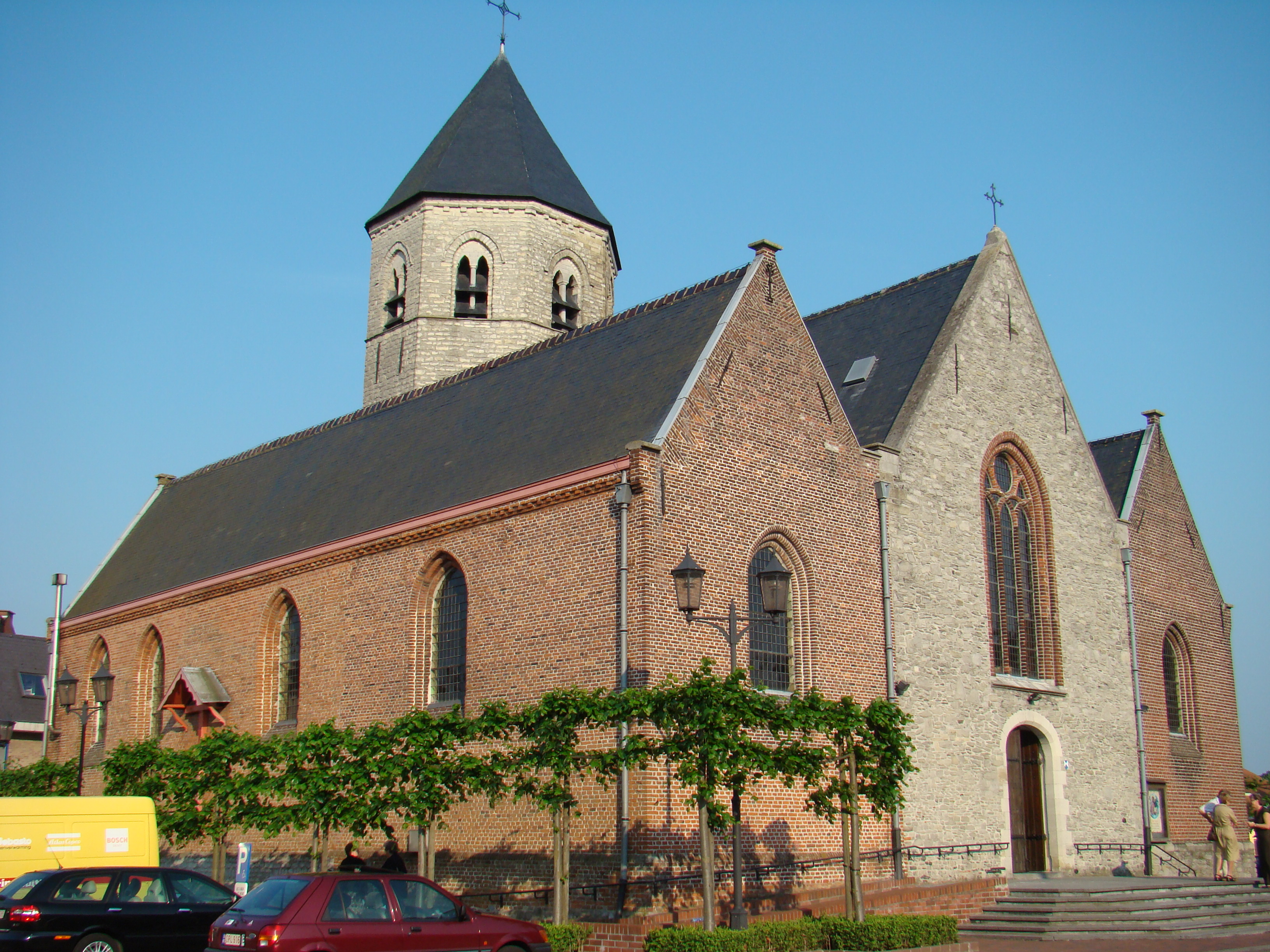
St-Eloois-Vijve Church

In the 10th century, most of Waregem's territory was given as a grant to the St Peter Abbey in Ghent. The local administrative center used by the Benedictines along the Leie River can still be seen today and is still known as the Munkenhof. At the end of the century, Baldwin IV, Count of Flanders, made this area the base from which he could advance against Kortrijk. During the following centuries, the medieval feudal system allowed the land to be progressively parceled out to landowners from places as far as Dendermonde and Tournai. At that time, like in the rest of Flanders, most of the population consisted of farmers, spinners and weavers. Tax documents from the 13th century attest to the strong economic activity of the time. Waregem's attempt in 1635 at obtaining rights to hold its own market was opposed by the neighbouring towns. A Saturday market was finally approved by Joseph II of Austria in 1784.

=== From the 18th century until today ===
Much of the medieval land ownership structure remained unchanged until the end of the 18th century, when the town counted some 4,500 inhabitants. The construction of the main roadway between Kortrijk and Ghent made possible the building of an important coaching inn on the territory of Waregem, where horses could be hired. The French Revolution brought severe religious restrictions in its wake; it also gave the region a modern administrative system and more political autonomy. During the 19th century, the old textile economy went into decline. The proximity of the Leie River, however, was a boon for Waregem, as its flax industry drove the local economy until well into the 20th century. Waregem earned its official city title on January 1, 2000.

== Main sights ==
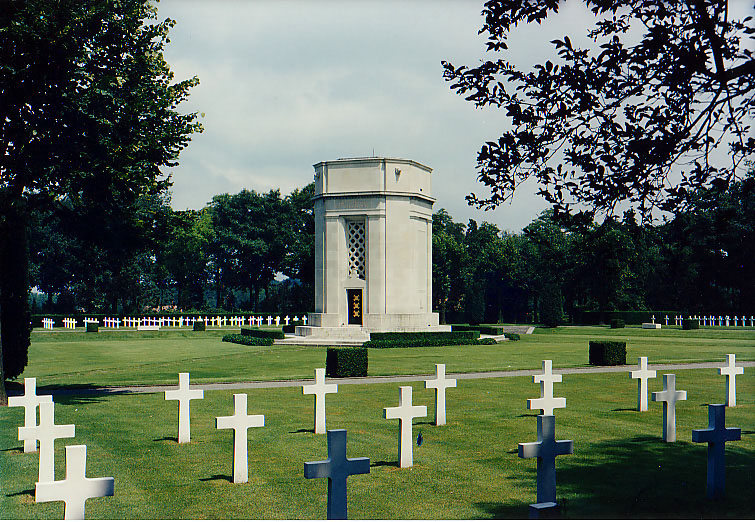
Flanders Field American Cemetery and Memorial

- The Flanders Field American Cemetery and Memorial is the smallest World War I American cemetery in Europe and the only one in Belgium. It is located on the southeast edge of town and is the burial place for 368 American military who died during the liberation of Belgium in World War I. The chapel is inscribed with the names of 43 Missing in Action whose remains were never recovered or identified.
- The Gaverbeekhippodroom is one of the few hippodromes in Belgium.

== Sports and events ==
- Waregem is well known for its annual horse races at the local hippodrome, including the Great Flanders Steeple Chase, which takes place the first Tuesday after the last Sunday of August. In the local language this week-long event, dating from 1847, is known as the Waregem Koerse.
- Waregem is notable in the UK for a prominent position in the song; "Ordinary to Enschede" by Half Man Half Biscuit.
- Waregem is the hometown of former football team K.S.V. Waregem and present team S.V. Zulte-Waregem.
- The town is the finish of the classic Dwars door Vlaanderen (English: Across Flanders) road bicycle race. It also was the departure of the third stage of the 2007 Tour de France, going from Waregem to Compiègne.
- The Cyclocross Masters, the final round of the cyclo-cross season, has been hosted by Waregem since 2013.
- Waregem is home to rugbyclub Waereghem.

== Famous inhabitants ==
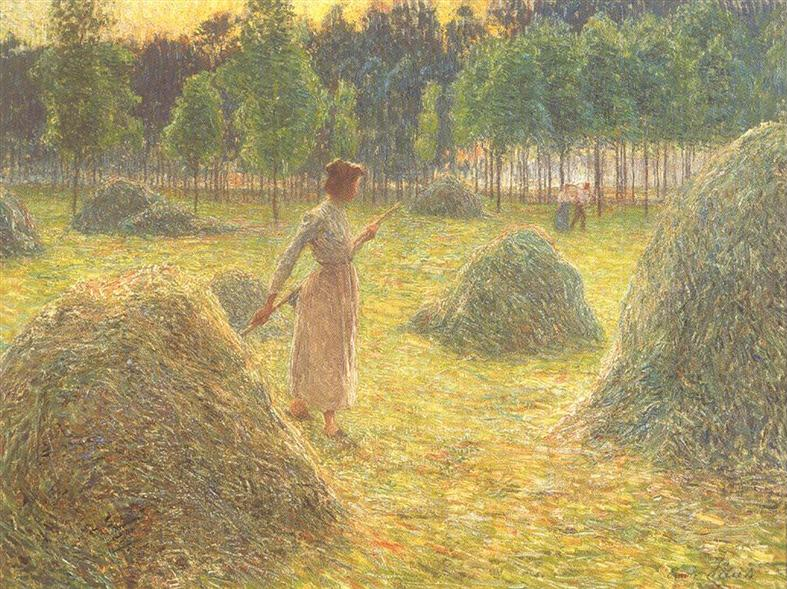
Haystacks by Emile Claus

- Aborted, Death Metal band (b. 1995)
- Nastja Claessens, player for the WNBA and Belgium national basketball team (b. 2004)
- Emile Claus, painter (1849–1924)
- Ann Demeulemeester, fashion designer (b. 1959)
- Erik Derycke, politician, lawyer, and former minister (b. 1949)
- Dick Norman, tennis player (b. 1971)
- Jan Pieter Schotte, cardinal and official of the Roman Curia (1928–2005)
- Franky Vandendriessche, football goalkeeper (b. 1971)
- Peter Vermeersch, composer, clarinet player, and producer (b. 1959)
- Marc Waelkens, professor of archaeology (b. 1948)
- Koen Versyp, football attacker (b. 1981)

== Twin towns and sister cities ==
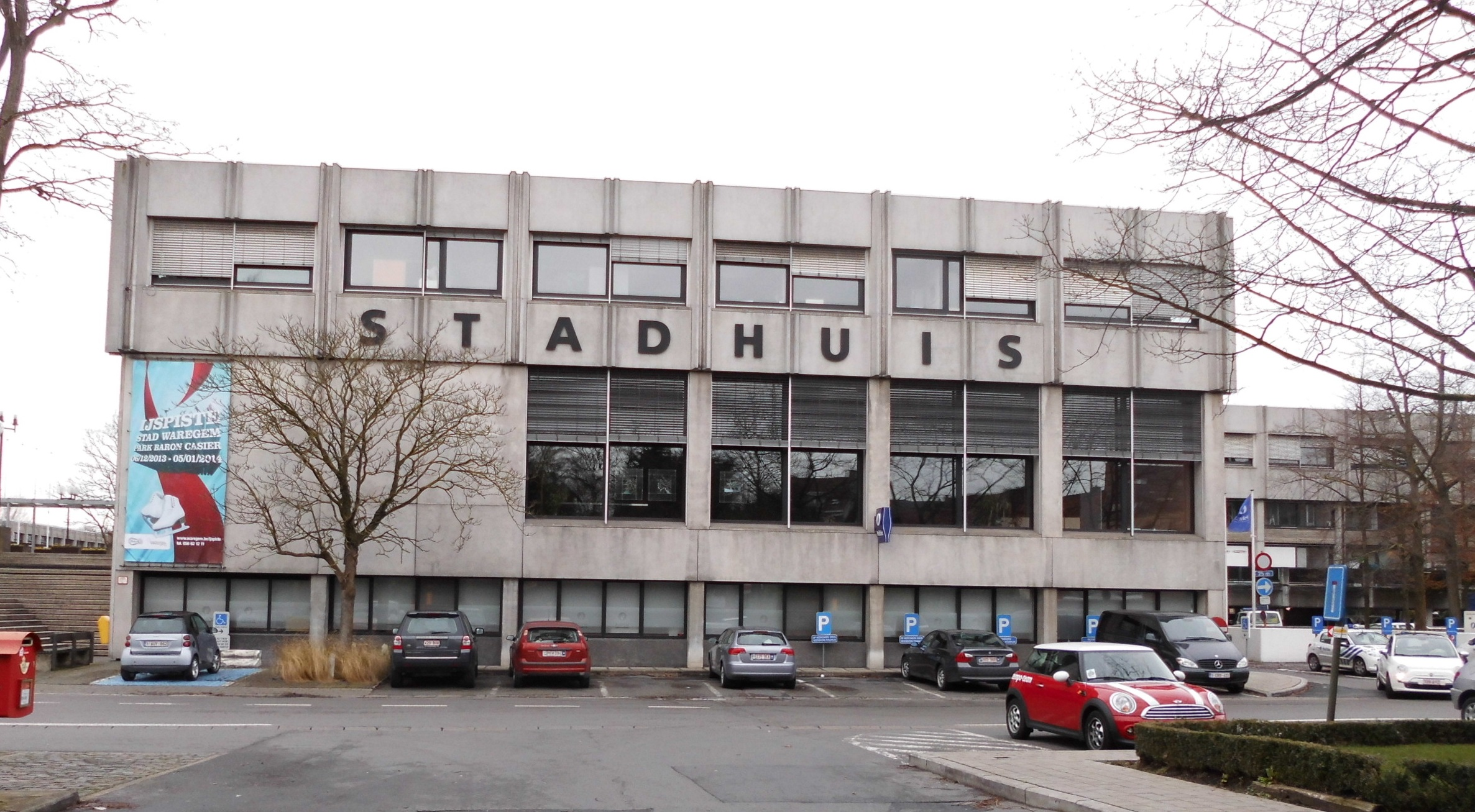
Waregem City Hall

- Ngarama, Rwanda
- Szekszárd, Hungary

=== Euro Equus ===
- Jerez, Spain
- Pardubice, Czech Republic
- Golegã, Portugal
- Wrocław, Poland (since 2015)
