= Pferderennplatz Meran =

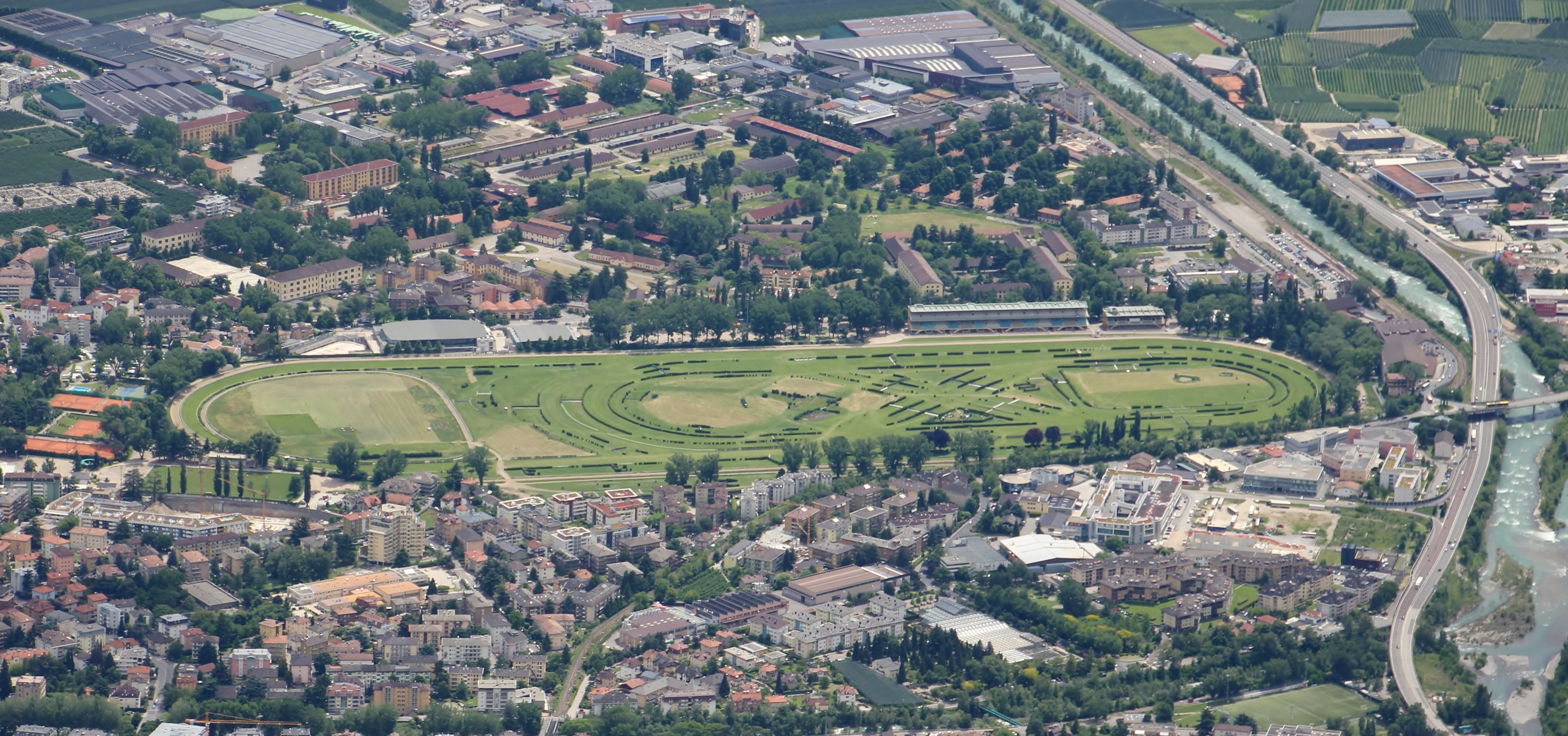
The Pferderennplatz Meran

The Pferderennplatz Meran (Italian: Ippodromo di Maia) is an Italian racecourse, located in the town of Meran, South Tyrol, used for thoroughbred horse racing. It is one of the leading racecourses in Italy, hosting the annual Grosser Preis von Meran (Grand Prix of Meran).

As Meran grew in importance as a spa town due to the visits by Empress Elisabeth of Austria and the aristocracy, the need to have organised horse races grew. In 1896, the first horse race took place and in 1900 a permanent racecourse established, which featured flat, steeplechase, and trotting races.

Following the annexation of the town from Austria-Hungary to Italy after the end of World War I, the new fascist government constructed a new site in 1935. Paolo Vietti-Violi was the architect. The Grosser Preis von Meran was funded with the lottery and endowed with the highest prize money of the state lotteries. The event is one of the most important horse races is in the country and has produced many memorable wins.
