= Zawawi Mosque =

Mosque located in Muscat, Oman

- مَسْجِد عَبْد ٱلْمُنْعِم ٱلزَّوَاوِي
- The mosque in 2025

- Location of the mosque in Oman

Religion
- Affiliation: Sunni Islam
- Ecclesiastical or organizational status: Mosque
- Status: Active

Location
- Location: Muscat
- Country: Oman
- Interactive map of Zawawi Mosque
- Coordinates: 23°35′46″N 58°25′20″E

Architecture
- Founder: Omar Zawawi (Al Zawawi dynasty)
- Completed: 1985

Specifications
- Dome: One
- Minaret: One

The Zawawi Mosque (Arabic: مَسْجِد عَبْدُ ٱلْمُنْعِم ٱلزَّوَاوِي, romanized: Masjid ʿAbdul-Munʿim Az-Zawāwī) is a Sunni mosque, located in Muscat, Oman.

It was built by Omar Zawawi, a member of the Al Zawawi family, to commemorate the death of his father Abdul-Mun'im Al-Zawawi, and opened in 1985. It is notable for having the entirety of the Qur'an engraved on metal plates on its walls. There was also an older mosque by that name, built in 1906 and demolished in 2005.

== See also ==
- Islam in Oman
- List of mosques in Oman
- Qais Bin Abdul Munim Al Zawawi
