= Qais Bin Abdul Munim Al Zawawi =

Omani politician (1935–1995)

Qais bin Abdul-Munim al-Zawawi
- قيس بن عبد المنعم الزواوي
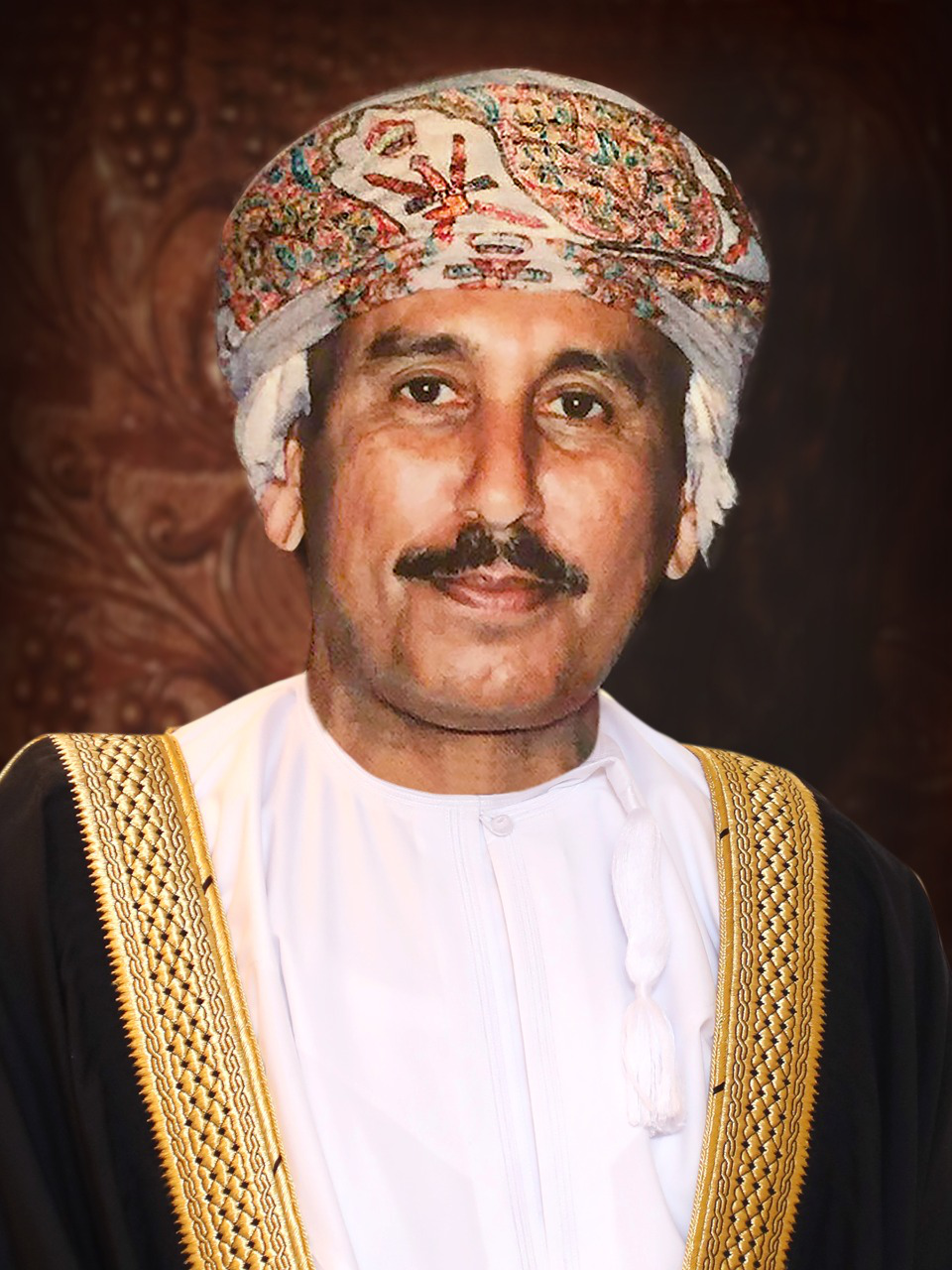
- Al Zawawi c. 1995

Minister Responsible for Foreign Affairs
- In office 1982 – 11 September 1995
- Monarch: Qaboos bin Said
- Prime Minister: Qaboos bin Said
- Preceded by: Fahd bin Mahmoud al Said
- Succeeded by: Yusuf bin Alawi

Deputy Prime Minister for Economic and Financial Affairs
- In office 1982 – 11 September 1995
- Monarch: Qaboos bin Said
- Prime Minister: Qaboos bin Said

Personal details
- Born: August 27, 1935 Salalah, Muscat and Oman
- Died: 11 September 1995 (aged 60) Salalah, Oman

Qais bin Abdul Munim Al Zawawi (Arabic: قيس بن عبد المنعم الزواوي; 27 August 1935 – 11 September 1995) was an Omani politician and businessman who served as the second Minister Responsible for Foreign Affairs (Note: Ministers in Responsibility" were previously appointed as the Sultan was intended to hold the official position of "Minister of Foreign Affairs" himself) of Oman, and later served as Deputy Prime Minister for Economic and Financial Affairs under Sultan Qaboos bin Said from 1982 until he got into a car crash with Qaboos, resulting in his death.

== Early life ==
Before entering politics, Al Zawawi studied in India. He then moved to Dubai, where he established Pepsi-Cola operations with Sheikh Rashid bin Saeed Al Maktoum, then ruler of Dubai (1958–1990), and Sultan bin Ali Al Owais and Mohamed Yehia Zakaria, both prominent businessmen. He then returned to Oman after the discovery of oil in 1967 and the deposition of the Sultan's father in a bloodless coup, both of which enabled the country to start to move again commercially.

== Enterprise ==
Qais Al Zawawi was the founder of Alawi Enterprises, a holding company for the Zawawi Group.

== See also ==
- Zawawi Mosque
