= Zawawi Cup =

Flat horse race in Sweden

- Class: Listed
- Location: Jägersro Racecourse; Jägersro, Sweden
- Race type: Flat / Thoroughbred
- Sponsor: Dr Omar Zawawi
- Website: Jägersro

Race information
- Distance: 1,200 metres (6f)
- Surface: Dirt
- Track: Left-handed
- Qualification: Three-years-old and up
- Weight: 58 kg (3yo); 60 kg (4yo+); Allowances; 1 1/2 kg for fillies and mares
- Purse: 1,000,000 kr (2016); 1st: 600,000 kr

The Zawawi Cup is a Listed flat horse race in Sweden open to thoroughbreds aged three years or older. It is run over a distance of 1,200 metres (about 6 furlongs) at Jägersro in July. It is one of the few Group or Listed races in Europe to be run on a dirt surface.

== History ==
The event is sponsored by Dr Omar Zawawi, a leading racehorse owner in Scandinavia. It was formerly known as the Zawawi Baltic Cup.

For a period the race held Listed status. It was promoted to Group 3 level in 2013 and downgraded back to Listed status in 2019.

Prior to 2014 the Zawawi Cup was run in August, usually on the same day as the Svenskt Derby.

== Records ==
Most successful horse (4 wins):

- Sharp Matt – 1995, 1996, 1997, 1998

Leading jockey (5 wins):

- Janos Tandari – Boobe Grand (1980, 1981), Miami Flyer (1986), Simon Sacc (1990), Glenlivet (1992)

Leading trainer (5 wins):

- Einar Jardby – Cocktail Queen (1958, 1960), Prinsen (1962), Carneval (1963), Super Scot (1972)

== Winners since 1977 ==
| Year | Winner | Age | Jockey | Trainer | Time |
|---|---|---|---|---|---|
| 1977 | Desert Way | | Rae Guest | Stig Gademan |
| 1978 | Boobe Grand | 3 | Walter Buick | Terje Dahl |
| 1979 | Our Primrose | | Brian Wilson | Lars Swärd |
| 1980 | Boobe Grand | 5 | Janos Tandari | Terje Dahl |
| 1981 | Boobe Grand | 6 | Janos Tandari | Terje Dahl |
| 1982 | Hjovial | 2 | Sofia Nordgren | Mai Adielsson |
| 1983 | Glenfiddich | 4 | Sofia Nordgren | Mai Adielsson |
| 1984 | Hjovial | 4 | Ken Stott | Hans Adielsson |
| 1985 | Sobine | 4 | Gunilla Nilsson | Hans Adielsson |
| 1986 | Miami Flyer | 3 | Janos Tandari | Terje Dahl |
| 1987 | Rutger Hermes | 5 | George Dickie | Kristina Lokrantz |
| 1988 | Green's Picture | 4 | Ole Larsen | Börje Olsson |
| 1989 | D'Artigny | | Jenny Möller | Caroline Strömberg |
| 1990 | Simon Sacc | 8 | Janos Tandari | Arnfinn Lund |
| 1991 | Itsabrahma | 5 | Gunnar Nordling | Ewy Nordling |
| 1992 | Glenlivet | 4 | Janos Tandari | Björn Björkman |
| 1993 | Never So Sure | 5 | Fernando Diaz | Arnfinn Lund |
| 1994 | Informant | 4 | Fredrik Johansson | Søren Jensen |
| 1995 | Sharp Matt | 4 | Fernando Diaz | Michael Kahn |
| 1996 | Sharp Matt | 5 | Kim Andersen | Michael Kahn | 1:12.20 |
| 1997 | Sharp Matt | 6 | Kim Andersen | Michael Kahn |
| 1998 | Sharp Matt | 7 | Kim Andersen | Michael Kahn |
| 1999 | State of Caution | 6 | Fernando Diaz | Claes Björling | 1:12.60 |
| 2000 | Rolo Tomasi | 4 | Manuel Santos | Wido Neuroth | 1:12.10 |
| 2001 | Waquaas | 5 | Gunnar Nordling | Ewy Nordling | 1:12.90 |
| 2002 | Nobel Prize | 6 | Rodrigo Blanco | Diego Lowther | 1:12.20 |
| 2003 | Waquaas (Note: Aramus finished first in 2003, but he was subsequently disqualified after testing positive for a banned substance) | 7 | Fredrik Johansson | Roy Arne Kvisla | 1:11.90 |
| 2004 | Pipoldchap | 4 | Manuel Santos | Francisco Castro | 1:11.90 |
| 2005 | Pipoldchap | 5 | Manuel Martinez | Francisco Castro | 1:12.30 |
| 2006 | Pipoldchap | 6 | Manuel Martinez | Francisco Castro | 1:12.20 |
| 2007 | Maxim's | 6 | Manuel Santos | Lennart Reuterskiöld, Jr. | 1:11.60 |
| 2008 | Fujisan | 4 | Yvonne Durant | Yvonne Durant | 1:12.60 |
| 2009 | Tertio Bloom | 4 | Fredrik Johansson | Fredrik Reuterskiöld | 1:12.00 |
| 2010 | Alcohuaz | 5 | Per-Anders Gråberg | Lennart Reuterskiöld, Jr. | 1:12.80 |
| 2011 | Verde Mar | 4 | Valmir de Azeredo | Fabricio Borges | 1:10.40 |
| 2012 | Verde Mar | 5 | João Moreira | Fabricio Borges | 1:11.50 |
| 2013 | Verde Mar | 6 | Valmir de Azeredo | Fabricio Borges | 1:11.60 |
| 2014 | Let'sgoforit | 6 | Oliver Wilson | Bodil Hallencreutz | 1:10.10 |
| 2015 | Let'sgoforit | 7 | Oliver Wilson | Bodil Hallencreutz | 1:12.90 |
| 2016 | Giftorm | 6 | Kevin Stott | Fredrik Reuterskiold | 1:11.38 |
| 2017 | Land's End | 5 | Alexandre Dos Santos | Francisco Castro | 1:11.90 |
| 2018 | I Kirk | 4 | Carlos Lopez | Susanne Berneklint | 1:10.60 |
| 2019 | I Kirk | 5 | Oliver Wilson | Susanne Berneklint | 1:11.80 |
| 2020 | I Kirk | 5 | Oliver Wilson | Susanne Berneklint | 1:11.40 |
| 2021 | Nocentsinkentucky | 4 | Valmir de Azeredo | Fredrik Reuterskiold | 1:11.50 |
| 2022 | Irish Action | 4 | Jacob Johansen | Lennart Reuterskiöld, Jr. | 1:11.90 |
| 2024 | Twirling Ghost | 4 | Per-Anders Gråberg | Roy Arne Kvisla | 1:09.00 |
| 2025 | Aurinko | 4 | Per-Anders Gråberg | Roy Arne Kvisla | 1:10.40 |
| 2026 | Lamborghini Bf | 5 | Elione Chaves | Fredrik Reuterskiöld | 1:11.00 |

== Earlier winners ==
- 1941: Sidenhuset II
- 1942: Maclean
- 1943: Marschal
- 1944: Magdalena
- 1945: Ayah
- 1946: Lamara
- 1947: Capriole
- 1948: Dandle
- 1949: Safari
- 1950: Faithful
- 1951: Flying Fire
- 1952: Bolero
- 1953: Irmina
- 1954: Norman
- 1955: Mercurius
- 1956: Mercurius
- 1957: Melchior
- 1958: Cocktail Queen
- 1959: Donoak
- 1960: Cocktail Queen
- 1961: Palladium
- 1962: Prinsen
- 1963: Carneval
- 1964: Salerno
- 1965: Fair Lot
- 1966: Roman Wedding
- 1967: Rebell Fortuna
- 1968: Rebell Fortuna
- 1969: Prior
- 1970: Prior
- 1971: Komarov
- 1972: Super Scot
- 1973: Chene
- 1974: Super Scot
- 1975: Super Scot
- 1976: Kangetu

== See also ==
- List of Scandinavian flat horse races
