= Gran Premio Merano =

Italian annual horse racing event

The Gran Premio Merano (German: Großer Preis von Meran) is an annual horse racing event which takes place in September in Pferderennplatz Meran, Meran/Merano, Italy. First run in 1935, it quickly became Italy's most prestigious and valuable steeplechase and the attendance is roughly 13,000 People. The race, 5,000 meters long, includes twenty-four obstacles and is run over a twisting, figure-of-eight course. The purse in 2018 was € 250.000.

== Winners since 2000 ==
Year	Winner	Jockey
2022	L'Estran	Josef Bartos
2021	L'Estran	Josef Bartos
2020	L'Estran	Josef Bartos
2019	L'Estran	Josef Bartos
2018	Le Costaud	James Reveley
2017	Al Bustan	Jan Faltejsek
2016	Mazhilis	Jan Kratochvil
2015	Kazzio	Cevin Chan
2014	Alpha Two	Josef Vana Jr
2013	Alpha Two	Josef Vana Jr
2012	Rigoureux	Jacques Ricou
2011	Chercheur d'Or	James Reveley
2010	Rigoureux	James Reveley
2009	Sharstar	Raffaele Romano
2008	Sharstar	Raffaele Romano
2007	Halling Joy	Raffaele Romano
2006	Kolorado	Dirk Fuhrmann
2005	Rosenbrief	Thierry Steeger
2004	Masini	Jim Crowley
2003	Tempo d'Or	Benoît Gicquel
2002	Present bleu	Benoît Delo
2001	Scaligero	Dirk Fuhrmann
2000	Grey Jack	Christophe Pieux

== Records ==
- 1st winner: Roi de Trèfle
- Most victories for a horse: 3 (Or Jack)
- Most victories for a jockey: 4 (Christophe Pieux)
