= Prix Chaudenay =

Flat horse race in France

- Class: Group 2
- Location: Longchamp Racecourse; Paris, France
- Inaugurated: 1875
- Race type: Flat / Thoroughbred
- Sponsor: Qatar
- Website: france-galop.com

Race information
- Distance: 3,000 metres (1 7/8 miles)
- Surface: Turf
- Track: Right-handed
- Qualification: Three-year-olds
- Weight: 58 kg Allowances; 1 1/2 kg for fillies
- Purse: €200,000 (2021); 1st: €114,000

Prix Chaudenay
2025
Tennessee Stud	Emit	Surabad

Previous years
2024
Illinois	Trafalgar Square	Strassia
2023
Double Major	Harbour Wind	Shembala
2022
Al Qareem	Sober	Duke De Sessa
2021
Manobo	Kemari	Tides Of War

2020-2011
2020
Valia	Nemean Lion	Step By Step
2019
Technician	Moonlight Spirit	Iskanderhon
2018
Brundtland	Lillian Russell	My Swashbuckler
2017
Ice Breeze	Call To Mind	Darbuzan
2016
Doha Dream	Moonshiner	Marmelo
2015
Vazirabad	Tiberian	Pilansberg
2014
Auvray	Vent De Force	Baino Hope
2013
Valirann	Montclair	Lucky Look
2012
Canticum	Les Beaufs	Tenenbaum
2011
Shankardeh	Miss Lago	Pacifique

2010-2001
2010
Celtic Celeb	Ivory Land	Le Larron
2009
Manighar	Los Cristianos	Aizavoski
2008
Watar	Shemima	Centennial
2007
Coastal Path	Noble Prince	Royal And Regal
2006
Vendangeur	Ponte Tresa	Getaway
2005
Shamdala	Fraloga	Without A Trace
2004
Reefscape	Lord Du Sud	Percussionist
2003
Behkara	Risk Seeker	Clear Thinking
2002
Morozov	Windermere	Swing Wing
2001
Wareed	Capal Garmon	Pushkin

2000-1991
2000
Epitre	Riddlesdown	Rostropovich
1999
Amilynx	Northerntown	Lord Brex
1998
Pozarica	Ocean Of Storms	Kahtan
1997
Vertical Speed	Book At Bedtime	New Frontier
1996
Tarator	Irish Woman	Cachet Noir
1995
Affidavit	Peckinpah's Soul	Anchor Clever
1994
Northern Spur	Bayrika	Party Season
1993
Epaphos	Infrasonic	Karmousil
1992
Dajraan	In Quarto	Djais
1991
Justice	Farisi	Anthequo

1990-1989
1990
Comte Du Bourg	Ozal	Trick Tern
1989
Turgeon	Sharnfold	Noble Savage

The Prix Chaudenay is a Group 2 flat horse race in France open to three-year-old thoroughbreds. It is run at Longchamp over a distance of 3,000 metres (about 1 7/8 miles), and it is scheduled to take place each year in late September or early October.

== History ==
The event was established in 1875, and it was originally called the Prix de l'Espérance. It took place in spring, and served as a trial for the Grand Prix de Paris.

The Prix de l'Espérance was abandoned throughout World War I, with no running from 1915 to 1918. During World War II, it was contested at Maisons-Laffitte in 1943, and Le Tremblay in 1944 and 1945.

The present system of race grading was introduced in 1971, and the Prix de l'Espérance was initially classed at Group 3 level. It was promoted to Group 2 status in 1987, and from this point it was staged in late June or early July.

The race was renamed in memory of Hubert de Chaudenay (1903–1989), a former president of the Société d'Encouragement, in 1990. Hubert's father Jean had been similarly honoured by the naming of the Prix Jean de Chaudenay.

The Prix Hubert de Chaudenay was run at Maisons-Laffitte in 1997 and 1998. It returned to Longchamp and was moved to the Saturday of Prix de l'Arc de Triomphe weekend in 1999. The latter race is traditionally held on the first Sunday of October.

The title of the race was shortened to Prix Chaudenay in 2004, when the Prix Jean de Chaudenay was discontinued. It now honours both father and son, Jean and Hubert de Chaudenay.

== Records ==
Leading jockey (4 wins):

- Charles Semblat – Badari (1926), Passaro (1929), Raeburn (1931), Foxhound (1939)
- Roger Poincelet – Suez (1949), Altipan (1957), Sempervivum (1961), Parabellum (1966)
- Maxime Garcia – Malar (1955), Vattel (1956), Tello (1958), Chrysler (1960)
- Yves Saint-Martin – Waldmeister (1964), Cheik (1965), Largny (1970), Chawn (1975)
- Alain Lequeux – Chem (1982), Rutheford (1983), Rivlia (1985), Tabayaan (1987)
- Thierry Jarnet – Justice (1991), Dajraan (1992), Northern Spur (1994), Affidavit (1995)
- Olivier Peslier – Tarator (1996), Vertical Speed (1997), Amilynx (1999), Epitre (2000)
- Christophe Soumillon – Behkara (2003), Shamdala (2005), Valirann (2013), Vazirabad (2015)

Leading trainer (12 wins):

- André Fabre – Rutheford (1983), Justice (1991), Dajraan (1992), Northern Spur (1994), Affidavit (1995), Vertical Speed (1997), Amilynx (1999), Epitre (2000), Morozov (2002), Reefscape (2004), Coastal Path (2007), Doha Dream (2016)

Leading owner (5 wins):

- Édouard de Rothschild – Predicateur (1912), Mont Blanc (1922), Camping (1933), Bokbul (1935), Ginko Biloba (1937)
- HH Aga Khan IV – Tabayaan (1987), Behkara (2003), Shamdala (2005), Manighar (2009), Shankardeh (2011)

== Winners since 1980 ==
Year	Winner	Jockey	Trainer	Owner	Time
1980	Chicbury	Georges Doleuze	Charlie Milbank	A. D. S. Mangnall	3:24.90
1981	Tipperary Fixer	Maurice Philipperon	John Fellows	Ben Arbib	3:22.30
1982	Chem	Alain Lequeux	Olivier Douieb	Charles St George	3:14.90
1983	Rutheford	Alain Lequeux	André Fabre	Franz de Schepper	3:21.90
1984	Mont Basile	Gérard Dubroeucq	Gérard Collet	Ecurie Formule 1	3:26.10
1985	Rivlia	Alain Lequeux	Maurice Zilber	Nelson Bunker Hunt	3:14.90
1986	Family Friend	Willie Carson	Dick Hern	Sir Michael Sobell	3:12.20
1987	Tabayaan	Alain Lequeux	Alain de Royer-Dupré	HH Aga Khan IV	3:16.80
1988	Apalachee Prince (Note: Bahamian finished first in 1988, but she was relegated to third place following a stewards' inquiry)	Éric Legrix	Jean de Roualle	Arthur Appleton	3:10.60
1989	Turgeon	Guy Guignard	Jonathan Pease	George Strawbridge	3:12.60
1990	Comte du Bourg	Dominique Boeuf	Raymond Touflan	Adolf Bader	3:12.90
1991	Justice	Thierry Jarnet	André Fabre	Tony Richards	3:13.00
1992	Dajraan	Thierry Jarnet	André Fabre	Sheikh Mohammed	3:20.60
1993	Epaphos	Éric Legrix	Pascal Bary	Egon Wanke	3:09.40
1994	Northern Spur	Thierry Jarnet	André Fabre	Tomohiro Wada	3:16.40
1995	Affidavit	Thierry Jarnet	André Fabre	Sheikh Mohammed	3:11.20
1996	Tarator	Olivier Peslier	Élie Lellouche	Wafic Saïd	3:16.10
1997	Vertical Speed	Olivier Peslier	André Fabre	Daniel Wildenstein	3:18.10
1998	Pozarica	Gérald Mossé	Nicolas Clément	Maktoum Al Maktoum	3:14.10
1999	Amilynx	Olivier Peslier	André Fabre	Jean-Luc Lagardère	3:39.80
2000	Epitre	Olivier Peslier	André Fabre	Edouard de Rothschild	3:12.20
2001	Wareed	Frankie Dettori	Saeed bin Suroor	Godolphin	3:26.70
2002	Morozov	Frankie Dettori	André Fabre	Sheikh Mohammed	3:15.80
2003	Behkara	Christophe Soumillon	Alain de Royer-Dupré	HH Aga Khan IV	3:21.20
2004	Reefscape	Thierry Gillet	André Fabre	Khalid Abdullah	3:08.10
2005	Shamdala	Christophe Soumillon	Alain de Royer-Dupré	HH Aga Khan IV	3:15.80
2006	Vendangeur	Stéphane Pasquier	Élie Lellouche	Ecurie Wildenstein	3:09.90
2007	Coastal Path	Stéphane Pasquier	André Fabre	Khalid Abdullah	3:17.80
2008	Watar	Davy Bonilla	Freddy Head	Hamdan Al Maktoum	3:10.70
2009	Manighar	Gérald Mossé	Alain de Royer-Dupré	HH Aga Khan IV	3:11.00
2010	Celtic Celeb	Thierry Thulliez	François Doumen	Henri de Pracomtal	3:32.40
2011	Shankardeh	Christophe Lemaire	Mikel Delzangles	HH Aga Khan IV	3:24.59
2012	Canticum	Grégory Benoist	David Smaga	Khalid Abdullah	3:22.82
2013	Valirann	Christophe Soumillon	Alain de Royer-Dupré	HH Aga Khan IV	3:22.68
2014	Auvray	Grégory Benoist	Élie Lellouche	Augustin-Normand / Vidal	3:10.86
2015	Vazirabad	Christophe Soumillon	Alain de Royer-Dupré	Aga Khan IV	3:09.36
2016	Doha Dream (Note: The 2016 & 2017 runnings took place at Chantilly while Longchamp was closed for redevelopment)	Grégory Benoist	André Fabre	Al Shaqab Racing	3:12.58
2017	Ice Breeze	Vincent Cheminaud	Pascal Bary	Khalid Abdullah	3:17.88
2018	Brundtland	William Buick	Charlie Appleby	Godolphin	3:17.64
2019	Technician	Pierre-Charles Boudot	Martyn Meade	Team Valor 1	3:19.86
2020	Valia	Christophe Soumillon	Alain de Royer-Dupré	Aga Khan IV	3:30.55
2021	Manobo	James Doyle	Charlie Appleby	Godolphin	3:21.76
2022	Al Qareem	Ryan Moore	Karl Burke	Nick Bradley Racing 33 + Burke	3:24.68
2023	Double Major	Maxime Guyon	Christophe Ferland	Wertheimer et Frère	3:16.45
2024	Illinois	Ryan Moore	Aidan O'Brien	Smith/Magnier/Tabor	3:16.80
2025	Tennessee Stud	Dylan Browne McMonagle	Joseph O'Brien	Westerberg/Smith/Magnier/Tabor	3:17.89
2026	Jabracadabra	Ebbe Verhestraeten	Amy Murphy	Kevin Freeman	3:16.91

== Earlier winners ==
- 1875: Salvator
- 1876:
- 1877: Nonancourt
- 1878: La Creole
- 1879: Nubienne
- 1880: Gobsec
- 1881: Patchouli
- 1882: Mademoiselle de Senlis
- 1883: Kara Kalpak
- 1884:
- 1885:
- 1886:
- 1887: Barbeau
- 1888: Amiral / Punch (Note: The 1888 race was a dead-heat and has joint winners)
- 1889: Vasistas
- 1890: Mirabeau
- 1891: Naviculaire
- 1892: Cleanthe
- 1893: Diavolo
- 1894: Toujours
- 1895:
- 1896: Champaubert
- 1897: Parasol
- 1898: Gourgouran
- 1899: Velasquez
- 1900: Theobard
- 1901: Friso
- 1902:
- 1903: Pervat
- 1904: Le Lys
- 1905: Fawn
- 1906: Storm
- 1907: Chanoine
- 1908: Five O'Clock
- 1909: Caroubier
- 1910: Rasibus
- 1911: Sea Lord
- 1912: Predicateur
- 1913: Siva
- 1914: Rollon
- 1915–18: no race
- 1919: Insensible
- 1920: Saint Pol
- 1921: Binic
- 1922: Mont Blanc
- 1923: Filibert de Savoie
- 1924: Dauphin
- 1925: Erofite
- 1926: Badari
- 1927: Bouda
- 1928: Syram
- 1929: Passaro
- 1930: Saint Antoine
- 1931: Raeburn
- 1932: Roi du Jour
- 1933: Camping
- 1934: Cerealiste
- 1935: Bokbul
- 1936: Le Vizir
- 1937: Ginko Biloba
- 1938: Six Avril
- 1939: Foxhound
- 1940: Labrador
- 1941: Clodoche
- 1942: Le Nuage
- 1943: L'Aretin
- 1944: Deux Pour Cent
- 1945:
- 1946:
- 1947: Morkandor
- 1948:
- 1949: Suez
- 1950: Pan
- 1951: Stymphale
- 1952: Magnific
- 1953: Nordiste
- 1954: Yorick
- 1955: Malar
- 1956: Vattel
- 1957: Altipan
- 1958: Tello
- 1959: Buisson D'Argent
- 1960: Chrysler
- 1961: Sempervivum
- 1962: Pegomas
- 1963: Rheinfall
- 1964: Waldmeister
- 1965: Cheik
- 1966: Parabellum
- 1967: Pointille
- 1968: no race
- 1969: Nonancourt
- 1970: Largny
- 1971: Royaltex
- 1972: Lassalle
- 1973: Rasgavor
- 1974: Sagaro
- 1975: Chawn
- 1976: Secret Man
- 1977: Montorselli
- 1978: Brave Johnny
- 1979: Soleil Noir

== See also ==
- List of French flat horse races
- Recurring sporting events established in 1875 – this race is included under its original title, Prix de l'Espérance.
