= Prix Gladiateur =

Flat horse race in France

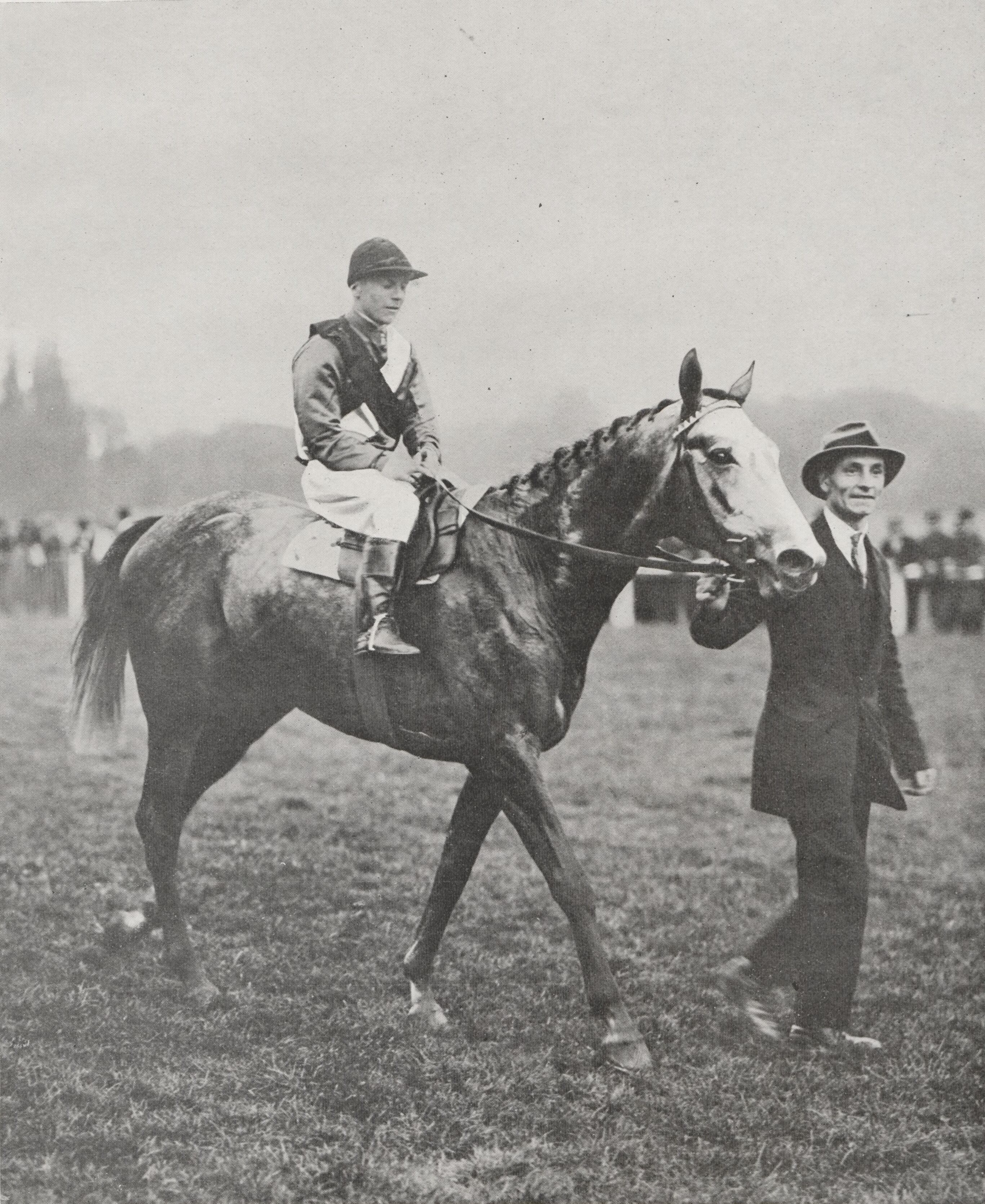
- 1922 & 1923 winner, Flechois. (Longchamp, 28 October 1923)
- Class: Group 3
- Location: Longchamp Racecourse; Paris, France
- Inaugurated: 1807
- Race type: Flat / Thoroughbred
- Sponsor: Qatar
- Website: france-galop.com

Race information
- Distance: 3,100 metres (1m 7½f)
- Surface: Turf
- Track: Right-handed
- Qualification: Four-years-old and up
- Weight: 57 kg Allowances; 1½ kg for fillies and mares 1 kg if not Group placed * Penalties; 3 kg for Group 1 winners * 2 kg for Group 2 winners * 1 kg for Group 3 winners * * since September 1 last year
- Purse: €80,000 (2021); 1st: €40,000

Prix Gladiateur
2024
Sevenna's Knight	Harbour Wind	Presage Nocturne

Previous years
2023
Lastotchka	Fasol	Vert Liberte
2022
Big Call	The Good Man	Investor
2021
Bubble Smart	Karlstad	Call The Wind

2020-2011
2020
Called To The Bar	Think Of Me	Sublimis
2019
Called To The Bar	Haky	Boulevard
2018
Called To The Bar	Holdthasigreen	Morgan Le Faye
2017
Vazirabad	Holdthasigreen	Trip To Rhodos
2016
Vazirabad	Nahual	Settler's Son
2015
Walzertakt	Oriental Fox	Kicky Blue
2014
Bathyrhon	Kicky Blue	High Jinx
2013
Domeside	Les Beaufs	Goldtara
2012
Ivory Land	Miss Lago	Willing Foe
2011
Ley Hunter	Tac De Boistron	Shamanova

2010-2001
2010
Gentoo	Watar	Kimble
2009
Kasbah Bliss	Pointilliste	Incanto Dream
2008
Kasbah Bliss	Bannaby	High Maintenance
2007
Varevees	Getaway	Le Miracle
2006
Le Miracle	Salutino	Soledad
2005
Reefscape	Ostankino	Allez Olive
2004
Westerner	Cut Quartz	Clear Thinking
2003
Darasim	Westerner	Soreze
2002
Miraculous	Bangalore	Terrazzo
2001
Yavana's Pace	Woodford Reserve	Generic

2000-1990
2000
Orchestra Stall	Wajina	Tajoun
1999
Tajoun	Pozarica	Divination
1998
Tiraaz	Solo Mio	Asolo
1997
Orchestra Stall	Double Eclipse	Chief Contender
1996
Always Aloof	Kassani	Ming Dynasty
1995
L'Ile Tudy	Always Aloof	Epaphos
1994
Safety In Numbers	Always Earnest	Ballet Prince
1993
Oh So Risky	Non Partisan	Sought Out
1992
Le Montagnard	Dajraan	Thunder Grey
1991
Victoire Bleue	Our Account	Proud Panther
1990
River Test	Chelsea Girl	Our Account

The Prix Gladiateur is a Group 3 flat horse race in France open to thoroughbreds aged four years or older. It is run at Longchamp over a distance of 3,100 metres (about 1 mile and 7½ furlongs), and it is scheduled to take place each year in September.

== History ==
The event is considered to be France's oldest surviving horse race. It was established in 1807, and was originally called the Grand Prix. The first version was contested over two circuits of the Champ de Mars, a distance of 4,000 metres.

The race was renamed the Grand Prix Royal in 1834. It was held at Chantilly in 1846. It became known as the Grand Prix National in 1848, and the Grand Prix Impérial in 1853.

The Grand Prix Impérial was transferred to Longchamp and increased to 6,000 metres in 1857. It was retitled the Grand Prix de l'Empereur and extended to 6,200 metres in 1861. This distance, about 3 miles and 7 furlongs, was maintained for almost a century.

The race was renamed in honour of Gladiateur, a notable previous winner, in 1866. The newly titled Prix Gladiateur was cancelled because of the Franco-Prussian War in 1870.

The race took place at Chantilly in 1906. It was abandoned throughout World War I, with no running from 1914 to 1918. It was cancelled twice during World War II, in 1939 and 1940. It was staged at Le Tremblay in 1943 and 1944.

The Prix Gladiateur was cut to 4,800 metres in 1955. It was shortened to 4,000 metres in 1977, and to 3,100 metres in 1991.

== Records ==
Most successful horse (3 wins):

- Called To The Bar – 2018, 2019, 2020

Leading jockey (5 wins):

- Spreoty – Hervine (1852), Echelle (1853), Royal Quand Meme (1854), Monarque (1857), Mon Etoile (1862)
- Christophe Soumillon – Reefscape (2005), Domeside (2013), Walzertakt (2015), Vazirabad (2016, 2017)
- Maxime Guyon - Bathyrhon (2014), Called To The Bar (2018, 2019, 2020), Big Call (2022)

Leading trainer (13 wins):

- Tom Jennings – Hervine (1852), Echelle (1853), Royal Quand Meme (1854), Monarque (1857), Lysiscote (1860), Surprise (1861), Gladiateur (1866), Auguste (1868), Trocadero (1869), Nougat (1876), Verneuil (1878), Clementine (1879), Courtois (1880)

Leading owner (10 wins):

- Frédéric de Lagrange – Monarque (1857), Lysiscote (1860), Surprise (1861), Gladiateur (1866), Auguste (1868), Trocadero (1869), Nougat (1876), Verneuil (1878), Clementine (1879), Courtois (1880)

== Winners since 1981 ==
Year	Winner	Age	Jockey	Trainer	Owner	Time
1981	Kelbomec	5	Jean-Claude Desaint	J. C. Cunnington	Mrs Jacques Barker	4:45.80
1982	Kelbomec	6	Jean-Claude Desaint	J. C. Cunnington	Mrs Jacques Barker	4:39.00
1983	Balitou	4	Cash Asmussen	Patrick Biancone	Daniel Wildenstein	
1984	Mister Jack	5	Yves Saint-Martin	Pierre Biancone	Jacques Baillif	5:01.20
1985	Balitou	6	Éric Legrix	Patrick Biancone	Daniel Wildenstein	4:40.10
1986	Silver Green	5	Yves Saint-Martin	Alain de Royer-Dupré	Marquesa de Moratalla	4:36.70
1987	Yaka	4	Dominique Boeuf	Alain Chelet	Mrs Arthur Dewez	4:47.90
1988	Sadeem	5	Greville Starkey	Guy Harwood	Sheikh Mohammed	4:21.30
1989	Hi Lass	4	Tony Cruz	Jonathan Pease	Arthur Budgett	4:22.10
1990	River Test	4	Freddy Head	David Smaga	Lord Weinstock	4:25.20
1991	Victoire Bleue	4	Thierry Jarnet	André Fabre	Daniel Wildenstein	3:21.00
1992	Le Montagnard	4	Christian Phelippeau	Guy Henrot	Joel Blandin	3:26.70
1993	Oh So Risky	6	John Williams	David Elsworth	Oh So Risky Syndicate	3:22.90
1994	Safety in Numbers	4	Tony Ives	Lady Herries	Edwin Cohen	3:32.30
1995	L'Ile Tudy	5	Alain Badel	Myriam Bollack-Badel	Georges Halphen	3:21.80
1996	Always Aloof	5	Olivier Peslier	Michael Stoute	Sven Hanson	3:19.10
1997	Orchestra Stall	5	Pat Eddery	John Dunlop	Sir David Sieff	3:18.30
1998	Tiraaz	4	Gérald Mossé	Alain de Royer-Dupré	HH Aga Khan IV	3:31.10
1999	Tajoun	5	Gérald Mossé	Alain de Royer-Dupré	HH Aga Khan IV	3:24.20
2000	Orchestra Stall	8	Thierry Thulliez	John Dunlop	Sir David Sieff	3:23.80
2001	Yavana's Pace	9	Joe Fanning	Mark Johnston	Joan Keaney	3:25.50
2002	Miraculous	5	Thierry Jarnet	Didier Prod'homme	Bernard Giraudon	3:20.10
2003	Darasim	5	Joe Fanning	Mark Johnston	Markus Graff	3:18.80
2004	Westerner	5	Olivier Peslier	Élie Lellouche	Ecurie Wildenstein	3:26.60
2005	Reefscape	4	Christophe Soumillon	André Fabre	Khalid Abdullah	3:28.40
2006	Le Miracle	5	Dominique Boeuf	Werner Baltromei	R'stall Gestüt Hachtsee	3:15.90
2007	Varevees	4	Thierry Jarnet	Joel Boisnard	Jean Uzel	3:15.00
2008	Kasbah Bliss	6	Thierry Thulliez	François Doumen	Henri de Pracomtal	3:14.50
2009	Kasbah Bliss	7	Thierry Thulliez	François Doumen	Henri de Pracomtal	3:18.40
2010	Gentoo	6	Gérald Mossé	Alain Lyon	Serge Tripier-Mondancin	3:34.10
2011	Ley Hunter	4	Mickael Barzalona	André Fabre	Godolphin	3:33.99
2012	Ivory Land	5	Stéphane Pasquier	Alain de Royer-Dupré	Eduardo Fierro	3:18.16
2013	Domeside	7	Christophe Soumillon	Mauricio Delcher-Sanchez	Safsaf Canarias Srl	3:27.24
2014	Bathyrhon	4	Maxime Guyon	Pia Brandt	Avaz Ismoilov	3:15.76
2015	Walzertakt^{[a]}	6	Christophe Soumillon	Jean-Pierre Carvalho	Gestut Aesculap	3:26.62
2016	Vazirabad^{[b]}	4	Christophe Soumillon	Alain de Royer-Dupré	Aga Khan IV	3:17.96
2017	Vazirabad^{[b]}	5	Christophe Soumillon	Alain de Royer-Dupré	Aga Khan IV	3:18.13
2018	Called To The Bar	4	Maxime Guyon	Pia Brandt	Fair Salinia Ltd	3:18.23
2019	Called To The Bar	5	Maxime Guyon	Pia Brandt	Fair Salinia Ltd	3:23.42
2020	Called To The Bar	6	Maxime Guyon	Pia Brandt	Fair Salinia Ltd	3:21.11
2021	Bubble Smart	4	Ioritz Mendizabal	Mikel Delzangles	Zak Bloodstock	3:29.34
2022	Big Call	5	Maxime Guyon	Christophe Ferland	Christophe Ferland	3:20.34
2023	Lastotchka	4	Theo Bachelot	Jean-Marie Beguigne	Ecurie Forgeard/Bonnier	3:19.75
2024	Sevenna´s Knight	4	Mickael Barzalona	André Fabre	OTI Management Ltd	3:30.60
2025	Double Major	5	Maxime Guyon	Christophe Ferland	Wertheimer & Frere	3:34.70
2026	Odemar	6	Dorian Provost	Markus Münch	Erich Schwaiger	3:18.85

^{a} Fly With Me finished first in 2015 but was disqualified after testing positive for a banned substance.
^{b} The 2016 & 2017 runnings took place at Chantilly while Longchamp was closed for redevelopment.

== Earlier winners ==
- 1834: Felix
- 1835: Miss Annette
- 1836: Volante
- 1837: Franck
- 1838: Corisandre
- 1839: Eylau
- 1840: Nautilus
- 1841: Giges
- 1842: Minuit
- 1843: Jenny
- 1844: Drummer
- 1845: Cavatine
- 1846: Fitz Emilius
- 1847: Predestinee
- 1848: Morok
- 1849: Dulcamara
- 1850: Serenade
- 1851: Messine
- 1852: Hervine
- 1853: Echelle
- 1854: Royal Quand Meme
- 1855: Festival
- 1856: Ronzi
- 1857: Monarque
- 1858: Miss Cath
- 1859: Tippler
- 1860: Lysiscote
- 1861: Surprise
- 1862: Mon Etoile
- 1863: Souvenir
- 1864: Noelie
- 1865: Ninon de Lenclos
- 1866: Gladiateur
- 1867: Vertugadin
- 1868: Auguste
- 1869: Trocadero
- 1870: no race
- 1871: Don Carlos
- 1872: Dutch Skater
- 1873: Barbillon
- 1874: Christiania
- 1875: Figaro
- 1876: Nougat
- 1877: Mondaine
- 1878: Verneuil
- 1879: Clementine
- 1880: Courtois
- 1881: Pourquoi
- 1882: Bariolet
- 1883: Mademoiselle de Senlis
- 1884: Satory
- 1885: Lavaret
- 1886: Escarboucle
- 1887: Upas
- 1888: Tenebreuse
- 1889: Tenebreuse
- 1890: Carmaux
- 1891: Mirabeau
- 1892: Primrose
- 1893: Aquarium
- 1894: Aquarium
- 1895: La Licorne
- 1896: Omnium II
- 1897: Elf
- 1898: Elf
- 1899: Patriarche
- 1900: Sospiro
- 1901: Mademoiselle de Longchamps
- 1902: Amer Picon
- 1903: Amer Picon
- 1904: Vieux Paris
- 1905: Maximum
- 1906: Clyde
- 1907: Punta Gorda
- 1908: Rabat Joie
- 1909: Sea Sick
- 1910: Pierre Benite
- 1911: Basse Pointe
- 1912: Chambre de l'Edit
- 1913: Philippe
- 1914–18: no race
- 1919: Passebreul
- 1920: Bachlyk
- 1921: Odol
- 1922: Flechois
- 1923: Flechois
- 1924: Trevise
- 1925: Cerfeuil
- 1926: Tomy
- 1927: Soun
- 1928: Bouda
- 1929: Nopal
- 1930: Monsieur le Marechal
- 1931: Filidor
- 1932: Reverende
- 1933: Voila
- 1934: Prince Oli
- 1935: Dejazcomba
- 1936: Bokbul
- 1937: Trevisani
- 1938: Pretender
- 1939–40: no race
- 1941: Rosette
- 1942: Ughald
- 1943: L'Aligote
- 1944: Marsyas
- 1945: Woodcutter
- 1946: Albor
- 1947: Blue Butterfly
- 1948: Monticola
- 1949: Blue Butterfly
- 1950: Vatelys
- 1951: Deux Points
- 1952: Ysard
- 1953: Xaret
- 1954: Ring Etoile
- 1955: Fil Rouge
- 1956: Savoyard
- 1957: Romantisme
- 1958: Ranchiquito
- 1959: Epsom Victory
- 1960: Epsom Victory
- 1961: Taine
- 1962: Hunch
- 1963: Kistinie
- 1964: Greyhound
- 1965: Fantomas
- 1966: Pompon Rouge
- 1967: Alciglide
- 1968: Samos
- 1969: Clairon
- 1970: Faux Monnayeur
- 1971: Barado
- 1972: Hickleton
- 1973: Lassalle
- 1974: Forceful
- 1975: Campo Moro
- 1976: Knight Templar
- 1977: John Cherry
- 1978: Biliboy
- 1979: Marson
- 1980: Anifa

== See also ==
- List of French flat horse races
- Recurring sporting events established in 1807 – this race is included under its original title, Grand Prix.
