= Prix Kergorlay =

Flat horse race in France

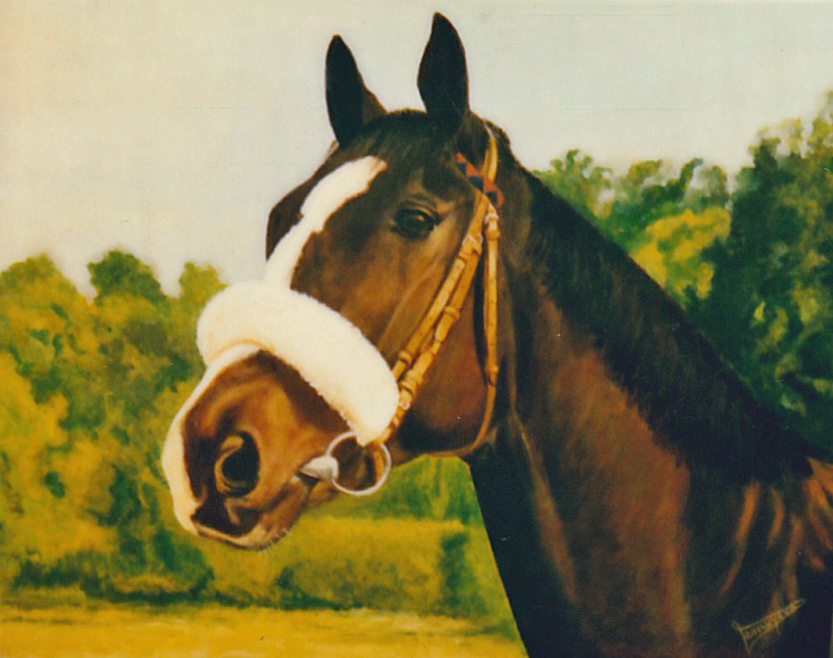
- Shafaraz, oil on canvas Painting by Bob Demuyser (1920–2003)
- Class: Group 2
- Location: Deauville Racecourse; Deauville, France
- Inaugurated: 1864
- Race type: Flat / Thoroughbred
- Sponsor: Darley
- Website: france-galop.com

Race information
- Distance: 3,000 metres (1 7/8 miles)
- Surface: Turf
- Track: Right-handed
- Qualification: Three-years-old and up
- Weight: 54 kg (3yo); 59 kg (4yo+); Allowances; 1 1/2 kg for fillies and mares Penalties; 2 kg for Group 1 winners * 1 kg for Group 2 winners * * since 1 October last year
- Purse: €130,000 (2021); 1st: €74,100

Prix Kergorlay
2025
Double Major	Goya Senora	Sevenna's Knight

Previous years
2024
Double Major	Goya Senora	Alessio
2023
Sober	Grand Alliance	The Good Man
2022
Goya Senora	Joie De Soir	Skazino
2021
Skazino	Rip Van Lips	Red Verdon

2020-2011
2020
Call The Wind	Ashrun	Windstoss
2019
Marmelo	Call The Wind	Haky
2018
Holdthasigreen	Marmelo	Nearly Caught
2017
Marmelo	Desert Skyline	Holdthasigreen
2016
Nearly Caught	Candarliya	Trip To Rhodos
2015
Alex My Boy	Oriental Fox	Walzertakt
2014
Protectionist	Fly With Me	Altano
2013
Verema	Joshua Tree	Dance Moves
2012
Joshua Tree	Brigantin	Shahwardi
2011
Jukebox Jury	Kasbah Bliss	Brigantin

2010–2001
2010
Americain	Manighar	Blek
2009
Schiaparelli	Mojave Moon	Candy Gift
2008
Ponte Tresa	Mad Rush	Coastal Path
2007
Getaway	Lord Du Sud	Ponte Tresa
2006
Lord Du Sud	Policy Maker	Le Miracle
2005
Alcazar	Reefscape	Ostankino
2004
Gold Medallist	Brian Boru	Cut Quartz
2003
Darasim	Westerner	Swing Wing
2002
Cut Quartz	Clety	Morozov
2001
Generic	Samsaam	Speedmaster

2000–1990
2000
Persian Punch	Wajina	Three Cheers
1999
Kayf Tara	Invermark	Largesse
1998
Arctic Owl	Grey Shot	Tajoun
1997
Classic Cliche	Orchestra Stall	Chief Contender
1996
Kassani	Nononito	Chief Contender
1995
Peckinpah's Soul	Nononito	Epaphos
1994
Molesnes	Epaphos	Arcadian Heights
1993
Raintrap	Samourzakan	Zinaad
1992
Sought Out	Drum Taps	Michelozzo
1991
Turgeon	Further Flight	Le Pommier D'Or
1990
Al Maheb	Ethan Frome	Ozal

The Prix Kergorlay is a Group 2 flat horse race in France open to thoroughbreds aged three years or older. It is run at Deauville over a distance of 3,000 metres (about 1 7/8 miles), and it is scheduled to take place each year in August.

== History ==
The event was established in 1864, and it was originally called the Prix de la Société d'Encouragement. It was named after the Société d'Encouragement, a governing body of horse racing in France. The inaugural running was part of Deauville's first ever race meeting, and the prize money for the winning owner was 5,100 francs. In its early years the event was contested over 3,000 metres. It was cancelled because of the Franco-Prussian War in 1871.

The race became known as the Prix de Longchamps in 1875. It was cut to 2,800 metres in 1889, and to 2,600 metres in 1896. It was extended to 3,400 metres in 1907.

It was renamed in memory of Florian de Kergorlay (died October 1910), a former chairman of the Société des Courses de Deauville, in 1911. The Prix Florian de Kergorlay was abandoned throughout World War I, and it returned with a distance of 3,000 metres in 1919.

The title of the race was shortened to the Prix Kergorlay in 1929. It was cancelled twice during World War II, in 1940 and 1941. The event's usual venue was closed during this period, so it was staged temporarily at Le Tremblay (1942–43) and Longchamp (1944–45).

== Records ==
Most successful horse (2 wins):

- Fourire – 1899, 1900
- Sea Sick – 1909, 1910
- La Francaise – 1911, 1912
- Ardan – 1945, 1946
- Celadon – 1963, 1965
- Marmelo – 2017, 2019

Leading jockey (4 wins):

- Arthur Watkins – Vertugadin (1866), Ruy Blas (1867), Dutch Tar (1868), L'Aspirant (1870)
- George Stern – Saxon (1901), Genial (1905), Sauge Pourpree (1908), Grillemont (1923)
- Jacques Doyasbère – Marsyas (1944), Ardan (1945, 1946), Lavarede (1951)
- Maurice Philipperon – Waylay (1966), Homeric (1972), Valuta (1973), Tipperary Fixer (1981)
- Cash Asmussen – King Luthier (1986), Top Sunrise (1989), Turgeon (1991), Sought Out (1992)
- Olivier Peslier – Molesnes (1994), Ponte Tresa (2008), Alex My Boy (2015), Call The Wind (2020)

Leading trainer (9 wins):

- Henry Jennings – Ruy Blas (1867), Dutch Tar (1868), L'Aspirant (1870), Revigny (1873), Montargis (1874), Basquine (1876), Giboulee (1877), Mourle (1879), Arbitre (1880)

Leading owner (6 wins):

- Alexandre Aumont – Revigny (1873), Basquine (1876), Mademoiselle de Senlis (1883), Siberie (1888), Nativa (1890), Floreal (1891)

== Winners since 1980 ==
Year	Winner	Age	Jockey	Trainer	Owner	Time
1980	Marson	5	Yves Saint-Martin	Robert Collet	Michel Engel
1981	Tipperary Fixer	3	Maurice Philipperon	John Fellows	Ben Arbib
1982	Valentinian	4	Willie Carson	Dick Hern	12th Earl of Scarbrough	3:12.1
1983	Kelbomec	7	Jean-Claude Desaint	J. C. Cunnington	Mrs Jacques Barker	3:10.2
1984	South Gale	4	Guy Guignard	Mick Bartholomew	Jean-François Gribomont	3:09.1
1985	Faburola	4	Éric Legrix	Patrick Biancone	Jules Ouaki	3:25.5
1986	King Luthier	4	Cash Asmussen	André Fabre	Joseph Atrib
1987	Almaarad	4	Willie Carson	John Dunlop	Hamdan Al Maktoum	3:14.1
1988	Apalachee Prince	3	Éric Legrix	Jean de Roualle	Arthur I. Appleton	3:10.2
1989	Top Sunrise	4	Cash Asmussen	André Fabre	Charles E. Schmidt	3:11.5
1990	Al Maheb	4	Michael Roberts	Alec Stewart	Hamdan Al Maktoum	3:14.3
1991	Turgeon (Note: Further Flight finished first in 1991, but he was relegated to second place following a stewards' inquiry)	5	Cash Asmussen	Jonathan Pease	George Strawbridge	3:15.2
1992	Sought Out	4	Cash Asmussen	John Hammond	Lord Weinstock	3:25.4
1993	Raintrap	3	Pat Eddery	André Fabre	Khalid Abdullah	3:25.7
1994	Molesnes	4	Olivier Peslier	Marcel Rolland	Michel Perret	3:25.1
1995	Peckinpah's Soul	3	Freddy Head	David Smaga	Ecurie Leader	3:18.7
1996	Kassani	4	Gérald Mossé	Alain de Royer-Dupré	HH Aga Khan IV	3:16.1
1997	Classic Cliche	5	John Reid	Saeed bin Suroor	Godolphin	3:20.9
1998	Arctic Owl	4	Kieren Fallon	James Fanshawe	The Owl Society	3:13.9
1999	Kayf Tara	5	Frankie Dettori	Saeed bin Suroor	Godolphin	3:21.9
2000	Persian Punch	7	Richard Hughes	David Elsworth	Jeff Smith	3:14.4
2001	Generic	6	Alain Junk	Jean-Paul Gallorini	Teodoro Biasioli	3:20.4
2002	Cut Quartz	5	Christophe Lemaire	Richard Gibson	Antoinette Kavanagh	3:11.8
2003	Darasim	5	Joe Fanning	Mark Johnston	Markus Graff	3:14.6
2004	Gold Medallist	4	Richard Hughes	David Elsworth	Jeff Smith	3:20.9
2005	Alcazar	10	Micky Fenton	Hughie Morrison	Repard / Melrose et al.	3:18.0
2006	Lord du Sud	5	Ioritz Mendizabal	Jean-Claude Rouget	Béatrice Hermelin	3:20.7
2007	Getaway	4	Stéphane Pasquier	André Fabre	Georg von Ullmann	3:22.1
2008	Ponte Tresa	5	Olivier Peslier	Yves de Nicolay	Erika Hilger	3:12.1
2009	Schiaparelli	6	Frankie Dettori	Saeed bin Suroor	Godolphin	3:09.9
2010	Americain	5	Gérald Mossé	Alain de Royer-Dupré	Ryan / Bamford	3:13.2
2011	Jukebox Jury	5	Neil Callan	Mark Johnston	Alan Spence	3:14.2
2012	Joshua Tree	5	Ryan Moore	Marco Botti	Al Nabooda & Albahou	3:17.7
2013	Verema	4	Christophe Lemaire	Alain de Royer-Dupré	HH Aga Khan IV	3:22.09
2014	Protectionist	4	Eduardo Pedroza	Andreas Wöhler	Dr Christoph Berglar	3:30.08
2015	Alex My Boy	4	Olivier Peslier	Andreas Wöhler	Jaber Abdullah	3:19.42
2016	Nearly Caught	6	Umberto Rispoli	Hughie Morrison	A. N. Solomons	3:13.41
2017	Marmelo	4	Christophe Soumillon	Hughie Morrison	The Fairy Story Partnership	3:09.56
2018	Holdthasigreen	6	Tony Piccone	Bruno Audouin	Jean Gilbert	3:10.42
2019	Marmelo	6	Christophe Soumillon	Hughie Morrison	The Fairy Story Partnership & Aziz Kheir	3:18.10
2020	Call The Wind	6	Olivier Peslier	Freddy Head	George Strawbridge	3:17.00
2021	Skazino	5	Mickael Barzalona	Cedric Rossi	Le Haras De La Gousserie	3:14.53
2022	Goya Senora	6	Gregory Benoist	Yann Barberot	Alain Jathiere & Ecurie Haras Des Senora	3:14.01
2023	Sober	4	Maxime Guyon	André Fabre	Wertheimer et Frère	3:13.22
2024	Double Major	4	Stephane Pasquier	Christophe Ferland	Wertheimer et Frère	3:20.00
2025	Double Major	5	Maxime Guyon	Christophe Ferland	Wertheimer et Frère	3:22.32
2026	Defiantly	4	Dylan Browne McMonagle	Joseph Patrick O'Brien	Australia Bloodstock Two	3:15.74

== Earlier winners ==
- 1864: Nobility
- 1865: La Reine Berthe
- 1866: Vertugadin
- 1867: Ruy Blas
- 1868: Dutch Tar
- 1869: Clotho
- 1870: L'Aspirant
- 1871: no race
- 1872: Bivouac
- 1873: Revigny
- 1874: Montargis
- 1875: Nougat
- 1876: Basquine
- 1877: Giboulee
- 1878: Gift
- 1879: Mourle
- 1880: Arbitre
- 1881: Castillon
- 1882: Aquilin
- 1883: Mademoiselle de Senlis
- 1884: Escogriffe
- 1885: Cafe Procope / Vicq *
- 1886: Fripon
- 1887: Brisolier
- 1888: Siberie
- 1889: Prix Fixe
- 1890: Nativa
- 1891: Floreal
- 1892: Galette
- 1893: Boissiere
- 1894:
- 1895: Lutin
- 1896: Le Sagittaire
- 1897: Riposte
- 1898: Hawamdieh
- 1899: Fourire
- 1900: Fourire
- 1901: Saxon
- 1902: Maximum
- 1903: Ex Voto
- 1904: Turenne
- 1905: Genial
- 1906: Maintenon
- 1907: Punta Gorda
- 1908: Sauge Pourpree
- 1909: Sea Sick
- 1910: Sea Sick
- 1911: La Francaise
- 1912: La Francaise
- 1913: Predicateur
- 1914–18: no race
- 1919: Tullamore
- 1920: Juveigneur
- 1921: Nouvel An
- 1922: Keror
- 1923: Grillemont
- 1924: Isola Bella
- 1925: Dark Diamond
- 1926: Asteroide
- 1927: Sou du Franc
- 1928: Bois Josselyn
- 1929: Innoxa
- 1930: Trie Chateau
- 1931: Deiri
- 1932: Fog Horn
- 1933: La Souriciere
- 1934: Dark Dew
- 1935: Prince Achille
- 1936: Le Vizir
- 1937: Khasnadar
- 1938: Molitor
- 1939: Premier Baiser
- 1940–41: no race
- 1942: Vigilance
- 1943: Verso II
- 1944: Marsyas
- 1945: Ardan
- 1946: Ardan
- 1947: Souverain
- 1948: Bey
- 1949: Espace Vital
- 1950: Ciel Etoile
- 1951: Lavarede
- 1952: Fast Fox
- 1953: Silex
- 1954: Elu
- 1955: Macip
- 1956: Pont Levis
- 1957: Romantisme
- 1958: Achaz
- 1959: Vieux Chateau
- 1960: Grand Schelem
- 1961: Gisors
- 1962: Bounteous
- 1963: Celadon
- 1964: Ashavan
- 1965: Celadon
- 1966: Waylay
- 1967: Mehari
- 1968: Pardallo
- 1969: Pandora Bay
- 1970: Reindeer
- 1971: Miss Dan
- 1972: Homeric
- 1973: Valuta
- 1974: Ribecourt
- 1975: Moss Trooper
- 1976: Citoyen
- 1977: Solaro
- 1978: Shafaraz
- 1979: Campero

* The 1885 race was a dead-heat and has joint winners.

== See also ==
- List of French flat horse races
- Recurring sporting events established in 1864 – this race is included under its original title, Prix de la Société d'Encouragement.
