= Prix Gérald de Geoffre =

Flat horse race in France

- Class: Group 3
- Location: Longchamp Racecourse; Paris, France
- Inaugurated: 1864
- Race type: Flat / Thoroughbred
- Website: france-galop.com

Race information
- Distance: 3,000 metres (1 7/8 miles)
- Surface: Turf
- Track: Right-handed
- Qualification: Three-year-olds
- Weight: 56 kg Allowances; 1 1/2 kg for fillies 1 kg if not Group placed * Penalties; 3 kg for Group 2 winners * 3 kg if two Group 3 wins * 1 kg if one Group 3 win * * since January 1
- Purse: €80,000 (2016); 1st: €40,000

Prix de Lutèce
2025
Espoir Avenir	Emit	Hotheaded

Previous years
2024
Columbus	Sir Chartwell	Shamarkand
2023
Gallerist	Double Major	Winter Pudding
2022
Master Gatsby	Fasol	Virtual Rock
2021
Esope	Tides Of War	Gabello

2020-2011
2020
Paix	Step By Step	Measure Of Time
2019
Moonlight Spirit	Think Of Me	Homer
2018
Jackfinbar	Ziyad	Mystic Sunshine
2017
Darbuzan	Monreal	Casterton
2016
Moonshiner	Dounyapour	Cleonte
2014
Auvray	Glaring	Theme Astral
2013
Valirann	Lucky Look	Montclair
2012
Verema	Canticum	Only A Pleasure
2011
Pacifique	Miss Lago	Ibicenco

2010-2001
2010
Brigantin	Shamanova	Permit
2009
Wajir	Manighar	Investissement
2008
Shemima	Americain	Watar
2007
Coastal Path	Dancing Lady	Royal And Regal
2006
Getaway	Vendangeur	Armand
2005
Shamdala	Fraloga	Palomar
2004
Etendard Indien	Reefscape	Double Green
2003
Risk Seeker	Grey Glitters	Clear Thinking
2002
Savannah Bay	Swing Wing	Charley Bates
2001
Street Shaana	Capal Garmon	Pushkin

2000-1990
2000
Epitre	Mister Kick	Sopran Montanelli
1999
Northerntown	Rhagaas	Amilynx
1998
Russian Hope	Ocean Of Storms	Murghem
1997
Three Cheers	Bonapartiste	Warbler
1996
Tarator	Kharizmi	Chief Contender
1995
Grey Shot	Court Of Honour	Periple
1994
The Little Thief	Northern Spur	Sheshara
1993
Shaiybara	Raintrap	Jo Knows
1992
Dadarissime	Jamshid	Assessor
1991
Sought Out	Dariyoun	Luynes
1990
North Col	Amour Royal	Glorify

The Prix Gérald de Geoffre is a Group 3 flat horse race in France open to three-year-old thoroughbreds. It is run at Longchamp over a distance of 3,000 metres (about 1 7/8 miles), and it is scheduled to take place each year in early September.

== History ==
The event was originally called the Prix de Lutèce and was named after Lutetia (in French, Lutèce), a Gallo-Roman city located on the site of what is now Paris. The first version was established in 1864, and it usually took place in the spring. Its conditions varied, but in its later years it was a 2,400-metre race for horses aged three or older. It continued to be staged until 1968.

The present version, a long-distance event for three-year-olds, was first held in 1978. It now serves as a trial for the following month's Prix Royal-Oak. The last horse to win both races in the same year was Agent Double in 1984.

The race is currently run in September, but it was part of early October's Prix de l'Arc de Triomphe fixture from 1988 to 1998. It was given its present title in 2024.

== Records ==
Leading jockey since 1978 (7 wins):

- Christophe Soumillon – Etendard Indien (2004), Shamdala (2005), Getaway (2006), Shemima (2008), Vazirabad (2015), Darbuzan (2017), Paix (2020)

Leading trainer since 1978 (9 wins):

- André Fabre – Galant Vert (1983), Balsam (1987), Mardonius (1989), Epitre (2000), Street Shaana (2001), Etendard Indien (2004), Getaway (2006), Coastal Path (2007), Brigantin (2010)

Leading owner since 1978 (7 wins):

- HH Aga Khan IV – Anazid (1986), Shaiybara (1993), Valirann (2013), Shamdala (2005), Shemima (2008), Verema (2012), Vazirabad (2015)

== Winners since 1978 ==
Year	Winner	Jockey	Trainer	Owner	Time
1978	Nizon	Philippe Paquet	François Boutin		3:20.40
1979	Prove It Baby	Philippe Paquet	François Boutin	Walter Haefner
1980	What a Joy	Jean-Luc Kessas	Bernard Sécly	Lawrence Gelb
1981	Tipperary Fixer	Maurice Philipperon	John Fellows	Ben Arbib
1982	Balitou	Alfred Gibert	Patrick Biancone	Mrs Patrick Goureau
1983	Galant Vert	Henri Samani	André Fabre	Guy de Rothschild
1984	Agent Double	Freddy Head	Criquette Head	Jacques Wertheimer
1985	Khaelan	Lester Piggott	Steve Norton	Ahmed bin Salman
1986	Anazid	Yves Saint-Martin	Alain de Royer-Dupré	HH Aga Khan IV
1987	Balsam	Cash Asmussen	André Fabre	Moufid Dabaghi
1988	Floripedes	Richard Briard	Georges Bridgland	Sir James Goldsmith	3:22.70
1989	Mardonius	Cash Asmussen	André Fabre	Sheikh Mohammed	3:10.90
1990	North Col	Tony Cruz	Jonathan Pease	Simon Emmet	3:14.80
1991	Sought Out	Cash Asmussen	Michael Stoute	Lord Weinstock	3:18.00
1992	Dadarissime	Cash Asmussen	Georges Bridgland	Sir James Goldsmith	3:30.00
1993	Shaiybara	Gérald Mossé	John Oxx	HH Aga Khan IV	3:38.20
1994	The Little Thief	Alain Junk	Eric Danel	George Ohrstrom	3:13.10
1995	Grey Shot	Frankie Dettori	Ian Balding	Jeff Smith	3:20.60
1996	Tarator	Thierry Jarnet	Élie Lellouche	Wafic Saïd	3:18.60
1997	Three Cheers	Frankie Dettori	John Gosden	Sheikh Mohammed	3:08.70
1998	Russian Hope	Goulven Toupel	Henri-Alex Pantall	Edouard de Rothschild	3:21.40
1999	Northerntown	Davy Bonilla	Freddy Head	Wertheimer et Frère	3:10.00
2000	Epitre	Olivier Peslier	André Fabre	Edouard de Rothschild	3:24.80
2001	Street Shaana	Olivier Peslier	André Fabre	Jean-Luc Lagardère	3:18.40
2002	Savannah Bay	Olivier Doleuze	Brian Meehan	Joe Allbritton	3:10.60
2003	Risk Seeker	Dominique Boeuf	Élie Lellouche	Ecurie Wildenstein	3:12.90
2004	Etendard Indien	Christophe Soumillon	André Fabre	Edouard de Rothschild	3:29.00
2005	Shamdala	Christophe Soumillon	Alain de Royer-Dupré	HH Aga Khan IV	3:16.30
2006	Getaway	Christophe Soumillon	André Fabre	Georg von Ullmann	3:13.30
2007	Coastal Path	Stéphane Pasquier	André Fabre	Khalid Abdullah	3:07.80
2008	Shemima (Note: Americain finished first in 2008, but he was relegated to second place following a stewards' inquiry)	Christophe Soumillon	Alain de Royer-Dupré	HH Aga Khan IV	3:20.00
2009	Wajir	Anthony Crastus	Élie Lellouche	Ecurie Wildenstein	3:16.10
2010	Brigantin	Pierre-Charles Boudot	André Fabre	Elisabeth Fabre	3:10.22
2011	Pacifique	Gérald Mossé	Alain de Royer-Dupré	Skymarc / Monceaux	3:22.06
2012	Verema	Christophe Lemaire	Alain de Royer-Dupré	HH Aga Khan IV	3:20.00
2013	Valirann	Christophe Lemaire	Alain de Royer-Dupré	HH Aga Khan IV	3:14.37
2014	Auvray	Grégory Benoist	Élie Lellouche	Augustin-Normand / Vidal	3:16.70
2015	Vazirabad	Christophe Soumillon	Alain de Royer-Dupré	HH Aga Khan IV	3:12.35
2016	Moonshiner (Note: The 2016 & 2017 races were run at Saint-Cloud while Longchamp was closed for redevelopment)	Maxime Guyon	Jean-Pierre Carvalho	Stall Ullman	3:14.79
2017	Darbuzan	Christophe Soumillon	Mikel Delzangles	Zahra Aga Khan	3:18.40
2018	Jackfinbar	Jim Crowley	Harry Dunlop	Haven't A Pot Partnership	3:11.44
2019	Moonlight Spirit	James Doyle	Charlie Appleby	Godolphin	3:14.76
2020	Paix	Christophe Soumillon	Francis-Henri Graffard	Skymarc / Monceaux	3:19.85
2021	Esope	Stéphane Pasquier	Hiroo Shimizu	3S Race Horse Management AG	3:23.23
2022	Master Gatsby	Ioritz Mendizabal	Fabrice Chappet	PG Racing Club	3:13.95
2023	Gallerist	Cristian Demuro	Francis-Henri Graffard	Hollymount Stud France SC	3:20.55
2024	Columbus	Augustin Madamet	Christophe Ferland	Gregor Baum, Ecurie Alag et al	3:21.68
2025	Espoir Avenir	Enzo Corallo	Christophe Ferland	Alain Maubert	3:16.50
2026	Victoire Magique	Cristian Demuro	Amy Murphy	Solario Racing	3:21.54

== Earlier winners ==
- 1865: Tourmalet
- 1866: Etoile Filante
- 1867: Normandie
- 1868: Le Petit Caporal
- 1869: L'Oise
- 1870: Sornette
- 1872: Faublas
- 1873: Franc Tireur
- 1874: Franc Tireur
- 1875: Dictature
- 1876: Chassenon
- 1877: Caen
- 1878: Balagny
- 1880: Castillon
- 1881: Le Destrier
- 1882: Veston
- 1884: Sansonnet
- 1886: Aida
- 1887: Richelieu
- 1888: Avril
- 1892: Amadis
- 1893: Boudoir
- 1895: Jaffa
- 1896: Merlin
- 1898: Elf
- 1899: General Albert
- 1900: Melina
- 1901: Pomona
- 1903: Alençon
- 1905: Rataplan
- 1906: Hilarion
- 1907: Montlieu
- 1908: Biniou
- 1909: Moulins la Marche
- 1910: La Francaise
- 1911: Sablonnet
- 1912: Lahire
- 1913: Carandor
- 1914: Shannon
- 1920: Neomenie
- 1921: Sereska
- 1922: Flechois
- 1923: Flechois
- 1924: Filibert de Savoie
- 1925: Ariel
- 1926: Hohneck
- 1927: Chicaneau
- 1928: Cistercien
- 1929: Le Parquet
- 1930: Picaflor
- 1931: Amfortas
- 1932: Bara
- 1933: Nanaia
- 1934: Trop Presse
- 1935: Fedor
- 1936: Cardon
- 1937: Horncastle
- 1938: Frisquet
- 1939: Tali
- 1940: Ribera
- 1941: Pas un Sou
- 1942: Quicko
- 1951: Coast Guard
- 1954: Vamos
- 1956: Elpenor
- 1959: Etwild
- 1962: Snob
- 1967: Bon Mot
- 1968: Carnaval

== See also ==
- List of French flat horse races
