= Prix Vicomtesse Vigier =

Flat horse race in France

- Class: Group 1
- Location: Longchamp Racecourse; Paris, France
- Inaugurated: 1859
- Race type: Flat / Thoroughbred
- Website: france-galop.com

Race information
- Distance: 3,100 metres (1m 7½f)
- Surface: Turf
- Track: Right-handed
- Qualification: Four-years-old and up
- Weight: 56 kg Allowances; 1½ kg for fillies and mares Penalties; 2 kg for Group 1 winners * 1 kg for Group 2 winners * * since January 1 last year
- Purse: €400,000 (2025); 1st: €74,100

Prix Vicomtesse Vigier
2026
Caballo De Mar	Santorini Star	Al Riffa

Previous years
2025
Candelari	Sevenna's Knight	Presage Nocturne
2024
Sevenna's Knight	Shembala	Double Major
2023
Sober	The Good Man	Big Call
2022
Skazino	Joie De Soir	The Good Man
2021
Skazino	Valia	The Grand Visir

2020-2011
2020
San Huberto	Call The Wind	Get Shirty
2019
Called To The Bar	Way To Paris	Call The Wind
2018
Vazirabad	Marmelo	Mille Et Mille
2017
Vazirabad	Sirius	Travelling Man
2016
Vazirabad	Fly With Me	Manatee
2015
Bathyrhon	Glaring	Mille Et Mille
2014
Fly With Me	Goldtara	Terrubi
2013
Domeside	Les Beaufs	Last Train
2012
Ivory Land	Usuelo	Prairie Star
2011
Brigantin	Dunaden	Marinous

2010–2001
2010
Kite Wood	Kasbah Bliss	Blek
2009
Americain	Pointilliste	Bannaby
2008
Coastal Path	Orion Star	Ponte Tresa
2007
Lord Du Sud	Ponte Tresa	Montare
2006
Shamdala	Montare	Reefscape
2005
Westerner	Allez Olive	Winged D'Argent
2004
Forestier	Westerner	Clear Thinking
2003
Cut Quartz	Morozov	Terrazzo
2002
Wareed	Speedmaster	Crillon
2001
Speedmaster	Polish Summer	Folie Danse

2000–1998
2000
Amilynx	Le Tintoret	Yavana's Pace
1999
Kayf Tara	Tajoun	Katun
1998
Tajoun	Lucky Dream	Windsor Castle

The Prix Vicomtesse Vigier is a Group 1 flat horse race in France open to thoroughbreds aged four years or older. It is run at Longchamp over a distance of 3,100 metres (about 1 mile and 7½ furlongs), and it is scheduled to take place each year in May.

== History ==
The event was established in 1859 and named after the Viscountess Vigier. It was originally the second leg of a pair of races called the Prix Biennal. The first leg, for three-year-olds, was created a year earlier. The version for older horses was initially contested over 3,200 metres. It was cancelled because of the Franco-Prussian War in 1871, and it was cut to 3,000 metres in 1897. It was abandoned throughout World War I, with no running from 1915 to 1918.

Both legs of the Prix Biennal were given a new title, the Prix Jean Prat, in 1940. This was in memory of Jean Prat (1847–1940), a successful racehorse owner and breeder. The older horses' version was held at Maisons-Laffitte from 1943 to 1945, and on the first occasion it was contested over 3,100 metres. It returned to Longchamp in 1946, and its regular distance was extended to 3,100 metres in 1955.

The Prix Jean Prat for older horses was renamed the Prix Vicomtesse Vigier in 1985. This was in honour of Vicomtesse Vigier, Madeleine Double de Saint-Lambert (1869–1970), the niece of Jean Prat, who inherited her uncle's stable upon his death. The version for three-year-olds continued with the title Prix Jean Prat.

The Prix Vicomtesse Vigier used to be held several weeks before the Prix du Cadran, but that race was switched from May to October in 1991. The leading contenders often go on to compete in the latter event, and the last to win both in the same year was Vazirabad in 2017.

== Records ==
Most successful horse (3 wins):

- Vazirabad – 2016, 2017, 2018

Leading jockey (6 wins):

- Yves Saint-Martin – Cirio (1963), Danseur (1967), Zamazaan (1969), Paseo (1970), Recupere (1974), Buckskin (1977)
- Freddy Head – Hallez (1971), Midshipman (1978), Campero (1979), Gold River (1981), Starski (1982), Dadarissime (1993)

Leading trainer (7 wins):

- Alain de Royer-Dupré – Starski (1982) Tajoun (1998), Shamdala (2006), Ivory Land (2012), Vazirabad (2016, 2017, 2018)
- André Fabre - Magwal (1984), Amilynx (2000), Coastal Path (2008), Americain (2009), Brigantin (2011), Sober (2023), Sevenna's Knight (2024)

Leading owner (5 wins):

- Henri Delamarre – Pauvre Here (1861), Angus (1862), Clotaire (1872), Boiard (1874), Clio (1883)
- Marcel Boussac – Marsyas (1944, 1945), Arbar (1948), Marveil (1950), Scratch (1951)
- Aga Khan IV – Tajoun (1998), Shamdala (2006), Vazirabad (2016, 2017, 2018)

== Winners since 1979 ==
Year	Winner	Age	Jockey	Trainer	Owner	Time
1979	Campero	6	Freddy Head	Maurice Zilber	J. Moreno	3:16.80
1980	Hard to Sing	4	Georges Doleuze	Charlie Milbank	N. Lathom-Sharp	3:24.90
1981	Gold River	4	Freddy Head	Alec Head	Jacques Wertheimer	3:39.90
1982	Starski	4	Freddy Head	Alain de Royer-Dupré	Marquesa de Moratalla	3:28.40
1983	Kelbomec	7	Jean-Claude Desaint	J. C. Cunnington	Mrs Jacques Barker	3:37.30
1984	Magwal	5	Alfred Gibert	André Fabre	Mahmoud Fustok	3:17.20
1985	Balitou	6	Éric Legrix	Patrick Biancone	Daniel Wildenstein	3:32.20
1986	Air de Cour	4	Éric Legrix	Patrick Biancone	Daniel Wildenstein	3:42.20
1987	Tale Quale	5	Tony Cruz	Patrick Biancone	Daniel Wildenstein	3:25.70
1988	Royal Gait	5	Alfred Gibert	John Fellows	Manuel Pereira-Arias	3:28.00
1989	Rachmaninov	4	Cash Asmussen	Élie Lellouche	Jean-Claude Abecassis	3:37.30
1990	Turgeon	4	Tony Cruz	Jonathan Pease	George Strawbridge	3:26.30
1991	Turgeon	5	Cash Asmussen	Jonathan Pease	George Strawbridge	3:20.00
1992	Commendable	4	Pat Eddery	Henri-Alex Pantall	Khalid Abdullah	3:23.80
1993	Dadarissime	4	Freddy Head	Georges Bridgland	Sir James Goldsmith	3:20.80
1994	Molesnes	4	Olivier Peslier	Marcel Rolland	Michel Perret	3:27.90
1995	The Little Thief	4	Alain Junk	Eric Danel	George Ohrstrom	3:29.70
1996	Double Eclipse	4	Jason Weaver	Mark Johnston	Middleham Partnership	3:28.20
1997	Stretarez	4	Frédéric Sanchez	Dominique Sépulchre	Jean-Luc Lagardère	3:28.80
1998	Tajoun	4	Gérald Mossé	Alain de Royer-Dupré	HH Aga Khan IV	3:18.50
1999	Kayf Tara	5	Sylvain Guillot	Saeed bin Suroor	Godolphin	3:22.90
2000	Amilynx	4	Olivier Peslier	André Fabre	Jean-Luc Lagardère	3:27.20
2001	Speedmaster	4	Dominique Boeuf	François Doumen	Horst Rapp	3:19.30
2002	Wareed	4	Frankie Dettori	Saeed bin Suroor	Godolphin	3:15.80
2003	Cut Quartz	6	Thierry Jarnet	Richard Gibson	Antoinette Kavanagh	3:32.70
2004	Forestier	4	Christophe Lemaire	Eric Danel	Mrs René J. Wattinne	3:29.90
2005	Westerner	6	Olivier Peslier	Élie Lellouche	Ecurie Wildenstein	3:15.80
2006	Shamdala	4	Christophe Soumillon	Alain de Royer-Dupré	HH Aga Khan IV	3:22.50
2007	Lord du Sud	6	Christophe Lemaire	Jean-Claude Rouget	Béatrice Hermelin	3:33.60
2008	Coastal Path	4	Stéphane Pasquier	André Fabre	Khalid Abdullah	3:18.60
2009	Americain	4	Olivier Peslier	André Fabre	Wertheimer et Frère	3:28.78
2010	Kite Wood	4	Frankie Dettori	Saeed bin Suroor	Godolphin	3:20.00
2011	Brigantin	4	Pierre-Charles Boudot	André Fabre	Team Valor	3:31.60
2012	Ivory Land	5	Stéphane Pasquier	Alain de Royer-Dupré	Eduardo Fierro	3:26.69
2013	Domeside	7	Christophe Soumillon	Mauricio Delcher-Sanchez	Safsaf Canarias Srl	3:27.01
2014	Fly With Me	4	Maxime Guyon	Eric Libaud	Jean Luck	3:32.22
2015	Bathyrhon	5	Maxime Guyon	Pia Brandt	Avaz Ismoilov	3:20.74
2016	Vazirabad (Note: The race took place at Saint-Cloud in 2016 and Chantilly in 2017 while Longchamp was closed for redevelopment)	4	Christophe Soumillon	Alain de Royer-Dupré	Aga Khan IV	3:35.96
2017	Vazirabad	5	Christophe Soumillon	Alain de Royer-Dupré	Aga Khan IV	3:37.11
2018	Vazirabad	6	Christophe Soumillon	Alain de Royer-Dupré	Aga Khan IV	3:14.46
2019	Called To The Bar	5	Theo Bachelot	Pia Brandt	Fair Salinia / Pia Brandt	3:12.23
2020	San Huberto (Note: The 2020 race was run at Chantilly in June due to the COVID-19 pandemic in France)	4	Pierre-Charles Boudot	Fabrice Chappet	OTI Racing	3:10.34
2021	Skazino	5	Mickael Barzalona	Cedric Rossi	La Haras de la Gousserie	3:27.19
2022	Skazino	6	Mickael Barzalona	Richard Chotard	La Haras de la Gousserie	3:22.99
2023	Sober	4	Maxime Guyon	André Fabre	Wertheimer et Frère	3:21.98
2024	Sevenna's Knight	4	Mickael Barzalona	André Fabre	OTI Racing	3:21.15
2025	Candelari	4	Clement Lecoeuvre	Francis-Henri Graffard	Aga Khan Studs SCEA	3:19.09
2026	Caballo De Mar	5	Oisin Murphy	George Scott	Victorious Forever	3:21.11

== Earlier winners ==
- 1859: Tippler
- 1860: Light
- 1861: Pauvre Here
- 1862: Angus
- 1863: Grande Puissance
- 1864: Guillaume le Taciturne
- 1865: Fille de l'Air
- 1866: Fumee
- 1867: Fleurette
- 1868: Nemea
- 1869: Mortemer
- 1870: Cerdagne
- 1871: no race
- 1872: Clotaire
- 1873: Revigny
- 1874: Boiard
- 1875: Bieville
- 1876: Solo
- 1877: Mondaine
- 1878: Jongleur
- 1879: Mourle
- 1880: Vignemale
- 1881: Beauminet / Le Destrier (Note: The 1881 race was a dead-heat and has joint winners)
- 1882: Forum
- 1883: Clio
- 1884: Satory
- 1885: Archiduc
- 1886: Lapin
- 1887: Alger
- 1888: Brisolier
- 1889: Galaor
- 1890: Pourtant
- 1891: Alicante
- 1892: Gouverneur
- 1893: Perdican
- 1894: Lagrange
- 1895: Canigou
- 1896: Quelus
- 1897:
- 1898: Patriarche
- 1899: Riverain
- 1900: Germain
- 1901: Codoman
- 1902: La Camargo
- 1903:
- 1904: Nordenskjold
- 1905: Gouvernant
- 1906: Genial
- 1907: Querido
- 1908: Elysee
- 1909: Sauge Pourpree
- 1910: Oversight
- 1911: Sablonnet
- 1912: Joyeux
- 1913: Predicateur
- 1914: Nimbus
- 1915–18: no race
- 1919: Gave
- 1920: Juveigneur
- 1921: Odol
- 1922: Harpocrate
- 1923: Sens
- 1924: Massine
- 1925: Cadum
- 1926: Tomy
- 1927: Bois Josselyn
- 1928: Sachet
- 1929: Kantar
- 1930: Cabire
- 1931: Amfortas
- 1932: Dark Agnes
- 1933: Gris Perle
- 1934: Casterari
- 1935: Admiral Drake
- 1936: Quorn
- 1937: Fantastic
- 1938: Malkowicze
- 1939: Messines
- 1940: Birikil
- 1941: Maurepas
- 1942: Le Pampre
- 1943: Tornado
- 1944: Marsyas
- 1945: Marsyas
- 1946: Chanteur
- 1947: Souverain
- 1948: Arbar
- 1949: Espace Vital
- 1950: Marveil
- 1951: Scratch
- 1952: Mat de Cocagne
- 1953: Feu du Diable
- 1954: Savoyard
- 1955: Banassa
- 1956: Polar
- 1957: Oroso
- 1958: Vacarme
- 1959: Wallaby
- 1960: Bel Baraka
- 1961: Puissant Chef
- 1962: Taine
- 1963: Cirio
- 1964: Celadon
- 1965: White Label
- 1966: Alyscamps
- 1967: Danseur
- 1968: Pardallo
- 1969: Zamazaan
- 1970: Paseo
- 1971: Hallez
- 1972: Parnell
- 1973: Parnell
- 1974: Recupere
- 1975: Le Bavard
- 1976: Citoyen
- 1977: Buckskin
- 1978: Midshipman

== See also ==
- List of French flat horse races
- Recurring sporting events established in 1859 – this race is included under its original title, Prix Biennal.
