= Marsyas (horse) =

French-bred Thoroughbred racehorse

- Sire: Trimdon
- Grandsire: Son-in-Law
- Dam: Astronomie
- Damsire: Asterus
- Sex: Stallion
- Foaled: 1940
- Country: France
- Colour: Chestnut
- Breeder: Marcel Boussac
- Owner: Marcel Boussac
- Trainer: Charles Semblat
- Record: 27: 17-4-5

Major wins
- Prix Berteux (1943); Prix du Cadran (1944, 1945, 1946, 1947); Prix Kergorlay (1944); Prix Gladiateur (1944); Prix Jean Prat (1944, 1945); White Rose Stakes (1946); Queen Alexandra Stakes (1946); Goodwood Cup (1946); Doncaster Cup (1946); Lowther Stakes (1946)
- Last updated on December 19, 2006

Marsyas (also known as Marsyas II, 1940–30 May 1964) was a French Thoroughbred racehorse and sire. He was the dominant stayer in France in the mid-1940s, winning four consecutive editions of the 4,000 metre Prix du Cadran from 1944 to 1947. He proved equally successful when campaigned in Britain in 1946. After winning seventeen of his twenty-seven races, he was retired to stud where he had limited success as a sire of winners.

== Background ==
Marsyas was a chestnut horse with a narrow white blaze and white socks on his hind legs, bred by his owner Marcel Boussac at his Haras de Fresnay-le-Buffard in Neuvy-au-Houlme in Lower Normandy. He was sired by the British-bred stallion Trimdon, winner of the Ascot Gold Cup in 1931 and 1932. Marsyas's dam was the highly successful broodmare Astronomie, whose other progeny included the undefeated Caracalla, Arbar, and Asmena.

== Racing career ==
Marsyas's early career took place during the Second World War which meant that he was confined to racing in his home country. During his three-year-old season in 1943, France's most important racecourse, Longchamp was closed and many important races were run at alternative venues. He won the Prix Berteux at Maisons-Laffitte and was placed in the Grand Prix de Paris and the Prix Royal Oak, both of which were run at Le Tremblay. In the following season, Marsyas showed much improved form, winning most of France's top long-distance races including the Pix du Cadran at Le Tremblay, Prix Kergorlay (Le Tremblay), Prix Jean Prat (Maisons-Laffitte) and the Prix Gladiateur (Le Tremblay). The last-named race was run over the extreme distance of 6,200 metres (almost four miles). He finished unplaced for the only time in his career in the 1944 Prix de l'Arc de Triomphe over 2,400 metres. In 1945 Marsyas won the Prix Jean Prat at Maisons-Laffitte and Prix du Cadran at Le Tremblay.

In 1946, Marysas was beaten by Chanteur in the Prix Jean Prat, but then reversed the form with that horse to win his third Prix du Cadran. In May of that year he raced outside France for the first time when he won the White Rose Stakes at Hurst Park and was part of an exceptionally strong team of French stayers sent to Royal Ascot in June. When racing in Britain, he was known as Marysas II. He bypassed the Ascot Gold Cup, in which his younger brother Caracalla defeated Chanteur, but won the longest race of the meeting, the Queen Alexandra Stakes over two and three-quarter miles. On subsequent visits to England that year he won the Goodwood Cup and the Doncaster Cup. In October at Newmarket he moved down in distance and won the Lowther Stakes over one and a half miles, beating the King's colt Rising Light. Less than a week after this win, Marsyas competed in the Jockey Club Cup where he finished third to Felix. In his final season, Marsyas won the Prix du Cadran for the fourth time at the reopened Longchamp Racecourse, beating Souverain by four lengths.

== Assessment ==
Despite being the outstanding stayer in Europe in 1947, Marsyas was not included by the Timeform organisation in their annual Racehorses of 1947, as he did not compete in Britain or Ireland that season. Souverain, who had been well beaten by Marsyas in the Prix du Cadran, was Timeform's top-rated older horse, with a rating of 135.

In their book A Century of Champions, based on a modified version of the Timeform system, John Randall and Tony Morris rated Marsyas the fourteenth best French-trained horse of the 20th century. Among horses foaled in 1940, he was rated second behind the American champion Count Fleet.

Phil Bull described Marsyas as "a phenomenon among racehorses... If there is such a thing as a racehorse who stays forever, it is he."

== Stud record ==
Marsyas was retired to become a breeding stallion at his owner's stud in Normandy. He met with some success but none of his progeny achieved his own level of racing success. The best of his progeny included Macip who won the Prix Royal Oak in 1955 and the Ascot Gold Cup in 1956, and Marsyad, who won the Dewhurst Stakes. Marsyas died on May 30, 1964.

== Sire line tree ==
- Marsyas
  - Marsyad
  - Eastern Venture
    - Woodland Venture
  - Macip

== Pedigree ==
Pedigree of Marsyas (FR), chestnut stallion 1940
Sire Trimdon (GB)	Son-in-Law (GB)	Dark Ronald	Bay Ronald*
Sire Trimdon (GB)	Son-in-Law (GB)	Dark Ronald	Darkie
Sire Trimdon (GB)	Son-in-Law (GB)	Mother-in-Law	Matchmaker
Sire Trimdon (GB)	Son-in-Law (GB)	Mother-in-Law	Be Cannie
Sire Trimdon (GB)	Trimestral (GB)	William the Third	St Simon
Sire Trimdon (GB)	Trimestral (GB)	William the Third	Gravity
Sire Trimdon (GB)	Trimestral (GB)	Mistrella	Cyllene
Sire Trimdon (GB)	Trimestral (GB)	Mistrella	Ark Royal
Dam Astronomie (FR)	Asterus (FR)	Teddy	Ajax
Dam Astronomie (FR)	Asterus (FR)	Teddy	Rondeau*
Dam Astronomie (FR)	Asterus (FR)	Astrella	Verdun
Dam Astronomie (FR)	Asterus (FR)	Astrella	Saint Astra
Dam Astronomie (FR)	Likka (FR)	Sardanapale	Prestige
Dam Astronomie (FR)	Likka (FR)	Sardanapale	Gemma
Dam Astronomie (FR)	Likka (FR)	Diane Mallory	Nimbus
Dam Astronomie (FR)	Likka (FR)	Diane Mallory	Ferula (Family: 9-e)

* Marsyas is inbred 4S x 5D to the stallion Bay Ronald, meaning that he appears fourth generation on the sire side of his pedigree, and fifth generation (via Rondeau) on the dam side of his pedigree.
