= Raintrap =

British Thoroughbred racehorse

- Sire: Rainbow Quest
- Grandsire: Blushing Groom
- Dam: Suntrap
- Damsire: Roberto
- Sex: Stallion
- Foaled: 1990
- Country: Great Britain
- Colour: Chestnut
- Breeder: Juddmonte Farms
- Owner: Khalid Abdullah
- Trainer: André Fabre (France); Robert J. Frankel (USA)
- Record: 28: 9-2-2
- Earnings: US$$1,283,707 (equivalent)

Major wins
- Prix Berteux (1993); Prix Royal-Oak (1993); Prix Kergorlay (1993); Canadian International Stakes (1994); San Juan Capistrano Handicap (1996)

Raintrap (foaled 1990 in Great Britain) is a British Thoroughbred racehorse and sire.

== Background ==
Raintrap was a chestnut horse bred in England by his owner Khalid Abdullah's Juddmonte Farms. He was sired by Rainbow Quest who won the Prix de l'Arc de Triomphe before becoming a very successful breeding stallion. Rainbow Quest's other progeny included Quest for Fame, Saumarez, Sunshack, Nedawi, Armiger, Spectrum and Millenary. Sunshack's dam Suntrap was a successful racemare who won three minor races and finished third in both the Prix d'Aumale and the Lupe Stakes. As a broodmare went on to produce Raintrap's full-brother Sunshack. Raintrap was sent into training with André Fabre in France.

== Racing career ==
Raintrap made his racing debut on April 24, 1993, with a second-place finish in a three-horse field in the Prix Le Pacha at Saint-Cloud Racecourse. He then won three races in a row: the Prix Nimbus, the G3 Prix Berteux, and the G2 Prix Kergorlay. In October at Longchamp Racecourse in Paris, he ran second in the Prix de Lutèce, then won the G1 Prix Royal Oak.

Racing at age four, Raintrap was fourth in England's Ascot Gold Cup, then back in France won the Prix Du Carrousel at Evry. On October 16, 1994, he won the most important race of his career at Woodbine Racetrack in Toronto, Canada. Earning the second win for trainer André Fabre in the Canadian International Stakes, Raintrap captured the prestigious race in a course record time of 2:25.6 for 1½ miles. Turned over by his owner to American trainer Bobby Frankel, three weeks later on November 5, Raintrap finished tenth to winner Tikkanen in the November 5, 1994, Breeders' Cup Turf, then was shipped to Tokyo Racecourse in Japan, where on November 27 he ran thirteenth and last to Marvelous Crown in the Japan Cup.

As a five-year-old, Raintrap was third in the Carleton F. Burke Handicap at Santa Anita Park in Arcadia, California. At age six, he won Santa Anita's Cedar Key Stakes and the 1¾ mile San Juan Capistrano Handicap. Later that year at Chicago's Arlington Park, he was second by a nose in the Stars and Stripes Handicap and fourth in the Arlington Handicap. In September 1996, he finished eighth and last in the Man o' War Stakes at Belmont Park in Elmont, New York.

== Stud record ==
Retired to stud in 1997, Raintrap has not been successful as a sire, although he has sired some winners over jumps.

== Pedigree ==
Pedigree of Raintrap (GB), chestnut stallion, 1990
Sire Rainbow Quest (USA) 1981	Blushing Groom (FR); 1974	Red God	Nasrullah
Sire Rainbow Quest (USA) 1981	Blushing Groom (FR); 1974	Red God	Spring Run
Sire Rainbow Quest (USA) 1981	Blushing Groom (FR); 1974	Runaway Bride	Wild Risk
Sire Rainbow Quest (USA) 1981	Blushing Groom (FR); 1974	Runaway Bride	Aimee
Sire Rainbow Quest (USA) 1981	I Will Follow (USA); 1975	Herbager	Vandale
Sire Rainbow Quest (USA) 1981	I Will Follow (USA); 1975	Herbager	Flagette
Sire Rainbow Quest (USA) 1981	I Will Follow (USA); 1975	Where You Lead	Raise a Native
Sire Rainbow Quest (USA) 1981	I Will Follow (USA); 1975	Where You Lead	Noblesse
Dam Suntrap (USA) 1983	Roberto (USA); 1969	Hail To Reason	Turn-To
Dam Suntrap (USA) 1983	Roberto (USA); 1969	Hail To Reason	Nothirdchance
Dam Suntrap (USA) 1983	Roberto (USA); 1969	Bramalea	Nashua
Dam Suntrap (USA) 1983	Roberto (USA); 1969	Bramalea	Rarelea
Dam Suntrap (USA) 1983	Sunny Bay (USA); 1975	Northern Bay	Northern Dancer
Dam Suntrap (USA) 1983	Sunny Bay (USA); 1975	Northern Bay	Wendasy
Dam Suntrap (USA) 1983	Sunny Bay (USA); 1975	Staunch Lady	Staunchness
Dam Suntrap (USA) 1983	Sunny Bay (USA); 1975	Staunch Lady	Fee Fee Girl (Family: 1-n)
