= Prix Biennal =

Prix Biennal may refer to:

- Prix Biennal I, a horse race in Chantilly, France, currently titled the Prix Jean Prat
- Prix Biennal II, a horse race in Paris, France, currently titled the Prix Vicomtesse Vigier
