= Vazirabad (horse) =

French Thoroughbred racehorse

- Sire: Manduro
- Grandsire: Monsun
- Dam: Visorama
- Damsire: Linamix
- Sex: Gelding
- Foaled: 8 March 2012
- Country: France
- Colour: Grey
- Breeder: Aga Khan IV
- Owner: Aga Khan IV
- Trainer: Alain de Royer-Dupré
- Record: 23: 15-6-0
- Earnings: £2,465,935

Major wins
- Prix de Lutèce (2015); Prix Chaudenay (2015); Prix Royal-Oak (2015, 2016); Dubai Gold Cup (2016, 2017, 2018); Prix Vicomtesse Vigier (2016, 2017, 2018); Prix Gladiateur (2016, 2017); Prix du Cadran (2017)

Vazirabad (foaled 8 March 2012) is a French Thoroughbred racehorse. He is a specialist stayer who has shown his best form over extended distances. He was unraced as a juvenile but made a major impact as a three-year-old in 2015 when he won the Prix de Lutèce, Prix Chaudenay and Prix Royal-Oak and was rated among the top 50 racehorses in the world. In the following year he won the Dubai Gold Cup, Prix Vicomtesse Vigier, Prix Gladiateur and a second Prix Royal-Oak. As a five-year-old he repeated his victories in the Dubai Gold Cup, Prix Vicomtesse Vigier and Prix Gladiateur as well as taking the Prix du Cadran. In 2018 he recorded further wins in both the Dubai Gold Cup and Prix Vicomtesse Vigier.

== Background ==
Vazirabad was bred in France by his owner, Aga Khan IV. He was sent into training with Alain de Royer-Dupré in France and was gelded before the start of his racing career. He was initially described as being bay or brown but it eventually became clear that he was a grey horse whose true colour had taken time to express itself. Vazirabad was ridden in most of his races by Christophe Soumillon.

He was one of the best horses sired by Manduro, a German-bred stallion who was rated the best racehorse in the world in 2007, a year which saw him win the Prix d'Ispahan, Prince of Wales's Stakes and Prix Jacques Le Marois. Vazirabad's dam Visorama was a half-sister to Varenar (Prix de la Forêt) and Visindar (Prix Greffulhe) as well as being a high-class racemare in her own right who won the Prix de Flore and finished third in the Grand Prix de Saint-Cloud. She was descended from the American mare Continue (foaled 1958) who was the female-line ancestor of Swale, Shadeed and Forty Niner.

== Racing career ==
=== 2015: three-year-old season ===
Vazirabad began his racing career by running sixth in a maiden race over 2200 metres at Longchamp Racecourse on 19 May and then finished second over 3000 metres at Dieppe a month later. Over the same course and distance on 18 July he started the 0.7/1 favourite for a maiden and recorded his first success as he won by one and a half lengths from eight opponents. At Deauville Racecourse on 4 August he won again, taking a minor event by three quarters of a length from the favourite Launched. The gelding was then stepped up in class for the Group 3 Prix de Lutèce over 3000 metres at Longchamp on 6 September and started the 3/1 second favourite behind the Godolphin runner Big Blue. After racing at the rear of the field he moved up on the outside in the straight, took the lead 200 metres from the finish and won "a shade cosily" by one and a half lengths from Big Blue.

Four weeks after his win in the Prix de Lutèce, Vazirabad was moved up in class again to contest the Group 2 Prix Chaudenay over the same course and distance. Starting the odds-on favourite he took the lead 400 metres out and won "comfortably" by three lengths from Tiberian. Longchamp racecourse was then closed for redevelopment and for the next two years races traditionally run at the track were moved to other venues. On 25 October the gelding was matched against older horses for the first time in the Group 1 Prix Royal-Oak over 3100 metres at Saint-Cloud Racecourse and started favourite ahead of twelve opponents including Manatee (Grand Prix de Chantilly), Alex My Boy (Prix Kergorlay), Siljan's Saga (Grand Prix de Deauville), Mille Et Mille (Prix du Cadran) and Cirrus des Aigles. After being restrained by Soumillon in the early stages as Mille Et Mille set the pace he launched a sustained challenge in the last 500 metres. He took the lead 100 metres from the finish and won by a length from Siljan's Saga with a gap of five lengths back to Mille Et Mille in third.

In the 2015 World's Best Racehorse Rankings Vazirabad was given a rating of 120, making him the 42nd best racehorse in the world.

=== 2016: four-year-old season ===
For his first appearance of 2016, Vazirabad was sent to the United Arab Emirates for the Dubai Gold Cup over 3200 metres at Meydan Racecourse on 26 March. Starting the 5/4 favourite he raced towards the rear before taking the lead in the straight and won by a neck from Big Orange. On his return to Europe the gelding started the 2/7 favourite for the Prix Vicomtesse Vigier at Saint-Cloud on 29 May and won by three quarters of a length from Fly With Me after taking the lead in the last 100 metres. On 3 July the gelding was dropped back in trip for the Grand Prix de Saint-Cloud for which he started favourite but came home seventh, two and a half lengths behind the winner Silverwave after being outpaced in the closing stages.

After a break of over two months, Vazirabad started the 4/9 favourite for the Prix Gladiateur at Chantilly Racecourse on 11 September. He came from the rear of the field on the final turn to take the lead 200 metres and held off the challenge of the five-year-old Nahual (to whom he was conceding nine pounds) by a short neck. Three weeks later at the same track he started favourite for the Prix du Cadran over 2500 metres but after taking the lead in the straight he was caught in the last 50 metres and beaten a short neck by the British-trained gelding Quest For More. On 23 October at Saint-Cloud Vazirabad attempted to repeat his 2015 success in the Prix Royal-Oak and was made the 13/8 favourite ahead of Siljan's Saga. The other thirteen runners included Mille Et Mille, Sky Hunter (Dubai City of Gold), Pallasator (Doncaster Cup) and Candarliya (Prix Maurice de Nieuil). After being restrained towards the rear as usual, Vazirabad move up to join the leaders in the straight went to the front 200 metres from the finish and won by one and three quarter lengths from the filly Endless Time despite being eased down by Soumillon in the final strides. Royer-Dupre commented "everyone saw the real Vazirabad today. He won like a real nice horse and showed his turn of foot".

In the 2016 World's Best Racehorse Rankings Vazirabad was given a rating of 117, making him the 110th best racehorse in the world.

=== 2017: five-year-old season ===
As in the previous year, Vazirabad began his 2017 at Meydan Racecourse in Dubai, finishing second to Beautiful Romance in the Group 3 Nad Al Sheba Trophy on his seasonal debut on 23 February. He faced Beautiful Romance again on 25 March as he attempted to win his second Dubai Gold Cup against a field which also included Quest For More, Big Orange, Heartbreak City (Ebor Handicap) and Sheikhzayedroad (British Champions Long Distance Cup). He produced his customary late run in the straight caught Beautiful Romance in the final strides and won by a neck. Only two horses opposed Vazirabad in the Prix Vicomtesse Vigier at Chantilly in May and he won by a short neck from the German challenger Sirius after being forced to make the running for most of the way.

Vazirabad repeated his 2016 schedule in the autumn of 2017 as he returned from a lengthy absence to contest the Prix Gladiateur Chantilly on 10 September. Starting the 9/10 favourite he took the lead 200 metres out and won by three quarters of a length from Holdthasigreen with a gap of seven lengths back to the other six runners. Three weeks later the gelding made his second attempt to win the Prix du Cadran and started the 1/6 favourite against five opponents including Mille Et Mille and High Jinx (winner of the race in 2014). Vazirabad overtook the front-running Mille Et Mille 150 metres out and held off a rally from his old rival to win by half a length with the pair finishing seven lengths in front of the third placed Trip To Rhodos. Royer-Dupre was not entirely satisfied, commenting "He won, but I don’t think that we saw Vazirabad at his best today. He was perhaps moving a little less well than usual". On 22 October the gelding attempted to win a third Prix Royal Oak, but despite starting the 8/15 favourite he was beaten into second place by the three-year-old colt Ice Breeze.

In the 2017 World's Best Racehorse Rankings Vazirabad was given a rating of 117, making him the 129th best racehorse in the world.

=== 2018: six-year-old season ===
Vazirabad returned to Dubai for his first two races of 2018 beginning his campaign by finishing second to Rare Rhythm in the Nad Al Sheba Trophy at Meydan on 1 March. Thirty days later the gelding started the 6/4 favourite when he attempted to win a third Dubai Gold Cup. His opponents on this occasion included Rare Rhythm, Big Orange and Sheikhzayedroad. After racing towards the rear of the sixteen-runner field the gelding took the lead 200 metres from the finish and won "comfotably" by a length from Sheikhzayedroad. Soumillon commented "My horse saw the horses in front of him, and he just wants to catch them" while Royer-Dupre explained "When you come every year to Dubai, you learn what you have to do because it's very hot, and you have to not train them too much. You have to know the place".

At the now re-opened Longchamp Racecourse on 27 May, the gelding was made the 6/5 favourite ahead of Ice Breeze in the Prix Vicomtesse Vigier. He was restrained towards the rear by Soumillon before producing his customary late run and won by a neck from the British-trained outsider Marmelo.

On 21 June Vazirabad raced in England for the first time when he started the 9/2 third choice in the betting for the Gold Cup over two and a half miles at Royal Ascot. Restrained by Soumillon as usual in the early stages he joined the leaders in the straight and finished second, three quarters of a length behind Stradivarius with Torcedor taking third ahead of Order of St George.

A tendon injury kept the gelding off the track for the rest of 2018. He remained in training as a seven-year-old but was unable to race again and his retirement was announced in September 2019.

== Pedigree ==
Pedigree of Vazirabad (FR), Grey gelding, 2012
Sire Manduro (GER) 2002	Monsun; 1990	Konigsstuhl	Dschingis Khan*
Sire Manduro (GER) 2002	Monsun; 1990	Konigsstuhl	Konigskronung
Sire Manduro (GER) 2002	Monsun; 1990	Mosella	Surumu
Sire Manduro (GER) 2002	Monsun; 1990	Mosella	Monasia
Sire Manduro (GER) 2002	Mandellicht (IRE); 1994	Be My Guest (USA)	Northern Dancer (CAN)
Sire Manduro (GER) 2002	Mandellicht (IRE); 1994	Be My Guest (USA)	What A Treat
Sire Manduro (GER) 2002	Mandellicht (IRE); 1994	Mandelauge (GER)	Elektrant*
Sire Manduro (GER) 2002	Mandellicht (IRE); 1994	Mandelauge (GER)	Mandriale
Dam Visorama (IRE) 2000	Linamix (FR); 1987	Mendez	Bellypha (IRE)
Dam Visorama (IRE) 2000	Linamix (FR); 1987	Mendez	Miss Carina
Dam Visorama (IRE) 2000	Linamix (FR); 1987	Lunadix	Breton (GB)
Dam Visorama (IRE) 2000	Linamix (FR); 1987	Lunadix	Lutine (GB)
Dam Visorama (IRE) 2000	Visor (USA); 1989	Mr Prospector	Raise a Native
Dam Visorama (IRE) 2000	Visor (USA); 1989	Mr Prospector	Gold Digger
Dam Visorama (IRE) 2000	Visor (USA); 1989	Look	Spectacular Bid
Dam Visorama (IRE) 2000	Visor (USA); 1989	Look	Tuerta (family: 1-n)

* Vazirabad is inbred 4S x 5S to the stallion Dschingis Khan, meaning that he appears fourth generation and fifth generation (via Elektrant) on the sire side of his pedigree.
