= Technician (horse) =

Irish-bred Thoroughbred racehorse

- Sire: Mastercraftsman
- Grandsire: Danehill Dancer
- Dam: Arosa
- Damsire: Sadler's Wells
- Sex: Stallion
- Foaled: 20 January 2016
- Country: Ireland
- Colour: Grey
- Breeder: Barronstown Stud
- Owner: David Caddy; Team Valor 1
- Trainer: Martyn Meade
- Record: 11: 5-1-1
- Earnings: £381,508

Major wins
- Prix Ridgway (2019); Geoffrey Freer Stakes (2019); Prix Chaudenay (2019); Prix Royal Oak (2019)

Technician (foaled 20 January 2016) is an Irish-bred, British-trained Thoroughbred racehorse best known for his performances over extended distances. After finishing third on his only run as a juvenile in 2018 he developed into a top-class stayer in the following year, winning five races including the Geoffrey Freer Stakes, Prix Chaudenay and Prix Royal Oak.

== Background ==
Technician is a grey stallion (initially classified as chestnut) bred in Ireland by the County Wicklow-based Barronstown Stud. In September 2017 the yearling was consigned to the Goffs Orby Sale and was bought for €40,000 by the bloodstock agent Dermot Farrington. The colt entered the ownership of David Caddy and was sent into training with Martyn Meade at the Manton Estate near Manton, Wiltshire.

His sire Mastercraftsman, from whom he inherited his colour, was a top class performer whose wins included the Phoenix Stakes, National Stakes, Irish 2000 Guineas and St. James's Palace Stakes. As a breeding stallion, his other offspring include Kingston Hill, Alpha Centauri and The Grey Gatsby. Technician's dam Arosa showed modest racing ability, winning one minor race from six attempts. Her dam Sharata was an unraced half-sister to Shahrastani.

== Racing career ==
=== 2018: two-year-old season ===
Technician's first race was a maiden over eight and a half furlongs at Nottingham Racecourse on 7 November in which he was ridden by Rob Hornby and started at odds of 6/1 in a thirteen-runner field. Racing on good to soft ground he recovered from a slow start to obtain a good racing position but was unable to accelerate in the closing stages and came home third behind Space Blues and Private Secretary beaten just over seven lengths by the winner.

=== 2019: three-year-old season ===
==== Spring ====
On his first appearance as a three-year-old Technician was partnered by Oisin Murphy on 5 April when he started 11/8 favourite for a minor event over 1 1/2 miles at Leicester Racecourse and recorded his first success as he went to the front soon after the start and drew away in the closing stages to come home three and a quarter lengths clear of the Mark Johnston-trained Themaxwecan with a gap of eight lengths back to the other four runners. After his win at Leicester the colt was purchased privately by the American syndicate Team Valor.

On his first two starts for his new owners Technician ran in trial races for the Epsom Derby. On 26 April he was stepped up to Group 3 class to contest the Sandown Classic Trial and ran second to Bangkok, finishing strongly after being repeatedly denied a clear run in the last quarter mile. Twelve days later at Chester Racecourse he started joint-favourite for the Chester Vase but appeared unsuited by the sharply turning track and came home fifth, more than fourteen lengths by the winner Sir Dragonet.

==== Summer ====
Technician was sent to France on 13 June and started the 3.2/1 third choice in a five-runner field for the Listed Prix Ridgway over 2000 metres at Longchamp Racecourse. With Murphy in the saddle he led for most of the way and after being headed by the favourite Battle of Toro 200 metres from the finish he rallied to regain the advantage in the closing stages and won by a short neck.

On 1 August at Goodwood Racecourse the colt made no impact in the Group 3 Gordon Stakes, coming home sixth of the nine runners behind Nayef Road. Sixteen days after his defeat at Goodwood, Technician was matched against older horses for the first time when he contested the Geoffrey Freer Stakes over 13 1/2 furlongs on soft ground at Newbury Racecourse and started the 10/1 outsider of the five contenders. Ridden by Hornby, Technician stayed on strongly in the last quarter mile, overtook the favourite Morando inside the final furlong and won by three quarters of a length. Martyn Meade's son and assistant trainer Freddie commented "He's been a funny horse. You have a short amount of time to work these horses out and he's only had six runs. A galloping track and a bit of juice in the ground, and he just keeps giving and giving. You need to ask him to give, he doesn’t give it to you without asking. He's good like that, which means hopefully he's got a bit of longevity".

==== Autumn ====
In the 243rd running of the St Leger Stakes on good to firm ground over 1 mile 6 furlongs on 14 September at Doncaster Racecourse Technician started at odds of 20/1 and never looked likely to win, finishing sixth of the eight runners behind Logician. On 5 October Technician was sent to France for a second time and went off at odds of 6.9/1 for the Group 2 Prix de Chaudenay over 3000 metres on very soft ground at Longchamp. The Prix de Lutèce winner Moonlight Spirit started favourite while the other eight contenders included Dashing Willoughby (Queen's Vase) and Nayef Road. After being restrained in the early stages by Pierre-Charles Boudot, who was riding the colt for the first time, Technician produced a sustained run in the straight to overtake the front-running Moonlight Spirit in the final 100 metres and win by three quarters of a length. After the race Freddie Mead said "Technician is a good horse but last time in the St Leger, the ground was too firm. Today, the ground made the difference. On a soft track, he was more relaxed and displayed his great acceleration."

Three weeks Boudot took the ride again when the colt returned to Longchamp for the Group 1 Prix Royal Oak over 3100 metres on heavy ground and started the 2.4/1 second favourite behind the five-year-old gelding Call The Wind (2018 Prix du Cadran). The other four runners were Holdthasigreen (winner of the race in 2018), Lah Ti Dar (runner-up in the 2018 St Leger), Way To Paris (Prix Maurice de Nieuil) and the Czech-trained outsider Iskanderhon. After racing in mid-division Technician made progress in the straight, took the lead from Holdthasigreen 200 metres out and held off the challenge of Call The Wind to win by one and a quarter lengths. Freddie Meade commented "He's a lovely stayer. We'll find out as we go along what he can do, but he's done enough as a three-year-old and he'll have a well-deserved rest. We'll make a plan through the winter and dream about what we can do from there."

=== 2020: four-year-old season ===
The flat racing season in Britain and Ireland was restructured as a result of the COVID-19 pandemic and Technician did not reappear until 18 June when he started the 4/1 second favourite for the Gold Cup over 2 1/2 miles at Royal Ascot. Ridden by Oisin Murphy he never looked likely to win and came home seventh of the eight runners behind Stradivarius. He did not race again in 2020.

== Pedigree ==
Pedigree of Technician (IRE), grey colt, 2016
Sire Mastercraftsman (IRE) 2006	Danehill Dancer (IRE); 1993	Danehill (USA)	Danzig
Sire Mastercraftsman (IRE) 2006	Danehill Dancer (IRE); 1993	Danehill (USA)	Razyana
Sire Mastercraftsman (IRE) 2006	Danehill Dancer (IRE); 1993	Mira Adonde (USA)	Sharpen Up (GB)
Sire Mastercraftsman (IRE) 2006	Danehill Dancer (IRE); 1993	Mira Adonde (USA)	Lettre d'Amour
Sire Mastercraftsman (IRE) 2006	Starlight Dreams (USA); 1995	Black Tie Affair (IRE)	Miswaki (USA)
Sire Mastercraftsman (IRE) 2006	Starlight Dreams (USA); 1995	Black Tie Affair (IRE)	Hat Tab Girl (USA)
Sire Mastercraftsman (IRE) 2006	Starlight Dreams (USA); 1995	Reves Celestes	Lyphard
Sire Mastercraftsman (IRE) 2006	Starlight Dreams (USA); 1995	Reves Celestes	Tobira Celeste
Dam Arosa (IRE) 2003	Sadler's Wells (USA); 1981	Northern Dancer (CAN)	Nearctic
Dam Arosa (IRE) 2003	Sadler's Wells (USA); 1981	Northern Dancer (CAN)	Natalma (USA)
Dam Arosa (IRE) 2003	Sadler's Wells (USA); 1981	Fairy Bridge	Bold Reason
Dam Arosa (IRE) 2003	Sadler's Wells (USA); 1981	Fairy Bridge	Special
Dam Arosa (IRE) 2003	Sharata (IRE); 1988	Darshaan (GB)	Shirley Heights
Dam Arosa (IRE) 2003	Sharata (IRE); 1988	Darshaan (GB)	Delsy (FR)
Dam Arosa (IRE) 2003	Sharata (IRE); 1988	Shademah	Thatch (USA)
Dam Arosa (IRE) 2003	Sharata (IRE); 1988	Shademah	Shamim (Family: 3-o)
