= Souverain =

French-bred Thoroughbred racehorse

- Sire: Maravedis
- Grandsire: Massine
- Dam: Jolie Reine
- Damsire: Palais Royal
- Sex: Stallion
- Foaled: 1943
- Country: France
- Colour: Bay
- Breeder: F. R. Schmitt
- Owner: F. R. Schmitt
- Trainer: Henri Delavaud
- Record: 11:8-1-2

Major wins
- Prix Jean Prat (three-year-olds) (1946); Grand Prix de Paris (1946); Prix Royal Oak (1946); King George VI Stakes (1946); Prix Jean Prat (four-year-olds) (1947); Ascot Gold Cup (1947); Prix Kergorlay (1947)

Awards
- Timeform top-rated older horse (1947); Timeform rating 135

Souverain (foaled 1943) was a French Thoroughbred racehorse and sire. After winning his only race in 1945 he emerged as the leading European three-year-old of 1946 when his wins included the Grand Prix de Paris and the Prix Royal Oak in France and the King George VI Stakes in Britain. His success in the last race, in which he decisively defeated the British champion Airborne provoked widespread debate in Europe concerning the superiority of French horses in long-distance events. As a four-year-old, Souverain added a victory in Britain's most valuable race, the Ascot Gold Cup. At the end of 1947 he was retired to stud where he had limited success as a sire of winners.

== Background ==
Souverain was a bay horse with a narrow white blaze and four white socks bred by his owner F. R. Schmitt. He was not an attractive colt, being described as a wall-eyed "ugly duckling" by a British observer. Souverain was sired by Maravedis, a horse which won the Prix Hocquart and Prix Greffulhe out of a mare named Jolie Reine. Apart from Souverain, Maravedis's most notable offspring were the Prix Royal Oak winner Samaritain and the Champion Hurdle winner Clair Soleil. As a descendant of the British broodmare Orris, Jolie Reine came from the same branch of Thoroughbred Family 23 as the 1949 Kentucky Derby winner Ponder. The colt was trained at Maisons-Laffitte by Henri Delavaud.

== Racing career ==
=== 1945: two-year-old season ===
Souverain ran only once as a two-year-old, winning a race over 1800 metres (nine furlongs).

=== 1946: three-year-old season ===
Souverain recorded his first important success when he won the three-year-old version of the Prix Jean Prat over 2000 metres at Longchamp Racecourse in April. A month later he finished third to Adrar in the 2400 metre Prix Hocquart. The colt returned to Longchamp in July for the 3000 metre Grand Prix de Paris for which he started a 53.5/1 outsider. Ridden by Marcel Lollierou he won by a short head from the Prix du Jockey Club winner Prince Chevalier. The result was decided by a photo finish, then a relatively new technology which was not introduced to Britain until 1947. In October, Souverain recorded another important success when he defeated Prince Chevalier in "storming fashion" in the Prix Royal Oak, the French equivalent of Britain's St Leger Stakes.

On his final start of the season he was sent to England for the inaugural King George VI Stakes over two miles at Ascot where he was matched against The Derby winner Airborne and the Irish Derby winner Bright News. The race carried prize money of £5,000 and was billed as the "international championship" for three-year-olds. Ridden as usual by Lollierou, Souverain "shot clear" of the field in the straight and won easily by five lengths from Bright News, with Airborne, the favourite, in third. The success of Souverain reportedly "shattered" the belief of British breeders in the superiority of their staying horses. Among the theories advanced to explain his win was the supposedly unlimited supply of milk and German oats provided to French horses at the end of the Second World War. Lord Brabazon, writing in Nature blamed bad tactics by British jockeys who tended to restrain their mounts before accelerating in the closing stages and was supported by the physiologist Archibald Hill who argued that horses performed better when they ran at a uniform speed. French experts however, pointed to the tendency of British breeders to undervalue stamina in pedigrees and place undue emphasis on sprinting and two-year-old races.

By the end of the season, Souverain was regarded as Europe's Champion three-year-old and valued by his owners at the "unheard of" sum of £160,000. Late in 1946, the American magazine Time proposed an international championship race in which Souverain and the Australian champion Bernborough would be matched against leading American runner Stymie, but the event never came to fruition.

=== 1947: four-year-old season ===
As a four-year-old, Souverain won the older horses' version of the Prix Jean Prat (the race now called the Prix Vicomtesse Vigier) at Longchamp in May. Later that month he ran in the 4000 metre Prix du Cadran but was decisively beaten by the seven-year-old Marsyas who was winning the race for the fourth time. In June, he was sent to race in Britain for the second time, when he contested the Gold Cup over two and a half miles at Royal Ascot. He started at odds of 6/4 and won by four lengths from the other French challenger Chanteur, who had been made odds-on favourite. The prize money of £11,316 made the race the most valuable ever run in Britain up to that time.

Souverain returned to France in August and recorded his last important success when he won the Prix Kergorlay at Deauville Racecourse. In autumn 1947, Souverain contracted a respiratory infection and was retired from racing.

== Assessment ==
The independent Timeform organisation assigned a rating of 135 to Souverain in 1947 (the first year for which annual ratings were published), making him the equal of Chanteur as the highest-rated older horse in Europe. Marsyas, who did not race in Britain that year, was not included in the ratings.

In their book A Century of Champions, based on a modified version of the Timeform system, John Randall and Tony Morris rated Souverain the twenty-first best French-trained horse of the 20th century and the second-best horse foaled in 1943, behind Sayani and ahead of Assault.

== Stud record ==
Souverain was retired to stand as a stallion in France, although he was briefly moved to Britain in the mid-1950s. He was not considered a success as a sire of winners although he did sire Scot, a colt which won the Prix Royal Oak in 1957.

== Pedigree ==
Pedigree of Souverain (FR), bay stallion, 1943
Sire Maravedis (FR)	Massine (FR)	Consols	Doricles
Sire Maravedis (FR)	Massine (FR)	Consols	Console
Sire Maravedis (FR)	Massine (FR)	Mauri	Ajax*
Sire Maravedis (FR)	Massine (FR)	Mauri	La Camargo
Sire Maravedis (FR)	Argentee (FR)	As d'Atout	Macdonald
Sire Maravedis (FR)	Argentee (FR)	As d'Atout	Anastasie
Sire Maravedis (FR)	Argentee (FR)	Azalee	Ajax*
Sire Maravedis (FR)	Argentee (FR)	Azalee	Lygie
Dam Jolie Reine (FR)	Palais Royal (FR)	Bruleur	Chouberski
Dam Jolie Reine (FR)	Palais Royal (FR)	Bruleur	Basse Terre
Dam Jolie Reine (FR)	Palais Royal (FR)	Puntarenas	Maintenon
Dam Jolie Reine (FR)	Palais Royal (FR)	Puntarenas	Punta Gorda
Dam Jolie Reine (FR)	Dolores (GB)	Diligence	Hurry On
Dam Jolie Reine (FR)	Dolores (GB)	Diligence	Ecurie
Dam Jolie Reine (FR)	Dolores (GB)	Orris	Orby
Dam Jolie Reine (FR)	Dolores (GB)	Orris	Aroon (Family: 23)

* Souverain is inbred 4S x 4S to the stallion Ajax, meaning that he appears fourth generation twice on the sire side of his pedigree.
