= Turgeon (horse) =

American-bred Thoroughbred racehorse

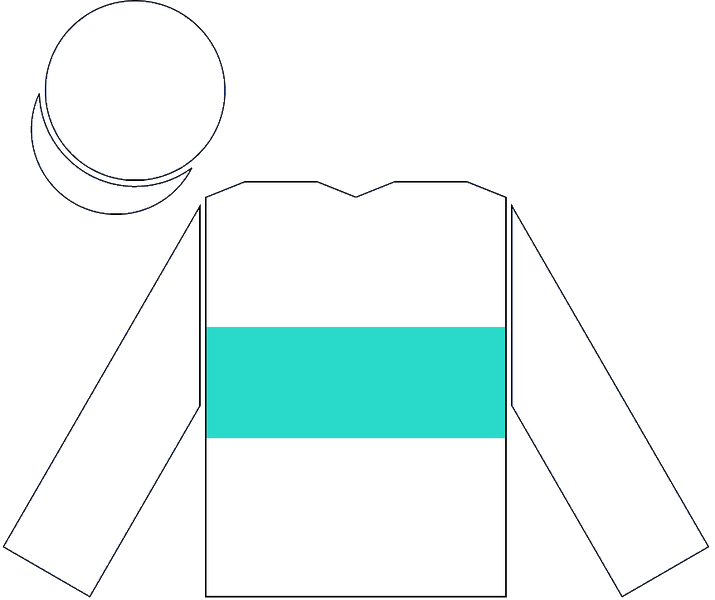
- Racing silks of George Strawbridge
- Sire: Caro
- Grandsire: Fortino
- Dam: Reiko
- Damsire: Targowice
- Sex: Stallion
- Foaled: 1986
- Country: United States
- Colour: Gray
- Breeder: George W. Strawbridge Jr.
- Owner: George W. Strawbridge Jr.
- Trainer: Jonathan Pease
- Record: 27: 6-6-8
- Earnings: £387,750

Major wins
- Prix de l'Esperance (1989); Prix Vicomtesse Vigier (1990, 1991); Prix Kergorlay (1991); Prix Royal-Oak (1991); Irish St. Leger (1991)

Awards
- European Champion Stayer (1991)
- Last updated on November 22, 2007

Turgeon (1986–2019) was an American-bred, French-trained Thoroughbred racehorse and sire. He was best known for his performances over extended distances, winning the Prix Royal-Oak and the Irish St. Leger in 1991, a year in which he was named European Champion Stayer at the Cartier Racing Awards. At stud he was particularly noted as a sire of steeplechase winners and remained active until his death aged 33.

== Background ==
He was owned and bred by American George W. Strawbridge Jr., an avid ice hockey fan and a shareholder and Director of the National Hockey League's Buffalo Sabres. Strawbridge named the foal for the Canadian player Pierre Turgeon who was the team's 1st overall pick in the 1987 NHL entry draft. From a family involved in steeplechase and flat racing, George Strawbridge Jr. maintained racing stables in France and the United States.

Turgeon was prepared for racing by Chantilly-based trainer Jonathan Pease

== Racing career ==
At age three Turgeon's best 1989 performances in conditions races was a win in the Group 2 Prix de l'Esperance and a second in both the Prix Royal-Oak and the Prix Kergorlay. At age four in France he showed endurance with a win in the Group 2 Prix Vicomtesse Vigier over a distance of 3,100 meters (approximately 1.92 miles), and a second in the 3,100 meters Prix de Barbeville, and third in both the 4,000 meter Prix du Cadran and in the 3,100 Prix Royal-Oak. Sent to Weidenpesch Racecourse in Cologne, Germany, he ran second in the Group I Preis von Europa.

Racing as a five-year-old, 1991 would be Turgeon's best year on the racetrack. He repeated as runner-up in the French Prix de Barbeville and in Rome, Italy was third in the then Group 3 Premio Roma Vecchia. Turgeon's wins in France came in the Group 2 Prix Kergorlay and a second consecutive victory in the Group 2 Prix Vicomtesse Vigier. The colt earned his first Group One win in September at the Curragh Racecourse in Ireland, capturing the Irish St. Leger. Back in France he won another Group One race in October, the Prix Royal-Oak.

After his very successful 1991 campaign, Turgeon continued to race for another two years. His best major race results was a third-place finish in the 2½ mile (approximately 4,000 meter) 1992 Ascot Gold Cup in England and a similar effort in that same race in 1993. In France he was third in the 1993 Prix de Barbeville and in Germany, finished second in the 3,200 meter Oleander-Rennen in Baden-Baden.

== Stud record ==
Retired to stud duty in 1994, Turgeon sired a number of European stakes race winners particularly in steeplechase racing and in 2006 was the leading sire in France of jump racing horses. His progeny include Exotic Dancer who won several major steeplechases in England and Ireland and finished second to Kauto Star in the 2007 Cheltenham Gold Cup. At the time of his death in April 2019 he was still standing as a sire at the Haras du Mesnil stud in Savigne-l'Eveque, Sarthe and was the world's oldest active thoroughbred sire, aged 33.
