= Americain (racehorse) =

American-bred Thoroughbred racehorse

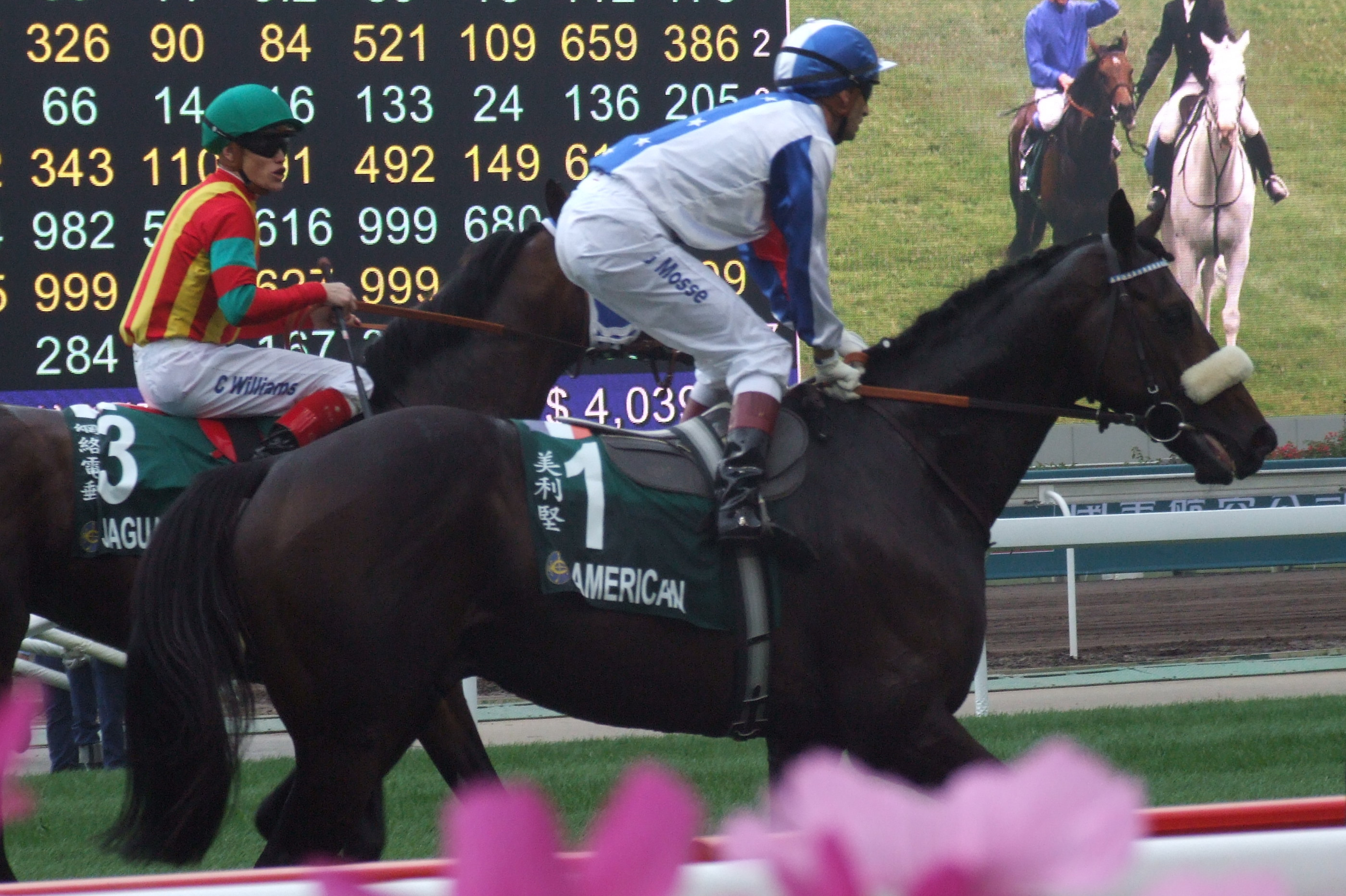
- Sire: Dynaformer
- Grandsire: Roberto
- Dam: America
- Damsire: Arazi
- Sex: Stallion
- Foaled: 2005
- Died: 14 June 2022
- Country: United States of America
- Colour: Bay or Brown
- Breeder: Wertheimer et Frère
- Owner: G T Ryan, K L Bamford, C O Bamford
- Trainer: Alain de Royer-Dupré; David A. Hayes
- Record: 34: 11-4-4
- Earnings: A$5,923,677

Major wins
- Zipping Classic (2011); Moonee Valley Cup (2011); Prix de Reux (2011); Melbourne Cup (2010); Geelong Cup (2010); Prix Kergorlay (2010); Prix Vicomtesse Vigier (2009)

Awards
- Australian Champion Stayer (2011)
- Last updated on 2 November 2010

Americain (2005−2022) was an American-bred French trained thoroughbred racehorse. He won the 150th Melbourne Cup in 2010, ridden by Gérald Mossé, trained by Alain de Royer-Dupré and owned by Melbourne businessmen Gerry Ryan and Kevin & Colleen Bamford.

Americain was purchased in February 2010 by Ryan and Bamford after his 2009 season included a Group 2 win in France and a failed campaign in the United States. He headed into the Melbourne Cup with four consecutive wins, including the Group 2 Prix Kergorlay at his last start in France before heading to Australia, and the Group 3 Geelong Cup at his first Australian start. He won the Melbourne Cup by 2 1/2 lengths, beating Maluckyday into second and champion Australian and short-priced favourite So You Think into third. He was the first French-trained horse to win the Melbourne Cup.

Americain followed up his Melbourne Cup win by running third in the Hong Kong Vase. Returning in 2011, his four runs in France in preparation for his Melbourne Cup defence yielded only one win. However, on return to Australia, he won the Moonee Valley Cup, which made him favorite for the Melbourne Cup despite his 58 kg topweight. He would run fourth in the 2011 Melbourne Cup and subsequently won the Zipping Classic. Americain resided at the well known Victorian breeding stud, Swettenham Stud until June 2022 when he was humanely euthanised following a paddock accident in which he broke his leg.

== Namesake ==
Australian rail operator CFCL Australia named locomotive CF4404 after the horse.
