= Prix Royal-Oak =

Flat horse race in France

Prix Royal-Oak (French St. Leger)
- Class: Group 1
- Location: Saint-Cloud; Saint-Cloud, France
- Inaugurated: 1861
- Race type: Flat / Thoroughbred
- Website: france-galop.com

Race information
- Distance: 3,100 metres (1m 7½f)
- Surface: Turf
- Track: Right-handed
- Qualification: Three-years-old and up
- Weight: 55½ kg (3yo); 59 kg (4yo+); Allowances; 1½ kg for fillies and mares
- Purse: €350,000 (2021); 1st: €199,990

Prix Royal-Oak
2025
Arrow Eagle	Queenstown	Sevenna's Knight

Previous years
2024
Double Major	Sevenna's Knight	Trueshan
2023
Double Major	Skazino	Tashkhan
2022
Iresine	Search For A Song	Sober
2021
Scope	Skazino	Glycon

2020-2011
2020
Subjectivist	Valia	Holdthasigreen
2019
Technician	Call The Wind	Holdthasigreen
2018
Holdthasigreen	Called To The Bar	Morgan Le Faye
2017
Ice Breeze	Vazirabad	Holdthasigreen
2016
Vazirabad	Endless Time	Siljan's Saga
2015
Vazirabad	Siljan's Saga	Mille Et Mille
2014
Tac De Boistron	High Jinx	Narrow Hill
2013
Tac De Boistron	Going Somewhere	Missunited
2012
Les Beaufs	Silver Valny	Rollex Borget
2011
Be Fabulous	Miss Lago	Shankardeh

2010–2001
2010
Gentoo	Celtic Celeb	Opinion Poll
2009
Ask	Schiaparelli	Manighar
2008
Yeats	Allegretto	Veracity
2007
Allegretto	Macleya	Ponte Tresa
2006
Montare	Bellamy Cay	Sergeant Cecil
2005
Alcazar	Reefscape	Shamdala
2004
Westerner	Behkara	Alcazar
2003
Westerner	Alcazar	Behkara
2002
Mr Dinos	Sulk	Clety
2001
Vinnie Roe	Generic	Germinis

2000–1991
2000
Amilynx	San Sebastian	Tajoun
1999
Amilynx	Tajoun	Northerntown
1998
Tiraaz	Erudite	Asolo
1997
Ebadiyla	Snow Princess	Oscar Schindler
1996
Red Roses Story	Moonax	Helen Of Spain
1995
Sunshack	Shrewd Idea	Sunrise Song
1994
Moonax	Always Earnest	Dalara
1993
Raintrap	Mashaallah	Sonus
1992
Assessor	Always Friendly	Sought Out
1991
Turgeon	Shambo	Wajd

1990–1988
1990
Braashee	Indian Queen	Turgeon
1989
Top Sunrise	Turgeon	Robertet
1988
Star Lift	Floripedes	Vaguely Pleasant

The Prix Royal-Oak is a Group 1 flat horse race in France open to thoroughbreds aged three years or older. It is run at Saint-Cloud over a distance of 3,100 metres (about 1 mile and 7½ furlongs), and it is scheduled to take place each year in late October.

It is France's equivalent of the St. Leger Stakes, a famous race in England.

== History ==
The event was established in 1861 at Longchamp, and it was initially called the Grand Prix du Prince Impérial. It was originally restricted to three-year-olds, and was part of a series of races based on the English Classic system. Its original distance was 3,200 metres.

The race was renamed the Prix Royal-Oak and shortened to 3,000 metres in 1869. It was named after Royal Oak (foaled 1823), a key stallion in the establishment of thoroughbred breeding in France. Due to the Franco-Prussian War, the race was not run in 1870 and 1871.

The Prix Royal-Oak was abandoned throughout World War I, with no running from 1914 to 1918. It was cancelled twice during World War II, in 1939 and 1940. It was staged at Le Tremblay in 1943 and 1944.

The event was extended to 3,100 metres in 1964. The present system of race grading was introduced in 1971, and the Prix Royal-Oak was classed at the highest level, Group 1. For a period it was held in mid-September. It was switched to late October in 1977.

Formerly France's equivalent of the St Leger Stakes in England, the Prix Royal-Oak was opened to horses aged four or older in 1979 and to geldings in 1986. Since then the race has dropped significantly in prestige. In 2024 the race was transferred to Saint-Cloud.

== Records ==
Most successful horse (2 wins):

- Amilynx – 1999, 2000
- Westerner – 2003, 2004
- Tac De Boistron – 2013, 2014
- Vazirabad – 2015, 2016
- Double Major - 2023, 2024

Leading jockey (6 wins):

- Freddy Head – Dhaudevi (1968), Bourbon (1971), Busiris (1974), Gold River (1980), Agent Double (1984), Top Sunrise (1989)

Leading trainer (7 wins):

- François Mathet – Vamour (1959), Match (1961), Relko (1963), Reliance (1965), Sassafras (1970), Henri le Balafre (1975), Exceller (1976)
- André Fabre – Star Lift (1988), Top Sunrise (1989), Raintrap (1993), Sunshack (1995), Amilynx (1999, 2000), Be Fabulous (2011)

Leading owner (6 wins):

- Frédéric de Lagrange – Palestro (1861), Fille de l'Air (1864), Gladiateur (1865), Nelusco (1868), Inval (1878), Zut (1879)

== Winners since 1969 ==
Year	Winner	Age	Jockey	Trainer	Owner	Time
1969	Le Chouan	3	André Jézéquel	Freddie Palmer	Geoffroy de Waldner	3:41.30
1970	Sassafras (Note: Hallez finished first in 1970, but he was relegated to second place following a stewards' inquiry)	3	Yves Saint-Martin	François Mathet	Arpad Plesch	3:21.30
1971	Bourbon	3	Freddy Head	Alec Head	Germaine Wertheimer	3:32.50
1972	Pleben	3	Marcel Depalmas	Geoffroy Watson	Baron de Redé	3:30.60
1973	Lady Berry	3	Marcel Depalmas	Geoffroy Watson	Guy de Rothschild	3:26.10
1974	Busiris	3	Freddy Head	Maurice Zilber	Nelson Bunker Hunt	3:25.90
1975	Henri le Balafre	3	Henri Samani	François Mathet	Claude Puerari	3:29.00
1976	Exceller	3	Gérard Dubroeucq	François Mathet	Nelson Bunker Hunt	3:33.80
1977	Rex Magna	3	Philippe Paquet	François Boutin	Elisabeth Couturié	3:28.70
1978	Brave Johnny	3	Henri Samani	Mick Bartholomew	Mireille Darc	3:30.10
1979	Niniski	3	Willie Carson	Dick Hern	Lady Beaverbrook	3:39.90
1980	Gold River	3	Freddy Head	Alec Head	Jacques Wertheimer	3:39.50
1981	Ardross	5	Lester Piggott	Henry Cecil	Charles St George	3:37.70
1982	Denel	3	Yves Saint-Martin	Bernard Sécly	Mrs Salomon Nathan	3:44.20
1983	Old Country	4	Pat Eddery	Luca Cumani	Mrs O. Abegg	3:24.90
1984	Agent Double	3	Freddy Head	Criquette Head	Jacques Wertheimer	3:42.20
1985	Mersey	3	Jean-Luc Kessas	Patrick Biancone	Daniel Wildenstein	3:22.70
1986	El Cuite	3	Steve Cauthen	Henry Cecil	Sheikh Mohammed	3:29.60
1987	Royal Gait	4	Alfred Gibert	John Fellows	Manuel Pereira-Arias	3:34.60
1988	Star Lift	4	Cash Asmussen	André Fabre	Daniel Wildenstein	3:29.80
1989	Top Sunrise	4	Freddy Head	André Fabre	Charles Schmidt	3:22.00
1990 (dh)	Braashee; Indian Queen	4; 5	Michael Roberts; Walter Swinburn	Alec Stewart; Lord Huntingdon	Maktoum Al Maktoum; Sir Gordon Brunton	3:38.40
1991	Turgeon	5	Tony Cruz	Jonathan Pease	George Strawbridge	3:23.40
1992	Assessor	3	Richard Quinn	Richard Hannon Sr.	Bjorn Nielsen	3:35.80
1993	Raintrap	3	Pat Eddery	André Fabre	Khalid Abdullah	3:45.80
1994	Moonax	3	Pat Eddery	Barry Hills	Sheikh Mohammed	3:28.90
1995	Sunshack	4	Thierry Jarnet	André Fabre	Khalid Abdullah	3:16.20
1996	Red Roses Story	4	Vincent Vion	Corine Barande-Barbe	Corine Barande-Barbe	3:38.40
1997	Ebadiyla	3	Gérald Mossé	John Oxx	Aga Khan IV	3:26.50
1998	Tiraaz	4	Gérald Mossé	Alain de Royer-Dupré	Aga Khan IV	3:58.40
1999	Amilynx	3	Olivier Peslier	André Fabre	Jean-Luc Lagardère	3:40.60
2000	Amilynx	4	Olivier Peslier	André Fabre	Jean-Luc Lagardère	3:33.40
2001	Vinnie Roe	3	Pat Smullen	Dermot Weld	Sheridan / Balzarini	3:37.80
2002	Mr Dinos	3	Dominique Boeuf	Paul Cole	Constantine Shiacolas	3:38.50
2003	Westerner	4	Dominique Boeuf	Élie Lellouche	Ecurie Wildenstein	3:31.20
2004	Westerner	5	Stéphane Pasquier	Élie Lellouche	Ecurie Wildenstein	3:28.90
2005	Alcazar	10	Micky Fenton	Hughie Morrison	Repard / Melrose et al.	3:27.30
2006	Montare	4	Olivier Peslier	Jonathan Pease	George Strawbridge	3:20.30
2007	Allegretto	4	Ryan Moore	Sir Michael Stoute	Cheveley Park Stud	3:15.50
2008	Yeats	7	Johnny Murtagh	Aidan O'Brien	Magnier / Nagle	3:19.30
2009	Ask	6	Ryan Moore	Sir Michael Stoute	Patrick Fahey	3:32.17
2010	Gentoo	6	Christophe Lemaire	Alain Lyon	Serge Tripier-Mondancin	3:36.00
2011	Be Fabulous	4	Maxime Guyon	André Fabre	Godolphin	3:21.47
2012	Les Beaufs	3	Julien Guillochon	Valérie Seignoux	Stéphane Seignoux	3:36.22
2013	Tac de Boistron	6	Martin Harley	Marco Botti	Aust Thoroughbred Bldstck	3:38.12
2014	Tac de Boistron	7	Martin Harley	Marco Botti	Aust Thoroughbred Bldstck	3:32.73
2015	Vazirabad (Note: The 2015, 2016 and 2017 runnings took place at Saint-Cloud while Longchamp was closed for redevelopment)	3	Christophe Soumillon	Alain de Royer-Dupré	Aga Khan IV	3:27.61
2016	Vazirabad	4	Christophe Soumillon	Alain de Royer-Dupré	Aga Khan IV	3:29.23
2017	Ice Breeze	3	Vincent Cheminaud	Pascal Bary	Khalid Abdullah	3:25.40
2018	Holdthasigreen (Note: The 2018 running took place at Chantilly to allow track maintenance to take place at Longchamp)	6	Tony Piccone	Bruno Audoin	Jean Gilbert	3:18.17
2019	Technician	3	Pierre-Charles Boudot	Martyn Meade	Team Valor 1	3:40.13
2020	Subjectivist	3	Joe Fanning	Mark Johnston	Dr Jim Walker	3:38.68
2021	Scope	3	Rob Hornby	Ralph Beckett	J H Richmond-Watson	3:27.35
2022	Iresine	5	Marie Velon	Jean-Philippe Gauvin	Bertrand Milliere	3:31.34
2023	Double Major	3	Maxime Guyon	Christophe Ferland	Wertheimer et Frère	3:35.89
2024	Double Major	4	Maxime Guyon	Christophe Ferland	Wertheimer et Frère	3:33.16
2025	Arrow Eagle	4	Cristian Demuro	Jean-Claude Rouget	Mrs Waltraut Spanner	3:23.68
2026	Queenstown	6	Ryan Moore	Aidan O'Brien	Magnier / Tabor / Smith / Westerberg	3:21.58

== Earlier winners ==
- 1861: Palestro
- 1862: Souvenir
- 1863: La Toucques
- 1864: Fille de l'Air
- 1865: Gladiateur
- 1866: Etoile Filante
- 1867: Patricien
- 1868: Nelusco
- 1869: Clotho
- 1870–71: no race
- 1872: Barbillon
- 1873: Boiard
- 1874: Mignonette
- 1875: Perplexe
- 1876: Kilt
- 1877: Jongleur
- 1878: Inval
- 1879: Zut
- 1880: Beauminet
- 1881: Perplexite
- 1882: Clio
- 1883: Stockholm
- 1884: Archiduc
- 1885: Escarboucle
- 1886: Gamin
- 1887: Bavarde
- 1888: Galaor
- 1889: Pourtant
- 1890: Alicante
- 1891: Berenger
- 1892: Chene Royal
- 1893: Ramleh
- 1894: Gouvernail
- 1895: Bombon
- 1896: Champaubert
- 1897: Chambertin
- 1898: Le Roi Soleil
- 1899: Perth
- 1900: Ivoire
- 1901: Jacobite
- 1902: Fer
- 1903: Torquato Tasso
- 1904: Macdonald II
- 1905: Clyde
- 1906: Maintenon
- 1907: Anemone
- 1908: Medeah
- 1909: Aveu
- 1910: Reinhart
- 1911: Combourg
- 1912: Gorgorito
- 1913: Bruleur
- 1914–18: no race
- 1919: Stearine
- 1920: Embry
- 1921: Ksar
- 1922: Keror
- 1923: Filibert de Savoie
- 1924: Uganda
- 1925: Priori
- 1926: Biribi
- 1927: Fiterari
- 1928: Cacao
- 1929: Calandria
- 1930: Taicoun
- 1931: Deiri
- 1932: Laeken
- 1933: Jumbo
- 1934: Brantôme
- 1935: Bokbul
- 1936: Fantastic
- 1937: Victrix
- 1938: Eclair au Chocolat
- 1939–40: no race
- 1941: Le Pacha
- 1942: Tifinar
- 1943: Verso II
- 1944: Samaritain
- 1945: Caracalla
- 1946: Souverain
- 1947: Tourment
- 1948: Spooney
- 1949: Ciel Etoile
- 1950: Pan
- 1951: Stymphale
- 1952: Feu du Diable
- 1953: Buisson d'Or
- 1954: Sica Boy
- 1955: Macip
- 1956: Arabian
- 1957: Scot
- 1958: Wallaby
- 1959: Vamour
- 1960: Puissant Chef
- 1961: Match
- 1962: Sicilian Prince
- 1963: Relko
- 1964: Barbieri
- 1965: Reliance
- 1966: Vasco de Gama
- 1967: Samos
- 1968: Dhaudevi

== See also ==
- List of French flat horse races
- Recurring sporting events established in 1861 – this race is included under its original title, Grand Prix du Prince Impérial.
