= Éric Legrix =

French jockey and horse trainer

Éric Legrix (born 5 September 1965 in France) a French jockey and horse trainer who has won many G1 races, including the Prix Jacques le Marois in 1985 with Vin De France, the Breeders' Cup Turf in 1991 with Miss Alleged, the Hong Kong Derby (twice), the Queen Elizabeth II Cup and the Prix du Cadran (four times). and over 1800 Winners in world.

Legrix retired from riding in December 2009 at the age of 44 and planned a career as a horse trainer, initially as an assistant to Pascal Bary.
