= Tremblay Park =

Park in Paris, France

Coordinates: 48°49′33″N 2°29′17″E

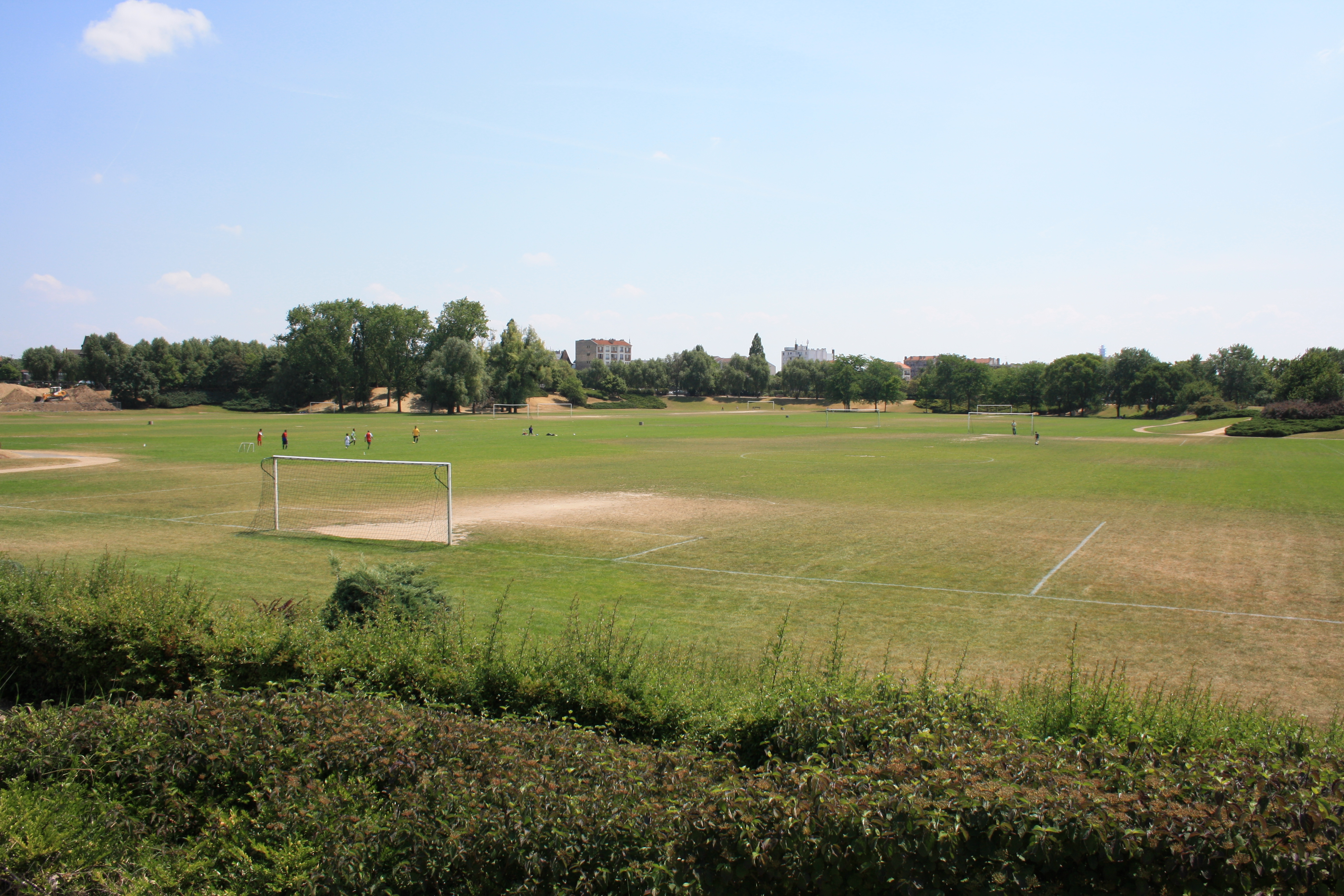

Tremblay Park (French: parc du Tremblay is a park of 73 hectares offering games and sporting activities. It is located in the commune of Champigny-sur-Marne, in the department of Val-de-Marne in Paris urban area. Sporting facilities include a track field, golf, soccer, archery, volleyball and rugby. This park is jointly administered by the general council of Val-de-Marne and the Council of Paris

== History ==
A horse track was inaugurated on the site in 1906. In the 1960s, it was proposed to transform it into an Olympic stadium seating 100,000 people. However, France lost the bid for the Olympics and it was decided to turn the area into a park dedicated to leisure activities. Construction began only in 1975. The park's construction stayed on hold until it was changed to a general sporting facility in 1975, and the park opened the following year.
