= Jonathan Pease =

British racehorse trainer

Personal information
- Born: 8 June 1952 (age 74) Northumberland, England
- Occupation: Trainer

Horse racing career
- Sport: Horse racing
- Career wins: Not found

Major racing wins
- Laurel Futurity Stakes (1987); Yellow Ribbon Stakes (1988); Laurel Dash Stakes (1990); Prix Maurice de Gheest (1991); Prix Royal-Oak (1991, 2006); Irish St. Leger (1991); Turf Classic (1994); Irish 2,000 Guineas (1996); Prix Jacques Le Marois (1996, 1997); Prix du Moulin (1997); Critérium International (2001, 2003); Prix Lupin (2002); Prix Jean Prat (2004); Prix Ganay (2005, 2006) French Classic Race wins: Grand Prix de Paris (1986, 2004); Prix de l'Arc de Triomphe (2004) Breeders' Cup wins: Breeders' Cup Turf (1994); Breeders' Cup Mile (1997, 2014)

Significant horses
- Golden Pheasant, Tikkanen, Spinning World, Turgeon, Act One, Bago

Jonathan Edward Pease (born 8 June 1952 in Northumberland, England) is a member of the prominent Pease family and a Thoroughbred racehorse trainer.

The son of Derrick Allix Pease and the Hon. Rosemary Portman, his grandfather was Sir Richard Arthur Pease, 2nd Baronet of the Pease Baronets, of Hammersknott. After studying at Eton College and Cambridge University, Jonathan Pease began learning the business of conditioning Thoroughbreds for racing in England under the tutelage of Toby Balding and Clive Brittain. He relocated to the United States, where he worked for MacKenzie Miller and in Australia learned under trainer T. J. Smith. In 1976, he went to work for French trainer, François Mathet and in 1979 took up permanent residence in France, where he obtained his trainer's licence and set up a public stable at the Chantilly Racecourse.

Pease raced horses in both European and U.S. events, notably winning two Breeders' Cup races.

Jonathan Pease married Mary Dutton, with whom he has daughters Catherine Annie (b. 1982), Victoria Margaret (b. 1983), and Alice Rosie (b. 1991).
