= Stéphane Pasquier =

French jockey (born 1978)

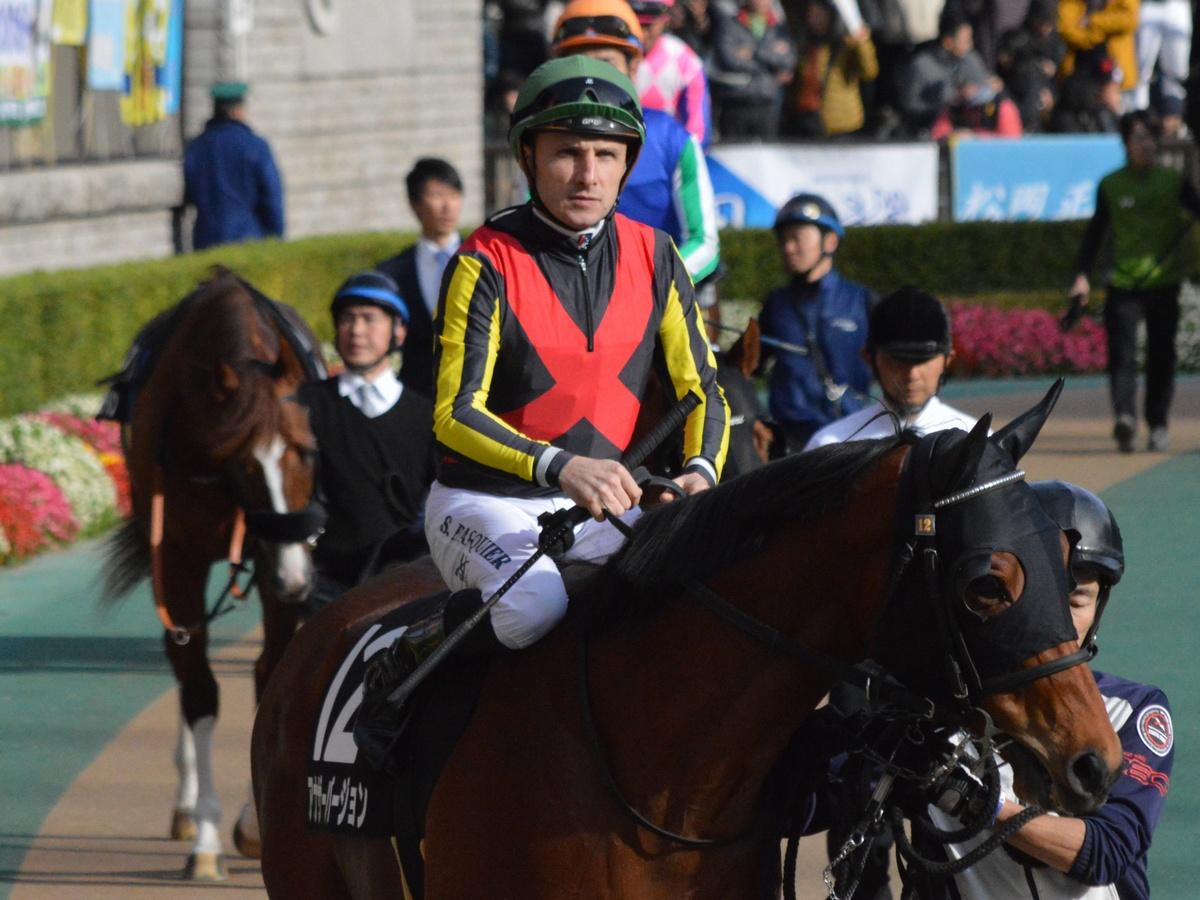
- Pasquier in 2015 (Tokyo Racecourse)

Personal information
- Nationality: French
- Born: 17 January 1978 (age 48)

Horse racing career
- Sport: Horse racing

Stéphane Pasquier (born 17 January 1978 in Paris) is a French flat racing jockey. In October 2006, he won the 85th Prix de l'Arc de Triomphe.

He began as an apprentice for the trainer Robert Collet, and rode in his first race on 6 December 1994, on Raspoutine at Saint-Cloud Racecourse. His first victory was in his second race, riding Floris at Amiens racecourse on 9 September 1995. He is a turbulent and strong character, and confesses to have lost his way in 1997, needing guidance from Robert Collet to help him back. Pasquier won his first Listed Race in 1999, then his first Group 3 race in May 2001, riding Acceleration in the Prix Corrida. During the winter of 2001–2002, he rode in Singapore and on returning to France won his first Group 2 race, the Prix Greffulhe. His first ride in the Prix de l'Arc de Triomphe followed in October 2002, finishing 8th on Fair Mix. After continued successes in Group races throughout 2003, in July 2004, he joined the prestigious Daniel Wildenstein stable as second jockey alongside the number one, Olivier Peslier. On 24 October 2004 he won the Prix Royal-Oak, his first Group 1 race, with Westerner. Several weeks later, he finished 4th in the Japan Cup aboard Policy Maker. In 2005, he won two Group 2 races (the Prix Maurice de Nieuil with Ostankino and the Grand Prix de Deauville with Marend), and finished 3rd in the Grosser Preis von Baden, a Group 1, with Westerner.

In early 2006, Stéphane Pasquier won many races. But in the summer, he had a bizarre accident whilst watching the 2006 FIFA World Cup final on 9 July, breaking a glass in his hands when David Trezeguet's penalty shot hit the crossbar. The injury was expected to keep him out of racing for two months, but he managed to return to racing in late August, and soon started winning again. In October, he rode an outsider Rail Link in the Prix de l'Arc de Triomphe, and was a surprise winner. In 2007, Stéphane Pasquier is awarded his first Cravache d'Or, riding 185 winners in the season. On 2 May 2010 he rode the winner of the English 1000 Guineas when Special Duty trained by Criquette Head-Maarek was awarded the race following a stewards' enquiry. On 1 Nov 2014 he rode Karakontie for Jonathan Pease to win the Breeders Cup Mile (GI) at Santa Anita Park (US).

His nickname is Monsieur Quinté, because he has won more than 200 Quinté+ races (mostly handicaps where punters pick the first five horses in order for a minimum 1 million Euro jackpot), more than any other jockey.

He is a retained jockey for Niarchos family Flaxman Stables in France.

== Major wins ==
France

- Critérium International - (1) - Thewayyouare (2007)
- Critérium de Saint-Cloud - (1) - Wonderment (2018)
- Grand Prix de Paris - (3) - Zambezi Sun (2007), Erupt (2015), Onesto (2022)
- Prix de l'Arc de Triomphe - (1) - Rail Link (2006)
- Prix de la Forêt - (2) - Toylsome (2007), Varenar (2009)
- Prix de Diane - (1) - Senga (2017)
- Poule d'Essai des Poulains - (2) - Lucayan (2012), Karakontie (2014)
- Poule d'Essai des Pouliches - (1) - Special Duty (2010)
- Prix d'Ispahan - (1) - Manduro (2007)
- Prix du Jockey Club - (1) - Study of Man (2018)
- Prix Jacques Le Marois - (1) - Manduro (2007)
- Prix Jean-Luc Lagardère - (1) - Karakontie (2013)
- Prix Marcel Boussac - (1) - Proportional (2008)
- Prix Maurice de Gheest - (2) - Signs of Blessing (2016), King Gold (2023)
- Prix Royal-Oak - (1) - Westerner (2004)

Canada

- Canadian International Stakes - (1) - Erupt (2016)

(United Kingdom) Great Britain

- 1,000 Guineas Stakes - Special Duty (2010)
- Cheveley Park Stakes - (1) - Special Duty (2009)
- Prince of Wales's Stakes - (1) - Manduro (2007)
- Sprint Cup - (1) - African Rose (2008)

Italy

- Gran Criterium - Law Enforcement (2012)

United States

- Breeders' Cup Mile - Karakontie (2014)

== See also ==
- List of jockeys
