= Stradivarius (horse) =

Irish-bred Thoroughbred racehorse

- Racing silks of Bjorn Nielsen
- Sire: Sea the Stars
- Grandsire: Cape Cross
- Dam: Private Life
- Damsire: Bering
- Sex: Stallion
- Foaled: 28 February 2014
- Country: Ireland
- Colour: Chestnut
- Breeder: Bjorn Nielsen
- Owner: Bjorn Nielsen
- Trainer: John Gosden; John & Thady Gosden (from 2021)
- Record: 35: 20-5-5
- Earnings: £3,458,968 + £2,000,000 bonuses

Major wins
- Queen's Vase (2017); Goodwood Cup (2017, 2018, 2019, 2020); Yorkshire Cup (2018, 2019, 2022); Ascot Gold Cup (2018, 2019, 2020); Lonsdale Cup (2018, 2019, 2021); British Champions Long Distance Cup (2018); Doncaster Cup (2019, 2021); Sagaro Stakes (2021)

Awards
- Cartier Champion Stayer (2018, 2019, 2020)

Honours
- Timeform rating: 130; British Champions Series Hall of Fame (2023)
- Last updated on 13 May 2022

Stradivarius (foaled 28 February 2014) is an Irish Thoroughbred racehorse. After winning one minor race as a two-year-old, he emerged as a top-class stayer in the following year, winning the Queen's Vase and Goodwood Cup as well as finishing a close third in the St Leger. As a four-year-old he won the Yorkshire Cup, Ascot Gold Cup, a second Goodwood Cup and the Lonsdale Cup, securing a £1 million bonus for winning all four races, and ended the year by winning the British Champions Long Distance Cup. In 2019 he repeated his victories in the Yorkshire Cup, Ascot Gold Cup and Lonsdale Cup, and won a third Goodwood Cup, giving him a second £1 million bonus. With jockey Frankie Dettori on board, on 18 June 2020, Stradivarius won his third Ascot Gold Cup (by 10 lengths) and on 28 July 2020, he won his record fourth Goodwood Cup. In 2021 he won the Lonsdale Cup for the third time and in 2022 he achieved a third victory in the Yorkshire Cup. He was retired to stud at the end of the 2022 season, having won a record 18 European Group races.

== Background ==
Stradivarius is a chestnut horse with a narrow white blaze and four white socks bred in Ireland by his owner Bjorn Nielsen. He was sent into training with John Gosden at Newmarket, Suffolk.

He is from the fourth crop of foals sired by Sea the Stars who won the 2000 Guineas, Epsom Derby and Prix de l'Arc de Triomphe in 2009. His other major winners have included Harzand, Taghrooda and Sea The Moon. Stradivarius's dam Private Life won two minor races in France and was placed twice Listed races. She was a granddaughter of the outstanding racemare Pawneese.

== Racing career ==
=== 2016: two-year-old season ===
Stradivarius made his racecourse debut in a maiden race over eight and a half furlongs at Nottingham Racecourse on 5 October in which he started at odds of 3/1 and finished fifth of the nine runners behind Contrapposto. Two weeks later, in a similar event over one mile at Newmarket Racecourse he ran fourth behind his stablemate Cracksman. On 7 November the colt stated favourite for a one-mile maiden on the synthetic tapeta track at Newcastle Racecourse. Ridden as on his debut by Robert Havlin he led for most of the way and rallied after being headed in the closing stages to win in a blanket finish from Bowerman, Mutarabby and Lethal Impact.

=== 2017: three-year-old season ===
Stradivarius began his second season in handicap races. Over ten furlongs Beverley Racecourse on 19 April he carried a weight of 131 pounds and won "readily" by six lengths from Election Day. At Chester Racecourse in May he was assigned 133 pounds for a handicap over one and a half miles and was beaten half a length by Here And Now, to whom he was conceding 13 pounds. At Royal Ascot on 23 June, the colt was stepped up in class and distance to contest the Group 2 Queen's Vase over 14 furlongs in which he was partnered by Andrea Atzeni. Starting the 11/2 second choice in the betting he overcame interference in the straight to take the lead inside the final furlong and on by a neck from Count Octave.

On 1 August at Goodwood Racecourse Stradivarius was stepped up to Group 1 class and matched against older stayers in the Goodwood Cup over two miles. Ridden by Atzeni he started the 6/1 second favourite behind Big Orange (winner of the race for the last two years) while the other runners included US Army Ranger, Wicklow Brave (Irish St Leger), Sheikhzayedroad (Northern Dancer Turf Stakes), Pallasator (Doncaster Cup), Qewy (Geelong Cup), Higher Power (Northumberland Plate), High Jinx (Prix du Cadran) and Sweet Selection (Cesarewitch). After racing in mid-division as Big Orange led, Stradivarius began to make progress three furlongs out. He overtook the favourite approaching the final furlong and "stayed on strongly" to win by one and three quarter length with a gap of three and a half lengths back to Desert Skyline in third. John Gosden commented "He's not the biggest of horses and it was a bit rough on the first bend. He didn't panic and it opened up for us. He's a lovely little horse".

At Doncaster Racecourse on 16 September Stradivarius started 9/2 second favourite behind Capri in what appeared to be a strong edition of the St Leger. He made steady progress on the inside in the straight and finished third, beaten half a length and a short head by Capri and Crystal Ocean with Rekindling in fourth. On his final start of the year he took on older horses again the British Champions Long Distance Cup over two miles at Ascot in October in which he finished third behind Order of St George and Torcedor, beaten a length by the winner.

In the 2017 World's Best Racehorse Rankings Stradivarius was given a rating of 118, making him the 90th best racehorse in the world.

=== 2018: four-year-old season ===
On his first appearance as a four-year-old Stradivarius started 4/6 favourite for the Yorkshire Cup over one and three quarter miles at York Racecourse. Ridden by Dettori he took the lead in the last quarter mile and accelerated away from his rivals to win "readily" by three lengths from Desert Skyline. After the race Dettori said "He's a star – it's very rare you get a stayer with a turn of foot, but that is what he has got. It's a deadly combination."

The colt's second appearance at Royal Ascot on 21 June saw him made 7/4 joint favourite with Order of St George for the Gold Cup over two and a half miles, with the third choice in the betting being Vazirabad, a French gelding whose victories included the Prix du Cadran and two editions of the Prix Royal Oak. The other six runners included Desert Skyline, Torcedor, Sheikhzayedroad and Max Dynamite (2nd and 3rd in the last two Melbourne Cups). Dettori settled the colt behind the leaders before moving forward to make his challenge in the straight. Stradivarius took the lead from Torcedor a furlong out and kept on "gamely" to win by three quarters of a length from Vazirabad. Dettori commented "He was a lion, he fought everything off. The crowd lifted him."

On 31 July Stradivarius attempted to repeat his 2017 success in the Goodwood Cup and started 4/5 favourite against six opponents headed by Torcedor, Idaho and Desert Skyline. Atzeni (deputising for the suspended Dettori) tracked the leaders as Torcedor set the pace. He moved into second place in the straight, caught Torcedor inside the final furlong, and won by half a length. His victory meant that a win in the Lonsdale Cup at York in August would earn his owner the WH Stayers’ Million, a £1 million bonus offered for a horse who was able to win the Ascot Gold Cup, Goodwood Cup and Lonsdale Cup in the same season. Commenting on the horse's victory, and his prospects of securing the bonus, Gosden said "He's got a lot of heart, and he was very determined to go and win his race. That [Lonsdale Cup] would be the obvious choice, I’m sure they’ve got it very well insured! He's the most charming horse to be around. He's a lovely ride".

Stradivarius was partnered by Dettori when he started the 4/11 favourite for the Lonsdale Cup on 24 August. His opponents on this occasion included Idaho, Desert Skyline, Max Dynamite, Count Octave and Red Verdon. He won the race and earned the £1 million bonus, beating Count Octave by one and a half lengths after taking the lead a furlong out. Interviewed after the race Gosden commented "he has managed to get over every hurdle and he must feel like he has just gone 12 rounds with Muhammad Ali. He is not a big horse but he is fabulous and he showed a real mentality. Full marks to the owner, he's been trying to breed a Derby winner for years and he ends up with a Cup horse".

Stradivarius ended his season in the Group 2 British Champions Long Distance Cup at Ascot on 20 October although Gosden had considered withdrawing him on account of the soft ground. He started favourite again, with the best-fancied of his five rivals being the Aidan O'Brien-trained three-year-olds Flag of Honour (winner of the Irish St Leger) and Sir Erec. Approaching the final turn he was boxed in on the rail and looked unlikely to get a clear run but Dettori found a gap on the inside and sent him to the front two furlongs out. Stradivarius stayed on well and won by one and a half lengths from the Doncaster Cup winner Thomas Hobson. Dettori said "I had half a chance and took it, but you can only do that when you have plenty of horse. He's been a model of consistency and owns the crown of being champion stayer – you can't take it away from him. He's all heart".

At the 2018 Cartier Awards, Stradivarius was named Cartier Champion Stayer.

In the 2018 World's Best Racehorse Rankings Stradivarius was given a rating of 120, making him the 42nd best racehorse in the world.

=== 2019: five-year-old season ===
Stradivarius began his fourth campaign with an attempt to repeat his 2018 success in the Yorkshire Cup and started at odds of 4/5 against seven opponents including Ispolini (Nad Al Sheba Trophy), Southern France (Yeats Stakes), Mildenberger (Feilden Stakes) Sevenna Star (Sandown Classic Trial) and Desert Skyline. After tracking the leaders he took the lead entering the final furlong and won by three quarters of a length from Southern France. Dettori commented "He was a bit rusty and it was a bit of a sprint... he's a fighter. He's got me out of trouble so many times", while Gosden said "He's a bit of a streetfighter. He was roaring and shouting and slightly misbehaving before the race but then he goes out there and races and gets into a different zone... He's obviously the best stayer I’ve ever trained... It's like all of us, the older we get, the more we need galvanising."

On 20 June Stradivarius ran for the second time in the Ascot Gold Cup and started favourite despite Gosden's concerns that he would be unsuited by the soft ground. The best fancied of his opponents were Dee Ex Bee (runner up in the 2018 Epsom Derby) and Cross Counter while the other eight runners included Capri, Flag of Honour, Thomas Hobson, Called To The Bar (Prix Vicomtesse Vigier) and Magic Circle (Henry II Stakes). After being settled by Dettori just behind the leaders he was boxed in on the inside early in the straight before being switched to the left to obtain a clear run. He took the lead a furlong out and won by a length and a nose from Dee Ex Bee and the 66/1 outsider Master of Reality. After the race Dettori said "What an amazing horse he is. He got me out of trouble. He's a horse for the big occasion".

On 30 July Stradivarius attempted to emulate Double Trigger by becoming the second horse to win a third Goodwood Cup. Dee Ex Bee and Cross Counter renewed their opposition, while the best fancied of the other five runners was the three-year-old Dashing Willoughby (Queen's Vase). After racing in mid division he moved up to take the lead approaching the final furlong and looked likely to win comfortably but as Dettori celebrated by waving to the crowd, Dee Ex Bee rallied strongly and the final winning margin was only a neck. Dettori admitted that he celebrated prematurely before saying "Stradivarius wastes very little energy and he's very tough mentally. He's never going to be flash and win by 10 but he gets the job done. All I have to do is put him in the place to win the race and he does the rest, he's a perfect partner".

It was expected that Stradivarius would go straight to the British Champions Long Distance Cup, but Gosden opted to give him a run in the Doncaster Cup on 13 September. Following the late withdrawal of Dee Ex Bee he went off at odds of 1/9, with the best-fancied of his four opponents being the seven-year-old Barsanti. He recorded his tenth consecutive win as he took the lead a furlong out and won easily by one and three quarter lengths from Cleonte. His success made him the seventh horse after Isonomy, Alycidon, Souepi, Le Moss, Longboat and Double Trigger to win the Stayers' Triple Crown.

On 19 October Stradivarius attempted to win his eleventh consecutive race as he ran for the third time in the British Champions Long Distance Cup and went off the 8/13 favourite. The closing stages saw Stradivarius and the four-year-old Kew Gardens draw away from the field and although the favourite gained a narrow lead a furlong out, his younger rival rallied in the final strides to win by a nose.

On 12 November Stradivarius was named Champion Stayer at the Cartier Awards, taking honour for the second time. In the 2019 World's Best Racehorse Rankings Stradivarius was given a rating of 122, making him the nineteenth best horse in the world, and the best over extended distances.

=== 2020: six-year-old season ===
The 2020 flat racing season in England was disrupted by the COVID-19 pandemic. Stradivarius began his campaign in the Coronation Cup which was run that year at Newmarket on 5 June, and saw him racing over one and a half miles for the first time in three years. He was in contention for most of the way before being outpaced in the last quarter mile and came home third behind Ghaiyyath and Anthony Van Dyck. Gosden commented "That was absolutely perfect and what we expected... he hasn’t run for a very long time. He'll have needed that today as he's a bigger horse again. He's six years old and he's fully developed in every sense. He's bigger and rounder and you could notice that in the paddock".

At Royal Ascot on 18 June Stradivarius attempted to become the third horse after Sagaro and Yeats to win a third consecutive Ascot Gold Cup and was made the 4/5 favourite ahead of seven opponents including Technician, Cross Counter, Moonlight Spirit (Prix de Lutèce), Nayef Road (Sagaro Stakes), Prince of Arran (Geelong Cup) and Withhold (Northumberland Plate). Dettori settled the favourite in mid-division as Nayef Road set the pace and then made steady progress on the outside as the field entered the straight. Stradivarius took the lead approaching the final furlong and drew right away from his opponents in the closing stages to win by ten lengths.

On 28 July, despite giving substantial weight (15 lbs) to the younger horse Santiago and getting boxed in before the final run to victory, Stradivarius won a record fourth Goodwood Cup by one length. His next start was the Prix de l'Arc de Triomphe where he came seventh in the eleven horse field.

On 19 November Stradivarius was named Cartier Champion Stayer for the third time. In the 2020 World's Best Racehorse Rankings, Stradivarius was rated on 125, making him the equal third best racehorse in the world and the best horse over extended distances.

=== 2021: seven-year-old season ===
Stradivarius began his 2021 campaign with a win in the Sagaro Stakes at Ascot on 28 April. In June he made a bid to become the second horse after Yeats to win a fourth Ascot Gold Cup. Starting favourite at odds of 5/6, he was denied a clear run turning into the home straight and finished in fourth position over seven lengths behind the winner Subjectivist. After a two-month break, he returned to the racecourse to win a record third Lonsdale Cup at York. This was followed by his second victory in the Doncaster Cup. He ran twice in October 2021, being placed second to Trueshan in the Prix du Cadran at Longchamp in Paris and then being placed third to Trueshan in the British Champions Long Distance Cup at Ascot. Gosden announced that Stradivarius would stay in training for a final season in 2022, with another attempt at winning a fourth Ascot Gold Cup.

=== 2022: eight-year-old season ===
Stradivarius returned to the racecourse in May 2022 with a third win in the Yorkshire Cup. The victory gave him a record 18th European Group-race victory, one more than the previous record holder Cirrus des Aigles. His bid to win a fourth Ascot Gold Cup failed when he was beaten just over a length into third place by favourite Kyprios. After the race Gosden was critical of Dettori's ride and the pair agreed to "take a sabbatical". In what was to be the final race of his career, Stradivarius was ridden by Atzeni and was beaten a neck by Kyprios in the Goodwood Cup. He missed the Lonsdale Cup on account of a bruised foot and in September 2022 it was announced that he would be retired to stand at the National Stud in Newmarket.

== Career at stud ==
Stradivarius at the National Stud, August 2026

In his first season at the National Stud, Stradivarius covered 120 mares, the majority of which were flat mares. He stood at a modest fee of £10,000, as stamina is not as popular as speed in flat stallions, and breeders were offered bonuses for producing winning progeny. In August 2023 he won the public vote to be inducted into the Qipco British Champions Series Hall of Fame.

Pedigree of Stradivarius (IRE), chestnut horse, 2014
Sire Sea the Stars (IRE) 2006	Cape Cross (IRE); 1994	Green Desert	Danzig
Sire Sea the Stars (IRE) 2006	Cape Cross (IRE); 1994	Green Desert	Foreign Courier
Sire Sea the Stars (IRE) 2006	Cape Cross (IRE); 1994	Park Appeal	Ahonoora
Sire Sea the Stars (IRE) 2006	Cape Cross (IRE); 1994	Park Appeal	Balidaress
Sire Sea the Stars (IRE) 2006	Urban Sea (USA); 1989	Miswaki	Mr. Prospector
Sire Sea the Stars (IRE) 2006	Urban Sea (USA); 1989	Miswaki	Hopespringseternal
Sire Sea the Stars (IRE) 2006	Urban Sea (USA); 1989	Allegretta	Lombard
Sire Sea the Stars (IRE) 2006	Urban Sea (USA); 1989	Allegretta	Anatevka
Dam Private Life (FR) 1997	Bering (GB); 1983	Arctic Tern	Sea-Bird
Dam Private Life (FR) 1997	Bering (GB); 1983	Arctic Tern	Bubbling Beauty
Dam Private Life (FR) 1997	Bering (GB); 1983	Beaune	Lyphard
Dam Private Life (FR) 1997	Bering (GB); 1983	Beaune	Barbra
Dam Private Life (FR) 1997	Poughkeepsie (IRE); 1992	Sadler's Wells	Northern Dancer
Dam Private Life (FR) 1997	Poughkeepsie (IRE); 1992	Sadler's Wells	Fairy Bridge
Dam Private Life (FR) 1997	Poughkeepsie (IRE); 1992	Pawneese	Carvin
Dam Private Life (FR) 1997	Poughkeepsie (IRE); 1992	Pawneese	Plencia (Family 9)
