= Shangamuzo =

British-bred Thoroughbred racehorse

- Sire: Klairon
- Grandsire: Clarion
- Dam: French Fern
- Damsire: Mossborough
- Sex: Stallion
- Foaled: 13 March 1973
- Country: United Kingdom
- Colour: Chestnut
- Breeder: Henry Rogers Broughton, 2nd Baron Fairhaven
- Owner: E Charles
- Trainer: John Sutcliffe; Gavin Hunter; Michael Stoute
- Record: 34:8-9-5

Major wins
- King George V Stakes (1976); Top Rank Club Handicap (1976); Doncaster Cup (1977); Sagaro Stakes (1978); Ascot Gold Cup (1978)

Awards
- Timeform rating -p (1975), 108 (1976), 121 (1977), 125 (1978), 113 (1979)

Shangamuzo (13 March 1973 – after 1989) was a British Thoroughbred racehorse and sire best known for winning the Ascot Gold Cup in 1978. A specialist stayer, he won eight of his thirty-four races, finished second nine times and third on five occasions.

He showed promise as a two-year-old in 1975, despite being beaten in all three of his races. In the following season he established himself as a good performer in handicaps, winning five races including the King George V Stakes at Royal Ascot and finishing second in the Jockey Club Cup. In 1977 he emerged as a top-class stayer despite winning only once from eleven starts: he won the Doncaster Cup and was placed in the Paradise Stakes, Yorkshire Cup, Queen Alexandra Stakes and Jockey Club Stakes. Shangamuzo reached his peak as a five-year-old in 1978 when he engaged in a series of races against the outstanding French-bred stayer Buckskin. Shangamuzo decisively defeated Buckskin in both the Sagaro Stakes and the Ascot Gold Cup but after sustaining an injury in the Goodwood Cup he was beaten by his rival in the Doncaster Cup and the Jockey Club Cup.

After an unsuccessful campaign in 1979 he was retired to stud in Brazil, where he had some success as a sire of winners.

== Background ==
Shangamuzo, was a big, powerful, dark chestnut horse with a small white star and a white sock on his right hind leg bred in England by Henry Rogers Broughton, 2nd Baron Fairhaven. His sire Klairon was a top-class racehorse whose wins included the Poule d'Essai des Poulains in 1955. Apart from Shangamuzo, he sired the Champion Stakes winner Lorenzaccio and Prix Jacques Le Marois winner Luthier. Klairon was a representative of the Byerley Turk sire line, unlike more than 95% of modern thoroughbreds, who descend directly from the Darley Arabian. Shangamuzo was one of several winners produced by his dam French Fern, a high-class racemare who won the Ribblesdale Stakes in 1960 and was rated 118 by Timeform. As a descendant of the broodmare French Kiss, she was a distant relative of the Breeders' Cup Mile winner Barathea.

In 1974, as a yearling, Shangamuzo was offered for sale and bought for 3000 guineas by representatives of Mrs E. White. He was first sent into training with John Sutcliffe at Epsom.

== Racing career ==
=== 1975: two-year-old season ===
After finishing unplaced in his first two starts over seven furlongs, Shangamuzo ran in a twenty-two runner maiden race over a mile at Sandown Park Racecourse in October. He showed some promise in finishing fifth, without being given a hard race.

=== 1976: three-year-old season ===
Shangamuzo emerged as a successful handicapper in the first half of his three-year-old season, in which he was trained by Gavin Hunter. On his first appearance of the season he won a maiden race over eleven furlongs at Kempton and then finished second to Lighter in a handicap over on and a half miles at Haydock in June, but was awarded the race after the "winner" was disqualified for causing interference. Later that month he was sent to Royal Ascot and recorded his first major success in the King George V Stakes and was then stepped up in distance to win a minor event over two miles at Newcastle Racecourse. Shangamuzo's winning run came to an end when he finished fifth in a race at Newbury and he then finished third to Sir Montagu and the future Cheltenham Gold Cup winner Alverton in the Ebor Handicap at York in August. On his next appearance, Shangamuzo defeated Alverton by one and a half lengths in the Top Rank Club Handicap at Newcastle to win his fifth race of the season. In October, the colt was moved up in class and finished second to Bright Finish in the Group Three Jockey Club Cup over two miles at Newmarket.

=== 1977: four-year-old season ===
After finishing unplaced on his debut at a four-year-old, Shangamuzo finished second by a neck to the filly Centrocon in the Paradise Stakes at Newbury. In May he ran third to Bright Finish and Grey Baron in the Yorkshire Cup and was then sent to France and finished fourth behind Buckskin, Sagaro and Citoyen in the Prix du Cadran at Longchamp Racecourse. At Royal Ascot, he ran in the two and three quarter mile Queen Alexandra Stakes and finished second behind the six-year-old John Cherry, who, as a gelding, was not allowed to compete in many of the major staying races. Later in June, Shangamuzo reverted to handicaps and ran one of his few poor races when unplaced behind Tug of War in the Northumberland Plate.

After a break of two and a half months, Shangamuzo returned in the Doncaster Cup in which he was ridden by Pat Eddery and started a 33/1 outsider. His opponents were Tug of War, Grey Baron, Bruni and the Dick Hern-trained four-year-old Belfalas. Shangamuzo took the lead half a mile from the finish and was never in any danger of defeat, recording his first Group race win by four lengths from Belfalas, with Grey Baron a further four lengths back in third. He then finished second to Nearly A Hand when carrying top weight of 141 pounds in the Newbury Autumn Cup. In his second attempt to win the Jockey Club Cup, Shangamuzo led from the start but was caught inside the final furlong and was beaten three quarters of a length by Grey Baron. On his final appearance of the season, he finished sixth behind John Cherry in the Prix Gladiateur over 4000 metres at Longchamp on 30 October.

=== 1978: five-year-old season ===
In 1978, Shangamuzo moved to the Newmarket stable of Michael Stoute. On his first appearance for his new trainer, Shangamuzo started at odds of 12/1 for the Sagaro Stakes (formerly the Paradise Stakes) on very soft ground at Ascot in April. Ridden by Greville Starkey, he took the lead in the straight and drew away from his rivals to win by twelve lengths from the favourite Buckskin. In his next two races, Shangamuzo finished second to the Dick Hern-trained five-year-old Smuggler in the Yorkshire Cup and the Henry II Stakes. At York, Shangamuzo was beaten two lengths by Smuggler when attempting to concede three pounds to his rival, but was widely expected to reverse the form at level weights over a longer distance at Sandown. In the Henry II Stakes, however, Shangamuzo appeared to be unsuited by the firm ground, and was beaten two and a half lengths.

Shangamuzo, ridden by Starkey, started at odds of 13/2 for the Ascot Gold Cup over two and a half miles at Royal Ascot, with Buckskin starting favourite ahead of the filly Royal Hive (winner of the Park Hill Stakes). The other runners included Duky and Hawkberry who had finished second and third to Buckskin in the Prix du Cadran. Smuggler did not contest the Gold Cup, his owner, Lord Porchester stating that the unfashionable status of stayers as breeding stallions meant that it would devalue the horse to even enter him in the race. Buckskin's pacemaker Palei set a strong pace until six furlongs from the finish when Shangamuzo moved into the lead with Buckskin close behind. The two engaged in a brief struggle before Shangamuzo established a decisive advantage on the turn into the straight. He was never seriously challenged in the closing stages and won by two lengths from Royal Hive, with Hawkberry a length and a half away in third. Timeform described Shangamuzo's performance as "a magnificent display of courage and endurance". In the Goodwood Cup, Shangamuzo conceded weight to his rivals and led for most of the way but was caught in the closing stages and finished third behind Tug of War and the three-year-old Arapahos. It was subsequently discovered that the horse had sustained a leg injury in the race which kept him off the racecourse until the autumn.

On his return to racing, Shangamuzo was matched against Buckskin in two races which were expected to decide the identity of the best staying horse in Europe. In the Doncaster Cup, Shangamuzo appeared less than fully fit and finished third behind Buckskin and Billion. In October, Shangamuzo and Buckskin met for the final time in the Jockey Club Cup at Newmmarket. There appeared to be no excuses for Shangamuzo on this occasion as he proved no match for his rival and was beaten eight lengths into second place.

=== 1979: six-year-old season ===
Shangamuzo remained in training as a six-year-old but failed to recover his best form in four races. His best effort came when he finished fourth of five, beaten four lengths by El Badr in the Prix du Cadran. On his final appearance he finished a distant fourth behind Le Moss, Buckskin and Arapahos in the Ascot Gold Cup.

== Assessment ==
In 1975, the independent Timeform organisation did not give a rating to Shangamuzo but awarded him a "p", indicating that the colt was likely to make more than normal progress, and commented that he was certain to stay one and a half miles. In the following year, Shangamuzo was given a weight of 117 pounds in the official British Free Handicap, twenty-three pounds below the top-rated Vitiges. He was given a rating of 108 by Timeform, twenty-one pounds behind their best stayer Sagaro, and was described in their annual Racehorses of 1976 as "very genuine and consistent". In 1977, Shangamuzo's Timeform rating improved to 121, twelve pounds behind the best stayers Sagaro and Dunfermline. In the inaugural International Classification, he was given a rating of 84, ten pounds below the top-rated older horses Balmerino and Orange Bay. In 1978, Shangamuzo achieved his peak Timeform rating of 125, eight pounds below the best stayer Buckskin. In the International Classification he was rated seven pounds below Buckskin and sixteen pounds behind the top-rated Alleged. His abbreviated 1979 season saw him awarded a 113 rating by Timeform.

In their book A Century of Champions, based on a modified version of the Timeform system, John Randall and Tony Morris rated Shangamuzo as an "inferior" winner of the Gold Cup.

== Stud career ==
At the end of his racing career, Shangamuzo was exported to become a breeding stallion in Brazil. He had some success as a sire of winners. His last reported offspring were foaled in 1990.

== Pedigree ==
Pedigree of Shangamuzo (GB), chestnut stallion, 1973
Sire Klairon (FR) 1952	Clarion (FR); 1944	Djebel	Tourbillon
Sire Klairon (FR) 1952	Clarion (FR); 1944	Djebel	Loika
Sire Klairon (FR) 1952	Clarion (FR); 1944	Columba	Colorado
Sire Klairon (FR) 1952	Clarion (FR); 1944	Columba	Gay Bird
Sire Klairon (FR) 1952	Kalmia (FR); 1931	Kantar	Alcantara
Sire Klairon (FR) 1952	Kalmia (FR); 1931	Kantar	Karabe
Sire Klairon (FR) 1952	Kalmia (FR); 1931	Sweet Lavender	Swynford
Sire Klairon (FR) 1952	Kalmia (FR); 1931	Sweet Lavender	Marchetta
Dam French Fern (GB) 1957	Mossborough (GB); 1947	Nearco	Pharos
Dam French Fern (GB) 1957	Mossborough (GB); 1947	Nearco	Nogara
Dam French Fern (GB) 1957	Mossborough (GB); 1947	All Moonshine	Bobsleigh
Dam French Fern (GB) 1957	Mossborough (GB); 1947	All Moonshine	Selene
Dam French Fern (GB) 1957	Star Of France (GB); 1947	William of Valence	Vatout
Dam French Fern (GB) 1957	Star Of France (GB); 1947	William of Valence	Queen Iseult
Dam French Fern (GB) 1957	Star Of France (GB); 1947	Allied Girl	Bold Archer
Dam French Fern (GB) 1957	Star Of France (GB); 1947	Allied Girl	French Kiss (Family 14-a)
