= Sadeem =

American-bred Thoroughbred racehorse

- Sire: Forli
- Grandsire: Aristophanes
- Dam: Miss Mazepah
- Damsire: Nijinsky
- Sex: Stallion
- Foaled: 25 March 1983
- Country: United States
- Colour: Chestnut
- Breeder: King Ranch
- Owner: Sheikh Mohammed
- Trainer: Guy Harwood
- Record: 23: 9-6-2

Major wins
- Churchill Stakes (1986); Sagaro Stakes (1987); Ascot Gold Cup (1988, 1999); Goodwood Cup (1988); Prix Gladiateur (1988); Henry II Stakes (1989)

Honours
- Timeform rating: 106 (1986), 111 (1987)

Sadeem (foaled 1983) was an American-bred, British-trained Thoroughbred racehorse and sire. A specialist stayer, he won consecutive runnings of the Ascot Gold Cup in 1988 and 1989. His other victories included the Sagaro Stakes, Goodwood Cup, Prix Gladiateur and Henry II Stakes.

== Background ==
Sadeem was a big, strong, "workmanlike" chestnut horse with a white blaze and two white socks bred in Kentucky by King Ranch. His sire Forli was a champion in his native Argentina before becoming a successful breeding stallion in the United States. His best-known offspring was Forego, the three-time American Horse of the Year, whilst his European runners included Thatch. Sadeem's dam, Miss Mazepah, was a daughter of The Oaks winner Monade.

As a yearling, Sadeem was sent to the sales and was bought for $155,000 by representatives of Sheikh Mohammed. The colt was sent to England where he was trained by Guy Harwood at Pulborough in West Sussex. He was ridden in all of his major races by the English jockey Greville Starkey.

== Racing career ==
=== 1986: three-year-old season ===
After finishing third on his racecourse debut, Sadeem recorded his first victory when beating Danishgar by half a length in the Churchill Stakes over one and a half miles at Ascot Racecourse in June 1986. In July he was a very easy winner of a race for amateur riders at Newmarket Racecourse and was then moved up in class for the March Stakes over fourteen furlongs at Goodwood in August when he finished second to Celestial Storm.

=== 1987: four-year-old season ===
On his first appearance as a four-year-old, Sadeem started second favourite, at odds of 100/30 for the Group Three Sagaro Stakes over two miles at Ascot. Ridden by Greville Starkey he appeared to be struggling in the early stages and turned into the straight in sixth place. He made steady progress in the closing stages to take the lead inside the final furlong and won by three quarters of a length from Paean. He went on to contest most of the seasons major staying races, running well without winning. He finished second to Saronicos in the Henry II Stakes at Sandown Park Racecourse, second to Paean on very soft ground in the Ascot Gold Cup and fifth in the Prix Kergorlay. In Autumn he finished second to Buckley in the Doncaster Cup when conceding three pounds to the winner but ended the season disappointingly by finishing unplaced in the Jockey Club Cup.

=== 1988: five-year-old season ===
Sadeem began his third season by finishing third to the Henry Cecil-trained Primitive Rising in the Henry II Stakes on 30 May. On 16 June Sadeem contested his second Ascot Gold Cup and was made the 7/2 favourite against twelve opponents. He turned into the straight in third place and stayed on in the closing stages to finish second, five lengths behind the five-year-old gelding Royal Gait. After a stewards' enquiry Royal Gait was disqualified and placed last for causing interference early in the straight and the Group One prize was awarded to Sadeem. In July, Sadeem started the 4/6 favourite for the Goodwood Cup and won by a length from the 20/1 outsider Spruce Baby, to whom he was conceding seven pounds.

After again finishing fifth in the Prix Kergorlay, Sadeem attempted to complete the Stayers' Triple Crown in the Doncaster Cup on 8 September. He was matched against Kneller an undefeated three-year-old who had won the Ebor Handicap on his previous appearance. After a prolonged struggle over the last three furlongs, Sadeem was beaten three-quarters of a length by Kneller, to whom he was conceding sixteen pounds. Seventeen days later, Sadeem was sent to France to contest the Prix Gladiateur over 4000 metres at Longchamp Racecourse. He took the lead 400 metres from the finish and won comfortably by four lengths from Trebrook. Sadeem returned to Longchamp in October for the Prix Royal Oak over 3200 metres in which he finished unplaced behind Star Lift.

=== 1989: six-year-old season ===
As in the previous year, Sadeem began his campaign in the Henry II Stakes at Sandown. Starting at odds of 9/1 he caught up with his stable companion Zero Watt inside the final furlong and won by a neck. On 22 June Sadeem ran in the Ascot Gold Cup for the third time and was made the 8/11 favourite in a field of eight runners. He took the lead three furlongs from the finish and was never in any danger of defeat, accelerating clear of the field to win by eight lengths from Mazzacano. Sadeem met Mazzacano again in the Goodwood Cup a month later. Carrying seven pound more than his rival, Sadeem took the lead three furlongs from the finish but was overtaken by Mazzacano inside the final furlong and was beaten into second place by a neck.

=== 1990: seven-year-old season ===
Sadeem began his seven-year-old season in the Douglas Stakes over fourteen furlongs at Salisbury Racecourse on 3 May. He successfully conceded ten pounds to the four-year-old colt Ashal, winning by a neck after taking the lead half a mile from the finish. On 21 June, Sadeem attempted to become the second horse, after Sagaro to win three consecutive runnings of the Ascot Gold Cup. Starting at odds of 5/1 he was among the leaders until six furlongs from the finish, when he dropped back and finished eighth of the eleven runner, more than forty lengths behind the winner Ashal. Sadeem' last race was the Goodwood Cup on 2 August, in which he finished fourth behind the lightly weighted three-year-old Lucky Moon.

== Assessment ==
In their book A Century of Champions, based on a modified version of the Timeform system, John Randall and Tony Morris rated Sadeem as a "poor" winner of the Gold Cup.

== Retirement ==
Sadeem was retired to stud but had fertility problems and sired very few foals. He was sent back into training with the National Hunt trainer Martin Pipe but never ran again.

== Pedigree ==
Pedigree of Sadeem (USA), chestnut stallion, 1983
Sire Forli (ARG) 1963	Aristophanes (GB); 1948	Hyperion	Gainsborough
Sire Forli (ARG) 1963	Aristophanes (GB); 1948	Hyperion	Selene
Sire Forli (ARG) 1963	Aristophanes (GB); 1948	Commotion	Mieuxce
Sire Forli (ARG) 1963	Aristophanes (GB); 1948	Commotion	Riot
Sire Forli (ARG) 1963	Trevisa (ARG); 1951	Advocate	Fair Trial
Sire Forli (ARG) 1963	Trevisa (ARG); 1951	Advocate	Guiding Star
Sire Forli (ARG) 1963	Trevisa (ARG); 1951	Veneta	Foxglove
Sire Forli (ARG) 1963	Trevisa (ARG); 1951	Veneta	Dogaresa
Dam Miss Mazepah (USA) 1972	Nijinsky (CAN); 1967	Northern Dancer	Nearctc
Dam Miss Mazepah (USA) 1972	Nijinsky (CAN); 1967	Northern Dancer	Natalma
Dam Miss Mazepah (USA) 1972	Nijinsky (CAN); 1967	Flaming Page	Bull Page
Dam Miss Mazepah (USA) 1972	Nijinsky (CAN); 1967	Flaming Page	Flaring Top
Dam Miss Mazepah (USA) 1972	Monade (FR); 1959	Klairon	Clarion
Dam Miss Mazepah (USA) 1972	Monade (FR); 1959	Klairon	Kalmia
Dam Miss Mazepah (USA) 1972	Monade (FR); 1959	Mormyre	Atys
Dam Miss Mazepah (USA) 1972	Monade (FR); 1959	Mormyre	Morkande (Family:13-d)
