= St. Leger Italiano =

- Class: Group 3
- Location: San Siro Racecourse; Milan, Italy
- Race type: Flat / Thoroughbred
- Website: San Siro

Race information
- Distance: 2,800 metres (1¾ miles)
- Surface: Turf
- Track: Right-handed
- Qualification: Three-years-old and up
- Weight: 54 kg (3yo); 57 kg (4yo+); Allowances; 1½ kg for fillies and mares Penalties; 3 kg for Group 1 winners * 2 kg for Group 2 winners * 1 kg for Group 3 winners * * since January 1, 2016
- Purse: €64,900 (2016); 1st: €23,800

The St. Leger Italiano is a Group 3 flat horse race in Italy open to thoroughbreds aged three years or older. It is run at Milan over a distance of 2,800 metres (about 1¾ miles), and it is scheduled to take place each year in October.

It is Italy's equivalent of the St. Leger Stakes, a famous race in England.

== History ==
St. Leger Italiano was established in the late 19th century, and it was originally restricted to three-year-olds.

The first winner to complete a Triple Crown (having previously won the Premio Parioli and the Derby Italiano) was Niccolo dell'Arca in 1941. The feat was subsequently achieved by Gladiolo in 1946 and Botticelli in 1954.

The present system of race grading was introduced in the early 1970s, and for a period St. Leger Italiano held Group 2 status. It was relegated to Group 3 level in 1988, and from this point, it was contested over 2,900 metres at Turin. For several years it was held in July.

The race was opened to older horses and rescheduled for the autumn in 1994. It was later downgraded to Listed level, and it began its current spell in Milan in 2002. It regained Group 3 status in 2010.

== Records ==
Most successful horse (3 wins):

- Noel – 1999, 2000, 2001

Leading jockey since 1988 (3 wins):

- Mirco Demuro – Maktub (2002), N'Oubliez Jamais (2006), Spanish Hidalgo (2007)
- Dario Vargiu - Parivash (2013), Atzeco (2021), Taany (2024)

Leading trainer since 1988 (4 wins):

- Hans Blume – Noel (1999, 2000, 2001), N'Oubliez Jamais (2006)

== Winners since 1988 ==
Year	Winner	Age	Jockey	Trainer	Time
1988	Welsh Guide	3	Vittorio Panici	Michael Jarvis	3:09.25
1989	Sierra Star	3	Vittorio Panici	Michael Jarvis	3:06.60
1990	Parting Moment	3	Bruce Raymond	Ian Balding	3:04.20
1991	Green Senor	3	Michel Planard	Emilio Borromeo	3:10.00
1992	Jape	3	Alan Munro	Paul Cole	3:11.00
1993	Pay Me Back	3	Sergio Dettori	Gianfranco Verricelli	3:15.40
1994	Double Trigger	3	Jason Weaver	Mark Johnston	3:20.80
1995	Assessor	6	Richard Hughes	Richard Hannon Sr.	3:21.00
1996	Duke of Flite	3	Giovanni Forte	R. Rossini	3:10.60
1997	Belsalazie	4	Frédéric Spanu	Jacques Heloury	3:11.60
1998	Rondan	3	Mario Esposito	Vittorio Caruso	3:06.00
1999	Noel	4	Massimiliano Tellini	Hans Blume	3:14.60
2000	Noel	5	Jorge Horcajada	Hans Blume	3:07.60
2001	Noel	6	Massimiliano Tellini	Hans Blume	3:11.60
2002	Maktub	3	Mirco Demuro	Bruno Grizzetti	3:39.20
2003	Liquido	4	L. Hammer-Hansen	Horst Steinmetz	3:16.40
2004	Liquido	5	Edmondo Botti	Horst Steinmetz	3:13.00
2005	Backbord	3	Andrasch Starke	Andreas Schütz	3:06.70
2006	N'Oubliez Jamais	3	Mirco Demuro	Hans Blume	3:10.40
2007	Spanish Hidalgo	3	Mirco Demuro	John Dunlop	3:15.60
2008	no race ^{[a]}
2009	Caudillo	6	Henk Grewe	Dr Andreas Bolte	3:01.80
2010	Burma Gold	3	Jiri Palik	Peter Schiergen	3:04.20
2011	Altano	5	Jozef Bojko	Andreas Wöhler	2:53.60
2012	Donn Halling	4	Vaclav Janacek	Vaclav Luka Jr.	3:07.00
2013	Parivash	4	Dario Vargiu	Waldemar Hickst	3:07.70
2014	Rock Of Romance	4	Eduardo Pedroza	Andreas Wohler	3:06.90
2015	Autor	5	Carlo Fiocchi	Frantisek Holcak	3:08.70
2016	Dschingis Secret	3	Martin Seidl	Markus Klug	3:01.20
2017	Trip To Rhodos	8	Vaclav Janacek	Pavel Tuma	3:02.80
2018	O'Juke	3	Sergio Urru	Lucia Lupinacci	3:01.10
2019	Pretending	6	Fabio Branca	Alessandro Botti	3:19.90
2020	Sir Polski	3	Michael Cadeddu	Henk Grewe	3:18.70
2021	Atzeco^{[b]}	3	Dario Vargiu	Alduino Botti	3:16.10
2022	Sir Polski	5	Silvano Mulas	Henk Grewe	3:24.60
2023	Roberto Escobarr	6	Marco Ghiani	Michael Appleby	3:25.9
2024	Taany	4	Dario Vargiu	Luciano Vitabile	3:27.10
2025	Orion Queen	4	Antonio Orani	Mme Manon Scandella-Lacaille	3:35.70
2026	Amico	4	Dario Di Tocco	Henke Grewe	3:23.7

^{a} The 2008 running was cancelled because of a strike.
^{b} The 2021 races took place at Capannelle.

== Earlier winners ==
- 1892: Dardinello
- 1893: Festuca
- 1894: Sansonetto
- 1895: Oranzeb
- 1896: Goldoni
- 1897: Hira
- 1898: Brunello
- 1899: Elena
- 1900: Kikamba
- 1901: Silvana
- 1902: Euro
- 1903: Esquilino
- 1904: Eureka
- 1905: Onorio
- 1906: Plinio
- 1907: San Gallo
- 1908: Qui Vive
- 1909: Dedalo
- 1910: Wistaria
- 1911: Alcimedonte
- 1912: Valmy
- 1913: Arianna
- 1914: Prometeo
- 1915: Aristippo
- 1916: Kibwesi
- 1917: Alcione
- 1918: Burne Jones
- 1919: Delft
- 1920: Vodice
- 1921: Michelangelo
- 1922: Fiorello
- 1923: Giovanna Dupre
- 1924: Manistee
- 1925: Major
- 1926: Cranach
- 1927: Delfino
- 1928: Akenaton
- 1929: Ortello
- 1930: Ostiglia
- 1931: Ageratum
- 1932: Fenolo
- 1933: Crapom
- 1934: Grand Marnier
- 1935: Lub
- 1936: Tellurio
- 1937: El Greco
- 1938: Ursone
- 1939: Lafcadio
- 1940: Bellini
- 1941: Niccolo dell'Arca
- 1942: Scire
- 1943: Tokamura
- 1944: Macherio
- 1945: Peana
- 1946: Gladiolo
- 1947: Tenerani
- 1948: Trevisana
- 1949: Antonio Canale
- 1950: Tommaso Guidi
- 1951: Daumier
- 1952: Belfagor
- 1953: De Dreux
- 1954: Botticelli
- 1955: Derain
- 1956: Barbara Sirani
- 1957: Braque
- 1958: Tiepolo
- 1959: Feria
- 1960: Tiziano
- 1961: Proteo
- 1962: Bragozzo
- 1963: Tavernier
- 1964: Crivelli
- 1965: Ben Marshall
- 1966: Chio
- 1967: Carlos Primero
- 1968: Baccio Bandinelli
- 1969: Bacuco
- 1970: Alcamo
- 1971: Weimar
- 1972: Tierceron
- 1973: Veio
- 1974: Mister Henry
- 1975: Laomedonte
- 1976: Gallio
- 1977: Novigrad
- 1978: Xibury
- 1979: Quadrupler
- 1980: Lotar
- 1981: Solero
- 1982: Crusader Castle
- 1983: Celio Rufo
- 1984: Rough Pearl
- 1985: Fire of Life
- 1986: Comme l'Etoile
- 1987: Sergeyevich

== See also ==
- List of Italian flat horse races
