= Sagaro Stakes =

Flat horse race in Britain

- Class: Group 3
- Location: Ascot Racecourse; Ascot, England
- Race type: Flat / Thoroughbred
- Sponsor: Longines
- Website: Ascot

Race information
- Distance: 1m 7f 209y (3,209 metres)
- Surface: Turf
- Track: Right-handed
- Qualification: Four-years-old and up
- Weight: 9 st 2 lb (4yo); 9 st 4 lb (5yo+); Allowances; 3 lb for fillies and mares Penalties; 7 lb for Group 1 winners * 5 lb for Group 2 winners * 3 lb for Group 3 winners * * since 31 August 2024
- Purse: £80,000 (2025); 1st: £45,368

Sagaro Stakes
2026
Sweet William	Caballo De Mar	Miss Alpilles

Previous years
2025
Yashin	Coltrane	Divine Comedy
2024
Coltrane	Caius Chorister	Sweet William
2023
Coltrane	Wise Eagle	El Habeeb
2022
Princess Zoe	Quickthorn	Enemy
2021
Stradivarius	Ocean Wind	Nayef Road

2020-2011
2019
Dee Ex Bee	Raymond Tusk	Cleonte
2018
Torcedor	Time To Study	Desert Skyline
2017
Sweet Selection	Prince Of Arran	Nearly Caught
2016
Mizzou	Clever Cookie	Flying Officer
2015
Mizzou	Vent De Force	Forever Now
2014
Tac De Boistron	Earth Amber	Oriental Fox
2013
Estimate	Caucus	Sir Graham Wade
2012
Colour Vision	Red Cadeaux	Thimaar
2011
Askar Tau	Akmal	Free Agent

2010–2001
2010
Illustrious Blue	Aajel	Electrolyser
2009
Patkai	Mischief Making	Baddam
2008
Shipmaster	Peppertree Lane	Distinction
2007
Tungsten Strike	Baddam	The Last Drop
2006
Cover Up	Tungsten Strike	Hearthstead Wings
2005
Alcazar	Franklins Gardens	Dubai Success
2004
Risk Seeker	Dusky Warbler	Millenary
2003
Alcazar	Savannah Bay	Pole Star
2002
Give Notice	Persian Punch	Double Honour
2001
Solo Mio	San Sebastian	Romantic Affair

2000–1991
2000
Orchestra Stall	Persian Punch	Celeric
1999
Celeric	Shaya	Canon Can
1998
Persian Punch	Busy Flight	Samraan
1997
Orchestra Stall	Wilawander	Election Day
1996
Double Trigger	Grey Shot	Always Aloof
1995
Double Trigger	Poltarf	Silence In Court
1994
Safety In Numbers	Cairo Prince	Arcadian Heights
1993
Roll A Dollar	Assessor	Spinning
1992
Al Mutahm	Supreme Choice	Shambo
1991
Teamster	Shambo	Double Dutch

1990–1988
1990
Teamster	Thethingaboutitis	Cossack Guard
1989
Travel Mystery	Mazzacano	Zaffaran
1988
Sergeyevich	Shimshek	Waterfield

The Sagaro Stakes is a Group 3 flat horse race in Great Britain open to horses aged four years or older. It is run over a distance of 1 mile 7 furlongs and 209 yards (3,209 metres) at Ascot in late April or early May.

== History ==
The event was formerly known as the Paradise Stakes, and it was originally held at Hurst Park. For a period it was contested by three-year-olds over 1¼ miles. It was later a race for older horses over 1 mile, 6 furlongs and 66 yards.

The Paradise Stakes continued to be staged at Hurst Park until 1962. It was transferred to Ascot in 1963, and temporarily switched to Newbury in 1964.

The race was renamed the Sagaro Stakes in 1978. It was named after Sagaro, the winner of Ascot's Gold Cup in each of the preceding three seasons.

The Sagaro Stakes was given Group 3 status in 1983. That year's edition was abandoned due to waterlogging, so it was first run as a Group race in 1984.

Since 2019 the official title has indicated that the race should be considered as a trial for the Ascot Gold Cup, run at the Royal Meeting at the same course (but a half mile further) in June.

Several winners of the Sagaro Stakes have won the Gold Cup in the same season. The most recent was Estimate in 2013.

The title Paradise Stakes is now assigned to a different race at Ascot, a 1-mile Listed event for older horses.

== Records ==
Most successful horse since 1978 (2 wins):

- Nicholas Bill – 1979, 1981
- Teamster – 1990, 1991
- Double Trigger – 1995, 1996
- Orchestra Stall – 1997, 2000
- Alcazar – 2003, 2005
- Mizzou – 2015, 2016
- Coltrane - 2023, 2024

Leading jockey since 1978 (5 wins):

- Frankie Dettori – Al Mutahm (1992), Give Notice (2002), Colour Vision (2012), Tac De Boistron (2014), Stradivarius (2021)

Leading trainer since 1978 (6 wins):

- Sir Michael Stoute – Shangamuzo (1978), Teamster (1990, 1991), Cover Up (2006), Patkai (2009), Estimate (2013)

== Winners since 1978 ==
Year	Winner	Age	Jockey	Trainer	Time
1978	Shangamuzo	5	Greville Starkey	Michael Stoute	3:52.57
1979	Nicholas Bill	4	Philip Waldron	Henry Candy	3:51.67
1980	Pragmatic	5	John Reid	Fulke Johnson Houghton	3:32.88
1981	Nicholas Bill	6	Philip Waldron	Henry Candy	3:47.93
1982	Castelnau	4	Pat Eddery	Paul Cole	3:31.23
1983	Abandoned due to waterlogging
1984	Gildoran	4	Steve Cauthen	Barry Hills	3:31.43
1985	Longboat	4	Willie Carson	Dick Hern	3:28.78
1986	Valuable Witness	6	Pat Eddery	Jeremy Tree	3:47.41
1987	Sadeem	4	Greville Starkey	Guy Harwood	3:25.29
1988	Sergeyevich	4	Willie Carson	John Dunlop	3:35.51
1989	Travel Mystery	6	Ray Cochrane	Martin Pipe	3:31.07
1990	Teamster	4	Pat Eddery	Michael Stoute	3:35.58
1991	Teamster	5	Pat Eddery	Michael Stoute	3:42.19
1992	Al Mutahm	4	Frankie Dettori	Jim Old	3:39.36
1993	Roll a Dollar	7	Brian Rouse	David Elsworth	3:42.36
1994	Safety in Numbers	4	Kevin Darley	Lady Herries	3:35.88
1995	Double Trigger	4	Jason Weaver	Mark Johnston	3:28.90
1996	Double Trigger	5	Jason Weaver	Mark Johnston	3:27.64
1997	Orchestra Stall	5	Richard Quinn	John Dunlop	3:29.69
1998 (Note: The 1998 and 2001 races were held at Newmarket)	Persian Punch	5	Kieren Fallon	David Elsworth	3:36.23
1999	Celeric	7	Richard Quinn	John Dunlop	3:37.46
2000	Orchestra Stall	8	Kevin Darley	John Dunlop	3:40.69
2001	Solo Mio	7	Michael Kinane	Amanda Perrett	3:23.75
2002	Give Notice	5	Frankie Dettori	John Dunlop	3:39.19
2003	Alcazar	8	Micky Fenton	Hughie Morrison	3:36.20
2004	Risk Seeker	4	Dominique Boeuf	Élie Lellouche	3:49.97
2005 (Note: The 2005 and 2006 editions took place at Lingfield Park)	Alcazar	10	Micky Fenton	Hughie Morrison	3:43.51
2006	Cover Up	9	Kieren Fallon	Sir Michael Stoute	3:34.68
2007	Tungsten Strike	6	Darryll Holland	Amanda Perrett	3:25.52
2008	Shipmaster	5	Richard Hughes	Alan King	3:42.22
2009	Patkai	4	Ryan Moore	Sir Michael Stoute	3:30.23
2010	Illustrious Blue	7	Jim Crowley	William Knight	3:29.08
2011	Askar Tau	6	George Baker	Marcus Tregoning	3:29.42
2012 (Note: The 2012 race was run at Kempton Park on an all-weather racetrack)	Colour Vision	4	Frankie Dettori	Saeed bin Suroor	3:21.50
2013	Estimate	4	Ryan Moore	Sir Michael Stoute	3:28.32
2014	Tac De Boistron	7	Frankie Dettori	Marco Botti	3:34.07
2015	Mizzou	4	William Buick	Luca Cumani	3:24.12
2016	Mizzou	5	Andrea Atzeni	Luca Cumani	3:30.40
2017	Sweet Selection	5	Silvestre de Sousa	Hughie Morrison	3:30.23
2018	Torcedor	6	Colm O'Donoghue	Jessica Harrington	3:36.51
2019	Dee Ex Bee	4	William Buick	Mark Johnston	3:24.97
2020 (Note: The 2020 race was run over 2 mile and 110 yards at Newcastle in June, due to the COVID-19 pandemic in the United Kingdom)	Nayef Road	4	Ben Curtis	Mark Johnston	3:34.63
2021	Stradivarius	7	Frankie Dettori	John and Thady Gosden	3:30.75
2022	Princess Zoe	7	Joey Sheridan	Tony Mullins	3:26.41
2023	Coltrane	6	Oisin Murphy	Andrew Balding	3:37.52
2024	Coltrane	7	Oisin Murphy	Andrew Balding	3:31.42
2025	Yashin	6	Callum Shepherd	Michael Bell	3:34.67
2026	Sweet William	7	Robert Havlin	John & Thady Gosden	3:24.97

== Paradise Stakes ==
- 1920: Comrade
- 1922: Blandford
- 1923: Portumna
- 1924: Frater
- 1925: Dignity
- 1926: Legatee
- 1927: Vanoc
- 1928: Lodore
- 1929: Horus
- 1930: Rear Admiral
- 1931: Hill Cat
- 1932: Robber Chief
- 1933: Town Crier
- 1934: Wychwood Abbot
- 1935: Whataday
- 1936: Noble Turk
- 1937: Lazybones
- 1938: Knole Star
- 1939: Time Step
- 1948: Mombasa
- 1949: Flush Royal
- 1951: Kelling
- 1955: Entente Cordiale
- 1956: Nucleus
- 1957: China Rock
- 1958: Sway
- 1959: Vacarme
- 1960: Parthia
- 1961: High Hat
- 1962: Pinzon
- 1963: Orchardist
- 1964: Oakville
- 1965: Anselmo
- 1966: Vivat Rex
- 1967: Mehari
- 1968: Parbury
- 1969: Fortissimo
- 1970: Precipice Wood
- 1971: Rock Roi
- 1972: Erimo Hawk
- 1973: Hakodate (Note: The 1973 winner Hakodate was previously named Talleyrand)
- 1974: Proverb
- 1975: Night in Town
- 1976: Marco Ricci
- 1977: Centrocon

== See also ==
- Horse racing in Great Britain
- List of British flat horse races
