= Doug Smith (jockey) =

Personal information
- Born: 21 November 1917
- Died: April 1989 (aged 71)
- Occupation: Jockey

Horse racing career
- Sport: Horse racing
- Career wins: 3,112

Major racing wins
- British Classic races: 1,000 Guineas Stakes (1946, 1959); 2,000 Guineas Stakes (1955, 1958); Other races Ascot Gold Cup (1949, 1950); Coronation Cup (1941); Dewhurst Stakes (1942, 1945, 1954, 1966); Goodwood Cup (1949, 1952, 1959); Middle Park Stakes (1949, 1954, 1955, 1958, 1963); St. James's Palace Stakes (1941, 1956, 1961, 1963); Sussex Stakes (1955)

Honours
- British flat racing Champion Apprentice (1937) British flat racing Champion Jockey (1954, 1955, 1956, 1958, 1959)

Significant horses
- Alycidon, Hypericum, Our Babu, Pall Mall, Petite Etoile, Sleeping Partner

Doug Smith (21 November 1917 – April 1989) was an English flat racing jockey and trainer. During his career he was champion jockey 5 times (1954, '55, '56, '58, '59) finishing second on the riders' list 7 times, riding a total of 3,112 winners. In addition he was champion apprentice in 1937.

His first winner was a horse called Denia at Salisbury in 1932. He quickly rose to prominence and by the end of World War II was among the leading jockeys in the country.

Doug Smith rode four classic winners – Hypericum (1,000 Guineas, 1946), Our Babu (2,000 Guineas, 1955), Pall Mall (2,000 Guineas, 1958) and Petite Etoile (1,000 Guineas, 1959) – and trained another one, Sleeping Partner (Epsom Oaks, 1969). He never won the Derby, but came third twice, first in a controversial finish on Swallow Tail in 1949, then on Acropolis in 1955.

Doug was well known as an outstanding rider of stayers. During his career he won the Doncaster Cup seven times, the Goodwood Cup three times, the Cesarewitch Handicap six times and the Ascot Gold Cup twice. He stated that Alycidon, winner of the Stayers' Triple Crown (rated 138 by Timeform, in the top 20 of their all-time ratings) was the best horse he ever rode.

For the last 21 years of his career he was retained by Lord Derby and could still ride at 7st 9lb at retirement.

Doug was brother to Eph Smith (1915–1972), who rode 2,313 winners in a riding career spanning 1933–1965. Their 5,425 winners make them the most prolific riding brothers in English racing history. In addition, he was son-in-law to Frederick N. Winter (champion apprentice in 1911) and brother-in-law of Fred Winter (multiple champion National Hunt jockey and trainer).

In 1989, he committed suicide by drowning himself in the swimming pool at his home in Newmarket. He was 71.

There is a road named after him in Newmarket, Suffolk "Doug Smith Close", intersecting with "Lester Piggott Way". His biography, Five Times Champion, (Pelham Books, London, 1968) was written in collaboration with Peter Willett.

== Bibliography ==
- "Encyclopedia of British Horseracing" Routledge
