= Goodwood Cup =

Flat horse race in Britain

- Class: Group 1
- Location: Goodwood Racecourse; W. Sussex, England
- Inaugurated: 1812
- Race type: Flat / Thoroughbred
- Sponsor: Al Shaqab
- Website: Goodwood

Race information
- Distance: 2 miles (3,219 metres)
- Surface: Turf
- Track: Left / right-handed
- Qualification: Three-years-old and up
- Weight: 8 st 12 lb (3yo); 9 st 12 lb (4yo+); Allowances; 3 lb for fillies and mares
- Purse: £500,000 (2025); 1st: £283,550

Goodwood Cup
2026
Scandinavia	Trawlerman	Rahiebb

Previous years
2025
Scandinavia	Illinois	Sweet William
2024
Kyprios	Sweet William	Gregory
2023
Quickthorn	Emily Dickinson	Coltrane
2022
Kyprios	Stradivarius	Trueshan
2021
Trueshan	Away He Goes	Sir Ron Priestley

2020-2011
2020
Stradivarius	Nayef Road	Santiago
2019
Stradivarius	Dee Ex Bee	Cross Counter
2018
Stradivarius	Torcedor	Idaho
2017
Stradivarius	Big Orange	Desert Skyline
2016
Big Orange	Pallasator	Sheikhzayedroad
2015
Big Orange	Quest For More	Trip To Paris
2014
Cavalryman	Ahzeemah	Brown Panther
2013
Brown Panther	Ahzeemah	Altano
2012
Saddler's Rock	Askar Tau	Colour Vision
2011
Opinion Poll	Lost In The Moment	Blue Bajan

2010-2001
2010
Illustrious Blue	Electrolyser	Purple Moon
2009
Schiaparelli	Mourilyan	The Betchworth Kid
2008
Yeats	Tungsten Strike	Sagara
2007
Allegretto	Veracity	Finalmente
2006
Yeats	Geordieland	Tungsten Strike
2005
Distinction	Golden Quest	Millenary
2004
Darasim	Royal Rebel	Misternando
2003
Persian Punch	Jardines Lookout	Savannah Bay
2002
Jardines Lookout	Give Notice	Charley Bates
2001
Persian Punch	Double Honour	Rainbow High

2000-1991
2000
Royal Rebel	Far Cry	San Sebastian
1999
Kayf Tara	Three Cheers	Jaseur
1998
Double Trigger	Canon Can	Celeric
1997
Double Trigger	Classic Cliche	Double Eclipse
1996
Grey Shot	Lear White	Persian Punch
1995
Double Trigger	Double Eclipse	Khamaseen
1994
Tioman Island	Ptoto	Arcadian Heights
1993
Sonus	Assessor	Arcadian Heights
1992
Further Flight	Witness Box	Landowner
1991
Further Flight	Great Marquess	Shambo

1990-1981
1990
Lucky Moon	Ecran	Kasayid
1989
Mazzacano	Sadeem	Princess Sobieska
1988
Sadeem	Spruce Baby	Vif-Argent
1987
Sergeyevich	El Conquistador	White Clover
1986
Longboat	Spicy Story	Petrizzo
1985
Valuable Witness	Kublai	Gildoran
1984
Gildoran	Ore	Karadar
1983
Little Wolf	Karadar	Santella Man
1982
Heighlin	Ore	Sheer Grit
1981
Ardross	Donegal Prince	Halsbury

1980-1971
1980
Le Moss	Ardross	New Jerusalem
1979
Le Moss	Arapahos	Nicholas Bill
1978
Tug of War	Arapahos	Shangamuzo
1977
Grey Baron	Bruni	Tug of War
1976
Mr Bigmore	Belfalas	Coed Cochion
1975
Girandole	Kambalda	T V Sunday
1974
Proverb	King Levanstell	Parnell
1973
Proverb	Brief Bay	Peacock
1972
Erimo Hawk	Parthian Plain	Hickleton
1971
Rock Roi	Golden Love	Random Shot

1970-1961
1970
Parthenon	Magna Carta	Tantivy
1969
Richmond Fair	Mustwyn	Coevers
1968
Ovaltine	Parbury	My Kuda
1967
Wrekin Rambler	Piaco	Parbury
1966
Gaulois	Vivat Rex	Bally Russe
1965
Apprentice	Soderini	Philemon
1964
Raise You Ten	Credo	Timber King
1963
Trelawny	Raise You Ten	Sannazaro
1962
Sagacity	Trelawny	Balto
1961
Predominate	Shatter	Agreement

1960-1957
1960
Exar	Predominate	Bel Baraka
1959
Dickens	French Beige	Sandiacre
1958
Gladness	Ranchiquito	Clichy
1957
Tenterhooks	Macip	Donald

The Goodwood Cup is a Group 1 flat horse race in Great Britain open to horses aged three years or older. It is run at Goodwood over a distance of 2 miles (3,219 metres), and it is scheduled to take place each year in late July or early August.

== History ==
The first version of the Goodwood Cup was established in 1808, and it was won on three separate occasions by Bucephalus. Its trophy, a silver cup, was awarded permanently to the horse's owner after the third victory. The replacement trophy was a gold cup, and the inaugural running for this took place in 1812. The race was originally contested over 3 miles, but it was later cut to 2 miles and 5 furlongs. Since 1991 the race has been run over 2 miles.

A number of foreign-bred horses won the Goodwood Cup in the mid-19th century. Early winners for France included Jouvence, Monarque and Flageolet, and the United States was represented by Starke. A notable overseas victory came from Kincsem, a Hungarian filly undefeated in a career of fifty-four races.

The present system of race grading was introduced in 1971, and the Goodwood Cup was initially classed at Group 2 level. It was relegated to Group 3 status in 1985. It was shortened by a furlong in 1990, and reduced to its current length the following year. It regained Group 2 status in 1995. In 2017 the status was raised again to Group 1 and the purse was increased from £300,000 to £500,000.

The Goodwood Cup is one of Britain's leading events for stayers – horses that specialise in racing over long distances. It is the second leg of the Stayers' Triple Crown, preceded by the Gold Cup and followed by the Doncaster Cup.

The race is now held on the opening day of the five-day Glorious Goodwood meeting.

== Records ==
Most successful horse (4 wins):

- Stradivarius – 2017, 2018, 2019, 2020

Leading jockey (5 wins):

- Jem Robinson – Fleur de Lis (1829), Glencoe (1834), Rockingham (1835), Beggarman (1840), Charles the Twelfth (1842)
- George Fordham – Baroncino (1855), Rogerthorpe (1856), Starke (1861), The Duke (1866), Border Minstrel (1883)
- Steve Donoghue – Queen's Square (1919), Mount Royal (1920), Bucks (1921), Cloudbank (1925), Brown Jack (1930)
- Lester Piggott – Gladness (1958), Exar (1960), Proverb (1974), Girandole (1975), Ardross (1981)
- Pat Eddery – Erimo Hawk (1972), Valuable Witness (1985), Mazzacano (1989), Sonus (1993), Grey Shot (1996)
- Frankie Dettori – Kayf Tara (1999), Schiaparelli (2009), Opinion Poll (2011), Stradivarius (2019, 2020)

Leading trainer (7 wins):

- John Scott – Hornsea (1836), Carew (1837), Charles the Twelfth (1841, 1842), Canezou (1849, 1850), Sweetsauce (1860)

== Winners since 1849 ==
Year	Winner	Age	Jockey	Trainer	Owner	Time
1849	Canezou	4		John Scott
1850	Canezou	5		John Scott
1851	Nancy	3
1852	Kingston	3
1853	Jouvence	3
1854	Virago	3	John Wells	John Barham Day	Henry Padwick
1855	Baroncino	3	George Fordham
1856	Rogerthorpe	3	George Fordham
1857	Monarque	5		Tom Jennings
1858	Saunterer	4
1859	The Promised Land	3
1860	Sweetsauce	3	John Charlton	John Scott	4th Earl Annesley
1861	Starke	6	George Fordham	R B Pryor	Richard Ten Broeck
1862	Tim Whiffler	3	Ralph Bullock	Thomas Dawson	Lord W Powlett
1863	Isoline‡	3	Tom French	James Godding	R C Naylor
1864	Dollar	4	John Kitchenar		Auguste Lupin
1865	Ely	4	Harry Custance	Tom Olliver	W S Cartwright
1866	The Duke	4	George Fordham	John Day	4th Marquess of Hastings
1867	Vauban	3	Harry Parry	John Day	8th Duke of Beaufort
1868	Speculum	3	Sam Kenyon	Mathew Dawson	6th Duke of Newcastle
1869	Restitution	4	John Daley	Joseph Hayhoe	Meyer de Rothschild
1870	Siderolite	4	John Wells	John Porter	Sir Joseph Hawley
1871	Shannon‡	3	William Hunt		F Mouncey
1872	Favonius	4	Charlie Maidment	Joseph Hayhoe	Meyer de Rothschild
1873	Flageolet	3	Henry Huxtable	Tom Jennings Sr.	C J Lefevre
1874	Doncaster	4	Fred Webb	Robert Peck	James Merry
1875	Aventuriere‡	4	Tom Chaloner	Alec Taylor Sr.	3rd Marquess of Ailesbury
1876	New Holland	4	Tom Cannon Sr.	Charles Blanton	Prince Soltykoff
1877	Hampton	5	Fred Webb	Robert Peck	F G Hobson
1878	Kincsem‡	4	E Madden	Robert Hesp	Ernő Blaskovich
1879	Isonomy	4	Tom Cannon Sr.	John Porter	Frederick Gretton
1880	Dresden China‡	4	James Snowden	William I'Anson	C Perkins
1881	Madame du Barry‡	6	James Snowden	William I'Anson	C Perkins
1882	Friday	5	Teddy Martin	Richard Marsh	12th Duke of Hamilton
1883	Border Minstrel	3	George Fordham	F Bates	J Johnstone
1884	St Simon	3	Charles Wood	Mathew Dawson	6th Duke of Portland
1885	Althorp	3	George Barrett	John Porter	Maurice de Hirsch
1886	The Bard	3	Charles Wood	Robert Peck	Robert Peck
1887	Savile	3	George Barrett	John Porter	1st Duke of Westminster
1888	Rada‡	3	Tommy Loates	Mathew Dawson	6th Viscount Falmouth
1889	Trayles	4	Jack Robinson	James Jewitt	W de la Rue
1890	Philomel‡	5	Tom Cannon Sr.	Robert Sherwood	J T North
1891	Gonsalvo	4	George Barrett	John Porter	J Gretton
1892	Martagon	5	John Watts	J Ryan	Douglas A Baird
1893	Barmecide	7	George Barrett	C Andrews	J Burton
1894	Kilsallaghan	4	Tommy Loates	James Jewitt	James Machell
1895	Florizel II	4	John Watts	Richard Marsh	Prince of Wales
1896	Count Schomberg	4	Mornington Cannon	William Leader	R Lebaudy
1897	Count Schomberg	5	Sam Loates	William Leader	R Lebaudy
1898	King's Messenger	3	Otto Madden	F Cole	Lord Penrhyn	5:23.00
1899	Merman	7	Charles Wood	Jack Robinson	Lady de Bathe	5:30.00
1900	Mazagan	4	Fred Rickaby	Harry Enoch	Douglas A Baird	5:00.80
1901	Fortunatus	3	Danny Maher	Richard Marsh	Arthur James	5:01.20
1902	Perseus	3	Joe Childs	Richard Marsh	Arthur James
1903	Rabelais	3	J Watts	Richard Marsh	Arthur James
1904	Saltpetre	4	William Lane	H Chandler	D Faber	4:57.60
1905	Red Robe	4	William Griggs	Richard Marsh	Arthur James
1906	Plum Tree	3	Otto Madden	Alec Taylor Jr.	Alfred W Cox
1907	The White Knight	4	William Halsey	Harry Sadler	W R Wyndham
1908	Radium	5	Otto Madden	John Watson	Leopold de Rothschild	4:51.00
1909	Carrousel	3	Charles Trigg	Felix Leach	H J King
1910	Magic	3	Fred Rickaby Jr	Felix Leach	H Beddington	4:54.80
1911	Kilbroney	4	Walter Griggs	Charles Waugh	Lord St David
1912	Tullibardine	4	Elijah Wheatley	Sam Darling	James Buchanan	4:58.80
1913	Catmint	4	Danny Maher	Tom Jennings Jr.	Leonard Brassey	4:48.60
1914	Son-in-Law	3	Frank Bullock	Reg Day	Abe Bailey	4:44.40
1915-18	No race
1919	Queen's Square‡	4	Steve Donoghue	Alec Taylor Jr.	Alexander Robb Cox
1920	Mount Royal	3	Steve Donoghue	Harvey Leader	Lady Cunliffe-Owen
1921	Bucks	3	Steve Donoghue	Reg Day	Abe Bailey	4:52.60
1922	Flamboyant	4	William Lister	Reg Day	Mrs G Robinson	4:48.80
1923	Triumph	4	Joe Childs	John Watson	Anthony de Rothschild	4:59.00
1924	Teresina‡	4	Vic Smyth	Dick Dawson	Aga Khan III	4:54.60
1925	Cloudbank	4	Steve Donoghue	G Laing Ward	J White	5:04.80
1926	Glommen	4	Harry Wragg	Walter Earl	Solomon Joel	4:55.40
1927	Dark Japan	4	Charlie Smirke	Dick Dawson	Aga Khan III	4:56.20
1928	Kinchinjunga	4	Freddie Fox	Richard Gooch	H C Sutton	4:55.60
1929	Old Orkney	5	Fred Lane	Richard Gooch	J Murphy	5:01.00
1930	Brown Jack	6	Steve Donoghue	Ivor Anthony	Harold Wernher	4:51.60
1931	Salmon Leap	4	Tommy Weston	George Lambton	Venetia James	5:14.60
1932	Brulette‡	4	Gordon Richards	Fred Darling	Lord Woolavington	5:16.60
1933	Sans Peine	3	Eph Smith	Jack Jarvis	Edward Esmond	4:44.60
1934	Loosestrife	5	Gordon Richards	E Richards	P Johnson	4:51.40
1935	Tiberius	4	Tommy Weston	Joe Lawson	Abe Bailey	4:51.80
1936	Cecil	5	Tommy Weston	Joseph Lawson	Abe Bailey	4:56.00
1937	Fearless Fox	4	Eph Smith	Jack Jarvis	A Smith	4:42.00
1938	Epigram	5	Brownie Carslake	Noel Cannon	James V Rank	4:50.80
1939	Dubonnet	4	Tommy Lowrey	Basil Jarvis	J P Hornung	4:57.60
1940-45	No race
1946	Marsyas	6	Charlie Elliott	Charles Semblat	Marcel Boussac	4:48.00
1947	Monsieur l'Amiral	6	Charlie Smirke	Elijah Charlier	Mrs I Henderson	4:53.40
1948	Tenerani	4	Enzo Camici	Norman Bertie	Federico Tesio	4:49.00
1949	Alycidon	4	Doug Smith	Walter Earl	18th Earl of Derby	4:44.00
1950	Val Drake	4	Roger Poincelet	Robert Carver	Suzy Volterra	5:06.00
1951	Pan	4	Roger Poincelet	Etienne Pollet	Eugène Constant	4:55.40
1952	Medway	4	Doug Smith	Fred Winter Sr.	P Bartholemew	5:15.00
1953	Souepi	5	Charlie Elliott	George Digby	George Digby	4:54.60
1954	Blarney Stone	5	Bill Rickaby	Vic Smyth	M McAlpine	4:59.20
1955	Double Bore	4	Tommy Gosling	Jeremy Tree	Jeremy Tree	4:42.40
1956	Zarathustra	5	Harry Carr	Cecil Boyd-Rochfort	Terence Grey	5:00.60
1957	Tenterhooks	3	Edgar Britt	Charles Elsey	3rd Viscount Allendale	4:54.40
1958	Gladness‡	5	Lester Piggott	Vincent O'Brien	John McShain	5:03.60
1959	Dickens	3	Doug Smith	Cecil Boyd-Rochfort	Zia Wernher	4:56.40
1960	Exar	4	Lester Piggott	Noel Murless	Carlo Vittadini	4:59.80
1961	Predominate	9	Eph Smith	Ted Leader	Jim Joel	4:51.60
1962	Sagacity	4	Harry Carr	Cecil Boyd-Rochfort	Lady Cholmondeley	4:39.80
1963	Trelawny	7	Scobie Breasley	George Todd	Mrs L Carver	4:50.60
1964	Raise You Ten	4	Stan Clayton	Cecil Boyd-Rochfort	P Widener	4:47.00
1965	Apprentice	5	Stan Clayton	Cecil Boyd-Rochfort	Queen Elizabeth II	5:11.60
1966	Gaulois	3	Ron Hutchinson	Cecil Boyd-Rochfort	Queen Elizabeth II	4:53.40
1967	Wrekin Rambler	4	Scobie Breasley	Gordon Richards	G Murphy	4:54.20
1968	Ovaltine	4	Brian Taylor	Jack Watts	G Cooper	4:59.20
1969	Richmond Fair	5	John Gorton	Bruce Hobbs	T Blackwell	4:47.40
1970	Parthenon	4	Greville Starkey	Henry Cecil	R Macdonald-Buchanan	4:49.80
1971	Rock Roi	4	Duncan Keith	Peter Walwyn	F Hue-Williams	4:54.20
1972	Erimo Hawk	4	Pat Eddery	Geoffrey Barling	Y Yamamoto	5:01.89
1973	Proverb	3	Ernie Johnson	Barry Hills	J Chandos-Pole	4:49.49
1974	Proverb	4	Lester Piggott	Barry Hills	J Chandos-Pole	4:56.51
1975	Girandole	4	Lester Piggott	Michael Stoute	J Hattersley	4:38.75
1976	Mr Bigmore	4	Greville Starkey	Peter Robinson	Ted Lambton	4:35.08
1977	Grey Baron	4	Geoff Lewis	Bruce Hobbs	P Parnell	4:38.75
1978	Tug of War	5	Brian Rouse	Dermot Whelan	Y Perry	4:39.23
1979	Le Moss	4	Joe Mercer	Henry Cecil	Carlo d'Alessio	4:57.95
1980	Le Moss	5	Joe Mercer	Henry Cecil	Carlo d'Alessio	4:39.45
1981	Ardross	5	Lester Piggott	Henry Cecil	Charles St George	4:41.13
1982	Heighlin	6	Steve Cauthen	David Elsworth	J Burr	4:42.56
1983	Little Wolf	5	Willie Carson	Dick Hern	Lord Porchester	4:32.28
1984	Gildoran	4	Steve Cauthen	Barry Hills	Robert Sangster	4:37.39
1985	Valuable Witness	5	Pat Eddery	Jeremy Tree	Stavros Niarchos	4:35.11
1986	Longboat	5	Willie Carson	Dick Hern	Dick Hollingsworth	4:46.98
1987	Sergeyevich	3	Willie Carson	John Dunlop	Mrs Douglas Riley-Smith	4:30.32
1988	Sadeem	5	Greville Starkey	Guy Harwood	Sheikh Mohammed	4:36.34
1989	Mazzacano	4	Pat Eddery	Guy Harwood	A P Ward	4:32.84
1990	Lucky Moon	3	Willie Carson	John Dunlop	Lavinia, Duchess of Norfolk	4:11.75
1991	Further Flight	5	Michael Hills	Barry Hills	Simon Wingfield Digby	3:28.69
1992	Further Flight	6	Michael Hills	Barry Hills	Simon Wingfield Digby	3:24.04
1993	Sonus	4	Pat Eddery	John Gosden	Sheikh Mohammed	3:35.36
1994	Tioman Island	4	Richard Quinn	Paul Cole	Sultan Ahmad Shah	3:23.57
1995	Double Trigger	4	Jason Weaver	Mark Johnston	Ron Huggins	3:25.86
1996	Grey Shot	4	Pat Eddery	Ian Balding	Jeff Smith	3:25.17
1997	Double Trigger	6	Michael Roberts	Mark Johnston	Ron Huggins	3:24.81
1998	Double Trigger	7	Darryll Holland	Mark Johnston	Ron Huggins	3:29.19
1999	Kayf Tara	5	Frankie Dettori	Saeed bin Suroor	Godolphin	3:23.67
2000	Royal Rebel	4	Michael Kinane	Mark Johnston	Peter Savill	3:31.71
2001	Persian Punch	8	Richard Quinn	David Elsworth	Jeff Smith	3:27.09
2002	Jardines Lookout	5	Michael Kinane	Alan Jarvis	Ambrose Turnbull	3:21.63
2003	Persian Punch	10	Martin Dwyer	David Elsworth	Jeff Smith	3:27.86
2004	Darasim	6	Joe Fanning	Mark Johnston	Markus Graff	3:26.93
2005	Distinction	6	Michael Kinane	Michael Stoute	Highclere Thoroughbred Racing	3:29.56
2006	Yeats	5	Michael Kinane	Aidan O'Brien	Sue Magnier & Diane Nagle	3:21.55
2007	Allegretto‡	4	Ryan Moore	Sir Michael Stoute	Cheveley Park Stud	3:25.61
2008	Yeats	7	Johnny Murtagh	Aidan O'Brien	Sue Magnier & Diane Nagle	3:25.75
2009	Schiaparelli	6	Frankie Dettori	Saeed bin Suroor	Godolphin	3:25.18
2010	Illustrious Blue	7	Jim Crowley	William Knight	Mr & Mrs I H Bendelow	3:22.35
2011	Opinion Poll	5	Frankie Dettori	Mahmood Al Zarooni	Godolphin	3:23.85
2012	Saddler's Rock	4	Johnny Murtagh	John Oxx	Michael O'Flynn	3:30.83
2013	Brown Panther	5	Richard Kingscote	Tom Dascombe	Andrew Black & Owen Promotions	3:22.79
2014	Cavalryman	8	Kieren Fallon	Saeed bin Suroor	Godolphin	3:27.07
2015	Big Orange	4	Jamie Spencer	Michael Bell	Bill Gredley	3:24.85
2016	Big Orange	5	Jamie Spencer	Michael Bell	Bill Gredley	3:24.93
2017	Stradivarius	3	Andrea Atzeni	John Gosden	Bjorn Nielsen	3:25.47
2018	Stradivarius	4	Andrea Atzeni	John Gosden	Bjorn Nielsen	3:30.56
2019	Stradivarius	5	Frankie Dettori	John Gosden	Bjorn Nielsen	3:29.11
2020	Stradivarius	6	Frankie Dettori	John Gosden	Bjorn Nielsen	3:35.07
2021	Trueshan	5	Hollie Doyle	Alan King	Singula Partnership	3:37.05
2022	Kyprios	4	Ryan Moore	Aidan O'Brien	Moyglare Stud / Smith / Magnier / Tabor	3:26.84
2023	Quickthorn	6	Tom Marquand	Hughie Morrison	Lady Blyth	3:33.65
2024	Kyprios	6	Ryan Moore	Aidan O'Brien	Moyglare Stud / Smith / Magnier / Tabor	3:21.53
2025	Scandinavia	3	Wayne Lordan	Aidan O'Brien	Tabor / Smith / Magnier	3:27.96
2026	Scandinavia	4	Ryan Moore	Aidan O'Brien	Tabor / Smith / Magnier	3:23.53

The race was not run from 1915 to 1918 because of World War I and from 1940 to 1945 because of World War II
‡ denotes a winning filly or mare

== Earlier winners ==
- 1812: Shoestrings
- 1813: Camerton
- 1814: Banquo
- 1815: no race
- 1816: Scarecrow
- 1817–24: no race
- 1825: Cricketer
- 1826: Stumps
- 1827: Link Boy
- 1828: Miss Craven
- 1829: Fleur de Lis
- 1830: Fleur de Lis
- 1831: Priam
- 1832: Priam
- 1833: Rubini
- 1834: Glencoe
- 1835: Rockingham
- 1836: Hornsea
- 1837: Carew
- 1838: Harkaway
- 1839: Harkaway
- 1840: Beggarman
- 1841: Charles the Twelfth
- 1842: Charles the Twelfth
- 1843: Hyllus
- 1844: Alice Hawthorn
- 1845: Miss Elis
- 1846: Grimston
- 1847: The Hero
- 1848: Van Tromp

== See also ==
- Horse racing in Great Britain
- List of British flat horse races
