= Doncaster Cup =

Flat horse race in Britain

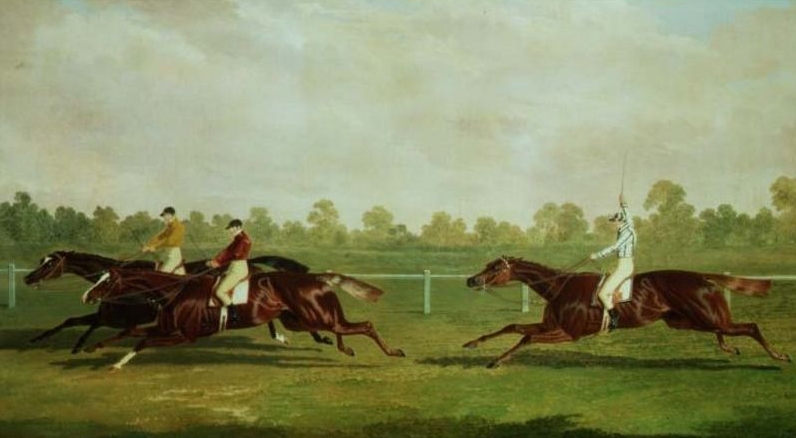
- Doncaster Gold Cup 1835 by John Frederick Herring, Sr.
- Class: Group 2
- Location: Doncaster Racecourse; Doncaster, England
- Inaugurated: 1766
- Race type: Flat / Thoroughbred
- Sponsor: Betfred
- Website: Doncaster

Race information
- Distance: 2m 1f 197y (3,600 metres)
- Surface: Turf
- Track: Left-handed
- Qualification: Three-years-old and up
- Weight: 8 st 10 lb (3yo); 9 st 7 lb (4yo+); Allowances; 3 lb for fillies and mares Penalties; 5 lb for Group 1 winners * 3 lb for Group 2 winners * * after 31 March 2025
- Purse: £150,000 (2025); 1st: £85,065

Doncaster Cup
2026
Caballo De Mar	Beylerbeyi	Ascending

Previous years
2025
Sweet William	Pendragon	Hipop De Loire
2024
Sweet William	Trueshan	Point Lonsdale
2023
Trueshan	Sweet William	Broome
2022
Coltrane	Trueshan	Lismore
2021
Stradivarius	Alerta Roja	Nayef Road

2020-2011
2020
Spanish Mission	Selino	The Grand Visir
2019
Stradivarius	Cleonte	Max Dynamite
2018
Thomas Hobson	Max Dynamite	Sheikhzayedroad
2017
Desert Skyline	Thomas Hobson	Sheikhzayedroad
2016
Sheikhzayedroad	Quest For More	St Michel
2015
Pallasator	Clondaw Warrior	Suegioo
2014
Estimate	Whiplash Willie	Kalann
2013
Times Up	High Jinx	Repeater
2012
Times Up	High Jinx	Hurricane Higgins
2011
Saddler's Rock	Opinion Poll	Motrice

2010-2001
2010
Samuel	Tastahil	Motrice
2009
Askar Tau	Darley Sun	Geordieland
2008
Honolulu	Balkan Knight	Royal And Regal
2007
Septimus	Geordieland	Allegretto
2006
Sergeant Cecil	Alcazar	Baddam
2005
Millenary	Sergeant Cecil	Kasthari
2004
Millenary	Kasthari	Dancing Bay
2003
Persian Punch	Dusky Warbler	Hugs Dancer
2002
Boreas	Persian Punch	Darasim
2001
Alleluia	Rainbow High	Bosham Mill

2000-1991
2000
Enzeli	Churlish Charm	Persian Punch
1999
Far Cry	Rainbow High	Celeric
1998
Double Trigger	Busy Flight	Canon Can
1997
Canon Can	Persian Punch	Further Flight
1996
Double Trigger	Celeric	Lear White
1995
Double Trigger	Further Flight	Old Rouvel
1994
Arcadian Heights	Quick Ransom	Further Flight
1993
Assessor	Further Flight	Jack Button
1992
Further Flight	Witness Box	Hieroglyphic
1991
Great Marquess	Morley Street	Haitham

1990-1981
1990
Al Maheb	Teamster	Regal Reform
1989
Weld	Thethingaboutitis	Ecran
1988
Kneller	Sadeem	Sergeyevich
1987
Buckley	Sadeem	Kudz
1986
Longboat	Petrizzo	The Prudent Prince
1985
Spicy Story	Bourbon Boy	Bespoke
1984
Wagoner	Petrizzo	Harly
1983
Karadar	Gildoran	Mountain Lodge
1982
Ardross	Heighlin	Santella Man
1981
Protection Racket	Heighlin	Donegal Prince

The Doncaster Cup is a Group 2 flat horse race in Great Britain open to horses aged three years or older. It is run at Doncaster over a distance of 2 miles 1 furlong and 197 yards (3,600 metres), and it is scheduled to take place each year in September.

== History ==
The event was established in 1766, and it was originally called the Doncaster Gold Cup. It pre-dates Doncaster's St. Leger Stakes by ten years, and is the venue's oldest surviving race. It was initially held at Cantley Common, and moved to its present location in 1776.

During the early part of its history the race was contested over 4 miles. It was shortened to 2 miles and 5 furlongs in 1825, and reduced to 2 miles and 2 furlongs in 1891. It was cut by another furlong in 1908, and restored to its previous length in 1927.

The present system of race grading was introduced in 1971, and for a period the Doncaster Cup was classed at Group 3 level. It was promoted to Group 2 in 2003.

The Doncaster Cup is one of Britain's leading events for "stayers" – horses which specialise in racing over long distances. It is the final leg of the Stayers' Triple Crown, preceded by the Gold Cup and the Goodwood Cup. The Doncaster Cup is the only British race where the winner has ballot-exempt entry to the Melbourne Cup.

The race is currently held on the second day of Doncaster's four-day St. Leger Festival.

== Records ==
Most successful horse (4 wins):

- Beeswing – 1837, 1840, 1841, 1842

Leading jockey (8 wins):

- Joe Mercer – Nick La Rocca (1953, dead-heat), Grey of Falloden (1964), The Accuser (1968), Biskrah (1972), Sea Anchor (1976), Buckskin (1978), Le Moss (1979, 1980)

(note: the jockeys of some of the early winners are unknown)

Leading trainer (7 wins):

- Cecil Boyd-Rochfort – Alcazar (1934), Black Devil (1935), Osborne (1954), Atlas (1956), Agreement (1958, 1959), Raise You Ten (1963)
- Sir Henry Cecil – Buckskin (1978), Le Moss (1979, 1980), Ardross (1982), Kneller (1988), Great Marquess (1991), Canon Can (1997)

(note: the trainers of some of the early winners are unknown)

== Winners since 1801 ==
Year	Winner	Age	Jockey	Trainer	Owner	Time
1801	Chance	4			P Wentworth
1802	Alonzo	4			C Brandling
1803	Remembrancer	3	Ben Smith	John Smith	10th Earl of Strathmore
1804	Sir Oliver	4			Lord Grey
1805	Caleb Quotem	3		C Scaife	4th Earl Fitzwilliam
1806	Camillus	3			W Garforth
1807	Scud	3			Lord Monson
1808	Laurel Leaf	3			T Duncombe
1809	Whitenose	3			Lord Milton
1810	Trophonius	3		Boyce	Lord Darlington
1811	Grimalkin	3			T Duncombe
1812	Slender Billy	4			J Glover
1813	Viscount	4		James Croft	Sir Willam Maxwell
1814	Tramp	4		Tommy Sykes	Richard Watt
1815	Catton	6			6th Earl of Scarbrough
1816	Filho da Puta	4		J. Scott	Thomas Houldsworth
1817	Fulford	5			Colonel King
1818	Rasping	5			6th Duke of Leeds
1819	Otho	7			William Garforth
1820	Juggler	5		Isaac Blades	T O Powlett
1821	Consul	5	H Edwards		J G Lambton
1822	Euphrates	6	Jem Robinson		J Dilly
1823	Figaro	4	Thomas Lye		A Farquharson
1824	Mercutio	5	H Edwards		6th Duke of Leeds
1825	Lottery	5	George Nelson		Mr Whittaker
1826	Fleur-de-Lis	4	George Nelson		Sir M W Ridley
1827	Mulatto	4	Thomas Lye		4th Earl Fitzwilliam
1828	Laurel	4	Thomas Nicholson		Major Yarburgh
1829	Voltaire	3	Thomas Lye	John Smith	Lord Darlington
1830	Retriever	4	Thomas Lye		Lord Kelburn
1831	The Saddler	3	Thomas Lye		Mr Wagstaff
1832	Galopade	4	Bob Johnson		R Riddell
1833	Rockingham	3	Thomas Nicholson	Richard Shepherd	Richard Watt
1834	Tomboy	5	Bob Johnson		William Orde
1835	Touchstone	4	William Scott	John Scott	1st Marquess of Westminster
1836	Touchstone	5	William Scott	John Scott	1st Marquess of Westminster
1837	Beeswing	4	D Cartwright	James Watson	Willam Orde
1838	Don John	3	Nat Flatman	John Scott	6th Earl of Chesterfield
1839	Charles the Twelfth	3	William Scott	John Scott	Major Yarburgh
1840	Beeswing	7	D Cartwright	James Watson	Willam Orde
1841	Beeswing	8	D Cartwright	James Watson	Willam Orde
1842	Beeswing	9	D Cartwright	James Watson	Willam Orde
1843	Alice Hawthorn	5	Robert Hesseltine Jr.	Robert Hesseltine Jr.	H Wormald
1844	Alice Hawthorn	6	J Burnby	Robert Hesseltine Jr.	G Salvin
1845	Sweetmeat	3	George Whitehouse	W Hadlow	A W Hill
1846	The Hero	3	Alfred Day	John Barham Day	John Barham Day
1847	War Eagle	3	Samuel Mann	Charles Marson	E Bouverie
1848	Chanticleer	5	Nat Flatman	William I'Anson	James Merry
1849	Canezou	4	Frank Butler	John Scott	Lord Stanley
1850	Voltigeur	3	Nat Flatman	Robert Hill	2nd Earl of Zetland
1851	The Ban	3	Josiah Arnold	Alec Taylor, Sr.	Sir Joseph Hawley
1852	Teddington	4	Job Marson	Alec Taylor, Sr.	John Massey Stanley
1853	Hungerford	5	John Charlton	W King	Meyer de Rothschild
1854	Virago	3	John Wells	John Barham Day	Henry Padwick
1855	Rataplan	5	Anthony Cowley	W Wyatt	C Thellusson
1856	Fandango	4	Job Marson	George Abdale	2nd Earl of Zetland
1857	Vedette	3	Tom Chaloner	George Abdale	2nd Earl of Zetland
1858	Vedette	4	John Osborne	George Abdale	2nd Earl of Zetland
1859	Newcastle	3	George Fordham	Joseph Dawson	7th Earl of Stamford
1860	Sabreur	3	Tom Chaloner	G Abdale	2nd Earl of Zetland
1861	Kettledrum	3	Ralph Bullock	George Oates	Charles Towneley
1862	Tim Whiffler	3	Ralph Bullock	T S Dawson	Lord W Powlett
1863	Macaroni	3	Tom Chaloner	James Godding	Richard Naylor
1864	General Peel	3	Harvey Covey	Thomas Dawson	5th Earl of Glasgow
1865	Ackworth	4	George Fordham	John Day	4th Marquess of Hastings
1866	Rama	3	Samuel Kenyon	W Goater	12th Earl of Westmorland
1867	Achievement	3	Samuel Kenyon	James Dover	Mark Pearson
1868	Mandrake	4	John Osborne	Thomas Dawson	J Johnstone
1869	Good Hope	3	William Gray	Thomas Dawson	J Johnstone
1870	Sornette	3	Tommy Handley	Charlie Pratt	Major Fridolin
1871	Shannon	3	William Hunt		F Mouncey
1872	Dutch Skater	6	George Fordham	T Jennings	C J Lefevre
1873	Uhlan	4	Charles Maidment	W Gilbert	H Savill
1874	Lily Agnes	3	William Chaloner		J Snarry
1875	Fraulein	5	Jem Goater	W Goater	Mr Gomm
1876	Craig Millar	4	Thomas Chaloner	Alec Taylor, Sr.	William Stirling Crawfurd
1877	Hampton	5	Frederic Webb	Robert Peck	R G Hobson
1878	Pageant	7	Tom Cannon	John Porter	Frederick Gretton
1879	Isonomy	4	Tom Cannon	John Porter	Frederick Gretton
1880	Dresden China	4	Jem Snowden	William I'Anson Jnr	C Perkins
1881	Petronel	4	Fred Archer	James Jewitt	8th Duke of Beaufort
1882	Retreat	5	Charles Wood	T Wadlow	3rd Earl of Bradford
1883	Thebais	5	Charles Wood	John Porter	Sir Frederick Johnstone
1884	Louis d'Or	7	Tom Cannon	Alfred Hayhoe	Leopold de Rothschild
1885	Hambledon	3	James Fagan	William I'Anson Jnr	William I'Anson Jnr
1886	The Bard	3	Charles Wood	Martin Gurry	Robert Peck
1887	Carlton	4	George Barrett	Alec Taylor, Sr.	Lord E Somerset
1888	Grafton	3	George Barrett	R Sherrard	Sir George Chetwynd
1889	Claymore	5	Frederic Webb	J Humphreys	3rd Earl Howe
1890	Tyrant	5	Thomas Joseph Calder	William Walters	A M Singer
1891	Queen's Birthday	4	John Watts	C Lund	Major Joicey
1892	Chesterfield	4	Charles Loates	C W Golding	J T Davies
1893	Prisoner	3	Morny Cannon	James Waugh	5th Earl Cadogan
1894	Sweet Duchess	3	Seth Chandley	Robert Sherwood	Sir R W Griffith
1895	Kilsallaghan	4	Morny Cannon	James Jewitt	James Machell
1896	Laodamia	6	E Hunt	Thomas Lewis	W W Fulton
1897	Winkfield's Pride	4	Morny Cannon	Jack Robinson	J C Sullivan
1898	Pinfold	3	Charles Wood	George Blackwell	Sir J Miller	3:28.40
1899	Calveley	4	Morny Cannon	John Porter	1st Duke of Westminster	4:10.20
1900	King's Courier	3	Lester Reiff	Enoch Wishard	John A. Drake	3:28.40
1901 (dh)	Merry Gal; Sidus	4; 4	Lester Reiff; Danny Maher	Jack Robinson	William Hall-Walker	3:40.00
1902	William the Third	4	Morny Cannon	John Porter	6th Duke of Portland	3:31.20
1903	Wavelet's Pride	6	Danny Maher	J D Edwards	J D Edwards
1904	Robert le Diable	5	William Lane	Dick Dawson	5th Earl of Carnarvon
1905	Bachelor's Button	6	Herbert Jones	Charles Peck	Solomon Joel
1906	Velocity	4	Danny Maher	Philip Peebles	Mrs H V Jackson
1907	Velocity	5	Herbert Jones	Philip Peebles	Mrs H V Jackson
1908	Radium	5	Otto Madden	John Watson	Leopold de Rothschild	3:36.40
1909	Amadis	3	Otto Madden	William Waugh	7th Viscount Falmouth	3:40.40
1910	Bronzino	3	Freddie Fox	Fred Pratt	J A de Rothschild
1911	Lemberg	4	Frank Wootton	Alec Taylor, Jr.	Alfred W. Cox
1912	Prince Palatine	4	Frank O'Neill	Henry Beardsley	Thomas Pilkington	4:02.60
1913	Long Set	6	William Higgs	James Batho	Solomon Joel	3:42.20
1914	Willbrook	3	Steve Donoghue	Colledge Leader	J Ryan	3:48.80
1919	Haki	7	Joe Childs	Alec Taylor, Jr.	2nd Viscount Astor	3:54.80
1920	Buchan	4	Frank Bullock	Alec Taylor, Jr.	2nd Viscount Astor
1921	Flamboyant	3	William Lister	Reg Day	Mrs G Robinson	3:43.80
1922	Devizes	5	Charlie Elliott	Jack Jarvis	Sir W Cooke	4:12.00
1923	Silurian	4	Tommy Weston	George Lambton	17th Earl of Derby	3:51.60
1924	Santorb	3	Steve Donoghue	J Rhodes	B Walker	4:25.00
1925	St Germans	4	Frank Bullock	Alec Taylor, Jr.	2nd Viscount Astor	3:41.60
1926	Bongrace	3	Freddie Fox	Jack Jarvis	5th Earl of Rosebery	3:54.00
1927	Bythorne	3	Tommy Weston	Frank Butters	17th Earl of Derby	4:04.40
1928	Pons Asinorum	6	Fred Winter Sr.	Walter Earl	Solomon Joel	4:26.00
1929	Athford	4	Michael Beary	Dick Dawson	W Barnett	3:54.60
1930	Brown Jack	6	Joe Childs	Ivor Anthony	Harold Augustus Wernher	4:10.00
1931	Singapore	4	Gordon Richards	Thomas Hogg	1st Baron Glanely
1932	Foxhunter	3	Gordon Richards	Jack Jarvis	E Esmond
1933	Colorado Kid	4	Gordon Richards	Victor Gilpin	G Loder	6:04.20
1934	Alcazar	3	Joe Childs	Cecil Boyd-Rochfort	W Woodward	3:54.00
1935	Black Devil	4	Joe Childs	Cecil Boyd-Rochfort	W Woodward	3:46.60
1936	Buckleigh	4	Gordon Richards	Thomas Hogg	1st Baron Glanely	3:56.60
1937	Haulfryn	4	Gordon Richards	G Metcalfe	F Minoprio	3:58.80
1938	Epigram	5	Brownie Carslake	Noel Cannon	J V Rank	4:03.20
1946	Marsyas	6	Charlie Elliott	Charles Semblat	Marcel Boussac	4:03.20
1947	Trimbush	7	Doug Smith	Percy Vasey	Mrs F Senior	3:47.60
1948	Auralia	5	Doug Smith	Reg Day	Mrs A Johnston	4:09.20
1949	Alycidon	4	Doug Smith	Walter Earl	17th Earl of Derby	3:57.20
1950	Aldborough	5	Doug Smith	Fulke Walwyn	Dorothy Paget	4:10.20
1951	Fast Fox	4	Freddie Palmer	P Carter	Baron G de Waldner	4:17.00
1952	Aquino	4	Gordon Richards	Sam Armstrong	Maharanee of Baroda	3:58.00
1953 (dh)	Souepi; Nick La Rocca	5; 4	Charlie Elliott; Joe Mercer	George Digby; Jack Colling	G Digby; F Williams	4:00.40
1954	Osborne	7	Harry Carr	Cecil Boyd-Rochfort	W P Wyatt	3:59.60
1955	Entente Cordiale	4	Doug Smith	George Colling	18th Earl of Derby	4:10.60
1956	Atlas	3	Harry Carr	Cecil Boyd-Rochfort	Queen Elizabeth II	4:00.40
1957	French Beige	4	Geoff Littlewood	Henry Peacock	R F Dennis	4:24.00
1958	Agreement	4	Doug Smith	Cecil Boyd-Rochfort	Queen Elizabeth II	4:01.60
1959	Agreement	5	Harry Carr	Cecil Boyd-Rochfort	Queen Elizabeth II	3:55.40
1960	Exar	4	Lester Piggott	Noel Murless	Carlo Vittadini	4:02.80
1961	Pandofell	4	Lester Piggott	F Maxwell	H W Daw	4:01.20
1962	Bonnard	4	Ron Hutchinson	Jack Clayton	Marchese della Rochetta	4:00.20
1963	Raise You Ten	3	Doug Smith	Cecil Boyd-Rochfort	P Widener	3:58.80
1964	Grey of Falloden	5	Joe Mercer	Dick Hern	3rd Viscount Astor	3:59.40
1965	Prince Hansel	5	David Yates	David Thom	J Barker	4:14.40
1966	Piaco	3	Taffy Thomas	Geoffrey Barling	M Watney	3:53.80
1967	Crozier	4	Frankie Durr	Peter Walwyn	A D G Oldrey	3:59.80
1968	The Accuser	4	Joe Mercer	Dick Hern	Lord Rotherwick	4:14.40
1969	Canterbury	4	Bill Williamson	Paddy Prendergast	J Olin	4:11.00
1970	Magna Carta	4	Geoff Lewis	Ian Balding	Queen Elizabeth II	4:02.80
1971	Rock Roi	4	Duncan Keith	Peter Walwyn	F Hue-Williams	4:00.50
1972	Biskrah	5	Joe Mercer	Scobie Breasley	Lady Beaverbrook	4:01.57
1973	Attica Meli	4	Geoff Lewis	Noel Murless	Louis Freedman	4:02.37
1974	Proverb	4	Willie Carson	Barry Hills	J Chandler-Freeman	4:18.30
1975	Crash Course	4	Tony Kimberley	Jeremy Hindley	Mrs J Hindley	4:00.15
1976	Sea Anchor	4	Joe Mercer	Dick Hern	Dick Hollingsworth	4:04.77
1977	Shangamuzo	4	Pat Eddery	Gavin Hunter	Mrs E Charles	4:03.13
1978	Buckskin	5	Joe Mercer	Henry Cecil	Daniel Wildenstein	3:54.41
1979	Le Moss	4	Joe Mercer	Henry Cecil	Carlo d'Alessio	3:56.91
1980	Le Moss	5	Joe Mercer	Henry Cecil	Carlo d'Alessio	4:01.08
1981	Protection Racket	3	John Lowe	Jeremy Hindley	Serge Fradkoff	3:52.70
1982	Ardross	6	Lester Piggott	Henry Cecil	Charles St George	3:54.24
1983	Karadar	5	Walter Swinburn	Michael Stoute	Aga Khan IV	3:59.59
1984	Wagoner	4	Tony Ives	Peter Walwyn	A D G Oldrey	4:00.90
1985	Spicy Story	4	Steve Cauthen	Ian Balding	Paul Mellon	3:56.38
1986	Longboat (Note: Petrizzo finished first in 1986, but he was relegated to second place following a stewards' inquiry)	5	Willie Carson	Dick Hern	Dick Hollingsworth	3:56.85
1987	Buckley	4	Ray Cochrane	Luca Cumani	Mrs A L Chapman	3:59.17
1988	Kneller	3	Pat Eddery	Henry Cecil	Charles St George	3:53.77
1989	Weld	3	Willie Carson	William Jarvis	9th Baron Howard de Walden	4:00.10
1990	Al Maheb	4	Michael Roberts	Alec Stewart	Hamdan Al Maktoum	4:01.05
1991	Great Marquess	4	Pat Eddery	Henry Cecil	Charles St George	3:56.03
1992	Further Flight	6	Michael Hills	Barry Hills	Simon Wingfield Digby	3:55.60
1993	Assessor	4	Richard Quinn	Richard Hannon Sr.	Bjorn Nielsen	4:03.84
1994	Arcadian Heights	6	Frankie Dettori	Geoff Wragg	John Pearce	3:57.32
1995	Double Trigger	4	Jason Weaver	Mark Johnston	R W Huggins	3:58.74
1996	Double Trigger	5	Frankie Dettori	Mark Johnston	R W Huggins	3:53.00
1997	Canon Can	4	Kieren Fallon	Henry Cecil	Canon Ltd	3:52.17
1998	Double Trigger	7	Darryll Holland	Mark Johnston	R W Huggins	3:55.92
1999	Far Cry	4	Kevin Darley	Martin Pipe	Nicky Chambers	3:56.01
2000	Enzeli	5	Johnny Murtagh	John Oxx	Aga Khan IV	3:52.90
2001	Alleluia	3	Jamie Mackay	Sir Mark Prescott	Sonia Rogers	3:58.16
2002	Boreas	7	Jamie Spencer	Luca Cumani	Aston House Stud	3:50.29
2003	Persian Punch	10	Martin Dwyer	David Elsworth	Jeff Smith	3:56.67
2004 (dh)	Kasthari; Millenary	5; 7	Johnny Murtagh; Richard Quinn	Howard Johnson; John Dunlop	Elliott Brothers; Neil Jones	3:51.86
2005	Millenary	8	Richard Quinn	John Dunlop	Neil Jones	3:51.15
2006 (Note: The 2006 running took place at York)	Sergeant Cecil	7	Frankie Dettori	Rod Millman	Terry Cooper	3:58.37
2007	Septimus	4	Johnny Murtagh	Aidan O'Brien	Smith / Magnier / Tabor	3:48.41
2008	Honolulu	4	Johnny Murtagh	Aidan O'Brien	Smith / Magnier / Tabor	4:03.40
2009	Askar Tau	4	Ryan Moore	Marcus Tregoning	Nurlan Bizakov	3:54.15
2010	Samuel	6	William Buick	John Gosden	Normandie Stud	3:52.99
2011	Saddler's Rock	3	Niall McCullagh	John Oxx	Michael O'Flynn	3:49.83
2012	Times Up	6	Eddie Ahern	John Dunlop	I H Stewart-Brown & M J Meacock	3:58.11
2013	Times Up	7	Ryan Moore	Ed Dunlop	I H Stewart-Brown & M J Meacock	3:59.09
2014	Estimate	5	Ryan Moore	Sir Michael Stoute	Queen Elizabeth II	3:55.91
2015	Pallasator	6	Andrea Atzeni	Mark Prescott	Qatar Racing	3:49.60
2016	Sheikhzayedroad	7	Martin Harley	David Simcock	Mohammed Jaber	3:52.97
2017	Desert Skyline	3	Silvestre de Sousa	David Elsworth	Benham / Whitford / Quinn / Quinn	3:51.88
2018	Thomas Hobson	8	Ryan Moore	Willie Mullins	Susannah Ricci	3:53.17
2019	Stradivarius	5	Frankie Dettori	John Gosden	Bjorn Nielsen	3:59.28
2020	Spanish Mission	4	William Buick	Andrew Balding	Team Valor & Gary Barber	3:55.84
2021	Stradivarius	7	Frankie Dettori	John & Thady Gosden	Bjorn Nielsen	3:53.02
2022	Coltrane	5	David Probert	Andrew Balding	Mick and Janice Mariscotti	4:01.03
2023	Trueshan	7	Hollie Doyle	Alan King	Singula Partnership	4:05.61
2024	Sweet William	5	Robert Havlin	John & Thady Gosden	Normandie Stud	3:54.17
2025	Sweet William	6	Robert Havlin	John & Thady Gosden	Normandie Stud	3:52.24
2026	Caballo De Mar	5	Oisin Murphy	George Scott	Victorious Forever	3:57.05

== Earlier winners ==
- 1766: Charlotte
- 1767: Meaburn
- 1768: Laura
- 1769: Tantrum
- 1770: Liberty
- 1771: Mark
- 1772: Mark
- 1773: Forester
- 1774: Juniper
- 1775: Juniper
- 1776: Tuberose
- 1777: Pilot
- 1778: Phocion
- 1779: Magnum Bonum
- 1780: Duchess
- 1781: Crookshanks
- 1782: Crookshanks
- 1783: Faith
- 1784: Phoenomenon
- 1785: Alexander
- 1786: Fairy
- 1787: Stargazer
- 1788: Bustler
- 1789: Tot
- 1790: Abba Thulle
- 1791: Young Traveller
- 1792: Overton
- 1793: Oberon
- 1794: Beningbrough
- 1795: Hambletonian
- 1796: Hambletonian
- 1797: Stamford
- 1798: Stamford
- 1799: Cockfighter
- 1800: Dion

* The 1901 and 1953 races were dead-heats and have joint winners.

== See also ==
- Horse racing in Great Britain
- List of British flat horse races
- Recurring sporting events established in 1766 – this race is included under its original title, Doncaster Gold Cup.
