= Longboat (horse) =

British-bred Thoroughbred racehorse

- Sire: Welsh Pageant
- Grandsire: Tudor Melody
- Dam: Pirogue
- Damsire: Reliance
- Sex: Stallion
- Foaled: 24 March 1981
- Country: United Kingdom
- Colour: Bay
- Breeder: Richard Hollingsworth
- Owner: Richard Hollingsworth
- Trainer: Dick Hern
- Record: 18: 9-3-3

Major wins
- Alycidon Stakes (1984); Sagaro Stakes (1985); Henry II Stakes (1986); Ascot Gold Cup (1986); Goodwood Cup (1986); Doncaster Cup (1986)

Awards
- Top-rated older stayer in Europe (1986); Timeform ratings: 97p (1983), 117 (1984, 1985), 120 (1986)

Longboat (24 March 1981 – ca. 1997) was a British Thoroughbred racehorse. A specialist over extreme distances, who produced his best form on fast ground, he completed the "Stayers' Triple Crown" in 1986 when he won the Ascot Gold Cup, Goodwood Cup and Doncaster Cup. In all he won nine of his eighteen races between October 1983 and September 1986, with his other major wins coming in the Alycidon Stakes, Sagaro Stakes and Henry II Stakes. He was exported to Australia where he was retired from racing following an injury. He proved a failure as a breeding stallion.

== Background ==
Longboat was a "lengthy, attractive" bay horse with no white markings bred by his owner Richard Dunbavin "Dick" Hollingsworth at his Arches Hall Stud in Hertfordshire. He was sired by Welsh Pageant, a one-mile specialist whose wins included the Lockinge Stakes, Queen Anne Stakes and Queen Elizabeth II Stakes. Longboat's dam Pirogue was a granddaughter of the Hollingsworth family's influential broodmare Felucca, whose other descendants included Bireme, Cut Above (St Leger Stakes), Sharp Edge (Irish 2000 Guineas), Bolas (Irish Oaks), Dash for Cash (Australian Guineas) and Daffodil (AJC Oaks). Pirogue herself also produced Sailor's Dance who won the Scottish Champion Hurdle.

The colt was sent into training with Dick Hern at West Ilsley in Berkshire, and was ridden in most of his races by the Scottish jockey Willie Carson.

== Racing career ==
=== 1983 & 1984: early career ===
On his only appearance as a two-year-old, Longboat finished second to Alphabatim in a twenty-one runner maiden race over one mile at Newmarket Racecourse in October. Timeform described him as "a useful colt in the making". In the following year he raced nine times, only once finishing out of the first three. He won a maiden race at Bath, a race over eleven furlongs at Kempton and a handicap race at Chester. In August he was moved up in class for the Listed Alycidon Stakes over one and a half miles at Goodwood Racecourse and won by two and a half lengths. On his final appearance of the year he finished second to the gelding Bedtime (also trained by Hern) in the Group Three Cumberland Lodge Stakes at Ascot Racecourse.

=== 1985: four-year-old season ===
Although his 1985 campaign was restricted to three races, Longboat established himself as one of the best horses in Europe over extreme distances. On his seasonal debut he was matched against the 1984 Ascot Gold Cup winner Gildoran in the Group Three Sagaro Stakes over two miles at Ascot in May. Carrying nine pounds less than his main rival, Longboat took the lead in the final furlong and won by a neck from Gildoran with the fast-finishing Spicy Story a further neck away in third. Later that month he was brought back in distance for the Yorkshire Cup, where he appeared unsuited by the soft ground and finished fourth behind Ilium, Old Country and Centroline. On 20 June at Royal Ascot, Longboat was one of twelve horses to contest the Group One Ascot Gold Cup over two and a half miles. Ridden by Carson he started the 9/1 third favourite behind Gildoran and Old Country on ground described as "good to firm". He raced in the middle of the field and began to make progress six furlongs from the finish but lost ground when his run was blocked with half a mile to run. Longboat made a good recovery and made progress throughout the last two furlongs but failed by half a length to catch Gildoran. Longboat had a hard race and did not show his best form in training after Ascot. He did not race again in 1985.

=== 1986: five-year-old season ===
The soft ground which prevailed in the early part of 1986 was thought unsuitable for Longboat, and he missed intended runs in the Sagaro Stakes and the Yorkshire Cup. When he did eventually appear he was not given a hard race as he finished sixth in the Aston Park Stakes over thirteen furlongs at Newbury Racecourse. Longboat was never officially beaten again. Nine days after his run at Newbury, and racing on faster ground, he contested the Group Three Henry II Stakes over two miles at Sandown Park. He was among the leaders from the start and drew clear in the closing stages to win by two and a half lengths from Seismic Wave and Eastern Mystic.

On 19 June Longboat was made the even money favourite against ten opponents in the Ascot Gold Cup. Racing on his favoured firm ground, he took the lead half a mile from the finish and was never challenged, winning by five lengths from Eastern Mystic, who beat Spicy Story by a head for second place. Timeform were of the opinion that the field had been an unusually poor one, but praised the winner's "game and genuine" performance and admitted that he won in "tremendous style". On his next appearance Longboat was made the 1/3 favourite for the Goodwood Cup, which was then run over a distance of two miles and five furlongs. Carson sent him into the lead soon after the start and he was never in any danger of defeat, winning easily by ten lengths from Spicy Story, who was in turn well clear of the remainder of the field. In September Longboat attempted to complete the "Stayers' Triple Crown" in the Doncaster Cup in which he was expected to be challenged by the six-year-old gelding Valuable Witness in an "eagerly awaited clash" of the country's two best stayers. When Valuable Witness was withdrawn on the day of the race Longboat started at odds of 1/5 against three opponents. A major upset appeared to occur, as he was beaten a short head by Petrizzo, a horse he had defeated easily in his last three races. The racecourse stewards, however, judged that Petrizzo had caused interference to his rival in the closing stages and awarded the race to Longboat. It was subsequently announced that the favourite had sustained a muscle injury during the race.

== Assessment ==
In 1983 the independent Timeform organisation gave Longboat a rating of 97p, the "p" indicating that he was likely to improve. The prediction proved correct as he was given a rating of 117 in the following year. In the official 1984 handicap for three-year-olds racing in the United Kingdom he was given a rating of 75, 23 pounds below the top-rated El Gran Senor. Longboat maintained his Timeform rating at 117 in 1985, but did not appear in the official International Classification for older horses, which was headed by Rainbow Quest. Longboat achieved a peak Timeform rating of 120 in 1986, and was also rated the best European older horse at distances of fourteen furlong plus.

In their book A Century of Champions, based on a modified version of the Timeform system, John Randall and Tony Morris rated Longboat as a "poor" winner of the Gold Cup.

== Retirement and stud ==
In January 1987, Longboat was sold for an undisclosed sum to Kerry Packer and Lloyd Williams and was exported to Australia with the Melbourne Cup at his objective. The horse sustained a serious injury soon after his arrival and was retired to Packer's private stud at Ellerston. In eleven years at stud he sired only 59 registered foals, none of whom were of any consequence as racehorses.

== Pedigree ==
Pedigree of Longboat (GB), bay horse, 1981
Sire Welsh Pageant (FR) 1966	Tudor Melody (GB); 1956	Tudor Minstrel	Owen Tudor
Sire Welsh Pageant (FR) 1966	Tudor Melody (GB); 1956	Tudor Minstrel	Sansonnet
Sire Welsh Pageant (FR) 1966	Tudor Melody (GB); 1956	Matelda	Dante*
Sire Welsh Pageant (FR) 1966	Tudor Melody (GB); 1956	Matelda	Fairly Hot
Sire Welsh Pageant (FR) 1966	Picture Light (FR); 1954	Court Martial	Fair Trial
Sire Welsh Pageant (FR) 1966	Picture Light (FR); 1954	Court Martial	Instantaneous
Sire Welsh Pageant (FR) 1966	Picture Light (FR); 1954	Double Deal	Borealis
Sire Welsh Pageant (FR) 1966	Picture Light (FR); 1954	Double Deal	Picture Play*
Dam Pirogue (GB) 1971	Reliance (FR); 1962	Tantieme	Deux-Pour-Cent
Dam Pirogue (GB) 1971	Reliance (FR); 1962	Tantieme	Terka
Dam Pirogue (GB) 1971	Reliance (FR); 1962	Relance	Relic
Dam Pirogue (GB) 1971	Reliance (FR); 1962	Relance	Polaire
Dam Pirogue (GB) 1971	Cutter (GB); 1955	Donatello*	Blenheim*
Dam Pirogue (GB) 1971	Cutter (GB); 1955	Donatello*	Delleana*
Dam Pirogue (GB) 1971	Cutter (GB); 1955	Felucca	Nearco*
Dam Pirogue (GB) 1971	Cutter (GB); 1955	Felucca	Felsetta (Family: 11-d)

* Longboat is inbred 5S x 3D to the stallion Donatello, meaning that he appears fifth generation (via Picture Play) on the sire side of his pedigree, and third generation on the dam side of his pedigree.

* Longboat is inbred 5S x 4D to the stallion Nearco, meaning that he appears fifth generation (via Dante) on the sire side of his pedigree, and fourth generation on the dam side of his pedigree.
