= Double Trigger =

Irish-bred Thoroughbred racehorse

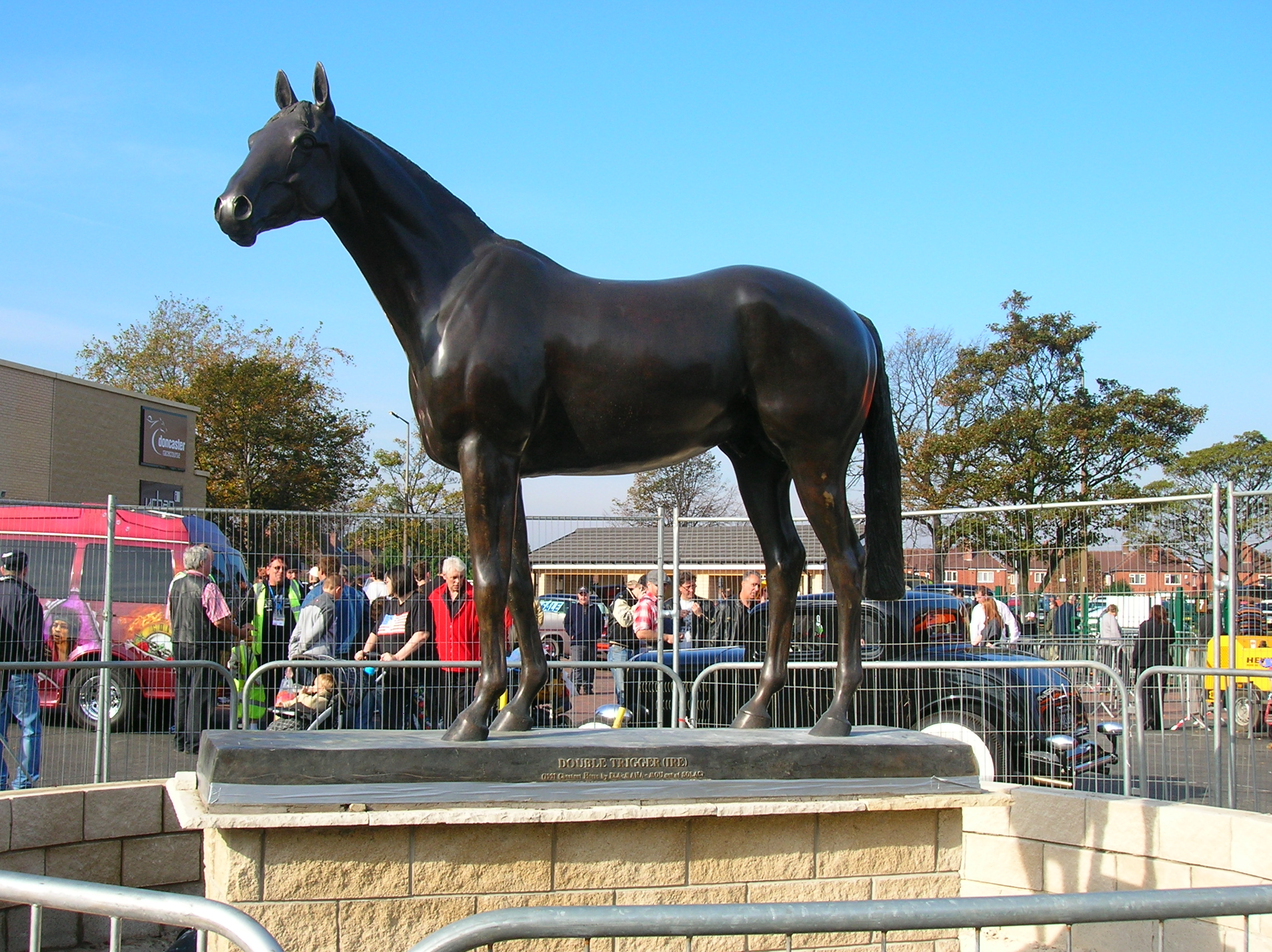
- Bronze statue of Double Trigger at Doncaster Racecourse in Doncaster, South Yorkshire, England.
- Sire: Ela-Mana-Mou
- Grandsire: Pitcairn
- Dam: Solac
- Damsire: Gay Lussac
- Sex: Stallion
- Foaled: 24 March 1991
- Died: 23 February 2020 (aged 28)
- Country: Ireland
- Colour: Chestnut
- Breeder: Dene Investments
- Owner: R W Huggins
- Trainer: Mark Johnston
- Record: 29: 14-2-1
- Earnings: £559,102

Major wins
- Zetland Stakes 1993; St Leger Italiano 1994; Sagaro Stakes 1995, 1996; Henry II Stakes 1995, 1996; Ascot Gold Cup 1995; Doncaster Cup 1995, 1996, 1998; Goodwood Cup 1995, 1997, 1998

Awards
- Top European Stayer 1995
- Last updated on 28 February 2020

Double Trigger (24 March 1991 – 23 February 2020) was a Thoroughbred racehorse and active sire. He was bred in Ireland, but trained in the United Kingdom throughout his racing career, which lasted from 1993 to 1998. A specialist stayer, he is best known for winning twelve group races, including the Stayers' Triple Crown in 1995.

== Background ==
Double Trigger was bred in Ireland, a son of the King George VI and Queen Elizabeth Stakes winner Ela-Mana-Mou. His dam was the French-bred mare Solac, who also produced Double Trigger's full brother, the top-class stayer Double Eclipse. He was trained throughout his career by Mark Johnston in North Yorkshire. His most regular jockey was Jason Weaver, who rode him in 21 of his 29 starts. He was an easily recognisable horse, being a light chestnut with a broad white blaze and a front-running racing style.

== Racing career ==
=== 1993–1994:early career ===
Double Trigger showed himself to be a promising horse from the start, following a ten-length win in a Redcar maiden in September 1993 with a victory in the Listed Zetland Stakes at Newmarket a month later.

His three-year-old career was delayed by injury problems, but when he did re-appear, he was immediately tested at the highest level. A fifth place in the Great Voltigeur Stakes at York was followed by a third in the St. Leger Stakes. He then embarked on a brief international campaign, "easily" winning the St Leger Italiano (then a Group 3 race) and finishing seventh of fourteen to Red Bishop in the inaugural Hong Kong Vase.

=== 1995:four-year-old season ===
Although Double Trigger was obviously Group class over middle-distances, his connections realised that he had the stamina for longer distances, and he was campaigned accordingly from then on.

In 1995 he was a Champion Stayer, winning the Sagaro and Henry II Stakes in spring before taking the Stayers' Triple Crown of the Ascot, Goodwood and Doncaster Cups. Although his best performance was probably at Ascot, where he beat the St Leger winner Moonax by five lengths, his Goodwood triumph was even more notable, as he prevailed by a neck over his full brother Double Eclipse in a "thrilling" finish. Johnston called it "a hell of a performance."

At the end of the season he was sent to Australia, where he went off 7-2 favourite for the Melbourne Cup under top weight of 9 stone 7 pounds. He ran very poorly and finished seventeenth of the twenty runners. Tests carried out after the race revealed no signs of "doping" and Johnston admitted that the performance was "a mystery".

=== 1996–1998:later career ===
Double Trigger was never quite so dominant again, but he continued to produce in top-class performances for the next three years. In 1996 he recorded his second win in the Henry II Stakes after being pushed along all the way and catching Grey Shot close to the finish. He added a repeat victory in the Sagaro Stakes, but was beaten by Classic Cliche in the Ascot Gold Cup. He had been affected by a hoof injury before the Ascot race, and the problem recurred, ruling him out of the Goodwood meeting. He returned in September to beat Celeric in the Doncaster Cup showing, according to Greg Wood writing in the Independent, "all his famous swagger and resolution" .

His 1997 campaign was his least successful and he began with two of his worst performances, finishing unplaced in both the Sagaro Stakes and the Gold Cup (won by Celeric), leading some to conclude that he was no longer a threat in major races. He did, however, produce one excellent performance to win his second Goodwood Cup, setting a "fierce pace" from the start and beating Classic Cliche by one and a half lengths.

In his final year (1998) he proved almost as good as ever, narrowly failing to defeat Kayf Tara in the Ascot Gold Cup, before adding a third win in the Goodwood Cup. In his final start he led from the start in what Johnston described as "classical Double Trigger" style, and stayed on to hold off the late challenge of Busy Flight and win a third Doncaster Cup. The horse received an enthusiastic reception from his home crowd and his trainer praised him, saying "Over two miles at his best, Double Trigger is one of the best there has been".

A plan to run in the Prix du Cadran was abandoned and was then retired to stud.

== Major wins ==
| Date | Race | Dist (f) | Course | Class | Prize (£K) | Odds | Runners | Margin | Runner-up | Time | Jockey | Trainer |
|---|---|---|---|---|---|---|---|---|---|---|---|---|
| 10 September 1998 | Doncaster Cup | 18 | Doncaster | 3 | 20 | 9-4 | 6 | 1 | Busy Flight | 3:50.92 | Darryll Holland | Mark Johnston |
| 12 September 1996 | Doncaster Cup | 18 | Doncaster | 3 | 19 | Evens | 6 | 2 | Celeric | 3:53.00 | Frankie Dettori | Mark Johnston |
| 7 September 1995 | Doncaster Cup | 18 | Doncaster | 3 | 21 | 4-11 | 6 | 3 | Further Flight | 3:58.74 | Jason Weaver | Mark Johnston |
| 30 July 1998 | Goodwood Cup | 16 | Goodwood | 2 | 40 | 11-2 | 9 | 0.75 | Canon Can | 3:29.19 | Darryll Holland | Mark Johnston |
| 31 July 1997 | Goodwood Cup | 16 | Goodwood | 2 | 38 | 16-1 | 10 | 1.5 | Classic Cliche | 3:24.81 | Michael Roberts | Mark Johnston |
| 27 July 1995 | Goodwood Cup | 16 | Goodwood | 2 | 36 | 2-1 | 9 | Neck | Double Eclipse | 3:25.86 | Jason Weaver | Mark Johnston |
| 27 May 1996 | Henry II Stakes | 16 | Sandown | 3 | 25 | 5-6 | 5 | 7 | Assessor | 3:41.15 | Jason Weaver | Mark Johnston |
| 29 May 1995 | Henry II Stakes | 16 | Sandown | 3 | 25 | 5-4 | 7 | 6 | Old Rouvel | 3:33.01 | Jason Weaver | Mark Johnston |
| 1 May 1996 | Sagaro Stakes | 16 | Ascot | 3 | 25 | 11-8 | 7 | Head | Grey Shot | 3:27.64 | Jason Weaver | Mark Johnston |
| 3 May 1995 | Sagaro Stakes | 16 | Ascot | 3 | 25 | 9-2 | 7 | Head | Poltarf | 3:28.90 | Jason Weaver | Mark Johnston |
| 22 June 1995 | Gold Cup | 20 | Ascot | 1 | 111 | 9-4 | 7 | 5 | Moonax | 4:20.25 | Jason Weaver | Mark Johnston |
| 4 November 1994 | Leger Italiano | 15 | Turin | 3 | 30 | 11-8 | 6 | 3.5 | Michel Georges | 3:20.80 | Jason Weaver | Mark Johnston |
| 30 October 1993 | Zetland Stakes | 10 | Newmarket | Listed | 8 | 3-1 | 10 | 1.5 | Barbaroja | 2:07.84 | Jason Weaver | Mark Johnston |

== Assessment ==
Double Trigger won the Cartier Racing Award for Top European Stayer in 1995. He was given a rating of 123 by Timeform.

He has been honoured with a bronze statue at Doncaster Racecourse.

Assessing Double Trigger in the Racing Post Tony Morris wrote

Few horses in history have displayed in such full measure the class, courage, stamina and durability that were his hallmarks.

== Stud career ==
Like many stayers, Double Trigger struggled to attract top quality mares at stud. He had some success with jumpers, his most notable winner being Russian Trigger, winner of the Midlands Grand National. He died at the age of 29 of a suspected heart attack at Clarendon Farm Stud in Wiltshire in February 2020. Mark Johnston said "It seems that, no matter what champions I trained or might be lucky enough to train in future, I will always be remembered more for having trained Double Trigger than for anything else. He captured the public's imagination like no other animal that I have been associated with, and rightly so".

== Pedigree ==
Pedigree of Double Trigger (IRE), chestnut stallion, 1991
| Sire Ela-Mana-Mou (IRE) 1976 | Pitcairn; 1971 | Petingo | Petition |
| Sire Ela-Mana-Mou (IRE) 1976 | Pitcairn; 1971 | Petingo | Alcazar |
| Sire Ela-Mana-Mou (IRE) 1976 | Pitcairn; 1971 | Border Bounty | Bounteous |
| Sire Ela-Mana-Mou (IRE) 1976 | Pitcairn; 1971 | Border Bounty | B Flat |
| Sire Ela-Mana-Mou (IRE) 1976 | Rose Bertin; 1970 | High Hat | Hyperion |
| Sire Ela-Mana-Mou (IRE) 1976 | Rose Bertin; 1970 | High Hat | Madonna |
| Sire Ela-Mana-Mou (IRE) 1976 | Rose Bertin; 1970 | Wide Awake | Major Portion |
| Sire Ela-Mana-Mou (IRE) 1976 | Rose Bertin; 1970 | Wide Awake | Wake Island |
| Dam Solac (FR) 1977 | Gay Lussac; 1969 | Fabergé | Princely Gift |
| Dam Solac (FR) 1977 | Gay Lussac; 1969 | Fabergé | Spring Offensive |
| Dam Solac (FR) 1977 | Gay Lussac; 1969 | Green As Grass | Red God |
| Dam Solac (FR) 1977 | Gay Lussac; 1969 | Green As Grass | Greensward |
| Dam Solac (FR) 1977 | Soragna; 1965 | Orvieto | Machiero |
| Dam Solac (FR) 1977 | Soragna; 1965 | Orvieto | Fior d'Orchidea |
| Dam Solac (FR) 1977 | Soragna; 1965 | Savigny | Mistral |
| Dam Solac (FR) 1977 | Soragna; 1965 | Savigny | Sernaglia (Family: 19-b) |

== Namesake ==
In September 1999, train operator Great North Eastern Railway named locomotive 91022 at Doncaster railway station after the horse.
