= Le Moss =

Irish-bred Thoroughbred racehorse (1975–2000)

- Le Moss as a yearling
- Sire: Le Levanstell
- Grandsire: Le Lavandou
- Dam: Feemoss
- Damsire: Ballymoss
- Sex: Stallion
- Foaled: 3 April 1975
- Country: Ireland
- Colour: Chestnut
- Breeder: McGrath Trust Company
- Owner: Carlo d'Alessio
- Trainer: Henry Cecil
- Record: 15:11-2-0

Major wins
- Queen's Vase (1978); March Stakes (1978); Ascot Gold Cup (1979, 1980); Goodwood Cup (1979, 1980); Doncaster Cup (1979, 1980)

Awards
- Timeform top-rated older horse (1980); Timeform: rating 135
- Last updated on 20 June 2025

Le Moss (3 April 1975 – 17 August 2000) was an Irish-bred, British-trained Thoroughbred racehorse and sire. A specialist stayer, he excelled at distances of two miles and beyond, winning eleven times from fifteen races between 1977 and 1980. He showed good form as a three-year-old, winning the Queen's Vase and finishing second in the classic St Leger, but reached his peak as an older horse. In 1979 he completed the "Stayers' Triple Crown" by winning the Ascot Gold Cup, Goodwood Cup and Doncaster Cup. He won the same three races as a five-year-old, becoming the only horse to achieve this feat twice. At stud Le Moss had some success as a sire of steeplechasers.

== Background ==
Le Moss was a chestnut horse with a narrow white blaze and three white socks bred in Ireland by the McGrath Trust Company, a family breeding operation run by Joseph McGrath. His sire was the McGrath-owned Le Levanstell, who won the Sussex Stakes and the Queen Elizabeth II Stakes in 1961 before a successful stud career. Le Moss's dam, Feemoss came from a strong staying family, being a daughter of the Yorkshire Oaks winner Feevagh and a half-sister to the Queen Alexandra Stakes winner Laurence O. Feemoss had previously produced the Prix de l'Arc de Triomphe winner Levmoss and the Prix de Diane winner Sweet Mimosa, both of which were also by Le Levanstell and therefore a full-brother and full-sister to Le Moss.

As a yearling, Le Moss was sent to the sales and was bought for 26,000 guineas by representatives of the Italian lawyer Carlo d'Alessio. During his racing career, Le Moss carried d'Alessio's red, white and green racing silks and was trained by Henry Cecil at his Warren Place Stables in Newmarket, Suffolk. He proved a difficult horse to train: Joe Mercer, Le Moss' main jockey, called him "cantankerous"; but on the racecourse the horse gave his all, Mercer considering him "very brave, and once he got his head in front very little would pass him".

Racing silks of Carlo d'Alessio

== Racing career ==
=== 1978: three-year-old season ===
After finishing unplaced on his only race as a two-year-old, Le Moss was a "very impressive" winner of a maiden race at Newmarket Racecourse on his first appearance in 1978. He established himself as one of the leading stayers of his generation at Royal Ascot in June when he was ridden by Geoff Baxter to win the Queen's Vase over two miles at odds of 7/4. The following month, again ridden by Baxter, he defeated the mighty Sea Pigeon in the valuable Tennent Trophy over one mile and seven furlongs at Ayr. Re-united with stable jockey Mercer in August, he was an impressive winner of the March Stakes over one and three-quarter miles at Goodwood prior to tackling the final classic of the season, the St Leger Stakes at Doncaster, a race in which he finished second of the fourteen runners, one and a half lengths behind the 28/1 outsider Julio Mariner.

=== 1979: four-year-old season ===
Le Moss began his four-year-old season by beating two opponents in the Lymm Stakes over two miles at Haydock Park in May. He was then sent to Royal Ascot in June, where he was ridden by Lester Piggott in the Ascot Gold Cup over two and a half miles. He started at odds of 7/4 and won by seven lengths from his six-year-old stable companion Buckskin who started favourite. With Mercer back in the saddle, he then won the Goodwood Cup over two miles five furlongs and completed the Stayers' Triple Crown by winning the Doncaster Cup over two and a quarter miles in September.

=== 1980: five-year-old season ===
In early 1980, Le Moss sustained an injury and could not be galloped, being instead brought back to fitness by a programme of swimming. He did not appear until Royal Ascot where he started the 3/1 favourite to retain the Gold Cup. Ridden by Joe Mercer, he led from the start and repelled the persistent challenge of the Irish-trained four-year-old Ardross to win by three-quarters of a length. In the Goodwood Cup, Le Moss started 4/7 favourite, despite being required to concede two pounds to Ardross. In a repeat of their Ascot clash, Le Moss and Ardross dominated the closing stages of the race, with the older horse winning by a neck. The pair met for a third time in the Doncaster Cup. Le Moss led from the start and completed his second Cup hat-trick, again beating his rival by a neck.

On his final appearance he was sent to France to contest the Prix Gladiateur over 4000 metres. He failed to reproduce his best form when finishing a half-a-length second to the filly Anifa who was in receipt of 10lbs. Mercer blamed himself for the defeat, admitting afterwards that he did not set a strong enough gallop and thereby placing more of an emphasis on stamina, his mount's greatest attribute.

Le Moss's full race record is listed below.

Date	Racecourse	Distance	Race	Jockey	Weight	Going	Odds	Field	Result	Margin
19 Oct 77	Sandown	1 mile	2-y-o Maiden	J Mercer	9-0	Good	8/1	24	7th	6 lengths
20 May 78	Newmarket	1 3/4 miles	3-y-o Maiden	J Mercer	9-0	Good	5/2jf	13	1st	7 lengths
21 Jun 78	Royal Ascot	2 miles	Queen's Vase (G3)	G Baxter	8-0	Firm	7/4f	12	1st	Head
17 Jul 78	Ayr	1m 7f	Tennent Trophy (H'cap)	G Baxter	8-2	Firm	7/4f	7	1st	Neck
26 Aug 78	Goodwood	1 3/4 miles	March Stakes	J Mercer	9-5	Firm	5/2	5	1st	2 lengths
16 Sep 78	Doncaster	1m 6 1/2f	St. Leger Stakes (G1)	J Mercer	9-0	Good	9/1	14	2nd	1 1/2 lengths
26 May 79	Haydock	2 miles	Lymm Stakes	J Mercer	9-5	Soft	1/2f	3	1st	2 1/2 lengths
21 Jun 79	Royal Ascot	2 1/2 miles	Ascot Gold Cup (G1)	L Piggott	9-0	Gd-Firm	7/4	6	1st	7 lengths
02 Aug 79	Goodwood	2m 5f	Goodwood Cup (G2)	J Mercer	9-2	Good	4/9f	5	1st	7 lengths
13 Sep 79	Doncaster	2 1/4 miles	Doncaster Cup (G3)	J Mercer	9-2	Gd-Firm	4/11f	5	1st	3/4 length
06 Oct 79	Newmarket	2 miles	Jockey Club Cup (G3)	J Mercer	9-0	Firm	5/4f	8	5th	3 3/4 lengths
19 Jun 80	Royal Ascot	2 1/2 miles	Ascot Gold Cup (G1)	J Mercer	9-0	Good	3/1f	8	1st	3/4 length
31 Jul 80	Goodwood	2m 5f	Goodwood Cup (G2)	J Mercer	9-2	Good	4/7f	5	1st	Neck
11 Sep 80	Doncaster	2 1/4 miles	Doncaster Cup (G3)	J Mercer	9-2	Good	4/6f	5	1st	Neck
28 Sep 80	Longchamp	2 1/2 miles	Prix Gladiateur (G3)	J Mercer	9-4	Good	4/5f	7	2nd	1/2 length

== Assessment ==
In 1980 he was officially Europe's second best older horse, and the fourth best overall with a rating of 129, placing him behind the three-year-olds Moorestyle and Argument as well as the four-year-old Ela-Mana-Mou. Following a "recalibration" of historic ratings in 2013, the ratings of all horses in the 1980 classification were moved down by four pounds, giving him a new official rating of 125.

The independent Timeform awarded Le Moss a peak rating of 135 in 1980, making him their highest-rated older horse and the second best horse of any age behind Moorestyle. They described him in their annual as "a powerful, relentless galloper......a phenomenon among racehorses: he's not the best long-distance horse we've ever seen, but if there is such a thing as a top-class racehorse that stays forever, Le Moss is probably the closest to him we have encountered since that great out-and-out stayer of the mid-forties Marsyas II, and on the score of determination and courage, precious few stayers of the post-war era rank with Le Moss......His performance in winning his second Gold Cup was one of the most stirring seen on a racecourse in many a year; it was an unforgettable display of endurance and courage......When he took the so-called stayers triple crown as a four-year-old he became the first horse to do so for over twenty-five years, and no other horse has completed that notable treble two years in a row. And he achieved his second treble the hard way, making virtually every yard of the running in almost seven and a half miles of competition......In terms of merit, we rate Le Moss (135) higher than his famous brother Levmoss (133)."

In their book A Century of Champions, based on a modified version of the Timeform system, John Randall and Tony Morris awarded Le Moss a mark of 133, which put him equal-95th in their list of the top 200 British and Irish-trained Flat horses of the 20th century, rating him superior to nine Epsom Derby winners, including Golden Fleece (132), Royal Palace (131) and St Paddy (132), multiple classic winners Assert (132) and Balanchine (132), triple crown winners Diamond Jubilee (132) and Rock Sand (131) as well as Prix de l'Arc de Triomphe winner Carroll House (131).

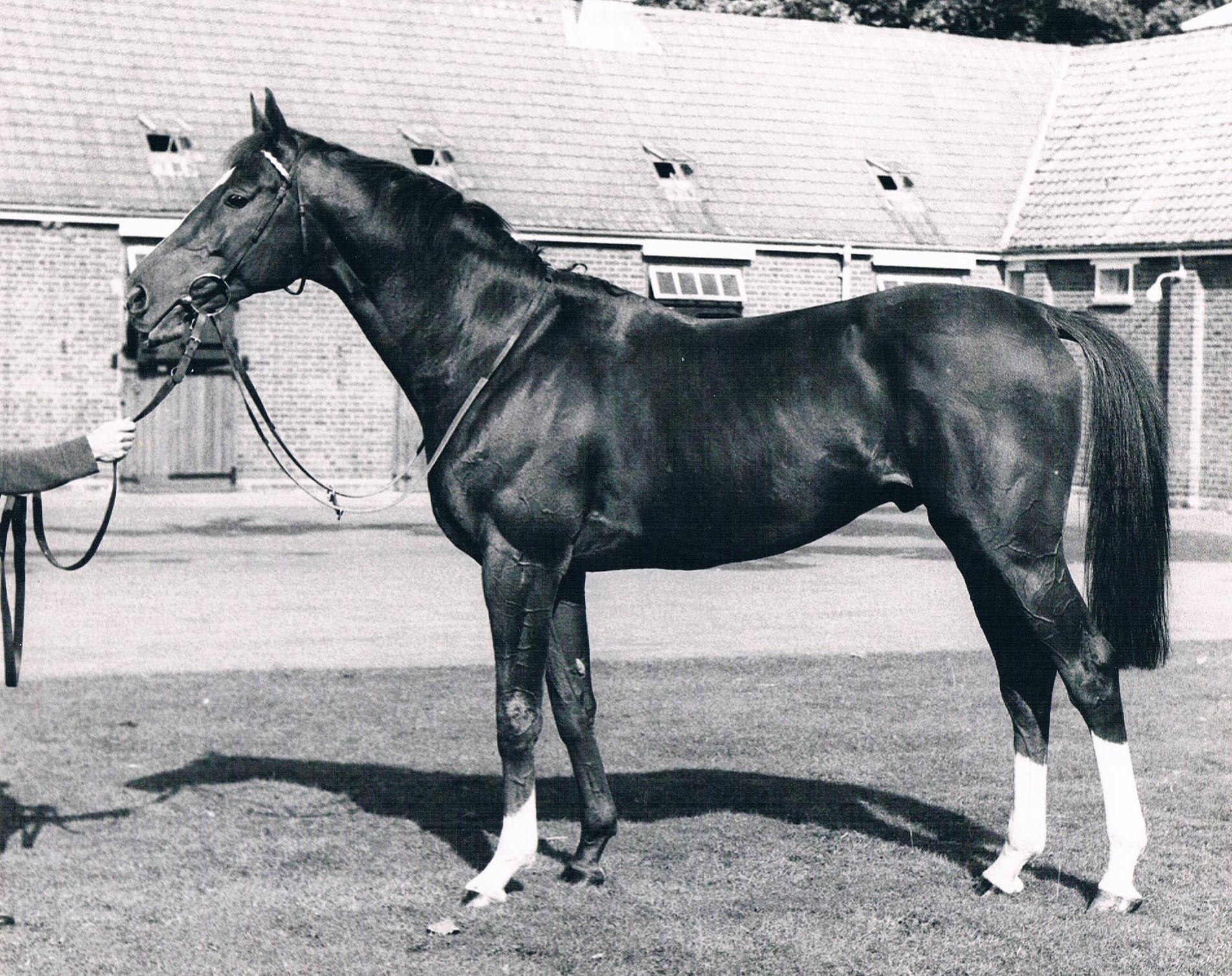
Le Moss in 1980

== Stud record ==
Le Moss was retired to Brownstown Stud in Ireland. Although he had raced throughout 1980 in the colours of Carlo d'Alessio, he was bought after the Ascot Gold Cup by Paddy McGrath (a trustee of the McGrath Trust Company, his breeders) for a reported £250,000 and leased back to d'Alessio for the remainder of his racing career before taking up stallion duties in 1981 at Brownstown Stud, the place of his birth.

He made no impact as a sire of flat runners, but his progeny had some success in National Hunt racing. The best of his offspring was the steeplechaser Scotton Banks, who won the Peter Marsh Chase and the Martell Cup in 1996. He was also the damsire of the Cheltenham Gold Cup winner Imperial Commander. Le Moss died at the age of twenty-five at Waterhouse Farm near Minehead in Somerset on 17 August 2000. On learning of his passing, Joe Mercer, who rode him to 8 of his 11 victories, said: "Le Moss was difficult to train and would never go on the gallops unless he felt like it. But he always woke up once we got him to a racecourse. He was as tough as old boots and tremendously difficult to pass. So my orders were invariably to lead from the start and just keep punching all the way to the line. That was the way I rode him in those great Cup races in 1980 and I shall always remember the old rascal with great affection. He was an outstanding stayer."

== Pedigree ==
Pedigree of Le Moss (GB), chestnut stallion 1975
Sire Le Levanstell	Le Lavandou	Djebel	Tourbillon
Sire Le Levanstell	Le Lavandou	Djebel	Loika
Sire Le Levanstell	Le Lavandou	Lavande	Rustom Pasha
Sire Le Levanstell	Le Lavandou	Lavande	Livadia
Sire Le Levanstell	Stella's Sister	Ballyogan	Fair Trial
Sire Le Levanstell	Stella's Sister	Ballyogan	Serial
Sire Le Levanstell	Stella's Sister	My Aid	Knight of the Garter
Sire Le Levanstell	Stella's Sister	My Aid	Flying Aid
Dam Feemoss	Ballymoss	Mossborough	Nearco
Dam Feemoss	Ballymoss	Mossborough	All Moonshine
Dam Feemoss	Ballymoss	Indian Call	Singapore
Dam Feemoss	Ballymoss	Indian Call	Flittemere
Dam Feemoss	Feevagh	Solar Slipper	Windsor Slipper
Dam Feemoss	Feevagh	Solar Slipper	Solar Flower
Dam Feemoss	Feevagh	Astrid Wood	Bois Roussel
Dam Feemoss	Feevagh	Astrid Wood	Astrid (Family: 1-k)
