= Jason Weaver (jockey) =

Retired British Flat jockey

Jason Charles Weaver (born 9 February 1972) is a former, classic-winning, British flat racing jockey who had his major successes in the mid-1990s. In total, Weaver rode more than 1,000 winners in a career which spanned fourteen years. Since retiring he has worked as a presenter and pundit, and currently works on ITV Racing and Sky Sports Racing. Weaver is one of only seven jockeys to have ridden two hundred winners in a season, a feat achieved in 1994 when he finished runner-up to Frankie Dettori in the jockeys' championship.

== Biography ==
Weaver was born in Nottingham on 9 February 1972: he was, however, brought up in Portskewett, South Wales after his family moved there when he was six months old. His father Eric Weaver was a professional footballer who played for a number of clubs, including Notts County and Swindon Town. In 1989, Weaver was apprenticed to Luca Cumani at Newmarket and rode his first winner, True Dividend, at Brighton on 30 May 1990. In 1993 he was champion apprentice with sixty winners

In 1994, Weaver rode 200 winners and finished runner-up to Frankie Dettori in the British flat racing Champion Jockey championship. He is one of just seven jockeys that have achieved this success. His successes included partnering Mister Baileys, trained by Mark Johnson to the 2000 Guineas at Newmarket. He became Johnson's stable jockey at Middleham. Weaver also won the 1995 Ascot Gold Cup on Double Trigger and the 1995 Prix de l'Abbaye de Longchamp on Hever Golf Rose. A year later, at Royal Ascot, Weaver won the St. James's Palace Stakes with the Mark Johnston-trained Bijou d'Inde.

In 2002, Weaver announced his retirement as a jockey at the age of 30, citing problems with keeping his weight down as the major issue. However, he was keen to stay in the sport, seeing his retirement as a jockey as a way forward in other management and training areas of the sport. He works as a pundit for ITV Racing and as a presenter for the horse racing channel Sky Sports Racing.

In 2006, he announced his comeback, despite a significant weight gain. It would be only for a single race, though. The match was the Ladbrokes Shergar Cup Duel, an annual prelude to the Shergar Cup at Ascot between two of the world's premier jockeys. The 2006 contest was between Weaver, who represented the Great Britain and Ireland team, and Michael Roberts, who served as the Rest of the World team manager. Riding Pic Up Sticks, the win was secured by Weaver, who said afterwards, "Ascot was a lucky track for me when I was riding so it is great to have ridden a winner on the new course."
