= Lassalle (horse) =

French-bred Thoroughbred racehorse

- Sire: Bon Mot
- Grandsire: Worden
- Dam: Windy Cliff
- Damsire: Hard Sauce
- Sex: Stallion
- Foaled: 28 February 1969
- Country: France
- Colour: Bay
- Breeder: Louis Champion
- Owner: Zenya Yoshida
- Trainer: Richard Carver, Jr
- Record: 22: 6-2-6

Major wins
- Prix de l'Esperance (1972); Prix Berteux (1972); Prix du Cadran (1973); Ascot Gold Cup (1973); Prix Gladiateur (1973)

Awards
- Timeform rating 120 (1972), 125 (1973), 125 (1974)

Lassalle (28 February 1969 – after 1981) was a French Thoroughbred racehorse and sire. He was a specialist stayer who recorded all of his major wins over distances of 3000 m or longer. He showed promise as a two-year-old when he won one minor race and was placed in both the Prix de Condé and the Critérium de Saint-Cloud. In the following year, he developed into a high-class stayer, recording Group Three wins in the Prix de l'Esperance and Prix Berteux, as well as being placed in the Prix Greffulhe, Prix Hocquart, and Prix Royal-Oak. He reached his peak as a four-year-old in 1973, when he completed a rare double by winning both the Prix du Cadran and the Ascot Gold Cup before ending his season with a win in the Prix Gladiateur. He retained most of his ability as a five-year-old, when he was narrowly beaten in the Prix du Cadran and ran third in the Ascot Gold Cup. After his retirement from racing, he was exported to stand at stud in Japan, but had little success as a breeding stallion.

== Background ==
Lassalle was a "strong, powerful" bay horse with a narrow white stripe bred in France by Louis Champion. As a yearling, he was sent to the sales at Deauville and was bought for £23,000 by representatives of Zenya Yoshida, the Japanese founder of Shadai Farm. The colt was sent into training in France with Richard Carver Jr.

Lassalle was from the first crop of foals sired by Bon Mot, the winner of the 1966 Prix de l'Arc de Triomphe. His dam Windy Cliff showed high-class form on the track, finishing second in the Prix Cléopâtre and became a successful broodmare whose other offspring included the steeplechaser Ravageur (Prix La Haye Jousselin). She was a granddaughter of Feola, a British broodmare foaled in 1926, who has been the female-line ancestor of numerous major winners including Pebbles, Deep Impact, Aureole, Nashwan, Jet Ski Lady, and Johannesburg.

== Racing career ==
=== 1971: Two-year-old season ===
After winning a race over 1200 m on his racecourse debut, Lassalle was moved up in class and distance for the Prix de Condé at Longchamp Racecourse in October and finished third behind Relpin and Gay Saint. On his final run of the year, he contested the Critérium de Saint-Cloud and came home third behind Gay Saint and Pardner.

=== 1972: Three-year-old season ===
Lassalle began his second campaign by contesting some of the major trial races for the French Classic Races. In April, he finished third to Sancy in the Prix Greffulhe over 2100 m at Longchamp and fifth behind the same colt in the Prix Noailles over 2300 m at the same course. On 7 May, he started a 14/1 outsider for the 2400 metre Prix Hocquart and finished third behind Talleyrand and Exalte with Gay Saint in fourth. Rather than being aimed at the Prix du Jockey Club, Lassalle was stepped up in distance for the Prix de l'Esperance (the race now known as the Prix Chaudenay) over 3000 m at Longchamp and recorded his first major success as Jean-Claude Desaint rode him to victory in the Group Three event from Apollo Eight and Aristophane. At Chantilly Racecourse in June, he added another Group Three success over the same distance as he defeated Nubayr and Folkestone in the Prix Berteux. His form in staying races had him start second favourite for the Group One Grand Prix de Paris over 3100 m on 25 June, but he ran poorly and finished unplaced behind Pleben.

After a lengthy break, Lassalle returned to the track in September for the Prix Royal-Oak over the Grand Prix de Paris course and distance. Ridden by Lester Piggott, he again found Pleben too good, but produced a much better effort, as he finished third, beaten three lengths by the winner. On his final appearance of the year, the colt was brought back in distance and matched against older horses in the Prix du Conseil Municipal over 2400 m at Longchamp in October, but made no impact and finished unplaced behind the six-year-old Monsieur D.

=== 1973: Four-year-old season ===
On his first run as a four-year-old, Lassalle ran in the Prix de Barbeville over 3100 m and Longchamp and finished sixth behind Filandre. In the Prix Jean Prat over the same course and distance later that month, he started second favourite and looked the likely winner early in the straight before being overtaken in the closing and beaten easily by the British-trained five-year-old Parnell with Filandre and Pleben in third and fourth. After finishing fifth in his next start over 2400 m, the colt was moved up in distance for France's most prestigious long-distance race, the 4000-m Prix du Cadran at Longchamp on 20 May. Ridden by the British jockey Jimmy Lindley, he started the 2.7/1 second favourite in a six-runner field. In a slowly run race, Pleben was forced to make the running and refused to co-operate with his jockey, attempting to pull himself up and then bolting as the horses approached the final turn. Having been settled in second place by Lindley, Lassalle moved up to overtake the favourite early in the straight and drew away to win "comfortably" by three lengths.

Lindley was again in the saddle when Lassalle was sent to England in June to contest the Gold Cup over two and a half miles on soft ground at Royal Ascot and started the 2/1 favourite. His six opponents included the dual Irish classic winner Pidget, Celtic Cone (Yorkshire Cup) and The Admiral (Henry II Stakes). The pacemaker Atout (ridden by Piggott) led the field into the straight before giving way to Celtic Cone. Lassalle, however, moved up to join Celtic Cove before drawing away to win by five lengths, with a gap of four lengths back to The Admiral in third. He became only the fourth horse to win the Prix du Cadran and the Gold Cup after Boiard (1874), Arbar (1948), and Levmoss (1969). Although Timeform acknowledged that the French colt had won in "grand style", they described the field as one of the poorest ever assembled for Britain's premier staying event.

After an absence of well over 3 months, Lassalle ran in the 1973 Prix de l'Arc de Triomphe at Longchamp on 7 October. Racing over an inadequate distance of 2400 m, he started a 99/1 outsider, but ran well to finish ninth of the 27 runners behind Rheingold. Three weeks after his run in the Arc, Lassalle returned to Longchamp for Europe's longest major flat race, the 4800-m (3-mi) Prix Gladiateur. He was made the 1.7/1 favourite ahead of Parnell, with the best of the other five runners appearing to be the six-year-old gelding Forceful. After moving up to challenge for the lead early in the straight, he finished second, beaten a "short neck" by Parnell with a gap of four lengths back to Forceful in third place. Parnell, however, had hung to the left in the straight, hampering both of his main rivals and the racecourse stewards relegated the British challenger to third, awarding the race to Lassalle. Timeform commented that the reports of the race expressed little surprise at the stewards' decision.

=== 1974: Five-year-old season ===
Lassalle remained in training as five-year-old, and showed good form despite failing to win in four races. He looked less than fully fit on his seasonal debut in April and finished fourth behind the four-year-old Recupere, Parnell, and Filandre in the Prix Barbeville. In his attempt to repeat his 1973 success in the Prix du Cadran on 26 May, he started second favourite behind Recupere in a field which also included Parnell, Filandre, and Proverb (Goodwood Cup, Doncaster Cup). Ridden by Piggott, he took the lead 400 m from the finish and looked certain to win, but was overtaken in the final strides and beaten by a head by Recupere.

The 1974 Ascot Gold Cup was run on much firmer ground than the previous year's edition, and the very slow pace did not suit Lassalle. He nevertheless looked to have a very good chance when taking a clear lead in the straight, but was soon joined by the British-trained Ragstone. In a close contest over the final furlong, he finished third behind Ragstone and the late-running Proverb. In the Prix Kergorlay at Deauville Racecourse in August, he appeared to be outpaced in the straight and finished fifth behind Ribecourt.

== Assessment and awards ==
No International Classification of European two-year-olds was held in 1971; the official handicappers of Britain, Ireland and France compiled separate rankings for horses which competed in those countries. In the official French Handicap, Lassalle was rated 12 lb inferior to the best juvenile of the season. In the following year, the independent Timeform organisation gave him a rating of 120, making him 14 lb inferior to their top-rated three-year-olds Deep Diver and Sallust. In the following year, Timeform gave him a rating of 125, 5 lb behind Parnell, who was named the best stayer of the season. Lassalle was again rated 125 by Timeform in 1974, 2 lb below Recupere and 3 lb below Ragstone, who was their best stayer. In their annual Racehorses of 1974, they described him as a "good-class, genuine and consistent stayer", but "lacking in finishing pace".

In their book A Century of Champions, based on a modified version of the Timeform system, John Randall and Tony Morris rated Lassalle as an "inferior" winner of the Gold Cup.

== Stud record ==
At the end of his racing career, Lassalle was exported to stand at his owner's stud in Japan. He appears to have had problems with low fertility, with only 81 registered foals from 204 coverings in six seasons at stud. He sired the winners of 132 races, but none of these was at Graded level. In 1981, his last season at stud, Lassalle covered only two mares, neither of which produced a foal.

== Pedigree ==
Pedigree of Lassalle (USA), bay stallion, 1969
Sire Bon Mot (FR) 1963	Worden (FR); 1949	Wild Risk	Rialto
Sire Bon Mot (FR) 1963	Worden (FR); 1949	Wild Risk	Wild Violet
Sire Bon Mot (FR) 1963	Worden (FR); 1949	Sans Tares	Sind
Sire Bon Mot (FR) 1963	Worden (FR); 1949	Sans Tares	Tara
Sire Bon Mot (FR) 1963	Djebel Idra (FR); 1957	Phil Drake	Admiral Drake
Sire Bon Mot (FR) 1963	Djebel Idra (FR); 1957	Phil Drake	Philippa
Sire Bon Mot (FR) 1963	Djebel Idra (FR); 1957	Djebellica	Djebel
Sire Bon Mot (FR) 1963	Djebel Idra (FR); 1957	Djebellica	Nica
Dam Windy Cliff (FR) 1955	Hard Sauce (GB); 1948	Ardan	Pharis
Dam Windy Cliff (FR) 1955	Hard Sauce (GB); 1948	Ardan	Adargatis
Dam Windy Cliff (FR) 1955	Hard Sauce (GB); 1948	Saucy Bella	Bellacose
Dam Windy Cliff (FR) 1955	Hard Sauce (GB); 1948	Saucy Bella	Marmite
Dam Windy Cliff (FR) 1955	Foretaste (GB); 1938	Umidwar	Blandford
Dam Windy Cliff (FR) 1955	Foretaste (GB); 1938	Umidwar	Uganda
Dam Windy Cliff (FR) 1955	Foretaste (GB); 1938	Feola	Friar Marcus
Dam Windy Cliff (FR) 1955	Foretaste (GB); 1938	Feola	Aloe (Family: 2-f)
