= Cartier Champion Stayer =

Award in European horse racing

The Cartier Champion Stayer is an award in European horse racing, founded in 1991, and sponsored by Cartier SA as part of the Cartier Racing Awards. The award winner is decided by points earned in group races plus the votes cast by British racing journalists and readers of the Racing Post and The Daily Telegraph newspapers.

== Records ==
Most successful horse (4 wins):

- Yeats – 2006, 2007, 2008, 2009

Leading trainer (9 wins):

- Aidan O'Brien – Yeats (2006, 2007, 2008, 2009), Fame and Glory (2011), Leading Light (2014), Order of St George (2016, 2017), Kyprios (2022)

Leading owner (9 wins):

- Sue Magnier – Yeats (2006, 2007, 2008, 2009), Fame and Glory (2011), Leading Light (2014), Order of St George (2016, 2017), Kyprios (2022)

=== Winners ===
Year	Horse	Age	Gender	Bred	Trained	Trainer	Owner
1991	Turgeon	5	H	USA	FR	Jonathan Pease	George W. Strawbridge Jr.
1992	Drum Taps	6	H	USA	GB	Lord Huntingdon	Yoshio Asakawa
1993	Vintage Crop	6	G	GB	IRE	Dermot Weld	Michael Smurfit
1994	Moonax	3	C	IRE	GB	Barry Hills	Sheikh Mohammed
1995	Double Trigger	4	C	IRE	GB	Mark Johnston	R W Huggins
1996	Nononito	5	H	USA	FR	Patrick Sebagh	Jean Lesbordes
1997	Celeric	5	G	GB	GB	John Dunlop	Christopher Spence
1998	Kayf Tara	4	C	GB	GB	Saeed bin Suroor	Godolphin
1999	Kayf Tara	5	H	GB	GB	Saeed bin Suroor	Godolphin
2000	Kayf Tara	5	H	GB	GB	Saeed bin Suroor	Godolphin
2001	Persian Punch	8	G	IRE	GB	David Elsworth	Jeff Smith
2002	Vinnie Roe	4	C	IRE	IRE	Dermot Weld	Jim Sheridan
2003	Persian Punch	10	G	IRE	GB	David Elsworth	Jeff Smith
2004	Westerner	5	H	GB	FR	Élie Lellouche	Ecurie Wildenstein
2005	Westerner	6	H	GB	FR	Élie Lellouche	Ecurie Wildenstein
2006	Yeats	5	H	IRE	IRE	Aidan O'Brien	Sue Magnier & Diane Nagle
2007	Yeats	6	H	IRE	IRE	Aidan O'Brien	Sue Magnier & Diane Nagle
2008	Yeats	7	H	IRE	IRE	Aidan O'Brien	Sue Magnier & Diane Nagle
2009	Yeats	8	H	IRE	IRE	Aidan O'Brien	Sue Magnier & Diane Nagle
2010	Rite Of Passage	6	G	GB	IRE	Dermot Weld	Ronan Lamb
2011	Fame and Glory	5	H	IRE	IRE	Aidan O'Brien	Smith, Magnier & Tabor
2012	Colour Vision	4	G	FR	GB	Saeed bin Suroor	Godolphin
2013	Estimate	4	F	IRE	GB	Sir Michael Stoute	Queen Elizabeth II
2014	Leading Light	4	C	IRE	IRE	Aidan O'Brien	Smith, Magnier & Tabor
2015	Simple Verse	3	F	IRE	GB	Ralph Beckett	QBL, Sheikh Suhaim Al Thani, M Al Kubaisi
2016	Order of St George	4	C	IRE	IRE	Aidan O'Brien	Magnier, Smith and Tabor
2017	Order of St George	5	H	IRE	IRE	Aidan O'Brien	Magnier, Smith and Tabor
2018	Stradivarius	4	C	IRE	GB	John Gosden	Bjorn Nielsen
2019	Stradivarius	5	H	IRE	GB	John Gosden	Bjorn Nielsen
2020	Stradivarius	6	H	IRE	GB	John Gosden	Bjorn Nielsen
2021	Trueshan	5	G	FR	GB	Alan King	Singula Partnership
2022	Kyprios	4	C	FR	GB	Aidan O'Brien	Magnier, Smith and Tabor
2023	Trueshan	7	G	FR	GB	Alan King	Singula Partnership
2024	Kyprios	6	H	IRE	IRE	Aidan O'Brien	Magnier, Smith and Tabor
2025	Trawlerman	7	G	IRE	IRE	John & Thady Gosden	Godolphin
2026	Scandinavia	4	C	USA	IRE	Aidan O'Brien	Magnier, Smith and Tabor
