= Prix Berteux =

- Class: Group 3
- Location: Various, France
- Final run: 13 July 2003
- Race type: Flat / Thoroughbred

Race information
- Distance: 3,000 metres (1 7/8 miles)
- Surface: Turf
- Qualification: Three-year-olds
- Weight: 56 kg Allowances; 1 1/2 kg for fillies Penalties; 2 kg for Group winners * * since January 1
- Purse: €66,000 (2003); 1st: €33,000

The Prix Berteux was a Group 3 flat horse race in France open to three-year-old thoroughbreds. It was run at various tracks over a distance of 3,000 metres (about 1 7/8 miles), and it was scheduled to take place each year in June or July.

== History ==
During the 19th century, the event was staged at Longchamp as the Prix de la Néva. It usually took place on the day before the Grand Prix de Paris. For a period it was contested over 2,900 metres, and it was extended to 3,000 metres in 1889.

The race continued as the Prix de la Néva until 1913. It was renamed in honour of Count de Berteux, a successful racehorse owner, in 1914.

The Prix Berteux was held at Maisons-Laffitte in 1943, and Auteuil in 1944. It was subsequently transferred to Chantilly. The present system of race grading was introduced in 1971, and the event was given Group 3 status.

The venue of the Prix Berteux changed frequently in the 1990s. It had brief spells at Longchamp (1991–92), Maisons-Laffitte (1993–94, 3,100 metres) and Deauville (1995). It was held at Maisons-Laffitte again in 1996, and returned to Chantilly in 1997.

The event was switched to Vichy in 2001, and to Deauville in 2003. It was discontinued in 2004.

== Records ==
Leading jockey since 1979 (4 wins):

- Gérald Mossé – Bayrika (1994), Pozarica (1998), Roman Saddle (2001), Mr Dinos (2002)

Leading trainer since 1979 (7 wins):

- André Fabre – Top Sunrise (1988), Sharnfold (1989), Ecologist (1991), Raintrap (1993), Affidavit (1995), New Frontier (1997), Artistique (1999)

Leading owner since 1979 (3 wins):

- Khalid Abdullah – Sharnfold (1989), Ecologist (1991), Raintrap (1993)

== Winners since 1979 ==
Year	Winner	Jockey	Trainer	Owner	Time
1979	Prove It Baby	Philippe Paquet	François Boutin	Walter Haefner
1980	Dhaubix	Freddy Head	Robert Corme	Daniel Courtois
1981	Le Mamamouchi	Henri Samani	Georges Bridgland	Jean de Souza-Lage	3:11.40
1982	Petit Montmorency	Maurice Philipperon	John Fellows	Robin Scully	3:37.20
1983	Brogan	Yves Saint-Martin	Ian Balding	James Moseley	3:09.60
1984	Mont Basile	Alain Badel	Gérard Collet	Ecurie Formule 1	3:16.40
1985	Khaelan	John Lowe	Steve Norton	Ahmed bin Salman
1986	Satco	Freddy Head	Pascal Bary	Jean-Louis Bouchard
1987	Tabayaan	Yves Saint-Martin	Alain de Royer-Dupré	HH Aga Khan IV	3:16.70
1988	Top Sunrise	Cash Asmussen	André Fabre	Charles Schmidt	3:20.20
1989	Sharnfold	Pat Eddery	André Fabre	Khalid Abdullah	3:16.90
1990	Nil Bleu	Dominique Boeuf	Jean-Paul Gallorini	Sylvia Wildenstein	3:11.20
1991	Ecologist	Pat Eddery	André Fabre	Khalid Abdullah	3:17.80
1992	Djais	Corey Black	Jonathan Pease	Adrian Chalk	3:22.00
1993	Raintrap	Pat Eddery	André Fabre	Khalid Abdullah	3:21.50
1994	Bayrika	Gérald Mossé	Alain de Royer-Dupré	HH Aga Khan IV	3:20.00
1995	Affidavit	Thierry Jarnet	André Fabre	Sheikh Mohammed	3:15.80
1996	Eurynome	Thierry Jarnet	Pascal Bary	Egon Wanke	3:18.90
1997	New Frontier	Thierry Jarnet	André Fabre	Michael Tabor	3:16.50
1998	Pozarica	Gérald Mossé	Nicolas Clément	Maktoum Al Maktoum	3:12.60
1999	Artistique	Olivier Peslier	André Fabre	Jean-Luc Lagardère	3:11.20
2000	Samsaam	Willie Supple	John Dunlop	Hamdan Al Maktoum	3:15.40
2001	Roman Saddle	Gérald Mossé	Carlos Laffon-Parias	Wertheimer et Frère	3:15.50
2002	Mr Dinos	Gérald Mossé	Paul Cole	Constantine Shiacolas	3:15.60
2003	Risk Seeker	Dominique Boeuf	Élie Lellouche	Ecurie Wildenstein	3:09.80

== Earlier winners ==
- 1869: Trompette
- 1870: Don Carlos
- 1871: no race
- 1872: Condor *
- 1873: Torrent
- 1874: Figaro
- 1875: Galba
- 1876: Soumarin
- 1877: Ravisseur
- 1878: Boulouf
- 1879: Courtois
- 1880: Orpheon
- 1881: Gerald
- 1882: Quolibet
- 1883: Florestan
- 1884: Beauregard
- 1885: Lavandiere
- 1886: Fils d'Artois
- 1887: Cambyse
- 1888: Max
- 1889: Vasistas
- 1890: Liliane
- 1891: Courant d'Air
- 1892: Arrosage
- 1893: Cadet Roussel
- 1894: Algarade
- 1895: Marseillan
- 1896: Panpan
- 1897: Inflexible
- 1898: Fenouil
- 1899: Irkoutsk
- 1900: Annecy
- 1901: Ali
- 1902: Surprenant
- 1903: Lavandier
- 1904: Georgien
- 1905: Avanti
- 1906: Caramel
- 1907: Roi Herode
- 1908: Montavalle
- 1909: Chandos
- 1910: Sursis
- 1911: Pire
- 1912: Take Are
- 1913: Pendragon
- 1914: Djamy
- 1919: Juveigneur
- 1920: Embry
- 1921: Le Prodige
- 1922: Almaviva
- 1923: Mousko
- 1924: Dauphin
- 1925: Chubasco
- 1926: Sapajou
- 1927: Montemafroy
- 1928: Cri de Guerre
- 1929: Innoxa
- 1930: Tiresias
- 1931: Prytanee
- 1932: Henin
- 1933: Assuerus
- 1934: Silver Bow
- 1935: Votre Altesse
- 1936: Carius
- 1937: Chinchilla
- 1938: Vaisseau Fantome
- 1939: Le Souriceau
- 1941: Nabah
- 1942: Grand Kid
- 1943: Marsyas
- 1944: Derio
- 1951: Pharas
- 1953: Fontenoy
- 1959: Seddouk
- 1961: Granadero
- 1962: Celadon
- 1963: Azincourt
- 1964: White Label
- 1965: Pompon Rouge
- 1967: Misyaaf
- 1969: Chaparral
- 1970: Colbert
- 1971: Rakosi
- 1972: Lassalle
- 1973: Recupere
- 1974: Le Bavard
- 1975: no race
- 1976: Campero
- 1977: Yelpana
- 1978: Act One

* The 1872 race finished as a dead-heat between Condor and Tabac, but it was decided by a run-off.

== See also ==
- List of French flat horse races
