= Jocelyn Wildenstein =

Swiss socialite (1940–2024)

- Born: Jocelyne Alice Périsset; 7 September 1940; Lausanne, Vaud, Switzerland
- Died: 31 December 2024 (aged 84); Paris, France
- Known for: Extensive facial surgeries
- Spouse: Alec N. Wildenstein (m. 1978; div. 1999)
- Partner: Lloyd Klein (2003–2024; her death)
- Children: 2

Jocelyne Alice Wildenstein (Note: On whether to use a second "e" at the end of her forename, Wildenstein once told The Times, "People in Europe want to put the 'e' and in America, they don't put the 'e' – it came on and off, this 'e'".) (née Périsset; (7 September 1940 (Note: Wildenstein was reported to have been born in 1940, but other sources reported she was born in 1945, with the Australian Broadcasting Corporation noting the discrepancy.) – 31 December 2024) was a Swiss socialite known for her extensive cosmetic surgery, which created a cat-like facial appearance; her 1999 high-profile divorce from billionaire art dealer and businessman Alec Wildenstein; and her extravagant lifestyle and subsequent bankruptcy filing.

== Early life and relationships ==
Wildenstein was born as Jocelyne Alice Périsset in Lausanne, Switzerland. Her father, Armand Périsset, worked in a sporting goods store and her mother Liliane Périsset was a housewife. She began dating Swiss Cyril Piguet, producer of the 1964 film Un commerce tranquille, at the age of 17. She later lived in Paris with Italian French filmmaker Sergio Gobbi. While there, she became a skilled hunter and pilot.

Périsset was introduced to Alec N. Wildenstein, of the family of wealthy art dealers, by Saudi arms dealer Adnan Khashoggi at a shooting weekend at the Wildenstein ranch "Ol Jogi" in Kenya in 1977. Périsset and Wildenstein eloped to Las Vegas on 30 April 1978. They had two children together.

The Wildensteins' divorce in 1999 was not amicable. Jocelyn walked in on her husband and a 21-year-old Russian model in her bedroom at the couple's New York City home, and he threatened Jocelyn with a gun. This resulted in a night in jail for Alec Wildenstein. The presiding judge, Marilyn Diamond, received death threats in the mail during the proceedings. During her divorce, the judge stipulated that she could not use any alimony payments for further cosmetic surgery. Jocelyn enlisted the services of Ed Rollins for public-relations assistance and at various times both Bernard Clair and Kenneth Godt for legal counsel. Wildenstein began dating fashion designer Lloyd Klein in 2003.

== Cosmetic surgery ==
Wildenstein had extensive cosmetic surgeries to her face. Her cat-like appearance led media outlets to nickname her "Catwoman", "The Lion Queen", and "The Bride of Wildenstein". She denied having excessive plastic surgery, citing her Swiss heritage, but admitted to a multimillion-dollar surgery to make her eyes more cat-like, which she did with her husband. According to Alec Wildenstein, "She was thinking that she could fix her face like a piece of furniture. Skin does not work that way, but she wouldn't listen".

== Finances ==
Wildenstein was known for having lived her life in an extravagant manner. She once calculated her yearly telephone bill at $60,000 and food and wine costs at $547,000. Wildenstein received $2.5 billion in her divorce settlement (although this amount has been rumored to be as high as $3.8 billion) and $100 million each year for the following 13 years. The judge stipulated that she could not use any alimony payments for further cosmetic surgery. Following her divorce, Wildenstein sold the marital home in New York City to real estate developer Janna Bullock for $13 million.

Wildenstein filed for Chapter 11 bankruptcy protection in 2018, claiming she had $0 in her bank account and listing various tangible assets of $16.39 million against $6.38 million in liabilities. Her three apartments in Trump Tower were repossessed in 2020. Wildenstein told The Times in 2023 that she attributed her financial difficulties to problems with the trust set up following her divorce, and that the family of Alec Wildenstein had cut her off from payments in 2015.

== Death ==
Jocelyn Wildenstein died from a pulmonary embolism at a hotel in Paris on 31 December 2024.
