= Colour Vision =

Colour Vision may refer to:

- Colour Vision (horse), a Thoroughbred racehorse
- Colour Vision (album), a 2020 album by MAX
- Color vision, the ability to distinguish colours
