= Moonax =

Irish-bred Thoroughbred racehorse

- Racing colours of Sheikh Mohammed
- Sire: Caerleon
- Grandsire: Nijinsky
- Dam: Moonsilk
- Damsire: Solinus
- Sex: Stallion
- Foaled: 22 March 1991
- Country: Ireland
- Colour: Chestnut
- Breeder: Liscannor Stud
- Owner: Sheikh Mohammed
- Trainer: Barry Hills
- Record: 22: 6-7-4
- Earnings: £ 427,601

Major wins
- St Leger (1994); Prix Royal-Oak (1994); Yorkshire Cup (1995)

Awards
- European Champion Stayer (1994)
- Last updated on August 25, 2007

Moonax (1991–2004) was an Irish-bred, English-trained Thoroughbred racehorse and sire. In 1994 Moonax became the first horse to win both the Classic St Leger and the Prix Royal-Oak and was named European Champion Stayer. He remains the only three-year-old to have been honoured in this way. He stayed in training until the age of six, winning only two more races, but finishing second in four Group One races. In his later career he acquired a reputation for unpredictable and sometimes dangerous behaviour and was described as "the world's naughtiest horse". He was most unusual as a Classic winner who was raced over hurdles. He died in 2004 at the age of thirteen.

== Background ==
Moonax, a chestnut horse with a white blaze who stood 16.2 hands high, was bred in Ireland by the Liscannor Stud. His sire, Caerleon, won the Prix du Jockey Club and the Benson & Hedges Gold Cup in 1983 and went on to become an "excellent" stallion, siring the winners of more than 700 races including Generous, Marienbard and Warrsan. His dam, Moonsilk, never won a race, but came from a good family, being a half sister of the 1975 1000 Guineas winner, Nocturnal Spree.

Moonax was sent by the County Limerick-based Newborough Stud as a yearling to the Goffs sales in October 1992, where he was bought for IR£37,000 by the Curragh Bloodstock Agency He entered the ownership of Sheikh Mohammed and was sent into training with Barry Hills at Lambourn. Recalling Monnax's temperament, Hills said "you couldn't let him near another horse. He would have attacked them" whilst one of his jockeys remembered that "he'd pin you up against the wall before you knew it". A sign outside the horse's stable warned visitors not to approach.

== Racing career ==
=== 1993: two-year-old season ===
Moonax's career began in an unusual and unfortunate manner. He was sent off the 6/1 third favourite for a maiden race at Doncaster in November 1993. After running prominently for the first two furlongs he was badly hampered, stumbled and unseated his rider Richard Quinn.

=== 1994: three-year-old season ===
==== Spring ====
Moonax began his three-year-old season by recording his first win in a maiden race at Doncaster in March, taking the lead three furlongs out and running on strongly to win by three lengths. A month later he was sent to Catterick and started 11/8 in a minor stakes race. He led from the start and after being briefly challenged in the straight he pulled clear to record a decisive four length win.

In May, Moonax was stepped up to Group Three class for the Chester Vase, a recognised trial for The Derby. Moonax raced prominently and stayed on well, but had no chance with the impressive winner Broadway Flyer and finished second, beaten five lengths. Plans to run Moonax in the Derby Italiano had to be abandoned when the colt was injured while being loaded onto the plane to Italy.

==== Summer ====
The Chester form was let down when Broadway Flyer finished well down the field in the Derby and Moonax was a 14/1 outsider when he was sent to Royal Ascot for the King Edward VII Stakes. Moonax raced in second before taking the lead in the straight, but faded in the closing stages to finish fifth. His next two races did little to dispel the notion that Moonax was some way below top class. In July he made no show when unplaced in the Deutsches Derby and when dropped down in class for a minor race at Newbury in August he could finish only third after leading briefly in the straight.

==== Autumn ====
Moonax was not considered a serious contender for the St Leger over one and three quarter miles at Doncaster in September, and started the 40/1 outsider of the eight runners. Barry Hills had considered running him instead in a Listed race at the same meeting before deciding that "there are times when you just have to have a go." Ridden for the first time by veteran jockey Pat Eddery he was held up in last place as the pace was set by Broadway Flyer. This was part of a tactical plan by Hills, who felt that the early pace would be very strong, and that Moonax's best opportunity would be to wait for the others to tire before making his challenge. In the straight Moonax began to make steady progress, moving into a clear second place two furlongs out. Moonax caught Broadway Flyer inside the final furlong and stayed on "gamely" to win by one and a half lengths. Moonax became the longest priced winner of the race since 1921. The runner up was trained by John Hills and ridden by Michael Hills, both sons of Moonax's trainer Barry. Barry Hills was reported to be "close to tears" after the race and commented "I am delighted to win. The only disappointment is to have beaten my sons".

It was intended that Moonax would run in the Prix de l'Arc de Triomphe but he was withdrawn from the race to make room in the field for another of Sheikh Mohammed's colts, Richard of York. On his final start of the season therefore, Moonax was moved up further in distance and took on older horses in the Prix Royal-Oak over 3100m at Longchamp in October. Eddery sent the colt to the front 1200m from the finish and maintained the lead into the straight. 300m from the finish he was headed by the gelding Always Earnest but "responded superbly" to regain the lead in the "last strides" to win by a short neck. He was the first, and is still the only St Leger winner to win the French race.

Plans for Moonax to join Sheikh Mohammeds's Godolphin team were modified, and he stayed under Hills' care for the rest of his career. He did, however, spend the winter of 1994–5 in with the Godolphin horses in Dubai, and wonn his first race of 1995 in the Godolphin colours.

=== 1995: four-year-old season ===
Moonax began 1995 with a run in the Yorkshire Cup at York in which he carried five pounds more than his six rivals. He looked "magnificent" before the race and started 11/4 favourite. Moonax tracked the leaders before taking the lead in the straight and ran on strongly to win his third successive race, this time by one and a quarter lengths. Greg Wood writing in The Independent, praised the colt's "authority", "strength" and "enthusiasm" and predicted that he would be hard to beat in the year's top staying events.

The rest of the season saw Moonax running well, but failing to win as he finished second in three Group One races. The first of these was the Gold Cup at Royal Ascot in June. He started 13/8 favourite, but although he stayed on in the straight he could never reach the lead and was beaten five lengths by Double Trigger. Moonax was off the course for three months before running in the Irish St. Leger at The Curragh. He raced prominently, and had every chance in the straight but was beaten a head by Strategic Choice. He then attempted to win a second French Group One in the Prix du Cadran at Longchamp and as in the previous year's Prix Royal-Oak he disputed the finish with Always Earnest. On this occasion however, it was the French-trained gelding who prevailed by a short head. The race also helped to give Moonax a reputation for unpredictable behaviour: he turned his head and attempted to bite Always Earnest in the closing stages.

=== 1996: five-year-old season ===
Moonax began 1996 by finishing third when starting 7/4 favourite for the John Porter Stakes at Newbury in April. He was then off the course for five months before returning for an Autumn campaign. He reappeared in a minor stakes race at Haydock in late September and recorded his first win for well over a year when defeating the Gran Premio del Jockey Club winner Court of Honour by a length.

Before the Prix du Cadran at Longchamp in October Moonax behaved poorly, bucking violently and almost unseating his rider Frankie Dettori. In the race he tracked the leaders before challenging them in the straight. 200m from the finish he lost his chance of winning when he swerved to the left without warning and was beaten a length by Nononito. The explanation offered was that he was attempting to run for the exit leading to the stables. A second attempt at the Prix Royal-Oak ended in disappointment: he led for most of the race and defeated both Nononito and Always Earnest but was caught in the closing stages and beaten half a length by the mare Red Roses Story. The slow pace of the race and the resulting sprint finish were given as reasons for his defeat.

Instead of ending the horse's season, his connections decided to try Moonax over hurdles, with the intention of running him in the Champion Hurdle in March. Those plans were modified after he was beaten at odds-on on his National Hunt debut, finishing second to Sharpical at Huntingdon in December although other races at the Cheltenham Festival were still being considered.

=== 1997: six-year-old season ===
Moonax's hurdling career continued with a third place behind Sanmartino at Leicester, but the experiment was abandoned after he behaved in an "unruly" manner before finishing unplaced at Ludlow a month later.

On his return to flat racing, Moonax ran in the Group Three Ormonde Stakes at Chester. He demonstrated a range of unappealing behaviours: he "slavered rabidly", refused to leave the paddock, walked backwards when being taken to the start and had to be blindfolded to enter the starting stalls. The fact that his groom was dressed in a body protector and padded arm-guards gave the impression that Moonax had become a thoroughly dangerous individual. In the race itself he put up a reasonable effort to finish third. He was then aimed at the Ascot Gold Cup. Moonax started 16/1 and never threatened the leaders, finishing ninth of the thirteen runners behind Celeric in what proved to be his last race.

== Assessment ==
At the 1994 Cartier Racing Awards Moonax was named European Champion Stayer.

Timeform assessed Moonax at a figure 121 in 1994, 122 in 1995 and 120 in 1996. They rated him the joint-best European stayer of 1995, but also awarded him their § or "squiggle" symbol to indicate that he could not be relied upon to produce his best form.

== Stud career ==
Moonax stood at the Clongeel Stud, near Mallow, County Cork, Ireland, where he was mainly used as a sire of National Hunt horses. He sired few horses of consequence, his best winners being the successful handicapper King Killone and the Grade I placed Abbeybraney. At the time of his death in May 2004 he was standing at a fee of €1,000.

== Pedigree ==
Pedigree of Moonax (IRE), chestnut stallion, 1991
Sire Caerleon (USA) 1980	Nijinsky; 1967	Northern Dancer	Nearctic
Sire Caerleon (USA) 1980	Nijinsky; 1967	Northern Dancer	Natalma
Sire Caerleon (USA) 1980	Nijinsky; 1967	Flaming Page	Bull Page
Sire Caerleon (USA) 1980	Nijinsky; 1967	Flaming Page	Flaring Top
Sire Caerleon (USA) 1980	Foreseer; 1969	Round Table	Princequillo
Sire Caerleon (USA) 1980	Foreseer; 1969	Round Table	Knights Daughter
Sire Caerleon (USA) 1980	Foreseer; 1969	Regal Gleam	Hail To Reason
Sire Caerleon (USA) 1980	Foreseer; 1969	Regal Gleam	Miz Carol
Dam Moonsilk (IRE) 1980	Solinus; 1975	Comedy Star	Tom Fool
Dam Moonsilk (IRE) 1980	Solinus; 1975	Comedy Star	Latin Walk
Dam Moonsilk (IRE) 1980	Solinus; 1975	Cawstons Pride	Con Brio
Dam Moonsilk (IRE) 1980	Solinus; 1975	Cawstons Pride	Cawston Tower
Dam Moonsilk (IRE) 1980	Night Attire; 1966	Shantung	Sicambre
Dam Moonsilk (IRE) 1980	Night Attire; 1966	Shantung	Barley Corn
Dam Moonsilk (IRE) 1980	Night Attire; 1966	Twilight Hour	Nearco
Dam Moonsilk (IRE) 1980	Night Attire; 1966	Twilight Hour	Moonstone (Family: 1-w)
