= Buckskin (racehorse) =

French-bred Thoroughbred racehorse

- Sire: Yelapa
- Grandsire: Mossborough
- Dam: Bete a Bon Dieu
- Damsire: Herbager
- Sex: Stallion
- Foaled: 1 April 1973
- Country: France
- Colour: Bay
- Breeder: Dayton Ltd.
- Owner: Daniel Wildenstein
- Trainer: Angel Penna Sr. Peter Walwyn; Henry Cecil
- Record: 19:10-3-2

Major wins
- Prix de Barbeville (1977); Prix Jean Prat (1977); Prix du Cadran (1977, 1978); Doncaster Cup (1978); Jockey Club Cup (1978); Henry II Stakes (1979)

Awards
- Timeform rating 130 (1977), 133 (1978), 131 (1979); Gilbey Champion Stayer (1977); Timeform best stayer (1978, 1979)

Buckskin (1 April 1973 – 19 June 1995) was a French-bred Thoroughbred racehorse and sire. Unraced as a two-year-old, he was trained in France in 1976 and 1977 before being transferred to race the United Kingdom in 1978 and 1979. A specialist stayer, he overcame serious physical problems to win several major long-distance races including the Prix du Cadran (twice), Prix de Barbeville, Prix Jean Prat, Doncaster Cup, Jockey Club Cup and Henry II Stakes. He was also the beaten favourite in three successive runnings of the Ascot Gold Cup. After his retirement from racing, he became a very successful sire of National Hunt horses.

== Background ==
Buckskin was a "lengthy" bay horse with a small white star and a white sock on his right hind foot bred by Dayton Ltd. the breeding company of his owner Daniel Wildenstein. His sire Yelapa won the Grand Critérium in 1968 and stood as a breeding stallion in France for three years with moderate results before being exported to Japan in 1973. Buckskin's dam Bete a Bon Dieu (French for Ladybird) was an unraced daughter of Herbager.

Buckskin was sent into training with the Argentinian Angel Penna Sr. Penna trained may of Wildenstein's best horses including Allez France, Crow, Flying Water and Pawneese.

== Racing career ==
=== 1976: three-year-old season ===
Buckskin was slow to mature and did not run in public until the autumn of his three-year-old season. After finishing unplaced on his debut, he won two minor races in the French provinces over distances of 2100 and 2800 metres. At the end of the season, it appeared likely that the colt's future career would be in hurdle races.

=== 1977: four-year-old season ===
Buckskin began the 1977 season at Évry in March, and won a handicap race over 2800 metres by five lengths. On 3 April, the colt was moved up in class for the Group Three Prix de Barbeville over 3100 metres at Longchamp Racecourse in which he was opposed by the double Ascot Gold Cup winner Sagaro. Ridden by Yves Saint-Martin, he started the 2.6/1 second favourite and, according to Timeform, "slaughtered" the field, winning by twenty lengths from Sagaro, who was in turn eight lengths clear of the other runners. Three weeks later, Buckskin and Sagaro met again in the Prix Jean Prat (now the Prix Vicomtesse Vigier) over the same course and distance. On this occasion, Buckskin started the 1/5 favourite and again won easily, although the margin of victory was only four lengths. Buckskin had been receiving weight from Sagaro on the first two meetings, but when the two met next, in the Group One Prix du Cadran over 4000 metres a month later, it was at level weights. Starting the 3/10 favourite, Buckskin was headed by his rival 300 metres from the finish, but rallied to regain the lead in the closing stages and won by half a length.

In June, Buckskin was sent to England and started favourite for the Ascot Gold Cup, but was beaten five lengths by Sagaro who was being ridden for the first time that year by Lester Piggott, leading to speculation that he needed soft ground to produce his best form. He was less successful when brought back to shorter distances, finishing unplaced in the Prix Kergorlay at Deauville Racecourse in August, having twisted a plate in the race and then running third in Preis von Europa over 2400 metres in Germany. He returned to 4000 metres for the Prix Gladiateur at Longchamp in October, but looked unimpressive before the race and finished third behind the British-trained gelding John Cherry.

=== 1978: five-year-old season ===
In 1978, Buckskin was moved to England to be trained by Peter Walwyn near Lambourn in Berkshire. Walwyn found that the horse had foot problems which made him difficult to train and on his debut for his new handler, Buckskin was disappointing, being well-beaten by Shangamuzo in the inaugural running of the Sagaro Stakes at Ascot in April. Buckskin was fitter when he returned to France three weeks later for his second Prix du Cadran, for which he started favourite and won easily by three lengths from Duky and Hawkberry. At Ascot in June he started 11/8 favourite for the Gold Cup, with his main opposition expected to come from Shangamuzo and the Park Hill Stakes winner Royal Hive. Ridden by Pat Eddery, Buckskin turned into the straight in second place but then faded and finished fourth behind Shangamuzo, Royal Hive and Hawkberry. After the race Wildenstein was highly critical of Eddery, describing him as "a boy" who would never ride for him again, and saying that if Saint-Martin or Lester Piggott had ridden the horse he would have won the race. Walwyn came to the defence of his jockey and shortly afterwards, Wildenstein removed Buckskin from Walwyn's stable and sent him to be trained by Henry Cecil at Newmarket.

Buckskin's training problems worsened, as his flat feet and weak suspensory ligaments made him an extremely fragile horse and in all his subsequent races he appeared with heavily bandaged forelegs. In September he faced a rematch with Shangamuzo in the Doncaster Cup over two and a quarter miles. Ridden by Joe Mercer and starting at odds of 5/2 he took the lead in the straight and drew away from his opponents to win by eight lengths, with Billion taking second ahead of Shangamuzo and Sea Pigeon. Timeform described the performance as "overwhelming". Three weeks later Buckskin ended his season with a win in the Jockey Club Cup at Newmarket Racecourse, beating Shangamuzo by eight lengths.

=== 1979: six-year-old season ===
Despite fears that his legs and feet would not stand up to further training, Buckskin returned as a six-year-old with the Ascot Gold Cup as his objective. He was never allowed to go at full speed in home gallops and poultices were applied to his legs after every piece of work. It was decided that he would have only one preparatory race and that, win-or-lose, the Gold Cup would be his last appearance on the racecourse. Buckskin prepared for the Gold Cup in the Henry II Stakes on soft ground at Sandown Park Racecourse in May. Ridden by Mercer, and starting at odds of 10/11 he drew away from the field in the straight and won by fifteen lengths from Pragmatic (winner of the Yorkshire Cup) and Arapahos. After the race Cecil warned that the horse had only a fifty per cent chance of appearing at Ascot.

In June Buckskin started favourite for the Gold Cup as he had done for the two previous years. Mercer opted to ride the horse in preference to the stable's other runner Le Moss, a four-year-old who had finished second in the St Leger and was partnered by Lester Piggott. Looking somewhat uncomfortable on the firmer ground, Buckskin took the lead half a mile from the finish but was unable to establish a decisive advantage and was challenged in the straight by Le Moss. The stable companions raced together until the final furlong, when Buckskin was eased down by Mercer and finished second, beaten seven lengths by his younger rival. After the race, Cecil virtually ignored the winner, being much more concerned with the condition of the runner-up. In his 1983 memoir On The Level Cecil said that Buckskin's defeat made him "feel like Judas Iscariot".

== Assessment ==
In 1977, the independent Timeform organisation gave Buckskin a rating of 130, three pounds behind Sagaro and seven behind their Horse of the Year Alleged. In the inaugural International Classification, he was rated the equal of Sagaro as the sixth-best horse of any age in Europe, behind Alleged, Blushing Groom, The Minstrel, Balmerino and Orange Bay. Buckskin was named the Champion Stayer of 1977 in the Gilbey Champion racehorse awards, which were decided on points awarded for performances in major races. In the following year, Buckskin was Timeform's best stayer, with a rating of 133. He was rated the fifth-best horse in Europe by the International Classification, behind Alleged, Ile de Bourbon, Acamas and Shirley Heights. In 1979, Buckskin was rated on 131 by Timeform, placing him alongside Le Moss as the year's best stayer. In the International Classification he was rated two pounds below Le Moss and seven pounds below the top-rated older horse, Ile de Bourbon.

In their book, A Century of Champions, based on the Timeform rating system, John Randall and Tony Morris rated Buckskin the best British-trained racehorse foaled in 1973.

Henry Cecil described Buckskin as "the greatest and bravest horse I've trained".

== Stud record ==
Buckskin was retired from racing after his defeat in the 1979 Gold Cup and began his career as a breeding stallion in 1980 at the Fawley Stud near Wantage in Oxfordshire at a fee of £1,500. He had little impact as a sire of flat racers but was much more successful as a sire of National Hunt horses in Ireland. The most successful of his offspring was Amberleigh House the winner of the 2004 Grand National. He also sired Colonel Braxton (Deloitte Novice Hurdle), Black Humour, Minella Lad, Micko's Dream (Thyestes Chase, Fortria Chase), Givus A Buck (National Hunt Handicap Chase), Hidebound (Kennel Gate Novices' Hurdle), Ebony Light (Peter Marsh Chase) and Buck Rogers (John Durkan Memorial Punchestown Chase). He died on 19 June 1995 at the age of twenty-two.

== Pedigree ==
Pedigree of Buckskin, bay stallion 1973
Sire Yelapa (FR) 1966	Mossborough (GB); 1947	Nearco	Pharos
Sire Yelapa (FR) 1966	Mossborough (GB); 1947	Nearco	Nogara
Sire Yelapa (FR) 1966	Mossborough (GB); 1947	All Moonshine	Bobsleigh
Sire Yelapa (FR) 1966	Mossborough (GB); 1947	All Moonshine	Selene
Sire Yelapa (FR) 1966	Your Point (USA); 1955	Nirgal	Goya
Sire Yelapa (FR) 1966	Your Point (USA); 1955	Nirgal	Castillane
Sire Yelapa (FR) 1966	Your Point (USA); 1955	Your Game	Beau Pere
Sire Yelapa (FR) 1966	Your Point (USA); 1955	Your Game	Winkle
Dam Bete a Bon Dieu (FR) 1964	Herbager (FR); 1956	Vandale	Plassy
Dam Bete a Bon Dieu (FR) 1964	Herbager (FR); 1956	Vandale	Vanille
Dam Bete a Bon Dieu (FR) 1964	Herbager (FR); 1956	Flagette	Escamilllo
Dam Bete a Bon Dieu (FR) 1964	Herbager (FR); 1956	Flagette	Fidgette
Dam Bete a Bon Dieu (FR) 1964	Caralline (GB); 1956	Wild Risk	Rialto
Dam Bete a Bon Dieu (FR) 1964	Caralline (GB); 1956	Wild Risk	Wild Violet
Dam Bete a Bon Dieu (FR) 1964	Caralline (GB); 1956	Coral	Colorado Kid
Dam Bete a Bon Dieu (FR) 1964	Caralline (GB); 1956	Coral	Bon Marche (Family: 3-d)
