= Nononito =

French Thoroughbred racehorse

Nononitooo
- Sire: Nikos
- Grandsire: Nonoalco
- Dam: Feuille d'Automne
- Damsire: Crystal Palace
- Sex: Stallion
- Foaled: 1991
- Country: France
- Colour: Bay
- Breeder: Mme P-D Beck
- Owner: Patrick Sebagh
- Trainer: Jean Lesbordes
- Record: 22: 3-5-2 (flat); 13: 6-3-1 (hurdles)
- Earnings: £ 247,615

Major wins
- Prix de Barbeville (1995); Prix du Cadran (1996)

Awards
- European Champion Stayer (1996)

Nononito was a French champion Thoroughbred racehorse and sire. A specialist stayer, he ran twenty-two times on the flat and thirteen times over hurdles in a career which lasted from 1994 until 1998. Although he won only three of his flat races, he was noted for his consistency and ran prominently in numerous top class staying events in France and England. In 1996 he recorded his most important victory in the Group One Prix du Cadran and was awarded the title of European Champion Stayer at the Cartier Racing Awards. After his retirement from racing he had some success at stud as a sire of jump racers before his death in 2007.

== Background ==
Nonito was a dark-coated bay horse with a white star. His sire, the Prix Edmond Blanc winner Nikos had some success with his progeny on the flat but is much better known as a sire of jumpers including the Queen Mother Champion Chase winner Master Minded and the Grade I winners Cenkos (Maghull Novices' Chase) and Nakir (Arkle Challenge Trophy). Nononito's dam, Feuille d'Automne won one race and was a half sister of the Prix Noailles and Prix Hocquart winner Jeu de Paille.

== Racing career ==
=== 1994: three-year-old season ===
Unraced as a two-year-old, Nononito first appeared on the racecourse when he ran three times in the autumn of 1994. He finished fifth on his debut in the Prix du Prince d'Orange over 2000m at Longchamp, then ran second in a race over the same course and distance in October before winning the Listed Prix Le Fabuleux at Saint-Cloud in late November.

=== 1995: four-year-old season ===
Nononito began his four-year-old campaign with two unplaced runs over 2000m before moving up to the staying distances which proved to be his speciality. At Saint-Cloud in May he won his first Group race, quickening clear in the straight to beat The Little Thief and Always Earnest in the Group Three Prix de Barbeville. Although he failed to win in his remaining six starts that year, he established himself as a high class stayer by running second in the Prix Vicomtesse Vigier (to The Little Thief) and the Prix Kergorlay and finishing third to Always Earnest and Moonax in the Group One Prix du Cadran at Longchamp in late September.

=== 1996: five-year-old season ===
Nononito's championship season began with a fourth place in a blanket finish to a Listed race at Évry, but than ran a poor race when unplaced in the Prix de Barbeville. He showed improved form in the Prix Vicomtesse Vigier in late May when he finished strongly to be second to the British-trained Double Eclipse. He was then sent to Royal Ascot for the Gold Cup where he stayed on at one pace in the straight to finish third behind Classic Cliche and Double Trigger.

Nononito continued to run well without winning when running second in the Prix Kergorlay and fourth in the Prix Gladiateur before his second attempt at the Prix du Cadran. He was held up in the early stages before Thierry Jarnet moved him up into a clear lead at the start of the straight. Moonax emerged his most serious challenger but the English colt lost his chance by veering suddenly to his left 200m from the finish. Nononito was driven out to win by a length from Moonax, with Always Earnest third and Double Trigger fifth. On his final start of the year he was well beaten behind Red Roses Story in the Prix Royal Oak, a race in which the genuine stayers were unsuited by the slow early pace which turned the finish of the race into sprint.

=== 1997: six-year-old season ===
Nononito ran twice on the flat in 1997 without recapturing his best form. He finished sixth of seven in the Prix Vicomtesse Vigier and eleventh behind Celeric in the Ascot Gold Cup.

=== Hurdling career ===
Nononito had a brief but successful career over hurdle, winning several races including the Prix Léon Rambaud, the Prix Hypothèse and the Prix Beugnot. He finished third to Mantovo in the 1998 running of France's most important hurdle race, the Grande Course de Haies d'Auteuil.

== Assessment ==
At the 1996 Cartier Racing Awards, Nononito was named European Champion Stayer.

== Stud career ==
Nononito retired to the French National Stud, where he became a successful sire of jump racers. His most notable offspring was Princesse d'Anjou, winner of the Grand Steeple-Chase de Paris in 2006 and 2008. Nononito's death following a heart attack at the age of 16 in 2007 was described as a "great loss" to French breeding.

== Pedigree ==
Pedigree of Nononito (FR), bay stallion, 1991
Sire Nikos (GB) 1981	Nonoalco; 1971	Nearctic	Nearco
Sire Nikos (GB) 1981	Nonoalco; 1971	Nearctic	Lady Angela
Sire Nikos (GB) 1981	Nonoalco; 1971	Seximee	Hasty Road
Sire Nikos (GB) 1981	Nonoalco; 1971	Seximee	Jambo
Sire Nikos (GB) 1981	No No Nanette; 1973	Sovereign Path	Grey Sovereign
Sire Nikos (GB) 1981	No No Nanette; 1973	Sovereign Path	Mountain Path
Sire Nikos (GB) 1981	No No Nanette; 1973	Nuclea	Orsini
Sire Nikos (GB) 1981	No No Nanette; 1973	Nuclea	Nixe
Dam Feuille d'Automne (FR) 1979	Crystal Palace; 1974	Caro	Fortino
Dam Feuille d'Automne (FR) 1979	Crystal Palace; 1974	Caro	Chambord
Dam Feuille d'Automne (FR) 1979	Crystal Palace; 1974	Hermieres	Sicambre
Dam Feuille d'Automne (FR) 1979	Crystal Palace; 1974	Hermieres	Vielle Pierre
Dam Feuille d'Automne (FR) 1979	Serbie; 1972	Breton	Relko
Dam Feuille d'Automne (FR) 1979	Serbie; 1972	Breton	La Melba
Dam Feuille d'Automne (FR) 1979	Serbie; 1972	Serjanie	Seriphos
Dam Feuille d'Automne (FR) 1979	Serbie; 1972	Serjanie	Windy Cliff (Family:2-f)
