= Grès =

French fashion house (1903–1993)

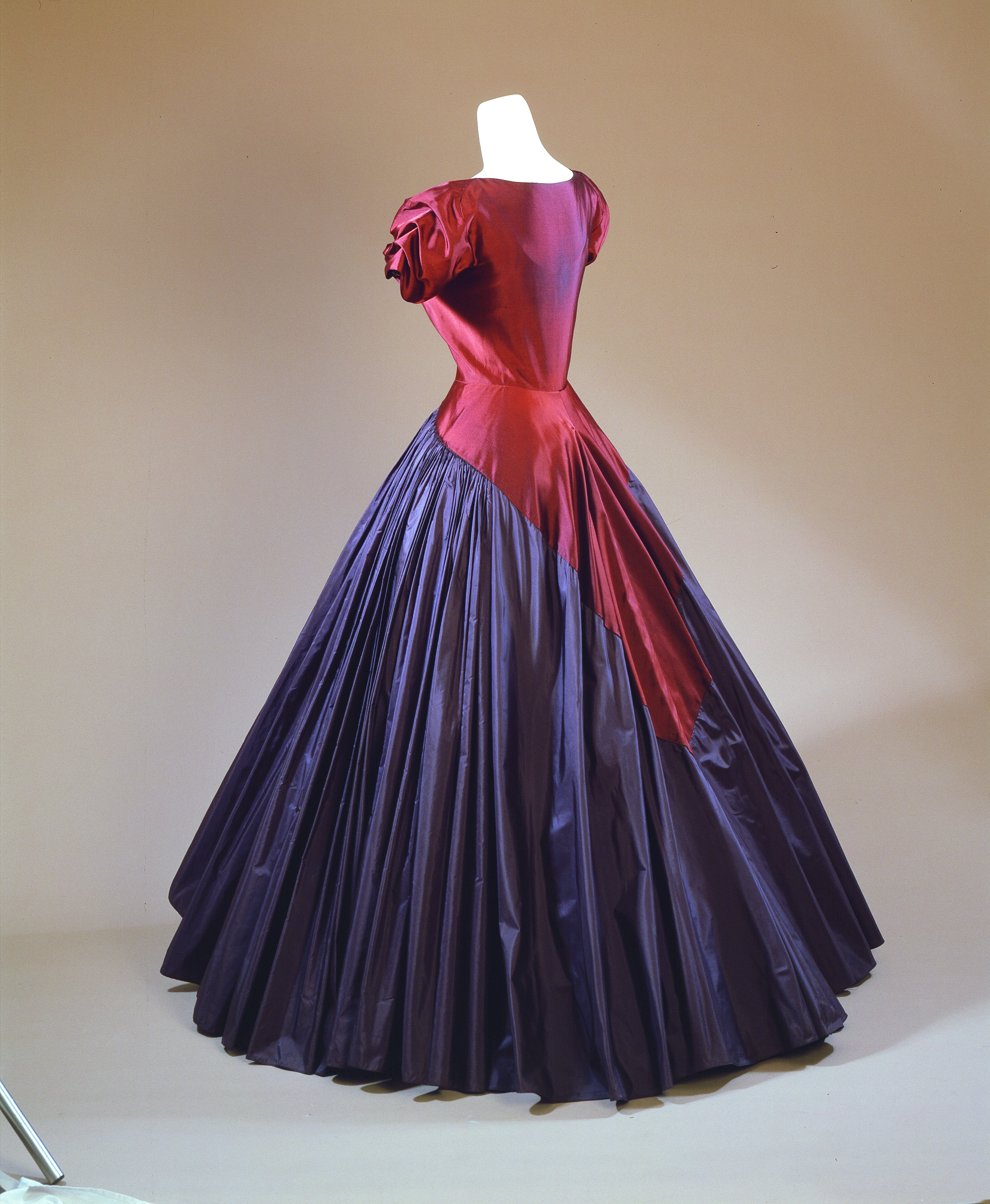
1951 Grès ballgown. Silk taffeta. Shenkar Archive.

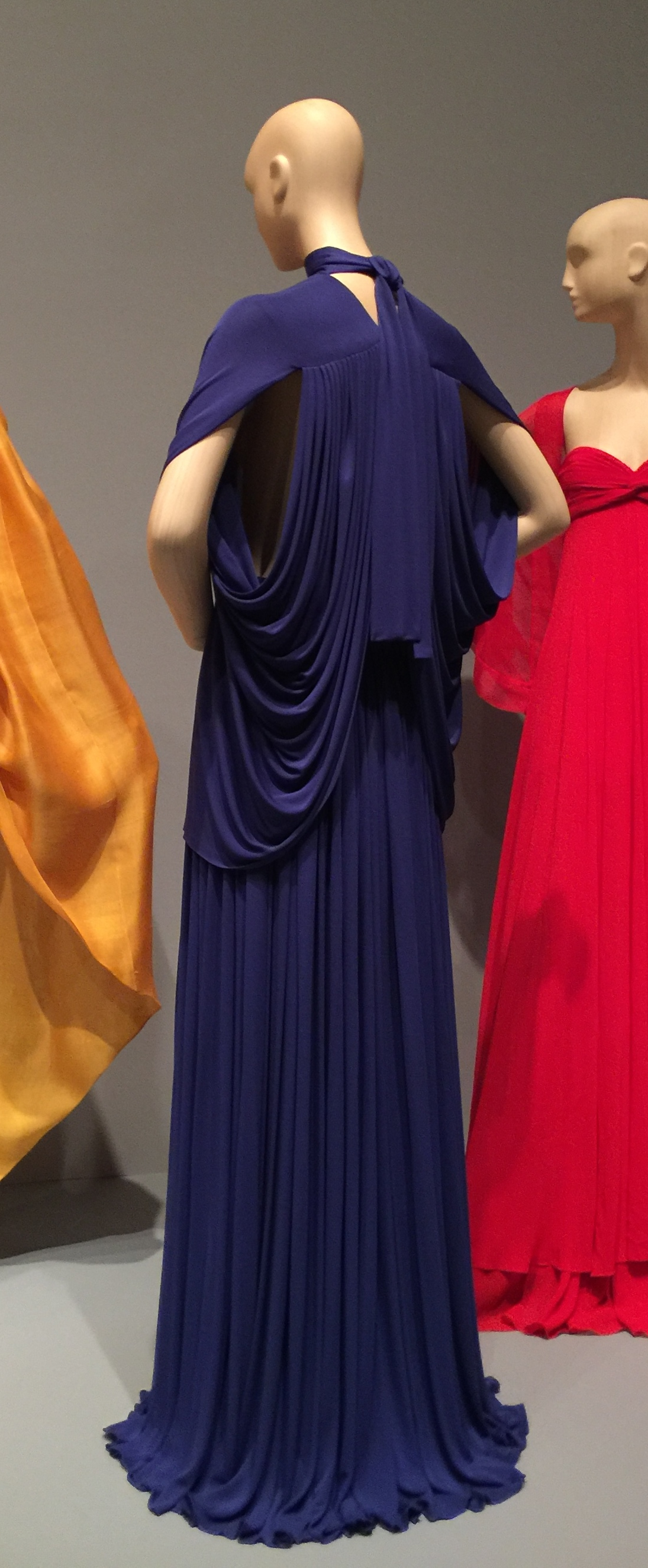
Draped jersey evening gown by Madame Grès, c.1981. (PMA)

Grès was a French haute couture fashion house founded by Madame Grès in 1942. Parfums Grès is the associated perfume house, which still exists, and is now based in Switzerland.

== History ==
Germaine Émilie Krebs (1903–1993), known as Alix Barton and later as "Madame Grès", relaunched her design house under the name Grès in Paris in 1942. Prior to this, she worked as "Alix" or "Alix Grès" during the 1930s. Formally trained as a sculptor, she produced haute couture designs for an array of fashionable women, including the Duchess of Windsor, Marlene Dietrich, Greta Garbo, Jacqueline Kennedy, and Dolores del Río. Her signature was cut-outs on gowns that made exposed skin part of the design, yet still had a classical, sophisticated feel. She was renowned for being the last of the haute couture houses to establish a ready-to-wear line, which she called a "prostitution".

The name Grès was a partial anagram of her husband's first name and alias. He was Serge Czerefkov, a Russian painter, who left her soon after the house's creation. Grès enjoyed years of critical successes but, after Grès herself sold the business in the 1980s to Yagi Tsucho, a Japanese company, they hired Lloyd Klein as the artistic director for the entire house supervising 46 licencies between Paris and Japan. At the time, Klein was offered one of the highest salaries of 150000 FRF per month and an annual fee of 12 million FRF. After the death of Madame Grès, Lloyd Klein left the house to continue his collections in New York. By 2012, the last Grès store in Paris was closed.

Some of Grès' work is exhibited at the Palais Galliera in Paris.

== Style ==
The Grès house produced many Hellenic, draped dresses. The influence of Grès' sculpting years is very visible.

== Parfums Grès ==
Grès's signature fragrance was Cabochard, created by Bernard Chant, and launched in 1958. As of January 2017, Cabochard is still being manufactured and retailed. Other perfumes, launched after the sale of the company, include:

- Cabotine (1990)
- Folie Douce (1997)
- Cabaret (2003)
- Caline (2005)
- Caline Night (2006)
- Sphinx Hommage a Greta Garbo (a fragrance dedicated to the actress Greta Garbo).

== Biography ==
- Laurence Benaïm, Madame Grès, Editions Assouline, 1999 (in French)
- Patricia Mears, Madame Grès: Sphinx of Fashion, Yale University Press, 2008
