= Rite of Passage (horse) =

British-bred Thoroughbred racehorse (2004–2023)

Rite Of Passage
- Sire: Giant's Causeway
- Grandsire: Storm Cat
- Dam: Dahlia's Krissy
- Damsire: Kris S
- Sex: Gelding
- Foaled: 29 March 2004
- Died: May 2023 (aged 19)
- Country: United Kingdom
- Colour: Chestnut
- Breeder: Newsells Park Stud
- Owner: Christopher McHale; Dr Ronan Lamb
- Trainer: Dermot Weld
- Record: 11: 7-0-3
- Earnings: £223,244

Major wins
- Ascot Gold Cup (2010); British Champions Long Distance Cup (2012)

Awards
- European Champion Stayer (2010)

Rite Of Passage (29 March 2004 – May 2023) was a British-bred, Irish-trained Thoroughbred racehorse best known for winning the Ascot Gold Cup and being named Cartier Racing Award for European Champion Stayer in 2010. His career was unusual in the fact that he established himself as a high-class performer under National Hunt rules before moving to flat-racing. His win in the Gold Cup came in his third start under flat rules.

== Background ==
Rite Of Passage was bred by the Hertfordshire-based Newsells Park Stud. He was sired by the European Horse of the Year Giant's Causeway out of the mare Dahlia's Krissy. After retiring to stud in 2001 Giant's Causeway sired the winners of more than three hundred races, including 26 at Group One/Grade I level. His best winners include Shamardal, Aragorn and Eskendereya. Dahlia's Krissy was a winner in the United States and a granddaughter of the Champion racemare Dahlia.

Rite Of Passage was inbred to both Roberto and Northern Dancer (see below).

Rite Of Passage was sent to the Tattersalls October sale as a yearling where he was bought by Dermot Weld for 20,000 gns. Weld trained the horse at his base near the Curragh. Rite Of Passage was ridden by Robbie McNamara in most of his National Hunt starts and by Pat Smullen in all of his flat races.

Rite Of Passage died in May 2023, at the age of 19.

== Racing career ==
=== 2008/2009 season: National Hunt flat races ===
Rite Of Passage began his racing career by running in National Hunt flat races or "bumpers". These are races designed to give experience to potential jumpers and are run at National Hunt meetings. Rite Of Passage won one of these events, at Galway in August 2008, starting the 9/4 favourite and beating 19 rivals "very easily". Six months later he reappeared at Naas in a similar event and won by six lengths from the odds-on favourite Quadrillon before being sent to the Cheltenham Festival for the Grade I Champion Bumper where Pat Smullen replaced the amateur Robbie McNamara as his jockey. The race appeared to lie between Rite Of Passage, who was made 5/2 favourite, and another unbeaten Irish horse Dunguib. Rite Of Passage moved up to dispute the lead two furlongs out but looked outpaced in the closing stages and finished third, ten lengths behind Dunguib. On his final "bumper" appearance at the Curragh in May he was made odds-on favourite, but finished fourth.

=== 2009 Flat season ===
Rite Of Passage was switched to conventional flat racing and won both his starts. As his wins had been under National Hunt rules he was still eligible to run in maiden races and was an odds-on winner of such a race at Ballinrobe in September. He was then sent to Leopardstown for a two-mile handicap. Smullen sent the gelding into the lead two and a half furlongs from the finish and soon went clear. Although he was eased down in the closing stages, Rite Of Passage won by eight lengths from the favourite Donna's Palm.

=== 2009/2010 season: Novice hurdles ===
In the National Hunt season of 2009/2010, Rite Of Passage was campaigned in Novice hurdle races. These are races for horses which have not won a race over hurdles before the start of the season. In January at Leopardstown he won on his hurdling debut, when his only danger came when he was carried wide by a loose (riderless) horse on the turn into the straight. At Punchestown a month later he won another novices' race "comfortably" at odds of 2/7, before returning to Cheltenham for the Grade I Baring Novices' Hurdle. For the second year in succession Rite Of Passage was an unsuccessful Festival favourite, finishing third to the undefeated Peddlers Cross.

=== 2010 Flat season ===
At Royal Ascot Rite Of Passage ran in his third conventional flat race, the Group One Ascot Gold Cup over two and a half miles for which he started a 20/1 outsider. He raced in third and survived a "barging match" with the tiring Akmal (for which Smullen was subsequently disciplined) to challenge Age of Aquarius for the lead a furlong out. The two horses raced together to the line with Rite Of Passage maintaining a narrow advantage to win by a neck. It was his trainer's first success in the race after narrow failures with the notable stayers Vintage Crop and Vinnie Roe in 1994 and 2002 respectively. Weld emphasised the importance of stamina in the victory, quoting Lester Piggott who had reportedly told him that "there's a big difference between horses that go two miles and horses that go two and a half."

The Irish St Leger was scheduled as Rite Of Passage's next run, but he was withdrawn from the race after performing poorly in training, A plan to run in the Melbourne Cup did not materialise, and Weld decided to rest the gelding in the winter, rather than campaigning him over hurdles.

=== 2011 Flat season ===
Rite Of Passage did not run for more than eleven months after his Gold Cup win. On his reappearance he finished third to Fame and Glory in the Saval Beg Stakes. Although Rite Of Passage lost his unbeaten record in flat races, Weld was "very pleased" with his horse's performance.

Rite Of Passage was aimed at a second Gold Cup, but had problems in training, and was ruled out of the race by Weld five days before the event.

=== 2012 Flat season ===
Rite Of Passage did not reappear until October 2012, when he made a successful return to the course after 510 days by winning the British Champions Long Distance Cup at Ascot's Champions Day fixture. It was his final race; he was retired and in 2015 was moved to the Irish National Stud. His death was announced on 30 May 2023.

== Assessment ==
Despite having run only one race in the 2010 flat season Rite Of Passage was named European Champion Stayer at the Cartier Racing Awards.

In the 2010 World Thoroughbred Racehorse Rankings, Rite Of Passage was assessed at 118, making him the fourth best horse in the world in the Extended division behind So You Think, Americain and Arctic Cosmos.

== Pedigree ==
Pedigree of Rite of Passage (GB), chestnut gelding, 2004
| Sire Giant's Causeway (USA) 1997 | Storm Cat; 1983 | Storm Bird | Northern Dancer* |
| Sire Giant's Causeway (USA) 1997 | Storm Cat; 1983 | Storm Bird | South Ocean |
| Sire Giant's Causeway (USA) 1997 | Storm Cat; 1983 | Terlingua | Secretariat |
| Sire Giant's Causeway (USA) 1997 | Storm Cat; 1983 | Terlingua | Crimson Saint |
| Sire Giant's Causeway (USA) 1997 | Mariah's Storm; 1991 | Rahy | Blushing Groom |
| Sire Giant's Causeway (USA) 1997 | Mariah's Storm; 1991 | Rahy | Glorious Song |
| Sire Giant's Causeway (USA) 1997 | Mariah's Storm; 1991 | Immense | Roberto* |
| Sire Giant's Causeway (USA) 1997 | Mariah's Storm; 1991 | Immense | Imsodear |
| Dam Dahlia's Krissy (USA) 1996 | Kris S 1977 | Roberto* | Hail To Reason |
| Dam Dahlia's Krissy (USA) 1996 | Kris S 1977 | Roberto* | Bramalea |
| Dam Dahlia's Krissy (USA) 1996 | Kris S 1977 | Sharp Queen | Princequillo |
| Dam Dahlia's Krissy (USA) 1996 | Kris S 1977 | Sharp Queen | Bridgework |
| Dam Dahlia's Krissy (USA) 1996 | Dahlia's Image; 1985 | Lyphard | Northern Dancer* |
| Dam Dahlia's Krissy (USA) 1996 | Dahlia's Image; 1985 | Lyphard | Goofed |
| Dam Dahlia's Krissy (USA) 1996 | Dahlia's Image; 1985 | Dahlia | Vaguely Noble |
| Dam Dahlia's Krissy (USA) 1996 | Dahlia's Image; 1985 | Dahlia | Charming Alibi (Family: 13-c) |

- Rite Of Passage is inbred 3x4 to Roberto. This means that the stallion appears in both the third and fourth generations of his pedigree. He is also inbred 4x4 to Northern Dancer.
