= Colour Vision (horse) =

French-bred Thoroughbred racehorse

- Racing silks of Hamdan bin Mohammed Al Maktoum and Godolphin
- Sire: Rainbow Quest
- Grandsire: Blushing Groom
- Dam: Give Me Five
- Damsire: Monsun
- Sex: Gelding
- Foaled: 22 February 2008
- Country: France
- Colour: Grey
- Breeder: Capricorn Stud
- Owner: Hamdan bin Mohammed Al Maktoum; Godolphin
- Trainer: Mark Johnston; Saeed bin Suroor
- Record: 27: 6-1-5
- Earnings: £352,484

Major wins
- Sagaro Stakes (2012); Ascot Gold Cup (2012)

Awards
- Cartier Champion Stayer (2012)

Colour Vision (foaled 22 February 2008) is a Thoroughbred racehorse best known for his win in 2012 Ascot Gold Cup. He was bred in France, sired by an American stallion out of a German mare and was trained in Britain and the United Arab Emirates.

As a two-year-old he won once from four starts and was gelded at the end of the year. In 2011 he showed steady improvement when moved up to longer distances, winning three minor races and finishing third in both the Cesarewitch Handicap and the British Champions Long Distance Cup.

He reached his peak as a four-year-old in the first half of 2012 when he won the Sagaro Stakes in track record time before taking the Gold Cup. He went on to finish third in the Goodwood Cup and the Prix du Cadran and was voted the Cartier Champion Stayer of 2012. Colour Vision failed to reproduce his best form in 2013, but ran well to finish fourth behind Estimate in the Gold Cup. He was retired from racing at the end of the year.

== Background ==
Colour Vision is a grey gelding bred in France by the Capricorn Stud. As a yearling he was consigned to the Tattersalls yearling sale in October 2009 and was bought for 100,000 guineas by the trainer Mark Johnston. The colt entered the ownership of Hamdan bin Mohammed Al Maktoum the Crown Prince of Dubai, and was taken into training by Johnston at Middleham Moor in North Yorkshire.

Colour Vision was sired by Rainbow Quest who won the Prix de l'Arc de Triomphe before becoming a very successful breeding stallion. Rainbow Quest's other progeny included Quest for Fame, Saumarez, Raintrap, Nedawi, Armiger, Spectrum and Millenary. His dam Give Me Five, from whom he inherited his grey colour, was a successful racehorse in Germany, winning the Group Three Frankfurter Stutenpreis as a three-year-old in 2004. She was descended from the German broodmare Grolldochnicht (foaled 1952) who was the female line ancestor of Gaia (Irish Oaks) and Authaal (Irish St. Leger).

== Racing career ==
=== 2010: two-year-old season ===
On his racecourse debut Colour Vision started a 25/1 outsider for a maiden race over one mile at Newmarket Racecourse on 13 August and finished eleventh of the twelve runners. Viewed retrospectively, the race was one of the strongest maidens ever staged at the course as Frankel finished first ahead of Nathaniel and Genius Beast (Sandown Classic Trial). Two weeks later he contested a less competitive maiden over the same distance at Thirsk Racecourse and recorded his first success as he stayed on in the closing stages to win by half a length at odds of 18/1. In his two remaining races Colour Vision ran very poorly as he finished last in "nurseries" (handicap races for two-year-olds) at Doncaster in September and Epsom in October.

=== 2011: three-year-old season ===
Colour Vision began his second season promisingly as he finished a close third to Brown Panther in a handicap over one and a half miles at Chester Racecourse on 4 May but then finished unplaced in handicaps over the same distance at Musselburgh and Salisbury in June. When he was stepped up in distance for a two-mile handicap at Chester in July he showed much better form and won by four and a half lengths from the four-year-old filly Never Can Tell. Six days later Colour Vision was assigned a weight of 139 pounds for a handicap over one and three quarter miles at Haydock Park and improved again. Starting the 13/8 favourite he took the lead three furlongs from the finish and drew away in the straight to win by ten and a half lengths despite being eased down in the final strides. In a handicap at Ascot Racecourse a week later he finished second to the four-year-old Keys after repeatedly veering to the left and swishing his tail in the closing stages.

With his weights in handicap races rising, Colour Vision was switched to compete in weight-for-age races starting with a trip to France for the Listed Prix Michel Houyvet at Deauville Racecourse on 15 August. He finished fourth of the seven runners behind Gaily Game after again failing to keep a straight course in the closing stages. Two poor performances followed in September as he ran unplaced in a minor race at Salisbury and the Listed Stand Cup at Chester. On 3 October the colt started 11/8 second favourite for the Phil Bull Trophy, a minor weight-for-age event over at Pontefract Racecourse. Ridden by Silvestre de Sousa, who had partnered the colt in his win at Haydock, he took the lead three furlongs out and won "readily" by two and three quarter lengths from Fire Fighter.

Five days after his Pontefract win, Colour Vision carried a weight of 127 pounds in the Cesarewitch, one of Britain's biggest staying handicaps, over two and a quarter miles at Newmarket and finished third of the thirty-three runners behind Never Can Tell. Colour Vision was back on the track a week later and moved up to Group Three class for the British Champions Long Distance Cup over two miles at Ascot. With de Sousa in the saddle he was restrained in the early stages before producing a strong late run on the outside to take third place behind Fame and Glory and the favourite Opinion Poll.

At the end of 2011 Colour Vision was transferred to the ownership of Godolphin Racing, the racing operation of Hamdan bin Mohammed Al Maktoum's father Sheikh Mohammed. He joined the training stable of Saeed bin Suroor and spent the winter in Dubai.

=== 2012: four-year-old season ===
On his first appearance as a four-year-old Colour Vision contested the Group Three Sagaro Stakes on 2 May. The race was run that year on the Polytrack surface at Kempton Park Racecourse after the meeting at Ascot was abandoned owing to waterlogging. Ridden for the first time by Frankie Dettori he started the 9/2 fourth choice in a six-runner field with the John Gosden-trained Thimaar starting favourite ahead of Barbican and Red Cadeaux. After being restrained at the rear of the six-runner field he produced a strong run in the straight to take the lead inside the furlong. He stayed on well to win by one and a half lengths from Red Cadeaux with a gap of nine lengths back to Thimaar in third. The winning time of 3:21.50 broke the previous track record by almost three seconds. Godolphin's racing manager Simon Crisford said "He won well, travelled well and showed a good turn of foot in the straight. He definitely goes for the Gold Cup, as he stays all day... In fact, the further he goes, the better he is".

In the Ascot Gold Cup on 21 June Dettori opted to ride Colour Vision in preference to Godolphin's other runner Opinion Poll who was trained by Mahmood Al Zarooni and ridden by Mickael Barzalona. In the build up to the race there had been speculation that Dettori's position as Godolphin's top jockey was under threat from Baralona, who was regarded as the team's rising star. Fame and Glory started 4/5 favourite to repeat his 2011 win in the race with the next three in the betting being the Doncaster Cup winner Saddler's Rock (9/2), Opinion Poll (5/1) and Colour Vision (6/1). The other five runners were outsiders, starting at odds of 25/1 or more. Dettori settled the gelding just behind the leaders as Gulf of Naples set a steady pace but then made a forward move in the straight. He took the lead approaching the final furlong and rallied after being headed by Opinion Poll to regain the advantage and win by half a length. Saddler's Rock was a neck away in third ahead of Gulf of Naples with Fame and Glory running poorly to finish seventh. The racecourse stewards held an inquiry into possible interference between the first two finishers but left the result unaltered. After the race Dettori, who had celebrated with his customary flying dismount, commented "I am delighted for the team and myself, as it has been a very hard week, so I'm glad this one came up. We have a great team and it's a brilliant result for us. It's a joy to win. Me and Mickael are great friends, but you are by yourself when you are out there and you want to win for yourself. It doesn't matter who is in the finish as you always try to win."

After a six-week absence, Colour Vision started second favourite when carrying top weight of 137 pounds for the Goodwood Cup on 2 August. After racing prominently he took second place behind Saddler's Rock in the straight but could make no further progress and lost the runner-up spot in the final strides to Askar Tau. In the Doncaster Cup on 14 September he took the lead three furlongs out but faded in the closing stages and finished seventh of the nine finishers behind Times Up. In the Prix du Cadran over 4000 metres on heavy ground at Longchamp Racecourse on 7 October he finished third behind Molly Malone and Hi Jinx with Saddler's Rock in fourth place. Two weeks later he ran for the second time in the British Champions Long Distance Cup but after racing in third place he dropped from contention and finished tailed-off last of the nine runners.

=== 2013: five-year-old season ===
Colour Vision remained in training as a five-year-old but finished no better than fourth in his five starts. After finishing seventh behind the French filly Gloomy Sunday in the Henry II Stakes at Sandown Park Racecourse on 30 May he attempted to repeat his 2012 success in the Ascot Gold Cup. Starting at odds of 12/1 he took the lead approaching the last quarter mile but was overtaken a furlong out and finished fourth behind Estimate. In his three remaining races, he finished seventh behind Brown Panther in the Goodwood Cup, sixth in the Lonsdale Cup at York Racecourse in August, and fifth to Times Up in the Doncaster Cup on 13 September.

== Assessment and awards ==
In November 2012 at the Cartier Racing Award Colour Vision was voted the year's Champion Stayer. In the 2012 World Thoroughbred Rankings Colour Vision's rating of 117 made him only the 123rd best horse in the world but the fourth best over Extended distances behind Encke, Green Moon and Orfevre.

== Pedigree ==
Pedigree of Colour Vision (FR), grey gelding, 2008
| Sire Rainbow Quest (USA) 1981 | Blushing Groom (FR); 1974 | Red God | Nasrullah |
| Sire Rainbow Quest (USA) 1981 | Blushing Groom (FR); 1974 | Red God | Spring Run |
| Sire Rainbow Quest (USA) 1981 | Blushing Groom (FR); 1974 | Runaway Bride | Wild Risk |
| Sire Rainbow Quest (USA) 1981 | Blushing Groom (FR); 1974 | Runaway Bride | Aimee |
| Sire Rainbow Quest (USA) 1981 | I Will Follow (USA); 1975 | Herbager | Vandale |
| Sire Rainbow Quest (USA) 1981 | I Will Follow (USA); 1975 | Herbager | Flagette |
| Sire Rainbow Quest (USA) 1981 | I Will Follow (USA); 1975 | Where You Lead | Raise a Native |
| Sire Rainbow Quest (USA) 1981 | I Will Follow (USA); 1975 | Where You Lead | Noblesse |
| Dam Give Me Five (GER) 2001 | Monsun (GER); 1990 | Königsstuhl | Dschingis Khan |
| Dam Give Me Five (GER) 2001 | Monsun (GER); 1990 | Königsstuhl | Konigskronung |
| Dam Give Me Five (GER) 2001 | Monsun (GER); 1990 | Mosella | Surumu |
| Dam Give Me Five (GER) 2001 | Monsun (GER); 1990 | Mosella | Monasia |
| Dam Give Me Five (GER) 2001 | Grey Pearl (GER); 1989 | Magic Mirror | Nureyev |
| Dam Give Me Five (GER) 2001 | Grey Pearl (GER); 1989 | Magic Mirror | Turkish Treasure |
| Dam Give Me Five (GER) 2001 | Grey Pearl (GER); 1989 | Gettysburg | Alpenkonig |
| Dam Give Me Five (GER) 2001 | Grey Pearl (GER); 1989 | Gettysburg | Goneril (Family: 1-a) |
