= Madame Grès =

French grand couturier

- Born: Germaine Émilie Krebs; 30 November 1903; Paris, France
- Died: 24 November 1993 (aged 89)
- Organization: Grès
- Spouse: Serge Czerefkov
- Children: 1

Madame Grès (1903–1993), also known as Alix Grès and Alix, was a leading French couturier and costume designer, founder of haute couture fashion house Grès as well as the associated Parfums Grès. Remembered as the "Sphinx of Fashion", Grès was notoriously secretive about her personal life and was seen as a workaholic with a furious attention to detail, preferring to let her work do the talking. Grès, best known for her floor-length draped Grecian goddess gowns, is noted as the "master of the wrapped and draped dress" and the "queen of drapery". Grès's minimalistic draping techniques and her attention to and respect for the female body have had a lasting effect on the haute couture and fashion industry, inspiring a number of recent designers.

== Biography ==
=== Early life ===
Grès was born Germaine Émilie Krebs to a middle-class French Jewish family and raised in Paris, France. Early in life, she studied painting and sculpting. Grès originally dreamed of becoming a sculptor, but after many objections made by her family she shifted her interests towards the art of fashion design and clothing making. Using her formal training in sculpture, Grès was able to apply her sculpting techniques to her fabric forms. Grès's first job in the industry of fashion was as a woman's hat maker, where she excelled, until she began focusing on couture dressmaking. After distinguishing her area of interest, Grès received her early training in haute couture dressmaking at the fashion house Maison Premet, a house known for requiring extreme perfection.

=== Alix era ===
In 1932, Grès opened her first couture fashion house, La Maison Alix. In 1933, Grès and her coworker, Juliette Barton, combined their names to create Alix Barton, which she designed under for a short amount of time. Grès dropped the "Barton" in 1934 and designed under her own name, "Alix", for the remainder of the 1930s and up until 1942. During this time, Grès's signature style of classical drapery and elegant gowns became the signature of the couture fashion house. At this time she became known for her technique of using live mannequins, designing and creating garments directly on the models. Her early work shows Greco-Roman sculpture influences as well as simple lines and attention to the female body. Her preferred media during this time were silk jersey and paper taffeta. While operating her haute couture fashion house under the name Alix, she first gained positive attention and critical acclaim for designing costumes for Jean Giraudoux's 1935 play, "The Trojan War Will Not Take Place". After receiving much applause for her theatrical costume designs, Grès became one of the leading designers of that time, designing for many notable figures such as the Duchess of Windsor, Paloma Picasso, Grace Kelly, Marlene Dietrich, and Greta Garbo.

=== Madame Grès era ===
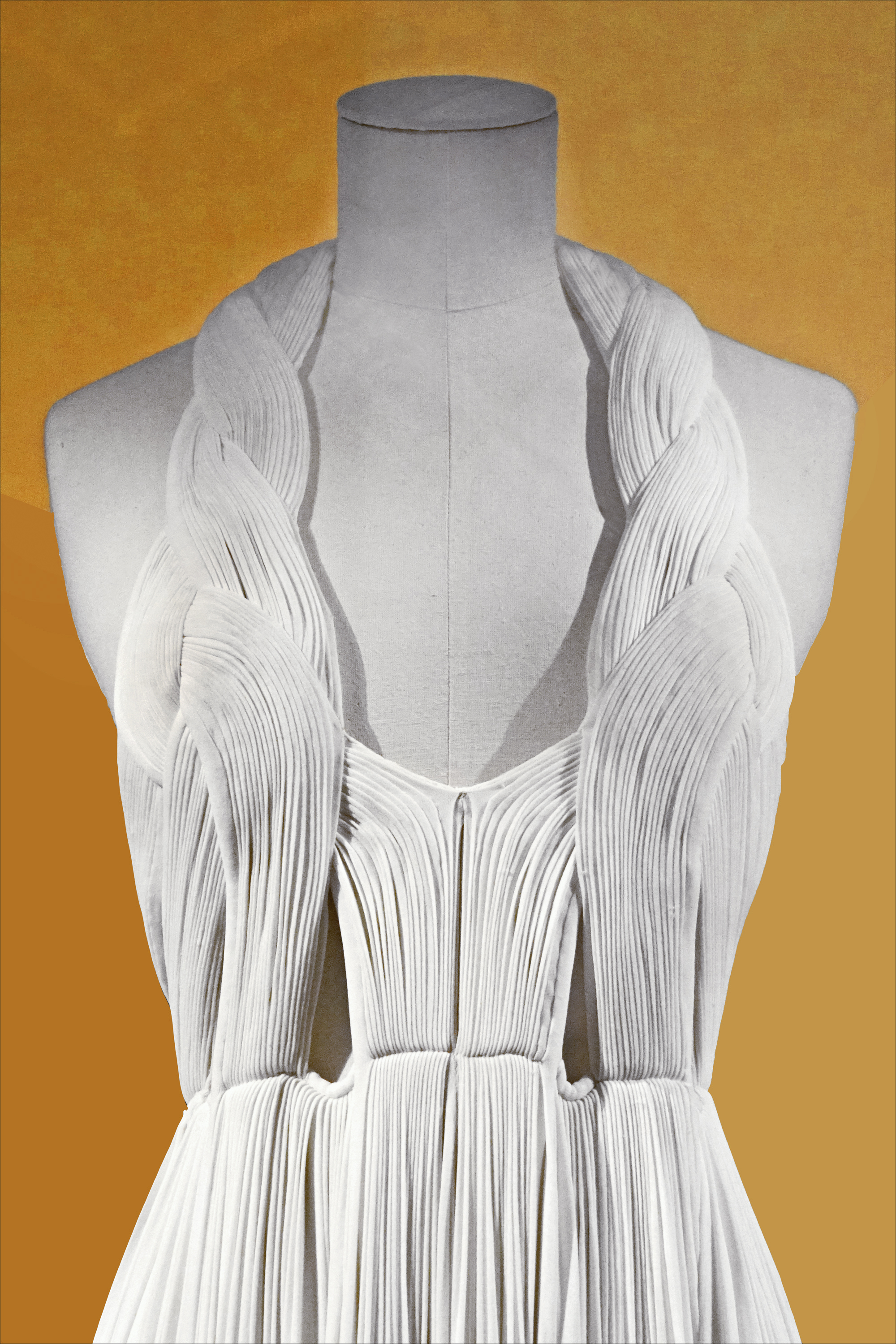
Grès evening gown, intricately draped pleated jersey, 1975 (Palais Galliera)

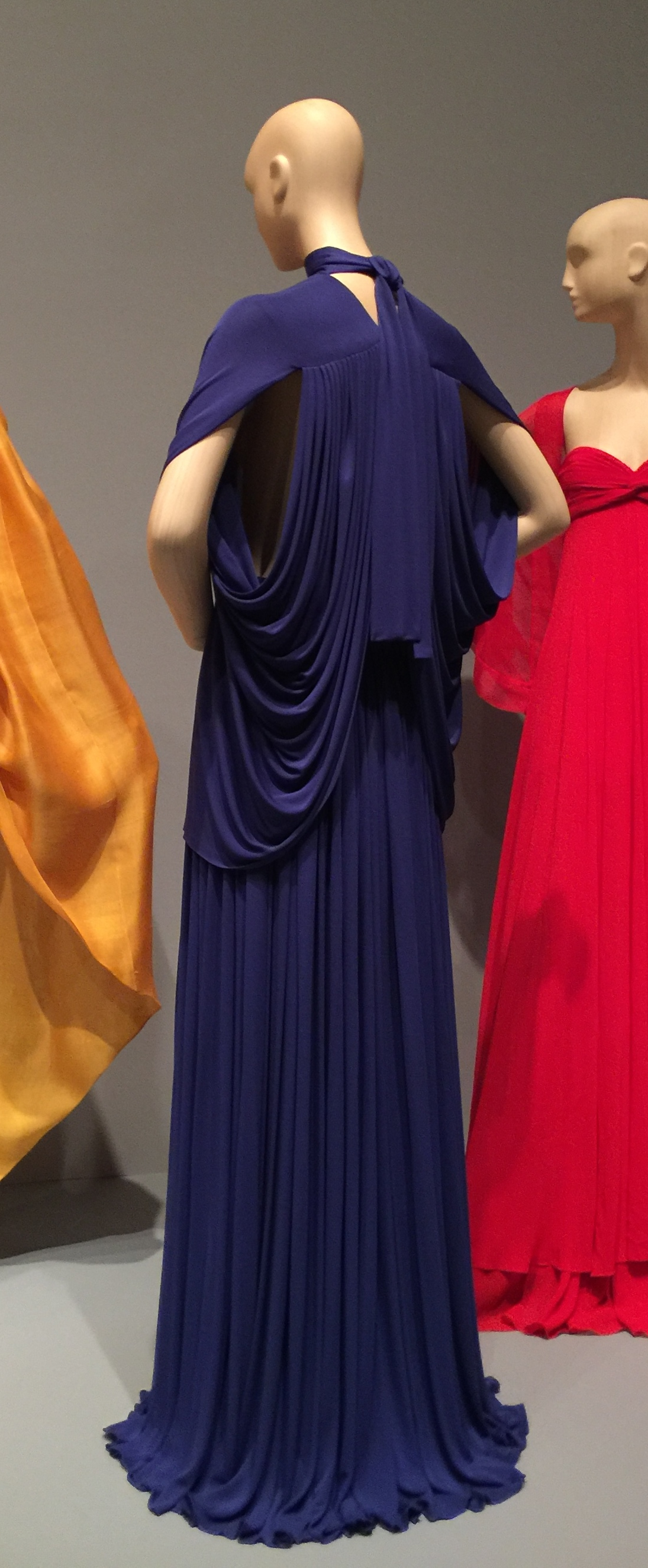
Draped jersey Grès evening gown c.1981. (PMA)

In 1942, after marrying Russian painter Serge Czerefkov, Grès began designing under the name "Madame Grès", a partial anagram of her husband's first name. During World War II, after creation of the Madame Grès label, German troops invaded Paris and soon occupied it. During the war, German forces demanded that Madame Grès design bleak and utilitarian clothing which was in complete contrast to her entire collection. Wives of German officers also requested Grès to design dresses for them, despite the fact that she was Jewish; she refused, and one of her gowns from this period features two small Stars of David sewn on the inside. Grès defied their orders and continued to design garments that mirrored the colors of the French flag. Consequentially, German forces ordered Grès's haute couture fashion house to be closed, claiming her generous use of fabric during wartime as their reason. After the closing of her first couture house, Grès fled to the Pyrenees and stayed there until Paris was liberated. In 1944, with the closing of her first couture house, Grès began designing again and opened her second house, returning to her now signature name, Madame Grès. Throughout the 1940s, Madame Grès began constructing and perfecting her most notable garments, the elegantly draped Grecian goddess gowns. These dresses could take anywhere up to three hundred hours to complete with each pleat being done by hand, draping the cloth so the body shaped the dress. Grès's signature dress perfectly captures who Grès was as a fashion designer. Her painstaking attention to detail, regard for the human body, and minimalistic effects can be seen in each of her gowns. In the 1950s, Grès experimented with simpler cuts and purer lines using ethnic traditions such as saris, kimono and serapes as her inspiration. In addition, Grès tried her hand at tailoring women's suits over the course of the 1950s. Grès's design focus remained mostly on her couture gowns throughout the rest of her career. Grès debuted her bestselling fragrance, Cabochard (which translates to "stubborn"), in 1959 . In 1970, Grès strayed away from her signature draping style and highlighted naked flesh via constructing vertical peek-a-boo openings in the bodice. In 1980, she launched her first two ready-to-wear collections in collaboration with the designer Peggy Huynh Kinh. Then she reiterated in 1983, with a collection whose manufacturing process she wanted to master from start to finish. Grès continued to design at her fashion house up until her 80s when she retired in the late 1980s. The final garment designed by her was a swelling bodice dress ordered by Hubert de Givenchy in 1989. Soon after Madame Grès retired from it, The House of Grès began to suffer. In 1984, it was bought by Bernard Tapie, and then later Jacques Esterel. Due to unpaid rent, a bankruptcy petition was issued and the house's assets were liquidated. It was then sold to Yagi Tsusho Limited, a Japanese company, which in 1993 hired Lloyd Klein as the head designer.

=== Retirement and death ===
After retiring, Madame Grès lived life in even more seclusion than before. Due to poor business dealings regarding the licensing of her signature perfume, Cabochard, Madame Grès lost the fortune that she worked six decades to build, leaving her living in poverty. With help from friends, Hubert de Givenchy, Pierre Cardin, and Yves Saint Laurent, Grès was able to rent an apartment in the 16th arrondissement in Paris and continue sewing garments for friends. In 1993, Grès's daughter, Anne, moved her to a retirement home in near Toulon, France. Grès died on 24 November 1993, at age 89. Her death was made public a year later.

=== Marriage and children ===
Madame Grès married Serge Czerefkov, a Russian painter, in the late 1930s. The two had one daughter named Anne at some point during their marriage. Grès's daughter is most notable for concealing her mother's death in 1993 for over a year and forging Grès's handwriting in documents.

== Awards ==
- Named Chevalier of the Legion of Honour in 1947
- Elected President of Chambre Syndicale of Paris Couture in 1972
- Dé d'Or (Golden Thimble) for dressmaking by Cartier in 1976
- New York University Creative Leadership in the Arts Award in 1978
- Named "Best in Italy” by the National Chamber of Italian Haute Couture

== Bibliography ==
- Martin, Richard, and Harold Koda, Madame Grès, The Metropolitan Museum of Art, 1994 (available for download)
- Patricia Mears, Madame Grès : Sphinx of Fashion, Yale University Press, 2008
- Olivier Saillard, Madame Grès: Sculptural Fashion, Cannibal/Hannibal Publishers, 2012
