= Westerner (horse) =

British-bred Thoroughbred racehorse

- Sire: Danehill
- Grandsire: Danzig
- Dam: Walensee
- Damsire: Troy
- Sex: Stallion
- Foaled: May 17, 1999
- Died: May 9, 2025 (aged 25)
- Country: United Kingdom
- Colour: Brown
- Breeder: Dayton Investments Ltd.
- Owner: Ecurie Wildenstein
- Trainer: Élie Lellouche
- Record: 28: 11-9-2
- Earnings: €1.541.235

Major wins
- Prix du Cadran (2003, 2004); Prix Royal-Oak (2003, 2004); Prix de la Porte de Madrid (2003); Prix de Barbeville (2003, 2005); Prix Gladiateur (2004); Prix Vicomtesse Vigier (2005); Ascot Gold Cup (2005)

Awards
- European Champion Stayer (2004, 2005)

Westerner (17 May 1999 — 9 May 2025) is a French-owned Champion Thoroughbred racehorse who competed successfully at racing venues across Europe. Bred by a Wildenstein family holding company, Westerner was raced by Alec Wildenstein. Trained by Élie Lellouche, in 2003 and 2004 in France he won back-to-back editions of the Group Ones Prix du Cadran and Prix Royal-Oak. His 2004 performances earned Westerner his first of two consecutive Cartier Racing Awards as Europe's top stayer.

In 2005, Westerner won the most important race of his career, the Ascot Gold Cup at York Racecourse in England. He went on to finish second to Hurricane Run in the October 2005 Prix de l'Arc de Triomphe at Longchamp Racecourse, and in December finished fifth in the final race of his career, the Hong Kong Vase at Shatin Racecourse.

Retired to stud duty for the 2006 season, Westerner stands at Castle Hyde Stud in Ireland as a National Hunt sire. In August 2009, his son, Times Square, gave him his first winner with a victory at La Teste-de-Buch.

Westerner was retired from stud duties in January 2025.
