= Prix de Barbeville =

Flat horse race in France

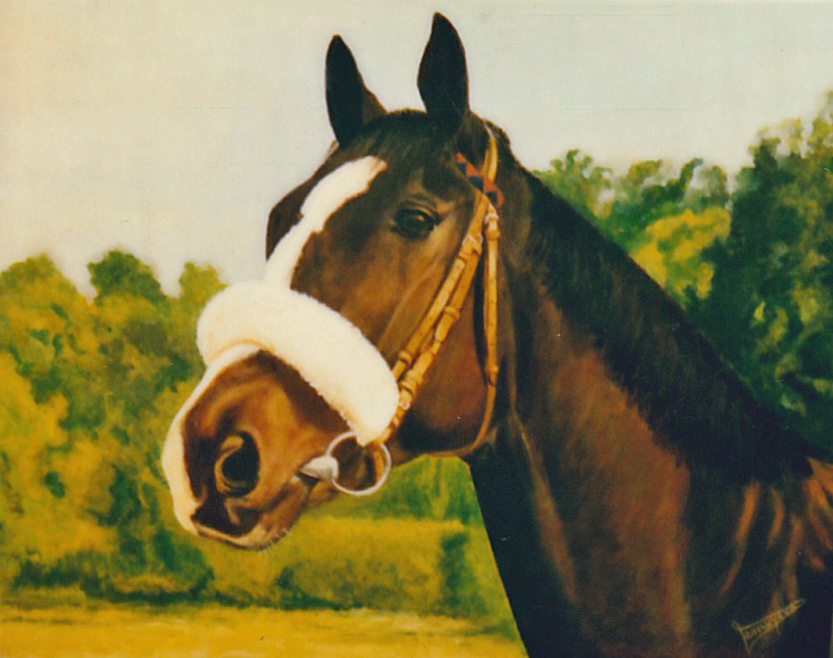
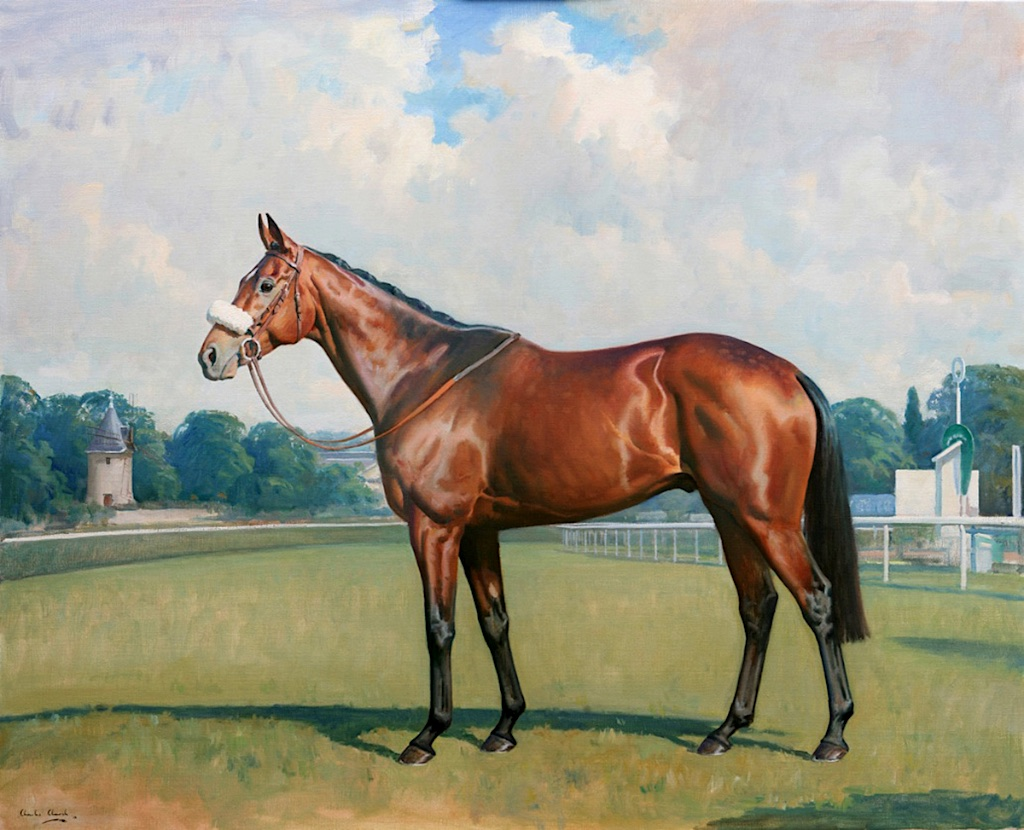
- Shafaraz, oil on canvas Painting by Bob Demuyser (1920–2003) Dunaden: 2011 winner, painted by Charles Church
- Class: Group 3
- Location: Longchamp Racecourse; Paris, France
- Inaugurated: 1889
- Race type: Flat / Thoroughbred
- Website: france-galop.com

Race information
- Distance: 3,100 metres (1m 7½f)
- Surface: Turf
- Track: Right-handed
- Qualification: Four-years-old and up
- Weight: 56½ kg (4y); 57½ kg (5y+); Allowances; 1½ kg for fillies and mares 1½ kg if no Listed win and no Group race 2nd or 3rd * Penalties; 3 kg for Group 1 winners * 2 kg for Group 2 winners * 1 kg for Group 3 winners * * since January 1 last year
- Purse: €80,000 (2019); 1st: €40,000

Prix de Barbeville
2025
Presage Nocturne	Internaute	Candelari

Previous years
2024
Sevenna's Knight	Shembala	Double Major
2023
Big Call	The Good Man	Moon Wolf
2022
The Good Man	Bubble Smart	Joie De Soir
2021
Skazino	Sheraz	Karlarina

2020-2011
2020
Call The Wind	Holdthasigreen	Libello
2019
Holdthasigreen	Way To Paris	Called To The Bar
2018
Funny Kid	Doha Dream	Ice Breeze
2017
Marmelo	Bateel	Travelling Man
2016
Fly With Me	Candarliya	Trip To Rhodos
2015
Alex My Boy	Fly With Me	Achtung
2014
Montclair	Terrubi	Fly With Me
2013
Last Train	Verema	Domeside
2012
Usuelo	Prairie Star	Tac De Boistron
2011
Dunaden	Mashoor	Kasbah Bliss

2010-2001
2010
Blek	Kasbah Bliss	Green Tango
2009
Pointilliste	La Boum	Faramir
2008
Coastal Path	Orion Star	Ponte Tresa
2007
Host Nation	Le Miracle	Ponte Tresa
2006
Petite Speciale	Lord Du Sud	Reefscape
2005
Westerner	Allez Olive	Gloirez
2004
Westerner	Forestier	Idaho Quest
2003
Morozov	Clety	L'Impatient
2002
Balthazar	Generic	Crillon
2001
Magna Graecia	Roli Abi	Le Tintoret

2000-1990
2000
Amilynx	Katun	Magnus
1999
Katun	Tajoun	Copeland
1998
Tajoun	Lucky Dream	Solo Mio
1997
Stretarez	Philanthrop	Heron Island
1996
Double Eclipse	Samiri	Helen Of Spain
1995
Nononito	The Little Thief	Always Earnest
1994
Pinot	Molesnes	Glanville
1993
Dadarissime	Sought Out	Turgeon
1992
Commendable	Last King	River Test
1991
Mardonius	Turgeon	Aelan Hapi
1990
Glacial Storm	Turgeon	Karmichah

The Prix de Barbeville is a Group 3 flat horse race in France open to thoroughbreds aged four years or older. It is run over a distance of 3,100 metres (about 1 mile and 7½ furlongs) at Longchamp in late April or early May.

== History ==
The event is named after Haras de Barbeville, a successful stud farm established in the late 19th century. It was first run in 1889, and was originally contested over 3,000 metres. It was initially restricted to horses aged five or older, and was opened to four-year-olds in 1905.

The race was abandoned throughout World War I, with no running from 1915 to 1919.

The Prix de Barbeville was held at Auteuil in 1943, Maisons-Laffitte in 1944, and Le Tremblay in 1945. It was shortened to 2,400 metres in 1953. It was run over 2,600 metres in 1956, and restored to 3,000 metres in 1957.

The race was contested at Saint-Cloud over 2,800 metres in 1963. It returned to Longchamp with a length of 3,100 metres in 1964. It was cut to 3,000 metres in 1965, and reverted to 3,100 metres in 1966.

The Prix de Barbeville was staged at Saint-Cloud over 2,900 metres in 1991. It was switched to Maisons-Laffitte with a distance of 3,100 metres in 1992. For the following three years it was run at Saint-Cloud over 2,900 metres (1993–94) and 3,100 metres (1995).

The event returned to Longchamp in 1996, and was initially contested over 3,000 metres. It was extended to 3,100 metres in 1997.

== Records ==
Most successful horse (2 wins):

- Presta – 1889, 1890
- Pardallo – 1968, 1969
- Recupere – 1974, 1975
- El Badr – 1979, 1982
- Denel – 1983, 1986
- Westerner – 2004, 2005

Leading jockey (5 wins):

- Yves Saint-Martin – Recupere (1974), Buckskin (1977), El Badr (1979), Denel (1983), Silver Green (1985)

Leading trainer (9 wins):

- André Fabre – Top Sunrise (1989), Mardonius (1991), Amilynx (2000), Morozov (2003), Host Nation (2007), Coastal Path (2008), Last Train (2013), Montclair (2014), Sevenna's Knight (2024)

Leading owner (5 wins):

- Guy de Rothschild – Celadon (1964), White Label (1965), Alyscamps (1966), Arlequino (1972), Filandre (1973)

== Winners since 1974 ==
Year	Winner	Age	Jockey	Trainer	Owner	Time
1974	Recupere	4	Yves Saint-Martin	Gilles Delloye	Alan Clore	3:35.70
1975	Recupere	5	Bill Pyers	Gilles Delloye	Alan Clore
1976	Sagaro	5	Philippe Paquet	François Boutin	Gerry Oldham	3:33.10
1977	Buckskin	4	Yves Saint-Martin	Angel Penna	Daniel Wildenstein
1978	Shafaraz	5	Maurice Philipperon	Pierre Biancone	Yurk Skalka	3:42.90
1979	El Badr	4	Yves Saint-Martin	Mitri Saliba	Mahmoud Fustok	3:55.10
1980	Hard to Sing	4	Georges Doleuze	Charlie Milbank	N. Lathom-Sharp
1981	Kelbomec	5	Jean-Claude Desaint	J. C. Cunnington	Mrs Jacques Barker	3:30.90
1982	El Badr	7	Alfred Gibert	Mitri Saliba	Mahmoud Fustok	3:35.20
1983	Denel	4	Yves Saint-Martin	Bernard Secly	Mrs Salomon Nathan	3:54.40
1984	Marasali	6	Alain Lequeux	J. C. Cunnington	Serge Fradkoff	3:44.30
1985	Silver Green	4	Yves Saint-Martin	Alain de Royer-Dupré	Marquesa de Moratalla	3:47.80
1986	Denel	7	Cash Asmussen	Pascal Bary	Mrs Salomon Nathan	3:35.10
1987	Farid	4	Cash Asmussen	Jacques de Chevigny	Paul Gouyou	3:25.80
1988	Royal Gait	5	Alfred Gibert	John Fellows	Manuel Pereira-Arias	3:38.50
1989	Top Sunrise	4	Cash Asmussen	André Fabre	Charles Schmidt	3:37.50
1990	Glacial Storm	5	Cash Asmussen	John Hammond	Cheveley Park Stud	3:32.20
1991	Mardonius	5	Thierry Jarnet	André Fabre	Sheikh Mohammed	3:07.10
1992	Commendable	4	Joel Boisnard	Henri-Alex Pantall	Khalid Abdullah	3:20.40
1993	Dadarissime	4	Freddy Head	Georges Bridgland	Sir James Goldsmith	3:19.10
1994	Pinot	4	Guy Guignard	Bruno Schütz	Stall Hoppegarten	3:11.80
1995	Nononito	4	Gérald Mossé	Jean Lesbordes	Patrick Sebagh	3:49.00
1996	Double Eclipse	4	Jason Weaver	Mark Johnston	Middleham Partnership	3:06.60
1997	Stretarez	4	Frédéric Sanchez	Dominique Sépulchre	Jean-Luc Lagardère	3:24.80
1998	Tajoun	4	Gérald Mossé	Alain de Royer-Dupré	HH Aga Khan IV	3:34.70
1999	Katun	6	Thierry Thulliez	Xavier Nakkachdji	Antoine Boucher	3:23.50
2000	Amilynx	4	Olivier Peslier	André Fabre	Jean-Luc Lagardère	3:40.20
2001	Magna Graecia	4	Thierry Thulliez	Henri-Alex Pantall	Sheikh Mohammed	3:39.30
2002	Balthazar	4	Davy Bonilla	Alain Lyon	Mrs Jacques Bouchara	3:29.80
2003	Morozov	4	Christophe Soumillon	André Fabre	Sheikh Mohammed	3:28.00
2004	Westerner	5	Dominique Boeuf	Élie Lellouche	Ecurie Wildenstein	3:35.50
2005	Westerner	6	Olivier Peslier	Élie Lellouche	Ecurie Wildenstein	3:29.40
2006	Petite Speciale	7	Christophe Lemaire	Eric Lecoiffier	Jean-Pierre Leseigneur	3:24.60
2007	Host Nation	4	Stéphane Pasquier	André Fabre	Khalid Abdullah	3:21.50
2008	Coastal Path	4	Stéphane Pasquier	André Fabre	Khalid Abdullah	3:17.80
2009	Pointilliste	6	Anthony Crastus	Élie Lellouche	Ecurie Wildenstein	3:21.04
2010	Blek	5	Anthony Crastus	Élie Lellouche	Alain Maubert	3:22.50
2011	Dunaden	5	Grégory Benoist	Mikel Delzangles	Pearl Bloodstock Ltd	3:21.47
2012	Usuelo	4	Antoine Hamelin	Jean-Luc Guillochon	Jean-Luc Guillochon	3:42.20
2013	Last Train	4	Maxime Guyon	André Fabre	Khalid Abdullah	3:30.44
2014	Montclair	4	Pierre-Charles Boudot	André Fabre	Oti / Watt	3:37.44
2015	Alex My Boy	4	Olivier Peslier	Andreas Wohler	Jaber Abdullah	3:31.43
2016	Fly With Me (Note: The 2016 and 2017 races took place at Chantilly while Longchamp was closed for redevelopment)	6	Maxime Guyon	Eric Libaud	Ecurie Luck	3:18.13
2017	Marmelo	4	Christophe Soumillon	Hughie Morrison	The Fairy Story Partnership	3:06.89
2018	Funny Kid	5	Maxime Guyon	Christophe Ferland	Wertheimer et Frère	3:21.62
2019	Holdthasigreen	7	Tony Piccone	Bruno Audoin	Jean Gilbert	3:22.41
2020	Call The Wind	6	Olivier Peslier	Freddy Head	George W. Strawbridge Jr.	3:21.79
2021	Skazino	5	Mickael Barzalona	Cedric Ross	Le Haras De La Gousserie	3:19.50
2022	The Good Man	5	Theo Bachelot	Stephane Wattel	Capt Adrian Pratt, S Wattel Et Al	3:16.70
2023	Big Call	6	Stéphane Pasquier	Christophe Ferland	Christophe Ferland & Flora Scott	3:25.73
2024	Sevenna's Knight	4	Mickael Barzalona	André Fabre	Oti Management Pty Ltd	3:12.97
2025	Presage Nocturne	5	Stéphane Pasquier	Alessandro & Giuseppe Botti	Paolo Zambelli, Carlo Pellegatti et al	3:18.95
2026	Asmarani	4	Mickael Barzalona	Francis-Henri Graffard	Aga Khan Studs SCEA	3:21.03

== Earlier winners ==
- 1889: Presta
- 1890: Presta
- 1891: Carmaux
- 1892: Dacis
- 1893: Fitz Roya
- 1894: Acoli
- 1895: Moulinois
- 1896: Blandy
- 1897: Vigoureux
- 1898: Kerym
- 1899: Longbow
- 1900: Melina
- 1901: Ismene
- 1902: Clisiade
- 1903: Passaro
- 1904: Abydos
- 1905: Parfait
- 1906: Marsan
- 1907: Ixia
- 1908: Ingenu
- 1909: Val Suzon
- 1910: Chamoerops
- 1911: Le Tocsin
- 1912: Mereville
- 1913: Hardie
- 1914: Bavard
- 1915–19: no race
- 1920: Guido Reni
- 1921: Lord Frey
- 1922: Macfarlane
- 1923: Nonchaloir
- 1924: Balaam
- 1925: Le Gueliz
- 1926: Petit Frere
- 1927: Juveilin
- 1928: Bouillabaisse
- 1929: Erodion
- 1930: Picaflor
- 1931: Taraval
- 1932: Taxodium
- 1933: Majordome
- 1934: Convenio
- 1935: Folle Passion
- 1936: Arkina
- 1937: Schamil
- 1938: Le Chari
- 1939: Lament
- 1940: Belle Etoile
- 1941: Babouino
- 1942: Rouge et Noir
- 1943: Merigo
- 1944: Blue Mill
- 1945: Woodcutter
- 1946:
- 1947: Diable Gris
- 1948: Triolet
- 1949: Rhode Islander
- 1950:
- 1951: Coast Guard
- 1952: Satinette
- 1953: Sari
- 1954: Seriphos
- 1955: Mahan
- 1956:
- 1957: Flying Flag
- 1958: Clichy
- 1959: Hope or Joke
- 1960: Sheshoon
- 1961: Toukaram
- 1962: Gisors
- 1963: Taine
- 1964: Celadon
- 1965: White Label
- 1966: Alyscamps
- 1967: Waylay
- 1968: Pardallo
- 1969: Pardallo
- 1970: In the Purple
- 1971: Ramsin
- 1972: Arlequino
- 1973: Filandre

== See also ==
- List of French flat horse races
