= Lloyd Klein =

French couturier (born 1967)

- Born: Lloyd David Klein; 1967; Montréal, Quebec, Canada
- Labels: Lloyd Klein Couture; LKLA
- Website: lloydklein.com

Lloyd David Klein is a French couturier born 15 February 1967 in Canada. His fashion label is Lloyd Klein Couture.

== Career ==
Klein was born in Montreal, Quebec, Canada, to French parents and was raised in Paris, France. He studied architecture at the École Nationale Supérieure des Arts Décoratifs, and worked in an architect's practice in New York. He returned to Paris and switched to studying fashion after seeing a Givenchy runway show; he presented a prêt-à-porter collection in October 1987. Klein's first runway show was at the Opéra-Comique de Paris in 1994. Not long after, he was appointed head designer for the house of Grès. He then started his own label. In 1998 he moved his business to the United States.

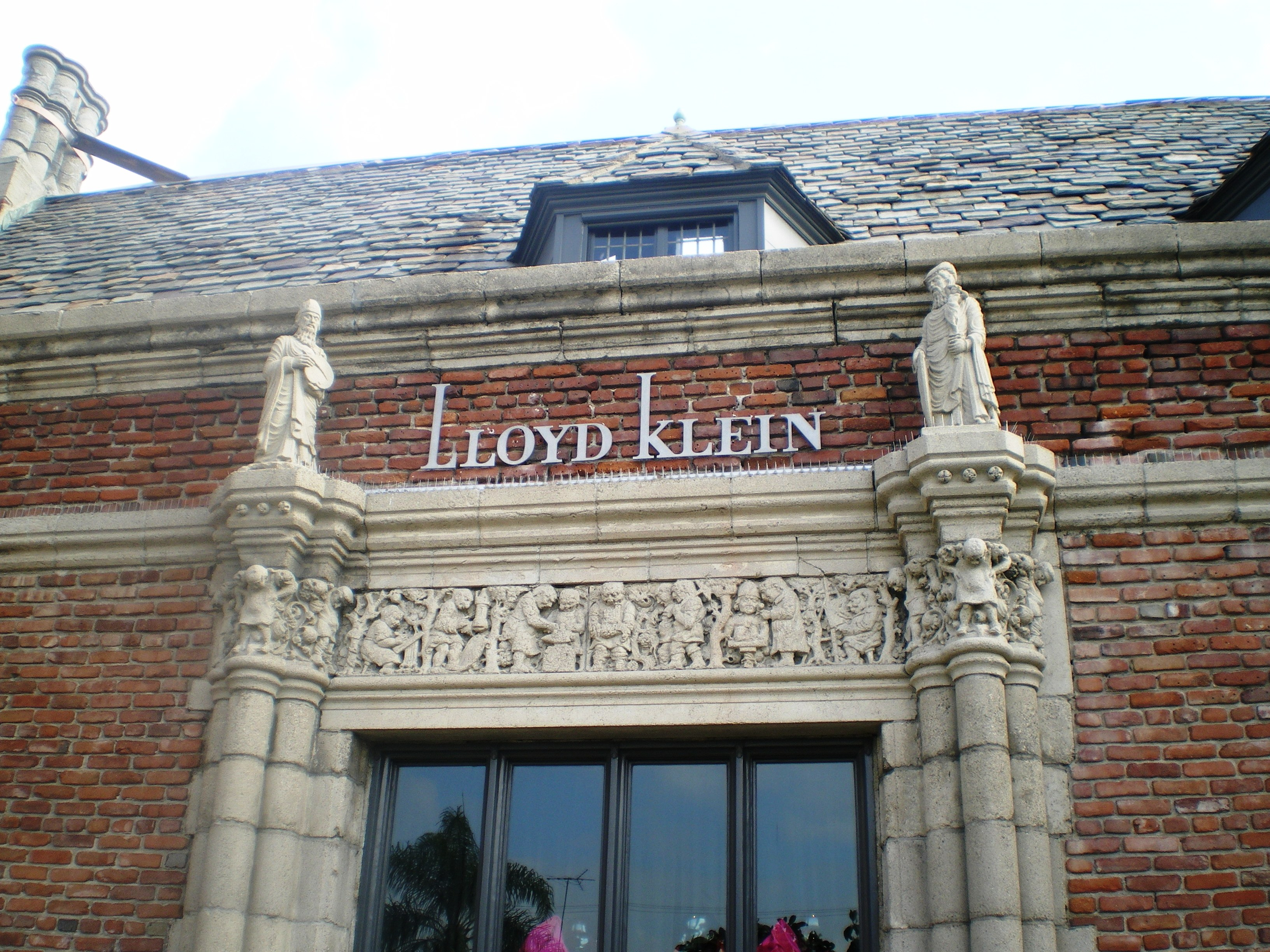

He opened premises in the Heinsbergen Decorating Company Building on Beverly Boulevard.

In 2012 Klein started marketing sportswear for men and women under the label LKLA. In August 2013 a collaboration between Klein and eyewear manufacturer Ivory Mason was announced.

Among those who have worn clothes designed by Klein are: Natalie Cole, Paula Abdul, Tara Reid, Marissa Miller, Dita von Teese, Brandy Norwood (in "It All Belongs To Me") and Nicki Minaj (in "Your Love").

== Life ==
In February 2004 Klein was badly injured in a car crash outside Paris, and was in a coma for two days. His planned runway show at the New York Fashion Week was cancelled as a result.
