= Sagaro =

Irish-bred, Thoroughbred racehorse (1971–1986)

- Sire: Espresso
- Grandsire: Acropolis
- Dam: Zambara
- Damsire: Mossborough
- Sex: Stallion
- Foaled: 1971
- Country: Ireland
- Colour: Chestnut
- Breeder: Citadel Stud Establishment
- Owner: Gerald A. Oldham (Racing silks: Chocolate & white hoops, white cap)
- Trainer: François Boutin
- Record: 24: 10-5-2
- Earnings: £270,780

Major wins
- Ascot Gold Cup (1975, 1976, 1977); Grand Prix de Paris (1974); Prix de Barbeville (1976); Prix du Cadran (1976)

Awards
- Timeform rating: 133

Honours
- Sagaro Stakes at Ascot Racecourse
- Last updated on 20 June 2025

Sagaro (1971–1986) was an Irish-bred, French-trained thoroughbred racehorse. He is regarded as one of the best stayers ever in Europe on the Flat.

== Background ==
Sagaro was a chestnut horse bred by his owner Gerald Oldham, the Geneva-based financier and owner of Citadel Stud, Co Kildare. His sire Espresso, a half brother to the leading Australasian sire King of Babylon, won ten races including the Newbury Summer Cup, Vaux Gold Tankard and the Grosser Preis von Baden twice. He was also fourth in the Washington International. Sagaro's dam was half-sister to Mr Oldham's Chicago who won the Henry II Stakes at Sandown and Cumberland Lodge Stakes at Ascot.

== Racing career ==
Sagaro was trained at Lamorlaye in France by François Boutin. He won in every season from 1973 to 1977. As a two year old he ran three times winning once over 8.5 furlongs on good ground.

=== 1974: three-year-old season ===
In 1974 as a three-year-old Sagaro won four races from 12 furlongs to just short of two miles. His campaign started with a win over 12 furlongs on good ground in the Prix Canot at Saint-Cloud. On April 21 he finished 4th over 10 furlongs plus on good ground in the Prix Daru at Longchamp, ridden by Lester Piggott.Sagaro then won the Prix Lovelace at Maisons-Laffitte again over 12 furlongs. The next race was the 1 mile 7 furlong Prix de Esperance against 6 rivals which he won by 2 and 1/2 lengths on yielding ground again ridden by Lester Piggott. Sagaro "won as his jockey pleased" according to Timeform.

Sagaro's first major success came in the Grand Prix de Paris over nearly 2 miles on Sunday 30 June 1974 at Longchamp. He won on soft ground in a field of 18 by two lengths "hands down" from Bustino Timeform Racehorses of 1974 said "Two furlongs out Sagaro moved through smoothly and strongly on the outside; in a few strides the whole complexion of the race changed.. it was all over" Lester Piggott his regular jockey said of the performance "he won in great style" and "Sagaro had much more speed than the average stayer and no matter how long the race could produce a dazzling turn of foot in the closing stages". Sagaro was rated 131 in 1974 by Timeform who concluded he was "a very good stayer". Sagaro completed his 3yo season by dropping back to a mile and a half running second in the Prix Niel before finishing unplaced behind Allez France in the Prix de l'Arc de Triomphe.

=== 1975–1977 ===
In 1975 he won his first Ascot Gold Cup, his only win from six starts that year. In his second race, the Prix Du Cadran in May, he was second to Le Bavard, having been set too much to do and not being quite fully fit according to his trainer. In the Ascot Gold Cup, the placings were reversed with Sagaro a four-length winner, which Timeform believed could have been double that had his jockey wished. Sagaro was settled easily and travelling much the best before settling the matter in a few strides inside the final furlong. His form was not as good in subsequent races at shorter distances and an injury at Deauville in August ruled him out for the rest of the season.

The following season, he won the Prix de Barbeville and the Prix du Cadran in France before returning to Ascot to win a second Ascot Gold Cup by a length from Crash Course. ″Purring ahead with the restrained power of a murmuring Rolls-Royce in mass production traffic, Sagaro inched away from Crash Course to stroll over the line unextended, with a length advantage″. Timeform wrote "Sagaro was emphatically the best of a vintage collection of out and out stayers in 1976". They gave him a rating of 129.

In 1977 he won his third consecutive Ascot Gold Cup, which at that time was a record. In his autobiography, English champion jockey Lester Piggott, who rode Sagaro in all his major races, described him as "the greatest long-distance horse I ever rode".

== Stud record ==
Sagaro retired to The National Stud in England in 1977 and died in 1986.

Gerald Oldham said of him "He was a marvellous racehorse and one of the greatest stayers. It was just as much of a thrill to have bred him as to have raced him. Champions like him don't come along often."
