= Prix du Cadran =

Flat horse race in France

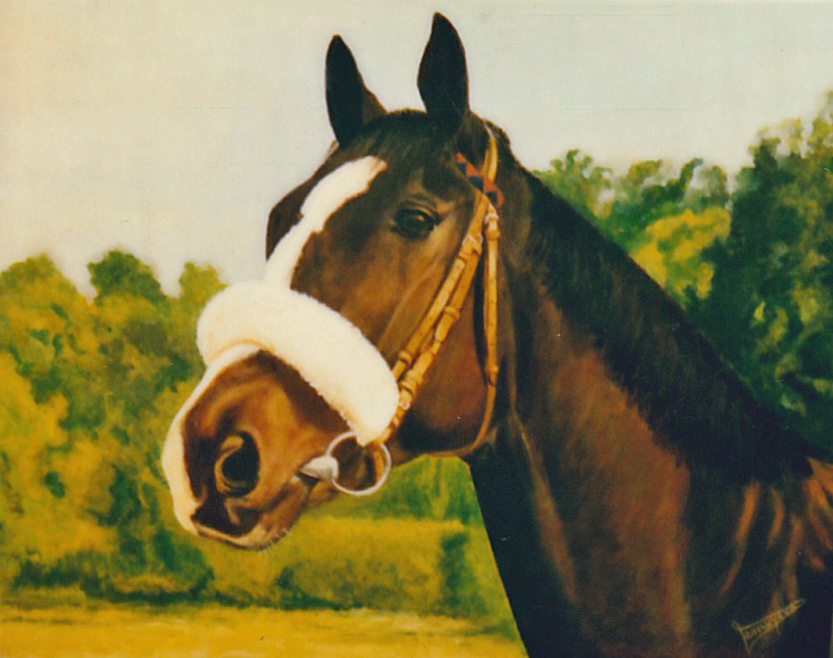
- Shafaraz, oil on canvas Painting by Bob Demuyser (1920–2003)
- Class: Group 1
- Location: Longchamp Racecourse; Paris, France
- Inaugurated: 1837
- Race type: Flat / Thoroughbred
- Sponsor: Qatar
- Website: france-galop.com

Race information
- Distance: 4,000 metres (2½ miles)
- Surface: Turf
- Track: Right-handed
- Qualification: Four-years-old and up
- Weight: 58 kg Allowances; 1½ kg for fillies and mares
- Purse: €300,000 (2021); 1st: €171,420

Prix du Cadran
2026
Caballo De Mar	Scandinavia	Queenstown

Previous years
2025
Caballo De Mar	Coltrane	Queenstown
2024
Kyprios	Trueshan	Coltrane
2023
Trueshan	Moon Wolf	Run For Oscar
2022
Kyprios	Almacado Gree	Tashkhan
2021
Trueshan	Stradivarius	Bubble Smart

2020-2011
2020
Princess Zoe	Alkuin	Call The Wind
2019
Holdthasigreen	Call The Wind	Dee Ex Bee
2018
Call The Wind	Holdthasigreen	Morgan Le Faye
2017
Vazirabad	Mille Et Mille	Trip To Rhodos
2016
Quest For More	Vazirabad	Nearly Caught
2015
Mille Et Mille	Kicky Blue	Fun Mac
2014
High Jinx	Bathyrhon	Pale Mimosa
2013
Altano	Tac De Boistron	Times Up
2012
Molly Malone	High Jinx	Colour Vision
2011
Kasbah Bliss	Tres Rock Danon	Brigantin

2010–2001
2010
Gentoo	Winter Dream	Kasbah Bliss
2009
Alandi	Kasbah Bliss	Yeats
2008
Bannaby	Incanto Dream	Orion Star
2007
Le Miracle	Varevees	Yeats
2006
Sergeant Cecil	Shamdala	Le Miracle
2005
Reefscape	Alcazar	Ostankino
2004
Westerner	Cut Quartz	Le Carre
2003
Westerner	Germinis	Darasim
2002
Give Notice	Pushkin	Cut Quartz
2001
Germinis	Generic	San Sebastian

2000–1992
2000
San Sebastian	Persian Punch	Royal Rebel
1999
Tajoun	San Sebastian	Divination
1998
Invermark	Tiraaz	San Sebastian
1997
Chief Contender	Celeric	Persian Punch
1996
Nononito	Moonax	Always Earnest
1995
Always Earnest	Moonax	Nononito
1994
Molesnes	Always Earnest	Safety In Numbers
1993
Assessor	Sought Out	Sonus
1992
Sought Out	Drum Taps	Dariyoun

The Prix du Cadran is a Group 1 flat horse race in France open to thoroughbreds aged four years or older. It is run at Longchamp over a distance of 4,000 metres (about 2 1/2 miles), and it is scheduled to take place each year in early October.

It is France's most prestigious race for "stayers" – horses which specialise in racing over long distances. It is the French equivalent of the Gold Cup, the leading stayers' race in Great Britain.

== History ==
The event is named after a clock face (cadran) at the École Militaire, a building located alongside its original venue, the Champ de Mars. It was first run in 1837, and was initially contested over one and a quarter laps of the track, about 2,500 metres.

The race was extended to 4,000 metres in 1843, and increased to 4,200 metres in 1846. It was held at Versailles in 1848, due to that year's French Revolution. It was not run in 1850, and its distance changed several times in the following decade. It was restricted to four-year-olds in 1854. It was transferred to Longchamp in 1857, and reverted to 4,200 metres in 1858. It was cancelled in 1871, because of the Franco-Prussian War.

The Prix du Cadran was re-opened to horses aged five or older and cut to 4,000 metres in 1913. It was abandoned throughout World War I, with no running from 1915 to 1918. It was cancelled once during World War II, in 1940. It was staged at Le Tremblay over 4,100 metres from 1943 to 1945. It was abandoned because of student protests in 1968.

The present system of race grading was introduced in 1971, and the Prix du Cadran was classed at the highest level, Group 1. For a period it took place in late May. It was opened to geldings in 1986.

The race was moved to the Saturday of Prix de l'Arc de Triomphe weekend in 1991. It was later switched to the same day as the "Arc", usually the first Sunday in October.

== Records ==
Most successful horse (4 wins):

- Marsyas – 1944, 1945, 1946, 1947

Leading jockey (5 wins):

- Yves Saint-Martin – Waldmeister (1965), Danseur (1967), Recupere (1974), Buckskin (1977, 1978)

Leading trainer (15 wins):

- Tom Jennings – La Cloture (1851), Hervine (1852), Papillon (1854), Monarque (1856), Compiegne (1862), Alerte (1863), Beatrix (1865), La Fortune (1866), Auguste (1867), Longchamps (1868), Le Sarrazin (1869), Boulogne (1870), Saint Christophe (1878), Rayon d'Or (1880), Milan (1881)

(note: the trainers of some of the early winners are unknown)

Leading owner (11 wins):

- Frédéric de Lagrange – Compiegne (1862), Alerte (1863), Beatrix (1865), La Fortune (1866), Auguste (1867), Longchamps (1868), Le Sarrazin (1869), Boulogne (1870), Saint Christophe (1878), Rayon d'Or (1880), Milan (1881)

== Winners since 1969 ==
Year	Winner	Age	Jockey	Trainer	Owner	Time
1969	Levmoss	4	Bill Williamson	Seamus McGrath	Seamus McGrath	4:42.70
1970	Le Chouan	4	Bill Pyers	Maurice Zilber	Daniel Wildenstein	4:28.70
1971	Ramsin	4	Henri Samani	Geoffroy Watson	Thierry van Zuylen	4:49.00
1972	Rock Roi	5	Duncan Keith	Peter Walwyn	Roger Hue-Williams	4:30.60
1973	Lassalle	4	Jimmy Lindley	Richard Carver Jr.	Zenya Yoshida	4:40.50
1974	Recupere	4	Yves Saint-Martin	Gilles Delloye	Alan Clore	4:40.50
1975	Le Bavard	4	Alfred Gibert	Max Bonaventure	Henry Aubert	4:40.00
1976	Sagaro	5	Philippe Paquet	François Boutin	Gerry Oldham	4:20.90
1977	Buckskin	4	Yves Saint-Martin	Angel Penna	Daniel Wildenstein	4:36.00
1978	Buckskin	5	Yves Saint-Martin	Peter Walwyn	Daniel Wildenstein	4:38.10
1979	El Badr	4	Henri Samani	Mitri Saliba	Mahmoud Fustok	4:17.30
1980	Shafaraz	7	Maurice Philipperon	Pierre Biancone	Yurk Skalka	4:17.40
1981	Gold River	4	Freddy Head	Alec Head	Jacques Wertheimer	4:38.00
1982	El Badr	7	Alfred Gibert	Mitri Saliba	Mahmoud Fustok	5:19.10
1983	Karkour	5	Freddy Head	Joseph Audon	Ecurie Manhattan	4:49.60
1984	Neustrien	5	Éric Legrix	Patrick Biancone	Naji Pharaon	4:45.50
1985	Balitou	6	Éric Legrix	Patrick Biancone	Daniel Wildenstein	4:17.90
1986	Air de Cour	4	Éric Legrix	Patrick Biancone	Daniel Wildenstein	4:21.10
1987	Royal Gait	4	Olindo Mongelluzzo	Gerardo Villarta	Manuel Pereira-Arias	4:28.90
1988	Yaka	5	Cash Asmussen	Alain Chelet	Mrs Arthur Dewez	4:34.00
1989	Trebrook	5	Éric Legrix	Jean Lesbordes	Georges Blizniansky	4:23.10
1990	Mercalle	4	Maurice Bouland	Maurice Bouland	Raymond Le Poder	4:19.20
1991	Victoire Bleue	4	Thierry Jarnet	André Fabre	Daniel Wildenstein	4:27.00
1992	Sought Out	4	Cash Asmussen	John Hammond	Lord Weinstock	4:41.10
1993	Assessor	4	John Reid	Richard Hannon Sr.	Bjorn Nielsen	4:38.20
1994	Molesnes	4	Olivier Peslier	Marcel Rolland	Mitaab bin Abdullah	4:27.50
1995	Always Earnest	7	Alain Badel	Myriam Bollack-Badel	Mrs Claude Bourg	4:36.50
1996	Nononito	5	Thierry Jarnet	Jean Lesbordes	Patrick Sebagh	4:31.50
1997	Chief Contender	4	Olivier Doleuze	Peter Chapple-Hyam	Sue Magnier	4:16.40
1998	Invermark	4	Richard Hughes	James Fanshawe	Sir David Wills	4:47.80
1999	Tajoun	5	Gérald Mossé	Alain de Royer-Dupré	HH Aga Khan IV	4:51.80
2000	San Sebastian	6	Davy Bonilla	John Dunlop	Mrs Michael Watt	4:14.10
2001	Germinis	7	Renaud Janneau	Patrice Chevillard	Robert Sallet	4:46.30
2002	Give Notice	5	Johnny Murtagh	John Dunlop	Stewart-Brown / Meacock	4:23.80
2003	Westerner	4	Dominique Boeuf	Élie Lellouche	Ecurie Wildenstein	4:37.50
2004	Westerner	5	Olivier Peslier	Élie Lellouche	Ecurie Wildenstein	4:19.80
2005	Reefscape	4	Christophe Soumillon	André Fabre	Khalid Abdullah	4:36.00
2006	Sergeant Cecil	7	Frankie Dettori	Rod Millman	Terry Cooper	4:20.90
2007	Le Miracle	6	Dominique Boeuf	Werner Baltromei	R'stall Gestüt Hachtsee	4:29.80
2008	Bannaby	5	Christophe Soumillon	M. Delcher Sánchez	Cuadra Miranda SL	4:22.20
2009	Alandi	4	Michael Kinane	John Oxx	HH Aga Khan IV	4:12.70
2010	Gentoo	6	Gérald Mossé	Alain Lyon	Serge Tripier-Mondancin	4:40.80
2011	Kasbah Bliss	9	Gérald Mossé	François Doumen	Henri de Pracomtal	4:30.52
2012	Molly Malone	4	Umberto Rispoli	Mikel Delzangles	Dieter Bürkle	4:43.60
2013	Altano	7	Eduardo Pedroza	Andreas Wohler	Frau Dr I Hornig	4:24.38
2014	High Jinx	6	Ryan Moore	James Fanshawe	Mr & Mrs W. J. Williams	4:12.22
2015	Mille Et Mille	5	Thierry Thulliez	Carlos Lerner	Nicolas Saltiel	4:22.61
2016	Quest For More (Note: The 2016 and 2017 races took place at Chantilly while Longchamp was closed for redevelopment)	6	George Baker	Roger Charlton	Sultan Ahmad Shah	4:23.57
2017	Vazirabad	5	Christophe Soumillon	Alain de Royer-Dupré	HH Aga Khan IV	4:34.60
2018	Call The Wind	4	Aurelien Lemaitre	Freddy Head	George Strawbridge	4:24.41
2019	Holdthasigreen	7	Tony Piccone	Bruno Audouin	Jean Gilbert & Claude Le Lay	4:41.83
2020	Princess Zoe	5	Joey Sheridan	Anthony Mullins	Patrick Kehoe & Mrs P Crampton	4:38.88
2021	Trueshan	5	James Doyle	Alan King	Singula Partnership	4:28.10
2022	Kyprios	4	Ryan Moore	Aidan O'Brien	Moyglare Stud / Smith / Magnier / Tabor	4:31.62
2023	Trueshan	7	Hollie Doyle	Alan King	Singula Partnership	4:19.52
2024	Kyprios	6	Ryan Moore	Aidan O'Brien	Moyglare Stud / Smith / Magnier / Tabor	4:25.36
2025	Caballo De Mar	4	Tom Marquand	George Scott	Victorious Forever	4:34.74
2026	Caballo De Mar	5	Oisin Murphy	George Scott	Victorious Forever	4:18.94

== Earlier winners ==
- 1837: Miss Annette
- 1838: Franck
- 1839: Nautilus
- 1840: Nautilus
- 1841: Deception
- 1842: Nautilus
- 1843: Annetta
- 1844: Nativa
- 1845: Edwin
- 1846: Tomate
- 1847: Liverpool
- 1848: Morok
- 1849: Nanetta
- 1850: no race
- 1851: La Cloture
- 1852: Hervine
- 1853: Trust
- 1854: Papillon
- 1855: Remuneration
- 1856: Monarque
- 1857: Nat
- 1858: Potocki
- 1859: Martel en Tete
- 1860: Geologie
- 1861: Pretendant
- 1862: Compiegne
- 1863: Alerte
- 1864: Guillaume le Taciturne
- 1865: Beatrix
- 1866: La Fortune
- 1867: Auguste
- 1868: Longchamps
- 1869: Le Sarrazin
- 1870: Boulogne
- 1871: no race
- 1872: Veranda
- 1873: Revigny
- 1874: Boiard
- 1875: Saltarelle
- 1876: Saint Cyr
- 1877: Enguerrande
- 1878: Saint Christophe
- 1879: Clocher
- 1880: Rayon d'Or
- 1881: Milan
- 1882: Bariolet
- 1883: Seigneur
- 1884: Regain
- 1885: Archiduc
- 1886: Lapin
- 1887: Sauterelle
- 1888: Krakatoa
- 1889: Siberie
- 1890: Clover
- 1891: Mirabeau
- 1892: Berenger
- 1893: Chene Royal
- 1894: Fousi Yama
- 1895: Excuse
- 1896: Omnium II
- 1897: Olmutz
- 1898: Chambertin
- 1899: Le Roi Soleil
- 1900: Perth
- 1901: Ivoire
- 1902: La Camargo
- 1903: Astronome
- 1904: Camisole
- 1905: Gouvernant
- 1906: Strozzi
- 1907: Ris Orangis
- 1908: Kalisz
- 1909: Sauge Pourpree
- 1910: Aveu
- 1911: La Francaise
- 1912: Combourg
- 1913: Predicateur
- 1914: Nimbus
- 1915–18: no race
- 1919: Bridaine
- 1920: Samourai
- 1921: Odol
- 1922: Ksar
- 1923: Le Prodige
- 1924: Filibert de Savoie
- 1925: Cadum
- 1926: Priori
- 1927: Asteroide
- 1928: Nino
- 1929: Cacao
- 1930: Hotweed
- 1931: Chateau Bouscaut
- 1932: Brulette
- 1933: Gris Perle
- 1934: Thor
- 1935: Brantôme
- 1936: Chaudiere
- 1937: Fantastic
- 1938: Dadji
- 1939: Foxlight
- 1940: no race
- 1941: Maurepas
- 1942: Nepenthe
- 1943: Hern the Hunter
- 1944: Marsyas
- 1945: Marsyas
- 1946: Marsyas
- 1947: Marsyas
- 1948: Arbar
- 1949: Turmoil
- 1950: Ciel Etoile
- 1951: Ysard
- 1952: Mat de Cocagne
- 1953: Feu du Diable *
- 1954: Silex
- 1955: Elpenor
- 1956: Bewitched
- 1957: Cambremer
- 1958: Scot
- 1959: Tello
- 1960: Le Loup Garou
- 1961: Puissant Chef
- 1962: Taine
- 1963: Taine
- 1964: Azincourt
- 1965: Waldmeister
- 1966: Fantomas
- 1967: Danseur
- 1968: no race

* Vamos finished first in 1953, but he was disqualified.

== See also ==
- List of French flat horse races
