= Alec N. Wildenstein =

American billionaire (1940–2008)

Alec Wildenstein
- Born: Alec Nathan Marcel Wildenstein; 5 August 1940; Marseille, Bouches-du-Rhône, France
- Died: 18 February 2008 (aged 67); Paris, France
- Occupations: Art dealer, racehorse owner and breeder
- Spouses: Jocelyne Périsset (m. 1978; div. 1999) Liouba Stoupakova (m. 2000)
- Children: 2
- Parent: Daniel Wildenstein (father)
- Relatives: Guy Wildenstein (brother)

Alec Nathan Marcel Wildenstein (5 August 1940 – 18 February 2008) was an American billionaire businessman, art dealer, racehorse owner, and horse breeder.

== Biography ==
Born in Marseille to Daniel and Martine Julie (Kapferer) Wildenstein, the daughter of art collector Marcel Kapferer, Alec Wildenstein was raised in New York City where his family owned and operated an art gallery. In 1875, his great-grandfather founded a business dealing in art. His father, Daniel Wildenstein, was a distinguished scholar of impressionism. Upon his father's death in 2001, Alec Wildenstein inherited half of his father's business empire estimated at US$10 billion and included what was believed to be the world's largest private collection of major works of art.

== Horse racing ==
Wildenstein enjoyed thoroughbreds for flat and steeplechase and standardbreds for harness racing. His Ecurie Wildenstein racing stable hired Élie Lellouche and Dominique Sepulchre to train his flat horses, and Jean-Paul Gallorini and Marcel Rolland for his steeplechase runners. Wildenstein raced a number of successful horses including:

- Bright Sky – won the Prix de Diane, Prix de l'Opéra
- Aquarelliste – won Prix Vermeille, Prix de Diane, Prix Ganay
- Westerner – won Ascot Gold Cup, Prix du Cadran, Prix Royal-Oak, 2004 & 2005 European Champion Stayer
- Vallée Enchantée – won the Hong Kong Vase

In 2004, Wildenstein's steeplechase runner, Kotkijet, owned in partnership with Jean-Pierre Dubois, won his second Grand Steeple-Chase de Paris.

== Personal life ==
In 1977, his family purchased a 49% stake for Wildenstein in the first 66,000-acre (27,000-hectare) Ol Jogi Ranch on the Laikipia District in Kenya. In 1985, the family acquired complete ownership. He met Jocelyne Périsset when she was a guest at Ol Jogi Ranch and they were married on 30 April 1978 in Las Vegas, Nevada. They had a daughter, Diane, followed by a son, Alec Jr. Their divorce proceedings between 1997 and 1999 gained wide media coverage for revelations about the couple's extravagant spending habits and the pressure he put on Jocelyne Wildenstein to undergo plastic surgery. In 2000, he married Russian-born model Liouba Stoupakova, who survived him.
