= Frédéric Lagrange =

Frédéric Lagrange may refer to:

- Frédéric Lagrange (politician) (1815–1883), French politician and racehorse owner
- Frédéric Lagrange (photographer), French travel and fashion photographer
