= Special Tiara =

British-bred Thoroughbred racehorse

- Racing silks of David Young and Sally Rowley-Williams
- Sire: Kayf Tara
- Grandsire: Sadler's Wells
- Dam: Special Choice
- Damsire: Bob Back
- Sex: Gelding
- Foaled: 31 March 2007
- Died: 2 February 2019 (aged 11)
- Country: United Kingdom
- Colour: Bay
- Breeder: David Young
- Owner: David Young; Sally Rowley-Williams
- Trainer: Henry de Bromhead
- Record: 37: 7-6-11
- Earnings: £672,025

Major wins
- Maghull Novices' Chase (2013); Desert Orchid Chase (2014, 2016); Celebration Chase (2015); Queen Mother Champion Chase (2017)

Special Tiara (31 March 2007 – 2 February 2019) was a British-bred, Irish-trained Thoroughbred racehorse who competed in National Hunt races. He specialised in steeplechases over the minimum distance of two miles and was a confirmed front-runner who usually attempted to lead from the start. He scored his first major success in 2013 when he won the Maghull Novices' Chase and went on to win the Celebration Chase in 2015 and two editions of the Desert Orchid Chase. In March 2017 he recorded his biggest success when he took the Queen Mother Champion Chase at the fourth attempt. He was euthanized after sustaining an injury in the 2019 Dublin Chase at Leopardstown.

== Background ==
Special Tiara was a bay gelding with no white markings bred in England by his owner David Young. He was sent into training with Henry de Bromhead at Knockeen, County Waterford.

Special Tiara was sired by Kayf Tara, an outstanding stayer who won two Ascot Gold Cups and two Irish St Legers and was a three time Cartier Champion Stayer. His other offspring have included Thistlecrack, Planet of Sound (Punchestown Gold Cup), Blaklion (RSA Chase), Tea For Two (Feltham Novices' Chase) and Carruthers (Hennessy Gold Cup). Special Tiara's dam Special Choice was an unraced, Irish-bred, daughter of Bob Back and a member of the relatively obscure Thoroughbred family 4-e.

== Racing career ==
=== 2011/2012 National Hunt season ===
Special Tiara began his racing career on the amateur Point-to-point circuit, finishing second at the Boulta meeting on 27 November 2011. He then moved to professional competition and was campaigned in novice hurdle races. He finished second at Killarney in May and Clonmel in June before recording his first success at Kilbeggan Racecourse in July, beating Tobar Na Gaoise by five lengths.

=== 2012/2013 National Hunt season ===
In the 2012/2013 season Special Tiara was campaigned in novice chases and made a successful debut over fences when winning at Ballinrobe on 24 September. Sally Rowley-Williams then purchased him and nicknamed him "Mr T", believing this name was more suited to his physique and personality. When moved up in class he finished second to Baily Green in the Grade 3 Buck House Novice Chase at Punchestown in October. After a lengthy break he returned at Leopardstown Racecourse on 3 March and finished fifth of the six runners behind Savello. On 6 April Special Tiara was sent to England to contest the Grade 1 Maghull Novices' Chase at Aintree Racecourse and started the 28/1 outsider in a six-runner field. The Grand Annual Chase winner Alderwood started favourite ahead of Baily Green, Overturn and Sire de Grugy. Ridden by Bryan Cooper he led early in the race before settling in second behind Overturn. He moved up to challenge the leader at the final fence, took the lead on the run-in and won by one and three quarter lengths. Nineteen days later he lined up for the Ryanair Novice Chase at Punchestown, but after leading for most of the way he was overtaken four fences out and finished a distant third behind Arvika Ligeonniere and Ocars Well.

=== 2013/2014 National Hunt season ===
After unseating his rider on his seasonal debut Special Tiara finished third to Kid Cassidy in the Shloer Chase in November on his first appearance at Cheltenham Racecourse. In February at Punchestown he finished last of four behind Arvika Ligeonniere in the Tied Cottage Chase. At the Cheltenham Festival on 12 March he made his first attempt to win the Queen Mother Champion Chase and led for most of the way before fading from the third last and finishing sixth behind Sire de Grugy. In the Celebration Chase at Sandown Park Racecourse in April he produced probably his best effort of the season as he finished third to Sire de Grugy and Pepite Rose. In the summer of 2014 he made one start under Flat racing rules and finished second to the Aidan O'Brien-trained three-year-old Tigris River at Killarney.

=== 2014/2015 National Hunt season ===
Special Tiara was beaten at odds-on on his first two starts of the 2014/2015 season, finishing fifth in a hurdle at Cork and third in a steeplechase at Ballinrobe. After running fourth to Twinlight in the Fortria Chase at Navan Racecourse he was sent to England to contest the Desert Orchid Chase at Kempton Park on 27 December. Ridden by Barry Geraghty he started the 5/1 third choice in the betting behind Balder Succes (Maghull Novices Chase) and Hinterland (Henry VIII Novices' Chase). He went to the front from the start as usual, built up a clear advantage and held on over the last two fences to win by two and a quarter lengths from Balder Succes.

The gelding then made his second bid for the Queen Mother Champion Chase in March and improved on his 2014 effort as he finished third behind Dodging Bullets and Somersby with Sire de Grugy fourth, Sizing Europe seventh and the favourite Sprinter Sacre pulled-up. The 2015 edition of the Celebration Chase on 25 April saw Special Tiara, ridden by Noel Fehily start the 3/1 favourite ahead of Sprinter Sacre, Mr Mole (Game Spirit Chase), Somersby, God's Own (Ryanair Novice Chase) and Vibrato Valtat (Henry VIII Novices' Chase). Although he was briefly led by Mr Mole, Special Tiara made most of the running, went clear of the field approaching the penultimate fence, and won by six lengths from Sprinter Sacre.

=== 2015/2016 National Hunt season ===
Special Tiara began his 2015/2016 campaign with a poor effort in the Fortria Chase, but returned to form at Sandown in December when he finished three quarters of a length second to Sire de Grugy in the Tingle Creek Chase after being hampered at the final fence. Another attempt at the Queen Mother Champion Chase saw him finish third for the second consecutive year as he was beaten three and a half lengths and a nose by Sprinter Sacre and Un de Sceaux. On his only other run of the season he faded badly in the closing stages and came home last of the six finishers behind God' Own in the Punchestown Champion Chase.

=== 2016/2017 National Hunt season ===
On his first appearance of the 2016/2017 season Special Tiara started favourite for the Cheltenham Chase but tired after the second last and finished a distant third behind Fox Norton and Simply Ned. The gelding was without a win in twenty months when he appeared at Kempton on 27 December and attempted to repeat his 2014 success in the Desert Orchid Chase and was made the 8/11 favourite. His task was made considerably easier when his chief rival in the betting, Sire de Grugy fell at the second fence. He led from the start and was never headed, holding off the sustained challenge of the Haldon Gold Cup winner Sir Valentino to win by half a length.

In the Clarence House Chase at Cheltenham on 28 January he led for ten fences but then tired and came home last of the six finishers behind Un de Sceaux. On 15 March 2017 Special Tiara lined up for the fourth time in the Queen Mother Champion Chase in which he was sent off at odds of 11/1 in a ten-runner field. His old rivals God's Own, Fox Norton, Don Valentino and Simply Ned were again in opposition but the overwhelming favourite was Douvan who went off at odds of 2/9 after winning his last fourteen races. After taking the lead at the second fence, Special Tiara, ridden by Fehily, established a clear advantage over the field and jumped the last two lengths in front. Fox Norton launched a strong challenge on the run-in but Special Tiara "held on gamely" and won by a head. There was a gap of six lengths back to Sir Valentino in third while Douvan finished lame in seventh. After the race Fehily said "I got into a great rhythm down the back straight and my horse jumped better than he has ever done before. He’s a wonderful horse and deserved that because he’s been knocking on the door a few times. It’s difficult to make all in the Champion Chase, especially going at that speed, and you’re worried you’re a sitting target for something else. When I jumped the ditch at the top of the hill, I thought Douvan might come past me but I didn’t think anything else would".

== Pedigree ==
Pedigree of Special Tiara (GB), bay gelding, 2007
Sire Kayf Tara (GB) 1994	Sadler's Wells (USA); 1981	Northern Dancer	Nearctic
Sire Kayf Tara (GB) 1994	Sadler's Wells (USA); 1981	Northern Dancer	Natalma
Sire Kayf Tara (GB) 1994	Sadler's Wells (USA); 1981	Fairy Bridge	Bold Reason
Sire Kayf Tara (GB) 1994	Sadler's Wells (USA); 1981	Fairy Bridge	Special
Sire Kayf Tara (GB) 1994	Colorspin (GB); 1983	High Top	Derring-Do
Sire Kayf Tara (GB) 1994	Colorspin (GB); 1983	High Top	Camenae
Sire Kayf Tara (GB) 1994	Colorspin (GB); 1983	Reprocolor	Jimmy Reppin
Sire Kayf Tara (GB) 1994	Colorspin (GB); 1983	Reprocolor	Blue Queen
Dam Special Choice (IRE) 2002	Bob Back (USA); 1981	Roberto	Hail To Reason
Dam Special Choice (IRE) 2002	Bob Back (USA); 1981	Roberto	Bramalea
Dam Special Choice (IRE) 2002	Bob Back (USA); 1981	Toter Back	Carry Back
Dam Special Choice (IRE) 2002	Bob Back (USA); 1981	Toter Back	Romantic Miss
Dam Special Choice (IRE) 2002	Mammy's Choice (IRE); 1990	Mandalus	Mandamus
Dam Special Choice (IRE) 2002	Mammy's Choice (IRE); 1990	Mandalus	Laminate
Dam Special Choice (IRE) 2002	Mammy's Choice (IRE); 1990	Liffey's Choice	Little Buskins
Dam Special Choice (IRE) 2002	Mammy's Choice (IRE); 1990	Liffey's Choice	Nenagh Belle (Family 4-e)
