= Sire De Grugy =

French-bred racehorse (2006–2023)

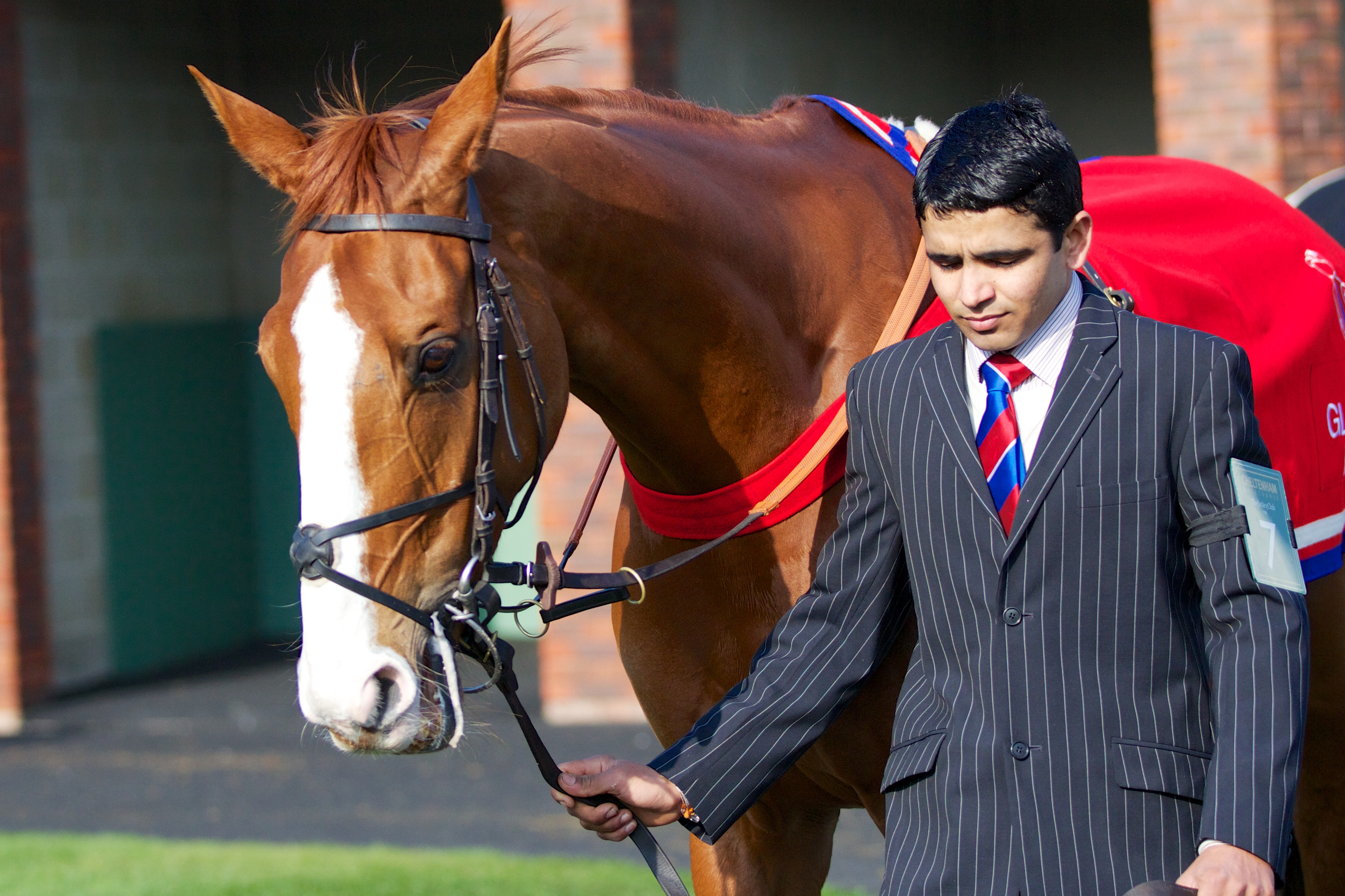
- Sire De Grugy at Cheltenham in March 2014.
- Sire: My Risk
- Grandsire: Take Risks
- Dam: Hirlish
- Damsire: Passing Sale
- Sex: Gelding
- Foaled: 21 June 2006
- Died: August 2023 (aged 17)
- Country: France
- Colour: Chestnut
- Breeder: La Grugerie
- Owner: Preston Family & Friends
- Trainer: Gary Moore
- Record: 42: 17-7-3; 2: 0-1-0 (NHF); 11: 4-1-3 (hurdles); 29: 13-5-0 (fences)
- Earnings: £885,446

Major wins
- Dovecote Novices' Hurdle (2011); Celebration Chase (2013, 2014); Tingle Creek Chase (2013, 2015); Desert Orchid Chase (2013); Clarence House Chase (2014); Queen Mother Champion Chase (2014)

Awards
- British Jump Racing Horse of the Year (2014)

Sire De Grugy (21 June 2006 – August 2023) was a French-bred, British-trained Selle Français racehorse who competed in National Hunt racing. He showed promise in his early career, winning the Dovecote Novices' Hurdle at Kempton Park Racecourse in 2011 and emerged as a top class performer with a win in the Celebration Chase in April 2013. In the 2013–14 National Hunt season he established himself as the leading two-mile steeplechaser in Britain, winning the Tingle Creek Chase, Desert Orchid Chase, Clarence House Chase and the Queen Mother Champion Chase. He continued to run in top-class two-mile steeplechases without fully recapturing his 2013–14 form, winning one race in each of the following three seasons including a second win in the Tingle Creek Chase, before being retired in December 2017.

== Background ==
Sire De Grugy was a chestnut horse with a broad white blaze bred by La Grugerie stud at Pouancé, Maine-et-Loire in France. He was sired by the Thoroughbred stallion My Risk who won seven races including the Prix Quincey, Prix Perth, Prix Edmond Blanc and Prix du Chemin de Fer du Nord. Apart from Sire De Grugy, the best of his progeny has been the flat racer No Risk At All who won La Coupe and the Grand Prix de Vichy-Auvergne. Sire De Grugy's dam Hirlish, was not a Thoroughbred, being descended from La Camargo, a mare of unknown parentage, whose descendants have been classified as AQPS or Selle Français.

As a fiftieth-birthday present, the friends and family of the businessman Steve Preston contributed to a fund which was to be used to buy a racehorse. Preston approached the trainer Gary Moore who agreed to pay 25% of the purchase price providing that he was allowed full control of the horse's career. The trainer's son Jamie Moore, located Sire De Grugy as a likely prospect but the asking price of €50,000 required further financial help from Preston's associates and the horse became the property of the Preston Family & Friends Syndicate.

The gelding was sent into training with Moore at Lower Beeding in West Sussex. He was ridden in all but two of his races by Jamie Moore.

== Racing career ==
=== 2010/2011 National Hunt season: National Hunt Flat races and Novice hurdles ===
Sire De Grugy began his racing career by finishing second in a National Hunt Flat race at Sandown Park Racecourse on 6 November 2010. He made his debut over obstacles in a novice hurdle two weeks later at Kempton Park in which he finished second to the future Cheltenham Gold Cup winner Bobs Worth. The gelding returned to National Hunt Flat racing at Kempton in December and finished fourth behind Chain Of Command. At Fakenham Racecourse on 1 January he recorded his first success as he won a maiden hurdle by nineteen lengths at odds of 4/9. In February he won a novice hurdle at Folkestone Racecourse by sixteen lengths and then moved up in class to take the Grade II Dovecote Novices' Hurdle at Kempton beating Empire Levant by eleven lengths. On his final appearance of the season he started the 9/2 favourite for the Top Novices' Hurdle at Aintree Racecourse in April but finished third behind Topolski and Oilily.

=== 2011/2012 National Hunt season ===
In the following season Sire De Grugy was campaigned in handicap hurdle races. He made his seasonal reappearance in January when he finished sixth at Chepstow Racecourse and then finished fourth behind Zarkandar in the Tote Gold Trophy. He recorded his only success of the season on 21 February when he carried top weight of 160 pounds to victory at Taunton Racecourse. He finished third in the Imperial Cup at Sandown in March and ended his season by finishing eighth (ridden by Joshua Moore) behind Lifestyle at Aintree in April.

=== 2012/2013 National Hunt season: Novice chases ===
In the 2012/2013 National Hunt season, Sire De Grugy raced in novice steeplechase, making a successful debut over larger obstacles at Kempton on 21 October. He finished second to Captain Conan in the Grade II November Novices' Chase at Cheltenham Racecourse on 18 November before winning a minor event at Lingfield Park nine days later, where he suffered a hairline fracture to his pelvis.

After a four-month break, Sire De Grugy returned in spring and ran three times in three weeks. He finished fourth to Special Tiara in the Grade I Maghull Novices' Chase at Aintree on 6 April before winning a minor novices' event at Stratford Racecourse fifteen days later. On 27 April he started at odds of 6/1 for the Celebration Chase at Sandown in which he was matched against more experienced chasers including Sanctuaire, who had won the race in 2012 and Finian's Rainbow, the winner of the 2012 Champion Chase. Moore tracked the leaders before moving up to challenge Finian's Rainbow at the last fence. He took the lead on the run in and was driven out to win his first major steeplechase by one and three-quarter lengths.

=== 2013/2014 National Hunt season ===
Sire De Grugy began his fourth season in a handicap chase at Chepstow on 26 October, in which he carried top weight of 166 pounds. Starting at odds of 7/2, he took the lead after the third last and accelerated clear of his rivals to win in "impressive" style by eleven lengths despite a mistake at the last. On 17 November, the gelding started as odds-on favourite for the Shloer Chase at Cheltenham. He recovered from several jumping errors to take the lead at the second last but was overtaken fifty yards from the finish and beaten by the Nicky Henderson-trained Kid Cassidy, who was carrying ten pounds less. Three weeks later, Sire De Grugy started joint-favourite with Captain Conan for the Grade I Tingle Creek Trophy at Sandown. Moore restrained the gelding in the early stages before moving forward to challenge for the lead approaching the final fence. Sire De Grugy went clear on the run-in to win by four lengths from the Mick Channon-trained nine-year-old Somersby with Captain Conan in third place. On 27 December, Sire De Grugy was matched against the outstanding two-mile chaser Sprinter Sacre, winner of his last ten races, in the Grade II Desert Orchid Chase at Kempton. Sprinter Sacre was pulled up after the seventh fence (subsequent veterinary examinations revealed a heart problem), leaving Sire De Grugy to take the lead four fences from the finish and win by four lengths from Oiseau de Nuit, with a gap of twenty-six lengths back to Astracad in third.

On 18 January, Sire De Grugy started 5/4 favourite for the Grade I Clarence House Chase at Ascot Racecourse. As in some of his earlier races, he jumped to the left at several fences but took the lead approaching the second last and went clear of his rivals to win by eleven lengths from the Irish-trained Hidden Cyclone.

Sire De Grugy made his first appearance at the Cheltenham Festival when he was one of eleven horses to contest the Queen Mother Champion Chase. He started the 11/4 favourite in a field which included Captain Conan, Somersby, Special Tiara and the 2011 winner Sizing Europe. His odds had lengthened after doubt about his ability to cope with the peculiarities of the course and the drying ground. Moore rode the horse with great confidence, holding him up at the back of the field before moving up to track the leaders three fences from the finish. He took the lead approaching the last and went clear to win by six lengths from Somersby. After the race, Jamie Moore said "I've got a good rapport with this horse, I love him to pieces. It's all down to him. It's a great effort by Dad as well. He's had no credit this season, as far as I'm concerned, but it's all down to the horse. I love him so much. It's tremendous for all the family. It proves we can do it". Gary Moore commented "it's something I hoped would happen but it doesn't happen very often. The plan worked out very well. The horse is professional and easy to train to a certain extent. He trod on a stone 10 days ago and it was a little worry but it couldn't have gone any better today". Sire De Grugy, who had already been named British jump racing's Horse of the Year, ended his season by repeating his 2013 success in the Celebration Chase at Sandown. Starting the 2/7 favourite against five opponents, he took the lead at the second last fence and won by three and a quarter lengths from the mare Pepite Rose. Jamie Moore said that the horse was unsuited by the "tacky" ground whilst his trainer said "He was the most on edge he's been all season when I was saddling him and he was probably coming to end of his tether. But that shows what a great horse he is."

=== 2014/2015 National Hunt season ===
Sire De Grugy was expected to return at Cheltenham in November, but was found to be lame shortly before his scheduled comeback: subsequent veterinary tests revealed a hip injury. The gelding eventually reappeared after an absence of more than nine months in the Game Spirit Chase at Newbury on 7 February 2015. He started 10/11 favourite but unseated Jamie Moore at the third last in a race won easily by the Paul Nicholls-trained Mr Mole. Two weeks later, the gelding contested the Bombay Hunt Cup at Chepstow in which he carried twenty pounds more than his three opponents. Starting the 5/4 favourite, he took the lead two fences from the finish and drew away in the closing stages to win by seven lengths from Grey Gold.

On 11 March, Sire De Grugy attempted to repeat his 2014 success in the Queen Mother Champion Stakes in which he was opposed by two previous winners of the race in Sprinter Sacre and Sizing Europe. After being restrained in the early stages he began to make progress four fences from the finish but was never able to reach the leaders and finished fourth behind Dodging Bullets, Somersby and Special Tiara. He was moved up in distance for the Melling Chase at Aintree but fell at the sixth fence.

=== 2015/2016 National Hunt season ===
Sire De Grugy made a disappointing seasonal debut in the Grade 2 Haldon Gold Cup where after a bad error at the fourth fence he failed to keep up with the leaders and was eased in the home straight to finish last of the five runners, but returned to winning ways in his next start on 5 December regaining the Grade 1 Tingle Creek Chase by three parts of a length from Special Tiara with which he had a mid-air interference at the last fence forcing the race to go through a stewards inquiry but the winning result stood with his jockey Jamie Moore reporting: "He always jumps left, he's jumped a bit left again at the last".

Just three weeks later he had another outing, on 27 December, in the Grade 2 Desert Orchid Chase which he had previously won in 2013. He encountered four rivals and started second favourite. After closely tracking the leader Somersby, he took control at the 7th fence but made a costly mistake at the final obstacle at which he surrendered the lead and just failed by three-parts of a length at the line, finishing second to Sprinter Sacre. A month later he again started second favourite in the betting, this time in the Grade 1 Clarence House Chase which he won in 2014. He was racing against the up-and-coming Un de Sceaux who was sent as a very short odds favourite at 1/2 thanks to his unbeaten record at the time in all of his completed starts. Sire De Grugy chased him for the entire race but after looking like a threat at the second-last fence he failed to make any impressions and finished tired, five lengths away in second spot with his stablemate Traffic Fluide just a short head in third. Contesting the Champion Chase at the Cheltenham Festival for the third time, Sire De Grugy came last of the eight finishers, beaten 67 lengths by Sprinter Sacre. On his final outing of the season, he was beaten into fourth place by Sprinter Sacre in the Celebration Chase at Sandown.

=== 2016/2017 National Hunt season ===
Sire De Grugy's first race of the season was the Old Roan Chase at Aintree, where he came last of seven runners. He then won the Shawbrook Handicap Chase at Ascot in November, in what was to be his final victory. In December he came second in the Tingle Creek, beaten a length by Un De Sceaux. His last outing of the season was in the Desert Orchid Chase, where he unseated Moore at the second fence.

=== 2017/2018 National Hunt season and retirement ===
Sire De Grugy started the season with his first outing over hurdles since 2012, third in the Welsh Champion Hurdle at Ffos Las, sixteen lengths behind The New One. After disappointing finishes in the Shawbrook Handicap Chase at Ascot and the Junior Jumpers Chase at Cheltenham, the decision was made to retire him in December 2017. He spent two months the following summer learning to be a riding horse at the Retraining of Racehorses stables at the National Horseracing Museum in Newmarket, before returning to the Moore family for the remainder of his retirement.

Sire De Grugy died in August 2023, at the age of 17.

== Pedigree ==
Pedigree of Sire De Grugy, chestnut gelding, 2006
| Sire My Risk (FR) 1999 | Take Risks (FR); 1989 | Highest Honor | Kenmare |
| Sire My Risk (FR) 1999 | Take Risks (FR); 1989 | Highest Honor | High River |
| Sire My Risk (FR) 1999 | Take Risks (FR); 1989 | Baino Bluff | Be My Guest |
| Sire My Risk (FR) 1999 | Take Risks (FR); 1989 | Baino Bluff | Rapids |
| Sire My Risk (FR) 1999 | Miss Pat (FR); 1990 | Vacarme | Lyphard |
| Sire My Risk (FR) 1999 | Miss Pat (FR); 1990 | Vacarme | Virunga |
| Sire My Risk (FR) 1999 | Miss Pat (FR); 1990 | Miss Mood | Bon Sang |
| Sire My Risk (FR) 1999 | Miss Pat (FR); 1990 | Miss Mood | Missy |
| Dam Hirlish (FR) 1995 | Passing Sale (FR); 1987 | No Pass No Sale | Northfields |
| Dam Hirlish (FR) 1995 | Passing Sale (FR); 1987 | No Pass No Sale | No Disgrace |
| Dam Hirlish (FR) 1995 | Passing Sale (FR); 1987 | Reachout and Touch | Youth |
| Dam Hirlish (FR) 1995 | Passing Sale (FR); 1987 | Reachout and Touch | Everything Nice |
| Dam Hirlish (FR) 1995 | Tara Kane (FR); 1985 | Chamberlin | Green Dancer |
| Dam Hirlish (FR) 1995 | Tara Kane (FR); 1985 | Chamberlin | On The Wing |
| Dam Hirlish (FR) 1995 | Tara Kane (FR); 1985 | Laida | Alfaro |
| Dam Hirlish (FR) 1995 | Tara Kane (FR); 1985 | Laida | Dariga (Selle Français) |
