= Harry Grimshaw (jockey) =

English jockey

Personal information
- Born: 1841
- Died: 4 October 1866 (aged 24–25)
- Occupation: Jockey

Horse racing career
- Sport: Horse racing

Major racing wins
- Major races 2,000 Guineas Stakes (1865); Epsom Derby (1865); St Leger (1865)

Significant horses
- Gladiateur

Harry or Henry Grimshaw (1841 - 1866) was an English jockey, most famous for winning the British Triple Crown in 1865 on Gladiateur.

He was born in Lancashire and became apprentice to John Osborne. He was a competent jockey, but suffered from being short-sighted. He married Osborne's daughter at Middleham, North Yorkshire.

For Osborne, he won the 1859 Cambridgeshire on Red Eagle. In 1862, he left Middleham for Newmarket and became jockey to Count Frédéric de Lagrange at the stables of Thomas Jennings. This meant he took the ride on Lagrange's Gladiateur in the Classics of 1865, all of which he won, becoming only the second man, after Frank Butler, to win the Triple Crown.

The following year, on 4 October, he was killed when the trap in which he was travelling home to Newmarket overturned in the dark. He is buried in Coverham churchyard near Middleham.

== Major wins ==
(United Kingdom) Great Britain

- 2,000 Guineas Stakes - Gladiateur (1865)
- Epsom Derby - Gladiateur (1865)
- St Leger - Gladiateur (1865)

== Bibliography ==
- Mortimer, Roger; Onslow, Richard; Willett, Peter (1978). Biographical Encyclopedia of British Flat Racing. Macdonald and Jane’s. ISBN 0-354-08536-0.
