= Azertyuiop =

Azertyuiop may refer to:

- the first letters row of AZERTY, the French and Belgian keyboard layout
- Azertyuiop (horse), a top-class 2 mile National Hunt steeplechase horse
