= Jamie Moore (jockey) =

English jockey

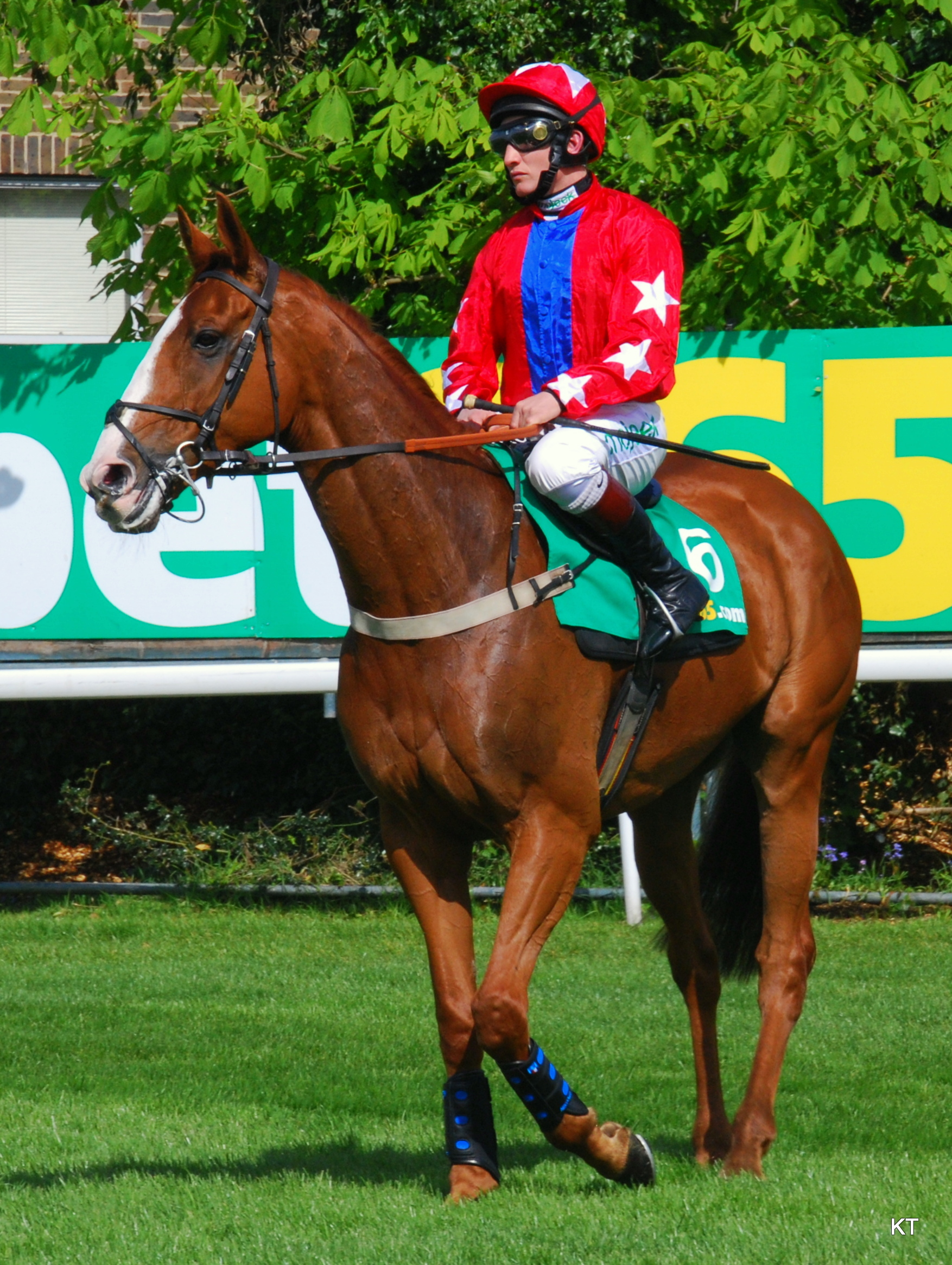
Jamie Moore riding Sire De Grugy (2014 Celebration Chase).

Jamie Moore (born 31 January 1985) is a retired English National Hunt jockey. Over a career spanning 23 seasons he rode 968 winners including seven wins in Grade 1 races. The highlight of his career was winning the 2014 Queen Mother Champion Chase on Sire de Grugy, trained by his father.

== Background ==
Moore has a family background in racing. His father is dual purpose trainer and former jump jockey Gary Moore; his mother Jayne also rode as an amateur jockey. His older brother is three times champion flat racing jockey Ryan Moore; younger brother Joshua was a jump jockey until injury put an end to his career in 2022; younger sister Hayley is a racecourse presenter for Sky Sports Racing and has ridden as an amateur jockey.

== Career as a jockey ==
Moore started racing in the 2001/02 season, riding his first winner the following season. In total he rode 968 winners over 23 seasons. His first Grade race victory was the Elite Hurdle on Well Chief for Martin Pipe in November 2003 and he was crowned champion conditional jockey in 2024. Another Martin Pipe runner, It Takes Time gave him with his first Grade 1 victory, in the Ascot Chase in February 2005. Sire de Grugy, trained by his father, provided Moore with five Grade 1 wins, including the 2014 Queen Mother Champion Chase, his only win at the Cheltenham Festival. He won the 2014 Scottish Grand National on Al Co, and the 2015 (Note: Run in January 2016 due to weather conditions.) Welsh Grand National on Mountainous. His most successful season in terms of winners was 2021/22, when he rode 80 winners.

Moore announced his retirement in February 2024, ending a career in which he rode 968 winners. He had sustained serious injuries in a fall at Lingfield in November 2023 and accepted medical advice not to return to race riding.

== Major wins ==
(United Kingdom) Great Britain

- Ascot Chase – (1) – It Takes Time (2005)
- Tingle Creek Chase – (2) – Sire de Grugy (2013, 2015)
- Clarence House Chase – (1) – Sire de Grugy (2014)
- Queen Mother Champion Chase – (1) – Sire de Grugy (2014)
- Scottish Grand National – (1) – Al Co (2014)
- Celebration Chase – (1 (Note: Sire de Grugy also won in 2013, when the race was Grade 2.)) – Sire de Grugy (2014)
- Welsh Grand National – (1) – Mountainous (2015)
- Finale Juvenile Hurdle – (1) – Porticello (2021 (Note: The following year the race was downgraded to Grade 2.))
