= Dunkirk (British horse) =

British-bred Thoroughbred racehorse

- Sire: Domaha
- Grandsire: Vatout
- Dam: Tolldown
- Damsire: Davy Jones
- Sex: Gelding
- Foaled: 1957
- Country: Great Britain
- Colour: Brown
- Breeder: F J Akerman
- Owner: William H Whitbread
- Trainer: Peter Cazalet
- Record: 18 starts 9 wins

Major wins
- Calor Gas Chase (1964); Newbury Spring Chase (1965); Two-Mile Champion Chase (1965); Frogmore Chase (1965); Mackeson Gold Cup (1965)

Awards
- Timeform rating: 186

Dunkirk (1957 – 27 December 1965) was a British Thoroughbred racehorse. He won nine of his eighteen races over fences including a 20-length victory in the 1965 Two-Mile Champion Chase at the Cheltenham Festival. The following season he died in the King George VI Chase. He was owned by Bill Whitbread and trained by Peter Cazalet.

== Background ==
Dunkirk was a brown gelding foaled in 1957. He was sired by Domaha, a son of Vatout. Dunkirk's dam was Tolldown, a daughter of Davy Jones. Davy Jones ran out at the final fence of the 1936 Grand National when in a clear lead. Dunkirk was trained by Peter Cazalet.

== Racing career ==
Dunkirk raced in novice chases during the 1963/64 National Hunt season. After leading much of the race, he was beaten by Buona Notte in the Henry VIII Novices' Chase at Sandown Park, finishing as the runner-up. At the Cheltenham Festival, Dunkirk ran in the Cotswold Chase. He fell at the penultimate fence, and the race was won by Greektown.

The following season, he ran unsuccessfully over two and a half miles before being dropped back to two miles to win the Newbury Spring Chase. He then won the National Hunt Two-Mile Champion Chase at Cheltenham, beating second-placed Greektown by 20 lengths in a field that also included Ben Stack, who won the race the previous year.

Dunkirk started the 1965/66 season by beating Mill House by 15 lengths to win the two-mile Frogmore Chase at Ascot. He followed this victory up by winning the Mackeson Gold Cup, despite carrying top weight of 12 stone 7 pounds. In the King George VI Chase, he was well clear of the field when he started to slow, allowing Arkle to gain on him. Dunkirk crashed through a fence while Arkle was trying to match strides with him. He broke his neck in the fall, but a vet's report stated that he had suffered from the equine flu and his lungs were full of blood; therefore, he was dying before he took off at that final fence. In total, he won nine of his eighteen races over fences. Among his other wins was the 1964 Calor Gas Chase.

Timeform rate Dunkirk as one of the best National Hunt horses ever, with a rating of 186.
