= La Coupe =

Flat horse race in France

- Class: Group 3
- Location: Longchamp Racecourse; Paris, France
- Inaugurated: 1865
- Race type: Flat / Thoroughbred
- Website: france-galop.com

Race information
- Distance: 2,000 metres (1¼ miles)
- Surface: Turf
- Track: Right-handed
- Qualification: Four-years-old and up exc. G2 winners this year
- Weight: 57 kg Allowances; 1½ kg for fillies and mares Penalties; 3 kg for Group 1 winners * 2 kg for Group 2 winners * 1 kg for Group 3 winners * * since September 1 last year
- Purse: €80,000 (2022); 1st: €40,000

La Coupe
2025
Goliath	Grand Stars	Augustus

Previous years
2024
Calif	Al Hakeem	Zarir
2023
West Wind Blows	Hooking	Plesant Jane
2022
Monty	Hurricane Dream	Kertez
2021
Iresine	Magny Cours	Grand Glory

2020-2011
2020
Telecaster	Romanciere	Mr Satchmo
2019
Danceteria	Soleil Marin	Spotify
2018
Dallas Affair	Marathon Man	Syrita
2017
Robin Of Navan	Garlingari	First Sitting
2016
Air Pilot	Elliptique	Night Wish
2015
Bello Matteo	Sparkling Beam	Elliptique
2014
Narniyn	Ipswich	Ocovango
2013
Slow Pace	Smoking Sun	Harem Lady
2012
No Risk At All	Meandre	Sortilege
2011
Cirrus Des Aigles	Announce	Stacelita

2010–2001
2010
Stacelita	Court Canibal	Russian Cross
2009
Stotsfold	Starlish	Bon Grain
2008
Crossharbour	Spirit One	Boris De Deauville
2007
Stage Gift	Willywell	Atlantic Air
2006
Blue Monday	Annenkov	Archange D'Or
2005
Artiste Royal	Diamond Green	Autumn Glory
2004
Aubonne	Soldier Hollow	Look Honey
2003
Carnival Dancer	Naheef	Victorian Order
2002
Equerry	Sensible	Mister Kybelee
2001
Slew The Red	Di Moi Oui	Island House

2000–1990
2000
Slickly	Agol Lack	Kerrygold
1999
Ultimately Lucky	Native Justice	Kadance Ville
1998
Public Purse	Farasan	Running Stag
1997
For Valour	Si Seductor	Bulington
1996
Dance Treat	Bulington	Diamond Mix
1995
Marildo	Baron Ferdinand	Solidoun
1994
Flag Down	Jeune Homme	Regency
1993
D'Arros	Marildo	Diese
1992
Wiorno	Runyon	Deja
1991
Art Bleu	Avec Les Bleus	Incessant
1990
French Glory	Tycana	Wall Street Wonder

La Coupe is a Group 3 flat horse race in France open to thoroughbreds aged four years or older. It is run at Longchamp over a distance of 2,000 metres (about 1¼ miles), and it is scheduled to take place each year in June.

== History ==
The event was established in 1865, and the first edition was won by Fille de l'Air. The race was named after its original trophy, which at that time was worth 10,000 francs. It was initially open to horses aged three or older and contested over 3,200 metres. It was shortened to 3,000 metres in 1895.

La Coupe was cancelled throughout World War I, with no running from 1915 to 1919. During World War II, it was temporarily switched to Le Tremblay (1943) and Maisons-Laffitte (1944–45).

The race was closed to three-year-olds and cut to 2,600 metres in 1969. It was held at Chantilly in 1980, and from this point its distance was 2,400 metres. It returned to Chantilly in 1982, 1983 and 1985.

The distance of the race was reduced to 2,100 metres in 1991. It was cut to 2,000 metres in 1993. The event was staged at Saint-Cloud in 1994, Évry in 1995, and Saint-Cloud again in 1996.

== Records ==
Most successful horse (2 wins):

- Nougat – 1875, 1876
- Lutin – 1894, 1895
- Elf – 1897, 1898
- Lesotho – 1987, 1988

Leading jockey (7 wins):

- Christophe Soumillon – Aubonne (2004), Stacelita (2010), Narniyn (2014), Air Pilot (2016), Telecaster (2020), West Wind Blows (2023), Goliath (2025)

Leading trainer (9 wins):

- Tom Jennings – Fille de l'Air (1865), Gladiateur (1866), Nelusco (1868), Trocadero (1869), Mortemer (1870), Nougat (1875, 1876), Balagny (1878), Castillon (1880, dead-heat)

Leading owner (9 wins):

- Frédéric de Lagrange – Fille de l'Air (1865), Gladiateur (1866), Nelusco (1868), Trocadero (1869), Mortemer (1870), Nougat (1875, 1876), Balagny (1878), Castillon (1880, dead-heat)

== Winners since 1980 ==
Year	Winner	Age	Jockey	Trainer	Owner	Time
1980	Prove It Baby	4	Philippe Paquet	François Boutin	Walter Haefner	2:31.90
1981	Perrault	4	Yves Saint-Martin	Pierre Pelat	Thierry van Zuylen	2:49.40
1982	Terreno	4	Cash Asmussen	François Boutin	Gerry Oldham	2:39.70
1983	Zalataia	4	Freddy Head	André Fabre	Francis Baral	2:24.50
1984	Garde Royale	4	Gérard Dubroeucq	André Fabre	Ella Widener Wetherill	2:39.40
1985	Romildo	5	Cash Asmussen	François Boutin	Gerry Oldham	2:25.10
1986	Triptych	4	Yves Saint-Martin	Patrick Biancone	Alan Clore	2:38.40
1987	Lesotho	4	Gary W. Moore	Criquette Head	Khalid Abdullah	2:34.40
1988	Lesotho	5	Gary W. Moore	Criquette Head	Khalid Abdullah	2:30.00
1989	Athyka	4	Guy Guignard	Criquette Head	Jacques Wertheimer	2:36.50
1990	French Glory	4	Cash Asmussen	André Fabre	Khalid Abdullah	2:32.50
1991	Art Bleu	4	Dominique Boeuf	Élie Lellouche	Daniel Wildenstein	2:09.30
1992	Wiorno	4	Thierry Jarnet	André Fabre	Etti Plesch	2:15.20
1993	D'Arros	4	Cash Asmussen	François Boutin	Stavros Niarchos	2:07.60
1994	Flag Down	4	Gérald Mossé	John Hammond	Cheveley Park Stud	2:05.20
1995	Marildo	8	Guy Guignard	David Smaga	David Smaga	2:01.30
1996	Dance Treat	4	Olivier Doleuze	Dominique Sépulchre	Peter Pritchard	2:03.40
1997	For Valour	4	Thierry Gillet	André Fabre	Tony Richards	2:09.30
1998	Public Purse	4	Alain Junk	André Fabre	Khalid Abdullah	2:03.50
1999	Ultimately Lucky	4	Alain Junk	Jean-Paul Gallorini	Jocelyne Sénéchal	2:05.40
2000	Slickly	4	Sylvain Guillot	Saeed bin Suroor	Godolphin	2:04.70
2001	Slew the Red	4	Olivier Peslier	André Fabre	Maktoum Al Maktoum	2:06.70
2002	Equerry	4	Yutaka Take	Saeed bin Suroor	Godolphin	2:07.50
2003	Carnival Dancer	5	Olivier Peslier	Amanda Perrett	Cheveley Park Stud	2:06.60
2004	Aubonne	4	Christophe Soumillon	Eric Libaud	Ingeborg von Schubert	2:05.00
2005	Artiste Royal	4	Stéphane Pasquier	Élie Lellouche	Ecurie Wildenstein	2:07.00
2006	Blue Monday	5	Steve Drowne	Roger Charlton	Mountgrange Stud	2:10.50
2007	Stage Gift	4	Kerrin McEvoy	Saeed bin Suroor	Godolphin	2:06.60
2008	Crossharbour	4	Johan Victoire	André Fabre	Khalid Abdullah	2:02.00
2009	Stotsfold	6	Adam Kirby	Walter Swinburn	Peter Harris	2:05.10
2010	Stacelita	4	Christophe Soumillon	Jean-Claude Rouget	Martin Schwartz	2:08.90
2011	Cirrus des Aigles	5	Franck Blondel	Corine Barande-Barbe	Jean-Claude Dupouy	2:07.66
2012	No Risk at All	5	Ioritz Mendizabal	Jean-Paul Gallorini	Jean-Paul Gallorini	2:08.95
2013	Slow Pace	5	Olivier Peslier	Freddy Head	Wertheimer et Frère	2:09.24
2014	Narniyn	4	Christophe Soumillon	Alain de Royer-Dupré	HH Aga Khan	2:10.19
2015	Bello Matteo	4	Alexis Badel	Romain Le Gal	Rocci Stasi	2:04.80
2016	Air Pilot (Note: The 2016 & 2017 races took place at Chantilly while Longchamp was closed for redevelopment)	7	Christophe Soumillon	Ralph Beckett	Lady Cobham	2:07.66
2017	Robin of Navan	4	Cristian Demuro	Harry Dunlop	Cross, Deal, Foden, Sieff	1:59.45
2018	Dallas Affair	4	Aurélien Lemaitre	Freddy Head	George Strawbridge Jr.	2:04.91
2019	Danceteria	4	Jamie Spencer	David Menuisier	Australian / Washbourn	2:09.63
2020	Telecaster	4	Christophe Soumillon	Hughie Morrison	Castle Down Racing	2:01.98
2021	Iresine	4	Mlle Marie Velon	Jean-Pierre Gauvin	Bertrand Milliere	2:06.25
2022	Monty	7	Olivier Peslier	Andreas Schütz	AB Racing Limited, Ecurie Ades Hazan & Davy Bonilla	2:08.13
2023	West Wind Blows	4	Christophe Soumillon	Simon & Ed Crisford	Abdulla Al Mansoori	2:02.72
2024	Calif	5	Alexis Pouchin	C & Y Lerner	Victorious	2:4.07
2025	Goliath	5	Christophe Soumillon	Francis-Henri Graffard	Resolute Bloodstock & Philip Baron von Ullman	2:08.62
2026	Nitoi	4	Stéphane Pasquier	André Fabre	Wertheimer et Frère	2:01:99

== Earlier winners ==
- 1865: Fille de l'Air
- 1866: Gladiateur
- 1867: Normandie
- 1868: Nelusco
- 1869: Trocadero
- 1870: Mortemer
- 1871: no race
- 1872: Clotaire
- 1873: Barbillon
- 1874: Franc Tireur
- 1875: Nougat
- 1876: Nougat
- 1877: Stracchino
- 1878: Balagny
- 1879: Brie
- 1880: Castillon / Fitz Plutus (Note: The 1880 race was a dead-heat and has joint winners)
- 1881: Le Destrier
- 1882: Bariolet
- 1883: Mademoiselle de Senlis
- 1884: Formalite
- 1885: Fra Diavolo
- 1886: The Condor
- 1887: Alger
- 1888: Brisolier
- 1889: Fligny
- 1890: Prix Fixe
- 1891: Barberousse
- 1892: Amadis
- 1893: Medium
- 1894: Lutin
- 1895: Lutin
- 1896: Addy
- 1897: Elf
- 1898: Elf
- 1899: Rembrandt
- 1900: Apex
- 1901:
- 1902: Kakimono
- 1903: Sans Profit
- 1904: Iermak
- 1905: Rataplan
- 1906: Marsan
- 1907: Moulins la Marche
- 1908: L'Inconnu
- 1909: Drapeau
- 1910: Chulo
- 1911: Rire aux Larmes
- 1912: Corton
- 1913: Amadou
- 1914: Tortika
- 1915–19: no race
- 1920: Passebreul
- 1921: Lord Frey
- 1922: Binic
- 1923: Sens
- 1924: Rusa
- 1925: Hohneck
- 1926: The Wolf
- 1927: Bois Josselyn
- 1928: Mars en Careme
- 1929: Feb
- 1930: Zeus II
- 1931: Raeburn
- 1932: Taxodium
- 1933: Bleu Horizon
- 1934: Pons Legend
- 1935: Bokbul
- 1936: Le Vizir
- 1937: Cormery
- 1938: The Spy
- 1939: Sesterce
- 1940:
- 1941: Marjolet
- 1942: L'Aligote
- 1943:
- 1944:
- 1945:
- 1946: Flossie
- 1947: Diable Gris
- 1948:
- 1949: Bye Bye
- 1950: Miel Rosa
- 1951: Belphegor
- 1952: Ksiri
- 1953: Romantisme
- 1954: Ranchiquito
- 1955: Pasithee
- 1956: Jithaka
- 1957:
- 1958: Pepin le Bref
- 1959: Birum
- 1960: Norok
- 1961: Galoubet
- 1962: Saint Florent
- 1963: Darling Boy
- 1964: Waldmeister
- 1965: Fantomas
- 1966: Vleuten
- 1967: Timour
- 1968: Excalibur
- 1969: Taineval
- 1970: Park Top
- 1971: High Game
- 1972: Karoon
- 1973: Sang Bleu
- 1974: Balompie
- 1975: Campo Moro
- 1976: Beau Buck
- 1977: Palei
- 1978: Guadanini
- 1979: African Hope

== See also ==
- List of French flat horse races
