= John Reid Walker =

British polo player and racehorse breeder

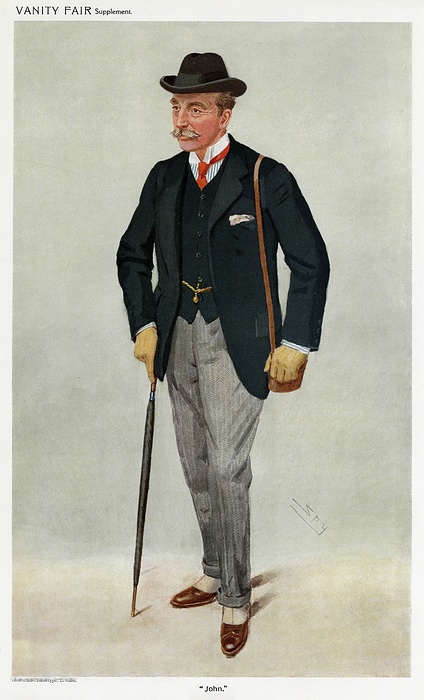
"John", caricature by Spy in Vanity Fair, 1909.

John Reid Walker JP TD (4 June 1855 – 6 March 1934) was a British polo player and racehorse breeder.

He was the son of Andrew Barclay Walker and brother of William Walker, 1st Baron Wavertree and was educated at Rugby School.

He was an accomplished polo player and became a breeder of polo ponies and racehorses. He established the Ruckley Stud farm at his home, Ruckley Grange, near Shifnal, Shropshire. There he bred Invershin and Inkerman, both bay colts by the sire Invincible and both high class stayers. Invershin won back-to-back Gold Cups at Ascot in 1928 and 1929, and other good races including successive victories in the Caledonian Hunt and a Derby Cup. Inkerman's two most notable wins were in the 1923 Jockey Club Stakes at Newmarket and the 1924 Chester Vase.

He was a Justice of the Peace for Staffordshire and was appointed High Sheriff of Shropshire for 1917–18. He attained the rank of Colonel in the South Lancashire Regiment.

He married Katherine Howard, daughter of John Cartland. They had two sons and two daughters.
