= John Daley (jockey) =

British jockey

Personal information
- Born: 1846 Newmarket, Suffolk
- Died: c. 1890
- Occupation: Jockey

Horse racing career
- Sport: Horse racing

Major racing wins
- Major races 2,000 Guineas Stakes (1870); Epsom Derby (1867); Epsom Oaks (1867)

Significant horses
- Hermit, Hippia, Macgregor

John Daley (1846 - c. 1890) was a three-time British Classic winning jockey, who most notably won The Derby/Oaks double in 1867.

== Career ==
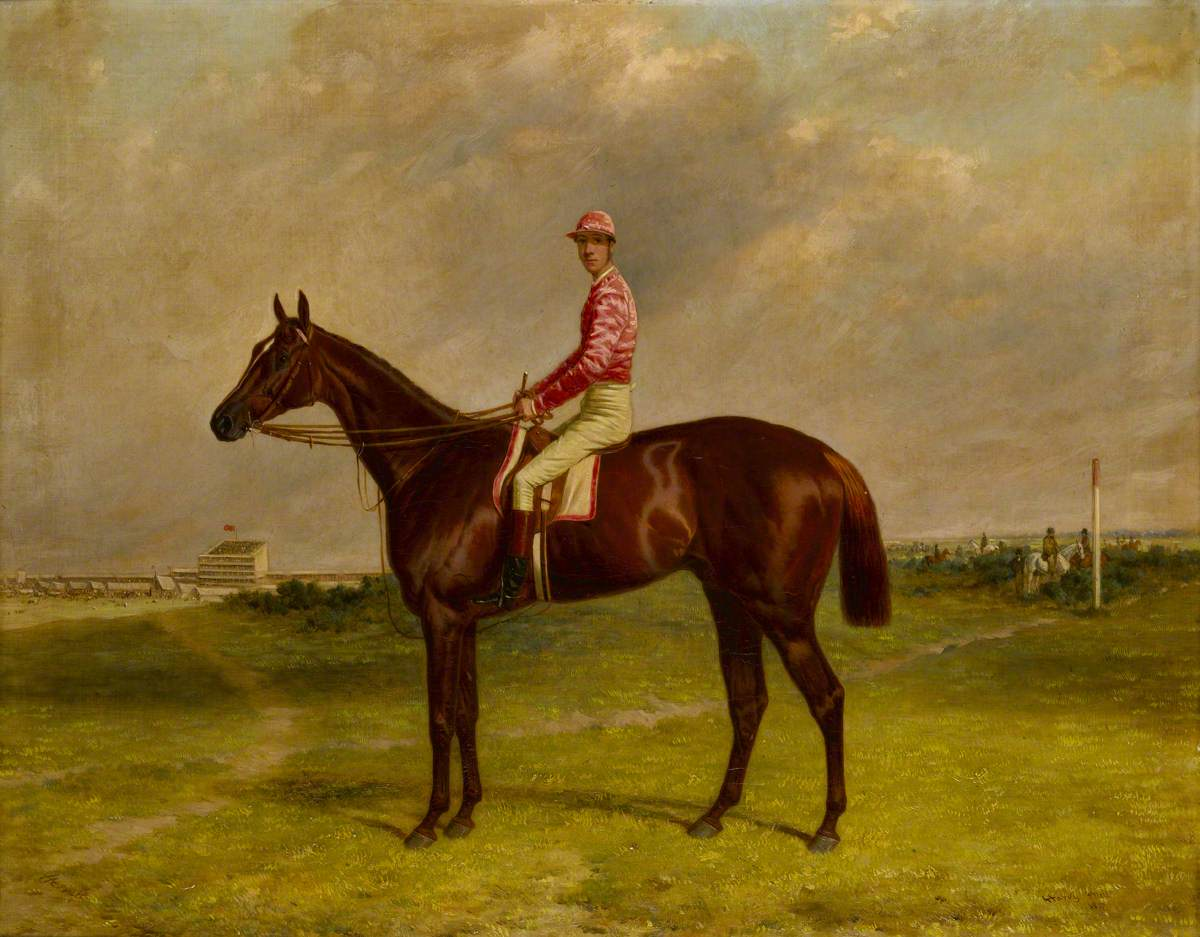
Hermit with Jockey Up at Epsom, 1867

Daley was born in Newmarket, Suffolk in 1846. His father was a racehorse trainer for Sir Robert Clifton and others.

His first winner was Renown, carrying 5st 6lbs, at the first Newmarket Spring Meeting of 1857. He received the patronage of owners including Baron Meyer de Rothschild.

He won four races at Royal Ascot in 1860 - the Queen's Stand Stakes and Fern Hill Stakes on Queen of the Vale, a £100 Plate, and the Coronation Stakes on Allington. In 1861, he won the Goodwood Stakes on Elcho for Lord Coventry.

He was booked to ride Hermit in the 1867 Derby after the horse had broken a blood vessel in a training gallop and the intended jockey Henry Custance was released to ride The Rake. Daley was paid £100, with the promise of another £100 if he could get the horse placed, £3,000 if he won. Daley brought Hermit for a late run, on the orders of trainer Captain Machell, and won by a neck from Marksman in the final strides. Two days later he added the Oaks on Hippia for Rothschild.

By early manhood, Daley was struggling to make the weights required. He had a big frame and was taller than Fred Archer. In 1870, it appeared his career was coming to an end. In a final major victory, he won that year's 2,000 Guineas on Macgregor, but he was 1lb overweight for the ride and would have been too weak to ride a close finish.

He died around 1890.

== Major wins ==
(United Kingdom) Great Britain

- 2,000 Guineas Stakes - Macgregor (1870)
- Epsom Derby - Hermit (1867)
- Epsom Oaks - Hippia (1867)

== Bibliography ==
- Mortimer, Roger; Onslow, Richard; Willett, Peter (1978). Biographical Encyclopedia of British Flat Racing. Macdonald and Jane’s. ISBN 0-354-08536-0.
