= Molyneux Hurdle =

Hurdle horse race in Britain

- Class: Grade 2
- Location: Aintree Racecourse, Aintree, England
- Race type: Hurdle race
- Website: Aintree

Race information
- Distance: 2m 209y
- Surface: Turf
- Track: Left-handed
- Qualification: Four-years-old and up
- Weight: 11 st 2 lb Allowances; 7 lb for fillies and mares Penalties; 6 lb for winners of a Grade 1 or Grade 2 hurdle race* 4 lb for winners of a Grade 3 or Listed hurdle race* *After 30 September 2024
- Purse: £70,000 (2025); 1st: £41,608

Molyneux Hurdle
2026
Alexei	Mange Tout	Lucky Place

Previous years
2025
Rubaud	Hamlet's Night	Tax For Max
2024
Rubaud	Brentford Hope	Aspire Tower
2023
Rubaud	Hansard	Glorious Zoff
2022
Knappers Hill	Sceau Royal	Knight Salute
2021
Sceau Royal	Teqany	Belfast Banter

2020-2011
2020
Sceau Royal	Teqany	Diego Du Charmil
2019
Fusil Raffles	Grand Sancy	Beat The Judge
2018
Verdana Blue	If The Cap Fits	We Have A Dream
2017
London Prize	Lough Derg Spirit	Flying Tiger
2016
Sceau Royal	Rayvin Black	Aristo Du Plessis
2015
Irving	Melodic Rendezvous	Zarib
2014
Purple Bay	Bertimont	Rock on Ruby
2013
Melodic Rendezvous	Far West	Ahyaknowyerself
2012
Zarkandar	Prospect Wells	Balder Succes
2011
Celestial Halo	Aine's Delight	Act of Kalanisi

2010-2001
2010
Nearby	Tito Bustillo	Dee Ee Williams
2009
Celestial Halo	Mamlook	Whiteoak
2008
Chomba Womba	Takeroc	Katchit
2007
Kings Quay	Chivalry	Poquelin
2006
Crow Wood	Desert Quest	Royal Shakespeare
2005
Royal Shakespeare	Intersky Falcon	Darrias
2004
Perouse	Chief Yeoman	Howle Hill
2003
Well Chief	Quazar	Castleshane
2002
Santenay	Castleshane	Quazar
2001
Azertyuiop	Milligan	Ulundi

2000-1992
2000
Mister Morose	Seebald	Solo Mio
1999
Wahiba Sands	Chai-Yo	Krabloonik
1998
Grey Shot	Bellator	Dreams End
1997
Pridwell	Mr Percy	Sport Of Fools
1996
Dreams End	Space Trucker	Ground Nut
1995
Atours	Clifton Beat	Absalom's Lady
1994
Valfinet	Jazilah	Oh So Risky
1992
Morley Street	Granville Again	Oh So Risky

The Molyneux Hurdle is a Grade 2 National Hunt hurdle race in Great Britain which is open to horses aged four years or older. It is run at Aintree over a distance of about two miles and one furlong (2m 209y), and during its running there are nine hurdles to be jumped. The race is scheduled to take place each year in early November.

The event was established in 1992, and it was initially held at Cheltenham. It was originally contested over 2m ½f. It was transferred to Wincanton and cut to 1m 7f in 1994. The race was run as a limited handicap between 1998 and 2017 before reverting to a weight for age conditions race from 2018. In 2026, the race was renamed to the Molyneux Hurdle and transferred to Aintree, to be run on the same weekend as before.

== Records ==
Most successful horse (3 wins):

- Sceau Royal - 2016, 2020, 2021
- Ruband - 2023, 2024, 2025

Leading jockey (5 wins):

- Daryl Jacob – Celestial Halo (2011), Zarkandar (2012), Sceau Royal (2016, 2020,2021), Fusil Raffles (2019)
- Harry Cobden - Knappers Hill (2022), Ruband (2023, 2024, 2025), Alexi (2026)

Leading trainer (11 wins):

- Paul Nicholls – Azertyuiop (2001), Santenay (2002), Perouse (2004), Celestial Halo (2009, 2011), Zarkandar (2012), Irving (2015), Knappers Hill (2022), Rubaud (2023, 2024, 2025)

== Winners ==
- Weights given in stones and pounds.

Year	Winner	Age	Weight	Jockey	Trainer
1992	Morley Street	8	11-08	Richard Dunwoody	Toby Balding
	no race 1993
1994	Valfinet	7	11-02	Richard Dunwoody	Martin Pipe
1995	Atours	7	11-02	Paul Holley	David Elsworth
1996	Dreams End	8	10–12	Rodney Farrant	Peter Bowen
1997	Pridwell	7	11-06	Tony McCoy	Martin Pipe
1998	Grey Shot	6	10-03	Jamie Osborne	Ian Balding
1999	Wahiba Sands	6	11-07	Tony McCoy	Martin Pipe
2000	Mister Morose	10	11-10	Carl Llewellyn	Nigel Twiston-Davies
2001	Azertyuiop	4	11-10	Timmy Murphy	Paul Nicholls
2002	Santenay	4	11-07	Timmy Murphy	Paul Nicholls
2003	Well Chief	4	10-05	Jamie Moore	Martin Pipe
2004	Perouse	6	10-05	Christian Williams	Paul Nicholls
2005	Royal Shakespeare	6	11-01	Graham Lee	Steve Gollings
2006	Crow Wood	7	10-01	Dougie Costello	John Quinn
2007	Kings Quay	5	11-09	Dougie Costello	John Quinn
2008	Chomba Womba	7	10-06	Barry Geraghty	Nicky Henderson
2009	Celestial Halo	5	11-10	Ruby Walsh	Paul Nicholls
2010	Nearby	6	10-05	Chris Davies	Philip Hobbs
2011	Celestial Halo	7	11-10	Daryl Jacob	Paul Nicholls
2012	Zarkandar	5	11-10	Daryl Jacob	Paul Nicholls
2013	Melodic Rendezvous	7	11-10	Nick Scholfield	Jeremy Scott
2014	Purple Bay	5	10–11	Mikey Ennis	John Ferguson
2015	Irving	7	11–10	Nick Scholfield	Paul Nicholls
2016	Sceau Royal	4	11-10	Daryl Jacob	Alan King
2017	London Prize	6	10-09	Tom O'Brien	Ian Williams
2018	Verdana Blue	6	10-11	Jeremiah McGrath	Nicky Henderson
2019	Fusil Raffles	4	11-03	Daryl Jacob	Nicky Henderson
2020	Sceau Royal	8	11-00	Daryl Jacob	Alan King
2021	Sceau Royal	9	11-06	Daryl Jacob	Alan King
2022	Knappers Hill	6	11–02	Harry Cobden	Paul Nicholls
2023	Rubaud	5	11–08	Harry Cobden	Paul Nicholls
2024	Rubaud	6	11-08	Harry Cobden	Paul Nicholls
2025	Rubaud	7	11-08	Harry Cobden	Paul Nicholls
2026	Alexi	6	11-04	Harry Cobden	Joe Tizzard

== See also ==
- Horse racing in Great Britain
- List of British National Hunt races
