= Ascot Gold Cup =

U.K. horse race

Coordinates: 51°24′43.8″N 0°40′45.3″W

Gold Cup
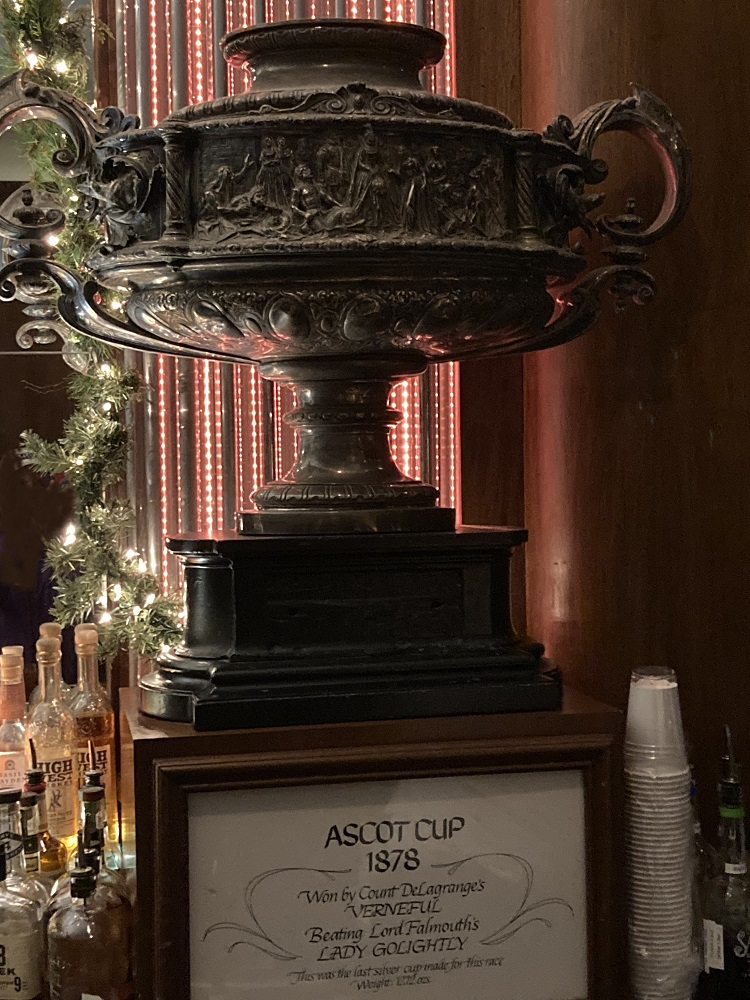
- 1878 Ascot Cup Trophy
- Class: Group 1
- Location: Ascot Racecourse; Ascot, England
- Inaugurated: 1807
- Race type: Flat / Thoroughbred
- Website: Ascot

Race information
- Distance: 2m 3f 210y (4,014 metres)
- Surface: Turf
- Track: Right-handed
- Qualification: Four-years-old and up
- Weight: 9 st 3 lb (4yo); 9 st 4 lb (5yo+); Allowances; 3 lb for fillies and mares 7 lb for S. Hemisphere 4yo horses
- Purse: £650,000 (2025); 1st: £368,615

Gold Cup
2026
Scandinavia	Trawlerman	Sweet William

Previous years
2025
Trawlerman	Illinois	Dubai Future
2024
Kyprios	Trawlerman	Sweet William
2023
Courage Mon Ami	Coltrane	Subjectivist
2022
Kyprios	Mojo Star	Stradivarius
2021
Subjectivist	Princess Zoe	Spanish Mission

2020-2011
2020
Stradivarius	Nayef Road	Cross Counter
2019
Stradivarius	Dee Ex Bee	Master Of Reality
2018
Stradivarius	Vazirabad	Torcedor
2017
Big Orange	Order Of St George	Harbour Law
2016
Order Of St George	Mizzou	Sheikhzayedroad
2015
Trip To Paris	Kingfisher	Forgotten Rules
2014
Leading Light	Estimate	Missunited
2013
Estimate	Simenon	Top Trip
2012
Colour Vision	Opinion Poll	Saddler's Rock
2011
Fame And Glory	Opinion Poll	Brigantin

2010–2001
2010
Rite Of Passage	Age Of Aquarius	Purple Moon
2009
Yeats	Patkai	Geordieland
2008
Yeats	Geordieland	Coastal Path
2007
Yeats	Geordieland	Le Miracle
2006
Yeats	Reefscape	Distinction
2005
Westerner	Distinction	Vinnie Roe
2004
Papineau	Westerner	Darasim
2003
Mr Dinos	Persian Punch	Pole Star
2002
Royal Rebel	Vinnie Roe	Wareed
2001
Royal Rebel	Persian Punch	Jardines Lookout

2000–1991
2000
Kayf Tara	Far Cry	Compton Ace
1999
Enzeli	Invermark	Kayf Tara
1998
Kayf Tara	Double Trigger	Three Cheers
1997
Celeric	Classic Cliche	Election Day
1996
Classic Cliche	Double Trigger	Nononito
1995
Double Trigger	Moonax	Admiral's Well
1994
Arcadian Heights	Vintage Crop	Sonus
1993
Drum Taps	Assessor	Turgeon
1992
Drum Taps	Arcadian Heights	Turgeon
1991
Indian Queen	Arzanni	Warm Feeling

1990–1981
1990
Ashal	Tyrone Bridge	Thethingaboutitis
1989
Sadeem	Mazzacano	Lauries Crusador
1988
Sadeem	Sergeyevich	Chauve Souris
1987
Paean	Sadeem	Saronicos
1986
Longboat	Eastern Mystic	Spicy Story
1985
Gildoran	Longboat	Destroyer
1984
Gildoran	Ore	Condell
1983
Little Wolf	Khairpour	Indian Prince
1982
Ardross	Tipperary Fixer	El Badr
1981
Ardross	Shoot A Line	Ayyabaan

1980–1971
1980
Le Moss	Ardross	Vincent
1979
Le Moss	Buckskin	Arapahos
1978
Shangamuzo	Royal Hive	Hawkberry
1977
Sagaro	Buckskin	Citoyen
1976
Sagaro	Crash Course	Sea Anchor
1975
Sagaro	Le Bavard	Kambalda
1974
Ragstone	Proverb	Lassalle
1973
Lassalle	Celtic Cone	The Admiral
1972
Erimo Hawk	Rock Roi	Irvine
1971
Rock Roi	Random Shot	Orosio

The Gold Cup is a Group 1 flat horse race in Great Britain open to horses aged four years or older. It is run at Ascot over a distance of 2 miles 3 furlongs and 210 yards (4,014 metres), and it is scheduled to take place each year in June.

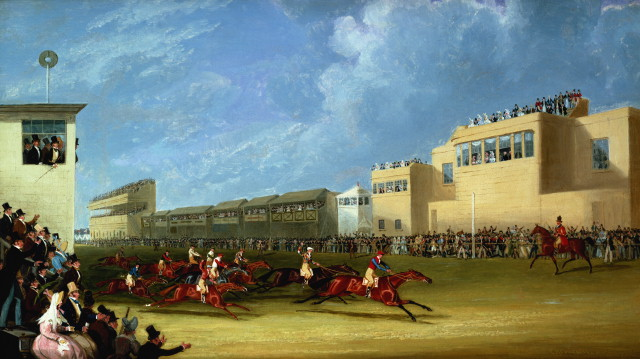
The Ascot Gold Cup, 1834 by James Pollard

It is Britain's most prestigious event for "stayers" – horses which specialise in racing over long distances. It is traditionally held on the third day of the Royal Ascot meeting, which is known colloquially (but not officially) as Ladies' Day. Contrary to popular belief, the actual title of the race does not include the word "Ascot".

== History ==
The event was established in 1807, and it was originally open to horses aged three or older. The inaugural winner, Master Jackey, was awarded prize money of 100 guineas. The first race took place in the presence of King George III and Queen Charlotte.

The 1844 running was attended by Nicholas I of Russia, who was making a state visit to England. That year's winner was unnamed at the time of his victory, but he was given the name "The Emperor" in honour of the visiting monarch. In return Nicholas offered a new trophy for the race — the "Emperor's Plate" — and this became the title of the event for a short period. Its original name was restored after nine years, during the Crimean War.

It was taken by thieves on 18 June 1907. The theft was never solved, but a replacement was finished by August. Mark Twain, the American humorist, came to London about that time, and was much amused by the twin headlines appearing in The Times:

MARK TWAIN ARRIVES

ASCOT GOLD CUP STOLEN

The Gold Cup is the first leg of Britain's Stayers' Triple Crown, followed by the Goodwood Cup and the Doncaster Cup. The last horse to win all three races in the same year was Stradivarius in 2019.

The Gold Cup is one of three perpetual trophies at the Royal Ascot meeting, along with the Royal Hunt Cup and the Queen's Vase, which can be kept permanently by the winning owners. A number of horses have won it more than once, and the most successful is Yeats, who recorded his fourth victory in 2009.

== Records ==
Most successful horse (4 wins):

- Yeats – 2006, 2007, 2008, 2009

Other multiple winners: 3 wins

- Sagaro – 1975, 1976, 1977
- Stradivarius – 2018, 2019, 2020

Other multiple winners: 2 wins

- Anticipation – 1816, 1819
- Bizarre – 1824, 1825
- Touchstone – 1836, 1837
- The Emperor – 1844, 1845
- The Hero – 1847, 1848
- Fisherman – 1858, 1859
- Isonomy – 1879, 1880
- The White Knight – 1907, 1908
- Prince Palatine – 1912, 1913
- Invershin – 1928, 1929
- Trimdon – 1931, 1932
- Fighting Charlie – 1965, 1966
- Le Moss – 1979, 1980
- Ardross – 1981, 1982
- Gildoran – 1984, 1985
- Sadeem – 1988, 1989
- Drum Taps – 1992, 1993
- Kayf Tara – 1998, 2000
- Royal Rebel – 2001, 2002
- Kyprios - 2022, 2024

Leading jockey (11 wins):

- Lester Piggott – Zarathustra (1957), Gladness (1958), Pandofell (1961), Twilight Alley (1963), Fighting Charlie (1965), Sagaro (1975, 1976, 1977), Le Moss (1979), Ardross (1981, 1982)

Leading trainer (10 wins):

- Aidan O'Brien – Yeats (2006, 2007, 2008, 2009), Fame and Glory (2011), Leading Light (2014), Order of St George (2016), Kyprios (2022,2024), Scandinavia (2026)

Leading owner (10 wins): (includes part ownership)

- Sue Magnier – Yeats (2006, 2007, 2008, 2009), Fame and Glory (2011), Leading Light (2014), Order of St George (2016), Kyprios (2022,2024), Scandinavia (2026)

== Winners ==
Year	Winner	Age	Jockey	Trainer	Owner	Time
1807	Master Jackey	3			Mr Durand	
1808	Brighton	4			Mr Fermor	
1809	Anderida	4			Gen Gower	
1810	Loiterer	4			Lord Lowther	
1811	Jannette (Note: Smallhopes won in 1811, but was disqualified as his owner had failed to pay the entry fee)	4			Mr F Craven	
1812	Flash	3			Lord Lowther	
1813	Lutzen	4			Mr Trevanion	
1814	Pranks	5			Mr Batson	
1815	Aladdin	5			Duke of York	
1816	Anticipation	4			Mr Thornhill	
1817	Sir Richard	4			Mr Blake	
1818	Belville	7			Lord Darlington	
1819	Anticipation	7			Mr Goddard	
1820	Champignon	4			T A Fraser	
1821	Banker	5		W Butler	Duke of York	
1822	Sir Huldibrand	4			J Ramsbottom	
1823	Marcellus	4	Will Wheatley	William Chifney	Lord Darlington	
1824	Bizarre	4	Bill Arnull	Dixon Boyce	Lord George Cavendish	
1825	Bizarre	5	Bill Arnull	Dixon Boyce	Lord George Cavendish	
1826	Chateau Margaux	4	George Dockeray	R Stephenson	C Wyndham	
1827	Memnon	5	Sam Chifney Jr.	William Chifney	Earl of Darlington	
1828	Bobadilla	3	Thomas Lye	Robert Pettit	A Molony	
1829	Zinganee	4	Sam Chifney Jr.	William Chifney	6th Earl of Chesterfield	
1830	Lucetta	4	Jem Robinson	H Scott	Sir Mark Wood, 2nd Baronet	
1831	Cetus	4	Jem Robinson	H Scott	Sir Mark Wood, 2nd Baronet	
1832	Camarine	4	Jem Robinson	H Scott	Sir Mark Wood, 2nd Baronet	
1833	Galata	4	Bill Arnull	Charles Marson	2nd Marquess of Exeter	
1834	Glaucus	4	William Scott	John Scott	6th Earl of Chesterfield	
1835	Glencoe	4	Jem Robinson	James Edwards	5th Earl of Jersey	
1836	Touchstone	5	John Barham Day	John Scott	1st Marquess of Westminster	
1837	Touchstone	6	William Scott	John Scott	1st Marquess of Westminster	
1838	Grey Momus	3	William Day	John Barham Day	Lord George Bentinck	
1839	Caravan	5	Jem Robinson	Isaac Day	Isaac Day	
1840	St Francis	5	Sam Chifney Jr.	Robert Pettit	Robert Pettit	
1841	Lanercost	6	William Noble	William I'Anson	W Ramsay	
1842	Beeswing	9	D Cartwright		William Orde	
1843	Ralph	5	Jem Robinson	W Edwards	4th Earl of Albemarle	
1844	The Emperor	3	George Whitehouse	W Edwards	4th Earl of Albemarle	
1845	The Emperor	4	George Whitehouse	W Edwards	4th Earl of Albemarle	
1846	Alarm	4	Nat Flatman	Montgomery Dilly	Charles Greville	
1847	The Hero	4	Alfred Day	John Barham Day	John Barham Day	
1848	The Hero	5	Alfred Day	John Barham Day	John Barham Day	
1849	Van Tromp	5	Charles Marlow	John Fobert	13th Earl of Eglinton	
1850	The Flying Dutchman	4	Charles Marlow	John Fobert	13th Earl of Eglinton	
1851	Woolwich	5	Job Marson	John Scott	A Campbell	
1852	Joe Miller	3	George Mann	William Day	Mr Farrance	
1853	Teddington	5	Job Marson	Alec Taylor Sr.	John Massey Stanley	
1854	West Australian	4	Alfred Day	John Scott	1st Baron Londesborough	
1855	Fandango	3	Tommy Ashmall	George Abdale	2nd Earl of Zetland	
1856	Winkfield	5	James Bartholomew	S Death	S Walker	
1857	Skirmisher	3	John Charlton	George Abdale	2nd Earl of Zetland	
1858	Fisherman	5	John Wells	T Parr	J B Starkey	
1859	Fisherman	6	William Cresswell	T Parr	F Higgins	
1860	Rupee	3	Harry Grimshaw	Jos Dawson	7th Earl of Stamford	
1861	Thormanby	4	Harry Custance	Mathew Dawson	James Merry	
1862	Asteroid	4	John Wells	G Manning	Sir Joseph Hawley	
1863	Buckstone	4	Arthur Edwards	Mathew Dawson	James Merry	
1864	Scottish Chief	3	Harvey Covey	Mathew Dawson	James Merry	
1865	Ely	4	Harry Custance	Tom Olliver	W S Cartwright	
1866	Gladiateur	4	Harry Grimshaw	Tom Jennings	Frédéric de Lagrange	
1867	Lecturer	4	George Fordham	John Day	4th Marquess of Hastings	
1868	Blue Gown	3	James Cameron	John Porter	Sir Joseph Hawley	
1869	Brigantine	3	F Butler	William Day	Sir Frederick Johnstone	
1870	Sabinus	3	Robert Rowell		J G Hessey	
1871	Mortemer	6	George Fordham	Tom Jennings	C. J. Lefevre	
1872	Henry	4	George Fordham	Tom Jennings	C. J. Lefevre	
1873	Cremorne	4	Charles Maidment	William Gilbert	Henry Savile	
1874	Boiard	4	William Carver		Henri Delamarre	
1875	Doncaster	5	George Fordham	Robert Peck	James Merry	
1876	Apology	5	John Osborne Jr.	John Osborne	Mr Seabrook	
1877	Petrarch	4	Tom Cannon	Joseph Cannon	4th Earl of Lonsdale	
1878	Verneuil	4	Jem Goater	Tom Jennings	Frédéric de Lagrange	
1879	Isonomy	4	Tom Cannon	John Porter	Frederick Gretton	
1880	Isonomy	5	Tom Cannon	John Porter	Frederick Gretton	
1881	Robert the Devil	4	Tom Cannon	Charles Blanton	Charles Brewer	
1882	Foxhall	4	Tom Cannon	William Day	James R. Keene	
1883	Tristan	5	George Fordham	Tom Jennings	C. J. Lefevre	
1884	St. Simon	3	Charles Wood	Mathew Dawson	6th Duke of Portland	
1885	St. Gatien	4	Charles Wood	James Waugh	Jack Hammond	
1886	Althorp	4	Tom Cannon	John Porter	Maurice de Hirsch	
1887	Bird of Freedom	5	Billy Warne	J Ryan	D Baird	
1888	Timothy	4	Jack Robinson	James Jewitt	Harry McCalmont	
1889	Trayles	4	Jack Robinson	James Jewitt	W de la Rue	
1890	Gold	4	Frederic Webb	Tom Jennings	Prince Soltykoff	
1891	Morion	4	John Watts	Richard Marsh	Lord Hartington	
1892	Buccaneer	4	George Barrett	S Pickering	Lord Rosslyn	
1893	Marcion	3	Seth Chandley	W Matthews	R C Vyner	
1894	La Fleche	5	John Watts	Richard Marsh	Maurice de Hirsch	
1895	Isinglass	5	Tommy Loates	James Jewitt	Harry McCalmont	
1896	Love Wisely	3	Sam Loates	Alec Taylor Jr.	William Bass	
1897	Persimmon	4	John Watts	Richard Marsh	Prince of Wales	
1898	Elf	5	E Watkins	Richard Count	Jacques de Brémond	4:30.40
1899	Cyllene	4	Sam Loates	William Jarvis	Sir Charles Rose	4:29.40
1900	Merman	8	Tod Sloan	Jack Robinson	Mr. Jersey	4:29.60
1901	Santoi	4	Fred Rickaby	Wallace Davis	George Edwardes	4:39.00
1902	William the Third	4	Morny Cannon	John Porter	6th Duke of Portland	4:32.00
1903	Maximum	4	Archie McIntyre	Richard Count	Jacques de Brémond	
1904	Throwaway	5	Willie Lane	Herbert Braime	Fred Alexander	4:43.40
1905	Zinfandel	5	Morny Cannon	Charles Beatty	8th Baron Howard de Walden	4:23.60
1906	Bachelor's Button	7	Danny Maher	Charles Peck	Solomon Joel	4:23.20
1907	The White Knight	4	William Halsey	Harry Sadler	Tom Kirkwood	4:31.80
1908	The White Knight	5	William Halsey	Harry Sadler	Tom Kirkwood	
1909	Bomba	3	Freddie Fox	Fred Pratt	Jimmy de Rothschild	4:28.40
1910	Bayardo	4	Danny Maher	Alec Taylor Jr.	Alfred W. Cox	
1911	Willonyx	4	William Higgs	Sam Darling	Charles Howard	4:48.20
1912	Prince Palatine	4	Frank O'Neill	Henry Beardsley	Thomas Pilkington	4:27.60
1913	Prince Palatine	5	William Saxby	Henry Beardsley	Thomas Pilkington	4:22.60
1914	Aleppo	5	Freddie Fox	Alec Taylor Jr.	Alfred W. Cox	4:25.40
1915	Apothecary	3	Edward Lancaster	Fred Pratt		3:32.80
1917	Gay Crusader (Note: The race was run at Newmarket during the wartime periods of 1917–18 and 1941–44)	3	Steve Donoghue	Alec Taylor Jr.	Alfred W. Cox	
1918	Gainsborough	3	Joe Childs	Alec Taylor Jr.	Lady James Douglas	
1919	By Jingo!	5	George Hulme	James Rhodes	W T de Pledge	4:33.00
1920	Tangiers	4	George Hulme	Richard Dawson	Sir William Nelson	4:23.80
1921	Periosteum	4	Frank Bullock	Basil Jarvis	Ben Irish	4:22.00
1922	Golden Myth	4	Charlie Elliott	Jack Jarvis	Sir George Bullough	4:17.00
1923	Happy Man	7	Victor Smyth	Thomas Hogg	F Hardy	4:20.80
1924	Massine	4	Fred Sharpe	Elijah Cunnington	Henri Ternynck	4:36.60
1925	Santorb	4	Steve Donoghue	James Rhodes	A Barclay-Walker	4:31.40
1926	Solario	4	Joe Childs	Reg Day	Sir John Rutherford	4:45.20
1927	Foxlaw	5	Brownie Carslake	Reg Day	Sir Abe Bailey	4:29.60
1928	Invershin	6	Brownie Carslake	George Digby	John Reid Walker	4:34.20
1929	Invershin	7	Richard Perryman	George Digby	John Reid Walker	4:24.80
1930	Bosworth	4	Tommy Weston	Frank Butters	17th Earl of Derby	5:05.00
1931	Trimdon	5	Joe Childs	Joseph Lawson	Charles Lambton	4:40.60
1932	Trimdon	6	Joe Childs	Joseph Lawson	Charles Lambton	4:44.20
1933	Foxhunter	4	Harry Wragg	Jack Jarvis	Edward Esmond	4:22.60
1934	Felicitation	4	Gordon Richards	Frank Butters	Aga Khan III	4:24.40
1935	Tiberius	4	Tommy Weston	Joseph Lawson	Sir Abe Bailey	4:34.80
1936	Quashed	4	Richard Perryman	Colledge Leader	Lord Stanley	4:33.60
1937	Precipitation	4	Patrick Beasley	Cecil Boyd-Rochfort	Lady Zia Wernher	4:18.80
1938	Flares	5	Bobby Jones	Cecil Boyd-Rochfort	William Woodward Sr.	4:19.40
1939	Flyon	4	Eph Smith	Jack Jarvis	1st Baron Milford	4:28.20
	no race 1940					
1941	Finis	6	Harry Wragg	Ossie Bell	Sir Hugo Cunliffe-Owen	4:03.00
1942	Owen Tudor	4	Gordon Richards	Fred Darling	Catherine Macdonald-Buchanan	4:04.00
1943	Ujiji	4	Gordon Richards	Joseph Lawson	Alfred Allnatt	3:51.00
1944	Umiddad	4	Gordon Richards	Frank Butters	Aga Khan III	
1945	Ocean Swell	4	Eph Smith	Jack Jarvis	6th Earl of Rosebery	4:36.60
1946	Caracalla	4	Charlie Elliott	Charles Semblat	Marcel Boussac	4:41.20
1947	Souverain	4	Marcel Lollierou	Henri Delavaud	F. R. Schmitt	4:31.60
1948	Arbar	4	Charlie Elliott	Charles Semblat	Marcel Boussac	4:27.80
1949	Alycidon	4	Doug Smith	Walter Earl	18th Earl of Derby	4:19.20
1950	Supertello	4	Doug Smith	John Waugh	Wilfred Harvey	4:25.00
1951	Pan	4	Roger Poincelet	Etienne Pollet	Eugène Constant	4:22.40
1952	Aquino	4	Gordon Richards	Sam Armstrong	Maharanee of Baroda	4:29.60
1953	Souepi	5	Charlie Elliott	George Digby	George Digby	4:35.20
1954	Elpenor	4	Jacques Doyasbère	Charlie Elliott	Marcel Boussac	4:32.80
1955	Botticelli	4	Enrico Camici	Enrico della Rocchetta	Mario della Rocchetta	4:29.02
1956	Macip	4	Serge Boullenger	Charlie Elliott	Marcel Boussac	4:48.80
1957	Zarathustra	6	Lester Piggott	Cecil Boyd-Rochfort	Terence Gray	4:23.93
1958	Gladness	5	Lester Piggott	Vincent O'Brien	John McShain	4:30.18
1959	Wallaby	4	Freddie Palmer	Percy Carter	Geoffroy de Waldner	4:34.02
1960	Sheshoon	4	George Moore	Alec Head	Prince Aly Khan	4:28.42
1961	Pandofell	4	Lester Piggott	Freddie Maxwell	H. Warwick Daw	4:30.32
1962	Balto	4	Freddie Palmer	Max Bonaventure	André Rueff	4:48.04
1963	Twilight Alley	4	Lester Piggott	Noel Murless	Lady Sassoon	4:52.95
	no race 1964, course waterlogged (Note: The race was abandoned in 1964 because of waterlogging)					
1965	Fighting Charlie	4	Lester Piggott	Freddie Maxwell	Lady Mairi Bury	4:34.47
1966	Fighting Charlie	5	Greville Starkey	Freddie Maxwell	Lady Mairi Bury	4:34.56
1967	Parbury	4	Joe Mercer	Derrick Candy	Herbert Holt	4:36.05
1968	Pardallo	5	Bill Pyers	Mick Bartholomew	Suzy Volterra	4:35.84
1969	Levmoss	4	Bill Williamson	Seamus McGrath	Seamus McGrath	4:25.60
1970	Precipice Wood	4	Jimmy Lindley	Rosemary Lomax	Bobby McAlpine	4:27.35
1971	Random Shot (Note: Rock Roi finished first in 1971 and 1972, but he was disqualified both times)	4	Geoff Lewis	Arthur Budgett	Mrs G. Benskin	4:41.39
1972	Erimo Hawk	4	Pat Eddery	Geoffrey Barling	Y. Yamamoto	4:28.69
1973	Lassalle	4	Jimmy Lindley	Richard Carver Jr.	Zenya Yoshida	4:33.46
1974	Ragstone	4	Ron Hutchinson	John Dunlop	16th Duke of Norfolk	4:35.01
1975	Sagaro	4	Lester Piggott	François Boutin	Gerry Oldham	4:48.60
1976	Sagaro	5	Lester Piggott	François Boutin	Gerry Oldham	4:26.15
1977	Sagaro	6	Lester Piggott	François Boutin	Gerry Oldham	4:28.25
1978	Shangamuzo	5	Greville Starkey	Michael Stoute	Mrs E. Charles	4:27.30
1979	Le Moss	4	Lester Piggott	Henry Cecil	Carlo d'Alessio	4:25.22
1980	Le Moss	5	Joe Mercer	Henry Cecil	Carlo d'Alessio	4:28.40
1981	Ardross	5	Lester Piggott	Henry Cecil	Charles St George	4:51.23
1982	Ardross	6	Lester Piggott	Henry Cecil	Charles St George	4:35.24
1983	Little Wolf	5	Willie Carson	Dick Hern	Lord Porchester	4:24.36
1984	Gildoran	4	Steve Cauthen	Barry Hills	Robert Sangster	4:18.81
1985	Gildoran	5	Brent Thomson	Barry Hills	Robert Sangster	4:25.19
1986	Longboat	5	Willie Carson	Dick Hern	Dick Hollingsworth	4:22.11
1987	Paean	4	Steve Cauthen	Henry Cecil	Lord Howard de Walden	4:33.26
1988	Sadeem (Note: Royal Gait was first in 1988, but he was relegated to last place following a stewards' inquiry)	5	Greville Starkey	Guy Harwood	Sheikh Mohammed	4:15.67
1989	Sadeem	6	Willie Carson	Guy Harwood	Sheikh Mohammed	4:22.68
1990	Ashal	4	Richard Hills	Harry Thomson Jones	Hamdan Al Maktoum	4:28.58
1991	Indian Queen	6	Walter Swinburn	Lord Huntingdon	Sir Gordon Brunton	4:23.90
1992	Drum Taps	6	Frankie Dettori	Lord Huntingdon	Yoshio Asakawa	4:18.29
1993	Drum Taps	7	Frankie Dettori	Lord Huntingdon	Yoshio Asakawa	4:32.57
1994	Arcadian Heights	6	Michael Hills	Geoff Wragg	John Pearce	4:27.67
1995	Double Trigger	4	Jason Weaver	Mark Johnston	Ron Huggins	4:20.25
1996	Classic Cliche	4	Michael Kinane	Saeed bin Suroor	Godolphin	4:23.20
1997	Celeric	5	Pat Eddery	David Morley	Christopher Spence	4:26.19
1998	Kayf Tara	4	Frankie Dettori	Saeed bin Suroor	Godolphin	4:32.36
1999	Enzeli	4	Johnny Murtagh	John Oxx	Aga Khan IV	4:18.85
2000	Kayf Tara	6	Michael Kinane	Saeed bin Suroor	Godolphin	4:24.53
2001	Royal Rebel	5	Johnny Murtagh	Mark Johnston	Peter Savill	4:18.92
2002	Royal Rebel	6	Johnny Murtagh	Mark Johnston	Peter Savill	4:25.64
2003	Mr Dinos	4	Kieren Fallon	Paul Cole	Constantine Shiacolas	4:20.15
2004	Papineau	4	Frankie Dettori	Saeed bin Suroor	Godolphin	4:20.90
2005	Westerner (Note: The 2005 running took place at York)	6	Olivier Peslier	Élie Lellouche	Ecurie Wildenstein	4:19.49
2006	Yeats	5	Kieren Fallon	Aidan O'Brien	Magnier / Nagle	4:20.45
2007	Yeats	6	Michael Kinane	Aidan O'Brien	Magnier / Nagle	4:20.78
2008	Yeats	7	Johnny Murtagh	Aidan O'Brien	Magnier / Nagle	4:21.14
2009	Yeats	8	Johnny Murtagh	Aidan O'Brien	Magnier / Nagle	4:20.73
2010	Rite Of Passage	6	Pat Smullen	Dermot Weld	Dr Ronan Lambe	4:16.92
2011	Fame and Glory	5	Jamie Spencer	Aidan O'Brien	Smith / Magnier et al.	4:37.51
2012	Colour Vision	4	Frankie Dettori	Saeed bin Suroor	Godolphin	4:42.05
2013	Estimate	4	Ryan Moore	Sir Michael Stoute	Queen Elizabeth II	4:20.51
2014	Leading Light	4	Joseph O'Brien	Aidan O'Brien	Smith / Magnier / Tabor	4:21.09
2015	Trip To Paris	4	Graham Lee	Ed Dunlop	La Grange Partnership	4:22.61
2016	Order of St George	4	Ryan Moore	Aidan O'Brien	Smith / Magnier / Tabor	4:26.21
2017	Big Orange	6	James Doyle	Michael Bell	Bill Gredley	4:22.40
2018	Stradivarius	4	Frankie Dettori	John Gosden	Bjorn Nielsen	4:21.08
2019	Stradivarius	5	Frankie Dettori	John Gosden	Bjorn Nielsen	4:30.88
2020	Stradivarius	6	Frankie Dettori	John Gosden	Bjorn Nielsen	4:32.60
2021	Subjectivist	4	Joe Fanning	Mark Johnston	Dr Jim Walker	4:20.28
2022	Kyprios	4	Ryan Moore	Aidan O'Brien	Moyglare Stud / Smith / Magnier / Tabor	4:26.52
2023	Courage Mon Ami	4	Frankie Dettori	John & Thady Gosden	Wathnan Racing	4:20.97
2024	Kyprios	6	Ryan Moore	Aidan O'Brien	Moyglare Stud / Smith / Magnier / Tabor	4:18.06
2025	Trawlerman	7	William Buick	John & Thady Gosden	Godolphin	4:15.02
2026	Scandinavia	4	Ryan Moore	Aidan O'Brien	Tabor / Smith / Magnier	4:18.53

== See also ==
- Horse racing in Great Britain
- List of British flat horse races
