= Henry Custance =

English jockey

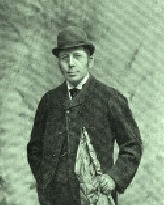
- Henry Custance, starter

Personal information
- Born: 27 February 1842 Peterborough, England
- Died: 19 April 1908 (aged 66) Leicester, England
- Occupations: Jockey and Horseracing Official

Horse racing career
- Sport: Horse racing

Major racing wins
- Major races 1,000 Guineas Stakes (1867); Ascot Gold Cup (1861, 1865); Epsom Derby (1860, 1866, 1874); St Leger (1866)

Significant horses
- Achievement, Ely, George Frederick, Lord Lyon, Thormanby

Henry Custance (27 February 1842 - 19 April 1908) was a British jockey who won the Derby three times in the 1860s and 1870s.

== Riding career ==
Henry was born in Peterborough on 27 February 1842, the son of postman Samuel Custance and his wife Elizabeth Carpenter.

He began riding in pony races at Ramsey, Cambridgeshire at the age of 13, and won a contest for a saddle, when he weighed only four stone. He was unsuccessful finding employment in Newmarket, so moved to Epsom to become apprentice to Ned Smith. There he had, in his own words, "a jolly though rather a rough time".

His first win was at Peterborough on a horse called Ada, owned by George Edwards. His first major success followed in the 1858 Cesarewitch Handicap aboard Rocket, a race he won again in 1861 on Audrey.

He joined the Russley stable in 1859, then under the management of Mathew Dawson and rode over forty winners. For Dawson, he won his first classic, the 1860 Derby, on Thormanby. The horse was well-backed, and Dawson insisted that the jockey switched racing colours at the last minute, to confuse anyone attempting to sabotage the horse's chances on its way down to the start.

The following year, he rode Dundee in the Derby. The horse broke down during the race, but still finished second to Kettledrum. He would have a mount in the Derby for twenty consecutive years.

In 1863, he became stable jockey for James Dover at East Isley.

Custance recorded a second win in the race in 1866 on Lord Lyon, a horse with four white feet who was, according to Custance, "a bit of a whistler". Despite this the horse was remarkably successful. He had won the 2,000 Guineas at odds-on, although Custance had been injured in a fall at Epsom, so R Thomas had taken the ride. He went on to become only the third horse to win the Triple Crown with Custance again riding, when just holding on to win the St Leger.

Custance won the 1867 1,000 Guineas on Achievement and could have added another Derby winner that year as well. He had agreed to ride Hermit but when the horse broke a blood vessel two days beforehand, Custance opted for a different horse. Hermit recovered and won the race, ridden by Johnny Daley. A third victory in the race finally came in 1874 on the ill-tempered George Frederick.

After this point, Custance began struggling with his weight, only being able to make 8st 10lbs. His last winner was Lollypop in the All-Aged Stakes at Newmarket's Houghton meeting in 1879, before his weight battle forced him to retire after 24 years as a jockey.

== Later life ==
Following retirement, Custance worked for ten years as a race starter, and officiated at the 1885 Derby, the only man to have both ridden in and started the race. He held a licence as deputy starter to the Jockey Club and was official starter to the Belgian Jockey Club. He was also starter at The Curragh on 19 October 1886 for Fred Archer's only ride there, only weeks before his death. On noticing the effects of severe wasting, he commented to Archer, "I never saw you look half so bad as you do now." "Well, if I look bad now, how shall I look next Wednesday when I ride St Mirin in the Cambridgeshire?" replied Archer. On the day of the latter race, he contracted a fever from which he subsequently died.

After that, he became the proprietor of The George Inn at Oakham, and rode out with the Quorn and Cottesmore hunts. He published his autobiographical "Riding Recollections and Turf Stories" in 1894, with a dedication to a patron from his riding career, the Duke of Hamilton.

He married Mary, and died of a paralytic seizure at his home, 53 New Walk, Leicester on 19 April 1908. His funeral took place at Oakham on 23 April 1908, and he left an estate of £8,081.6s.2d.

== Riding style and personality ==
Custance was a lightweight jockey. For his Derby win on Thormanby he had to carry 22 lbs of lead in his saddle.

He was close friends with fellow jockey George Fordham, and was best man at his wedding and godfather to his eldest son. In a popular story, he saved Fordham from a losing cricketing bet with a bookmaker by stealing the ball so the match was declared void. He was described as cheerful and amusing.

== Major wins ==
(United Kingdom) Great Britain

- 1,000 Guineas Stakes - Achievement (1867)
- Ascot Gold Cup - (2) - Thormanby (1861), Ely (1865)
- Epsom Derby - (3) - Thormanby (1860), Lord Lyon (1866), George Frederick (1874)
- St Leger - Lord Lyon (1866)

== Bibliography ==
- Tanner, Michael; Cranham, Gerry (1992). Great Jockeys of the Flat. Enfield, Middlesex: Guinness Publishing. ISBN 0-85112-989-7.
