= Azertyuiop (horse) =

French racehorse

- Sire: Baby Turk
- Grandsire: Northern Baby
- Dam: Temara
- Damsire: Rex Magna
- Sex: Gelding
- Foaled: 1997
- Country: France
- Colour: Bay
- Breeder: Pierre de Maleissye Melun
- Owner: John Hales
- Trainer: Paul Nicholls
- Record: 25: 14-5-2
- Earnings: £605,529

Major wins
- Kingwell Hurdle (2001); November Novices' Chase (2002); Arkle Challenge Trophy (2003); Game Spirit Chase (2004), (2005); Queen Mother Champion Chase (2004); Haldon Gold Cup (2004)
- Last updated on October 30, 2007

Azertyuiop was a French-bred National Hunt racehorse, who specialised in two-mile steeplechases. He won the Arkle Challenge Trophy at the 2003 Cheltenham Festival, going on to win the Queen Mother Champion Chase the following year, and then coming home third in the same race in 2005. He was trained by Paul Nicholls and was ridden by Ruby Walsh in every chase bar one. He is owned by John Hales who also owned One Man, who won the 1998 Queen Mother Champion Chase and the 1995 and 1996 King George VI Chase. His name derives from the top row of letters on the French keyboard layout.

== Hurdling ==
Azertyuiop won a hurdle at Auteuil, Paris in October 2000. He then went to Wincanton in February and won the Kingwell Hurdle as a novice. That year's renewal had a slightly substandard look to it. The runner-up Hors La Loi III was in the middle of a poor run of form. Azertyuiop was due to be aimed at the Cheltenham Festival's Triumph Hurdle rather than the Champion Hurdle. However, the 2001 UK foot and mouth crisis ended the hopes of the Festival taking place. In the 2001–02 season, he won one hurdle race, the Elite Hurdle, and was well beaten in his other three races. He started the next season as a novice chaser.

== Chasing ==
Azertyuiop went into the 2003 Arkle Challenge Trophy as a short-priced favourite having won his three novice chases by at least 16 lengths. He won the Arkle by 11 lengths.

In 2003–04, his form was mixed. He unseated Walsh in his first race and then lost to Moscow Flyer in the Tingle Creek Chase. His third race was a defeat to Isio in the Victor Chandler Handicap Chase. However, Azertyuiop was giving away nineteen pounds to the winner and twenty to the others. His Queen Mother Champion Chase prep race was at Newbury in the Game Spirit Chase, and he won by 12 lengths. The scene was set for a meeting at Cheltenham with the reigning Champion Chase winner Moscow Flyer. However, the latter made a terrible mistake at the fourth last fence and unseated Barry Geraghty. Azertyuiop won by 9 lengths from the 2002 champion Flagship Uberalles.

In 2004–05, he won his seasonal reappearance and then lost again to Moscow Flyer in the Tingle Creek Chase. His next race was a bid by his trainer to win the 3 miles King George VI Chase. Azertyuiop's stamina gave out in the latter stages of the race, and he finished third. He then defeated his successor as Arkle Challenge Trophy winner, Well Chief, in retaining the Game Spirit Chase. The scene was set for a battle between him, Moscow Flyer, and Well Chief in the Queen Mother Champion Chase. However, he made a very bad mistake at the water jump. Azertyuiop came in third. He finished the season by finishing second to Well Chief at Sandown in the Betfred Celebration Chase.

Early in the 2005/2006 season, he suffered an injury which kept him off the course. The injury proved to be career ending, and Azertyuiop was retired on 8 September 2006.
