= Frédéric Lagrange (photographer) =

Frédéric Lagrange is a fashion, travel, portrait, and lifestyle photographer.

== Biography ==
Frédéric Lagrange was born in Versailles, France and currently lives in Brooklyn, New York. He launched his photography career in 2001, after working with fashion photographer Nathaniel Goldberg for three years. In the beginning Frédéric focused on travel photography but has since broadened his range to include fashion and portraiture.

== Career ==
Frédéric Lagrange’s work has been featured in publications and such as Avaunt Magazine, Harper’s Bazaar UK, Japanese Vogue, Spanish Vogue, The New Yorker, New York Times "T" magazine, Condé Nast Traveller UK, Vanity Fair, Travel + Leisure, Port Magazine, Departures, Centurion, Tatler, GQ and DestinAsian.

In late Winter 2012, Frédéric traveled to Afghanistan to work on a personal documentary project in the Wakhan Corridor. His subsequent stills and motion documentaries were acclaimed worldwide.

His photography has also been featured in international ad campaigns for Louis Vuitton, Hermès, Walt Disney, Vodafone, Starwood hotels and Aman Resorts.

== Acclaim ==
Frédéric was chosen as Photo District News’ 30 under 30 Photographers to Watch in 2003. His work has also been featured in The American Photography Annual (2008, 2015, 2016) the Society of Publication Designers Annual (2003 and 2008, 2016), and the PDN Photography Annual (2008, 2016) and was awarded the 2016 "Sony Emerging Talent". He is one of 30 photographers sponsored by Kodak worldwide.
