= Gladiateur =

French-bred Thoroughbred racehorse

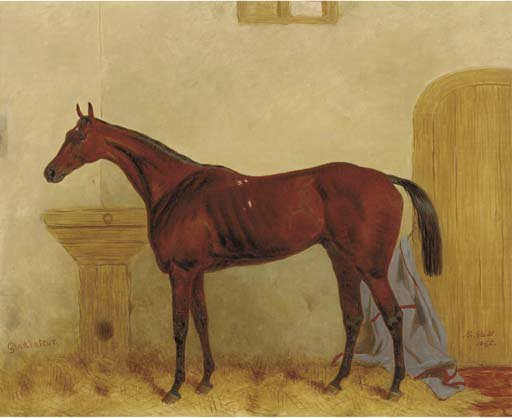
- Gladiateur's portrait by Harry Hall
- Sire: Monarque
- Grandsire: The Emperor
- Dam: Miss Gladiator
- Damsire: Gladiator
- Sex: Stallion
- Foaled: 1862
- Died: 1876 (aged 13–14)
- Country: France
- Colour: Bay
- Breeder: Count Frédéric de Lagrange
- Owner: Count Frédéric de Lagrange
- Trainer: Tom Jennings, Sr.
- Record: 19: 16-0-1
- Earnings: 980,300 FF

Major wins
- 2,000 Guineas (1865); Epsom Derby (1865); St. Leger Stakes (1865); Grand Prix de Paris (1865); Grand Prix du Prince Impérial (1865); Newmarket Derby (1865); Derby Trial Stakes (1866); Claret Stakes (1866); Grand Prix de l'Impératrice (1866); Ascot Gold Cup (1866); La Coupe (1866); Grand Prix de l'Empereur (1866)

Awards
- 2nd U.K. Triple Crown Champion (1865)

Honours
- French Horse Racing Hall of Fame (2025); Life-sized statue at Longchamp Racecourse; Prix Gladiateur at Longchamp Racecourse
- Last updated on 30 September 2011

Gladiateur (1862–1876) was a French Thoroughbred racehorse who won the English Triple Crown in 1865. Gladiateur is called a legend by France Galop and "One of the best horses ever to grace the turf in any century" by the National Sporting Library of Middleburg, Virginia. Gladiateur was not very successful as a sire but his performance on the track remains one of the most impressive in Thoroughbred horse racing history.

== Background ==
A large colt, Gladiateur was a horse who raced best at long distances. He was bred by Count Frederic de Lagrange at his Haras de Dangu at Dangu, Eure in the Upper Normandy region of France. He was sired by the French horse Monarque on Miss Gladiator, a mare by the British horse Gladiator, who had been purchased by French interests at the age of nine and brought to stand at stud in France. Miss Gladiator was also the dam of Villafranca.

== Racing career ==
Gladiateur's owner sent him to England to be trained by Tom Jennings, Sr at Newmarket Racecourse. Developing the colt slowly, he did not begin racing until the autumn of 1864 and won only one of the three races he entered. At age three, things were very different as Gladiateur was the most dominant horse in European racing while becoming the first foreign horse to win the English Triple Crown. After winning the 1865 2,000 Guineas then the most prestigious race in England, The Derby, Gladiateur was sent to race in Paris. In front of happy fans who dubbed him "The Avenger of Waterloo", he easily won the Grand Prix de Paris.

At age four, Gladiateur continued to dominate, winning numerous important races in England and France including a forty-length victory in the Ascot Gold Cup.

== Stud record ==
He was retired to stud duty at the end of his four-year-old season having won sixteen of his nineteen races. He first stood at Middle Park Stud in Kent in 1867 and 1868 and then at his owner's Haras de Dangu in France 1869 and 1870. Following the invasion of France by Germany during the Franco-Prussian War, Count Frederic de Lagrange shipped his horses out of the country to the safety of England where they were sold at a Tattersalls auction. Gladiateur was purchased by an English breeder (William Blenkiron) who brought him back to Middle Park Stud but following his new owner's death, in 1873 he was sold to Dunmow Stud Farm in Essex. He was the sire of Fair Maid of Kent, dam of Kentish Fire (IRE) who won the Irish Derby Stakes and Frigate, a Grand National Steeplechase winner.

Suffering from a disease of the navicular bone, Gladiateur was euthanized in January 1876. He is buried at Dunmow Stud Farm but his tail is at the National Horseracing Museum in Newmarket.
