= Celebration Chase =

Steeplechase horse race in Britain

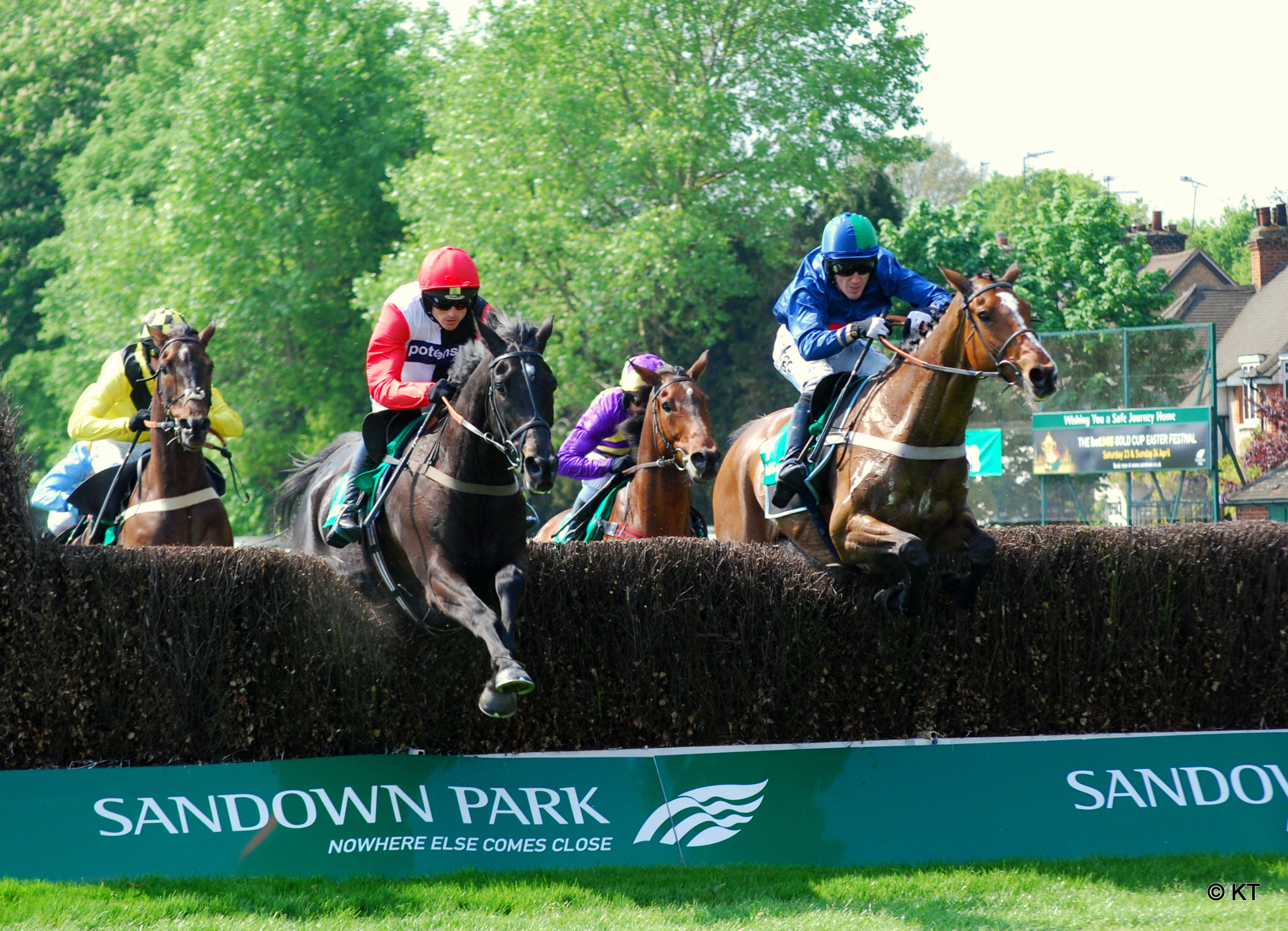
- The 2011 running won by French Opera, the rightmost horse in this image
- Class: Grade One
- Location: Sandown Park; Esher, England
- Inaugurated: 2001
- Race type: Steeplechase
- Sponsor: Bet365
- Website: Sandown Park

Race information
- Distance: 1m 7f 99yd (3,108 metres)
- Surface: Turf
- Track: Right-handed
- Qualification: Five-years-old and up
- Weight: 11 st 10 lb Allowances; 7 lb for mares
- Purse: £175,000 (2025); 1st: £99,663

Celebration Chase
2026
Edwardstone	JPR One	Solness

Previous years
2025
Il Etait Temps	Jonbon	Energumene
2024
Jonbon	El Fabiolo	Edwardstone
2023
Jonbon	Captain Guinness	Greaneteen
2022
Greaneteen	Sceau Royal	Nube Negra
2021
Greaneteen	Altior	Sceau Royal

2020-2011
2019
Altior	Sceau Royal	God's Own
2018
Altior	San Benedeto	God's Own
2017
Altior	Special Tiara	San Benedeto
2016
Sprinter Sacre	Un De Sceaux	Dodging Bullets
2015
Special Tiara	Sprinter Sacre	Mr Mole
2014
Sire De Grugy	Pepite Rose	Special Tiara
2013
Sire De Grugy	Finian's Rainbow	Wishfull Thinking
2012
Sanctuaire	Somersby	Dan Breen
2011
French Opera	Chaninbar	Cornas

2010-2001
2010
I'm So Lucky	Oiseau de Nuit	Twist Magic
2009
Twist Magic	Kalahari King	Mahogany Blaze
2008
Andreas	Lord Henry	Fiepes Shuffle
2007
Dempsey	Hoo La Baloo	Tysou
2006
River City	Nyrche	Contraband
2005
Well Chief	Azertyuiop	Contraband
2004
Cenkos	Impek	Got One Too
2003
Seebald	Cenkos	Wahiba Sands
2002
Cenkos	Flagship Uberalles	Edredon Bleu
2001
Edredon Bleu	Fadalko	Desert Mountain

The Celebration Chase is a Grade One National Hunt steeplechase in Great Britain which is open to horses aged five years or older. It is run at Sandown Park over a distance of about 1 mile 7½ furlongs (1 mile, 7 furlongs and 99 yards, or 3,108 metres), and during its running there are thirteen fences to be jumped. The race is scheduled to take place each year in late April.

== History ==
The event has its origins in 2001, when the Cheltenham Festival was cancelled due to a foot-and-mouth crisis. Replacements for some of the Festival's races were held at Sandown in late April, and the equivalent of the Queen Mother Champion Chase was a Grade 1 event called the Championship Chase.

The following year the race returned as the Queen Elizabeth the Queen Mother Celebration Chase, in memory of the Queen Mother (1900–2002), who frequently attended racing at Sandown. The event was downgraded to Class B level, but it continued to attract high quality chasers. It was promoted to Grade Two status in 2005, and at this point its title was shortened to the Celebration Chase.

The race is currently sponsored by Bet365, and it takes place at a meeting which features both jump and flat races. Other events at this meeting include the Bet365 Gold Cup, the Gordon Richards Stakes and the Sandown Mile. The Celebration Chase was upgraded to Grade One by the British Horseracing Board from its 2014 running.

== Records ==
Most successful horse (3 wins):

- Altior - 2017, 2018, 2019

Leading jockey (5 wins):

- Nico de Boinville - Sprinter Sacre (2016), Altior (2017, 2018, 2019), Jonbon (2024)

Leading trainer (7 wins):

- Paul Nicholls – Cenkos (2002, 2004), Andreas (2008), Twist Magic (2009), Sanctuaire (2012), Greaneteen (2021,2022)
- Nicky Henderson - French Opera (2011), Sprinter Sacre (2016), Altior (2017, 2018, 2019), Jonbon (2023, 2024)

== Winners ==
Year	Winner	Age	Jockey	Trainer
2001	Edredon Bleu	9	Tony McCoy	Henrietta Knight
2002	Cenkos	8	Barry Geraghty	Paul Nicholls
2003	Seebald	8	Tony McCoy	Martin Pipe
2004	Cenkos	10	Barry Geraghty	Paul Nicholls
2005	Well Chief	6	Timmy Murphy	Martin Pipe
2006	River City	9	Tom Doyle	Noel Chance
2007	Dempsey	9	Timmy Murphy	Carl Llewellyn
2008	Andreas	8	Ruby Walsh	Paul Nicholls
2009	Twist Magic	7	Ruby Walsh	Paul Nicholls
2010	I'm So Lucky	8	Tom Scudamore	David Pipe
2011	French Opera	8	Tony McCoy	Nicky Henderson
2012	Sanctuaire	6	Daryl Jacob	Paul Nicholls
2013	Sire De Grugy	7	Jamie Moore	Gary Moore
2014	Sire De Grugy	8	Jamie Moore	Gary Moore
2015	Special Tiara	8	Noel Fehily	Henry de Bromhead
2016	Sprinter Sacre	10	Nico de Boinville	Nicky Henderson
2017	Altior	7	Nico de Boinville	Nicky Henderson
2018	Altior	8	Nico de Boinville	Nicky Henderson
2019	Altior	9	Nico de Boinville	Nicky Henderson
	no race 2020 (Note: The 2020 running was cancelled because of the COVID-19 pandemic in the United Kingdom)
2021	Greaneteen	7	Bryony Frost	Paul Nicholls
2022	Greaneteen	8	Harry Cobden	Paul Nicholls
2023	Jonbon	7	Aidan Coleman	Nicky Henderson
2024	Jonbon	8	Nico de Boinville	Nicky Henderson
2025	Il Etait Temps	7	Danny Mullins	Willie Mullins
2026	Edwardstone	12	Tom Cannon	Alan King

== See also ==
- Horse racing in Great Britain
- List of British National Hunt races
- Recurring sporting events established in 2001 – this race is included under its original title, Championship Chase.
