= Well Chief =

German-bred Thoroughbred racehorse

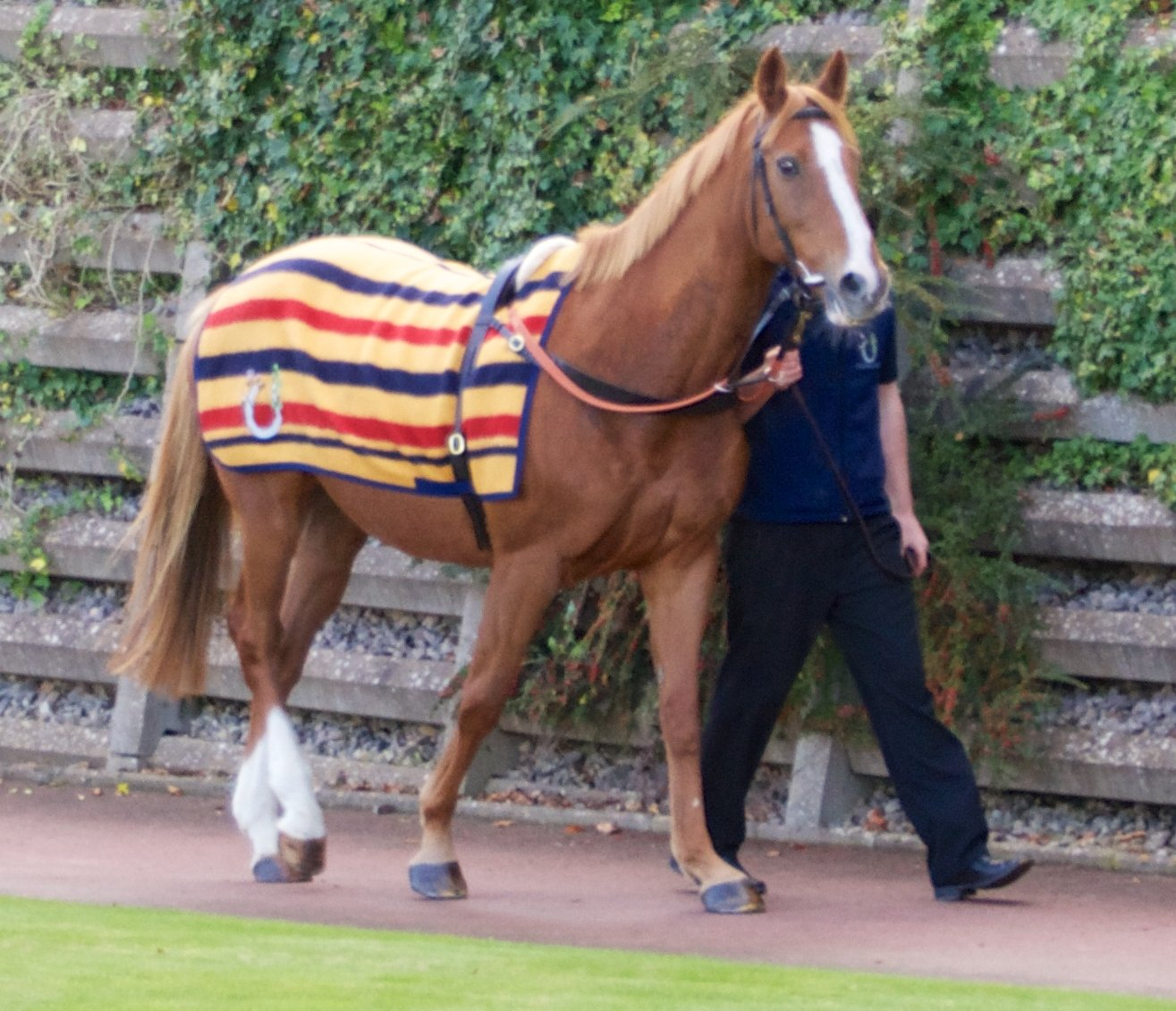
- Sire: Night Shift
- Dam: Wellesiena
- Damsire: Scenic
- Sex: Gelding
- Foaled: 16 April 1999
- Country: Germany
- Colour: Chestnut
- Breeder: Gestut Norina
- Owner: David Johnson
- Trainer: David Pipe
- Record: 23: 10-4-3
- Earnings: £497,691

Major wins
- Adonis Juvenile Novices' Hurdle (2003); Elite Hurdle (2003); Arkle Challenge Trophy (2004); Maghull Novices' Chase (2004); Victor Chandler Chase (2005); Celebration Chase (2005); Game Spirit Chase (2007)

Well Chief was a German-bred race horse who was trained in Britain by David Pipe and owned by David Johnson.

== Early life ==
He started his racing career as a Flat horse in Germany trained by Ralf Suerland and made his debut in a Listed race at Dortmund, which he won. He went on to have 3 more starts for the trainers, 2 of those in Group 3 class and the other in Group 2 class, where he finished 6th, 9th and 7th respectively.

== Owner Change ==
Well Chief was then bought by David Johnson and sent to England to be trained by Martin Pipe. He made his British debut in a maiden hurdle at Taunton in February 2003, where he won by 5 lengths. He was stepped up in class later that month and won the Grade 2 Adonis Juvenile Hurdle at Kempton. In his next start, which was his third over hurdles, Well Chief contested the Triumph Hurdle at the Cheltenham Festival, where he was denied by a head when finishing 2nd to Spectroscope. In his final race of the season, he was sent off a warm 2/1 favourite for the Grade 1 4-Y-O Novices' Hurdle at Aintree in April and finished a 2½ length 3rd to 33/1 winner Le Duc.

== History ==
Well Chief made his reappearance the following season (2003/04) in the Elite Hurdle in November, where he won by just under 2 lengths and shaved 0.2 seconds of the course record which had stood for nearly 9 years. He embarked on a novice chasing campaign in February 2004. After winning a Novices Chase at Taunton, he was stepped up to Grade 1 class at the Cheltenham Festival, where he was sent off a 9/1 shot for the Arkle Challenge Trophy and won by a length from Kicking King. He followed that up with another victory in the Maghull Novices' Chase, which was his final appearance of that season.

He reappeared in 2004/05 season in a Handicap Chase at Cheltenham in November, where he finished a head 2nd to Armaturk. He then contested the Tingle Creek Chase at Sandown, finishing 1½ length 3rd to Moscow Flyer, with Azertyuiop 2nd. After that run, Well Chief was sent off an odds on favourite for the Castleford Chase at Wetherby, in which he fell at the fourth last fence. He resumed winning ways in his next race with a victory in the Victor Chandler Chase. In his next two runs, he finished 2nd to Azertyuiop in the Game Spirit Chase and second behind Moscow Flyer in the Queen Mother Champion Chase. He then got his head in front in the Celebration Chase at Sandown in April, where he beat old rival Azertyuiop.

== Injury ==
Well Chief suffered a severe leg injury, which kept him out for nearly 2 years. He came back from the injury in the 2007 Game Spirit Chase, where he was sent off the 5/2 2nd favourite behind Ashley Brook. After nearly 2 years off the track, he beat the favourite by 11 lengths and was sent off the even favourite for the Queen Mother Champion Chase on his next start but fell early on in the race, which was won by Voy Por Ustedes. He then had one more run at Aintree, where he was sent off an odds-on favourite for the Melling Chase and finished 3rd behind Monet's Garden.

Well Chief returned to action in the Queen Mother Champion Chase at the 2009 Cheltenham Festival, finishing second behind Master Minded. He was retired after finishing seventh in the same race in 2010.

Well Chief died after an attack of colic in June 2017.

== Pedigree ==
Pedigree of Well Chief (GER), chestnut gelding, 1999
Sire Night Shift (USA) 1980	Northern Dancer (CAN); 1961	Nearctic	Nearco
Sire Night Shift (USA) 1980	Northern Dancer (CAN); 1961	Nearctic	Lady Angela
Sire Night Shift (USA) 1980	Northern Dancer (CAN); 1961	Natalma	Native Dancer
Sire Night Shift (USA) 1980	Northern Dancer (CAN); 1961	Natalma	Almahmoud
Sire Night Shift (USA) 1980	Ciboulette (CAN); 1961	Chip Chop	Flares
Sire Night Shift (USA) 1980	Ciboulette (CAN); 1961	Chip Chop	Sceptical
Sire Night Shift (USA) 1980	Ciboulette (CAN); 1961	Windy Answer	Windfields
Sire Night Shift (USA) 1980	Ciboulette (CAN); 1961	Windy Answer	Reply
Dam Wellesiana (GER) 1994	Scenic (IRE); 1986	Sadler's Wells	Northern Dancer
Dam Wellesiana (GER) 1994	Scenic (IRE); 1986	Sadler's Wells	Fairy Bridge
Dam Wellesiana (GER) 1994	Scenic (IRE); 1986	Idyllic	Foolish Pleasure
Dam Wellesiana (GER) 1994	Scenic (IRE); 1986	Idyllic	Where You Lead
Dam Wellesiana (GER) 1994	Weltkrone (GER); 1982	Lord Udo	Utrillo
Dam Wellesiana (GER) 1994	Weltkrone (GER); 1982	Lord Udo	Lady Windermere
Dam Wellesiana (GER) 1994	Weltkrone (GER); 1982	Weltdame	Dschingis Khan
Dam Wellesiana (GER) 1994	Weltkrone (GER); 1982	Weltdame	Weltwunder (Family: 4-o)
