= Game Spirit Chase =

Steeplechase horse race in Britain

Game Spirit Chase
2026
Lulamba	Saint Segal	Libberty Hunter

Previous years
2025
Master Chewy	Libberty Hunter	Matata
2024
Edwardstone	Funambule Sivola	Only two finished
2023
Funambule Sivola	Elixir De Nutz	Greaneteen
2022
Funambule Sivola	Sceau Royal	Hitman
2021
Sceau Royal	Champ	Greaneteen

2020-2011
2020
Altior	Sceau Royal	Dynamite Dollars
2018
Altior	Politologue	Valdez
2017
Altior	Fox Norton	Dodging Bullets
2016
Top Gamble	Dodging Bullets	Captain Conan
2015
Mr Mole	Upsilon Bleu	Karinga Dancer
2014
Module	Dodging Bullets	Raya Star
2013
Wishfull Thinking	French Opera	Edgardo Sol
2012
Sprinter Sacre	French Opera	I'm So Lucky
2011
French Opera	Tchico Polos	Oiseau de Nuit

2010-2001
2010
Master Minded	Mahogany Blaze	Fix The Rib
2008
Master Minded	Voy Por Ustedes	Mahogany Blaze
2007
Well Chief	Ashley Brook	Armaturk
2006
Don't Be Shy	Armaturk	Mister McGoldrick
2005
Azertyuiop	Well Chief	Armaturk
2004
Azertyuiop	Armaturk	Wahiba Sands
2003
Kadarann	Cenkos	Lady Cricket
2002
Lady Cricket	Fadalko	Eskleybrook
2001
Function Dream	Flagship Uberalles	Super Coin

2000-1991
2000
Flagship Uberalles	Upgrade	Only two finished
1999
Celibate	Mulligan	Nearly An Eye
1998
Ask Tom	Kadastrof	Viking Flagship
1997
Double Symphony	Dancing Paddy	Only two finished
1996
Viking Flagship	Travado	Nakir
1995
Nakir	Snitton Lane	Only two finished
1994
Viking Flagship	Wonder Man	Sybillin
1993
Waterloo Boy	Katabatic	Cyphrate
1992
Waterloo Boy	Uncle Ernie	Master Rajh

1990-1988
1990
Feroda	The Dragon Master	Long Engagement
1989
Mr Key	Meikleour	Long Engagement
1988
Very Promising	Pearlyman	Knockbrack

The Game Spirit Chase is a Grade 2 National Hunt steeplechase in Great Britain which is open to horses aged five years or older. It is run at Newbury over a distance of about 2 miles and ½ furlong (2 miles and 92 yards, or 3,308 metres), and during its running there are thirteen fences to be jumped. The race is scheduled to take place each year in February.

The event was first run in 1953 and is named in memory of Game Spirit, a successful racehorse who was owned by the Queen Mother. During the 1970s Game Spirit won 21 races in six seasons. He also finished third in the 1974 Cheltenham Gold Cup and second in the 1976 Champion Chase. He died from a lung haemorrhage after racing at Newbury in March 1977.

The Game Spirit Chase has held Grade 2 status since 1992. Before then it was classed at Listed level and run as a limited handicap. Since 2012 the race has been sponsored by Betfair and run under various sponsored titles.

== Winners ==
Year	Winner	Age	Jockey	Trainer
1953	Marcianus	7	Dick Francis	George Beeby
1954	Big Bill	8	Ted Fisher	Peter Payne-Gallwey
1955	Belliquex	6	E Kelly	C Cooper
1956	Abandoned due to frost
1957	Buttercleugh	6	George Milburn	Verley Bewicke
1958	Highland Bard	7	George Milburn	Verley Bewicke
1959	Chatelet	7	Jumbo Wilkinson	Bobby Renton
1960	Threepwood	7	George Milburn	Verley Bewicke
1961	Richard of Bordeaux	6	Fred Winter	Fulke Walwyn
1962	Sea Horse	8	Peter Jones	Bill Marshall
1963	Abandoned due to frost and snow
1964	Irish Imp	7	Willie Robinson	Fulke Walwyn
1965	Dunkirk	8	Dave Dick	Peter Cazalet
1966	Flash Bulb	9	Johnny Haine	Bob Turnell
1967	Vulmidas	10	Terry Pinner (Note: amateur jockey)	John Barclay
1968	Stonehaven	8	Stan Mellor	Roddy Armytage
1969	Abandoned due to frost
1970	Abandoned due to frost and snow
1971	Royal Relief	7	John Cook	Edward Courage
1972	Straight Fort	9	Eddie Wright	Jim Dreaper (Ir)
1973	Pendil	8	Richard Pitman	Fred Winter
1974	Abandoned due to waterlogging
1975	Shock Result	9	Andy Turnell	Bob Turnell
1976	Uncle Bing	7	John Burke	G Doidge
1977	Isle of Man	10	Bill Smith	Fulke Walwyn
1978	Abandoned due to frost
1979	Casbah	12	Graham Thorner	Tim Forster
1980	Gambling Prince	7	John Suthern	Mrs G Jones
1981	Abandoned due to frost
1982	News King	8	John Francome	Fred Winter
1983	Abandoned due to frost and snow
1984	Ragafan	7	Robert Hughes	Ron Smyth
1985	Abandoned due to snow
1986	Abandoned due to snow
1987	Pearlyman	8	Peter Scudamore	John Edwards
1988	Very Promising	10	Richard Dunwoody	David Nicholson
1989	Mr Key	8	Simon Sherwood	David Murray Smith
1990	Feroda	9	Tom Taaffe	Arthur Moore
1991	Abandoned due to frost
1992	Waterloo Boy	9	Richard Dunwoody	David Nicholson
1993	Waterloo Boy	10	Richard Dunwoody	David Nicholson
1994	Viking Flagship	7	Adrian Maguire	David Nicholson
1995	Nakir	7	Jamie Osborne	Simon Christian
1996	Viking Flagship	9	Adrian Maguire	David Nicholson
1997	Double Symphony	9	Jamie Osborne	Charlie Brooks
1998	Ask Tom	9	Russ Garritty	Tom Tate
1999	Celibate	8	Mick Fitzgerald	Charlie Mann
2000	Flagship Uberalles	6	Joe Tizzard	Paul Nicholls
2001	Function Dream	9	Anthony Ross	Mary Reveley
2002	Lady Cricket	8	Tony McCoy	Martin Pipe
2003	Kadarann	6	Joe Tizzard	Paul Nicholls
2004	Azertyuiop	7	Ruby Walsh	Paul Nicholls
2005	Azertyuiop	8	Ruby Walsh	Paul Nicholls
2006 (Note: The 2006 running took place at Lingfield Park)	Don't Be Shy	5	Timmy Murphy	Martin Pipe
2007	Well Chief	8	Timmy Murphy	David Pipe
2008	Master Minded	5	Ruby Walsh	Paul Nicholls
2009	Abandoned due to snow
2010	Master Minded	7	Ruby Walsh	Paul Nicholls
2011	French Opera	8	Barry Geraghty	Nicky Henderson
2012	Sprinter Sacre	6	Barry Geraghty	Nicky Henderson
2013	Wishfull Thinking	10	Richard Johnson	Philip Hobbs
2014	Module	7	Paddy Brennan	Tom George
2015	Mr Mole	7	Tony McCoy	Paul Nicholls
2016	Top Gamble	8	Richard Johnson	Kerry Lee
2017	Altior	7	Nico de Boinville	Nicky Henderson
2018	Altior	8	Nico de Boinville	Nicky Henderson
2019	Abandoned due to an equine influenza outbreak
2020	Altior	10	Nico de Boinville	Nicky Henderson
2021	Sceau Royal	9	Daryl Jacob	Alan King
2022	Funambule Sivola	7	Charlie Deutsch	Venetia Williams
2023	Funambule Sivola	8	Charlie Deutsch	Venetia Williams
2024	Edwardstone	10	Tom Cannon	Alan King
2025	Master Chewy	8	Sam Twiston-Davies	Nigel Twiston-Davies
2026	Lulamba	5	Nico de Boinville	Nicky Henderson

== See also ==
- Horse racing in Great Britain
- List of British National Hunt races
