= Frédéric Lagrange (politician) =

French politician

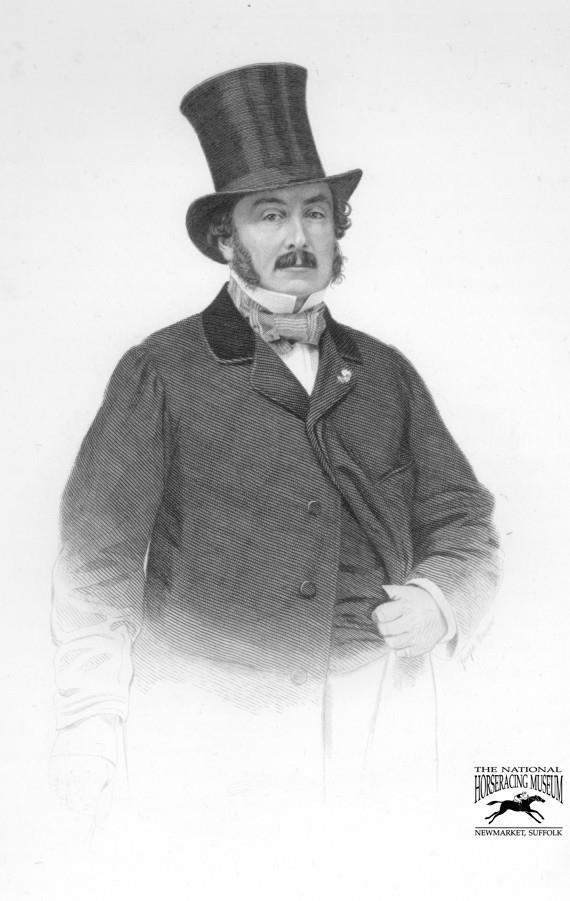
Frederic Lagrange (National Horseracing Museum, Newmarket)

Frédéric Lagrange, 2nd count of Lagrange (21 June 1815, Dangu - 22 November 1883, Paris) was a French politician. His father was the Napoleonic general Joseph Lagrange and his father-in-law was the Belgian businessman and diplomat Joseph de Riquet de Caraman. He was deputy for Gers then senator for Gers, both under the French Second Empire.

He was also a noted racehorse owner and breeder. He set up a stud in England under Tom Jennings Senior and another in France headed by Henry Jennings. In 1856 he bought Monarque, who had won the Prix du Jockey Club the previous year whilst owned by Alexandre Aumont, and used him as a stud. His horse Fille de l'Air won The Oaks in 1864 and another of his horses, Gladiateur, won The Derby and the Grand Prix de Paris, both in 1865, and the Ascot Gold Cup in 1866. Gladiateur became the first foreign-bred horse to win the three British Classic Races which subsequently became known as the Triple Crown. Additionally, his horse, Verneuil, also won the Ascot Cup in 1878.

== Sources ==
- "Frédéric Lagrange". roglo.eu (in French). 1 July 2018.
