= 1976 Grand National =

English steeplechase horse race

- Grand National
- Location: Aintree
- Date: 3 April 1976
- Winning horse: Rag Trade
- Starting price: 14/1
- Jockey: John Burke
- Trainer: (England) Fred Rimell
- Owner: (England) Pierre Raymond
- Conditions: Good

External videos
- 1976 Grand National in full (BBC)

And it's Rag Trade, gonna win a 4th National for Fred Rimell, John Burke is gonna win the National. It's Rag Trade from Red Rum. Red Rum is fighting back but he can't get to him. Rag Trade is running to the line from Red Rum second and Eyecatcher third, that's how they're gonna finish in the National. Rag Trade is the winner!

— Commentator Peter O'Sullevan describes the climax of the 1976 National

The 1976 Grand National (officially known as the News of the World Grand National for sponsorship reasons) was the 130th renewal of the Grand National horse race that took place at Aintree near Liverpool, England, on 3 April 1976. The race was won by Rag Trade, who was the fourth winner trained by Fred Rimell and the second winner owned by Pierre Raymond Bessone. Red Rum finished second for the second year in a row. Rimell's fourth winner gave him the outright record for training most National winners which he had previously shared with six other trainers. His record was equalled by Ginger McCain in 2004.

== Finishing order ==
Position	Name	Jockey	Age	Handicap (st-lb)	SP	Distance
1st	Rag Trade	John Burke	10	10-12	14/1	
2nd	Red Rum	Tommy Stack	11	11-10	10/1	
3rd	Eyecatcher	Brian Fletcher	10	10-7	28/1	
4th	Barona	Paul Kelleway	10	10-6	7/1	
5th	Ceol-Na-Mara	Jeremy Glover	7	10-6	22/1	
6th	The Dikler	Ron Barry	13	11-7	25/1	
7th	Sandwilan	Ron Hyett	8	10-0	100/1	
8th	Spittin Image	Andy Turnell	10	10-0	66/1	
9th	Spanish Steps	Jeff King	13	10-2	22/1	
10th	Black Tudor	Graham Thorner	8	10-0	50/1	
11th	Churchtown Boy	Taffy Salaman	9	10-6	33/1	
12th	Highway View	Pat Black	11	10-10	33/1	
13th	Jolly's Clump	Ian Watkinson	10	10-3	12/1	
14th	Money Market	Bob Champion	9	11-0	12/1	
15th	Colondine	Brian Forsey	9	10-0	60/1	
16th	Indian Diva	Nicky Henderson	9	10-3	100/1	Last to finish

== Non-finishers ==
Fence	Name	Jockey	Age	Handicap (st-lb)	Starting price	Fate
01	Huperade	John Carden	12	10-4	100/1	Fell
01	Ormonde Tudor	Keith Barnfield	7	10-0	100/1	Fell
03	Merry Maker	Anthony Mildmay-White	11	10-2	50/1	Fell
04	High Ken	Michael Dickinson	10	10-12	33/1	Fell
04	Thomond	Jim Wilson	11	10-3	100/1	Brought Down
06	Glanford Brigg	Martin Blackshaw	10	11-3	28/1	Fell
06	Tregarron	Colin Tinkler	9	10-1	12/1	Fell
06	Tudor View	Chris Read	10	10-0	100/1	Fell
13	Meridian II	Jonjo O'Neill	9	10-0	33/1	Fell
13	Nereo	Duke of Alburquerque	10	10-1	100/1	Fell
19	Roman Bar	Gerry Newman	7	10-10	33/1	Fell
20	Perpol	Ken White	10	10-6	66/1	Pulled Up
22	Ballybright	Sam Morshead	9	10-0	80/1	Fell
22	Boom Docker	John Williams	9	10-0	50/1	Brought Down
22	Golden Rapper	John Francome	10	10-8	28/1	Fell
22	Prolan	Mouse Morris	7	10-3	13/1	Brought Down

== Media coverage and aftermath ==
For the 17th consecutive year the BBC broadcast the Grand National in a Grandstand special, presented by David Coleman. In an interview eleven years after the race, Red Rum's trainer, Ginger McCain, expressed that he felt jockey Tommy Stack had made a tactical error in waiting until the penultimate flight before attempting to race to the finish as is, McCain noted, the textbook way to ride a National. He instead felt that if Stack had allowed Red Rum to "kick on from the fifth last flight he would have stretched his rivals and outpaced them". McCain was also quick to point out how much easier it is to ride the Grand National in your head from the stands and praised his rider for a "marvelous effort" The tactics described by McCain turned out to be those employed by Stack in 1977 when the horse won a record breaking third Grand National.

== Sources ==
- "Past Winners of The Grand National". grand-national.net. Archived from the original on 4 November 2011.
