= 1977 Grand National =

Horse race

- Grand National
- Location: Aintree Racecourse
- Date: 2 April 1977
- Winning horse: (England) Red Rum
- Starting price: 9/1 JF
- Jockey: (Republic of Ireland) Tommy Stack
- Trainer: (England) Ginger McCain
- Owner: (England) Noel Le Mare
- Conditions: Good

External videos
- The 1977 Grand National in full (BBC)
- 1977 Grand National in full (BBC)

The 1977 Grand National (officially known as the News of the World Grand National for sponsorship reasons) was the 131st renewal of the Grand National horse race that took place at Aintree Racecourse near Liverpool, England, on 2 April 1977.

The race is best remembered for being Red Rum's third Grand National win, a record that still stands today. He completed the course in 9 minutes 30.3 seconds and went off as 9/1 joint-favourite.

He's getting the most tremendous cheer from the crowd. They're willing him home now. The 12-year-old Red Rum, being preceded only by loose horses, being chased by Churchtown Boy Eyecatcher has moved into third. The Pilgarlic is fourth. They're coming to the elbow, there's a furlong now between Red Rum and his third Grand National triumph! And he's coming up to the line, to win it like a fresh horse in great style. It's hats off and a tremendous reception, you've never heard one like it at Liverpool. Red Rum wins the National.

— Commentator Peter O'Sullevan describes Red Rum's record third Grand National win

== Background ==
Before the race, Red Rum was generally thought too old — at the age of 12 — to win the Grand National for a third time, having come home first in 1973 and 1974, and second in 1975 and 1976. However, being ridden by jockey Tommy Stack for the second consecutive National, the gelding clinched his unprecedented third title, bringing his career earnings to a then steeplechasing record of £114,000.

Red Rum's 1976/77 season had begun badly. After an initial small win at Carlisle he appeared lacklustre in his next four races, and trainer Ginger McCain lost confidence in him. However, the horse finally returned somewhat to his best form when coming sixth in his preparatory race to the 1977 Grand National, the Greenall Whitley Chase at Haydock. In his last gallop before the National, he was back in fine form.

Red Rum was given the top weight for Aintree, but it had dropped to 11 stone 8 lb.

== Race overview ==
A large portion of the 42-strong field was eliminated from the race on the first circuit: 19 had fallen or unseated their riders before the second circuit, including seven at the first fence. Going onto the second round, Boom Docker held a significant lead (the biggest going onto the second circuit in Grand National history) but he refused to jump the 17th fence.

It was not until Becher's Brook (the 22nd) that Red Rum went into first position, when the leader and pre-race favourite, Andy Pandy, over-jumped the fence and came down, when going easily in front and 10 lengths clear. Red Rum was left in front and his lead grew gradually, and he came home 25 lengths ahead of second-placed Churchtown Boy and the mare Eyecatcher in third. Eleven of the 42 runners completed the course. Churchtown Boy had won the Topham Trophy over the national fences just two days earlier when ridden by Chris Read, who finished third in this race on Eyecatcher.

The 1977 National was also notable for being the first in which a female jockey participated. Twenty-one-year-old Charlotte Brew nearly completed the race, though she was a long way behind the leaders. Her horse, Barony Fort, refused at the 27th fence.

Hidden Value had fallen at the 26th and was remounted to finish 10th whilst Saucey Belle had fallen at the 22nd and was remounted to finish last.

== Finishing order ==
Position	Name	Jockey	Age	Handicap (st-lb)	SP	Distance
1st	Red Rum	Tommy Stack	12	11-8	9/1	
2nd	Churchtown Boy	Martin Blackshaw	10	10-0	20/1	
3rd	Eyecatcher	Chris Read	11	10-1	18/1	
4th	The Pilgarlic	Richard Evans	9	10-4	40/1	
5th	Forest King	Reg Crank	8	10-2	33/1	
6th	What A Buck	Jeff King	10	11-4	20/1	
7th	Happy Ranger	Philip Blacker	10	10-5	66/1	
8th	Carroll Street	Richard Linley	10	10-0	50/1	
9th	Collingwood	Colin Hawkins	11	10-0	50/1	
10th	Hidden Value	Jimmy Bourke	9	10-4	40/1	
11th	Saucey Belle	Roy Davies	11	10-0	200/1	Last to finish

== Non-finishers ==
There were two equine fatalities during the race. Winter Rain fell at Becher's Brook on the first circuit and Zeta's Son at Valentine's second time around; both were later euthanised.

Fence	Name	Jockey	Age	Handicap (st-lb)	Starting price	Fate
01	Duffle Coat	Bob Davies	9	10-4	100/1	Fell
01	High Ken	John Edwards	11	11-3	50/1	Brought down
01	Huperade	John Carden	13	10-7	200/1	Unseated rider
01	Pengrail	Ron Atkins	9	10-8	15/1	Fell
01	Spittin' Image	Bob Champion	11	10-5	50/1	Fell
01	War Bonnet	Tommy Carberry	9	10-6	16/1	Fell
01	Willy What	Jeremy Glover	8	10-0	50/1	Fell
03 (Open Ditch)	Burrator	John Docker	8	10-0	50/1	Fell
03 (Open Ditch)	Davy Lad	Dessie Hughes	7	10-3	10/1	Fell
03 (Open Ditch)	Inycarra	Steve Jobar	10	10-0	100/1	Fell
03 (Open Ditch)	Royal Thrust	Colin Tinkler	8	10-0	100/1	Fell
04	Harban	Frank Berry	8	10-0	66/1	Fell
04	Fort Vulgan	Nigel Tinkler	9	10-0	50/1	Brought down
06 (Becher's Brook)	Castelruddery	Liam O'Donnell	11	10-0	40/1	Fell
06 (Becher's Brook)	Sebastian V	Ridley Lamb	9	10-1	22/1	Fell
06 (Becher's Brook)	Winter Rain	Michael Dickinson	9	10-6	16/1	Fell
12	Prince Rock	Graham Thorner	9	10-6	18/1	Fell
15 (The Chair)	Sage Merlin	Ian Watkinson	9	10-5	20/1	Fell
17	Boom Docker	John Williams	10	10-0	66/1	Refused
18	Foresail	Gordon Holmes	10	10-0	100/1	Refused
20	Roman Bar	Pat Kiely	8	10-10	25/1	Fell
21	Gay Vulgan	Bill Smith	9	10-8	9/1	Pulled up
21	Lord of the Hills	David Goulding	10	10-1	100/1	Pulled Up
22 (Becher's Brook)	Andy Pandy	John Burke	8	10-7	15/2 F	Fell
22 (Becher's Brook)	Brown Admiral	Sam Morshead	8	10-1	28/1	Fell
22 (Becher's Brook)	Nereo	Robert Kington	11	10-0	100/1	Fell
22 (Becher's Brook)	The Songwriter	Bryan Smart	8	10-0	200/1	Pulled Up
22 (Becher's Brook)	Sandwilan	Ron Hyett				Refused
24 (Canal Turn)	Sir Garnet	Jonjo O'Neill	8	10-3	20/1	Unseated rider
25 (Valentine's)	Zeta's Son	Mouse Morris	8	11-4	18/1	Fell
27 (Ditch)	Barony Fort	Charlotte Brew	12	10-1	200/1	Refused

== Media coverage and aftermath ==
In an innovation, the BBC placed an audio microphone on one of the jockeys, opting for Graham Thorner, who was partnering Prince Rock, with a view that the rider could give viewers a verbal experience of the National. The audio, however, proved unusable as Thorner, forgetting he was wired for sound, recorded three minutes of expletive-riddled content before a final tirade of expletives signaled his twelfth-fence exit. The BBC had narrowly missed out on media history as Thorner had been a last-minute replacement for the jockey who had initially agreed to be wired up, Tommy Stack. Stack, however, changed his mind in the weighing room when he saw the equipment he was to carry. He duly weighed out without a microphone, and the opportunity for the BBC to get the thoughts of a Grand National-winning jockey while in the act of making history was lost. Frank Bough presented Grand National Grandstand as regular host David Coleman was in a contract dispute with the BBC. In an historic afternoon Night Nurse and Monksfield would dead-heat in the Aintree Hurdle.
