= 1974 Grand National =

English steeplechase horse race

- Grand National
- Location: Aintree
- Date: 30 March 1974
- Winning horse: (England) Red Rum
- Starting price: 11/1
- Jockey: (England) Brian Fletcher
- Trainer: (England) Ginger McCain
- Owner: (England) Noel Le Mare
- Conditions: Good

External videos
- The 1974 Grand National in full (BBC)

A furlong to run, he's got a big weight remember 23 pounds more than last year.. it's Red Rum, from L'Escargot in second, Charles Dickens third and Spanish Steps fourth and racing up towards the line, Red Rum, getting the ovation of his career and Brian Fletcher acknowledges the cheers of the crowd as he comes to the line the winner of the National!

— Commentator Peter O'Sullevan describes the climax of the 1974 National

The 1974 Grand National was the 128th renewal of the Grand National horse race that took place at Aintree near Liverpool, England, on 30 March 1974. The race is famous for the second of Red Rum's three Grand National wins. L'Escargot finished second.

== Finishing order ==
Position	Name	Jockey	Age	Handicap (st-lb)	SP	Distance
01	Red Rum	Brian Fletcher	9	12-0	11/1	
02	L'Escargot	Tommy Carberry	11	11-13	17/2	
03	Charles Dickens	Andy Turnell	10	10-0	50/1	
04	Spanish Steps	Bill Smith	11	11-9	15/1	
05	Rough Silk	Mouse Morris	11	10-0	66/1	
06	Vulgan Town	Johnny Haine	8	10-8	35/1	
07	Rouge Autumn	Ken White	10	10-0	28/1	
08	Nereo	Duke of Alburquerque	8	10-6	100/1	
09	San-Feliu	Pat Buckley	11	10-3	22/1	
10	Norwegian Flag	Jimmy Bourke	8	10-0	50/1	
11	Scout	Tommy Stack	8	10-0	7/1	
12	Quintus	Graham Thorner	8	10-0	33/1	
13	Dunno	Norman Mitchell	10	10-1	100/1	
14	Tubs VI	Val O'Brien	11	10-6	22/1	
15	Escari	Pat Black	8	10-2	66/1	
16	Sunny Lad	David Cartwright	10	10-4	20/1	
17	Princess Camilla	Martin Blackshaw	9	11-4	28/1	Last to finish

== Non-finishers ==
Fence	Name	Jockey	Age	Handicap (st-lb)	Starting price	Fate
01	Royal Relief	John Oaksey	10	11-6	18/1	Fell
03	Go-Pontinental	John Suthern	14	10-0	100/1	Fell
04	Sixer	Taffy Salaman	10	10-0	66/1	Brought Down
06	Bahia Dorada	Joe Guest	9	10-2	100/1	Pulled Up
08	Argent	Bobby Coonan	10	11-10	50/1	Brought Down
08	Culla Hill	Norton Brookes	10	10-8	100/1	Fell
08	Deblin's Green	Nigel Wakley	11	10-0	25/1	Brought Down
08	Huperade	John Carden	10	10-12	100/1	Fell
08	Karacola	Colin Astbury	9	10-0	100/1	Brought Down
08	Rough House	John Burke	8	10-6	14/1	Fell
09	Beggar's Way	Vic Soane	10	10-2	66/1	Refused
10	Shaneman	Ben Hannon	9	10-2	50/1	Unseated Rider
11	Beau Bob	Jeremy Glover	11	10-0	100/1	Fell
18	Straight Vulcan	Ron Barry	8	10-8	15/1	Fell
18	The Tunku	Richard Evans	8	10-1	100/1	Pulled Up
19	Estoile	Ron Hyett	10	10-0	66/1	Fell
19	Glenkiln	Reg Crank	11	10-2	50/1	Fell
20	Cloudsmere	Paul Kellaway	10	10-4	100/1	Carried Out
25	Wolverhampton	Raymond Quinn	7	10-0	25/1	Pulled Up
26	Astbury	William Jenks	11	10-0	66/1	Pulled Up
26	Mill Door	Jimmy McNaught	12	10-2	100/1	Fell
27	Francophile	Richard Pitman	9	10-5	16/1	Refused
27	Pearl Of Montreal	Tommy Kinane	11	10-0	50/1	Pulled Up
27	Roman Holiday	Jeff King	10	10-7	66/1	Pulled Up
27	Stephen's Society	Chris Collins	8	11-5	40/1	Pulled Up

== Media coverage ==
David Coleman presented Grand National Grandstand, the fifteenth year the race was shown live.
