= Marquess of Cirella =

Spanish peerage title

Marquessate of Cirella
- Creation date: 29 December 1618
- Created by: Philip III
- Peerage: Peerage of Spain
- First holder: Antonio Manrique Enríquez de Guzmán y Córdoba, 1st Marquess of Cirella
- Last holder: Jorge Juliá y Díez de Rivera, 4th Marquess of Cirella
- Present holder: Vacant

Marquess of Cirella (Spanish: Marqués de Cirella) is a hereditary title in the peerage of Spain, bestoweded in the Kingdom of Naples on Antonio Manrique Enríquez de Guzmán, knight of the Order of Santiago, by Philip III in 1618.

At the childless death of the 1st Marquess, the title became vacant for more than two centuries until it was rehabilitated in 1926 by Alfonso XIII on behalf of the most legitimate descendant, María del Rosario Díez de Rivera y Figueroa, who was a daughter of the 5th Count of Almodóvar (Grandee of Spain), as well as a first cousin of the 18th Duke of Alburquerque. The title has been vacant since 6 June 2021, when the last holder, Jorge Juliá y Díez de Rivera, committed suicide after murdering his wife.

== Marquesses of Cirella (1618) ==
- Antonio Manrique Enríquez de Guzmán y Córdoba, 1st Marquess of Cirella (d. 1636)

== Marquesses of Cirella (1926) ==
- María del Rosario Díez de Rivera y Figueroa, 2nd Marchioness of Cirella (1887-1978), descendant of the 1st Marquess' sister
- María Dolores Díez de Rivera y Guillamas, 3rd Marchioness of Cirella (1912-2018), eldest daughter of the 2nd Marchioness
- Jorge Juliá y Díez de Rivera, 4th Marquess of Cirella (1955-2021), third son of the 3rd Marchioness

== See also ==
- Kingdom of Naples
