= 1955 Grand National =

English steeplechase horse race

- Grand National
- Location: Aintree Racecourse
- Date: 26 March 1955
- Winning horse: (Republic of Ireland) Quare Times
- Starting price: 100/9
- Jockey: (Republic of Ireland) Pat Taaffe
- Trainer: (Republic of Ireland) Vincent O'Brien
- Owner: Mrs. Cecily Welman
- Conditions: Heavy

External videos
- Highlights of the 1955 Grand National (British Pathé)

The 1955 Grand National was the 109th renewal of the Grand National horse race that took place at Aintree Racecourse near Liverpool, England, on 26 March 1955.

Thirty horses ran in the race, which was won by 100/9 shot Quare Times, who was ridden by jockey Pat Taaffe and trained by Vincent O'Brien. This was O'Brien's third consecutive Grand National win.

Early Mist, the previous year's winner and another O'Brien-trained mount, was the favourite. In attendance at Aintree were The Queen Mother (who owned M'as Tu Vu who was also running in the race), and her daughters Queen Elizabeth II and Princess Margaret.

Several fences had been reduced in severity following an outcry over four equine fatalities in the previous year's National. The heavy going meant the 16th fence (the Water Jump) was omitted – the first time in Grand National history that not all 30 fences were jumped.

== Finishing order ==
| Position | Name | Jockey | Age | Handicap (st-lb) | SP | Distance |
|---|---|---|---|---|---|---|
| 01 | Quare Times | Pat Taaffe | 9 | 11-0 | 100/9 | 12 Lengths |
| 02 | Tudor Line | George Slack | 10 | 11-3 | 10/1 | 4 Lengths |
| 03 | Carey's Cottage | Tosse Taaffe | 8 | 10-11 | 20/1 | |
| 04 | Gigolo | Dick Curran | 10 | 11-3 | 100/6 | |
| 05 | Ontray | Bobby Brewis | 7 | 10-8 | 66/1 | |
| 06 | Gentle Moya | John Straker | 9 | 10-0 | 50/1 | |
| 07 | Clearing | Rex Hamey | 8 | 10-2 | 50/1 | |
| 08 | Wild Wisdom | Lt Col W Holman | 10 | 10-0 | 66/1 | |
| 09 | Early Mist | Bryan Marshall | 10 | 12-3 | 9/1 | |
| 10 | Red Rube | Alan Oughton | 8 | 10-3 | 66/1 | |
| 11 | Irish Lizard | Michael Scudamore | 12 | 10-9 | 100/8 | |
| 12 | Royal Tan | David Dick | 11 | 12-4 | 28/1 | |
| 13 | Uncle Barney | Leo McMorrow | 12 | 10-0 | 50/1 | Last to complete |

== Non-finishers ==
| Fence | Name | Jockey | Age | Handicap (st-lb) | SP | Fate |
|---|---|---|---|---|---|---|
| 01 | Mariner's Log | Dick Francis | 8 | 11-12 | 100/8 | Fell |
| 27 (Open Ditch) | Sundew | Patrick Doyle | 9 | 11-3 | 28/1 | Fell |
| 06 (Becher's Brook) | E.S.B. | Tommy Cusack | 9 | 11-1 | 66/1 | Fell |
| 11 (Open Ditch) | Oriental Way | Fred Winter | 7 | 10-12 | 33/1 | Fell |
| 07 | Copp | Tim Molony | 11 | 10-8 | 7/1 | Fell |
| 27 (Open Ditch) | M'as Tu Vu | Arthur Freeman | 9 | 10-7 | 22/1 | Fell |
| 10 | No Response | Derek Ancil | 9 | 10-2 | 45/1 | Fell |
| 11 (Open Ditch) | Dark Stranger | John Bosley | 10 | 10-5 | 40/1 | Fell |
| 01 | Blue Envoy | Mr E Greenaway | 10 | 10-1 | 66/1 | Fell |
| 03 (Open Ditch) | Another Rake | Derek Leslie | 10 | 10-1 | 45/1 | Fell |
| 07 | Moogie | John Neely | 12 | 10-0 | 66/1 | Fell |
| 11 (Open Ditch) | Munster King II | Victor Speck | 8 | 10-0 | 66/1 | Fell |
| 28 | Sun Clasp | Jimmy Power | 7 | 10-0 | 66/1 | Fell |
| 26 | Mr Linnett | Mr JR Cox | 7 | 11-5 | 20/1 | Pulled Up |
| 24 (Canal Turn) | Little Yid | Rene Emery | 13 | 10-10 | 50/2 | Pulled Up |
| 06 (Becher's Brook) | Roman Fire | Jack Dowdeswell | 12 | 10-0 | 66/1 | Brought Down |
| 27 (Open Ditch) | Steel Lock | Johnny Bullock | 11 | 10-0 | 66/1 | Brought Down |
