= Brian Fletcher =

English jockey

Personal information
- Nationality: English
- Born: 18 May 1947 Cockfield, County Durham, England
- Died: 11 January 2017 (aged 69)

Horse racing career
- Sport: Horse racing

Major racing wins
- 1968 Grand National; 1973 Grand National; 1974 Grand National; 1974 Scottish Grand National

Significant horses
- Red Alligator; Red Rum

Brian Fletcher (18 May 1947 – 11 January 2017) was an English jockey known for riding the horse Red Rum to win the Grand National in 1973 and 1974 and for second place in 1975. He first won the Grand National at the age of 20, in 1968 riding Red Alligator.

== Horse racing career ==
Fletcher began his horse racing career aged 16 with trainer Denys Smith. In 1967, Fletcher rode Red Alligator in the 1967 Grand National, finishing third. The next year, Fletcher rode Red Alligator and won the Grand National. The day before, Fletcher had had a fall and most fellow jockeys had not expected him to race in the event. After missing 10 months after a head injury sustained in 1972, Fletcher returned to horse racing. He won the 1973 and 1974 Grand Nationals riding Red Rum. His record winning time on Red Rum in the 1973 Grand National was to stand for 17 years till beaten by Mr Frisk ridden by Marcus Armytage, and apart from Ernie Piggott, (Lester Piggott's grandfather) and George Stevens (who won five times in the 19th century), Fletcher is the only jockey to have won the Grand National three times. In 1974, Fletcher also won the Scottish Grand National riding Red Rum, and Fletcher came second to Josh Gifford in the jockeys' title race. In 1976, Fletcher had a dispute with Red Rum's trainer Ginger McCain, and rode the 1976 Grand National on Eyecatcher, finishing third. He retired in 1976.

== Personal life and death ==
Fletcher was born and brought up in Cockfield, County Durham. He later farmed sheep and bred Welsh Cobs on a 36-acre (150,000 m^{2}) farm in Carmarthenshire, Wales. After his move to Wales, Fletcher took part in Harness Racing, winning driving Hendre Harrier in September 2004 at Ammanford and was occasionally invited as VIP to racing meets in the UK.

Fletcher died on 11 January 2017 at the age of 69. He had been ill for some time.
