= 1975 Grand National =

English steeplechase horse race

- Grand National
- Location: Aintree
- Date: 5 April 1975
- Winning horse: (Republic of Ireland) L'Escargot
- Starting price: 13/2
- Jockey: (Republic of Ireland) Tommy Carberry
- Trainer: (Republic of Ireland) Dan Moore
- Owner: (United States) Raymond R. Guest
- Conditions: Good

External videos
- The 1975 Grand National in full (BBC)
- The 1975 Grand National (Part 1 of 2) BBC
- The 1975 Grand National (Part 2 of 2) BBC

And L'Escargot is going to avenge last year's defeat. Tommy Carberry is gonna become the first jockey in history to win the Gold Cup, the Irish National and the English National as L'Escargot strides near 12 years old to win the National for Raymond Guest, and here he comes to the line, L'Escargot the comfortable winner of the 1975 National!

— Commentator Peter O'Sullevan describes the climax of the 1975 National

The 1975 Grand National (officially known as the News of the World Grand National for sponsorship reasons) was the 129th renewal of the Grand National horse race that took place at Aintree near Liverpool, England, on 5 April 1975. The race was won by 13/2 second-favourite L'Escargot, ridden by Tommy Carberry, in a time of nine minutes and 31.1 seconds and by a distance of 15 lengths over 7/2 favourite Red Rum, who was thus denied a third consecutive win.

== Finishing order ==
Position	Name	Jockey	Age	Handicap (st-lb)	SP	Distance
01	L'Escargot	Tommy Carberry	12	11-3	13/2	Won by 15 lengths
02	Red Rum	Brian Fletcher	10	12-0	7/2 F	
03	Spanish Steps	Bill Smith	12	10-3	20/1	
04	Money Market	Jeff King	8	10-3	14/1	
05	The Dikler	Ron Barry	12	11-13	20/1	
06	Manicou Bay	Bob Champion	9	10-7	40/1	
07	Southern Quest	S Shields	8	10-6	33/1	
08	Glanford Brigg	Martin Blackshaw	9	11-4	20/1	
09	Hally Percy	Macer Gifford	11	10-0	66/1	
10	Rag Trade	John Francome	9	10-4	18/1	Last to complete

== Non-finishers ==
Fence	Name	Jockey	Age	Handicap (st-lb)	Starting price	Fate
02	Clear Cut	Tommy Stack	11	11-1	20/1	Fell
02	Junior Partner	Ken White	8	10-0	18/1	Fell
04	Rough House	John Burke	9	10-12	12/1	Fell
04	Zimulator	Donald Swan	8	10-0	100/1	Fell
05	Castleruddery	Ted Walsh	9	10-4	28/1	Refused
06	April Seventh	Andy Turnell	9	11-0	28/1	Unseated Rider
06	Barona	Paul Kelleway	9	10-8	40/1	Unseated Rider
06	Spittin Image	Michael Cummins	9	10-0	50/1	Fell
07	Royal Relief	John Oaksey	11	11-1	22/1	Fell
08	Ballyrichard Again	Anthony Webber	10	10-1	40/1	Unseated Rider
13	Feel Free	Taffy Salaman	9	10-0	66/1	Fell
13	Tudor View	Gerry McNally	9	10-1	100/1	Brought Down
15	Even Dawn	David Mould	8	10-4	50/1	Pulled Up
15	Land Lark	Graham Thorner	10	10-1	14/1	Fell
15	Shaneman	Peter Greenall	10	10-8	100/1	Pulled Up
17	Ballyath	Jimmy Bourke	9	10-0	100/1	Pulled Up
19	Rough Silk	Luis Urbano	12	10-8	28/1	Refused
21	High Ken	Barry Brogan	9	11-1	28/1	Fell
22	Beau Bob	Jeremy Glover	12	10-1	100/1	Fell
25	Kilmore Boy	Philip Blacker	9	10-2	40/1	Fell
26	Glen Owen	Dennis Atkins	8	10-0	18/1	Fell

== Media coverage and aftermath ==
David Coleman presented a Grand National Grandstand special. Unfortunately, this year saw two fatalities. Land Lark suffered a heart attack whilst jumping the 15th and Beau Bob who had noticeably tired and dropped back to the rear took a heavy fall at Becher's Brook on the second circuit (22nd fence) and had to be euthanized.

== Sources ==
- "Past Winners of The Grand National". grand-national.net. Archived from the original on 4 November 2011.
- "The Pittsburgh Press - Google News Archive Search". news.google.com.
