= John Smith's People's Race =

Amateur flat race

The John Smith's People's Race is an amateur flat race for members of the public, held at Aintree Racecourse during the April Grand National meeting. It was introduced in 2006.

A total prize fund of £100,000 has been donated by the sponsors, John Smith's Brewery. The fund is donated to the charities of the competitors' choosing. All competitors automatically get £5,000 for their charities, while the winner's charity gets an additional £50,000.
