= Grand National =

English steeplechase horse race at Aintree Racecourse

Coordinates: 53°28′37″N 2°56′30″W

- Previous: 2026 Grand National; April 11, 2026; Next: 2027 Grand National; April 10, 2027
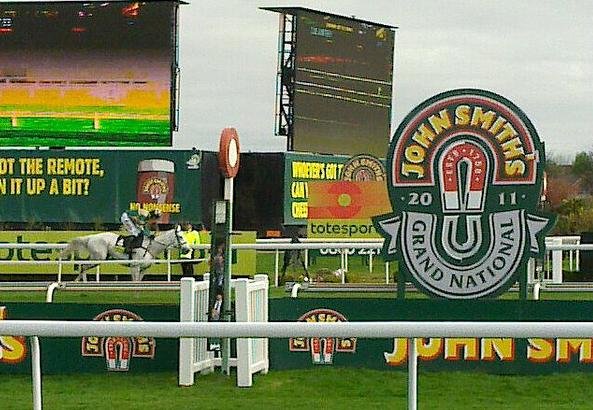
- The Grand National in 2011
- Class: Premier Handicap
- Location: Aintree Racecourse; Aintree, Merseyside, England
- Inaugurated: 26 February 1839; 187 years ago
- Race type: Steeplechase
- Sponsor: Randox
- Website: Grand National

Race information
- Distance: 4 miles 514 yards (6.907 km)
- Surface: Turf
- Track: Left-handed
- Qualification: Seven-years-old and up Rated 125 or more by BHA; Previously placed in a recognised chase of 2 miles 7 1/2 furlongs (4.7 km) or more
- Weight: Handicap; Maximum: 11 stone 12 pounds (75 kg; 166 lb)
- Purse: £1,000,000 (2022); Winner: £500,000

Grand National
2026
| I Am Maximus | Iroko | Jordans |

Previous years
2025
Nick Rockett | I Am Maximus | Grangeclare West
2024
I Am Maximus | Delta Work | Minella Indo
2023
Corach Rambler | Vanillier | Gaillard Du Mesnil
2022
Noble Yeats | Any Second Now | Delta Work
2021
Minella Times | Balko Des Flos | Any Second Now

2020-2011
2019
Tiger Roll | Magic Of Light | Rathvinden
2018
Tiger Roll | Pleasant Company | Bless The Wings
2017
One For Arthur | Cause Of Causes | Saint Are
2016
Rule The World | The Last Samuri | Vics Canvas
2015
Many Clouds | Saint Are | Monbeg Dude
2014
Pineau De Re | Balthazar King | Double Seven
2013
Auroras Encore | Cappa Bleu | Teaforthree
2012
Neptune Collonges | Sunnyhillboy | Seabass
2011
Ballabriggs | Oscar Time | Don't Push It

2010-2001
2010
Don't Push It | Black Apalachi | State of Play
2009
Mon Mome | Comply Or Die | My Will
2008
Comply Or Die | King Johns Castle | Snowy Morning
2007
Silver Birch | Mckelvey | Slim Pickings
2006
Numbersixvalverde | Hedgehunter | Clan Royal
2005
Hedgehunter | Royal Auclair | Simply Gifted
2004
Amberleigh House | Clan Royal | Lord Atterbury
2003
Monty's Pass | Supreme Glory | Amberleigh House
2002
Bindaree | What's Up Boys | Blowing Wind
2001
Red Marauder | Smarty | Blowing Wind

2000–1991
2000
Papillon | Mely Moss | Niki Dee
1999
Bobbyjo | Blue Charm | Call It A Day
1998
Earth Summit | Suny Bay | Samlee
1997
Lord Gyllene | Suny Bay | Camelot Knight
1996
Rough Quest | Encore Un Peu | Superior Finish
1995
Royal Athlete | Party Politics | Over The Deel
1994
Miinnehoma | Just So | Moorcroft Boy
1992
Party Politics | Romany King | Laura's Beau
1991
Seagram | Garrison Savannah | Auntie Dot

1990–1981
1990
Mr Frisk | Durham Edition | Rinus
1989
Little Polveir | West Tip | The Thinker
1988
Rhyme 'N' Reason | Durham Edition | Monanore
1987
Maori Venture | The Tsarevich | Lean Ar Aghaidh
1986
West Tip | Young Driver | Classified
1985
Last Suspect | Mr Snugfit | Corbiere
1984
Hallo Dandy | Greasepaint | Corbiere
1983
Corbiere | Greasepaint | Yer Man
1982
Grittar | Hard Outlook | Loving Words
1981
Aldaniti | Spartan Missile | Royal Mail

1980–1971
1980
Ben Nevis | Rough and Tumble | The Pilgarlic
1979
Rubstic | Zongalero | Rough and Tumble
1978
Lucius | Sebastian | Drumroan
1977
Red Rum | Churchtown Boy | Eyecatcher
1976
Rag Trade | Red Rum | Eyecatcher
1975
L'Escargot | Red Rum | Spanish Steps
1974
Red Rum | L'Escargot | Charles Dickens
1973
Red Rum | Crisp | L'Escargot
1972
Well to Do | Gay Trip | Black Secret
1971
Specify | Black Secret | Astbury

1970–1961
1970
Gay Trip | Vulture | Miss Hunter
1969
Highland Wedding | Steel Bridge | Rondetto
1968
Red Alligator | Moidore's Token | Different Class
1967
Foinavon | Honey End | Red Alligator
1966
Anglo | Freddie | Forest Prince
1965
Jay Trump | Freddie | Mr Jones
1964
Team Spirit | Purple Silk | Peacetown
1963
Ayala | Carrickbeg | Hawas Song
1962
Kilmore | Wyndburgh | Mr What
1961
Nicolaus Silver | Merryman II | O'Malley Point

1960–1951
1960
Merryman II | Badanloch | Clear Profit
1959
Oxo | Wyndburgh | Mr What
1958
Mr What | Tiberetta | Green Drill
1957
Sundew | Wyndburgh | Tiberetta
1956
E.S.B. | Gentle Moya | Royal Tan
1955
Quare Times | Tudor Line | Carey's Cottage
1954
Royal Tan | Tudor Line | Irish Lizard
1953
Early Mist | Mont Tremblant | Irish Lizard
1952
Teal | Legal Joy | Wot No Sun
1951
Nickel Coin | Royal Tan | Derrinstown

1950–1946
1950
Freebooter | Wot No Sun | Acthon Major
1949
Russian Hero | Roimond | Royal Mount
1948
Sheila's Cottage | First of the Dandies | Cromwell
1947
Caughoo | Lough Conn | Kami
1946
Lovely Cottage | Jack Finlay | Prince Regent

The Grand National is a National Hunt horse race held annually at Aintree Racecourse in Aintree, Merseyside, England, near Liverpool. First run in 1839 as the Grand Liverpool Steeplechase, it is a handicap steeplechase over 4 miles 2 1/2 furlongs (4 miles 550 yards; 7 kilometres), with horses jumping 30 fences over two laps. It is the most valuable jump race in Europe, with a prize fund of £1 million in 2017. An event that is prominent in British culture, the race is popular amongst many people who do not normally watch or bet on horse racing at other times of the year.

The course over which the race is run features much larger fences than those found on conventional National Hunt tracks. Many of these fences, particularly Becher's Brook, The Chair and the Canal Turn, have become famous in their own right and, combined with the distance of the event, create often described as "the ultimate test of horse and rider".

The Grand National has been broadcast live on free-to-air terrestrial television in the United Kingdom since 1960. From then, until 2012, it was broadcast by the BBC. Channel 4 broadcast the event between 2013 and 2016: UK broadcasting rights were transferred to ITV from 2017. An estimated 500 to 600 million people watch the Grand National in over 140 countries. The race has also been broadcast on radio since 1927; BBC Radio held exclusive rights until 2013. Talksport acquired radio commentary rights in 2014: Both the BBC and Talksport currently broadcast the race in full.

The Grand National has had three major disruptions: the 1993 Grand National was not held due to a series of false starts, the 1997 Grand National was postponed to the Monday because of an IRA bomb threat, and the 2023 Grand National was delayed due to Animal Rising protesters.

The 2026 Grand National was won by the 2024 winner I Am Maximus, trained by Willie Mullins and ridden by Paul Townend. Since 2017, the race and accompanying festival have been sponsored by Randox.

== History ==
=== Founding and early Nationals (1829–1850) ===
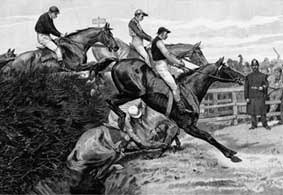
1890 engraving of horses jumping the famous Becher's Brook fence in the Grand National.

External videos
- A television item on the history of the Grand National, broadcast in 1969 (British Pathé)

The Grand National was founded by William Lynn, a syndicate head and proprietor of the Waterloo Hotel, on land he leased in Aintree from William Molyneux, 2nd Earl of Sefton. Lynn set out a course, built a grandstand, and Lord Sefton laid the foundation stone on 7 February 1829. There is much debate regarding the first official Grand National; most leading published historians, including John Pinfold, now prefer the idea that the first running was in 1836 and was won by The Duke. This same horse won again in 1837, while Sir William was the winner in 1838. These races have long been disregarded because of the belief that they took place at Maghull and not Aintree. However, some historians have unearthed evidence in recent years that suggests those three races were run over the same course at Aintree and were regarded as having been Grand Nationals up until the mid-1860s. Contemporary newspaper reports place all the 1836–38 races at Aintree, although the 1839 race is the first described as "national". However, attempts to restore The Nationals of 1836–1838 in the record books have been unsuccessful.

In 1838 and 1839 three significant events occurred to transform the race from a small local affair to a national event. Firstly, the Great St. Albans Chase, which had clashed with the steeplechase at Aintree, was not renewed after 1838, leaving a major hole in the chasing calendar. Secondly, the railway, opened from Manchester to Liverpool in 1830, was linked to a line from London and Birmingham in 1839 enabling rail transport to the Liverpool area from large parts of the country for the first time. Finally, a committee was formed to better organise the event. These factors led to a more highly publicised race in 1839 which attracted a larger field of top quality horses and riders, greater press coverage, and increased attendance on race day. Over time the first three runnings of the event were quickly forgotten to secure the 1839 race its place in history as the first official Grand National.

The 1839 race was won by rider Jem Mason on the aptly named, Lottery. The Duke was ridden by Martin Becher. The fence Becher's Brook is named after him and is where he fell in the race.

By the 1840s, Lynn's ill health blunted his enthusiasm for Aintree. Edward Topham, a respected handicapper and prominent member of Lynn's syndicate, began to exert greater influence over the National. He turned the chase into a handicap in 1843 after it had been a weight-for-age race for the first four years, and took over the land lease in 1848. One century later, the Topham family bought the course outright.

Later in the century, the race was the setting of a thriller by the popular novelist Henry Hawley Smart.

=== War National Steeplechase (1916–1918) ===
For three years during the First World War, while Aintree Racecourse was taken over by the War Office, an alternative race was run at Gatwick Racecourse, a now disused course on land now occupied by Gatwick Airport. The first of these races, in 1916, was called the Racecourse Association Steeplechase, and in 1917 and 1918 the race was called the War National Steeplechase. The races at Gatwick are not always recognised as "Grand Nationals" and their results are often omitted from winners' lists.

=== Tipperary Tim (1928) ===
On the day of the 1928 Grand National, before the race had begun, Tipperary Tim's jockey William Dutton heard a friend call out to him: "Billy boy, you'll only win if all the others fall down!" These words turned out to be true, as 41 of the 42 starters fell during the race. That year's National was run during misty weather conditions with the going very heavy. As the field approached the Canal Turn on the first circuit, Easter Hero fell, causing a pile-up from which only seven horses emerged with seated jockeys. By the penultimate fence, this number had reduced to three, with Great Span looking most likely to win ahead of Billy Barton and Tipperary Tim. Great Span's saddle then slipped, leaving Billy Barton in the lead until he too then fell. Although Billy Barton's jockey Tommy Cullinan managed to remount and complete the race, it was Tipperary Tim who came in first at outside odds of 100/1. With only two riders completing the course, this remains a record for the lowest number of finishers.

=== Second World War and the 1950s ===
Although the Grand National was run as normal in 1940 and most other major horse races around the world were able to be held throughout the war, the commandeering of Aintree Racecourse for defence use in 1941 meant no Grand National could be held from 1941 to 1945. It recommenced in 1946, when it was run on a Friday, and from 1947 was moved to a Saturday, at the urging of the Home Secretary James Chuter Ede, who thought this would make it more accessible to working people. It has normally been run on a Saturday ever since.

During the 1950s the Grand National was dominated by Vincent O'Brien, who trained different winners of the race for three consecutive years between 1953 and 1955. Early Mist secured O'Brien's first victory in 1953; Royal Tan won in 1954, and Quare Times completed the Irish trainer's hat-trick in 1955.

Oh, that's racing!

— The Queen Mother on Devon Loch's collapse moments from certain victory

The running of the 1956 Grand National witnessed one of the chase's most bizarre incidents. Devon Loch, owned by Queen Elizabeth The Queen Mother, had cleared the final fence in the leading position, five lengths clear of E.S.B. Forty yards (37 m) from what seemed like certain victory, Devon Loch suddenly, and inexplicably, half-jumped into the air and collapsed in a belly-flop on the turf. Despite efforts by jockey Dick Francis, Devon Loch was unable to complete the race, leaving E.S.B. to cross the finishing line first. Responding to the commiserations of E.S.B.’s owner, the Queen Mother famously commented: "Oh, that's racing!"

Had Devon Loch completed the race he might have set a new record for the fastest finishing time, which E.S.B. missed by only four-fifths of a second. Many explanations have been offered for Devon Loch's behaviour on the run-in, but the incident remains inexplicable. The incident became part of the folklore of the event, and by extension British sporting culture. In modern language, the phrase "to do a Devon Loch" is often used to describe a last-minute failure to achieve an expected victory.

=== Foinavon (1967) ===
Rutherfords has been hampered, and so has Castle Falls; Rondetto has fallen, Princeful has fallen, Norther has fallen, Kirtle Lad has fallen, The Fossa has fallen, there's a right pile-up... And now, with all this mayhem, Foinavon has gone off on his own! He's about 50, 100 yards [46, 91 m] in front of everything else!

— Commentator Michael O'Hehir describes the chaotic scene at the 23rd fence in 1967

In the 1967 Grand National, most of the field were hampered or dismounted in a mêlée at the 23rd fence, allowing a rank-outsider, Foinavon, to become a surprise winner at odds of 100/1. A loose horse named Popham Down, who had unseated his rider at the first jump, suddenly veered across the leading group at the 23rd, causing them to either stop, refuse or unseat their riders. Racing journalist Lord Oaksey described the resulting pile-up by saying that Popham Down had "cut down the leaders like a row of thistles". Some horses even started running in the wrong direction, back the way they had come. Foinavon, whose owner had such little faith in him that he had travelled to Worcester that day instead, had been lagging some 100 yards (91 m) behind the leading pack, giving his jockey, John Buckingham, time to steer his mount wide of the havoc and make a clean jump of the fence on the outside. Although 17 jockeys remounted and some made up considerable ground, particularly Josh Gifford on 15/2 favourite Honey End, none had time to catch Foinavon before he crossed the finishing line. The 7th/23rd fence was officially named the 'Foinavon fence' in 1984.

=== 1970s and Red Rum ===
The 1970s were mixed years for the Grand National. In 1973, eight years after Mrs. Mirabel Topham announced she was seeking a buyer, the racecourse was finally sold to property developer Bill Davies. Davies tripled the admission prices, and consequently, the attendance at the 1975 race, won by L'Escargot, was the smallest in living memory. It was after this that bookmaker Ladbrokes made an offer, signing an agreement with Davies allowing them to manage the Grand National.

They're willing him home now! The 12-year-old Red Rum, being preceded only by loose horses, being chased by Churchtown Boy... They're coming to the elbow, just a furlong now between Red Rum and his third Grand National triumph! It's hats off and a tremendous reception, you've never heard one like it at Liverpool... Red Rum wins the National!

— Commentator Peter O'Sullevan describes Red Rum's record third Grand National win in 1977

During this period, Red Rum was breaking all records to become the most successful racehorse in Grand National history. Originally bought as a yearling in 1966 for 400 guineas (£420), he passed through various training yards before being bought for 6,000 guineas (£6,300) by Ginger McCain on behalf of Noel le Mare. Two days after the purchase while trotting the horse on Southport beach, McCain noticed that Red Rum appeared lame. The horse was suffering from pedal osteitis, an inflammatory bone disorder. McCain had witnessed many lame carthorses reconditioned by being galloped in sea-water. He successfully used this treatment on his newly acquired racehorse.

Red Rum became, and remains as of 2026, the only horse to have won the Grand National three times, in 1973, 1974, and 1977. He also finished second in the two intervening years, 1975 and 1976.

In 1973, he was in second place at the last fence, 15 lengths behind champion horse Crisp, who was carrying 23 lb (10 kg). Red Rum made up the ground on the run-in and, two strides from the finishing post, he pipped the tiring Crisp to win by three-quarters of a length in what is arguably the most memorable Grand National of all time. Red Rum finished in 9 minutes 1.9 seconds, taking 18.3 seconds off the previous record for the National which had been set in 1935 by Reynoldstown. His record was to stand for the next seventeen years.

=== Bob Champion's National (1981) ===
Two years before the 1981 Grand National, jockey Bob Champion had been diagnosed with testicular cancer and given only months to live by doctors. But by 1981 he had recovered and was passed fit to ride in the Grand National. He rode Aldaniti, a horse deprived in its youth and which had only recently recovered from chronic leg problems. Despite a poor start, the pair went on to win 4 lengths ahead of the much-fancied Spartan Missile, ridden by amateur jockey and 54-year-old grandfather John Thorne. Champion and Aldaniti were instantly propelled to celebrity status, and within two years, their story had been re-created in the film Champions, starring John Hurt.

=== Seagram's sponsorship (1984–1991) ===
From 1984 to 1991, Seagram sponsored the Grand National. The Canadian distiller provided a solid foundation on which the race's revival could be built, firstly enabling the course to be bought from Davies and to be run and managed by the Jockey Club. It is said that Ivan Straker, Seagram's UK chairman, became interested in the potential opportunity after reading a passionate newspaper article written by journalist Lord Oaksey, who, in his riding days, had come within three-quarters of a length of winning the 1963 National. The last Seagram-sponsored Grand National was in 1991. Coincidentally, the race was won by a horse named Seagram. Martell, then a Seagram subsidiary, took over sponsorship of the Aintree meeting for an initial seven years from 1992, in a £4 million deal.

=== The race that never was (1993) ===
The result of the 1993 Grand National was declared void after a series of incidents commentator Peter O'Sullevan later called "the greatest disaster in the history of the Grand National."

While under starter's orders, one jockey was tangled in the starting tape which had failed to rise correctly. A false start was declared, but due to a lack of communication between course officials, 30 of the 39 jockeys did not realise this and began the race.

Course officials tried to stop the runners by waving red flags, but many jockeys continued to race, believing that they were protesters (a group of whom had invaded the course earlier), while Peter Scudamore only stopped because he saw his trainer, Martin Pipe, waving frantically at him.

Seven horses completed the course, meaning the result was void. The first past the post was Esha Ness (in the second-fastest time ever), ridden by John White, trained by Jenny Pitman and owned by Patrick Bancroft.

=== The Monday National (1997) ===
The 1997 Grand National was postponed after two coded bomb threats were received from the Provisional Irish Republican Army. The course was secured by police who then evacuated jockeys, race personnel, and local residents along with 60,000 spectators. Cars and coaches were locked in the course grounds, leaving some 20,000 people without their vehicles over the weekend. With limited accommodation available in the city, local residents opened their doors and took in many of those stranded. This prompted tabloid headlines such as "We'll fight them on the Becher's", in reference to Winston Churchill's war-time speech. The race was run 48 hours later on the Monday, with the meeting organisers offering 20,000 tickets with free admission.

=== Recent history (2004–present) ===
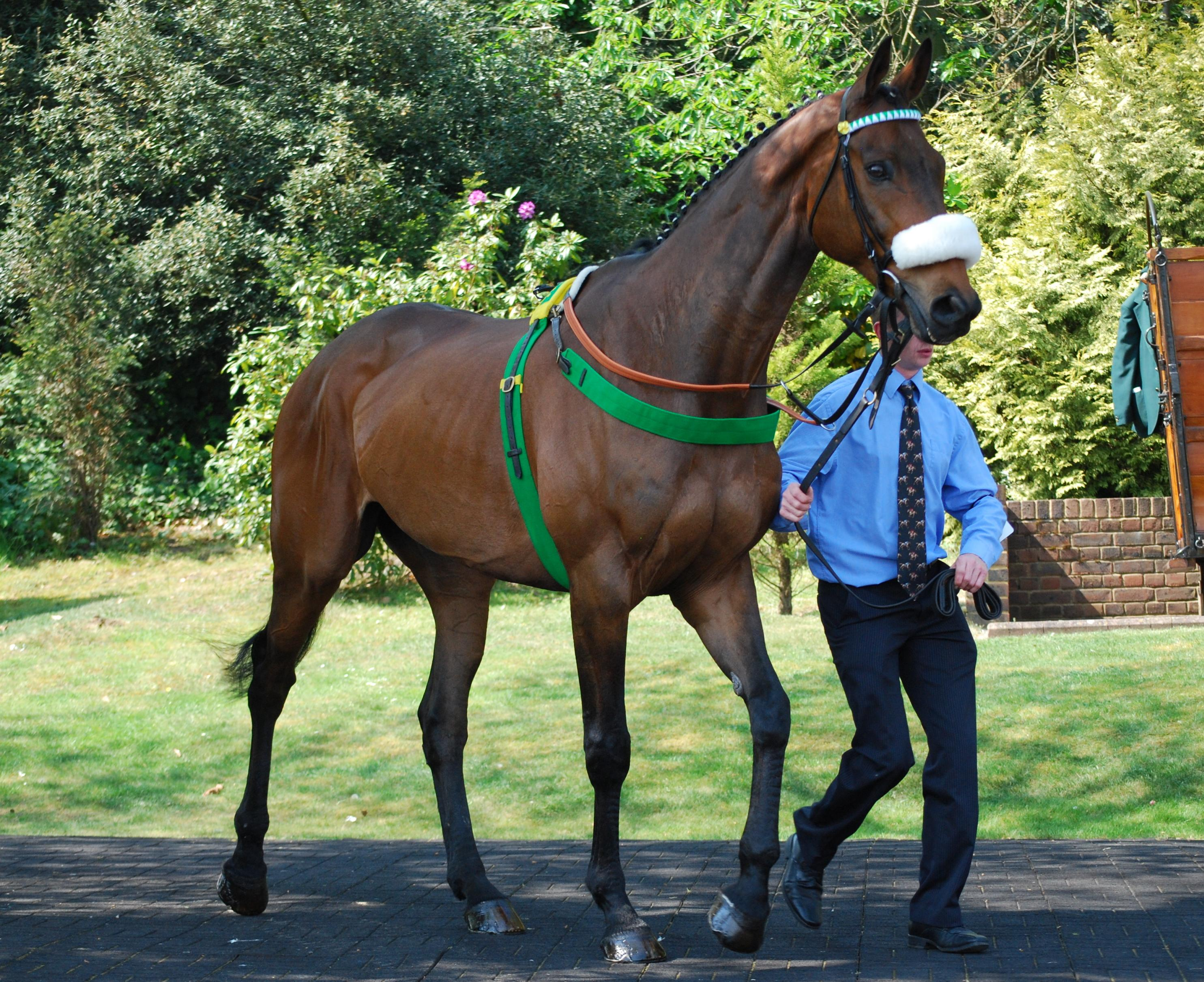
Ballabriggs, the winner of the 2011 Grand National.

Red Rum's trainer Ginger McCain returned to the Grand National in 2004, 31 years after Red Rum's epic run-in defeat of Crisp to secure his first of three wins. McCain's Amberleigh House came home first, ridden by Graham Lee, overtaking Clan Royal on the final straight. Hedgehunter, who would go on to win in 2005, fell at the last while leading. McCain had equalled George Dockeray and Fred Rimell's record feat of training four Grand National winners.

In 2005 John Smith's took over from Martell as main sponsors of the Grand National and many of the other races at the three-day Aintree meeting for the first time. In 2006 John Smith's launched the John Smith's People's Race which gave ten members of the public the chance to ride in a flat race at Aintree on Grand National day. In total, thirty members of the public took part in the event before it was discontinued in 2010.

In 2009, Mon Mome became the longest-priced winner of the National for 42 years when he defied outside odds of 100/1 to win by 12 lengths. The victory was also the first for trainer Venetia Williams, the first female trainer to triumph since Jenny Pitman in 1995. The race was also the first National ride for Liam Treadwell.

In 2010 the National became the first horse race to be televised in high-definition in the UK.

In August 2013 Crabbie's was announced as the new sponsor of the Grand National. The three-year deal between the alcoholic ginger beer producer and Aintree saw the race run for a record purse of £1 million in 2014.

In March 2016 it was announced that Randox Health would take over from Crabbie's as official partners of the Grand National festival from 2017, for at least five years. The sponsorship award was controversial as Aintree's chairwoman, Rose Paterson, was married to Owen Paterson, a Member of Parliament (MP) who also earns a £50,000 annual fee as a consultant for Randox.

The 2020 race was declared void again for the first time since 1993 owing to the coronavirus pandemic; in its place, a virtual race was produced using CGI technology and based on algorithms of the 40 horses most likely to have competed. The virtual race was won by Potters Corner, winner of the 2019 Welsh Grand National. (Another computer-generated virtual race was made also, whose runners were many horses who had won the Grand National in past years, each shown with its performance as at its racing prime. Its winner was Red Rum by less than a length, having just passed Manifesto.)

In December 2020 Randox Health announced they had extended their sponsorship for a further 5 years which will make them sponsors to 2026.

In 2021, Rachael Blackmore became the first female jockey to win the race, on the horse Minella Times.

In 2023, the race was disrupted by the Animal Rising protests and the Just Stop Oil protests, the first such disruptions since the cancellations of the 1993 Grand National due to a series of false starts, the 1997 Grand National due to the IRA bomb threat and even the 2020 Grand National due to the COVID-19 pandemic.

== The course ==
The Grand National is run over the National Course at Aintree and consists of two laps of 16 fences, the first 14 of which are jumped twice. Horses completing the race cover a distance of 4 miles 514 yards (6.907 km), the longest of any National Hunt race in Britain. As part of a review of safety following the 2012 running of the event, from 2013 to 2015 the start was moved 90 yards (82 m) forward away from the crowds and grandstands, reducing the race distance by 110 yards (100 m) from the historical 4 miles 856 yards (7.220 km). The course has one of the longest run-ins from the final fence of any steeplechase, at 494 yards (452 m).

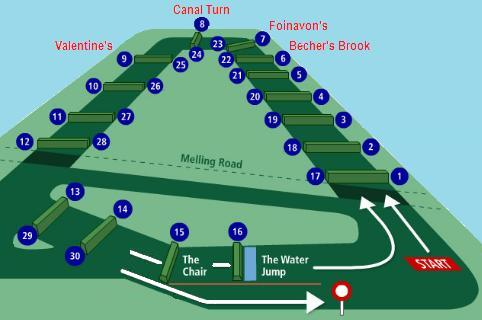
A map of the National Course at Aintree

The Grand National was designed as a cross-country steeplechase when it was first officially run in 1839. The runners started at a lane on the edge of the racecourse and raced away from the course out over open countryside towards the Leeds and Liverpool Canal. The gates, hedges, and ditches that they met along the way were flagged to provide them with the obstacles to be jumped along the way with posts and rails erected at the two points where the runners jumped a brook. The runners returned towards the racecourse by running along the edge of the canal before re-entering the course at the opposite end. The runners then ran the length of the racecourse before embarking on a second circuit before finishing in front of the stands. The majority of the race, therefore, took place not on the actual Aintree Racecourse but instead in the adjoining countryside. That countryside was incorporated into the modern course but commentators still often refer to it as "the country".

=== Fences ===
There are 16 fences on the National Course topped with spruce from the Lake District. The cores of 12 fences were rebuilt in 2012 and they are now made of a flexible plastic material which is more forgiving than the traditional wooden core fences. They are still topped with at least 14 inches (36 cm) of spruce for the horses to knock off. Some of the jumps carry names from the history of the race. All 16 are jumped on the first lap, but on the final lap, the runners bear to the right onto the run-in for home, avoiding The Chair and the Water Jump. The following is a summary of all 16 fences on the course:

Fence 1 & 17

Height: 4 feet 6 inches (1.37 m)
Often met at great speed, which can lead to several falls, the highest being 12 runners in 1951. The drop on the landing side was reduced after the 2011 Grand National. It was bypassed in both 2019 and 2023 on the final lap, after equine casualties. The fence was moved 60 yards (55 m) nearer to the start from the 2024 race, to try to reduce the speed of the field early in the race.

Fence 2 & 18

Height: 4 feet 7 inches (1.40 m)
Before 1888 the first two fences were located approximately halfway between the first to second and second to third jumps. The second became known as The Fan, after a mare who refused the obstacle three years in succession. The name fell out of favour with the relocation of the fences.

Fence 3 & 19 – open ditch

Height: 4 feet 10 inches (1.47 m); fronted by a 6 feet (1.83 m) ditch
The first big test in the race as horses are still adapting to the obstacles. In 2022, the race was shortened to 29 fences by bypassing this fence following a fatality.

Fence 4 & 20

Height: 4 feet 10 inches (1.47 m)
A testing obstacle that often leads to falls and unseated riders. In 2011 the 20th became the first fence in Grand National history to be bypassed on the final lap, following an equine fatality.

Fence 5 & 21

Height: 5 feet (1.52 m)
A plain obstacle which precedes the most famous fence on the course. It was bypassed on the final lap for the first time in 2012 so that medics could treat a jockey who fell from his mount on the first lap and had broken a leg.

Fence 6 & 22 – Becher's Brook

Height: 5 feet (1.52 m), with the landing side 6 inches (15 cm) to 10 inches (25 cm) lower than the takeoff side
The drop at this fence often catches runners by surprise. Becher's has always been a popular vantage point as it can present one of the most spectacular displays of jumping when the horse and rider meet the fence right. Jockeys must sit back in their saddles and use their body weight as ballast to counter the steep drop. It takes its name from Captain Martin Becher who fell there in the first Grand National and took shelter in the small brook running along the landing side of the fence while the remainder of the field thundered over. It is said that Becher later reflected: "Water tastes disgusting without the benefits of whisky." It was bypassed in 2011 along with fence 20, after an equine casualty, and again in 2018 after a jockey was attended by doctors, both occurring on the final lap.

Fence 7 & 23 – Foinavon

Height: 4 feet 6 inches (1.37 m)
One of the smallest on the course, it was named in 1984 after the 1967 winner who avoided a mêlée at the fence to go on and win the race at outside odds of 100/1.

Fence 8 & 24 – Canal Turn

Height: 5 ft (1.52 m)
Noted for its sharp 90-degree left turn immediately after landing. Before the First World War it was not uncommon for loose horses to continue straight ahead after the jump and end up in the Leeds and Liverpool Canal itself. There was once a ditch before the fence but this was filled in after a mêlée in the 1928 race. It was bypassed for the first time in 2015 on the final lap as vets arrived to treat a horse who fell on the first lap.

Fence 9 & 25 – Valentine's Brook

Height: 5 feet (1.52 m) with a 5 feet 6 inches (1.68 m) brook
The fence was originally known as the Second Brook but was renamed after a horse named Valentine was reputed to have jumped the fence hind legs first in 1840. A grandstand was erected alongside the fence in the early part of the 20th century but fell into decline after the Second World War and was torn down in the 1970s.

Fence 10 & 26

Height: 5 feet (1.52 m)
A plain obstacle that leads the runners alongside the canal towards two ditches.

Fence 11 & 27 – open ditch

Height: 4 feet 10 inches (1.47 m), with a 6 feet (1.83 m) ditch on the takeoff side. This fence was 5 feet hight but was lowered by 2 inches from 2024.

Fence 12 & 28 – ditch

Height: 5 feet (1.52 m), with a 5 feet 6 inches (1.68 m) ditch on the landing side

The runners then cross the Melling Road near to the Anchor Bridge, a popular vantage point since the earliest days of the race. This also marks the point where the runners are said to be re-entering the "racecourse proper". In the early days of the race, it is thought there was an obstacle near this point known as the Table Jump, which may have resembled a bank similar to those still seen at Punchestown in Ireland. In the 1840s the Melling Road was also flanked by hedges and the runners had to jump into the road and then back out of it.

Fence 13 & 29

Height: 4 feet 7 inches (1.40 m)
A plain obstacle that comes at a point when the runners are usually in a good rhythm and thus rarely causes problems.

Fence 14 & 30

Height: 4 feet 6 inches (1.37 m)
The last fence on the final lap and which has often seen very tired horses fall. Despite some tired runners falling on the 30th and appearing injured, no horse deaths have occurred at the 30th fence to date.

On the first lap of the race, runners continue around the course to negotiate two fences which are only jumped once:

Fence 15 – The Chair

Height: 5 feet 2 inches (1.57 m), preceded by a 6 ft (1.83 m) wide ditch
This fence is the site of the accident that claimed the only human life in the National's history: in 1862, Joe Wynne fell here and died from his injuries, although a coroner's inquest revealed that the rider was in a gravely weakened condition through consumption. This brought about the ditch on the take-off side of the fence in an effort to slow the horses on approach. The fence was the location where a distance judge sat in the earliest days of the race. On the second circuit, he would record the finishing order from his position and declare any horse that had not passed him before the previous runner passed the finishing post as "distanced", meaning a non-finisher. The practice was done away with in the 1850s, but the monument where the chair stood is still there. The ground on the landing side is six inches higher than on the takeoff side, creating the opposite effect to the drop at Becher's. The fence was originally known as the Monument Jump, but "The Chair" came into more frequent use in the 1930s. Today it is one of the most popular jumps on the course for spectators.

Fence 16 – Water Jump

Height: 2 feet 6 inches (0.76 m)
Originally a stone wall in the very early Nationals. The Water Jump was one of the most popular jumps on the course, presenting a great jumping spectacle for those in the stands and was always a major feature in the newsreels' coverage of the race. As the newsreels made way for television in the 1960s, so, in turn, did the Water Jump fall under the shadow of its neighbour, The Chair, in popularity as an obstacle.

On the final lap, after the 30th fence, the remaining runners bear right, avoiding The Chair and Water Jump, to head onto a "run-in" to the finishing post. The run-in is not perfectly straight: an "elbow" requires jockeys to make a slight right before finding themselves on the home straight. It is on this run-in—one of the longest in the United Kingdom at 494 yards (452 m)—that some horses have lost their lead, such as Devon Loch in 1956, Crisp in 1973, What's Up Boys in 2002 and Sunnyhillboy in 2012.

== Records ==
Leading horse:

- Red Rum – 3 wins (1973, 1974, 1977)

Leading jockey:

- George Stevens – 5 wins (Freetrader, 1856; Emblem 1863; Emblematic, 1864; The Colonel, 1869, 1870)

Leading trainers:

- George Dockeray – 4 wins (Lottery, 1839; Jerry, 1840; Gaylad, 1842; Miss Mowbray, 1852)
- Fred Rimell – 4 wins (E.S.B., 1956; Nicolaus Silver, 1961; Gay Trip, 1970; Rag Trade, 1976)
- Ginger McCain – 4 wins (Red Rum, 1973, 1974, 1977; Amberleigh House, 2004)
- Willie Mullins – 4 wins (Hedgehunter, 2006; I Am Maximus, 2024, 2026; Nick Rockett, 2025)

Leading owners:

- J. P. McManus – 4 wins (Don't Push It, 2010; Minella Times, 2021; I Am Maximus, 2024, 2026)

- Fastest winning time: Mr Frisk (1990); 8:47.80
- Slowest winning time: Lottery (1839); 14:53
- Oldest winning horse: Peter Simple (1853); aged 15
- Youngest winning horse: Alcibiade (1865), Regal (1876), Austerlitz (1877), Empress (1880), Lutteur III (1909); all aged five
- Oldest winning jockey: Dick Saunders (1982); aged 48
- Youngest winning jockey: Bruce Hobbs (1938); aged 17
- Longest odds winner: Tipperary Tim (1928), Gregalach (1929), Caughoo (1947), Foinavon (1967), Mon Mome (2009); all 100/1
- Shortest odds winner: Poethlyn (1919); 11/4
- Largest field: 66 runners (1929)
- Smallest field: 10 runners (1883)
- Most horses to finish: 23 (1984)
- Fewest horses to finish: 2 (1928)
- Most rides in the race: 21 (Richard Johnson, 1997–2019)
- Most rides without winning: 21 (Richard Johnson, 1997–2019)

== Winners ==
The following table lists the winners of the last ten Grand Nationals:

| Year | Horse | Age | Handicap (st-lb) | Jockey | Trainer | Owner(s) | SP |
|---|---|---|---|---|---|---|---|
| 2026 | I Am Maximus | 10 | 11–12 | Paul Townend | Willie Mullins | J. P. McManus | 9/2 F |
| 2025 | Nick Rockett | 8 | 11–08 | Patrick Mullins | Willie Mullins | Stewart & Sadie Andrew | 33/1 |
| 2024 | I Am Maximus | 8 | 11–06 | Paul Townend | Willie Mullins | J. P. McManus | 7/1 JF |
| 2023 | Corach Rambler | 9 | 10–05 | Derek Fox | Lucinda Russell | The Ramblers | 8/1 F |
| 2022 | Noble Yeats | 7 | 10–10 | Sam Waley-Cohen | Emmet Mullins | Robert Waley-Cohen | 50/1 |
| 2021 | Minella Times | 8 | 10–03 | Rachael Blackmore | Henry de Bromhead | J. P. McManus | 11/1 |
| 2019 | Tiger Roll | 9 | 11–05 | Davy Russell | Gordon Elliott | Gigginstown House Stud | 4/1 F |
| 2018 | Tiger Roll | 8 | 10–13 | Davy Russell | Gordon Elliott | Gigginstown House Stud | 10/1 |
| 2017 | One For Arthur | 8 | 10–11 | Derek Fox | Lucinda Russell | Two Golf Widows | 14/1 |
| 2016 | Rule The World | 9 | 10–07 | David Mullins | Mouse Morris | Gigginstown House Stud | 33/1 |

== Jockeys ==
When the concept of the Grand National was first envisaged it was designed as a race for gentlemen riders, meaning men who were not paid to compete, and while this was written into the conditions of the early races many of the riders who weighed out for the 1839 race were professionals for hire. Throughout the Victorian era the line between the amateur and professional sportsman existed only in terms of the rider's status, and the engagement of an amateur to ride in the race was rarely considered a handicap to a contender's chances of winning. Many gentleman riders won the race before the First World War.

Although the number of amateurs remained high between the wars their ability to match their professional counterparts gradually receded. After the Second World War, it became rare for any more than four or five amateurs to take part in any given year. The last amateur rider to win the Grand National was Mr Patrick Mullins in 2025 aboard Nick Rockett. The penultimate amateur to win the race was Sam Waley-Cohen in 2022 when riding Noble Yeats. By the 21st century, however, openings for amateur riders had become very rare with some years passing with no amateur riders at all taking part. Those that do in the modern era are most usually talented young riders who are often close to turning professional. In the past, such amateur riders would have been joined by army officers, such as David Campbell who won in 1896, and sporting aristocrats, farmers or local huntsmen and point to point riders, who usually opted to ride their own mounts. But all these genres of rider have faded out in the last quarter of a century with no riders of military rank or aristocratic title having taken a mount since 1982.

The Sex Discrimination Act 1975 made it possible for female jockeys to enter the race. The first female jockey to enter the race was Charlotte Brew on the 200/1 outsider Barony Fort in the 1977 race. The first female jockey to complete the race was Geraldine Rees on Cheers in 1982. The 21st century has not seen a significant increase in female riders, but it has seen them gain rides on mounts considered to have a genuine chance of winning. In 2005, Carrie Ford finished fifth on the 8/1 second-favourite Forest Gunner. In 2012, Katie Walsh achieved what was at the time the best result yet for a female jockey, finishing third on the 8/1 joint-favourite Seabass. In 2015, Nina Carberry became the first female jockey to take a fifth ride in the Grand National, her best placing being seventh in 2010. Rachael Blackmore became the first female jockey to win the Grand National aboard Minella Times in 2021.

Professionals now hold dominance in the Grand National, and better training, dietary habits and protective clothing have ensured that riders' careers last much longer and offer more opportunities to ride in the race. Of the 37 riders who have enjoyed 13 or more rides in the race, 19 had their first ride in the 20th century and 11 had careers that continued into or started in the 21st century. Despite that, a long-standing record of 19 rides in the race was set by Tom Olliver back in 1859 and was not equalled until 2014 by A. P. McCoy. This has since been topped by Richard Johnson. Longevity is no guarantee of success, however, as 13 of the 34 never tasted the glory of winning the race. McCoy is the only rider to successfully remove himself from the list after winning at the 15th attempt in 2010. Richard Johnson set a new record of 21 failed attempts to win the race from 1997 to 2019, having finished second twice. The other 16 riders who never won or have not as yet won, having had more than 12 rides in the race, are:

- Tom Scudamore (2001–2022): never in first three in 20 attempts
- Aidan Coleman (2008–2023): finished second once in 15 attempts
- Noel Fehily (2001–2017): never in first three in 15 attempts
- Sam Twiston-Davies (2010 – present): never in first three in 15 attempts
- David Casey (1997–2015): finished third once in 15 attempts
- Jeff King (1964–1980): finished third once in 15 attempts
- Mark Walsh (2009–present): finished second once and third once in 14 attempts
- Graham Bradley (1983–1999): finished second once in 14 attempts
- Bill Parvin (1926–1939): finished second once in 14 attempts
- Robert Thornton (1997–2011): never in first three in 14 attempts
- Andrew Thornton (1996–2016): never in first three in 14 attempts
- Chris Grant (1980–1994): finished second thrice in 13 attempts
- Stan Mellor (1956–1971): finished second once in 13 attempts
- George Waddington (1861–1882): finished second once in 13 attempts
- Walter White (1854–1869): finished second once in 13 attempts
- Denis O'Regan (2007–2022): finished second once in 13 attempts
- David Nicholson (1957–1973): never in first three in 13 attempts

Peter Scudamore technically lined up for thirteen Grand Nationals without winning, but the last of those was the void race of 1993, which meant that he officially competed in twelve Nationals.

Many other well-known jockeys have failed to win the Grand National. These include champion jockeys such as Terry Biddlecombe, John Francome, Josh Gifford, Stan Mellor, Jonjo O'Neill (who never finished the race) and Fred Rimell. Three jockeys who led over the last fence in the National but lost the race on the run-in ended up as television commentators: Lord Oaksey (on Carrickbeg in 1963), Norman Williamson (on Mely Moss in 2000), and Richard Pitman (on Crisp in 1973). Dick Francis also never won the Grand National in 8 attempts, although he did lead over the last fence on Devon Loch in the 1956 race, only for the horse to collapse under him when well in front only 40 yards (37 m) from the winning post. Pitman's son Mark also led over the last fence, only to be pipped at the post when riding Garrison Savannah in 1991. David Dick won the 1956 Grand National on E.S.B. when Devon Loch collapsed. He also holds the record for the number of clear rounds – nine times, though this has been surpassed by Ruby Walsh (11). Since 1986, any jockey making five or more clear rounds has been awarded the Aintree Clear Rounds Award.

== Horse welfare ==
=== Statistics ===
The Grand National has been described by the BBC as higher risk than lots of other horse races. According to the British Horseracing Authority, as of 2022, the five-year average fatality rate for jump racing was 0.43%. However, the rate for the Grand National over the last ten runnings was more than twice as high, at 1.12%. Concerns about the safety of the race's entrants have been present since the National's earliest years. When covering the 1939 race, the Liverpool Mercury wrote that there was "no doubt [the race was] a very exciting spectacle, but we can no more be reconciled to it on that account than we are to cockfighting bull-baiting or any other popular pastime which is attended with the infliction of wanton torture on any living being."

=== History of fatalities ===
During the 1970s and 1980s, the Grand National saw a total of 12 horses die (half of which were at Becher's Brook); in the next 20-year period from 1990 to 2010, when modifications to the course were most significant, there were 17 equine fatalities. The 2011 and 2012 races each yielded two deaths, including one each at Becher's Brook. In 2013, when further changes were made to introduce a more flexible fence structure, there were no fatalities in the race itself, although two horses died in run-up races over the same course. The animal welfare charity League Against Cruel Sports counts the number of horse deaths over the three-day meeting from the year 2000 to 2013 at 40.

There were no equine fatalities in the main Grand National race for seven years until 2019, when one horse died at the first fence. In 2021, one horse was euthanised after the race after suffering an injury on a flat section between fences. Two more were euthanised after suffering injuries in the 2022 event. One of the incidents came at fence 3, the other on the gallop between fences 12 and 13. There was one fatality in 2023, following a fall at the first fence, and two other horses were taken away by ambulance. The involvement of animal rights protesters was questioned after the race. Sandy Thompson, trainer of the fatally injured Hill Sixteen, claimed along with several other racing personalities that the protesters had (directly or indirectly) caused the death of the gelding and were equally responsible for the number of fallers, because the delay they caused to the start, after storming the course close to post time, got the horses worked up and "hyper". The protesters have denied these comments, saying they had every right to break and enter and trespass onto racecourse ground and stage a protest despite officials' orders not to.

In April 2025, animal rights organisations criticised the Grand National after a horse that was leading the race suffered a grim fall, and a second collapsed shortly after the competition.

=== Organiser changes ===
Over the years, Aintree officials have worked in conjunction with animal welfare organisations to reduce the severity of some fences and to improve veterinary facilities. In 2008, a new veterinary surgery was constructed in the stable yard which has two large treatment boxes, an X-ray unit, video endoscopy, equine solarium, and sandpit facilities. Further changes in set-up and procedure allow vets to treat horses more rapidly and in better surroundings. Those requiring more specialist care can be transported by specialist horse ambulances, under police escort, to the nearby Philip Leverhulme Equine Hospital at the University of Liverpool at Leahurst. A mobile on-course X-ray machine assists in the prompt diagnosis of leg injuries when horses are pulled up, and oxygen and water are available by the final fence and finishing post. Five vets remain mobile on the course during the running of the race and can initiate treatment of injured fallers at the fence. Additional vets are stationed at the pull-up area, finishing post, and in the surgery.

Some of the National's most challenging fences have also been modified, while still preserving them as formidable obstacles. After the 1989 Grand National, in which two horses died in incidents at Becher's Brook, Aintree began the most significant of its modifications to the course. The brook on the landing side of Becher's was filled in and, after the 2011 race which also saw an equine fatality at the obstacle, the incline on the landing side was levelled out and the drop on was reduced by between 4 and 5 inches (10–13 cm) to slow the runners. Other fences have also been reduced in height over the years, and the entry requirements for the race have been made stricter. Screening at the Canal Turn now prevents horses from being able to see the sharp left turn and encourages jockeys to spread out along the fence, rather than take the tight left-side route. Additionally, work has been carried out to smooth the core post infrastructure of the fences with protective padding to reduce impact upon contact, and the height of the toe-boards on all fences has been increased to 14 inches (36 cm). These orange-coloured boards are positioned at the base of each fence and provide a clear ground line to assist horses in determining the base of the fence.

Parts of the course were widened in 2009 to allow runners to bypass fences if required. This was utilised for the first time during the 2011 race as casualties at fences 4 and 6 (Becher's Brook) resulted in marshals diverting the remaining contenders around those fences on the final lap.

Some within the horseracing community, including those with notable achievements in the Grand National such as Ginger McCain and Bob Champion, have argued that the lowering of fences and the narrowing of ditches, primarily designed to increase horse safety, has made matters worse by encouraging the runners to race faster.

After the 2023 race, the Jockey Club announced several major changes to the event for 2024, recognising "the need for more substantial updates on several key areas in order to better protect the welfare of racehorses and jockeys". This included a reduction in the size of the field for the first time, from 40 to 34 (long called for by welfare campaigners such as the RSPCA), as well as infrastructure changes such as moving fences to slow the speed of the race at the start, and further development of pre-race veterinary protocols.

== Grand National Legends ==
In 2009, the race sponsors John Smith's launched a poll to determine five personalities to be inducted into the inaugural Grand National Legends initiative. The winners were announced on the day of the 2010 Grand National and inscribed on commemorative plaques at Aintree. They were:

- Ginger McCain and his record three-time winning horse Red Rum;
- John Buckingham and Foinavon, the unlikely winners in 1967;
- Manifesto, who holds the record for most runs in the race, eight including two victories;
- Jenny Pitman, the first woman to train the winner of the race in 1983; and
- Sir Peter O'Sullevan, the commentator who called home the winners of fifty Grand Nationals on radio and television from 1947 to 1997.

A panel of experts also selected three additional legends:

- George Stevens, the record five-time winning rider between 1856 and 1870;
- Captain Martin Becher, who played a major part in bringing the National to Liverpool, rode the winner of the first precursor to the National in 1836 and was the first rider to fall into the brook at the sixth fence, which forever took his name after 1839; and
- Edward Topham, who was assigned the task of framing the weights for the handicap from 1847 and whose descendants played a major role in the race for the next 125 years.

In 2011, nine additional legends were added:

- Bob Champion and Aldaniti, the winners of the 1981 Grand National;
- West Tip, who ran in six consecutive Nationals and won once in 1986;
- Richard Dunwoody, the jockey who rode West Tip and Miinnehoma to victory and who competed in 14 Grand Nationals, being placed in eight;
- Brian Fletcher, a jockey who won the race three times (including Red Rum's first victory in 1973, and finished second once and third three times);
- Vincent O'Brien, who trained three consecutive winners of the race in the 1950s;
- Tom Olliver, who rode in nineteen Nationals, including seventeen consecutively, and won three times, as well as finishing second three times and third once;
- Count Karl Kinsky, the first international winner of the race, and at his first attempt, on board the mare Zoedone in 1883;
- Jack Anthony, three-time winning jockey in 1911, 1915 and 1920; and
- Peter Bromley, the BBC radio commentator who covered 42 Nationals until his retirement in the summer of 2001.

John Smith's also added five "people's legends" who were introduced on Liverpool Day, the first day of the Grand National meeting. The five were:

- Arthur Ferrie, who worked as a groundsman during the 1970s and 1980s;
- Edie Roche, a Melling Road resident, who opened her home to jockeys, spectators and members of the media when the course was evacuated following a bomb threat in 1997;
- Ian Stewart, a fan who had travelled from Coventry every year to watch the race and was attending his fiftieth National in 2010;
- Police Constable Ken Lawson, who was celebrating thirty-one years of service in the mounted section of Merseyside Police and was set to escort his third National winner in 2010; and
- Tony Roberts, whose first visit to the National had been in 1948 and who had steadily spread the word to family and friends about the race, regularly bringing a party of up to thirty people to the course.

A public vote announced at the 2012 Grand National saw five more additions to the Legends hall:

- Fred Winter, who rode two National winners and trained two more;
- Carl Llewellyn, jockey who won two Nationals, on Party Politics in 1992 and Earth Summit in 1998, the latter being the only horse to have won the Grand National and the Scottish and Welsh Nationals;
- Fred Rimell, the trainer of four different National winning horses, including Nicolaus Silver, one of only three greys to have won the race;
- Michael Scudamore, rider in sixteen consecutive Grand Nationals from 1951, finishing first in 1959 and also achieving a second and a third-place;
- Tommy Carberry, the jockey who stopped Red Rum's attempt at a third success in 1975 by winning on L'Escargot, also finished second and third before going on to train the winner in 1999.

The selection panel also inducted three more competitors:

- Tommy Pickernell, who rode in seventeen Grand Nationals in the 19th century and won three. He allegedly turned down a substantial bribe during the 1860 race from the second-placed jockey and instead rode on to win;
- Battleship, the only horse to have won both the Grand National and the American Grand National, and his jockey Bruce Hobbs, who remains the youngest jockey to win the Aintree race;
- George Dockeray, who alongside Ginger McCain and Fred Rimell trained four National winners, starting with Lottery in the first official Grand National in 1839.

== Sponsorship ==
| Period | Sponsor | Branding |
|---|---|---|
| 1975–1977 | News of the World | News of the World Grand National |
| 1978 | The Sun | The Sun Grand National |
| 1979 | Colt Car Company | Colt Car Grand National |
| 1980–1983 | The Sun | The Sun Grand National |
| 1984–1991 | Seagram | Seagram Grand National |
| 1992–2004 | Martell | Martell Grand National |
| 2005–2013 | John Smith's | John Smith's Grand National |
| 2014–2016 | Crabbie's | Crabbie's Grand National |
| 2017–2026 | Randox Health | Randox Health Grand National (2017–2020); Randox Grand National (2021–2026) |
| 2027–present | TBA | TBN |

Since 1984 it has been sponsored by 5 different companies.

== Popular culture ==
In the 1944 movie National Velvet, Elizabeth Taylor plays a young girl who dreams of riding her horse in the Grand National. The movie, which also features Mickey Rooney, won 2 Oscars.

The race features in the 2010 Jilly Cooper novel Jump!, where female jockey Amber Lloyd-Foxe rides the winning horse, Mrs Wilkinson, to victory.

== Notes ==
=== Favourites ===
In the 72 races of the post-war era (excluding the void race in 1993), the favourite or joint-favourite have only won the race thirteen times (in 1950, 1960, 1973, 1982, 1996, 1998, 2005, 2008, 2010, 2019, 2023, 2024 and 2026) and have failed to complete the course in 37 Nationals.

=== Mares ===
Since its inception, 13 mares have won the race, most recently in 1951:

- Charity (1841)
- Miss Mowbray (1852)
- Anatis (1860)
- Jealousy (1861)
- Emblem (1863)
- Emblematic (1864)
- Casse Tete (1872)
- Empress (1880)
- Zoedone (1883)
- Frigate (1889)
- Shannon Lass (1902)
- Sheila's Cottage (1948)
- Nickel Coin (1951)

=== Greys ===
Three greys have won:

- The Lamb (1868, 1871)
- Nicolaus Silver (1961)
- Neptune Collonges (2012)

=== Female jockeys ===
Since 1977, women have ridden in 24 Grand Nationals. Geraldine Rees became the first to complete the course, on Cheers in 1982. In 2012 Katie Walsh became the first female jockey to earn a placed finish in the race, finishing third on Seabass. Rachael Blackmore became the first female jockey to win with Minella Times in 2021.

=== International winners ===
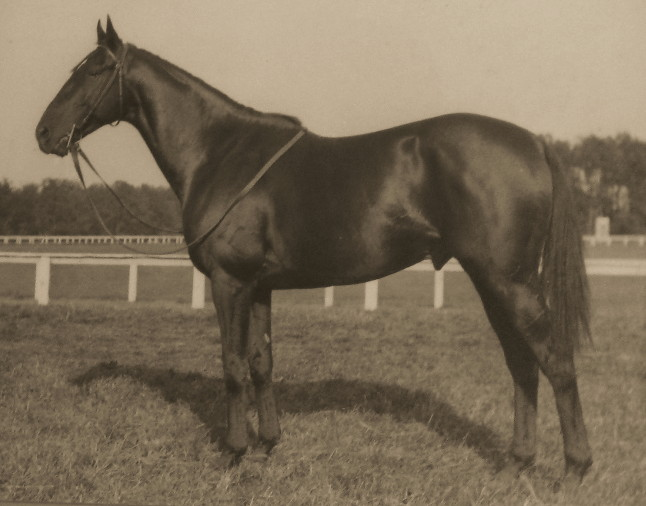
Battleship is the only horse to win both the American Grand National and the English Grand National steeplechase races

- Two French-trained horses have won the Grand National: Huntsman (1862) and Cortolvin (1867). Seven other winners were bred in France — Alcibiade (1865), Reugny (1874), Lutteur III (1909), Mon Mome (2009), Neptune Collonges (2012), Pineau De Re (2014) and I Am Maximus (2024 and 2026).
- (United States) In 1923, Sergeant Murphy became the first U.S.-bred horse to win the race. He is also the joint-second oldest horse to win, at age 13, alongside Why Not (1884). The U.S.-bred Battleship, son of the famous Man o' War, became the first (and so far only) horse to have won both the Grand National (in 1938) and the American Grand National (which he won four years earlier). Both Jay Trump (1965) and Ben Nevis II (1980) won the Maryland Hunt Cup before winning the Grand National.
- Jockey William Watkinson recorded the first riding success for Australia in 1926. He was killed at Bogside, Scotland, less than three weeks after winning the National.
- 1991 was the seventh and final year that the Grand National was sponsored by Seagram. Aptly, the race was won by a horse named Seagram, bred in New Zealand. 1997 saw another New Zealand-bred winner in Lord Gyllene.
- Count Karl Kinsky recorded the first riding success for Austria when he won the 1883 Grand National while riding his own horse Zoedone.

=== Other British winners ===
- (Wales) The only Welsh-trained horse to win was Kirkland in 1905.
- Rubstic, trained by John Leadbetter in Roxburghshire, became the first Scottish-trained winner, with victory in 1979. Two other horses trained in Scotland have won the race, One For Arthur in 2017 and Corach Rambler in 2023, both trained by Lucinda Russell.

=== Irish winners ===
- (Republic of Ireland) Irish-trained horses have enjoyed by far the most success of international participants, with 22 winners since 1900, including fourteen since 1999:

| Year | Horse | Jockey | Trainer | SP |
|---|---|---|---|---|
| 1900 | Ambush II | Algy Anthony | Algy Anthony | 4/1 |
| 1920 | Troytown | Mr. Jack Anthony | Algy Anthony | 6/1 |
| 1939 | Workman | Tim Hyde | Jack Ruttle | 100/8 |
| 1947 | Caughoo | Eddie Dempsey | Herbie McDowell | 100/1 |
| 1953 | Early Mist | Bryan Marshall | Vincent O'Brien | 20/1 |
| 1954 | Royal Tan | Bryan Marshall | Vincent O'Brien | 8/1 |
| 1955 | Quare Times | Pat Taaffe | Vincent O'Brien | 100/9 |
| 1975 | L'Escargot | Tommy Carberry | Dan Moore | 13/2 |
| 1999 | Bobbyjo | Paul Carberry | Tommy Carberry | 10/1 |
| 2000 | Papillon | Ruby Walsh | Ted Walsh | 10/1 |
| 2003 | Monty's Pass | Barry Geraghty | Jimmy Mangan | 16/1 |
| 2005 | Hedgehunter | Ruby Walsh | Willie Mullins | 7/1 F |
| 2006 | Numbersixvalverde | Niall Madden | Martin Brassil | 11/1 |
| 2007 | Silver Birch | Robbie Power | Gordon Elliott | 33/1 |
| 2016 | Rule The World | David Mullins | Mouse Morris | 33/1 |
| 2018 | Tiger Roll | Davy Russell | Gordon Elliott | 10/1 |
| 2019 | Tiger Roll | Davy Russell | Gordon Elliott | 4/1 F |
| 2021 | Minella Times | Rachael Blackmore | Henry de Bromhead | 11/1 |
| 2022 | Noble Yeats | Sam Waley-Cohen | Emmet Mullins | 50/1 |
| 2024 | I Am Maximus | Paul Townend | Willie Mullins | 7/1 JF |
| 2025 | Nick Rockett | Patrick Mullins | Willie Mullins | 33/1 |
| 2026 | I Am Maximus | Paul Townend | Willie Mullins | 9/2 F |

=== Famous owners ===
The 1900 winner Ambush II was owned by HRH Prince of Wales, later to become King Edward VII. In 1950 Queen Elizabeth, the Queen Mother had her first runner in the race in Monaveen, who finished fifth. Six years later she would witness her Devon Loch collapse on the run-in, just yards from a certain victory.

The favourite for the 1968 race, Different Class, was owned by actor Gregory Peck.

The 1963 winner Ayala and the 1976 winner Rag Trade were both part-owned by celebrity hairdresser Raymond Bessone.

1994 winner Miinnehoma was owned by comedian Freddie Starr.

What A Friend ran in 2011 and 2013 when part-owned by Alex Ferguson, the former manager of Manchester United.

== See also ==
- Irish Grand National
- Ulster Grand National
- Scottish Grand National
- Welsh Grand National
- Horse racing in Great Britain
- List of British National Hunt races
