= 1900 Grand National =

English steeplechase horse race

- Grand National
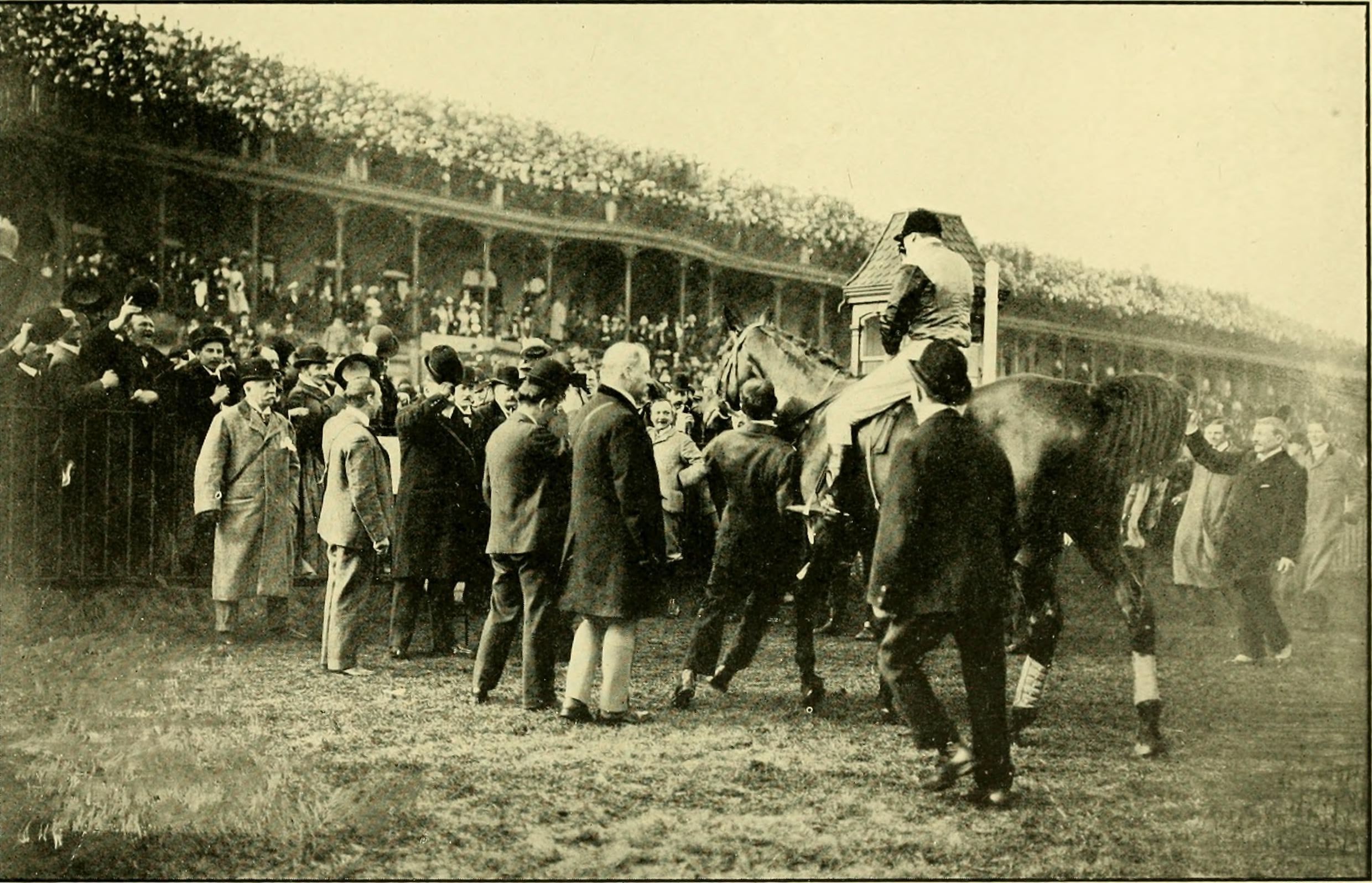
- From King Edward VII. as a sportsman (Alfred Edward Thomas Watson, 1911)
- Location: Aintree
- Date: 30 March 1900
- Winning horse: (Republic of Ireland) Ambush II
- Starting price: 4/1
- Jockey: (Republic of Ireland) Algy Anthony
- Trainer: (Republic of Ireland) Algy Anthony
- Owner: (United Kingdom) HRH Prince of Wales
- Conditions: Good

The 1900 Grand National was the 62nd renewal of the Grand National horse race that took place at Aintree near Liverpool, England, on 30 March 1900.

== Finishing Order ==
| Position | Name | Jockey | Age | Handicap (st-lb) | SP | Distance |
|---|---|---|---|---|---|---|
| 01 | Ambush II | Algy Anthony | 6 | 11-3 | 4/1 | 4 Lengths |
| 02 | Barsac | Bill Halsey | ? | 9-12 | 25/1 | |
| 03 | Manifesto | George Williamson | 12 | 12-13 | 6/1 | |
| 04 | Breemont's Pride | Mr Gwyn Davies | ? | 11-7 | 20/1 | |
| 05 | Levanter | Mcguire | ? | 9-8 | 50/1 | |
| 06 | Grudon | Mr MB Bletsoe | ? | 10-5 | 40/1 | |
| 07 | Easter Ogue | Charles Hogan | ? | 9-13 | 66/1 | |
| 08 | Lotus Lily | Arthur Wood | ? | 9-10 | 25/1 | |
| 09 | Sister Elizabeth | C Clack | ? | 10-0 | 40/1 | |
| 10 | Model | Percy Woodland | ? | 10-7 | 66/1 | |
| 11 | Elliman | Edmund Driscoll | ? | 10-1 | 100/7 | Last to complete |

== Non-finishers ==
| Fence | Name | Jockey | Age | Handicap (st-lb) | SP | Fate |
|---|---|---|---|---|---|---|
| 17 | Hidden Mystery | Charles Nugent | ? | 12-0 | 75/20 | Knocked Over |
| 01 | Covert Hack | Frank Mason | ? | 11-0 | 100/6 | Fell |
| 07 | Alpheus | A Waddington | ? | 10-10 | 40/1 | Fell |
| 16 | Barcalwhey | Tom Lane | ? | 10-0 | 20/1 | Fell |
| 01 | Nothing | William Hoysted | ? | 9-7 | 100/1 | Ran Out |
