= Beltrán Alfonso Osorio, 18th Duke of Alburquerque =

18th duke of Alburquerque

The Most Excellent Beltrán Alfonso Osorio 18th Duke of Alburquerque GE OSL

Head of the Household of the Count of Barcelona
- In office 1954–1993
- Monarch: Infante Juan, Count of Barcelona

Personal details
- Born: Beltrán Alfonso Osorio y Díez de Rivera; 15 December 1918 Madrid, Spain
- Died: 7 February 1994 (aged 75) Madrid, Spain
- Spouses: Teresa Beltrán de Lis y Pidal (m. 1952; died 1969) María Cristina Malcampo y San Miguel, 15th Duchess of Parque (m. 1974)
- Children: Juan Miguel Osorio y Beltrán de Lis, 19th Duke of Alburquerque; Teresa Osorio y Beltrán de Lis; María Osorio y Bertrán de Lis; María Cristina Osorio y Malcampo, 8th Duchess of San Lorenzo de Valhermoso; María Rosa Osorio y Malcampo, 16th Duchess of Parque

Beltrán Alfonso Osorio y Díez de Rivera, 18th Duke of Alburquerque, GE, OSL (15 December 1918 – 7 February 1994), also known as the 'Iron Duke' of Alburquerque, was a Spanish peer and jockey. A profound monarchist, he was a close friend and confidant of the heir to the throne of Spain, the Count of Barcelona, whom he served as the Head of his Household from 1954 to 1993.

Beltrán was born in Madrid to one of the great noble houses of Spain. At its peak, the House of Alburquerque held 18 titles in the peerage of Spain, 6 of which had the status of Grandee. His father, Miguel Osorio y Martos, 17th Duke of Alburquerque, was Gentilhombre Grandee of king Alfonso XIII while his mother was Inés Díez de Rivera y Figueroa, daughter of the Counts of Almodóvar, also Grandees of Spain. The closeness of the Dukes of Alburquerque to the kings of Spain had existed for many generations; the 8th, 15th and 16th duke had all been Mayordomos mayores or Heads of the Royal Household. Aspiring to become an engineer was soon frustrated by the outbreak of the Spanish Civil War in 1936, which resulted in his enlistment in the cavalry of the nationalist faction, eventually becoming lieutenant colonel.

His passion for equestrianism emerged after he was given his first pony age 5. On his 8th birthday, his father gifted him with a newsreel clip of the 1926 Grand National. He thereafter became enthusiastic with the idea of competing in it. The duke quickly became one of the promising horse riders of his home club, Puerta de Hierro, rising to prominence when he competed at the 1952 Summer Olympics and later at the 1960 Summer Olympics. His jockey career began when he came second in the Sussex Stakes at Lingfield Park. Despite the duke's unhelpfully tall physique, he finally rode the Grand National as "gentleman rider" in 1952. Osorio also took part in 1963, 1965, 1966, 1973, when he already had 16 bone screws; in 1974, when he finished in a respectable 8th place; and aged 58 in 1976, breaking 7 ribs and vertebrae, his right wrist and femur as well as suffering a severe concussion that gave him a two-day coma. As a result, the Jockey Club stewards declined to renew his riding permit and it was widely said that should he continue, "the hospital would run out of screws and the duke out of legs".

The Duke of Alburquerque continued riding in Europe until he was 65. He retired leaving behind an extremely popular legacy, particularly in Britain, where he is remembered for his "courageous and injury-defying performances" at Aintree in which he and his horse "Nereo" became fundamental. On his death in 1994, a racing journalist described him as "an immensely popular character in British racing who cut the distinctive figure of being a tall, slender man with the nose and prominent chin of the traditional Spanish Grandee, closely resembling a Punch cartoon."

== Biography ==
He was born in Madrid, his parents being Miguel Osorio y Martos, 17th Duke of Alburquerque, and Inés Díez de Rivera y Figueroa, daughter of the 5th Count of Almodóvar, who was also a Grandee.

In 1936, when he had not yet reached the legal age, he participated in the Spanish Civil War, on the Battle of Somosierra, later fighting in the Infantry Regiment of Navarre, at the command of the 4th Company of the Tercio de San Fermín, later passing to the Cavalry Regiment of the Army of the centre. At the end of the war, he entered the General Military Academy, from which he left with the rank of lieutenant.

From 1954, and until 1993, he held the position of Head of the House of the Count of Barcelona, and for his service and dedication Juan Carlos I of Spain made him a knight of the Order of the Golden Fleece.

=== Jockey career ===
Racing colours of the Duke of Alburquerque

The duke became obsessed with winning Britain's Grand National Steeplechase horse race after watching a film of the race on his eighth birthday. However, each of his attempts ended in failure.

On his first attempt in 1952, he fell from his horse, waking up later in hospital with a cracked vertebra. He tried to win again in 1963, and fell from his horse yet again. (Bookies placed a bet of 66–1 against him finishing still on the horse). He raced again in 1965, but again fell from his horse after it collapsed underneath him, breaking his leg.

In 1974, after having sixteen screws removed from a leg he had broken after falling in another race, he also fell while training for the Grand National and broke his collarbone. He then competed in a plaster cast in the race, this time managing to finish, but only in eighth place.

In 1976, the duke fell again during the race, this time being trampled by other horses. He suffered seven broken ribs, several broken vertebrae, a broken wrist, a broken thigh, and a severe concussion which left him in a coma for two days.

At 57, the Iron Duke still tried to compete, but officials revoked his licence for "his own safety". He never won the Grand National, but broke more bones than any other jockey in attempting to do so.

=== Legacy ===
Alburquerque died in February 1994. His eldest son and heir, Juan Miguel Osorio y Bertrán de Lis (b. 1958), succeeded him as Duke of Alburquerque and most of his other titles in November of that year.

Jaime Peñafiel, a prominent journalist and lawyer in Spain, wrote of him at his death:

Although generalising always runs the risk of being unfair and even offending by exclusion, I cannot resist the temptation to describe the death of the Duke of Alburquerque as that of the last Spanish gentleman. Understanding by such the preconceived image that one has of a gentleman. Whether born in Spain or the United Kingdom: tall, thin like an El Greco character, elegant like an English lord, polite, kind and loyal. In Britain, the Duke of Alburquerque was simply known as "The Gentleman." A gentleman of bow and heel-click. Don Beltrán (he could not be called otherwise) Osorio y Díez de Rivera also responded to the image that Montesquieu had of a great lord: «A man who sees the king, speaks with the ministers, has ancestors and properties.

=== Marriage and issue ===
He married firstly, in the Church of Saint Anthony of the Germans in Madrid on 2 October 1952, Teresa Bertrán de Lis y Pidal (1923–1969), daughter of Vicente Carlos Luis Bertrán de Lis y Gurowski, 2nd Marquess of Bondad Real (himself a grandchild of Infanta Isabel Fernanda of Spain), and his wife María de la Concepción Pidal y Chico de Guzmán, of the House of the Marquesses of Pidal. She died in a car crash when her vehicle collided with that of Ramfis Trujillo, playboy son of Dominican dictator Rafael Trujillo, who would die a few days later. There were three children by this first marriage:

- Juan Miguel Osorio y Bertrán de Lis, 19th Duke of Alburquerque, who continues the line.
- Teresa Osorio y Bertrán de Lis (b. 1962).
- María Osorio y Bertrán de Lis (b. 1966), 14th Countess of Villaumbrosa.

He married secondly, in Estoril on 27 June 1974, María Cristina Malcampo y San Miguel (1935–2004), 15th Duchess of Parque, 7th Duchess of San Lorenzo de Valhermoso, 9th Marchioness of Casa Villavicencio, 9th Marchioness of San Rafael, 4th Countess of Joló, 3rd Viscountess of Mindanao, twice Grandee of Spain. There were two children by this second marriage:

- María Cristina Osorio y Malcampo (b. 1975), 8th Duchess of San Lorenzo de Valhermoso, 5th Countess of Joló, 4th Viscountess of Mindanao and 10th Marchioness of Casa Villavicencio.
- María Rosa Osorio y Malcampo (*b. 1978), 16th Duchess of Parque and 10th Marchioness of San Rafael.

== Titles and honours ==
=== Dukedoms ===
- 18th Duke of Alburquerque (GE)
- 7th Duke of Algete (GE)

=== Marquessates ===
- 19th Marquess of Alcañices (GE)
- 11th Marquess of Balbases (GE)
- 13th Marquess of Cadreita
- 17th Marquess of Cuéllar
- 9th Marquess of Cullera
- 13th Marquess of Montaos

=== Countships ===
- 12th Count of la Corzana (GE)
- 16th Count of Fuensaldaña
- 16th Count of Grajal
- 18th Count of Huelma
- 18th Count of Ledesma
- 15th Count of la Torre
- 14th Count of Villanueva de Cañedo
- 12th Count of Villaumbrosa

=== Honours ===
- (Spain) House of Bourbon: Knight of the Order of the Golden Fleece (1993)
- (Spain) House of Bourbon: Knight of the Order of Santiago (1982)
- (Spain) House of Bourbon: Knight Grand Cross of Justice of the Order of Saint Lazarus
- Spain: Knight of the Order of Sports Merit

== Heraldry ==
Heraldry of Beltrán Alfonso Osorio, 18th Duke of Alburquerque

Coat of Arms as Duke of Alburquerque (1942–1994)

== Bibliography ==
- Hidalgos de España, Real Asociación de (2018). Elenco de Grandezas y Títulos Nobiliarios Españoles. Ediciones Hidalguía. ISBN 978-84-94841-02-6.
- Hobbs, Nicolas (2007). "Grandes de España" (in Spanish).
- de Salazar y Acha, Jaime (1997). "Los Osorio, un linaje de más de mil años". Anales. 4. Real Academia Matritense de Heráldica y Genealogía: 181–182.

Spanish nobility
| Preceded by Miguel Osorio | Duke of Alburquerque; 1942–1994 | Succeeded by Juan Miguel Osorio |
