= 1973 Grand National =

Horse race at Aintree Racecourse

- Grand National
- Location: Aintree
- Date: 31 March 1973
- Winning horse: (England) Red Rum
- Starting price: 9/1 JF
- Jockey: (England) Brian Fletcher
- Trainer: (England) Ginger McCain
- Owner: (England) Noel Le Mare
- Conditions: Good to Firm

External videos
- The 1973 Grand National in full (BBC)

The 1973 Grand National was the 127th renewal of the Grand National horse race that took place at the Aintree Racecourse near Liverpool, England, on 31 March 1973.

The race is best remembered for being the first of Red Rum's three Grand National wins; Red Rum also broke the record set by Reynoldstown in 1935, and in doing so staged a spectacular comeback to beat Crisp on the run-in after having trailed by 15 lengths at the final fence.

Just a furlong to run now, 200 yards now for Crisp, and Red Rum is still closing on him! Crisp is getting very tired, and Red Rum is pounding after him. Red Rum is the one who's finishing the strongest. He's going to get up! Red Rum is going to win the National. At the line Red Rum has just snatched it from Crisp!

— Commentator Peter O'Sullevan describes the climax of the 1973 National

Before the off, Red Rum was 9/1 joint-favourite with Crisp to win the race. However, by the time the runners had reached The Chair the Australian chaser Crisp, who was carrying the top weight of 12 stone, had already built up a significant lead and appeared unstoppable. For much of the initial stages, Crisp's closest challenger was Bill Shoemark on Grey Sombrero, but he fell at The chair, giving Crisp an even greater lead which had grown to 20 lengths by the end of the first circuit.

Crisp's jockey Richard Pitman later recalled that at Becher's Brook on the second circuit, fallen jockey David Nicholson shouted at him: "Richard, you're 33 lengths clear, kick on and you'll win!" At the same time, he heard the Tannoy commentator Michael O'Hehir declare: "And Red Rum is coming out of the pack, Brian Fletcher is kicking him hard!"

At the 30th and final fence, Crisp was still 15 lengths ahead of Red Rum, ridden by Fletcher and given 10 stone 5 lb by the handicapper. However, Crisp was beginning to tire badly on the 494-yard run-in, carrying 23 lb more than his nearest rival. Red Rum made up considerable ground, and two strides from the finishing post he pipped Crisp by a mere three-quarters of a length in a record time of nine minutes, 1.9 seconds (a record which would stand until 1990).

The third horse, L'Escargot, who would win the National two years later, was 25 lengths adrift at the finish.

There was one equine fatality during the race when Grey Sombrero fell at The chair whilst leading the pursuit of Crisp. He suffered a broken leg and was euthanised, becoming the first fatal casualty of the Grand National since Racoon in 1970. Grey Sombrero is one of three horses to have been fatally injured while jumping The chair in the Grand National (the others were Land Lark in 1975 and Kintai in 1979).

1973 is often considered among the greatest Grand Nationals of all time, and the dramatic final-stretch battle between the two greats Crisp and Red Rum has also been described as one of the greatest sporting moments.

== Finishing order ==
Position	Name	Jockey	Age	Handicap (st-lb)	SP	Distance
01	Red Rum	Brian Fletcher	8	10-5	9/1	¾ Length
02	Crisp	Richard Pitman	10	12-0	9/1	25 Lengths
03	L'Escargot	Tommy Carberry	10	12-0	11/1	
04	Spanish Steps	Philip Blacker	10	11-13	16/1	
05	Rouge Autumn	Ken White	9	10-0	40/1	
06	Hurricane Rock	Bob Champion	9	10-0	100/1	
07	Proud Tarquin	John Oaksey	10	10-11	22/1	
08	Prophecy	Bob Davies	10	10-3	20/1	
09	Endless Folly	Joe Guest	11	10-0	100/1	
10	Black Secret	Sean Barker	9	11-2	22/1	
11	Petruchio's Son	David Mould	10	10-5	50/1	
12	The Pooka	Arthur Moore	11	10-0	100/1	
13	Great Noise	David Cartwright	9	10-2	50/1	
14	Green Plover	Mouse Morris	13	10-0	100/1	
15	Sunny Lad	Bill Smith	9	10-3	25/1	
16	Go-Pontinental	Jimmy McNaught	13	10-4	100/1	
17	Mill Door	Peter Cullis	11	10-5	100/1	Last to finish

== Non-finishers ==
Fence	Name	Jockey	Age	Handicap (st-lb)	Starting price	Fate
01	Richeleau	Neil Kernick	9	10-0	50/1	Fell
03	Ashville	Jeff King	8	10-4	14/1	Fell
06	Beggar's Way	Tommy Kinane	9	10-1	33/1	Fell
06	Culla Hill	Norton Brookes	9	10-7	100/1	Fell
07	Mr Vimy	Johnny Haine	10	10-2	100/1	Pulled Up
07	Swan Shot	Martin Blackshaw	10	10-0	100/1	Refused
08	Nereo	Duke of Alburquerque	7	10-3	66/1	Pulled Up
09	Highland Seal	David Nicholson	10	10-6	20/1	Pulled Up
15	Canharis	Pat Buckley	8	10-1	16/1	Brought Down
15	Charley Winking	Derrick Scott	8	10-0	100/1	Fell
15	Glenkiln	Jonjo O'Neill	10	10-7	33/1	Fell
15	Grey Sombrero	Bill Shoemark	9	10-9	25/1	Fell
15	Proud Percy	Richard Evans	10	10-0	100/1	Fell
19	Fortune Bay II	George Sloan	9	10-3	66/1	Fell
19	Rough Silk	Tim Norman	10	10-0	66/1	Pulled Up
21	Tarquin Bid	J Bracken	9	10-0	100/1	Fell
22	Beau Parc	Andy Turnell	10	10-1	100/1	Pulled Up
26	Astbury	Jimmy Bourke	10	10-2	50/1	Pulled Up
27	General Symons	Pat Kiely	10	10-0	33/1	Pulled Up
27	Princess Camilla	Ron Barry	8	10-4	16/1	Refused
27	Rampsman	David Munro	9	10-0	100/1	Pulled Up

== Media coverage and aftermath ==
David Coleman presented the BBC's coverage in a special edition of Grandstand. Grandstand would also show the international rugby union match between Scotland and The President's XV from Murrayfield, along with a preview of the big heavyweight bout from San Diego between Muhammad Ali and Ken Norton, that was shown later on BBC 1 in a Sportsnight special.

Unfortunately, Grey Sombrero, who had fallen at the 15th fence was badly injured and had to be euthanized.
