= Waterloo Hotel =

Hotel in Edinburgh, Scotland

Coordinates: 55°57′14″N 3°11′13″W

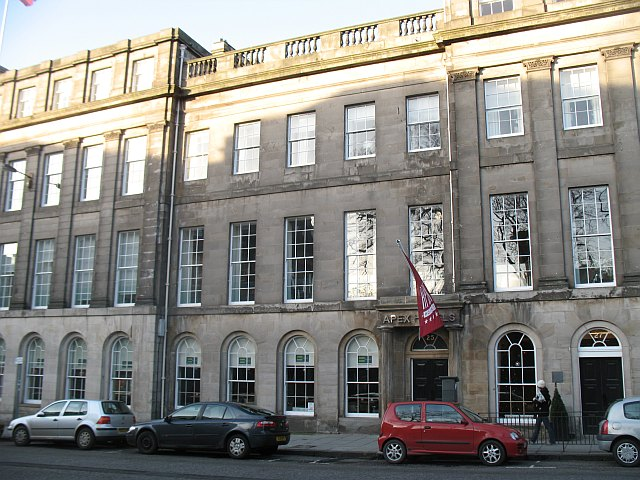
Apex Waterloo Place Hotel, 2009

The Waterloo Hotel is a historical hotel located on Waterloo Place in Edinburgh, Scotland. It was the first large scale purpose built hotel in Edinburgh, trading from 1819 to 1898.

== The Waterloo Hotel, Tavern and Coffee House ==
The category A listed Georgian building was designed by the Scottish architect Archibald Elliot (1761-1823) and constructed between 1815 and 1819. It contained fifty bedrooms, a coffee room, three dining rooms and a large ballroom (80 by 40 feet (24 by 12 m)). In the 1970s, long after the hotel ceased trading, the ballroom was demolished to accommodate an extension, but the cupola (domed window in the ceiling), which would have filled the ballroom with light, has been preserved and can still be seen on the 8th floor of the building.

== Notable guests and events ==
- The Waterloo Hotel opened on Saturday 21 August 1819 to commemorate the visit of Prince Leopold of Saxe-Coburg. He was in the first carriage ever to travel down Waterloo Place.
- Charles Grey, 2nd Earl Grey (Earl Grey) was given the Freedom of the City at a ceremony at the Waterloo Hotel in 1834.
- A large-scale breakfast was held at the Waterloo Hotel in 1834 to celebrate abolition of slavery.
- The Grand Caledondian Curling Club was formed during meetings at the Waterloo Hotel in 1838.
- Asa Gray, the famous American botanist and friend of Charles Darwin, stayed in the hotel in 1839 and described it as 'the finest hotel I have seen yet' in his journal.
- Charles Dickens stayed at the hotel many times during 1861, at the time he was writing Great Expectations and A Tale of Two Cities. Evidence can be found of this in letters written by Dickens while staying at the hotel.
- In 1898 the hotel ceased trading and was turned into offices. It remained as offices for the next 120 years, until it was re-developed by Apex Hotels in 2009 as the Apex Waterloo Place Hotel.
