= Peter O'Sullevan =

Irish-British horse racing commentator (1918–2015)

Sir Peter O'Sullevan CBE
- Born: 3 March 1918; Newcastle, County Down, Ireland
- Died: 29 July 2015 (aged 97); Chelsea, London, England
- Education: The Hawthorns School; Charterhouse
- Alma mater: Collège Alpin International Beau Soleil
- Occupation: Sports commentator
- Employer: BBC
- Spouse: Patricia Duckworth (m. 1947; died 2010)
- Awards: Knight Bachelor (1997)

Sir Peter O'Sullevan CBE (3 March 1918 – 29 July 2015) was an Irish-British horse racing commentator for the BBC, and a correspondent for the Press Association, the Daily Express, and Today. He was the BBC's leading horse racing commentator from 1947 to 1997, during which time he described some of the greatest moments in the history of the Grand National.

== Early life ==
The son of Colonel John Joseph O'Sullevan DSO, resident magistrate at Killarney, and Vera (née Henry), Peter O'Sullevan was born in Newcastle, County Down before returning as an infant to his parents' home at Kenmare, County Kerry; he was brought up in Surrey, England. He was educated at The Hawthorns School, Charterhouse, and later at Collège Alpin International Beau Soleil in Switzerland.

== Career ==
O'Sullevan was involved, in the late 1940s, in some of the earliest television commentaries on any sport, and made many radio commentaries in his earlier years (including the Grand National before it was televised for the first time in 1960). On television, he commentated on many of the major events of the racing year, including the Cheltenham Festival until 1994, The Derby until 1979, and the Grand National, Royal Ascot and Glorious Goodwood until he retired in 1997. During his career, he commentated on around 30 runnings of the Prix de l'Arc de Triomphe in Paris and racing from the United States and Ireland as well as trotting from Rome during the 1960s.

He's getting the most tremendous cheer from the crowd. They're willing him home now. The 12-year-old Red Rum, being preceded only by loose horses, being chased by Churchtown Boy. Eyecatcher has moved into third. The Pilgarlic is fourth. They're coming to the elbow, there's a furlong now between Red Rum and his third Grand National triumph! And he's coming up to the line, to win it like a fresh horse in great style. It's hats off and a tremendous reception, you've never heard one like it at Liverpool. Red Rum wins the National.

— O'Sullevan commentates as Red Rum secures his unprecedented third Grand National victory in 1977

Jockey colours

During his 50 years of commentating on the Grand National, O'Sullevan commentated on numerous historic victories. These included Bob Champion's run on Aldaniti in 1981 after recovering from cancer, 100/1 outsider Foinavon's win in 1967, and the three-times winner Red Rum in 1973, 1974 and 1977. He also commentated on the 1993 Grand National, which was declared void after 30 of the 39 runners failed to realise there had been a false start, and seven went on to complete the course. As the runners approached the second-last fence in the so-called "race that never was", O'Sullevan declared it "the greatest disaster in the history of the Grand National."

O'Sullevan became known as the "Voice of Racing". In a television interview before his 50th and last Grand National in 1997, he revealed that his commentary binoculars came from a German submarine. He was knighted the same year – the only sports broadcaster at that time to have been bestowed that honour. O'Sullevan was also a racehorse owner, including of Be Friendly, who won the King's Stand Stakes at Ascot, and Prix de l'Abbaye de Longchamp. He was twice successful in the Haydock Sprint Cup (then Vernons Sprint) in 1966 and 1967. Another horse he owned was Attivo, whose victory in the 1974 Triumph Hurdle at the Cheltenham Festival was described by O'Sullevan as the most difficult race to call. After passing the line, O'Sullevan uttered: "And it's first Attivo, owned by, uh, Peter O'Sullevan... trained by Cyril Mitchell and ridden by Robert Hughes."

Attivo also won the Chester Cup and the Northumberland Plate during the 1970s. O'Sullevan's final race commentary came at Newbury for the 1997 Hennessy Gold Cup, and he visited the winners' enclosure as a winning owner in the race which followed courtesy of Sounds Fyne's victory in the Fulke Walwyn Chase. He was succeeded as the BBC's lead commentator by Jim McGrath.

After his retirement, O'Sullevan was actively involved in charity work fundraising for causes which revolve around the protection of horses and farm animals, including the International League for the Protection of Horses (ILPH), the Thoroughbred Rehabilitation Centre and Compassion in World Farming. The National Hunt Challenge Chase Cup (run at the Cheltenham Festival) was named after him in 2008 to celebrate his 90th birthday. In 2010, Aintree Racecourse named O'Sullevan as one of the eight inaugural "Grand National Legends". His name is inscribed on a commemorative plaque at the course, alongside the likes of Ginger McCain and Captain Martin Becher.

== Personal life and death ==
O'Sullevan met his wife Patricia, daughter of Frank Duckworth of Manitoba, Canada, at a ball in Manchester in 1947. She died of Alzheimer's disease in 2010.

O'Sullevan died from lung cancer at his flat in Chelsea, London, on 29 July 2015, aged 97.
