= Red Rum =

Irish-bred Thoroughbred racehorse

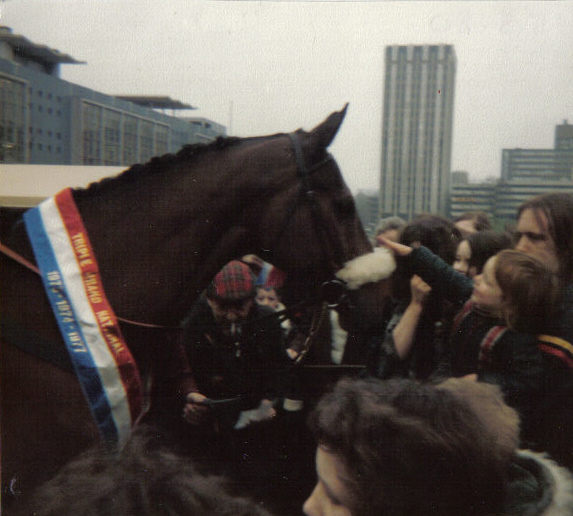
- Red Rum in 1981
- Sire: Quorum
- Grandsire: Vilmorin
- Dam: Mared
- Damsire: Magic Red
- Sex: Gelding
- Foaled: 3 May 1965
- Died: 18 October 1995
- Country: Ireland
- Colour: Bay
- Breeder: Martyn McEnery
- Owner: Noel le Mare
- Trainer: Ginger McCain
- Record: 100: 24-15-23
- Earnings: £146,409.80

Major wins
- Grand National (1973, 1974, 1977); Scottish National (1974)

Honours
- Life-size statue at Aintree Racecourse; Smaller bronze statue inside Wayfarers Arcade, Southport; Red Rum Handicap Chase at Aintree
- Last updated on 15 February 2009

Red Rum (3 May 1965 – 18 October 1995) was an Irish-bred champion Thoroughbred steeplechaser racehorse. He achieved an unmatched historic treble when he won the Grand National in 1973, 1974 and 1977, and came second in the two intervening years, 1975 and 1976. The Grand National is a notoriously difficult race that has been described as "the ultimate test of a horse’s courage". He was also renowned for his jumping ability, having not fallen in 100 races.

The 1973 race in which Red Rum secured his comeback victory from 30 lengths behind is often considered one of the greatest Grand Nationals in history. In a 2002 UK poll, Red Rum's historic third triumph in the Grand National was voted the 24th greatest sporting moment of all time.

== Early life ==
Red Rum was bred at Rossenarra stud in Kells, County Kilkenny, Ireland, by Martyn McEnery. His sire was Quorum (1954–1971), and his dam Mared (1958–1976). Mared was a granddaughter of the broodmare Batika, whose other descendants have included the Irish 2000 Guineas winner Turtle Island. McEnery gave Red Rum his name by taking the last three letters of the names of his dam and sire, respectively. Bred to win one-mile races, Red Rum won his National titles over the longest distance, four miles and four furlongs.In 1967, he started his career in England running in low-value races as a sprinter and dead-heated in his first race, a five-furlong flat race at Aintree Racecourse. He ran another seven times as a two-year-old, winning over 7f at Warwick, and over the same distance at Doncaster in the first of his two races as a three-year-old. In his early career, he was twice ridden by Lester Piggott. The comedian Lee Mack, then a stable boy, had his first riding lesson on Red Rum.

After moving between several training yards, he found his footing when Southport car dealer Ginger McCain bought him for client Noel le Mare and famously trained him on the sands at Southport, England. Galloping through sea water may have proved highly beneficial to Red Rum's hooves. McCain reportedly took Red Rum for a therapeutic swim in the sea off Southport before his first National appearances to help treat the horse's pedal osteitis, a debilitating, incurable bone disease in his hoof. McCain also won the Grand National in 2004 with Amberleigh House, 31 years after his first victory with Red Rum.

== Grand National record ==
The crowd are willing him home now. The 12-year-old Red Rum, being preceded only by loose horses, being chased by Churchtown Boy... They're coming to the elbow, just a furlong now between Red Rum and his third Grand National triumph! It's hats off and a tremendous reception, you've never heard one like it at Liverpool – Red Rum wins the National!

— Commentator Peter O'Sullevan describes the moment Red Rum sealed his third Grand National title

At the 1973 Grand National, Red Rum beat the Australian chaser Crisp, which was carrying 23 pounds more, in a new record time of nine minutes, 1.9 seconds. Crisp led the field virtually all the way in that year's National in which he was 30 lengths clear, and at the last fence was 15 lengths clear of Red Rum, his nearest pursuer. Red Rum and jockey Brian Fletcher, however, made up the ground on the final stretch and, two strides from the finishing post, pipped the tiring Crisp to win by three-quarters of a length in what is often considered one of the greatest Grand Nationals in history. Crisp's jockey Richard Pitman later stated: "I still dream about that race, of Crisp running so strongly and jumping so fearlessly, and then the sound of Red Rum's hooves as he got closer and closer at the end." He added: "I felt as though I was tied to a railway line with an express train thundering up and being unable to jump out of the way." A year later, Red Rum retained his title at the 1974 National, carrying 12 stone. (He followed that with victory in the Scottish Grand National, and remains the only horse to win both in the same season.)

Red Rum came second in 1975 and 1976; Tommy Stack replaced Fletcher as jockey in the 1976 race after Fletcher angered trainer Ginger McCain by telling the press the horse no longer felt right after a defeat in a race away from Aintree. Again, Red Rum saved his best for Aintree but was held off by Rag Trade. The following year, Stack rode the 12-year-old Red Rum to his record third Grand National triumph, in what is regarded as one of the greatest moments in horse racing history.

== Retirement ==
Red Rum was prepared for a sixth attempt at the Grand National the season following his 1977 win, but suffered a hairline fracture in the lead up to the 1978 race. Following a canter at Aintree Racecourse the day before the 1978 Grand National he was retired. The news of Red Rum's retirement was the lead story on that night's Nine O'Clock News on BBC1 and was also front-page news of the following morning's newspapers.

Red Rum had become a national celebrity, opening supermarkets and annually leading the Grand National parade for many further years. His likeness graced playing cards, mugs, posters, models, paintings, plates and jigsaw puzzles. Several books have been written about Red Rum by his trainer, sculptor, jockeys and author Ivor Herbert; a children's story about his life was also written by Christine Pemberton. The horse helped open the Steeplechase rollercoaster at Blackpool Pleasure Beach in 1977. He also switched on the Blackpool Illuminations that year. In 1975, a song entitled "Red Rum" was issued as a tribute to him by a group named Chaser, on Polydor 2058 564. It was written by Steve Jolley, Richard Palmer and Tony Swain. In 2010 the name of the racecourse bar, formerly called "The Sefton", was changed to "The Red Rum".

In 1977 Red Rum appeared as a studio guest at the BBC Sports Personality of the Year awards ceremony. Viewers were delighted when the horse seemed to recognise the voice of his jockey Tommy Stack, who was appearing by video link from another location.

== Death and legacy ==
Red Rum's feats, of three Nationals and two seconds, are legendary. They will never be equalled, let alone surpassed. They say records are there to be broken, but Red Rum’s at Aintree is one which will stand the test of time.

— 20-time champion jockey Tony McCoy

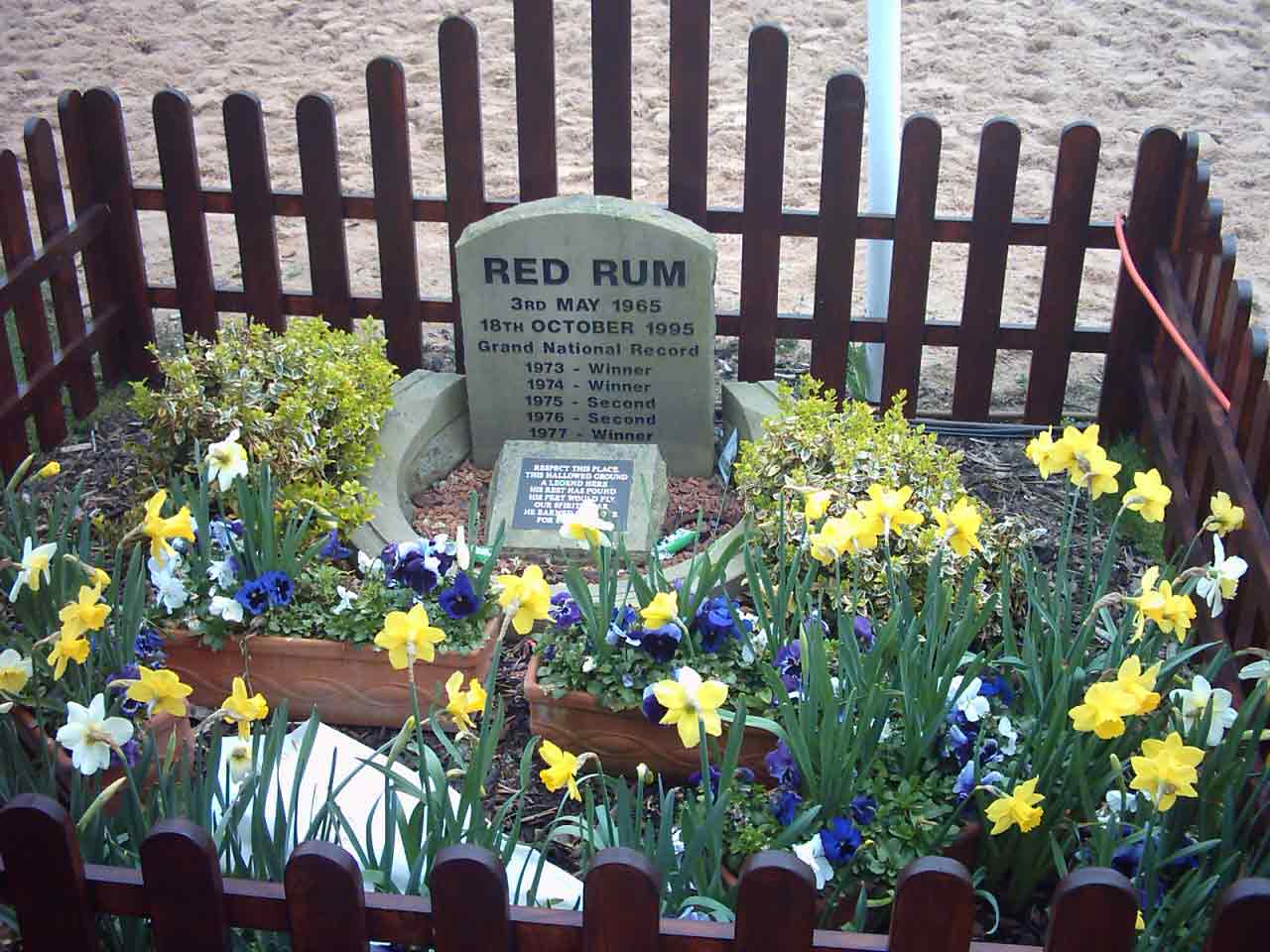
Red Rum's grave at Aintree

Red Rum died on 18 October 1995, aged 30. His death was one of the lead items in television news bulletins and also made the front pages of national newspapers the next day.

He was buried at the winning post of the Aintree Racecourse, which is still a destination for his fans. The epitaph reads

Respect this place
This hallowed ground
A legend here
His rest has found
His feet would fly
Our spirits soar
He earned our love
For evermore

Eleven years after his death, a survey found he remained the best-known racehorse in the UK. When asked to name an equine animal, Red Rum was named by 45% of Britons, with Black Beauty (from Anna Sewell's novel) in second with 33%. In 2002 the UK public voted Red Rum's third Grand National win #24 in the list of the 100 Greatest Sporting Moments.

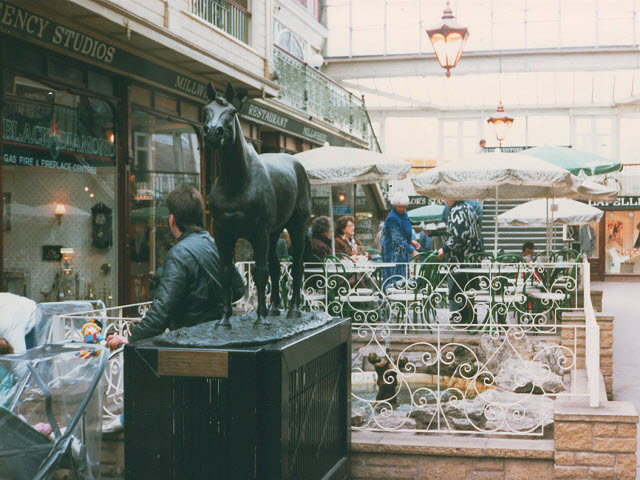
Red Rum statue in Southport

In the early 1970s, the future running of the Grand National was uncertain. The emergence of Red Rum and his historic triumphs captivated the nation, and ensured huge public support for the fund to buy Aintree and put it in the hands of the Jockey Club.

On 19 September 2011, Red Rum's trainer Ginger McCain died aged 80.

== Grand National record ==
Grand National	Position	Jockey	Age	Weight	SP	Distance
1973	1st	Brian Fletcher	8	10–5	9/1 JF	Won by ¾ Length
1974	1st	Brian Fletcher	9	12–0	11/1	
1975	2nd	Brian Fletcher	10	12–0	7/2 F	
1976	2nd	Tommy Stack	11	11–10	10/1	
1977	1st	Tommy Stack	12	11–8	9/1 JF	Won by 25 lengths

== Commemorations ==
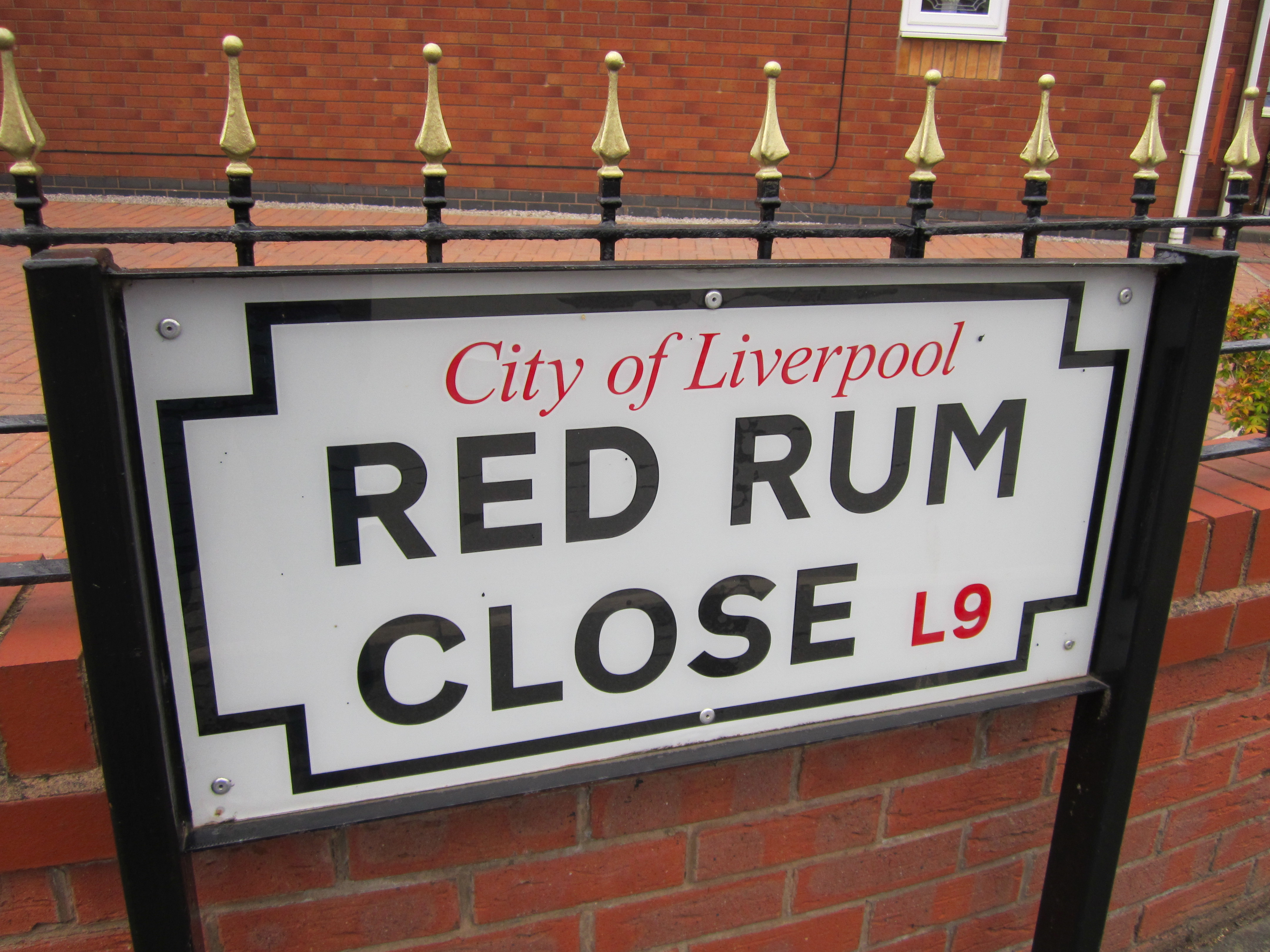
Sign for Red Rum Close, Fazakerley

- Red Rum Handicap Chase at Aintree.
- There are statues of Red Rum at Aintree Racecourse, in Southport and at Ayr Racecourse.
- Merseyrail named one of its trains in Red Rum's honour in 2008 as part of a Merseyside Legends programme.

== Pedigree ==
Pedigree of Red Rum (IRE), bay gelding, 1965
Sire Quorum (GB) 1954	Vilmorin (GB); 1943	Gold Bridge	Golden Boss
Sire Quorum (GB) 1954	Vilmorin (GB); 1943	Gold Bridge	Flying Diadem
Sire Quorum (GB) 1954	Vilmorin (GB); 1943	Queen of the Meadows	Fairway
Sire Quorum (GB) 1954	Vilmorin (GB); 1943	Queen of the Meadows	Queen of the Blues
Sire Quorum (GB) 1954	Akimbo (GB); 1947	Bois Roussel	Vatout
Sire Quorum (GB) 1954	Akimbo (GB); 1947	Bois Roussel	Plucky Liege
Sire Quorum (GB) 1954	Akimbo (GB); 1947	Bulolo	Noble Star
Sire Quorum (GB) 1954	Akimbo (GB); 1947	Bulolo	Pussy Willow
Dam Mared (GB) 1958	Magic Red (GB); 1941	Link Boy	Pharos
Dam Mared (GB) 1958	Magic Red (GB); 1941	Link Boy	Market Girl
Dam Mared (GB) 1958	Magic Red (GB); 1941	Infra Red	Ethnarch
Dam Mared (GB) 1958	Magic Red (GB); 1941	Infra Red	Black Ray
Dam Mared (GB) 1958	Quinta (GB); 1953	Anwar	Umidwar
Dam Mared (GB) 1958	Quinta (GB); 1953	Anwar	Stafaralla
Dam Mared (GB) 1958	Quinta (GB); 1953	Batika	Blenheim
Dam Mared (GB) 1958	Quinta (GB); 1953	Batika	Brise Bise (Family 25)

== See also ==
- List of racehorses
- Repeat winners of horse races
