= L'Escargot (horse) =

Irish racehorse

L’Escargot
- Racing silks of Raymond Guest
- Sire: Escart
- Grandsire: Turmoil
- Dam: What A Daisy
- Damsire: Grand Inquisitor
- Sex: Gelding
- Foaled: 1963
- Died: 1984
- Country: Ireland
- Colour: Chestnut
- Breeder: Mrs B. O'Neill
- Owner: Raymond R. Guest
- Trainer: Dan Moore
- Record: 53: 12-13-7

Major wins
- Meadow Brook Steeplechase (1969); Cheltenham Gold Cup (1970, 1971); Grand National (1975)

Awards
- American Champion Steeplechase Horse (1969)

Honours
- United States Racing Hall of Fame inductee (1977)

L’Escargot (1963–1984) was an Irish national hunt racehorse which won both the Cheltenham Gold Cup and the Grand National.

L'Escargot (French: The Snail) was a large chestnut gelding with a small white star. He was bought for 3,500 guineas as a three-year-old at the Ballsbridge Sales by the United States ambassador to Ireland Raymond R. Guest and went into training with Dan Moore.

L'Escargot made his first appearance at the Cheltenham Festival in 1968 when he was a five-year-old, winning the second division of the Gloucestershire Hurdle with his regular jockey Tommy Carberry. The following year L'Escargot won the Irish Champion Hurdle at Leopardstown and then started second favourite in the Champion Hurdle at Cheltenham and finished sixth behind the favourite Persian War. At the end of the season he went to the United States and ran three times, winning the Meadow Brook Chase at Belmont Park, New York, and being named US Champion Steeplechaser.

In 1970 L'Escargot started as a 33/1 outsider in the Cheltenham Gold Cup. The favourite Kinloch Brae having fallen at the third-last fence, L'Escargot stayed on after the last to beat French Tan by a length and a half. He won the race again in 1971, and came fourth in 1972 and 1973.

In 1972 L'Escargot started as 17/2 favourite in his first Grand National but was brought down at the third fence. The following year he finished third behind Red Rum and Crisp and in 1974 he was beaten into second place by Red Rum. In the 1975 Grand National he started second favourite behind Red Rum. Having nearly unseated Carberry at the fence after Becher's Brook on the first circuit, he went on to win, beating Red Rum by fifteen lengths. He became only the second horse to win both the Cheltenham Gold Cup and the Grand National, the other being Golden Miller.

It was owner Guest's intention that the twelve-year-old L'Escargot would be retired after his Grand National win, and he was given to his trainer's wife, Joan Moore. To Guest's consternation he was raced on one more occasion, coming second in the Kerry National, after which Guest asked for him back and took him to the US, where he died in 1984.

L'Escargot was inducted into the United States Racing Hall of Fame in 1977.

== Grand National record ==
Year	Age	Handicap (st-lb)	Placing
1972	9	12-0	Brought down - fence 3 (open ditch)
1973	10	12-0	Third
1974	11	11-13	Second
1975	12	11-3	First
