= Tommy Stack =

Irish jockey and trainer

Thomas Stack (born 15 November 1945 in Moyvane, County Kerry, Ireland) is a former National Hunt racing jockey and trainer. As a jockey, he is probably best known for piloting Red Rum to a third Grand National victory. Stack was National Hunt champion jockey for the 1974–75 and 1976-77 seasons. He received his first trainer's licence in 1986. In 1994 he trained Las Meninas to win the 1000 Guineas. His other major winners include Tarascon (Irish 1000 Guineas) and Kostroma (Beverly D. Stakes). Stack survived a life-threatening viral infection in December 1998. Following his recovery, he had further international success with Myboycharlie (Prix Morny) and Alexander Tango (Garden City Stakes). He trained at Golden, County Tipperary, and retired as a trainer at the end of the 2016 flat racing season, handing over the licence to his son, James.

== See also ==
- British jump racing Champion Jockey
- 1977 Grand National
