= Tommy Carberry =

Irish jockey and trainer (1941–2017)

Thomas Carberry (15 September 1941 – 12 July 2017) was an Irish jockey who rode mostly in National Hunt races. He was Irish Jump Racing Champion Jockey 4 times. He is best known for winning the 1975 Grand National on L'Escargot. He rode 16 Cheltenham Festival winners, including L'Escargot in the 1970 and 1971 Gold Cup and Ten Up in the 1975 Gold Cup. After retiring from race riding in 1982, he became a trainer and in 1999 saddled Bobbyjo to win the Grand National.

== Career ==
As a teenager, Carberry was apprenticed to trainer Jimmy Lenehan and rode his first winner on Ben Beoch in 1958. He went on to win the champion apprentice jockey title in 1959. He then moved to National Hunt trainer Dan Moore's yard, where he remained stable jockey for the rest of his career. In 1962, he rode his first winner at the Cheltenham Festival on the Moore-trained Tripacer in the Supreme Novices' Hurdle.

Carberry won the 1970 and 1971 Cheltenham Gold Cup on L'Escargot, trained by Moore and owned by Raymond Guest, former American ambassador to Ireland. In 1972 he partnered L'Escargot in the Grand National but did not get further than the third fence, where the horse was brought down. In the 1973 Grand National they came third, the following year they came second, and in 1975 they won the race. Carberry also won the 1975 Irish Grand National on Brown Lad and the 1975 Cheltenham Gold Cup on Ten Up, thus becoming the first jockey to win the Aintree and Irish Grand Nationals and the Cheltenham Gold Cup in a season.

Carberry won a total of sixteen races at the Cheltenham Festival, his final victory coming in 1982 on The Brockshee, in the Arkle Challenge Trophy. He was an Irish champion jump jockey in 1973, 1974, 1975 (joint) and 1976. He also rode on the flat, winning the Irish Champion Stakes (then known as the Joe McGrath Memorial Stakes) on Fordham for trainer Vincent O'Brien in 1979.

After retiring as a jockey following an injury in a fall in 1982, Carberry began training at Ratoath, County Meath. He saddled the winner of the 1999 Grand National Bobbyjo, ridden by his son Paul Carberry. It was the first time an Irish trained horse had won the race since L'Escargot in 1975. Bobbyjo also won the 1998 Irish Grand National.

== Personal life ==
Born near Ratoath, County Meath, Carberry married Pamela Moore, the daughter of trainer Dan Moore, in 1970. Their children are: Thomas, Paul, Philip, Nina, Mark and Peter John. Paul won the 1998 Irish Grand National and the 1999 Aintree Grand National on Bobbyjo, trained by his father. Philip won the Irish Grand National in 2006 and Nina won in 2011. Mark is the only one of Thomas's children that was not a jockey or trainer. Carberry died after suffering a stroke and battling dementia on 12 July 2017, aged 75.
