= Ginger McCain =

English racehorse trainer (1930–2011)

McCain in 1996

Donald "Ginger" McCain (21 September 1930 – 19 September 2011) was an English horse trainer who led the champion steeplechaser Red Rum to three Grand National victories in the 1970s. A former national serviceman in the Royal Air Force as a motorcycle dispatch rider, he was also a member of the RAF scrambling team.

== Horseracing ==
McCain applied for a training permit in 1953 and began training horses in 1962, using small stables behind the showroom of his used-car store in his hometown of Southport. He bought a horse for 6,000 guineas that turned out to be suffering from a debilitating bone disease. The horse was Red Rum.

McCain trained the winner of the Grand National steeplechase four times, three times in the 1970s with Red Rum and a fourth time in 2004 with Amberleigh House. His first and fourth victories were over 30 years apart.

The 1973 Grand National was a duel of nine minutes two seconds between Red Rum and Crisp, with L'Escargot (a previous double Cheltenham Gold Cup winner and future 1975 Grand National winner) well beaten in third place. The winning time broke the course record that had stood for nearly 40 years and remained unbeaten until it was bettered by Mr Frisk in the 1990 Grand National immediately after a number of safety changes sped up the course for that year. In 2009 four Guardian journalists compiled a list of six Grand National moments and selected the 1973 Grand National battle as number one.

George Dockeray and Fred Rimell are the only other people to train four winners of the Grand National.

In his final Grand National in 2006, McCain entered three horses: Inca Trail, who ran well for a long way until running out of stamina two fences from home and finishing eighth; Ebony Light, who fell; and Amberleigh House, who was pulled up.

McCain retired after the 2006 National, handing over control of the stable to his son, Donald Jr., who trained 2011 National winner Ballabriggs.

After watching the 2011 Grand National, where there were two equine fatalities, McCain expressed concern that the lowering of the fences in aid of safety was having the opposite impact through speeding up the race and increasing the risk of equine fatalities. Following further fatalities in the 2012 Grand National, a far cry from the lower equine fatalities of the 1950s and 1960s (apart from four equine fatalities at the 1954 Grand National and where there was an unusually small field of runners), these concerns are being increasingly openly expressed by other National Hunt and Grand National experts, and the wisdom of the approach to improving safety from the 1989 Grand National onwards is coming under close scrutiny.

== Personal life ==
McCain married Beryl Harris in Southport in March 1961; the couple had two children: Joanne and Donald Jr. McCain worked as a taxi driver to supplement his income as a trainer prior to finding Grand National success. It was as a taxi driver that he became acquainted with Noel le Mare, on whose behalf Red Rum was purchased.

On 29 April 2004, McCain was awarded the Honorary Freedom of the Borough of Sefton which is the highest award the council can bestow on an individual. The award was presented to McCain on 22 June 2004.

== Death ==
McCain died from cancer on 19 September 2011, at age 80. On the opening day of the 2012 Grand National a bronze statue of McCain was unveiled at Aintree Racecourse looking down on the winning post where his victories unfolded.
