= 1954 Grand National =

English steeplechase horse race

- Grand National
- Location: Aintree Racecourse
- Date: 27 March 1954
- Winning horse: (Republic of Ireland) Royal Tan
- Starting price: 8/1
- Jockey: (Republic of Ireland) Bryan Marshall
- Trainer: (Republic of Ireland) Vincent O'Brien
- Owner: (Republic of Ireland) Joe H. Griffin
- Conditions: Good

External videos
- Highlights of the 1954 Grand National (British Pathé)

The 1954 Grand National was the 108th annual renewal of the Grand National steeplechase that took place at Aintree Racecourse near Liverpool, England, on 10 April 1954.

The race was won by ten-year-old gelding Royal Tan, an 8/1 shot trained by Vincent O'Brien. O'Brien had also trained the previous year's winner, Early Mist, and would secure a third consecutive win the following year with Quare Times. Royal Tan was ridden by jockey Bryan Marshall, who also won his second consecutive Grand National. Tudor Line was second and the 15/2 favourite Irish Lizard finished third.

Only 29 horses ran in the race, the fewest since 1935 when 27 ran. The 1954 running saw four equine fatalities during the race; this remains the only Grand National renewal to have yielded four fatalities. Dominick's Bar dropped dead jumping the second fence; Paris New York incurred a cervical fracture at the fourth. Legal Joy, who finished second two years previously, broke a leg at the 13th and was euthanised, while Coneyburrow was injured at the 28th and was also put down. The two latter fatalities remain the only ones ever recorded at the 13th and 28th fences in the Grand National.

== Finishing order ==
Position	Name	Jockey	Age	Handicap (st-lb)	SP	Distance
01	Royal Tan	Bryan Marshall	10	11-7	8/1	A Neck
02	Tudor Line	George Slack	9	10-7	10/1	
03	Irish Lizard	Michael Scudamore	11	10-5	15/2	
04	Churchtown	Tos Taaffe	9	10-3	10/1	
05	Sanperion	Derek Leslie	9	10-2	20/1	
06	Martinique	Mr E Greenaway	8	10-1	66/1	
07	Uncle Barney	Leo McMorrow	11	10-1	50/1	
08	Southern Coup	Arthur Thompson	12	10-10	40/1	
09	Ontray	Bobby Brewis	6	10-8	66/1	Last to complete

== Non-finishers ==
Fence	Name	Jockey	Age	Handicap (st-lb)	SP	Fate
01	Alberoni	Mr E Cousins	11	10-12	66/1	Fell
01	Gentle Moya	John Straker	8	10-0	100/6	Fell
01	Swinton Hero	Mr C Harty	10	10-6	66/1	Fell
01	Whispering Steel	Bert Morrow	9	10-12	40/1	Fell
02	Dominick's Bar	Tim Molony	10	10-7	33/1	Fell
02	Minmax	Capt M MacEwan	10	10-0	66/1	Refused
03	Baire	John Foster	8	10-0	66/1	Fell
04	Paris New York	Mick Roberts	7	10-0	66/1	Fell
05	Gay Monarch II	Tim Brookshaw	8	10-4	50/1	Fell
08	Statesman	Eddie Newman	8	10-0	50/1	Fell
12	Border Luck	Tommy Shone	9	10-0	66/1	Fell
13	Legal Joy	David Dick	11	11-3	33/1	Fell
15	Triple Torch	Derek Ancil	8	10-0	66/1	Unseated Rider
15	Hiebra	Rex Hamey	9	10-0	66/1	Fell
19	Icy Calm	Dick Francis	11	10-5	40/1	Pulled Up
23	Ordnance	Jack Dowdeswell	8	10-1	18/1	Fell
23	Prince of Aragon	J Gorey	13	10-2	66/1	Fell
28	Coneyburrow	Pat Taaffe	8	10-11	8/1	Fell
28	Punchestown Star	Sam McComb	10	10-0	66/1	Refused
28	Royal Stuart	Jimmy Power	11	10-0	66/1	Refused
