= Sam Morshead =

Irish jockey and horse racing administrator

Samuel Rodd Morshead MBE (11 June 1955 – 25 September 2018) was an Irish jockey who competed in National Hunt racing and later became a successful horse racing administrator.

Morshead's parents were from Cornwall but he was born and brought up in Ireland. He began his career as a jockey in Ireland and rode his first winner at Fairyhouse Racecourse in April 1973. He moved to Britain at the age of 20 and spent the majority of his career at the stable of Fred Rimell, continuing as jockey for Rimell's widow, Mercy, after the trainer's death in 1981. He retired from riding after a bad fall at Worcester in 1987. His most notable victory as a rider came when Another Dolly was awarded the victory in the 1980 Queen Mother Champion Chase after the disqualification of Chinrullah for failing a dope test. Morshead also gained Cheltenham Festival successes on Gaye Chance in the 1981 Sun Alliance Novices' Hurdle and the 1984 Stayers' Hurdle. He rode over 400 winners in a British career lasting 14 seasons.

After retiring as a jockey, Morshead developed a career in racecourse administration. He was appointed clerk of the course at Perth Racecourse in 1988 and served as racecourse manager there from 1994 to his retirement in 2015. Over his time as manager, the course saw increases in attendance and was honoured as best course in Scotland and the north-east in 2014. He was also clerk of the course at Ayr, Kelso and Musselburgh during his career.

Morshead retired from his position at Perth due to ill-health in 2015 and died from cancer in September 2018. He was appointed a Member of the Order of the British Empire in the 2017 New Year Honours for services to horse racing and charity. Morshead was married three times and had three sons.
