= 2006 Grand National =

English steeplechase horse race

- Grand National
- Location: Aintree
- Date: 8 April 2006
- Winning horse: (Republic of Ireland) Numbersixvalverde
- Starting price: 11/1
- Jockey: (Republic of Ireland) Niall Madden
- Trainer: Martin Brassil
- Owner: Bernard Carroll
- Conditions: Good

External videos
- Replay of the 2006 Grand National in full Racing TV, YouTube

The 2006 Grand National (officially known as the John Smith's Grand National for sponsorship reasons) was the 159th official annual running of the Grand National steeplechase which took place at Aintree near Liverpool, England, on 8 April 2006 and attracted the maximum permitted field of forty competitors for total prize money of £689,360 including £399,140 to the winner.

11–1 Irish shot Numbersixvalverde, ridden by Niall Madden, won the race, ahead of 5–1 joint-favourite and the previous year's winner Hedgehunter in second place. The other joint-favourite, Clan Royal, was deemed third in a photo finish ahead of Nil Desperandum at 33–1. Nine of the forty runners completed the course, the fewest since 2001.

== Runners and betting ==
Clan Royal was the long-time ante-post favourite with the public on the back of finishing second in 2004 and being carried out while leading in 2005, as well as being partnered with champion jockey Tony McCoy. But significant money on race day went on the 2005 winner Hedgehunter who was again to be partnered by Ruby Walsh. The pair went off as joint-favourites while other popular choices among the public were Racing Post Chase winner Innox from France, Garvivonnian, the winner of the Becher Chase over one circuit of the National course five months earlier, 2005 Betfred Gold Cup winner Jack High, 2005 Irish Grand National winner Numbersixvalverde, and the grey Ross Comm, considered to have been underestimated in the handicap by 10 lbs.

No.	Horse	Age	Handicap (st, lb)	Starting price	Jockey	Trainer	Owner	Colours
1	Royal Auclair	9	11–12	33/1	Christian Williams	Paul Nicholls	Clive Smith	Green with yellow spots, yellow and green halved sleeves, purple cap
2	Hedgehunter	10	11–12	5/1 JF	Ruby Walsh	Willie Mullins (Ireland)	Trevor Hemmings	Yellow and green quarters, white sleeves, green cap
3	Cornish Rebel	9	11–9	22/1	Joe Tizzard	Paul Nicholls	Graham Roach	Red with white crossbelts, hoops on sleeves and star on cap
4	Therealbandit	9	11–9	50/1	Richard Johnson	Martin Pipe	David Johnson	Blue with green sleeves and red cap
5	It Takes Time	12	11–8	50/1	Timmy Murphy	Martin Pipe	David Johnson	Blue with green sleeves and white cap with green spots
6	Le Roi Miguel	8	11–7	150/1	Liam Heard	Paul Nicholls	Green/Rose/Cowell	White with black spot, green sleeves with white armband and cap
7	Native Upmanship	13	11–0	100/1	Conor O'Dwyer	Arthur Moore (Ireland)	Sue Magnier	Navy blue
8	Innox	10	10–13	10/1	Robert Thornton	François Doumen (France)	J. P. McManus	Green and orange hoops, green cap with white star
9	Silver Birch	9	10–12	40/1	Sam Thomas	Paul Nicholls	Paul Barber & Des Nichols	Dark green with V, lime green sleeves, dark green and white checked cap
10	Whispered Secret	7	10–12	100/1	Rodi Greene	Martin Pipe	David Manasseh & Dan Levine	Blue with yellow piping and chevrons on sleeves
11	Rince Ri	13	10–12	100/1	Andrew McNamara	Ted Walsh (Ireland)	Frank Moriarty	Claret and white stripes with checked cap
12	Puntal	10	10–12	66/1	Barry Geraghty	Martin Pipe	Terry Neill	White with red spotted sash and armbands, quartered cap
13	Lord of Illusion	9	10–11	33/1	Jason Maguire	Tom George	Patrick Kennedy	Green with white inverted chevrons, white sleeves with green stars, white and pink quartered cap
14	Ebony Light	10	10–10	50/1	Stephen Craine	Donald McCain	Roger Bellamy	White with blue cross of lorraine, striped sleeves and white cap
15	First Gold	13	10–10	100/1	Richard McGrath	François Doumen (France)	J. P. McManus	Green and orange hoops with purple cap
16	Clan Royal	11	10–10	5/1 JF	Tony McCoy	Jonjo O'Neill	J. P. McManus	Green and orange hoops with white cap
17	Le Duc	7	10–10	33/1	Jamie Moore	Paul Nicholls	Green/Rose/Cowell	White with black star, green sleeves with white armband, green cap
18	Sir Oj	9	10–10	33/1	Paul Carberry	Noel Meade (Ireland)	Brian Keenan	Claret and pink checks
19	Forest Gunner	12	10–10	33/1	Ms. Nina Carberry	Richard Ford	John Gilsenan	White with red braces, black sleeves and red cap
20	Joe's Edge	9	10–10	20/1	Davy Russell	Ferdy Murphy	Chemipetro Ltd.	Grey with red cross of lorraine, checked sleeves and red cap
21	Juveigneur	9	10–9	25/1	Mick Fitzgerald	Nicky Henderson	Trevor Hemmings	Green and yellow quarters with white sleeves and cap
22	Amberleigh House	14	10–9	50/1	Graham Lee	Donald McCain	Halewood International Ltd.	Black with red and white striped sleeves and hooped cap
23	Ballycassidy	10	10–9	80/1	Leighton Aspell	Peter Bowen	R. Owen & P. Fullagar	White with red V, red and green striped sleeves, red cap
24	Inca Trail	10	10–9	40/1	Brian Harding	Donald McCain	Halewood International Ltd.	Black with red and white striped sleeves, white cap
25	Garvivonnian	11	10–8	11/1	Garrett Cotter	Ned Mitchell (Ireland)	Angela Long	Red and yellow diablo and checked cap
26	Numbersixvalverde	10	10–8	11/1	Niall Madden	Martin Brassill (Ireland)	Bernard Carroll	Green, black sleeves, white cap
27	Iznogoud	10	10–8	200/1	Tom Scudamore	Martin Pipe	County Stores and Avalon Surfacing	Yellow with burgundy crossbelts, blue sleeves, yellow and blue quartered cap
28	Jack High	11	10–7	9/1	David Casey	Ted Walsh (Ireland)	Brenda Ross	Pink with blue diamond hoop and diamonds on sleeves, white cap
29	Haut De Gamme	11	10–7	25/1	Keith Mercer	Ferdy Murphy	Haut De Gamme Partnership	Black with sky stripe and hoops on sleeves, hooped cap
30	Nil Desperandum	9	10–7	33/1	Tommy Treacy	Frances Crowley (Ireland)	Mike Shone	Red, white sleeves, red and grey quartered cap
31	Baron Windrush	8	10–7	66/1	Carl Llewellyn	Nigel Twiston-Davies	Double Octagon Partnership	Yellow and orange diamonds, yellow sleeves and cap
32	Heros Collonges	11	10–7	66/1	J. P. McNamara	Paul Nicholls	Merchant Rentals plc	Grey, blue V, sleeves, star on cap
33	Tyneandthyneagain	11	10–7	100/1	Peter Buchanan	Howard Johnson	Howard Johnson	Red, blue chevrons, hooped cap
34	Risk Accessor	11	10-06	66/1	Noel Fehily	Jonjo O'Neill	J. P. McManus	Green and orange hoops, purple cap
35	Direct Access	11	10-06	25/1	Tony Dobbin	Nicky Richards	Direct Access Partnership	Orange and blue hoops, orange sleeves with blue armband, orange cap
36	Colonel Rayburn	10	10–6	50/1	John Cullen	Paul Nolan (Ireland)	Thatch (Ferns) Racing syndicate	White and red diablo, white sleeves with black hoops, white and black hooped cap
37	Iris Royal	10	10–6	100/1	Marcus Foley	Nicky Henderson	Sir Robert Ogden	Pink and violet quarters, white sleeves, pink and violet quartered cap
38	Ross Comm	10	10–5	16/1	Dominic Elsworth	Sue Smith	Kevin Treanor	Red, grey V, diablo sleeves and quartered cap
39	Shotgun Willy	12	10–5	33/1	Andrew Tinkler	Richard Guest	Paul Beck	Blue and yellow diablo, purple and orange diablo sleeves, blue and yellow quartered cap
40	Just in Debt	10	10–4	50/1	Alan Dempsey	Martin Todhunter	Bill Hazeldean	Red, blue stars and sleeves with red stars, white cap

== The race ==
There was one false start when Ross Comm tried to bite the tape as it went to rise. The runners were recalled and got away at the second attempt despite the calls from Conor O'Dwyer that his mount Native Upmanship was not ready, being left twenty lengths adrift at the start. Shotgun Willy led over the first fence which claimed Juveigneur, Whispered Secret, Tyneandthyneagain, last year's runner up Royal Auclair and the highly fancied Innox, while the fences leading to the sixth, Becher's Brook, also ended the hopes of Baron Windrush at the third, Ross Comm at the fourth and Ebony Light at the fifth, with Just in Debt failing to negotiate the famous sixth.

Shotgun Willy was headed at the Canal Turn by the tighter jump of Ballycassidy but it was Puntal who moved to the front at the ninth (Valentine's) and led the field back to the racecourse minus Le Duc who had unseated his rider back at the Turn.

Thirty of the original forty starters continued onto the racecourse to The Chair, where Jack High, Silver Birch and Heros Collonges all came to grief. Garvivonnian also blundered there and was pulled up before taking the next, the Water Jump, which marks the end of the first circuit.

Ballycassidy and Puntal had enjoyed a lead of about six lengths on the first circuit but the former began to draw away from the latter and the rest of the field on the run to Becher's for the second time. Behind, Lord of Illusion, Iris Royal, Shotgun Willy, Cornish Rebel, Le Roi Miguel, Direct Access and Amberleigh House all pulled up with Haut De Gamme falling at the 20th fence.

Becher's itself claimed tail-ender Sir Oj and the Foinavon fence saw the tiring First Gold unseat his rider, to leave sixteen runners still in the contest as the field turned at the Canal for the second time.

Ballycassidy still led by four lengths at this point, with only the struggling Rince Ri and Iznogoud too far behind to challenge.

The leader hesitated at Valentine's however and fell to leave Hedgehunter leading the still tightly packed survivors back towards the finish while behind him the 27th fence was far enough for Native Upmanship and Rince Ri who both refused after seeing Therealbandit, Iznogoud and Colonel Rayburn all pulled up. It Takes Time also called it a day after taking the third-last flight to leave nine runners still in the race.

The long run towards the second-last fence paid for Joe's Edge and Forest Gunner, while Hedgehunter, Clan Royal and Numbersixvalverde jumped abreast with their three rivals still tucked in behind. Inca Trail and Risk Accessor were both beaten by the last fence which Numbersixvalverde jumped just ahead of Hedgehunter and Clan Royal, with Nil Desperandum still in touch in fourth.

Numbersixvalverde was now pushed out to take the run-in, and reached the elbow 1 1/2 lengths up on Hedgehunter with equal distances to Nil Desperandum and Clan Royal. From there on the leader increased his advantage over the other three to win by six lengths. Hedgehunter came in second and Clan Royal was given third in a photo finish ahead of Nil Desperandum in fourth.

== Finishing order ==
Position	Name	Starting price	Distance	Prize money
1st	Numbersixvalverde	11/1	Won by 6 lengths	£399,140
2nd	Hedgehunter	5/1 JF	1¼ lengths	£149,730
3rd	Clan Royal	5/1 JF	Short head	£74,970
4th	Nil Desperandum	33/1	A distance	£37,380
5th	Risk Accessor	66/1	16 lengths	£18,760
6th	Puntal	66/1	2½ lengths	£9,380
7th	Joe's Edge	20/1	22 lengths	Nil
8th	Inca Trail	40/1	3½ lengths	Nil
9th	Forest Gunner	33/1	Last to complete	Nil

== Non-finishers ==
Fence	Name	Fate
1st	Royal Auclair	Fell
	Innox	Fell
	Whispered Secret	Unseated
	Juveigneur	Fell
	Tyneandthyneagain	Fell
3rd (open ditch)	Baron Windrush	Unseated
4th	Ross Comm	Fell
5th	Ebony Light	Fell
6th (Becher's Brook)	Just in Debt	Fell
8th (Canal Turn)	Le Duc	Unseated
15th (The Chair)	Silver Birch	Fell
	Jack High	Unseated
	Heros Collonges	Unseated
16th (Water Jump)	Garvivonnian	Pulled up
17th	Lord of Illusion	Pulled up
	Iris Royal	Pulled up
18th	Shotgun Willy	Pulled up
19th (open ditch)	Cornish Rebel	Pulled up
	Le Roi Miguel	Pulled up
	Direct Access	Pulled up
20th	Haut De Gamme	Fell
21st	Amberleigh House	Pulled up
22nd (Becher's Brook)	Sir Oj	Fell
23rd (Foinavon)	First Gold	Unseated
25th (Valentine's)	Ballycassidy	Fell
27th (open ditch)	Therealbandit	Pulled up
	Native Upmanship	Refused
	Rince Ri	Refused
	Iznogoud	Pulled up
	Colonel Rayburn	Pulled up
29th	It Takes Time	Pulled up

== Aftermath ==
Winning jockey Niall 'Slippers' Madden said that he had been given a dream ride all the way but was not actually sure he had won until he crossed the line, despite believing that he would win a long way from home. The second, Ruby Walsh, third, Tony McCoy and fourth, Tom Treacy, riders all agreed that the rain the previous day had gone against their runners, despite all believing that they would win crossing the Melling Road to turn for the second last flight. Fifth-placed Noel Fehily also believed he was going to win on Risk Accessor crossing the Melling Road but confessed that his mount did not get the trip. Barry Geraghty felt that Puntal's chance went when hitting the 20th fence very hard, which winded him slightly before rallying to pick up stragglers late on. The other three riders to complete the course were all delighted to complete the race, while each stated that their mounts were well beaten by two fences out.

Of those that did not complete the course only one rider, Tony Dobbin, pulled up because the horse, Direct Access, was not enjoying it, while Jason Maguire was forced to pull up Lord of Illusion when the horse bled. J. P. McNamara felt he was unlucky to be unseated from Heros Collonges at The chair because his horse was baulked while Andrew McNamara confessed that Rince Ri was stopped by a loose horse falling into the ditch in front of him rather than actually refusing. Leighton Aspell was the only rider to exit the race while lying in the first half dozen when long-time leader Ballycassidy fell but he stopped short of saying that he felt they would win, merely feeling that they deserved to get round after their front running performance.

Tyneandthyneagain continued riderless after falling at the first fence until he fell into the open ditch along the canal side. Upon being returned to the stables he was found to have a serious spinal injury and was euthanised. 2004 winner Amberleigh House was retired after the race.

Stephen Craine was taken to hospital with a broken collarbone after his fall from Ebony Light, while Paul Carberry suffered a sprained ankle after his fall from Sir Oj.

== Media coverage ==
The race was broadcast live on BBC television and radio. The television coverage was as a Grandstand special for the 47th consecutive year. Although BBC television would continue to air the race until 2012 this year's would end up being the final National in Grandstand as the programme would finish in January 2007. The televising of the race included cameras inside the first fence and three inside jockey's caps (Christian Williams on Royal Auclair, Leighton Aspell on Ballycassidy and Sam Thomas on Silver Birch). The programme was presented by Sue Barker and Clare Balding with summary from Richard Pitman, Peter Scudamore and Norman Williamson. John Parrott and Rishi Persad interviewed spectators and celebrity racegoers on course with Angus Loughran reviewing the betting market. The race commentary team was Ian Bartlett, Tony O'Hehir, Darren Owen and lead commentator Jim McGrath who called the runners home for the ninth year.

Prior to the race, nineteen leading racing correspondents were asked to pick their top four. Only one, the BBC website's 'Honest Frank' correctly predicted the winner.

== Jockeys ==
For the sixth consecutive year, Carl Llewellyn was the senior citizen of the weighing room, becoming only the sixth rider to weigh out for his 16th Grand National, including the void race of 1993 in which he took part. Llewellyn retired before the end of the year though he did briefly consider returning for a 17th crack at the race in 2008.

Seven riders made their debut including Niall Madden who became the twenty-first rider to win the race at the first attempt as well as the first in the 21st century. Nina Carberry also completed the course while Stephen Craine, Sam Thomas, Liam Heard, Andrew McNamara and Keith Mercer all failed to reach the finishing post.
