= Alpha Delphini (horse) =

British-bred Thoroughbred racehorse

- Sire: Captain Gerrard
- Grandsire: Oasis Dream
- Dam: Easy To Imagine
- Damsire: Cozzene
- Sex: Gelding
- Foaled: 7 May 2011
- Country: United Kingdom
- Colour: Bay
- Breeder: Mrs B A Matthews
- Owner: The Alpha Delphini Partnership
- Trainer: Bryan Smart
- Record: 30: 8-7-3
- Earnings: £388,166

Major wins
- Beverley Bullet Sprint Stakes (2016); Nunthorpe Stakes (2018)

Alpha Delphini (foaled 7 May 2011) is a British Thoroughbred racehorse. A specialist sprinter, he was unraced as a juvenile and did not win a race until the August of his four-year-old campaign. In 2016 he made steady progress, winning three handicap races before taking the Listed Beverley Bullet Sprint Stakes. He won two minor races in 2017 and in the following year he recorded his biggest success when he won the Group 1 Nunthorpe Stakes. He failed to win in four subsequent races and was retired from racing in 2020.

== Background ==
Alpha Delphini is a bay gelding bred in England by Mrs B A Matthews. In 2012 the yearling was consigned to the Tattersalls October Yearling Sale where he was bought for 20,000 guineas by Oliver St Lawrence Bloodstock. He entered the ownership of The Alpha Delphini Partnership and was sent into training with Bryan Smart at Hambleton, North Yorkshire.

He is the best horse sired by Captain Gerrard, a sprinter who won the Cornwallis Stakes in 2007 and the Palace House Stakes in 2008. Alpha Delphini's dam Easy To Imagine never raced but was a successful broodmare who also produced the Prix de l'Abbaye winner Tangerine Trees. Her grand-dam Emmaline was a half-sister to both Bates Motel and the San Antonio Handicap winner Hatim as well as being closely related to the Kentucky Oaks winner Optimistic Gal.

== Racing career ==
=== 2014 and 2015: early career ===
Alpha Delphini was gelded as a two-year-old in 2013 and did not race that year. He made a belated racecourse debut in October 2014 when he finished unplaced in a maiden race over seven furlongs at Redcar Racecourse. In 2015 he ran second in a maiden at Doncaster Racecourse in May and fifth in a similar event at Hamilton Park Racecourse in June. On 29 August the gelding started at odds of 5/1 for a maiden over five furlongs at Beverley Racecourse and recorded his first success as he won by one and a half lengths from Grand Beauty. On his final run of the year he came home fifth in a handicap race at Pontefract Racecourse in October.

=== 2016: five-year-old season ===
In 2016, Alpha Delphini was ridden in all of his races by Connor Beasley and began his campaign by carrying 130 pounds to victory in a minor handicap at Musselburgh Racecourse on 24 April. In May he finished fifth and third in similar contests at Thirsk and Pontefract respectively. On 8 July Alpha Delphini was assigned a weight of 137 pounds for a handicap at York Racecourse and finished strongly to win by a head from Gamesome. Two weeks later he followed up in a more valuable handicap at Ascot Racecourse, wearing down the long time leader Final Venture to gain the advantage in the last stride and win by a short head. The gelding was then stepped up in class to contest the Listed Beverley Bullet Sprint Stakes on 27 August and started the 13/2-second favourite behind Muthmir (King George Stakes) in a ten-runner field which also included Kingsgate Native, Maarek (Prix de l'Abbaye) and Final Venture. After tracking the leaders Alpha Delphini finished strongly and got up on the line to win in a "blanket finish" by a neck, a short-head and a nose from Willytheconqueror, Muthmir and Final Venture. He was then moved up in class again for the Group 3 World Trophy at Newbury Racecourse on 17 September and sustained a narrow defeat as he went down by a short head to the four-year-old Cotai Glory.

=== 2017: six-year-old season ===
For the first half of the 2017 season Alpha Delphini was matched against top class opposition and struggled to make an impact. He finished eighth to Marsha in the Palace House Stakes at Newmarket, third to Priceless in the Temple Stakes at Haydock Park, sixth to Lady Aurelia in the King's Stand Stakes at Royal Ascot and ninth to Battaash in the Coral Charge at Sandown Park. He was then dropped back in class and started favourite for a minor event at Hamilton, but was beaten three-quarters of a length by the filly Glenrowan Rose. After this race Beasley lost the ride on the gelding and was replaced by Graham Lee, a former National Hunt jockey best known for winning the 2004 Grand National on Amberleigh House. The change of jockey brought about no immediate improvement as Alpha Delphini ran unplaced in the Nunthorpe Stakes and then came home seventh behind Take Cover when attempting to repeat his 2017 success in the Beverley Bullet.

On 25 September Alpha Delphini started 5/4 favourite for a minor race at Beverley and recorded his first win of the season as he took the lead inside the final furlong and held on to prevail by a neck from Line of Reason. In a similar race at Musselburgh in October Alpha Delphini ended his season with another victory as he took the lead approaching the last quarter-mile and won by a length at odds of 6/5.

=== 2018: seven-year-old season ===
Alpha Delphini began his 2018 season by finishing second to Kyllang Rock when favourite for a minor race at Musselburgh on 31 March and then ran a close third behind Mabs Cross and Judicial in the Palace House Stakes. He was narrowly beaten in his next two starts, going down by a short head to Muthmir in the Achilles Stakes at Haydock after leading for most of the way and then failing by a head to run down Mr Lupton in the City Walls Stakes at York in July.

On 24 August Alpha Delphini ran for the second time in the Nunthorpe Stakes and started a 40/1 outsider in a fifteen-runner field. On Lee's recommendation it was decided to run the horse without the cheekpieces he had worn in most of his recent races. Battaash started favourite ahead of Blue Point with the other fancied contenders including Mabs Cross, Mr Lupton, Sioux Nation (Phoenix Stakes), Judicial, Havana Grey (Sapphire Stakes), Washington DC (Phoenix Sprint Stakes), Take Cover and Judicial. After tracking the leaders down the centre of the straight Alpha Delphini moved up to dispute the lead entering the final furlong with his main challenge coming from Mabs Cross who was racing up the stands side rail. The pair crossed the line together, finishing clear of Blue Point and Battaash in third and fourth. The finish was exceptionally close and the judge had to examine the photo-finish for ten minutes before declaring Alpha Delphini the winner by a nose. After the race Lee said "He'd been running really well, game as a pebble, and then when he's headed, he's been rallying like mad. I suggested leaving the cheekpieces off so that he could see them coming, and then you might not have to wait until they get past. The hardest part of riding him is usually going down to the start. It’s like trying to hang on to a bag of cement on a window sill but he was so relaxed today."

On his final run of the year, Alpha Delphini finished unplaced behind Mabs Cross in the Prix de l'Abbaye at Longchamp Racecourse in October.

=== 2019 and 2020: later career ===
On 25 May at Haydock Alpha Delphini began his 2019 campaign promisingly as he finished second to Baattaash in the Temple Stakes with Mabs Cross in third. On 28 July Bryan Smart announced that the gelding had sustained an injury which would rule him out for the rest of the season. He explained "he was very well in himself and he was just a bit silly and that's what happens. He knocked himself and we're going to give him the time."

The 2020 flat racing season in Britain was disrupted by the COVID-19 pandemic and Alpha Delphini did not make his comeback appearance until 18 July, when he finished eighth behind Moss Gill in the City Walls Stakes at York. On 27 August he contested the Beverley Bullet Stakes and came home last of the nine runners behind Dakota Gold. On 24 September Smart announced that Alpha Delphini had been retired from racing but would remain at the stable. He commented "He's been retired but will have a home with me and my family. He's been a wonderful horse throughout his career, always nice to train and he's been very, very good to us and his owners."

== Pedigree ==
Pedigree of Alpha Delphini (GB), bay gelding, 2011
Sire Captain Gerrard (IRE) 2005	Oasis Dream (GB); 2000	Green Desert (USA)	Danzig
Sire Captain Gerrard (IRE) 2005	Oasis Dream (GB); 2000	Green Desert (USA)	Foreign Courier
Sire Captain Gerrard (IRE) 2005	Oasis Dream (GB); 2000	Hope (IRE)	Dancing Brave (USA)
Sire Captain Gerrard (IRE) 2005	Oasis Dream (GB); 2000	Hope (IRE)	Bahamian
Sire Captain Gerrard (IRE) 2005	Delphinus (GB); 1991	Soviet Star (USA)	Nureyev
Sire Captain Gerrard (IRE) 2005	Delphinus (GB); 1991	Soviet Star (USA)	Veruschka (FR)
Sire Captain Gerrard (IRE) 2005	Delphinus (GB); 1991	Scimitarra	Kris
Sire Captain Gerrard (IRE) 2005	Delphinus (GB); 1991	Scimitarra	Fanghorn
Dam Easy To Imagine (USA) 2000	Cozzene; 1980	Caro (IRE)	Fortino (FR)
Dam Easy To Imagine (USA) 2000	Cozzene; 1980	Caro (IRE)	Chambord
Dam Easy To Imagine (USA) 2000	Cozzene; 1980	Ride The Trails	Prince John
Dam Easy To Imagine (USA) 2000	Cozzene; 1980	Ride The Trails	Wildwook
Dam Easy To Imagine (USA) 2000	Zarani Sidi Anna; 1990	Danzig	Northern Dancer (CAN)
Dam Easy To Imagine (USA) 2000	Zarani Sidi Anna; 1990	Danzig	Pas de Nom
Dam Easy To Imagine (USA) 2000	Zarani Sidi Anna; 1990	Emmaline	Affirmed
Dam Easy To Imagine (USA) 2000	Zarani Sidi Anna; 1990	Emmaline	Sunday Purchase (Family: 9-f)
