= 2007 Grand National =

English steeplechase horse race

- Grand National
- Location: Aintree Racecourse
- Date: 14 April 2007
- Winning horse: (Republic of Ireland) Silver Birch
- Starting price: 33/1
- Jockey: (Republic of Ireland) Robbie Power
- Trainer: (Republic of Ireland) Gordon Elliott
- Owner: (Republic of Ireland) Brian Walsh
- Conditions: Good

External videos
- Replay of the 2007 Grand National in full Racing TV, YouTube

The 2007 Grand National (officially known as the John Smith's Grand National for sponsorship reasons) was the 160th official annual running of the world-famous Grand National steeplechase which took place at Aintree Racecourse near Liverpool, England, on 14 April 2007 and attracted the maximum permitted field of forty competitors for a total prize money of £700,000 including £399,140 to the winner.

33–1 shot Silver Birch, ridden by Robbie Power, edged out McKelvey to win the race by three-quarters of a length. Joint-favourite Point Barrow, at odds of 8–1, fell at the first fence. The meeting was attended by around 70,000 spectators at Aintree, and an estimated 16 million adults placed bets on the race.

== Runners and betting ==
2005 Scottish Grand National winner Joe's Edge was the long-time ante-post favourite but public money on race day came for 2006 Irish Grand National winner Point Barrow after being tipped by several morning newspaper tipsters but the big plunge bets went on the heavyweight Monkerhostin who had recently run well in the Cheltenham Gold Cup. Not surprisingly the two former winners in the race, Hedgehunter, under the 11 stone 12 lb top weight and Numbersixvalverde were both heavily supported, along with Longshanks who had twice been placed in the Topham Trophy over one circuit of the course, and the 2006 Summer National winner McKelvey.

Starting price	Number	Name	Age	Weight (st, lb)	Jockey	Trainer	Owner	Colours
8/1 JF	39	Joe's Edge	10	10–2	Graham Lee	Ferdy Murphy	Chemipetro Ltd.	Grey with red cross of lorraine, checked sleeves and red cap
8/1 JF	4	Monkerhostin	10	11–6	Richard Johnson	Philip Hobbs	M. G. St. Quinton	Yellow and pink diamonds, yellow sleeves and cap
8/1 JF	13	Point Barrow	9	10–12	Philip Carberry	Philip Hughes (Ireland)	P. Clune Hughes	Violet with purple trim and quartered cap
9/1	1	Hedgehunter	11	11–12	Ruby Walsh	Willie Mullins (Ireland)	Trevor Hemmings	Green/yellow quarters with white sleeves and green cap
12/1	35	McKelvey	8	10–4	Tom O'Brien	Peter Bowen	N. Elliott	Green with red V, checked cap
14/1	25	Longshanks	10	10–7	Tony Dobbin	Kim Bailey	Alan Halsall	Blue with dark green sleeves and cap
14/1	7	Numbersixvalverde	11	11–3	Niall Madden	Martin Brassill (Ireland)	Bernard Carroll	Green with black sleeves and white cap
16/1	6	Billyvoddan	8	11–4	Leighton Aspell	Henry Daly	Trevor Hemmings	Green and yellow quarters, white sleeves and cap
16/1	2	Eurotrek	11	11–8	Liam Heard	Paul Nicholls	Paul Green	Blue with dark blue diamond on body and cap
16/1	3	L'ami	8	11–8	Tony McCoy	François Doumen (France)	J. P. McManus	Green and orange hoops, white cap
20/1	26	Bothar Na	10	10–7	David Casey	Willie Mullins (Ireland)	Mrs. Michael O'Dwyer	Green with red sash, sleeves and cap
20/1	20	Dun Doire	8	10–8	Paul Carberry	Tony Martin (Ireland)	Dunderry racing syndicate	Green and black hoops, black sleeves, black and white quartered cap
20/1	8	Idle Talk	8	11–2	Jason Maguire	Donald McCain, Jr.	Trevor Hemmings	Yellow and green quarters, white sleeves, red cap
20/1	15	Simon	8	10–11	Andrew Thornton	John Spearing	Mercy Rimell	Claret with sky blue spots on body, reversed cap
22/1	24	Bewley's Berry	9	10–7	Paddy Brennan	Howard Johnson	Andrea & Graham Wylie	Chocolate and brown halves, chocolate sleeves with brown hoops, chocolate cap
33/1	16	Ballycassidy	11	10–9	Denis O'Regan	Peter Bowen	Roddy Owen & Paul Fullagar	White, red V, red and green striped sleeves, red cap
33/1	17	Clan Royal	12	10–9	John P. McNamara	Jonjo O'Neill	J. P. McManus	Green and orange hoops, green cap with white star
33/1	18	Gallant Approach	8	10–9	Jimmy McCarthy	Charlie Egerton	Byrne Bros. (Formwork) Ltd.	Blue with white hollow square and lower sleeves, blue cap
33/1	28	Homer Wells	9	10–6	David Condon	Willie Mullins (Ireland)	Margaret McMahon	Purple, yellow V and cap
33/1	37	Jack High	12	10–3	Richard McGrath	Ted Walsh (Ireland)	Ms. B. Ross, M. McShane, D. Montgomery & W. Moo	Pink with blue diamond hoop and diamonds on sleeves, white cap
33/1	12	Kelami	9	10–12	Mick Fitzgerald	François Doumen (France)	Halewood International Ltd.	Black, red and white striped sleeves and hooped cap
33/1	9	Royal Auclair	10	11–1	Joe Tizzard	Paul Nicholls	Clive Smith	Green with yellow spots and lower sleeves, purple cap
33/1	30	Silver Birch	10	10–6	Robbie Power	Gordon Elliott (Ireland)	Brian Walsh	Black with sky blue star and sleeves with black stars, sky blue cap
33/1	22	Slim Pickings	8	10–8	Barry Geraghty	Tom Taaffe	Doubtful Five syndicate	White with blue checks, sleeves and cap
40/1	29	Liberthine (mare)	8	10–6	Mr. Sam Waley-Cohen	Nicky Henderson	Robert Waley-Cohen	Brown with orange sleeves, quartered cap
50/1	14	Celtic Son	8	10–11	Timmy Murphy	David Pipe	David Johnson	Blue, green sleeves, white cap with green spots
50/1	5	Thisthatandtother	11	11–5	Jamie Moore	Paul Nicholls	Graham Roache	Red with white crossbelts, hoops on sleeves and star on cap
66/1	40	Le Duc	8	10–2	Dominic Elsworth	Paul Nicholls	Stewart Family	Black and white halves, red sleeves and cap
66/1	23	Zabenz	10	10–8	Barry Fenton	Philip Hobbs	Michael Watt	Khaki with green cap
80/1	32	Puntal	10	10–6	Tom Scudamore	David Pipe	Terry Neill	White with red spotted sash, armbands and quartered cap
100/1	10	Cloudy Bays	10	11–0	Andrew McNamara	Charles Byrne (Ireland)	Cloudy Bay syndicate	Black and white stripes with quartered cap
100/1	27	Graphic Approach	10	10–7	Paul Moloney	Charlie Egerton	Mr. & Mrs. Peter Orton	Green with pink and white striped sleeves, pink cap
100/1	21	Kandjar D'allier	9	10–8	Robert Thornton	Alan King	Let's Live Racing	Sky with black centre pin stripe and armbands
100/1	11	Knowhere	9	10–13	Tom Doyle	Nigel Twiston-Davies	Raymond Mould	Green with white stars
100/1	19	Livingstone Bramble	11	10–9	Davy Russell	Willie Mullins (Ireland)	Favourites Racing	Blue with white star, red sleeves with white stars red cap with white star
100/1	31	Philson Run	10	10–6	Daryl Jacob	Nick Williams	Gale Force One	Yellow with orange races, grey lower sleeves and orange spots on cap
125/1	36	Naunton Brook	8	10–4	Noel Fehily	Nigel Twiston-Davies	David Langdon	Green and blue stripes, green sleeves, red cap with blue star
125/1	34	Tikram	9	10–5	Wayne Hutchinson	Alan King	Mike Charlton & Roger Sargent	Green with range sleeves and cap
125/1	33	The Outlier	10	10–6	Paul O'Neill	Venetia Williams	P. J. Murphy	Pink with brown crossbelts and spots on cap
150/1	38	Sonevafushi	9	10–3	Tom Greenall	Venetia Williams	Mr. B. C. Dice	Green and black hoops, green upper, black lower sleeves, green cap

== The race ==
Cloudy Bays broke the tape when the runners were sent off for the first time, resulting in a false start. The long delay in getting the runners set again had many on their toes and they set off at a very fast pace second time. By then Cloudy Bays had little interest in taking part and was left by thirty lengths at the start.

Joint-favourite Point Barrow caused a huge groan from the stands and for millions watching on television by falling at the first fence, ending debutant rider Philip Carberry's National within a minute of it starting. Another debut rider, Wayne Hutchinson was left hanging on to his mount Tikram until finally being unseated as the horse went to jump the second fence.

The Outlier was the first to emerge as the leader and was tracked by Bewley's Berry, Naunton Brook and Ballycassidy as the field successfully negotiated the fences down to the sixth, Becher's Brook.

At the famous brook, Dominic Elsworth found himself falling off his mount Le Duc when he shouted to nearby rival Mick Fitzgerald on board Kelami for help. Fitzgerald pushed Elsworth only for the rider to remain unbalanced and fall off the other side instead. At the same fence Jack High crumpled on landing and fell, while Davy Russell was also thrown from Livingstone Bramble, requiring a trip to hospital for precautionary X-rays on his back.

As the field continued towards the seventh fence (Foinavon) Zabenz was pulled up, a stirrup leather having broken. Monkerhostin's rider Richard Johnson was also having to contend with a broken stirrup leather but his horse was not enjoying the experience and dug his heels in at Foinavon and refused.

Naunton Brook was now in the lead as the field took the 90-degree Canal Turn with Bewley's Berry, Ballycassidy and The Outlier next. Only Tom Doyle was caught out by the sharp turn and was ejected from Knowhere out the side, while right behind them Kandjar D'allier was baulked by two loose horses and crashed into the fence, almost bringing down Homer Wells in the process.

Of the thirty-one remaining only Royal Auclair failed to negotiate the four fences along the canal side that took the field back onto the race course for the first time, falling at the first of those, Valentine's brook, badly hampering Eurotrek.

Naunton Brook and Ballycassidy continued to set the pace as the runners came in front of the stands and made their way towards The Chair. Gallant Approach survived a bad mistake here which put him out of contention, while Cloudy Bays refused when tailed off. Dun Doire was also tailed off at this stage as the field of twenty-nine runners took the water jump and began the second circuit.

The front running Naunton Brook began to show signs of fatigue as Ballcycassidy and Bewley's Berry now took the field over the fences down to Becher's. The Outlier unshipped his rider at the 19th fence (open ditch) as well as Idle Talk, who was already beaten when he dropped a foreleg into the ditch and failed to take off. Billyvoddan was the first of the tailenders to pull up before taking the fence, and the last of the disappointing joint-favourites, Joe's Edge, did the same before the 20th when he was found to have gone lame. Both Homer Wells and Eurotrek had been struggling since they were hampered earlier in the race by fallers. Now with their chances gone they were both pulled up before Becher's Brook along with another tail ender, Celtic Son to leave twenty-two runners still racing.

Bewley's Berry was out in front and cantering when he was caught out by the steep drop at Becher's and fell, leaving Simon and Libertine in front while Graphic Approach was losing touch when he fell, while Naunton Brook was pulled up after jumping the brook.

It's Silver Birch who takes the lead as they race towards the elbow... Slim Pickings is raising another effort and McKelvey is running home like a train down the outside. Silver Birch in front with a hundred yards to go in the National. Slim Pickings and down the outside, McKelvey flying hard. It's Silver Birch in front though! And Silver Birch wins the National, from McKelvey in second, and Slim Pickings is third.

— Commentator Jim McGrath describes the climax of the race

By the second jump of the Canal Turn, Bothar Na, Sonevafushi and Kelami were losing touch. Puntal, Clan Royal, Gallant Approach and Dun Doire were beaten and tailed off.

Ballycassidy was beginning to slow when he turned too sharply and threw his rider, while at the next fence (Valentine's) Simon came down when in second place. Slim Pickings moved into the lead at the next and by the third-last was at the head of a group of ten runners that still carried chances of winning.

The long run to the second-last flight spread the pack out with Slim Pickings taking the fence just ahead of Silver Birch. At the last, Silver Birch landed just in front and began to get away from Slim Pickings on the long run-in. At the elbow, Silver Birch began to labour and Slim Pickings fought back, with McKelvey finishing best. The finishing post came just in time for Silver Birch to win by three-quarters of a length, with McKelvey second by 1 1/4 lengths. Slim Pickings finished third, fifteen lengths in front of fourth placed Philson Run.

Libertine was fifth, Numbersixvalverde sixth, Longshanks seventh, Puntal eighth and Hedgehunter ninth, a distance ahead of L'ami in tenth, Clan Royal in eleventh, and Gallant Approach the last of twelve to complete. Dun Doire pulled up three fences from home, Sonevafushi and Bothar Na bypassed the second-last, and Kelami and Thisthatandtother missed out the final flight.

== Finishing order ==
Position	Name	Starting price	Distance	Prize money
1st	Silver Birch	33/1	Won by 3/4 length	£399,140
2nd	McKelvey	12/1	1 1/4 lengths	£149,730
3rd	Slim Pickings	33/1	15 lengths	£74,970
4th	Philson Run	100/1	5 lengths	£37,380
5th	Libertine	40/1	21 lengths	£18,760
6th	Numbersixvalverde	14/1	1 1/4 lengths	£9,380
7th	Longshanks	14/1	13 lengths	Nil
8th	Puntal	80/1	1 1/2 lengths	Nil
9th	Hedgehunter	9/1	A distance	Nil
10th	L'Ami	14/1	14 lengths	Nil
11th	Clan Royal	33/1	2 lengths	Nil
12th	Gallant Approach	33/1	Last to complete	Nil

== Non-finishers ==
Fence	Name	Fate
1st	Point Barrow	Fell
	Tikram	Unseated
6th (Becher's Brook)	Le Duc	Unseated
	Livingstone Bramble	Unseated
	Jack High	Fell
7th (Foinavon)	Zabenz	Pulled up
	Monkerhostin	Refused
8th (Canal Turn)	Knowhere	Unseated
	Kandjar D'Allier	Baulked, fell
9th (Valentine's)	Royal Auclair	Fell
15th (The Chair)	Cloudy Bays	Refused
19th	Billyvoddan	Pulled up
	The Outlier	Fell
	Idle Talk	Fell
20th	Joe's Edge	Pulled up
22nd (Becher's Brook)	Celtic Son	Pulled up
	Homer Wells	Pulled up
	Eurotrek	Pulled up
	Bewley's Berry	Fell
	Graphic Approach	Fell
23rd (Foinavon)	Naunton Brook	Pulled up
24th (Canal Turn)	Ballycassidy	Unseated
25th (Valentine's)	Simon	Fell
27th (open ditch)	Dun Doire	Pulled up
29th	Bothar Na	Pulled up
	Sonevafushi	Pulled up
30th	Thisthatandtother	Pulled up
	Kelami	Pulled up

== Aftermath ==
The winning rider-trainer-owner combination were among the youngest and least experienced in the history of the race with just one National between them, being a previous ride for 25-year-old jockey Robbie Power. Trainer Gordon Elliott was the youngest in the race and won with his first National entrant while owner Brian Walsh had bought the horse for 20,000 guineas the previous year as the first horse to carry his colours in the race. With a 33/1 winner and only one horse placed at a shorter price it was also a good day for the bookmakers who retained much of the £250 million gambled in the United Kingdom alone on the race, as none of the three joint-favourites completed the course.

Starter Peter Haines came in for criticism for his handling of the start after the runners had charged the tape at the first attempt. Many race commentators felt that Haines was then too picky in trying to get a good line for the restart as he ordered the runners to turn back from the start five times before finally letting them go at the sixth attempt.

McKelvey was also found to have suffered an injury late in the race which would rule him out for almost the entire next season. The injury almost certainly cost him victory.

Winning jockey Robbie Power received a four-day ban from the stewards who found that during the run-in he had used his whip too often and also struck Silver Birch too near the stifle. Third-placed Barry Garaghty was also given a three-day ban for overuse of the whip on Slim Pickings.

Davy Russell required hospital treatment after being thrown from Livingstone Bramble at Becher's Brook on the first circuit for precautionary X-rays on his shoulder and back. 2007 was one of the warmest Nationals on record with temperatures at race time hitting 22 degrees Celsius.

== Media coverage ==
The race was broadcast live on the BBC for the 48th consecutive year, but the first to not be run under the Grandstand banner as the final episodes would air earlier in the year on Saturday 27 January and Sunday Grandstand airing the next day on 28 January 2007. The televising of the race included cameras inside the first fence and two cameras inside jockey's caps (Jamie Moore on Thisthatandtother and Tom Doyle on Knowhere). The programme was presented by Sue Barker and Clare Balding with summary from John Parrott, Richard Pitman and Norman Williamson. The race commentary team was Ian Bartlett, Tony O'Hehir, Darren Owen and lead commentator Jim McGrath who called the runners home for the tenth year.

== Jockeys ==
With the retirement of Carl Llewellyn, Tony McCoy, Mick Fitzgerald and Paul Carberry took over as the most experienced riders in the weighing room, each taking their twelfth ride in the National. Fitzgerald had previously won in 1996 and Carberry in 1999 but McCoy became the eighth rider to have taken twelve rides without being winner or runner-up.

Eight riders made their Grand National debut, with Tom O'Brien finishing second, Daryl Jacob fourth and Sam Waley-Cohen fifth. Wayne Hutchinson and Philip Carberry's debuts both ended at the first fence, while Denis O'Regan, David Condon and Paul O'Neill also failed to complete the course.
