= Thyestes Chase =

Steeplechase horse race in Ireland

Thyestes Handicap Chase
2026
Now Is The Hour	Better Times Ahead	Shecouldbeanything

Previous years
2025
Nick Rockett	Velvet Elvis	Favori De Champdou
2024
Ain't That A Shame	Glengouly	Angels Dawn
2023
Carefully Selected	Dunboyne	Pencilfulloflead
2021
Coko Beach	Run Wild Fred	Class Conti
2020
Total Recall	Class Conti	Minella Fair
2019
Invitation Only	Alpha Des Obeaux	Up For Review
2018
Monbeg Notorious	Wounded Warrior	Space Cadet
2016
My Murphy	Mala Beach	Ucello Conti
2015
Djakadam	My Murphy	Goonyella
2014
On His Own	Los Amigos	Oscars Business
2013
Jadanli	Tarquinius	Panther Claw
2012
On His Own	Tullintain	Jadanli
2011
Siegemaster	The Midnight Club	Ballytrim

2010-2001
2010
Whinstone Boy	Hangover	Siegemaster
2009
Preists Leap	Chelsea Harbour	Arbor Supreme
2008
Preists Leap	Black Apalachi	Newbay Prop
2007
Homer Wells	Livingstonebramble	Well Tutored
2006
Dun Doire	Coljon	A New Story
2005
Numbersixvalverde	Kymandjen	Bizet
2004
Hedgehunter	I'vehadit	Rule Supreme
2003
Be My Belle	Takagi	Kirmar
2002
This Is Serious	Birkdale	Badger's Wood
2001
Bob Treacy	No Problem	Delgany Royal

2000-1991
2000
Micko's Dream	Palette	Bob Treacy
1999
Bob Treacy	The Quads	Emerald Gale
1998
Letterlee	Corymandel	New Co
1997
Couldnt Be Better	Corymandel	New Co
1996
Wylde Hide	Fissure Seal	Love And Porter
1995
Wylde Hide	Ounavarra Creek	Its A Cracker
1994
Nuaffe	Callmecha	Captain Brandy
1993
Zeta's Lad	Ebony Jane	The Committee
1992
Grand Habit	New Mill House	Lanigans Wine
1991
Roc De Prince	Cahervillahow	Mweenish

1990-1988
1990
Mweenish	Lanigans Wine	Auntie Dot
1989
Olan Lad	Bankers Benefit	Cranlome
1988
Feltrim Hill Lad	Sound Judgement	Another Brownie

The Thyestes Chase is a Grade 3 National Hunt handicap steeplechase run in Ireland. It takes place at Gowran Park Racecourse, Gowran, County Kilkenny in January, over a distance of about 3 miles and 1 furlong (5029 metres). There are 17 fences to be jumped. The race is often contested by horses who go on to run in the Grand National and has been won since 2004 by three horses who have gone on to win the Aintree event: Hedgehunter, Numbersixvalverde and Nick Rockett. The most famous winners of the race were Arkle (1964) and Flyingbolt (1966). It currently has a maximum field of 18 runners. The race is sponsored by bloodstock auctioneers Goffs.

== History ==
The race has been won by three-time Cheltenham Gold Cup winner Arkle (1964), Irish Grand National & Queen Mother Champion Chase winner Flyingbolt (1966) and Aintree Grand National winners Hedgehunter (2005), Numbersixvalverde (2006) and Nick Rockett (2025). The race takes its name from the racehorse, Thyestes, named after a figure from Greek mythology. Thyestes, by The Tetrarch (out of Tetratema), was bred by Major Victor McCalmont of Mount Juliet and trained by Atty Persse at Stockbridge, Wiltshire. Thyestes was rated the third-best two-year-old of 1930 as a result of his winning his only two races, the National Breeders Produce Stakes over 5 furlongs at Sandown Park and the Rous Memorial Stakes over 6 furlongs at Goodwood. Thyestes never ran again due to injury and was retired to stud in Yorkshire.

The Thyestes Trophy was presented to the Kilkenny Show by Major Dermot McCalmont for a 5-year-old likely to make a good hunter. The trophy was won by a horse owned by Mr John McEnery of Rossenarra Stud, Kells, County Kilkenny and ridden by his son Martin. The McEnery family then presented it to Gowran Park for the first running of the Thyestes Chase in 1954.

== Records ==
Most successful horse since 1988 (2 wins):

- Wylde Hide – 1995, 1996
- Bob Treacy – 1999, 2001
- Priests Leap- 2008, 2009
- On His Own – 2012, 2014

Leading jockey since 1988 (3 wins):

- David Casey – This Is Serious (2002), Hedgehunter (2004), On His Own (2012)
- Paul Townend – On His Own (2014), Carefully Selected (2023) , Nick Rockett (2025)

Leading trainer since 1988 (10 wins):

- Willie Mullins – Micko's Dream (2000), Hedgehunter (2004), Homer Wells (2007), On His Own (2012, 2014), Djakadam (2015), Invitation Only (2019), Total Recall (2020), Carefully Selected (2023), Nick Rockett (2025)

== Recent winners ==
Year	Winner	Age	Weight	Jockey	Trainer
1988	Feltrim Hill Lad	7	10-03	P Connell	Patrick Griffin
1989	Olan Lad	9	10–13	M Flynn	Frank Lehane
1990	Mweenish	8	10-00	P Gill	John Webber
1991	Roc De Prince	8	10-05	Brendan Sheridan	Ted Walsh
1992	Grand Habit	8	10-03	Jason Titley	Harry De Bromhead
1993	Zeta's Lad	10	10-09	Robbie Supple	John Upson
1994	Nuaffe	9	10–12	S H O'Donovan	Pat Fahy
1995	Wylde Hide	8	10-08	Francis Woods	Arthur Moore
1996	Wylde Hide	9	10-02	Francis Woods	Arthur Moore
1997	Couldn't Be Better	10	12-00	Graham Bradley	Charlie Brooks
1998	Letterlee	8	10-02	Shay Barry	T Cahill
1999	Bob Treacy	10	12-00	Norman Williamson	Michael Hickey
2000	Micko's Dream	8	11-07	Jason Titley	Willie Mullins
2001	Bob Treacy	12	10-08	John Cullen	Michael Hickey
2002	This Is Serious	8	10-00	David Casey	Charlie Swan
2003	Be My Belle	7	10-00	Timmy Murphy	Sean Treacy
2004	Hedgehunter	8	10-02	David Casey	Willie Mullins
2005	Numbersixvalverde	9	10-05	Niall Madden	Martin Brassil
2006	Dun Doire	7	09-10	Paul Carberry	Tony Martin
2007	Homer Wells	9	10-02	Davy Condon	Willie Mullins
2008	Priests Leap	8	10-07	Phillip Enright	Thomas Gerard O'Leary
2009	Priests Leap	9	10–13	Phillip Enright	Thomas Gerard O'Leary
2010	Whinstone Boy	9	09-11	Sean Flanagan	James Joseph Mangan
2011	Siegemaster	10	11-07	Davy Russell	Dessie Hughes
2012	On His Own	8	10-02	David Casey	Willie Mullins
2013	Jadanli	11	10-07	Andrew Lynch	Paul John Gilligan
2014	On His Own	10	11-06	Paul Townend	Willie Mullins
2015	Djakadam	6	11-10	Ruby Walsh	Willie Mullins
2016	My Murphy	10	10-05	Robbie Power	Liam Burke
2017	Champagne West	9	11-07	David Mullins	Henry de Bromhead
2018	Monbeg Notorious	7	10-02	Jack Kennedy	Gordon Elliott
2019	Invitation Only	8	11-06	Ruby Walsh	Willie Mullins
2020	Total Recall	11	11-04	Danny Mullins	Willie Mullins
2021	Coko Beach	6	10-06	Jack Kennedy	Gordon Elliott
2022	Longhouse Poet	8	10-09	Darragh O'Keeffe	Martin Brassil
2023	Carefully Selected	11	11-08	Paul Townend	Willie Mullins
2024	Ain't That A Shame	10	11-03	Rachael Blackmore	Henry de Bromhead
2025	Nick Rockett	8	11-11	Paul Townend	Willie Mullins
2026	Now Is The Hour	9	10-10	Eoin Staples	Gavin Cromwell

== See also ==
- Horse racing in Ireland
- List of Irish National Hunt races
