= Jonathan Burke (disambiguation) =

Jonathan Burke may refer to:

- Jonathan Burke (jockey), see 2025 Grand National
- John Burke (author) (1922–2011), English writer of novels and short stories.
- Jonathan Sayer, British actor and playwright born as Jonathan David Burke.
