= 2004 Grand National =

English steeplechase horse race

- Grand National
- Location: Aintree
- Date: 3 April 2004
- Winning horse: (Republic of Ireland) Amberleigh House
- Starting price: 16/1
- Jockey: (Republic of Ireland) Graham Lee
- Trainer: (England) Ginger McCain
- Owner: Ms. A. L .Dikel, Halewood International
- Conditions: Good

External videos
- Replay of the 2004 Grand National in full Racing TV, YouTube

The 2004 Grand National (officially known as the Martell Grand National for sponsorship reasons) was the 157th official annual running of the world-famous Grand National steeplechase which took place at Aintree near Liverpool, England, on 3 April 2004 and attracted the maximum permitted field of 40 competitors for total prize money of £600,000 including £348,000 to the winner.

39 of the 40 original entrants took part in the race – Tyneandthyneagain was withdrawn. On the run-in after the final fence (where Hedgehunter fell when in close contention), any one of three horses looked capable of clinching victory, but it was 16–1 shot Amberleigh House who finished first, three lengths ahead of Clan Royal, who in turn was two lengths from Lord Atterbury. The winning horse was trained by Ginger McCain, who secured his fourth Grand National win, 31 years after his first with Red Rum. 11 of the 39 starters completed the course, with all of the fallers returning safely to the stables.

For the second year running Bramblehill Duke was a late replacement for the withdrawn Red Striker a day before the race.

== Racecard ==
No	Horse	Age	Handicap (st–lb)	SP	Jockey	Trainer
1	Le Coudray (FR)	10	11-12	28/1	Conor O'Dwyer	Christy Roche
2	Monty's Pass (IRE)	11	11-10	20/1	Barry Geraghty	Jimmy Mangan
3	What's Up Boys (IRE)	10	11-09	25/1	Richard Johnson	Philip Hobbs
4	Alexander Banquet (IRE)	11	11-08	100/1	Shay Barry	Willie Mullins
5	Kingsmark (IRE)	11	11-07	66/1	Mick Fitzgerald	Martin Todhunter
6	Artic Jack (FR)	8	11-07	20/1	Dominic Elsworth	Sue Smith
7	Risk Accessor (IRE)	9	11-04	66/1	Seamus Durack	Christy Roche
8	David's Lad (IRE)	10	11-04	12/1	Timmy Murphy	Tony Martin
9	Bindaree (IRE)	10	11-04	10/1 JF	Carl Llewellyn	Nigel Twiston-Davies
10	Alcapone (IRE)	10	11-00	80/1	Noel Fehily	Mouse Morris
11	Puntal (FR)	8	10-13	150/1	Daniel Howard	Martin Pipe
12	Southern Star (IRE)	9	10-13	25/1	Joe Tizzard	Henrietta Knight
13	Hedgehunter (IRE)	8	10-12	11/1	David Casey	Willie Mullins
14	Shardam (IRE)	7	10-11	18/1	Tom Scudamore	Nigel Twiston-Davies
15	Takagi (IRE)	9	10-11	25/1	Davy Russell	Edward O'Grady
16	Joss Naylor (IRE)	9	10-11	10/1 JF	Paul Carberry	Jonjo O'Neill
17	Amberleigh House (IRE)	12	10-10	16/1	Graham Lee	Ginger McCain
18	The Bunny Boiler (IRE)	10	10-08	33/1	Ross Geraghty	Noel Meade
19	Non-Runner	N/A	N/A	N/A	N/A	N/A
20	Bramblehill Duke (IRE)	12	10-00	200/1	James Davies	Venetia Williams
21	Gunner Welburn	12	10-08	22/1	Tony Dobbin	Andrew Balding
22	Kelami (FR)	6	10-07	66/1	Thierry Doumen	François Doumen
23	Jurancon II (FR)	7	10-07	10/1 JF	Tony McCoy	Martin Pipe
24	Royal Atalza (FR)	7	10-06	100/1	Paul Moloney	Conrad Allen
25	Just In Debt (IRE)	8	10-05	33/1	Jim Culloty	Martin Todhunter
26	Exit To Wave (FR)	8	10-05	50/1	Robbie McNally	Paul Nicholls
27	Clan Royal (FR)	9	10-05	10/1 JF	Liam Cooper	Jonjo O'Neill
28	Akarus (FR)	9	10-04	33/1	Rodi Greene	Martin Pipe
29	Spot Thedifference (IRE)	10	10-04	50/1	Richie McGrath	Enda Bolger
30	Bounce Back (USA)	8	10-04	50/1	Andrew Thornton	Martin Pipe
31	Ardent Scout	12	10-03	50/1	Warren Marston	Sue Smith
32	Bear on Board (IRE)	9	10-01	14/1	Robert Thornton	Alan King
33	Lord Atterbury (IRE)	8	10-01	40/1	Mark Bradbourne	Martin Pipe
34	Mantle's Prince	10	10-01	250/1	Ollie McPhail	Alan Juckes
35	Blowing Wind (FR)	10	10-01	33/1	Jimmy McCarthy	Martin Pipe
36	Skycab (IRE)	10	10-00	200/1	Leighton Aspell	Nick Gifford
37	Wonder Weasel (IRE)	11	10-00	200/1	JP McNamara	Kim Bailey
38	Smarty (IRE)	11	10-00	100/1	Andrew Tinkler	Mark Pitman
39	Montreal (FR)	7	10-00	200/1	Joey Elliott	Martin Pipe
40	Luzcadou (FR)	11	10-00	200/1	Brian Harding	Ferdy Murphy

- Great Britain unless stated.

== Leading contenders ==
The public gambled an estimated £200 million on the outcome of the race but no clear favourite emerged as four horses started off as joint-favourites.

2002 National winner Bindaree was one of the 10–1 joint-favourites after winning the Welsh National at Chepstow in the last December. He had also run well to finish second over one circuit of the Aintree course in the Becher Chase in November where he had been beaten another joint-favourite, Clan Royal. The inexperienced Jurancon II also attracted public attention after being chosen as the ride of champion jockey Tony McCoy having won the Red Square Vodka Gold Cup in February, and Joss Naylor completed the quartet after finishing second in the Hennessy Cognac Gold Cup in November. Hedgehunter was 11–1, the 2001 Irish Grand National winner David's Lad was 12/1, and 2003 National winner Monty's Pass was also among the leading fancies at 20/1.

== The race ==
Alexander Banquet led the field over Melling Road towards the first fence, were Artic Jack was a faller and Kelami was brought down by the fall of Luzcadou. Alcapone led the field onto the next fences before Beecher's Brook. At the third fence which was the first open ditch Shardam blundered and unseated its rider, when chasing the leaders. At the next fence one of the joint favourites Jurancon II fell in mid division. There was no fallers at the fifth fence. At Beecher's Brook the loose horse Shardam caused pandemonium when badly hampering and causing the fall of Akarus, who brought down Montreal, Bindaree and What's Up Boys. Bounce Back also fell, Risk Accessor unseated its rider as did Skycab who was badly hampered. Bramblehill Duke and Blowing Wind both refused the fence. The horses still running managed to negotiate the Foinavon and Canal Turn fence safely. Exit to Wave was pulled up towards the rear of the field before Valentine's Brook. Hedgehunter followed by Puntal and Lord Atterbury led them towards The Chair, where Takagi blundered and unseated its rider. Mantle's Prince tailed off and was pulled up at the Water Jump. Twenty two horses were still left standing as they began the second circuit of the course with one of the joint favourites Joss Naylor at the back the field. At the 18th fence Alexander Banquet fell and Southern Star was pulled up. The 19th fence which was an open ditch claimed Puntal who unseated its rider while just behind the leaders, where Clan Royal blundered and made a mistake. Joss Naylor tailed off and was pulled up. At the next fence Gunner Welburn was pulled up. Onto Beecher's Brook second time where Le Coudray fell, after this fence was Foinavon which saw Just In Debt who unseated its rider after being hampered by a loose horse when behind. Alcapone was pulled up at 25th fence after weakening, Wonder Weasel was pulled up 3 out after tailing off. Two fences from the finish Clan Royal, Lord Atterbury and Hedgehunter gained a lead of a couple of lengths from Amberleigh House in fourth. Clan Royal led over the last ahead of Lord Atterbury and Hedgehunter who fell. As they went up the run-in Clan Royal wandered to the left after his rider Liam Cooper had lost his whip earlier in the race, at the elbow Clan Royal still held the lead from Lord Atterbury and Amberleigh House who had joined the two. Amberleigh House stayed on well to lead the final 100 yards of the race and win by 3 lengths from Clan Royal in 2nd followed by Lord Atterbury in 3rd, nearly 30 lengths ahead of Monty's Pass and Spot Thedifference in 4th and 5th respectively. Behind these were Smarty, Ardent Scout, Bear on Board, Kingsmark, The Bunny Boiler and last to complete David's Lad. Eleven horses completed the race.

== Finishing order ==
Position	Name	Rider	Age	Weight (st, lb)	Starting price	Distance or fate
1st	Amberleigh House	Graham Lee	12	10–10	16/1	Won by 3 lengths
2nd	Clan Royal	Liam Cooper	9	10–5	10/1 JF	2 lengths
3rd	Lord Atterbury	Mark Bradburne	8	10–1	40/1	29 lengths
4th	Monty's Pass	Barry Geraghty	11	11–10	20/1	1 length
5th	Spot Thedifference	Richard McGrath	11	10–4	50/1	3½ lengths
6th	Smarty	Andrew Tinkler	11	10–4	100/1	17 lengths
7th	Ardent Scout	Warren Marston	12	10–3	50/1	8 lengths
8th	Bear on Board	Robert Thornton	9	10–1	14/1	18 lengths
9th	Kingsmark	Mick Fitzgerald	11	11–7	66/1	Neck
10th	The Bunny Boiler	Ross Geraghty	10	10–8	33/1	A distance
11th	David's Lad	Timmy Murphy	10	11–4	12/1	Last to complete

== Non-finishers ==
Fence	Name	Rider	Age	Weight (st, lb)	Starting price	Fate
1st	Luzcadou	Brian Harding	11	10–9	200/1	Fell
1st	Artic Jack	Dominic Elsworth	8	11–7	20/1	Fell
1st	Kelami	Thiery Doumen	6	10–7	66/1	Brought down
3rd (open ditch)	Shardam	Tom Scudamore	7	10–11	18/1	Pecked, unseated rider
4th	Jurancon II	Tony McCoy	7	10–7	10/1 JF	Fell
6th (Becher's Brook)	Risk Accessor	Seamus Durack	9	11–4	66/1	Blundered, unseated rider
6th (Becher's Brook)	Montreal	Joey Elliott	7	10–1	200/1	Brought Down
6th (Becher's Brook)	Akarus	Rodi Greene	9	10–4	33/1	Hampered, Brought Down
6th (Becher's Brook)	Bindaree	Carl Llewellyn	10	11–4	10/1 JF	Hampered, Brought Down
6th (Becher's Brook)	Bramblehill Duke	James Davies	12	10–13	200/1	Refused, unseated rider
6th (Becher's Brook)	Blowing Wind	Jimmy McCarthy	11	10-01	33/1	Refused
6th (Becher's Brook)	Bounce Back	Andrew Thornton	8	10–4	50/1	Fell
6th (Becher's Brook)	What's Up Boys	Richard Johnson	10	11–9	25/1	Brought down
6th (Becher's Brook)	Skycab	Leighton Aspell	12	10–11	200/1	Hampered, unseated rider
9th (Valentine's)	Exit To Wave	Bobby McNally	8	10–5	50/1	Pulled up
15th (The Chair)	Takagi	Davy Russell	9	10–11	25/1	Unseated rider
16th (water jump)	Mantle's Prince	Ollie McPhail	10	10–1	250/1	Pulled up
18th	Southern Star	Joe Tizzard	9	10–13	25/1	Pulled up
18th	Alexander Banquet	James Barry	11	11–8	100/1	Fell
19th (open ditch)	Puntal	Danny Howard	8	10–13	150/1	Unseated Rider
19th (open ditch)	Joss Naylor	Paul Carberry	9	10–11	10/1 JF	Tailed off, pulled up
20th	Gunner Welburn	Tony Dobbin	12	10–8	22/1	Pulled up
22nd (Becher's)	Le Coudray	Conor O'Dwyer	10	11–12	28/1	Fell
23rd (Foinavon)	Just in Debt	Jim Culloty	8	10–5	33/1	Hampered, unseated rider
25th (Valentine's)	Alcapone	Noel Fehily	10	11–0	80/1	Pulled up
28th	Wonder Weasel	John P. McNamara	11	10–6	200/1	Pulled up
29th	Royal Atalza	Paul Moloney	7	10–6	100/1	Tailed off, pulled up
30th	Hedgehunter	David Casey	8	10–12	11/1	Fell

== Media coverage ==
Hedgehunter's a faller at the last! Clan Royal in front by two or three lengths. Trying hard is now Lord Atterbury on the near side... Clan Royal is veering off. He's running all over the place! Now Lord Atterbury and Amberleigh House on the near side! As they're on the run-in for home it's Clan Royal who's just in front. Now Amberleigh House is absolutely flying down the outside! It might be another one for Ginger McCain! It's Amberleigh House. Amberleigh House is gonna give the Red Rum man another win in the National!

— Commentator Jim McGrath describes the climax of the race

The race was covered live on television and radio by the BBC, in accordance with the Ofcom Code on Sports and Other Listed and Designated Events, for the 46th consecutive year. The coverage was also syndicated globally and broadcast on the Internet for the first time to UK subscribers on the BBC website. The television coverage was presented by Claire Balding and Sue Barker. The race commentary team consisted of Ian Bartlett, Tony O'Hehir, Darren Owen and lead commentator Jim McGrath, who called the runners home for the seventh year. After the race Lydia Hislop, Richard Pitman, Peter Scudamore and Norman Williamson talked the viewers through a full re-run of the race.

Both Bartlett and Owen were covering their first Grand National on television after the retirement of John Hanmer; Bartlett had previously been part of the radio commentary team. This was also the first time since 1967 that the race was commentated on by a team of four rather than three.

Racing UK provided its own coverage of the race to bookmakers' outlets across the country. The BBC also broadcast radio commentary of the race on national radio for the 74th year as part of its Radio Five Saturday sports show.

All of the leading daily newspapers in the United Kingdom ran centre spread pullouts of various sizes with colour guides and profiles of all the runners, while office sweepstake kits were printed by three major dailys during the week prior to the race.

== Jockeys ==
Carl Llewellyn was the most experienced rider in the race, being only the twelfth man to weigh out for the fourteenth time for a Grand National.

Six riders made their debut in the race with Andrew Tinkler and Ross Geraghty completing the course. James Barry, Bobby McNally, James Davies and Joey Elliott failed to reach the finishing post.
