= Jonjo O'Neill =

Jonjo O'Neill may refer to:

- Jonjo O'Neill (jockey) (born 1952), Irish racehorse trainer and jockey
- Jonjo O'Neill (actor) (born 1978), actor from Northern Ireland
- Jonjo O'Neill Jr. (born 1998), jockey, see 2025 Grand National
