= Silver Birch (horse) =

Irish-bred Thoroughbred racehorse

- Sire: Clearly Bust
- Grandsire: Busted
- Dam: All Gone
- Damsire: Giolla Mear
- Sex: Gelding
- Foaled: 1997
- Country: Ireland
- Colour: Bay
- Breeder: Joe Power and Mrs Mel Power
- Owner: Brian Walsh
- Trainer: Paul Nicholls; Gordon Elliott
- Record: 29: 7-5-2
- Earnings: £545,780

Major wins
- Becher Chase (2004); Welsh National (2004); Grand National (2007)
- Last updated on 16 April 2007

Silver Birch (born 10 April 1997) is an Irish-trained thoroughbred racehorse. He was owned through the first part of his career by Paul Barber and Des Nichols, then from 2006 by Brian Walsh from County Kildare, Ireland, a farmer and stud owner. Ridden by Robbie Power and trained by 29-year-old Gordon Elliott, Silver Birch was the winner of the 2007 John Smith's Grand National at Aintree Racecourse, run on Saturday 14 April 2007. He was Walsh and Elliott's first runner in the race.

== Racing career ==
Silver Birch had previously won the Becher Chase at Aintree and the Welsh National in 2004 trained by Paul Nicholls, ridden by Ruby Walsh, for owners Des Nichols and Paul Barber who had seen him as a potential Grand National horse from his early hurdling days. He had been an early favourite in the betting coming into the 2005 Grand National under the champion trainer (Paul Nicholls), but a leg injury ruled him out from the race.

He competed in the 2006 race but was hampered and fell at the Chair, the largest fence on the course. His starting price that day, in dramatic contrast to the enthusiasm he'd engendered the previous year, had been 40-1. He was subsequently sold at Doncaster Sales.

In 2007 Silver Birch came second in the cross-country race at the Cheltenham Festival. Gordon Elliott had originally wanted Jason Maguire to ride him but he picked Idle Talk instead. That allowed Robbie Power to take the ride. Silver Birch won the 2007 Grand National by 3/4 of a length from McKelvey.

Silver Birch also participated in 2009 Grand National, once again under Robbie Power, but fell at Becher's Brook on the second circuit. He then competed in cross-country chases for another season before being retired in 2010.
