= Bobbyjo Chase =

Steeplechase horse race in Ireland

Bobbyjo Chase
2026
Grangeclare West	Gerri Colombe	Stellar Story

Previous years
2025
Nick Rockett	Intense Raffles	Capodanno
2024
I Am Maximus	Vanillier	Minella Crooner
2023
Kemboy	Vanillier	Now Where Or When
2022
Any Second Now	Escaria Ten	Burrows Saint
2021
Acapella Bourgeois	Burrows Saint	The Long Mile

2020-2011
2020
Acapella Bourgeois	Bellshill	Alpha Des Obeaux
2019
Rathvinden	Alpha Des Obeaux	Valseur Lido
2018
Bellshill	A Genie In Abottle	Val De Ferbet
2017
Pleasant Company	Thunder And Roses	Baie Des Iles
2016
Boston Bob	On His Own	Turban
2015
Roi Du Mee	Foildubh	My Murphy
2014
On His Own	Mount Benbulben	Buckers Bridge
2013
Roi Du Mee	Prince De Beauchene	Seabass
2012
Prince De Beauchene	Black Apalachi	Roi Du Mee
2011
The Midnight Club	Arbor Supreme	Oscar Time

2010-2003
2010
Vic Venturi	Black Apalachi	One Cool Cookie
2009
Black Apalachi	Snowy Morning	One Cool Cookie
2008
Afistfullofdollars	Hedgehunter	Snowy Morning
2007
Homer Wells	Jack High	Point Barrow
2006
Forget The Past	Garvivonnian	Marcus Du Berlais
2005
Hedgehunter	Pizarro	Garvivonnian
2004
Takagi	Alexander Banquet	Montayral
2003
Rince Ri	Takagi	Northern Sound

The Bobbyjo Chase is a Grade 3 National Hunt steeplechase in Ireland. It is run at Fairyhouse Racecourse in February, over a distance of about 3 miles and 1 furlong (5,029 metres) and during the race there are twenty fences to be jumped.

The race was first run in 2003 and is named after the racehorse, Bobbyjo, who won the 1999 Grand National. The race is seen as a key trial for the Grand National. It was previously contested at Grade 2 level before being downgraded to Grade 3 in 2017.

== Records ==
Most successful horse (2 wins):

- Roi Du Mee – 2013, 2015
- Acapella Bourgeois - 2020, 2021

Most successful jockey (5 wins):

- Paul Townend - The Midnight Club (2011), Rathvinden (2019), Kemboy (2023), Nick Rockett (2025), Grangeclare West (2026)

Most successful trainer (15 wins):

- Willie Mullins – Hedgehunter (2005), Homer Wells (2007), The Midnight Club (2011), Prince De Beauchene (2012), On His Own (2014), Boston Bob (2016), Pleasant Company (2017), Belshill (2018), Rathvinden (2019), Acapella Bourgeois (2020, 2021), Kemboy (2023), I Am Maximus (2024), Nick Rockett (2025), Grangeclare West (2026)

== Winners ==
Year	Winner	Jockey	Trainer
2003	Rince Ri	Paul Carberry	Ted Walsh
2004	Takagi	Davy Russell	Edward O'Grady
2005	Hedgehunter	David Casey	Willie Mullins
2006	Forget The Past	Barry Geraghty	Michael O'Brien
2007	Homer Wells	Davy Condon	Willie Mullins
2008	Afistfullofdollars	Paul Carberry	Noel Meade
2009	Black Apalachi	Roger Loughran	Dessie Hughes
2010	Vic Venturi	Paddy Flood	Dessie Hughes
2011	The Midnight Club	Paul Townend	Willie Mullins
2012	Prince De Beauchene	Ruby Walsh	Willie Mullins
2013	Roi Du Mee	Davy Russell	Gordon Elliott
2014	On His Own	Ruby Walsh	Willie Mullins
2015	Roi Du Mee	Bryan Cooper	Gordon Elliott
2016	Boston Bob	Ruby Walsh	Willie Mullins
2017	Pleasant Company	Ruby Walsh	Willie Mullins
2018	Belshill	David Mullins	Willie Mullins
2019	Rathvinden	Paul Townend	Willie Mullins
2020	Acapella Bourgeois	Danny Mullins	Willie Mullins
2021	Acapella Bourgeois	Danny Mullins	Willie Mullins
2022	Any Second Now	Mark Walsh	Ted Walsh
2023	Kemboy	Paul Townend	Willie Mullins
2024	I Am Maximus	Jody McGarvey	Willie Mullins
2025	Nick Rockett	Paul Townend	Willie Mullins
2026	Grangeclare West	Paul Townend	Willie Mullins

== See also ==
- Horse racing in Ireland
- List of Irish National Hunt races
