= 2003 Grand National =

English steeplechase horse race

- Grand National
- Location: Aintree Racecourse
- Date: 5 April 2003
- Winning horse: (Republic of Ireland) Monty's Pass
- Starting price: 16/1
- Jockey: (Republic of Ireland) Barry Geraghty
- Trainer: (Republic of Ireland) Jimmy Mangan
- Owner: Dee Racing Syndicate
- Conditions: Good

External videos
- Replay of the 2003 Grand National in full Racing TV, YouTube

The 2003 Grand National (officially known as the Martell Grand National for sponsorship reasons) was the 156th official renewal of the world-famous Grand National steeplechase that took place at Aintree at 3:45pm BST, on 5 April 2003.

The ten-year-old 16/1 shot Monty's Pass, ridden by Barry Geraghty and trained by Jimmy Mangan in Cork, Ireland, won the race by 12 lengths from the 2001 Welsh National winner Supreme Glory (40/1) in a time of 9 minutes 21.7 seconds.

The field was limited to a maximum of 40 competitors, and 14 completed the 4 mile 4 furlong course. Bramblehill Duke was a late replacement for the withdrawn Kingsmark a day before the race.

== Racecard ==
No	Colours	Horse	Age	Handicap (st-lb)	SP	Jockey	Trainer
1		Behrajan (IRE)	8	11-12	22/1	Richard Johnson	Henry Daly
2		Bramblehill Duke (IRE)	11	10-00	200/1	Brian Crowley	Venetia Williams
3		Gingembre (FR)	9	11-09	14/1	Andrew Thornton	Lavinia Taylor
4		Shotgun Willy (IRE)	9	11-09	7/1 F	Ruby Walsh	Paul Nicholls
5		Fadalko (FR)	10	11-07	100/1	Seamus Durack	Paul Nicholls
6		Chives (IRE)	8	11-05	10/1	Richard Guest	Henrietta Knight
7		Iris Bleu (FR)	7	11-03	8/1	Tony McCoy	Martin Pipe
8		Ad Hoc (IRE)	9	11-01	9/1	Paul Carberry	Paul Nicholls
9		Ballinclay King (IRE)	9	10-12	50/1	Davy Russell	Ferdy Murphy
10		Carbury Cross (IRE)	9	10-12	25/1	Liam Cooper	Jonjo O'Neill
11		Bindaree (IRE)	9	10-11	25/1	Carl Llewellyn	Nigel Twiston-Davies
12		Youlneverwalkalone (IRE)	9	10-11	8/1	Conor O'Dwyer	Christy Roche
13		The Bunny Boiler (IRE)	9	10-10	50/1	John Cullen	Noel Meade
14		Blowing Wind (FR)	10	10-09	20/1	Tom Scudamore	Martin Pipe
15		You're Agoodun	11	10-09	50/1	Robert Thornton	Martin Pipe
16		Katarino (FR)	8	10-08	50/1	Mick Fitzgerald	Nicky Henderson
17		Red Striker	9	10-08	50/1	Larry McGrath	Richard Guest
18		Southern Star (IRE)	8	10-08	66/1	Dominic Elsworth	Henrietta Knight
19		Monty's Pass (IRE)	10	10-07	16/1	Barry Geraghty	Jimmy Mangan
20		Majed (FR)	7	10-05	200/1	Rodi Greene	Martin Pipe
21		Amberleigh House	11	10-04	33/1	Graham Lee	Ginger McCain
22		Maximize (IRE)	9	10-04	16/1	Jim Culloty	Henrietta Knight
23		Montifault (FR)	8	10-04	33/1	Joe Tizzard	Paul Nicholls
24		Polar Champ	10	10-04	200/1	Daniel Howard	Martin Pipe
25		Cregg House (IRE)	8	10-03	50/1	David Casey	Paddy Mullins
26		Good Shuil (IRE)	8	10-03	200/1	Noel Fehily	Charlie Mann
27		Mantles Prince	9	10-03	200/1	Ollie McPhail	Alan Juckes
28		Torduff Express (IRE)	12	10-03	33/1	Timmy Murphy	Paul Nicholls
29		Goguenard (FR)	9	10-02	28/1	Warren Marston	Sue Smith
30		Gunner Welburn	11	10-02	16/1	Barry Fenton	Andrew Balding
31		Royal Predica (FR)	9	10-02	33/1	Jamie Moore	Martin Pipe
32		Supreme Glory (IRE)	10	10-02	40/1	Leighton Aspell	Pat Murphy
33		Tremallt (IRE)	12	10-02	200/1	Jason Maguire	Tom George
34		Wonder Weasel (IRE)	10	10-02	50/1	JP McNamara	Kim Bailey
35		Djeddah (IRE)	12	10-01	66/1	Thierry Doumen	Francois Doumen
36		Burlu (FR)	9	10-00	200/1	Gerry Supple	Martin Pipe
37		Red Ark	10	10-00	100/1	Kenny Johnson	Richard Guest
38		Robbo	9	10-00	100/1	Alan Dempsey	Mary Reveley
39		Killusty (IRE)	9	10-00	12/1	Tony Dobbin	Charles Egerton
40		Empereur River (FR)	11	10-00	250/1	Patrick Pailhes	Jacques Ortet

- Great Britain unless stated.

== Leading contenders ==
Shotgun Willy became the favourite for the race after winning the Red Square Vodka Gold Cup at Haydock on 1 March and remained the most popular entrant with the public, going off as the 7/1 clear favourite, ridden by Ruby Walsh who had previously won the race in 2000. Shotgun Willy was always towards the rear of the field and began to lose touch with the leaders early on the second circuit, pulling up after making a mistake at the 21st fence.

Youllneverwalkalone won the Leopardstown Chase in January and then the William Hill Handicap Chase at Cheltenham in March and was sent off as the 8/1 joint-second favourite in partnership with rider Conor O'Dwyer. The horse was naturally popular with punters on the Liverpool course due to links with Liverpool Football Club whose anthem is the song of the same name, however the horse was at the back of the field when he suffered a leg injury at the 11th fence and was instantly pulled up. He was found to have broken a leg and, although he recovered, was never raced again.

Iris Bleu had fallen in the 2002 National but had won the Thomas Pink Handicap Chase at Cheltenham in December and the Agfa Diamond Chase at Sandown in January to be backed to 8/1 on race day. Ridden by champion jockey Tony McCoy, Iris Bleu made a series of mistakes and was pulled up lame before taking the water jump at the end of the first circuit.

Ad Hoc had been travelling well when brought down in the 2002 race, and was partnered by 1999 winning jockey Paul Carberry; the pair went off at a price of 9/1 and almost fell at the first fence. Having recovered, they were making progress when Carberry was unseated at the 19th.

Chives had run prominently in several major races, including finishing second in the 2002 Welsh National and seventh in the Cheltenham Gold Cup and was sent off at 10/1 in company with 1998 winning rider Richard Guest but also disappointed with mistakes before suffering injury at the 11th fence where he was pulled up.

At 16/1, Monty's Pass was considered among the good each-way chances for the race and had been backed heavily on race day from 40/1 the day before after being tipped by several leading tipsters. Among those who predicted his victory were John Francome in The Sun, Eddie Fremantle in The Observer, Marten Julian in The Sunday Telegraph and Thunderer in The Times while Pricewise in the Racing Post tipped the horse to win two months before the race.

== The Race ==
Placed horses

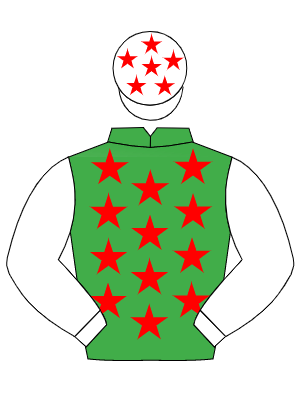
1: Monty's Pass

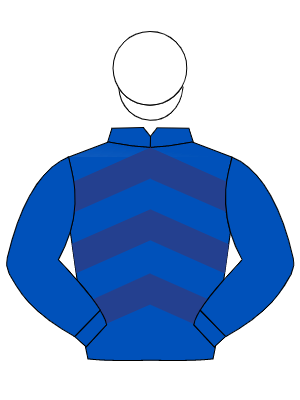
2: Supreme Glory

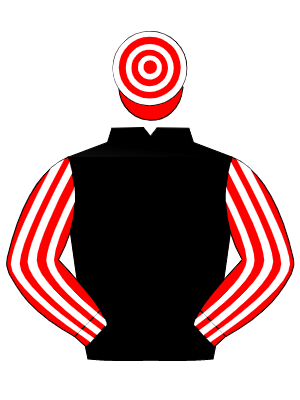
3: Amberleigh House

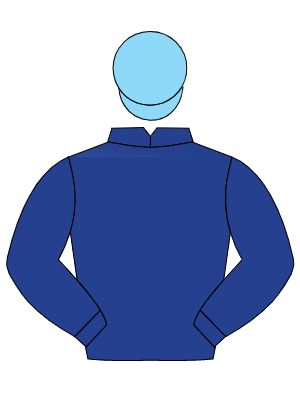
4: Gunner Welburn

Big outsider Tremallt led the field over Melling Road and towards the first fence, where The Bunny Boiler unseated its rider and was the only casualty. The next fence saw Bramblehill Duke fall when chasing the leaders. At the third fence which was the first open ditch, Wonder Weasel was the only faller in mid division. Tremallt continued to lead the race over the fences before Becher's Brook. At Becher's Brook, Fadalko overjumped the fence and unseated its rider. Meanwhile, last year's winner Bindaree blundered and was on his nose after jumping the fence. The field all managed to jump the Foinavon fence well and ran on towards the Canal Turn. At this fence, Polar Champ blundered and unseated its rider when behind. Montifault joined Tremallt at the front of the race while jumping Valentine's Brook. 10/1 shot Chives blundered at the eleventh fence which was another open ditch and was pulled up before the next after breaking a blood vessel. At the next fence, another fancied horse Youllneverwalkalone jumped it slow and was immediately pulled up lame. Leading up to The Chair, Gunner Welburn had become the race leader. However the horse hesitated before jumping the fence and nearly unseated its rider. Katarino unseated its rider Mick Fitzgerald after making a mistake at The Chair and Ballinclay King was pulled up at the rear of the field. The next fence which was the Water Jump saw Iris Bleu pulled up. Thirty horses were still left standing when they continued the race onto the second circuit. All horses jumped the next two fences safely, at the 19th fence (open ditch) Monty's Pass and Torduff Express joined Gunner Welburn in the lead. Maximize fell, Ad Hoc and Goguenard both blundered and unseated their riders. You're Agoodun and Robbo were both hampered and unseated their riders also. Good Shuil was pulled up after tailing off at the same fence. At Beecher's Brook second time round Killusty fell in mid division and Burlu when behind for most of the race, while at the rear of the field the favourite Shotgun Willy pulled up as was Empereur River. Gingembre was pulled up well behind at the Canal Turn. At the next fence which was Valentine's Brook, Mantle's Prince made a mistake and unseated its rider and Red Ark was pulled up at the fence towards the rear of the field. At the 27th fence final open ditch of the race Torduff Express had weakened, blundered and unseated its rider as did Red Striker. Cregg House refused the fence after tailing off. A group of Gunner Welburn, Monty's Pass, Amberleigh House and Montifault pulled away from Supreme Glory and the rest of the field as they crossed Melling Road to jump the final two fences. Monty's Pass jumped the last two fences ahead of Amberleigh House and a weakening Gunner Welburn. On the run-in Supreme Glory seemed to be staying on well after overtaking Amberleigh House just before the elbow. Although Monty's Pass stayed on well to go clear and win the race by 12 lengths ahead of Supreme Glory in 2nd and Amberleigh House in 3rd. Gunner Welburn and Montifault finished 4th and 5th after making a lot of the running in the race. Bindaree stayed on well to finish 6th after spending most of the race towards the rear. Next to finish was Carberry Cross, Blowing Wind, Tremallt, Behrajan, Djeddah, Majed, Royal Predica and last to complete was Southern Star. 14 horses completed the race.

== Finishing order ==
Position	Number	Name	Rider	Age	Weight (st, lb)	Starting price	Distance
1st	19	Monty's Pass	Barry Geraghty	10	10-7	16/1	Won by 12 lengths
2nd	32	Supreme Glory	Leighton Aspell	10	10-2	40/1	2 lengths
3rd	21	Amberleigh House	Graham Lee	11	10-4	33/1	14 lengths
4th	30	Gunner Welburn	Barry Fenton	11	10-2	16/1	11 lengths
5th	23	Montifault	Joe Tizzard	8	10-4	33/1	1 length
6th	11	Bindaree	Carl Llewellyn	9	10-11	25/1	18 lengths
7th	10	Carberry Cross	Liam Cooper	9	10-12	25/1	6 lengths
8th	14	Blowing Wind	Tom Scudamore	10	10-9	20/1	7 lengths
9th	33	Tremallt	Jason Maguire	12	10-2	200/1	7 lengths
10th	1	Behrajan	Richard Johnson	8	11-12	22/1	9 lengths
11th	35	Djeddah	Thiery Doumen	12	10-1	66/1	8 lengths
12th	20	Majed	Rodi Greene	7	10-5	200/1	A distance
13th	31	Royal Predica	Jamie Moore	9	10-2	33/1	26 lengths
14th	18	Southern Star	Dominic Elsworth	8	10-8	66/1	Last to complete

== Non-finishers ==
Fence	Number	Name	Rider	Age	Weight (st, lb)	Starting price	Fate
27th	25	Cregg House	David Casey	8	10-3	50/1	Tailed off, refused
27th	17	Red Striker	Larry McGrath	9	10-8	50/1	Unseated rider
27th	28	Torduff Express	Timmy Murphy	12	10-3	33/1	Unseated rider
25th (Valentine's)	27	Mantle's Prince	Ollie McPhail	9	10-3	200/1	Unseated rider
25th (Valentine's)	37	Red Ark	Kenny Johnson	10	10-0	100/1	Pulled up
24th (Canal Turn)	3	Gingembre	Andrew Thornton	9	11-9	14/1	Tailed off, pulled up
22nd (Becher's Brook)	40	Empereur River	Mr. Patrick Paihes	10	10-2	250/1	Tailed off, pulled up
22nd (Becher's Brook)	4	Shotgun Willy	Ruby Walsh	9	11-9	7/1 F	Tailed off, pulled up
22nd (Becher's Brook)	36	Burlu	Gerry Supple	9	10-0	200/1	Fell
22nd (Becher's Brook)	39	Killusty	Tony Dobbin	9	10-4	12/1	Fell
20th	26	Good Shuil	Noel Fehily	8	10-3	200/1	Tailed off, pulled up
19th (open ditch)	29	Goguenard	Warren Marston	9	10-2	28/1	Fell
19th (open ditch)	38	Robbo	Alan Dempsey	9	10-1	100/1	Hampered by fallen horses, unseated rider
19th (open ditch)	8	Ad Hoc	Paul Carberry	9	11-1	9/1	Unseated rider
19th (open ditch)	22	Maximize	Jim Culloty	9	10-4	16/1	Fell
19th (open ditch)	15	You're Agoodun	Robert Thornton	11	10-9	50/1	Hampered, unseated rider
16th (water jump)	7	Iris Bleu	Tony McCoy	7	11-3	8/1	Pulled up
15th (The Chair)	16	Katarino	Mick Fitzgerald	8	10-8	50/1	Unseated rider
15th (The Chair)	9	Ballinclay King	Davy Russell	9	10-12	50/1	Pulled up
12th	12	Youllneverwalkalone	Conor O'Dwyer	9	10-11	8/1	Pulled up immediately after fence
12th	6	Chives	Richard Guest	8	11-5	10/1	Pulled up
8th (Canal Turn)	24	Polar Champ	Daniel Howard	10	10-4	200/1	Unseated rider
6th (Becher's Brook)	5	Fadalko	Seamus Durack	10	11-7	100/1	Unseated rider
3rd (open ditch)	34	Wonder Weasel	John McNamara	10	10-5	50/1	Fell
2nd	2	Bramblehill Duke	Brian Crowley	11	10-2	200/1	Fell
1st	13	The Bunny Boiler	John Cullen	9	10-10	50/1	Unseated rider

== Aftermath ==
Winner Monty's Pass claimed a prize of £348,000, with £132,000 awarded to Supreme Glory in second, £66,000 for Amberleigh House in third, £30,000 for Gunner Welburn in fourth, £15,000 for Montifault in fifth, and £9,000 for sixth-placed Bindaree.

Some bookmakers offered stakes refunds to customers who backed the first fence faller The Bunny Boiler. William Hill reported that they had to pay out £400,000 on two winning bets alone, claiming it was their worst hit in Grand National history.

In post-race interviews, winning trainer Jimmy Mangan said: "It's a thing you dream about. To have a winner is unreal." Jockey Barry Geraghty said of his ride: "He was like a cat. He jumped unbelievable."

Both the vets and the doctors were busy after the race. Goguenard was euthanised when he was caught in a melee at the 19th fence. Youllneverwalkalone was taken to the Liverpool horse hospital when it was found he had broken a leg in running. The injury was repaired and the horse retired from racing. Iris Bleu pulled up lame, while Ballinclay King and Chives both broke blood vessels. All three horses made a full recovery. Four riders also required hospital treatment after the race. Gerry Supple suffered a broken leg, Alan Dempsey a broken wrist, Brian Crowley a broken collarbone and Timmy Murphy suffered concussion and a broken nose.

== Media coverage ==
The BBC retained the rights to broadcast the race on television and radio for the 44th consecutive year, in accordance with the Ofcom Code on Sports and Other Listed and Designated Events. The race was broadcast as a Grand National special edition of the regular Saturday television show Grandstand, and involved three hours of build-up to the race through features on the principal contestants and the history of the race. The race itself was broadcast live and was followed by a detailed re-run using slow motion footage and additional camera angles not used in the original broadcast.

The show was presented by Clare Balding and Sue Barker while the commentary team was John Hanmer, Tony O'Hehir and Jim McGrath who called the winner home for the sixth year. It was the last time that Hanmer commentated on a Grand National, having covered the portion from the Melling Road to the fourth and from the tenth to the Anchor Bridge crossing for thirty-two years.

In total 52 cameras were used to cover the event including three cameras placed inside jockeys' caps and four inside selected fences. Former Grand National riders Richard Pitman and Peter Scudamore also talked the viewers through an in-depth re-run of the race in slow motion.

In a new innovation the BBC introduced interactive services, which enabled UK viewers to access features such as a statistical predictor, archive footage of previous Nationals and a split-screen view of the race itself to enable viewers to watch the race from the air as well as the normal tracking cameras.

Racing UK broadcast the race live into bookmakers' outlets throughout the country, though its camera angles were limited in comparison to the close-up coverage provided to BBC viewers.

BBC Radio also broadcast commentary of the race live for the 71st time on its Sport on Five programme, presented by Mark Pougatch and with Lee McKenzie calling the runners home. Also among the commentary team was Ian Bartlett, who was to replace John Hanmer in the television commentary team the next year.

== Jockeys ==
Two-time winner Carl Llewellyn was the most experienced rider in the race, weighing out for a Grand National for the thirteenth time, while eleven riders made their debut. Leighton Aspell fared best of those, finishing second, with Graham Lee finishing third while Liam Cooper, Jamie Moore and Dominic Elsworth also completed the course. John Cullen's debut ended at the first fence while Daniel Howard, Davy Russell, Alan Dempsey, Patrick Paihes and Larry McGrath also failed to get round.
