= Nick Rockett =

Irish race horse

- Racing silks of Stewart and Sadie Andrew
- Sire: Walk In The Park
- Grandsire: Montjeu
- Dam: Eireann Rose
- Damsire: Flemensfirth
- Sex: Gelding
- Foaled: 18 May 2017
- Country: Ireland
- Colour: Bay
- Breeder: K D Cotter
- Owner: Stewart & Sadie Andrew
- Trainer: Willie Mullins
- Jockey: Patrick Mullins; Paul Townend
- Record: 13: 7-1-1
- Earnings: £641,133

Major wins
- Thyestes Chase (2025); Bobbyjo Chase (2025); Grand National (2025)

Nick Rockett (foaled 18 May 2017) is an Irish race horse who won the 2025 Grand National steeplechase, ridden by Patrick Mullins and trained by Willie Mullins. He is registered as being owned by Stewart and Sadie Andrew, although Sadie died from cancer in 2022. He also won the 2025 Thyestes Chase and the 2025 Bobbyjo Chase.

== Background ==
Nick Rockett was bred by K D Cotter in Ireland, who purchased his dam, Eireann Rose, at the Goffs Land Rover sale for €10,000 as a three year old. Nick Rockett initially raced for Pat Doyle, winning a point-to-point on his first attempt. Sadie Andrew, one half of the ownership group, knew Willie Mullins from her schooldays and was keen to have a horse in training with him. Mullins purchased Nick Rockett from Doyle on behalf of Sadie and her husband Stewart.

== Racing career ==
=== 2022/23 National Hunt season ===
Nick Rockett finished fourth in a bumper at Fairyhouse under Patrick Mullins in his first outing for his new owners. This was just five days before owner Sadie Andrews died. Returning to the track in February, Nick Rockett went on a three-race winning streak culminating in his first major victory at Fairyhouse in a Grade 2 novice hurdle.

=== 2023/24 National Hunt season ===
Nick Rockett returned to racing over chase fences, his first victory coming in January at Fairyhouse. He would finish just a length behind American Mike in the Grade 2 Ten Up Novice Chase at Navan the following month. Favourite for the Irish Grand National, he would finish seventh and then third in the Bet365 Gold Cup at Sandown Park before the end of the season.

=== 2024/25 National Hunt season ===
Nick Rockett took successive victories in the 2025 Thyestes Chase and the 2025 Bobbyjo Chase. In April, he won the 2025 Grand National at Aintree at a price of 33/1 ridden by Patrick Mullins for his father.
