= Graham Lee (jockey) =

Irish jockey (born 1975)

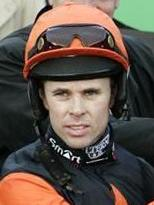
- Graham Lee after winning a novice chase on Aces Four in 2006

Personal information
- Born: 16 December 1975 (age 50) Galway, Ireland
- Occupation: Jockey

Horse racing career
- Sport: Horse racing

Significant horses
- Amberleigh House; Trip To Paris

Graham Lee (born 16 December 1975 in Galway) is an Irish jockey who is based in England. He is one of the few jockeys to have won at the highest level both over jumps and on the flat, winning 2004 Grand National on Amberleigh House and, having switched codes in 2012, the Ascot Gold Cup on Trip To Paris in 2015. He was left paralysed from the shoulders down by a fall at Newcastle Racecourse in 2023.

== National Hunt career ==
Lee rode on the pony racing circuit and left school aged fifteen to work at the yard of trainer Noel Meade. When he was eighteen, he moved to England to join trainer Mary Reveley in Yorkshire. Lee rode his first winners in the 1993/94 season, and achieved his first half-century of winners in the 2001/02 season, when riding for Malcolm Jefferson. Having been taken on as a stable jockey by County Durham trainer Howard Johnson, Lee achieved his first success in a Grade race in March 2003 when Covent Garden won the Grade 2 Premier Kelso Hurdle. Lee was retained by owner Graham Wylie, who had his horses in training with Johnson. Horses owned by Wylie included Inglis Drever, No Refuge and Arcalis, who all provided Lee with Grade 1 wins.

In 2003, Lee rode in his first Grand National. He came third on Amberleigh House, trained by Ginger McCain, who had previously trained the three-time winner Red Rum. The following year, Amberleigh House won the race under Lee. The success could not be repeated, however, as Amberleigh House achieved only tenth place in the 2005 race, and was retired after being pulled up at the 21st fence in the 2006 race. Having won the 2004 Grand National, Lee went on to achieve a rare "Grand National Double" when winning the Scottish National on the Johnson-trained Grey Abbey two weeks later.

Lee was the leading jockey with three wins at the 2005 Cheltenham Festival, having never previously won at the festival. The Grade 1 wins came on Arcalis in the Supreme Novices' Hurdle, No Refuge in the Baring Bingham Novices' Hurdle and Inglis Drever in the Stayers' Hurdle. The three winners were owned by Wylie and trained by Johnson, who received the top trainer's award at the festival. Lee said: "I can't believe it. I am over the moon. At a meeting like this it is great to get one winner, never mind three. It is fantastic - but don't forget Howard, Mr Wylie, all the staff and the horses." Lee finished the season on 100 winners. In spite of another successful season the following year with 108 winners, Lee lost his position with Johnson in May 2006, being replaced with Paddy Brennan. He was immediately offered the position of stable jockey by North Yorkshire trainer Ferdy Murphy.

Lee remained with Murphy until he switched codes in 2012. Although not quite as successful as when riding for Johnson, he secured two further Grade I wins, in the 2007 Swordlestown Cup Novice Chase at Punchestown on Another Promise and the 2009 Maghull Novices' Chase at Aintree on Kalahari King. There were two further victories at the Cheltenham Festival, in the Centenary Novices' Handicap Chase on L'Antartique in 2007 and Divers in 2011. He rode his 1000th winner on 7 January 2012.

Lee suffered a number of injuries during his career as a jump jockey and also had trouble keeping weight on. He worked for a time with former Middlesbrough FC fitness coach Chris Barnes in the gym to improve his fitness and injury recovery times. In March 2012 he decided to switch to racing on the flat.

== Flat career ==
In 2012, his first season riding on the flat, Lee had success in the Group 3 Chipchase Stakes on Maarek for trainer David Nagle, and the Stewards' Cup on Hawkeyethenoo for Jim Goldie. By the end of the year, he had ridden 108 winners. In the 2014 season, he came third in the British flat racing jockey championship with 127 winners. The following season, he won the Ascot Gold Cup on Trip To Paris for Ed Dunlop, becoming the only jockey to have won the Ascot Gold Cup and the Grand National. There was further Group 1 success in 2018, when he won the Nunthorpe Stakes on Alpha Delphini for Bryan Smart. Although riding mostly on the flat, Lee had retained a dual licence in order to ride in bumpers (National Hunt flat races) and won on several occasions. He also won the 2018 jump jockeys' Nunthorpe in 2018.

== Injury and retirement ==
On 10 November 2023, Lee sustained a serious neck injury when unseated from Ben Macdui on leaving the stalls at Newcastle Racecourse. He was taken to the Royal Victoria Infirmary hospital in Newcastle, where he was admitted into intensive care and underwent surgery to stabilise fractures in his cervical spine. Two weeks later he was moved to the spinal unit at the James Cook University Hospital in Middlesbrough to be closer to his family in North Yorkshire. The fall left him paralysed from the shoulders down.

In December 2024, Lee received two Lester Awards, one special recognition award for the flat and one for jumps. In July 2024, Thirsk Racecourse inaugurated the Graham Lee Injured Jockeys Fund charity race, a hands and heels race for stable staff who are led up by professional jockeys. The race raised £20,000 for the Injured Jockeys Fund and was repeated the following year. In October 2025, Lee took part in an hour-long Racing TV documentary, Graham Lee: Beyond The Fall. In the programme, Lee said: "I was very fortunate in my career to ride big winners but at the end of the day, it's only horses running around a field. I'd give up every winner I ever rode to get up out of this chair and hug my wife and hug Amy and hug Robbie [his children]."

== Personal life ==
Lee is married to Becky and has two children, Amy and Robbie. The family live in Bedale in North Yorkshire.

== Grand National record ==
- 2003: Amberleigh House (3rd) – Ginger McCain
- 2004: Amberleigh House (1st) – Ginger McCain
- 2005: Amberleigh House (10th) – Ginger McCain
- 2006: Amberleigh House (Pulled up at 21st fence) – Ginger McCain
- 2007: Joe's Edge (Pulled up at 20th fence) – Ferdy Murphy
- 2008: Did not enter (injured)
- 2009: Kilbeggan Blade (Pulled up at 21st fence) – Tom George
- 2010: The Package (Unseated at 19th fence) – David Pipe
- 2011: Big Fella Thanks (7th) – Ferdy Murphy

== Cheltenham Festival winners (5) ==
- Stayers' Hurdle - (1) Inglis Drever (2005)
- Supreme Novices' Hurdle - (1) Arcalis (2005)
- Baring Bingham Novices' Hurdle - (1) No Refuge (2005)
- Centenary Novices' Handicap Chase - (2) L'Antartique (2007), Divers (2011)

== Major wins ==
(United Kingdom) Great Britain

- Ascot Gold Cup - (1) - Trip To Paris (2015)
- Nunthorpe Stakes - (1) - Alpha Delphini (2018)
- Betway Bowl - (1) - Grey Abbey (2005)
- Mildmay Novices' Chase - (1) - Aces Four (2007)
- Maghull Novices' Chase - (1) - Kalahari King (2009)

(Republic of Ireland) Ireland

- Swordlestown Cup Novice Chase - (1) Another Promise (2007)
