= Monty's Pass =

Irish racehorse (1993–2022)

- Sire: Montelimar
- Grandsire: Alleged
- Dam: Friars Pass
- Damsire: Monksfield
- Sex: Gelding
- Foaled: 23 April 1993
- Died: November 2022 (aged 29)
- Country: Ireland
- Colour: Bay
- Breeder: G. Slattery
- Owner: Mike Futter; Dee Racing Syndicate
- Trainer: James Mangan
- Record: 58: 9-12-11
- Earnings: £542,746

Major wins
- Denny Gold Medal Handicap Chase (2001); Kerry National (2002); Grand National (2003)

Monty's Pass (23 April 1993 – November 2022) was the winner of the 2003 Grand National at Aintree, Liverpool, when ridden by Barry Geraghty, trained by Jimmy Mangan and running in the colours of the Dee Racing Syndicate, a group of owners based in Donaghadee, Northern Ireland, and led by Blackpool born bingo hall owner Mike Futter.

Monty's Pass was bred in 1993 by Montelimar in Ireland and began racing in point-to-points before turning to chasing, finishing fifth in the Mildmay of Fleet chase at Cheltenham and second in the Topham Chase over the Grand National fences in 2002 before landing over £200,000 for his owners when winning the Kerry National.

The horse was lightly raced over hurdles in preparation for the 2003 Grand National in order to protect his handicap and was the subject of a huge gamble by the public on the day of the race, which saw his price tumble from 40/1 to 16/1 at the off. The horse won in what was considered by racing pundits to be one of the strongest Grand National fields of the previous two decades, landing a huge gamble of over £1 million for his owners in the process.

His partner in victory, Barry Geraghty, later said of the race, "I couldn't believe how easily he did it, he jumped like a cat all the way, it was fantastic!" Trainer, Jimmy Mangan said, " That was unbelievable, he did everything right. He travelled well all the way and after he passed me with a round to go I said to myself he could win! The day was perfect and so was his performance and I have always dreamed of having a runner in the great race not to mind having the winner!"

Monty's Pass finished fourth in the defence of his title in 2004 and completed the course again in 2005 before being retired to his trainer's yard at Conna in County Cork.

Monty's Pass died in November 2022, at the age of 29.
