= Numbersixvalverde =

Irish-bred Thoroughbred racehorse

- Sire: Broken Hearted
- Grandsire: Dara Monarch
- Dam: Queens Tricks
- Damsire: Le Bavard
- Sex: Gelding
- Foaled: 1996
- Country: Ireland
- Colour: Bay
- Breeder: Major F B Boyd and J G B Boyd
- Owner: Bernard Carroll
- Trainer: Martin Brassil
- Record: 36: 5-8-5
- Earnings: £590,054

Major wins
- Thyestes Chase (2005); Irish Grand National (2005); Grand National (2006)
- Last updated on April 17, 2007

Numbersixvalverde (born 1996) is an Irish race horse who won both the 2005 Irish Grand National and 2006 Aintree Grand National steeplechase, beating Hedgehunter by six lengths with Niall Madden in the saddle.

Numbersixvalverde won his big races in the colours of owner, Bernard Caroll, who named the horse after his holiday home in the Algarve. The horse returned to Aintree to defend his title in 2007, finishing sixth but pulled up injured and never raced again, finally being retired in January 2009.
