= McKelvey (horse) =

Irish-bred Thoroughbred racehorse

- Sire: Anshan
- Grandsire: Persian Bold
- Dam: Supreme Thought
- Damsire: Emarati
- Sex: Gelding
- Foaled: 5 August 1999
- Country: Ireland
- Colour: Bay
- Breeder: John Quane
- Owner: N Elliott
- Trainer: S Donohoe; Peter Bowen
- Record: 23:6-5-2
- Earnings: £247,762

Major wins
- English Summer National (2006)
- Last updated on 29 August 2008

McKelvey (August 5, 1999 - 5 April 2008) was an Irish-bred, British-trained thoroughbred racehorse, ridden by Tom O'Brien and trained by Peter Bowen.

== Racing career ==
McKelvey won the 2006 Summer National and came second in the 2007 Grand National. On 5 April 2008 during the 2008 Grand National he dislodged his rider at the twentieth fence, ran loose, jumping the next fence he stumbled on landing which made him fall under the barrier. As he got up, still under the barrier, he fractured his back and was euthanized on field.
