= Ten Up Novice Chase =

Steeplechase horse race in Ireland

Ten Up Novice Chase
2026
Oscars Brother	The Wallpark	Western Walk

Previous years
2025
Better Days Ahead	Stellar Story	Three Card Brag
2024
American Mike	Nick Rockett	Minella Cocooner
2023
Churchstonewarrior	Mahler Mission	Flanking Maneuver
2022
Farouk D'Alene	Beacon Edge	Braeside
2021
Coko Beach	Espanito Bello	Forza Milan

2020-2011
2020
Captain Cj	Elwood	Speak Easy
2019
Chris's Dream	Champagne Classic	Any Second Now
2018
Monbeg Notorious	Mossback	Moulin A Vent
2017
Acapella Bourgeois	Road To Respect	Haymount
2016
Measureofmydreams	Noble Endeavor	Pleasant Company
2015
Very Wood	Noble Emperor	Thunder And Roses
2014
Foxrock	My Murphy	Clar Na Mionn
2013
Terminal	Tofino Bay	He's A Delight
2012
Lion Na Bearnai	Four Commanders	Start Me Up
2011
Quito De La Roque	Royal De La Thinte	Slippers Percy

2010-2003
2010
Telenor	Uimhiraceathair	Inistioge
2009
Siegemaster	Equus Maximus	Operation Houdini
2008
Pomme Tiepy	Kilcrea Castle	Badgerlaw
2007
Snowy Morning	Gazza's Girl	Lovely Present
2006
Church Island	American Jennie	Homer Wells
2005
Point Barrow	Mullacash	Numbersixvalverde
2004
Satco Express	Lord Who	Supreme Touch
2003
The Premier Cat	Intelligent	Native Sessions

The Ten Up Novice Chase is a Grade 2 National Hunt steeplechase in Ireland. It is run at Navan Racecourse in February, over a distance of about 3 miles (4,828 metres). The race, commemorating the 1975 Cheltenham Gold Cup winner Ten Up, was first run in 2003.

== Records ==
Leading jockey (4 wins):

- Ruby Walsh - Snowy Morning (2007), Pomme Tiepy (2008), Uimhiraceathair (2010 - Dead Heat), Terminal (2013)
- Jack Kennedy - Monbeg Notorious (2018), Coko Beach (2021), Farouk D'alene (2022), American Mike (2023)

Leading trainer (5 wins):

- Willie Mullins – Snowy Morning (2007), Pomme Tiepy (2008), Uimhiraceathair (2010 - Dead Heat), Terminal (2013), Measureofmydreams (2016)
- Gordon Elliott - Monbeg Notorious (2018), Coko Beach (2021), Farouk D'alene (2022), American Mike (2024), Better Days Ahead (2025)

== Winners ==
- Amateur jockeys indicated by "Mr".

Year	Winner	Jockey	Trainer
2003	The Premier Cat	Shay Barry	Tom Cahill
2004	Satco Express	Shay Barry	Dusty Sheehy
2005	Point Barrow	J P Elliot	Pat Hughes
2006	Church Island	Andrew McNamara	Michael Hourigan
2007	Snowy Morning	Ruby Walsh	Willie Mullins
2008	Pomme Tiepy	Ruby Walsh	Willie Mullins
2009	Siegemaster	Davy Russell	Dessie Hughes
2010	Uimhiraceathair(DH)	Ruby Walsh	Willie Mullins
2010	Telenor (DH)	Andrew Lynch	Jim Dreaper
2011	Quito De La Roque	Davy Russell	Colm Murphy
2012	Lion Na Bearnai	Andrew Thornton	Thomas Gibney
2013	Terminal	Ruby Walsh	Willie Mullins
2014	Foxrock	Danny Mullins	Ted Walsh
2015	Noble Emperor (Note: Very Wood finished first in 2015 but was disqualified after failing a dope test)	Mark Walsh	Tony Martin
2016	Measureofmydreams	Paul Townend	Willie Mullins
2017	Acapella Bourgeois	Roger Loughran	Sandra Hughes
2018	Monbeg Notorious	Jack Kennedy	Gordon Elliott
2019	Chris's Dream	Rachael Blackmore	Henry De Bromhead
2020	Captain Cj	Conor Maxwell	Dermot McLoughlin
2021	Coko Beach	Jack Kennedy	Gordon Elliott
2022	Farouk D'alene	Jack Kennedy	Gordon Elliott
2023	Churchstonewarrior	Aidan Coleman	Jonathan Sweeney
2024	American Mike	Jack Kennedy	Gordon Elliott
2025	Better Days Ahead	Sam Ewing	Gordon Elliott
2026	Oscars Brother	Daniel King	Connor King

== See also ==
- Horseracing in Ireland
- List of Irish National Hunt races
