= 2025 Grand National =

Annual horse race in Aintree, England

- Grand National
- Location: Aintree
- Date: 5 April 2025
- Winning horse: Nick Rockett
- Starting price: 33/1
- Jockey: Patrick Mullins
- Trainer: Willie Mullins
- Owner: Stewart Andrew
- Conditions: Good to soft

The 2025 Grand National (officially known as the Randox 2025 Grand National for sponsorship reasons) was the 177th annual running of the Grand National horse race. It took place on Saturday 5 April 2025, at Aintree near Liverpool, England. The winner was Nick Rockett, trained by Willie Mullins and ridden by his son, amateur jockey Patrick Mullins.

== The race ==
The 2025 Grand National took place on Saturday 5 April 2025, at Aintree near Liverpool, England. There were an initial 90 entries in January 2025, with 34 runners (the maximum field size) confirmed on 3 April. Eighteen of the runners were trained in Ireland, including six from the yard of trainer Willie Mullins.

The runners raced over about 4 miles 2 1/2 furlongs (4 miles 550 yards; 7 kilometres), completing two circuits of the course and jumping thirty fences. The total prize fund was £1 million, with £500,000 awarded to the winner and progressively smaller sums to placed horses, down to £5,000 for tenth place. Following a spell of dry and sunny weather the course had been watered and the race was run on good to soft ground.

The race was won by 33/1 Nick Rockett, trained by Mullins and ridden by his son, amateur jockey Patrick Mullins. Nick Rockett jumped into the lead at the last and drew away from I Am Maximus, winner in 2024, on the run-in to win by two and a half lengths. Grangeclare West took third place to give Mullins a clean sweep of the first three places. The 13/2 favourite, Iroko, took fourth place. Sixteen runners completed the course; three horses fell; one horse was brought down; one horse unseated the rider; thirteen horses were pulled up.

Two horses were injured and assessed on the course before walking into a horse ambulance. Broadway Boy fell heavily at the 25th fence, Valentine's Brook, having been leading the field. He was able to return to his stables the following day. Celebre d'Allen collapsed on the run-in. Broadway Boy's jockey, Tom Bellamy, sustained a broken wrist in the fall. Nick Scholfield, who pulled up on Monbeg Genius, announced his retirement after the race. The winning jockey was given an eight-day suspension after the Whip Review Committee found he had used his whip eight times after the final fence, when the permitted number was seven times.

== Finishing order ==
Position	Name	Jockey	Age	Handicap (st-lb)	SP	Distance	Prize money
01	Nick Rockett	Patrick Mullins			33/1		£500,000
02	I Am Maximus	Paul Townend			7/1		£200,000
03	Grangeclare West	Brian Hayes			33/1		£100,000
04	Iroko	Jonjo O'Neill Jr			13/2 fav		£65,000
05	Meetingofthewaters	Danny Mullins			20/1		£40,000
06	Senior Chief	Darragh O'Keeffe			40/1		£30,000
07	Minella Cocooner	Jonathan Burke			18/1		£20,000
08	Hewick	Gavin Sheehan			14/1		£15,000
09	Minella Indo	Rachael Blackmore			20/1		£10,000
10	Twig	Beau Morgan			50/1		£5,000
11	Three Card Brag	Sean Bowen			16/1		
12	Beauport	Sam Twiston-Davies			33/1		
13	Horantzau D'Airy	Ciaran Gethings			150/1		
14	Vanillier	Sean Flanagan			12/1		
15	Bravemansgame	James Reveley			40/1		
16	Chantry House	James Bowen			66/1		

== Non-finishers ==
Fence	Name	Jockey	Age	Handicap (st-lb)	SP	Fate
03	Duffle Coat	Nick Scholfield			33/1	Unseated rider
09	Perceval Legallois	Mark Walsh			10/1	Fell
15	Coko Beach	Jody McGarvey			40/1	Pulled up
17	Royale Pagaille	Charlie Deutsch			100/1	Pulled up
17	Intense Raffles	JJ Slevin			14/1	Pulled up
21	Kandoo Kid	Harry Cobden			25/1	Fell
21	Appreciate It	Sean O'Keeffe			28/1	Brought down
22	Threeunderthrufive	Harry Skelton			40/1	Pulled up
22	Stay Away Fay	Paul O'Brien			66/1	Pulled up
25	Broadway Boy	Tom Bellamy			66/1	Fell
26	Hitman	Freddie Gingell			28/1	Pulled up
27	Monbeg Genius	Danny Gilligan			50/1	Pulled up
29	Conflated	Jordan Gainford			100/1	Pulled up
29	Stumptown	Keith Donoghue			10/1	Pulled up
29	Idas Boy	Harry Bannister			100/1	Pulled up
29	Fil Dor	Sam Ewing			50/1	Pulled up
29	Hyland	Nico de Boinville			22/1	Pulled up
Run-in	Celebre D'Allen	Micheal Nolan			125/1	Pulled up

== Broadcasting and media ==
"I Am Maximus on the outside of Nick Rockett. Grangeclare West, a mistake on the inside, likewise Minella Cocooner. Meetingofthewaters pulled out to have a crack at the front two. They head towards the elbow, Nick Rockett, I Am Maximus, bidding to retain his crown, Meetingofthewaters, Grangeclare West and Minella Cocooner. Nick Rockett for Patrick Mullins, trying to see off I Am Maximus for Paul Townend. Up towards the final 150 yards, Nick Rockett, hanging tough, I Am Maximus in second, Grangeclare West in third. And up towards the line, it's Nick Rockett's Grand National, for amateur Patrick Mullins."

— ITV lead commentator Richard Hoiles describes the climax of the race.

As the Grand National is accorded the status of an event of national interest in the United Kingdom and is listed on the Ofcom Code on Sports and Other Listed and Designated Events, it must be shown on free-to-air terrestrial television in the UK. The race was broadcast live on TV by ITV for the eighth time, and the second year in its new three year deal with the British Horseracing Authority.

The ITV coverage was presented by Ed Chamberlin. Analysis was provided by former jockeys Sir Anthony McCoy, Mick Fitzgerald, and Ruby Walsh. Reports were provided by Alice Plunkett, who spoke to the winning jockeys, Adele Mulrennan, who was in the pre-parade ring, Luke Harvey, who was down at the start and Matt Chapman, who spoke to the owners and trainers in the parade ring and winners enclosure. Betting updates were provided by Brian Gleeson. Oli Bell and Sam Quek covered viewers' comments on social media, and the commentary team was Mark Johnson, Stewart Machin and Richard Hoiles, who called the finish for the eighth time. Following the race, Bell and Walsh guided viewers on a fence-by-fence re-run of the race.

The race was also broadcast by BBC Radio 5 Live, whose team included Gina Bryce, former jockeys Andrew Thornton and Charlie Poste, John Hunt, Darren Owen, Gary O'Brien and Rob Nothman. Bryce became the first woman to commentate live on the race since course owner Mirabel Topham in 1952.

== Equine fatalities ==
The collapse of Celebre d'Allen on the run-in prompted a stewards' enquiry. His jockey Micheal Nolan received a 10-day suspension for having failed to pull up before the final fence when the horse was showing signs of tiring. Although Celebre d'Allen initially appeared to be making a recovery, he died three days after the race. The horse was the second fatality at the Grand National festival; the Mullins-trained Willy De Houelle sustained a fatal injury when falling in the Anniversary 4-Y-O Juvenile Hurdle on the first day of the meeting. Following the death of Celebre d'Allen, the BHA issued a statement which emphasised the veterinary checks and care given to Grand National runners and the steps taken to improve the safety of the race.

Animal rights groups responded with statements criticising the BHA and horse racing: Animal Aid blamed the BHA for allowing a thirteen-year-old horse to enter the Grand National; Animal Rising said that horse racing more generally was to blame. Animal welfare groups were more cautious: World Horse Welfare said they hoped lessons would be learned and the RSPCA said that they would await the results of the BHA investigation.

Post-mortem results showed that Celebre d'Allen died of pleuropneumonia, a bacterial lung infection, which developed into sepsis. Blood tests taken on Monday 7 April revealed an infection and a severely compromised immune system, although these indications had not been present in blood tests taken immediately after the race. These results led vets to conclude that Celebre d'Allen's collapse at the end of the race was not directly responsible for his death, although it could not be ruled out as a contributory factor. The BHA said: "The findings of the post-mortem state that the exercise-associated episode experienced by the horse after the race had concluded by the time of death".
