= 2005 Grand National =

English steeplechase horse race

- Grand National
- Location: Aintree
- Date: 9 April 2005
- Winning horse: (Republic of Ireland) Hedgehunter
- Starting price: 7/1 F
- Jockey: (Republic of Ireland) Ruby Walsh
- Trainer: (Republic of Ireland) Willie Mullins
- Owner: (England) Trevor Hemmings
- Conditions: Good to soft

External videos
- Replay of the 2005 Grand National in full Racing TV, YouTube

The 2005 Grand National (officially known as the John Smith's Grand National for sponsorship reasons) was the 158th official annual running of the Grand National steeplechase which took place at Aintree Racecourse near Liverpool, England, on 9 April 2005 and attracted the maximum permitted field of 40 competitors for total prize money of £700,000 including £406,000 to the winner.

The nine-year-old 7/1 favourite Hedgehunter, ridden by Ruby Walsh and trained by Willie Mullins, won the race by 14 lengths, in a time of 9 minutes 21 seconds. 40/1 shot Royal Auclair finished second, from 66/1-rated Simply Gifted in third.

The start of the race was moved back 25 minutes to avoid clashing with the wedding of Prince Charles and Camilla Parker Bowles. Over half of the field completed the course and all the horses returned safely, although Frenchman's Creek was retired afterward. There was much media interest in Carrie Ford, the rider of Forest Gunner, who was considered the first genuine opportunity a woman had to win a Grand National. The pairing was sent off as second-favourite and finished fifth.

The showpiece race was seen by the largest attendance at Aintree since the Monday National of 1997, with a crowd of 70,850 people, and a total of 151,660 over the course of the three-day meeting.

== Racecard ==
No	Horse	Age	Handicap (St-lb)	SP	Jockey	Trainer
1	Le Coudray (FR)	11	11-12	33/1	Conor O'Dwyer	Christy Roche
2	Royal Auclair (FR)	8	11-10	40/1	Christian Williams	Paul Nicholls
3	Monty's Pass (IRE)	12	11-06	33/1	Barry Geraghty	Jimmy Mangan
4	Fondmort (FR)	9	11-06	50/1	Mick Fitzgerald	Nicky Henderson
5	Take The Stand (IRE)	9	11-05	16/1	Leighton Aspell	Peter Bowen
6	Ballycassidy (IRE)	9	11-05	66/1	Seamus Durack	Peter Bowen
7	Ballybough Rasher (IRE)	10	11-04	100/1	Alan Dempsey	Howard Johnson
8	Risk Accessor (IRE)	10	11-04	100/1	Alan Crowe	Christy Roche
9	Bindaree (IRE)	11	11-03	33/1	Carl Llewellyn	Nigel Twiston-Davies
10	Amberleigh House (IRE)	13	11-03	16/1	Graham Lee	Ginger McCain
11	Hedgehunter (IRE)	9	11-01	7/1 F	Ruby Walsh	Willie Mullins
12	Foly Pleasant (FR)	11	11-00	50/1	Andrew Thornton	Karen Waldron
13	Astonville (FR)	11	10-13	100/1	Brian Crowley	Michael Scudamore
14	Ad Hoc (IRE)	11	10-12	33/1	Joe Tizzard	Paul Nicholls
15	Heros Collonges (FR)	10	10-11	66/1	John McNamara	Paul Nicholls
16	Glenelly Gale (IRE)	11	10-11	150/1	Mr Tom Greenall	Arthur Moore
17	It Takes Time (IRE)	11	10-11	18/1	Timmy Murphy	Martin Pipe
18	Clan Royal (FR)	10	10-11	9/1	Tony McCoy	Jonjo O'Neill
19	Nil Desperandum (IRE)	8	10-11	16/1	Jim Culloty	Francis Crowley
20	Joly Bey (FR)	8	10-10	16/1	Mr David Dunsdon	Nick Gifford
21	Jakari (FR)	8	10-10	33/1	Richard Johnson	Henry Daly
22	Frenchman's Creek	11	10-09	50/1	Jimmy McCarthy	Hughie Morrison
23	Iznogoud (FR)	9	10-09	125/1	Tom Scudamore	Martin Pipe
24	Polar Red	8	10-08	100/1	Tom Malone	Martin Pipe
25	Double Honour (FR)	7	10-08	25/1	Paddy Brennan	Philip Hobbs
26	Forest Gunner	11	10-07	8/1	Carrie Ford	Richard Ford
27	Colonel Rayburn (IRE)	9	10-07	20/1	Paul Carberry	Paul Nolan
28	Just In Debt (IRE)	9	10-07	33/1	Tony Dobbin	Martin Todhunter
29	Spot Thedifference (IRE)	12	10-07	25/1	Robbie Power	Enda Bolger
30	Innox (FR)	9	10-06	16/1	Robert Thornton	Francois Doumen
31	Strong Resolve (IRE)	9	10-06	9/1	Peter Buchanan	Lucinda Russell
32	Shamawan (IRE)	10	10-06	200/1	Shay Barry	Jonjo O'Neill
33	Lord Atterbury (IRE)	9	10-06	25/1	Mark Bradburne	Martin Pipe
34	Europa	9	10-06	150/1	Jason Maguire	Ferdy Murphy
35	Merchants Friend (IRE)	10	10-06	80/1	Noel Fehily	Charlie Mann
36	Simply Gifted	10	10-06	66/1	Brian Harding	Jonjo O'Neill
37	Arctic Copper (IRE)	11	10-06	200/1	Davy Russell	Noel Meade
38	Native Emperor	9	10-05	100/1	Dominic Elsworth	Jonjo O'Neill
39	Marcus Du Berlais (FR)	8	10-05	25/1	Barry Cash	Arthur Moore
40	L'Aventure (FR)	6	10-05	66/1	Bobby McNally	Paul Nicholls

== Finishing order ==
Position	Name	Rider	Age	Weight (st-lb)	SP	Distance or fate
1st	Hedgehunter	Ruby Walsh	9	11–1	7/1 F	14 lengths
2nd	Royal Auclair	Christian Williams	8	11–10	40/1	A head
3rd	Simply Gifted	Brian Harding	10	10–6	66/1	4 lengths
4th	It Takes Time	Timmy Murphy	11	10–11	18/1	9 lengths
5th	Forest Gunner	Carrie Ford	11	10–7	8/1	½ length
6th	Nil Desperandum	Jim Culloty	8	10–11	16/1	11 lengths
7th	Innox	Robert Thornton	9	10–6	11/1	3½ lengths
8th	Heros Collonges	John P. McNamara	10	10–11	66/1	2½ lengths
9th	Just in Debt	Tony Dobbin	9	10–7	33/1	5 lengths
10th	Amberleigh House	Graham Lee	13	11–3	16/1	1½ lengths
11th	Bindaree	Carl Llewellyn	11	11–3	33/1	1 length
12th	Iznogoud	Tom Scudamore	9	10–9	125/1	1¼ lengths
13th	Polar Red	Tom Malone	8	10–8	100/1	9 lengths
14th	Joly Bay	Mr. David Dunsdon	8	10–10	16/1	15 lengths
15th	L'aventure	Robbie McNally	6	10–5	66/1	5 lengths
16th	Monty's Pass	Barry Geraghty	12	11–6	33/1	6 lengths
17th	Strong Resolve	Peter Buchanan	9	10/6	9/1	16 lengths
18th	Spot Thedifference	Robbie Power	12	10–7	25/1	17 lengths
19th	Arctic Copper	Davy Russell	11	10–6	200/1	21 lengths
20th	Europa	Jason Maguire	9	10–6	150/1	14 lengths
21st	Shamawan	James Barry	10	10–6	200/1	Last to finish
Non finishers						
Fence 28	Fondmort	Mick Fitzgerald	9	11–6	50/1	Tailed off, pulled up
Fence 28	Glenelly Gale	Mr. Tom Greenall	11	10–11	150/1	Tailed off, pulled up
Fence 27 (open ditch)	Colonel Rayburn	Paul Carberry	9	10–7	20/1	Tailed off, pulled up
Fence 22 (Becher's Brook)	Clan Royal	Tony McCoy	10	10–11	9/1	Carried out by loose horses
	Ad Hoc	Joe Tizzard	11	10–12	33/1	Fell
	Marcus Du Berlais	Barry Cash	8	10–5	25/1	Unseated rider
	Ballybough Rasher	Alan Dempsey	10	11-04	100/1	Refused
Fence 21	Double Honour	Paddy Brennan	7	10–8	25/1	Fell
	Le Coudray	Conor O'Dwyer	11	11–12	33/1	Tailed off, pulled up
Fence 20	Foly Pleasant	Andrew Thornton	11	11–0	50/1	Fell
Fence 19 (open ditch)	Jakari	Richard Johnson	8	10–10	33/1	Tailed off, pulled up
Fence 15 (The Chair)	Take The Stand	Leighton Aspell	9	11–5	16/1	Unseated rider
Fence 13	Astonville	Brian Crowley	11	10–13	100/1	Pulled up
Fence 10	Merchant's Friend	Noel Fehily	10	10–6	80/1	Fell
Fence 9 (Valentine's)	Native Emperor	Dominic Elsworth	9	10–5	100/1	Unseated rider
Fence 2	Ballycassidy	Seamus Durack	9	11–5	66/1	Unseated rider
	Risk Accessor	Alan Crowe	10	11–4	100/1	Unseated rider
Fence 1	Lord Atterbury	Mark Bradburne	9	10–6	25/1	Fell
	Frenchman's Creek	James McCarthy	11	10–9	50/1	Unseated rider

== Media coverage & course modifications ==
Ruby Walsh has sailed over the last in front on Hedgehunter... They're at the elbow in the National. Ruby Walsh is going strongly. He's six lengths clear of Royal Auclair and Simply Gifted... and Ruby Walsh is going to win the Grand National! Fell at the last last year but too good for them this time! Hedgehunter wins it, a second Grand National for Ruby.

— Commentator Jim McGrath describes the climax of the race

The race was covered live by the BBC on television and radio in the United Kingdom in accordance with the Ofcom Code on Sports and Other Listed and Designated Events which recognises the Grand National as a sporting event of significant public interest.

The television coverage was presented by Sue Barker and Clare Balding and was part of a Grandstand special for the 46th consecutive year. Race commentary was provided by a four-man team consisting of Ian Bartlett, Tony O'Hehir, Darren Owen, and lead commentator Jim McGrath who called the runners home for the eighth year.

Becher's Brook was modified slightly after a mini pile-up in the 2004 renewal. Running water was back at the fence for the first time since 1989 which was covered over by rubber matting.

== Jockeys ==
Carl Llewellyn had been the senior rider in the weighing room since the retirement of Richard Dunwoody after the 1999 race and became only the ninth rider ever to weigh out for a 15th National, having previously won the race in 1992 and 1998.

Nine riders made their Grand National debut, with Christian Williams finishing second and Carrie Ford fifth, while Tom Malone, David Dunsdon, Peter Buchanon and Robbie Power also completed the course. However, Alan Crowe's first ride ended at the second fence while Paddy Brennan and Tom Greenall also failed to reach the finishing post.
