= Jody McGarvey =

Irish jockey

Jody McGarvey (born 14 November 1990) is a retired Irish jockey who competed in National Hunt racing. McGarvey rode the winners of 173 races in a career which began in 2012 and ended with his retirement after riding at Punchestown on 1 May 2025. He was particularly associated with horses owned by J. P. McManus, for whom he rode the winners of three Grade 1 races.

== Major wins ==
(Republic of Ireland) Ireland

- Ryanair Novice Chase - (1) Great Field (2017)
- Mares Novice Hurdle Championship Final - (1) Skyace (2021)
- Underwriting Exchange Gold Cup Novice Chase - (1) Janidil (2021)
- Drinmore Novice Chase - (1) I Am Maximus (2023)
