= Amberleigh House =

Irish-bred Thoroughbred racehorse

- Sire: Buckskin
- Grandsire: Yelapa
- Dam: Chancy Gal
- Damsire: Al Sirat
- Sex: Gelding
- Foaled: 24 May 1992
- Died: 27 April 2017 (aged 24)
- Country: Ireland
- Colour: Bay
- Breeder: Robert McCarthy
- Owner: Ms. A. L .Dikel; Halewood International
- Trainer: Michael Hourigan; Ginger McCain
- Record: 73: 9-10-10
- Earnings: £556,432

Major wins
- Kinloch Brae Chase (2000); Emo Oil Chase (2000); Becher Chase (2001); Grand National (2004)

Amberleigh House (24 May 1992 – 27 April 2017) was the horse that won the 2004 Grand National.

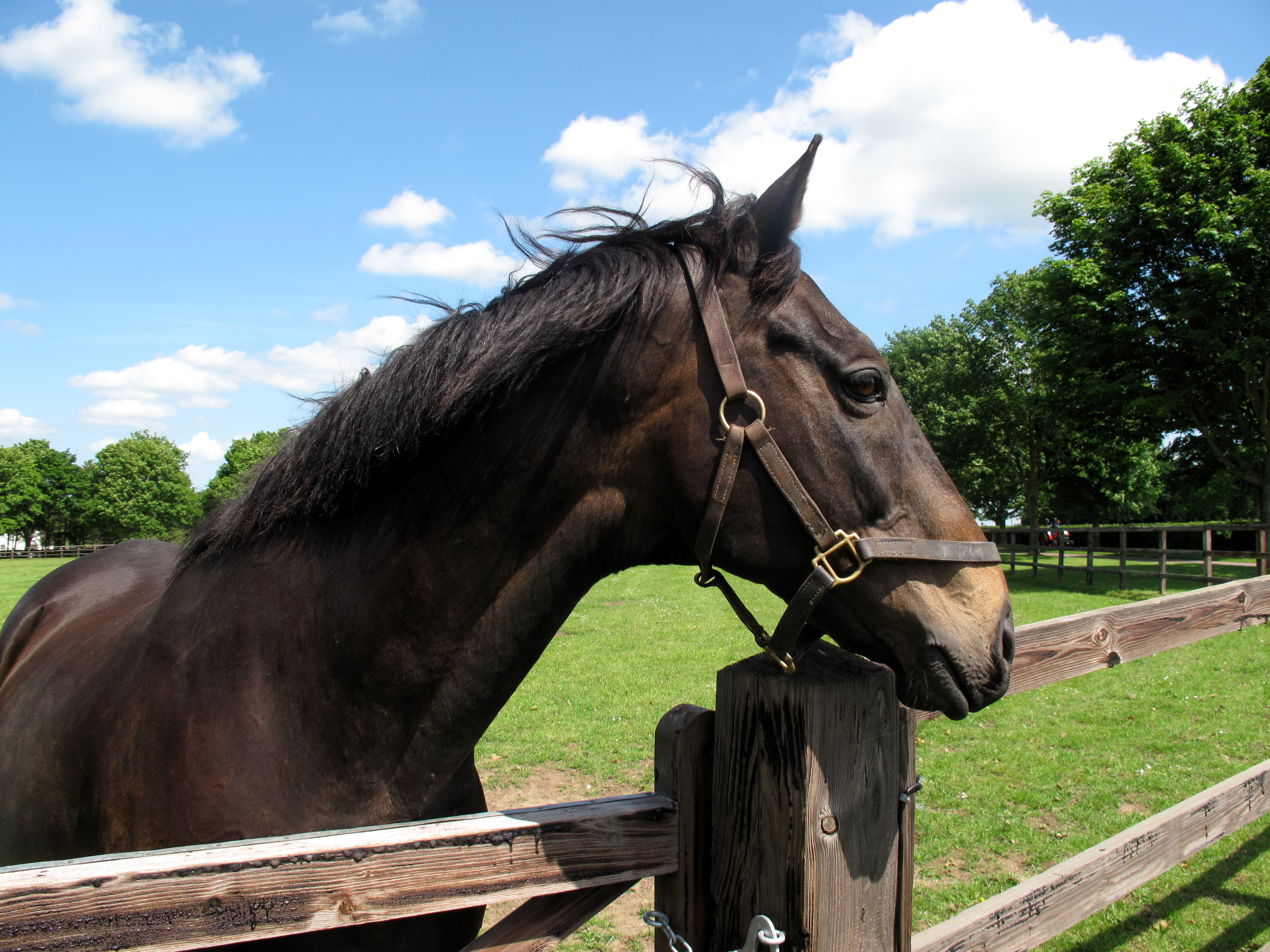
Amberleigh House - 2004 Grand National Winner

== Staff ==
Amberleigh House was trained by Ginger McCain, and was usually ridden by jockey Graham Lee, amongst others. Lee rode Amberleigh House to his Grand National win.

== Grand National ==
Amberleigh House won the 2004 Grand National, evoking memories of Red Rum's previous triumphs for trainer Ginger McCain. A 16/1 chance on the day, he was racing 20 lengths behind the leading trio of Clan Royal, Hedgehunter, and Lord Atterbury with four fences remaining. Hedgehunter then suffered a tired fall, and Clan Royal nearly took the wrong course. With Lord Atterbury tiring, Graham Lee brought Amberleigh House down the outside to grab the lead inside the final furlong and win by three lengths.

Amberleigh House made his Grand National debut in 2001, being brought down in a melee at the 8th fence, the Canal Turn.

Since then, Amberleigh House competed in four more Grand Nationals, ridden by Graham Lee on each occasion. In total, he raced 11 times over the National fences (including races shorter than the Grand National) and never fell.

=== Grand National Results ===
- 2001 Brought down at fence 8 Canal Turn
- 2003 Third
- 2004 Winner
- 2005 Tenth
- 2006 Pulled up before fence 21

== Retirement ==
After being pulled up in the 2006 Grand National, Amberleigh House was retired.

Amberleigh House lived out his retirement at the National Stud in Newmarket and later, on a farm outside Chester where he was looked after by the trainer Lisa Williamson. He took part in a parade of former winners before the 2017 Grand National but suffered an attack of colic a week later. He died on 27 April at the age of 24. Williamson explained "We did everything we could to save him. He was operated on but unfortunately he didn't make it. He's enjoyed a very happy retirement with me in Cheshire. He has been very busy with his public appearances and it was nice that his last one was on Grand National day".
