= Hedgehunter =

Irish-bred Thoroughbred racehorse

- Sire: Montelimar
- Grandsire: Alleged
- Dam: Aberedw
- Damsire: Caerwent
- Sex: Gelding
- Foaled: 25 January 1996
- Country: Ireland
- Colour: Bay
- Breeder: Mary Lang & J. Anthony Keough
- Owner: Trevor Hemmings
- Trainer: Willie Mullins
- Record: 40: 5-15-2
- Earnings: £784,593

Major wins
- Thyestes Chase (2004); Bobbyjo Chase (2005); Grand National (2005)

Hedgehunter (born 25 January 1996) is an Irish race horse, who won the 2005 Grand National steeplechase, ridden by Ruby Walsh and trained by Willie Mullins. He had fallen at the final fence the previous year when well placed. He then finished second in 2006 to Numbersixvalverde. He also finished second in the 2006 Cheltenham Gold Cup to War of Attrition. The horse was owned by Lancashire billionaire Trevor Hemmings who also owned Blackpool Tower.

== Racing career ==
=== Early career ===
Hedgehunter was foaled in January 1996 on the Tully Hill Stud in Dublin. He was bred by Mary Lang and her uncle, Tony Keogh. He was sold ten months later on 5 November for £3,200 at National Hunt Sales in Tattersalls Fairyhouse Ireland. Niall F Quaid bought him and put him into training with Willie Mullins.

In his first season, he ran in and finished second in four National Hunt Flat Races. It wasn't until the end of the following season he managed to win a sixteen-runner Maiden Hurdle at Clonmel.

=== Chase career ===
The next season, he went Novice chasing winning the Grand National Trial at Punchestown Gowran Park and ran at the 2003 Cheltenham Festival in the National Hunt Chase. He moved to dispute the lead before making a mistake at the second last fence and almost losing his jockey. He made one more racecourse appearance that season finishing second to the Royal and Sun Alliance Chase winner Rule Supreme at the Punchestown Festival.

He began the 2004–2005 season chasing home the classy Strong Flow to finish fourth in the Hennessy Gold Cup at Newbury Racecourse. Next he finished third to the Grand National winner Bindaree in the Welsh National, before winning the prestigious Thyestes chase at Gowran Park.

=== 2004 Grand National ===
His first run in the Grand National was in 2004. He led the field as they turned for home before tiring and falling at the last when in third, unlucky not to finish close behind the winner Amberleigh House.

=== 2005 Grand National ===
The race began at a furious pace and despite making a slight mistake at the tenth fence and Ruby Walsh almost losing his irons Hedgehunter was chasing the well fancied Clan Royal. As the field approached Becher's Brook a loose horse swerved in front of the leader, and stopping him from jumping the fence. This left Hedgehunter in the lead 8 fences from the finish and he led the field over the last fence. He was travelling very well up the run in when Walsh asked him to quicken and he put a dozen lengths between himself and the second horse.

=== 2006 Grand National ===
Starting 5/1 joint favourite for the 2006 National, Hedgehunter carried top weight of 11 stone 12 (166 lb, 75 kg) and came off of a hard race a few weeks earlier when he finished second in the Cheltenham Gold Cup. He finished six lengths second behind Numbersixvalverde. Few horses have been so close in three consecutive Grand Nationals since Red Rum.

=== 2007 Grand National ===
Starting with odds of 14-1 and again carrying top weight, finished in 9th place.

=== 2008 Grand National ===
Starting with odds of 20–1, he'd finish 13th of 15 finishers, again with top-weight.

== Retirement ==
On 10 April 2008, at 12 years old, Hedgehunter was retired by his owner, having amassed three quarters of a million pounds in prize money.
