= Ofcom Code on Sports and Other Listed and Designated Events =

UK television regulations

The Ofcom Code on Sports and Other Listed & Designated Events is a series of regulations issued originally by the Independent Television Commission (ITC) then by Ofcom when the latter assumed most of the ITC's responsibilities in 2003, which is designed to protect the availability of coverage of major sporting occasions on free-to-air terrestrial television in the United Kingdom.

In 1991, the Home Secretary, Kenneth Baker, devised a list of events not permitted to be broadcast solely on pay television services. The practice was placed on a statutory footing by the Broadcasting Act 1996, which required the ITC to create a permanent list of such events, dubbed the "crown jewels of sport". In 1997, the initial list was drawn up, and was revised in 1999, where the code was divided into two categories, A and B. The code was further amended in 2000 to give the ITC responsibility over UK-based broadcasters wanting to transmit listed events in other countries.

== Eligible broadcasters ==
Listed events may only be televised by eligible broadcasters, carrying a signal on a PSB multiplex on Freeview that covers at least 95% of the population, and must be carried by cable, satellite, and streaming IPTV services. The eligible broadcasters are the BBC, ITV, Channel 4, and Channel 5.

== Category A ==
Category A events are events which must have live coverage made available to free-to-air channels, although pay television networks may share live coverage. As of 2026, these events are:

Association football:

- FIFA World Cup (all matches)
- FIFA Women's World Cup (all matches)
- UEFA European Championship (all matches)
- UEFA Women's Championship (all matches)
- FA Cup Final
- Scottish Cup Final (in Scotland only)

Horse racing:

- Grand National
- Epsom Derby

Rugby league football:

- Challenge Cup final

Rugby union football:

- World Cup final

Tennis:

- Wimbledon Championships finals (both men's and women's)

Multi-sport events:

- Olympic Games (both summer and winter)
- Paralympic Games (both summer and winter)

== Category B ==
Category B events can be shown on pay television, provided sufficient secondary coverage (highlights, delayed broadcast, etc.) is made available to free-to-air broadcasters. As of 2022, the events covered by this category are:

Association football:

- UEFA Nations League
- UEFA European Championship Qualifiers
- UEFA European Under-21 Championship
- UEFA Youth European Championships
- FIFA World Cup qualification

Athletics:

- IAAF World Championships

Cricket:

- Test matches played in England
- World Cup (the final, semi-finals, and any matches involving the Home Nations)

Golf:

- The Open Championship
- Ryder Cup

Rugby union football:

- World Cup (excluding the final)
- Six Nations Championship matches involving the Home Nations

Tennis:

- Wimbledon Championships (excluding the finals)

Multi-sport events:

- Commonwealth Games

== Cricket ==
The England cricket team's home Test matches were originally a Category A event. However, the England and Wales Cricket Board negotiated for it to be transferred to Category B and subsequently, and controversially, sold exclusive live broadcast rights for the 2006–09 home cricket seasons to Sky Sports. During the 2019 Cricket World Cup, bowing to public pressure, Sky stated that it would sub-license the final to Channel 4 (who sub-licensed highlights rights) if England were to qualify. England would advance, and beat New Zealand to win the title, in one of the first top-flight cricket matches aired free-to-air since 2005. Following the tournament, renewed calls emerged for test matches and/or the Cricket World Cup to be added to Category A.

== Proposed changes ==
=== 2009 review ===
In 2008 (in the lead-up to digital switchover), Ofcom began an independent review, led by David Davies, into the contents and organisation of the listed events criteria. On 30 July 2009, the BBC proposed that the list be expanded and reorganised to include a new "A1" category above the existing category A (renamed A3), designating that the event must be aired live in their entirety on free-to-air channels (such as the FIFA World Cup, UEFA Euro, and the Olympics), and "A2" for events seen as only important to one Home Nation and that must be broadcast in their entirety on free-to-air channels within said nation (such as the FA Cup final in England and the Scottish Cup final in Scotland). List A3 (requiring FTA highlights) would add the Cricket World Cup final and ICC World Twenty20 final, British and Irish Lions tours, and FIFA Women's World Cup, UEFA Women's Championship and Women's Cricket World Cup matches involving Home Nations.

The Davies review panel recommended the abolition of Category B in its entirely, leaving a single slate of listed events that must be televised in their entirety on British FTA television unless otherwise noted, including the Summer Olympics, FIFA World Cup and UEFA European Championship, the FA Cup final (outside of Scotland), the Scottish Cup final (inside Scotland), the Rugby World Cup, the Grand National, and Wimbledon. It was also proposed that qualifying matches for Euro and the World Cup that involve Home Nations (within the participating nations), the Ashes home tests, and Wales matches at the Six Nations Championship (in Wales) be added to the list. The Epsom Derby, rugby league Challenge Cup final, and the Winter Olympics were removed under the proposal.

=== 2019–2020 changes ===
In July 2019, Secretary of State for Digital, Culture, Media and Sport (DCMS) Jeremy Wright announced a consultation on adding the FIFA Women's World Cup and Paralympic Games to Category A. The 2019 FIFA Women's World Cup was televised in its entirety by the BBC, with total viewership of 28.1 million across the entire tournament. In September 2019, Wright's successor Nicky Morgan stated that she had begun to seek input with rightsholders on adding more women's sporting events to category A, in order to place them on "equal footing" with their men's counterparts. She was also pursuing updates to the listed event rules to account for changes in viewer habits prompted by digital platforms.

The summer and winter Paralympics were added to Category A in January 2020; The Times reported a final decision on the FIFA Women's World Cup and UEFA European Women's Championship is to come in the future, but both events are likely to see inclusion. The government declined to add the Ashes, the UEFA Champions League Final, and the Open Championship to the list.

In March 2020, Director-General of the BBC Tony Hall called for the Six Nations Championship to be promoted to Category A, amid reports that the competition was seeking to include a pay television component (or: otherwise sign exclusively with a pay television broadcaster) in its broadcast contract for 2022 onward. The Six Nations is currently divided between the BBC and ITV, airing FTA in its entirety. An associated proposal by the committee of DCMS was rejected.

== Olympics and Warner Bros. Discovery ==
In 2015, in contrast to prior deals with national broadcasters via the European Broadcasting Union (EBU), the International Olympic Committee licensed all Olympic television rights covering Europe as a region to Discovery, Inc., primarily via its Eurosport channels, and Discovery-owned FTA broadcasters in selected markets. In order to fulfil the requirements of the 1996 Act, Discovery sub-licensed a proportion of the rights back to the BBC for free to air broadcast. However, starting from Tokyo 2020, this deal had the effect of substantially reducing the extent of free-to-air coverage to a single broadcast TV channel and a single online stream, with the majority of live coverage carried on pay television via Discovery's Eurosport brand. This led to complaints in the media due to the reduced free live coverage, in particular missing performances by British athletes.

In 2023, the agreement was renewed through the 2032 Summer Olympics by corporate successor Warner Bros. Discovery. Unlike the previous agreement, where the BBC was required to sub-license these rights directly from Discovery, the renewal includes a sub-licensing agreement with the EBU itself, guaranteeing its members (including the BBC) the ability to carry at least 200 hours of Summer Olympics coverage per-Olympiad, and 100 hours for the Winter Olympics.

It should be noted following the merger of Warner Bros. and Paramount in October 2026, Channel 5 is also owned by the new Skydance Corporation. Channel 5 could eventually take over rights currently held by the BBC due to common ownership.

== See also ==
- Anti-siphoning law
- Broadcasting of sports events
- Public service broadcasting in the United Kingdom
