= 2023 Grand National =

175th Grand National horse race

- Grand National
- Location: Aintree
- Date: 15 April 2023
- Winning horse: (Republic of Ireland) Corach Rambler
- Starting price: 8/1 F
- Jockey: (Republic of Ireland) Derek Fox
- Trainer: (Scotland) Lucinda Russell
- Owner: The Ramblers
- Conditions: Good to soft

External videos
- Full replay of the 2023 Grand National Racing TV, YouTube
- Full replay of the 2023 Grand National ITV Racing, YouTube

The 2023 Grand National (officially known as the Randox 2023 Grand National for sponsorship reasons) was the 175th annual running of the Grand National horse race. It took place on Saturday 15 April 2023, at Aintree Racecourse near Liverpool, England. The event was sponsored by Randox Health with Natasha Jonas acting as ambassador.

The race was won by Corach Rambler who was trained by Lucinda Russell in Scotland and ridden by Irish jockey Derek Fox, who had both previously won the Grand National in 2017 with One For Arthur.

The race start was delayed by 14 minutes, following protests by campaign group Animal Rising, the first such disruptions since the cancellation of the 1993 Grand National due to a series of false starts and the 1997 Grand National due to the IRA bomb threat. Merseyside Police made 118 arrests, for both "criminal damage and public nuisance offences".

== Entries and weights ==
The initial entry of 85 horses was published on 7 February 2023. Only 31 of the horses entered were trained in Great Britain, compared to 54 in the initial entry for the 2022 race. Of the Irish-trained runners, 21 were trained by Gordon Elliott, who was seeking a fourth Grand National victory as a trainer. Bookmakers made 2022 winner Noble Yeats 10-1 favourite at the time of the entries.

Weight for the race were announced on 21 February 2023. Three horses were given the top weight of 11 stones and 12 pounds; Any Second Now (the 2022 runner-up), Conflated and Hewick. Galvin and Noble Yeats were just behind on 11 stone 11, and Noble Yeats remained the betting favourite at a best price of 11-1. Publication of the weights opened up the possibility that the final field would be dominated by Irish-trained runners, with 41 of the top 60 in the weights trained in Ireland.

Nine horses were withdrawn at the acceptance stage on 7 March. Amongst the withdrawals were the 2021 winner Minella Times, who had been retired, and the fourth-placed horse from 2021 Burrows Saint. Iwilldoit was withdrawn having failed to meet the requirements of running in six steeplechases before 19 February. The withdrawals left 73 possible runners remaining with the next acceptance stage due on 28 March.

A further sixteen horses were withdrawn at the 28 March acceptance stage to leave 57 possible runners. The fifth-placed horse from 2021, Farclas, was amongst the withdrawals and other notable scratchings included Becher Chase winner Ashtown Lad and the 2022 Irish Grand National winner Lord Lariat. The betting at this stage was headed by 6-1 chance Corach Rambler, who had won the Ultima Handicap Chase for a second consecutive year, followed by Noble Yeats at 8-1. Only Any Second Now remained from the three top-weighted horses as Conflated and Hewick were withdrawn.

Final confirmations were made on 10 April and seven more horses were withdrawn, leaving 50 possible runners. Corach Rambler remained as the general 6-1 betting favourite with Noble Yeats at 8-1 and Delta Work at 10-1.

== Race card ==
The 40 runners were finalised on Thursday 13 April. There were no withdrawals at Thursday's declaration stage. In a change from previous years, no reserves were declared. Escaria Ten, who finished ninth in the 2022 race, was declared a non-runner on the day.

No	Horse	Age	Handicap (st–lb)	Odds	Jockey	Trainer
1	Any Second Now	11	11-12	14/1	Mark Walsh	Ted Walsh
2	Noble Yeats	8	11-11	10/1	Sean Bowen	Emmet Mullins
3	Galvin	9	11-11	22/1	Davy Russell	Gordon Elliott
4	Fury Road	9	11-6	33/1	Jonjo O'Neill Jr	Gordon Elliott
5	The Big Dog	10	11-5	12/1	Aidan Coleman	Peter Fahey
6	Capodanno	7	11-5	22/1	Danny Mullins	Willie Mullins
7	Delta Work	10	11-4	11/1	Keith Donoghue	Gordon Elliott
8	Sam Brown	10	11-4	66/1	Johnny Burke	Anthony Honeyball
9	Lifetime Ambition	8	11-3	33/1	Sean O'Keefe	Jessica Harrington
10	Carefully Selected	11	11-1	33/1	Michael O'Sullivan	Willie Mullins
11	Coko Beach	8	11-0	28/1	Harry Cobden	Gordon Elliott
12	Longhouse Poet	9	11-0	20/1	JJ Slevin	Martin Brassil
13	Gaillard Du Mesnil	7	11-0	10/1	Paul Townend	Willie Mullins
14	Darasso	10	11-1	100/1	Luke Dempsey	Joseph O'Brien
15	Le Milos	8	10-11	12/1	Harry Skelton	Dan Skelton
17	The Big Breakaway	8	10-10	40/1	Brendan Powell	Joe Tizzard
18	Cape Gentleman	7	10-8	100/1	Jody McGarvey	Shark Hanlon
19	Roi Mage	11	10-8	33/1	Felix de Giles	Patrick Griffin
20	Diol Ker	9	10-8	100/1	Kieren Buckley	Noel Meade
21	A Wave Of The Sea	7	10-6	66/1	Shane Fitzgerald	Joseph O'Brien
22	Minella Trump	9	10-6	50/1	Theo Gillard	Donald McCain
23	Vanillier	8	10-6	20/1	Sean Flanagan	Gavin Cromwell
24	Velvet Elvis	7	10-6	25/1	Darragh O'Keeffe	Thomas Gibney
25	Ain't That A Shame	9	10-5	10/1	Rachael Blackmore	Henry de Bromhead
26	Corach Rambler	9	10-5	8/1	Derek Fox	Lucinda Russell
27	Enjoy D'allen	9	10-5	50/1	Simon Torrens	Ciaran Murphy
28	Mr Incredible	7	10-4	14/1	Brian Hayes	Willie Mullins
29	Mister Coffey	8	10-4	33/1	Nico de Boinville	Nicky Henderson
30	Cloudy Glen	10	10-4	80/1	Charlie Deutsch	Venetia Williams
31	Hill Sixteen	10	10-2	80/1	Ryan Mania	Sandy Thomson
32	Gabby's Cross	8	10-2	50/1	Peter Carberry	Henry de Bromhead
33	Recite A Prayer	8	10-1	80/1	Jack Foley	Willie Mullins
34	Eva's Oscar	9	10-1	50/1	Alan Johns	Tim Vaughan
35	Our Power	8	10-0	25/1	Sam Twiston-Davies	Sam Thomas
36	Dunboyne	8	10-0	50/1	Jack Tudor	Gordon Elliott
37	Francky Du Berlais	8	9-8	125/1	Ben Jones	Peter Bowen
38	Fortescue	9	9-13	100/1	Hugh Nugent	Henry Daly
39	Back On The Lash	9	9-13	22/1	Adam Wedge	Martin Keighley
40	Born By The Sea	9	9-10	50/1	Philip Enright	Paul Gilligan

== Finishing order ==
Placed horses

1: Corach Rambler

2: Vanillier

3: Gaillard Du Mesnil

4: Noble Yeats

Position	Name	Age	Handicap (st–lb)	SP	Distance	Jockey	Trainer	Prize money
1	Corach Rambler	9	10–5	8/1 Fav		Derek Fox	Lucinda Russell	£561,300
2	Vanillier	8	10–6	20/1	2¼ lengths	Sean Flanagan	Gavin Cromwell	£211,100
3	Gaillard Du Mesnil	7	11–0	10/1	4¾ lengths	Paul Townend	Willie Mullins	£105,500
4	Noble Yeats	8	11–11	10/1	1½ lengths	Sean Bowen	Emmet Mullins	£52,700
5	The Big Dog	10	11–5	12/1	Neck	Aidan Coleman	Peter Fahey	£26,500
6	Born By The Sea	9	10–2	50/1	1¼ lengths	Philip Enright	Paul Gilligan	£13,200
7	Roi Mage	11	10–8	33/1	3¾ lengths	Felix de Giles	Patrick Griffin	£6,800
8	Mister Coffey	8	10–4	33/1	12 lengths	Nico de Boinville	Nicky Henderson	£3,600
9	A Wave Of The Sea	7	10–6	66/1	2¾ lengths	Shane Fitzgerald	Joseph O'Brien	£2,000
10	Le Milos	8	10–11	12/1	7 lengths	Harry Skelton	Dan Skelton	£1,000
11	Our Power	8	10–2	25/1	19 lengths	Sam Twiston-Davies	Sam Thomas	
12	Enjoy D'allen	9	10–5	50/1	3¼ lengths	Simon Torrens	Ciaran Murphy	
13	Fortescue	9	10–2	100/1	7 lengths	Hugh Nugent	Henry Daly	
14	Carefully Selected	11	11–1	50/1	20 lengths	Michael O'Sullivan	Willie Mullins	
15	Minella Trump	9	10–6	50/1	½ lengths	Theo Gillard	Donald McCain Jnr	
16	Francky Du Berlais	10	10–2	125/1	20 lengths	Ben Jones	Paul Bowen	
17	Ain't That A Shame	9	10–5	10/1	¾ lengths	Rachael Blackmore	Henry De Bromhead	

== Non-finishers ==
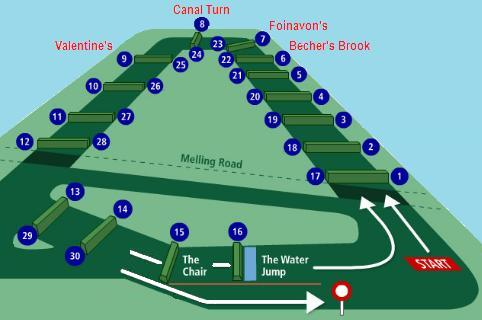
Overview of the 4½-mile National Course at Aintree with thirty fences.

Fence	Name	Jockey	Fate
1	Cloudy Glen	Charlie Deutsch	Unseated rider
1	Diol Ker	Kieren Buckley	Unseated rider
1	Galvin	Davy Russell	Unseated rider
1	Hill Sixteen	Ryan Mania	Fell
1	Recite A Prayer	Jack Foley	Unseated rider
2	Darasso	Luke Dempsey	Unseated rider
2	Fury Road	Jonjo O'Neill Jr	Unseated rider
2	The Big Breakaway	Brendan Powell	Fell
8 (Canal Turn)	Longhouse Poet	JJ Slevin	Unseated rider
9 (Valentine's Brook)	Lifetime Ambition	Sean O'Keefe	Brought down
13	Cape Gentleman	Jody McGarvey	Pulled up
15 (The Chair)	Gabby's Cross	Peter Carvery	Fell
15 (The Chair)	Sam Brown	Johnny Burke	Fell
18	Any Second Now	Mark Walsh	Pulled up
18	Dunboyne	Jack Tudor	Pulled up
18	Velvet Elvis	Darragh O'Keeffe	Pulled up
21	Delta Work	Keith Donoghue	Unseated rider
21	Eva's Oscar	Alan Johns	Unseated rider
24 (Canal Turn)	Mr Incredible	Brian Hayes	Unseated rider
27	Back On The Lash	Adam Wedge	Pulled up
29	Coko Beach	Harry Cobden	Pulled up
30	Capodanno	Danny Mullins	Pulled up

== Broadcasting and media ==
"Corach Rambler soars into the lead in the National, Mister Coffey in second place, The Big Dog, Gaillard Du Mesnil, behind these Roi Mage, Born By The Sea, last year's winner Noble Yates, Vanillier, and Le Milos. They're heading towards the Elbow, they're all chasing Corach Rambler who is clear by a wide margin. The greys Vanillier and Gaillard Du Mesnil, with Noble Yates and The Big Dog are next. Getting lonely out in front, Corach Rambler just hanging, but surely has a big enough lead. It's six lengths to Vanillier and Gaillard Du Mesnil. Lucinda Russell, Derek Fox, and again Scotland take the National with Corach Rambler,"

— ITV lead commentator Richard Hoiles describes the climax of the race.

As the Grand National is accorded the status of an event of national interest in the United Kingdom and is listed on the Ofcom Code on Sports and Other Listed and Designated Events, it must be shown on free-to-air terrestrial television in the UK. The race was broadcast live on TV by ITV for the sixth time, and the final year in its current three year deal with the British Horseracing Authority.

The ITV coverage was presented by Ed Chamberlin and Adele Mulrennan. Analysis was provided by former jockeys Sir Anthony McCoy, Mick Fitzgerald, Tom Scudamore, Harry Cobden and Ruby Walsh. Reports were provided by Alice Plunkett, Luke Harvey, Rishi Persad and Matt Chapman, and betting updates were provided by Brian Gleeson. Oli Bell and Chris Hughes covered viewers' comments on social media, while Mark Heyes and Charlotte Hawkins were chatting to the crowd on Ladies Day. The commentary team was Mark Johnson, Stewart Machin and Richard Hoiles, who called the finish for the sixth time. Following the race, Bell and Walsh guided viewers on a fence-by-fence re-run of the race.

== Equine fatalities ==
Hill Sixteen fell and was mortally injured at the first fence, killing him almost instantly. The trainer of Hill Sixteen, Sandy Thomson, claimed that the horse became "hyper" because of the protests, which led to him not taking off at the first fence. Thomson was adamant that the actions of the protesters were behind his horse falling for the first time in his career. Hill Sixteen had previously run in 27 races on 15 different tracks, and had previously jumped the Grand National fences at Aintree while competing twice in the Becher Chase .

Earlier at the Aintree meeting Envoye Special had been euthanised, following an injury after a fall in the Foxhunters' Open Hunters' Chase and Dark Raven had been euthanised after a fall at the Turners Mersey Novice Hurdle.

== Protests ==
Animal rights campaign group Animal Rising had threatened to disrupt the race and were protesting from early on the day of the race. 118 people were arrested over protests that delayed the start of race by 14 minutes. Merseyside Police held nine people who had been able to enter the track and later said arrests had been made for both "criminal damage and public nuisance offences", including arrests made before the race and connected to a protest that had blocked the M57.

This was the third Grand National to be disrupted in post-war history since the 1993 Grand National which led to a series of false starts and the 1997 Grand National was postponed to Monday because of an IRA bomb threat.
