= Corach Rambler =

Thoroughbred racehorse

- Racing silks of The Ramblers
- Sire: Jeremy
- Grandsire: Danehill Dancer
- Dam: Heart N Hope
- Damsire: Fourstars Allstar
- Sex: Gelding
- Foaled: 10 April 2014
- Country: Ireland
- Colour: Bay
- Breeder: P Hillis
- Owner: The Ramblers
- Trainer: Lucinda Russell
- Record: 18: 7-0-3
- Earnings: £776,459

Major wins
- Ultima Handicap Chase (2022, 2023); Grand National (2023)

Corach Rambler (foaled 10 April 2014) is a former Irish-bred thoroughbred racehorse who competed in National Hunt racing and won the 2023 Grand National, as well as consecutive runnings of the Ultima Handicap at the Cheltenham Festival in 2022 and 2023. He was trained by Lucinda Russell at Kinross in Scotland and ridden in by Derek Fox in all his races under rules.

== Background and early career ==
Corach Rambler is a bay gelding with an irregular white blaze, bred at Wellingtonbridge in Ireland by Paul Hillis. His sire Jeremy has sired several prolific National Hunt horses, including Our Conor. His dam, Heart N Hope, raced four times in Irish bumpers without success. He was given the name Corach Rambler after a football team local to Hillis.

In 2019 and 2020 Corach Rambler had five starts in Irish point-to-points, trained by John Martin Walsh. He won on his final start between the flags at Monskgrange in September 2020. He was subsequently sold for £17,000 to trainer Russell at the Goffs November sales in the same year. Russell sold one share in the horse back to Paul Hillis and advertised a further six shares online, with the owners forming a syndicate called The Ramblers and paying around £3,000 a share each.

== Career under rules ==
Corach Rambler made his debut under rules in a three-mile novices' hurdle at Ayr on 18 January 2021, staying on dourly in the heavy ground to win by three lengths.

He ran three times in novice hurdles, winning twice, with the second victory coming in a four-runner race at Carlisle, He was then switched to steeplechasing, making his chase debut at Perth in September 2021. He finished third behind Minella Trump – a horse he subsequently beat in his Grand National victory.

The following month, at Aintree on his second chase start, Corach Rambler gained his first victory over the larger obstacles, winning by six lengths despite racing with an awkward head-carriage. He followed up his victory at Aintree with a victory in a novice chase at Cheltenham at their International meeting in December 2021, beating Eva's Oskar by two lengths.

After a short break, Corach Rambler ran in the Classic Chase at Warwick, the course's most prestigious race of the season, finishing fourth, beaten almost twenty lengths by Eclair Surf. In February 2022, Corach Rambler was sent off favourite for the Reynoldstown Novices' Chase at Ascot. He failed to complete the race, unseating Derek Fox five fences from home. Attempting to amend his Ascot mishap, Corach Rambler ran in the Ultima Handicap Chase at the Cheltenham Festival. Held up in the rear for the majority of the race, he made headway on the home turn to win by almost three lengths, staying on well and going away again at the line. This victory was jockey Fox's first Cheltenham Festival winner.

Following a seven-month break, Corach Rambler made his seasonal reappearance in October 2022 at Carlisle, finishing fifth out of seven in the listed Colin Parker Memorial Chase. One month later, he ran in the Coral Gold Cup at Newbury, making good headway from the rear to finish a never-nearer fourth. After a break of almost four months, Corach Rambler returned to Cheltenham in an attempt to become one of the very few horses to win the Ultima Handicap Chase more than once. Sent off the favourite, he was again held up in the rear by Fox, making good headway between rivals on the home turn with his usual surge to the front. After hitting the front and looking likely to win comfortably, he idled in front and just held on to win by a head from the rallying Fastorslow. Fox's ride in this race won him the 2023 Lester Award for Jump Ride of the Year.

Following on from his second success in the Ultima, Corach Rambler was declared to run in the 2023 Grand National, where he was officially 10 pounds 'well-in' on handicap ratings for the race. Sent off the 8/1 favourite, Corach Rambler was ridden more prominently than usual, jumping boldly throughout. After taking the lead and surging clear at the last fence, he won by two-and-a-quarter lengths ahead of Vanillier after idling slightly on the run in. The victory was jockey Fox's and trainer Russell's second in the race, following on from their success with One For Arthur in 2017. Fox had injured a shoulder in a fall at Wetherby the week before the Grand National and was only declared fit to ride Corach Rambler the day before the race.

At the 2023 Cheltenham Festival, Corach Rambler came third behind Galopin Des Champs in the Gold Cup. He started as 15/2 third favourite in the 2024 Grand National, only to unseat Fox at the first fence. Running loose, he was then brought down at the second fence. His final race was in the Punchestown Gold Cup on 1 May 2024, where he was never going well and was pulled up. His trainer later said that his experience at Aintree may have frightened him: "We said all along that he is one of the most intelligent horses we have ever trained and he never looked happy when we ran him at Punchestown last month." He had never previously fallen or been brought down in a race.

It was decided to retire Corach Rambler two weeks after his Punchestown defeat. Russell said: "More than anything we want him to go out at the top, in excellent physical condition and able to hopefully enjoy a long and happy retirement."
