= Towton Novices' Chase =

Steeplechase horse race in Britain

Towton Novices' Chase
2023
City Chief	O'Toole	Bellatrixsa

Previous years
2022
Ahoy Senor	Noble Yeats	Ashtown Lad

2020-2011
2020
Newtide	Ardlethen	Dominateur
2018
Ballyoptic	Vintage Clouds	Shades Of Midnight
2017
Baywing	Calett Mad	Missed Approach
2016
Blaklion	Definitely Red	Native River
2015
Ned Stark	Kaki De La Pree	Straidnahanna
2014
Ely Brown	Milborough	Strike Fast
2013
Goulanes	Super Duty	Fentara
2011
Wayward Prince	Cape Tribulation	Captain Americo

2010-2001
2010
Weird Al	Knockara Beau	Mumbles Head
2009
Kornati Kid	Will Be Done	Companero
2007
Heltornic	Miko de Beauchene	Heez A Dreamer
2006
Halcon Genelardais	Preacher Boy	Mort De Rire
2005
Ollie Magern	King Harald	Undeniable
2004
Royal Emperor	Native Emperor	Silver Knight
2003
Keen Leader	Jungle Jinks	Haut Cercy

2000-1996
2000
Arctic Camper	Beau	Only two finished
1999
Kadou Nonantais	Scotton Green	Edmond
1998
Escartefigue	Radical Choice	Feels Like Gold
1996
Mr Mulligan	Call It A Day	Ubu Val

The Towton Novices' Chase is a Grade 2 National Hunt steeplechase in Great Britain which is open to horses aged five years or older. It is run at Wetherby over a distance of about 3 miles (3 miles and 45 yards, or 4,869 metres), and during its running there are nineteen fences to be jumped. The race is for novice chasers, and it is scheduled to take place each year in late January or early February.

The event is named after the village of Towton, which is located several miles to the south of Wetherby. It was first run in 1996, and the inaugural winner, Mr Mulligan, went on to win the following year's Cheltenham Gold Cup.

In April 2023 the British Horseracing Authority announced that the race would be moved to mid-January and run over a reduced distance of two and a half miles.

== Winners ==
Year	Winner	Age	Jockey	Trainer
1996	Mr Mulligan	8	Richard Johnson	Noel Chance
1997	Abandoned due to snow
1998	Escartefigue	6	Richard Johnson	David Nicholson
1999	Kadou Nonantais	6	Jamie Osborne	Oliver Sherwood
2000	Arctic Camper	8	Adrian Maguire	Venetia Williams
2001	Abandoned due to waterlogged state of course
2002	Abandoned due to waterlogged state of course
2003	Keen Leader	7	Liam Cooper	Jonjo O'Neill
2004	Royal Emperor	8	Dominic Elsworth	Sue Smith
2005	Ollie Magern	7	Carl Llewellyn	Nigel Twiston-Davies
2006	Halcon Genelardais	6	Wayne Hutchinson	Alan King
2007	Heltornic	7	Graham Lee	Michael Scudamore
2008	Abandoned due to frost
2009	Kornati Kid	7	Tom O'Brien	Philip Hobbs
2010	Weird Al	7	Paddy Brennan	Ian Williams
2011	Wayward Prince	7	Dougie Costello	Ian Williams
	no race 2012 (Note: The 2012 running was abandoned due to frost)
2013	Goulanes	7	Tom Scudamore	David Pipe
2014	Ely Brown	9	Noel Fehily	Charlie Longsdon
2015	Ned Stark	7	Denis O'Regan	Alan King
2016	Blaklion	7	Ryan Hatch	Nigel Twiston-Davies
2017	Baywing	8	Ryan Day	Nicky Richards
2018	Ballyoptic	9	Tom Bellamy	Nigel Twiston-Davies
	no race 2019 (Note: The 2019 running was abandoned due to frost)
2020	Newtide	7	David Bass	Kim Bailey
	no race 2021
2022	Ahoy Senor	7	Derek Fox	Lucinda Russell
2023	City Chief	6	James Bowen	Nicky Henderson
2024	Colonel Harry	7	Gavin Sheehan	Jamie Snowden
2025	Handstands	6	Ben Jones	Ben Pauling

== See also ==
- Horseracing in Great Britain
- List of British National Hunt races
