= 2017 Grand National =

English steeplechase horse race

- Grand National
- Location: Aintree Racecourse
- Date: 8 April 2017
- Winning horse: (Republic of Ireland) One For Arthur
- Starting price: 14/1
- Jockey: (Republic of Ireland) Derek Fox
- Trainer: (Scotland) Lucinda Russell
- Owner: Two Golf Widows
- Conditions: Good to soft

External videos
- Full replay of the 2017 Grand National Racing TV, YouTube

The 2017 Grand National (officially known as the 2017 Randox Health Grand National for sponsorship reasons) was the 170th official running of the Grand National horse race at Aintree Racecourse near Liverpool, England. The showpiece steeplechase over a distance of 4 miles 514 yards (6.907 km) took place on 8 April 2017, the final day of a three-day meeting. A maximum field of 40 runners competed for a share of a prize fund of £1 million.

Randox Health is the new sponsor of the main race and the festival itself for the next five years. It was broadcast live on television by ITV for the first time. There was live radio coverage by BBC Radio, which has held the radio rights since 1927, and by Talksport, which covered the main race live for the fourth time.

The race was won by One For Arthur, only the second horse trained in Scotland to win the Grand National (the other being Rubstic in 1979). One For Arthur was ridden by Derek Fox and trained by Lucinda Russell, and was sent off at odds of 14/1.

== Race card ==
A total of 110 entries were received for consideration in the 2017 Grand National and were announced on 1 February 2017. Among the early favourites were Don Poli, who won three Grade 1 races in the 2015–16 season, and 2016 National runner-up The Last Samuri. The 2015 winner, Many Clouds, who was also among the ante-post favourites, died of a pulmonary haemorrhage shortly before the entries were announced.

The weights were announced on 14 February and headed by Lexus Chase winner Outlander, however, trainer Gordon Elliott indicated that he would not run. The top five weighted horses were all Irish-trained, including three by Elliott. One runner (Otago Trail) was scratched before the weights were assigned. Ninety-five entries remained after the first scratching deadline on 28 February. Elliott, who had earlier expressed his dissatisfaction with the weights assigned to his horses, withdrew several of his entries, including Outlander, Empire of Dirt and Don Poli, leaving Carlingford Lough as the new top weight. Vieux Lion Rouge, who won the Grand National Trial at Haydock, was now the favourite with the bookmakers, at 12/1. The field was reduced to 79 following the second scratching deadline on 21 March. The five-day confirmation process began on 3 April with 70 horses advancing, following the withdrawal of top-weight Carlingford Lough. The final field was announced on 6 April, including four reserves in case of any withdrawals before 1 pm on 7 April. One of the top 40 horses going into the confirmation stage (Pendra) withdrew. There were no further withdrawals before the deadline, leaving the following 40 starters:

No	Horse	Age	Handicap (st–lb)	SP	Jockey	Trainer
1	The Last Samuri (IRE)	9	11-10	16/1	David Bass	Kim Bailey
2	More Of That (IRE)	9	11-06	16/1	Barry Geraghty	Jonjo O'Neill
3	Shantou Flyer (IRE)	7	11-05	50/1	Jonathan Moore	Rebecca Curtis
4	Perfect Candidate (IRE)	10	11-05	33/1	Paddy Brennan	Fergal O'Brien
5	Saphir Du Rheu (FR)	8	11-05	16/1	Sam Twiston-Davies	Paul Nicholls
6	Roi Des Francs (FR)	8	11-03	50/1	Jack Kennedy	Gordon Elliott (IRE)
7	Wounded Warrior (IRE)	8	11-02	33/1	Sean Flanagan	Noel Meade (IRE)
8	Wonderful Charm (FR)	9	11-02	28/1	Ms Katie Walsh	Paul Nicholls
9	Tenor Nivernais (FR)	10	11-01	40/1	Aidan Coleman	Venetia Williams
10	Blaklion	8	11-01	8/1 F	Noel Fehily	Nigel Twiston-Davies
11	Drop Out Joe	9	11-01	33/1	Tom O'Brien	Charlie Longsdon
12	Le Mercurey (FR)	7	11-00	50/1	Sean Bowen	Paul Nicholls
13	The Young Master	8	10–13	20/1	Mr Sam Waley-Cohen	Neil Mulholland
14	Cause of Causes (USA)	9	10–13	16/1	Mr Jamie Codd	Gordon Elliott (IRE)
15	Regal Encore (IRE)	9	10–13	33/1	Robbie Power	Anthony Honeyball
16	Vieux Lion Rouge (FR)	8	10–12	12/1	Tom Scudamore	David Pipe
17	Definitly Red (IRE)	8	10–12	10/1	Danny Cook	Brian Ellison
18	Ucello Conti (FR)	9	10–12	20/1	Daryl Jacob	Gordon Elliott (IRE)
19	Double Shuffle (IRE)	7	10–12	33/1	Adrian Heskin	Tom George
20	Houblon Des Obeaux (FR)	10	10–12	50/1	Charlie Deutsch	Venetia Williams
21	Pleasant Company (IRE)	9	10–12	11/1	Ruby Walsh	Willie Mullins (IRE)
22	One For Arthur (IRE)	8	10–11	14/1	Derek Fox	Lucinda Russell
23	Ballynagour (IRE)	11	10–11	66/1	David Noonan	David Pipe
24	O'Faolains Boy (IRE)	10	10–11	50/1	Paul Townend	Rebecca Curtis
25	Highland Lodge (IRE)	11	10–11	25/1	Henry Brooke	James Moffatt
26	Bishops Road (IRE)	9	10-10	66/1	Jamie Moore	Kerry Lee
27	Lord Windermere (IRE)	11	10-10	33/1	Leighton Aspell	Jim Culloty (IRE)
28	Saint Are (FR)	11	10-10	25/1	Davy Russell	Tom George
29	Vicente (FR)	8	10-10	16/1	Brian Hughes	Paul Nicholls
30	Just A Par (IRE)	10	10-09	33/1	Harry Cobden	Paul Nicholls
31	Measureofmydreams (IRE)	9	10-09	40/1	Donagh Meyler	Noel Meade (IRE)
32	Raz de Maree (FR)	12	10-09	33/1	Ger Fox	Gavin Cromwell (IRE)
33	Stellar Notion (IRE)	9	10-09	50/1	David Mullins	Henry de Bromhead (IRE)
34	Rogue Angel (IRE)	9	10-08	20/1	Bryan Cooper	Mouse Morris (IRE)
35	Cocktails At Dawn	9	10-08	33/1	Nico de Boinville	Nicky Henderson
36	Thunder And Roses (IRE)	9	10-07	25/1	Mark Enright	Mouse Morris (IRE)
37	Gas Line Boy (IRE)	11	10-07	50/1	Robert Dunne	Ian Williams
38	Goodtoknow	9	10-07	66/1	Jake Greenall	Kerry Lee
39	La Vaticane (FR)	8	10-06	80/1	Richie McLernon	David Pipe
40	Doctor Harper (IRE)	9	10-06	50/1	Connor O'Farrell	David Pipe

- Great Britain unless stated.
- Amateur jockeys denoted by preceding title, e.g. Mr.
- Liam Treadwell was due to ride Tenor Nivernais but was replaced by Coleman after getting injured.

== Race overview ==
Two false starts occurred before the race could get underway, the first caused by several horses running off too keenly and the second by The Young Master and Raz de Maree jumping the gun from a standing start. When the race eventually began properly, the 50/1 outsider Roi Des Francs led the field on the first circuit with Rogue Angel and Highland Lodge also prominent. The 10/1 second-favourite Definitly Red was pulled up at Valentine's, whilst Saphir Du Rheu fell at the 11th.

As the horses rounded the turn to begin the second circuit, Roi Des Francs was carried out by a loose horse and rejoined the field in mid-division, leaving Rogue Angel as the new leader. Saint Are, Blaklion and Vieux Lion Rouge remained close behind the leaders. With five fences remaining, the 8/1 favourite Blaklion moved up to challenge Rogue Angel for the lead, with Saint Are going third and Cause of Causes coming into contention. With two fences left to jump, Blaklion raced into a three-length lead over Rogue Angel, as Vieux Lion Rouge advanced into third and One For Arthur made significant progress through the field.

At the second-last, One For Arthur jumped into the back of the leader Blaklion, with Cause of Causes and Gas Line Boy moving up to contest first place. The four were all stride for stride as they took the last fence, but One For Arthur jumped into the lead and accelerated to go three lengths clear at the elbow, increasing that advantage in the final furlong as he crossed the finish line 4 1/2 lengths ahead of Cause of Causes in second, with 3 1/2 lengths back to Saint Are, who ran on well to clinch third by half a length from Blaklion.

There were no fatalities and all 40 runners returned safely to the stables.

== Finishing order ==
Placed horses

1: One For Arthur

2: Cause Of Causes

3: Saint Are

4: Blaklion

The 19 horses to complete the course finished as follows:

Position	Horse	Jockey	SP	Distance	Prize money
1	One For Arthur	Derek Fox	14/1	4 1/2 lengths	£561,300
2	Cause of Causes	Mr Jamie Codd	16/1	3 3/4 lengths	£211,100
3	Saint Are	Davy Russell	25/1	1/2 length	£105,500
4	Blaklion	Noel Fehily	8/1 F	8 lengths	£52,700
5	Gas Line Boy	Robert Dunne	50/1	10 lengths	£26,500
6	Vieux Lion Rouge	Tom Scudamore	12/1	1 length	£13,200
7	Lord Windermere	Leighton Aspell	33/1	Neck	£6,800
8	Regal Encore	Robbie Power	33/1	Head	£3,600
9	Pleasant Company	Ruby Walsh	11/1	14 lengths	£2,000
10	Houblon Des Obeaux	Charlie Deutsch	50/1	2 3/4 lengths	£1,000
11	Ballynagour	David Noonan	66/1	1 1/4 lengths	
12	Le Mercurey	Sean Bowen	50/1	3 1/2 lengths	
13	Goodtoknow	Jake Greenall	66/1	3 1/2 lengths	
14	Just A Par	Harry Cobden	33/1	6 lengths	
15	La Vaticane	Richie McLernon	80/1	7 lengths	
16	The Last Samuri	David Bass	16/1	6 lengths	
17	Tenor Nivernais	Aidan Coleman	40/1	7 lengths	
18	Roi Des Francs	Jack Kennedy	50/1	1 length	
19	Wonderful Charm	Katie Walsh	28/1	Last to complete	

- Distance measures from smallest to largest winning margin: nose, short head, head, short neck, neck, one length, a distance.

== Non-finishers ==
The runners who failed to complete were as follows:

Fence	Horse	Jockey	SP	Fate
1st	Cocktails At Dawn	Nico de Boinville	33/1	Fell
1st	Vicente	Brian Hughes	16/1	Fell
6th (Becher's Brook)	The Young Master	Mr Sam Waley-Cohen	20/1	Fell
6th (Becher's Brook)	Raz De Maree	Ger Fox	33/1	Unseated rider
9th (Valentine's)	Definitly Red	Danny Cook	10/1	Pulled up
9th (Valentine's)	Thunder And Roses	Mark Enright	25/1	Unseated rider
11th	Saphir Du Rheu	Sam Twiston-Davies	16/1	Unseated rider
13th	Stellar Notion	David Mullins	50/1	Pulled up
15th (The Chair)	Measureofmydreams	Donagh Meyler	40/1	Unseated rider
22nd (Becher's Brook)	Ucello Conti	Daryl Jacob	20/1	Unseated rider
26th	Perfect Candidate	Paddy Brennan	33/1	Pulled up
26th	Shantou Flyer	Jonathan Moore	50/1	Pulled up
29th	Wounded Warrior	Sean Flanagan	33/1	Pulled up
29th	Double Shuffle	Adrian Heskin	33/1	Pulled up
29th	Doctor Harper	Connor O'Farrell	50/1	Pulled up
30th	Highland Lodge	Henry Brooke	25/1	Pulled up
30th	Rogue Angel	Bryan Cooper	20/1	Pulled up
30th	O'Faolains Boy	Paul Townend	50/1	Pulled up
30th	Drop Out Joe	Tom O'Brien	33/1	Pulled up
30th	More Of That	Barry Geraghty	16/1	Pulled up
30th	Bishops Road	Jamie Moore	66/1	Pulled up

== Broadcasting and media ==
As they head down towards the last, One for Arthur for Scotland, Blaklion, Cause of Causes and Wonderful Charm on the inside, they are four deep heading to the last! And it's One for Arthur who accelerates, and moves to the lead from Cause of Causes, as they head up this long run in. One for Arthur is out in front, Cause of Causes in second place for Jamie Codd, Blaklion now back in third as they head towards the elbow in the National. And it's One for Arthur, out in front for Derek Fox and Lucinda Russell, beginning to pull three lengths clear from Cause of Causes, back in third is Blaklion, Saint Are is running on late in the day but it's One for Arthur, who crept into the race for the first circuit and a half, and is keeping up the gallop towards the line! And Scottish flags are flying high! One for Arthur won it!

— ITV lead commentator Richard Hoiles describes the climax of the race.

As the Grand National is accorded the status of an event of national interest in the United Kingdom and is listed on the Ofcom Code on Sports and Other Listed and Designated Events, it must be shown on free-to-air terrestrial television in the UK. The race was broadcast live on TV by ITV. This was the first year that ITV broadcast the race live, following the decision by Channel 4 to drop the event and horse racing in general in 2016.

The coverage was led by Ed Chamberlin. Retired champion jockey Sir Anthony McCoy and Mick Fitzgerald provided expert opinions throughout the coverage, with reports from Brough Scott, Luke Harvey, Oli Bell and Alice Plunkett and betting updates by Matt Chapman. The commentary team was Mark Johnson, Ian Bartlett and Richard Hoiles, who called the winner home for the first time in his terrestrial television commentary career.

== See also ==
- Horse racing in Great Britain
- List of British National Hunt races
