= One For Arthur =

Irish-bred Thoroughbred racehorse

- Racing silks of Two Golf Widows
- Sire: Milan
- Grandsire: Sadler's Wells
- Dam: Nonnetia
- Damsire: Trempolino
- Sex: Gelding
- Foaled: 24 February 2009
- Died: 24 March 2023 (aged 14)
- Country: Ireland
- Colour: Bay
- Breeder: J P Dwan
- Owner: Deborah Thomson; Belinda McClung
- Trainer: Lucinda Russell
- Record: 19: 7-3-5
- Earnings: £638,938

Major wins
- Classic Chase (2017); Grand National (2017)

One For Arthur (24 February 2009 – 24 March 2023) was an Irish-bred Thoroughbred racehorse who competed in National Hunt racing. In 2017 he became the second horse trained in Scotland to win the Grand National.

== Background ==
One For Arthur was a bay gelding with a white blaze bred in Ireland by J P Dwan. He was sold as a yearling for €14,000 and made €34,000 when returning to the sales ring as a three-year-old. In December 2014, he was again put up for auction at the Brightwells Cheltenham sale and was bought for £60,000 by the trainer Lucinda Russell. He entered the ownership of Deborah Thomson and Belinda McClung who formed the Two Golf Widows partnership after their respective partners took to spending most of their weekends on the golf course. He was trained throughout his professional racing career at Arlary near Kinross in Scotland by Russell, assisted by her partner Peter Scudamore.

He was sired by Milan, who won the St Leger and finished second in the Breeders' Cup Turf in 2001. Milan's other progeny include Jezki, and Darlan. His dam Nonnetia, who won one race over hurdles in France, was a granddaughter of Wavy Reef, the female-line ancestor of the Irish St. Leger winner Duncan.

== Racing career ==
=== 2013/2014 National Hunt season ===
One For Arthur began his racing career on the amateur point-to-point circuit and was beaten in his first four races before winning at the Lingstown meeting in November 2013. When moved up to compete against professional competition following his move to Russell's yard in early 2014 he finished second in a National Hunt Flat race at Newcastle Racecourse in February and a Novice Hurdle at Kelso in March.

=== 2014/2015 National Hunt season ===
As he had failed to win under professional rules, One For Arthur was campaigned in novice hurdles in the 2014/2015 season. He finished third in his first two starts but then recorded his first win under rules at Haydock Park in January and followed up with a fifteen length win at Ayr Racecourse on 10 February. He won again at Ayr in March but when stepped up in class for the Sefton Novices' Hurdle at Aintree Racecourse in April he started a 40/1 outsider and was pulled up in a race won by Thistlecrack.

=== 2015/2016 National Hunt season ===
In the 2015/2016 season, One For Arthur was campaigned in novice steeplechases and made a successful debut over the larger obstacles when winning at Kelso in October. He failed to win again in six subsequent races that season, but ran consistently, finishing second once and third on three occasions,

=== 2016/2017 National Hunt season ===
On his first appearance of the 2016/2017 National Hunt season, One For Arthur started 5/2 favourite for a handicap at Kelso in October and won by six lengths after taking the lead at the penultimate fence. In December he was tried over the Grand National course at Aintree and finished fifth of the 22 runners behind Vieux Lion Rouge in the Becher Chase. In the Classic Chase at Warwick Racecourse on 4 January, One For Arthur was assigned a weight of 151 pounds and started at odds of 14/1 in a field of 20 chasers. He took the lead at the second last fence and drew away to win by six lengths from Goodtoknow.

One For Arthur was assigned a weight of 10-11 (151 pounds) for the Randox Health Grand National over four and a quarter miles at Aintree and started at odds of 14/1 in a forty-runner field. He was ridden by Derek Fox who had just returned from injury having sustained a broken wrist and a dislocated collarbone in a fall on 9 March. One For Arthur raced towards the rear of the field before beginning to make progress early on the second circuit. He moved into contention three fences out, at which point the favourite Blaklion had opened up a clear advantage. One For Arthur overtook the favourite approaching the final obstacle and stayed on up the run-in to win by four and a half lengths from Cause of Causes, with Saint Are taking third ahead of Blaklion. He became the second horse trained in Scotland to win the race, following Rubstic's victory in 1979. After the race, Fox said "It's the best feeling I've ever had. He's just such a brave horse. It's a sign of a true racehorse to win the Grand National. It's unbelievable... I don't often get a chance to ride a horse as good as that". Russell commented "I am so proud of the horse. He jumped fantastically and Derek gave him a great ride. He has done us proud, done Scotland proud and done everyone at the yard proud".

=== 2018/2019 National Hunt season ===
After his Grand National victory, One for Arthur had a break of twenty months, returning to the racecourse in December 2018 for the Many Clouds Chase at Aintree in which he unseated his rider. His next race was the Peter Marsh Chase at Haydock Park in which he again unseated his rider. He then came sixth in the 2019 Grand National, finishing twenty-five and a quarter lengths behind Tiger Roll.

=== 2019/2020 National Hunt season and retirement ===
One for Arthur raced three times in the season, coming fourth in a handicap chase at Kelso, fifth in the Becher Chase at Aintree and being pulled up in Grand National Trial handicap chase at Haydock Park. He was set to run in the 2020 Grand National, but the race was cancelled due to the COVID-19 pandemic. His retirement was announced in November 2020. He spent some time with his breeder in Ireland and was entered in the show ring at the Dublin Horse Show before returning to Scotland and taking part in hunting and cross-country with his former work-rider Ailsa McClung. He died from colic aged fourteen on 24 March 2023.

== Pedigree ==
Pedigree of One For Arthur (IRE), bay gelding, 2009
Sire Milan (IRE) 1998	Sadler's Wells (USA); 1981	Northern Dancer	Nearctic
Sire Milan (IRE) 1998	Sadler's Wells (USA); 1981	Northern Dancer	Natalma
Sire Milan (IRE) 1998	Sadler's Wells (USA); 1981	Fairy Bridge	Bold Reason
Sire Milan (IRE) 1998	Sadler's Wells (USA); 1981	Fairy Bridge	Special
Sire Milan (IRE) 1998	Kithanga (IRE); 1990	Darshaan	Shirley Heights
Sire Milan (IRE) 1998	Kithanga (IRE); 1990	Darshaan	Delsy
Sire Milan (IRE) 1998	Kithanga (IRE); 1990	Kalata	Assert
Sire Milan (IRE) 1998	Kithanga (IRE); 1990	Kalata	Kalkeen
Dam Nonnetia (FR) 2003	Trempolino (USA); 1984	Sharpen Up	Atan
Dam Nonnetia (FR) 2003	Trempolino (USA); 1984	Sharpen Up	Rocchetta
Dam Nonnetia (FR) 2003	Trempolino (USA); 1984	Trephine	Viceregal
Dam Nonnetia (FR) 2003	Trempolino (USA); 1984	Trephine	Quiriquina
Dam Nonnetia (FR) 2003	Wavy Kris (IRE); 1993	Persian Bold	Bold Lad (IRE)
Dam Nonnetia (FR) 2003	Wavy Kris (IRE); 1993	Persian Bold	Relkarunner
Dam Nonnetia (FR) 2003	Wavy Kris (IRE); 1993	Wavy Reef	Kris
Dam Nonnetia (FR) 2003	Wavy Kris (IRE); 1993	Wavy Reef	Triple Reef (Family 1-n)
