= 1911 Handicap Chase =

Steeplechase horse race in Britain

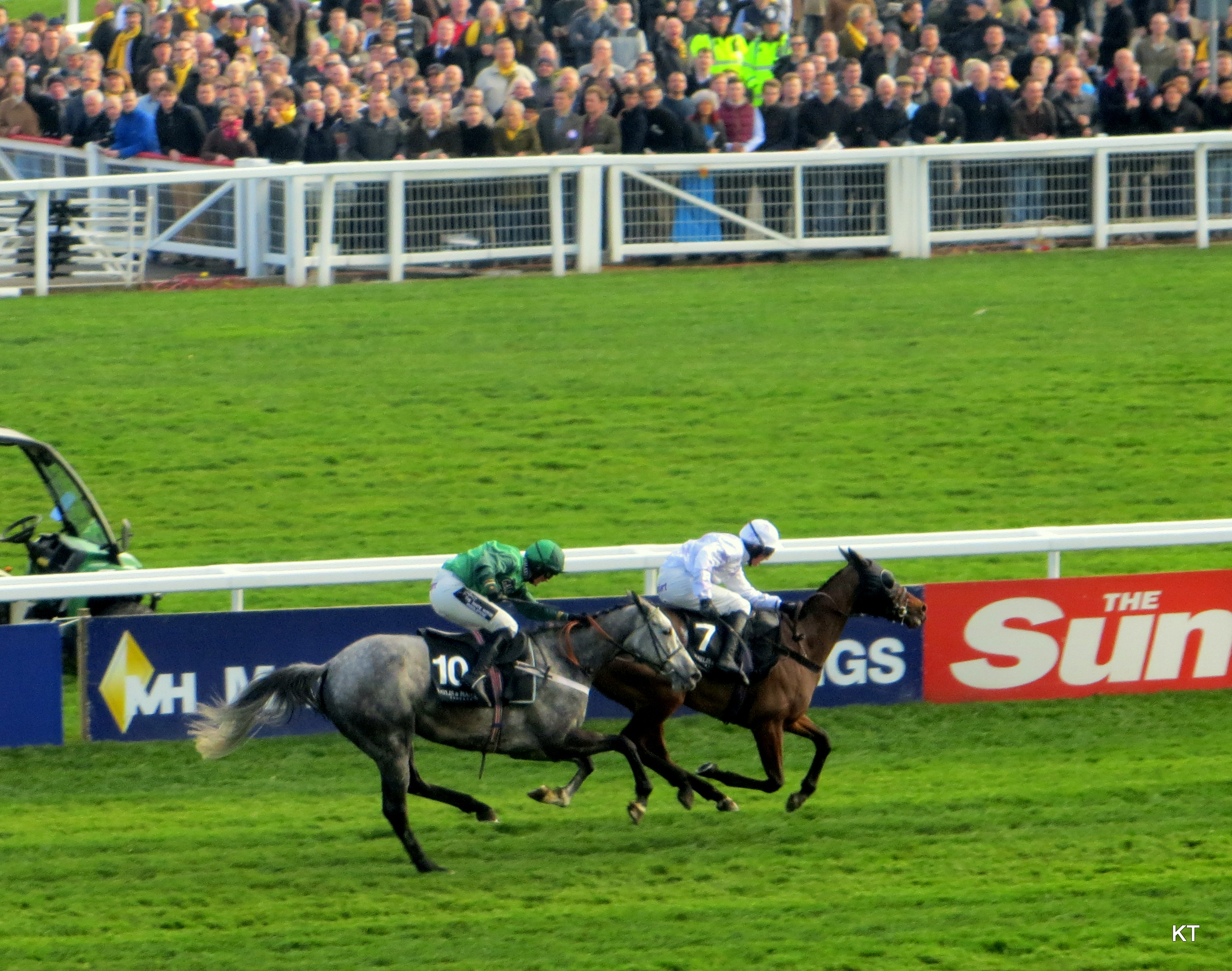
- Holywell beating Ma Filleule to win the 2014 running
- Class: Premier Handicap
- Location: Cheltenham Racecourse; Cheltenham, England
- Race type: Steeplechase
- Sponsor: Ultima Business Solutions
- Website: Cheltenham

Race information
- Distance: 3m 1f (5,029 metres)
- Surface: Turf
- Track: Left-handed
- Qualification: Five-years-old and up
- Weight: Handicap
- Purse: £150,000 (2025); 1st: £84,405

1911 Handicap Chase
2026
Johnnywho	Jagwar	Quebecois

Previous years
2025
Myretown	The Changing Man	Malina Girl
2024
Chianti Classico	Twig	Meetingofthewaters
2023
Corach Rambler	Fastorslow	Monbeg Genius
2022
Corach Rambler	Gericault Roque	Oscar Elite
2021
Vintage Clouds	Happygolucky	Aye Right

2020-2011
2020
The Conditional	Kildisart	Discorama
2019
Beware The Bear	Vintage Clouds	Lake View Lad
2018
Coo Star Sivola	Shantou Flyer	Vintage Clouds
2017
Un Temps Pour Tout	Singlefarmpayment	Noble Endeavor
2016
Un Temps Pour Tout	Holywell	The Young Master
2015
The Druids Nephew	Grand Jesture	Gallant Oscar
2014
Holywell	Ma Filleule	The Package
2013
Golden Chieftain	Our Mick	White Star Line
2012
Alfie Sherrin	Fruity O'Rooney	Our Mick
2011
Bensalem	Carole's Legacy	Reve De Sivola

2010-2001
2010
Chief Dan George	The Package	Ogee
2009
Wichita Lineman	Maljimar	Nenuphar Collonges
2008
An Accordion	New Alco	L'ami
2007
Joes Edge	Juveigneur	Distant Thunder
2006
Dun Doire	Juveigneur	Irish Hussar
2005
Kelami	Keen Leader	Irish Hussar
2004
Fork Lightning	Shardam	Royal Auclair
2003
Youlneverwalkalone	Haut Cercy	Ad Hoc
2002
Frenchman's Creek	Carbury Cross	Ad Hoc

2000-1991
2000
Marlborough	Beau	Star Traveller
1999
Betty's Boy	Island Chief	Nahthen Lad
1998
Unguided Missile	Glitter Isle	Even Flow
1997
Flyer's Nap	Stormtracker	General Command
1996
Maamur	Unguided Missile	Chatam
1995
Rough Quest	Antonin	Cache Fleur
1994
Antonin	Flash The Cash	Grange Brake
1993
Givus A Buck	Country Member	Boraceva
1992
Tipping Tim	Henry Mann	Gambling Royal
1991
Seagram	Cahervillahow	Outside Edge

1990-1988
1990
Bigsun	Seagram	Boraceva
1989
Dixton House	Gala's Image	Golden Friend
1988
Aquilifer	Bucko	Von Trappe

The 1911 Handicap Chase (often known for sponsorship reasons as the Ultima Handicap Chase) is a Premier Handicap National Hunt steeplechase in Great Britain which is open to horses aged five years or older. It is run on the Old Course at Cheltenham over a distance of about 3 miles and 1 furlong (5,029 metres), and during its running there are twenty fences to be jumped. It is a handicap race, and it is scheduled to take place each year on the opening day of the Cheltenham Festival in March.

The event was originally known as the National Hunt Handicap Chase, but its title has included the name of a sponsor from the early 1980s. It was backed by Ritz Club from 1981 until 1996, Astec Buzz Shop in 1997 and William Hill between 1998 and 2010. In 2011 the race was run as the Stewart Family Spinal Research Handicap Chase and sponsored by the Stewart family, headed by businessman and racehorse owner Andy Stewart to raise awareness of, and highlight the work done by, the charity Spinal Research. In 2012 and 2013 the race was sponsored by JLT Specialty Ltd, and in 2014 Baylis & Harding were the sponsors. Since 2015 the race has been sponsored by Ultima Business Solutions, and the race is often referred to as the Ultima Handicap Chase. It held Grade 3 status until 2022 and was re-classified as a Premier Handicap from the 2023 running when Grade 3 status was renamed by the British Horseracing Authority. The race gained the registered title of the 1911 Handicap Chase in 2026, honouring the year of the first Cheltenham Festival.

Winners of the race often take part in the Grand National, although not always in the same year. Horses to have achieved victory in both events include Royal Tan, Team Spirit, West Tip, Seagram, Rough Quest and Corach Rambler.

== Records ==
Most successful horse since 1946 (2 wins):

- Sentina – 1957, 1958
- Scot Lane – 1982, 1983
- Un Temps Pour Tout – 2016, 2017
- Corach Rambler- 2022, 2023

Leading jockey since 1946 (3 wins):

- Robert Thornton – Fork Lightning (2004), Kelami (2005), Bensalem (2011)
- Tom Scudamore – An Accordion (2008), Un Temps Pour Tout (2016, 2017)
- Richie McLernon - Alfie Sherrin (2012), Holywell (2014), Johnnywho (2026)

Leading trainer since 1946 (4 wins):

- Fred Rimell – Cavaliero (1948), Frere Jacques II (1949), Land Fort (1951), Holly Bank (1954)
- Fulke Walwyn – Ravencroft (1961), Team Spirit (1963), Lord Jim (1971), Gay Vulgan (1977)
- Jonjo O'Neill - Wichita Lineman (2009), Alfie Sherrin (2012), Holywell (2014), Johnnywho (2026)

== Winners since 1946 ==
- Weights given in stones and pounds.

Year	Winner	Age	Weight	Jockey	Trainer
1946	Dunnshaughlin	8	10-10	Bobby O'Ryan	Charles Rogers
	no race 1947 (Note: The 1947 running was abandoned due to snow and frost)
1948	Cavaliero	7	11-10	Ted Vinall	Fred Rimell
1949	Frere Jacques II	7	10-06	Ted Vinall	Fred Rimell
1950	Silver Fame	11	12-07	Martin Molony	George Beeby
1951	Land Fort	7	11-08	Johnny Bullock	Fred Rimell
1952	Royal Tan	8	11-06	Phonsie O'Brien (Note: amateur jockey)	Vincent O'Brien
1953	Four Ten	7	10-07	Tommy Cusack	John Roberts
1954	Holly Bank	7	10–13	Peter Brookshaw	Fred Rimell
1955	Limber Hill	8	11-02	Tim Molony	Bill Dutton
1956	Kerstin	6	10-05	George Milburn	Verly Bewicke
1957	Sentina	7	10-04	Pat Taaffe	Tom Dreaper
1958	Sentina	8	11-07	Tom Taaffe	Tom Dreaper
1959	Winning Coin	7	11-07	Dave Dick	George Beeby
1960	Isle of Skye	9	10-05	Tony Keen	Alec Kilpatrick
1961	Ravencroft	8	10-03	Fred Winter	Fulke Walwyn
1962	Longtail	7	11-00	Stan Mellor	Dick Curran
1963	Team Spirit	11	11-04	Willie Robinson	Fulke Walwyn
1964	Prudent Barney	10	10–11	Terry Biddlecombe	Bobby Renton
1965	Rondetto	9	11-10	Johnny Haine	Bob Turnell
1966	Arkloin	7	12-05	Pat Taaffe	Tom Dreaper
1967	Different Class	7	11–13	David Mould	Peter Cazalet
1968	Battledore	7	10-10	Kit Stobbs	Arthur Stephenson
1969	Chancer	7	11-00	Pat McCarron	Charlie Hall
1970	Charter Flight	8	11-09	Andrew Turnell	Bob Turnell
1971	Lord Jim	10	10-08	Johnny Haine	Fulke Walwyn
1972	Jomon	6	10–12	David Mould	Harry Thomson Jones
1973	The Chisler	7	10-10	Michael Dickinson	Tony Dickinson
1974	Cuckolder	9	10–13	Andrew Turnell	Bob Turnell
1975	King Flame	9	10-06	John Francome	Richard Head
1976	Barmer	8	10-03	Jimmy McNaught	Robin Blakeney
1977	Gay Vulgan	9	11-04	Bill Smith	Fulke Walwyn
	no race 1978 (Note: The 1978 edition was cancelled because of snow)
1979	Fair View	9	10-04	Ridley Lamb	George Fairbairn
1980	Again the Same	7	11-01	Jim Wilson	John Edwards
1981	Current Gold	10	10-07	Neale Doughty	Gordon W. Richards
1982	Scot Lane	9	10–12	Craig Smith	Martin Tate
1983	Scot Lane	10	11-07	Craig Smith	Martin Tate
1984	Tracys Special	7	11-01	Steve Knight	Andrew Turnell
1985	West Tip	8	10–13	Richard Dunwoody	Michael Oliver
1986	Charter Party	8	10-10	Peter Scudamore	David Nicholson
1987	Gainsay	8	10-05	Ben de Haan	Jenny Pitman
1988	Aquilifer	8	10–12	Paul Croucher	David Murray Smith
1989	Dixton House	10	11-00	Tom Morgan	John Edwards
1990	Bigsun	9	10–11	Richard Dunwoody	David Nicholson
1991	Seagram	11	10–11	Nigel Hawke	David Barons
1992	Tipping Tim	7	10-00	Carl Llewellyn	Nigel Twiston-Davies
1993	Givus a Buck	10	10-08	Paul Holley	David Elsworth
1994	Antonin	6	11-05	John Burke	Sue Bramall
1995	Rough Quest	9	10-03	Mick Fitzgerald	Terry Casey
1996	Maamur	8	10-00	Andrew Thornton	Tim Forster
1997	Flyer's Nap	11	11-02	David Bridgwater	Robert Alner
1998	Unguided Missile	10	11-10	Paul Carberry	Gordon W. Richards
1999	Betty's Boy	10	10-02	Norman Williamson	Kim Bailey
2000	Marlborough	8	10-03	Mick Fitzgerald	Nicky Henderson
	no race 2001 (Note: It was abandoned in 2001 because of a foot-and-mouth crisis)
2002	Frenchman's Creek	8	10-05	Paul Carberry	Hughie Morrison
2003	Youlneverwalkalone	9	10–11	Barry Geraghty	Christy Roche
2004	Fork Lightning	8	10–05	Robert Thornton	Alan King
2005	Kelami	7	10-02	Robert Thornton	François Doumen
2006	Dun Doire	7	10-09	Ruby Walsh	Tony Martin
2007	Joes Edge	10	10-06	Davy Russell	Ferdy Murphy
2008	An Accordion	7	10–12	Tom Scudamore	David Pipe
2009	Wichita Lineman	8	10-09	Tony McCoy	Jonjo O'Neill
2010	Chief Dan George	10	10-10	Paddy Aspell	James Moffatt
2011	Bensalem	8	11-02	Robert Thornton	Alan King
2012	Alfie Sherrin	9	10-00	Richie McLernon	Jonjo O'Neill
2013	Golden Chieftain	8	10-05	Brendan Powell Jnr	Colin Tizzard
2014	Holywell	7	11-06	Richie McLernon	Jonjo O'Neill
2015	The Druids Nephew	8	11-03	Barry Geraghty	Neil Mulholland
2016	Un Temps Pour Tout	7	11-07	Tom Scudamore	David Pipe
2017	Un Temps Pour Tout	8	11–12	Tom Scudamore	David Pipe
2018	Coo Star Sivola	6	10-10	Lizzie Kelly	Nick Williams
2019	Beware The Bear	9	11-08	Jeremiah McGrath	Nicky Henderson
2020	The Conditional	8	10-06	Brendan Powell Jnr	David Bridgwater
2021	Vintage Clouds	11	10-11	Ryan Mania	Sue Smith
2022	Corach Rambler	8	10-02	Derek Fox	Lucinda Russell
2023	Corach Rambler	9	11-05	Derek Fox	Lucinda Russell
2024	Chianti Classico	7	11-04	David Bass	Kim Bailey
2025	Myretown	8	10-03	Patrick Wadge	Lucinda Russell
2026	Johnnywho	9	11-03	Richie McLernon	Jonjo & AJ O'Neill

== See also ==
- Horse racing in Great Britain
- List of British National Hunt races
