= Peter FitzGerald (businessman) =

Northern Irish biochemist and businessman

Peter FitzGerald CBE
- Born: 1950 (age 75–76); Belfast, Northern Ireland
- Education: University of Strathclyde; National Institute for Medical Research
- Occupations: Biochemist; Asset Manager
- Known for: Founder and owner, Randox Health
- Spouse: Nuailin FitzGerald
- Children: 2

Peter FitzGerald CBE (born 1950) is a Northern Irish biochemist and businessman, and the founder and owner of Randox Health.

== Early life ==
FitzGerald was born in Belfast, and his parents moved to Crumlin.

He was educated at Wallace High School, Lisburn, followed by a degree in biochemistry from the University of Strathclyde, and a PhD from the National Institute for Medical Research in London.

FitzGerald was a junior fellow at Queen's University Belfast, before leaving to start his own company.

== Career ==
FitzGerald started Randox in 1982, aged 32, from a small lab in a chicken house in Randox Road, Crumlin, County Antrim, at the rear of his parents' farm.

In 2017, The Sunday Times Rich List estimated his net worth at £255 million, and in 2020 at £215 million.

He was appointed a Commander of the Order of the British Empire (CBE) in the 2011 New Year Honours for services to business in Northern Ireland.

== Personal life ==
FitzGerald is married to Nuailin, which he has called his "best business decision". In 2016, they had two children, Peter (aged 18) and Angharad (16). He is "a keen polo player", and Randox hosts an annual polo tournament in Errol, Perthshire, Scotland. Randox Health began sponsoring the Grand National in 2016, and in January 2021 the initial arrangement was extended to 2026. Fitzgerald stated how much he enjoyed working with the Jockey Club's team at Aintree and that he was looking forward to five more years of involvement. In 2020, he said that he had no plans to retire.
