= Classic Chase =

Steeplechase horse race in Britain

Classic Chase
2024
My Silver Lining	Galia Des Liteaux	Guetapan Collonges

Previous years
2023
Iwilldoit	Mr Incredible	Notachance
2022
Eclair Surf	Gericault Roque	Chirico Vallis
2021
Notachance	Achille	Le Breuil

2020-2011
2020
Kimberlite Candy	Captain Chaos	Petite Power
2019
Impulsive Star	Calett Mad	Crosspark
2018
Milansbar	Cogry	Missed Approach
2017
One For Arthur	Goodtoknow	Shotgun Paddy
2016
Russe Blanc	Midnight Prayer	Dromnea
2015
Hawkes Point	Theatrical Star	Shotgun Paddy
2014
Shotgun Paddy	Carruthers	Royale Knight
2013
Rigadin De Beauchene	Godsmejudge	Pete The Feat
2012
Hey Big Spender	Fredo	Strongbows Legend
2011
West End Rocker	Minella Boys	Incentivise

2010-2001
2008
D'Argent	Philson Run	Naunton Brook
2007
Ladalko	Mon Mome	Naunton Brook
2006
Eurotrek	Sir Rembrandt	Control Man
2005
Baron Windrush	D'Argent	Double Honour
2004
Southern Star	Jurancon II	What Odds
2002
Choisty	In The Rough	Zaggy Lane
2001
Saxon Duke	Parahandy	Dook's Delight

2000-1991
2000
Choisty	Golden Drum	Forest Ivory
1998
A N C Express	Martell Boy	Ceridwen
1996
Full Of Oats	Maamur	Gold Cap
1995
Willsford	Vicompt De Valmont	Judges Fancy
1994
Moorcroft Boy	Chatam	Into The Red
1993
Fiddlers Pike	Into The Red	Bonanza Boy
1992
Woodgate	Cool Ground	David's Duky
1991
Aquilifer	Ace Of Spies	Last House

1990-1989
1990
Midnight Madness	Mister Christian	Forest Ranger
1989
Memberson	Cool Ground	Red Columbia

The Classic Chase is a Premier Handicap National Hunt steeplechase in Great Britain which is open to horses aged five years or older. It is run at Warwick over a distance of about 3 miles and 5 furlongs (3 miles 5 furlongs and 54 yards, or 5,883 metres), and during its running there are twenty-two fences to be jumped. It is a handicap race, and it is scheduled to take place each year in January.

The present event was introduced in 2004, although a similar race, the Warwick (Brooke Bond Oxo) National Chase, had been previously staged until 2000. As with its predecessor, the Classic Chase is usually contested by several horses which subsequently compete in the Grand National. The 2017 winner, One For Arthur, went on to win the Grand National. It was re-classified as a Premier Handicap from the 2023 running when Grade 3 status was renamed by the British Horseracing Authority.

== Winners ==
- Weights given in stones and pounds.

Year	Winner	Age	Weight	Jockey	Trainer
1973	Princess Camilla	8	9-13	Martin Blackshaw	Walter Wharton
1974	Clarification	7	10-00	Jeremy Glover	Roddy Armytage
1975	Abandoned due to waterlogging
1976	Jolly's Clump	10	10-06	Ian Watkinson	Harry Thomson Jones
1977	Cornish Princess	9	10-02	Richard Hoare (Note: amateur jockey)	W Turner
1978	Abandoned due to frost
1979	Abandoned due to frost and snow
1980	Abandoned due to frost
1981	Colonel Christy	6	09–10	Gerry Gracey	Hugh O'Neill
1982	Loving Words	9	10-10	Richard Hoare	John Thorne
1983	Bonum Omen	9	10–13	Kevin Mooney	Fulke Walwyn
1984	Abandoned due to frost
1985	Abandoned due to frost and snow
1986	Knock Hill	10	10-05	Anthony Webber	John Webber
1987	Abandoned due to frost and snow
1988	Abandoned due to snow
1989	Memberson	11	10-07	Guy Upton	Peter Dufosee
1990	Midnight Madness	12	11-01	Rodi Greene	Dai Bloomfield
1991	Aquilifer	11	11-07	Jonothon Lower	Martin Pipe
1992	Woodgate	11	10-09	Carl Llewellyn	Tim Forster
1993	Fiddlers Pike	12	10–11	Rosemary Henderson	Rosemary Henderson
1994	Moorcroft Boy	9	10-10	Adrian Maguire	David Nicholson
1995	Willsford	12	10-07	Warren Marston	Jenny Pitman
1996	Full of Oats	10	09-07	Jim Culloty	Henrietta Knight
1997	Abandoned due to frost
1998	A N C Express	10	10–11	Tom Jenks	Jeff King
1999	Abandoned due to frost
2000	Choisty	10	10-00	Paul W Flynn	Ted Haynes
2001	Saxon Duke	10	09-07	A Bateman	Philip Hobbs
2002	Choisty	12	09-13	Dave Crosse	Ted Haynes
2003	Abandoned due to frost
2004	Southern Star	9	10-01	Graham Lee	Henrietta Knight
2005	Baron Windrush	7	10-03	Carl Llewellyn	Nigel Twiston-Davies
2006	Eurotrek	10	10-09	Ruby Walsh	Paul Nicholls
2007	Ladalko	8	11-01	Ruby Walsh	Paul Nicholls
2008	D'Argent	11	11-07	Robert Thornton	Alan King
2009	Abandoned due to frost
2010	Abandoned due to snow
2011	West End Rocker	9	10–11	Wayne Hutchinson	Alan King
2012	Hey Big Spender	9	11–12	Joe Tizzard	Colin Tizzard
2013	Rigadin de Beauchene	8	10-03	Robbie Dunne	Venetia Williams
2014	Shotgun Paddy	7	11-07	Leighton Aspell	Emma Lavelle
2015	Hawkes Point	10	10–12	Sam Twiston-Davies	Paul Nicholls
2016	Russe Blanc	9	10-07	Charlie Poste	Kerry Lee
2017	One For Arthur	8	10–11	Derek Fox	Lucinda Russell
2018	Milansbar	11	11-02	Bryony Frost	Neil King
2019	Impulsive Star	9	09-12	Sam Waley-Cohen	Neil Mulholland
2020	Kimberlite Candy	8	11-04	Richie McLernon	Tom Lacey
2021	Notachance	7	10-05	Tom Cannon	Alan King
2022	Eclair Surf	8	11-03	Tom Bellamy	Emma Lavelle
2023	Iwilldoit	10	11-10	Stan Sheppard	Sam Thomas
2024	My Silver Lining	8	10-04	James Best	Emma Lavelle
2025	Abandoned due to frost
2026	Abandoned due to frost

== See also ==
- Horse racing in Great Britain
- List of British National Hunt races
