= Hampton Novices' Chase =

Steeplechase horse race in Britain

Hampton Novices' Chase
2026
| Salver | Doyen Quest | Laurens Bay |

Previous years
2025
Jingko Blue | Lowry's Bar | Johnnywho
2024
Grey Dawning | Apple Away | Broadway Boy
2023
Galia Des Liteaux | Complete Unknown | The Goffer
2022
Threeunderthrufive | Doyen Breed | Any News
2021
Next Destination | Fiddlerontheroof | Golan Fortune

2020-2011
2020
Two For Gold | Hold The Note | Whatmore
2019
Ok Corral | Secret Investor | Rocky's Treasure
2018
Ms Parfois | Duel At Dawn | Big River
2017
American | Champers On Ice | Captain Chaos
2016
Black Hercules | Definitly Red | Emily Gray
2015
Sego Success | Grand Vision | Deputy Dan
2014
Corrin Wood | Black Thunder | Court Victory
2013
Rocky Creek | Fill The Power | Highland Lodge
2012
Frascati Park | Alfie Spinner | Court Victory
2011
Shalimar Fromentro | Fruity O'Rooney | Only two finished

2010-2004
2008
Verasi | Old Benny | Gritti Palace
2007
Gungadu | In Accord | Major Catch
2006
Halcon Genelardais | No Full | Rebel Rhythm
2005
L'ami | Control Man | Home James
2004
D'Argent | Tyneandthyneagain | Silver Knight

The Hampton Novices' Chase is a Grade 2 National Hunt steeplechase in Great Britain which is open to horses aged five years or older. It is run at Warwick over a distance of 3 miles (4828 metres), and during its running there are eighteen fences to be jumped. The race is for novice chasers, and it is scheduled to take place each year in January.

The race was given Listed status in 2015 and raised to Grade Two status in 2020.

| Year | Winner | Age | Jockey | Trainer |
|---|---|---|---|---|
| 2004 | D'Argent | 7 | Robert Thornton | Alan King |
| 2005 | L'ami | 6 | Mick Fitzgerald | Francois Doumen |
| 2006 | Halcon Genelardais | 6 | Robert Thornton | Alan King |
| 2007 | Gungadu | 7 | Ruby Walsh | Paul Nicholls |
| 2008 | Verasi | 7 | Philip Hide | Gary Moore |
| 2009 | Abandoned due to frost |
| 2010 | Abandoned due to snow |
| 2011 | Shalimar Fromentro | 5 | Daryl Jacob | Nick Williams |
| 2012 | Frascati Park | 8 | Sam Twiston-Davies | Nigel Twiston-Davies |
| 2013 | Rocky Creek | 7 | Daryl Jacob | Paul Nicholls |
| 2014 | Corrin Wood | 7 | Jason Maguire | Donald McCain |
| 2015 | Sego Success | 7 | Tom Cannon | Alan King |
| 2016 | Black Hercules | 7 | Danny Mullins | Willie Mullins |
| 2017 | American | 7 | Noel Fehily | Harry Fry |
| 2018 | Ms Parfois | 7 | Sean Bowen | Anthony Honeyball |
| 2019 | Ok Corral | 9 | Mr Derek O'Connor | Nicky Henderson |
| 2020 | Two For Gold | 7 | David Bass | Kim Bailey |
| 2021 | Next Destination | 9 | Harry Cobden | Paul Nicholls |
| 2022 | Threeunderthrufive | 7 | Adrian Heskin | Paul Nicholls |
| 2023 | Galia Des Liteaux | 7 | Harry Skelton | Dan Skelton |
| 2024 | Grey Dawning | 7 | Harry Skelton | Dan Skelton |
| 2025 | Jingko Blue | 6 | Nico de Boinville | Nicky Henderson |
| 2026 | Salver | 6 | Caolin Quinn | Gary & Josh Moore |

== See also ==
- Horse racing in Great Britain
- List of British National Hunt races
