= 1989 Champion Hurdle =

60th Champion Hurdle
- Champion Hurdle
- Location: Cheltenham Racecourse
- Date: 14 March 1989
- Winning horse: Beech Road (GB)
- Jockey: Richard Guest
- Trainer: Toby Balding
- Owner: Tony Geake

The 1989 Champion Hurdle was a horse race held at Cheltenham Racecourse on Tuesday 14 March 1989. It was the 60th running of the Champion Hurdle.

The winner was Tony Geake's Beech Road, a seven-year-old chestnut gelding trained in Hampshire by Toby Balding and ridden by Richard Guest. Beech Road's victory was a first in the race for jockey, trainer and owner.

Beech Road had established himself as a useful handicap hurdler in his early career but failed to complete the course when tried over fences on two occasions in the early part of the 1988/1989 National Hunt season. He was switched back to hurdling and earned a place in the championship with a twenty length win in the National Spirit Hurdle at Fontwell Racecourse in February. In the 1989 Champion Hurdle he started a 50/1 outsider and won by two lengths from Celtic Chief, with the 1988 winner Celtic Shot in third place. The 11/8 favourite Kribensis finished seventh. Twelve of the fifteen runners completed the course.

== Race details ==
- Sponsor: Waterford Crystal
- Purse: £83,614; First prize: £50,206
- Going: Good to Soft
- Distance: 2 miles
- Number of runners: 15
- Winner's time: 4m 02.10

== Full result ==
Pos.	Marg.	Horse (bred)	Age	Jockey	Trainer (Country)	Odds
1		Beech Road (GB)	7	Richard Guest	Toby Balding (GB)	50/1
2	2	Celtic Chief (GB)	6	Graham McCourt	Mercy Rimell (GB)	6/1
3	1	Celtic Shot (GB)	7	Peter Scudamore	Charlie Brooks (GB)	8/1
4	nk	Floyd (GB)	9	Simon Sherwood	David Elsworth (GB)	14/1
5	nk	Vagador (CAN)	6	Mark Perrett	Guy Harwood (GB)	20/1
6	1	Mole Board (GB)	7	Hywel Davies	Jim Old (GB)	20/1
7	7	Kribensis (IRE)	5	Richard Dunwoody	Michael Stoute (GB)	11/8 fav
8	10	Cloughtaney (GB)	8	Willie Mullins	Paddy Mullins (IRE)	33/1
9	shd	Chatam (USA)	5	Jonathon Lower	Martin Pipe (GB)	14/1
10		Condor Pan	6	Tommy Carmody	Jim Bolger (IRE)	16/1
11		Wishlon (USA)	6	Ian Shoemark	Ron Smyth (GB)	40/1
12		Grey Salute (CAN)	6	Steve Smith Eccles	John Jenkins (GB)	10/1
Fell		Sprowston Boy (GB)	6	Dermot Browne	Paul Kelleway (GB)	100/1
Fell		Cashew King	6	Trevor Wall	Bryan McMahon (GB)	100/1
Fell		Chesham Squire	5	Graham Bradley	David Elsworth (GB)	66/1

- Abbreviations: nse = nose; nk = neck; hd = head; dist = distance; UR = unseated rider; PU = pulled up; LFT = left at start; SU = slipped up; BD = brought down

== Winner's details ==
Further details of the winner, Beech Road

- Sex: Gelding
- Foaled: 8 April 1982
- Country: United Kingdom
- Sire: Nearly A Hand; Dam: North Bovey (Flush Royal)
- Owner: Tony Geake
- Breeder: J. Tilling
