= Richard Guest (jockey) =

English jockey

Personal information
- Born: 10 July 1965 (age 61) Andover, England
- Occupation: Jockey

Horse racing career
- Sport: Horse racing

Major racing wins
- Grand National (2001) Becher Chase (1994) Champion Hurdle (1989) County Hurdle (1987)

Significant horses
- Red Marauder, Beech Road
- Updated on 26 Jan 2022

Richard Charles Guest (born 10 July 1965) is a retired National Hunt jockey and trainer.

== Background ==
Guest comes from an racing family. His father Charles was a successful jockey and trainer; his uncle Joe Guest was also a jockey who most notably won the Mildmay of Flete Chase in 1960 on Devon Customer. Richard Guest's brother Rae is a retired jockey and trainer. His sister, Jane, is the widow of trainer Sir Henry Cecil.

== Riding career ==
Early in his career as a jockey, Guest rode out at Sir Michael Stoute's yard where the horses he exercised included the Derby winner Shergar. Following this he joined Toby Balding near his home in Andover, and in his apprentice season of 1986 scored seven winners. The following year, Guest won 20 races including the County Hurdle on Neblin at the Cheltenham Festival.

One of Guest's best known winners was Beech Road, who he partnered to victory in the 1989 Champion Hurdle at the Cheltenham Festival at a price of 50/1. Guest achieved success at Aintree in 1994 with Into The Red winning the Becher Chase; the following year the pair finished fifth in the Grand National.

In 1998, Guest was charged with three breaches of the non-triers' rule in a single season and handed in his racing licence at Perth Racecourse. The following year, he renewed his licence in order to ride for owner Norman Mason. He also became an assistant trainer to Mason at Brancepeth, County Durham. In 2001, Guest achieved his biggest career win when he rode Red Marauder, owned and trained by Mason, to win the Grand National at odds of 33/1. The race was run in atrocious weather conditions with only four horses finishing, two of them after being remounted. In 2003, Guest took out a full training licence.

Guest gave up his trainer's licence in 2021, when he lost an appeal against eviction from his Ingmanthorpe stables.

== Cheltenham Festival winners (2) ==
- Champion Hurdle - (1) Beech Road (1989)
- County Hurdle - (1) Neblin (1987)

== Major wins ==
(United Kingdom) Great Britain

- Champion Hurdle - (1) Beech Road (1989)
