= Sefton Novices' Hurdle =

Hurdle horse race in Britain

- Class: Grade 1
- Location: Aintree Racecourse; Merseyside, England
- Inaugurated: 1988
- Race type: Hurdle race
- Sponsor: Cavani Menswear
- Website: Aintree

Race information
- Distance: 3m 149y (4,964 metres)
- Surface: Turf
- Track: Left-handed
- Qualification: Four-years-old and up
- Weight: 10 st 8 lb (4yo); 11 st 7 lb (5yo+); Allowances; 7 lb for fillies and mares
- Purse: £100,000 (2022); 1st: £56,270

Sefton Novices' Hurdle
2026
Zeus Power	Catchintsavo	Johnny's Jury

Previous years
2025
Julius Des Pictons	Minella Rescue	Crest Of Fortune
2024
Dancing City	The Jukebox Man	Cherie D'am
2023
Apple Away	Maximilian	Iroko
2022
Gelino Bello	Gentleman At Arms	Haute Estime
2021
Ahoy Senor	Bravemansgame	Oscar Elite

2020-2011
2019
Champ	Emitom	Lisnagar Oscar
2018
Santini	Roksana	Tower Bridge
2017
The Worlds End	Beyond Conceit	Debece
2016
Ballyoptic	Bellshill	Potters Legend
2015
Thistlecrack	Vyta Du Roc	Our Kaempfer
2014
Beat That	Cole Harden	Seeyouatmidnight
2013
At Fishers Cross	Just A Par	Buachaill Alainn
2012
Lovcen	Fingal Bay	Cotton Mill
2011
Saint Are	Cantlow	Sparky May

2010-2001
2010
Wayward Prince	Western Leader	Cannington Brook
2009
Ogee	Comhla Ri Coig	According To Dick
2008
Pettifour	Gone To Lunch	The Tother One
2007
Chief Dan George	Wichita Lineman	Imperial Commander
2006
Black Jack Ketchum	Money Trix	Neptune Collonges
2005
Asian Maze	Brewster	Football Crazy
2004
Accipiter	Grey Report	Champagne Harry
2003
Iris's Gift	Royal Emperor	Supreme Prince
2002
Stromness	Tarxien	Stormez
2001
Garruth	Historic	Hindiana

2000-1991
2000
Sackville	No Discount	What's Up Boys
1999
King's Road	Ballysicyos	Santabless
1998
Unsinkable Boxer	Brackenheath	Cloone Bridge
1997
Forest Ivory	Private Peace	Mentmore Towers
1996
Pleasure Shared	Superior Risk	Buckhouse Boy
1995
Morgans Harbour	Jack Button	Conquering Leader
1994
Corner Boy	Corrouge	What A Question
1993
Cardinal Red	Gaelstrom	As Du Trefle
1992
Barton Bank	Bishop's Island	Triple Witching
1991
Derring Valley	Rocktor	Montagnard

1990-1988
1990
Dwadme	What's The Crack	Tinryland
1989
Boreen Belle	King's Harvest	Royal Athlete
1988
Rustle	Nick The Brief	Vulgan Warrior

The Sefton Novices' Hurdle is a Grade 1 National Hunt hurdle race in Great Britain which is open to horses aged four years or older. It is run at Aintree over a distance of about 3 miles and half a furlong (4,964 metres), and during its running there are thirteen hurdles to be jumped. The race is for novice hurdlers, and it is scheduled to take place each year during the Grand National meeting in early April.

The event was established in 1988, and it was originally called the White Satin Novices' Hurdle. For a period it was classed at Grade 2 level. The race was given its present title in 1993, and it was promoted to Grade 1 status in 1995.

In recent years the Sefton Novices' Hurdle has usually featured horses which ran in the previous month's Spa Novices' Hurdle, and the last to achieve victory in both races was At Fishers Cross in 2013.

== Records ==
Leading jockey (3 wins):

- Tony McCoy – Unsinkable Boxer (1998), Black Jack Ketchum (2006), At Fishers Cross (2013)
- Barry Geraghty – Sackville (2000), Iris's Gift (2003), Beat That (2014)

Leading trainer (4 wins):

- Nicky Henderson – Rustle (1988), Beat That (2014), Santini (2018), Champ (2019)

== Winners ==
Year	Winner	Age	Jockey	Trainer
1988	Rustle	6	Michael Bowlby	Nicky Henderson
1989	Boreen Belle	7	Charlie Swan	Bill Harney
1990	Dwadme	5	Jamie Osborne	Oliver Sherwood
1991	Derring Valley	6	Graham McCourt	Anthony Jones
1992	Barton Bank	6	Carl Llewellyn	David Nicholson
1993	Cardinal Red	6	Ben de Haan	Cath Walwyn
1994	Corner Boy	7	Adrian Maguire	David Nicholson
1995	Morgan's Harbour	9	Peter Niven	Mary Reveley
1996	Pleasure Shared	8	Paul Carberry	Philip Hobbs
1997	Forest Ivory	6	Richard Johnson	David Nicholson
1998	Unsinkable Boxer	9	Tony McCoy	Martin Pipe
1999	King's Road	6	Carl Llewellyn	Nigel Twiston-Davies
2000	Sackville	7	Barry Geraghty	Frances Crowley
2001	Garruth	7	Russ Garritty	Tim Easterby
2002	Stromness	5	Robert Thornton	Alan King
2003	Iris's Gift	6	Barry Geraghty	Jonjo O'Neill
2004	Accipiter	5	Tom Best	Toby Balding
2005	Asian Maze	6	Ruby Walsh	Tom Mullins
2006	Black Jack Ketchum	7	Tony McCoy	Jonjo O'Neill
2007	Chief Dan George	7	Mick Fitzgerald	James Moffatt
2008	Pettifour	6	Paddy Brennan	Nigel Twiston-Davies
2009	Ogee	6	Jimmy McCarthy	Renee Robeson
2010	Wayward Prince	6	Dougie Costello	Ian Williams
2011	Saint Are	5	Richard Johnson	Tim Vaughan
2012	Lovcen	7	Robert Thornton	Alan King
2013	At Fishers Cross	6	Tony McCoy	Rebecca Curtis
2014	Beat That	6	Barry Geraghty	Nicky Henderson
2015	Thistlecrack	7	Tom Scudamore	Colin Tizzard
2016	Ballyoptic	6	Ryan Hatch	Nigel Twiston-Davies
2017	The Worlds End	6	Adrian Heskin	Tom George
2018	Santini	6	Nico de Boinville	Nicky Henderson
2019	Champ	7	Mark Walsh	Nicky Henderson
	no race 2020 (Note: The 2020 running was cancelled because of the COVID-19 pandemic in the United Kingdom)
2021	Ahoy Senor	6	Derek Fox	Lucinda Russell
2022	Gelino Bello	6	Harry Cobden	Paul Nicholls
2023	Apple Away	6	Stephen Mulqueen	Lucinda Russell
2024	Dancing City	7	Paul Townend	Willie Mullins
2025	Julius Des Pictons	6	Gavin Sheehan	Jamie Snowden
2026	Zeus Power	5	JJ Slevin	Joseph O'Brien

== See also ==
- Horse racing in Great Britain
- List of British National Hunt races
- Recurring sporting events established in 1988 – this race is included under its original title, White Satin Novices' Hurdle.
