= Randox =

UK diagnostics company

Randox Laboratories Ltd.
- Type: Private limited company
- Founded: 1982
- Founder: Peter FitzGerald
- Headquarters: Crumlin, County Antrim, Northern Ireland, UK
- Number of locations: 145 countries
- Key people: Peter FitzGerald (owner)
- Revenue: ▲£619,000,000 (2021)
- Net income: ▲£275,000,000 (2021)
- Total assets: ▼£47,700,000 (2018)
- Website: www.randox.com

Randox is a Northern Irish health and toxicology company in the in vitro diagnostics industry headquartered in Crumlin, County Antrim, Northern Ireland, owned by Peter FitzGerald. The company develops diagnostic solutions for hospitals, clinical, research and molecular labs, food testing, forensic toxicology, veterinary labs and life sciences. It develops, manufactures and markets reagents and equipment for laboratory medicine, with a distribution network of 145 countries. Randox is the biggest polymerase chain reaction testing provider in the United Kingdom and Republic of Ireland.

== History ==
Randox was established in 1982 by its owner, Peter FitzGerald, in Crumlin, Northern Ireland. and grew to have 2,700 employees by 2020. In 2014 it invested €25 million in developing a site in Dungloe, County Donegal, aiming to create more than 470 jobs in research, engineering and life sciences by 2020. It moved into the Randox Science Park, a 45-acre R&D and manufacturing site housed on the former Massereene Barracks in 2019. Randox Health has sponsored the Grand National at Aintree racecourse since 2017. The company was restructured in March 2020 to be ultimately held by Randox (IOM) Ltd based in the Isle of Man. The company stated this was "to support any future transfer of company ownership to future generations" but The Times noted that the move could help the company avoid paying millions in tax. In April 2022, the company purchased Boston House in Fitzroy Square, London for £29m from the entrepreneur Touker Suleyman and was expected to spend a further £15m to convert the property into The Randox Institute which will be an education centre for personalised healthcare.

=== Data tampering and toxicology fraud ===
In 2014 Randox acquired a laboratory in Manchester from Trimega Laboratories which had gone into administration. In February 2017, two Randox employees were arrested on suspicion of perverting the course of justice amid allegations of data tampering within Randox Testing Services, used by many Police Forces in England and Wales for forensic toxicology. As of November 2017, around 50 criminal prosecutions for driving offences had been dropped in what BBC home affairs correspondent, Danny Shaw, described as "the biggest forensic science scandal in the UK for decades". Police forces have begun reviewing over 10,000 criminal cases that may be affected by the alleged data manipulation, including sexual and violent crimes. In 2021, after 5 years of investigation, the Greater Manchester Police (GMP) announced that up to 27,000 cases could be impacted.

Randox will pay £2.5 million to fund the National Police Chiefs' Council (NPCC) retesting program.

=== Lobbying government ===
In March 2019 it was reported that former cabinet minister and Conservative MP Owen Paterson, who was a consultant to Randox, had helped to lobby the government to seek contracts for them. This violated rules stating that an MP may not lobby on behalf of a paying client. Paterson communicated with the Food Standards Agency three times in relation to testing for antibiotics in milk and the Department for International Development four times in relation to blood testing.

=== Coronavirus testing ===
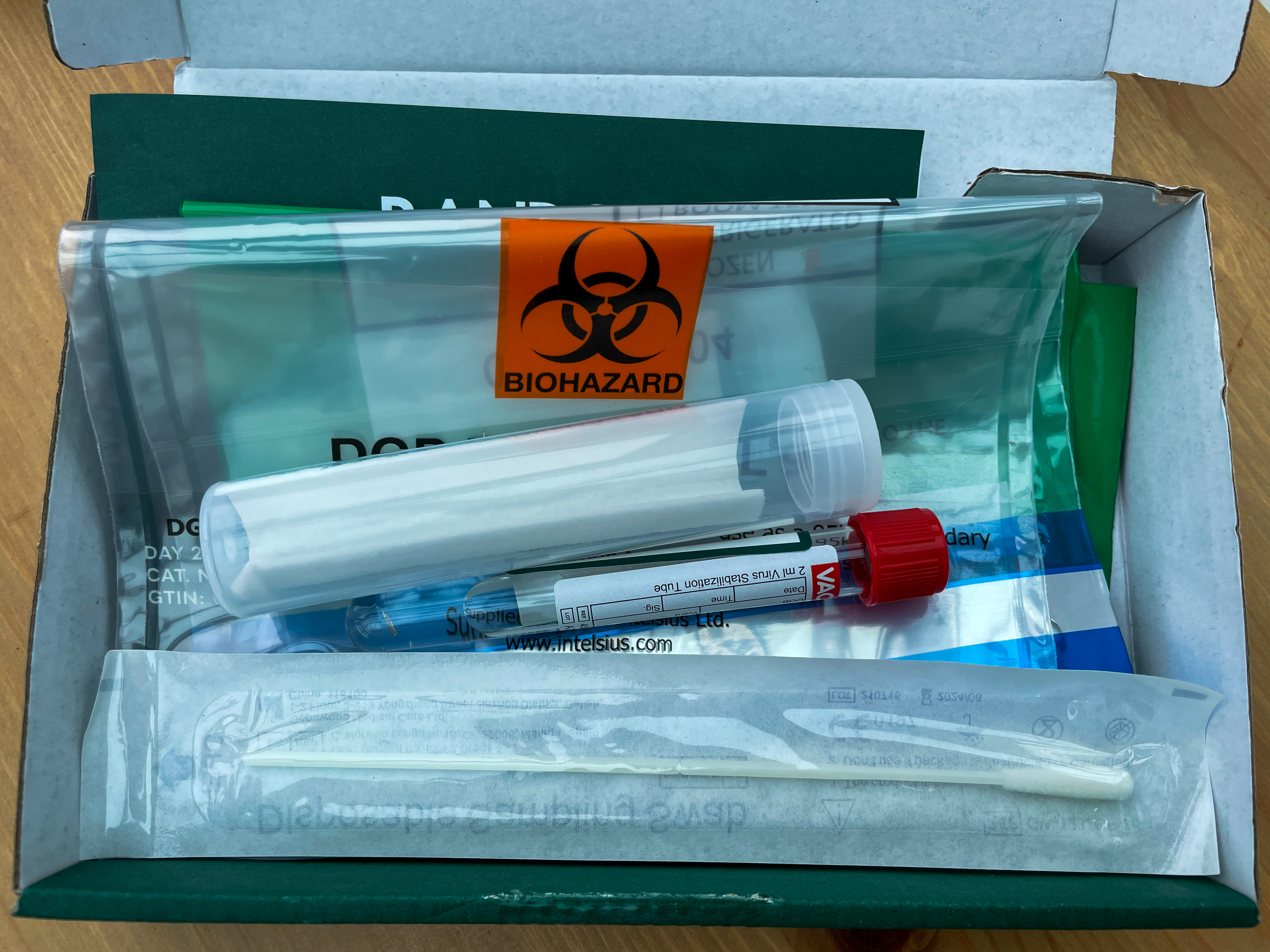
A Randox PCR home test kit in the UK, showing the swab, and multi-layer packaging to deliver it to the lab

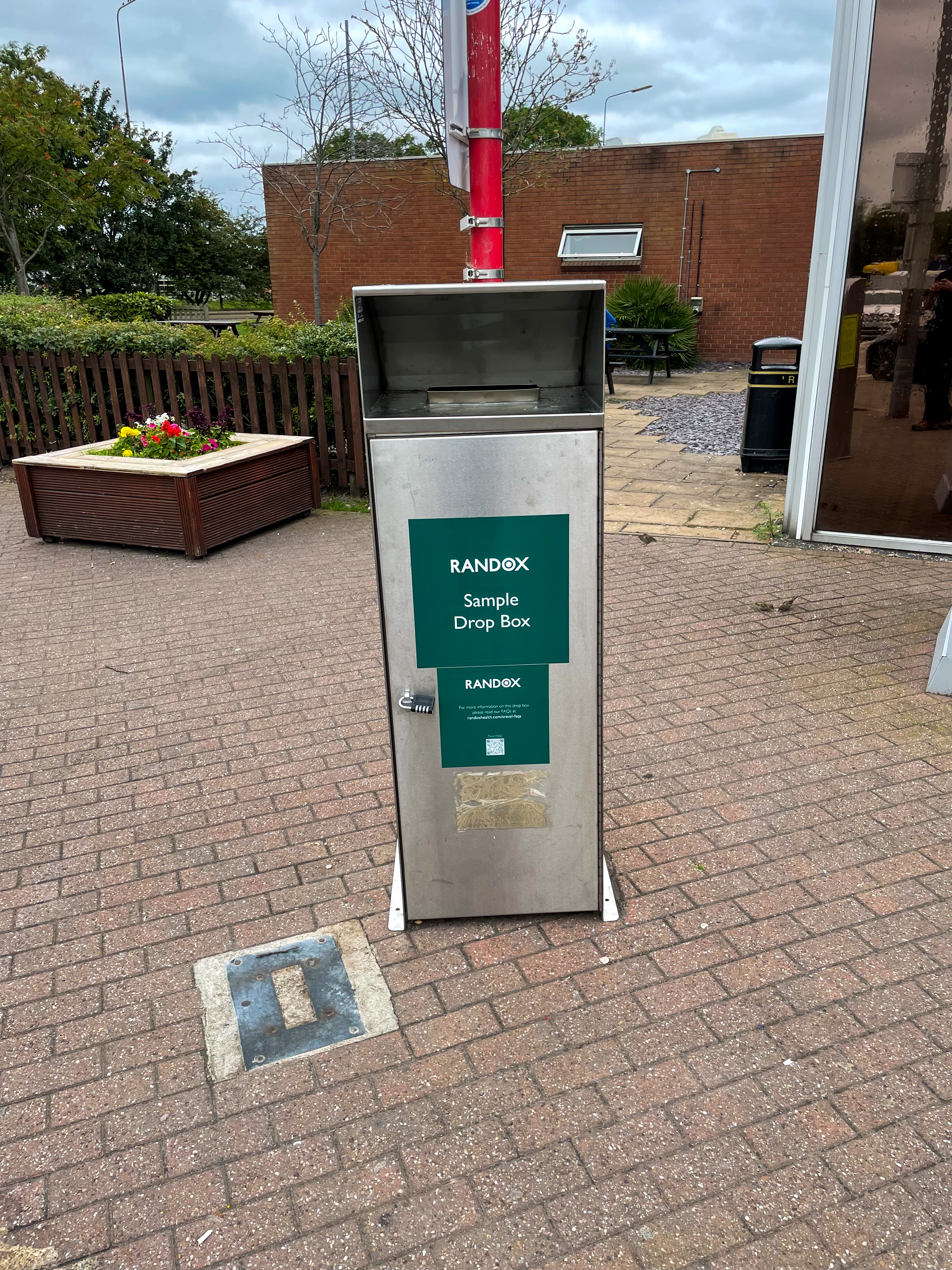
A Randox sample drop box

In May 2020, the company was awarded a £133 million contract by the Department of Health and Social Care (DHSC) without having to compete for a tender. When asked if Paterson had lobbied on behalf of the company a spokesman for DHSC said they were "unable to comment on the personnel matters of other organisations".

On 7 August 2020, the United Kingdom Medicines and Healthcare Products Regulatory Agency requested Randox to recall the Randox COVID-19 Home Testing Kit due to safety concerns in a measure it described as precautionary.

On 4 November 2020, the UK awarded a 6-month extension of the original contract for £347 million in COVID-19 testing without a public tender. On 16 November, Channel 4's Dispatches said that Randox were managing test processing facilities in a manner which could lead to people not receiving test results, cross contamination through the leaking of test results, and workers facing unsafe conditions; however, Randox denies these claims. In June 2021, the company signed a two-year deal with the British Olympic Association to test the British Team for COVID-19.

In total, Randox was awarded £777m by the UK government for COVID testing and it provided 23 million tests. It contributed to Randox's sales increasing from £118m in 2018 to £218m from January 2019 to June 2020 and to £619m the following year. The company moved from making a loss prior to June 2020 to a pre-tax profit of £275m the following year. The National Audit Office (NAO) reported in March 2022 on the government's contracts with Randox, observing that "the documentation of the decision-making process for such large contracts was inadequate", and Government did "not document key decisions adequately when awarding a contract". The gaps in the audit trail meant the NAO was "not able to provide positive assurance in the normal way, but [the NAO] has not seen any evidence that the government’s contracts with Randox were awarded improperly".

=== Employment ===
Several legal actions were taken by many employees against the company. An employee filed a lawsuit against Randox after being discriminated against because of his weight. In addition, its former international business manager was also fired following an altercation at a meeting with a senior manager, regarding inaccurate figures. This came after being praised for his efforts in India and for a presentation on the business plan for Randox. The tribunal awarded him over £70,000 for Randox's unfair dismissal, following Randox's claim that he had been employed through their Indian subsidiary in order to circumvent UK employment law.

With the support of Unite legal services, a female Randox employee sued Randox after a dispute over maternity pay. The court favoured the employee and granted her compensation.

In April 2021, Randox posted notices in its Donegal Gaeltacht facility forbidding employees from speaking any language other than English in the workplace. The company receives significant funding from Údarás na Gaeltachta, which is charged with industrial development in Irish-speaking areas. When challenged, the company withdrew the notices, but the matter received significant attention in the Irish media.

=== Advertising ===
In 2024, Randox took down ads for its Type 1 diabetes genetic risk assessment assay amid concerns that it was using fear to sell the test.
