= Becher Chase =

Steeplechase horse race in Britain

Becher Handicap Chase
- Class: Premier Handicap
- Location: Aintree Racecourse; Merseyside, England
- Race type: Steeplechase
- Website: Aintree Becher Chase

Race information
- Distance: 3 miles 1 furlong 188 yards (5,201 metres)
- Surface: Turf
- Track: Left-handed
- Qualification: Six-years-old and up
- Weight: Handicap
- Purse: £150,000 (2025); 1st: £84,195

Becher Handicap Chase
2023
Chambard	Coko Beach	Percussion

Previous years
2022
Ashtown Lad	Gesskille	Percussion
2021
Snow Leopardess	Hill Sixteen	Checkitout

2020-2011
2020
Vieux Lion Rouge	Kimberlite Candy	Le Breuil
2019
Walk In The Mill	Kimberlite Candy	Alpha Des Obeaux
2018
Walk In The Mill	Vieux Lion Rouge	Ultragold
2017
Blaklion	The Last Samuri	Highland Lodge
2016
Vieux Lion Rouge	Highland Lodge	The Last Samuri
2015
Highland Lodge	Dare To Endeavour	Dolatulo
2014
Oscar Time	Mendip Express	Saint Are
2013
Chance Du Roy	Baby Run	Mr Moonshine
2012
Hello Bud	Join Together	Big Fella Thanks
2011
West End Rocker	Niche Market	Ballyvesey

2010-2001
2010
Hello Bud	Royal Rosa	One Cool Cookie
2009
Vic Venturi	Keenan's Future	Royal Rosa
2008
Black Apalachi	Mr Pointment	Oulart
2007
Mr Pointment	Bewleys Berry	Pak Jack
2006
Eurotrek	Bewleys Berry	Dunbrody Millar
2005
Garvivonnian	Le Duc	Just in Debt
2004
Silver Birch	Just in Debt	Smarty
2003
Clan Royal	Amberleigh House	Ardent Scout
2002
Ardent Scout	Amberleigh House	Blowing Wind
2001
Amberleigh House	Smarty	Church Place

2000-1992
2000
Young Kenny	Ardent Scout	Paddy's Return
1999
Feels Like Gold	Him Of Praise	Hollybank Buck
1998
Earth Summit	Samlee	Back Bar
1997
Samlee	Court Melody	Valiant Warrior
1996
Into The Red	Young Hustler	Glemot
1995
Young Hustler	Sir Peter Lely	Over The Stream
1994
Into The Red	Feathered Gale	Whaat Fettle
1993
Indian Tonic	Southern Minstrel	Mister Ed
1992
Kildimo	Four Trix	The Antartex

The Becher Chase is a Premier Handicap National Hunt steeplechase in Great Britain which is open to horses aged six years or older. It is run at Aintree over a distance of about 3 miles and 2 furlongs (3 miles 1 furlong and 188 yards, or 5,201 metres), and during its running there are twenty-one fences to be jumped. It is a handicap race, and it is scheduled to take place each year in November or December.

It is run over the same fences as Aintree's most famous race, the Grand National, and it serves as an early-season trial for that event. Two winners have gone on to win the Grand National; Amberleigh House and Silver Birch. Earth Summit won the race in 1998 following his Grand National win the previous April.

One of the obstacles jumped is Becher's Brook, which is named in memory of Martin Becher (1799–1864). The Becher Chase was established in 1992, when a new race meeting was introduced at Aintree. For the twenty years prior to this, the Grand National meeting had been the venue's only horse racing fixture of the year. The Becher Chase was upgraded to Grade Three by the British Horseracing Board (BHA) from its 2014 running and was re-classified as a Premier Handicap from the 2022 running when Grade 3 status was renamed by the BHA.

== Records ==
Most successful horse (2 wins):

- Into The Red – 1994, 1996
- Hello Bud - 2010, 2012
- Walk In The Mill - 2018, 2019
- Vieux Lion Rouge - 2016, 2020

Most successful jockey (2 wins):

- Chris Maude - Indian Tonic (1993), Young Hustler (1995)
- Tony Dobbin - Into The Red (1996), Feels Like Gold (1999)
- Sam Twiston-Davies - Hello Bud (2010, 2012)
- James Best - Walk In The Mill (2018, 2019)

Most successful trainer (6 wins):

- Nigel Twiston-Davies - Indian Tonic (1993), Young Hustler (1995), Earth Summit (1998), Hello Bud (2010, 2012), Blaklion (2017)

== Winners ==
- Weights given in stones and pounds.

Year	Winner	Age	Weight	Jockey	Trainer
1992	Kildimo	12	10-03	Lorcan Wyer	Sue Smith
1993	Indian Tonic	7	10-06	Chris Maude	Nigel Twiston-Davies
1994	Into the Red	10	10-04	Richard Guest	John White
1995	Young Hustler	8	12-00	Chris Maude	Nigel Twiston-Davies
1996	Into the Red	12	10-00	Tony Dobbin	Mary Reveley
1997	Samlee	8	10-00	Rodney Farrant	Philip Hobbs
1998	Earth Summit	10	12-00	Tom Jenks	Nigel Twiston-Davies
1999	Feels Like Gold	11	10-00	Tony Dobbin	Nicky Richards
2000	Young Kenny	9	12-00	Russ Garritty	Peter Beaumont
2001	Amberleigh House	9	10-09	Warren Marston	Ginger McCain
2002	Ardent Scout	10	09-11	Dominic Elsworth	Sue Smith
2003	Clan Royal	8	10–12	Liam Cooper	Jonjo O'Neill
2004	Silver Birch	7	10-01	Ruby Walsh	Paul Nicholls
2005	Garvivonnian	10	10-04	Garrett Cotter	Ned Mitchell
2006	Eurotrek	10	11-07	Liam Heard	Paul Nicholls
2007	Mr Pointment	8	11-05	Sam Thomas	Paul Nicholls
2008	Black Apalachi	9	10-05	Denis O'Regan	Dessie Hughes
2009	Vic Venturi	9	11–12	Paddy Flood	Dessie Hughes
2010	Hello Bud	12	10-05	Sam Twiston-Davies	Nigel Twiston-Davies
2011	West End Rocker	9	10–10	Wayne Hutchinson	Alan King
2012	Hello Bud	14	10-00	Sam Twiston-Davies	Nigel Twiston-Davies
2013	Chance du Roy	9	10-06	Tom O'Brien	Philip Hobbs
2014	Oscar Time	13	10–12	Sam Waley-Cohen (Note: amateur rider)	Robert Waley-Cohen
2015	Highland Lodge	9	10-00	Henry Brooke	James Moffatt
2016	Vieux Lion Rouge	7	10-09	Tom Scudamore	David Pipe
2017	Blaklion	8	11-06	Gavin Sheehan	Nigel Twiston-Davies
2018	Walk In The Mill	8	10-03	James Best	Robert Walford
2019	Walk In The Mill	9	10-08	James Best	Robert Walford
2020	Vieux Lion Rouge	11	10-07	Conor O'Farrell	David Pipe
2021	Snow Leopardess	9	10-04	Aidan Coleman	Charlie Longsdon
2022	Ashtown Lad	8	11-05	Harry Skelton	Dan Skelton
2023	Chambard	11	10-01	Lucy Turner	Venetia Williams
2024	Abandoned due to high winds
2025	Twig	10	11-00	Beau Morgan	Ben Pauling

== See also ==
- Horse racing in Great Britain
- List of British National Hunt races
