= Blaklion =

British-bred Thoroughbred racehorse

- Sire: Kayf Tara
- Dam: Franciscaine
- Damsire: Legend Of France
- Sex: Gelding
- Foaled: 3 April 2009
- Country: Great Britain
- Colour: Bay
- Breeder: Mrs M D W Morrison
- Owner: Darren & Annaley Yates
- Trainer: Dan Skelton
- Record: 37:11,6,3
- Earnings: £460,612

Blaklion (born 3 April 2009) is a British thoroughbred racehorse trained by Dan Skelton.

He is best known for winning the Grade 1 2016 RSA Chase at the Cheltenham Festival.

== Career ==
Blaklion was bred in Britain but started his racing career in Ireland at Loughanmore. He was trained by Colin McKeever and competed in four races, winning at Tinahely before moving to Nigel Twiston-Davies yard in England.

He followed this with a win on first outing at Ffos Las. Of his first six races in Britain, he won five. Including the Grade 2 Persian War Novices Hurdle at Chepstow. He would try to win the Albert Bartlett at the Cheltenham Festival, but was pulled up despite winning two preliminary races at Cheltenham and Doncaster.

For 2016, Blaklion switched to Chase fences and picked up his first win at Cheltenham in December. Following this up with another win at Wetherby, and ultimately his biggest career win to date at the Cheltenham Festival winning the RSA Chase. He would cap the season with third place in the Mildmay Novices Chase at Aintree on Grand National Weekend.

Blaklion wouldn't win again until December 2017, taking the Becher Chase on the Grand National course. By this time, Blaklion was being prepared for a National tilt and wind surgery in February 2018 saw him line up at 14/1 for the National in April. He was brought down at the first fence.

Early in 2019, Blaklion was sold for £300,000 to Darren Yates. He would initially switch training to Philip Kirby, and later to Dan Skelton without a run in between. Following a 623-day break from racing, Blaklion would finish 11 of 14 at Ascot in October 2020. In 2021, he would once again attempt to win the Grand National this time finishing sixth having gone to post at 50/1.

Blaklion would go on to win two races in 2021 at Haydock Park. Blaklion returned to Aintree for the 2022 Grand National, finishing 14th.

Retired in 2022 Blaklion is now living in the Cotswolds, looked after by Fay Shulton his stable lass when trained by Nigel Twiston Davies.
