= Warwick Racecourse =

Horse racing venue in Warwick, England

Coordinates: 52°16′47″N 1°36′1″W

Warwick
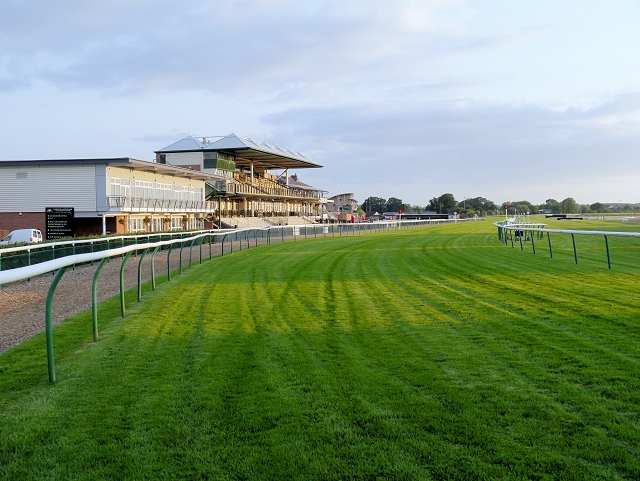
- The racetrack beside the grandstands
- Interactive map of Warwick
- Location: Hampton Street; Warwick; Warwickshire; CV34 6HN
- Owned by: Jockey Club Racecourses
- Screened on: Racing TV
- Course type: National Hunt
- Notable races: Hampton Novices' Chase; Classic Chase; Kingmaker Novices' Chase

Warwick Racecourse is a horse racing course in Warwick, England. It is a National Hunt racing course and has a programme of 25 meetings throughout the year, many of which are televised. The first stand was built in 1808, and its most recent redevelopment was completed in 2018. In the racecourse is a nine-hole golf course and a golf driving range. The area is a popular place for local people to walk their dogs. There is parking next to the course and it is a five-minute walk away from the town centre.

== End of Flat racing ==
In 2014, Jockey Club Racecourses, who run Warwick, announced plans for a 17-fixture all-Jumps race programme from 2015 and a vision for the Midlands track to become regarded as one of the UK's leading small Jumps courses within the next five years. The course had formerly staged both Flat racing and National Hunt racing but was forced to abandon Flat racing after an incident in May 2014 in which a horse, Artful Lady, had to be euthanized after a fall at the track. Four fixtures due to be staged at Warwick were transferred to other courses, and at the end of July the decision to end Flat racing at the course was announced. Warwick's final Flat fixture took place on 26 August 2014 with the last race being won by Louis Vee, ridden by Luke Morris.

== Notable races ==
Month	DOW	Race Name	Type	Grade	Distance	Age/Sex
December	Thursday	Lady Godiva Mares' Novices' Chase	Chase	Listed	2m 4f	4yo+ m
January	Saturday	Hampton Novices' Chase	Chase	Grade 2	3m	5yo+
January	Saturday	Classic Chase	Chase	Premier Handicap	3m 5f	5yo+
February	Saturday	Kingmaker Novices' Chase	Chase	Grade 2	2m	5yo+
February	Saturday	Warwick Mares' Hurdle	Hurdle	Listed	2m 5f	4yo+ m
