= Derek Fox (jockey) =

Irish jockey (born 1992)

- Occupation: Jockey
- Born: 14 May 1992 (age 33); Sligo, Ireland
- Nationality: Irish

Major racing wins
- Grand National (2017, 2023); Sefton Novices' Hurdle (2021); Mildmay Novices' Chase (2022)

Derek Fox (born 14 May 1992) is an Irish jockey. He won the 2017 Grand National on One For Arthur. He also won the Grand National a second time in 2023 on Corach Rambler.

== Major wins ==
(United Kingdom) Great Britain

- Grand National - One For Arthur (2017), Corach Rambler (2023)
- Mildmay Novices' Chase - Ahoy Senor (2022)
- Sefton Novices' Hurdle - Ahoy Senor (2021)
