= Lucinda Russell =

Scottish horse trainer

Lucinda Russell OBE (born 24 June 1966) is a Scottish horse trainer. She trained 2017 Grand National winner One For Arthur and the 2023 Grand National winner Corach Rambler.

She is the partner of the former National Hunt jockey Peter Scudamore. Russell was appointed Officer of the Order of the British Empire in the 2018 Birthday Honours.

== Major wins ==
(United Kingdom) Great Britain

- Grand National - (2) - One For Arthur (2017), Corach Rambler (2023)
- Mildmay Novices' Chase - (1) - Ahoy Senor (2022)
- Sefton Novices' Hurdle - (2) - Ahoy Senor (2021), Apple Away (2023)
- Albert Bartlett Novices' Hurdle - (1) - Brindisi Breeze (2012)
