= Aintree Racecourse =

Horse racing venue in Liverpool, England

Coordinates: 53°28′37″N 2°56′30″W

Aintree
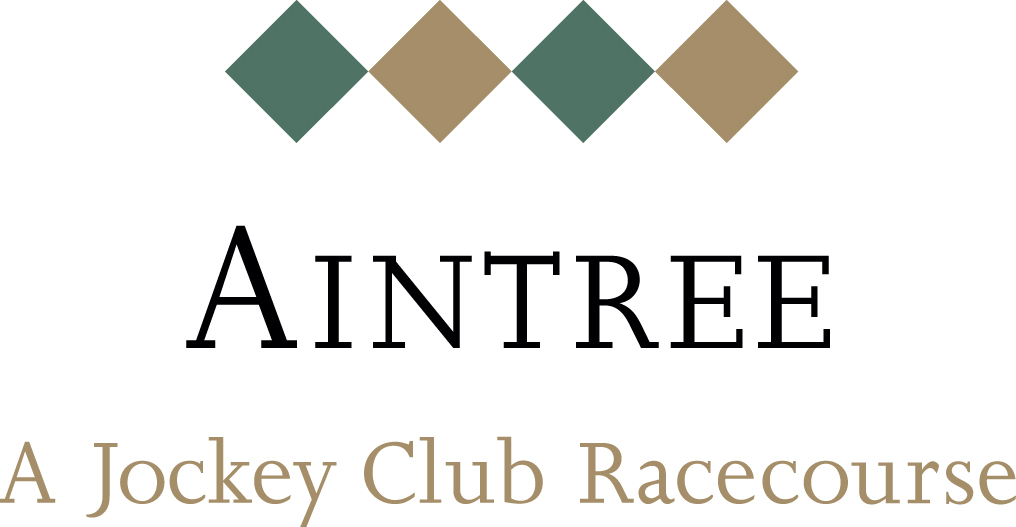

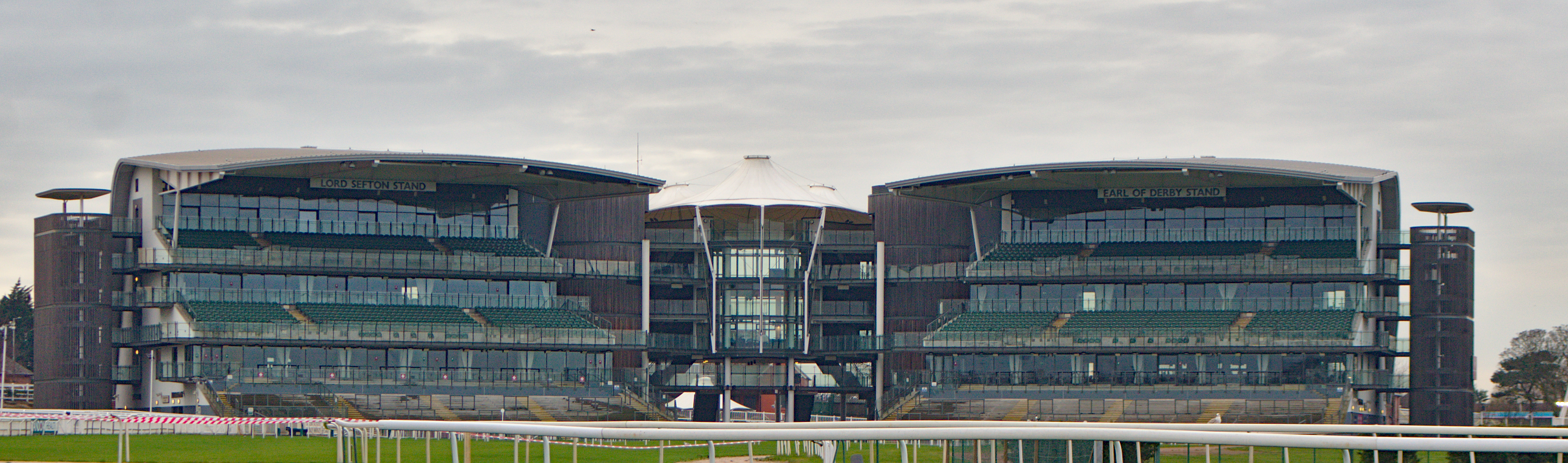
- The Lord Sefton & Earl of Derby Stands
- Interactive map of Aintree
- Location: Aintree, Merseyside, England
- Owned by: Jockey Club Racecourses
- Date opened: 7 July 1829
- Screened on: Racing TV
- Course type: National Hunt
- Notable races: Grand National

Aintree Racecourse is a racecourse in Aintree, Merseyside, England, near Liverpool. The racecourse is the venue for the Grand National steeplechase, which takes place annually in April over three days. Aintree also holds meetings in May, October (Sunday), November and December (both Saturdays).

The Aintree Racecourse had suffered three major disruptions in post-war history, starting with the 1993 Grand National due to a series of false starts and no winner was announced, followed by the 1997 Grand National, postponed to Monday because of an IRA bomb threat and the 2023 Grand National was delayed due to Animal Rights protesters.

== History ==
Horse racing was popular in Liverpool from at least Tudor times, In the 18th century Nicholas Blundell organised races on the sands at Crosby.

In 1829, William Lynn, the owner of the Waterloo Hotel in Ranelagh Street, Liverpool, approached the Second Earl of Sefton, William Philip Molyneux, whose nickname was 'Lord Dashalong', about leasing land to organise flat racing.

Lord Sefton liked racing, so he agreed. He laid the foundation stone on 7 February 1829, and placed a container of sovereigns inside the footings. Lynn built a grandstand in time for the first meeting at Aintree racecourse on 7 July 1829, designed by John Foster Jr. The opening race was the Croxteth Stakes over 1 mile 2 furlongs, and was won by Mufti. In 1835 Lynn organised hurdle racing, which was a great success, especially when a well-known, rider, Captain Martin Becher, agreed to take part and rode a horse named Vivian to two victories. The story goes that Becher told Lynn about the Great St. Albans Steeplechase, a four-mile point-to-point race across country, which was first run in 1830. This caught Lynn's imagination and he decided that he wanted a similar race at Aintree.

With Becher's help Lynn organised the Liverpool Grand Steeplechase, first run on 29 February 1836. There were ten runners, to be ridden by gentlemen riders only, all carrying twelve stone, with the winner, sold if demanded. for two hundred sovereigns. Captain Becher (after whom Becher's Brook is named) rode The Duke to victory. The winner was owned by Mr Sirdfield, landlord of the George Inn at Great Crosby. Some racing historians regard this 1836 race as the first Grand National, but most favour the 1839 event as the inaugural one. The Duke won again in 1837, Sir William in 1838. There is even some disagreement as to the venue for the 1836 to 1838 races, with the nearby Maghull (which was opened in 1827 by a landowner, John Formby) having its supporters.

By 1839 the aristocracy was taking an interest: Lords Derby, Eglinton, Wilton, Sefton and Lord George Bentinck backed a national racing event at Aintree. The race was named the 'Grand Liverpool Steeplechase' and advertised as being "four miles across country" – though starting and finishing on the established racecourse. There were 29 obstacles, including a stone wall five feet high, and about a mile from the stands a "strong paling, next a rough, high jagged hedge, and lastly a brook about six feet wide." As the runners approached that obstacle, Captain Becher led the field on Conrad, who hit the obstacle hard causing Becher to fall into the brook. As he came out of the brook, Becher is reputed to have said that "water is no damned use without brandy!" Lottery, ridden by Jem Mason, won at 9/1, followed by Seventy-Four and Paulina, both 12/1. The 6/1 favourite, The Nun, failed to finish. There were seventeen runners. That first 'National' attracted a crowd of about 50,000.

In the following years the race became very popular, though William Lynn's health suffered and his interest in racing lessened. Another member of the syndicate, Edward William Topham, who was also a racing handicapper, took over as the leading influence at Aintree. In 1843 he turned the 'National' from a weight-for-age race into a handicap. The race officially became the 'Grand National' in 1847; the following year Topham took on the lease of the course from Lord Sefton.

The Grand National, and with it Aintree racecourse grew in popularity throughout the second half of the 19th century. The 'National' was, by a long way, the most valuable and most important race in the national hunt calendar.

The 1914 Grand National was held a few months before the start of the First World War; the 1915 race was also run at Aintree but a year later Aintree was requisitioned by the War Office, so a substitute race, named the 'Racecourse Association Steeplechase' was held in 1916, 1917 and 1918 at Gatwick (on the site where the airport was later built) in Sussex. The Grand National returned to Aintree in 1919.

During the Second World War there was one race won by BOGSCAR in 1940 at Aintree as the course had been requisitioned for use as a storage depot with hundreds of servicemen from the USA being stationed there. The course opened again on 4 April 1946 for the Spring Meeting, with the Grand National being run on the Friday, the second day of the three-day meeting. It was first run on Saturday in 1947.

In 1949 Messrs. Tophams bought the racecourse outright from Lord Sefton after leasing the course for 100 years. To celebrate this purchase, the Topham Trophy, a handicap steeplechase over 2 miles 6 furlongs of the Grand National course was introduced as the main race on the first day of the National meeting.

In December 1953 the Mildmay steeplechase course was opened with smaller versions of the Grand National fences. This two-day fixture was the first all National Hunt meeting ever staged at Aintree.

In July 1964 Mrs Topham announced that she intended selling the racecourse to a property developer, Capital & Counties, to build housing. This started the era of the "last Grand National" which lasted for about twenty years. There was talk of the Grand National being transferred to Doncaster.

1973 saw the last Grand National meeting run by the Topham family as Aintree was bought by a local property developer, Bill Davies. A low ebb was reached in 1975 when the attendance at the Grand National was the lowest anyone could remember, largely because Bill Davies tripled admission prices. The National meeting was revived in 1976 under Ladbrokes' management and a new clerk of the course, John Hughes (although Bill Davies still owned the course). The first day of the Spring Meeting saw the final flat race run at Aintree, the Knowsley Stakes over 1 mile 5 furlongs; the final two days, including Grand National day were all National Hunt events. In 1977 all three days of the 'National' meeting were National Hunt for the first time, and have continued to be so.

The uncertainty about the future of the course was finally removed in December 1983 when the Jockey Club bought the course from Bill Davies.

Most of Aintree's old stands were demolished in 1985, leaving just the County Stand, which is grade II listed. A temporary stand, the Aintree Stand, was erected. The County Stand was renovated and extended in 1988. Three years later the temporary stands were replaced by a permanent one, opened by and named after the Queen Mother.

In 1993, the race was not held due to a series of false starts due to issues with the tape. One false start was not noticed by thirty of the thirty-nine runners due to the starter's flag failing to unfurl, with seven runners completing the course.

In 1995 Red Rum, the only horse to win the Grand National three times, died in October and was buried near the winning post. A statue to the horse had been unveiled at the course on Grand National day in 1988.

In 1997 part of the County Stand was demolished to prepare for a new grandstand. Also in 1997, the race was postponed to Monday because of an IRA bomb threat. In 1998 a new stand, named after the Princess Royal, was opened.

2006 saw the start of extensive re-development of the racecourse. A new parade ring, weighing room and winners' enclosure were opened. The old weighing room was turned into a wine bar and museum. A year later two further grandstands were opened, named after the Earl of Derby and Lord Sefton.

In 2015 the old weighing room and winners' enclosure were named 'McCoys' to honour the jockey A. P. McCoy, who had ridden in his final Grand National.

In 2023, the race was delayed because of the Animal Rising protesters.

In 2026, the November meeting was extended by a day, this was to add the valuable grade 2 National Hunt Steeplechase Haldon Gold Cup. This was switched from Exeter Racecourse after the Devon track failed an inspection due to firm ground. This was because of the severe drought conditions in South West England due to the 2026 UK heatwaves.

== Courses ==
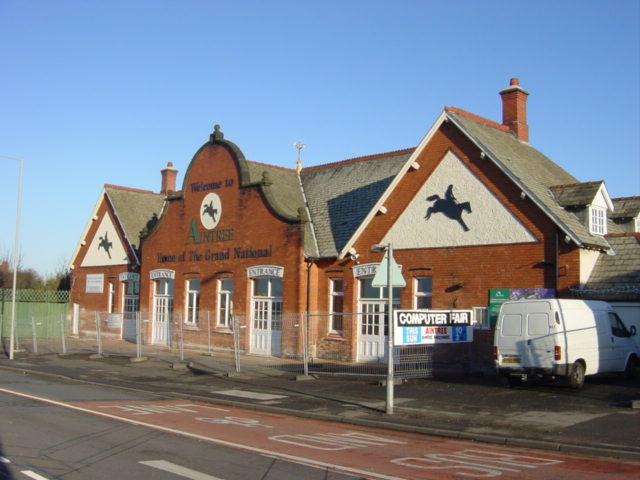
The traditional entrance

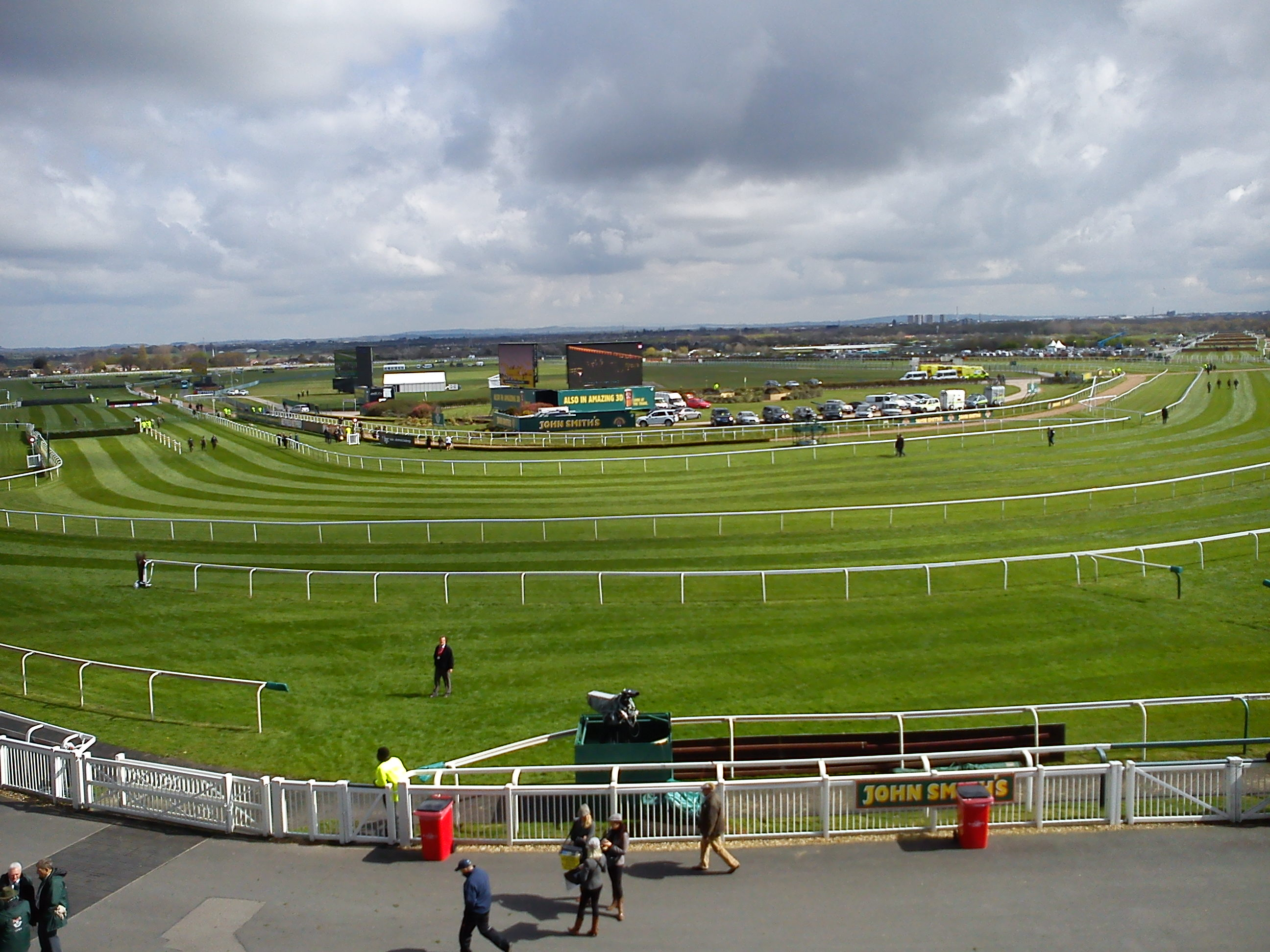
The course viewed from the stands. The Chair is visible on the far left, with the water jump in front

There are three courses at Aintree: the Grand National course, the Mildmay steeplechase course, and the Hurdles' course

=== Grand National course ===
The Grand National course is a left-handed triangular shaped course of about 2 miles 2 furlongs, with 16 fences, including three open ditches and a water jump. The fences range in height from 4 ft 6 ins to 5 ft 2 ins ('The Chair', one of the open ditches, and the largest fence on the course). Some of the fences have a drop – a lower landing side than take off side. These include Becher's Brook, the 6th and 22nd fence in the Grand National, although its drop has been reduced in recent years.

It is regarded as the most difficult of all courses to complete successfully, with the fences including obstacles such the Chair, Foinavon, Valentine's, Canal Turn and Becher's Brook. All fences bar the water jump are covered with spruce, unlike at any other course in British National Hunt racing.

Four other races take place over the National fences. These are the Topham Trophy Chase (reverting to its original name in 2002 after being known as the John Hughes Trophy Chase since 1989) and the Fox Hunters' Chase at the Grand National meeting, and the Grand Sefton Handicap Chase and Becher Chase in the December meeting.

The fences have been modified down the years to make them less severe. In 1961 all the plain fences were sloped on the take-off side. In 1990 the brooks at Becher's and Valentine's were filled in, while the landing side of Becher's was raised to reduce the drop.

In 2011 the drop on the landing side of the first fence was reduced, and the height of the fourth fence was reduced by two inches for 4 ft 10 in. In the same year the drop at Becher's was reduced again, by four to five inches.

=== Mildmay Course ===
The Mildmay Course was named in honour of Lord Mildmay (1909-1950), who was champion amateur jockey four times and rode in several Grand Nationals. He felt there should be a 'nursery' course at Aintree, with smaller versions of the 'National' fences to provide an introduction to potential future runners in the Grand National to Aintree's unique fences.

The course opened in December 1953 with a two-day Yuletide meeting. The benefit of the Mildmay course was that it enabled Aintree for the first time to stage all National Hunt cards. Previously it could hold only flat programmes or mixed meetings of flat and jumps races. The course, a left-handed oval, was a little over 1 mile 2 furlongs round, with eight fences, two of which were used in the Grand National: fence number 13 and 29 in the Grand National, which was the second of the four plain fences in the home straight on the Mildmay Course, and the water jump. There were three fences along the back straight: an open ditch, a plain fence and another open ditch. Races were run over two distances: 2 miles 80 yards, and 3 miles 1 furlong 130 yards. The course was regarded as sharp.

The course was not popular with most trainers, and the races on the Mildmay course attracted small fields. The Mildmay course was used only once at the Grand National meeting, for the Mildmay 'Chase, a race over 2 miles 80 yards for novices, on the second day of the meeting.

In 1975 Bill Davies replaced the spruce fences of the Mildmay course with standard birch fences. In 1990 the Mildmay course was changed: the water jump was no longer used, while a 'cross fence' on the bend into the home straight replaced one of the plain fences in the home straight, creating a long run between the final two fences. There were now four fences down the back straight, including an open ditch.

=== Hurdles' Course ===
The Hurdles' Course was the flat course, and is the oldest of Aintree's three courses. It is a left-handed oval of about 1 mile 3 furlongs, with sharp bends. There are six flights of hurdles: three down the back straight, three in the home straight.

The final flat race at Aintree took place on the first day of the Grand National meeting in 1976. Flat races of five furlongs were run on a straight course which ran diagonally across the centre of the Mildmay course.

On this course on 7 April 1967, on the day before the Foinavon Grand National, on his first visit to Aintree, the two-year-old Red Rum, ridden by Paul Cook, dead-heated with Curlicue in a five-furlong selling plate. The running rails for this course remained in place until 1987.

== The Grand National ==
The Grand National race was run for many years over 4 miles 856 yards (4 miles 3 furlongs 196 yards), then 4 miles 4 furlongs. In 2013 the start was moved 110 yards to keep the horses away from the noise of the crowd before the start. The distance of the race is now 4 miles 514 yards (6.907 km) after being re-measured by the British Horseracing Authority in 2015. The race is considered among the most demanding steeplechases in the world. The lead has often changed hands during the 494-yard (452 m) run-in after the final fence. There are usually 40 horses taking part in the race (this has been the maximum since 1984) but fewer than ten may actually complete the course: for example, 42 horses started in 1928, and only two reached the finishing post. The record for the most victories in the Grand National is held by Red Rum, who won three times in the 1970s, in addition to coming second twice.

=== Disruptions at the Aintree Racecourse ===
There were several disruptions at Aintree Racecourse starting with the 1993 Grand National and it was not held because of a series of false starts. The 1997 Grand National was postponed to Monday because of an IRA bomb threat which led the evacuation of 60,000 people and the 2023 Grand National was disrupted by the Animal Rising protesters.

== Aintree Racecourse fatalities ==
The UK animal rights campaign group, Animal Aid, has been monitoring fatalities at racecourses since 2007, and in that time has recorded 75 deaths at Aintree. 51 of these deaths occurred during the April Aintree Festival, 12 of which happened during the Grand National race itself. The horses who died were:

Year	Name of Horse	Cause of Death or Reason for Euthanasia
2026	Get On George (IRE)	Broke Leg - Destroyed
2026	Gold Dancer (FR)	Broke Back - Destroyed
2025	Lady Motivator (FR)	Broke Right Hind Leg - Destroyed
2025	Celebre dAllen (FR)	Collapsed - Contracted Fatal Race Related Pleuropneumonia-
2025	Willy De Houelle (FR)	Fell - Broke Neck - Dead
2024	Havana Party	Pulled Up Early In Race - Reported As Dead
2024	Sammys Guarantee	Fell - Dead
2024	Giovinco (IRE)	Fell - Injured - Destroyed
2024	Pikar (FR)	Fell - Broke Neck - Dead
2023	Tellitasitis	Injured Near-Hind Leg - Destroyed
2023	Its Unbelievable	Broke Down On Bend - Destroyed
2023	Hill Sixteen	Fell - Broke Neck - Dead
2023	Dark Raven (IRE)	Fell - Broke Hind Legs - Destroyed
2023	Hullnback	Died From Infection Caused By Racing Injury
2023	Envoye Special (FR)	Fell Running Loose - Injured - Destroyed
2022	If The Cap Fits (IRE)	Fell - Injured - Destroyed
2022	Eclair Surf (FR)	Fell - Died From Head Injuries
2022	Discorama (FR)	Pulled Up - Injured Pelvis - Destroyed
2022	Elle Est Belle	Collapsed During Race - Dead
2022	Solwara One (IRE)	Pulled Up - Injured - Destroyed
2021	Bombs Away (IRE)	Struck Into - Destroyed
2021	Justatenner	Pulled Up - Fatally Injured
2021	The Long Mile	Broke Near-Hind Leg - Destroyed
2021	Houx Gris (FR)	Fell - Ran Loose - Fatally Injured
2020	Looks Like Murt (IRE)	Broke Hind Leg - Destroyed
2019	Its Jennifer (FR)	Fell- Broke Foreleg Cannon - Destroyed
2019	Up For Review (IRE)	Brought Down - Broke Neck - Dead
2019	Forest des Aigles (FR)	Broke Foreleg Before Jumping Fence - Destroyed
2019	Crucial Role	Fell - Injured - Destroyed
2018	Positively Dylan	Fell - Fatally Injured
2018	Jump For Dough (IRE)	Hit Hurdle - Broke Foreleg - Destroyed
2018	Lilbitluso (IRE)	Fell - Injured - Destroyed
2016	Kings Palace (IRE)	Pulled Up - Lame - Destroyed
2016	Minella Reception (IRE)	Fell - Dead
2016	Gullinbursti (IRE)	Fell - Broke Neck - Dead
2016	Arzal (FR)	Injured - Destroyed
2016	Clonbanan Lad (IRE)	Pulled Up - Collapsed - Fatally Injured
2016	Marasonnien (FR)	Pulled Up - Collapsed - Fatally Injured
2015	Benefit Cut (IRE)	Fell - Fatally Injured
2015	Rajdhani Express	Broke Down - Fatally Injured
2015	Seedling	Fell - Broke Neck - Dead
2015	Balder Succes (FR)	Fell - Injured Shoulder - Destroyed
2014	Balbriggan (IRE)	Broke Down - Destroyed
2014	Timesremembered (IRE)	Fell - Injured - Destroyed
2013	Plein Pouvoir (FR)	Fell - Injured - Destroyed
2013	Little Josh (IRE)	Fell - Broke Shoulder - Destroyed
2013	Battlefront (IRE)	Collapsed and Fatally Injured
2012	Four Fiddlers (IRE)	Broke Down Injured - Euthanased
2012	Massimo (FR)	Broke Leg on Course before start - Destroyed
2012	Pirates Gold (IRE)	Pulled Up - Broke Knee - Destroyed
2012	Synchronised (IRE)	Fell - Broke Leg Running Loose - Destroyed
2012	According To Pete	Brought Down - Broke Leg - Destroyed
2012	Gottany OS	Broke Down injured - Destroyed
2011	Dooneys Gate (IRE)	Broke Back - Destroyed
2011	Ornais (FR)	Broke Neck
2011	Bible Lord (IRE)	Fell - Injured Spine - Destroyed
2011	Leos Lucky Star (USA)	Fell - Fatally Injured
2011	Inventor (IRE)	Fell - Injured Destroyed
2010	Private Be	Collapsed and Died After Race
2010	Schindlers Hunt (IRE)	Broke Foreleg - Destroyed
2010	Plaisir D Estruval (FR)	Fell - Broke Neck
2010	Baba O Curragh (FR)	Knee Injury - Destroyed
2010	Prudent Honour (IRE)	Fell - Broke Neck
2010	Pagan Starprincess	Head Injury
2009	Stellino (GER)	Pulled Up Injured - Destroyed
2009	Hear The Echo (IRE)	Collapsed & Died
2009	Lilla Sophia	Broke Leg Destroyed
2009	Moscow Catch (IRE)	Broke Neck
2009	Exotic Dancer (FR)	Heart Attack
2009	Mel In Blue (FR)	Broke Neck
2008	Genghis (IRE)	Fell - Destroyed
2008	McKelvey (IRE)	Fell-Fatal Injury Destroyed
2008	In The High Grass (IRE)	Fell-Dead
2008	Time To Sell (IRE)	Fell-Dead
2007	Graphic Approach (IRE)	Fell-pneumonia/race injury
2007	Lord Rodney (IRE)	Brought down-Fatal Injuries Destroyed
2007	Into The Shadows	Pulled up-Dead

== Notable races ==
Month	Meeting	DOW	Race Name	Type	Grade	Distance	Age/Sex
October	October Meeting	Sunday	Old Roan Chase	Chase	Grade 2	2m 4f	4yo +
November	November Meeting	Saturday	Molyneux Hurdle	Hurdle	Grade 2	2m 1f	4yo +
December	December Meeting	Saturday	Wirral Juvenile Hurdle	Hurdle	Listed	2m 1f	3yo
December	December Meeting	Saturday	Grand Sefton Handicap Chase	Chase	Handicap	2m 5½f	6yo +
December	December Meeting	Saturday	Becher Chase	Chase	Premier Hcap	3m 2f	6yo +
December	Boxing Day	Boxing Day	Formby Novices' Hurdle	Hurdle	Grade 1	2m 1f	3yo +
April	Grand National	Thursday	Anniversary 4-Y-O Juvenile Hurdle	Hurdle	Grade 1	2m 1f	4yo
April	Grand National	Thursday	Manifesto Novices' Chase	Chase	Grade 1	2m 4f	5yo +
April	Grand National	Thursday	Aintree Bowl	Chase	Grade 1	3m 1f	5yo +
April	Grand National	Thursday	Foxhunters' Open Hunters' Chase	Chase	Hunter	2m 5f	6yo +
April	Grand National	Thursday	Aintree Hurdle	Hurdle	Grade 1	2m 4f	4yo +
April	Grand National	Thursday	Red Rum Handicap Chase	Chase	Premier Hcap	2m	5yo +
April	Grand National	Thursday	Nickel Coin Mares' Std Open NH Flat	NH Flat	Grade 2	2m 1f	4-6yo
April	Grand National	Friday	William Hill Handicap Hurdle	Hurdle	Premier Hcap	2m 4f	4yo +
April	Grand National	Friday	Mildmay Novices' Chase	Chase	Grade 1	3m 1f	5yo +
April	Grand National	Friday	Top Novices' Hurdle	Hurdle	Grade 1	2m ½f	4yo +
April	Grand National	Friday	Melling Chase	Chase	Grade 1	2m 4f	5yo +
April	Grand National	Friday	Topham Chase	Chase	Premier Hcap	2m 5½f	5yo +
April	Grand National	Friday	Sefton Novices' Hurdle	Hurdle	Grade 1	3m ½f	4yo +
April	Grand National	Friday	Debenhams Handicap Hurdle	Hurdle	Handicap	2m ½f	4yo +
April	Grand National	Saturday	Maghull Novices' Chase	Chase	Grade 1	2m	5yo +
April	Grand National	Saturday	Bridle Road Handicap Hurdle	Hurdle	Premier Hcap	3m ½f	4yo +
April	Grand National	Saturday	Mersey Novices' Hurdle	Hurdle	Grade 1	2m 4f	4yo +
April	Grand National	Saturday	Freebooter Handicap Chase	Chase	Premier Hcap	3m 1f	5yo +
April	Grand National	Saturday	Liverpool Hurdle	Hurdle	Grade 1	3m ½f	4yo +
April	Grand National	Saturday	Grand National	Chase	Premier Hcap	4m 2½f	7yo +
April	Grand National	Saturday	Weatherbys nhstallions.co.uk Standard Open NH Flat	NH Flat	Grade 2	2m 1f	4-6yo

== Popular culture ==
Aintree racecourse features in Jump! a novel by Jilly Cooper.

== Other events ==
=== Motor racing ===
The 3 mile Aintree motor racing circuit

Aintree has also been used as a venue for motor racing. The British Grand Prix was staged there on five occasions, in 1955, 1957, 1959, 1961 and 1962. In addition to the Grand Prix, the circuit also held 11 non-championship Formula 1 races, known as the Aintree 200, first won by Stirling Moss in 1954 with the last winner being Jack Brabham, in April 1964.

The only driver to have competed in both horse and motor races at Aintree is Alfonso de Portago, who rode in the Grand National in 1950 and 1952 as well as driving a Ferrari 750 Monza in the Daily Telegraph International Meeting in October 1955. He was set to compete at the 1957 British Grand Prix at Aintree, but he was killed in the Mille Miglia in May of that year.

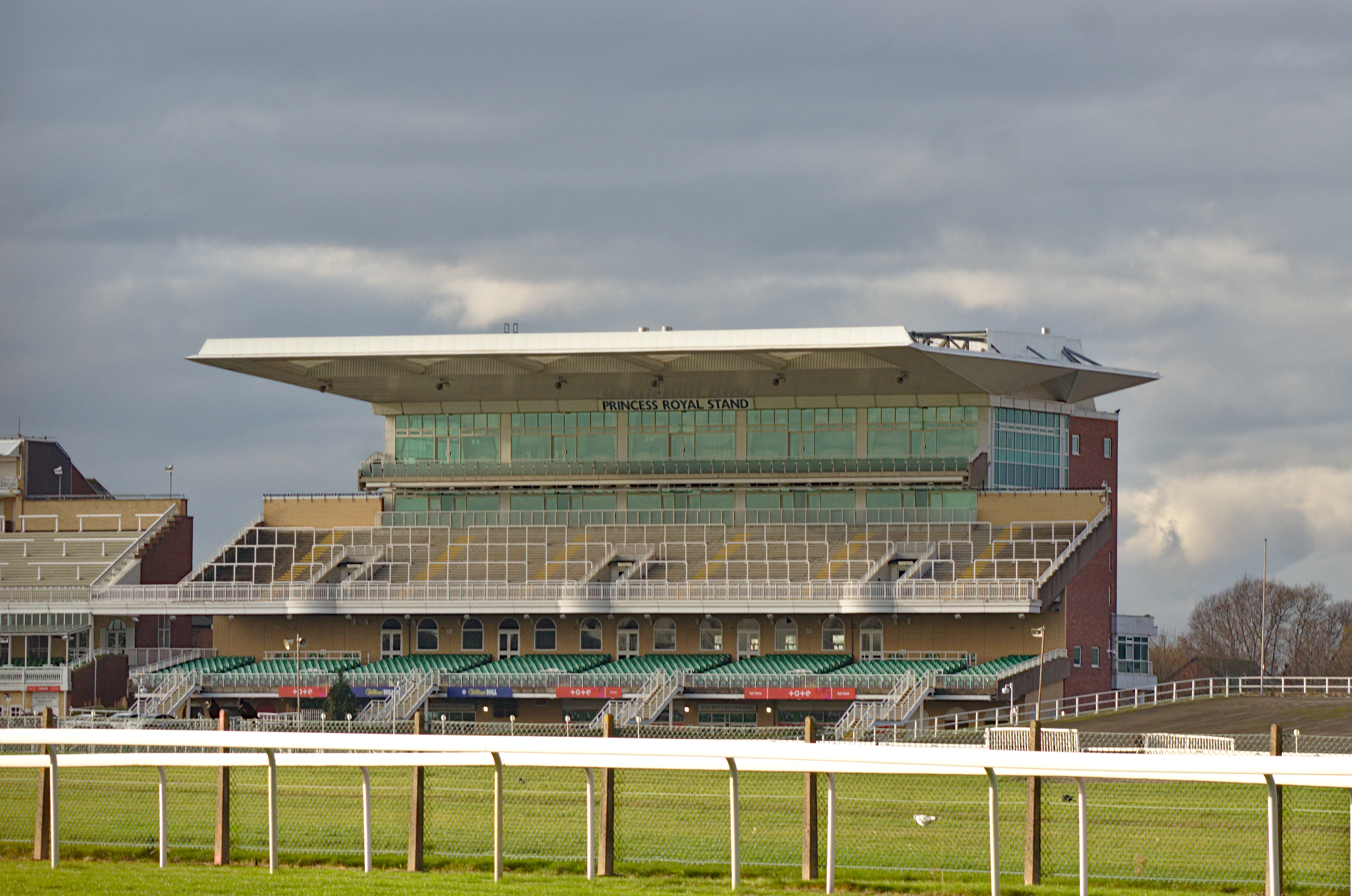
The Princess Royal Stand

=== Music ===
- Michael Jackson concluded the European leg of his 1987–1989 Bad World Tour at the venue on 11 September 1988, to 125,000 people. Also Jackson planned to perform here in 1992 during his Dangerous World Tour, but these plans were cancelled.
- P!nk performed at the venue during her I'm Not Dead Tour on 16 July 2007.
- Kaiser Chiefs and the Chemical Brothers performed in concert at Aintree Pavilion as part of Liverpool Music Week 2007.

=== Golf ===
The racecourse contains a 9-hole golf course and driving range within its boundaries. Features such as Becher's Brook are incorporated into the course. It is accessed from Melling Road, which bisects the racecourse. Because of this, the golf facilities are closed when the course is used for horse or motor racing.

=== Transport links ===
Aintree racecourse was served by two railway stations: Aintree Racecourse railway station, which opened in about 1890, and Aintree Sefton Arms, which opened in 1849. The racecourse station was last used on Grand National day, 25 March 1961, and closed a year later. Aintree Sefton Arms became Aintree in 1968 and remains open.
