= Terence Hogan =

English professional criminal (1931-1995)

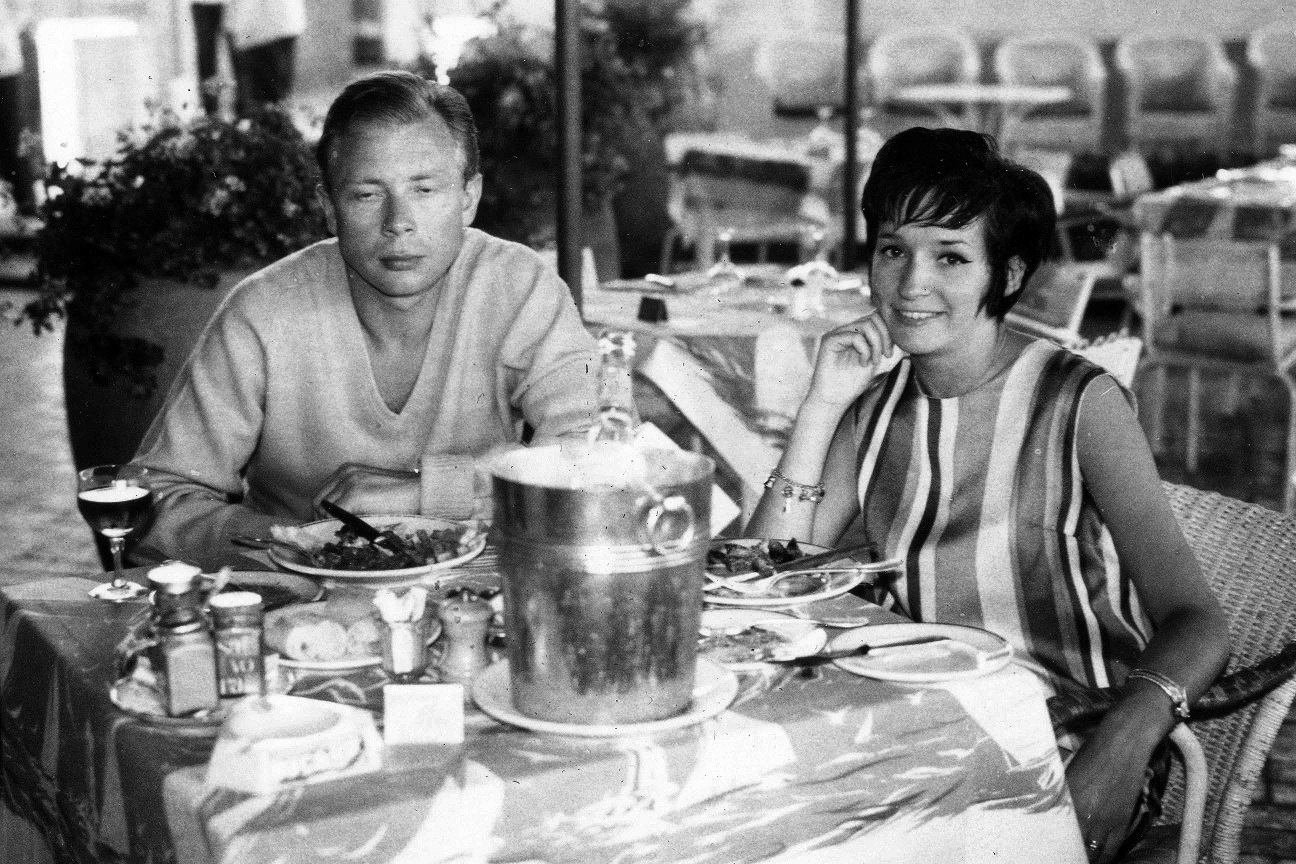
- Terence Hogan (left) in the 1950s, with his wife Rosalind (right).
- Born: 16 June 1931; London, England
- Died: 15 January 1995 (aged 63); Fulham, London, England
- Cause of death: Suicide
- Other name: "Lucky Tel"
- Occupation: Professional criminal
- Known for: Eastcastle Street robbery, Great Train Robbery of 1963
- Spouse: Rosalind
- Children: 3

Terence Hogan (16 June 1931 – 15 January 1995), also known as Terry "Lucky Tel" Hogan and Harry Booth, was an English professional criminal and notorious figure in the London underworld in the 1950s and 1960s. He took part in the 1952 Eastcastle Street mailbag robbery in which £287,000 (equivalent to £7.19 million in 2025) was stolen from a post office van leaving Paddington station. Hogan was a member of the infamous "Bowler Hat Gang", who dressed up as city gents to execute the robbery of an armoured payroll truck at London's Heathrow Airport in 1962, and a short time later, was believed to be tied to the Great Train Robbery (1963) under his alias Harry Booth.

== Early life ==
Terry Hogan was born in 1931 and grew up an abused child in poverty in Fulham. He was deaf in one ear as the result of a beating he got as a child. As a young adult he chose the path of crime to escape poverty, and earned a reputation for reliability and being able to perfect the details and timing of a robbery. While in his early twenties, he worked for notorious gang leader Billy Hill. His other associates included cat burglar and jewellery thief, George "Taters" Chatham, and fellow thief Peter Scott. They were considered "the most 'up-market' group of London's underworld at the time."

In 1957 Hogan was arrested together with Bruce Reynolds for assault and robbery of £500 from a bookmaker returning from White City Greyhounds. The police stated their belief that the intent of the cosh attack was grievous bodily harm and not robbery. Hogan was sentenced to 2½ years and Reynolds to 3½ years.

Hogan was a member of the infamous "Bowler Hat Gang", who dressed-up as city gents to execute the robbery of an armoured payroll truck at London's Heathrow Airport in 1962, and a short time later, was believed to be involved in the Great Train Robbery (1963).

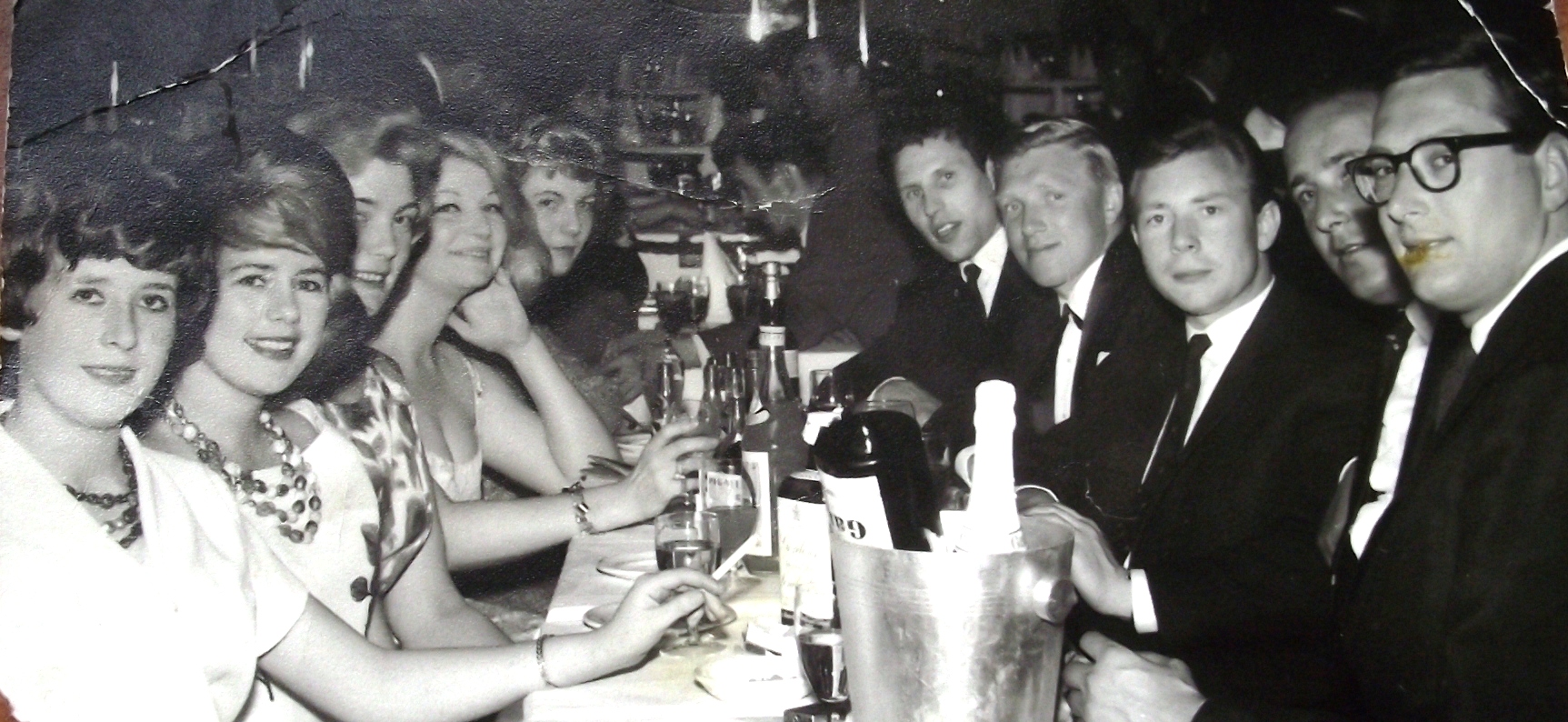
(1951) R to L: Bruce Reynolds, John "Paddy" Daly, Terry Hogan, Michael Ball (a driver on the Heathrow Airport Robbery, but not a Great Train Robber), and Charlie Wilson (criminal). All (of the men) took part in the Heathrow Airport Robbery.

== Eastcastle Street robbery ==
The Eastcastle Street robbery occurred on 21 May 1952 near Oxford Street in London. Seven masked men held up a post office van, and escaped with £287,000 (estimated 2014 worth, £7,380,000). Billy Hill, a notorious London gangster, was the mastermind behind the plan, and Terry Hogan was one of the robbers. The robbery was considered by police to have set a milestone in a new era of "project" crime because unlike the "smash-and-grab" style robberies of the time, the Eastcastle Street robbery involved meticulous planning, and staged rehearsals under the guise of a crime movie production.

The robbery garnered the attention of then prime minister Winston Churchill who received daily updates on the investigation. Parliament demanded an explanation from then Postmaster General, Earl de la Warr, as to how such a crime could have happened. A reward of £25,000 (US$33,862.50) was offered and a massive police search ensued. The robbers were described as "aged about 20, probably ex-Borstal boys, expert motor-drivers". Neither the money nor the robbers were ever found.

In the early 1950s, Bruce Reynolds worked with a fellow thief he identified only as Harry during an interview. Captioned photographs of "Harry" with Reynolds, taken during the 1950s / early 1960s, within Bruce Reynolds' autobiography Anatomy of a Thief are undoubtedly photographs of Terry Hogan. Anecdotal evidence indicates Harry may have been Harry Booth, the alias used by Terry Hogan`. Reynolds said: ""He had been involved in the Eastcastle Street mailbag job, the first major post-war theft when £287,000 was stolen from a post office van on May 21, 1952". In 1995, Reynolds read Hogan's eulogy at his funeral, and referenced the Eastcastle Street robbery saying, "He was a major face, he was one of Billy Hill's young men, groomed for stardom. That robbery more or less shaped the mould." Taters Chatham said Hogan had entered the cab of the mail van and was fortunate to have never been caught.

The robbery was mentioned in the Alexander Mackendrick film, The Ladykillers. The BBC One Show had a section devoted to Terence Hogan which was filmed at the Star Tavern, Belgravia, London, with Terence Hogan's daughter.

== Later career ==
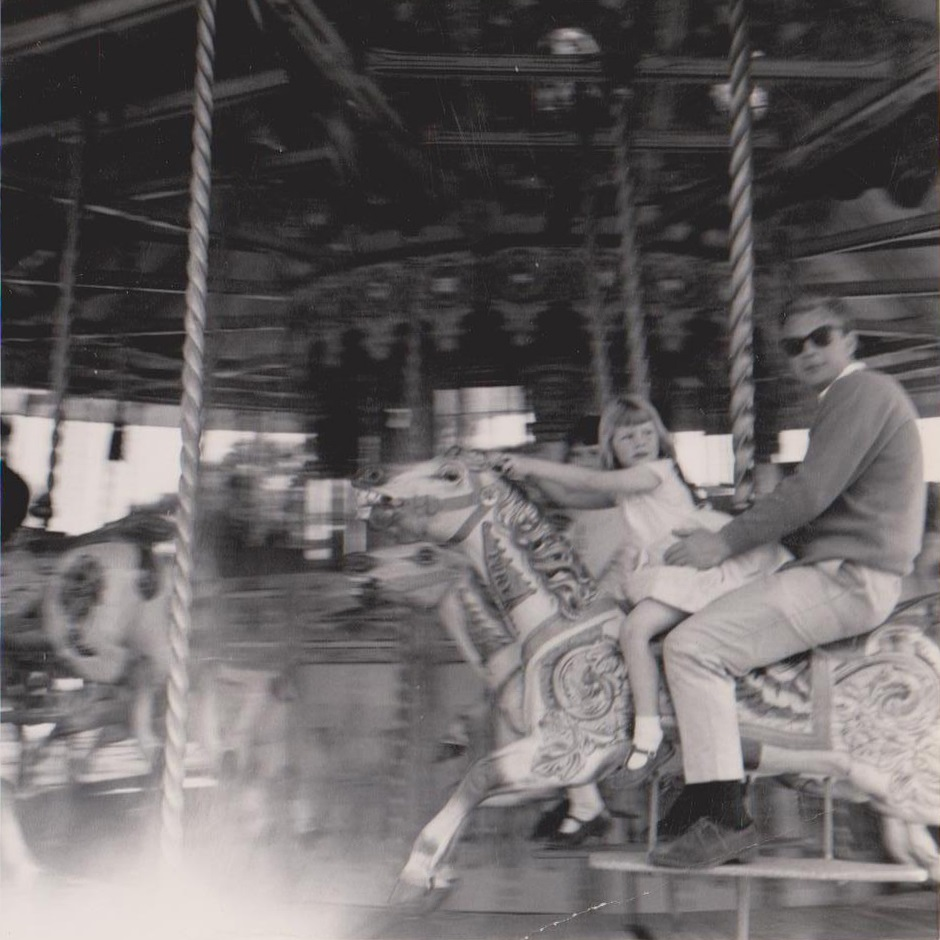
(1964) Hogan with his daughter Karen at Battersea Fun Fair, London UK

In 1962, Hogan was involved in the robbery of an armoured payroll truck at Heathrow Airport, in which £62,000 (US$84,080.45) was stolen.

In The Guardian (1995), Duncan Campbell wrote that on the day the Great Train Robbery (1963) took place, "Hogan was in Cannes with a family of French–Iranian millionaires. It would not take Sherlock Holmes to deduce he had been told another major robbery was about to happen - and an alibi might be advisable." Early police investigations, including file DPP 2/3588 which is closed until 2045, name Terence Hogan among the suspected robbers who took part in the 1963 train robbery, along with Bruce Reynolds, Ronald Edwards, Gordon Goody, John Daly, Michael Ball, Charles Wilson, and Joseph Hartfield.

== Life after crime ==
Hogan left his life of crime in the early 1960s, married, and had three children. He worked in a respectable line of work in the textile industry. His alcohol use increased over time, and while he doted over his children, he was described as never having found true happiness. Hogan committed suicide on 15 January 1995 by jumping out of a window on the top storey of his flat. Bruce Reynolds considered Hogan his mentor, and admitted, "Most of the major crimes of the time [Hogan] was involved in."
