= 1965 Grand National =

English steeplechase horse race

- Grand National
- Location: Aintree Racecourse
- Date: 27 March 1965
- Winning horse: (United States) Jay Trump
- Starting price: 100/6
- Jockey: (United States) Tommy Smith
- Trainer: (England) Fred Winter
- Owner: Mrs. Mary Stevenson

- 1965 Grand National in full BBC Sport
- Highlights of the 1965 Grand National (British Pathé)

Jay Trump on the far side, Freddie on the stand side, it's a desperate thing between these two. Freddie is still making ground. Freddie is making ground but Jay Trump is holding him. Jay Trump's still holding him and at the line he's just gonna win it. Jay Trump is the winner!

— BBC Commentator Peter O'Sullevan describes the climax of the 1965 National

The 1965 Grand National was the 119th running of the Grand National horse race that took place at Aintree Racecourse near Liverpool, England, on 27 March 1965.

It was won by Jay Trump, trained by Fred Winter and ridden by American amateur jockey Tommy Smith. Forty-seven horses ran; the favourite, Freddie, came a close second. The race was attended by Queen Elizabeth The Queen Mother, whose horse Devon Loch almost won the National in 1956, and Princess Margaret.

== Finishing order ==
Position	Name	Jockey	Age	Handicap (st-lb)	SP	Distance
1	Jay Trump	Tommy Smith	8	11-5	100/6	
2	Freddie	Pat McCarron	8	11-10	7/2	
3	Mr Jones	Chris Collins	10	11-5	50/1	
4	Rainbow Battle	George Milburn	9	10-13	50/1	
5	Vultrix	David Nicholson	7	11-1	100/6	
6	L'Empereur	John Ciechanowski	11	10-13	100/1	
7	The Rip	Bill Rees	10	11-5	9/1	
8	Loving Record	Ben Hannon	11	11-0	33/1	
9	Tant Pis	John Alder	10	10-13	40/1	
10	Brown Diamond	Bill McLernon	10	10-13	50/1	
11	April Rose	Piers Bengough	10	10-13	100/1	
12	Culleenhouse	Terry Biddlecombe	11	10-13	25/1	
13	Peacetown	Peter Pickford	11	11-0	25/1	
14	Moyrath	Basil Richmond	12	10-13	100/1	Last to complete

== Non-finishers ==
Fence	Name	Jockey	Age	Handicap (st-lb)	Starting price	Fate
26	Rondetto	Jeff King	9	11-6	100/8	Fell
6	Forgotten Dreams	Bobby Coonan	11	11-0	22/1	Fell
22	Kapeno	David Dick	8	11-6	100/8	Fell
1	Ayala	Stan Mellor	11	10-13	50/1	Fell
19	Time	Brough Scott	10	10-13	40/1	Fell
10	Dark Venetian	Jim Renfree	10	10-13	100/1	Fell
4	Red Tide	Johnny Haine	8	10-13	33/1	Fell
24	Pontin-Go	Johnny Lehane	13	10-13	50/1	Fell
18	Leedsy	Willie Robinson	7	10-13	18/1	Fell
3	Ronald's Boy	Gay Kindersley	8	11-1	100/1	Fell
17	Bold Biri	Michael Scudamore	9	10-13	100/1	Fell
9	Groomsman	Duke of Alburquerque	10	10-13	100/1	Fell
28	Blonde Warrior	David Crossley-Cooke	13	10-13	100/1	Baulked
6	Nedsmar	John Hudson	11	10-13	100/1	Fell
25	Black Spot	Johnny Gamble	8	10-13	100/1	Pulled up
28	Lizawake	George Hartigan	12	10-13	100/1	Pulled up
30	Reproduction	Robin Langley	12	10-13	40/1	Pulled up
23	Leslie	Peter Jones	9	10-13	33/1	Baulked
16	Sword Flash	Tim Ryan	12	10-13	100/1	Pulled up
22	Vulcano	Tommy Carberry	7	10-13	50/1	Pulled up
28	Quintin Bay	Pat Taaffe	9	10-13	25/1	Pulled up
8	Solonace	Roy Jones	13	10-13	100/1	Refused
4	Cutlette	Mick Roberts	8	10-13	50/1	Pulled up
16	Mr McTaffy	Tommy Jackson	13	10-13	100/1	Pulled up
6	Barleycroft	Phil Harvey	10	10-13	100/1	Brought down
13	Phebu	James Morrissey	8	10-13	33/1	Brought down
6	Ruby Glen	Steve Davenport	10	10-13	33/1	Brought down
6	Sizzle-On	Pat Hurley	9	10/13	100/1	Brought down
6	Crobeg	Macer Gifford	12	10-13	100/1	Brought down
8	Coleen Star	Johnny Leech	11	10-13	100/1	Refused
22	Ballygowan	Tony Redmond	11	10-13	66/1	Refused
4	Fearless Cavalier	Ray West	14	10-13	100/1	Refused
12	French Cottage	Bill Tellwright	13	10-13	100/1	Refused

== Media coverage ==
David Coleman presented Grand National Grandstand on the BBC. Peter O'Sullevan, Bob Haynes and Peter Montague-Evans were the commentators - Montague-Evans doing his final National commentary.
