= Taters Chatham =

British thief (1912–1997)

- Born: George Henry Chatham; 3 April 1912; Fulham, London, England
- Died: 5 June 1997 (aged 85); Battersea, London, England
- Occupations: Thief and burglar
- Years active: 1931–1993
- Notable work: Theft of the Duke of Wellington's swords from the Victoria & Albert Museum (1948) and theft of Lord Nelson's jewelled chelengk from the National Maritime Museum (1951)
- Criminal charges: Theft and burglary
- Penalty: 35 years' imprisonment over his career

George Henry "Taters" Chatham (3 April 1912 – 5 June 1997) was a British thief and burglar. Born to a middle-class family, he aspired to become a professional footballer but despite a trial at Queen's Park Rangers, nothing came of it. Chatham turned to crime and was first convicted of theft in 1931. By the end of that decade he was burgling the houses of wealthy Londoners, carefully selecting his targets from society magazines. His calm-headedness led to his nickname from the Cockney rhyming slang for cold.

After the Second World War Chatham became more prolific. His crimes included the theft of two jewelled swords, awarded to the Duke of Wellington, from the Victoria & Albert Museum and a jewelled chelengk, awarded to Lord Nelson, from the National Maritime Museum. Chatham gambled away most of the proceeds from his crimes, often in the casino of London gangster Billy Hill. He was part of Hill's gang that carried out the 1952 Eastcastle Street robbery on a Post Office van. In 1957 he began a 30-year association with fellow thief Peter Scott.

Chatham's gambling led him to become increasingly reckless later in his career, though he was a famous cat burglar by the late 1950s and his raids on art galleries were attributed to a sophisticated international gang of art thieves. Chatham remained active late in life carrying out thefts and burglaries well into his 70s; his last crime was an attempted theft from an art gallery at the age of 81.

== Early life ==
George Henry Chatham was born in Fulham, London, on 3 April 1912. He was the son of George Chatham, who was then a coffee house waiter, and his wife Jenny (née Hewson). Chatham's father came from a middle-class background and had formerly been a civil engineer. George Henry Chatham aspired to a career as a professional footballer; he played for England Schoolboys and had a trial at Queen's Park Rangers but was not asked to join the team.

== Career in crime ==
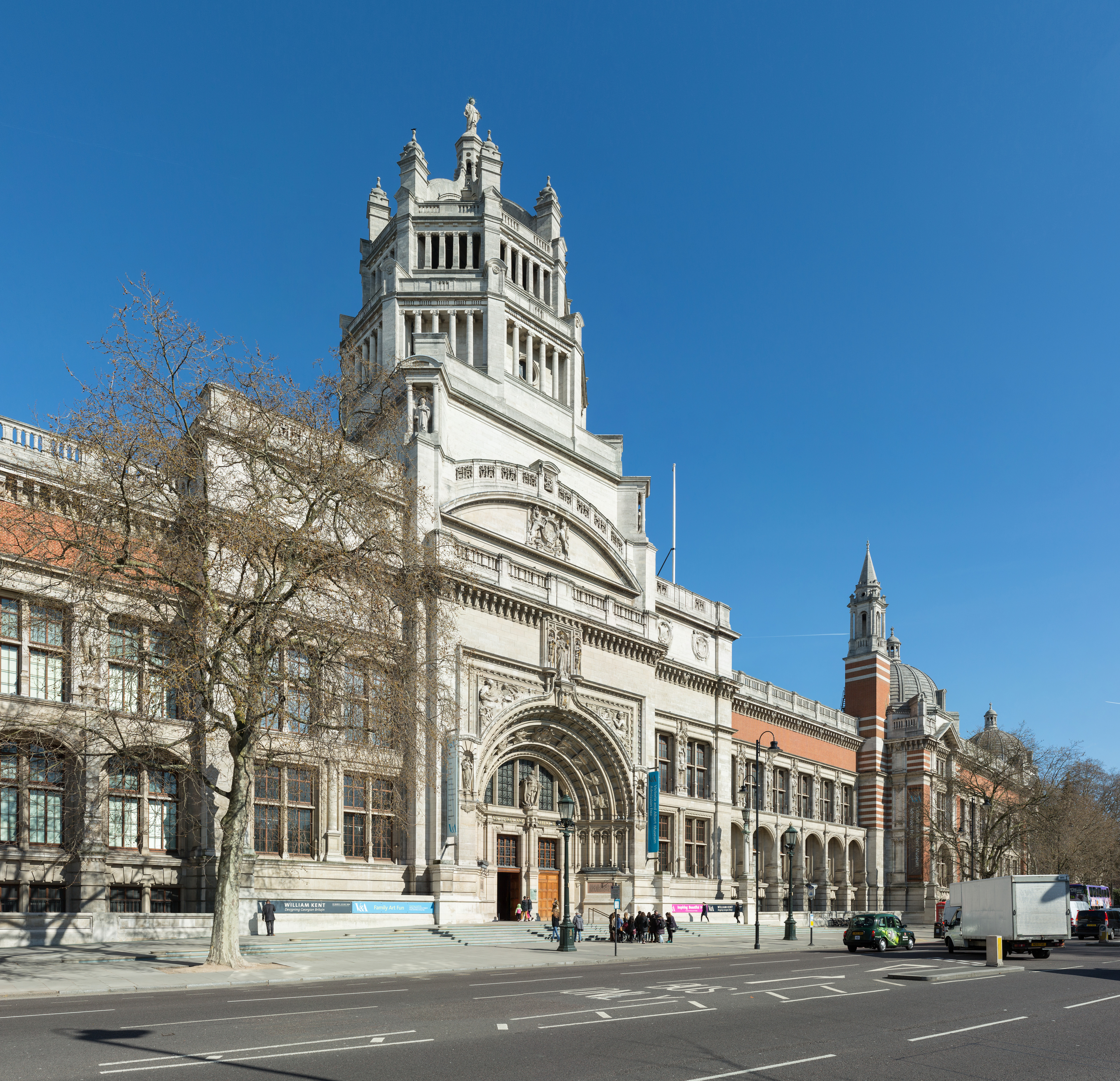
The Victoria & Albert Museum

George Henry Chatham was first convicted in 1931 and was sentenced to three years' imprisonment for theft. He married Elsa Johanne on 2 March 1935, stating his occupation on the marriage certificate as "hardware salesman". By the end of the 1930s he was a burglar, targeting the London town houses of the wealthy, and often using the London smog for cover. Chatham carefully planned his earlier burglaries, researching his targets in Burke's Peerage, Country Life and Tatler and receiving tip-offs from insurance clerks and aristocrats. His calm-headedness led to his nickname, from the Cockney rhyming slang for cold ("taters in the mould"). Chatham's only daughter was killed in Norway during the Second World War.

In the post-war years Chatham became more prolific, becoming known as "Britain’s busiest jewel thief". He enjoyed reading reports of his robberies in the press.

In 1948 he committed his most famous crime, the theft of two jewel-encrusted ceremonial swords from the Victoria & Albert Museum. Chatham used two ladders tied together to reach a 40-foot (12 m) high window to access the museum. The swords had belonged to the Duke of Wellington; one commemorated his victories in India and the other was a gift from Russian Tsar Alexander I. The swords, which were never recovered, had an estimated value of £5 million in 1997 (equivalent to £9,856,331 in 2025). This was his first theft of several from the museum and Chatham was never convicted for it. By this point Chatham was a gambling addict and many of the jewels he stole were lost at casinos; on one occasion he prised a jewel from a sword hilt whilst sitting at a card table to make a wager. He lost other jewels im betting on horse races or as gifts to girlfriends.

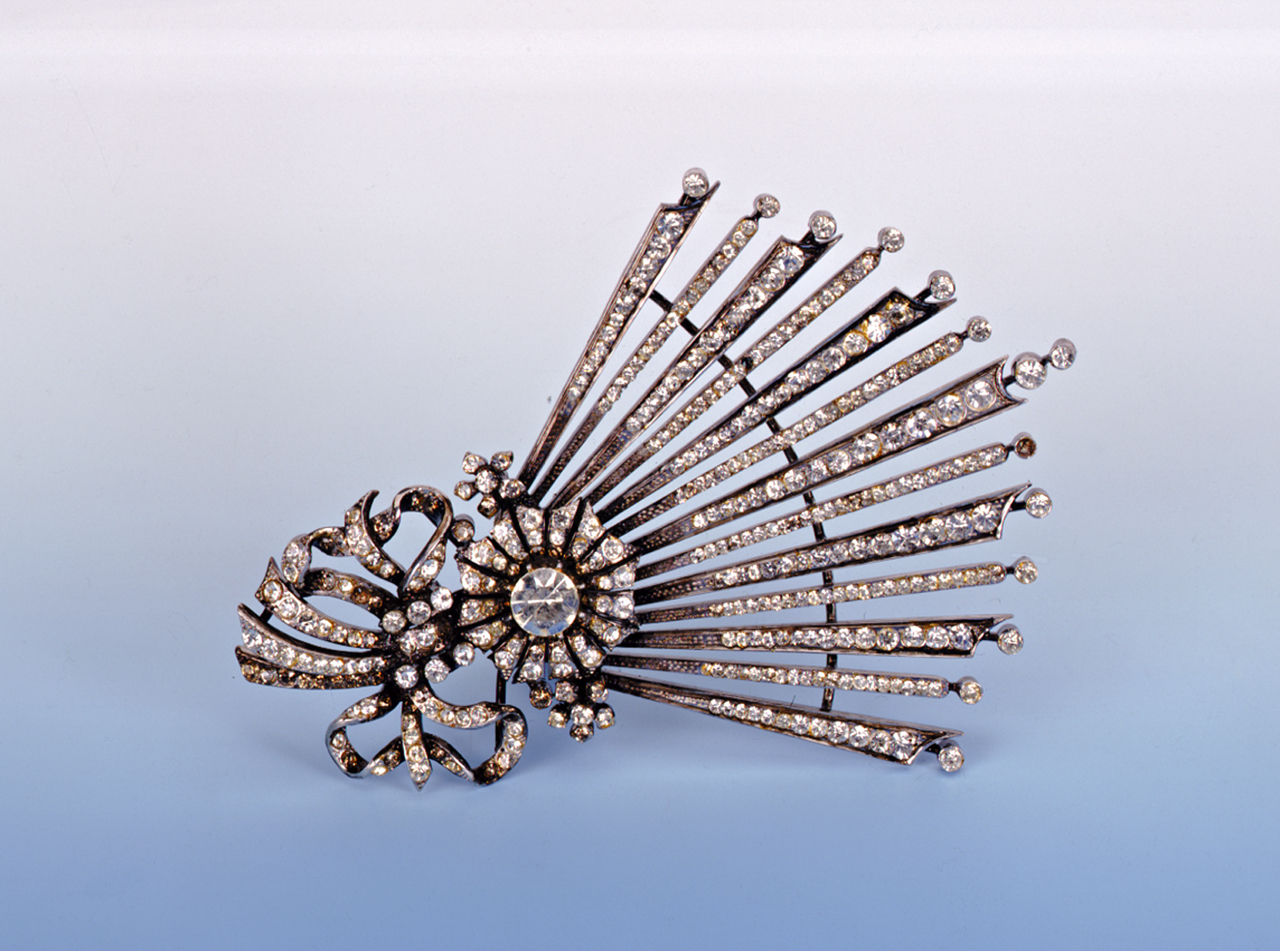
A replica of Nelson's chelengk

In 1951 Chatham broke into the National Maritime Museum in Greenwich and stole a jewelled chelengk. The chelengk had been presented to the British admiral Horatio Nelson by the Sultan of the Ottoman Empire for his victory over the French at the 1798 Battle of the Nile. The 300-diamond piece was sold by Chatham for just a few thousand pounds and was never recovered.

Chatham became associated with the gangster Billy Hill and often lost large amounts of money at his rigged casino tables. He took part in the 1952 Eastcastle Street robbery, his first armed robbery. The six-man gang the six robbers escaped with £287,000 (equivalent to £7,189,838 in 2025) from a van after assaulting three Post Office employees. Chatham's share came to £15,000 (equivalent to £375,776 in 2025) which he quickly lost on Hill's tables. He made an attempt to recover the money from Hill's safe and, although caught, escaped punishment as Hill knew he would return to the casino to lose more money. On another occasion Chatham threatened to shoot Hill.

Gambling losses made Chatham increasingly reckless; he had a reputation for losing all his money at a casino before leaving and returning, minutes later, with freshly stolen collateral. Sometimes he would break into one expensive house and, if he found nothing worth taking, would then break into the house next door. A friend described Chatham as the "Attila the Hun of the pillaging game".

Chatham was imprisoned many times and was said to have had a prison cell named in his honour. He successfully escaped from Brixton Prison and, while attempting to evade capture, severely wounded a police officer with a jemmy. During one spell of imprisonment in 1957 he met fellow thief and gambling addict Peter Scott, beginning a 30-year association between the men.

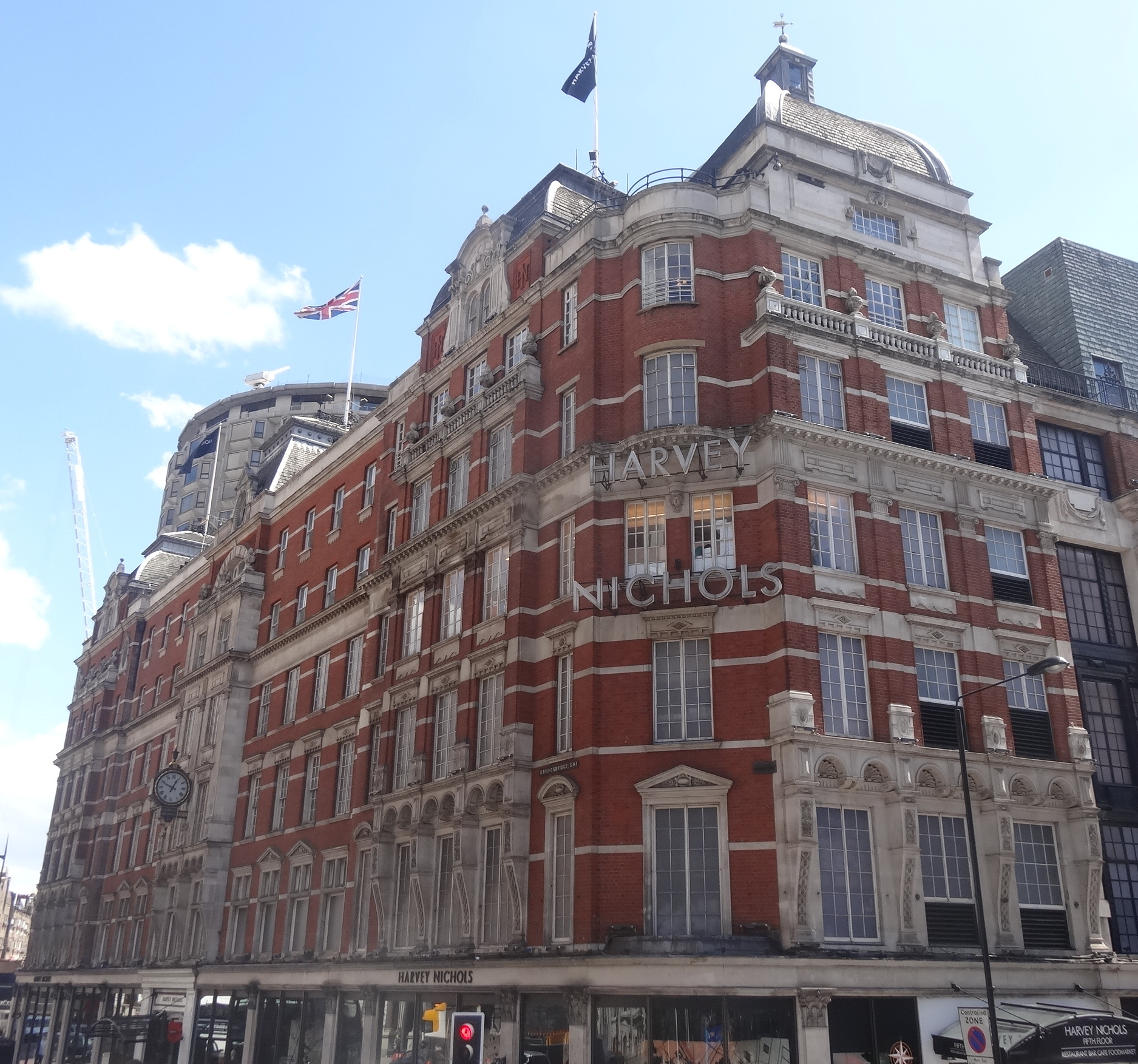
Harvey Nichols, London

By the late 1950s Chatham was regarded as the most famous cat burglar in London. Together with Scott he stole millions of pounds worth of goods from jewellery stores in Bond Street and art galleries in Mayfair. Chatham once stole several hundreds of thousands of pounds of furs from Harvey Nichols, accessing the shop by its roof. He participated in at least 26 raids on art galleries, sometimes stealing paintings to order. He sold a Matisse he stole for just £7,500 and a Renoir for £5,000. Chatham undertook many of his raids alone and armed only with "a bit of wire and a knowledge of how to bend glass doors", but the contemporary media attributed many of his raids to a sophisticated international gang of art thieves.

Chatham also continued to be involved in domestic burglary, with targets including Madame Prunier and Raymond Bessone. He took £80,000 from the Maharaja of Jaipur's safe in his home at East Grinstead and was persuaded to return a fur coat taken from Lady Rothermere by an editorial in one of her husband's newspapers. Chatham was hospitalised for six weeks after falling from the fourth-storey-high roof of the home of the Countess of Dartmouth. He returned to burglary whilst still recovering and was caught by a maid in a house whilst still swathed in bandages and sporting a cast. Chatham said "I was a rebel against authority and I had no respect for the police. If I could outwit them in any way, I would ... They were usually very, very rich people, millionaires. Some of them regarded it as a nice thing to talk about at dinner parties."

Chatham was convicted for the theft of £37,000 from the safe at the H. A. Byworth and Co jewellery factory in Mayfair after he was apprehended in the course of a domestic burglary. The police found Chatham in possession of a piece of rope identical to one left at the factory and linked dust on his comb to that found in the safe. Chatham was sentenced to 10 years' imprisonment for the theft.

== Later life ==
Chatham remained a thief into his later years, being caught stealing furs in his 60s and attempting a rooftop burglary on the Victoria & Albert Museum at the age of 70, the latter attempt being abandoned due to a blizzard. He was arrested during another theft at the age of 73, having scaled a 50-foot (15 m) tall building. At the age of 76 he was caught shoplifting a piece of bone china from Harvey Nichols and was sentenced to six months' imprisonment. His last crime was an attempted theft from an art gallery, during which he slipped and fell, when aged 81.

Despite his high-profile crimes Chatham lived in poverty in his later years, in a dilapidated ground floor flat in Fulham. He made an unsuccessful attempt at writing an autobiography and was interviewed for the BBC documentary series The Underworld in 1994. Chatham died from motor neuron disease in a Battersea nursing home on 5 June 1997; he was penniless at the time of his death. His wife had predeceased him. Shortly after his death a death mask was cast by the sculptor Nick Reynolds. At the time of his death it was estimated that he had stolen goods worth £100 million (equivalent to £197,126,616 in 2025) during his criminal career and been sentenced to a total of 35 years' imprisonment.
