= Eastcastle Street robbery =

1952 robbery in London, England

Coordinates: 51.5165°N 0.1383°W

The Eastcastle Street robbery was the holdup of a Post Office van in London in May 1952 which, at the time, was Britain's largest postwar robbery. The robbers escaped with £287,000 (estimated to be worth, in 2025, approximately £7,190,000).

It occurred around 4:20 a.m. on Wednesday 21 May in Eastcastle Street just off Oxford Street, central London, when seven masked men held up a post office van. The robbers used two cars to sandwich the van. The first car emerged slowly from a side street causing the van to slow down, the second car then pulled up alongside. The driver and two attendants were dragged out and coshed and the van was stolen. It was later found abandoned near Regent's Park; 18 of the 31 mailbags were missing. It was found that the van's alarm bell had been tampered with.

The robbery heralded the start of the 'project' (i.e. a carefully planned and executed) crime. The mastermind behind the raid was London gangster Billy Hill and the robbers included George "Taters" Chatham and Terry "Lucky Tel" Hogan.

Prime Minister Winston Churchill demanded daily updates on the police investigation and the Postmaster General, Earl de la Warr, was required to report to the Parliament of the United Kingdom on what had gone wrong. Yet, despite the involvement of over 1,000 police officers, no one was ever caught.

== In popular culture ==
The plot of Alexander Mackendrick's 1955 comedy film The Ladykillers references the robbery, which was still unsolved at the time, and implies that the characters had a hand in it. Coincidentally, a film made the year prior to the incident, The Lavender Hill Mob showed a Bank of England bullion van being waylaid in a very similar manner.

== See also ==
- List of heists in the United Kingdom
