= Maryland Hunt Cup =

American steeplechase horse race

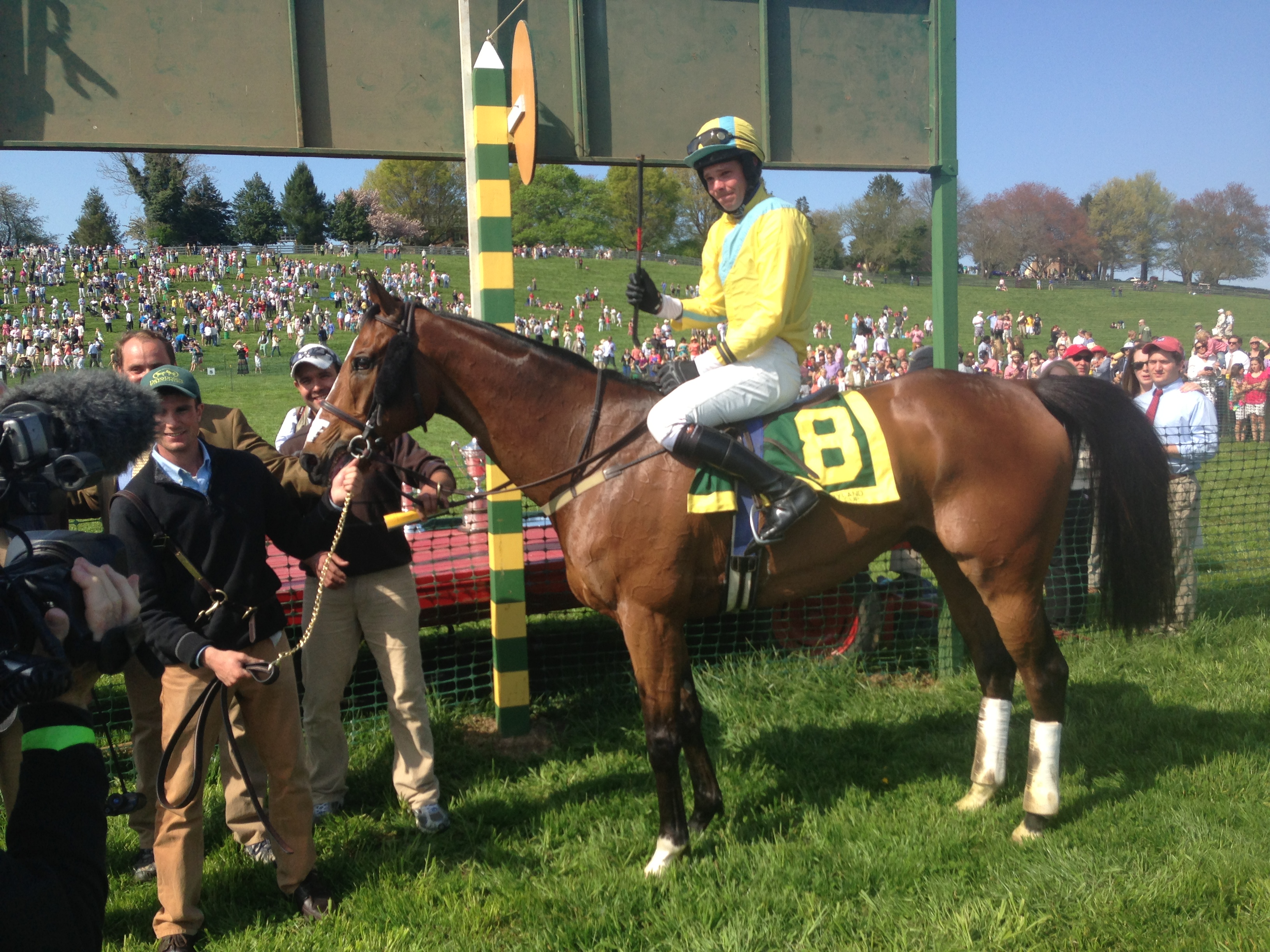
Win Picture of 2013 Maryland Hunt Cup winner Professor Maxwell, Mark Beecher aboard.

The Maryland Hunt Cup is a Timber race, which is an American Steeplechase. It was first run on May 26 1894 and won by Johnny Miller. Eight horses have won the race three times but no horse has won it four times. It is considered one of the most difficult steeplechase races in the world. Fred Winter, a famous English horse trainer who attended Jay Trump's 1966 race, was asked about bringing a horse over for the Maryland Hunt Cup, he responded "Why I wouldn't dare!" Two undefeated winners, Jay Trump (1963, 1964 and 1966) and Ben Nevis II (1977, 1978), went on to win the Grand National in England. Both horses are in the Hall of Fame.

The Maryland Hunt Cup is four miles long with 22 timber fences. Its permanent home is in Worthington Valley, Maryland. The 2013 edition of the race was the 117th running of the Maryland Hunt Cup. The race has been run each year since 1894, except for three years during the Second World War, 1943 – 1945, and 2020, when the race was not held because of the COVID-19 pandemic.

The 127th running of the race took place on Saturday, April 27, 2024. It is now held on the last Saturday of April.

== History ==
Fence six of the Maryland Hunt Cup, 4-foot nine inches of solid timber.

The Maryland Hunt Cup was established in 1894 as a contest between two hunts, The Elkridge Fox Hunting Club and the Green Spring Fox Hunting Club, to determine the relative merits of the local hunting horses. In the first running of the race, the riders and owners had to come from either of the two hunt clubs. A year later the race was opened up to horses owned and ridden by members of any recognized Hunt Club in Maryland. In 1903 this was further expanded to horses owned and ridden by members of any Hunt Club in North America. Nowadays, there are no restrictions on where the horse and rider come from. Throughout its history, the Maryland Hunt Cup has been limited to amateur jockeys.

In the late 1970s, women were allowed to ride in the race for the first time. The first female amateur jockey to win the race was Joy Slater on Cancottage in 1981. To prove this was no fluke, Slater and Cancottage repeated in 1982. Since then, other female riders to win this race included Blythe Miller and Anne Moran.

In 1922, a permanent location for the Maryland Hunt Cup was established in Worthington Valley, where it remains to this day. Prior to this date, the race was run at a variety of locations.

The Maryland Hunt Cup is a timber race, which is a steeplechase run over solid timber fences. This form of steeplechasing is unique to North America. The timber fences mimic the hunt country over which many of these horses are prepared. The Maryland Hunt Cup is part of a series of timber races run in Maryland in the Spring, which also includes My Lady's Manor (second Saturday in April), and the Grand National (third Saturday in April). The Maryland Hunt Cup is known for the size of its timber fences, some of which are close to 5 feet tall. The third fence (4 feet and six inches) and 16th fence (4 feet and ten inches) are particularly challenging.

== Rivalry ==
During the 1960s, two horses dominated the Maryland Hunt Cup, Mountain Dew and Jay Trump. In 1962 Mountain Dew won the race, only to finish second the following year to Jay Trump. In 1964, Jay Trump was a repeat winner and Mountain Dew was again second. In 1965, Jay Trump went to England and won the English Grand National, which allowed Mountain Dew to regain his Maryland Hunt Cup crown. Jay Trump returned to the Maryland Hunt Cup in 1966 and won his third Cup, Mountain Dew was runner-up again. Jay Trump was retired after his 1966 victory, which allowed Mountain Dew the opportunity to win his third Cup in 1967, which he did. The rivalry between the two horses was not limited to the Maryland Hunt Cup. Mountain Dew also won six Grand National Point to Points (1962, 1963, 1965, 1966, 1967 and 1968), Jay Trump was second to Mountain Dew in this race in 1963 and 1966. Jay Trump won the 1964 edition of the Grand National Point to Point, Mountain Dew was third in that race. In the My Lady's Manor, the first of the three race timber series, Jay Trump won the 1964 and 1966 editions. In 1964 his rival, Mountain Dew, was second.

== Records ==
Leading horse:

- Most wins, 3: Garry Owen (1901, 1902, 1907), Princeton (1903, 1905, 1906), Blockade (1938, 1939, 1940), Winton (1942, 1946, 1947), Pine Pep (1949, 1950, 1952), Mountain Dew (1962, 1965, 1967), Jay Trump (1963, 1964, 1966), Cancottage (1980, 1981, 1983), Senior Senator (2016, 2018, 2019)
- Most starts, 8: The Squire (1894, 1895, 1896, 1897, 1898 (1), 1899, 1900, 1904), Mountain Dew (1961, 1962 (1), 1963, 1964, 1965 (1), 1966, 1967 (1), 1968)

Leading jockey:

- 6 wins: Mikey Smithwick (1948, 1949, 1950, 1952, 1954, 1960)
- 5 wins: Jervis Spencer Jr. (1901, 1902, 1907, 1915, 1919), Crompton "Tommy Smith" (1959, 1961, 1963, 1964, 1966) Charles Fenwick Jr. (1977, 1978, 1979, 1983, 1987)

Time:

- The current course record is 8:15 set by Vintage Vinnie in 2022.
- Jay Trump and Ben Nevis II, both undefeated winners of the Maryland Hunt Cup that went on to win the English Grand National, set course records during one of their Maryland Hunt Cup triumphs.
