= Bouffant =

Type of hairstyle

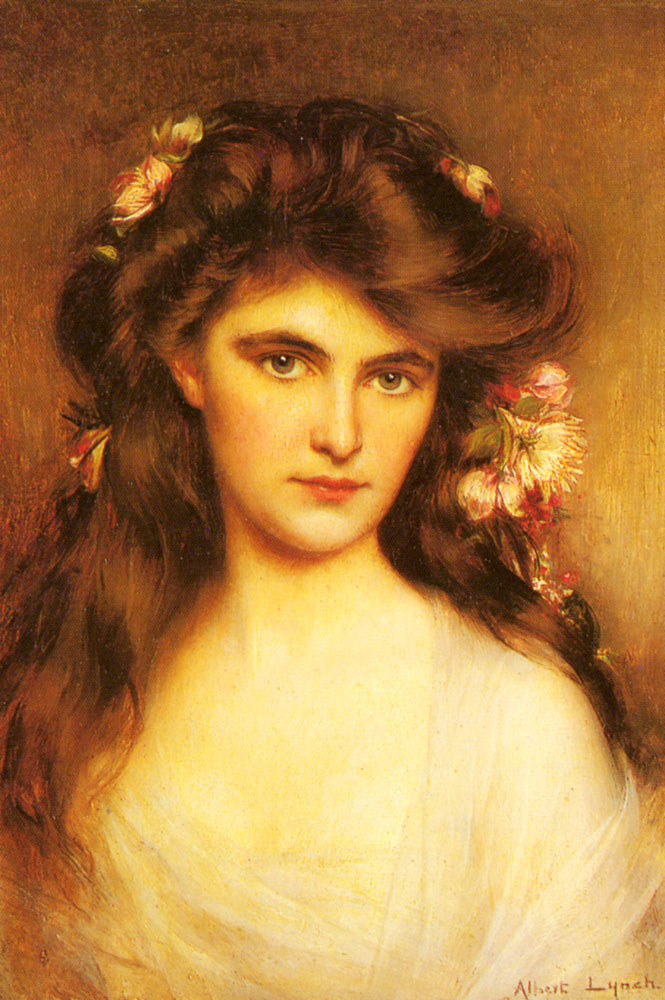
Albert Lynch, A Young Beauty With Flowers in Her Hair, oil on panel

A bouffant (/buːˈfɒnt/ boo-FONT) is a type of puffy, rounded hairstyle characterized by hair raised high on the head and usually covering the ears or hanging down on the sides.

== Etymology ==
The word bouffant has its etymological origin in the French word bouffante, which is the present participle of the French verb bouffer, meaning to puff or fluff up. In Spanish, it can be translated as "esponjar" or "mullir". The bouffant was also known in England during the 1960s as teasy-weasy, as that was the popular name for Raymond Bessone, a British stylist credited with the revival of the bouffant hairstyle in the 1950s.

== History ==
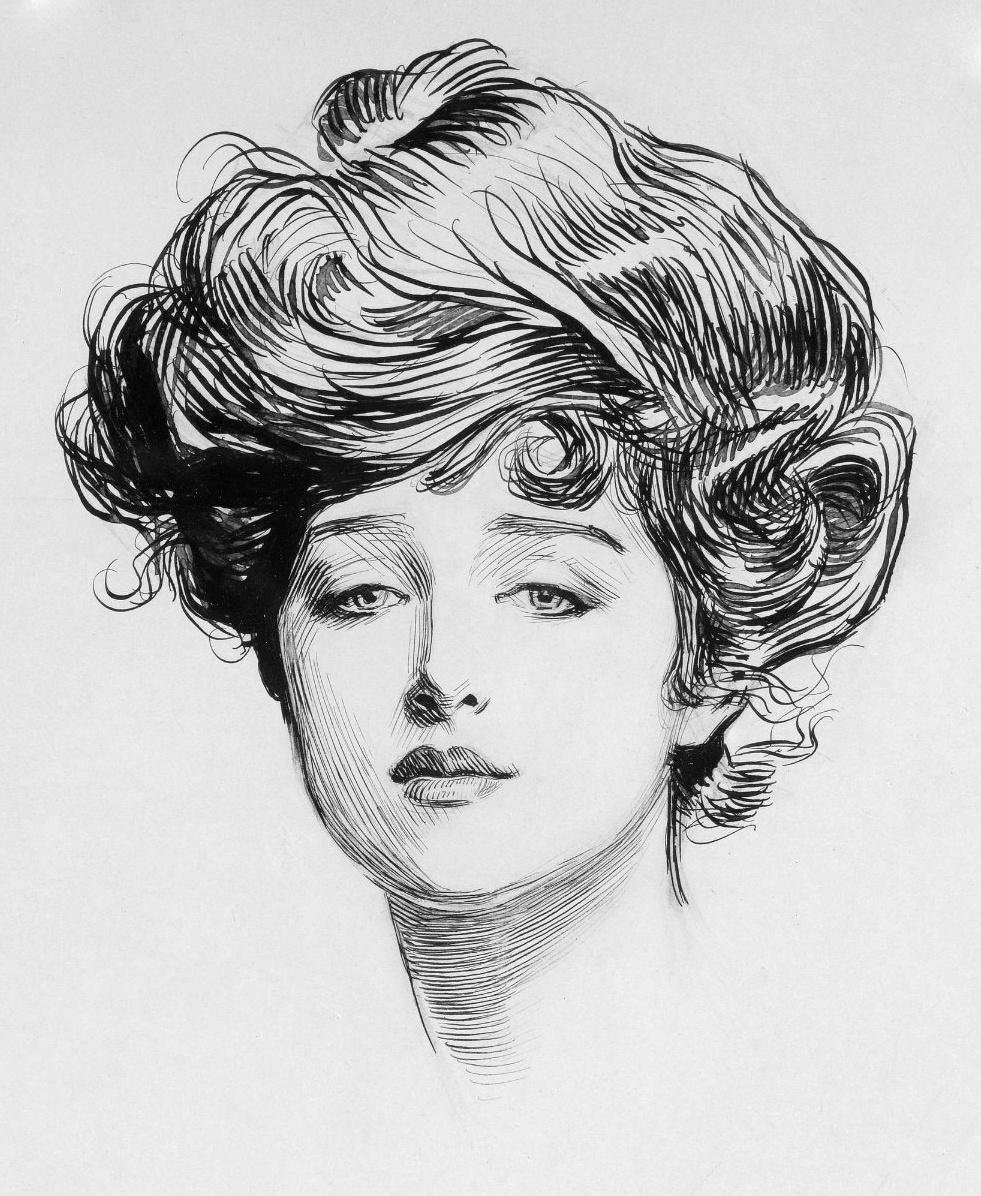
Drawing of a Gibson Girl by Charles Dana Gibson (c. 1891)

The bouffant is a variant of the pouf hairstyle from the 18th century, popularly used in the aesthetics of aristocratic society and the upper socio-economic classes of the French Empire. The bouffant, along with similar hairstyles like the pouf and the pompadour, represented an exclusive hairstyle of the upper socio-economic classes. The hairstyle was typically created in aristocratic wigs, which were adorned with feathers, ribbons, flowers, and jewelry, and accompanied by various headpieces, hats, and fascinators. Voluminous hairstyles like the bouffant and the pompadour became popular again among high society women in the late Victorian era, where full-bodied hair was considered an attribute of the upper socio-economic classes, leading to the use of cosmetic solutions and hairpieces to add volume to the hairstyle.

At the end of the 19th century, the bouffant style found appreciation during the Belle Époque period. The hairstyle was revived through the concept of feminine beauty created by American illustrator Charles Dana Gibson, who popularized the aesthetic of the Gibson Girl as one of the first forms of pin-up beauty in the late 19th century. The iconic Gibson Girl was often depicted in contemporary fashion, wearing figure-accentuating clothing, hats, and headpieces, and portrayed with voluminous bouffant and pompadour hairstyles. The sophisticated perception of women in the Gibson Girl model contributed to the popularity of this aesthetic, including the bouffant hairstyle, until the period of World War I.

=== 20th and 21st centuries ===
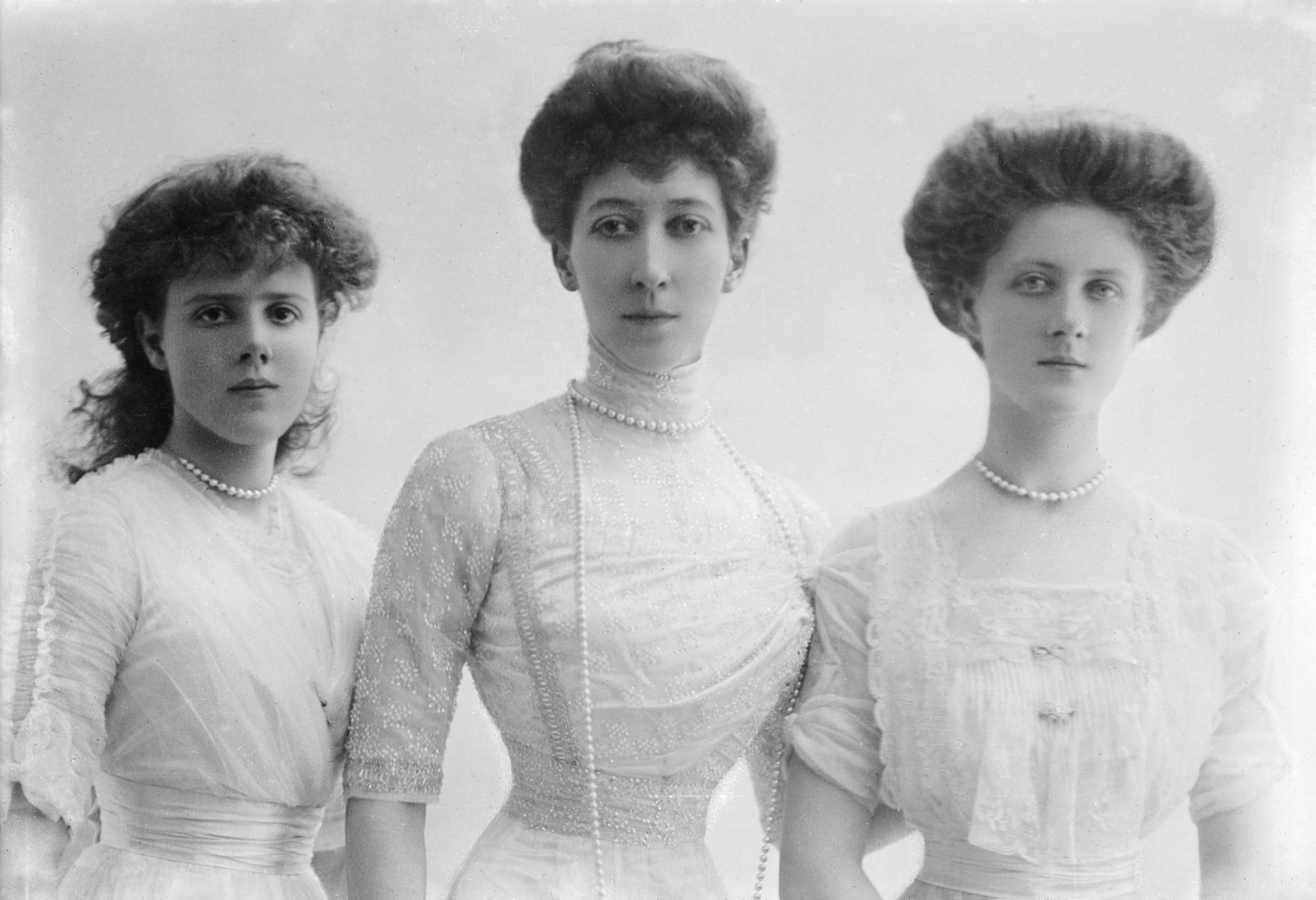
Louise, Princess Royal and Duchess of Fife (1867–1931) with her daughters Princess Maud (1893–1945) and Princess Alexandra (1891–1959), c. 1911.

After the political succession from the reign of Queen Victoria to King Edward VII, the bouffant continued to be a symbol of aristocracy in the early years of the Edwardian era, marked by the integration of new hairstyling techniques such as the use of hair waxes, fixatives, and hairpieces to add volume to the hairstyle. The bouffant and the Gibson Girl aesthetic were later replaced by modern versions of new femininity, which included the bob hairstyles and the flapper woman's style.

The bouffant hairstyle made a comeback in the early 1950s during the rockabilly aesthetic, along with the pompadour hairstyle. Its revival in women's fashion in the 1950s is credited to British stylist Raymond Bessone. The hairstyle was often referred to as teasy-weasy due to the popularity of Bessone's bouffant hairstyle, which became its commonly known name.

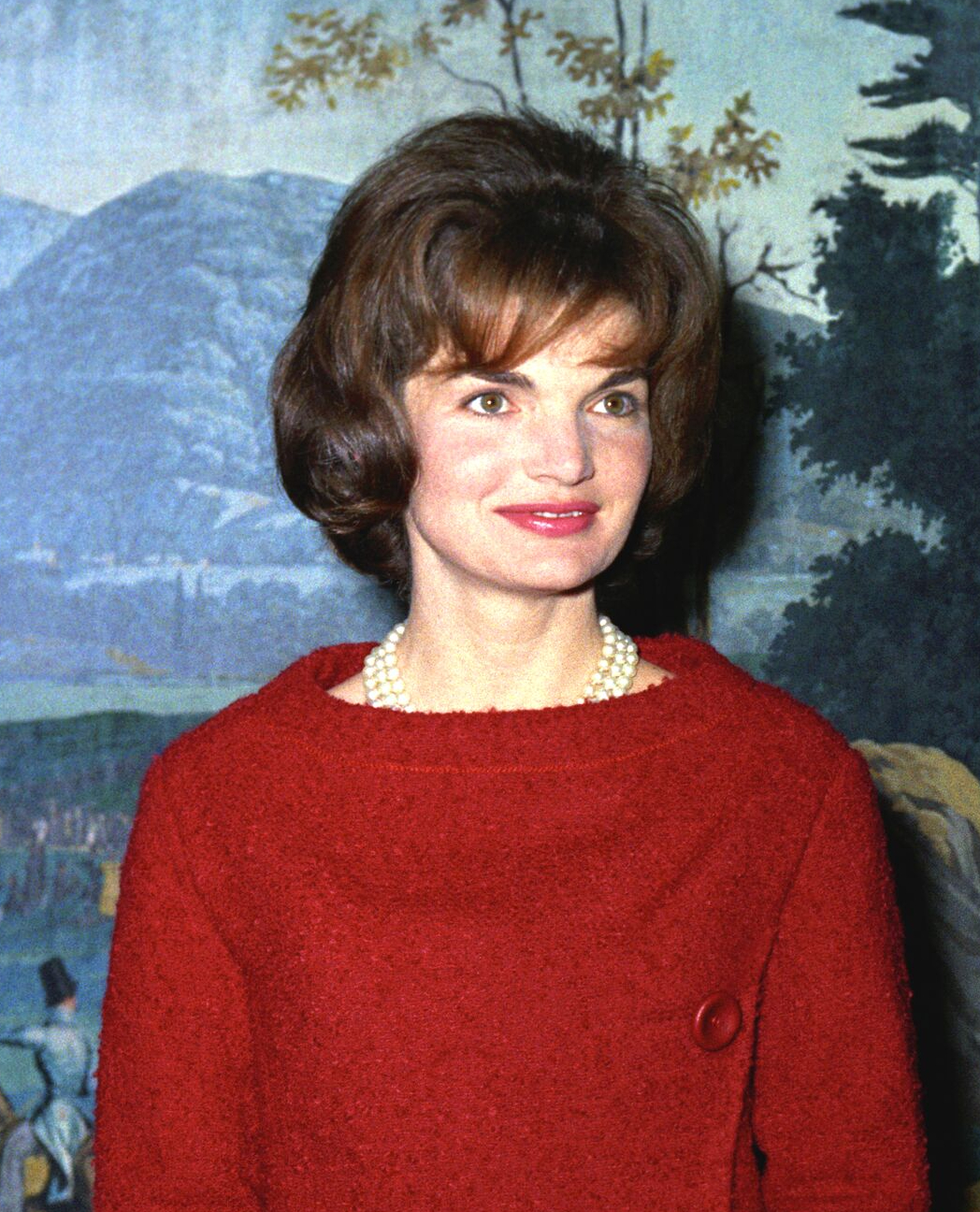
Jacqueline Kennedy in the Diplomatic Reception Room, 5 December 1961, White House, diplomatic reception

The popularity of the bouffant hairstyle in the 1950s was greatly strengthened in the United States when the First Lady, Jacqueline Kennedy, frequently appeared with a low bouffant in the form of a bob cut. The hairstyle became the traditional look for American housewives in the 1960s as it was often used to create a taller appearance for the wearer. With this intention, a variation of the bouffant known as the beehive emerged. The beehive consisted of a voluminous mass of hair styled in a roll or hive-like shape resting on top of the crown of the head, characterized by its considerable height and often accompanied by bangs. The beehive hairstyle became iconic for artists like Dusty Springfield and in more modern times, for the look sported by Amy Winehouse.

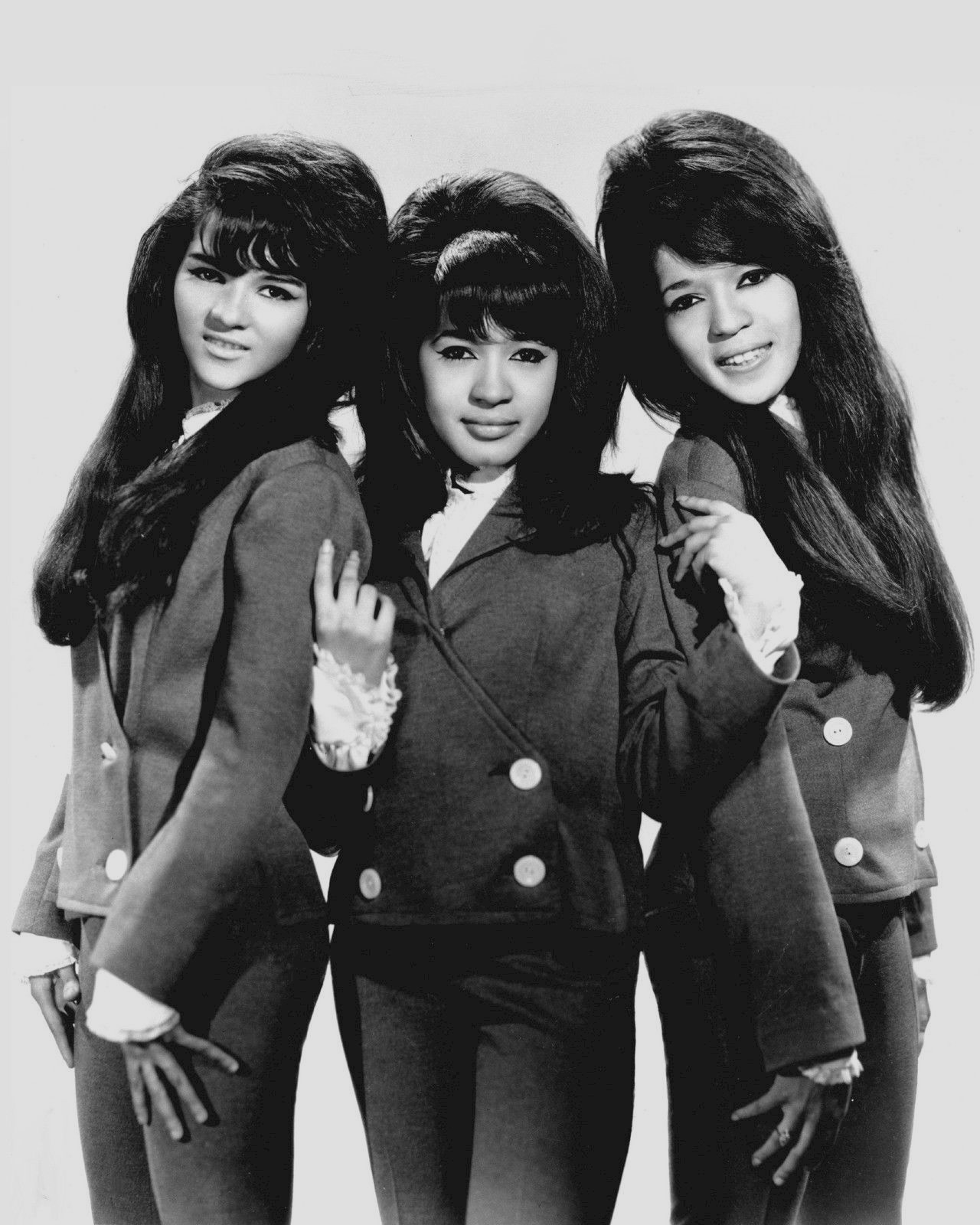
Promotional photo of The Ronettes (1966)

During the 1960s, the bouffant gained notable popularity among musical personalities, especially members of girls groups performing R&B, bubblegum pop, soul, and doo-woop music. Some groups that adopted the bouffant in the 1960s included The Supremes, The Ronettes, The Shirelles, and Martha and the Vandellas. This popularity contributed to a significant increase in sales of hair rollers and hairspray during the 1960s.

The revival of the beehive hairstyle is recognized to have emerged with the fame of Amy Winehouse in the 2000s. The bouffant (including its variation, the beehive, and the pompadour hairstyle) experienced a resurgence in popularity in the 2010s due to the aesthetic influence of the hipster subculture as well as retro rockabilly trends, with music personalities like Adele and Rihanna sporting these hairstyles.

== Method ==
Hair on the top of the head was often raised by backcombing or "teasing" it with a comb to create a pile of tangled, loosely knotted hair on the top and upper sides of the head. Then, unteased hair from the front of the head was lightly combed over the pile to give a smooth, sleek look, and the ends of the outer hair might be combed, cut, curled, or flipped in many distinctive ways.

In some cases, a small wiglet or a cushion of nylon mesh might be used instead of or in addition to teasing, to add height at the crown of the head. Bangs might be worn over the forehead, or a long switch or "fall" of artificial hair, matching the wearer's own hair color, might be added at the back.

Usually, hair spray or hair lacquer was applied as a finishing touch to stiffen the hairdo and hold it in place without the need for hairpins. Since the hair could not be brushed without ruining the style, adjustments were made by using the long, pointed end of a "rattail" comb to gently lift the hair back into place.

== Gallery ==
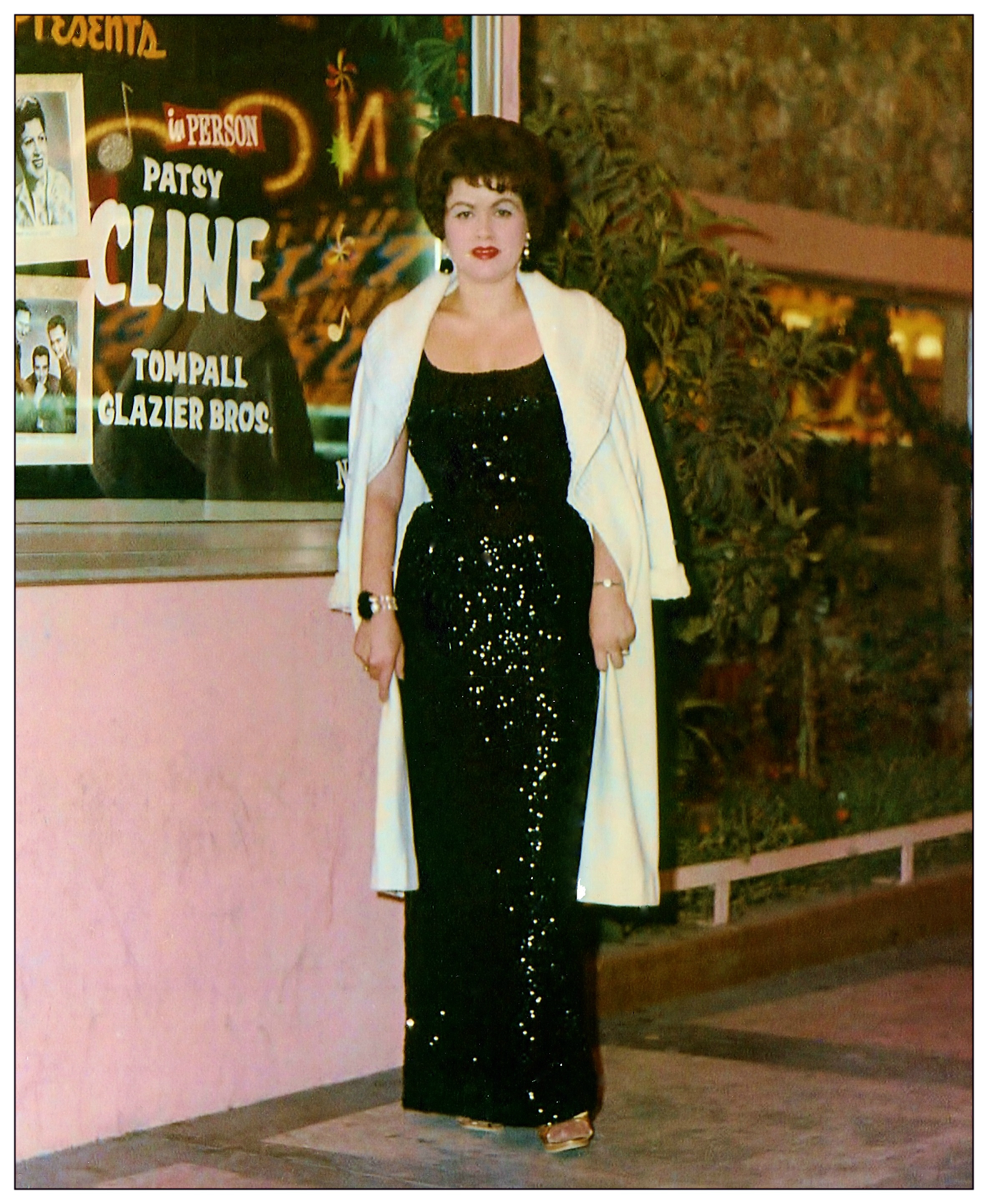
Country-western superstar Patsy Cline wearing a bouffant in 1962

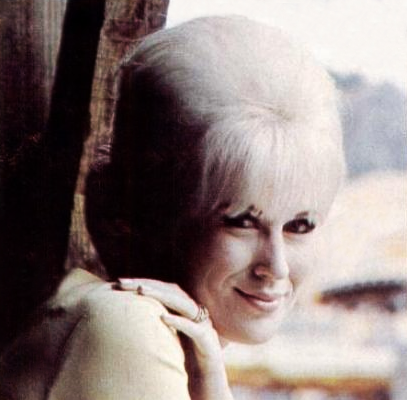
Swinging London icon Dusty Springfield with a bouffant in 1966

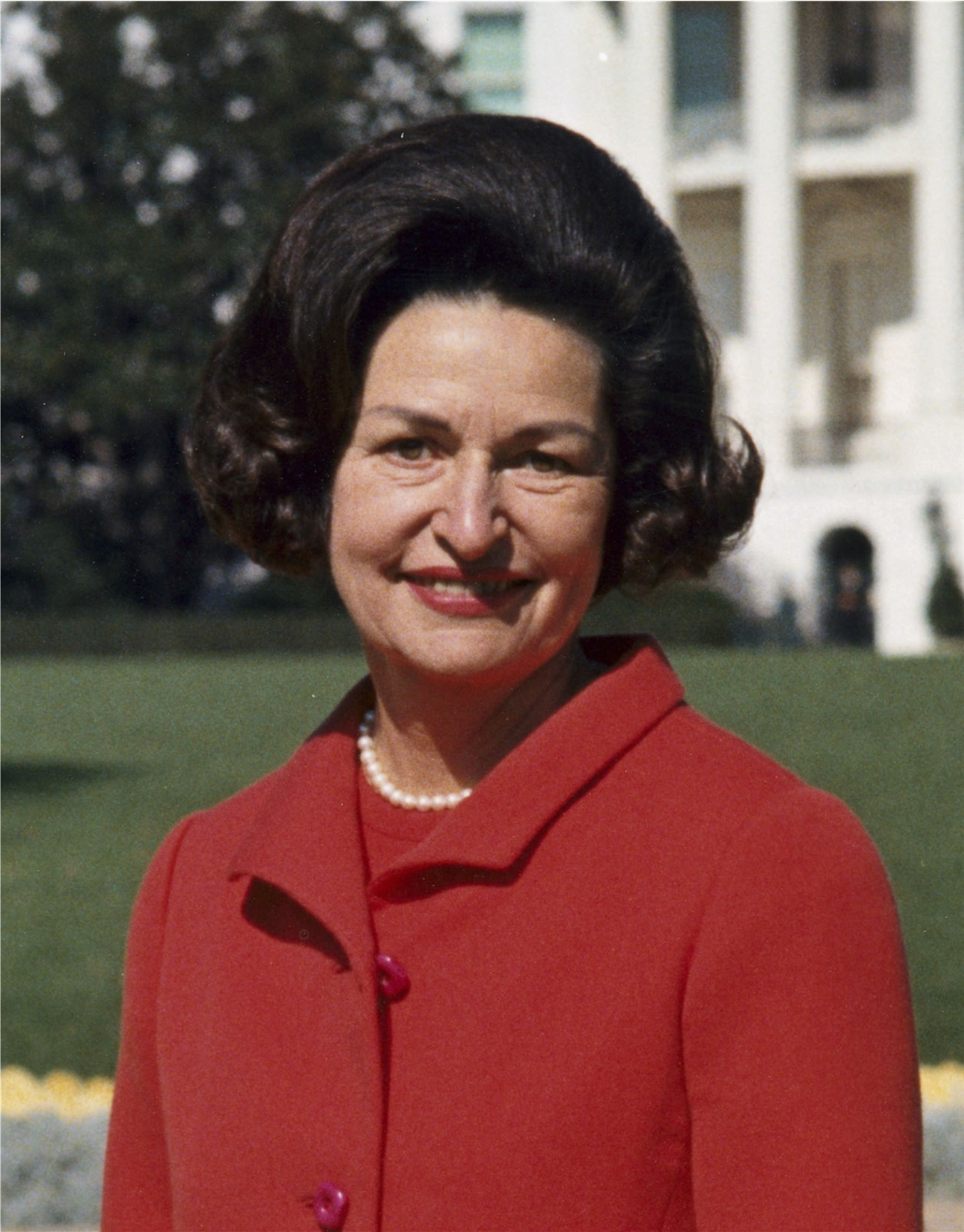
Lady Bird Johnson wearing a bouffant in 1967

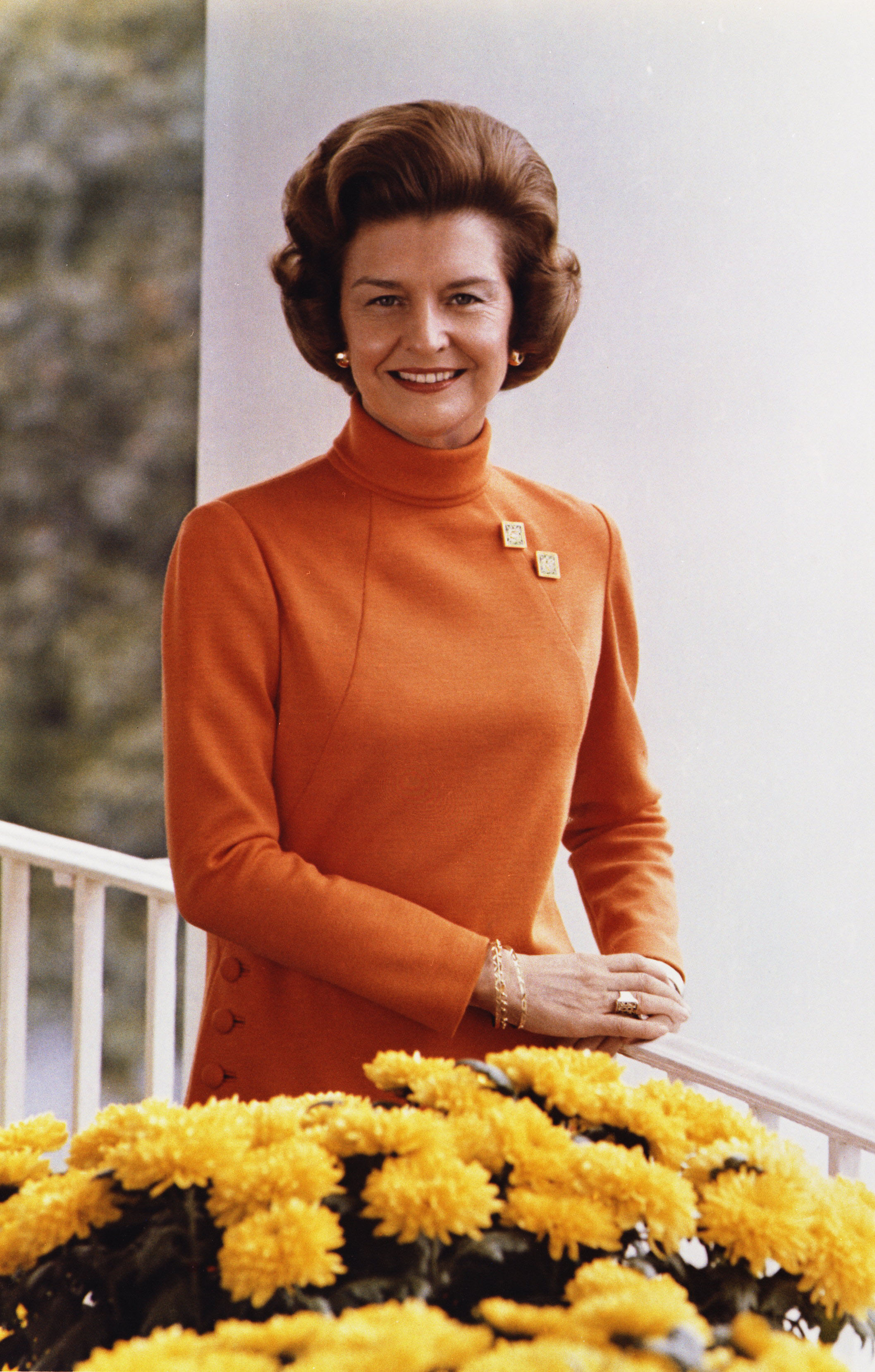
First Lady Betty Ford, 1974

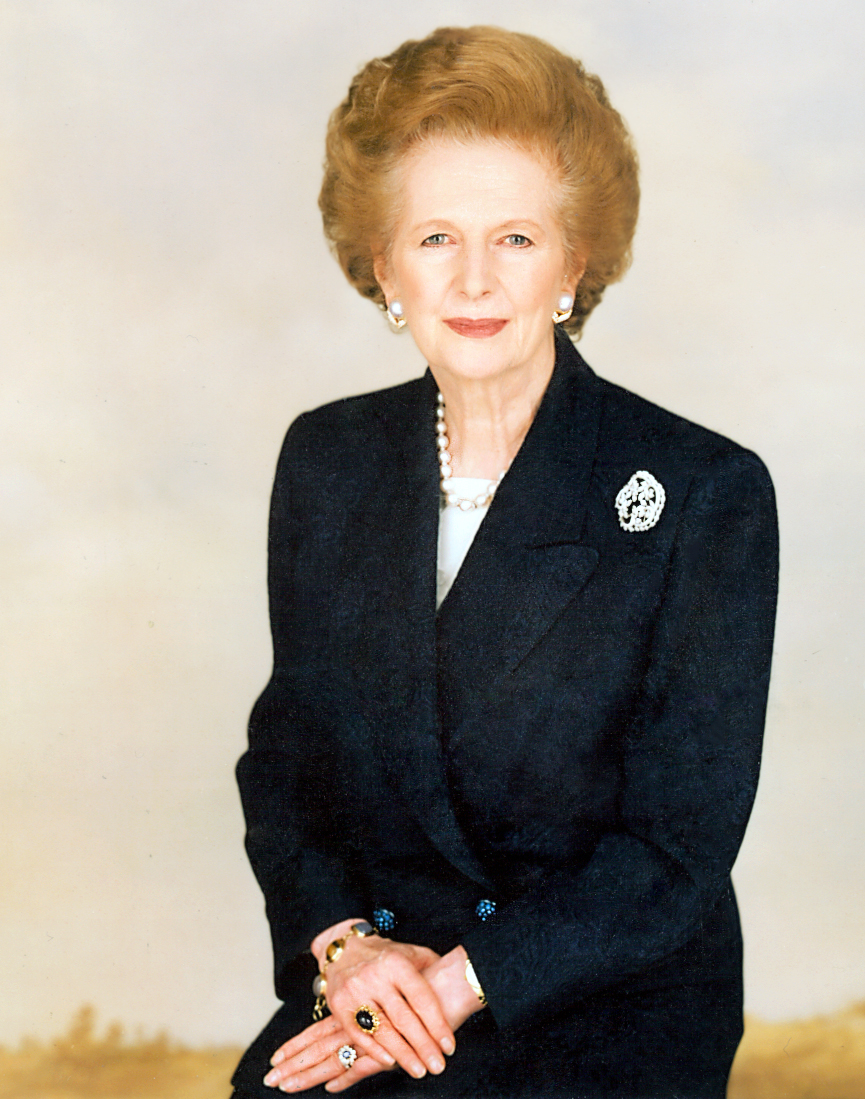
Former Prime Minister Margaret Thatcher, circa 1995

== See also ==
- Beehive (hairstyle)
- Big hair
- List of hairstyles
- Pompadour (hairstyle)
