= Chelengk =

Military decoration of the Ottoman Empire

Chelengk of the Ottoman Empire
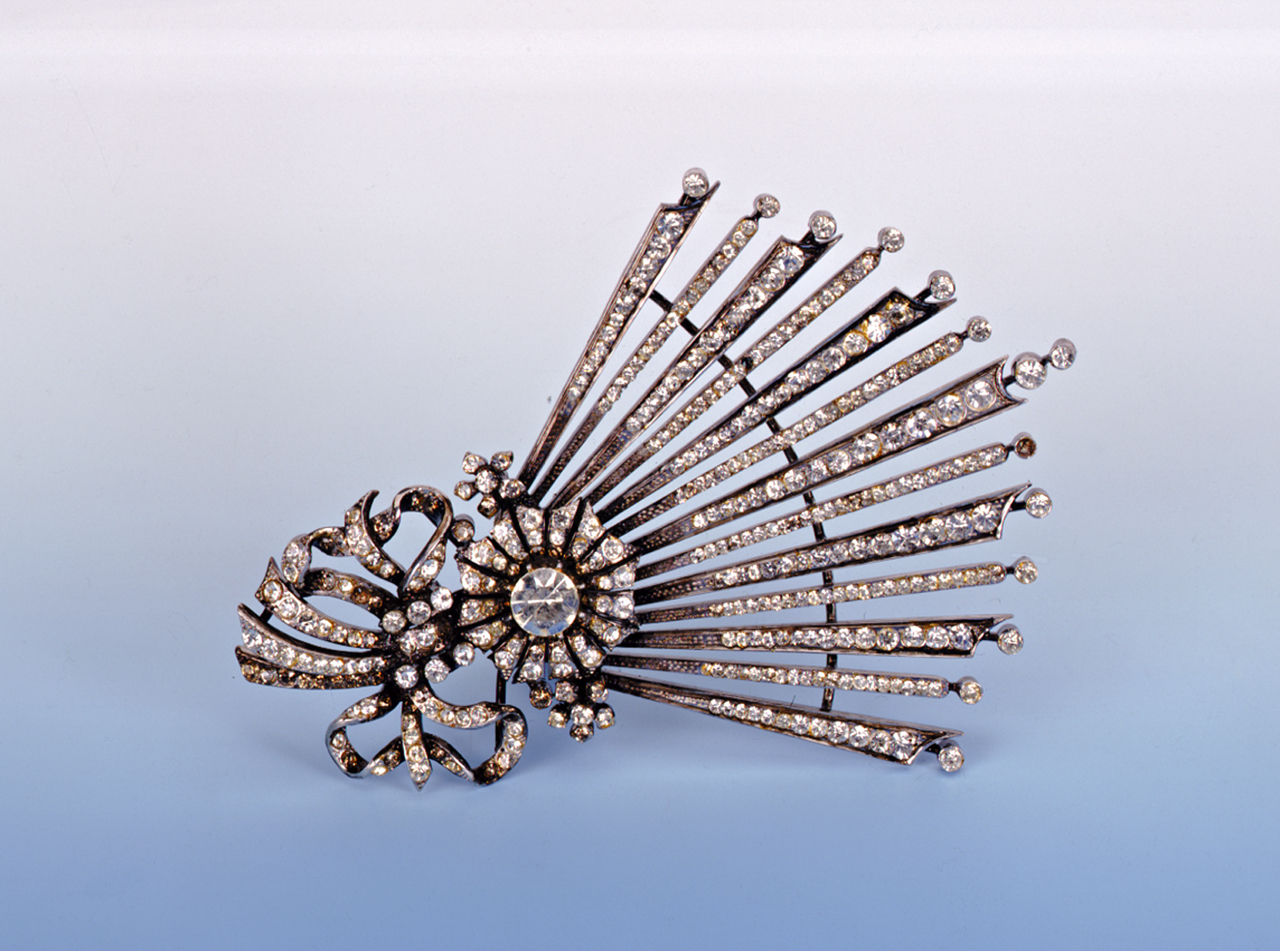
- Replica of Lord Nelson's diamond chelengk
- Type: Jewellery
- Awarded for: Outstanding services to the state
- Country: Ottoman Empire
- Presented by: Ottoman Sultan
- Eligibility: Civilians and military
- Status: No longer awarded
- Established: 1798

Precedence
- Next (higher): Order of Osmanieh
- Next (lower): Gallipoli Star

A chelengk (Ottoman Turkish: چـلنك; Turkish: çelenk, pronounced [tʃeˈlæɲc]) was a military decoration of the Ottoman Empire.

== Turkish military award ==
Originally a çelenk was "a bird's feather which one attaches to the turban as a sign of bravery" but by the end of the 18th century, the çelenk had become institutionalized in Ottoman military practice and continued to be awarded for military merit up to the 1820s. It was a jewelled aigrette consisting of a central flower with leaves and buds, and upward-facing rays.

In modern Turkish, a çelenk is a wreath or garland, a circular decoration made from flowers and leaves, usually arranged as an ornament.

== Gifts to non-Turkish naval heroes ==
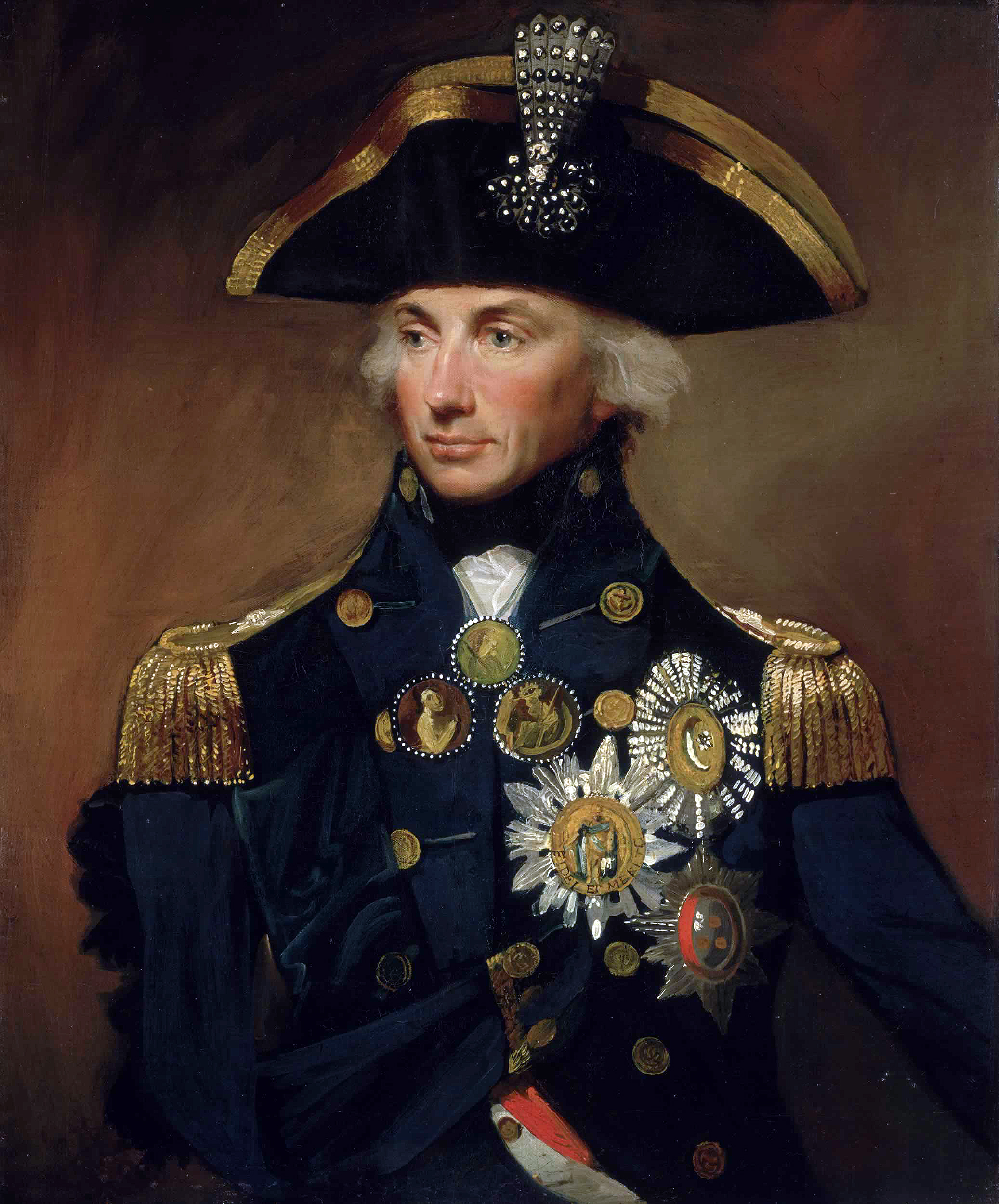
Portrait of Horatio Nelson, by Lemuel Francis Abbott, with a chelengk in his hat. Abbott seems to have painted this portrait without seeing Nelson's chelengk.

A specially-made chelengk was awarded to Horatio Nelson by Sultan Selim III in honour of the Battle of the Nile in 1798. This was the first time that a chelengk was conferred on a non-Ottoman. The usual seven rays were augmented to thirteen, as described in a contemporary letter:

The Aigrette is a kind of feather; it represents a hand with thirteen fingers, which are of diamonds, and allusive to the thirteen ships taken and destroyed at Alexandria, the size that of a child's hand about six years old when opened; the center diamond and the four round it may be worth about £1000 each, and there are about 300 others well set.

Nelson's chelengk was bought by the Society for Nautical Research in 1929 following a national appeal and placed in the National Maritime Museum. It was stolen in 1951 by Taters Chatham and never recovered.

Selim III also gave a chelengk to Russian Admiral Fyodor Ushakov after the capture of Corfu from the French in 1799.

== See also ==
- Wreath
- Sarpech

== Sources ==
- Roy Adkins & Lesley Adkins (2007). The War for All Oceans: From Nelson at the Nile to Napoleon at Waterloo. Abacus. p. 38. ISBN 978-0-349-11916-8.
- "Replica of Nelson's chelengk". National Maritime Museum.
