= Jay Trump =

American-bred Thoroughbred racehorse

- Sire: Tonga Prince
- Grandsire: Polynesian
- Dam: Be Trump
- Damsire: Bernborough
- Sex: Gelding
- Foaled: April 1, 1957
- Died: Aug 24, 1988
- Country: United States
- Colour: Bay
- Breeder: Jay Sensenich
- Owner: Mary Stephenson
- Trainer: Bobby Fenwick, Mikey Smithwick, Fred Winter
- Record: 26: 12-3-1
- Earnings: $64,425

Major wins
- Maryland Hunt Cup (1963, 1964, 1966); Grand National (1965)

Honours
- United States Racing Hall of Fame inductee (1971); Maryland Thoroughbred Hall of Fame

Jay Trump (1957–1988) was an American thoroughbred racehorse and one of only two horses to win both the Maryland Hunt Cup and the Grand National steeplechase races. Jay Trump won three Maryland Hunt Cups, 1963, 1964, 1966. In 1965 he won the English Grand National.

== Background ==
Jay Trump was born April 1, 1957, and was the product of an unplanned breeding. His sire was Tonga Prince, his dam Be Trump. They were paddock mates, Be Trump was considered infertile. He spent his early years training at "Shanty Town", located near the Charles Town race track, in West Virginia, where he raced.

== Racing career ==
Jay Trump's early race record was unremarkable; he ran 8 times, with one second-place finish, earning $220. In 1960, amateur steeplechase jockey, Crompton "Tommy" Smith, purchased Jay Trump as a steeplechase prospect for Mary Stephenson, who was a family friend. Smith was the grandson of the great sportsman and steeplechase racer Harry Worcester Smith, who in 1912 and 1913 traveled to Ireland, England, and France as the invited "Master of the Westmeath Hounds."

Jay Trump won his first race in 1962. In 1963, he won his first Maryland Hunt Cup, setting a course record while defeating Mountain Dew. Plans were hatched to take Jay Trump to England for the Grand National, but it was thought better to wait another year. He won the Maryland Hunt Cup for a second time in 1964, again defeating Mountain Dew. Later that year, he was shipped to England. He won his first race for trainer Fred Winter at Sandown on October 21, 1964; this was also the first winner for the trainer. Jay Trump won two more races and finished second in the King George VI Chase as he prepared for the Grand National.

In 1965, Jay Trump won the English Grand National, defeating Freddy in a battle to the line. He was the first Maryland Hunt Cup horse to win the Grand National as well as the first American-owned, -bred, and -ridden winner of the Grand National. Since that time, Ben Nevis II has repeated the feat of winning the Maryland Hunt Cup in 1977 and 1978 and the Grand National in 1980. After his Grand National victory, Jay Trump went to France to run in the Grand Steeplechase. He was the favorite but finished third to Hyeres III, who had also won the race in 1964.

Jay Trump then returned to the United States, where he ran in one more Maryland Hunt Cup, in 1966. He won that race and was promptly retired. Mountain Dew was second to Jay Trump in this race for the third time. Mountain Dew also won three Maryland Hunt Cup races.

== Honors ==
Jay Trump is in the National Museum of Racing and Hall of Fame.

Jay Trump was part of the first group of horses that entered the Maryland Thoroughbred Hall of Fame. He is buried at the finish line of the Kentucky Horse Park's Steeplechase course.

== Books ==
Books that have been written about Jay Trump include Peter Winant's Jay Trump: A Steeplechasing Saga, and Jane Mcllvaine's The Will to Win: The True Story of Tommy Smith and Jay Trump.

== Grand National record ==
Grand National	Position	Jockey	Age	Weight	SP	Distance
1965	1st	Tommy Smith	8	11–5	100/6	

== See also ==
- List of racehorses
