= 1963 Grand National =

English steeplechase horse race

- Grand National
- Location: Aintree
- Date: 30 March 1963
- Winning horse: Ayala
- Starting price: 66/1
- Jockey: Pat Buckley
- Trainer: (England) Keith Piggott
- Owner: (England) Raymond Bessone and Keith Piggott
- Conditions: Soft

External videos
- BBC
- British Pathé Highlights

The 1963 Grand National was the 117th renewal of the Grand National horse race that took place at Aintree Racecourse near Liverpool, England, on 30 March 1963.

The race was won narrowly by 66/1 shot Ayala, ridden by 19-year-old jockey Pat Buckley. Forty-seven horses ran and all returned safely to the stables. Ayala was jointly owned by his trainer, Keith Piggott, father of Lester Piggott, and by Raymond Bessone, the hairdresser also known as Teasy-Weasy. Piggott's father (and Lester's grandfather), Ernie, rode the winners of the National in 1912 and 1919. Owen's Sedge who came 7th in the race was owned by American actor Gregory Peck. Peck attended the Grand National then immediately left for Los Angeles where he won the Best Actor Academy Award for his performance as Atticus Finch in To Kill A Mockingbird (film).

== Finishing order ==
| Position | Name | Jockey | Age | Handicap (st-lb) | SP | Distance |
|---|---|---|---|---|---|---|
| 01 | Ayala | Pat Buckley | 9 | 10-0 | 66/1 | 3/4 Length |
| 02 | Carrickbeg | John Lawrence | 7 | 10-3 | 20/1 | 5 Lengths |
| 03 | Hawa's Song | Paddy Broderick | 10 | 10-0 | 28/1 | |
| 04 | Team Spirit | Willie Robinson | 11 | 10-3 | 13/1 | |
| 05 | Springbok | Gerry Scott | 9 | 10-12 | 10/1 | |
| 06 | Kilmore | Fred Winter | 13 | 11-0 | 100/8 | |
| 07 | Owen's Sedge | Pat Taaffe | 10 | 11-6 | 20/1 | |
| 08 | French Lawyer | Tim Ryan | 9 | 10-0 | 50/1 | |
| 09 | Dark Venetian | Dave Bassett | 8 | 10-2 | 33/1 | |
| 10 | Nicolaus Silver | Bobby Beasley | 11 | 11-0 | 28/1 | |
| 11 | Eternal | Tim Brookshaw | 12 | 10-10 | 25/1 | |
| 12 | Chavara | Roy Edwards | 10 | 10-2 | 40/1 | |
| 13 | Carraroe | William Mclernon | 11 | 10-1 | 33/1 | |
| 14 | Siracusa | David Mould | 10 | 10-0 | 33/1 | |
| 15 | Sham Flight | Jimmy Fitzgerald | 11 | 10-1 | 50/1 | |
| 16 | Blonde Warrior | Brian Lawrence | 11 | 10-9 | 66/1 | |
| 17 | Loyal Tan | Terry Biddlecombe | 8 | 10-5 | 66/1 | |
| 18 | Woodbrown | John Kenneally | 9 | 10-0 | 66/1 | |
| 19 | O'Malley Point | Michael Scudamore | 12 | 11-1 | 33/1 | |
| 20 | Frenchman's Cove | David Dick | 8 | 12-0 | 100/6 | |
| 21 | Forty Secrets | Clive Chapman | 9 | 10-7 | 50/1 | |
| 22 | Dandy Tim | Larry Major | 10 | 10-0 | 50/1 | Last to complete |

== Non-finishers ==
| Fence | Name | Jockey | Age | Handicap (st-lb) | Starting price | Fate |
|---|---|---|---|---|---|---|
| 16 | Mr Jones | Paddy Farrell | 8 | 10-0 | 28/1 | Unseated Rider |
| 27 | Out And About | Josh Gifford | 8 | 10-7 | 25/1 | Unseated Rider |
| 06 | Good Gracious | Paddy Connors | 9 | 10-7 | 66/1 | Fell |
| 20 | Jonjo | Duke of Alburquerque | 13 | 10-6 | 66/1 | Unseated Rider |
| 27 | Peacetown | Robin Langley | 9 | 10-4 | 50/1 | Fell |
| 29 | Gay Navaree | Patrick Cowley | 11 | 10-1 | 50/1 | Fell |
| 06 | Wingless | Terry Biddlecombe | 8 | 10-3 | 66/1 | Unseated Rider |
| 10 | Avenue Neuilly | David Nicholson | 8 | 10-4 | 66/1 | Fell |
| 10 | Connie II | Joe Guest | 11 | 10-0 | 50/1 | Fell |
| 04 | Wartown | Johnny Gamble | 12 | 10-1 | 66/1 | Refused |
| 20 | Look Happy | John Haine | 10 | 10-0 | 40/1 | Refused |
| 06 | Merganser | John Mansfield | 10 | 10-4 | 66/1 | Fell |
| 01 | Magic Tricks | Owen McNally | 9 | 10-0 | 66/1 | Fell |
| 06 | Solonace | Ken White | 12 | 10-0 | 66/1 | Fell |
| 25 | Loving Record | Toss Taaffe | 9 | 10-12 | 100/7 | Pulled Up |
| 29 | Dagmar Gittell | Johnny East | 8 | 10-5 | 100/7 | Pulled Up |
| 12 | Moyrath | Francis Carroll | 10 | 10-2 | 33/1 | Refused |
| 23 | Seas End | John Kempton | 11 | 10-3 | 66/1 | Pulled Up |
| 22 | College Don | Jumbo Wilkinson | 11 | 10-0 | 66/1 | Pulled Up |
| 28 | Reprieved | Peter Pickford | 10 | 10-1 | 50/1 | Pulled Up |
| 11 | Holm Star | Gene Kelly | 9 | 10-0 | 66/1 | Pulled Up |
| 28 | Capricorn | Adrian Major | 10 | 10-0 | 66/1 | Pulled Up |
| 11 | Melilla | Gordon Cramp | 9 | 10-0 | 66/1 | Pulled Up |
| 11 | Mr. What | Tommy Carberry | 13 | 10-8 | 66/1 | Refused |
| 09 | Vivant | Rex Hamey | 10 | 10-0 | 40/1 | Fell |

== Media coverage ==
David Coleman presented Grand National Grandstand on the BBC. The commentary team remained the same as the previous year, Peter O'Sullevan, Bob Haynes and Peter Montague-Evans.
