= Ayala (horse) =

British-bred racehorsee

- Sire: Supertello
- Dam: Admiral's Bliss
- Sex: Gelding
- Country: United Kingdom
- Colour: Chestnut
- Breeder: J.P. Philipps
- Owner: Raymond Bessone and Keith Piggott
- Trainer: Keith Piggott

Major wins
- Grand National (1963)

Ayala was a British-bred racehorse who competed in National Hunt racing.

He is best known for winning the 1963 Grand National.

Ayala entered the 1963 National inexperienced and with a poor record but remarkably as a 66/1 longshot managed a narrow victory ridden by 19-year-old jockey Pat Buckley. Ayala was jointly owned by his trainer, Keith Piggott, father of champion jockey Lester Piggott, and by Raymond Bessone, the celebrity hairdresser also known as Teasy-Weasy. Piggott's father (and Lester's grandfather), Ernie, rode the winners of the National in 1912 and 1919.

Keith Piggott had bought Ayala for 250 guineas at Epsom three years prior to his 1963 National win. This victory proved to be Ayala's only major win as he fell in both the 1964 and 1965 Nationals.

== Grand National record ==
Grand National	Position	Jockey	Age	Weight	SP	Distance
1963	1st	Pat Buckley	9	10-0	66/1	3/4 Length
1964	DNF	David Nicholson	10	10-7	33/1	Fell at fence 15
1965	DNF	Stan Mellor	11	10-13	50/1	Fell at fence 1
