= Peter Scott (thief) =

British burglar and thief

Scott

Peter Scott (born Peter Craig Gulston) (18 February 1931 – 17 March 2013) was a Northern Irish burglar and thief who was variously described as the "King of the Cat Burglars", "Burglar to the Stars" and the "Human Fly". Scott described himself as a "master idiot".

== Life ==
Scott was born Peter Craig Gulston in Belfast, Northern Ireland, into a middle-class military family. Following his father's death, his mother emigrated to the United States. Scott had spent his inheritance from his father by the time that he left the Belfast Royal Academy.

The 1965 film He Who Rides a Tiger, starring Tom Bell and Judi Dench, was made about Scott's exploits. At the time of the film's release, Scott was in prison in Dartmoor, and profited little from it. In 1995, Scott published a memoir, Gentleman Thief.

In his last years, Scott worked as a tennis coach at the Paddington Recreation Ground in Maida Vale, West London, and tended the gardens of a church in Camden, North London. Scott was a participant on the 2004 Channel 4 programme The Heist, in which staged robberies were carried out. Scott was also the subject of an award-winning short documentary, My Friend the Thief, made by Roland Hutchison.

At the end of his life, Scott drove an old Mercedes-Benz car, a gift from the son of London gangster Billy Hill. Scott was declared bankrupt at the end of his life, owing more than £400,000 to creditors. He was living on state benefits of £60 per week in an Islington council flat at the time of his death. Scott was married four times, and survived by one son.

== Burglary ==
Scott began his life of crime in his teens, targeting wealthy homes around Belfast's Malone Road. By the time he was caught by the police in 1952, Scott estimated that he had committed 150 burglaries, attributing his early success to looking like a resident. In later years Scott purchased a new suit before each job, so his appearance fitted in with the places he burgled. For these early crimes he served six months in Crumlin Road Gaol, later claiming that the police had only charged him with twelve burglaries because of their embarrassment at the scale of his exploits.

Adopting the surname Scott, he then moved to London. While working as a pub bouncer in the West End of London, he burgled houses in the evenings.

In prison in 1957, Scott met George "Taters" Chatham, then renowned as the most celebrated "cat burglar" in London. Working together, Scott and Chatham formed a criminal partnership that stole many millions of pounds' worth of art and jewellery by targeting furriers and jewellery boutiques on Bond Street, and art collectors in Mayfair. From his initial term in the late 1950s, Scott spent increasing periods of time in prison: three years in 1961, five in 1964, and four years in 1985.

According to Scott, notable victims of his burglaries included famous performers including Lauren Bacall, Maria Callas, Judy Garland, Zsa Zsa Gabor, Vivien Leigh, Sophia Loren, Shirley MacLaine and Elizabeth Taylor, and society figures including John Aspinall, Soraya Khashoggi, and Shah of Iran Mohammad Reza Pahlavi. Scott claimed that he had burgled Queen Elizabeth The Queen Mother, a crime that he claimed was covered up by a government "D-Notice" banning press coverage.

Scott described himself as having been "sent by God to take back some of the wealth that the outrageously rich had taken from the rest of us". When Scott cased Viscount Kemsley's Dropmore House in 1956, he saw guests sitting down to dinner, and likened himself to "a missionary seeing his flock for the first time... I decided these people were my life's work."

Disturbed during one burglary by a titled lady who appeared at the top of the stairs, Scott, well-dressed, shouted to her "'Everything's all right, madam,'... and she went off to bed thinking I was the butler." If Scott was disturbed on other occasions he would reassuringly shout "It's only me!".

In 1960 Scott stole a necklace worth £200,000, described as Britain's biggest jewellery theft, from the Italian actress Sophia Loren, who was in the United Kingdom filming The Millionairess. Scott received £30,000 from a "fence" for the necklace. Loren later pointed at him on television saying that she came "from a long line of gipsies. You will have no luck". Scott subsequently lost every penny gambling in Cannes.

In the 1950s and 1960s Scott selected victims by reading the society columns in the Daily Mail and Daily Express.

Although he claimed to have retired from his life of crime in the mid-1990s, having served a total of twelve years from several prison sentences, Scott was jailed for three and a half years for handling stolen goods in 1998. His imprisonment stemmed from the 1997 theft of Pablo Picasso's painting Tête de Femme from an art gallery in Mayfair. Scott quoted poet William Ernest Henley to the police who arrested him, declaring that "Under the bludgeonings of chance, my head is bloody but unbowed." Scott wrote that he had "an obscene passion for larceny" and described himself as "a man who has made all the mistakes that vanity, envy and greed create".
