= Raymond Bessone =

British celebrity hairdresser (1911–1992)

Raymond Bessone OBE
- Cover of Bessone's autobiography "Raymond"
- Born: Raymondo Pietro Carlo Bessone; 11 May 1911; Wardour Street, Soho, London, England
- Died: 17 April 1992 (aged 80); Windsor, Berkshire, England
- Other names: Mr Teasy-Weasy, Teasie Weasie Raymond, Raymond Raymond, Pierre Raymond Bessone
- Occupation: Hairdresser
- Spouse: Rosalie Ashley
- Children: 3

Peter Carlo Bessone Raymond OBE (born Raimondo Pietro Carlo Bessone; 11 May 1911 – 17 April 1992), known as Raymond Bessone and also as Mr Teasy-Weasy, Teasie Weasie Raymond and various combinations of these, was a British hairdresser from the 1930s to the 1960s.

== Early life and career ==
Bessone was born Raimondo Pietro Carlo Bessone at 61 Wardour Street, Soho, London, England of Italian and French parentage and descent. He subsequently Anglicised his name, and legally changed it by deed poll, to Peter Carlo Bessone Raymond. His name is sometimes, but incorrectly, given as Pierre Raymond Bessone.

Bessone began his career making false beards and moustaches in his father's barber shop. He subsequently opened his own salon in Mayfair, where he trained Vidal Sassoon. Building on his first salon, Bessone developed a chain of highly fashionable salons in the West End. He later opened outlets in several major cities, including Birmingham.

Bessone was the first hairdresser to appear on television, and had his own show at Saturday teatime. Regarded as Britain's first celebrity hairdresser, he cultivated a faux French accent and a camp manner. Bessone liked to pace around his salon and, if a customer approached him, he would then exclaim with exasperation, "Madam, can you not see that I am meditating!" His Knightsbridge salon was replete with gilt mirrors, chandeliers, and champagne fountains.

In 1956 Bessone was flown to the United States by Diana Dors, for a shampoo and set, at a cost of £2,500 (equivalent to £50,000). The stunt caused media controversy since a house could have been bought for the same amount.

In 1957 Bessone launched the Shangri-La style, based on "the four principles of colour, line, youth and softness" and inspired by his view of Swiss mountain peaks after being knocked out in a skiing accident.

In the early 1970s Bessone made a cameo appearance in the television soap opera Crossroads.

== Hairstyling ==
Except for girls under 20, Bessone considered that women should avoid having long hair because he considered it ageing. He was also of the opinion that, except for women with very regular features, a central parting should be avoided.

The modern bouffant is considered to be a Bessone invention. He also innovated by dyeing hair with bold colours, including pink, orange and purple.

== Horse racing ==
Bessone was the part-owner of 1963 Grand National winner Ayala.

He was also part-owner of 1976 Grand National winner Rag Trade. Although Bessone had bought the gelding himself for 18,000 guineas, at a public auction at Doncaster, he later sold two 25% shares in the horse to businessmen William Lawrie and Herbert Keane. With trainer Arthur Pitt the horse ran the 1975 Grand National, only managing to complete the course. Under trainer Fred Rimell, the following year, the horse won both the Welsh Grand National at Chepstow and the Grand National at Aintree. Bessone had hoped for a third win in 1977.

His racing colours were ice blue and wine halved, sleeves reversed.

== Personal life ==
Bessone was married first to Jennifer J. née Wilkinson, at Westminster, in late 1948 or early 1949. They had three daughters, Amber, Scarlet and Cherry and from 1951 lived at "Deep Meadow" in Fifield, Berkshire. Bessone divorced in 1962, before his second marriage, to actress Rosalie Ashley.

In 1979 his 28-year-old daughter Amber, who was pregnant, was killed when returning from a family wedding. Her car crossed a damaged section of the M4 motorway crash barrier and hit an oncoming Porsche. The two people in the Porsche, as well as Bessone's daughter, her husband and two children, were all killed instantly. Several weeks after the accident it was discovered that the male passenger killed in the Porsche was Brian Field, one of the organizers of the 1963 Great Train Robbery, who had changed his name to Brian Carleton.

Bessone received the OBE in the 1982 Birthday Honours, for services to hairdressing. He died in Windsor, Berkshire, on 17 April 1992, aged 80.

== Cultural references ==
James Dreyfus starred as Mr. Teasy-Weasy in the 2004 comedy film Churchill: The Hollywood Years. Sir John 'Teasy-Weasy' Butler, in Monty Python, was based on Bessone. In sci-fi comedy Red Dwarf, having been asked to navigate light speed and cut Rimmer's hair simultaneously, Holly says "I'm not a combination of the speaking clock, Moss Bros., and Teasy-Weasy!" In one episode of the 1950s BBC radio program Hancock's Half Hour titled Hancock's Hair. Sid James calls himself "Raymond" and Bill Kerr's response includes the nickname "Mr. Teasy-Weasy".

In November 2013 the BBC documentary series Timeshift broadcast "Bouffants, beehives and bobs: the hairstyles that shaped Britain", which featured the work of Bessone.

Two photographic portraits of Bessone are held by the National Portrait Gallery, London.

== Bibliography ==
- Bessone, Raymond (1940). Hair and All That: incorporating National Service coiffures.
