= Tommy Smith (jockey) =

American jockey

Crompton Smith better known as Tommy Smith (16 October 1937 in Middleberg, Virginia – 5 March 2013 in Upperco, Maryland) was an American jockey. He is best remembered as the first American jockey to win the prestigious Grand National steeplechase race while riding a horse born and trained in the United States. He accomplished the feat in 1965 with Jay Trump. A few months later, the same horse-jockey combination finished third in another important race: the Grand Steeple-Chase de Paris. Other notable wins by the pair include three victories in the Maryland Hunt Cup (1963, 1964, and 1966). In 1965, Smith appeared on the April 26 episode of the CBS game show To Tell the Truth. Despite considerable success, Smith quit jockeying in 1966 and began a career in the health-care industry. After his retirement in 1995, he moved to Maryland and started training thoroughbreds. A leisure riding accident in 2001 left him a quadriplegic. He died in 2013.

== Bibliography ==
The will to win : the true story of Tommy Smith and Jay Trump. Jane McIlvaine McClary (1966). OCLC 1354125
