= Un de Sceaux =

French racehorse

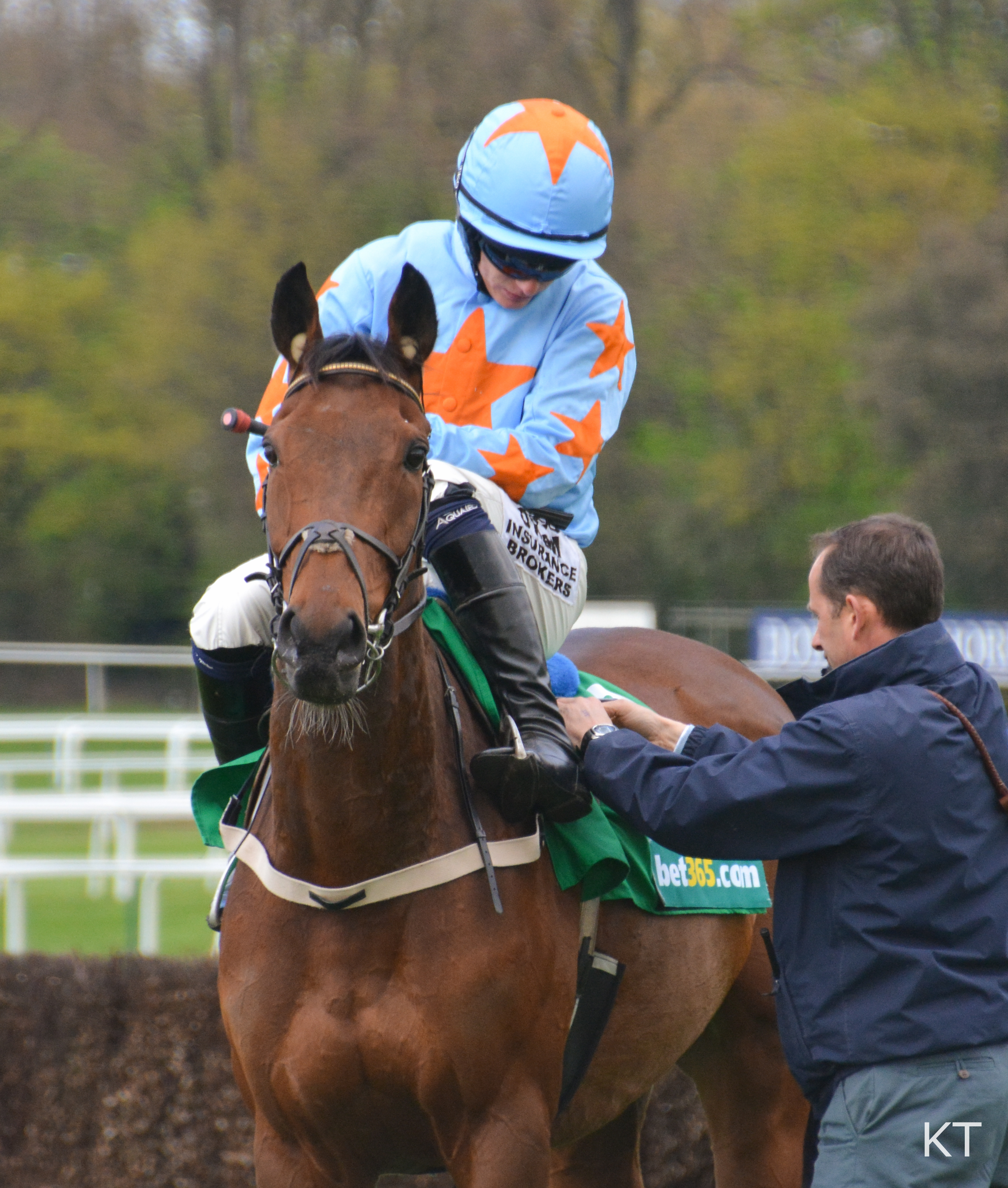
- Un de Sceaux, April 2016
- Sire: Denham Red (FR)
- Grandsire: Pampabird
- Dam: Hotesse de Sceaux
- Damsire: April Night
- Sex: Gelding
- Foaled: 5 May 2008
- Country: France
- Colour: Bay
- Breeder: Haras de La Rousseliere & Mme M. Choveau
- Owner: Fabrice Foucher; Edward O'Connell
- Trainer: Fabrice Foucher; Willie Mullins
- Record: 34: 23-7-0; 23:13-7-0 (Chases); 9:8-0-0 (Hurdles); 2:2-0-0 (Bumpers)
- Earnings: £1,583,124

Major wins
- Red Mills Trial Hurdle (2014); Prix Hypothese (2014); Prix Leon Rambaud (2014); Arkle Novice Chase (2015); Arkle Challenge Trophy (2015); Ryanair Novice Chase (2015); Clarence House Chase (2016, 2017, 2018); Prix La Barka (2016); Tingle Creek Chase (2016); Ryanair Chase (2017); Hilly Way Chase (2017); Devenish Chase (2018); Punchestown Champion Chase (2018, 2019)

Un de Sceaux (foaled 5 May 2008; French pronunciation: [ɛ̃ də so]) is a French-bred AQPS racehorse who competed in National Hunt racing. After winning both his races in France he was transferred to the yard of trainer Willie Mullins in Ireland where he won two novice hurdles. In the 2013/14 National Hunt season he was undefeated in five races including the Red Mills Trial Hurdle in Ireland and both the Prix Hypothese and the Prix Leon Rambaud in France. When switched to steeplechases he recovered from a fall on his debut to win the Arkle Novice Chase, Arkle Challenge Trophy and Ryanair Novice Chase in the 2014/15 season. In 2015/16 he won the Clarence House Chase but was beaten by Sprinter Sacre when favourite for the Queen Mother Champion Chase. He began the 2016/17 season with a win in the Tingle Creek Chase and followed up with his second victory in the Clarence House Chase before taking the Ryanair Chase in March. In 2018 Un de Sceaux became the first horse to win three Clarence House chases but was disappointed at Cheltenham by Balko des Flos when attempting to regain his Ryanair crown. He finished the season on a high by winning the Devenish Chase at Fairyhouse before surprising his stablemate Douvan in the Punchestown Champion Chase, a race he won again in 2019. In the 2019/20 season he was beaten into second place by Defi Du Seuil in both the Tingle Creek Chase and the Clarence House Chase. In February 2020, while preparing for his sixth trip to the Cheltenham Festival, Un de Sceaux sustained a suspensory ligament injury and Mullins announced that the twelve-year-old would be retired to France. He had won 23 of his 34 starts, including ten Grade 1 victories.

== Background ==
Un de Sceaux is a bay gelding with two white socks bred in France by the Haras de La Rousseliere (based in Soulaire-et-Bourg) & Mme M. Choveau. His sire, Denham Red, won over hurdles in France before becoming a successful sire of jumpers. Un de Sceaux's dan Hotesse de Sceaux was officially an AQPS mare as her damsire Diarifos was not a Thoroughbred. During the early part of his racing career, the horse was trained in France by his owner Fabrice Foucher.

== Racing career ==
=== Early career ===
Un de Sceaux ran twice as a four-year-old in France in flat races for non-Thoroughbred horses, winning by twenty lengths at Machecoul in February and by seven lengths at Saint-Brieuc in October. He was then sold and sent to race in Ireland where he entered the ownership of Edward O'Connell and was trained by Willie Mullins. On his first appearance in Ireland he was ridden by Ruby Walsh and started 9/10 favourite for a Novice Hurdle race on 20 February at Punchestown Racecourse and led from the start to win by six lengths from Sammy Black and sixteen others. Two months later he started 5/4 favourite over the same course and distance and again made all the running to beat Moscow Mannon by thirteen lengths.

=== 2013/14 National Hunt season: hurdles ===
Un de Sceaux was unbeaten in five races over hurdles in the 2013/14 National Hunt season. He began the season by winning by twenty-nine lengths at Thurles Racecourse in December and followed up at Navan Racecourse three weeks later coming home more than fifty lengths clear of his two opponents. In February he was moved up in class to contest the Grade 2 Red Mills Trial Hurdle on heavy ground at Gowran Park. Starting at odds of 1/14 he led from the start as usual won very easily by sixteen lengths from Midnight Game. Mullins opted to miss the 2014 Cheltenham Festival and instead sent the horse to race in France in spring. On 29 March he was matched against the Grande Course de Haies d'Auteuil winner Gemix in the Prix Hypothese over 3900 metres at Auteuil Hippodrome from whom he was receiving eight pounds. Ridden by Barry Geraghty, he led from the start and went fifteen lengths clear of the field but had to be ridden out in the closing stages to hold the late challenge of Gemix by a short neck. Ruby Walsh was reunited with Un de Sceaux a month later, when the gelding faced Gemix again in the Prix Leon Rambaud over the same course and distance. He took the lead at the first hurdle and was never headed, winning by two lengths from Le Grand Luce with Gemix in fourth. Walsh was later to say that the horse's races in France "made a man of him".

=== 2014/15 National Hunt season: novice chases ===
In the 2014/15 season, Un de Sceaux was campaigned in novice steeplechases. On his debut over the larger obstacles, he started 1/8 favourite at Thurles in November, but after building up a considerable lead, he fell at the third last fence. Walsh described it as "a novicey fall" and insisted "he's a hell of a good horse". A month later at Fairyhouse he recorded his first chasing success when he won by twelve lengths from Smashing, with a gap of thirty lengths back to the other eleven finishers. After the race, Marcus Armytage, writing in the Daily Telegraph described Un de Sceaux as "the most exciting chaser seen in Ireland in ages" and compared his racing style to that of Desert Orchid. In January he was moved up to Grade 1 class for the Arkle Novice Chase at Leopardstown Racecourse. He started favourite against two opponents: the Racing Post Novice Chase winner Clarcam and the Shannon Airport Novice Chase winner Gilgamboa. He took the lead from the start as usual and drew away in the straight to win by fifteen lengths. Comparing the winner to previous champion two-milers he had ridden, Walsh said "He doesn't stop and he doesn't quit and he'll find plenty for a smack if needed. I loved the way he goes at fences and never backs off. He's more like Azertyuiop than Master Minded. Azertyuiop took a bit of riding and this fella's the same".

On 10 March 2015, Un de Sceaux started 4/6 favourite for the Arkle Challenge Trophy on the opening day of the Cheltenham Festival. Clarcam was again in opposition but the betting suggested that his main danger would come from the Paul Nicholls-trained Vibrato Valtat, who had won the Henry VIII Novices' Chase, Wayward Lad Novices' Chase and the Kingmaker Novices' Chase in his last three races. Un de Sceaux took his customary early lead and shook off the challenge of Vibrato Valtat approaching the second last. He jumped the last two lengths clear of God's Own before drawing away in the closing stages to win by six lengths. After the race, Mullins said "He's not a typical racehorse and I don't think he's any pedigree, either, which is extraordinary. He is what we call a pure freak". The gelding ended his season in the Ryanair Novice Chase at Punchestown on 30 April and started the 1/10 favourite against four opponents. He led from the start and won by three lengths from the British challenger Just Cameron.

=== 2015/16 National Hunt season: steeplechases ===
After an absence of almost eight months, Un de Sceaux returned in the Grade 1 Paddy Power Dial-A-Bet Chase at Leopardstown on 27 December. Starting at odds of 1/4 against five opponents he went to the front from the start and was still clear of his rivals when he fell at the second last fence. On 23 January he was matched against the 2014 Queen Mother Champion Chase winner Sire de Grugy in the Clarence House Chase at Ascot Racecourse and was made the 1/2 favourite. After leading from the start he shook off a challenge from Sire de Grugy approaching the last fence and drew away on the flat to win by five lengths. Mullins commented "He just settled into his own rhythm and he jumped in his own time... Ruby sat there and let him sort himself out. It was much better today".

On his second appearance at the Cheltenham Festival Un de Sceaux started 4/6 favourite for the Queen Mother Champion Chase. He took the lead four fences from the finish but was overtaken approaching the final turn and finished second, three and a half lengths behind Sprinter Sacre. He faced Sprinter Sacre again in the Celebration Chase at Sandown but made numerous jumping errors and was beaten fifteen lengths into second. Un de Sceaux was sent to France for a summer campaign beginning with the Prix La Barka at Auteuil on 21 May. Racing on very soft ground he was among the leaders from the start and drew away in the closing stages to win "very comfortably" by eight lengths from Le Grand Luce. Three weeks later the gelding was stepped up in distance for France's premier hurdle race, the Grande Course de Haies d'Auteuil over 5100 metres. He started favourite and disputed the lead for most of the way but weakened from the second last obstacle and finished sixth behind the British-trained Ptit Zig.

=== 2016/17 National Hunt season: steeplechases ===
Un de Sceaux began the 2016/17 National Hunt season in the Tingle Creek Chase at Sandown Park on 3 December and started 5/4 favourite ahead of Sire de Grugy, God's Own (Punchestown Champion Chase) and Ar Mad (Henry VIII Novices' Chase). After racing in second place behind Ar Mad he took the lead but jumped poorly at the last and was overtaken by Sire de Grugy. He rallied strongly on the run-in, regained the advantage and won by a length and a neck from Sire de Grugy and God's Own. In January he attempted to repeat his 2016 success in the Clarence House Chase and started 1/2 favourite ahead of six opponents. He took the lead at the tenth fence and stayed on well to win by five lengths from the Ryanair Chase winner Uxizandre with Dodging Bullets and Special Tiara in fourth and fifth.

In the Ryanair Chase at Cheltenham on 16 March Un de Sceaux started favourite against seven opponents. He put in an exuberant display of jumping under Ruby Walsh to win by 1 and a half lengths from Sub Lieutenant to complete three grade ones in a row for Willie Mullins Iron Horse. Un de Sceaux attempted to make it four grade ones in a row in the Boylesports Punchestown Champion Chase. However he met stiff opposition from the Colin Tizzard trained Fox Norton and suffered his first defeat of the campaign finishing second by almost 2 lengths.

=== 2017/18 National Hunt season: steeplechases ===
In the 2017/18 season Un de Sceaux ran five times, achieving four victories (the Hilly Way Chase, the Clarence House Chase, the Devenish Chase and the Punchestown Champion Chase) and one second place. His one defeat of the season came at the Cheltenham Festival, where he started odds-on favourite in the Ryanair Chase but was beaten four and a half lengths by Balko des Flos.

=== 2018/19 National Hunt season: steeplechases ===
Un de Sceaux had just three outings in the 2018/19 season. In his first race of the season he was beaten four lengths into second place by the odds-on favourite Altior in the Tingle Creek Chase. He then came fifth in the Ryanair Chase, beaten eight and a half lengths by Frodon. The season ended on a winning note as he retained his crown in the Punchestown Champion Chase, beating stablemate and odds-on favourite, Min, by four lengths.

=== 2019/20 National Hunt season: steeplechases ===
In his first race of the season, the Tingle Creek Chase, Un de Sceaux was denied victory by the favourite Defi Du Seuil by just a neck. He then started 11/10 joint favourite with Defi Du Seuil in the Clarence House Chase, and was again beaten by him into second place.

In February 2020 twelve-year-old Un de Sceaux was preparing for the Queen Mother Champion Chase when he suffered a suspensory ligament injury and Mullins announced his retirement. The trainer said: "He was a fantastic racehorse first over hurdles and then over fences and gave us and his owners, the O'Connell family, many great days. He's 12 but was still showing all the enthusiasm he displayed throughout his career." Un de Sceaux had won 23 of his 34 starts, including ten Grade 1 victories. Ruby Walsh had ridden him on 15 winning occasions and Paul Townend on three occasions, while Barry Geraghty, David Mullins and amateur Patrick Mullins each secured one win over jumps on him. He was ridden out at home by Virginie Bascop.

In April 2020 Un de Sceaux left Ireland for his retirement in France.

== Death ==
On June 16, Un de Sceaux died due to a Paddock Accident.

== Pedigree ==
Pedigree of Un de Sceaux, bay gelding, 2008
Sire Denham Red (FR) 1992	Pampabird (IRE); 1979	Pampapaul	Yellow God
Sire Denham Red (FR) 1992	Pampabird (IRE); 1979	Pampapaul	Pampalina
Sire Denham Red (FR) 1992	Pampabird (IRE); 1979	Wood Grouse	Celtic Ash
Sire Denham Red (FR) 1992	Pampabird (IRE); 1979	Wood Grouse	French Bird
Sire Denham Red (FR) 1992	Nativelee (FR); 1982	Giboulee	Northern Dancer
Sire Denham Red (FR) 1992	Nativelee (FR); 1982	Giboulee	Victory Chant
Sire Denham Red (FR) 1992	Nativelee (FR); 1982	Native Berry	Ribero
Sire Denham Red (FR) 1992	Nativelee (FR); 1982	Native Berry	Noble Native
Dam Hotesse de Sceaux (FR) 1995	April Night (FR); 1986	Kaldoun	Caro
Dam Hotesse de Sceaux (FR) 1995	April Night (FR); 1986	Kaldoun	Katana
Dam Hotesse de Sceaux (FR) 1995	April Night (FR); 1986	My Destiny	Chaparral
Dam Hotesse de Sceaux (FR) 1995	April Night (FR); 1986	My Destiny	Carmelite
Dam Hotesse de Sceaux (FR) 1995	Olympe Occitane (FR); 1980	Diarifos	Dionysos
Dam Hotesse de Sceaux (FR) 1995	Olympe Occitane (FR); 1980	Diarifos	Diana
Dam Hotesse de Sceaux (FR) 1995	Olympe Occitane (FR); 1980	Papadiketeme	Klairon
Dam Hotesse de Sceaux (FR) 1995	Olympe Occitane (FR); 1980	Papadiketeme	Gorda (Family 16-g)

== See also ==
Repeat winners of horse races
