= Sidney Banks Memorial Novices' Hurdle =

Hurdle horse race in Britain

Sidney Banks Memorial Novices' Hurdle
2026
| Act Of Innocence | Glance At Midnight | Sinnatra |

Previous years
2025
Califet En Vol | No Questions Asked | Jax Junior
2024
Handstands | Jango Baie | Bugise Seagull
2023
Marble Sands | Rare Edition | Ginny's Destiny
2022
Elle Est Belle | Gentleman At Arms | Jerrash
2021
Minella Drama | Stoner's Choice | Optimise Prime

2020-2011
2020
Shishkin | Shan Blue | Up The Straight
2018
Vinndication | Western Ryder | Theclockisticking
2017
Keeper Hill | Messire Des Obeaux | Tommy Rapper
2016
Ma du Fou | North Hill Harvey | Final Nudge
2015
Different Gravey | A Vos Gardes | Kylemore Lough
2014
Mosspark | Spirit of Shankly | Carraig Mor
2013
Easter Day | Nataani | Kilmurvy
2012
Golden Gael | Nagpur | All The Aces
2011
Aikman | Minella Class | Pride in Battle

2010-2001
2010
The Minack | Sarando | Master of the Hall
2009
Time For Rupert | Cracboumwiz | Helpston
2008
Hold Em | Junior | Lightning Strike
2007
My Turn Now | Lightning Strike | Shardakhan
2006
Refinement | Raffaello | Mith Hill
2005
Gold Medallist | Pole Star | Waltzing Beau
2002
Another Chance | First Love | Junkanoo
2001
Southern Star | Rouble | Cruise The Fairway

2000-1991
2000
Crocadee | Kattegat | Hadidi
1998
French Holly | Better Offer | Mr Markham
1997
Agistment | Forest Ivory | Emerald Statement
1995
Nahthen Lad | Deduce | Roberty Lea
1994
Seekin Cash | Relkeel | Czar Nicholas
1993
Hebridean | High Alltitude | Grand Hawk
1992
Sendai | Travado | Ambrose

1990-1988
1989
| Celtic Barle | Brabazon | Patrico |
1988
| Nick The Brief | Matbar | Relatively Easy |

The Sidney Banks Memorial Novices' Hurdle is a National Hunt Listed novice hurdle race in England which is open to horses aged four years or older. It is run at Huntingdon over a distance of about 2 miles and 3½ furlongs (2 miles 3 furlongs and 137 yards or 3,947 metres), and it is scheduled to take place each year in February.

The race was first run in 1976 and named after local racehorse trainer Sidney Banks, who died in 1973. His son, Michael Banks, was a chairman of Huntingdon Racecourse.

== Winners ==
| Year | Winner | Age | Jockey | Trainer |
|---|---|---|---|---|
| 1976 | Grand Canyon | 6 | Derek Kent | Peter Haynes |
| 1977 | Abandoned because of waterlogged state of course |
| 1978 | Abandoned because of frost |
| 1979 | Abandoned because of waterlogged state of course |
| 1980 | Abandoned because of flooding |
| 1981 | Glamour Show | 5 | Bob Champion | Josh Gifford |
| 1982 | Angelo Salvini | 6 | Alan Brown | Peter Easterby |
| 1983 | Abandoned because of snow |
| 1984 | The Pawn | 5 | Hywel Davies | Mick Ryan |
| 1985 | Sheer Gold | 5 | Brian Reilly | Toby Balding |
| 1986 | Abandoned because of snow and frost |
| 1987 | Robin Goodfellow | 6 | Graham Bradley | Toby Balding |
| 1988 | Nick The Brief | 6 | Edward Buckley | Terry Casey |
| 1989 | Celtic Barle | 5 | Martin Lynch | Terry Casey |
| 1990 | Abandoned due to waterlogged state of course |
| 1991 | Abandoned due to frost |
| 1992 | Sendai | 6 | Declan Murphy | Josh Gifford |
| 1993 | Hebridean | 6 | Richard Dunwoody | David Nicholson |
| 1994 | Seekin Cash | 5 | Jamie Osborne | Charles Egerton |
| 1995 | Nahthen Lad | 6 | Warren Marston | Jenny Pitman |
| 1996 | Abandoned due to frost |
| 1997 | Agistment | 6 | Richard Dunwoody | Jimmy FitzGerald |
| 1998 | French Holly | 7 | Andrew Thornton | Ferdy Murphy |
| 1999 | Abandoned due to frost |
| 2000 | Crocadee | 7 | Norman Williamson | Venetia Williams |
| 2001 | Southern Star | 6 | Jim Culloty | Henrietta Knight |
| 2002 | Another Chance | 7 | A S Smith | Malcolm Jefferson |
| 2003 | Abandoned due to frost |
| 2004 | Abandoned due to frost |
| 2005 | Gold Medallist | 5 | Richard Johnson | Philip Hobbs |
| 2006 | Refinement | 7 | Noel Fehily | Jonjo O'Neill |
| 2007 | My Turn Now | 5 | Noel Fehily | Charlie Mann |
| 2008 | Hold Em | 6 | Timmy Murphy | Keith Goldsworthy |
| 2009 | Time For Rupert | 5 | Will Kennedy | Paul Webber |
| 2010 | The Minack | 6 | Nick Scholfield | Paul Nicholls |
| 2011 | Aikman | 7 | Harry Haynes | James Ewart |
| 2012 | Golden Gael | 6 | Nick Scholfield | Jeremy Scott |
| 2013 | Easter Day | 5 | Daryl Jacob | Paul Nicholls |
| 2014 | Mosspark | 6 | Aidan Coleman | Emma Lavelle |
| 2015 | Different Gravey | 5 | Barry Geraghty | Nicky Henderson |
| 2016 | Ma Du Fou | 6 | Gavin Sheehan | Warren Greatrex |
| 2017 | Keeper Hill | 6 | Gavin Sheehan | Warren Greatrex |
| 2018 | Vinndication | 5 | David Bass | Kim Bailey |
| | no race 2019 (Note: The 2019 race was cancelled because of an equine influenza outbreak) |
| 2020 | Shishkin | 6 | Nico de Boinville | Nicky Henderson |
| 2021 | Minella Drama (Note: The 2021 running took place at Market Rasen after the original fixture was cancelled due to flooding.) | 6 | Brian Hughes | Donald McCain |
| 2022 | Elle Est Belle | 6 | Harry Skelton | Dan Skelton |
| 2023 | Marble Sands | 7 | Kielan Woods | Fergal O'Brien |
| 2024 | Handstands | 5 | Harry Cobden | Ben Pauling |
| 2025 | Califet En Vol | 6 | Nico de Boinville | Nicky Henderson |

== See also ==
- Horse racing in Great Britain
- List of British National Hunt races
