= 2015 Queen Mother Champion Chase =

The 2015 Queen Mother Champion Chase (known as the Betway Queen Mother Champion Chase for sponsorship reasons) was a horse race held at Cheltenham Racecourse on Wednesday 11 March 2015. It was the 56th annual running of the Queen Mother Champion Chase.

== Build up ==
Three of the previous four winners of this race were competing in the 2015 race. They were reigning champion Sire de Grugy, 2013 winner Sprinter Sacre, who missed the 2014 race due to an irregular heartbeat, and 2011 winner Sizing Europe.

== The race ==
Special Tiara made most of the running with Dodging Bullets always looking comfortable with the pace just behind the leader. Dodging Bullets took the lead at the last fence. Somersby challenged strongly near the end to finish second with Special Tiara finishing third. Sprinter Sacre, who looked in contention with three fences to jump, was pulled up just before the last fence.

== Details ==
- Sponsor: Betway
- Winner's prize money: £199,325.00
- Going: Good, Good to Soft in places.
- Number of runners: 9
- Winner's time: 3 minutes 53.30 seconds

== Full result ==
Pos.	Marg.	Horse (bred)	Age	Jockey	Trainer (Country)	Odds
1		Dodging Bullets (GB)	7	Sam Twiston-Davies	Paul Nicholls (GB)	9/2
2	1¼	Somersby (IRE)	11	Brian Hughes	Mick Channon (GB)	33/1
3	1¾	Special Tiara (GB)	8	Noel Fehily	Henry de Bromhead (IRE)	18/1
4	7	Sire de Grugy (FR)	9	Jamie Moore	Gary Moore (GB)	5/2
5	7	Simply Ned (IRE)	8	Brian Harding	Nicky Richards (GB)	14/1
6	4½	Savello (IRE)	9	Bryan Cooper	Tony Martin (IRE)	40/1
7	9	Sizing Europe (IRE)	13	Johnny Burke	Henry de Bromhead (IRE)	22/1
8	7	Mr Mole (IRE)	7	Tony McCoy	Paul Nicholls (GB)	13/2
PU		Sprinter Sacre (FR)	9	Barry Geraghty	Nicky Henderson (GB)	9/4 fav
NR		Champagne Fever (IRE)	8	Ruby Walsh	Willie Mullins (IRE)
NR		Clarcam (FR)	5	Davy Condon	Gordon Elliott (IRE)

- Abbreviations: nse = nose; nk = neck; hd = head; dist = distance

== Winner's details ==
Further details of the winner, Dodging Bullets

- Sex: Gelding
- Foaled: 16 April 2008
- Country: United Kingdom
- Sire: Dubawi; Dam: Nova Cyngi (Kris S)
- Owner: R A Pegum, Martin Brougton & Friends
- Breeder: Frankie Dettori
