= Shishkin (horse) =

Irish-bred Thoroughbred racehorse

- Racing silks of Mrs J Donnelly
- Sire: Sholokhov
- Dam: Labarynth
- Damsire: Exit To Nowhere
- Sex: Gelding
- Foaled: 4 April 2014
- Country: Ireland
- Breeder: C J & E B Bennett
- Owner: Mrs J Donnelly
- Trainer: Nicky Henderson
- Record: 21: 14-1-2
- Earnings: £798,668

Major wins
- Sidney Banks Memorial Novices' Hurdle (2020); Supreme Novices' Hurdle (2020); Arkle Challenge Trophy (2021); Maghull Novices' Chase (2021); Clarence House Chase (2022); Ascot Chase (2023); Aintree Bowl (2023)

Shishkin (4 April 2014 – 28 April 2024) was an Irish-bred British-trained thoroughbred racehorse who competed in National Hunt races. A dual Cheltenham Festival winner, he won 14 of his 21 races including six Grade 1s with his best performance generally regarded as the Clarence House Chase victory over Energumene. He was trained by Nicky Henderson and ridden by Nico de Boinville.

== Racing career ==
After two point-to-points in 2018, Shishkin began racing under rules with a bumper win at Kempton in March 2019. He raced as a novice hurdler during the 2019/20 season, falling on his hurdling debut at Newbury, before securing a maiden win a month later. After a 11-length success in the Sidney Banks Memorial Novices' Hurdle he was favourite for the Supreme Novices' Hurdle at Cheltenham. His odds drifted on the eve of the Festival but Shishkin overcame a "troubled passage" during the race to win in a photo finish from Abacadabras.

Shishkin was switched to fences for the 2020/21 season, in novice chase company he had three easy victories prior to the Cheltenham Festival including in the Wayward Lad and Lightning Novices' Chase. He began the Arkle Trophy at Cheltenham as odds-on favourite and delivered an impressive 12-length victory. A fifth success of the season followed at Aintree with the Maghull Novices' Chase.

Shishkin's start to the 2021/22 season was delayed with Henderson choosing not to run him in the Tingle Creek Chase. He re-appeared at Kempton for the Desert Orchid Chase where he record a ninth straight victory. He then faced unbeaten Irish two-miler chaser Energumene in a much anticipated clash in the Clarence House Chase at Ascot. Energumene led and set a strong pace throughout with Shishkin working hard to keep in touch, he cleared the last fence still trailing but kept on to win by a length. Jockey de Boinville rated it as one of the best races he had ridden in. Both horses lined-up for a rematch in the Queen Mother Champion Chase but Shishkin put in a disappointing performance and was pulled up halfway through the race. The initial reason for this was the heavy ground but later tests showed that Shishkin had a rare bone condition.

Shishkin returned to racing seven months later at the Tingle Creek, after finishing a distance third Henderson assessed that he now needed to race further than two miles. His next race was the Ascot Chase, the longer distance of two miles five furlongs bringing about a return to form as he won by 16 lengths. A month later at the Cheltenham Festival he made several jumping errors in finishing second to Envoi Allen in the Ryanair Chase. His season concluded with a first run over three miles in the Aintree Bowl, which he won after rallying late on to beat Ahoy Senor.

The 2023/24 season for Shishkin was set to begin with the 1965 Chase at Ascot but the horse planted himself at the start and refused to race. His next outing, the King George VI Chase, was no less eventual as he led by a length jumping the second last fence before stumbling and unseating jockey de Boinville. Shishkin returned to winning ways with victory in the Denman Chase which left Henderson to target the Cheltenham Gold Cup. He was among a number of Henderson horses withdrawn from their Festival races after an unsatisfactory scope. He came fourth in the Aintree Bowl on 11 April 2024, in what would prove to be his final race. Henderson announced the death of Shishkin on 28 April 2024; he was euthanized following fracturing his hind leg after getting stuck in his box.
