= Sharp Novices' Hurdle =

Hurdle horse race in Britain

Sharp Novices' Hurdle (Sky Bet Novices' Hurdle)
- Class: Grade 2
- Location: Cheltenham Racecourse; Cheltenham, England
- Race type: Hurdle race
- Sponsor: Oddschecker
- Website: Cheltenham

Race information
- Distance: 2m 87y (3,298 metres)
- Surface: Turf
- Track: Left-handed
- Qualification: Four-years-old and up
- Weight: 11 st 1 lb (4yo); 11 st 2 lb (5yo+); Allowances; 7 lb for fillies and mares Penalties; 5 lb for winners of a Class 1 wfa hurdle 3 lb for winners of a Class 2 wfa or Class 1 handicap hurdle
- Purse: £80,000 (2025); 1st: £47,552

Sharp Novices' Hurdle
2026
Kingofthefrontier	Planters Punch	Cooltobecareless

Previous years
2025
Fortune De Mer	Doctor Blue	Jaminska
2024
Valgrand	Gale Mahler	Dancing In Paris
2023
Lookaway	Kamsinas	Idy Wood
2022
Fennor Cross	Ukantango	Springwell Bay
2021
I Like To Move It	Washington	Only two finished

2020-2011
2020
For Pleasure	Third Time Lucki	Jungle Junction
2019
Hang In There	Pacify	Ecco
2018
Elixir De Nutz	Itchy Feet	Seddon
2017
Slate House	Summerville Boy	Better Getalong
2016
Moon Racer	Mirsaale	Ballyandy
2015
Altior	Maputo	Simon Squirrel
2014
Vyta Du Roc	Emerging Talent	Pyromaniac
2013
The Liquidator	Sea Lord	Minellaforleisure
2012
Dodging Bullets	River Maigue	Court Minstrel
2011
Steps To Freedom	Prospect Wells	Ericht

2010-2001
2010
Cue Card	Dunraven Storm	Ballyadam Brook
2009
Loosen My Load	Some Present	Secret Dancer
2008
Golan Way	Over Sixty	American Trilogy
2007
I'msingingtheblues	Snap Tie	Dark Bolero
2006
Moon Over Miami	War General	Mill House Girl
2005
Boychuk	Buena Vista	Two Miles West
2004
Marcel	Baby Run	Shuhood
2003
Self Defense	Albuhera	Contraband
2002
Mutakarrim	Jaboune	Sud Bleu
2001
Fireball Macnamara	Midland Flame	Springhill

2000-1991
2000
Reiziger	Palouse	Aerleon Pete
1999
Silence Reigns	Doctor Goddard	Doon Run
1998
Hoh Invader	Ashley Muck	Rathbawn Prince
1997
Circus Star	Mr Markham	Polydamas
1996
Kailash	Herbert Lodge	Green Green Desert
1995
Mandys Mantino	Call Equiname	Blair Castle
1994
Berude Not To	Herbert Lodge	Sexton Grey
1993
Large Action	Fatack	Morceli
1992
Satin Lover	Dreamers Delight	Book of Music
1991
Thetford Forest	Song Of Sixpence	First Avenue
1989
Run For Free	Xhai	Telemahos
1988
Green Willow	Greenhills Joy	Lalitpour
1987
Butt And Ben	Gunner Stream	Combermere

The Sharp Novices' Hurdle is a Grade 2 National Hunt hurdle race in Great Britain which is open to horses aged four years or older. It is run on the Old Course at Cheltenham over a distance of about 2 miles and half a furlong (2 miles and 87 yards, or 3,298 m), and during its running there are eight hurdles to be jumped. The race is for novice hurdlers, and it is scheduled to take place each year in October.

The event was formerly contested over 2 miles, and it used to be held in December. It was extended by a furlong in 1992, and it was cut to its present length and moved to November in 1994. In 2011 the race was renamed as the Opus Energy Novices' Hurdle as part of a sponsorship deal with UK power supplier Opus Energy. Since 2025 the race has been sponsored by Oddschecker and run as the Oddschecker Novices' Hurdle.

In April 2023 the British Horseracing Authority announced that the race would be run in October as part of a restructure of the 2023/24 programme.

== Winners ==
Year	Winner	Age	Jockey	Trainer
1988	Green Willow	6	Peter Hobbs	Josh Gifford
1989	Run for Free	5	Peter Scudamore	Martin Pipe
1990	Abandoned due to snow
1991	Thetford Forest	4	Richard Dunwoody	David Nicholson
1992	Satin Lover	4	Graham McCourt	Nigel Tinkler
1993	Large Action	5	Jamie Osborne	Oliver Sherwood
1994	Berude Not To	5	Jamie Osborne	Oliver Sherwood
1995	Mandys Mantino	5	Philip Hide	Josh Gifford
1996	Kailash	5	Tony McCoy	Martin Pipe
1997	Circus Star	4	Adrian Maguire	David Nicholson
1998	Hoh Invader	6	Richard Dunwoody	Charlie Mann
1999	Silence Reigns	5	Mick Fitzgerald	Paul Nicholls
2000	Reiziger	4	Richard Johnson	Philip Hobbs
2001	Fireball Macnamara	5	Timmy Murphy	Mark Pitman
2002	Mutakarrim	5	Paul Carberry	Dermot Weld
2003	Self Defense	6	Barry Keniry	Emma Lavelle
2004	Marcel	4	Timmy Murphy	Martin Pipe
2005	Boychuk	4	Richard Johnson	Philip Hobbs
2006	Moon Over Miami	5	Noel Fehily	Charlie Mann
2007	I'msingingtheblues	5	Ruby Walsh	Paul Nicholls
2008	Golan Way	4	Jamie Goldstein	Sheena West
2009	Loosen My Load	5	Andrew Lynch	Henry de Bromhead
2010	Cue Card	4	Joe Tizzard	Colin Tizzard
2011	Steps to Freedom	5	Robbie Power	Jessica Harrington
2012	Dodging Bullets	4	Ruby Walsh	Paul Nicholls
2013	The Liquidator	5	Tom Scudamore	David Pipe
2014	Vyta Du Roc	5	Barry Geraghty	Nicky Henderson
2015	Altior	5	Nico de Boinville	Nicky Henderson
2016	Moon Racer	7	Tom Scudamore	David Pipe
2017	Slate House	5	Harry Cobden	Colin Tizzard
2018	Elixir de Nutz	4	Harry Cobden	Colin Tizzard
2019	Hang In There	5	Adam Wedge	Emma Lavelle
2020	For Pleasure	5	Harry Bannister	Alex Hales
2021	I Like To Move It	4	Sam Twiston-Davies	Nigel Twiston-Davies
2022	Fennor Cross	5	Simon Torrens	John McConnell
2023	Lookaway	6	Jack Quinlan	Neil King
2024	Valgrand	6	Harry Skelton	Dan Skelton
2025	Fortune De Mer	5	Harry Skelton	Dan Skelton
2026	Kingofthefrontier	5	Conor O'Farrell	John Dawson

== See also ==
- Horse racing in Great Britain
- List of British National Hunt races
