= Pearlyman =

British-bred Thoroughbred racehorse

- Sire: Mandamus
- Dam: Pearlyric
- Damsire: Eastern Lyric
- Sex: Gelding
- Foaled: 1979
- Country: Great Britain
- Colour: Bay
- Breeder: Bill Jenks
- Owner: Mrs P Shaw
- Trainer: John Edwards

Major wins
- Grand Annual Chase (1986); Queen Mother Champion Chase (1987, 1988) Game Spirit Chase (1987); Castleford Chase (1987)

Pearlyman (foaled 1979) was a British-bred racehorse who developed into an outstanding steeplechaser over distances of around two miles. His biggest successes came when winning both the 1987 and 1988 runnings of the Queen Mother Champion Chase. Having also won the Grand Annual Chase in 1986, he is in a select band of horses who have won at the Cheltenham Festival in three consecutive years. He had fragile forelegs and was pin fired early in his career. When at his best, his performances were marked by his ability to quicken in the later stages of a race.

== Background ==
Pearlyman had a distinctive white mark down his face. He was sired by Mandamus, a very useful one mile handicapper on the flat who was trained by Bernard van Cutsem. Pearlyman’s dam was a winning hurdler.

== 1982/1983 season ==
Pearlyman began his career in the Shropshire yard of Bill Jenks, who also bred him. He ran twice in juvenile hurdle races during this season. After being brought down on his debut, he then finished third at Stratford in March.

== 1983/1984 season ==
Still with Bill Jenks, Pearlyman ran only twice again. He was not seen out after finishing runner-up in a novice hurdle at Wolverhampton in November.

== 1984/1985 season ==
Pearlyman had now moved to the Ross-on-Wye stables of John Edwards, where he remained for the rest of his career. He appeared just once during this season, winning a novice hurdle at Wincanton in November with Paul Barton aboard.

== 1985/1986 season ==
Pearlyman switched to fences at the beginning of this season. He ran seven times, winning on five occasions, culminating in victories at both the big Cheltenham and Aintree meetings. He reappeared in a novices' chase at Wolverhampton on Boxing Day. Described as ‘backward’ in appearance by the Raceform representative at the course, Pearlyman drew clear to win the race by twenty lengths. He was then raised in class and lined up for an event at Ascot the following month. Both of his two opponents, including the highly promising Desert Orchid who started the warm favourite, failed to complete the course leaving Pearlyman to come home alone. He appeared again the following week at Kempton Park where he completed a hat-trick, leading at the tenth fence and winning by fifteen lengths. The merit of this performance also hard to gauge as the first and second favourites both fell during the race. Pearlyman returned to Ascot in February and suffered his first defeat over fences. He made a mistake at the eighth fence and came home in fourth place, fifteen lengths behind the winner, Charcoal Wally. Pearlyman was then put into open handicap company for his next outing which came in the nineteen-runner Grand Annual Chase at the Cheltenham Festival in March. With Graham Bradley deputising for Barton, Pearlyman started at 14/1, led at the final fence and passed the post three lengths ahead of his nearest rival. Barton was back aboard for when Pearlyman was next seen in a valuable novices chase at Aintree. Leading after halfway, Pearlyman pulled away from his opponents to pass the line twelve lengths ahead of Malya Mal. On his final outing of the season, Pearlyman narrowly failed to concede 10 pound (lb) to Amber Rambler in another valuable novice chase at Ayr, where he stumbled at the second last.

== 1986/1987 season ==
Pearlyman won three of his five starts including the Queen Mother Champion Chase, the championship race for two-mile chasers. He reappeared in a handicap at Cheltenham in December, carrying top weight of 11 stone (st) 13 lb and starting at 6/1, which indicated that he was being set a stiff task on his first outing of the season. Pearlyman won comfortably by seven lengths from French Union, to whom he was conceding 17 lb. He next lined up in the Castleford Chase at Wetherby over the Christmas period. Carrying 12 st 3 lb, he unseated Paul Barton at an early stage of the race. Connections then decided to run Pearlyman at Cheltenham on New Year's Eve in a similar event where he failed to jump fluently and finished a disappointing last of the six runners behind Townley Stone. Pearlyman returned to his best when next seen in the Game Spirit Chase at Newbury in February. With top weight again, and with Peter Scudamore given the mount, Pearlyman came away from his rivals in the later stages of the race to win comfortably from Townley Stone and Little Bay. The Timeform organisation described the performance as the best performance in a two-mile handicap chase of the past few seasons. Seven rivals opposed Pearlyman in the 1987 Queen Mother Champion Chase. He went off the 13/8 favourite, followed in the betting by Very Promising and Desert Orchid. Townley Stone and Little Bay were also in the line up. With Scudamore retaining the ride, Pearlyman jumped the final fence marginally ahead of Very Promising with the long time leader Desert Orchid close behind. Very Promising drew level with Pearlyman soon after and a duel ensued up the run in with Pearlyman hitting the front again in the last half furlong and holding on to win by a neck, with Desert Orchid another three lengths away in third. Pearlyman had one more outing which came in a valuable handicap at the Aintree Grand National meeting, where he unseated Scudamore. Pearlyman ended the season with a Timeform rating of 171, and was their champion two mile chaser of the season.

== 1987/1988 season ==
Pearlyman ran seven times winning on three occasions, including his second Queen Mother Champion Chase. Peter Scudamore partnered him on his first three starts, and Tom Morgan in the remaining four races. Morgan would partner Pearlyman for the remainder of the horse's career. On his seasonal debut at Devon and Exeter where he failed by two and a half lengths to give 8 lb away to Very Promising, Raceform described his physical appearance as a ‘ bit backward ’. Pearlyman returned to winning form on his next outing in a handicap at Cheltenham in November, where he beat Baluchi and Karenomore, conceding 35 lb to the runner up. He them reappeared eight days later at Ascot, facing another stiff task under top weight. On this occasion he could only finish third of the five runners, behind Long Engagement and Far Bridge. Pearlyman’s next outing came over Christmas, when he won the Castleford Chase at Wetherby. With Tom Morgan in the saddle, he led four fences from the finish and came home five lengths clear of Little Bay, conceding 24 lb to his nearest rival, a very useful chaser in his own right. As in the previous season, the Game Spirit Chase was chosen as Pearlyman’s prep race for Cheltenham. Renewing rivalry with his now established adversary Very Promising, Pearlyman led two fences from home but was passed by Very Promising approaching the final fence, and came home seven lengths adrift of the winner, who was carrying 8 lb less. Eight runners lined up for the 1988 running of the Queen Mother Champion Chase which was run in heavy ground. Pearlyman started the 15/8 favourite ahead of the Irish trained Weather The Storm at 100/30. Then came Very Promising at 4/1, and Desert Orchid and Long Engagement both at 9/1. Pearlyman won the race in conclusive style. The Raceform reporter John Sharratt recorded the following comments; ‘ headway 9th, pecked 10th, quickened led last’. Pearlyman crossed the line five lengths ahead of Desert Orchid, who had led until after the second last, with Very Promising a further length away in third place. Pearlyman made his final appearance of the season in a valuable thirteen runner handicap at Aintree. Under top weight, he finished a below form seventh. Timeform awarded Pearlyman a rating of 174 for the season, and were of the opinion that he was, "one of the best winners of the Queen Mother Champion Chase in the thirty year history of the race".

== 1989/1990 season ==
Now a ten year old, Pearlyman returned to the track in the Castleford Chase at Wetherby in December 1989. He had missed the whole of the 1988/1989 season due to tendon problems. In a field of five he made a highly encouraging return, the Racing Post close up comments for the run stating, "held up, headway on bit 5th, slight lead two out, headed last, not quicken". He finished a close third to Ida’s Delight and Nohalmdun, only a length away from the winner and conceding a significant amount of weight to the first two home. Pearlyman was next seen in the Victor Chandler Chase at Ascot in January. Under top weight, he finished a never nearer fifth to Meikleour. Pearlyman's next appearance in the 1990 Queen Mother Champion Chase would be the last time he was seen on a racecourse. In a field of nine he started the 6/1 third favourite behind Barnbrook Again and Sabin Du Loir. There was a period during the race when Pearlyman looked the possible winner. In the opinion of Timeform, "he had improved his place steadily from halfway and could be seen travelling strongly in a close fourth". However, Pearlyman then hit the third last fence and was pulled up straight away. It was discovered he had disturbed a previous foreleg injury and was retired. He had worn bandages on his forelegs in all of this three starts during this season. Pearlyman ended the season with a Timeform rating of 163.

== Retirement ==
Pearlyman developed sinus problems during his retirement and was put down in 1996 at the age of seventeen.
