= Altior =

Irish-bred Thoroughbred racehorse

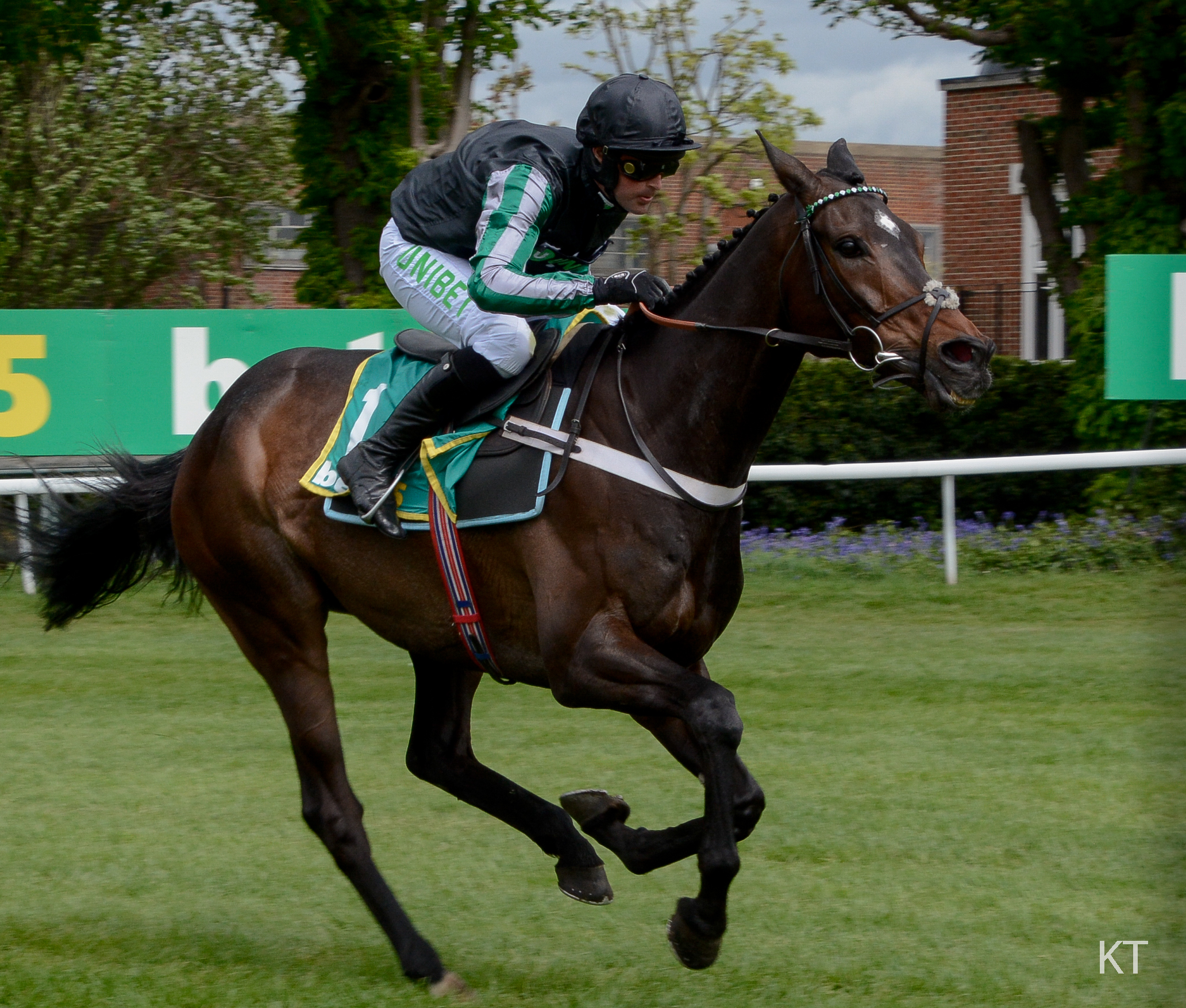
- Altior in the Celebration Chase at Sandown, April 2019
- Sire: High Chaparral
- Grandsire: Sadler's Wells
- Dam: Monte Solaro
- Damsire: Key of Luck
- Sex: Gelding
- Foaled: 6 May 2010
- Country: Ireland
- Colour: Bay
- Breeder: Paddy Behan
- Owner: Patricia Pugh
- Trainer: Nicky Henderson
- Record: 24: 21-1-1
- Earnings: £1,249,710

Major wins
- Sharp Novices' Hurdle (2015); Supreme Novices' Hurdle (2016); Henry VIII Novices' Chase (2016); Wayward Lad Novices' Chase (2016); Game Spirit Chase (2017, 2018, 2020); Arkle Challenge Trophy (2017); Celebration Chase (2017, 2018, 2019); Queen Mother Champion Chase (2018, 2019); Tingle Creek Chase (2018); Desert Orchid Chase (2018); Clarence House Chase (2019)

Altior (foaled 6 May 2010) is an Irish-bred British-trained Thoroughbred racehorse who competed in National Hunt races. After winning one of his three National Hunt Flat races he was unbeaten in five hurdle races including the Supreme Novices' Hurdle at the Cheltenham Festival. He then switched to two-mile steeplechases and remained unbeaten over the next three seasons to set a world record for a jumps horse of 19 consecutive wins. His unbroken run of victories included ten Grade 1 wins, four of them at the Cheltenham Festival. In all, he won 21 times from 26 starts. Trained by Nicky Henderson at the Seven Barrows yard near Lambourn, he was ridden in most of his races by Nico de Boinville. He was retired aged eleven in 2021.

== Background ==
Altior (Latin for "Higher") is a bay gelding with a white star bred in Ireland by Paddy Behan. In June 2013 the three-year-old gelding was auctioned at the Goffs National Hunt sale and was bought for €60,000 by Highflyer Bloodstock. He entered the ownership of Patricia Pugh and was sent into training with Nicky Henderson at Upper Lambourn in Berkshire.

Altior's sire High Chaparral won The Derby in 2002 and the Breeders' Cup Turf in 2002 and 2003. His other progeny included So You Think, Dundeel, Free Eagle and Toronado. His dam Monte Solaro won two National Hunt races and has produced several other winners. She was a distant female line descendant of the influential French broodmare Democratie.

== Racing career ==
=== 2014–2015: National Hunt Flat races ===
Altior began his racing career in a National Hunt Flat race at Market Rasen Racecourse on 18 May in which he started the 4/6 favourite in a seven-runner field. Ridden by Nico de Boinville he led from the start and won in "impressive" style by fourteen lengths. After an absence of nearly nine months the gelding returned in a Listed National Hunt Flat race at Newbury Racecourse. Ridden by Barry Geraghty, he started favourite and finished third behind Barters Hill and Buveur d'Air (also trained by Henderson). He was then sent to Ireland for the Grade 1 Champion INH Flat Race at Punchestown on 29 April and, ridden by K. Harrington, finished sixth of the thirteen runners behind Bellshill.

=== 2015/2016 season: Novice hurdles ===
In the 2015/2016 National Hunt season Altior was campaigned in novice hurdle races. He made his debut over obstacles at Chepstow Racecourse on 10 October and won by thirty-four lengths from Murray Mount. He was ridden by de Boinville, who would go on to ride him in all his races, except for three in November and December 2016 when he was out through injury. Three weeks after his Chepstow victory, Altior won at Ascot Racecourse beating Ch'Tibello by one and a quarter lengths despite making a bad mistake at the final flight of hurdles. On 15 November Altior was moved up in class for the Grade 2 Sharp Novices' Hurdle at Cheltenham Racecourse and started the 2/1 favourite. After racing in second place he took the lead at the second last and held off a strong challenge from Maputo to win by half a length. On 26 December he won again, taking a novice hurdle at Kempton Park Racecourse by thirteen lengths from the Willie Mullins-trained Open Eagle.

On 15 March 2016 Altior made his first appearance at the Cheltenham Festival when he was one of fourteen horses to contest the Supreme Novices' Hurdle and started the 4/1 second favourite behind Min, an Irish gelding who had won the Moscow Flyer Novice Hurdle on his last start. The other runners included Buveur d'Air, Bellshill, Charbel and Petit Mouchoir. After racing in mid-division, he began to make progress after the fifth of the eight hurdles and took the lead approaching the final obstacle. He accelerated away from his rivals to win by seven lengths from Min, with his stablemate Buveur d'Air taking third place. After the race Henderson said "He always looked to be in the right place, Nico gave him a great ride. I was always happy and he's very good. He and Buveur D'Air have both run cracking races" while de Boinville commented "I was seriously impressed... We know he stays and that's what he did. I think he outstayed them."

=== 2016/2017 season: novice steeplechases ===
The 2016/2017 National Hunt season saw Altior competing in novice chases starting with the Starlight Novice's Chase at Kempton on 21 November which he won by sixty-three lengths at odds of 2/13. He was ridden by Noel Fehily as a replacement for the injured de Boinville. Henderson commented that he had been considering aiming the horse at the Champion Hurdle and added "he's got serious pace. You could win a Flat race with Altior any day you like". Two weeks later he started at odds of 2/7 when he was moved up in class for the Grade 1 Henry VIII Novices' Chase at Sandown Park. After racing in third place, he took the lead after jumping the final fence and "sprinted clear" to win by four lengths from Charbel. Fehily said "I was most impressed with him going to the last, I was a length down, he winged it and in two strides he was three lengths clear. I thought it was very impressive". The Grade 2 Wayward Lad Novices' Chase at Kempton saw Altior, ridden by Fehily, start at odds of 1/9 against three opponents. He took the lead at the third last fence and won "very easily" by eighteen lengths from Marracudja. After the race Henderson said "I think he is a very good horse. Going round here on his first chase he was good and at Sandown he was also good. Today you could see he had really worked it out. What he did just now was really 10 out of 10".

On 11 February 2017 Altior, with de Boinville back in the saddle, was matched against more experienced chasers in the Game Spirit Chase at Newbury in which his opponents were Dodging Bullets, Fox Norton (Summit Juvenile Hurdle, Cheltenham Chase) and Traffic Fluide. Starting at odds of 30/100 and ridden as on his three previous starts by Fehily he led for most of the way, drew clear of his rivals at the fourth-last fence and won by fourteen lengths from Fox Norton.

Having won nine successive races, Altior returned to the Cheltenham Festival of 14 March 2017 and started the 1/4 favourite for the Arkle Challenge Trophy. The best fancied of his opponents were Royal Caviar, Charbel, Forest Bihan (Lightning Novices' Chase) and Cloudy Dream. After racing in second place, Altior was left in front when Charbel fell and the second last and stayed on well to win by six lengths from Cloudy Dream.

On the final day of the season, at Sandown Park, Altior beat Champion Chase winner Special Tiara by 8 lengths in the Celebration Chase (in which he started 30/100 favourite). Timeform gave Altior a rating of 175p following this performance ranking him as second only to Douvan on 182.

=== 2017/2018 season: steeplechases ===
Henderson identified the Tingle Creek Chase as Altior's first target for the 2017/18 season, with the Queen Mother Champion Chase as his long-term objective. In mid-November however this plan was scrapped when Altior developed a breathing problem which required surgery on his larynx and eliminated him from the Tingle Creek Chase. Henderson commented "hopefully he will be back in time for the Champion Chase at Cheltenham in March and perhaps the other championship races in the spring". The trainer was forced to defend his conduct in the matter, having stated just two days previously that the horse was "totally on target" for the Tingle Creek and then announcing the breathing problem in his blog on the website of online betting firm Unibet.

Altior eventually made his seasonal reappearance on 10 February 2018 in the Game Spirit Chase where he faced two rivals in the Tingle Creek Chase winner Politologue and Valdez. In a race run on very soft going Politologue made most of the running but Altior came to challenge over the last two fences, took the lead at the last and won comfortably by four lengths. Henderson said after the race "If you’d dreamt what would happen, that would just about have been it," Henderson said. "He's just got class. His work is so easy. We’re very lucky to have a wonderful bunch of horses, but we haven’t got much that can go with him. He's done some good bits of work with other horses, but he's just better than them."

=== 2018/2019 season: steeplechases ===
Altior made a winning start to his 2018/2019 season when winning the Tingle Creek Chase at Sandown on 8 December 2018. He ended the calendar year by romping home to win the Desert Orchid Chase on 27 December 2018.

His next start came in the Clarence House Chase at Ascot, he opposed two rivals, Fox Norton and Diego Du Charmil. He led the full way round and was unchallenged winning by 7 lengths, although jumping left.

Altior returned to the Cheltenham Festival and was sent off at odds of 4/11 to retain his Champion Chase crown. Racing behind Saint Calvados and then taking the lead after 3 out, he was briefly headed by Sceau Royal at the last before his trademark turn of speed took him clear to win by one and three quarter lengths from Politologue. He had now won at four consecutive Cheltenham Festivals and matched Big Buck's record of 18 wins in a row.

His final race of the season gave him a third consecutive victory in the Celebration Chase at Sandown. Having made all, he finished two and a half lengths in front of runner-up Sceau Royal.

=== 2019/2020 season: steeplechases ===
Altior's 19-race winning streak was ended at Ascot in November 2019 by Cyrname in the Grade 2 Christy 1965 Chase. He then missed out on running in both the Silviniaco Conti Chase and Clarence House Chase in January after recovering from an abscess but returned to form with a win in Newbury's Game Spirit Chase.

=== 2020/2021 season: steeplechases ===
Altior raced twice in the 2020/2021 season and on both occasions came second. In the Desert Orchid Chase in December he was beaten by Nube Negra, while his attempt to win a fourth Celebration Chase was foiled by Greaneteen.

== Retirement ==
In September 2021, Henderson announced that the eleven-year-old would not race again, but would be retired by his owners "while still at his peak, fit, sound and healthy and ready for a new career". He would spend his retirement with Mick and Chloe Fitzgerald near Lambourn. In early 2023, Altior survived a bout of colic that required two operations.

== Pedigree ==
Pedigree of Altior (IRE), bay gelding, 2010
Sire High Chaparral (IRE) 1999	Sadler's Wells (USA); 1981	Northern Dancer	Nearctic
Sire High Chaparral (IRE) 1999	Sadler's Wells (USA); 1981	Northern Dancer	Natalma
Sire High Chaparral (IRE) 1999	Sadler's Wells (USA); 1981	Fairy Bridge	Bold Reason
Sire High Chaparral (IRE) 1999	Sadler's Wells (USA); 1981	Fairy Bridge	Special
Sire High Chaparral (IRE) 1999	Kasora (IRE); 1993	Darshaan	Shirley Heights
Sire High Chaparral (IRE) 1999	Kasora (IRE); 1993	Darshaan	Delsy
Sire High Chaparral (IRE) 1999	Kasora (IRE); 1993	Kozana	Kris
Sire High Chaparral (IRE) 1999	Kasora (IRE); 1993	Kozana	Koblenza
Dam Monte Solaro (IRE) 2000	Key of Luck (USA); 1991	Chief's Crown	Danzig
Dam Monte Solaro (IRE) 2000	Key of Luck (USA); 1991	Chief's Crown	Six Crowns
Dam Monte Solaro (IRE) 2000	Key of Luck (USA); 1991	Balbonella	Gay Mecene
Dam Monte Solaro (IRE) 2000	Key of Luck (USA); 1991	Balbonella	Ramieres
Dam Monte Solaro (IRE) 2000	Footsteps (IRE); 1991	Broken Hearted	Dara Monarch
Dam Monte Solaro (IRE) 2000	Footsteps (IRE); 1991	Broken Hearted	Smash
Dam Monte Solaro (IRE) 2000	Footsteps (IRE); 1991	Remoosh	Glint of Gold
Dam Monte Solaro (IRE) 2000	Footsteps (IRE); 1991	Remoosh	Rivers Maid (Family 6-b)
