= Clarence House Chase =

Steeplechase horse race in Britain

Clarence House Chase
2026
Jonbon	Thistle Ask	Only two finished

Previous years
2025
Jonbon	Energumene	Edwardstone
2024
Elixir De Nutz	Jonbon	Fugitif
2023
Editeur Du Gite	Edwardstone	Energumene
2022
Shishkin	Energumene	First Flow
2021
First Flow	Politologue	Waiting Patiently

2020-2011
2020
Defi Du Seuil	Un De Sceaux	Marracudja
2019
Altior	Fox Norton	Diego Du Charmil
2018
Un De Sceaux	Speredek	Kylemore Lough
2017
Un De Sceaux	Uxizandre	Top Gamble
2016
Un De Sceaux	Sire De Grugy	Traffic Fluide
2015
Dodging Bullets	Sprinter Sacre	Twinlight
2014
Sire De Grugy	Hidden Cyclone	Kauto Stone
2013
Sprinter Sacre	Mad Moose	Somersby
2012
Somersby	Finian's Rainbow	Al Ferof
2011
Master Minded	Somersby	Mad Max

2010-2001
2010
Twist Magic	Petit Robin	Oh Crick
2009
Master Minded	Petit Robin	Mahogany Blaze
2008
Tamarinbleu	Twist Magic	Mansony
2006
Tysou	Dempsey	Kalca Mome
2005
Well Chief	Thisthatandtother	Kadarann
2004
Isio	Azertyuiop	Got One Too
2002
Turgeonev	Wave Rock	Davoski
2001
Function Dream	Cenkos	Exit Swinger

2000-1991
2000
Nordance Prince	Flagship Uberalles	Celibate
1999
Call Equiname	Get Real	Celibate
1998
Jeffell	Celibate	Or Royal
1997
Ask Tom	Clay County	Big Matt
1996
Big Matt	Martin's Lamp	Dancing Paddy
1995
Martha's Son	Egypt Mill Prince	Coulton
1994
Viking Flagship	Egypt Mill Prince	Billy Bathgate
1993
Sybillin	Deep Sensation	Fragrant Dawn
1992
Waterloo Boy	Young Snugfit	Sure Metal
1991
Blitzkreig	Young Snugfit	Katabatic

1990-1989
1990
Meikleour	Feroda	Panto Prince
1989
Desert Orchid	Panto Prince	Ida's Delight

The Clarence House Chase is a Grade 1 National Hunt steeplechase in Great Britain which is open to horses aged five years or older. It is run at Ascot over a distance of about 2 miles and 1 furlong (2 miles and 167 yards, or 3,371 metres), and during its running there are thirteen fences to be jumped. The race is scheduled to take place each year in January.

The event was sponsored from its inauguration to 2013 by the bookmaker Victor Chandler. It was registered as the Clarence House Chase, but it was usually referred to by its sponsored title. In 2014 the race reverted to its registered title and the sponsorship was taken over by Sodexo. In 2018 it was sponsored by Royal Salute Whisy and since 2019 Matchbook betting exchange have sponsored the race.

The first running was planned to have taken place in 1987. However, it was abandoned that year due to frost, and also the following year because of fog. Originally it was a handicap race, and its distance was set at 2 miles (3,219 metres). In 2005 and 2006, while its usual home was closed for redevelopment, the event was temporarily switched to alternative venues. Upon returning to Ascot the race's regular distance was extended by a furlong. In 2007 it was promoted to Grade 1 status, and it ceased to be run as a handicap.

The race often includes some of the leading contenders for the Queen Mother Champion Chase. Seven horses have won both races in the same season – Viking Flagship (1994), Call Equiname (1999), Master Minded (2009), Sprinter Sacre (2013), Sire De Grugy (2014), Dodging Bullets (2015) and Altior (2019).

== Records ==
Most successful horse (3 wins):

- Un de Sceaux – 2016, 2017, 2018

Leading jockey (4 wins):

- Ruby Walsh – Master Minded (2009), Twist Magic (2010) Un de Sceaux (2016, 2017)

Leading trainer (8 wins):

- Nicky Henderson - Big Matt (1996), Isio (2004), Tysou (2006), Sprinter Sacre (2013), Altior (2019), Shishkin (2022), Jonbon (2025,2026)

== Winners ==
As a handicap race

- Weights given in stones and pounds.

Year	Winner	Age	Weight	Jockey	Trainer
1987	Abandoned due to frost				
1988	Abandoned due to fog				
1989	Desert Orchid	10	12-00	Simon Sherwood	David Elsworth
1990	Meikleour	11	10-00	Derek Byrne	Jimmy FitzGerald
1991	Blitzkreig	8	10-04	Tommy Carmody	Edward O'Grady
1992	Waterloo Boy	9	11-10	Richard Dunwoody	David Nicholson
1993	Sybillin	7	10-10	Mark Dwyer	Jimmy FitzGerald
1994 (Note: The 1994 race took place at Warwick)	Viking Flagship	7	10-10	Richard Dunwoody	David Nicholson
1995	Martha's Son	8	10-09	Rodney Farrant	Tim Forster
1996	Big Matt	8	10-04	Mick Fitzgerald	Nicky Henderson
1997 (Note: The 1997 and 1999 editions were held at Kempton Park)	Ask Tom	8	10-10	Russ Garritty	Tom Tate
1998	Jeffell	8	10–11	Conor O'Dwyer	Arthur Moore
1999	Call Equiname	9	11-03	Robert Thornton	Paul Nicholls
2000	Nordance Prince	9	10-00	Tony McCoy	Venetia Williams
2001	Function Dream	9	10–11	Anthony Ross	Mary Reveley
2002	Turgeonev	7	10-04	Richard McGrath	Tim Easterby
2003	Abandoned due to frost and snow (Note: In 2003 a replacement race was run at Kempton – Tote Exacta Chase, won by Young Devereaux)				
2004	Isio	8	10-05	Mick Fitzgerald	Nicky Henderson
2005 (Note: The race was switched to Cheltenham in 2005)	Well Chief	6	11-10	Timmy Murphy	Martin Pipe
2006 (Note: The 2006 running took place at Sandown Park)	Tysou	9	11-02	Mick Fitzgerald	Nicky Henderson

As a conditions race

Year	Winner	Age	Jockey	Trainer
2007	Abandoned due to waterlogging			
2008	Tamarinbleu	8	Tom Scudamore	David Pipe
2009	Master Minded	6	Ruby Walsh	Paul Nicholls
2010	Twist Magic	8	Ruby Walsh	Paul Nicholls
2011	Master Minded	8	Tony McCoy	Paul Nicholls
2012	Somersby	8	Dominic Elsworth	Henrietta Knight
2013 (Note: The 2013 race took place at Cheltenham after the original fixture at Ascot was abandoned due to snow)	Sprinter Sacre	7	Barry Geraghty	Nicky Henderson
2014	Sire De Grugy	8	Jamie Moore	Gary Moore
2015	Dodging Bullets	7	Noel Fehily	Paul Nicholls
2016	Un de Sceaux	8	Ruby Walsh	Willie Mullins
2017 (Note: The 2017, 2023 and 2024 races took place at Cheltenham after the original fixtures at Ascot were abandoned due to frost)	Un de Sceaux	9	Ruby Walsh	Willie Mullins
2018	Un de Sceaux	10	Paul Townend	Willie Mullins
2019	Altior	9	Nico de Boinville	Nicky Henderson
2020	Defi Du Seuil	7	Barry Geraghty	Philip Hobbs
2021	First Flow	9	David Bass	Kim Bailey
2022	Shishkin	8	Nico de Boinville	Nicky Henderson
2023	Editeur Du Gite	9	Niall Houlihan	Gary Moore
2024	Elixir De Nutz	10	Freddie Gingell	Joe Tizzard
2025	Jonbon	9	Nico de Boinville	Nicky Henderson
2026	Jonbon	10	James Bowen	Nicky Henderson

== See also ==
- Horse racing in Great Britain
- List of British National Hunt races
