= Webster Cup Chase =

Steeplechase horse race in Ireland

Webster Cup Chase
2026
James Du Berlais	Better Days Ahead	Saint Sam

Previous years
2025
Senecia	El Fabiolo	Fil Dor
2024
Ash Tree Meadow	Lucid Dreams	Journey With Me
2023
Any Second Now	Velvet Elvis	Hurricane Darwin
2022
Sizing Pottsie	Master McShee	Notebook
2021
Any Second Now	Castlegrace Paddy	Ornua

2020-2011
2020
Castlegrace Paddy	Ornua	Cadmium
2019
Darasso	Cadmium	Ball D'Arc
2018
Great Field	Doctor Phoenix	Alisier D'Irlande
2017
A Toi Phil	Nearly Nama'd	The Tullow Tank
2016
Smashing	Road To Riches	Foxrock
2015
Felix Yonger	Argocat	Rathlin
2014
Bog Warrior	Baily Green	Down In Neworleans
2013
Sumkindasuprstar	Mr Cracker	Call The Police
2012
Tranquil Sea	Zaarito	Saddler's Native
2011
Hughies Grey	See U Bob	Whatuthink

2010-2000
2010
Glencove Marina	Made In Taipan	Rare Bob
2009
Royal County Star	Glenfinn Captain	Watson Lake
2008
Sher Beau	No Full	Justpourit
2007
Nickname	Central House	Jim
2006
Watson Lake	Nickname	Hi Cloy
2005
Native Upmanship	Rathgar Beau	Baily Mist
2004
Rathgar Beau	Strong Run	Winning Dream
2003
Rince Ri	Knife Edge	Moscow Express
2002
Moscow Express	Political Animal	Shes Sharp
2000
Danoli	Jeffell	Mr Baxter Basics

The Webster Cup Chase is a Grade 2 National Hunt chase in Ireland which is open to horses aged five years or older. It is run at Navan over a distance of 2 miles (3,219 metres), and it is scheduled to take place each year in late March or early April.

The race was first run in 2000, as the Navan Commercials Truck Importers Chase. From 2003 until 2010 it was known as the An Uaimh Chase (An Uaimh is Irish for Navan) and was awarded Grade 3 status in 2004.

The race was awarded Grade 2 status in 2011 and renamed as the Webster Cup Chase.

It was run over 2 miles and 4 furlongs until 2017 but was reduced to its current distance in 2018 when Fairyhouse and Navan agreed to swap the distances of their two Graded Chases scheduled for the spring, leading to the creation of the Devenish Chase.

== Records ==
Most successful horse (2 wins):

- Any Second Now – 2021, 2023

Leading jockey (6 wins):

- Ruby Walsh – Moscow Express (2002), Rince Ri (2003), Nickname (2007), Glencove Marina (2010), Felix Yonger (2015), A Toi Phil (2017)

Leading trainer (4 wins):

- Willie Mullins - Glencove Marina (2010), Felix Yonger (2015), Great Field (2018), James Du Berlais (2026)

== Winners ==
Year	Winner	Age	Jockey	Trainer
2000	Danoli	12	Shay Barry	Thomas Foley
2001	Cancelled due to foot-and-mouth crisis
2002	Moscow Express	10	Ruby Walsh	Frances Crowley
2003	Rince Ri	10	Ruby Walsh	Ted Walsh
2004	Rathgar Beau	8	Shay Barry	Dusty Sheehy
2005	Native Upmanship	12	Conor O'Dwyer	Arthur Moore
2006	Watson Lake	8	Paul Carberry	Noel Meade
2007	Nickname	8	Ruby Walsh	Martin Brassil
2008	Sher Beau	9	Andrew McNamara	Philip Fenton
2009	Royal County Star	10	David Casey	Tony Martin
2010	Glencove Marina	8	Ruby Walsh	Willie Mullins
2011	Hughies Grey	7	Mick Darcy	Mervyn Torrens
2012	Tranquil Sea	10	Barry Geraghty	Edward O'Grady
2013	Sumkindasuprstar	9	Ben Dalton	John O Clifford
2014	Bog Warrior	10	Paul Carberry	Tony Martin
2015	Felix Yonger	9	Ruby Walsh	Willie Mullins
2016	Smashing	7	Johnny Burke	Henry de Bromhead
2017	A Toi Phil	7	Ruby Walsh	Gordon Elliott
2018	Great Field	7	Jody McGarvey	Willie Mullins
2019	Darasso	6	Barry Geraghty	Joseph O'Brien
2020	Castlegrace Paddy	9	Bryan Cooper	Pat Fahy
2021	Any Second Now	9	Mark Walsh	Ted Walsh
2022	Sizing Pottsie	8	Robbie Power	Jessica Harrington
2023	Any Second Now	11	Denis O'Regan	Ted Walsh
2024	Ash Tree Meadow	8	Sam Ewing	Gordon Elliott
2025	Senecia	8	Phillip Enright	Vincent Halley
2026	James Du Berlais	10	JJ Slevin	Willie Mullins

== See also ==
- List of Irish National Hunt races
