= Dodging Bullets =

British-bred Thoroughbred racehorse

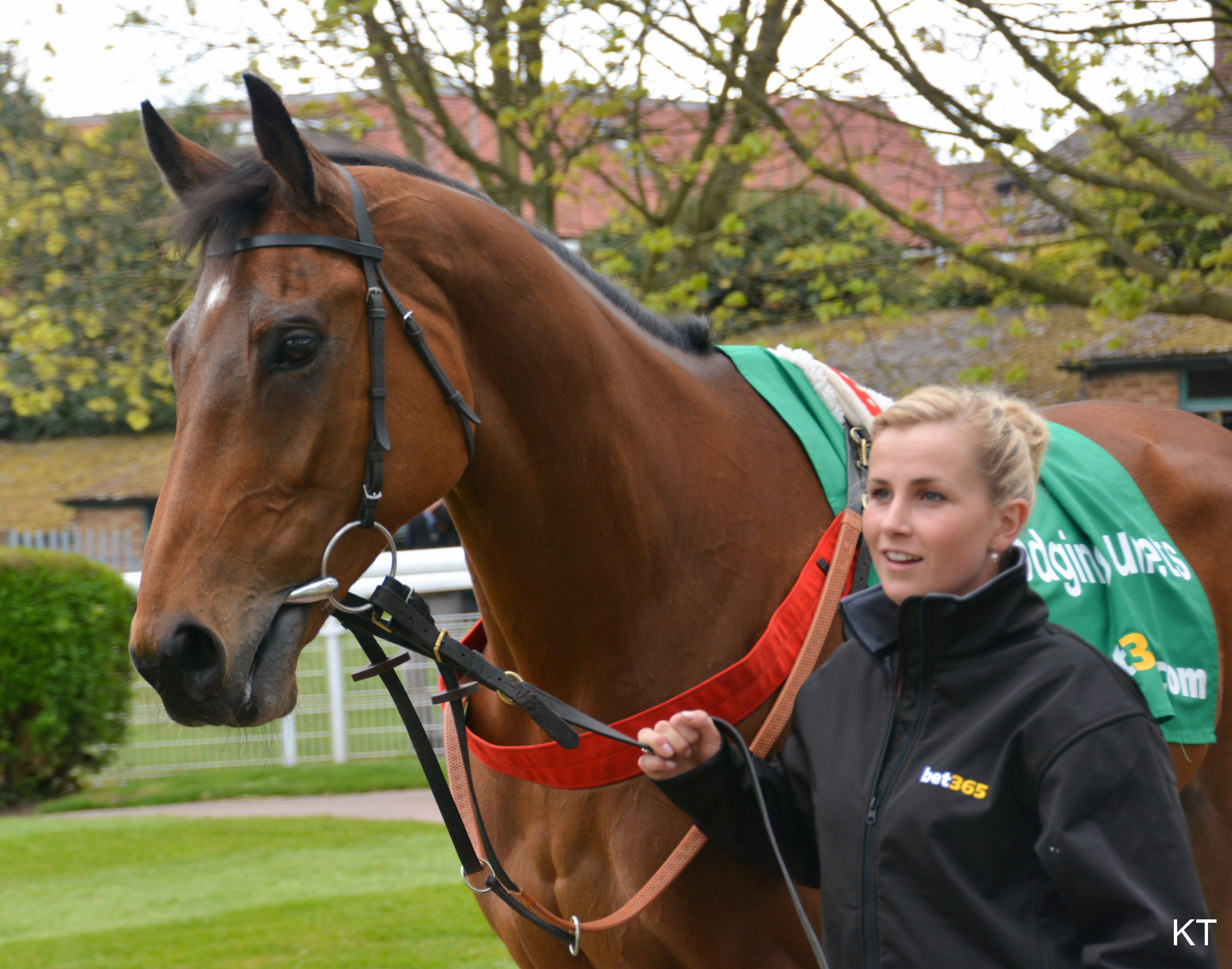
- Dodging Bullets, April 2015
- Sire: Dubawi
- Grandsire: Dubai Millennium
- Dam: Nova Cyngi
- Damsire: Kris S.
- Sex: Gelding
- Foaled: 16 April 2008
- Country: United Kingdom
- Colour: Bay
- Breeder: Frankie Dettori
- Owner: R A Pegum; Martin Broughton & Friends
- Trainer: Andrew Oliver; Paul Nicholls
- Record: 27: 10-4-4
- Earnings: £502,357

Major wins
- Sharp Novices' Hurdle (2012); November Novices' Chase (2013); Wayward Lad Novices' Chase (2013); Tingle Creek Chase (2014); Clarence House Chase (2015); Queen Mother Champion Chase (2015)

Dodging Bullets (foaled 16 April 2008) is a British retired Thoroughbred racehorse, best known for his performances in National Hunt races. Bred by the leading jockey Frankie Dettori, he had a flat racing career of limited importance, winning two minor races from nine starts as a three-year-old in 2011. He showed better form when switched to hurdles, winning the Sharp Novices' Hurdle in 2012. He proved even better when he began to compete in steeplechases, winning the November Novices' Chase and the Wayward Lad Novices' Chase in 2013. In the 2014/2015 National Hunt season he emerged as one of the best chasers in Britain, recording three consecutive Grade 1 wins in the Tingle Creek Chase, Clarence House Chase and Queen Mother Champion Chase.

== Background ==
Dodging Bullets is a bay gelding with a white star and two white socks bred in the United Kingdom by Frankie Dettori. He was sired by Dubawi, a top-class son of Dubai Millennium, whose wins included the Irish 2,000 Guineas and the Prix Jacques Le Marois. At stud, Dubawi has been a highly-successful breeding stallion, siring major flat winners such as Monterosso, Al Kazeem, Makfi, Lucky Nine and Poet's Voice. Dodging Bullets' dam Nova Cyngi, was an unraced daughter of the Prix Vermeille winner Northern Trick, whose other descendants include Main Sequence and Light Shift.

In November 2009, the yearling Dodging Bullets was sent to the Tattersalls sales and was bought for 8,000 guineas by the Irish trainer Andrew Oliver. The horse entered the ownership of R A Pegum and was trained by Oliver at Caledon, County Tyrone.

== Racing career ==
=== 2011: three-year-old season ===
Dodging Bullets began his racing career in a maiden race over one mile at Cork Racecourse on 13 May when he finished seventh of the seventeen runners at odds of 50/1. He failed to win in his next six races, consisting of maiden races and minor handicaps in Ireland before winning a handicap race over eight and a half furlongs at Galway Races on 27 July. On his final appearance on the flat, he won a ten furlong handicap at Sligo Racecourse in August.

At the end of the year, Dodging Bullets was sold and sent to England to be trained for a National Hunt career by Paul Nicholls.

=== 2011/2012 National Hunt season: novice hurdles ===
On his first appearance over hurdles he was immediately entered against good-class opposition when he contested the Grade 2 Dovecote Novices' Hurdle at Kempton Park Racecourse on 25 February. Ridden by Ruby Walsh he started at odds of 9/2 and finished second of the six runners, one and a half lengths behind the odds-on favourite Grumeti. In the following month, Dodging Bullets was sent to the Cheltenham Festival for the first time and started a 20/1 outsider for the Triumph Hurdle in which he was ridden by Daryl Jacob. He finished fourth of the twenty runners behind Countrywide Flame, Hisaabaat and Grumeti. On his third and final appearance of the season, he finished sixth behind Grumeti in the Anniversary 4-Y-O Novices' Hurdle after being badly hampered at the fifth hurdle.

=== 2012/2013 National Hunt season: novice hurdles ===
As he had failed to win in his three races in the spring of 2012, Dodging Bullets remained eligible to compete in novice hurdle races in the 2012/2013 National Hunt season. On his seasonal debut on 20 October, he recorded his first jump race win in a novice hurdle at Cheltenham, taking the lead approaching the last and going clear of his rivals to win by eight lengths at odds of 10/11. On 16 November the gelding was moved up in class for the Grade 2 Sharp Novices' Hurdle at the same course and started 5/4 favourite against seven opponents. Ridden by Ruby Walsh, he led from the start and survived a mistake at the last flight of hurdles to win by one and a half lengths from River Maigue. The gelding was stepped up again in class and matched against more experienced hurdlers when he contested the Grade 1 Christmas Hurdle at Kempton on 26 December. He stayed on in the closing stages to finish third behind Darlan and Raya Star, and ahead of Countrywide Flame, Cinders and Ashes (winner of the Supreme Novices' Hurdle) and Punjabi.

Dodging Bullets went to the Cheltenham for the festival again in March 2013 and started at odds of 12/1 for the Supreme Novices' Hurdle. After moving up to challenge the leaders three hurdles from the finish he weakened badly in the closing stages and finished ninth, fifty lengths behind the winner Champagne Fever. He was moved up in distance for the Mersey Novices' Hurdle over two and a half miles at Aintree Racecourse in April, but again ran poorly and came home last of the seven finishers behind Ubak.

=== 2013/2014 National Hunt season: novice chases ===
In the 2013/2014 National Hunt season, Dodging Bullets competed in novice steeplechases. On his debut over the larger obstacles, he started 8/11 favourite for a minor event at Kempton on 20 October and won by four lengths after taking the lead at the tenth of the twelve fences. In the following month he was matched against Raya Star and the County Hurdle winner Ted Veale in the November Novices' Chase at Cheltenham. Ridden by Jacob, he took the lead after the penultimate fence and won by five lengths from Raya Star with Ted Veale another three and a quarter lengths back in third. On 27 December he started 7/4 second favourite behind the odds-on Grandouet (whose wins included the Champion Four Year Old Hurdle and the International Hurdle) in the Grade 2 Wayward Lad Novices' Chase over two miles at Kempton. Dodging Bullets tracked Grandouet before taking the lead four fences from the finish and drew away to win by ten lengths.

Dodging Bullets took on more experienced chasers in the Grade 2 Game Spirit Chase at Newbury Racecourse in February and finished second, beaten a neck by the seven-year-old favourite Module. On his third appearance at the Cheltenham Festival, Dodging Bullets started the 6/1 fourth choice in the betting (behind Champagne Fever, Trifolium and Rock On Ruby) for the Grade 1 Arkle Challenge Trophy and finished fourth, beaten five lengths by the 33/1 outsider Western Warhorse. On his final appearance of the season, the gelding again ran poorly at Aintree, finishing last of five behind Uxizandre in the Manifesto Novices' Chase.

=== 2014/2015 National Hunt season: steeplechases ===
On his first appearance of the 2014/2015 season Dodging Bullets finished third behind Uxizandre and Simply Ned in the Shloer Chase at Cheltenham on 16 November. On 6 December, the gelding was moved up in class for the Grade 1 Tingle Creek Chase at Sandown Park Racecourse. He started at odds of 9/1 in a ten-runner field which also included Balder Succes (Maghull Novices' Chase), God's Own (Ryanair Novice Chase, Haldon Gold Cup), Oscar Whisky and Somersby (Clarence House Chase). Ridden by Sam Twiston-Davies he tracked the leaders before moving up to take second place at the ninth fence. He took the lead approaching the last fence and won by two and a half lengths from Somersby.

Dodging Bullets' next race was the Grade 1 Clarence House Chase at Ascot Racecourse on 17 January in which he started 7/2 second favourite behind the nine-year-old Sprinter Sacre, who was returning after a long break caused by health problems. Ridden by Noel Fehily, he settled in third place as Somersby led before Sprinter Sacre moved up to lead at the second last. Dodging Bullets overtook Sprinter Sacre approaching the last and won by three lengths with the Irish challenger Twinlight (winner of the Paddy Power Dial-A-Bet Chase) a further five lengths back in third.

On 11 March 2015, Dodging Bullets contested the 56th running of the Queen Mother Champion Chase. He started the 9/2 third choice in the betting behind Sprinter Sacre (winner of the race in 2013) and the 2014 winner Sire de Grugy. The other contenders included Somersby, Simply Ned, the thirteen-year-old Irish veteran Sizing Europe, the Game Spirit Chase winner Mr Mole and the Desert Orchid Chase winner Special Tiara. Sam Twiston-Davies positioned the gelding in second as Special Tiara led from the start and opened up a clear advantage. Dodging Bullets moved up to challenge at the third last and took the lead at the final fence. On the run-in he got the better of Special Tiara and held off the challenge of Somersby to win by one and a quarter lengths. Special Tiara was a length and three quarters back in third, seven lengths clear of Sire de Grugy.

== Pedigree ==
Pedigree of Dodging Bullets (GB), bay gelding, 2008
Sire Dubawi (IRE) 2002	Dubai Millennium (GB); 1996	Seeking the Gold	Mr. Prospector
Sire Dubawi (IRE) 2002	Dubai Millennium (GB); 1996	Seeking the Gold	Con Game
Sire Dubawi (IRE) 2002	Dubai Millennium (GB); 1996	Colorado Dancer	Shareef Dancer
Sire Dubawi (IRE) 2002	Dubai Millennium (GB); 1996	Colorado Dancer	Fall Aspen
Sire Dubawi (IRE) 2002	Zomaradah (GB); 1995	Deploy	Shirley Heights
Sire Dubawi (IRE) 2002	Zomaradah (GB); 1995	Deploy	Slightly Dangerous
Sire Dubawi (IRE) 2002	Zomaradah (GB); 1995	Jawaher	Dancing Brave
Sire Dubawi (IRE) 2002	Zomaradah (GB); 1995	Jawaher	High Tern
Dam Nova Cyngi (USA) 1999	Kris S. (USA); 1977	Roberto	Hail To Reason
Dam Nova Cyngi (USA) 1999	Kris S. (USA); 1977	Roberto	Bramalea
Dam Nova Cyngi (USA) 1999	Kris S. (USA); 1977	Sharp Queen	Princequillo
Dam Nova Cyngi (USA) 1999	Kris S. (USA); 1977	Sharp Queen	Bridgework
Dam Nova Cyngi (USA) 1999	Northern Trick (USA); 1981	Northern Dancer	Nearctic
Dam Nova Cyngi (USA) 1999	Northern Trick (USA); 1981	Northern Dancer	Natalma
Dam Nova Cyngi (USA) 1999	Northern Trick (USA); 1981	Trick Chick	Prince John
Dam Nova Cyngi (USA) 1999	Northern Trick (USA); 1981	Trick Chick	Fast Line (Family: 4-m)
