= Desert Orchid Handicap Chase =

Steeplechase horse race in Britain

Desert Orchid Chase
2025
Thistle Ask	Saint Segal	Boothill

Previous years
2024
Soul Icon	Edwardstone	Martator
2023
Editeur Du Gite	Nube Negra	Elixir De Nutz
2022
Editeur Du Gite	Nube Negra	Dolos
2021
Shishkin	Greaneteen	Sky Pirate

2020-2011
2020
Nube Negra	Altior	Duc Des Genievres
2019
Bun Doran	Duc Des Genievres	Sceau Royal
2018
Altior	Diego Du Charmil	Special Tiara
2017
Politologue	Vaniteux	Forest Bihan
2016
Special Tiara	Sir Valentino	Savello
2015
Sprinter Sacre	Sire De Grugy	Vibrato Valtat
2014
Special Tiara	Balder Succes	Third Intention
2013
Sire De Grugy	Oiseau de Nuit	Astracad
2012
Sanctuaire	Kumbeshwar	His Excellency
2011
Finian's Rainbow	Wishfull Thinking	Oiseau de Nuit

2010-2006
2009
Petit Robin	Well Chief	I'msingingtheblues
2008
Fiepes Shuffle	Petit Robin	Pablo Du Charmil
2007
Voy Por Ustedes	Hoo La Baloo	Mister Quasimodo
2006
Voy Por Ustedes	Oneway	Foreman

The Desert Orchid Handicap Chase is a Grade 2 National Hunt steeplechase in Great Britain which is open to horses aged four years or older. It is run at Kempton Park over a distance of about 2 miles (3,219 metres), and during its running there are twelve fences to be jumped. The race is scheduled to take place each year in late December during the course's Christmas Festival.

The race was first run on 27 December 2006. It is named in memory of Desert Orchid, a popular racehorse who died several weeks earlier. Desert Orchid won Kempton's most prestigious event, the King George VI Chase, four times between 1986 and 1990. His ashes were scattered at the racecourse on the day of this race's inaugural running. The event replaced the Castleford Chase in the National Hunt calendar as a Grade 2 chase over 2 miles. From 2006 to 2022 it was run as a conditions race.

In April 2023 the British Horseracing Authority announced that the race would become a Grade 2 Limited Handicap from the 2023/24 season.

== Records ==
Most successful horse (2 wins):

- Voy Por Ustedes – 2006, 2007
- Special Tiara - 2014, 2016
- Editeur Du Gite - 2022, 2023

Leading jockey (3 wins):

- Barry Geraghty – Petit Robin (2009), Finian's Rainbow (2011), Special Tiara (2014)
- Nico de Boinville - Sprinter Sacre (2015), Altior (2018), Shishkin (2021)

Leading trainer (5 wins):

- Nicky Henderson - Petit Robin (2009), Finian's Rainbow (2011), Sprinter Sacre (2015), Altior (2018), Shishkin (2021)

== Winners ==
Year	Winner	Age	Jockey	Trainer
2006	Voy Por Ustedes	5	Robert Thornton	Alan King
2007	Voy Por Ustedes	6	Robert Thornton	Alan King
2008	Fiepes Shuffle	8	Jamie Moore	Christian von der Recke
2009	Petit Robin	6	Barry Geraghty	Nicky Henderson
2010	Abandoned due to frost
2011	Finian's Rainbow	8	Barry Geraghty	Nicky Henderson
2012	Sanctuaire	6	Ruby Walsh	Paul Nicholls
2013	Sire De Grugy	7	Jamie Moore	Gary Moore
2014	Special Tiara	7	Barry Geraghty	Henry De Bromhead
2015	Sprinter Sacre	9	Nico de Boinville	Nicky Henderson
2016	Special Tiara	9	Noel Fehily	Henry De Bromhead
2017	Politologue	6	Sam Twiston-Davies	Paul Nicholls
2018	Altior	8	Nico de Boinville	Nicky Henderson
2019	Bun Doran	8	Jonathan Burke	Tom George
2020	Nube Negra	6	Harry Skelton	Dan Skelton
2021	Shishkin	7	Nico de Boinville	Nicky Henderson
2022	Editeur Du Gite	8	Niall Houlihan	Gary Moore
2023	Editeur Du Gite	9	Niall Houlihan	Gary Moore
2024	Soul Icon	7	Harry Cobden	Keiran Burke
2025	Thistle Ask	8	Harry Skelton	Dan Skelton

== See also ==
- Horse racing in Great Britain
- List of British National Hunt races

== Sources ==
- Racing Post:
  - 2006, 2007, 2008, 2009, 2011, 2012, 2013, 2014, 2015, 2016
  - 2017, 2018, 2019, 2020, 2025

- pedigreequery.com – Desert Orchid Chase – Kempton.
