= 2015 Cheltenham Gold Cup =

87th running of the Cheltenham Gold Cup horse race

- Cheltenham Gold Cup
- Location: Cheltenham Racecourse
- Date: 13 March 2015
- Winning horse: Coneygree
- Starting price: 7/1
- Jockey: Nico de Boinville
- Trainer: Mark Bradstock
- Owner: The Max Partnership
- Conditions: Soft, Good to Soft in places

The 2015 Cheltenham Gold Cup (known as the Betfred Gold Cup for sponsorship reasons) was the 87th annual running of the Cheltenham Gold Cup horse race and was held at Cheltenham Racecourse on Friday 13 March 2015.

The race was won by Coneygree with a winning margin of a length and a half at the line. Coneygree became the first novice to win the Cheltenham Gold Cup since 1974.

== Build-up ==
A week before the race Silviniaco Conti was listed as the favourite at odds of 3/1.

The race was shown live on Channel 4 in the UK and Ireland.

== Details ==
- Sponsor: Betfred
- Winner's prize money: £313,225.00
- Going:Soft, Good to Soft in places
- Number of runners: 16
- Winner's time: 6m 42.70s

== Full result ==
	*	Horse	Age	Jockey	Trainer ^{†}	SP
1		Coneygree	8	Nico de Boinville	Mark Bradstock	7/1
2	1 1/2	Djakadam	6	Ruby Walsh	Willie Mullins (Ire)	10/1
3	2	Road To Riches	8	Bryan Cooper	Noel Meade (Ire)	8/1
4	6	Holywell	8	Richie McLernon	Jonjo O'Neill	8/1
5	14	On His Own	11	Mr Patrick Mullins	Willie Mullins (Ire)	33/1
6	1	Many Clouds	8	Leighton Aspell	Oliver Sherwood	7/1
7	2 1/2	Silviniaco Conti	9	Noel Fehily	Paul Nicholls	3/1 Fav
8	hd	Smad Place	8	Wayne Hutchinson	Alan King	25/1
9	3/4	Carlingford Lough	9	Tony McCoy	John Kiely	14/1
10	14	Boston Bob	10	Paul Townend	Willie Mullins (Ire)	33/1
11	nse	Houblon Des Obeaux	8	Aidan Coleman	Venetia Williams	33/1
PU		Bobs Worth	10	Barry Geraghty	Nicky Henderson	16/1
PU		Home Farm	8	David Casey	Henry de Bromhead (Ire)	100/1
PU		Lord Windermere	9	Davy Russell	Jim Culloty (Ire)	20/1
PU		Sam Winner	8	Sam Twiston-Davies	Paul Nicholls	20/1
PU		The Giant Bolster	10	Tom Scudamore	David Bridgwater	33/1

* The distances between the horses are shown in lengths or shorter. shd = short-head.
† Trainers are based in Great Britain unless indicated. PU = pulled-up. NR = non runner

== See also ==
- Horse racing in Great Britain
- List of British National Hunt races
- 2015 Grand National
