= Wayward Lad Novices' Chase =

Steeplechase horse race in Britain

Wayward Lad Novices' Chase
2025
Mambonumberfive	Hansard	Mirabad

Previous years
2024
Sir Gino	Ballyburn	Brookie
2023
Master Chewy	Nickle Back	Soul Icon
2022
Boothill	Aucunrisque	Glory And Fortune
2021
Edwardstone	Do Your Job	Solo

2020-2011
2020
Shishkin	Tamaroc Du Mathan	Elusive Belle
2019
Global Citizen	Rouge Vif	Grand Sancy
2018
Dynamite Dollars	Kalashnikov	Highway One O One
2017
Cyrname	Shantou Rock	Tommy Silver
2016
Altior	Marracudja	Stephanie Frances
2015
Ar Mad	Vaniteux	Arzal
2014
Vibrato Valtat	Three Kingdoms	God's Own
2013
Dodging Bullets	Grandouet	Bin End
2012
Simonsig	Hinterland	Wings of Smoke
2011
Sprinter Sacre	Peddlers Cross	Harry Hunt

2010-2001
2009
Riverside Theatre	El Dancer	Rory Boy
2008
Original	French Opera	Oumeyade
2007
Mahogany Blaze	Pur De Sivola	My Petra
2006
Jack The Giant	Twist Magic	Royal Shakespeare
2005
Hoo La Baloo	Crossbow Creek	Flying Spirit
2003
Caracciola	Thisthatandtother	Mylo
2002
Epervier D'Or	Got One Too	Alka International
2001
Fondmort	Monkerhostin	Moonshine Bay

2000-1991
2000
Dusk Duel	Corniche	Sandy Duff
1998
Hoh Express	Fanfaron	Only two ran
1997
Angelo's Double	Bay Lough	Dontleavethenest
1996
Greenback	Mister Drum	Potter's Bay
1994
High Baron	Brief Gale	Kadi
1993
Bas De Laine	Monsieur Le Cure	Poppets Pet
1992
Dusty Miller	Ashfold Copse	Snitton Lane
1991
Poetic Gem	Purbeck Dove	Norman Conqueror

1990-1988
1990
Remittance Man	Calapaez	Amrullah
1989
Celtic Shot	Abbreviation	Only two finished
1988
Star's Delight	Hogmanay	Chase The Line

The Wayward Lad Novices' Chase is a Grade 2 National Hunt steeplechase in Great Britain which is open to horses aged four years or older. It is run at Kempton Park over a distance of about 2 miles (3,219 metres), and during its running there are twelve fences to be jumped. The race is for novice chasers, and it is scheduled to take place each year in late December during the course's Christmas Festival.

The event is named in honour of Wayward Lad, a winner of Kempton's most prestigious race, the King George VI Chase, three times during the 1980s. The earliest version of the race was contested over 2 1/2 miles, and this was extended by 110 yards in 1992. The race was absent from the National Hunt calendar in 1999, but it returned the following year with a new distance of 2 miles. It was subsequently promoted to Grade 2 status, and it was first run at this level in 2005. From 2009 to 2015 it was sponsored by William Hill and titled the Williamhill.com Novices' Chase. From 2016 to 2018 the race was sponsored by 32Red and since 2019 Ladbrokes have been the sponsors.

== Winners ==
Year	Winner	Age	Jockey	Trainer
1975	Double Negative	5	Ken White	Fred Rimell
1976	Don't Hesitate	6	Martin O'Halloran	Peter Cundell
1977	Forty Lines	8	Dr D Chesney	D Chesney
1978	Ten Dollars More	6	John Francome	Fred Winter
1979	Bideford	6	Philip Blacker	Stan Mellor
1980	Special Cargo	7	Bill Smith	Fulke Walwyn
1981	Abandoned due to frost
1982	Everett	7	Stuart Shilston	Fulke Walwyn
1983	Carved Opal	5	John Francome	Fred Winter
1984	Gainsay	5	Peter Scudamore	David Nicholson
1985	Bolands Cross	6	Peter Scudamore	Nick Gaselee
1986	Tawridge	6	Steve Knight	Andrew Turnell
1987	The West Awake	6	Simon Sherwood	Oliver Sherwood
1988	Star's Delight	6	Hywel Davies	Ron Hodges
1989	Celtic Shot	7	Peter Scudamore	Charlie Brooks
1990	Remittance Man	6	Richard Dunwoody	Nicky Henderson
1991	Poetic Gem	6	Mark Perrett	Sue Smith
1992	Dusty Miller	6	Mark Richards	Simon Sherwood
1993	Bas de Laine	7	Mark Richards	Oliver Sherwood
1994	High Baron	7	Richard Dunwoody	Robert Alner
1995	Abandoned due to frost
1996	Greenback	5	Norman Williamson	Philip Hobbs
1997	Angelo's Double	9	Brendan Powell	Bob Buckler
1998	Hoh Express	6	Andrew Thornton	Paul Webber
1999	Abandoned due to a security alert
2000	Dusk Duel	5	Mick Fitzgerald	Nicky Henderson
2001	Fondmort	5	Mick Fitzgerald	Nicky Henderson
2002	Epervier d'Or	4	Ruby Walsh	Paul Nicholls
2003	Caracciola	6	Mick Fitzgerald	Nicky Henderson
2004	Abandoned due to frost
2005 (Note: The race was switched to Sandown Park in 2005 as Kempton was closed for redevelopment)	Hoo La Baloo	4	Ruby Walsh	Paul Nicholls
2006	Jack the Giant	4	Tom Doyle	Nicky Henderson
2007	Mahogany Blaze	5	Paddy Brennan	Nigel Twiston-Davies
2008	Original	6	James Davies	Marcel Rolland
2009	Riverside Theatre	5	Barry Geraghty	Nicky Henderson
2010	Abandoned due to frost
2011	Sprinter Sacre	5	Barry Geraghty	Nicky Henderson
2012	Simonsig	6	Barry Geraghty	Nicky Henderson
2013	Dodging Bullets	5	Daryl Jacob	Paul Nicholls
2014	Vibrato Valtat	5	Noel Fehily	Paul Nicholls
2015	Ar Mad	5	Josh Moore	Gary Moore
2016	Altior	6	Noel Fehily	Nicky Henderson
2017	Cyrname	5	Sean Bowen	Paul Nicholls
2018	Dynamite Dollars	5	Harry Cobden	Paul Nicholls
2019	Global Citizen	7	David Bass	Ben Pauling
2020	Shishkin	6	Nico de Boinville	Nicky Henderson
2021	Edwardstone	7	Tom Cannon	Alan King
2022	Boothill	7	Jonathan Burke	Harry Fry
2023	Master Chewy	6	Tom Bellamy	Nigel Twiston-Davies
2024	Sir Gino	4	Nico de Boinville	Nicky Henderson
2025	Mambonumberfive	4	Ben Jones	Ben Pauling

== See also ==
- Horse racing in Great Britain
- List of British National Hunt races
