= Devenish Chase =

Steeplechase horse race in Ireland

Devenish Chase
2026
| Energumene | Blood Destiny | Found A Fifty |

Previous years
2025
Found A Fifty | Saint Sam | Blood Destiny
2024
Journey With Me | Appreciate It | Fil Dor
2023
Easy Game | Royal Rendezvous | Only two finished
2022
Easy Game | Cilaos Emery | Castlegrace Paddy
2021
Easy Game | Castlegrace Paddy | Snow Falcon

2020-2018
2019
| Jett | The Storyteller | Ordinary World |
2018
| Un De Sceaux | A Toi Phil | Ballycasey |

The Devenish Chase is a Grade 2 National Hunt steeplechase in Ireland which is open to horses aged five years or older. It is run at Fairyhouse over a distance of about 2 miles and 4 furlongs (4,023 metres), and during its running there are sixteen fences to be jumped. The race is scheduled to take place each year on Easter Monday.

The race was run for the first time in 2018. It was created when Fairyhouse and Navan agreed to swap the distances of their two Graded Chases scheduled for the spring. The Webster Cup Chase held at Navan is now run over 2 miles (previously 2 miles 4 furlongs) and the Normans Grove Chase, at Fairyhouse, (2 miles 1 furlong) was replaced by this race over 2 miles and 4 furlongs.

== Records ==
Most successful horse (3 wins):

- Easy Game - (2021, 2022, 2023)

Leading jockey (3 wins):

- Paul Townend - Un de Sceaux (2023), Easy Game (2023), Energumene (2026)

Leading trainer (5 wins):

- Willie Mullins - Un de Sceaux (2018), Easy Game (2021,2022,2023), Energumene (2026)

== Winners ==
| Year | Winner | Age | Jockey | Trainer |
| 2018 | Un de Sceaux | 10 | Paul Townend | Willie Mullins |
| 2019 | Jett | 8 | Robbie Power | Jessica Harrington |
| | no race 2020 (Note: The 2020 running was cancelled because of the COVID-19 pandemic in the Republic of Ireland) |
| 2021 | Easy Game | 7 | Brian Hayes | Willie Mullins |
| 2022 | Easy Game | 8 | Brian Hayes | Willie Mullins |
| 2023 | Easy Game | 9 | Paul Townend | Willie Mullins |
| 2024 | Journey With Me | 8 | Rachael Blackmore | Henry De Bromhead |
| 2025 | Found A Fifty | 8 | Sam Ewing | Gordon Elliott |
| 2026 | Energumene | 12 | Paul Townend | Willie Mullins |

== See also ==
- Horse racing in Ireland
- List of Irish National Hunt races
