= Badsworth Boy =

British-bred Thoroughbred racehorse

- Sire: Will Hays
- Grandsire: Bold Ruler
- Dam: Falcade
- Damsire: Falcon
- Sex: Gelding
- Foaled: 19 March 1975
- Country: Great Britain
- Colour: Chestnut
- Breeder: Michael Morrin
- Owner: Doug Armitage, Maurice Gibson and Ronald Howe
- Trainer: Michael W. Dickinson; Monica Dickinson (1985)
- Record: Not found
- Earnings: Not found

Major wins
- Queen Mother Champion Chase (1983, 1984, 1985)

Badsworth Boy (19 March 1975 – October 2002) was a British Thoroughbred racehorse. He completed a hat-trick from 1983 to 1985 in the Queen Mother Champion Chase. In so doing, he also became a winner for all three members of the Dickinson family as Tony, Michael and Monica all trained him in their turn, and he became the 12th horse in jumping history to pass the £100,000 earnings mark.

== Racing career ==
Badsworth Boy was sold as a yearling for 2,800 guineas and entered training with Snowy Wainwright. As a two-year-old in 1977, the colt ran eight times, winning minor events at Beverley Racecourse in June and July. He was then sold to Doug Armitage and was gelded in preparation for a jumping career.

In his first season over obstacles, he won a race at Sedgefield Racecourse and then finished third in the Triumph Hurdle. In all, Badsworth Boy claimed victory eight times over hurdles and eighteen times over fences, in spite of the fact that his very fast jumping sometimes led to disaster. In the first of his three Champion Chase triumphs, Badsworth Boy won by a distance from Artifice, with his stablemate and favourite Rathgorman - the 1982 winner - well behind. In 1984, he had ten lengths to spare over Little Bay, and in his final success, he finished the same distance in front of Far Bridge. As of 2020 he remains the only horse with three wins in the race. His final trip into the winner's enclosure came in January 1987.

Badsworth Boy was diagnosed with navicular disease as a juvenile and suffered from arthritis throughout his life. Michael Dickinson described him as the best horse he ever trained.

== Retirement and death ==
Badsworth Boy was retired to his owner's Little Lane Farm at Thorpe Hensley, near Rotherham. He died of a heart attack at the age of twenty-seven in October 2002.

== Pedigree ==
Pedigree of Badsworth Boy (GB), chestnut gelding, 1975
Sire Will Hays (USA) 1968	Bold Ruler (USA); 1954	Nasrullah	Nearco
Sire Will Hays (USA) 1968	Bold Ruler (USA); 1954	Nasrullah	Mumtaz Begum
Sire Will Hays (USA) 1968	Bold Ruler (USA); 1954	Miss Disco	Discovery
Sire Will Hays (USA) 1968	Bold Ruler (USA); 1954	Miss Disco	Outdone
Sire Will Hays (USA) 1968	Broadway (USA); 1959	Hasty Road	Roman
Sire Will Hays (USA) 1968	Broadway (USA); 1959	Hasty Road	Traffic Court
Sire Will Hays (USA) 1968	Broadway (USA); 1959	Flitabout	Challedon
Sire Will Hays (USA) 1968	Broadway (USA); 1959	Flitabout	Birdflower
Dam Falcade (GB) 1971	Falcon (GB); 1964	Milesian	My Babu
Dam Falcade (GB) 1971	Falcon (GB); 1964	Milesian	Oatflake
Dam Falcade (GB) 1971	Falcon (GB); 1964	Pretty Swift	Petition
Dam Falcade (GB) 1971	Falcon (GB); 1964	Pretty Swift	Fragilite
Dam Falcade (GB) 1971	Perpilia (GB); 1964	Red God	Nasrullah
Dam Falcade (GB) 1971	Perpilia (GB); 1964	Red God	Spring Run
Dam Falcade (GB) 1971	Perpilia (GB); 1964	Ace of Spades	Atout Maitre
Dam Falcade (GB) 1971	Perpilia (GB); 1964	Ace of Spades	Brave Empress (Family 14-c)

- Badsworth Boy was inbred 3 × 4 to Nasrullah, meaning that this stallion appears in both the third and fourth generations of his pedigree.
