= Cheltenham Chase =

Steeplechase horse race in Britain

Shloer Chase
2026
Jonbon	Mighty Bandit	Saint Segal

Previous years
2025
L'eau Du Sud	Jonbon	Matata
2024
Jonbon	Boothill	Edwardstone
2023
Jonbon	Edwardstone	Nube Negra
2022
Nube Negra	Ganapathi	Daly Tiger
2021
Nube Negra	Politologue	Put The Kettle On

2020-2011
2018
Sceau Royal	Simply Ned	Forest Bihan
2017
Fox Norton	Cloudy Dream	Special Tiara
2016
Fox Norton	Simply Ned	Special Tiara
2015
Sprinter Sacre	Somersby	Savello
2014
Uxizandre	Simply Ned	Dodging Bullets
2013
Kid Cassidy	Sire De Grugy	Special Tiara
2012
Wishfull Thinking	Doeslessthanme	Imperial Shabra
2011
Gauvain	Woolcombe Folly	West with the Wind

2010-2009
2010
Gauvain	Forpadydeplasterer	Tataniano
2009
Well Chief	Mahogany Blaze	Master Minded

The Cheltenham Chase, currently known for sponsorship purposes as the Shloer Chase, is a Grade 2 National Hunt chase in Great Britain which is open to horses aged five years or older. It is run on the Old Course at Cheltenham over a distance of about 2 miles (1 mile 7 furlongs and 199 yards, or 3,199 metres), and during its running there are twelve fences to be jumped. The race is scheduled to take place on the Friday of the November three-day meeting.

The race's registered title is the Cheltenham Chase but it has been run under a series of sponsored titles. Inaugurated in 2009 as the Connaught Chase, it was run as the Sinbad Testimonial 2010/2011 Chase before adopting its current name following sponsorship from drinks company Shloer. Initially a conditions chase, it was upgraded to a listed race in 2013 before attaining Grade 2 status in 2015.

== Records ==
Most successful horse (3 wins):

- Jonbon - 2023, 2024, 2026

Leading jockey (3 wins):

- Nico de Boinville - Sprinter Sacre (2015), Jonbon (2023, 2024)
- Harry Skelton - Nube Negra (2021, 2022), L'eau Du Sud (2025)

Leading trainer (5 wins):

- Nicky Henderson – Kid Cassidy (2013), Sprinter Sacre (2015), Jonbon (2023, 2024, 2026)

== Winners ==
Year	Winner	Age	Jockey	Trainer
2009	Well Chief	10	Timmy Murphy	David Pipe
2010	Gauvain	8	Daryl Jacob	Nick Williams
2011	Gauvain	9	Noel Fehily	Nick Williams
2012	Wishfull Thinking	9	Richard Johnson	Philip Hobbs
2013	Kid Cassidy	7	Tony McCoy	Nicky Henderson
2014	Uxizandre	6	Barry Geraghty	Alan King
2015	Sprinter Sacre	9	Nico de Boinville	Nicky Henderson
2016	Fox Norton	6	Aidan Coleman	Colin Tizzard
2017	Fox Norton	7	Bryan Cooper	Colin Tizzard
2018	Sceau Royal	6	Daryl Jacob	Alan King
2019	Defi Du Seuil	6	Barry Geraghty	Philip Hobbs
2020	Put The Kettle On	6	Aidan Coleman	Henry de Bromhead
2021	Nube Negra	7	Harry Skelton	Dan Skelton
2022	Nube Negra	8	Harry Skelton	Dan Skelton
2023	Jonbon	7	Nico de Boinville	Nicky Henderson
2024	Jonbon	8	Nico de Boinville	Nicky Henderson
2025	L'eau Du Sud	7	Harry Skelton	Dan Skelton
2026	Jonbon	10	Harry Cobden	Nicky Henderson

== See also ==
- Horse racing in Great Britain
- List of British National Hunt races
