= Sprinter Sacre =

French-bred racehorse

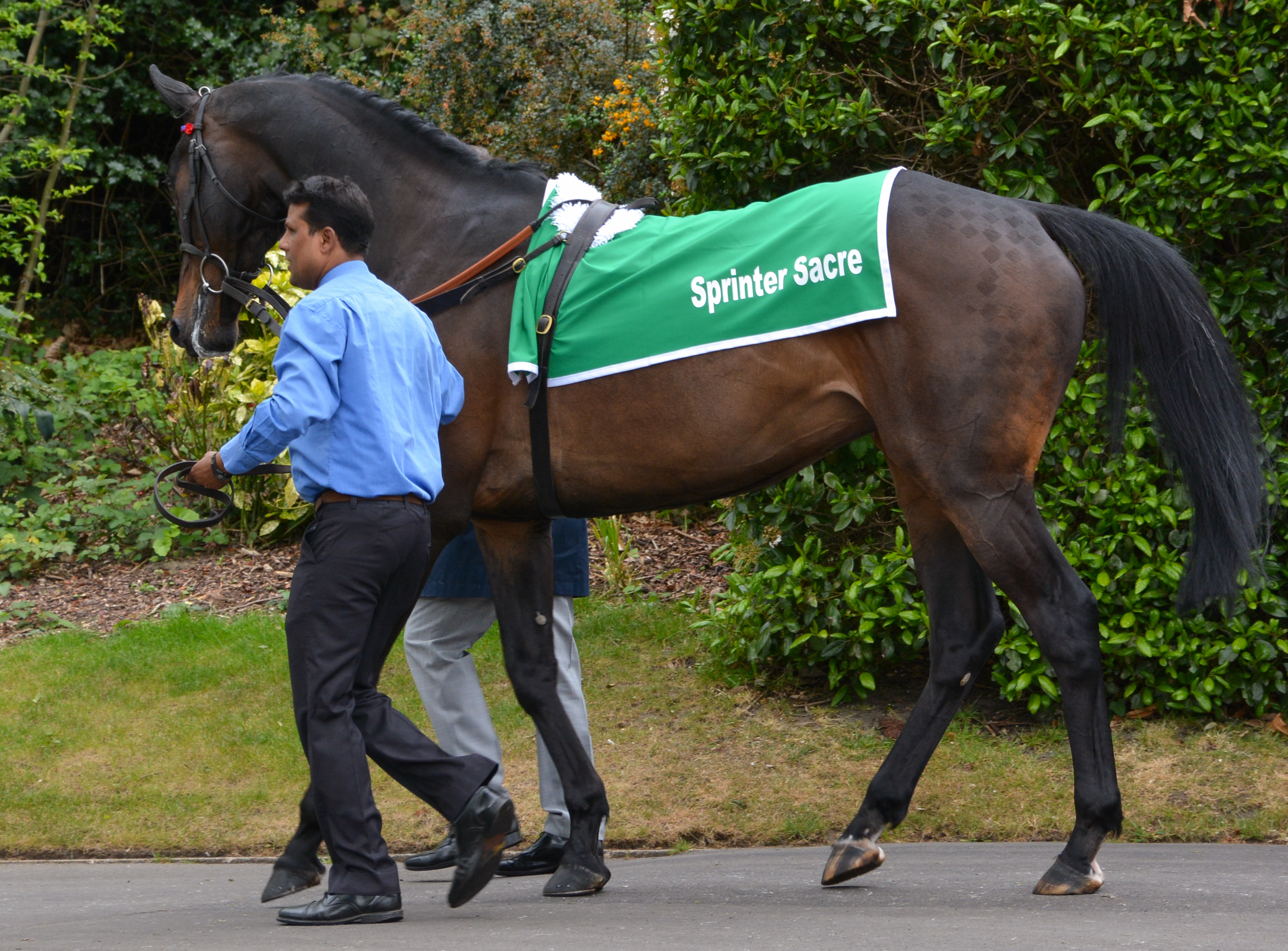
- Sprinter Sacre at Sandown in April 2017
- Sire: Network
- Grandsire: Monsun
- Dam: Fatima III
- Damsire: Bayolidaan
- Sex: Gelding
- Foaled: 23 April 2006
- Country: France
- Colour: Bay or brown
- Breeder: Christophe Masle
- Owner: Caroline Mould
- Trainer: Nicky Henderson
- Record: 24: 18-3-1
- Earnings: £1,136,883

Major wins
- Wayward Lad Novices' Chase (2011); Game Spirit Chase (2012); Arkle Challenge Trophy (2012); Maghull Novices' Chase (2012); Tingle Creek Chase (2012); Victor Chandler Chase (2013); Queen Mother Champion Chase (2013, 2016); Melling Chase (2013); Punchestown Champion Chase (2013); Shloer Chase (2015); Desert Orchid Chase (2015); Celebration Chase (2016)

Sprinter Sacre (foaled 23 April 2006), is a French-bred, British-trained Selle Français racehorse. He currently has the third highest ever Timeform steeplechase rating of 192p, behind only Arkle on 212 and Flyingbolt on 210 as their highest in the modern era.

After being imported from France, Sprinter Sacre won two National Hunt flat races in 2010 and two hurdle races in 2011. In the 2011/2012 National Hunt season he was campaigned in Novice steeplechases and was unbeaten in five races including the Wayward Lad Novices' Chase, Game Spirit Chase, Arkle Challenge Trophy and Maghull Novices' Chase. In the following season he proved himself an outstanding two-mile chaser, recording emphatic wins in the Tingle Creek Chase, Victor Chandler Chase, Queen Mother Champion Chase, Melling Chase and Punchestown Champion Chase.

Sprinter Sacre then suffered from a series of health and injury problems and failed to win in the next two seasons, during which he made only four racecourse appearances. In the 2015/16 season, he made a return to form and was unbeaten in four chases. He won the Shloer Chase and the Desert Orchid Chase before taking a second Queen Mother Champion Chase and then ended his season with a runaway victory in the Celebration Chase. He was retired from racing in November 2016 having won eighteen of his twenty-four races.

== Background ==
Sprinter Sacre is a brown gelding sired by the German Thoroughbred stallion Network, whose progeny also include the French steeplechaser Rubi Ball (Prix La Haye Jousselin) and the Irish-trained Rubi Light (John Durkan Memorial Punchestown Chase). His dam, Fatima III was a Selle Français mare. In 2009 he was part of a "job lot" of 22 French horses bought for 300,000 euros by Raymond and Caroline Mould.

Throughout his racing career, he has been owned by Caroline Mould and trained by Nicky Henderson at Upper Lambourn in Berkshire. During his time at Upper Lambourn, he was lodged in what Henderson described as "a funny old barn at the back of the yard in the dark", adding that "he likes his little corner and likes doing his own thing".

== Racing career ==
=== 2009/2010: National Hunt Flat ===
Sprinter Sacre made his first appearance in a National Hunt Flat race at Ascot in February 2010. Ridden by Barry Geraghty, he took the lead a furlong from the finish and held the late challenge of King of the Night to win by a nose. Two months later, he was sent to Ayr, where he won a similar event by 4 lengths without being extended.

=== 2010/2011: Novice Hurdles ===
In November 2010, Sprinter Sacre contested his first jump race, a novice hurdle over two and a half miles at Ascot. He started 6/5 favourite and finished second to the six-year-old Frascati Park. After a break of three months, he reappeared in a two-mile novices' hurdle at Ffos Las and won by 10 lengths. Two weeks later he won a hurdle race at Ascot by 7 lengths "on the bridle" and was then sent to the Cheltenham Festival for the Supreme Novices' Hurdle. Ridden by Tony McCoy, Sprinter Sacre took the lead three hurdles from the finish but hit the last obstacle and faded to finish third to Al Ferof and stablemate Spirit Son, who never raced again.

=== 2011/2012: Novice Chases ===
Sprinter Sacre made his first appearance in a steeplechase at Doncaster in December 2011. He started at odds of 2/9 and won by 24 lengths from Lightening Rod. At the end of December, he was moved up to Grade II class for the Wayward Lad Novices' Chase at Kempton in which he was matched against Peddlers Cross, the runner-up in the 2011 Champion Hurdle. Sprinter Sacre led from the start and drew clear in the closing stages to win by 16 lengths. ESPN described his jumping as "sublime" and quoted his jockey, Barry Geraghty, as saying: "He's one of the best I've ever sat on – he is frighteningly good."

In February 2012, Sprinter Sacre moved out of novice company to take on more experienced chasers in the Game Spirit Chase at Newbury. Ridden by Barry Geraghty, he took the lead at half way and recorded a 6-length win from French Opera at odds of 2/5. Sprinter Sacre was then sent to Cheltenham for the Arkle Challenge Trophy where his rivals included Al Ferof, Menorah and Cue Card. Taking the lead four fences from the finish, he was never in danger and won by 7 lengths despite being eased in the closing stages. Geraghty described the race as the equivalent of a "schooling session" and described the horse as "the special one". The Guardian called the performance "scintillating" and described the winner as being "simply in a league of his own". Only three horses appeared to challenge Sprinter Sacre in the Maghull Novices' Chase at Aintree a month later. He started at odds of 1/7 and "made mincemeat" of his rivals recording a very impressive 13 lengths win from Toubab. After the race, Henderson was effusive in his praise, calling him "frightening... extraordinary... he has this aura about him."

=== 2012/2013: Senior Chases ===
Sprinter Sacre made his first appearance of the new season on 8 December in the Grade I Tingle Creek Chase at Sandown, in which he was opposed by the Paul Nicholls-trained Sanctuaire, who had won all three of his steeplechases including the Celebration Chase. Sanctuaire set a strong pace and opened up a long lead, but Sprinter Sacre took up the lead four fences from home and drew steadily clear to win by 15 lengths. His next run was scheduled to take place in the Grade I Victor Chandler Chase at Ascot on 19 January, but the race meeting was abandoned and rescheduled for Cheltenham a week later. Starting at odds of 1/5, Sprinter Sacre took the lead at the seventh fence, drew clear from his six opponents, and won by 14 lengths from the 50/1 outsider Mad Moose.

In the Queen Mother Champion Chase at Cheltenham on 13 March, Sprinter Sacre started at odds of 1/4, the shortest price at the Cheltenham festival since Arkle won his third Cheltenham Gold Cup at 1/10 in 1966. He cruised for 12 furlongs and then, 4 out, joined the front-running Sizing Europe, who had set a fast pace throughout. With Geraghty sitting motionless, he won by 19 lengths from Sizing Europe without ever being ridden out to claim his 8th win in 8 attempts over fences. On 5 April 2013, he lined up against four rivals in the John Smiths Melling Chase in his first attempt over fences at 2 1/2 miles. Sprinter Sacre was sent off 1/3 favourite and won by 4 1/2 lengths from Ryanair Chase winner Cue Card. Back in third place, beaten a further 19 lengths, was crack Irish contender Flemenstar. On 23 April, he extended his unbeaten chase record to 10 as he defeated Sizing Europe by five lengths in the Punchestown Champion Chase.

He became the first horse since Istabraq in 1999 to win at all three major spring jumping Festivals, Punchestown, Cheltenham and Aintree.

=== 2013/2014: Senior Chases ===
On his first appearance of the next season, Sprinter Sacre started 2/9 favourite for Desert Orchid Chase at Kempton Park Racecourse on 27 December. After tracking the leaders in the early stages, he began to struggle at the seventh fence and was quickly pulled up by Geraghty. Post-race tests revealed that the horse was suffering from an irregular heartbeat. On 23 February 2014, Henderson announced that the gelding had recovered from his heart problems but would miss the rest of the season as he was "not working with his usual brilliance".

=== 2014/2015: Senior Chases ===
Sprinter Sacre missed a planned run in the Tingle Creek Trophy but performed well in a racecourse gallop at Newbury in late December. After an absence of over a year, the gelding returned in the Clarence House Chase at Ascot on 17 January. After racing in fourth place for most of the way, he moved up to take the lead in the straight but was overtaken approaching the final fence and finished second to Dodging Bullets. At the Cheltenham Festival 11 March 2015, Sprinter Sacre started favourite for the Queen Mother Champion Chase but faded by the last two jumps and pulled up in a race won by Dodging Bullets. The gelding was treated for a back problem following the race and returned to contest the Celebration Chase at Sandown on 25 April, finishing second of the seven runners behind Special Tiara.

=== 2015/2016: Senior Chases ===
The next season, Henderson was giving encouraging reports that Sprinter Sacre was "giving us good vibes" and on 15 November, Sprinter Sacre confirmed it in his seasonal debut by taking the Grade 2 Shloer Chase by 15 lengths from his old rival Somersby, the runner-up of the 2015 Champion Chase. After Sprinter Sacre had recorded his first win in two and a half years, his rider, Nico de Boinville, commented, "He was jumping and travelling like his old self and he did that well in the end, even kicking clear after the last and putting them to the sword. I haven't got a clue what the plans are – I'm just enjoying the moment". On 27 December, Sprinter Sacre was matched against Sire de Grugy, Somersby, and Vibrato Valtat (Henry VIII Novices' Chase, Haldon Gold Cup) in the Desert Orchid Chase at Kempton on 27 December. After racing in fourth place, he took the lead at the last fence and held off the sustained challenge of Sire de Grugy to win by three-quarters of a length. After the race, Henderson said, "Today he had to be a completely different Sprinter... They had to be very brave at the last, but he's that sort of horse – he's got the class but sometimes you have to tough it out as well."

On 16 March 2016, Sprinter Sacre contested his third Queen Mother Champion Chase at the Cheltenham Festival. He started the 5/1 second favourite behind the Irish-trained Un de Sceaux, whilst the other eight runners included Dodging Bullets, Sire de Grugy, Felix Yonger (Punchestown Champion Chase), Special Tiara, and Somersby. Special Tiara and Un de Sceaux set a very fast pace with Nico de Boinville settling Sprinter Sacre behind the leaders. Despite a mistake three fences from home, Sprinter Sacre made rapid progress to take the lead approaching the second last and quickly went several lengths clear. He stayed on up the run-in to win the race by three and a half lengths and a nose from Un de Sceaux and Special Tiara. Commenting on the ten-year-old's return to form, Henderson said, "He's just been so feisty and aggressive all season... I’ve been looking at him every night for the last three weeks and I just knew that it was still there, and his whole body said that it was. It's just talent, isn’t it?"

On 23 April, Sprinter Sacre ended his season in the Celebration Chase at Sandown Park on 23 April. He started the 11/10 favourite ahead of Un de Sceaux with the best fancied of the other four runners being Sire de Grugy and Dodging Bullets. Nico de Boinville settled Sprinter Sacre behind the leaders, Un de Sceaux and Sire de Grugy, before making rapid progress to take the lead at the third last. He drew away from his rivals over the last two fences and won by fifteen lengths from Un de Sceaux.

== Retirement ==
Sprinter Sacre was being prepared for a return to the racecourse in the Tingle Creek Chase when he sustained a leg tendon injury in training. On 13 November Nicky Henderson announced that the horse had been retired from racing. He was paraded by his lad Sarwah Mohammed in the paddock at Cheltenham racecourse before the Shloer Chase. In a press conference, the trainer described Sprinter Sacre as "the horse of an absolute lifetime" and said "His ability and charisma go together. He is the epitome of the horse who looks the part, moves the part and is the part. Life will have to go on without him. It has been such an emotional time over the last five or six years but I have loved every minute of it."

Sprinter Sacre has spent his retirement in the Cotswolds where he was cared for by Vicki Roberts. In April 2025 Roberts said "He's very well. I think he enjoys retirement; he's settled, he's muddy, he's happy." He has often been paraded at major racecourses on big race days and retains a strong following of supporters.

== Pedigree ==
Pedigree of Sprinter Sacre (FR), bay or brown gelding, 2006
Sire Network (GER) 1997	Monsun; 1990	Koenigsstuhl	Dschingis Khan
Sire Network (GER) 1997	Monsun; 1990	Koenigsstuhl	Koenigskronung
Sire Network (GER) 1997	Monsun; 1990	Mosella	Surumu
Sire Network (GER) 1997	Monsun; 1990	Mosella	Monasia
Sire Network (GER) 1997	Note; 1977	Reliance	Tantieme
Sire Network (GER) 1997	Note; 1977	Reliance	Relance
Sire Network (GER) 1997	Note; 1977	Nicotiana	Naras
Sire Network (GER) 1997	Note; 1977	Nicotiana	Nina
Dam Fatima III (FR) 1993	Bayolidaan; 1984	Kamaridaan	Djakao
Dam Fatima III (FR) 1993	Bayolidaan; 1984	Kamaridaan	Diamond Drop
Dam Fatima III (FR) 1993	Bayolidaan; 1984	Bayonne	Stymphale
Dam Fatima III (FR) 1993	Bayolidaan; 1984	Bayonne	Belsta
Dam Fatima III (FR) 1993	Viva Sacree; 1987	Maiymad	Rheingold
Dam Fatima III (FR) 1993	Viva Sacree; 1987	Maiymad	Miss Melody
Dam Fatima III (FR) 1993	Viva Sacree; 1987	Kiki Sacree	Edellic
Dam Fatima III (FR) 1993	Viva Sacree; 1987	Kiki Sacree	Amie Sacree
