= Queen Mother Champion Chase =

Steeplechase horse race in Britain

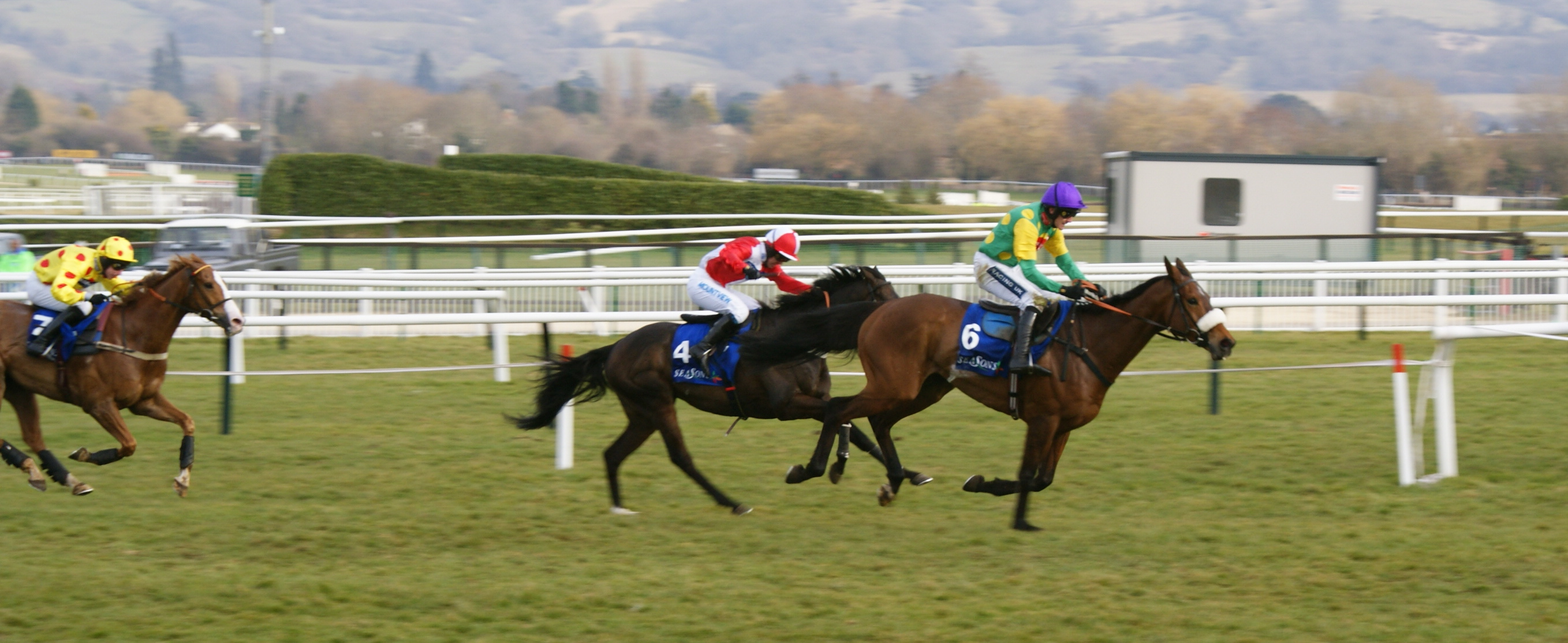
- Class: Grade 1
- Location: Cheltenham Racecourse; Cheltenham, England
- Inaugurated: 1959
- Race type: steeplechase
- Sponsor: BetMGM
- Website: Cheltenham

Race information
- Distance: 1m 7f 199y (3,199 metres)
- Surface: Turf
- Track: Left-handed
- Qualification: Five-years-old and up
- Weight: 11 st 10 lb Allowances; 7 lb for mares
- Purse: £400,000 (2025); 1st: £225,080

Queen Mother Champion Chase
2026
Il Etait Temps	Libberty Hunter	L'eau Du Sud

Previous years
2025
Marine Nationale	Jonbon	Captain Guinness
2024
Captain Guinness	Gentleman De Mee	Funambule Sivola
2023
Energumene	Captain Guinness	Greaneteen
2022
Energumene	Funambule Sivola	Envoi Allen
2021
Put The Kettle On	Nube Negra	Chacun Pour Soi

2020-2011
2020
Politologue	Dynamite Dollars	Bun Doran
2019
Altior	Politologue	Sceau Royal
2018
Altior	Min	God's Own
2017
Special Tiara	Fox Norton	Sir Valentino
2016
Sprinter Sacre	Un De Sceaux	Special Tiara
2015
Dodging Bullets	Somersby	Special Tiara
2014
Sire De Grugy	Somersby	Module
2013
Sprinter Sacre	Sizing Europe	Wishfull Thinking
2012
Finian's Rainbow	Sizing Europe	Big Zeb
2011
Sizing Europe	Big Zeb	Captain Cee Bee

2010–2001
2010
Big Zeb	Forpadydeplasterer	Kalahari King
2009
Master Minded	Well Chief	Petit Robin
2008
Master Minded	Voy Por Ustedes	Fair Along
2007
Voy Por Ustedes	Dempsey	River City
2006
Newmill	Fota Island	Mister McGoldrick
2005
Moscow Flyer	Well Chief	Azertyuiop
2004
Azertyuiop	Flagship Uberalles	Tiutchev
2003
Moscow Flyer	Native Upmanship	Cenkos
2002
Flagship Uberalles	Native Upmanship	Cenkos

2000–1991
2000
Edredon Bleu	Direct Route	Flagship Uberalles
1999
Call Equiname	Edredon Bleu	Direct Route
1998
One Man	Or Royal	Lord Dorcet
1997
Martha's Son	Ask Tom	Viking Flagship
1996
Klairon Davis	Viking Flagship	Sound Man
1995
Viking Flagship	Deep Sensation	Nakir
1994
Viking Flagship	Travado	Deep Sensation
1993
Deep Sensation	Cyphrate	Katabatic
1992
Remittance Man	Katabatic	Waterloo Boy
1991
Katabatic	Waterloo Boy	Nos Na Gaoithe

1990–1981
1990
Barnbrook Again	Waterloo Boy	Feroda
1989
Barnbrook Again	Royal Stag	Beau Ranger
1988
Pearlyman	Desert Orchid	Very Promising
1987
Pearlyman	Very Promising	Desert Orchid
1986
Buck House	Very Promising	Kathies Lad
1985
Badsworth Boy	Far Bridge	Kyoto
1984
Badsworth Boy	Little Bay	Artifice
1983
Badsworth Boy	Artifice	News King
1982
Rathgorman	Chinrullah	Drumgora
1981
Drumgora	Anaglogs Daughter	Stopped

1980–1978
1980
Another Dolly	King Weasel	Hilly Way
1979
Hilly Way	Dramatist	Young Arthur
1978
Hilly Way	Menehall	Kilmakilloge

The Queen Mother Champion Chase is a Grade 1 National Hunt steeplechase in Great Britain which is open to horses aged five years or older. As part of a sponsorship agreement with the online betting company BetMGM, the race is now known as the BetMGM Queen Mother Champion Chase. It is run on the Old Course at Cheltenham over a distance of about 2 miles (1 mile 7 furlongs and 199 yards, or 3,199 metres), and during its running there are thirteen fences to be jumped. The race is scheduled to take place each year during the Cheltenham Festival in March.

It is the leading minimum-distance chase in the National Hunt calendar, and it is the feature race on the second day of the Festival.

== History ==
The event was established in 1959, and it was originally called the National Hunt Two-Mile Champion Chase. It was given its present title in 1980 – the year of the Queen Mother's 80th birthday – in recognition of her support to jump racing. The Queen Mother was a successful owner of National Hunt horses, particularly chasers, and among these was Game Spirit – the runner-up in this race in 1976.

The Queen Mother Champion Chase was not sponsored before 2007, and between 2008 and 2010 it was backed by Seasons Holidays. The sponsor from 2011 until 2013 was online gambling firm Sportingbet. BetVictor held naming rights for the 2014 season before the current sponsor, sports betting company Betway, took over.

== Records ==
Most successful horse (3 wins):

- Badsworth Boy – 1983, 1984, 1985

Leading jockey (5 wins):

- Pat Taaffe – Fortria (1960, 1961), Ben Stack (1964), Flyingbolt (1966), Straight Fort (1970)
- Barry Geraghty – Moscow Flyer (2003, 2005), Big Zeb (2010), Finian's Rainbow (2012), Sprinter Sacre (2013)

Leading trainer (6 wins):

- Tom Dreaper – Fortria (1960, 1961), Ben Stack (1964), Flyingbolt (1966), Muir (1969), Straight Fort (1970)
- Nicky Henderson - Remittance Man (1992), Finian's Rainbow (2012), Sprinter Sacre (2013, 2016), Altior (2018, 2019)
- Paul Nicholls - Call Equiname (1999), Azertyuiop (2004), Master Minded (2008, 2009), Dodging Bullets (2015), Politologue (2020)

Leading owner (3 wins):

- George Ansley – Fortria (1960, 1961), Straight Fort (1970)
- Doug Armitage – Badsworth Boy (1983, 1984, 1985)
- John Hales - One Man (1998), Azertyuiop (2004), Politologue (2020)

== Winners ==
Year	Winner	Age	Jockey	Trainer	Owner
1959	Quita Que	10	Bunny Cox	Dan Moore	Mrs D. R. Brand
1960	Fortria	8	Pat Taaffe	Tom Dreaper	George Ansley
1961	Fortria	9	Pat Taaffe	Tom Dreaper	George Ansley
1962	Piperton	8	Dave Dick	Archie Thomlinson	Archie Thomlinson
1963	Sandy Abbot	8	Stan Mellor	George Owen	Mrs J. D. McKechnie
1964	Ben Stack	7	Pat Taaffe	Tom Dreaper	The Duchess of Westminster
1965	Dunkirk	8	Dave Dick	Peter Cazalet	Bill Whitbread
1966	Flyingbolt	7	Pat Taaffe	Tom Dreaper	Jean Wilkinson
1967	Drinny's Double	9	Frank Nash	Bob Turnell	Paul Mellon
1968	Drinny's Double	10	Frank Nash	Bob Turnell	Paul Mellon
1969	Muir	10	Ben Hannon	Tom Dreaper	Waring Willis
1970	Straight Fort	7	Pat Taaffe	Tom Dreaper	George Ansley
1971	Crisp	8	Paul Kelleway	Fred Winter	Sir Chester Manifold
1972	Royal Relief	8	Bill Smith	Edward Courage	Edward Courage
1973	Inkslinger	6	Tommy Carberry	Dan Moore	Mrs M. Jenney
1974	Royal Relief	10	Bill Smith	Edward Courage	Edward Courage
1975	Lough Inagh	8	Sean Barker	Jim Dreaper	A. Martin
1976	Skymas	11	Mouse Morris	Brian Lusk	Matt Magee
1977	Skymas	12	Mouse Morris	Brian Lusk	Matt Magee
1978	Hilly Way	8	Tommy Carmody	Peter McCreery	J. W. Sweeney
1979	Hilly Way	9	Ted Walsh (Note: amateur jockey)	Peter McCreery	J. W. Sweeney
1980	Another Dolly (Note: Chinrullah finished first in 1980, but he was subsequently disqualified after testing positive for a banned substance)	10	Sam Morshead	Fred Rimell	Ian Urquhart
1981	Drumgora	9	Frank Berry	Arthur Moore	D. Monahan
1982	Rathgorman	10	Kevin Whyte	Michael Dickinson	J. Lilley
1983	Badsworth Boy	8	Robert Earnshaw	Michael Dickinson	Doug Armitage
1984	Badsworth Boy	9	Robert Earnshaw	Michael Dickinson	Doug Armitage
1985	Badsworth Boy	10	Robert Earnshaw	Monica Dickinson	Doug Armitage
1986	Buck House	8	Tommy Carmody	Mouse Morris	Mrs Phil Purcell
1987	Pearlyman	8	Peter Scudamore	John Edwards	Valerie Shaw
1988	Pearlyman	9	Tom Morgan	John Edwards	Valerie Shaw
1989	Barnbrook Again	8	Simon Sherwood	David Elsworth	Mel Davies
1990	Barnbrook Again	9	Hywel Davies	David Elsworth	Mel Davies
1991	Katabatic	8	Simon McNeill	Andrew Turnell	Pell-Mell Partners
1992	Remittance Man	8	Jamie Osborne	Nicky Henderson	Tim Collins
1993	Deep Sensation	8	Declan Murphy	Josh Gifford	Robin Eliot
1994	Viking Flagship	7	Adrian Maguire	David Nicholson	Roach Foods Ltd
1995	Viking Flagship	8	Charlie Swan	David Nicholson	Roach Foods Ltd
1996	Klairon Davis	7	Francis Woods	Arthur Moore	Chris Jones
1997	Martha's Son	10	Rodney Farrant	Tim Forster	Hartigan / Ward-Thomas
1998	One Man	10	Brian Harding	Gordon W. Richards	John Hales
1999	Call Equiname	9	Mick Fitzgerald	Paul Nicholls	Coburn / Barber / Lewis
2000	Edredon Bleu	8	Tony McCoy	Henrietta Knight	Jim Lewis
	no race 2001 (Note: The 2001 running was cancelled because of a foot-and-mouth crisis. A substitute race at Sandown was won by Edredon Bleu)
2002	Flagship Uberalles	8	Richard Johnson	Philip Hobbs	Gutner / Krysztofiak
2003	Moscow Flyer	9	Barry Geraghty	Jessica Harrington	Brian Kearney
2004	Azertyuiop	7	Ruby Walsh	Paul Nicholls	John Hales
2005	Moscow Flyer	11	Barry Geraghty	Jessica Harrington	Brian Kearney
2006	Newmill	8	Andrew McNamara	John Joseph Murphy	Mary Hayes
2007	Voy Por Ustedes	6	Robert Thornton	Alan King	Sir Robert Ogden
2008	Master Minded	5	Ruby Walsh	Paul Nicholls	Clive D. Smith
2009	Master Minded	6	Ruby Walsh	Paul Nicholls	Clive D. Smith
2010	Big Zeb	9	Barry Geraghty	Colm Murphy	Patrick Joseph Redmond
2011	Sizing Europe	9	Andrew Lynch	Henry de Bromhead	Ann & Alan Potts
2012	Finian's Rainbow	9	Barry Geraghty	Nicky Henderson	Michael Buckley
2013	Sprinter Sacre	7	Barry Geraghty	Nicky Henderson	Caroline Mould
2014	Sire De Grugy	8	Jamie Moore	Gary Moore	Preston Family & Friends
2015	Dodging Bullets	7	Sam Twiston-Davies	Paul Nicholls	Martin Broughton & Friends
2016	Sprinter Sacre	10	Nico de Boinville	Nicky Henderson	Caroline Mould
2017	Special Tiara	10	Noel Fehily	Henry de Bromhead	Sally Rowley-Williams
2018	Altior	8	Nico de Boinville	Nicky Henderson	Patricia Pugh
2019	Altior	9	Nico de Boinville	Nicky Henderson	Patricia Pugh
2020	Politologue	9	Harry Skelton	Paul Nicholls	John Hales
2021	Put The Kettle On	7	Aidan Coleman	Henry de Bromhead	One For Luck Racing Syndicate
2022	Energumene	8	Paul Townend	Willie Mullins	Tony Bloom
2023	Energumene	9	Paul Townend	Willie Mullins	Tony Bloom
2024	Captain Guinness	9	Rachael Blackmore	Henry de Bromhead	Declan Landy
2025	Marine Nationale	8	Sean Flanagan	Barry Connell	Barry Connell
2026	Il Etait Temps	8	Paul Townend	Willie Mullins	Hollywood Racing & Barnane Stud

== See also ==
- Horse racing in Great Britain
- List of British National Hunt races
- Recurring sporting events established in 1959 – this race is included under its original title, National Hunt Two-Mile Champion Chase.
