= Nico de Boinville =

English jockey competing in National Hunt racing

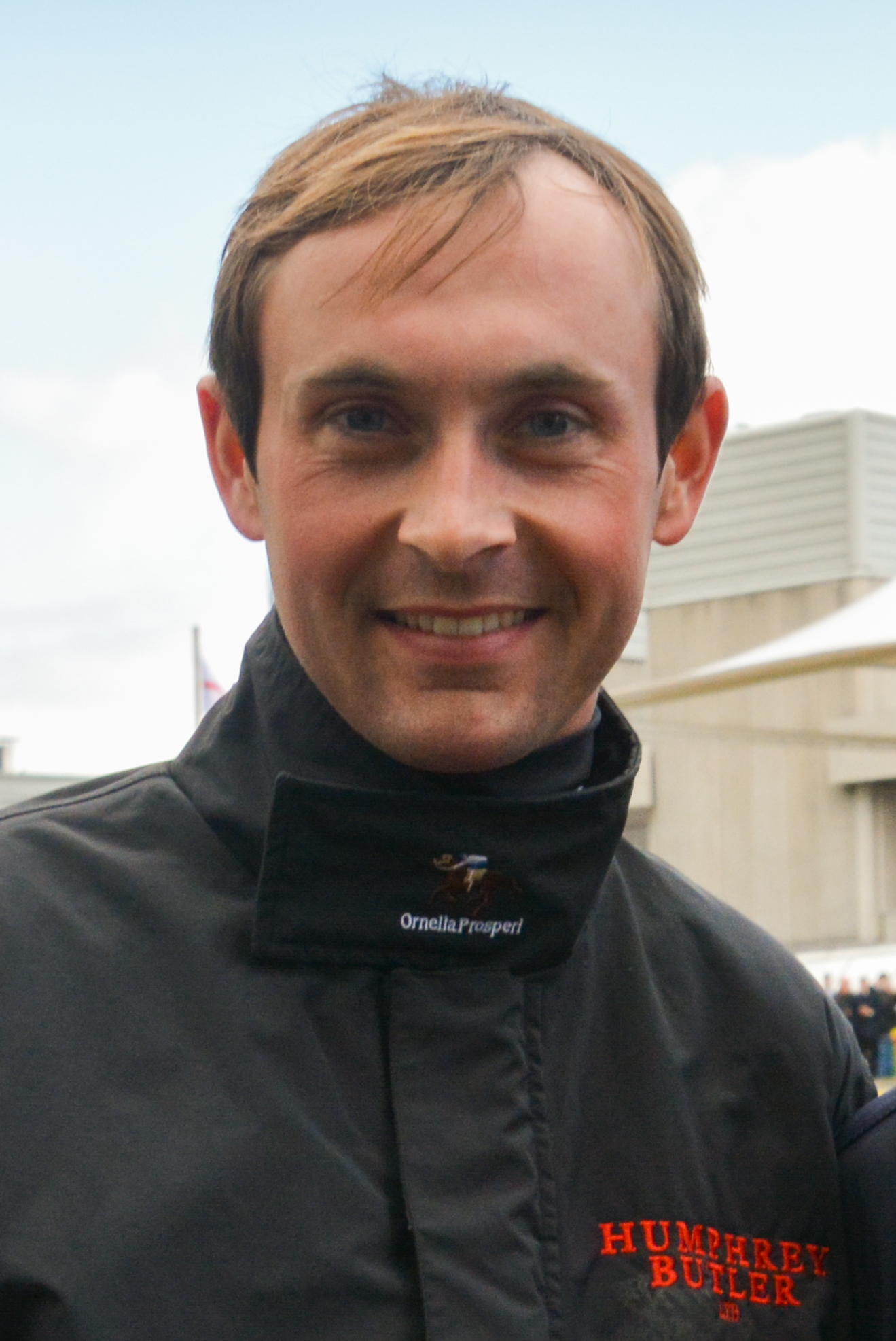
- Nico de Boinville in 2016

Personal information
- Full name: Nicolai William Chastel de Boinville
- Born: 14 August 1989 (age 37) Baughurst, Hampshire
- Occupation: Jockey
- Spouse: Serena
- Children: 2

Horse racing career
- Sport: Horse racing

Major racing wins
- Cheltenham Gold Cup, Queen Mother Champion Chase, Arkle Challenge Trophy, RSA Chase, Supreme Novices Hurdle, Triumph Hurdle, David Nicholson Mares Hurdle, Golden Miller Novices Chase, Coral Cup, Anniversary 4-Y-O Novices Hurdle, Betway Bowl, Celebration Chase, Christmas Hurdle, Clarence House Chase, Kauto Star Novices Hurdle, King George VI Chase, Liverpool Hurdle, Maghull Novices Chase, Mildmay Novices Chase, Sefton Novices Hurdle, Tingle Creek Chase, Tolworth Novices Hurdle, Mares Champion Hurdle IRE, Grand National Hurdle Stakes USA

Significant horses
- Altior, Brain Power, Chantry House, Coneygree, Constitution Hill, Epatante, Jonbon, Marie's Rock, Might Bite, Pentland Hills, Shishkin, Sir Gino, Sprinter Sacre, Whisper, William Henry, Verdana Blue

Nicolai William Chastel de Boinville (born 14 August 1989) is an English horse racing jockey who competes in National Hunt racing. De Boinville has ridden more Grade One winners than any British jumps jockey currently active.

== Early life ==
The son of an insurance broker, de Boinville was educated at Bradfield College, a public school in the village of Bradfield in Berkshire, followed by the Newcastle University. He studied Politics at Newcastle, but left during his first year in order to pursue a career in horse racing.

== Career ==
De Boinville started his racing career as a stable lad at Nicky Henderson's Seven Barrows stables.

After being a professional jockey for just over a year, de Boinville won the 2015 Cheltenham Gold Cup riding Coneygree for trainer Mark Bradstock. Since then, de Boinville has partnered horses such as Altior, Shishkin, Sprinter Sacre and Might Bite to his total 15 victories at the Cheltenham Festival.

In 2019, de Boinville became the top jockey at the Cheltenham Festival with 3 wins. He also won the Grand National Hurdle Stakes at Far Hills, USA with Brain Power in 2019.

He won his first grade 1 in Ireland when he partnered Marie's Rock to win the 2022 Mares Champion Hurdle at Punchestown.

== Cheltenham Festival winners (18) ==
- Cheltenham Gold Cup – (1) Coneygree (2015)
- Queen Mother Champion Chase – (3) – Sprinter Sacre (2016) Altior (2018, 2019)
- Champion Hurdle - Constitution Hill (2023)
- Arkle Challenge Trophy – (3) – Altior (2017), Shishkin (2021), Jango Baie (2025)
- RSA Insurance Novices' Chase – (1) Might Bite (2017)
- Supreme Novices' Hurdle – (4) – Altior (2016), Shishkin (2020), Constitution Hill (2022), Old Park Star (2026)
- David Nicholson Mares' Hurdle – (1) – Marie's Rock (2022)
- Triumph Hurdle – (1) Pentland Hills (2019)
- Golden Miller Novices' Chase – (1) Chantry House (2021)
- Coral Cup – (2) Whisper (2014), William Henry (2019)

== Major wins ==
(United Kingdom) Great Britain

- Anniversary 4-Y-O Novices' Hurdle – (2) Pentland Hills (2019), Sir Gino (2024)
- Ascot Chase - (2) Shishkin (2023), Jonbon (2026)
- Betway Bowl – (3) Might Bite (2018), Shishkin (2023), Jango Baie (2026)
- Celebration Chase – (3) – Sprinter Sacre (2016), Altior (2017), Jonbon (2024)
- Christmas Hurdle – (6) Verdana Blue (2018), Epatante (2021), Constitution Hill (2022, 2023, 2024), Sir Gino (2025)
- Clarence House Chase – (3) Altior (2019), Shishkin (2022), Jonbon (2025)
- Fighting Fifth Hurdle - (2) Constitution Hill (2022), Sir Gino (2024)
- Henry VIII Novices' Chase - (1) Lulamba (2025)
- Kauto Star Novices' Chase – (1) Conyegree (2015)
- King George VI Chase – (1) Might Bite (2017)
- Liverpool Hurdle – (1) Whisper (2015)
- Long Walk Hurdle - (1) Impose Toi (2025)
- Maghull Novices' Chase – (1) Shishkin (2021)
- Melling Chase - (2) Jonbon (2024, 2025)
- Mildmay Novices' Chase – (2) Might Bite (2017), Chantry House (2021)
- Sefton Novices' Hurdle – (1) Santini (2018)
- Tingle Creek Chase – (3) Altior (2018), Jonbon (2023, 2024)
- Tolworth Novices' Hurdle – (1) Constitution Hill (2022)

(Republic of Ireland) Ireland

- Mares Champion Hurdle – (1) Marie's Rock (2022)

United States

- Grand National Hurdle Stakes – (1) Brain Power (2019)
