= Rising Stars Novices' Chase =

Steeplechase horse race in Britain

- Class: Grade 2
- Location: Wincanton, Wincanton, England
- Race type: Steeplechase
- Sponsor: Boodles
- Website: Wincanton

Race information
- Distance: 2m 4f 35y (4,055 metres)
- Surface: Turf
- Track: Right-handed
- Qualification: Four-years-old and up
- Weight: 10 st 9 lb (4yo); 11 st 4 lb (5yo+); Allowances; 7 lb for fillies and mares Penalties for wins 5 lb for Class 1 wfa steeplechase 3 lb for Class 1 handicap or Class 2 wfa steeplechase
- Purse: £75,000 (2025); 1st: £44,580

Rising Stars Novices' Chase
2026
Taurus Bay	Talk To The Man	Favour And Fortune

Previous years
2025
Blueking D'oroux	Breaking Cover	Rightsotom
2024
Boombawn	Soul Icon	Insurrection
2023
Knappers Hill	Lady Adare	Captain Conby
2022
Hang In There	Mortlach	Uhtred
2021
Captain Tom Cat	Mick Pastor	Jacamar

2020-2011
2020
Ga Law	Hurricane Harvey	Grand Sancy
2019
Reserve Tank	If You Say Run	Commanche Red
2018
Bags Groove	Secret Investor	Theligny
2017
Modus	Kalondra	Only two finished
2016
Frodon	Finished alone
2015
Junction Fourteen	Arpege D'alene	L'unique
2014
Southfield Theatre	Hollow Penny	Horizontal Speed
2013
Wonderful Charm	Fox Appeal	Third Intention
2012
Houblon Des Obeaux	Poungach	Court in Motion
2011
Silviniaco Conti	Mad Moose	Only two finished

2010-2001
2010
Wishfull Thinking	Tara Royal	Intac
2009
Red Admiral	Bakbenscher	Only two finished
2008
Breedsbreeze	Ring The Boss	Hold Em
2007
Ornais	Joe Lively	Gentleman Jimmy
2006
Turko	Boychuk	Predator
2005
Celtic Son	Napolitain	Unleash
2004
Comply Or Die	Distant Thunder	Red Devil Robert
2003
Brother Joe	Puntal	Only two ran
2002
One Knight	Le Roi Miguel	Hand Inn Hand
2001
Gola Cher	Gentle Rivage	Nearly A Score

2000-1990
2000
Bindaree	Nearly A Score	Man on the Hill
1999
Lady Cricket	Beau	Riverbank Rose
1998
Irbee	Calon Lan	Moor Lane
1997
Northern Starlight	Hurdante	Romancer
1996
See More Business	Wee Windy	Buckhouse Boy
1995
Hill Of Tullow	Berude Not To	Linden's Lotto
1994
Sweet Duke	A N C Express	Newton Point
1993
Milford Quay	Its Nearly Time	Nevada Gold
1992
Run For Free	Freeline Finishing	Mighty Falcon
1990
Wingspan	Formula One	Hope Diamond

The Rising Stars Novices' Chase is a Grade 2 National Hunt steeplechase in Great Britain which is open to horses aged four years or older. It is run at Wincanton over a distance of about 2 miles and 4 furlongs (2 miles 4 furlongs and 35 yards, or 4,055 metres), and during its running there are seventeen fences to be jumped. The race is for novice chasers, and it is scheduled to take place each year in early November.

The race was first run in 1990 and was initially held at Chepstow, where it was contested over 2 miles and 3½ furlongs in February. It was switched to be run in November from 1994. The race was transferred to Wincanton and extended to its present length in 2004.

== Winners ==
Year	Winner	Age	Jockey	Trainer
1990	Wingspan	6	Peter Scudamore	Martin Pipe
1991	Abandoned due to frost
1992	Run for Free	8	Peter Scudamore	Martin Pipe
1993	Milford Quay	10	Peter Scudamore	Martin Pipe
1994 (Feb)	Abandoned due to waterlogging
1994 (Nov)	Sweet Duke	7	Carl Llewellyn	Nigel Twiston-Davies
1995	Hill of Tullow	6	Adrian Maguire	David Nicholson
1996	See More Business	6	Tony McCoy	Paul Nicholls
1997	Northern Starlight	6	Tony McCoy	Martin Pipe
1998	Irbee	6	Joe Tizzard	Paul Nicholls
1999	Lady Cricket	5	Tony McCoy	Martin Pipe
2000	Bindaree	6	Carl Llewellyn	Nigel Twiston-Davies
2001	Gola Cher	7	Robert Thornton	Alan King
2002	One Knight	6	Paul Flynn	Philip Hobbs
2003	Brother Joe	9	Richard Johnson	Philip Hobbs
2004	Comply or Die	5	Tony McCoy	Martin Pipe
2005	Celtic Son	6	Timmy Murphy	Martin Pipe
2006	Turko	4	Ruby Walsh	Paul Nicholls
2007	Ornais	5	Ruby Walsh	Paul Nicholls
2008	Breedsbreeze	6	Ruby Walsh	Paul Nicholls
2009	Red Admiral	7	Jason Maguire	Charlie Mann
2010	Wishfull Thinking	7	Richard Johnson	Philip Hobbs
2011	Silviniaco Conti	5	Daryl Jacob	Paul Nicholls
2012	Houblon des Obeaux	5	Aidan Coleman	Venetia Williams
2013	Wonderful Charm	5	Nick Scholfield	Paul Nicholls
2014	Southfield Theatre	6	Sam Twiston-Davies	Paul Nicholls
2015	Junction Fourteen	6	Daryl Jacob	Emma Lavelle
2016	Frodon	4	Harry Cobden	Paul Nicholls
2017	Modus	7	Sam Twiston-Davies	Paul Nicholls
2018	Bags Groove	7	Noel Fehily	Harry Fry
2019	Reserve Tank	5	Robbie Power	Colin Tizzard
2020	Ga Law	4	Daryl Jacob	Jamie Snowden
2021	Captain Tom Cat	6	Charlie Hammond	Richard Newland
2022	Hang In There	8	Tom Bellamy	Emma Lavelle
2023	Knappers Hill	7	Harry Cobden	Paul Nicholls
2024	Boombawn	7	Harry Skelton	Dan Skelton
2025	Blueking d'Oroux	6	Harry Cobden	Paul Nicholls
2026	Taurus Bay	5	Ben Jones	Ben Pauling

== See also ==
- Horse racing in Great Britain
- List of British National Hunt races
