= Politologue =

French-bred Thoroughbred racehorse

- Sire: Poliglote
- Grandsire: Sadler's Wells
- Dam: Scarlet Row
- Damsire: Turgeon
- Sex: Gelding
- Foaled: 12 May 2011
- Country: France
- Colour: Grey
- Breeder: Mme Henri Devin
- Owner: Sophie Devin; John Hales
- Trainer: Etienne Leenders; Paul Nicholls
- Record: 31: 12-9-0
- Earnings: £1,038,065

Major wins
- Bathwick Tyres Novices' Hurdle (2016); Noel Novices' Chase (2016); Haldon Gold Cup (2017); Tingle Creek Chase (2017, 2020); Desert Orchid Chase (2017); Melling Chase (2018); 1965 Chase (2018); Champion Chase (2020)

Politologue (foaled 12 May 2011) is a French-bred racehorse who competed in National Hunt racing. After winning one race in his native country he was sent to race in England and won two Novice Hurdle races in the 2015/16 season. In the following season he began to compete in steeplechases and won three races including the Noel Novices' Chase. In his next campaign he emerged as a top-class chaser over two and two and a half miles as he recorded victories in the Haldon Gold Cup, Tingle Creek Chase, Desert Orchid Chase and Melling Chase. He won the 1965 Chase in November 2018 but failed to win again for eighteen months before gaining his biggest win in the 2020 Champion Chase. In December 2020 he won the Tingle Creek Chase for a second time. It was to be his final victory and he was retired in March 2022 after a further four starts.

== Background ==
Politologue is a grey horse bred in at the Haras du Mesnil in France by Henri and Antonia Devin. He initially raced in the ownership of Sophie Devin and was sent into training with Etienne Leemans. He was gelded before the start of his racing career.

He was sired by the Critérium de Saint-Cloud winner Poliglote, whose other progeny have included Solemia, Don Poli and So French (Grand Steeplechase de Paris). Politologue's dam Scarlet Row, showed high class form in steeplechases in France, winning at least six races and running second in the Prix Maurice Gillois. As a descendant of the broodmare Numen, she came from a family which had produced numerous major winners in Germany.

== Racing career ==
=== 2014/15 season ===
Politologue began his racing career in a hurdle over 3400 metres on very soft ground at Compiegne on 20 May 2015 and finished second, beaten one and three quarter lengths by the winner Ami Sol. On 22 June at Auteuil Hippodrome he started at odds of 5.6/1 and recorded his first success as he took the lead in the last 100 metres and won by one and a half lengths.

=== 2015/16 season ===
In September 2015 Politologue was acquired by John Hales and sent to England where he joined the stable of Paul Nicholls at Ditcheat in Somerset. On his first run for his new connections he contested a Novice Hurdle at Cheltenham Racecourse on 11 December in which he appeared to be going well before jinking to the right approaching the last flight and unseating his rider, Sam Twiston-Davies (who became his regular jockey). Later that month he was moved up in class for the Grade 1 Challow Novices' Hurdle at Newbury Racecourse and finished second to the odds-on favourite Barters Hill. In February Politologue was partnered by Twiston-Davies when he went off the 2/9 favourite for the Bathwick Tyres Novices' Hurdle at Exeter Racecourse. He took the lead at the third hurdle and came home almost sixty lengths clear of his rivals after his only serious challenger, Ghost River, fell at the penultimate obstacle. On his first appearance at the Cheltenham Festival Politologue was matched against more experienced opponents in the Coral Cup and made little impact, coming home twentieth of the twenty-three finishers after tiring badly in the closing stages.

=== 2016/17 season ===
In the 2016/17 season Politologue was campaigned in Novice chases and made a successful debut over the larger obstacles when he came home ten lengths clear of his rivals at Haydock Park on 18 November. Four weeks later he started the 10/11 favourite for the Grade 2 Noel Novices' Chase at Ascot Racecourse and won again, leading from the start and winning by four lengths from Rock The Kasbah. After the race Paul Nicholls said "He is enthusiastic, he jumps, he has plenty of pace... I am really focussing on next season. He will be awesome then and we are just going to mind him for that."

In the Altcar Novices' Chase at Haydock in January Politologue started favourite but was beaten into second place by Waiting Patiently after being overtaken approaching the final fence. For his remaining starts that season he was equipped with a hood. Three weeks after his defeat at Haydock he was dropped in class for a minor event at Kempton Park Racecourse and won easily from his only opponent, Pain Au Chocolat, at odds of 1/8. In March the gelding ran for the second time in the Cheltenham Festival and finished fourth to Yorkhill in the Golden Miller Novices' Chase, beaten ten lengths by the winner. On his final start of the year the gelding contested the Maghull Novices' Chase at Aintree Racecourse in which he fell at the last fence when disputing the lead. The race was won by his stablemate San Benedeto.

=== 2017/18 season ===
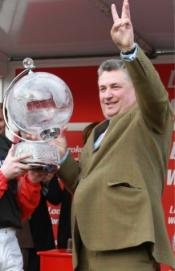
Politologue's trainer, Paul Nicholls

Politologue began his next campaign in the Haldon Gold Cup at Exeter on 7 November and went off the 5/2 favourite in an eight-runner field. After tracking the leaders in the early stages he went to the front four fences from the finish and was "always in command" thereafter, winning by two and a quarter lengths from San Benedeto. Nicholls commented "I thought he might just need it a fraction on that ground. That was a good performance as he can only improve. Sam said he jumped brilliantly and travelled so well."

On 9 December the gelding was stepped back up to Grade 1 class for the Tingle Creek Chase at Sandown Park in which he was ridden by Harry Cobden and started the 5/2 second favourite behind the Melling Chase winner Fox Norton. Although he appeared to be sweating badly before the start he took the lead at the second last and held off a sustained challenge from the favourite to win by half a length. After the race Nicholls said "The faster they go and the more he can get a tow into a race, the better. John [Hales] always wanted him to be a Gold Cup horse and we tried to make him a three-miler, but then we went to Aintree and that's why we're back at two miles... He reminds me a bit of Master Minded. I’m not saying he’s anywhere near as good yet but he jumps well and has a lot of class and at six, he's going to get better."

At the end of December Twiston-Davies resumed his partnership with Politologue when the gelding started 8/15 favourite for the Grade 2 Desert Orchid Chase at Kempton. He was left with a clear lead when his principal rival Special Tiara fell at the eighth fence, and steadily increased his advantage over the last three fences to win by thirteen lengths from Vaniteux. Twiston-Davies said "This fella has been brilliant. He's jumped and travelled. He's not the best in front but at the same time he's got the job done and he's very good in these conditions."

At Newbury on 10 February Politologue was matched against the undefeated Altior in the Game Spirit Chase and sustained a defeat for the time that season as he finished second, beaten four lengths by his rival after leading until the last fence. On his third appearance at the Cheltenham Festival he started at odds of 12/1 for the Champion Chase and finished fourth behind Altior, Min and God's Own after fading badly in the closing stages. At Aintree on 13 April he was moved up to two and a half miles for the Melling Chase and went off the 11/1 fourth choice behind Min, Balko de Flos (Ryanair Chase) and Cloudy Dream in a six-runner field. Racing in a hood for the first time in a year he was in contention from the start, and got the better of a sustained struggle with Min from the second last to win by a neck. After the race Twiston-Davies said "It was a good shout by Paul to put the hood back on, it helped him relax and he got in a great rhythm. Paul has done all the hard work and I just pushed at the end. When Min came up all I was hoping was that I winged the last to have a chance again, when something is travelling like that you are always concerned but one thing with him is that he tries very hard."

=== 2018/19 season ===
At Ascot on 24 November Politologue began his next season by starting the 5/4 favourite for the 1965 Chase in which, as a Grade 1 winner, he carried top weight of 161 pounds. Racing over a distance of two miles, five furlongs on good to soft ground he gained the advantage at the third last fence and was "driven out" by Twiston-Davies to win by half a length from Charbel. Nicholls, who was winning the race for the sixth time, said "He just frightens you to death because he travelled so well and the minute he hits the front he idles. It's his first run of the season, but he didn't want for fitness because he was ready... All the way through that race he showed so much pace. You just have to question whether his forte is going to be stamina or whether he's got plenty of speed. He's confusing me because he does travel and jump so well in his races."

On 26 December Politologue was stepped up in distance again for the King George VI Chase over three miles at Kempton in which he started at odds of 5/1 but never looked likely to win and came home fourth behind Clan des Obeaux, Thistlecrack and Native River. In the Ascot Chase in February he fared no better as he finished fourth of the six runners behind Cyrname, beaten more than twenty lengths by the winner. At the Cheltenham Festival Politologue was dropped back to two miles to contest his second Champion Chase and started at odds of 11/1 in a nine-runner field. With Cobden in the saddle he tracked the leaders before mounting a sustained challenge in the closing stages and finished second, just under two lengths behind the odds-on favourite Altior. At Aintree in April he attempted to repeat his 2018 success in the Melling Chase but proved no match for his old rival Min and was beaten twenty lengths into second place. After the race he was found to be bleeding from the nose.

In July 2019, Politologue underwent "wind surgery" to correct a breathing problem.

=== 2019/20 season ===
On 17 November 2019, Politologue returned to the track for the Grade 2 Shloer Chase in which he led for most of the way before being overtaken on the run-in and beaten into second place by the six-year-old favourite Defi du Seuil. In December he attempted to win the Tingle Creek Chase for the second time but was never in serious contention and came home fifth of the eight finishers behind Defi du Seuil, beaten eighteen lengths by the winner.

Politologue was without a hood when he ran for the third time in the Champion Chase on soft ground on 11 March in which he was ridden by Harry Skelton as Harry Cobden had opted to ride his stablemate, the Henry VIII Novices' Chase winner Dynamite Dollars. He started the 6/1 second favourite behind Defi du Seuil in a five-runner field which also included Sceau Royal (2017 Henry VIII Novices' Chase) and Bun Doran (Desert Orchid Chase). Altior had been withdrawn on the eve of the race after going lame. Poliologue took the lead from the start, opened up a clear advantage two fences from the finish and never looked in any danger of defeat, coming home nine and a half lengths clear of Dynamite Dollars. "I wanted to do everything I could to have him fit and fresh and all week and he's just been looking amazing. He had a great prep... He looked outstanding in the parade ring beforehand and I have been getting more bullish about him. It's his fifth Festival in a row and testament to the horse... Politologue was always going to have a nice lead in front and today was his day. You've got to believe in your own horses."

=== 2020/21 season ===
Politologue began the 2020/21 season in the Tingle Creek at Sandown on 5 December and started 11/8 favourite as he attempted to repeat his 2017 victory in the race. His four opponents were his stablemate Greaneteen (winner of the Haldon Gold Cup), Rouge Vif (Kingmaker Novices' Chase), Castlegrace Paddy (Fortria Chase) and Brewin'upastorm. The grey led form the start and drew away from his rivals on the run-in to win by seven lengths. Nicholls commented "He's in the form of his life... He's a true, staying two-miler, goes a gallop and keeps jumping, that's what he is."

On his next appearance Politologue started favourite for the Grade 1 Clarence House Chase at Ascot in January, but after leading in the early stages he was overtaken at half way and beaten seven lengths into second place by the outsider First Flow. Nicholls' assistant trainer Harry Derham said "It was a proper race and there were no excuses... Politologue is a wonderfully honest horse and always tries his best and always stays on really well, but he wasn't quite good enough on the day." Politologue then came fourth in the Melling Chase, beaten 25 lengths by favourite Fakir D'Oudairies. After the race he was found to have bled from the nose.

=== 2021/22 season and retirement ===
Politologue appeared twice on the racecourse in what was to be his final season. In November 2021 he came second in the Shloer Chase at Cheltenham, beaten six lengths by Nube Negra. On his final racecourse appearance he was beaten 25 length into fourth place by Energumene in the Champion Chase at the Cheltenham Festival, having started as the outsider of seven runners at odds of 80/1. Soon after the race, Nicholls announced the eleven-year-old's retirement: "I'm delighted with that and he's run really well. He hasn’t quite got the legs of the others now when coming down the hill, but he enjoyed it as I knew it would. He's been a brilliant servant for us – he's won over a million quid and won the Champion Chase so we’re really proud of him." Politologue joined Big Buck's on a farm in Dorset and took up hunting following his retirement.

== Pedigree ==
Pedigree of Politologue (IRE), grey gelding, 2011
Sire Poliglote (GB) 1992	Sadler's Wells (USA); 1981	Northern Dancer (CAN)	Nearctic
Sire Poliglote (GB) 1992	Sadler's Wells (USA); 1981	Northern Dancer (CAN)	Natalma (USA)
Sire Poliglote (GB) 1992	Sadler's Wells (USA); 1981	Fairy Bridge	Bold Reason
Sire Poliglote (GB) 1992	Sadler's Wells (USA); 1981	Fairy Bridge	Special
Sire Poliglote (GB) 1992	Alexandrie (USA); 1980	Val de l'Orne (FR)	Val de Loir
Sire Poliglote (GB) 1992	Alexandrie (USA); 1980	Val de l'Orne (FR)	Aglae
Sire Poliglote (GB) 1992	Alexandrie (USA); 1980	Apache (FR)	Sir Gaylord (USA)
Sire Poliglote (GB) 1992	Alexandrie (USA); 1980	Apache (FR)	Americaine
Dam Scarlet Row (FR) 2002	Turgeon (USA); 1986	Caro (IRE)	Fortino (FR)
Dam Scarlet Row (FR) 2002	Turgeon (USA); 1986	Caro (IRE)	Chambord (GB)
Dam Scarlet Row (FR) 2002	Turgeon (USA); 1986	Reiko (FR)	Targowice (USA)
Dam Scarlet Row (FR) 2002	Turgeon (USA); 1986	Reiko (FR)	Beronaire
Dam Scarlet Row (FR) 2002	Nile Glorieuse (FR); 1992	Le Glorieux (GB)	Cure The Blues (USA)
Dam Scarlet Row (FR) 2002	Nile Glorieuse (FR); 1992	Le Glorieux (GB)	La Mirande (FR)
Dam Scarlet Row (FR) 2002	Nile Glorieuse (FR); 1992	Nile Palace	Crystal Palace
Dam Scarlet Row (FR) 2002	Nile Glorieuse (FR); 1992	Nile Palace	Neomenie (IRE) (Family: 1-w)
