= Haldon Gold Cup =

Steeplechase horse race in Britain

Haldon Gold Cup Chase
2026
Rubaud	JPR One	Mirabad

Previous years
2025
Thistle Ask	Saint Segal	JPR One
2024
JPR One	Djelo	Sans Bruit
2023
Elixir De Nutz	Solo	War Lord
2022
Greaneteen	Dolos	War Lord
2021
Eldorado Allen	Hitman	Zanza

2020-2011
2020
Greaneteen	Moonlighter	Pink Eyed Pedro
2019
Janika	Dolos	Destrier
2018
God's Own	Ozzie The Oscar	San Benedeto
2017
Politologue	San Benedeto	Gino Trail
2016
Sir Valentino	Garde La Victoire	Dodging Bullets
2015
Vibrato Valtat	Third Intention	God's Own
2014
God's Own	Balder Succes	Oscar Hill
2013
Somersby	Module	Cue Card
2012
Cue Card	Edgardo Sol	Menorah
2011
Medermit	Cornas	Oiseau de Nuit

2010-2001
2010
Tchico Polos	Twist Magic	Somersby
2009
Planet of Sound	Cornas	Twist Magic
2008
Ashley Brook	Mahogany Blaze	Natal
2007
Pablo Du Charmil	Royal Shakespeare	Fair Along
2006
Impek	Ground Ball	Hoo La Baloo
2005
Monkerhostin	Kauto Star	Ashley Brook
2004
Azertyuiop	Seebald	Kadarann
2003
Edredon Bleu	Wahiba Sands	Kadarann
2002
Edredon Bleu	Seebald	Armaturk
2001
Best Mate	Desert Mountain	Fadalko

2000-1991
2000
Bellator	Upgrade	Call Equiname
1999
Flagship Uberalles	Direct Route	Space Trucker
1998
Lake Kariba	Direct Route	Or Royal
1997
Viking Flagship	Mulligan	Gales Cavalier
1996
Absalom's Lady	Coulton	Pimberley Place
1995
Travado	What's in Orbit	Medinas Swan Song
1994
Travado	Absalom's Lady	Deep Sensation
1993
Travado	Deep Sensation	Al Hashimi
1992
Waterloo Boy	Katabatic	Golden Freeze
1991
Sabin Du Loir	Waterloo Boy	Beech Road

1990-1988
1990
Sabin Du Loir	Desert Orchid	Setter Country
1989
Panto Prince	Seagram	Corn Merchant
1988
Barnbrook Again	Panto Prince	Western Sunset
1987
Very Promising	Pearlyman	Western Sunset

The Haldon Gold Cup, a limited handicap, is a Grade 2 National Hunt steeplechase in Great Britain which is open to horses aged four years or older. It is run at Exeter over a distance of about 2 miles and 1½ furlongs (2 miles, 1 furlong and 109 yards, or 3,520 metres), with twelve fences. The race is scheduled to take place each year in late October or early November. The 2024 race, on 8 November, was worth £59,440 to the winner.

The event is named after Haldon, a ridge of high ground in Devon on which Exeter Racecourse is located. The race became a limited handicap in 1996.

The 2005 edition was marred by the death of Best Mate, a three-time winner of the Cheltenham Gold Cup.

The 2026 edition took place at Aintree, after Exeter failed a track inspection due to firm ground. This is because of severe drought conditions in south west England.

== Records ==
Most successful horse (3 wins):

- Travado – 1993,1994,1995

Leading jockey (4 wins):

- Peter Scudamore – Artifice (1983), Admiral's Cup (1986), Sabin du Loir (1990,1991)
- Richard Johnson - Viking Flagship (1997), Monkerhostin (2005), Ashley Brook (2008), Planet of Sound (2009)

Leading trainer (9 wins):

- Paul Nicholls – Lake Kariba (1998), Flagship Uberalles (1999), Azertyuiop (2004), Tchico Polos (2010), Vibrato Valtat (2015), Politologue (2017), Greaneteen (2020,2022) , Rubaud (2026)

== Winners since 1969 ==
- Weights given in stones and pounds.

Year	Winner	Age	Weight	Jockey	Trainer
1969	Moonduster	10	12-07	Terry Biddlecombe	Fred Rimell
1970	Abandoned due to fog
1971	Bangkok	9	11-05	Bill Smith	Les Kennard
1972	Bangkok	10	11-12	Mr R Smith	Les Kennard
1973	Abandoned due to waterlogging
1974	Polymic	8	10-10	Anthony Andrews	J Cobden
1975	Sandwilan	7	11-04	Ron Hyett	S Wright
1976	Master H	7	11-08	Philip Blacker	Michael Oliver
1977	Transformation	8	10-08	Clive Candy	Jim Old
1978	Abandoned due to dangerously hard ground
1979	Hutton Lad	8	10-06	Lorna Vincent	Les Kennard
1980	Foreign Legion	9	11-09	G McNally	C James
1981	Silversmith	8	11-01	Steve Smith Eccles	Les Kennard
1982	News King	8	12-00	John Francome	Fred Winter
1983	Artifice	12	11-10	Peter Scudamore	John Thorne
1984	Fifty Dollars More	9	11-10	Richard Linley	Fred Winter
1985	Kathies Lad	8	11-08	Steve Smith-Eccles	Alan Jarvis
1986	Admiral's Cup	8	11-08	Peter Scudamore	Fred Winter
1987	Very Promising	9	11-00	Richard Dunwoody	David Nicholson
1988	Barnbrook Again	7	11-00	Simon Sherwood	David Elsworth
1989	Panto Prince	8	11-00	Brendan Powell	Chris Popham
1990	Sabin du Loir	11	11-00	Peter Scudamore	Martin Pipe
1991	Sabin du Loir	12	11-06	Peter Scudamore	Martin Pipe
1992	Waterloo Boy	9	11-06	Richard Dunwoody	David Nicholson
1993	Travado	7	11-00	Jamie Osborne	Nicky Henderson
1994	Travado	8	11-06	Jamie Osborne	Nicky Henderson
1995	Travado	9	11-06	Jamie Osborne	Nicky Henderson
1996	Absalom's Lady	8	10-07	David Bridgwater	Gay Kelleway
1997	Viking Flagship	10	11-10	Richard Johnson	David Nicholson
1998	Lake Kariba	7	10-06	Joe Tizzard	Paul Nicholls
1999	Flagship Uberalles	5	10–13	Joe Tizzard	Paul Nicholls
2000	Bellator	7	10-09	Norman Williamson	Venetia Williams
2001	Best Mate	6	10–12	Jim Culloty	Henrietta Knight
2002	Edredon Bleu	10	11-10	Jim Culloty	Henrietta Knight
2003	Edredon Bleu	11	11-10	Jim Culloty	Henrietta Knight
2004	Azertyuiop	7	11-10	Ruby Walsh	Paul Nicholls
2005	Monkerhostin	8	10-05	Richard Johnson	Philip Hobbs
2006	Impek	10	11-10	Tony McCoy	Henrietta Knight
2007	Pablo du Charmil	6	10–12	Tom Scudamore	David Pipe
2008	Ashley Brook	10	10-04	Richard Johnson	Kevin Bishop
2009	Planet of Sound	7	10-09	Richard Johnson	Philip Hobbs
2010	Tchico Polos	6	10-04	Ruby Walsh	Paul Nicholls
2011	Medermit	7	11-04	Robert Thornton	Alan King
2012	Cue Card	6	11-07	Joe Tizzard	Colin Tizzard
2013	Somersby	9	10-07	Dominic Elsworth	Mick Channon
2014	God's Own	6	10-07	Paddy Brennan	Tom George
2015	Vibrato Valtat	6	11-01	Sam Twiston-Davies	Paul Nicholls
2016	Sir Valentino	7	10-08	Adrian Heskin	Tom George
2017	Politologue	6	11-02	Sam Twiston-Davies	Paul Nicholls
2018	God's Own	10	11-09	Paddy Brennan	Tom George
2019	Janika	6	11-10	Daryl Jacob	Nicky Henderson
2020	Greaneteen	6	11-03	Harry Cobden	Paul Nicholls
2021	Eldorado Allen	7	10-07	Brendan Powell	Colin Tizzard
2022	Greaneteen	8	11-12	Harry Cobden	Paul Nicholls
2023	Elixir De Nutz	9	10-00	Freddie Gingell	Joe Tizzard
2024	JPR One	7	11-12	Brendan Powell	Joe Tizzard
2025	Thistle Ask	8	10-06	Harry Skelton	Dan Skelton
2026	Rubaud	8	10-09	Sam Twiston-Davies	Paul Nicholls

== See also ==
- Horse racing in Great Britain
- List of British National Hunt races
