= Kingmaker Novices' Chase =

Steeplechase horse race in Britain

Kingmaker Novices' Chase
2026
Steel Ally	Mirabad	Mambonumberfive

Previous years
2025
L'eau Du Sud	Rubaud	Tedley
2023
Jonbon	Calico	Only two ran
2022
Edwardstone	Third Time Lucki	Brave Seasca
2021
Allmankind	Sky Pirate	Cheddleton

2020-2011
2020
Rouge Vif	Nube Negra	Precious Cargo
2019
Glen Forsa	Kalashnikov	Dell Oro
2018
Saint Calvados	Diego Du Charmil	North Hill Harvey
2017
Flying Angel	Gino Trail	Two Taffs
2016
Violet Dancer	L'Ami Serge	Fox Norton
2015
Vibrato Valtat	Top Gamble	Turn Over Sivola
2014
Balder Succes	Brick Red	Valco De Touzaine
2013
Majala	His Excellency	Marshal Zhukov
2011
Finian's Rainbow	Stagecoach Pearl	Tail Of The Bank

2010-2001
2010
Long Run	Joe Jo Star	King Edmund
2009
Gauvain	Cornas	Free World
2008
Kruguyrova	Ring The Boss	Big Buck's
2007
Ursis	Opera Mundi	Desert Air
2006
Voy Por Ustedes	Hoo La Baloo	Dictum
2005
Kadount	Roofing Spirit	Locksmith
2002
Armaturk	Imaginaire	Hit And Run
2001
Whitenzo	Rodock	Simply Gifted

2000-1991
2000
Cenkos	Fadalko	Hidebound
1999
Flagship Uberalles	Tresor De Mai	Only two ran
1998
Lake Kariba	Queen Of Spades	Gale Toi
1997
Mulligan	Squire Silk	Flying Instructor
1996
Arctic Kinsman	Gambolling Doc	Air Shot
1994
Boscean Chieftain	Martomick	Raba Riba
1993
Flash The Cash	Billy Bathgate	Egypt Mill Prince
1992
Milford Quay	Beech Road	Flight Hill
1991
Anti Matter	Mulloch Brae	Sea Island

The Kingmaker Novices' Chase is a Grade 2 National Hunt steeplechase in Great Britain which is open to horses aged five years or older. It is run at Warwick over a distance of about 1 miles 7½ (1 mile 7 furlongs and 119 yards, or 3,126 metres), and during its running there are twelve fences to be jumped. The race is for novice chasers, and it is scheduled to take place each year in February.

The event was established in 1991, and it was originally contested in May over a distance of 2 miles and 4½ furlongs (4,124 metres). It was switched to February in 1996, and at the same time its length was cut to 2 miles. This was extended by 110 yards in 2000. The race was abandoned at Warwick in 2005, 2006 and 2007, and it was transferred on each occasion to Wincanton. At this venue it was run over 2 miles, and there were thirteen fences to jump. This distance was kept when it returned to Warwick in 2008.

The title of the race refers to the 16th Earl of Warwick, who was known as the "Kingmaker" during the Wars of the Roses.

== Records ==
Leading jockey (3 wins):

- Robert Thornton – Flagship Uberalles (1999), Kadount (2005), Voy Por Ustedes (2006)

Leading trainer (5 wins):

- Paul Nicholls - Lake Kariba (1998), Flagship Uberalles (1999), Whitenzo (2001), Armaturk (2002), Vibrato Valtat (2015)

== Winners ==
Year	Winner	Age	Jockey	Trainer
1991	Anti Matter	6	Peter Scudamore	Martin Pipe
1992	Milford Quay	9	Peter Scudamore	Martin Pipe
1993	Flashthecash	7	Adrian Maguire	Toby Balding
1994	Boscean Chieftain	10	Richard Dunwoody	Jackie Retter
	no race 1995
1996	Arctic Kinsman	8	Carl Llewellyn	Nigel Twiston-Davies
1997	Mulligan	7	Adrian Maguire	David Nicholson
1998	Lake Kariba	7	Richard Johnson	Paul Nicholls
1999	Flagship Uberalles	5	Robert Thornton	Paul Nicholls
2000	Cenkos	6	Jimmy McCarthy	Oliver Sherwood
2001	Whitenzo	5	Joe Tizzard	Paul Nicholls
2002	Armaturk	5	Timmy Murphy	Paul Nicholls
2003	Abandoned due to frost
2004	Abandoned due to frost
2005 (Note: The 2005, 2006 and 2007 runnings took place at Wincanton)	Kadount	7	Robert Thornton	Alan King
2006	Voy Por Ustedes	5	Robert Thornton	Alan King
2007	Ursis	6	Dominic Elsworth	Steve Gollings
2008	Kruguyrova	5	Jimmy McCarthy	Charles Egerton
2009 (Note: The 2009 edition was run at Sandown Park)	Gauvain	7	Noel Fehily	Charlie Mann
2010	Long Run	5	Sam Waley-Cohen (Note: amateur jockey)	Nicky Henderson
2011	Finian's Rainbow	8	Andrew Tinkler	Nicky Henderson
2012	Abandoned due to frost
2013	Majala	7	Jason Maguire	Tom George
2014	Balder Succes	6	Wayne Hutchinson	Alan King
2015	Vibrato Valtat	6	Sam Twiston-Davies	Paul Nicholls
2016	Violet Dancer	6	Jamie Moore	Gary Moore
2017	Flying Angel	6	Willy Twiston-Davies	Nigel Twiston-Davies
2018	Saint Calvados	5	Aidan Coleman	Harry Whittington
2019 (Note: The 2019 race took place at Sandown Park after the original Warwick fixture was cancelled because of an equine influenza outbreak)	Glen Forsa	7	Jonathan Burke	Mick Channon
2020	Rouge Vif	6	Gavin Sheehan	Harry Whittington
2021	Allmankind	5	Harry Skelton	Dan Skelton
2022	Edwardstone	8	Tom Cannon	Alan King
2023	Jonbon	7	Aidan Coleman	Nicky Henderson
2024	Abandoned due to waterlogging
2025	L'Eau du Sud	7	Harry Skelton	Dan Skelton
2026	Steel Ally	8	Dylan Johnston	Sam Thomas

== See also ==
- Horse racing in Great Britain
- List of British National Hunt races
