= Castleford Chase =

Steeplechase horse race in Britain

Castleford Chase
2025
Traprain Law	Doyen Du Bar	Harper's Brook

Previous years
2024
Harper's Brook	Parisencore	Pay The Piper
2022
Malystic	Cheddleton	Eclair D'Ainay
2021
Eclair D'Ainay	Cheddleton	Nuts Well

2020-2011
2020
First Flow	Eragone	The King Of May
2019
Marracudja	Hawk High	Eamon An Cnoic
2018
Cracking Find	Marracudja	Forest Bihan
2017
Just Cameron	Duke Of Navan	Cyrus Darius
2014
Upsilon Bleu	French Opera	De Boitron
2013
Pepite Rose	King of the Wolds	His Excellency
2012
Drumshambo	Lease Lend	Dontpaytheferryman
2011
Charingworth	Pret A Thou	Stagecoach Pearl

2010-2001
2008
Santa's Son	Moon Over Miami	Locksmith
2007
Calatagan	Almaydan	Kilmackilloge
2006
Calatagan	Coat of Honour	Bambi De L'orme
2005
Mister McGoldrick	Albuhera	Oneway
2003
Kadarann	Flagship Uberalles	Pharbeitfrome
2002
Geos	Armaturk	Davoski
2001
Turgeonev	Minster Glory	Jungli

2000-1991
2000
Function Dream	Davoski	Celibate
1999
Nordance Prince	Aghawadda Gold	Celibate
1998
Cumbrian Challenge	Direct Route	Flying Instructor
1997
Viking Flagship	Lord Dorcet	Down The Fell
1994
Viking Flagship	Snitton Lane	Sybillin
1992
Katabatic	Waterloo Boy	Boro Smackeroo
1991
Waterloo Boy	Last 'O' The Bunch	Cashew King

1990-1987
1990
Waterloo Boy	Young Snugfit	Antinous
1989
Ida's Delight	Nohalmdun	Pearlyman
1988
Midnight Count	Somerled	Jim Thorpe
1987
Pearlyman	Little Bay	Sea Merchant

The Castleford Chase is a National Hunt handicap steeplechase in England which is open to horses aged four years or older. It is run over a distance of about one mile and seven furlongs (1m 7f 36y, or 3,050 metres) at Wetherby Racecourse on 27th December. There are thirteen fences to be jumped in the race.

The Castleford Chase's recent history has seen a number of changes in conditions and status. Until 1989 it was run as a limited handicap. In 1990 it was upgraded to a Grade 1 race and run as a conditions chase for the first time. From 1998 it reverted to a limited handicap and was downgraded to Grade 2 status. In 2006 it was replaced as a Grade 2 chase in the calendar by Kempton Park's newly inaugurated Desert Orchid Chase and became a handicap chase for horses rated between 0 and 145.

== Winners since 1975 ==
Year	Winner	Age	Weight	Jockey	Trainer
1975	Tingle Creek	9	12-00	Ian Watkinson	Harry Thomson Jones
1976	Skryne	6	11-07	Ron Barry	Peter Bailey
1977	Crofton Hall	8	11-00	Jonjo O'Neill	J Dixon
1978	Lord Greystoke	7	10–11	Ron Barry	Gordon W. Richards
1979	Rathgorman	7	11-02	Ken Whyte	Tony Dickinson
1980	Rathgorman	8	11-10	Ken Whyte	Michael Dickinson
1981	Abandoned because of snow and frost
1982	Little Bay	7	10-08	Ron Barry	Gordon W. Richards
1983	Badsworth Boy	8	12-00	Graham Bradley	Michael Dickinson
1984	Ryeman	7	11-10	Graham Bradley	Monica Dickinson
1985	Our Fun	8	10–11	Richard Rowe	Josh Gifford
1986	Little Bay	11	11-07	Phil Tuck	Gordon W. Richards
1987	Pearlyman	8	12-07	Tom Morgan	John Edwards
1988	Midnight Count	8	12-02	Peter Hobbs	Josh Gifford
1989	Ida's Delight	10	10-07	Brian Storey	Alastair Charlton
1990	Waterloo Boy	7	11-10	Richard Dunwoody	David Nicholson
1991	Waterloo Boy	8	11-10	Richard Dunwoody	David Nicholson
1992	Katabatic	9	11-10	Simon McNeill	Andy Turnell
1993	Abandoned because of snow
1994	Viking Flagship	7	11-10	Adrian Maguire	David Nicholson
1995	Abandoned because of frost
1996	Abandoned because of frost
1997	Viking Flagship	10	11-10	Richard Johnson	David Nicholson
1998	Cumbrian Challenge	9	12-06	Richie McGrath	Tim Easterby
1999	Nordance Prince	8	10-06	Tony Dobbin	Venetia Williams
2000	Function Dream	8	10-00	Anthony Ross	Mary Reveley
2001	Turgeonev	6	13-00	Tony Dobbin	Tim Easterby
2002	Geos	7	10–12	John Kavanagh	Nicky Henderson
2003	Kadarann	6	11-08	Joe Tizzard	Paul Nicholls
2004 (Note: The "2004" running took place in January 2005 after the original fixture was abandoned because of frost)	Mister McGoldrick	8	11-02	Dominic Elsworth	Sue Smith
2005	Mister McGoldrick	8	11-08	Dominic Elsworth	Sue Smith
2006	Calatagan	7	11-11	Tom Dreaper	Malcolm Jefferson
2007	Calatagan	8	11-02	Tom Dreaper	Malcolm Jefferson
2008	Santa's Son	8	11-06	Peter Buchanan	Howard Johnson
2009	Abandoned due to snow
2010	Abandoned due to frost
2011	Charingworth	8	10-00	Lucy Alexander	Ferdy Murphy
2012	Drumshambo	6	11–12	Aidan Coleman	Venetia Williams
2013	Pepite Rose	6	11-02	Liam Treadwell	Venetia Williams
2014	Upsilon Bleu	6	11-06	James Reveley	Pauline Robson
2015	Abandoned due to flooding
2016	Yorkist	8	10-04	Harry Skelton	Dan Skelton
2017	Just Cameron	10	11-12	Joe Colliver	Micky Hammond
2018	Cracking Find	7	10-03	Sean Quinlan	Sue Smith
2019	Marracudja	8	11-01	Bridget Andrews	Dan Skelton
2020	First Flow	8	11-07	David Bass	Kim Bailey
2021	Eclair D'Ainay	7	10-02	Harry Skelton	Dan Skelton
2022	Malystic	8	11-10	Danny McMenamin	Peter Niven
2023	Abandoned due to waterlogging
2024	Harper's Brook	8	11-08	Kielan Woods	Dan Skelton
2025	Traprain Law	7	10-10	Patrick Wadge	Lucinda Russell & Michael Scudamore

== See also ==
- Horse racing in Great Britain
- List of British National Hunt races
