= Twist Magic =

French-bred Thoroughbred racehorse

- Sire: Winged Love
- Grandsire: In The Wings
- Dam: Twist Scarlett
- Damsire: Lagunas
- Sex: Gelding
- Foaled: 20 April 2002
- Country: Germany
- Colour: Bay or Brown
- Breeder: Dr. Georg Hastrich and Co.
- Owner: Barry Fulton, Tony Hayward & Michael Lynch
- Trainer: Paul Nicholls
- Record: 30: 10-3-5
- Earnings: £579,969

Major wins
- Maghull Novices' Chase (2007); Tingle Creek Chase (2007, 2009); Punchestown Champion Chase (2008); Celebration Chase (2009); Victor Chandler Chase (2010)

Twist Magic (20 April 2002 – 15 December 2010) was a French-bred, British-trained National Hunt horse trained by Paul Nicholls. He specialised as a two-mile chaser, and recorded many top class wins such as the Tingle Creek in 2007 and 2009 and the Victor Chandler Chase in 2010. He suffered a serious injury while racing in the rearranged Peterborough Chase at Newbury and was put down. He was a rather quirky character, although not at his best at Cheltenham, he was one of the best two-mile chasers of his generation.

== Background ==
Twist Magic was bred by Dr. Georg Hastrich and Co. and initially trained by Guillaume Macaire. He was sired by Irish Derby winner Winged Love a son of Coronation Cup and Breeders Cup Turf winner In The Wings. His dam Twist Scarlett was a daughter of Deutsches Derby winner Lagunas.

== Racing career ==
=== Early career ===
Twist Magic made his debut at Auteuil in France as a three-year-old. Racing in a hurdle race over two miles seven furlongs, he finished third to Sasso Lungo. He filled the same position in another hurdle race behind Golden Silver, before winning at the third attempt in June. He was then sold to Barry Fulton, Tony Hayward and Michael Lynch, and relocated to Paul Nicholls’ yard in Somerset, England.

=== 2005/2006 season: Novice hurdling ===
Twist Magic made his British debut in the Wensleydale Juvenile Novices’ Hurdle at Wetherby in October 2005. Sent off the 11/10 favourite, he was ridden by Paddy Brennan to finish sixth behind Aviation. He next ran in a similar event at Wincanton in December, and won by nine lengths from Pace Shot under Christian Williams. Stepped up in class to Grade 1 company in the Finale Juvenile Hurdle at Chepstow, Twist Magic finished fifth behind Blue Shark. He next finished a distant third to Kasbah Bliss in the Grade 2 Adonis Juvenile Novices’ Hurdle at Sandown in February. Twist Magic rather underperformed in his next start in the Grade 1 Anniversary 4yo Novices’ Hurdle at Aintree, pulling up two flights from the finish behind Detroit City.

=== 2006/2007 season: Novice chasing ===
After a summer break, Twist Magic was switched to fences for his debut race. Sent off at 9/4 and ridden by Ruby Walsh, he won a two-mile novices’ chase at Fakenham by twenty four lengths from Royal Shakespeare. He next ran in the Grade 2 Wayward Lad Novices’ Chase at Kempton, where he finished second by just over a length to Jack The Giant, trained by Nicky Henderson. With only two runs over fences under his belt, Twist Magic then ran in the Grade 1 Arkle Challenge Trophy at the Cheltenham Festival in March. Sent off at 12/1, he was staying on well when falling at the second last fence along with future Grand National winner Don't Push It. The Alan King trained My Way De Solzen won the race. Twist Magic gained compensation at Aintree when he won the Grade 1 Maghull Novices’ Chase by five lengths from Fair Along.

=== 2007/2008 Season: Chasing ===
Twist Magic reappeared in a graduation chase over two miles at Kempton in November, where he defeated Mister Quasimodo by six lengths under Ruby Walsh. He next took on the reigning Queen Mother Champion Chase winner Voy Por Ustedes in the Grade 1 Tingle Creek Chase at Sandown. Sent off at 5/1 and with Sam Thomas deputising for an injured Ruby Walsh, Twist Magic won by five lengths to establish himself as a top class two mile chaser. He then ran in the Grade 1 Victor Chandler Chase at Ascot on heavy ground. Although sent off the 4/5 favourite, he struggled behind a front running Tamarinbleu and was beaten twelve lengths into second.

Twist Magic's next race came in the Queen Mother Champion Chase at Cheltenham, where he was the 5/1 fourth favourite behind Voy Por Ustedes and stablemate Master Minded, who had won the Game Spirit Chase. Twist Magic was ridden by Sam Thomas after Ruby Walsh selected Master Minded, and was well beaten behind that horse after making a bad mistake three out.

Twist Magic gained compensation for the loss when winning the Grade 1 Punchestown Champion Chase in April, defeating his stablemate Natal by nearly two lengths.

=== 2008/2009 Season ===
Twist Magic made his seasonal debut under top weight of 11 st 10 lbs in the Haldon Gold Cup at Exeter. Appearing to need the run, he finished fourth behind Ashley House after weakening some way from the finish. He then reopposed stablemate Master Minded in the Tingle Creek Chase. He was going well and appeared to be the only challenge to the favourite when he misjudged the second last fence and fell. Twist Magic disappointed when sent off 13/8 favourite in the Grade 2 Desert Orchid Chase at Kempton, finishing sixth behind Fiepes Shuffle, who had also fallen in the Tingle Creek.

Despite failing at the track twice, Twist Magic again ran in the Champion Chase at Cheltenham, but was unruly in the parade and unseated Sam Thomas, then fell at the fourth last fence as Master Minded recorded his second win in the race. He then bounced back to form at Sandown in the Celebration Chase, which he won by ten lengths from Arkle second Kalahari King.

=== 2009/2010 Season ===
Twist Magic again made his debut in the Haldon Gold Cup, but put up a better performance than the previous year, running on in the final furlong to take third behind Planet Of Sound. With Master Minded injured, Twist Magic was Paul Nicholls’ main hope in the Tingle Creek, and was ridden by Ruby Walsh. In a change of tactics, he led the entire race and jumped extremely well, defeating 2009 Arkle winner Forpadydeplasterer by fifteen lengths, with former Arkle winner Well Chief in third and future Champion Chase winner Big Zeb fourth.

Seemingly revitalised by the new front running style, Twist Magic made amends for his defeat in the Victor Chandler Chase two years previously by winning the race by twelve lengths from Petit Robin. Although in much better form this season, Twist Magic was once again a failure in the Champion Chase, blundering four out and being pulled up by Robert Thornton as Biz Zeb triumphed. A trip to Ireland for the Punchestown Champion Chase ended in disaster when he refused to race at the start, leaving Golden Silver to win from Forpadydeplasterer. Twist Magic raced once more that season in the Celebration Chase, where he was third to 9/1 chance I’m So Lucky.

=== 2010/2011 Season ===
Twist Magic returned in the Haldon Gold Cup for the third year running, this time failing by half a length to concede 19 lbs to his stablemate Tchico Polos, who was ridden by Ruby Walsh. Plans to run in the Tingle Creek were scuppered when Sandown was lost to the weather and the race was transferred to Cheltenham, a track Twist Magic did not prefer. Instead he was rerouted to the Peterborough Chase, also rearranged due to frost and held this year at Newbury. Although initially reluctant to start, Twist Magic had taken the lead and was travelling powerfully when he fell at the second last fence and fractured a fetlock, resulting in him being put down. Jockey Sam Thomas escaped unharmed. Trainer Paul Nicholls paid tribute, calling him "such a wonderful horse" and the injury "a real tragedy".
