= Finian's Rainbow (horse) =

Irish-bred Thoroughbred racehorse

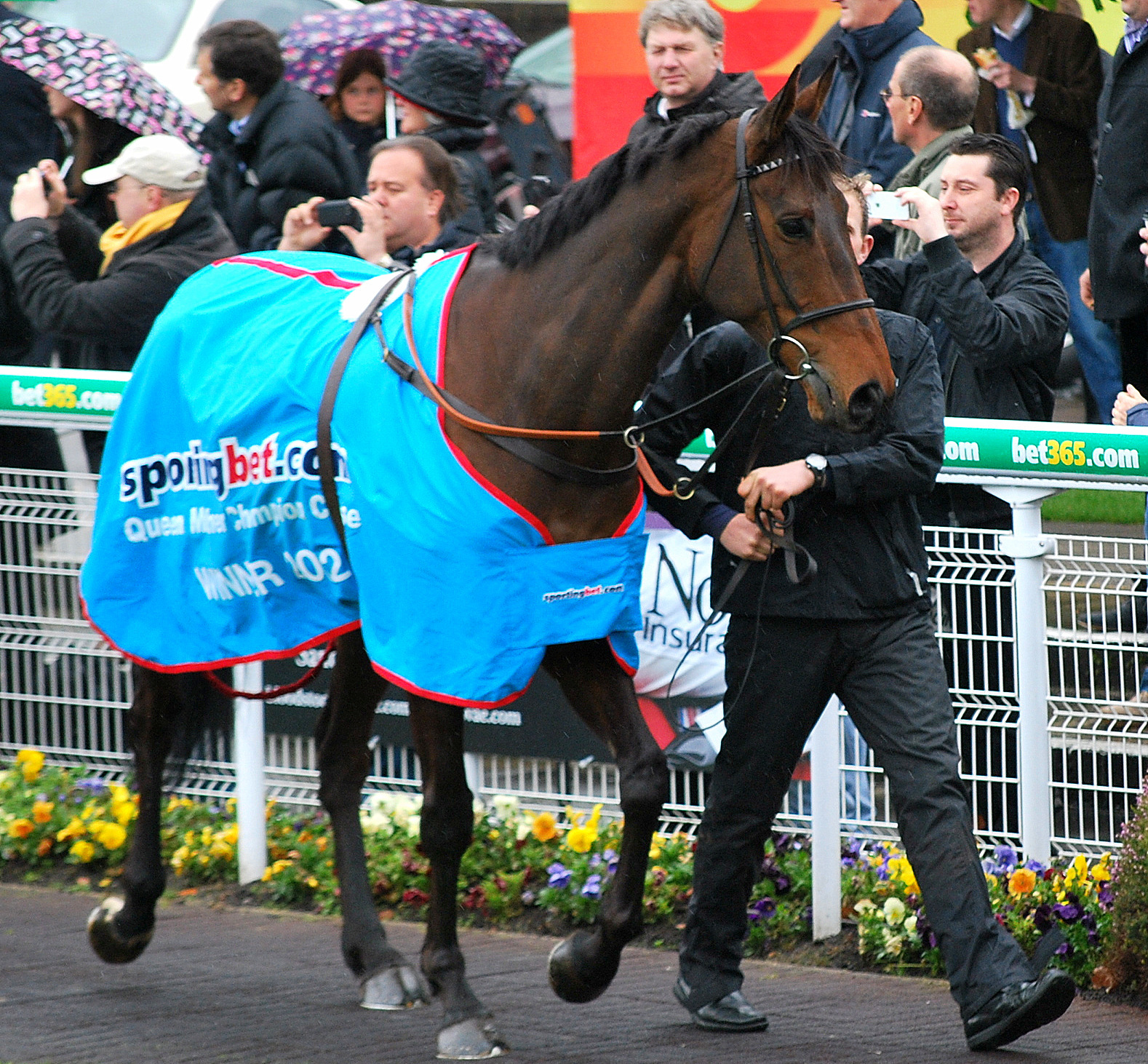
- Finian's Rainbow in the Champions Parade at Sandown on bet365 Gold Cup Day, 28 April 2012
- Sire: Tiraaz
- Grandsire: Lear Fan
- Dam: Trinity Gale
- Damsire: Strong Gale
- Sex: Gelding
- Foaled: 29 May 2003
- Died: 24 March 2021 (aged 17)
- Country: Ireland
- Colour: Bay
- Breeder: J. O'Keeffe
- Owner: Michael Buckley
- Trainer: Nicky Henderson
- Record: 15: 10-2-1
- Earnings: £464,144

Major wins
- Kingmaker Novices' Chase (2011); Maghull Novices' Chase (2011); Desert Orchid Chase (2011); Queen Mother Champion Chase (2012); Melling Chase (2012)

Awards
- Anglo-Irish Champion 2m Chaser (2011/12)

Finian's Rainbow (29 May 2003 – 24 March 2021) was a British Thoroughbred racehorse. He won ten of his fifteen starts, including the Maghull Novices' Chase, Queen Mother Champion Chase, and Melling Chase. He was owned by Michael Buckley, trained by Nicky Henderson, and was ridden by Barry Geraghty in all but one of his races.

== Background ==
Finian's Rainbow was foaled on 29 May 2003. A bay gelding, he was bred by J. O'Keeffe. He was sired by Tiraaz, who won the Prix Royal-Oak in 1998. Finian's Rainbow's dam was Trinity Gale, a daughter of top National Hunt sire Strong Gale, who was the leading jump racing sire in Great Britain and Ireland for six seasons. Trinity Gale raced in seven hurdle races in 1993 and 1994, without winning; she did however win a point-to-point race at Ballon Racecourse. Finian's Rainbow died on 24 March 2021 from complications due to colic.

== Racing career ==
=== 2008–09 season ===
In his first start under rules, Finian's Rainbow won a two-mile National Hunt flat race at Kempton Park, beating Stoney's Treasure by six lengths. This was his only start of the 2008–09 season.

=== 2009–10 season ===
At the start of the 2009–10 season he won his first race over hurdles in November, when he beat favourite Sereth by fifteen lengths in a Class 3 Novices' Hurdle race over two miles and half a furlong at Newbury. On his next start he finished third, one length behind winner Reve De Sivola, in the Grade 1 Challow Novices' Hurdle. After winning another Class 3 Novices Hurdle at Ascot, Finian's Rainbow went to the Cheltenham Festival, where he was one of seventeen horses to contest the Neptune Investment Management Novices' Hurdle. Rite of Passage, who had finished third in the previous season's Champion Bumper started as the 7/2 favourite, with Finian's Rainbow third favourite at 11/2. He was with the leaders when they jumped the second to last hurdle, but could not keep pace with them in the final stages. The race was won by Peddlers Cross by one and a half lengths from Reve De Sivola, with Rite of Passage a further three and three quarter lengths back in third. Finian's Rainbow finished in fifth place, six and three quarter lengths behind the winner.

=== 2010–11 season ===
Finian's Rainbow started the 2010–11 season in November 2010, when he won a Class 3 Novices' Chase at Newbury over two miles and one furlong, easily beating Hell's Bay by twelve lengths. The following January he won another Novices' Chase at Newbury, before starting as the 2/5 favourite for the Kingmaker Novices' Chase at Warwick. He won the race by eleven lengths from Stagecoach Pearl, after being eased up in the final stages by jockey Andrew Tinkler. Finian's Rainbow went to the Cheltenham Festival again, this time contesting the Arkle Challenge Trophy. With regular jockey Barry Geraghty back on board, he raced near the front of the ten-runner field throughout the race. He was leading until he hit the last fence, after which he was overtaken by Captain Chris and could not get back on terms. Captain Chris won the race by two and three quarter lengths from Finian's Rainbow, with Realt Dubh a further six lengths back in third and pre-race favourite Medermit in fourth place.

At Aintree on 9 April, Finian's Rainbow was one of seven horses to run in the Maghull Novices' Chase over two miles. He started as the odd-on favourite for the race. Also near the front of the betting were Ghizao, Starluck and Dan Breen. Finian's Rainbow led the race from the start. He was challenged by Ghizao with two fences left to jump, but beat him by two lengths. The two were over twenty lengths clear of Dan Breen, who finished in third place. This was Finian's Rainbow's first Grade 1 win and his final race of the season.

=== 2011–12 season ===
==== Early season ====
His first race out of novice company was the Desert Orchid Chase at Kempton Park in December 2011. He led in the early stages of the race, but was overtaken when he made a mistake jumping the fourth to last fence. He dropped about four lengths back, but ran on in the finishing straight and regained the lead in the final few yards, beating Wishful Thinking by three-quarters of a length. In the Victor Chandler Chase he was beaten by one and a quarter lengths by Somersby. Finian's Rainbow was nearly four lengths ahead of leading novice Al Ferof, who finished in third place.

==== Champion Chase ====
In the Queen Mother Champion Chase at the Cheltenham Festival, he faced a quality field that included the previous two winners Sizing Europe and Big Zeb. These were the first three in the betting, with Sizing Europe starting as the 4/5 favourite, Finian's Rainbow at 4/1, Big Zeb at 13/2. Wishful Thinking was leading until he fell at the fourth fence and went through the rail, injuring a photographer. Sizing Europe and Finian's Rainbow began to pull clear with two fences left to jump. However, the last fence was omitted as the photographer and Wishful Thinking's jockey Richard Johnson were injured. This appeared to cause some confusion as to whether the fence should be jumped, with the leading pair veering right to miss the fence and coming close to each other. Finian's Rainbow and Sizing Europe fought for the lead along the finishing straight, until Finian's Rainbow slowly pulled away in the final 100 yards. He beat Sizing Europe by one and a quarter lengths. Big Zeb was another fifteen lengths behind in third, and Gauvain a further eleven lengths down in fourth place. After the race Sizing Europe's jockey Andrew Lynch said to trainer Henry de Bromhead, "the last cost me the race". Finian's Rainbow's jockey Barry Geraghty said: "It's a brilliant day – you dream of days like this. I'm genuinely so delighted for Michael Buckley. He's had a good few disappointments this season, but he's had patience with this fellow and I really am delighted for him."

==== Melling Chase ====
In his final start of the season, Finian's Rainbow started as the 13/8 favourite for the two and a half mile Melling Chase, further than he had previously raced over fences. In the early stages he tracked leaders Albertas Run and Poquelin. He hit the tenth fence, but took the lead from Albertas Run two fences out. He then pulled clear to win by seven lengths from Wishfull Thinking, with Albertas Run finishing in third place. Trainer Nicky Henderson said after the race: "Today he was always in a comfortable position just behind and you hoped he was in cruise control and he probably was. When he [Geraghty] switched him on he picked it up very quickly." At the end of the season he had an official rating of 173, making him the Anglo-Irish Champion two-mile chaser for the season. He was the fourth highest rated chaser overall, behind Kauto Star, Long Run and Master Minded.

=== 2012–13 season ===
Finian's Rainbow made a disappointing start to the 2012–13 National Hunt season, when, in heavy ground, he finished last of the four runners and 24 lengths behind winner Captain Chris in the Amlin 1965 Chase. It was originally intended that he would run in the King George VI Chase on Boxing Day, but was withdrawn, with trainer Nicky Henderson saying he would not run due to the heavy ground.

== Pedigree ==
Pedigree of Finian's Rainbow, bay gelding, 2003
Sire Tiraaz (USA) b. 1994	Lear Fan (USA) b. 1981	Roberto b. 1969	Hail To Reason
Sire Tiraaz (USA) b. 1994	Lear Fan (USA) b. 1981	Roberto b. 1969	Bramalea
Sire Tiraaz (USA) b. 1994	Lear Fan (USA) b. 1981	Wac b. 1969	Lt. Stevens
Sire Tiraaz (USA) b. 1994	Lear Fan (USA) b. 1981	Wac b. 1969	Belthazar
Sire Tiraaz (USA) b. 1994	Tarikhana (IRE) gr. 1987	Mouktar gr. 1982	Nishapour
Sire Tiraaz (USA) b. 1994	Tarikhana (IRE) gr. 1987	Mouktar gr. 1982	Molitva
Sire Tiraaz (USA) b. 1994	Tarikhana (IRE) gr. 1987	Tremogia b. 1971	Silver Shark
Sire Tiraaz (USA) b. 1994	Tarikhana (IRE) gr. 1987	Tremogia b. 1971	Tonnera
Dam Trinity Gale (IRE) b. 1988	Stong Gale (IRE) br. 1975	Lord Gayle b. 1965	Sir Gaylord
Dam Trinity Gale (IRE) b. 1988	Stong Gale (IRE) br. 1975	Lord Gayle b. 1965	Sticky Case
Dam Trinity Gale (IRE) b. 1988	Stong Gale (IRE) br. 1975	Sterntau b. 1969	Tamerlane
Dam Trinity Gale (IRE) b. 1988	Stong Gale (IRE) br. 1975	Sterntau b. 1969	Sterna
Dam Trinity Gale (IRE) b. 1988	Trinity Air ch. 1977	Menelek b. 1957	Tulyar
Dam Trinity Gale (IRE) b. 1988	Trinity Air ch. 1977	Menelek b. 1957	Queen of Sheba
Dam Trinity Gale (IRE) b. 1988	Trinity Air ch. 1977	Beauair ch. 1964	Beau Sabreur
Dam Trinity Gale (IRE) b. 1988	Trinity Air ch. 1977	Beauair ch. 1964	Midair

Note: b. = Bay, br. = Brown, ch. = Chestnut, gr. = Grey
