= Flagship Uberalles =

Irish-bred Thoroughbred racehorse

- Sire: Accordion
- Dam: Fourth Degree
- Damsire: Oats
- Sex: Gelding
- Foaled: 1994
- Died: 2020
- Country: Ireland
- Colour: Bay
- Breeder: Miss E C Holdsworth
- Owner: JP McManus; E Gutner & M Krysztofiak; A P Brady
- Trainer: Dermot Weld; Patrick Flynn; Paul Nicholls; Noel Chance; Philip Hobbs
- Record: 40: 14-9-3
- Earnings: £1,383,464

Major wins
- Kingmaker Novices' Chase (1999); Arkle Challenge Trophy (1999); Maghull Novices' Chase (1999); Haldon Gold Cup (1999); Tingle Creek Chase (1999, 2000, 2001); Queen Mother Champion Chase (2002); Punchestown Champion Chase (2003)

Flagship Uberalles was a racehorse, a half brother to the 1994 and 1995 Queen Mother Champion Chase winner Viking Flagship, who raced between 1997 and 2005.

He started his racing career as a Flat horse in Ireland and was trained by Dermot Weld and made his race course debut in April 1997. He finished 5th on his 2 only starts for him, both in maiden flat races.

He then joined the yard of Patrick Flynn and was immediately sent hurdling, where he won his first 2 races before running creditably in Grade 1 company. He had one more start under the care of Flynn, before joining the yard of Paul Nicholls. He had 15 starts under Nicholls, where he reached the very top with victories in races such as the Arkle Challenge Trophy and Tingle Creek Chase among others. In his final start for Nicholls in April 2000, he was pulled up.

He then changed trainers again, and was sent to the yard Noel Chance, where he won the Tingle Creek Chase again on his first start for the trainer. He went on to have 3 more starts for Noel Chance, where he was unable to get his head in front again, before being sent to the yard of Philip Hobbs. On his first start under him in December 2001, he again won the Tingle Creek Chase. It was under the care of Philip Hobbs that he had the biggest success of his career as he won the race that had eluded him up till then, the Queen Mother Champion Chase. He had 14 starts under Hobbs in total and towards the end of his racing career, he was struggling, and ended his racing career in March 2005, finishing 18th in the Grand Annual Chase at the Cheltenham Festival.

Flagship Uberalles was retired at J P McManus's Martinston Stud in Ireland alongside Istabraq, Baracouda & First Gold until his death in 2020.

As well as having 5 different trainers, Flagship Uberalles also had 3 different owners, starting with A P Brady, then E Gutner & M Krysztofiak, before being bought by JP McManus.
