= Punchestown Champion Chase =

Steeplechase horse race in Ireland

- Class: Grade 1
- Location: Punchestown; County Kildare, Ireland
- Race type: Steeplechase
- Sponsor: William Hill
- Website: Punchestown

Race information
- Distance: 2 miles ½ furlong (3,219 metres)
- Surface: Turf
- Track: Right-handed
- Qualification: Five-years-old and up
- Weight: 11 st 12 lb Allowances; 7 lb for mares
- Purse: €300,000 (2024); 1st: €177,000

Boylesports.com Champion Chase
2026
Il Etait Temps	Marine Nationale	Energumene

Previous years
2025
Marine Nationale	Captain Guinness	Solness
2024
Banbridge	Captain Guinness	Dinoblue
2023
Energumene	Chacun Pour Soi	Blue Lord
2022
Energumene	Chacun Pour Soi	Envoi Allen
2021
Chacun Pour Soi	Allaho	Nube Negra

2020-2011
2019
Un De Sceaux	Min	Castlegrace Paddy
2018
Un De Sceaux	Douvan	A Toi Phil
2017
Fox Norton	Un De Sceaux	God's Own
2016
God's Own	Vautour	Simonsig
2015
Felix Yonger	Baily Green	Hidden Cyclone
2014
Sizing Europe	Ballynagour	Savello
2013
Sprinter Sacre	Sizing Europe	Days Hotel
2012
Sizing Europe	Realt Dubh	Big Zeb
2011
Big Zeb	Sizing Europe	Captain Cee Bee

2010-2003
2010
Golden Silver	Forpadydeplasterer	Sizing Europe
2009
Master Minded	Big Zeb	Conna Castle
2008
Twist Magic	Natal	Mansony
2007
Mansony	Justified	Steel Band
2006
Newmill	Fota Island	Central House
2005
Rathgar Beau	Moscow Flyer	Native Upmanship
2004
Moscow Flyer	Rathgar Beau	Strong Run
2003
Flagship Uberalles	Arctic Copper	Killultagh Storm

The Punchestown Champion Chase, currently known for sponsorship purposes as the William Hill Champion Chase, is a Grade 1 National Hunt steeplechase in Ireland which is open to horses aged five years or older. It is run at Punchestown over a distance of about 2 miles and half a furlong (3,219 metres) and during its running there are eleven fences to be jumped. The race is scheduled to take place each year during the Punchestown Festival in late April.

It was formerly a handicap race, and for much of the 1990s and early 2000s it was usually sponsored by BMW. It became a conditions race in 1999, and it was subsequently backed by Betdaq (2004) and Kerrygold (2005–09) and Boylesports (2010–19). The present sponsor, William Hill, began to support the event in 2021.

The field usually includes horses which ran previously in the Queen Mother Champion Chase, and the last to win both races in the same year was Il Etait Temps in 2026.

== Records ==
Most successful horse since 1950 (2 wins):

- Shower of Silver – 1955, 1956
- Muir – 1969, 1970
- Skymas – 1972, 1973
- Light the Wad – 1981, 1982
- Klairon Davis – 1996, 1997
- Sizing Europe - 2012, 2014
- Un de Sceaux - 2018, 2019
- Energumene- 2022, 2023

Leading jockey since 1950 (6 wins):

- Paul Townend - Golden Silver (2010), Un de Sceaux (2019), Chacun Pour Soi (2021), Energumene (2022,2023), Il Etait Temps (2026)

Leading trainer since 1950 (9 wins):

- Willie Mullins - Micko's Dream (2001), Golden Silver (2010), Felix Yonger (2015), Un de Sceaux (2018,2019), Chacun Pour Soi (2021), Energumene (2022,2023), Il Etait Temps (2026)

== Winners since 1980 ==
Year	Winner	Age	Jockey	Trainer
1980	Paddy Bouler	7	S. Lynch	Pat Rooney
1981	Light the Wad	8	Frank Leavy	Dessie Hughes
1982	Light the Wad	9	Tom Morgan	Dessie Hughes
1983	Turloughmore Lad	8	Pat Leech	Paddy Norris
1984	Travelowen	7	Tom Costello (Note: amateur rider)	Tom Costello
1985	Buck House	7	Tommy Carmody	Mouse Morris
1986	Another Brownie	7	Joe Byrne	M. J. McGrath
1987	Eddie Wee	11	Conor O'Dwyer	Billy Rock
1988	Flying Ferret	7	Brendan Powell	Tony Redmond
1989	Super Furrow	9	Padge Gill	Jerry O'Neill
1990	Rust Never Sleeps	6	Gerry O'Neill	Augustine Leahy
1991	Good for a Laugh	7	Charlie Swan	Arthur Moore
1992	The Musical Priest	10	Jason Titley	Michael Purcell
1993	Viking Flagship	6	Richard Dunwoody	David Nicholson
1994	Saraemma	8	Kevin O'Brien	Homer Scott
1995	Strong Platinum	7	Conor O'Dwyer	Paddy Burke
1996	Klairon Davis	7	Francis Woods	Arthur Moore
1997	Klairon Davis	8	Francis Woods	Arthur Moore
1998	Big Matt	10	Mick Fitzgerald	Nicky Henderson
1999	Celibate	8	Richard Dunwoody	Charlie Mann
2000	Get Real	9	Mick Fitzgerald	Nicky Henderson
2001	Micko's Dream (Note: The 2001 running took place at Fairyhouse)	9	Ruby Walsh	Willie Mullins
2002	Strong Run	9	Paul Carberry	Noel Meade
2003	Flagship Uberalles	9	Richard Johnson	Philip Hobbs
2004	Moscow Flyer	10	Barry Geraghty	Jessica Harrington
2005	Rathgar Beau	9	Shay Barry	Dusty Sheehy
2006	Newmill	8	Andrew McNamara	John Joseph Murphy
2007	Mansony	8	Davy Russell	Arthur Moore
2008	Twist Magic	6	Ruby Walsh	Paul Nicholls
2009	Master Minded	6	Ruby Walsh	Paul Nicholls
2010	Golden Silver	8	Paul Townend	Willie Mullins
2011	Big Zeb	10	Barry Geraghty	Colm Murphy
2012	Sizing Europe	10	Andrew Lynch	Henry de Bromhead
2013	Sprinter Sacre	7	Barry Geraghty	Nicky Henderson
2014	Sizing Europe	12	Andrew Lynch	Henry de Bromhead
2015	Felix Yonger	9	Danny Mullins	Willie Mullins
2016	God's Own	8	Paddy Brennan	Tom George
2017	Fox Norton	7	Robbie Power	Colin Tizzard
2018	Un de Sceaux	10	Patrick Mullins	Willie Mullins
2019	Un de Sceaux	11	Paul Townend	Willie Mullins
	no race 2020 (Note: The 2020 running was cancelled because of the COVID-19 pandemic in the Republic of Ireland)
2021	Chacun Pour Soi	9	Paul Townend	Willie Mullins
2022	Energumene	8	Paul Townend	Willie Mullins
2023	Energumene	9	Paul Townend	Willie Mullins
2024	Banbridge	8	JJ Slevin	Joseph O'Brien
2025	Marine Nationale	8	Sean Flanagan	Barry Connell
2026	Il Etait Temps	8	Paul Townend	Willie Mullins

== Earlier winners ==
- 1950 – Melman
- 1951 – Third Estate
- 1952 – Clonfert
- 1953 – Tumble Weed
- 1954 – Nas Na Riogh
- 1955 – Shower of Silver
- 1956 – Shower of Silver
- 1957 – Jack's the Boy
- 1958 – Hern's Gift
- 1959 – Marchioness Bay
- 1960 – Some Other Day
- 1961 – Fortria
- 1962 – Highfield Lad
- 1963 – Scottish Memories
- 1964 – Flying Wind
- 1965 – Belle Artiste
- 1966 – Dicky May
- 1967 – Ronan
- 1968 – Black Ice
- 1969 – Muir
- 1970 – Muir
- 1971 – East Bound
- 1972 – Skymas
- 1973 – Skymas
- 1974 – Tingle Creek
- 1975 – Our Albert
- 1976 – High School
- 1977 – Simaroon
- 1978 – Shining Flame
- 1979 – Scottish Maid

== See also ==
- Horse racing in Ireland
- List of Irish National Hunt races
