= Harry Cobden =

British jockey

Personal information
- Born: 5 November 1998 (age 27) Somerset
- Occupation: Jockey

Horse racing career
- Sport: Horse racing

Racing awards
- British Champion Conditional Jockey (2015/16); British jump racing Champion Jockey (2023/24)

Harry Cobden (born 5 November 1998) is a British jockey who competes in National Hunt racing. He was British Champion Conditional Jockey in 2015/16 and went on to ride as first jockey to trainer Paul Nicholls. By the end of the 2023/24 season he had won 24 Grade 1 races. He was British jump racing Champion Jockey in 2023/24.

== Background ==
Cobden was born on 5 November 1998, the youngest of the two sons of Somerset farmers Sarah and Will Cobden, who also ran an abattoir. He learnt to ride as a small child and later took part in pony racing. In school holidays he worked in the yard of trainer Ron Hodges. A boarder at Sexey's School, he left without taking any GCSEs and went to work with local trainer Anthony Honeyball.

Cobden won the men's novice point-to-point title in the 2014/15 season and won his first race under rules on 33/1 outsider El Mondo in a hunter chase at Leicester on 6 March 2015.

== Career ==
At the beginning of the 2015/16 season, Cobden became conditional jockey to Paul Nicholls at Ditcheat in Somerset. He had been riding out for Nicholls in the summers since he was 13. He achieved his first Grade success in November 2015, when Old Guard won the Grade 3 Greatwood Hurdle for Nicholls. Irving, trained by Nicholls, provided him with his first Grade 1 victory when he won the Fighting Fifth Hurdle in November 2016. Cobden was crowned champion conditional jockey at the end of the 2016/17 season.

Cobden won his first Cheltenham Festival victory in the Albert Bartlett Novices' Hurdle in March 2018 on Kilbricken Storm, trained by Colin Tizzard. In April 2018, just before the Grand National meeting, he was offered the role of first jockey by both Colin Tizzard and Nicholls. Having ridden Ultragold 1 to a second consecutive victory in the Topham Chase for Tizzard and Diego Du Charmil to victory in the Maghull Novices' Chase. he decided to accept the offer for Nicholls, while continuing to ride for Tizzard. Soon after taking on the role as stable jockey to Nicholls, Cobden broke his C2 vertebra in a fall at Market Rasen and was sidelined for several months. In 2018/19, his first full season riding as stable jockey for Nicholls, he achieved four Grade 1 victories for the trainer, including the King George VI Chase on Clan des Obeaux.

By the end of the 2023/24 season, Cobden had won 866 races and achieved 24 Grade 1 victories over his career. He was crowned 2023/24 champion jump jockey, finishing the season seven wins ahead of Sean Bowen.

In January 2026 Cobden was named as J. P. McManus's retained jockey in Britain and Ireland, with the role beginning in May 2026.

== Life outside racing ==
Cobden lives on the family farm in Somerset, where he takes an active part in raising cattle. He also runs a shooting business on 13 acres of farmland.

== Cheltenham Festival winners (7) ==
- Albert Bartlett Novices' Hurdle - (2) Kilbricken Storm (2018), Stay Away Fay (2023)
- Broadway Novices' Chase - (2) Topofthegame (2019), Kitzbuhel (2026)
- Golden Miller Novices' Chase - (2) Stage Star (2023), Caldwell Potter (2025)
- Pertemps Final - (1) Monmiral (2024)

== Major wins ==
(United Kingdom) Great Britain

- Aintree Bowl - (2) Clan des Obeaux (2021, 2022)
- Anniversary 4-Y-O Juvenile Hurdle - (1) Monmiral (2021)
- Ascot Chase - (3) Cyrname (2019), Pic D'Orhy (2024, 2025)
- Celebration Chase - (1) Greaneteen (2022)
- Challow Novices' Hurdle - (5) Bravemansgame (2020), Stage Star (2021), Hermes Allen (2022), Captain Teague (2023), No Drama This End (2025)
- Fighting Fifth Hurdle - (1) Irving (2016)
- Henry VIII Novices' Chase - (1) Dynamite Dollars (2018)
- Kauto Star Novices' Chase - (1) Bravemansgame (2021)
- King George VI Chase - (2) Clan des Obeaux (2018), Bravemansgame (2022)
- Maghull Novices' Chase - (2) Diego Du Charmil (2018), Kalif Du Berlais (2025)
- Melling Chase - (1) Pic D'Orhy (2023)
- Mildmay Novices' Chase - (1) Caldwell Potter (2025)
- Sefton Novices' Hurdle - (1) Gelino Bello (2022)
- Tingle Creek Chase - (1) Politologue (2017)
- Tolworth Novices' Hurdle - (1) Tahmuras (2022)

(Republic of Ireland) Ireland

- Barberstown Castle Novice Chase - (1) Salvator Mundi (2026)
