= Tingle Creek Chase =

Steeplechase horse race in Britain

- Class: Grade 1
- Location: Sandown Park Racecourse; Esher, England
- Inaugurated: 1969
- Race type: Steeplechase
- Sponsor: Betfair
- Website: Sandown Park

Race information
- Distance: 1 mile 7 furlongs and 99 yards (3,108 metres)
- Surface: Turf
- Track: Right-handed
- Qualification: Four-years-old and up
- Weight: 11 st 4 lb (4yo); 11 st 10 lb (5yo+); Allowances; 7 lb for fillies and mares
- Purse: £175,000 (2025); 1st: £99,663

Tingle Creek Chase
2025
| Il Etait Temps | Jonbon | L'eau Du Sud |

Previous years
2024
Jonbon | Quilixios | JPR One
2023
Jonbon | Edwardstone | Haddex Des Obeaux
2022
Edwardstone | Greaneteen | Shishkin
2021
Greaneteen | Hitman | Captain Guinness

2020-2011
2020
Politologue | Greaneteen | Rouge Vif
2018
Altior | Un De Sceaux | Saint Calvados
2017
Politologue | Fox Norton | Ar Mad
2016
Un De Sceaux | Sire De Grugy | God's Own
2015
Sire De Grugy | Special Tiara | Vibrato Valtat
2014
Dodging Bullets | Somersby | Hinterland
2013
Sire de Grugy | Somersby | Captain Conan
2012
Sprinter Sacre | Kumbeshwar | Sanctuaire
2011
Sizing Europe | Kauto Stone | Cornas

2010-2001
2010
Master Minded | Petit Robin | Somersby
2009
Twist Magic | Forpadydeplasterer | Well Chief
2008
Master Minded | Tidal Bay | Takeroc
2007
Twist Magic | Voy Por Ustedes | Monet's Garden
2006
Kauto Star | Voy Por Ustedes | Oneway
2005
Kauto Star | Ashley Brook | Oneway
2004
Moscow Flyer | Azertyuiop | Well Chief
2003
Moscow Flyer | Azertyuiop | Flagship Uberalles
2002
Cenkos | Edredon Bleu | Wahiba Sands
2001
Flagship Uberalles | Edredon Bleu | Fadalko

2000-1991
2000
Flagship Uberalles | Fadalko | Bellator
1999
Flagship Uberalles | Direct Route | Edredon Bleu
1998
Direct Route | Edredon Bleu | Mandys Mantino
1997
Ask Tom | Viking Flagship | Or Royal
1996
Sound Man | Viking Flagship | Storm Alert
1995
Sound Man | Storm Alert | Travado
1994
Viking Flagship | Travado | Deep Sensation
1993
Sybillin | Deep Sensation | Waterloo Boy
1992
Waterloo Boy | Deep Sensation | Uncle Ernie
1991
Waterloo Boy | Young Snugfit | Moment of Truth

1990-1987
1990
Young Snugfit | Sabin Du Loir | Waterloo Boy
1989
Long Engagement | Desert Orchid | Prideaux Boy
1988
Desert Orchid | Jim Thorpe | Panto Prince
1987
Long Engagement | Desert Orchid | Amber Rambler

The Tingle Creek Chase is a Grade 1 National Hunt steeplechase in Great Britain which is open to horses aged four years or older. It is run at Sandown Park over a distance of about 1 mile 7½ furlongs (1 mile 7 furlongs and 99 yards, or 3,108 metres), and during its running there are thirteen fences to be jumped. The race is scheduled to take place each year in early December.

The event was first run in 1969 as the Benson & Hedges Gold Cup before being renamed the Mecca Bookmakers' Handicap Chase and then the Tingle Creek Handicap Chase in 1979, in honour of Tingle Creek, a popular National Hunt racehorse in the 1970s. Tingle Creek had a particularly good record in races at Sandown Park, winning the Sandown Park Pattern Handicap Chase three times amongst his 23 wins over obstacles in Britain and, in 1973, taking the race eventually named after him. The Tingle Creek Chase has been a Grade I race since 1994. Prior to 1994 it was run as a handicap race.

== Records ==
Most successful horse (3 wins):

- Flagship Uberalles – 1999, 2000, 2001

Leading jockey (5 wins):

- Richard Dunwoody – Lefrak City (1985), Waterloo Boy (1991, 1992), Sound Man (1995, 1996)

Leading trainer (12 wins):

- Paul Nicholls – Flagship Uberalles (1999), Cenkos (2002), Kauto Star (2005, 2006), Twist Magic (2007, 2009), Master Minded (2008, 2010), Dodging Bullets (2014), Politologue (2017, 2020), Greaneteen (2021)

== Winners ==
| Year | Winner | Age | Jockey | Trainer |
|---|---|---|---|---|
| 1969 (Note: The first running took place over a distance of 3m 118yd) | Spanish Steps | 6 | Johnny Cook | Edward Courage |
| 1970 | Even Keel | 8 | Barry Brogan | Ken Oliver |
| 1971 | Happy Medium | 9 | John Oaksey (Note: amateur jockey) | Roddy Armytage |
| 1972 (Note: The 1972 running took place at Kempton Park over a distance of 2m 170yd) | Pendil | 7 | Richard Pitman | Fred Winter |
| 1973 | Abandoned due to frost |
| 1974 | Dorlesa | 6 | Michael Dickinson | Tony Dickinson |
| 1975 | Easby Abbey | 8 | Ron Barry | Peter Easterby |
| 1976 | Abandoned due to frost |
| 1977 | Tree Tangle | 8 | Andy Turnell | Bob Turnell |
| 1978 | Abandoned due to frost |
| 1979 | Artifice | 8 | Richard Hoare | John Thorne |
| 1980 | Stopped | 8 | Ben de Haan | Fred Winter |
| 1981 | News King | 7 | John Francome | Fred Winter |
| 1982 | News King | 8 | John Francome | Fred Winter |
| 1983 | Abandoned due to frost |
| 1984 | Far Bridge | 8 | Brian Reilly | Toby Balding |
| 1985 | Lefrak City | 8 | Richard Dunwoody | Tim Forster |
| 1986 | Berlin | 7 | Dermot Browne | Nick Gaselee |
| 1987 | Long Engagement | 6 | Brendan Powell | David Nicholson |
| 1988 | Desert Orchid | 9 | Simon Sherwood | David Elsworth |
| 1989 | Long Engagement | 8 | Brendan Powell | David Nicholson |
| 1990 | Young Snugfit | 6 | Jamie Osborne | Oliver Sherwood |
| 1991 | Waterloo Boy | 8 | Richard Dunwoody | David Nicholson |
| 1992 | Waterloo Boy | 9 | Richard Dunwoody | David Nicholson |
| 1993 | Sybillin | 7 | Peter Niven | Jimmy FitzGerald |
| 1994 | Viking Flagship | 7 | Adrian Maguire | David Nicholson |
| 1995 | Sound Man | 7 | Richard Dunwoody | Edward O'Grady |
| 1996 | Sound Man | 8 | Richard Dunwoody | Edward O'Grady |
| 1997 | Ask Tom | 8 | Russ Garritty | Tom Tate |
| 1998 | Direct Route | 7 | Norman Williamson | Howard Johnson |
| 1999 | Flagship Uberalles | 5 | Joe Tizzard | Paul Nicholls |
| 2000 (Note: The 2000 and 2010 runnings took place at Cheltenham over a distance of 2m 110yd) | Flagship Uberalles | 6 | Richard Johnson | Noel Chance |
| 2001 | Flagship Uberalles | 7 | Robert Widger | Philip Hobbs |
| 2002 | Cenkos | 8 | Ruby Walsh | Paul Nicholls |
| 2003 | Moscow Flyer | 9 | Barry Geraghty | Jessica Harrington |
| 2004 | Moscow Flyer | 10 | Barry Geraghty | Jessica Harrington |
| 2005 | Kauto Star | 5 | Mick Fitzgerald | Paul Nicholls |
| 2006 | Kauto Star | 6 | Ruby Walsh | Paul Nicholls |
| 2007 | Twist Magic | 5 | Sam Thomas | Paul Nicholls |
| 2008 | Master Minded | 5 | Tony McCoy | Paul Nicholls |
| 2009 | Twist Magic | 7 | Ruby Walsh | Paul Nicholls |
| 2010 | Master Minded | 7 | Noel Fehily | Paul Nicholls |
| 2011 | Sizing Europe | 9 | Andrew Lynch | Henry de Bromhead |
| 2012 | Sprinter Sacre | 6 | Barry Geraghty | Nicky Henderson |
| 2013 | Sire De Grugy | 7 | Jamie Moore | Gary Moore |
| 2014 | Dodging Bullets | 6 | Sam Twiston-Davies | Paul Nicholls |
| 2015 | Sire De Grugy | 9 | Jamie Moore | Gary Moore |
| 2016 | Un de Sceaux | 8 | Ruby Walsh | Willie Mullins |
| 2017 | Politologue | 6 | Harry Cobden | Paul Nicholls |
| 2018 | Altior | 8 | Nico de Boinville | Nicky Henderson |
| 2019 | Defi Du Seuil | 6 | Barry Geraghty | Philip Hobbs |
| 2020 | Politologue | 9 | Harry Skelton | Paul Nicholls |
| 2021 | Greaneteen | 7 | Bryony Frost | Paul Nicholls |
| 2022 | Edwardstone | 8 | Tom Cannon | Alan King |
| 2023 | Jonbon | 7 | Nico de Boinville | Nicky Henderson |
| 2024 | Jonbon | 8 | Nico de Boinville | Nicky Henderson |
| 2025 | Il Etait Temps | 7 | Paul Townend | Willie Mullins |

== See also ==
- Horse racing in Great Britain
- List of British National Hunt races
