= Maghull Novices' Chase =

Steeplechase horse race in Britain

- Class: Grade 1
- Location: Aintree Racecourse; Merseyside, England
- Inaugurated: 1954
- Race type: steeplechase
- Sponsor: Poundland
- Website: Aintree

Race information
- Distance: 1m 7f 176y miles (3,178 metres)
- Surface: Turf
- Track: Left-handed
- Qualification: Five-years-old and up
- Weight: 11 st 4 lb Allowances; 7 lb for mares
- Purse: £120,000 (2022); 1st: £67,524

Maghull Novices' Chase
2026
Mirabad	Salvator Mundi	Be Aware

Previous years
2025
Kalif Du Berlais	Brookie	L'eau Du Sud
2024
Found A Fifty	Master Chewy	Libberty Hunter
2023
Jonbon	Marvel De Cerisy	Fusain
2022
Gentleman De Mee	Edwardstone	Third Time Lucki
2021
Shishkin	Funambule Sivola	Gumball

2020-2011
2019
Ornua	Us And Them	Destrier
2018
Diego Du Charmil	Petit Mouchoir	Shantou Rock
2017
San Benedeto	Forest Bihan	Charbel
2016
Douvan	The Game Changer	Fox Norton
2015
Sizing Granite	God's Own	Traffic Fluide
2014
Balder Succes	Simply Ned	Trifolium
2013
Special Tiara	Overturn	Alderwood
2012
Sprinter Sacre	Toubab	Kudu Country
2011
Finian's Rainbow	Ghizao	Dan Breen

2010-2001
2010
Tataniano	Osana	Archie Boy
2009
Kalahari King	Tatenen	Made in Taipan
2008
Tidal Bay	Takeroc	Modicum
2007
Twist Magic	Fair Along	Royal Shakespeare
2006
Foreman	Voy Por Ustedes	Le Volfoni
2005
Ashley Brook	War of Attrition	Dempsey
2004
Well Chief	Thisthatandtother	Mister McGoldrick
2003
Le Roi Miguel	Vol Solitaire	Impek
2002
Armaturk	Seebald	Fondmort
2001
Ballinclay King	Whitenzo	Simply Gifted

2000-1991
2000
Cenkos	Frozen Groom	Corniche
1999
Flagship Uberalles	Grimes	Dawn Leader
1998
Direct Route	Ashwell Boy	Champleve
1997
Squire Silk	Oh So Risky	Sublime Fellow
1996
Ask Tom	Lord Dorcet	Cable Beach
1995
Morceli	Dancing Paddy	Martin's Lamp
1994
Nakir	Jimmy The Gillie	Thumbs Up
1993
Valiant Boy	Shu Fly	Trimlough
1992
Cyphrate	Gale Again	Welsh Bard
1991
Young Benz	Uncle Ernie	Last 'O' The Bunch

1990-1988
1990
Boutzdaroff	Young Snugfit	Elfast
1989
Feroda	Fuego Boy	One More Knight
1988
Jim Thorpe	Danish Flight	Fervent Hope

The Maghull Novices' Chase is a Grade 1 National Hunt steeplechase in Great Britain which is open to horses aged five years or older. It is run at Aintree over a distance of about 2 miles (1 mile 7 furlong and 176 yards, or 3,178 metres), and during its running there are twelve fences to be jumped. The race is for novice chasers, and it is scheduled to take place each year during the Grand National meeting in early April.

The event was established in 1954, and it has been known by various titles. It is currently named after Maghull, a town located to the north of Aintree. For a period the race was classed at Grade 2 level, and it was promoted to Grade 1 status in 1995.

The Maghull Novices' Chase usually features horses which ran previously in the Arkle Challenge Trophy, and the last to win both events was Shishkin in 2021.

== Records ==
Leading jockey since 1977 (3 wins):

- Ruby Walsh – Le Roi Miguel (2003), Twist Magic (2007), Tataniano (2010)

Leading trainer since 1977 (9 wins):

- Paul Nicholls – Flagship Uberalles (1999), Armaturk (2002), Le Roi Miguel (2003), Twist Magic (2007), Tataniano (2010), San Benedeto (2017), Diego Du Charmil (2018), Kalif Du Berlais (2025)

== Winners ==
Year	Winner	Age	Jockey	Trainer
1954	Evian	6	Eddie McKenzie	Vincent O'Brien
1955	Wise Child	7	George Milburn	Verley Bewicke
1956	Sir Ken	9	Tim Molony	Willie Stephenson
1957	Northern King	6	Mick Pumfrey	Eric Cousins
1958	Just Awake	6	Arthur Freeman	Peter Cazalet
1959	Liquidator	7	Paddy Farrell	Charlie Hall
1960	Cupid's Charge	5	Arthur Freeman	Peter Cazalet
1961	Peacetown	7	Stan Mellor	George Owen
1962	Rye Light	10	Paddy Farrell	Charlie Hall
1963	Border Sparkle	7	Tommy McGinley	Noel Robinson
1964	Brand X	9	Roy Edwards	Frank Cundell
1965	Oedipe	7	Stan Mellor	Peter Cazalet
1966	Roe Gemmel	7	Graham Macmillan (Note: amateur jockey)	George Fairbairn
1967	Glenn	6	Terry Biddlecombe	Fred Rimell
1968	Brian's Best	8	Roy Edwards	George Owen
1969	Rainbow Cottage	6	Stan Murphy	Arthur Stephenson
1970	Tenterclef	8	Barry Brogan	Peter Ransom
1971	Vegeo	8	David Nicholson	Arthur Stephenson
1972	Explicit	8	Tommy Stack	L Shedden
1973	Line Regiment	9	Jimmy Bourke	Doug Francis
1974	Winter Rain	6	Michael Dickinson	Tony Dickinson
1975	Tom Morgan	6	Colin Tinkler	Ken Oliver
1976	Vaguely Attractive	7	John Fowler	S Murphy
1977	Siberian Sun	6	Frank Berry	Francis Flood
1978	Another Dolly	8	John Burke	Fred Rimell
1979	Night Nurse	8	Jonjo O'Neill	Peter Easterby
1980	Western Rose	8	Sam Morshead	Fred Rimell
1981	Irian	7	Frank Berry	Arthur Moore
1982	Brave Fellow	8	Tony Charlton	Jimmy FitzGerald
1983	Ryeman	6	Alan Brown	Peter Easterby
1984	Noddy's Ryde	7	Neale Doughty	Gordon W. Richards
1985	Pan Arctic	6	Philip Hobbs	Tom Bill
1986	Pearlyman	7	Paul Barton	John Edwards
1987	Dan the Miller	8	Graham Bradley	Monica Dickinson
1988	Jim Thorpe	7	Chris Grant	Gordon W. Richards
1989	Feroda	8	Tom Taaffe	Arthur Moore
1990	Boutzdaroff	8	Derek Byrne	Jimmy FitzGerald
1991	Young Benz	7	Lorcan Wyer	Peter Easterby
1992	Cyphrate	6	Peter Scudamore	Martin Pipe
1993	Valiant Boy	7	Russ Garritty	Steve Kettlewell
1994	Nakir	6	Jamie Osborne	Simon Christian
1995	Morceli	7	Norman Williamson	Howard Johnson
1996	Ask Tom	7	Peter Niven	Tom Tate
1997	Squire Silk	8	Jamie Osborne	Andrew Turnell
1998	Direct Route	7	Paul Carberry	Howard Johnson
1999	Flagship Uberalles	5	Joe Tizzard	Paul Nicholls
2000	Cenkos	6	David Casey	Oliver Sherwood
2001	Ballinclay King	7	Adrian Maguire	Ferdy Murphy
2002	Armaturk	5	Timmy Murphy	Paul Nicholls
2003	Le Roi Miguel	5	Ruby Walsh	Paul Nicholls
2004	Well Chief	5	Tony McCoy	Martin Pipe
2005	Ashley Brook	7	Paddy Brennan	Kevin Bishop
2006	Foreman	8	Tony McCoy	Thierry Doumen
2007	Twist Magic	5	Ruby Walsh	Paul Nicholls
2008	Tidal Bay	7	Denis O'Regan	Howard Johnson
2009	Kalahari King	8	Graham Lee	Ferdy Murphy
2010	Tataniano	6	Ruby Walsh	Paul Nicholls
2011	Finian's Rainbow	8	Barry Geraghty	Nicky Henderson
2012	Sprinter Sacre	6	Barry Geraghty	Nicky Henderson
2013	Special Tiara	6	Bryan Cooper	Henry de Bromhead
2014	Balder Succes	6	Wayne Hutchinson	Alan King
2015	Sizing Granite	7	Jonathan Burke	Henry de Bromhead
2016	Douvan	6	Paul Townend	Willie Mullins
2017	San Benedeto	6	Nick Scholfield	Paul Nicholls
2018	Diego Du Charmil	6	Harry Cobden	Paul Nicholls
2019	Ornua	8	Davy Russell	Henry de Bromhead
	no race 2020 (Note: The 2020 running was cancelled because of the COVID-19 pandemic in the United Kingdom)
2021	Shishkin	7	Nico de Boinville	Nicky Henderson
2022	Gentleman De Mee	6	Mark Walsh	Willie Mullins
2023	Jonbon	7	Aidan Coleman	Nicky Henderson
2024	Found A Fifty	7	Jack Kennedy	Gordon Elliott
2025	Kalif Du Berlais	5	Harry Cobden	Paul Nicholls
2026	Mirabad	7	Tristan Durrell	Dan Skelton

== See also ==
- Horse racing in Great Britain
- List of British National Hunt races
