= Sam Twiston-Davies =

British National Hunt racing jockey

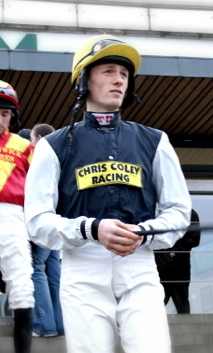
Sam Twiston-Davies at Aintree

Sam Twiston-Davies (born 15 October 1992) is a British National Hunt racing jockey who has multiple Grade 1 and Cheltenham Festival wins to his name.

== Background ==
Twiston-Davies comes from a racing background. His father is trainer Nigel Twiston-Davies and his mother is a former point-to-point rider. Younger brother William Twiston-Davies is also a former jockey. Twiston Davies grew up in Naunton, Gloucestershire and attended The Cotswold School. As a sixteen-year-old amateur rider, he rode Baby Run, trained by his father, into third place in the Foxhunter Chase at the 2009 Cheltenham Festival. The following year the pair won the race. In April 2010, he was granted special dispensation by the British Horseracing Authority to ride in the Grand National, although he was one win short of the 15 required to qualify for the race. He finished fifth on Hello Bud, trained by his father.

== Professional jockey ==
Twiston-Davies turned professional in 2010 and won the Conditional Jockeys Championship in the 2010/11 season with 59 wins, including the Grade 3 Paddy Power Gold Cup on Little Josh, trained by his father. In November 2011, by which time he had ridden out his claim, he won a bumper at Warwick on The New One, trained by his father. It was the start of a successful partnership with Twiston-Davies riding the gelding in 35 of his 40 starts. They won 18 races together, including the Grade 1 Baring Bingham Novices' Hurdle at the 2013 Cheltenham Festival.

He achieved his first century in the 2013/14 season, with 115 winners. In April 2014, Somerset-based trainer Paul Nicholls announced that Twiston-Davies would be appointed number one stable jockey for his yard in the 2014/15 season. At the 2015 Cheltenham Festival he had a day two double for Nicholls, the Queen Mother Champion Chase with Dodging Bullets and with Aux Ptits Soins in the Coral Cup. This was followed by a Grade 1 double for the trainer at the 2015 Aintree Festival. In 2016 he had a double on day one of the Cheltenham Festival with wins in the Fred Winter Juvenile Novices' Handicap Hurdle and Champion Bumper, and a third win on the Friday in the Grand Annual Chase. In April 2016 he won the Scottish Grand National on Vicente for Nicholls, and repeated the feat the following year. In May 2018 he announced he would become freelance. Although no longer number one stable jockey for Nicholls, a role that was taken over by Harry Cobden, Twiston Davies continued to ride for the trainer. In December 2019, he won the Grade 1 King George VI Chase on Nicholls' second-string, Clan des Obeaux, while Cobden came second on the favourite, Cyrname.

After seven years without a Cheltenham Festival winner, Twiston-Davies rode The Real Whacker, trained by Patrick Neville, to a photo-finish victory in the Broadway Novices' Chase.

== Cheltenham Festival winners ==
Cheltenham Festival winners (7)
Year	Race	Mount	Trainer
2010	Foxhunter Chase	Baby Run	Nigel Twiston-Davies
2013	Baring Bingham Novices' Hurdle	The New One	Nigel Twiston-Davies
2015	Queen Mother Champion Chase	Dodging Bullets	Paul Nicholls
2015	Coral Cup	Aux Ptits Soins	Paul Nicholls
2016	Fred Winter Juvenile Novices' Handicap Hurdle	Diego du Charmil	Paul Nicholls
2016	Champion Bumper	Ballyandy	Nigel Twiston-Davies
2016	Grand Annual Chase	Solar Impulse	Paul Nicholls
2023	Broadway Novices' Chase	The Real Whacker	Patrick Neville

== Other major wins ==
(United Kingdom) Great Britain

- Anniversary 4-Y-O Juvenile Hurdle - (1) - All Yours (2015)
- Ascot Chase - (1) - Riders Onthe Storm (2020)
- Finale Juvenile Hurdle - (1) - Quel Destin (2018)
- Formby Novices' Hurdle - (1) - Potters Charm (2024)
- King George VI Chase - (1) - Clan des Obeaux (2019)
- Melling Chase - (1) - Politologue (2018)
- Mildmay Novices' Chase - (1) - Saphir Du Rheu (2015)
- Tingle Creek Chase - (1) - Dodging Bullets (2014)
- Aintree Hurdle - (1) - The New One (2014)

(Republic of Ireland) Ireland

- Punchestown Gold Cup - (1) - Clan des Obeaux (2021)

France

- Grande Course de Haies d'Auteuil - (1) - Ptit Zig (2016)
