= Tingle Creek =

American bred, British-trained Thoroughbred steeplechaser (1966–1996)

- Sire: Goose Creek
- Grandsire: Requested
- Dam: Martingle
- Damsire: Flushing
- Sex: Gelding
- Foaled: 1966
- Country: United States
- Colour: Chestnut
- Trainer: Tom Jones
- Record: 80:31-16-8
- Earnings: $162,819

Major wins
- Tom Roby Stp Stakes (1970); Indian River Steeplechase Handicap (1970); Broad Hollow Stp Handicap( 1970); Sandown Handicap Pattern Race (3 wins); Benson & Hedges Gold Cup Chase (1973); Punchestown Champion Chase (1974)

Honours
- Tingle Creek Chase at Sandown Park
- Last updated on 18 November 2023

Tingle Creek (1966–1996) was an American-bred, British-trained steeplechaser of the 1970s. A handsome, lightly built chestnut horse with a white blaze under a white headband, Tingle Creek was a top-class performer at two miles and won 31 of 80 starts worldwide (23 of 52 races in the UK). He was also a favourite of racing fans for his fearless frontrunning, despite often giving away substantial weight, and never falling.

He specialised at two miles and performed best at Sandown Park, a right-handed racecourse, breaking the track record numerous times. Cheltenham, a left-handed track, was the only course where Tingle Creek struggled.

Timeform considered Tingle Creek the best two miler around when conditions were in his favour.

Jockey Steve Smith Eccles, who became Tingle Creek's regular jockey in 1977, considered the horse "absolutely unbelievable. I never rode a more exciting jumper... He was flat out from start to finish and he would just eat fences".

A son of Goose Creek, who ran as a sprinter and miler, the horse began his career successfully in the United States but came to England at an early stage. He wore distinctive white bandages on his forelegs and had a white sock on his left legs.

Tingle Creek was retired in November 1978. Until his death in 1996, he made an appearance at Sandown Park before the race named in his honour in 1979. He had won that race, carrying 12 st 5 lb., in 1973.
