= Viking Flagship =

Irish-bred Thoroughbred racehorse

- Sire: Viking
- Dam: Fourth Degree
- Damsire: Oats
- Sex: Gelding
- Foaled: 1987
- Country: Ireland
- Colour: Bay
- Breeder: Miss E C Holdsworth
- Owner: C G Roach
- Trainer: Miss E C Holdsworth; Martin Pipe; W M Halley; David Nicholson
- Record: 73: 24-11-8
- Earnings: £601,814

Major wins
- Punchestown Champion Chase (1993); Swordlestown Cup Novice Chase (1993); Victor Chandler Chase (1994); Game Spirit Chase (1994, 1996); Queen Mother Champion Chase (1994, 1995); Tingle Creek Chase (1994); Castleford Chase (1994, 1997); Melling Chase (1995, 1996); Haldon Gold Cup (1997)
- Last updated on December 5, 2008

Viking Flagship (1987–2000) was an Irish racehorse who began his racing career in October 1989 as a 2-year-old. He was first trained by his breeder, Eithne C Holdsworth, in Co. Kilkenny and then by Martin Pipe. He had 18 starts in Ireland with these two trainers, all in Ireland, but did not win any of them.

== Season 1990-1991 ==
In December 1990, his trainer sent him over hurdles, and on his hurdling debut, Viking Flagship fell at Wolverhampton. In his next start, he was beaten by a head into second place at Newton Abbot, before going on to complete a four timer in Novice Hurdles between February and April 1991. After this, he changed yards and joined new trainer W M Halley, for whom he had his first start at Punchestown in April 1991, where he finished 6th. That proved to be his only start under the trainer, as he changed yards again in the summer, joining David Nicholson.

== Season 1991-1992 ==
Viking Flagship began the season finishing down the field in a handicap hurdle at Newton Abbot and followed that up with a 4th place finish in his next 2 starts. After winning a Taunton handicap on his next start, he contested some valuable handicaps for the remainder of the season. He finished placed in the Imperial Cup, County Handicap Hurdle, and Cordon Bleu Handicap at Aintree on his final start of the season.

== Season 1992-1993 ==
Viking Flagship embarked on a novice chasing campaign and did not reappear until February 1993, where he fell on his first start over fences at the beginning of February. However, he bounced back and completed a hat-trick over fences between the 8th and 25 February. He followed that up with 2 wins within 3 days at the Punchestown Festival.

== Season 1993-1994 ==
He began with two second-place finishes in handicaps, before he won the Victor Chandler Chase in January and the Game Spirit Chase in February. That was followed with a neck victory in the prestigious Queen Mother Champion Chase. On his final start that season, Viking Flagship finished an 11-length second to Uncle Ernie in the Martell Aintree Chase.

== Season 1994-1995 ==
He made his seasonal debut in the Tingle Creek Chase, where he was a 3-1/2-length winner, before winning the Castleford Chase later that month. He then finished 5th in the Victor Chandler Chase, fell in the Game Spirit Chase, and finishing 2nd in the Emblem Chase at Kempton, where he failed by a length when giving away a stone in weight. He then went back to Cheltenham, where he was sent off the 5/2 favourite for the Queen Mother Champion Chase and scored a 5-length victory over Deep Sensation. He ended the season at Aintree, where he won the Melling Chase at the same price.

== Season 1995-1996 ==
On his seasonal debut, Viking Flagship finished a distant 4th in the Tingle Creek Chase. After finishing a 15-length third in the John Bull Chase in his next start, he won the Game Spirit Chase at Newbury and the Emblem Chase at Kempton. He returned to Cheltenham for his next start, where he finished 2nd in the Queen Mother Champion Chase, before winning the Melling Chase again.

== Season 1996-1997 ==
The season only brought one success for Viking Flagship in the Emblem Chase, but he also placed in the Queen Mother Champion Chase and the Melling Chase.

== Season 1997-1998 ==
The season proved to be the final season of Viking Flagship's racing career. He began by beating Mulligan by 5 lengths in the Haldon Gold Cup. He then went back to Sandown for the Tingle Creek Chase, where he went down by a head to Ask Tom. After winning the Castleford Chase again, he finished 3rd and 5th respectively in the Game Spirit Chase and the Queen Mother Champion Chase.

Viking Flagship died in 2000.
