= Wincanton Racecourse =

Horse racing venue in England

Coordinates: 51.0647°N 2.4226°W

Wincanton
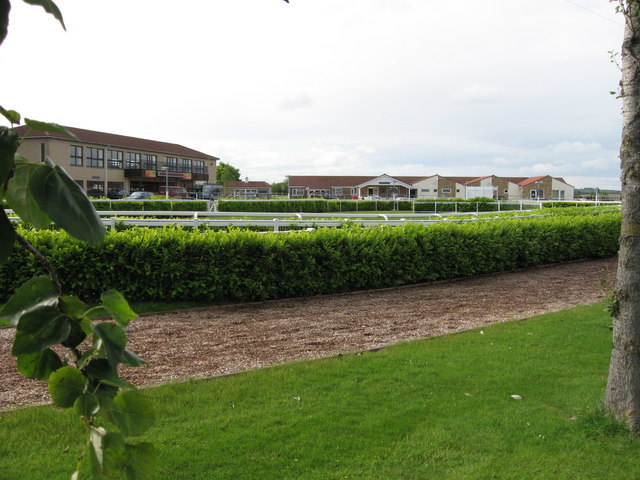
- Main Buildings and Parade ring
- Interactive map of Wincanton
- Location: Wincanton, Somerset, England
- Owned by: Jockey Club Racecourses
- Screened on: Racing TV
- Course type: National Hunt
- Notable races: Kingwell Hurdle

Wincanton Racecourse is a thoroughbred horse racing venue located in Wincanton, Somerset, England.

The steeplechase fences are large, making the course a demanding test for chasers. Three fences positioned in quick succession during the second half of the home straight make for exciting racing and can dramatically alter the outcome of a finish, often resulting in closely contested races.

The track stages several big races, including the Kingwell Hurdle in February. The CGA Chase (previously the Jim Ford Challenge Cup, last run in 2012) was run on the same day; these races were significant trials for the Champion Hurdle and Cheltenham Gold Cup respectively. Several of the races at the course were shown on Channel 4 and are now occasionally shown on ITV.

The track is located near to the yard of the trainer, Paul Nicholls and as such many of his young horses run here.

== Notable races ==
Month	DOW	Race Name	Type	Grade	Distance	Age/Sex
February	Saturday	Kingwell Hurdle	Hurdle	Grade 2	1m 7f	4yo +
November	Saturday	Badger Beers Handicap Chase	Chase	Premier Handicap	3m 1f	4yo+
November	Saturday	Rising Stars Novices' Chase	Chase	Grade 2	2m 4f	4yo +
