= Clan des Obeaux =

French-bred Thoroughbred racehorse

Clan Des Obeaux
- Sire: Kapgarde
- Dam: Nausicaa Des Obeaux
- Damsire: April Night
- Sex: Gelding
- Foaled: 2 April 2012
- Country: France
- Colour: Bay
- Breeder: Mme Marie Devilder
- Owner: Mr & Mrs Paul Barber, G Mason & Alex Ferguson
- Trainer: Paul Nicholls
- Record: 31:11-10-3
- Earnings: £1,076,186

Major wins
- King George VI Chase (2018, 2019); Betway Bowl (2021, 2022); Punchestown Gold Cup (2021)

Clan des Obeaux (foaled 2 April 2012) is a French AQPS (non-thoroughbred racehorse) competing in National Hunt racing. He is notably owned by a partnership which includes former Manchester United manager Alex Ferguson.

== Career ==
Clan des Obeaux was bred in France by Mme Marie Devilder. Winning a first race at La Roche Sur Yon, the horse was sold to the United Kingdom and moved to trainer Paul Nicholls.

Clan Des Obeaux's first race in Britain came at Newbury in December 2015, winning a Juvenile Hurdle by 21 lengths. Two unsuccessful outings at Cheltenham followed, including a sixth place in the Triumph Hurdle.

For the 2016 season, Clan des Obeaux went over the Chase fences, winning at Newbury on his second attempt. Further victories in 2017 at Exeter and Haydock would follow, before a first Grade I success came, winning the 2018 King George VI Chase ahead of Thistlecrack. Victory in the Denman Chase at Ascot followed, before finishing 5th in the Cheltenham Gold Cup.

Clan des Obeaux defended his title winning the 2019 King George VI Chase, this time with Sam Twiston-Davies. After a disappointing run in the Cheltenham Gold Cup, Clan Des Obeaux had wind surgery, and returned to the racecourse 253 days later at Haydock Park finishing 2nd in the Betfair Chase. The first victory after the break would come at Aintree in the Grade I Betway Bowl, followed by success in the Punchestown Gold Cup a couple of weeks later. Clan Des Obeaux successfully defended his Betway Bowl title in 2022, but only managed 2nd in defence of the Punchestown Gold Cup.
