= Master Minded =

French-bred Thoroughbred racehorse

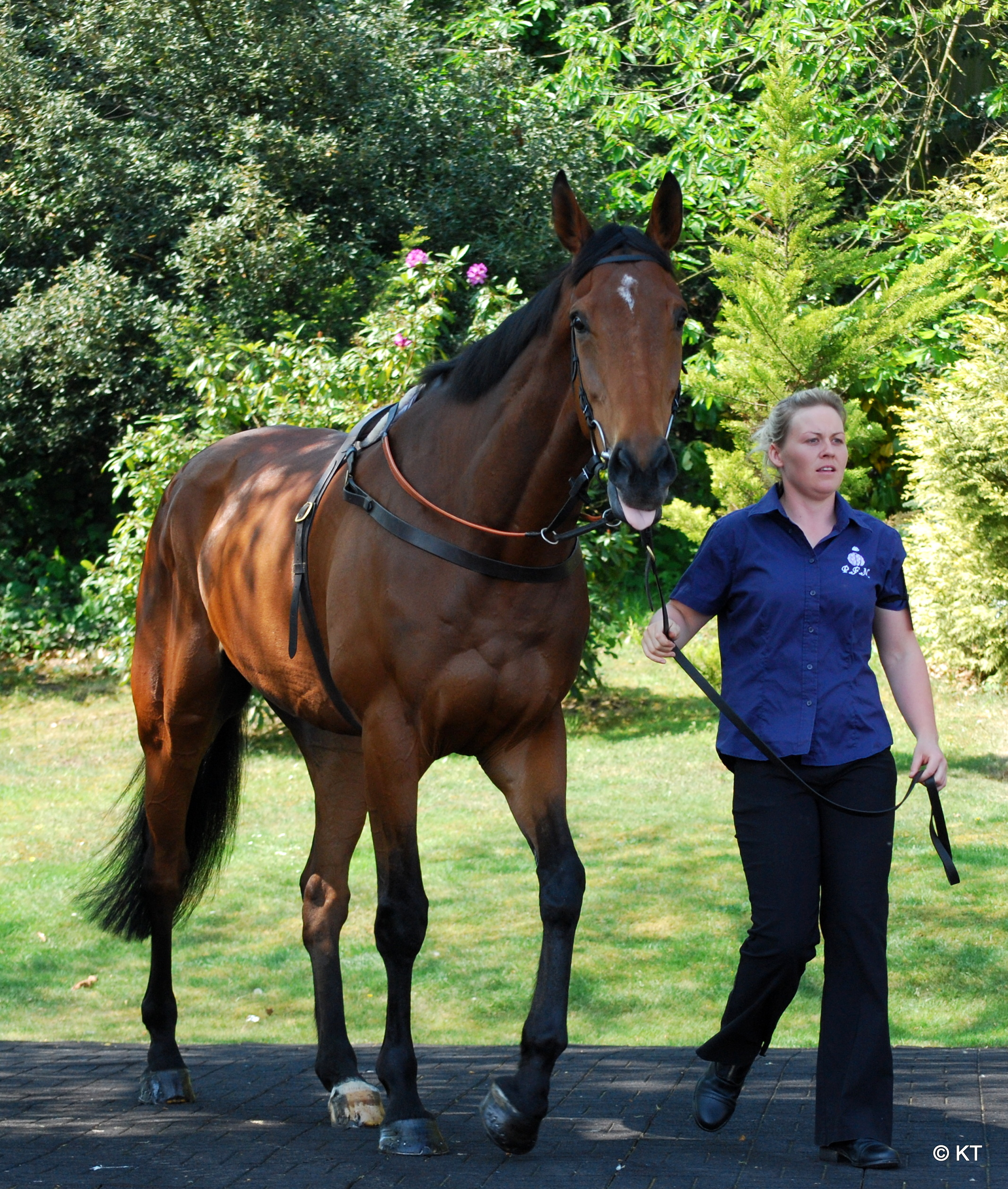
- Master Minded at Sandown in 2011.
- Sire: Nikos
- Grandsire: Nonoalco
- Dam: Haute Tension
- Damsire: Garde Royale
- Sex: Gelding
- Foaled: 2003
- Country: France
- Colour: Bay
- Breeder: Marie-Christine Gabeur
- Owner: Mrs Benoît Gabeur; Clive D. Smith (2007–)
- Trainer: Guillaume Macaire; Paul Nicholls (2007–)
- Record: 16: 9-2-0
- Earnings: £971,931

Major wins
- Game Spirit Chase (2008, 2010); Queen Mother Champion Chase (2008, 2009); Tingle Creek Chase (2008, 2010); Victor Chandler Chase (2009, 2011); Kerrygold Champion Chase (2009); Melling Chase (2011)
- Last updated on April 29, 2009

Master Minded (foaled April 14, 2003) is a French bred National Hunt racehorse who was trained in Great Britain by Paul Nicholls.

== Early days in France ==
Master Minded started his National Hunt career in France. He was initially trained by Guillaume Macaire and owned by Mme Benoit Gabeur. He started his career with 8 runs at Auteuil from 4 October 2006 as a three-year-old to 27 May 2007. He had 3 wins and a fourth, pulling up once, two falls, and possible his best run when he finished runner-up in the 2007 Prix Ferdinand Dufaure. Prior to this run, Clive Smith (owner of Kauto Star) had bought him, and Ruby Walsh had his first ride on the horse in that race.

== 2007–2008 season ==
In 2007, Master Minded joined the powerful Ditcheat stable of Paul Nicholls to begin chasing. He was not a novice following his win in France so was entered against seasoned campaigners. Nicholls found an easy opening for him at Exeter Racecourse in a 4 runner graduation Chase where Sam Thomas took the ride, but the horse made a serious error and unseated Thomas.

Nicholls took Master Minded up a class to run at Sandown on 5 January 2008 in the Free £25 Bet partybets.com Handicap Chase at Sandown, which he won. After the race he was now starting to be taken seriously as a Cheltenham Festival horse and was made 8–1 favourite for the RyanAir Chase and 25-1 for the Champion Chase.

Master Minded stepped up another step in his next run, the Game Spirit Chase at Newbury (9 February 2008), which is a very important stepping stone to the Queen Mother Champion Chase. He beat a top-class field including the defending champion, Voy Por Ustedes, and was now being seriously as a candidates for major honours.

On 13 March 2008 as a five-year-old, Master Minded became the youngest horse to win the prestigious Queen Mother Champion Chase at the Cheltenham Festival since the race was established in 1959. Ridden by Ruby Walsh, he defeated the previous year's winner, Voy Por Ustedes, by 19 lengths. John Francome said that on that form, Master Minded could have won any race in the Festival; he also described the horse as "scary". Coincidentally, his trainer in his early years, Macaire, had also previously trained both Runner Up Voy Por Ustedes and another of the 2008 Champion Chase runners, Twist Magic (sixth).

Master Minded was now highest rated Chaser in the world and had one more run at Aintree, where he lost to Voy Por Ustedes. The Racing Post said, "As much as Voy Por Ustedes relished the rapidly drying conditions, Master Minded intermittently looked uneasy, certainly not jumping or travelling with the zest he showed at Cheltenham. That might be as much to do with a change of tactics. He set off last and was put immediately on the back foot off the fast pace by getting in close to the first, possibly frightening himself, as he was careful over the second. He telegraphed his second-last boneshaker first time and was again ragged over the same set of fences down the back straight. He still moved up strongly around the home bend and there was everything to play for before it simply looked like he ran out of stamina, which is what connections reported. He was 12 lengths down halfway up the run-in before being eased to accentuate his beating. He remains the one to beat over 2m. It could also turn out that like another top 2m chaser from France, Edredon Bleu, he is happiest bowling along and putting his rivals under pressure. A return to those tactics could restore his air of invincibility."

Master Minded finished the 2007/2008 jumps season as the highest-rated chaser in the world.

== 2008–2009 season ==
Master Minded started the season with a victory in the Tingle Creek Chase at Sandown Park. He was ridden by A P McCoy, as Ruby Walsh was injured having had his spleen removed following a fall a fortnight prior.

His next run was another easy victory in the Victor Chandler chase at Ascot, where Ruby Walsh was back on board. He said that "this horse is not a machine—he is an aeroplane" and Nicholls said he was the best he had ever trained which is high praise indeed.

With Walsh at the helm, Master Minded won the 2009 Queen Mother Champion Chase, a race he had also won the previous year.

== 2009–2010 season ==
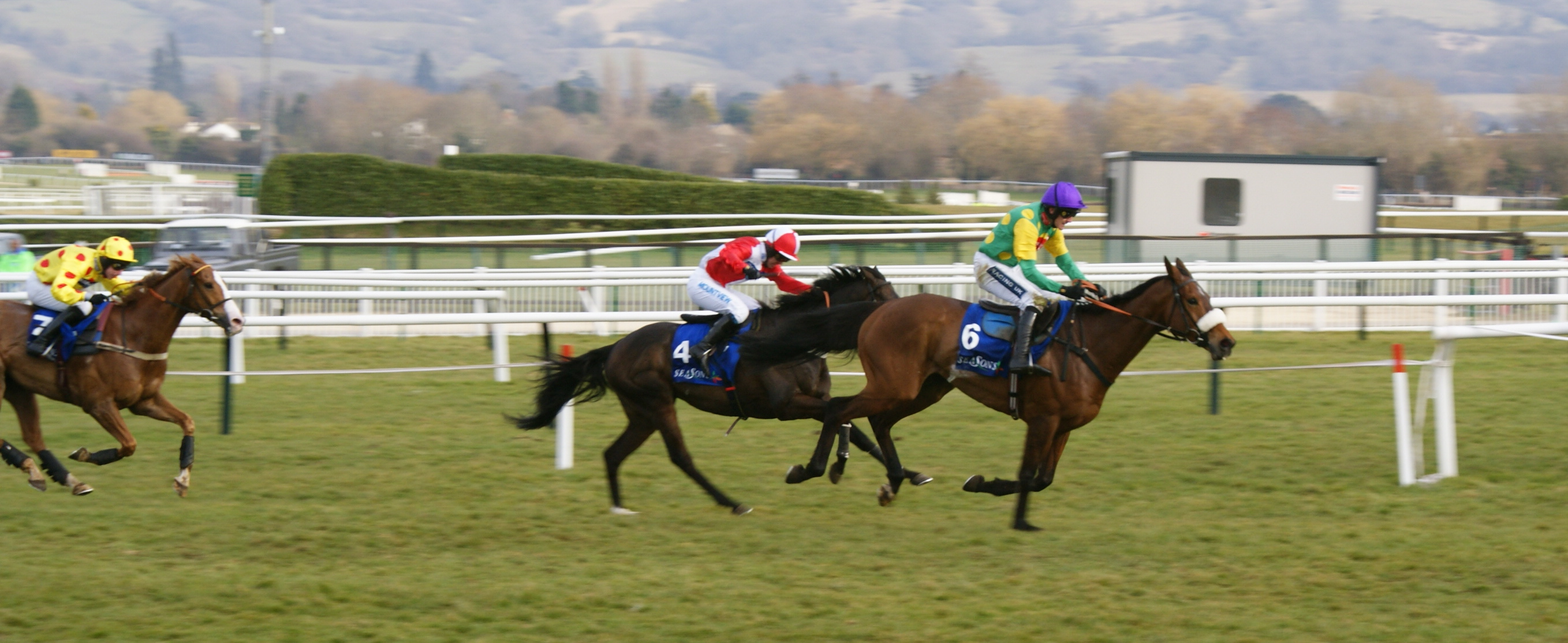
Master Minded (#6) in 2010 Queen Mother Champion Chase.

Master Minded finished fourth behind Big Zeb, an Irish horse, owned by Patrick Joseph Redmond, on 17 March 2010 in the Queen Mother Champion Chase at the Cheltenham Festival.

== See also ==
- Independent article – "Master's supremacy steals the show"
- pedigreequery.com – Master Minded's pedigree
- racingpost.com – Master Minded's race record
- Telegraph.co.uk – Master Minded is the best horse I've ever trained says trainer Paul Nicholls
