= Conditional jockey =

Apprentice jockey in British or Irish National Hunt racing

A conditional jockey is an apprentice National Hunt racing jockey in Great Britain or Ireland under the age of 26 who has not won more than seventy-five races under rules or had not won that many races within the last six months.

A conditional jockey is entitled to a reduction, known as an allowance, in the weight carried by his or her horse, dependent on the type of race, which varies according to the number of races the jockey has won. A jockey who has ridden fewer than twenty winners can claim an allowance of seven pounds, one who has ridden between twenty and forty winners can claim a five pound allowance and one who has ridden less than seventy-five winners can claim a three pound allowance. A conditional jockey with fewer than five winners is allowed a further three pounds when riding for the stable which employs him. Allowances cannot be claimed when riding in races restricted to conditional jockeys and in some other instances, for example the Grand National.

The British conditional jockeys championship runs throughout the National Hunt season and the title is won by the conditional jockey riding the most winners. The 2025–26 championship was won by Tristan Durrell.
