= Harry Skelton =

British jockey

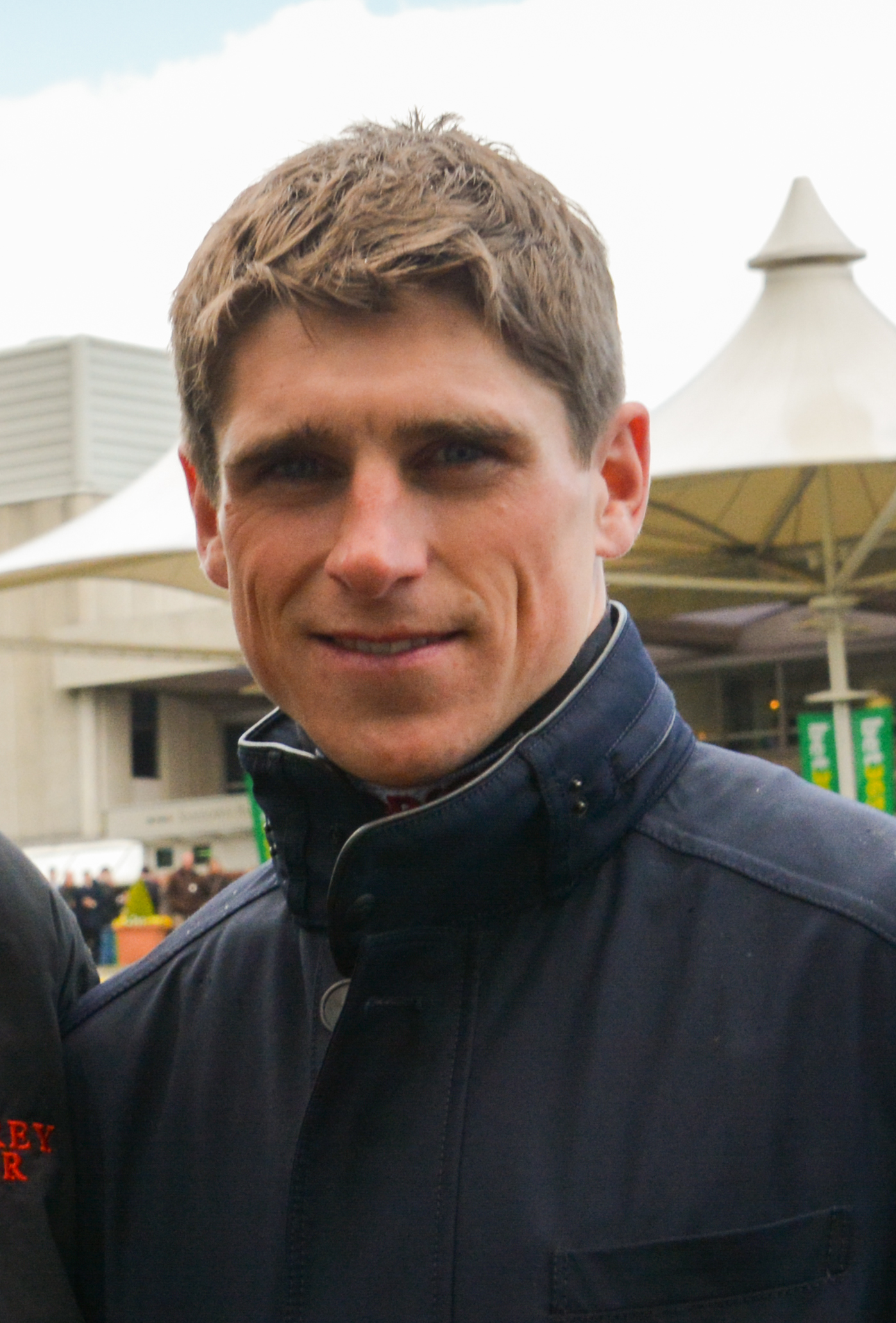
- Skelton at Sandown 2016

Personal information
- Born: 20 September 1989 (age 37)
- Occupation: Jockey
- Spouse: Bridget Andrews (m. 2019)
- Children: 2

Horse racing career
- Sport: Horse racing
- Career winnings: £8,085,487
- Career wins: 1095

Major racing wins
- Mersey Novices Hurdle (2021); Manifesto Novices' Chase (2021); Kauto Star Novices' Chase (2020); Tingle Creek Chase (2020); Henry VIII Novices' Chase (2020); Queen Mother Champion Chase (2020); Coral Finale Juvenile Hurdle (2019); David Nicholson Mares' Hurdle (2019)

Racing awards
- British Champion Jump Jockey (2020/2021)

Significant horses
- My Drogo, Protektorat, Shan Blue, Politologue, Allmankind, Roksana

Harry Skelton (born 20 September 1989) is a British jockey who competes in National Hunt racing. Skelton was the 2020–2021 British Champion Jump Jockey.

== Career ==
Skelton started his racing career with Richard Hannon on the flat, before switching to jump racing and joined his brother, Dan, who was assistant trainer to Paul Nicholls in Somerset. In 2009, he became the youngest winner of the Irish Grand National on Niche Market trained by Bob Buckler. In 2011, he won his first Grade 2 race with Celestial Halo in the National Spirit Hurdle at Fontwell Park.

In 2013, Skelton joined his brother who had set up Dan Skelton Racing in Warwickshire as the new yard's lead jockey. Skelton has won a number of Grade 1 races including four at the Cheltenham Festival. In 2021, he was crowned British champion jump Jockey for the first time, riding 152 winners in the season. In the same year, Skelton was awarded "Jump Jockey of the Year" at the Lester Awards.

== Personal life ==
Skelton is the son of British gold medal winning Olympian Nick Skelton and brother of horse racing trainer Dan Skelton. In 2019, he married fellow jockey Bridget Andrews. Andrews gave birth to their son Rory on 27 April 2024. and a daughter, Anna, on 20 November 2025.

== Cheltenham Festival winners (12) ==
- Queen Mother Champion Chase - (1) Politologue (2020)
- Baring Bingham Novices' Hurdle - (1) The New Lion (2025)
- Ryanair Chase - (1) Protektorat (2024)
- Golden Miller Novices' Chase - (1) Grey Dawning (2024)
- David Nicholson Mares' Hurdle - (1) Roksana (2019)
- County Handicap Hurdle - (2) Superb Story (2016), Ch'tibello (2019)
- Coral Cup - (2) Langer Dan (2023, 2024)
- Johnny Henderson Grand Annual Chase - (1) Unexpected Party (2024)
- Sun Racing Plate Handicap Chase - (1) Madara (2026)
- Pertemps Final - (1) Supremely West (2026)

== Major wins ==
(United Kingdom) Great Britain

- Henry VIII Novices' Chase - (2) Allmankind (2020), L'Eau Du Sud (2024)
- Tingle Creek Chase - (1) Politologue (2020)
- Kauto Star Novices' Chase - (1) Shan Blue (2020)
- Finale Juvenile Hurdle - (1) Allmankind (2019)
- Manifesto Novices' Chase - (1) Protektorat (2021)
- Melling Chase - (1) Grey Dawning (2026)
- Betfair Chase - (3) Protektorat (2022), Grey Dawning (2025, 2026)
- Mersey Novices' Hurdle - (2) My Drogo (2021), Bossman Jack (2026)
- Challow Novices' Hurdle - (1) The New Lion (2024)
