= Philip Hobbs =

British racehorse trainer

Philip Hobbs (born 26 July 1955) is a British racehorse trainer specializing mainly in National Hunt racing. He is based at stables near Minehead, Somerset.

His biggest wins have come with Flagship Uberalles in the 2002 Queen Mother Champion Chase, Rooster Booster in the 2003 Champion Hurdle, Detroit City in the 2006 Triumph Hurdle and Massini's Maguire in the 2007 Ballymore Properties Novices' Hurdle. He has also trained flat race winners, notably winning the 2006 Cesarewitch Handicap with Detroit City.

He was played by Nicholas Farrell in the 2020 film Dream Horse about Welsh Grand National winner Dream Alliance.

He had his 3,000th winner at Newbury on 11 February 2023 with Zanza.

== Cheltenham winners (19) ==
- Champion Hurdle - (1) Rooster Booster (2003)
- Queen Mother Champion Chase - (1) Flagship Uberalles (2002)
- Supreme Novices' Hurdle - (1) Menorah (2010)
- Arkle Challenge Trophy - (1) Captain Chris (2011)
- Baring Bingham Novices' Hurdle - (1) Massini's Maguire (2007)
- Triumph Hurdle - (3) Made in Japan (2004), Detroit City (2006), Defi du Seuil (2017)
- RSA Insurance Novices' Chase - (1) One Knight (2003)
- Champion Bumper - (1) Cheltenian (2011)
- Golden Miller Novices' Chase - (1) Defi du Seuil (2019)
- Coral Cup - (2) What's Up Boys (2000), Monkerhostin (2004)
- Glenfarclas Cross Country Chase - (2) Balthazar King (2012, 2014)
- County Handicap Hurdle - (1) Rooster Booster (2002)
- Centenary Novices' Handicap Chase - (1) Copper Bleu (2010)
- Pertemps Final - (1) Fingal Bay (2014)
- Johnny Henderson Grand Annual Chase - (1) Kibreet (1996)

== Major wins ==
(United Kingdom) Great Britain

- Tingle Creek Chase - (2) Flagship Uberalles (2001), Defi Du Seuil (2019)
- Henry VIII Novices' Chase - (1) Fair Along (2006)
- Finale Juvenile Hurdle - (1) Defi Du Seuil (2016)
- Challow Novices' Hurdle - (3) Bonanza Boy (1987). Fingal Bay (2012), Thyme Hill (2020)
- Kauto Star Novices' Chase - (1) Thyme Hill (2022)
- Clarence House Chase - (1) Defi Du Seuil (2020)
- Scilly Isles Novices' Chase - (2) Defi Du Seuil (2019), Sporting John (2021)
- Ascot Chase - (1) Captain Chris (2014)
- Manifesto Novices' Chase - (2) Wishfull Thinking (2011), Menorah (2012)
- Anniversary 4-Y-O Novices' Hurdle - (2) Detroit City (2006), Defi Du Seuil (2017)
- Top Novices' Hurdle - (3) Phardante Flyer (2000), Ilico II (2001), In Contrast (2002)
- Mildmay Novices' Chase - (1) What's Up Boys (2001)
- Liverpool Hurdle - (1) Thyme Hill (2021)

Welsh Grand National - Dream Alliance (2009)

(Republic of Ireland) Ireland

- Punchestown Gold Cup - (1) Planet of Sound (2010)
- Punchestown Champion Chase - (1) Flagship Uberalles (2003)
- Ryanair Novice Chase - (1) Captain Chris (2011)
