= Dan Skelton =

British racehorse trainer

Dan Skelton is a British horse trainer who trains racehorses that compete in National Hunt racing. Skelton is the son of British Olympic gold medallist Nick Skelton and the older brother of champion jockey Harry Skelton.

Skelton spent nine years working at the stables of Paul Nicholls and set up his own stables in 2013 in Warwickshire.

Skelton won his first British jump racing Champion Trainer's title in the 2025–26 season, becoming the first trainer to win more than £5 million prize money in a British National Hunt racing season.

== Cheltenham Festival winners (13) ==
- Golden Miller Novices' Chase - (1) Grey Dawning (2024)
- Ryanair Chase - (1) Protektorat (2024)
- Baring Bingham Novices' Hurdle - (1) The New Lion (2025)
- David Nicholson Mares' Hurdle - (1) Roksana (2019)
- County Handicap Hurdle - (4) Superb Story (2016), Mohaayed (2018), Ch'tibello (2019), Faivoir (2023)
- Coral Cup - (2) Langer Dan (2023, 2024)
- Johnny Henderson Grand Annual Chase - (1) Unexpected Party (2024)
- Sun Racing Plate Handicap Chase - (1) Madara (2026)
- Pertemps Final - (1) Supremely West (2026)

== Major wins ==
(United Kingdom) Great Britain

- Henry VIII Novices' Chase - (2) Allmankind (2020), L'Eau Du Sud (2024)
- Kauto Star Novices' Chase - (1) Shan Blue (2020)
- Finale Juvenile Hurdle - (1) Allmankind (2019)
- Maghull Novices' Chase - (1) Mirabad (2026)
- Manifesto Novices' Chase - (1) Protektorat (2021)
- Melling Chase - (1) Grey Dawning (2026)
- Betfair Chase - (3) Protektorat (2022), Grey Dawning (2025, 2026)
- Mersey Novices' Hurdle - (2) My Drogo (2021), Bossman Jack (2026)
- Challow Novices' Hurdle - (1) The New Lion (2024)
