= Paul Nicholls (horse racing) =

English horse trainer

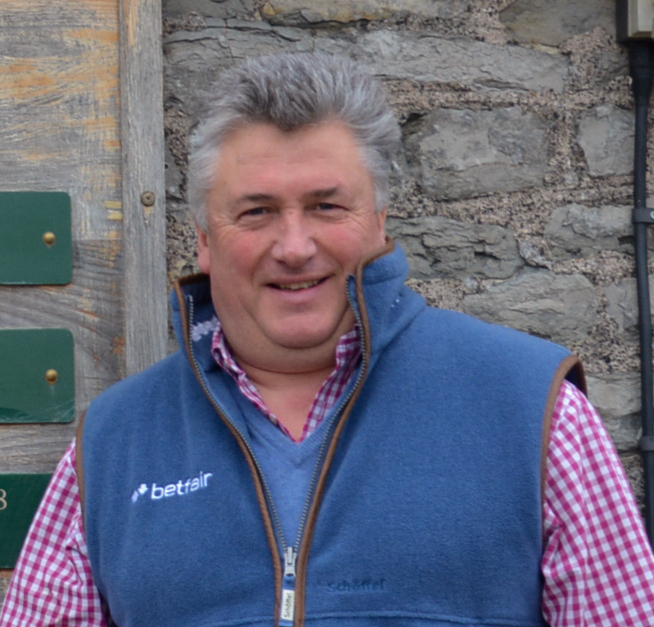
- Nicholls in 2017

Personal information
- Born: 17 April 1962 (age 64) Lydney, Gloucestershire
- Occupation: Trainer

Horse racing career
- Sport: Horse racing
- Career wins: As a National Hunt jockey: 133; As a National Hunt trainer: 3,931

Major racing wins
- As a National Hunt jockey: Hennessy Gold Cup (1986, 1987); Irish Hennessey Gold Cup (1988) As a trainer in UK National Hunt Grade Ones; Cheltenham Gold Cup (1999, 2007, 2008, 2009); King George VI Chase (1997, 1999, 2006 2007, 2008, 2009, 2011, 2013, 2014, 2018, 2019, 2020); Champion Hurdle (2012); Queen Mother Champion Chase (1999, 2004, 2008, 2009, 2015, 2020); World Hurdle (2009, 2010, 2011, 2012); Supreme Novices' Hurdle (2006, 2011); Triumph Hurdle (2008, 2011); Arkle Challenge Trophy (1999, 2003); RSA Chase (2006, 2007, 2019); Betfair Chase (2006, 2007, 2009, 2011, 2012, 2014); Challow Novices' Hurdle (2003, 2006, 2020, 2021); Ascot Chase (2000, 2008, 2016, 2019, 2024 ) Tolworth Hurdle (2003, 2006, 2007, 2008); Feltham Novices' Chase (1993, 2003, 2008, 2017); Tingle Creek Chase (1999, 2002, 2005, 2006, 2007, 2008, 2009, 2010, 2014, 2017, 2020); Long Walk Hurdle (2009, 2010, 2011); Victor Chandler Chase (1999, 2009, 2010, 2011, 2015); Melling Chase (2001, 2011, 2019); Betfred Bowl (2000, 2010, 2014, 2021); Anniversary 4-Y-O Novices' Hurdle (2011, 2021); Liverpool Hurdle (2009, 2010, 2011, 2012); Maghull Novices' Chase (1999, 2002, 2003, 2007, 2010, 2017, 2018); Henry VIII Novices' Chase (2011, 2013, 2014, 2018); Victor Chandler Chase (2009, 2010, 2011); Scilly Isles Novices' Chase (2006, 2007, 2008, 2009); Future Champion Novices' Chase (1994); Aintree Hurdle (2013); Sefton Novices' Hurdle (2022) As a trainer in Ireland National Hunt Grade Ones: Punchestown Gold Cup (2007, 2008, 2021); Irish Gold Cup (2009); Champion Four Year Old Hurdle (2003); Ryanair Novice Chase (2003); Punchestown Champion Chase (2008, 2009); John Durkan Memorial Punchestown Chase (2008); Lexus Chase (2007, 2009, 2012); Ladbrokes Champion Chase (2007, 2008, 2010, 2012, 2021) Other big race winners in Britain: Grand National (2012); Hennessy Gold Cup (2003, 2007, 2009); Welsh National (2004, 2005); Scottish Grand National (1997, 2016, 2017); Bet365 Gold Cup (2001, 2003, 2012, 2015); Paddy Power Gold Cup (2012, 2014); Fred Winter Juvenile Novices' Handicap Hurdle (2011, 2015, 2016); Jewson Novices' Handicap Chase (2009); Vincent O'Brien County Handicap Hurdle (2004, 2006, 2009, 2014); Festival Trophy Chase (2005, 2007, 2019); Grand Annual (2004, 2007, 2016, 2018) Christie's Foxhunter Chase (2004, 2005, 2017, 2018)

Racing awards
- British jump racing Champion Trainer (2005–06, 2006–07, 2007–08, 2008–09, 2009–10, 2010–11, 2011–12, 2013–14, 2014–15, 2015–16, 2018-19, 2020-21, 2021–22, 2022–23)

Significant horses
- Kauto Star, Denman, Big Buck's, Master Minded, See More Business, Thisthatandtother, Celestial Halo, Cenkos, What A Friend, Al Ferof, Neptune Collonges, Zarkandar, Noland, Twist Magic, Azertyuiop, Strong Flow, Call Equiname, Flagship Uberalles, Rock On Ruby, Silviniaco Conti, Rocky Creek, Caid Du Berlais, Chapoturgeon.

Paul Frank Nicholls OBE (born 17 April 1962) is a British National Hunt horse trainer with stables at Ditcheat, Somerset. A relatively successful jump jockey, Nicholls has become the leading National Hunt trainer of his generation in Britain, finishing the 2007–08 season with 155 winners and a record £4 million in prize money. In November 2026 Nicholls broke the record for most trained National Hunt winners in Britain and Ireland. As of November 2026, he has trained over 3,931 winners, won the 2012 Grand National, four Cheltenham Gold Cups and has been crowned British jump racing Champion Trainer fourteen times.

== Early life and education ==
The son of a policeman, Nicholls was educated at Marlwood School, Alveston before leaving at 16 to take up work in a local point-to-point yard.

== Jockey career ==
Nicholls turned conditional in 1982 under the tutelage of Josh Gifford before joining David Barons in 1985, and became stable jockey in 1986. It was with Barons that Nicholls was most closely associated during his riding career. The pair enjoyed numerous big race successes, including back-to-back wins in the Hennessy Gold Cup at Newbury with Broadheath in 1986 and Playschool the following year. Playschool also won the 1987 Welsh Grand National, and the 1988 Irish Hennessy Gold Cup with Nicholls. Playschool was subsequently made favourite for the 1988 Cheltenham Gold Cup but was pulled up before the 20th fence. Barons attributed Playschool's lacklustre performance to doping but his claims were never substantiated. Following a broken leg when kicked by a horse during pre-season training sustained in 1989, Nicholls retired from the saddle having ridden a respectable 133 winners during a seven-year career.

== Training career ==
Nicholls took out his trainer's licence in 1991, having served a two-year apprenticeship as assistant trainer to Barons which saw him assist in Seagram's winning Grand National attempt. In response to an advert placed in the Sporting Life, Nicholls began his training operation at Manor Farm, Ditcheat, in stables rented from local dairy farmer Paul Barber. Starting with just eight horses, his first winner soon followed, the appropriately named Olveston, owned by Nicholls' father and named after the South Gloucestershire village in which he was raised. A steady climb up the training ladder followed, with Nicholls' first grade one success coming with See More Indians in the Feltham Novices' Chase at Kempton in 1993.

However, it was the 1999 Cheltenham Festival that saw Nicholls' breakthrough into jump racing's elite, winning three of the most prestigious steeplechases in National Hunt racing. Nicholls enjoyed a memorable meeting, collecting the Queen Mother Champion Chase with Call Equiname, the Arkle Challenge Trophy with Flagship Uberalles, and the Gold Cup with See More Business. However, it was not until the end of the 2005–06 season, after seven years of filling the runners up spot that Nicholls was finally crowned Champion Trainer for the first time, his eventual coronation coming after a long struggle for supremacy with multiple champion Martin Pipe.

The appointment of the Irish rider Ruby Walsh as stable jockey strengthened Nicholls' hand in the big races. Their major successes include the Queen Mother Champion Chase with Azertyuiop (2004) and Master Minded (2008 and 2009), five wins in the King George VI Chase with Kauto Star (2006, 2007, 2008, 2009 and 2011) and the Cheltenham Gold Cup with Kauto Star in 2007 and 2009. Nicholls' finest hour came in the 2008 Cheltenham Gold Cup where he saddled the first three horses home: in finishing order, Denman (ridden by Sam Thomas), Kauto Star and Neptune Collonges. At the high of his stable stars' powers, Nicholls' dominance extended across the Irish Sea and his horses plundered Ireland's most valuable jumping prizes with increasing regularity.

In December 2008, Nicholls trained his 50th grade one winner when Master Minded (ridden by AP McCoy) won the Tingle Creek Chase at Sandown, and on 5 November 2011, Kauto Stone made Nicholls the fastest National Hunt trainer to reach 2000 winners.

Many equine stars have been nurtured by Nicholls and there are few top prizes to elude him, the two missing races from his UK portfolio were added in 2012 when Rock on Ruby won the Champion Hurdle and Neptune Collonges, ridden by Daryl Jacob, won the Grand National.

In April 2016, he won the champion trainer's title for the tenth time.

Nicholls was appointed Officer of the Order of the British Empire (OBE) in the 2020 New Year Honours for services to the horse racing industry.

== Personal life ==
Nicholls writes a column for Betfair and provides commentary on horse racing.

Away from racing, Nicholls has a keen interest in horticulture, particularly rose growing. He is also an avid supporter of Manchester United, whose long-time manager Sir Alex Ferguson has several horses in training with Nicholls.

In November 2009, Nicholls starred alongside Kauto Star in a short film to promote Somerset, commissioned by inward investment agency Into Somerset.

He has been married three times. He married Tarnya Davies in June 1987. He married Georgina Brown in Barbados in May 2011. The couple have two daughters, while Nicholls also has a daughter from his second marriage to Bridget and a son by a fourth relationship.

== Cheltenham winners (50) ==
- Cheltenham Gold Cup - (4) See More Business (1999), Kauto Star (2007, 2009), Denman (2008)
- Queen Mother Champion Chase - (6) Call Equiname (1999), Azertyuiop (2004), Master Minded (2008, 2009), Dodging Bullets (2015), Politologue (2020)
- Stayers' Hurdle - (4) Big Buck's (2009, 2010, 2011, 2012)
- Champion Hurdle - (1) Rock On Ruby (2012)
- Supreme Novices' Hurdle - (2) Noland (2006), Al Ferof (2011)
- Triumph Hurdle - (2) Celestial Halo (2008), Zarkandar (2011)
- Arkle Challenge Trophy - (2) Flagship Uberalles (1999), Azertyuiop (2003)
- Brown Advisory Novices' Chase - (3) Star de Mohaison (2006), Denman (2007), Topofthegame (2019)
- Golden Miller Novices' Chase - (2) Stage Star (2023), Caldwell Potter (2025)
- Ryanair Chase - (3) Thisthatandtother (2005), Taranis (2007), Frodon (2019)
- Centenary Novices' Handicap Chase - (1) Chapoturgeon (2009)
- Coral Cup - (1) Aux Ptits Soins (2015)
- Fred Winter Juvenile Novices' Handicap Hurdle - (3) Sanctuaire (2010), Qualando (2015), Diego du Charmil (2016)
- County Handicap Hurdle - (4) Sporazene (2004), Desert Quest (2006), American Trilogy (2009), Lac Fontana (2014)
- St James's Place Foxhunter Chase - (4) Earthmover (2004), Sleeping Night (2005), Pacha du Polder (2017, 2018)
- Johnny Henderson Grand Annual Chase - (4) St Pirran (2004), Andreas (2007), Solar Impulse (2016), Le Prezien (2018)
- Martin Pipe Conditional Jockeys' Handicap Hurdle - (2) Salubrious (2013), Ibis du Rheu (2016)
- Albert Bartlett Novices' Hurdle - (1) Stay Away Fay (2023)
- Pertemps Final - (1) Monmiral (2024)

== Major wins ==
(United Kingdom) Great Britain

- Grand National - (1) Neptune Collonges (2012)
- King George VI Chase - (13) See More Business (1997, 1999), Kauto Star (2006, 2007, 2008, 2009, 2011), Silviniaco Conti (2013, 2014), Clan Des Obeaux (2018, 2019), Frodon (2020), Bravemansgame (2022)
- Tingle Creek Chase - (12) Flagship Uberalles (1999), Cenkos (2002), Kauto Star (2005, 2006), Twist Magic (2007, 2009), Master Minded (2008, 2010), Dodging Bullets (2014), Politologue (2017, 2020), Greaneteen (2021)
- Betfair Chase - (6) Kauto Star (2006, 2007, 2009, 2011), Silviniaco Conti (2012, 2014)
- Henry VIII Novices' Chase - (7) Dines (1998), Thisthatandtother (2003), Marodima (2007), Al Ferof (2011), Hinterland (2013), Vibrato Valtat (2014), Dynamite Dollars (2018)
- Fighting Fifth Hurdle - (2) Irving (2014, 2016)
- Kauto Star Novices' Chase - (5) See More Indians (1993), Strong Flow (2003), Breedsbreeze (2008), Black Corton (2017), Bravemansgame (2021)
- Finale Juvenile Hurdle - (2) Adrien Du Pont (2015), Quel Destin (2018)
- Challow Novices' Hurdle - (7) Cornish Rebel (2004), Denman (2006), Bravemansgame (2020), Stage Star (2021), Hermes Allen (2022), Captain Teague (2023), No Drama This End (2025)
- Tolworth Novices' Hurdle - (5) Thisthatandtother (2003), Noland (2006), Silverburn (2007), Breedsbreeze (2008), Tahmuras (2023)
- Clarence House Chase - (5) Call Equiname (1999), Master Minded(2009, 2011), Twist Magic (2010), Dodging Bullets (2015)
- Ascot Chase - (6) Rockforce (2000), Kauto Star (2008), Silviniaco Conti (2016), Cyrname (2019), Pic D'Orhy (2024, 2025)
- Anniversary 4-Y-O Novices' Hurdle - (4) Le Duc (2003), Zarkandar (2011), All Yours (2015), Monmiral (2021)
- Betway Bowl - (6) See More Business (2000), What a Friend (2010), Silviniaco Conti (2014, 2015), Clan Des Obeaux (2021, 2022)
- Aintree Hurdle - (1) Zarkandar (2013)
- Top Novices' Hurdle - (1) Pierrot Lunaire (2008)
- Mildmay Novices' Chase - (4) Star de Mohaison (2006), Silviniaco Conti (2012), Saphir Du Rheu (2015), Caldwell Potter (2025)
- Melling Chase - (4) Fadalko (2001), Master Minded (2011), Politologue (2018), Pic D'Orhy (2023)
- Mersey Novices' Hurdle - (4) Garde Champetre (2004), Natal (2006), Elusive Dream (2008), Lac Fontana (2014)
- Maghull Novices' Chase - (9) Flagship Uberalles (1999), Armaturk (2002), Le Roi Miguel (2003), Twist Magic (2007), Tataniano (2010), San Benedeto (2017), Diego Du Charmil (2018), Kalif Du Berlais (2025)
- Liverpool Hurdle - (4) Big Buck's (2009, 2010, 2011, 2012)
- Celebration Chase - (7) Cenkos (2002, 2004), Andreas (2008), Twist Magic (2009), Sanctuaire (2012), Greaneteen (2021, 2022)
- Sefton Novices' Hurdle - (1) Gelino Bello (2022)

(Republic of Ireland) Ireland

- Irish Gold Cup - (1) Neptune Collonges (2009)
- Punchestown Gold Cup - (3) Neptune Collonges (2007, 2008), Clan des Obeaux (2021)
- Punchestown Champion Chase - (2) Twist Magic (2008), Master Minded (2009)
- Ladbrokes Champion Chase - (5) Taranis (2007), Kauto Star (2008, 2010), Kauto Stone (2012), Frodon (2021)
- John Durkan Memorial Punchestown Chase - (1) Noland (2008)
- Savills Chase - (3) Denman (2007), What a Friend (2009), Tidal Bay (2012)
- Ryanair Novice Chase - (1) Le Roi Miguel (2003)
- Champion Four Year Old Hurdle - (1) Sporazene (2003)

France

- Grande Course de Haies d'Auteuil - (1) Ptit Zig (2016)
- Prix Renaud du Vivier - (1) Ptit Zig (2013)
- Grand Prix d'Automne - (1) Zarkandar (2014)
