= European Breeders' Fund Novices' Handicap Hurdle Final =

Hurdle horse race in Britain

European Breeders' Fund Novices' Handicap Hurdle Final
2026
Scorpio Rising	Get On George	Gee Force Flyer

Previous years
2025
Laurens Bay	Off The Jury	Meetmebythesea
2024
Champagne Twist	Pic Roc	Emailandy
2023
Crambo	Inneston	Hugos New Horse
2022
Complete Unknown	Marble Sands	Dubrovnik Harry
2021
Beauport	Riggs	Gladiateur Allen

2020-2011
2020
Mcfabulous	Sevarano	Hurricane Harvey
2019
Third Wind	One For Rosie	Champagne Well
2018
Sam's Gunner	Dentley De Mee	First Assignment
2017
Minella Awards	Prime Venture	Wylde Magic
2016
Barney Dwan	Potters Legend	Alcala
2015
As De Mee	Great Try	Kilgeel Hill
2014
Brave Vic	Saffron Wells	Doctor Harper
2013
Close Touch	Many Clouds	Edmund Kean
2012
Ambion Wood	Carrigmorna King	Aikideau
2011
Skint	Mic's Delight	Occasionally Yours

2010-2001
2010
Red Harbour	Babysitter	Ranjobaie
2009
Big Eared Fran	Bakbenscher	What A Buzz
2008
Beshabar	Sovereign King	Tot O'Whiskey
2007
Albertas Run	Double Eagle	Red Scally
2006
Killaghy Castle	Sharajan	Yaboya
2005
Julius Caesar	Billyvoddan	Rebel Rhythm
2004
Control Man	Eric's Charm	Holland Park
2003
Tana River	Nonantais	Benbecula
2002
Latimer's Place	Hopbine	Sea Drifting
2001
Direct Access	Tyneandthyneagain	Concert Pianist

2000-1998
2000
Errand Boy	Behamore	Carryonharry
1999
Lordberniebouffant	Storm of Gold	Count Campioni
1998
Montroe	Red Curate	Racketball

The European Breeders Fund Novices' Handicap Hurdle Final is a Premier Handicap National Hunt hurdle race in Great Britain which is open to horses aged between four and seven. It is run at Sandown Park over a distance of about 2 miles and 4 furlongs (2 miles, 3 furlongs and 173 yards, or 3,980 metres), and during its running there are nine hurdles to be jumped. It is a handicap race for novices, and it is scheduled to take place each year in March. It is currently sponsored by Betfair. The race was first run in 1998.

The race is restricted to horses which have placed in the first four in a qualifying race during the current season. In 2022–23 there were 36 scheduled qualifiers between October and February. The race held Grade 3 status until 2022 and was reclassified as a Premier Handicap from the 2023 running when Grade 3 status was renamed by the British Horseracing Authority.

== Winners ==
- Weights given in stones and pounds.

Year	Winner	Age	Weight	Jockey	Trainer
1998	Montroe		11-02	D O'Sullivan	Richard Rowe
1999	Lordberniebouffant		10-05	Philip Hide	Josh Gifford
2000	Errand Boy		10–13	Seamus Durack	Sue Smith
2001	Direct Access	6	11-02	Tony Dobbin	Len Lungo
2002	Latimer's Place	6	10-03	Marcus Foley	Toby Balding
2003	Tana River	7	11–12	Barry Fenton	Emma Lavelle
2004	Control Man	6	10–11	Tony McCoy	Martin Pipe
2005	Julius Caesar	5	10–12	Graham Lee	Howard Johnson
2006	Killaghy Castle	6	11-07	Leighton Aspell	Nick Gifford
2007	Albertas Run	6	10-09	Tony McCoy	Jonjo O'Neill
2008	Beshabar	6	11-03	Daryl Jacob	Nick Williams
2009	Big Eared Fran	6	11-06	Andrew McNamara	David Pipe
2010	Red Harbour	6	10–11	Ruby Walsh	Paul Nicholls
2011	Skint	5	10–12	Barry Geraghty	Nicky Henderson
2012	Ambion Wood	6	11–12	Denis O'Regan	Victor Dartnall
2013	Close Touch	5	11-06	Barry Geraghty	Nicky Henderson
2014	Brave Vic	6	10–12	Joshua Moore	Gary Moore
2015	As De Mee	5	11-08	Sam Twiston-Davies	Paul Nicholls
2016	Barney Dwan	6	11-06	Paddy Brennan	Fergal O'Brien
2017	Minella Awards	6	11-08	Noel Fehily	Harry Fry
2018	Sam's Gunner	5	10-12	Will Kennedy	Michael Easterby
2019	Third Wind	5	11-05	Tom O'Brien	Hughie Morrison
2020	McFabulous	6	11-09	Harry Cobden	Paul Nicholls
2021	Beauport	5	10-12	Jordan Nailor	Nigel Twiston-Davies
2022	Complete Unknown	6	11–03	Lorcan Williams	Paul Nicholls
2023	Crambo	6	11–05	Conor Brace	Fergal O'Brien
2024	Champagne Twist	6	11–11	Ben Jones	Ben Pauling
2025	Laurens Bay	6	11–08	Gavin Sheehan	Jamie Snowden
2026	Scorpio Rising	6	11–11	Sean Bowen	Olly Murphy

== See also ==
- Horse racing in Great Britain
- List of British National Hunt races
