= Dorothy Paget Mares' Open National Hunt Flat Race =

National Hunt flat horse race in Britain

- Class: Listed
- Location: Cheltenham Racecourse; Cheltenham, England
- Race type: National Hunt flat race
- Sponsor: Karndean Designflooring
- Website: Cheltenham

Race information
- Distance: 2 miles 87 yards (3,298 metres)
- Surface: Turf
- Track: Left-handed
- Qualification: Four to five years old fillies & mares
- Weight: 11 st 2 lb Penalties; 4 lb for Class 1 winners
- Purse: £25,000 (2025); 1st: £14,860

Dorothy Paget Mares Open NH Flat Race
2026
Elegantemente	Eastern Whisper	Soleretta

Previous years
2025
Celestial Tune	Shotgun Shirley	Divine Diva
2024
Seo Linn	Siog Geal	Strong Run
2023
Baby Kate	Jeune Belle	Micks Jet
2022
Queens Gamble	Bonttay	Fortuna Ligna
2021
Bonttay	Leading Theatre	Code Name Lise

2020-2013
2020
Elle Est Belle	Ishkhara Lady	Jersey Lady
2019
Urban Artist	Legends Ryde	Lady In Hiding
2018
The Glancing Queen	Mega Yeats	Royal Illusion
2017
Posh Trish	Grageelagh Girl	Pineapple Rush
2016
Irish Roe	My Khaleesi	Naranja
2015
Copper Kay	Which One Is Which	Theatre Territory
2014
Bitofapuzzle	Montana Belle	Daring Carlotta
2013
The Govaness	Lily Waugh	Legacy Gold

The Dorothy Paget Mares' Open National Hunt Flat Race is a Listed National Hunt flat race in Great Britain which is open to fillies and mares aged four or five years. It is run on the Old Course at Cheltenham over a distance of about 2 miles and ½ furlong (2 miles and 87 yards, or 3,298 m), and it is scheduled to take place each year in November. The race has been run under various names since its inception but finally gained its registered name in 2026, honouring prolific racehorse owner Dorothy Paget. Prior to 2023 the race was also open to six-year-olds.

== Winners ==
Year	Winner	Age	Jockey	Trainer
2013	The Govaness	4	Paddy Brennan	Fergal O'Brien
2014	Bitofapuzzle	6	Noel Fehily	Harry Fry
2015	Copper Kay	5	Richard Johnson	Philip Hobbs
2016 (dh)	My Khaleesi; Irish Roe	5; 5	Wayne Hutchinson; Graham Lee	Alan King; Peter Atkinson
2017	Posh Trish	4	Harry Cobden	Paul Nicholls
2018	The Glancing Queen	4	Wayne Hutchinson	Alan King
2019	Urban Artist	4	Nico de Boinville	Hughie Morrison
2020 (dh)	Elle Est Belle; Ishkhara Lady	4; 6	Harry Skelton; Sean Bowen	Dan Skelton; Harry Fry
2021	Bonttay	4	Paddy Brennan	Fergal O'Brien
2022	Queens Gamble	4	Jonathan Burke	Oliver Sherwood
2023	Baby Kate	4	Brian Hayes	Willie Mullins
2024	Seo Linn	4	Billy Lee	Paddy Twomey
2025	Celestial Tune	4	Sean Bowen	Thomas Cooper
2026	Elegantemente	4	John Gleeson	Henry de Bromhead

== See also ==
- Horse racing in Great Britain
- List of British National Hunt races
