= Jane Seymour Mares' Novices' Hurdle =

Hurdle horse race in Britain

- Class: Grade 2
- Location: Sandown Park Racecourse; Esher, England
- Race type: Hurdle
- Website: Sandown Park

Race information
- Distance: 2m 3f 173y (3,980 metres)
- Surface: Turf
- Track: Right-handed
- Qualification: Four-years-old and up fillies and mares
- Weight: 10 st 6 lb (4yo); 11 st 2 lb (5yo+); Penalties; 5 lb for Class 1 weight-for-age hurdle winners 3 lb for Class 2 w-f-a or Class 1 handicap hurdle winners
- Purse: £22,500 (2021); 1st: £12,814

Jane Seymour Mares' Novices' Hurdle
2026
| Kingston Queen | White Noise | A Path To Ronda |

Previous years
2025
Hollygrove Cha Cha | That'll Do Moss | Blue Las
2024
Springtime Promise | Cherie D'am | Smiling Getaway
2023
You Wear It Well | She's A Saint | Deeply Superficial
2022
Love Envoi | Speech Bubble | Nina The Terrier
2021
Anythingforlove | Sandymount Rose | Misty Whisky

2020-2013
2020
Emmas Joy | Flow Away | Vienna Court
2019
Queenohearts | Danse Idol | Papagana
2018
Midnight Tune | If You Say Run | Sensulano
2017
Colin's Sister | Happy Diva | Ms Parfois
2016
Jessber's Dream | Katie Too | Actinpieces
2015
Uranna | Rons Dream | Queen Of The Stage
2014
Tagrita | Cannon Fodder | Molly's A Diva
2013
Utopie Des Bordes | She Ranks Me | Toubeera

The Jane Seymour Mares' Novices' Hurdle is a Grade 2 National Hunt hurdle race in Great Britain which is open to mares aged four years or older. It is run at Sandown Park over a distance of about 2 miles and 4 furlongs (2 miles 3 furlongs and 173 yards or 3,980 metres) and during the race there are nine hurdles to be jumped. The race is scheduled to take place each year in February.

The race was first run in 2013 as a Listed race and was upgraded to Grade 2 status in 2016.

== Winners ==
| Year | Winner | Age | Jockey | Trainer |
|---|---|---|---|---|
| 2013 | Utopie Des Bordes | 5 | Barry Geraghty | Nicky Henderson |
| 2014 (Note: The 2014 race took place at Wincanton after the original fixture was abandoned) | Tagrita | 6 | Daryl Jacob | Paul Nicholls |
| 2015 | Uranna | 7 | Ruby Walsh | Willie Mullins |
| 2016 | Jessber's Dream | 6 | Noel Fehily | Harry Fry |
| 2017 | Colin's Sister | 6 | Paddy Brennan | Fergal O'Brien |
| 2018 | Midnight Tune | 7 | Aidan Coleman | Anthony Honeyball |
| 2019 | Queenohearts | 6 | Ciaran Gethings | Stuart Edmunds |
| 2020 (Note: The 2020 race took place at Warwick after the original fixture was abandoned) | Emmas Joy | 7 | Harry Skelton | Dan Skelton |
| 2021 | Anythingforlove | 6 | Page Fuller | Jamie Snowden |
| 2022 | Love Envoi | 6 | Jonathan Burke | Harry Fry |
| 2023 | You Wear It Well | 6 | Gavin Sheehan | Jamie Snowden |
| 2024 | Springtime Promise | 7 | Connor Brace | Fergal O'Brien |
| 2025 | Hollygrove Cha Cha | 5 | Gavin Sheehan | Jamie Snowden |
| 2026 (Note: The 2026 race took place at Warwick after the original fixture was abandoned) | Kingston Queen | 6 | Conor O'Farrell | David Pipe |

== See also ==
- Horse racing in Great Britain
- List of British National Hunt races
