= List of British National Hunt races =

A list of notable National Hunt horse races which take place annually in Great Britain, under the authority of the British Horseracing Authority, including all races which currently hold Grade 1, 2, Premier Handicap or Listed status, with distances shown in miles and furlongs (rounded to the nearest half-furlong). Horses' names which are in italics are the winners of that race in the previous season.

== History of the National Hunt Pattern ==
A National Hunt (NH) Pattern of important races was first recognized in 1964 when the Horserace Betting Levy Board made a grant of £64,000 to fund a "prestige race allocation" split between the Cheltenham Gold Cup, Champion Hurdle and Grand National. In 1968 a Jump Racing Pattern Committee headed by Lord Leverhulme recommended the creation of a formal NH Pattern, which came into being in 1969 with 14 races initially. The Pattern underwent further revisions in the 1980s and was subject to a major change in 1989 when the Jockey Club, the governing body of British horseracing at the time, overhauled the Pattern to create a mid-season and season-ending Grade 1 race in each of twelve categories, with lead-up Grade 2 races and a set of 14 major handicaps of Grade 3 status. This forms the basis of the current Pattern, which has since been subject to further changes in status and number of races, most recently for the 2023–24 season. Major changes took place in the 2022–23 season when the Grade 3 handicaps were renamed Premier Handicaps and Listed handicaps were removed from the pattern, either becoming Premier Handicaps or being downgraded to Class 2 status.

== Grade 1 ==
Month	Race name	Type	Racecourse	Distance	Age/Sex	2026–27 winner
November	Lancashire Chase	Chase	Haydock	3m 1½f	5yo+	Grey Dawning
November	Fighting Fifth Hurdle	Hurdle	Newcastle	2m 1f	4yo+
December	Henry VIII Novices' Chase	Chase	Sandown	1m 7½f	4yo+
December	Tingle Creek Chase	Chase	Sandown	1m 7½f	4yo+
December	Long Walk Hurdle	Hurdle	Ascot	3m ½f	4yo+
December	Formby Novices' Hurdle	Hurdle	Aintree	2m 1f	3yo+	Idaho Sun
December	Christmas Hurdle	Hurdle	Kempton	2m	4yo+	Sir Gino
December	King George VI Chase	Chase	Kempton	3m	4yo+	The Jukebox Man
December	Kauto Star Novices' Chase	Chase	Kempton	3m	4yo+	Kitzbuhel
December	Challow Novices' Hurdle	Hurdle	Newbury	2m 4½f	4yo+	No Drama This End
January	Clarence House Chase	Chase	Ascot	2m 1f	5yo+	Jonbon
February	Scilly Isles Novices' Chase	Chase	Sandown	2m 4f	5yo+	Sixmilebridge
February	Ascot Chase	Chase	Ascot	2m 5f	5yo+	Jonbon
March	Supreme Novices' Hurdle	Hurdle	Cheltenham	2m ½f	4yo+	Old Park Star
March	Arkle Challenge Trophy	Chase	Cheltenham	2m	5yo+	Kargese
March	Champion Hurdle	Hurdle	Cheltenham	2m ½f	4yo+	Lossiemouth
March	Baring Bingham Novices' Hurdle	Hurdle	Cheltenham	2m 5f	4yo+	King Rasko Grey
March	Broadway Novices' Chase	Chase	Cheltenham	3m 1f	5yo+	Kitzbuhel
March	Queen Mother Champion Chase	Chase	Cheltenham	2m	5yo+	Il Etait Temps
March	Champion Bumper	Flat	Cheltenham	2m ½f	4–6yo	The Mourne Rambler
March	David Nicholson Mares' Hurdle	Hurdle	Cheltenham	2m 4½f	4yo+ m	Wodhooh
March	Stayers' Hurdle	Hurdle	Cheltenham	3m	4yo+	Home By The Lee
March	Festival Trophy	Chase	Cheltenham	2m 4½f	5yo+	Heart Wood
March	Triumph Hurdle	Hurdle	Cheltenham	2m 1f	4yo	Apolon De Charnie
March	Spa Novices' Hurdle	Hurdle	Cheltenham	3m	5yo+	Johnny's Jury
March	Cheltenham Gold Cup	Chase	Cheltenham	3m 2½f	5yo+	Gaelic Warrior
April	Anniversary 4-Y-O Juvenile Hurdle	Hurdle	Aintree	2m 1f	4yo	Mange Tout
April	Manifesto Novices' Chase	Chase	Aintree	2m 4f	5yo+	Koktail Divin
April	Aintree Bowl	Chase	Aintree	3m 1f	5yo+	Jango Baie
April	Aintree Hurdle	Hurdle	Aintree	2m 4f	4yo+	Brighterdaysahead
April	Mildmay Novices' Chase	Chase	Aintree	3m 1f	5yo+	Gold Dancer
April	Top Novices' Hurdle	Hurdle	Aintree	2m ½f	4yo+	Storming George
April	Melling Chase	Chase	Aintree	2m 4f	5yo+	Grey Dawning
April	Sefton Novices' Hurdle	Hurdle	Aintree	3m ½f	4yo+	Zeus Power
April	Maghull Novices' Chase	Chase	Aintree	2m	5yo+	Mirabad
April	Mersey Novices' Hurdle	Hurdle	Aintree	2m 4f	4yo+	Bossman Jack
April	Liverpool Hurdle	Hurdle	Aintree	3m ½f	4yo+	Home By The Lee
April	Celebration Chase	Chase	Sandown	2m	5yo+	Edwardstone

== Grade 2 ==
Month	Race name	Type	Racecourse	Distance	Age/Sex	2026–27 winner
October	Persian War Novices' Hurdle	Hurdle	Chepstow	2m 3½f	4yo+	West Hill Verde
October	Sharp Novices' Hurdle	Hurdle	Cheltenham	2m ½f	4yo+	Kingofthefrontier
October	Old Roan Chase	Chase	Aintree	2m 4f	4yo+	abandoned
October	West Yorkshire Hurdle	Hurdle	Wetherby	3m	4yo+	Strong Leader
October	Charlie Hall Chase	Chase	Wetherby	3m	5yo+	Pic D'Orhy
November	Haldon Gold Cup	Chase	Exeter (Note: Run at Aintree over 2m in 2026 due to the Exeter fixture being cancelled due to firm ground)	2m 1½f	4yo+	Rubaud
November	Molyneux Hurdle	Hurdle	Aintree	2m 1f	4yo+	Alexei
November	Rising Stars Novices' Chase	Chase	Wincanton (Note: Run at Aintree in 2026 due to the Wincanton fixture being cancelled due to firm ground)	2m 4f	4yo+	Taurus Bay
November	Cheltenham Chase	Chase	Cheltenham	2m	4yo+	Jonbon
November	Hyde Novices' Hurdle	Hurdle	Cheltenham	2m 5f	4yo+	Lock Stock
November	Prestbury Juvenile Hurdle	Hurdle	Cheltenham	2m ½f	3yo	Atomic City
November	November Novices' Chase	Chase	Cheltenham	2m	4yo+	Passing Diamond
November	1965 Chase	Chase	Ascot	2m 5f	4yo+	Blow Your Wad
November	Newton Novices' Hurdle	Hurdle	Haydock	1m 7½f	4yo+	Kingofthefrontier
November	Ascot Hurdle	Hurdle	Ascot	2m 3½f	4yo+	Kateira
November	John Francome Novices' Chase	Chase	Newbury	2m 4f	4yo+
November	Long Distance Hurdle	Hurdle	Newbury	3m ½f	4yo+
December	Winter Novices' Hurdle	Hurdle	Sandown	2m 4f	4yo+
December	Esher Novices' Chase	Chase	Sandown	3m	4yo+
December	Peterborough Chase	Chase	Huntingdon	2m 4f	4yo+
December	Bristol Novices' Hurdle	Hurdle	Cheltenham	3m	4yo+
December	Noel Novices' Chase	Chase	Ascot	2m 3f	4yo+
December	Wayward Lad Novices' Chase	Chase	Kempton	2m	4yo+	Mambonumberfive
December	Desert Orchid Handicap Chase	Chase	Kempton	2m	4yo+	Thistle Ask
December	Finale Juvenile Hurdle	Hurdle	Chepstow	2m	3yo	Tenter Le Tout
December	Yorkshire Silver Vase Mares' Chase	Chase	Doncaster	2m 4½f	4yo+ m	Spindleberry
January	Relkeel Hurdle	Hurdle	Cheltenham	2m 4½f	4yo+	Kabral Du Mathan
January	Silviniaco Conti Chase	Chase	Kempton	2m 4½f	5yo+	Edwardstone
January	Hampton Novices' Chase	Chase	Warwick	3m	5yo+	Salver (Note: Run at Windsor in 2026 after the original Warwick fixture was abandoned)
January	Lightning Novices' Chase	Chase	Windsor	2m	5yo+	No Questions Asked
January	Warfield Mares' Hurdle	Hurdle	Ascot	1m 7½f	4yo+ m	Ooh Betty
January	Rossington Main Novices' Hurdle	Hurdle	Haydock	1m 7½f	4yo+	Old Park Star
January	Finesse Juvenile Hurdle	Hurdle	Cheltenham	2m 1f	4yo	Maestro Conti
January	Cotswold Chase	Chase	Cheltenham	3m 1½f	5yo+	Spillane's Tower
January	International Hurdle	Hurdle	Cheltenham	2m 1f	4yo+	The New Lion
January	Cleeve Hurdle	Hurdle	Cheltenham	3m	5yo+	Ma Shantou
January	Classic Novices' Hurdle	Hurdle	Cheltenham	2m 4½f	4yo+	Kripticjim
January	Yorkshire Rose Mares' Hurdle	Hurdle	Doncaster	3m ½f	4yo+ m	Feet Of A Dancer
January	River Don Novices' Hurdle	Hurdle	Doncaster	3m ½f	4yo+	Thedeviluno
February	Kingmaker Novices' Chase	Chase	Warwick	2m	5yo+	Steel Ally
February	Denman Chase	Chase	Newbury	2m 7½f	5yo+	Haiti Couleurs
February	Game Spirit Chase	Chase	Newbury	2m ½f	5yo+	Lulamba
February	Jane Seymour Mares' Novices' Hurdle	Hurdle	Sandown	2m 4f	4yo+ m	Kingston Queen (Note: Run at Warwick in 2026 after the original Sandown fixture was abandoned)
February	Reynoldstown Novices' Chase	Chase	Ascot	3m	5yo+	The Jukebox Kid
February	Rendlesham Hurdle	Hurdle	Haydock	3m ½f	4yo+	Lud'or
February	Prestige Novices' Hurdle	Hurdle	Haydock	3m ½f	4yo+	Dalston Lad
February	Kingwell Hurdle	Hurdle	Wincanton	1m 7f	4yo+	Alexei
February	Pendil Novices' Chase	Chase	Kempton	2m 4½f	5yo+	Jax Junior
February	Adonis Juvenile Hurdle	Hurdle	Kempton	2m	4yo	La Luna Artista
February	Dovecote Novices' Hurdle	Hurdle	Kempton	2m	4yo+	Klub De Reve
February	National Spirit Hurdle	Hurdle	Fontwell	2m 3f	4yo+	Potters Charm
March	Premier Novices' Hurdle	Hurdle	Kelso	2m 2f	4yo+	Montemares
March	Dawn Run Mares' Novices' Hurdle	Hurdle	Cheltenham	2m 1f	4yo+ m	White Noise
March	Golden Miller Novices' Limited Handicap Chase	Chase	Cheltenham	2m 4½f	5yo+	Meetmebythesea
March	Liberthine Mares' Chase	Chase	Cheltenham	2m 4½f	4yo+ m	Dinoblue
March	British EBF 'National Hunt' Mares' Novices' Limited Handicap Hurdle	Hurdle	Newbury	2m 4½f	4yo+ m	Charisma Cat
April	Nickel Coin Mares' Standard Open National Hunt Flat Race	Flat	Aintree	2m 1f	4–6yo m	Nan's Choice
April	Weatherbys nhstallions.co.uk Standard Open NH Flat Race	Flat	Aintree	2m 1f	4–6yo	Forthfactor
April	Silver Trophy Handicap Chase	Chase	Cheltenham	2m 4½f	5yo+	Riskintheground (Note: Run at Haydock in 2026 after the original Cheltenham fixture was abandoned)
April	Fair Maid Of Perth Mares' Chase	Chase	Perth	3m	5yo+ m	Apple Away
April	Oaksey Chase	Chase	Sandown	2m 6½f	5yo+	Doyen Quest
April	Select Hurdle	Hurdle	Sandown	2m 5½f	4yo+	Jingko Blue

== Premier Handicaps ==
Month	Race name	Type	Racecourse	Distance	Value £K	Age	2026–27 winner
May	Swinton Handicap Hurdle	Hurdle	Haydock	1m 7½f	80	4yo+	Moon Chime
July	Summer Plate	Chase	Market Rasen	2m 5½f	100	4yo+	Queensbury Boy
October	Silver Trophy Handicap Hurdle	Hurdle	Chepstow	2m 3½f	75	4yo+	Daylatedollarshort
October	Crossley Handicap Chase	Chase	Wetherby	2m 3½f	75	4yo+	Crebilly
October	Regal Encore Handicap Chase	Chase	Ascot	3m	100	4yo+	Viroflay
November	Badger Beers Handicap Chase	Chase	Wincanton (Note: Run at Aintree in 2026 due to the Wincanton fixture being cancelled due to firm ground)	3m 1f	80	4yo+	Montregard
November	William Holman Gold Cup	Chase	Cheltenham	2m 4f	160	4yo+	Meetmebythesea
November	Tom Olliver Handicap Chase	Chase	Cheltenham	3m 3½f	80	4yo+	Holokea
November	Greatwood Hurdle	Hurdle	Cheltenham	2m ½f	100	3yo+	Pioneer Pete
November	Red Rose Handicap Hurdle	Hurdle	Haydock	3m ½f	100	4yo+	Matty's Getaway
November	Hurst Park Chase	Chase	Ascot	2m 1f	100	4yo+	Vanderpoel
November	Rehearsal Handicap Chase	Chase	Newcastle	3m	80	4yo+
November	Gerry Feilden Intermediate Hurdle	Hurdle	Newbury	2m ½f	75	4yo+
November	Newbury Gold Cup	Chase	Newbury	3m 2f	250	4yo+
December	Becher Chase	Chase	Aintree	3m 2f	150	6yo+
December	Tradesmen's Plate Handicap Hurdle	Hurdle	Kelso	2m 5f	80	4yo+
December	George Stevens Handicap Chase	Chase	Cheltenham	3m 2½f	80	4yo+
December	December Gold Cup	Chase	Cheltenham	2m 4½f	125	4yo+
December	Ascot Silver Cup	Chase	Ascot	3m	100	4yo+
December	Ascot Rotary Club Festive Handicap Hurdle	Hurdle	Ascot	1m 7½f	125	3yo+
December	Rowland Meyrick Handicap Chase	Chase	Wetherby	3m	75	4yo+	Konfusion
December	Welsh Grand National	Chase	Chepstow	3m 6½f	175	4yo+	Haiti Couleurs
January	New Year's Day Handicap Chase	Chase	Cheltenham	2m 4½f	100	5yo+	Matata
January	Lanzarote Hurdle	Hurdle	Kempton	2m 5f	100	4yo+	Iberico Lord
January	Classic Chase	Chase	Warwick	3m 5f	100	5yo+	abandoned in 2026
January	Peter Marsh Chase	Chase	Haydock	3m 1½f	100	5yo+	Imperial Saint
January	Betfair Exchange Handicap Chase	Chase	Cheltenham	2m 4½f	100	5yo+	Donnacha
January	Great Yorkshire Chase	Chase	Doncaster	3m	100	5yo+	Dartmoor Pirate
February	Heroes Handicap Hurdle	Hurdle	Sandown	2m 7½f	100	4yo+	Henri The Second
February	Wolsey Handicap Chase	Chase	Sandown	2m	???	5yo+	new race
February	William Hill Hurdle	Hurdle	Newbury	2m ½f	155	4yo+	Tutti Quanti
February	Swinley Chase	Chase	Ascot	3m	100	5yo+	Montregard
February	Grand National Trial	Chase	Haydock	3m 4½f	100	5yo+	Grand Geste
February	Ladbrokes Trophy Handicap Chase	Chase	Kempton	3m	150	5yo+	Lookaway
March	Greatwood Gold Cup	Chase	Newbury	2m 4f	100	5yo+	Heltenham
March	Morebattle Hurdle	Hurdle	Kelso	2m 2f	120	4yo+	Captain Hugo
March	Imperial Cup	Hurdle	Sandown	2m	100	4yo+	Mondo Man
March	EBF 'National Hunt' Novices' Handicap Hurdle Final	Hurdle	Sandown	2m 4f	80	4–7yo	Scorpio Rising
March	Fred Winter Juvenile Handicap Hurdle	Hurdle	Cheltenham	2m ½f	80	4yo	Saratoga
March	1911 Handicap Chase	Chase	Cheltenham	3m 1f	150	5yo+	Johnnywho
March	Sun Racing Plate Handicap Chase	Chase	Cheltenham	2m 4f	150	5yo+	Madara
March	Olympian Cup	Hurdle	Cheltenham	2m 5f	110	4yo+	Jingko Blue
March	Johnny Henderson Grand Annual Chase	Chase	Cheltenham	2m	150	5yo+	Martator
March	George Duller Pertemps Final	Hurdle	Cheltenham	3m	110	5yo+	Supremely West
March	County Handicap Hurdle	Hurdle	Cheltenham	2m 1f	110	5yo+	Wilful
March	Midlands Grand National	Chase	Uttoxeter	4m 2f	160	5yo+	Isaac Des Obeaux
April	Red Rum Handicap Chase	Chase	Aintree	2m	100	5yo+	Ryan's Rocket
April	Orrell Park Handicap Hurdle	Hurdle	Aintree	2m 4f	75	4yo+	Wellington Arch
April	Topham Chase	Chase	Aintree	2m 5f	150	5yo+	Will The Wise
April	Bridle Road Handicap Hurdle	Hurdle	Aintree	3m ½f	75	4yo+	Wade Out
April	Freebooter Handicap Chase	Chase	Aintree	3m 1f	100	5yo+	Mr Hope Street
April	Grand National	Chase	Aintree	4m 2½f	1000	7yo+	I Am Maximus
April	Mysilv Fillies' Juvenile Handicap Hurdle	Hurdle	Cheltenham	2m 1f	50	4yo f	Queen Maeve (Note: Run at Sandown in 2026 after the original Cheltenham fixture was abandoned)
April	Book Summer Plate Ladies Day Today Mares' Novice Handicap Chase	Chase	Cheltenham	2m 4½f	50	5yo+ m	Bluey (Note: Run at Market Rasen in 2026 after the original Cheltenham fixture was abandoned)
April	Ayrshire Champion Handicap Chase	Chase	Ayr	2m ½f	75	5yo+	Moudan
April	Scottish Champion Hurdle	Hurdle	Ayr	2m	100	4yo+	Dedicated Hero
April	Scottish Grand National	Chase	Ayr	4m	200	5yo+	Kap Vert
April	bet365 Gold Cup	Chase	Sandown	3m 4½f	175	5yo+	Havaila

== Listed ==
Month	Race name	Type	Racecourse	Distance	Age/Sex	2026–27 winner
October	Robert Mottram Memorial Novices' Chase	Chase	Chepstow (Note: Run at Ffos Las in 2026 due to steeplechases at the Chepstow fixture being cancelled due to firm ground)	2m 3½f	4yo+	Captain Teague
October	Panoramic Hurdle	Hurdle	Kempton (Note: Run at Carlisle over 2m 1f in 2026 due to the Kempton fixture being cancelled due to firm ground)	2m	4yo+	Wilful
October	Wensleydale Juvenile Hurdle	Hurdle	Wetherby	2m	3yo	Charles Darnay
October	Montagu Mares' Hurdle	Hurdle	Wetherby	2m	4yo+ m	Kateira
November	Houghton Mares' Chase	Chase	Carlisle	2m 4f	4yo+ m	Obsessedwithyou
November	Colin Parker Memorial Intermediate Chase	Chase	Carlisle	2m 4f	4yo+	Wendigo
November	Richard Aston Memorial Mares' Novices' Chase	Chase	Bangor	2m 1½f	4yo+ m	Getawhisky
November	Doctor Fothergill Novices' Chase	Chase	Cheltenham	3m 1f	4yo+	D Art D Art
November	Dorothy Paget Mares' Open National Hunt Flat Race	Flat	Cheltenham	2m ½f	4–5yo m	Elegantemente
November	William Kidd Open National Hunt Flat Race	Flat	Cheltenham	2m ½f	4–5yo	Dundee Law
November	Lilies Mares' Hurdle	Hurdle	Kempton	2m 5f	4yo+ m
November	Bud Booth Mares' Chase	Chase	Market Rasen	3m	4yo+ m
November	Coral Daily Rewards Shaker Fillies' Juvenile Hurdle	Hurdle	Newbury	2m ½f	3yo f
November	Play Coral Racing-Super-Series Mares' Novices' Hurdle	Hurdle	Newbury	2m ½f	4yo+ m
December	Claremont Novices' Hurdle	Hurdle	Sandown	2m	4yo+
December	Wirral Juvenile Hurdle	Hurdle	Aintree	2m 1f	3yo
December	Henrietta Knight Mares' Open National Hunt Flat Race	Flat	Huntingdon	2m	4–5yo m
December	Lady Godiva Mares' Novices' Chase	Chase	Warwick	2m 4f	4yo+ m
December	Doncaster Mansion House Mares' Hurdle	Hurdle	Doncaster	3m ½f	4yo+ m
December	Scudamore Open National Hunt Flat Race	Flat	Ascot	1m 7½f	4–5yo
December	Abram Mares' Novices' Hurdle	Hurdle	Haydock	2m 3f	4yo+ m
December	Golden Ace Mares' Novices' Hurdle	Hurdle	Taunton	2m ½f	3yo+ m	St Irene
January	Adam Lindsay Gordon Juvenile National Hunt Flat Race	Flat	Cheltenham	2m 1f	4yo	Solly's Gold
January	Anne Boleyn Mares' Hurdle	Hurdle	Sandown	2m 4f	4yo+ m	Nurse Susan
January	Berrymoss Novices' Chase	Chase	Kelso	2m 4f	5yo+	abandoned
January	Alder Demain & Akers Mares' Chase	Chase	Newbury	2m 7½f	5yo+ m	Panic Attack
January	Alan Swinbank Mares' National Hunt Flat Race	Flat	Market Rasen	2m ½f	4-6yo m	Malina Road
January	Round Tower Mares' Novices' Hurdle	Hurdle	Windsor	2m	4yo+	Getawhisky
January	Sir Nigel Gresley Fillies' Juvenile Hurdle	Hurdle	Doncaster	2m ½f	4yo f	Manganese
February	Scottish Triumph Hurdle	Hurdle	Musselburgh	1m 7½f	4yo	Made U Blush
February	Lady Protectress Mares' Chase	Chase	Huntingdon	2m 4f	5yo+ m	Jasmine Bliss
February	Sidney Banks Memorial Novices' Hurdle	Hurdle	Huntingdon	2m 3½f	4yo+	Act Of Innocence
February	Beacons Bumper	Flat	Newbury	2m ½f	4-6yo	A Likeable Rogue
February	Warwick Mares' Hurdle	Hurdle	Warwick	2m 5f	4yo+ m	Hollygrove Cha Cha
February	Agatha Christie Mares' Novices' Chase	Chase	Exeter	2m 1½f	5yo+ m	Queens Gamble (Note: Run at Wincanton in 2026 after the original Exeter fixture was abandoned)
February	Dr Hennis Novices' Hurdle	Hurdle	Exeter	2m ½f	4yo+	abandoned
February	Merry Monarch Mares' Chase	Chase	Exeter	3m	5yo+ m	Blue Las
March	Premier Chase	Chase	Kelso	2m 7½f	5yo+	Protektorat
March	Rose Hill Mares' Novices' Hurdle	Hurdle	Doncaster	3m ½f	5yo+ m	Park Princess
March	Elmbridge Mares' Standard Open NHF Race	Flat	Sandown	2m	4-6yo m	Ti'mamzel
March	Beeswing Mares' Hurdle	Hurdle	Kelso	3m 2f	5yo+ m	World Of Fortunes
April	Fortescue-Thomas Mares' Novices' Hurdle	Hurdle	Cheltenham	2m 4½f	4yo+ m	Dream Shadow (Note: Run at Haydock in 2026 after the original Cheltenham fixture was abandoned)
April	Gold Castle 'National Hunt' Novices' Hurdle	Hurdle	Perth	3m	5yo+	No Drama This End

== Conditions, novices, juveniles & sales ==
Criteria for inclusion;

- Class 2 conditions, novice or juvenile races worth £50,000 or more, or £40,000 or more and are of historical importance.
- Any sales race.
- Other conditions, novice or juvenile races with a linked article.

Month	Race name	Type	Racecourse	Status	Distance	Class	Value £K	Age	2026–27 winner
October	Masterson Holdings Hurdle	Hurdle	Cheltenham	Conditions	2m ½f	2	40	4yo	North Shore
November	"Future Star" Silver Bowl Novices' Chase	Chase	Exeter (Note: Run at Aintree in 2026 due to the Exeter fixture being cancelled due to firm ground)	Novice	3m 1f	2	40	4yo+	Royal Infantry
November	Weatherbys nhstallions.co.uk Graduation Chase	Chase	Carlisle	Conditions	2m	2	50	4yo+	Cristal d'Estruval
November	Betfair Exchange Graduation Chase	Chase	Haydock	Conditions	2m 5½f	2	50	4yo+	Koktail Divin
January	Weatherbys Cheltenham Festival Betting Guide Hurdle	Hurdle	Windsor	Conditions	2m 4f	2	100	5yo+	Potters Charm
January	Fleur De Lys Chase	Chase	Windsor	Conditions	2m 6f	2	165	5yo+	Protektorat
January	Grand Military Gold Cup	Chase	Sandown	Conditions	3m	3	17.5	6yo+	abandoned
February	Royal Artillery Gold Cup	Chase	Sandown	Conditions	3m	3	17.5	6yo+	abandoned
February	Victor Ludorum Juvenile Hurdle	Hurdle	Haydock	Juvenile	1m 7½f	2	20	4yo	Manlaga
March	Goffs Hundred Grand Bumper	Flat	Newbury	Sales	2m ½f	2	100	4-5yo	Lady Hope

== Other selected handicaps ==
Criteria for inclusion;

- Class 2 or Class 3 races worth £50,000 or more run between mid-October and the end of the season, or £40,000 or more between the start of the season and mid-October.
- Races worth £34,000 or more which are a course's most important race of the season or which have historical importance.
- All Class 2 or Class 3 Regional Grand National races, and any Cross-Country race.
- Other handicap races with a linked article.

Month	Race name	Type	Racecourse	Distance	Class	Value £K	Age	2026–27 winner
May	Staffordshire Plate	Chase	Uttoxeter	3m	2	35	5yo+	Joyeux Machin
May	Norfolk National	Chase	Fakenham	3m 5f	3	25	5yo+	Tommie Beau
May	Fakenham Grand Prix Handicap Hurdle	Hurdle	Fakenham	2m 4f	2	50	4yo+	Rialannah
May	Pertemps Network Long Distance Handicap Hurdle	Hurdle	Haydock	3m ½f	2	40	4yo+	Matty's Getaway
May	Clarke Chase	Chase	Uttoxeter	2m 4f	2	50	5yo+	Glengouly
June	Perth Gold Cup	Chase	Perth	3m	2	34	5yo+	Riskintheground
June	Summer Cup	Chase	Uttoxeter	3m	2	75	5yo+	Imperial Alex
June	Oakmere Homes Handicap Hurdle	Hurdle	Cartmel	2m 1f	2	43	4yo+	Filibustering
June	Oakmere Homes Handicap Chase	Chase	Cartmel	2m 5f	2	43	5yo+	Breizh River
July	Summer Handicap Hurdle	Hurdle	Market Rasen	2m ½f	2	60	3yo+	High Fibre
September	ARC Summer Chase Series Final Handicap Chase	Chase	Worcester	2m 4f	2	50	4yo+	Pep Talking
September	Fixed Brush Hurdle Series Final Novices' Handicap Hurdle	Hurdle	Worcester	2m 4f	2	70	3yo+	Lock Stock
September	Lincoln Handicap Hurdle	Hurdle	Market Rasen	2m ½f	2	35	3yo+	Un Sens A La Vie
October	Simply Ned Handicap Chase	Chase	Kelso	2m 1f	2	40	4yo+	Breaking Cover
October	Welsh Champion Hurdle	Hurdle	Chepstow	2m	2	50	5yo+	Pioneer Pete
October	Native River Handicap Chase	Chase	Chepstow (Note: Run at Ffos Las over 3m in 2026 due to steeplechases at the Chepstow fixture being cancelled due to firm ground)	2m 7½f	2	50	4yo+	Ballycamus
October	Durham National	Chase	Sedgefield	3m 5f	2	27.5	4yo+	Passengerontheship
October	squareintheair.com Handicap Chase	Chase	Cheltenham	2m	2	100	4yo+	JPR One
October	William Hill Best Odds Guaranteed Handicap Chase	Chase	Cheltenham	3m 1f	2	100	4yo+	Here Comes Georgie
October	Edinburgh Gin Chase	Chase	Kelso	3m 2f	2	40	4yo+	Myretown
October	Sodexo Live! Handicap Chase	Chase	Ascot	2m 1f	2	100	4yo+	Vanderpoel
October	Lavazza Handicap Hurdle	Hurdle	Ascot	1m 7½f	2	60	3yo+	Trustintimes
November	Southern Cranes Handicap Hurdle	Hurdle	Plumpton	2m 4½f	2	55	3yo+	Ike Sport
November	Weatherbys And Birdie Calendars Handicap Chase	Chase	Bangor	3m	2	40	4yo+	First Confession
November	Glenfarclas Cross Country Handicap Chase	Chase	Cheltenham (Note: Will be run on Trials Day in January 2027 due to firm ground on the cross country track)	3m 5f	2	35	5yo+
November	Southern National	Chase	Fontwell	3m 3½f	3	22	4yo+	Livin On Luco
November	Best Odds On The Betfair Exchange Handicap Hurdle	Hurdle	Haydock	2m 3f	2	50	4yo+	Kocktail Bleu
November	Berkshire National	Chase	Ascot	3m 5½f	2	75	5yo+	Brandt
November	Betfair Backs Opinions Handicap Chase	Chase	Haydock	3m 1½f	2	50	4yo+	Chasingouttheblues
November	Coral "Bet £10 Get £50 Sign Up Offer" Handicap Chase	Chase	Newbury	2m 4f	2	55	4yo+
November	Sir Peter O'Sullevan Memorial Handicap Chase	Chase	Newbury	2m 6½f	2	50	4yo+
November	Jim Joel Memorial Trophy	Chase	Newbury	2m ½f	3	50	4yo+
December	Grand Sefton Chase	Chase	Aintree	2m 5f	2	100	6yo+
December	Betfair Backs Opinions Handicap Hurdle	Hurdle	Sandown	2m	2	50	3yo+
December	London National	Chase	Sandown	3m 4½f	2	50	5yo+
December	Scottish Borders National	Chase	Kelso	4m ½f	3	50	4yo+
December	Richard Landale Handicap Chase	Chase	Kelso	2m 1f	2	70	4yo+
December	Glenfarclas Crystal Cup Cross Country Handicap Chase	Chase	Cheltenham	3m 5f	2	40	5yo+
December	Pennine Handicap Chase	Chase	Doncaster	3m	2	50	4yo+
December	Each Way Extra At bet365 Handicap Hurdle	Hurdle	Doncaster	2m ½f	2	50	3yo+
December	Tommy Whittle Chase	Chase	Haydock	3m 1½f	2	50	4yo+
December	Lincolnshire National	Chase	Market Rasen	3m 3½f	3	20	4yo+
December	Ladbrokes 'Big Football Bet Builder Boosts' Handicap Chase	Chase	Kempton	3m	3	50	4yo+
December	Castleford Chase	Chase	Wetherby	1m 7f	2	30	4yo+
December	Ladbrokes 'Best Odds Guaranteed In Racing' Handicap Hurdle	Hurdle	Kempton	2m 5f	2	70	3yo+
December	Mandarin Handicap Chase	Chase	Newbury	3m 2f	2	50	4yo+
January	Betfair Handicap Chase	Chase	Cheltenham	3m 1½f	2	50	5yo+
January	Auld Reekie Handicap Chase	Chase	Musselburgh	2m 4½f	2	50	5yo+
January	New Year's Day Handicap Hurdle	Hurdle	Windsor	2m 4f	2	100	4yo+
January	Stayers' Veterans' Handicap Chase Series Final	Chase	Sandown	3m	2	100	10yo+
January	Sussex Stayers Hurdle	Hurdle	Plumpton	3m 1f	2	50	4yo+
January	Sussex National	Chase	Plumpton	3m 4½f	2	50	5yo+
January	North Yorkshire National	Chase	Catterick	3m 6f	3	20	5yo+
January	1461 Handicap Chase	Chase	Wetherby	2m 3½f	2	50	5yo+
January	Somerset National	Chase	Wincanton	3m 2½f	3	23.7	5yo+
January	Sovereign Handicap Hurdle	Hurdle	Windsor	2m	2	110	4yo+
January	Berkshire Winter million Mares' Handicap Chase	Chase	Windsor	2m 4f	2	60	5yo+ m
January	bet365 Handicap Chase	Chase	Ascot	2m 5f	2	100	5yo+
January	Holloway's Hurdle	Hurdle	Ascot	2m 3½f	2	30	4yo+
January	Great Park Handicap Chase	Chase	Windsor	2m	2	50	5yo+
January	Weatherbys Racing Bank Handicap Hurdle	Hurdle	Windsor	3m	2	65	4yo+
January	Queen Boudica Series Final Mares' Handicap Chase	Chase	Fakenham	2m 5f	2	50	5yo+ m
January	Surrey National	Chase	Lingfield	3m 5f	3	30	5yo+
January	Timeform Novices' Handicap Chase	Chase	Cheltenham	2m 4½f	2	40	5yo+
January	Virgin Bet Supports Safe Gambling Handicap Chase	Chase	Doncaster	2m ½f	2	50	5yo+
February	Virgin Bet Every Saturday Money Back Handicap Chase	Chase	Sandown	1m 7½f	2	50	5yo+
February	Masters Handicap Chase	Chase	Sandown	3m	2	50	5yo+
February	Scottish County Hurdle	Hurdle	Musselburgh	1m 7½f	2	40	4yo+
February	Scottish Champion Chase	Chase	Musselburgh	2m 4½f	2	75	5yo+
February	Edinburgh National	Chase	Musselburgh	3m 7½f	2	60	5yo+
February	Portman Cup	Chase	Taunton	3m 4½f	2	40	5yo+
February	Betfair Exchange Handicap Hurdle	Hurdle	Ascot	2m 3½f	2	50	4yo+
February	Devon National	Chase	Exeter	3m 6½f	3	25	5yo+
February	Eider Chase	Chase	Newcastle	3m 6f	2	80	5yo+
March	Geoffrey Gilbey Trophy	Chase	Newbury	2m ½f	3	20	5yo+
March	Grimthorpe Handicap Chase	Chase	Doncaster	3m 2f	2	70	5yo+
March	Princess Royal National Hunt Novices' Handicap Chase	Chase	Cheltenham	3m 6f	2	100	5yo+
March	Glenfarclas Cross Country Limited Handicap Chase	Chase	Cheltenham	3m 5½f	2	75	5yo+
March	Fulke Walwyn Kim Muir Challenge Cup	Chase	Cheltenham	3m 2½f	2	75	5yo+
March	Martin Pipe Conditional Jockeys' Handicap Hurdle	Hurdle	Cheltenham	2m 4½f	2	75	4yo+
March	JenningsBet Novices' Handicap Chase	Chase	Uttoxeter	3m	2	50	5yo+
March	JenningsBet Handicap Hurdle	Hurdle	Uttoxeter	2m 7½f	2	100	4yo+
March	Virgin Bet Daily Extra Places Handicap Chase	Chase	Kempton	2m 4½f	2	60	5yo+
March	Herring Queen Series Final Mares' Novices' Hcap Hurdle	Hurdle	Kelso	2m	2	100	4yo+ m
April	Challenger Two Mile Handicap Hurdle Final	Hurdle	Haydock	1m 7½f	2	40	4yo+
April	Challenger Stayers Handicap Hurdle Final	Hurdle	Haydock	3m ½f	2	40	4yo+
April	Middle Distance Veterans' Handicap Chase Series Final	Chase	Haydock	2m 4f	2	100	10yo+
April	Sussex Champion Hurdle	Hurdle	Plumpton	2m	2	65	4yo+
April	Sussex Champion Chase	Chase	Plumpton	2m 1f	2	65	5yo+
April	Debenhams Handicap Hurdle (Conditional/Amateurs)	Hurdle	Aintree	2m ½f	2	50	4yo+
April	Challenger Mares' Handicap Chase Final	Chase	Cheltenham	3m 1½f	2	50	5yo+ m
April	Challenger Mares' Handicap Hurdle Final	Hurdle	Cheltenham	2m 4½f	2	50	4yo+ m
April	Hillhouse Quarry Handicap Chase	Chase	Ayr	2m 4½f	2	50	5yo+
April	CPMS Novices' Champion Handicap Chase	Chase	Ayr	3m	2	50	5yo+
April	Seafield Trophy Mares' Handicap Hurdle	Hurdle	Ayr	3m ½f	2	45	4yo+ m
April	Highland National	Chase	Perth	3m 6½f	3	30	5yo+
April	Novices' Championship Final Handicap Hurdle	Hurdle	Sandown	2m	2	100	4yo+
April	Josh Gifford Novices' Handicap Chase	Hurdle	Sandown	2m 4f	2	40	5yo+
April	bet365 Handicap Hurdle	Hurdle	Sandown	2m 4f	2	35	4yo+

== Hunter Chase Triple Crown ==
Month	Race name	Racecourse	Distance	Age	2027 winner
March	St James's Place Festival Challenge Cup Hunters' Chase	Cheltenham	3m 2½f	5yo+	Barton Snow
April	Foxhunters' Open Hunters' Chase	Aintree	2m 5f	6yo+	Barton Snow
May	Stratford Foxhunters' Champion Hunters' Chase	Stratford	3m 3½f	5yo+	abandoned
