= Orrell Park Handicap Hurdle =

Hurdle horse race in Britain

Orrell Park Handicap Hurdle
2026
Wellington Arch	Ike Sport	Favour And Fortune

Previous years
2025
Wellington Arch	Kopeck De Mee	Favour And Fortune
2024
Kateira	Jango Baie	Inthewaterside
2023
Fennor Cross	Buddy One	Sonigino
2022
Langer Dan	Fils D'oudairies	Balco Coastal
2021
Tronador	Dans Le Vent	Edwardstone

2020-2010
2019
Three Musketeers	Point Of Principle	Canardier
2018
Jester Jet	Eaton Hill	Who Dares Wins
2017
Rather Be	Dream Berry	Geordie Des Champs
2016
Party Rock	Champagne at Tara	Starchitect
2015
Theinval	The Saint James	Daneking
2014
Clondaw Kaempfer	Caid Du Berlais	Cash And Go
2013
Minella Forfitness	Clerk's Choice	Meister Eckhart
2012
Attaglance	Tour D'argent	Los Nadis
2011
Russian War	Reindeer Dippin	Wyse Hill Teabags

2010-2001
2010
Sir Harry Ormesher	Black Jack Blues	Pistolet Noir
2009
Sunnyhillboy	Prince Taime	Bedlam Boy
2008
Auroras Encore	I'm So Lucky	Ring The Boss
2007
Two Miles West	Gods Token	Shatabdi
2006
Strangely Brown	Saltango	Penny Pictures
2005
Genghis	Tamarinbleu	Mirpour
2004
Zibeline	Unleash	Redemption
2003
Patriot Games	Gralmano	Canada
2002
Ravenswood	Farinel	Indalo
2001
Crazy Horse	Doctor Goddard	Ask The Natives

2000-1991
2000
Quakers Field	Auetaler	Grecian Dart
1999
Khayrawani	Outset	Sadler's Realm
1998
Khayrawani	Cadougold	Fen Terrier
1997
Cadougold	Sheriffmuir	Ambleside
1996
Outset	Sohrab	Down The Fell
1995
Squire Silk	Taroudant	Lucky Blue
1994
Kadi	Zamirah	Lynch Law
1993
Gallateen	Olympian	Welshman
1992
Ninepins	Welshman	Dara Doone
1991
Trefelyn Cone	Torwada	Southover Lad

1990-1989
1990
Sayparee	Out Of Range	Artful Abbot
1989
Hill Street	Highland Bounty	Bonne Arme

The Orrell Park Handicap Hurdle is a Premier Handicap National Hunt handicap hurdle race in England which is open to horses aged four years or older. It is run at Aintree over a distance of about 2 miles and 4 furlongs (4,023 metres), and it is scheduled to take place each year in April. The prize fund is £75,000.

The race was first run in 1989 and was awarded Grade 3 status in 2014. It was re-classified as a Premier Handicap from the 2023 running when Grade 3 status was renamed by the British Horseracing Authority. It was sponsored by Oddbins from 1991 to 2002 and has had various sponsors since then, including bookmaker William Hill. The race gained its registered title in September 2026.

== Winners ==
Year	Winner	Age	Weight	Jockey	Trainer
1989	Hill Street	7	10-05	Mark Dwyer	Jimmy FitzGerald
1990	Sayparee	5	11-03	Peter Scudamore	Martin Pipe
1991	Trefelyn Cone	7	10-05	Peter Scudamore	Martin Pipe
1992	Ninepins	5	10-04	Charlie Swan	Arthur Moore
1993	Gallateen	5	10–11	Neale Doughty	Gordon W. Richards
1994	Kadi	5	11-07	Adrian Maguire	David Nicholson
1995	Squire Silk	6	11-00	Simon McNeill	Andy Turnell
1996	Outset	6	10-01	Chris Bonner (Note: amateur jockey)	Micky Hammond
1997	Cadougold	6	10-04	Charlie Swan	Martin Pipe
1998	Khayrawani	6	10–10	Fran Berry	Christy Roche
1999	Khayrawani	7	11-07	Fran Berry	Christy Roche
2000	Quakers Field	7	10-05	Mattie Batchelor	Gary Moore
2001	Crazy Horse	8	11–10	Tony Dobbin	Len Lungo
2002	Ravenswood	5	10-05	Tom Scudamore	Martin Pipe
2003	Patriot Games	9	10–04	Charlie Swan	Charlie Swan
2004	Zibeline	7	10-06	Graham Lee	Brian Ellison
2005	Genghis	6	10–13	Tony McCoy	Peter Bowen
2006	Strangely Brown	5	11-05	Brian Byrnes	Eric McNamara
2007	Two Miles West	6	10-07	Noel Fehily	Jonjo O'Neill
2008	Auroras Encore	6	10–12	Tjade Collier	Sue Smith
2009	Sunnyhillboy	6	11-00	Tony McCoy	Jonjo O'Neill
2010	Sir Harry Ormesher	7	11-01	Robert Thornton	Alan King
2011	Russian War	8	10-01	Paul Carberry	Gordon Elliott
2012	Attaglance	6	11–12	Harry Haynes	Malcolm Jefferson
2013	Minella Forfitness	6	10-03	David Bass	Nicky Henderson
2014	Clondaw Kaempfer	6	11-04	Wayne Hutchinson	Donald McCain
2015	Theinval	5	11-04	Jeremiah McGrath	Nicky Henderson
2016	Party Rock	9	10-08	Sean Quinlan	Jennie Candlish
2017	Rather Be	6	11-02	Jeremiah McGrath	Nicky Henderson
2018	Jester Jet	8	10-09	Robert Dunne	Tom Lacey
2019	Three Musketeers	9	10-05	Jack Kennedy	Gordon Elliott
	no race 2020 (Note: The 2020 running was cancelled because of the COVID-19 pandemic in the United Kingdom)
2021	Tronador	5	10-04	Jack Kennedy	Denise Foster
2022	Langer Dan	6	11-01	Harry Skelton	Dan Skelton
2023	Fennor Cross	6	11-01	Ben Harvey	John McConnell
2024	Kateira	7	11-05	Harry Skelton	Dan Skelton
2025	Wellington Arch	6	10-06	Jonjo O'Neill Jr	Jonjo O'Neill
2026	Wellington Arch	7	11-11	Jonjo O'Neill Jr	Jonjo & AJ O'Neill

== See also ==
- Horse racing in Great Britain
- List of British National Hunt races
