= Churchill Road Hurdle =

National Hunt hurdle race in Great Britain

The Churchill Road Hurdle was a Grade 2 National Hunt hurdle race in Great Britain which was open to horses aged four years or older. It was run at Lingfield Park over a distance of about 2 miles and 3½ furlongs (3,923 metres), and during its running there were ten hurdles to be jumped. It was a limited handicap race, and it took place in January 2006.

The equivalent event in the present National Hunt calendar is the Holloway's Hurdle at Ascot.

== Winner ==
- Weights given in stones and pounds.

Year	Winner	Age	Weight	Jockey	Trainer
2006	Dom d'Orgeval	6	10-11	Tony McCoy	Nick Williams

== See also ==
- Horseracing in Great Britain
- List of British National Hunt races
