= Lilies Mares' Hurdle =

Hurdle horse race in Britain

- Class: Listed
- Location: Kempton Park; Kempton, England
- Race type: Hurdle race
- Sponsor: Copybet
- Website: Kempton Park

Race information
- Distance: 2m 5f (4,224m)
- Surface: Turf
- Track: Right-handed
- Qualification: Four-years-old and up fillies & mares
- Weight: 10 st 13 lb (4yo); 11 st 0 (5yo+)
- Purse: £25,000 (2025); 1st: £14,238

Lilies Mares' Hurdle
2025
Dream On Baby	Bethpage	Della Casa Lunga

Previous years
2024
Kateira	Della Casa Lunga	Pawapuri
2023
Coquelicot	Kateira	Martha Brae
2022
Miranda	Martello Sky	Molly Ollys Wishes
2021
My Sister Sarah	Dragon Bones	Midnightreflection

2020-2011
2020
Bannixtown Glory	Getaway Totherock	Indefatigable
2019
Papagana	Culture De Sivola	Fleur Irlandaise
2018
Mia's Storm	If You Say Run	Culture De Sivola
2017
La Bague Au Roi	Jer's Girl	Midnight Tour
2016
Surtee Du Berlais	Rons Dream	Run Ructions Run
2015
Morello Royale	Polly Peachum	Fairytale Theatre
2014
Carole's Spirit	Clara Mc Cloud	L'unique
2013
Highland Retreat	Weather Babe	Ma Filleule
2012
Knockfierna	Miss Milborne	Alpine Breeze
2011
Whoops A Daisy	Cloudy Spirit	Violin Davis

2010-2007
2010
Carole's Legacy	Banjaxed Girl	Santera
2009
Whiteoak	Amber Brook	Wychwoods Legend
2008
One Gulp	Amber Brook	Blaeberry
2007
Refinement	Kruguyrova	Gaspara

The Lilies Mares' Hurdle is a Listed National Hunt hurdle race in Great Britain which is open to mares aged four years or older. It is run at Kempton over a distance of about 2 miles and 5 furlongs (4,224 metres), and during its running there are ten hurdles to be jumped. The race is scheduled to take place each year in November.

First run in 2007, the Lilies Mares' Hurdle was won by Refinement who was trained by Jonjo O'Neill and ridden by AP McCoy. The race, originally called Friends of Nigel Clark Mares' Only Hurdle, was set up in memory of the course's steward Nigel Clark. Since 2008 the race has had a number of sponsors including Starlight Children's Foundation, Ladbrokes and Coolmore Stud until 2012 when OLBG.com became the race sponsors and the race became known as the OLBG Mares' Hurdle. Copybet have sponsored the race since 2025. Prior to 2024 it was run over 3 miles and half a furlong. It was given the registered title of the Lilies Mares' Hurdle in 2026.

The Lilies Mares' Hurdle was the second race of the OLBG Mares' Road to Cheltenham, a series set up to help improve the quality of mares in National Hunt Racing.

== Records ==
Most successful horse:

- no horse has won this race more than once

Leading jockey (2 wins):

- Barry Geraghty - Carole's Legacy (2010), Whoops A Daisy (2011)
- Leighton Aspell - Surtee Du Berlais (2016), Papagana (2019)

Leading trainer (2 wins):

- Nicky Henderson - Carole's Legacy (2010), Whoops A Daisy (2011)
- Oliver Sherwood - Surtee Du Berlais (2016), Papagana (2019)
- Donald McCain - Whiteoak (2009), Bannixtown Glory (2020)

== Winners ==
Year	Winner	Age	Jockey	Trainer
2007	Refinement	8	Tony McCoy	Jonjo O'Neill
2008	One Gulp	5	Dominic Elsworth	Paul Webber
2009	Whiteoak	6	Jason Maguire	Donald McCain
2010	Carole's Legacy	6	Barry Geraghty	Nicky Henderson
2011	Whoops A Daisy	5	Barry Geraghty	Nicky Henderson
2012	Knockfierna	7	Davy Russell	Charles Byrnes
2013	Highland Retreat	6	Noel Fehily	Harry Fry
2014	Carole's Spirit	6	Daryl Jacob	Robert Walford
2015	Morello Royale	5	Aidan Coleman	Colin Tizzard
2016	Surtee Du Berlais	6	Leighton Aspell	Oliver Sherwood
2017	La Bague Au Roi	6	Richard Johnson	Warren Greatrex
2018	Mia's Storm	8	Wayne Hutchinson	Alan King
2019	Papagana	6	Leighton Aspell	Oliver Sherwood
2020	Bannixtown Glory	6	David Bass	Donald McCain
2021	My Sister Sarah	7	Nico de Boinville	Willie Mullins
2022	Miranda	7	Harry Cobden	Paul Nicholls
2023	Coquelicot	7	Rex Dingle	Anthony Honeyball
2024	Kateira	7	Harry Skelton	Dan Skelton
2025	Dream On Baby	5	Donagh Meyler	Emmet Mullins

== See also ==
- Horse racing in Great Britain
- List of British National Hunt races
