= Nickel Coin Mares' Standard Open NH Flat Race =

National Hunt flat horse race in Britain

- Class: Grade 2
- Location: Aintree Racecourse; Merseyside, England
- Race type: National Hunt flat race
- Sponsor: Goffs
- Website: Aintree

Race information
- Distance: 2m 209y (3,410 metres)
- Surface: Turf
- Track: Left-handed
- Qualification: Four to six years old fillies & mares
- Weight: 10 st 6 lb (4yo); 11 st 0 lb (5–6yo); Penalties; 4 lb for Grade 1 or Grade 2 winners
- Purse: £50,000 (2022); 1st: £28,135

Nickel Coin Mares' NH Flat Race
2026
Nan's Choice	Lennon Grove	Fairy Park

Previous years
2025
Seo Linn	La Conquiere	Kingston Queen
2024
Diva Luna	Jubilee Alpha	La Marquise
2023
Dysart Enos	Golden Ace	Williamstowndancer
2022
Ashroe Diamond	Law Ella	Lutinebella
2021
Me Too Please	Elle Est Belle	Miss Lamb

2020-2011
2019
The Glancing Queen	Minella Melody	Daylight Katie
2018
Getaway Katie Mai	Midnightreferendum	Duhallow Gesture
2017
Dame Rose	Oscar Rose	Petticoat Tails
2016
Kayf Grace	Augusta Kate	Shattered Love
2015
Hollies Pearl	Chocca Wocca	Sea Pride
2014
Avispa	Lady Buttons	Tara Mist
2013
Legacy Gold	Cailin Annamh	Carole's Spirit
2012
Eleven Fifty Nine	Call Me A Star	Umadachar
2011
Tempest River	Ceol Rua	Big Time Billy

2010-2008
2010
Big Time Billy	Dare To Doubt	Style Of Campile
2009
Candy Creek	Liss Na Tintri	Morning Supreme
2008
Carole's Legacy	Divali Princess	Call Me A Legend

The Nickel Coin Mares' Standard Open NH Flat Race is a Grade 2 National Hunt flat race in Great Britain which is open to fillies and mares aged four to six years. It is run at Aintree over a distance of about 2 miles and 1 furlong (2 miles and 209 yards, or 3,410 metres), and it is scheduled to take place each year during the Grand National meeting in early April.

The race is named after Nickel Coin, the winner of the 1951 Grand National and the most recent mare to win the Grand National. The race was first run in 2005 with Listed status, then was promoted to Grade 2 in 2016.

== Records ==
Leading jockey (2 wins):

- Robert Thornton - Senorita Rumbalita (2005), Avispa (2014)
- Ruby Walsh – Rhacophorus (2006), Candy Creek (2009)

Leading trainer (3 wins):

- Alan King – Senorita Rumbalita (2005), Avispa (2014), The Glancing Queen (2019)

== Winners ==
Year	Winner	Age	Jockey	Trainer
2005	Senorita Rumbalita	4	Robert Thornton	Alan King
2006	Rhacophorus	5	Ruby Walsh	Chris Down
2007	Turbo Linn	4	Tony Dobbin	Alan Swinbank
2008	Carole's Legacy	4	Andrew Tinkler	Nicky Henderson
2009	Candy Creek	5	Ruby Walsh	John Kiely
2010	Big Time Billy	4	Michael Byrne (Note: amateur jockey)	Peter Bowen
2011	Tempest River	5	Daryl Jacob	Ben Case
2012	Eleven Fifty Nine	6	Rachael Green	Anthony Honeyball
2013	Legacy Gold	5	Stephen Crawford	Stuart Crawford
2014	Avispa	5	Robert Thornton	Alan King
2015	Hollies Pearl	5	Sean Bowen	Peter Bowen
2016	Kayf Grace	6	Nico de Boinville	Nicky Henderson
2017	Dame Rose	4	Alain Cawley	Richard Hobson
2018	Getaway Katie Mai	5	Jamie Codd	John Queally
2019	The Glancing Queen	5	Wayne Hutchinson	Alan King
	no race 2020 (Note: The 2020 running was cancelled because of the COVID-19 pandemic in the United Kingdom)
2021	Me Too Please	5	Rachael Blackmore	Arthur Moore
2022	Ashroe Diamond	5	Patrick Mullins	Willie Mullins
2023	Dysart Enos	5	Paddy Brennan	Fergal O'Brien
2024	Diva Luna	5	Kielan Woods	Ben Pauling
2025	Seo Linn	5	Billy Lee	Paddy Twomey
2026	Nan's Choice	5	Harry Skelton	Dan Skelton

== See also ==
- Horse racing in Great Britain
- List of British National Hunt races
