= Mysilv Fillies' Juvenile Handicap Hurdle =

Hurdle horse race in Britain

Mysilv Fillies' Juvenile Handicap Hurdle
2026
Queen Maeve	Made U Blush	La Luna Artista

Previous years
2025
Lagoon Nebula	Clotilda	Maxios Prime
2024
Emotivo	Dameofthecotswolds	Majestic Jameela
2023
Under Control	Pretending	Media Naranja
2022
Malakahna	La Renommee	Addosh
2021
Her Indoors	Scholastic	Raffles Gitane

2018-2019
2019
Havingagoodtime	Via Delle Volte	So Enjoy
2018
Stylish Dancer	Cubswin	Hillcrest Fire

The Mysilv Fillies' Juvenile Handicap Hurdle is a Premier Handicap National Hunt hurdle race in Great Britain which is open to fillies aged four years. It is run on the New Course at Cheltenham over a distance of about 2 miles and 1 furlong (2 miles and 179 yards, or 3,382 metres), and during its running there are eight hurdles to be jumped. It is a handicap race for juvenile novice hurdlers, and it is scheduled to take place each year during April.

The race was first run in 2018 and was raised to Grade 3 in 2019.

== Winners ==
Year	Winner	Weight	Jockey	Trainer
2018	Stylish Dancer	10-09	Harry Skelton	Dan Skelton
2019	Havingagoodtime	11-10	Rachael Blackmore	Henry de Bromhead
	no race 2020 (Note: The 2020 running was cancelled because of the COVID-19 pandemic in the United Kingdom)
2021	Her Indoors	11-06	Adrian Heskin	Alan King
2022	Malakahna	11-07	Charlie Todd	Ian Williams
2023	Under Control	11-11	Nico de Boinville	Nicky Henderson
2024	Emotivo	10-13	Darragh O'Keeffe	Henry de Bromhead
2025	Lagoon Nebula	10-05	Sean O'Keeffe	Andrew Kinirons
2026 (Note: Run at Sandown due to drainage issues at Cheltenham)	Queen Maeve	10-05	Tristan Durrell	Dan Skelton

== See also ==
- Horse racing in Great Britain
- List of British National Hunt races
