= Formby Novices' Hurdle =

Hurdle horse race in Britain

- Class: Grade 1
- Location: Aintree Racecourse, England
- Race type: Hurdle race
- Sponsor: William Hill
- Website: Aintree

Race information
- Distance: 2m 209y (3,410 metres)
- Surface: Turf
- Track: Left-handed
- Qualification: Three-years-old and up
- Weight: 10 st 7 lb (3yo); 11 st 8 lb (4yo+); Allowances; 7 lb for fillies and mares
- Purse: £100,000 (2025); 1st: £56,950

Formby Novices' Hurdle
2025
Idaho Sun	Mydaddypaddy	The Last Cloud

Previous years
2024
Potters Charm	Miami Magic	Good And Clever
2023 (Dec)
Jango Baie	Favour And Fortune	Cannock Park
2023 (Jan)
Tahmuras	L'astroboy	Nemean Lion
2022
Constitution Hill	Jetoile	Mr Glass
2021
Metier	Shakem Up'arry	Tile Tapper

2020-2011
2020
Fiddlerontheroof	Jeremys Flame	Son Of Camas
2019
Elixir De Nutz	Grand Sancy	Southfield Stone
2018
Summerville Boy	Kalashnikov	Mont Des Avaloirs
2017
Finian's Oscar	Capitaine	Chalonnial
2016
Yorkhill	O O Seven	Agrapart
2015
L'ami Serge	Jolly's Cracked It	Thelordbewithyou
2014
Royal Boy	Josses Hill	Upazo
2013
Melodic Rendezvous	Pendra	Royal Boy
2012
Captain Conan	Colour Squadron	Magnifique Etoile
2011
Minella Class	Megastar	Toubab

2010-2001
2008
Breedsbreeze	Deep Purple	Calgary Bay
2007
Silverburn	Perce Rock	Astarador
2006
Noland	Whispered Promises	Albarino
2005
Marcel	It's Just Harry	Chilling Place
2004
Lingo	Garde Champetre	Bourbon Manhattan
2003
Thisthatandtother	Puntal	Self Defense
2002
Miros	Le Roi Miguel	Tarasco
2001
Iznogoud	St Pirran	Reiziger

2000-1991
2000
Monsignor	Best Mate	Doctor Goddard
1999
Behrajan	Hidebound	Great Crusader
1998
French Holly	Grey Shot	Bracey Run
1996
Right Win	Strong Promise	Shankar
1995
Silver Wedge	Callisoe Bay	Major Summit
1993
Sun Surfer	Dreamers Delight	Thumbs Up
1992
New York Rainbow	Muse	Thetford Forest
1991
Change The Act	Viceroy Jester	Tyrone Bridge

1990-1988
1990
Forest Sun	Atlaal	Tinryland
1989
Wishlon	Nodform	First Division
1988
Away We Go	Deep Moment	Merry Junior

The Formby Novices' Hurdle is a Grade 1 National Hunt hurdle race in Great Britain which is open to horses aged three years or older. It is run at Aintree over a distance of about 2 miles and a furlong (2 miles and 209 yards, or 3,410 metres), and during its running there are eight hurdles to be jumped. The race is for novice hurdlers, and it is scheduled to take place each year in December. From 2011 to 2018 the race was sponsored by online casino 32Red and was run as the 32Red Hurdle between 2011 and 2013. Since 2023 it has been sponsored by William Hill

Its predecessor was first run in 1976 at Sandown Park and was originally named the Tolworth Novices' Hurdle then simply the Tolworth Hurdle. As part of changes to the National Hunt pattern, since December 2023 the race has been run on Boxing Day at Aintree as the Formby Novices' Hurdle, open to horses aged three years and older.

== Records ==
Leading jockey (3 wins):

- Norman Williamson – Silver Wedge (1995), Monsignor (2000), Miros (2002)
- Ruby Walsh - Silverburn (2007), Breedsbreeze (2008), Yorkhill (2016)
- Barry Geraghty - Minella Class (2011), Captain Conan (2012), L'ami Serge (2015)

Leading trainer (7 wins):

- Nicky Henderson – New York Rainbow (1992), Minella Class (2011), Captain Conan (2012), Royal Boy (2014), L'ami Serge (2015), Constitution Hill (2022), Jango Baie (2023)

== Winners ==
Year	Winner	Age	Jockey	Trainer
1976	Grand Canyon	6	Peter Haynes	Derek Kent
1977	Levaramoss	4	Anson Gonsalves	Staff Ingham
1978	Western Rose	6	John Burke	Fred Rimell
1979	Abandoned due to snow
1980	Esparto	5	Oliver Sherwood (Note: amateur jockey)	Fred Winter
1981	Broadsword	4	Peter Scudamore	David Nicholson
1982	Abandoned due to frost and snow
1983	Hawkbarrow	5	Paul Barton	David Gandolfo
1984	Desert Orchid	5	Colin Brown	David Elsworth
1985	Wing and a Prayer	4	John Francome	John Jenkins
1986	Midnight Count	6	Richard Rowe	Josh Gifford
1987	Mister Point	5	Graham McCourt	Colin Tinkler
1988	Away We Go	6	Steve Smith Eccles	John Jenkins
1989	Wishlon	6	Ian Shoemark	Ron Smyth
1990	Forest Sun	5	Jimmy Frost	Toby Balding
1991	Change the Act	6	Jamie Osborne	Oliver Sherwood
1992	New York Rainbow	7	John Kavanagh	Nicky Henderson
1993	Sun Surfer	5	Carl Llewellyn	Tim Forster
1994	Abandoned due to waterlogging
1995	Silver Wedge	4	Norman Williamson	David Nicholson
1996	Right Win	6	Graham McCourt	Richard Hannon Sr.
1997	Abandoned due to frost
1998	French Holly	7	Andrew Thornton	Ferdy Murphy
1999	Behrajan	4	Richard Dunwoody	Henry Daly
2000	Monsignor	6	Norman Williamson	Mark Pitman
2001 (Note: The race was run at Ascot in 2001, Warwick in 2002 and Wincanton in 2003)	Iznogoud	5	Tony McCoy	Martin Pipe
2002	Miros	5	Norman Williamson	Jonjo O'Neill
2003	Thisthatandtother	7	Timmy Murphy	Paul Nicholls
2004	Lingo	5	Liam Cooper	Jonjo O'Neill
2005	Marcel	5	Timmy Murphy	Martin Pipe
2006	Noland	5	Christian Williams	Paul Nicholls
2007	Silverburn	6	Ruby Walsh	Paul Nicholls
2008	Breedsbreeze	6	Ruby Walsh	Paul Nicholls
2009	Abandoned due to frost
2010	Abandoned due to frost
2011	Minella Class	6	Barry Geraghty	Nicky Henderson
2012	Captain Conan	5	Barry Geraghty	Nicky Henderson
2013	Melodic Rendezvous	7	Nick Scholfield	Jeremy Scott
2014 (Note: The 2014 running took place at Kempton Park after the original fixture was abandoned due to waterlogging.)	Royal Boy	7	Tony McCoy	Nicky Henderson
2015	L'ami Serge	5	Barry Geraghty	Nicky Henderson
2016	Yorkhill	6	Ruby Walsh	Willie Mullins
2017	Finian's Oscar	5	Tom O'Brien	Colin Tizzard
2018	Summerville Boy	6	Noel Fehily	Tom George
2019	Elixir Du Nutz	5	Tom O'Brien	Colin Tizzard
2020	Fiddlerontheroof	6	Robbie Power	Colin Tizzard
2021	Metier	5	Sean Bowen	Harry Fry
2022	Constitution Hill	5	Nico de Boinville	Nicky Henderson
2023 (Jan)	Tahmuras	6	Harry Cobden	Paul Nicholls
2023 (Dec)	Jango Baie	4	James Bowen	Nicky Henderson
2024	Potters Charm	5	Sam Twiston-Davies	Nigel Twiston-Davies
2025	Idaho Sun	5	Bryan Carver	Harry Fry

== See also ==
- Horse racing in Great Britain
- List of British National Hunt races
