= Holloway's Hurdle =

Hurdle horse race in Britain

Holloway's Hurdle
2022
Unexpected Party	Fils D'oudairies	Garry Clermont

Previous years
2021
Craigneiche	Arrivederci	Kateson

2020-2011
2020
Thomas Darby	Song For Someone	Jolly's Cracked It
2019
Ballymoy	Colonial Dreams	Seddon
2018
Jenkins	Air Horse One	Burbank
2016
Rock The Kasbah	Baron Alco	Lil Rockerfeller
2015
Baradari	Lyvius	Le Mercurey
2014
Irish Saint	Imperial Leader	Bourne
2012
Smad Place	Shoreacres	Orzare
2011
Tiger O'Toole	Walkon	Lough Derg
2010
Mamlook	Tasheba	Lough Derg
2009
Lough Derg	Group Captain	Working Title
2008
Lough Derg	Warne's Way	Gold Gun

The Holloway's Hurdle is a Class 2 National Hunt hurdle race in Great Britain which is open to horses aged four years or older. It is run at Ascot over a distance of about 2 miles and 3½ furlongs (2 miles 3 furlongs and 58 yards, or 3,875 metres), and during its running there are ten hurdles to be jumped. It is a handicap race, and it is scheduled to take place each year in January. Prior to 2016 it was run as handicap with a limited weight race and carried Grade 2 status, after which it was demoted to Grade 3 status until 2022.

== Winners ==
- Weights given in stones and pounds.

Year	Winner	Age	Weight	Jockey	Trainer
2008	Lough Derg	8	11-10	Tom Scudamore	David Pipe
2009	Lough Derg	9	11-10	Tom Scudamore	David Pipe
2010	Mamlook	6	10-01	Hadden Frost	David Pipe
2011	Tiger O'Toole	6	10-05	Paul Moloney	Evan Williams
2012	Smad Place	5	11-09	Wayne Hutchinson	Alan King
2014	Irish Saint	5	11-05	Noel Fehily	Paul Nicholls
2015	Baradari	5	10-04	Aidan Coleman	Venetia Williams
2016	Rock The Kasbah	6	11-05	Richard Johnson	Philip Hobbs
	no race 2017 (Note: The 2017 running was abandoned due to frost)				
2018	Jenkins	6	11-03	James Bowen	Nicky Henderson
2019	Ballymoy	6	11-12	Tom Bellamy	Nigel Twiston-Davies
2020	Thomas Darby	7	11-12	Richard Johnson	Olly Murphy
2021	Craigneiche	7	10-06	Tom Cannon	Nicky Henderson

== See also ==
- Horse racing in Great Britain
- List of British National Hunt races
