= Geoffrey Gilbey Handicap Chase =

Steeplechase horse race in Britain

Geoffrey Gilbey Handicap Chase
2017
Plaisir D'amour	Red Devil Star	Greybougg

Previous years
2016
Ut Majeur Aulmes	Walk in the Mill	Starkie
2015
Village Vic	Paddy The Stout	Marie Des Anges
2014
Umberto D'olivate	Stone Light	Sir Valentino
2013
Silver Roque	Oscar Hill	Keki Buku
2012
Niceonefrankie	Lord Singer	Marodima
2011
Baseball Ted	Fiftyonefiftyone	Qulinton

2010-2001
2010
Chaninbar	Its Crucial	Kew Jumper
2009
Pepsyrock	Sole Agent	Hope Road
2008
Oceanos des Obeaux	Key Phil	Brave Villa
2007
Magic Sky	Jacks Craic	Pardishar
2006
Madison Du Berlais	Bonus Bridge	Master Rex
2005
Tanikos	Marked Man	Duchamp
2004
Venn Ottery	Abalvino	Davoski
2003
Abalvino	Ivanoph	Asparagus
2002
Carrick Troop	Mr Percy	Ivanoph

2000-1993
2000
Jungli	Kings Cherry	Sigma Run
1999
Buckland Lad	Native Fling	Morstock
1998
Tidebrook	Mister Oddy	Coolteen Hero
1997
Kings Cherry	High Alltitude	Mister Oddy
1996
Mister Oddy	Dear Do	Peaceman
1994
Spree Cross	Good for a Laugh	Young Snugfit
1993
Fragrant Dawn	Blustery Fellow	Al Hashimi

The Geoffrey Gilbey Handicap Chase is a National Hunt handicap chase in England which is open to horses aged five years or older. It is run at Newbury over a distance of 2 miles and 1 furlong (3,419 metres), and it is scheduled to take place each year in late February or early March.

The race was first run in 1970 over a distance of 2 miles 4 furlongs (4,023 metres). The distance was increased to 3 miles (4,828 metres) for one year only (1992), before the current distance was adopted in 1993.

The race has diminished in prestige since the 1980s and is now a Class 3 Handicap.

== Winners ==
Year	Winner	Age	Weight	Jockey	Trainer
1970	Simian	8	10-10	D Moore	Miss A Sinclair
1971	Into View	8	11-09	Paul Kelleway	Fred Winter
1972	The Laird	11	11-10	Jeff King	Bob Turnell
1973	Crisp	10	12-01	Richard Pitman	Fred Winter
1974	Bula	9	11-04	John Francome	Fred Winter
1975	Game Spirit	9	11-08	Bill Smith	Fulke Walwyn
1976	Black Andrew	8	10-05	M Floyd	Fulke Walwyn
1977	Even Dawn	10	11-01	G Holmes	B Lunness
1978	Midnight Court	7	12-00	John Francome	Fred Winter
1979	Harry Hotspur	9	10-01	Steve Smith Eccles	Mrs D Oughton
1980	Bachelor's Hall	10	10–13	A Brown	Peter Cundell
1981	Dramatist	10	11-00	Bill Smith	Fulke Walwyn
1982	Straight Jocelyn	10	11-07	Bob Davies	Roddy Armytage
1983	Kathies Lad	6	10-06	Peter Scudamore	A Jarvis
1984	Classified	8	10–11	Charlie Mann	Nicky Henderson
1985	Western Sunset	9	10–12	Hwyel Davies	Tim Forster
1986	Abandoned because of frost
1987	Abandoned because of snow
1988	Pegwell Bay	7	11-10	Carl Llewellyn	Tim Forster
1989	Eastshaw	7	10-03	Carl Llewellyn	Tim Forster
1990	Gembridge Jupiter	12	10-09	P Dever	Chris Trietline
1991	Mr Entertainer	8	10-03	Brendan Powell Snr	Nick Gaselee
1992	Tom Troubadour	9	10-07	Declan Murphy	Josh Gifford
1993	Fragrant Dawn	9	11-00	Paul Holley	Martin Pipe
1994	Spree Cross		10-02	Adrian Maguire	Di Haine
1995	Abandoned due to waterlogged state of course
1996	Mister Oddy		11-11	Jim Culloty	Jeff King
1997	Kings Cherry		10-00	Carl Llewellyn	Jim Old
1998	Tidebrook		11-04	Norman Williamson	Kim Bailey
1999	Buckland Lad		10-00	Norman Williamson	Gardie Grissell
2000	Jungli		11-11	Justin McCarthy	Paul Webber
2001	Abandoned due to foot and mouth outbreak
2002	Carrick Troop	9	10-00	Paddy Aspell	Mary Reveley
2003	Abalvino	9	11-02	T Doyle	Paul Webber
2004	Venn Ottery	9	10–13	Ruby Walsh	Paul Nicholls
2005	Tanikos	6	10-09	Mick Fitzgerald	Nicky Henderson
2006	Madison Du Berlais	5	11-03	Tony McCoy	Martin Pipe
2007	Magic Sky	7	11-03	Charlie Poste	M F Harris
2008	Oceanos des Obeaux	6	11–12	Richard Johnson	Philip Hobbs
2009	Pepsyrock	6	11-00	Barry Geraghty	Nicky Henderson
2010	Chaninbar	7	11–12	Sean Quinlan	M F Harris
2011	Baseball Ted	9	10–13	Tom O'Brien	Charlie Longsdon
2012	Niceonefrankie	6	11-08	Aidan Coleman	Venetia Williams
2013	Silver Roque	7	11–12	Paddy Brennan	Fergal O'Brien
2014	Umberto D'olivate	6	11-11	Felix de Giles	Robert Walford
2015	Village Vic	8	11-07	Richard Johnson	Philip Hobbs
2016	Ut Majeur Aulmes	8	11-02	Ciaran Gethings	Victor Dartnell
2017	Plaisir D'amour	5	12-02	Aidan Coleman	Venetia Williams
2018	Abandoned due to frost
2019	Lillington	7	11-4	Tom Scudamore	Colin Tizzard
2020	Billingsley	8	11-10	Liam Treadwell	Alastair Ralph
2021	Editeur Du Gite	7	11-08	Joshua Moore	Gary Moore
2022	Monsieur Lecoq	8	11-02	Ciaran Gethings	Jane Williams
2023	Calgary Tiger	8	10-02	Ben Ffrench-Davis	William de Best-Turner
2024	I'd Like To Know	7	11-02	Rex Dingle	Chris Gordon
2025	Rath Gaul Hill	7	11-05	Sam Twiston-Davies	Samuel Drinkwater
2026	Daytime Dreaming	6	11-10	Jack Andrews	Tom Ellis
