= Bet365 Select Hurdle =

Hurdle horse race in Britain

Select Hurdle
2026
Jingko Blue	Lucky Place	French Ship

Previous years
2025
Blueking D'oroux	Salver	Kitzbuhel
2024
Impaire Et Passe	Langer Dan	Sir Gerhard
2023
Knappers Hill	Goshen	Theatre Glory
2022
McFabulous	Indefatigable	Fusil Raffles
2021
Younevercall	Indefatigable	Call Me Lord

2020-2014
2019
Younevercall	On The Blind Side	Thomas Campbell
2018
Call Me Lord	Lil Rockerfeller	Wholestone
2017
L'Ami Serge	Ptit Zig	Volnay De Thaix
2016
Ptit Zig	Silsol	Vaniteux
2015
Polly Peachum	Aqalim	Southfield Vic
2014
Southfield Theatre	Polly Peachum	Clerk's Choice

The Bet365 Select Hurdle is a Grade 2 National Hunt hurdle race in Great Britain which is open to horses aged four years or older. It is run at Sandown Park over a distance of about 2 miles and 5½ furlongs (4,325 metres), and it is scheduled to take place each year in April.

The race was first run in 2014 and was upgraded from Listed to Grade 2 status from the 2017 running.

== Records ==
Most successful horse (2 wins):

- Younevercall (2019, 2021)

Leading jockey (3 wins):

- David Bass - Polly Peachum (2015), Younevercall (2019, 2021)

Leading trainer (5 wins):

- Paul Nicholls - Southfield Theatre (2014), Ptit Zig (2016), McFabulous (2022), Knappers Hill (2023), Blueking d'Oroux (2025)

== Winners ==
Year	Winner	Age	Jockey	Trainer
2014	Southfield Theatre	6	Sam Twiston-Davies	Paul Nicholls
2015	Polly Peachum	7	David Bass	Nicky Henderson
2016	Ptit Zig	7	Sam Twiston-Davies	Paul Nicholls
2017	L'Ami Serge	7	Daryl Jacob	Nicky Henderson
2018	Call Me Lord	5	Nico de Boinville	Nicky Henderson
2019	Younevercall	8	David Bass	Kim Bailey
	no race 2020 (Note: The 2020 running was cancelled because of the COVID-19 pandemic in the United Kingdom)
2021	Younevercall	10	David Bass	Kim Bailey
2022	McFabulous	8	Lorcan Williams	Paul Nicholls
2023	Knappers Hill	7	Bryony Frost	Paul Nicholls
2024	Impaire Et Passe	6	Paul Townend	Willie Mullins
2025	Blueking d'Oroux	6	Harry Cobden	Paul Nicholls
2026	Jingko Blue	7	James Bowen	Nicky Henderson

== See also ==
- Horse racing in Great Britain
- List of British National Hunt races
