= Freebooter Handicap Chase =

Steeplechase horse race in Britain

Betway Handicap Chase
2026
Mr Hope Street	Lookaway	Konfusion

Previous years
2025
Cruz Control	Imperial Saint	Erne River
2024
Cruz Control	Sam Brown	Forward Plan
2023
Midnight River	Bowtogreatness	Kinondo Kwetu
2022
Sam Brown	Shan Blue	Killer Kane
2021
Happygolucky	Johnbb	Spiritofthegames

2020-2011
2019
Kildisart	Mister Malarky	Oldgrangewood
2018
Thomas Patrick	On Tour	Paper Lantern
2017
Sizing Codelco	Rightdownthemiddle	Starchitect
2016
Maggio	Virak	Al Co
2015
Duke of Lucca	Your Busy	Wonderful Charm
2014
Duke of Lucca	Vino Griego	Gullinbursti
2013
Battle Group	Mac Aeda	Johns Spirit
2012
Saint Are	Battle Group	Chapoturgeon
2011
Prince De Beauchene	Categorical	Reve De Sivola

2010-2001
2010
From Dawn To Dusk	Dom d'Orgeval	Rare Bob
2009
Don't Push It	Leading Contender	Oakfield Legend
2008
Oedipe	Three Mirrors	Alderburn
2007
Reveillez	Lankawi	Lacdoudal
2006
State of Play	Lacdoudal	Aristoxene
2005
Sleeping Night	Zeta's River	Hand Inn Hand
2004
Lord of the River	Midland Flame	Un Jour A Vassy
2003
Master Tern	Shardam	Ross Moff
2002
Carbury Cross	Enrique	Macgeorge
2001
Kingsmark	Paperising	Royale De Vassy

2000-1991
2000
Radiation	Ashwell Boy	Honey Mount
1999
Edelweis Du Moulin	Clinton	Ashwell Boy
1998
Blue Charm	Glitter Isle	Queen Of Spades
1997
Unguided Missile	Cab On Target	Bertone
1996
All For Luck	Morgans Harbour	Strong Medicine
1995
Flash The Cash	Musthaveaswig	Gallateen
1994
Grange Brake	Arthur's Minstrel	Flash The Cash
1993
Black Humour	Sikera Spy	Rocktor
1992
River Bounty	Rocktor	In The Fashion
1991
Gold Options	Nodform	Alone Success

1990-1988
1990
One More Knight	Seagram	Killone Abbey
1989
Travel Over	Rusch De Farges	Ace Of Spies
1988
Rinus	Gala's Image	Torside

The Freebooter Handicap Chase, currently run as the William Hill Handicap Chase, is a Premier Handicap National Hunt Grade 3 handicap chase in Great Britain which is open to horses aged five years or older. It is run at Aintree over a distance of about 3 miles and 1 furlong (3 miles and 210 yards, or 5,020 metres), and during its running there are 19 fences to be jumped. It is scheduled to take place each year at the Grand National meeting in April.

The race was raised from Listed to Grade Three status from 2018.

== Records ==
Most successful horse (2 wins):

- Duke of Lucca – 2014,2015
- Cruz Control- 2024,2025

Leading jockey (4 wins):

- Richard Johnson - From Dawn To Dusk (2010), Duke of Lucca (2014, 2015), Thomas Patrick (2018)

Leading trainer (4 wins):

- Jonjo O'Neill - Radiation (2000), Carbury Cross (2002), Master Tern (2003), Don't Push It (2009)

== Winners since 1977 ==
Year	Winner	Age	Weight	Jockey	Trainer
1977	Our Edition	10	11-13	Steve Jobar	Stan Mellor
1978	Mr Snowman	9	10-10	Graham Thorner	Tim Forster
1979	Silent Valley	6	9-10	John Allen	Ian Jordan
1980	New Colonist	8	10-03	Tommy Carmody	Tony Dickinson
1981	Megans Boy	8	11-05	Tony Charlton	E Carter
1982	Silent Valley	9	10-13	Peter Scudamore	Ian Jordan
1983	Fauloon	8	10-07	Bill Smith	Fulke Walwyn
1984	Staight Accord	9	11-08	Stuart Shilston	Fulke Walwyn
1985	Green Bramble	8	10-03	Steve Smith Eccles	Nicky Henderson
1986	Arctic Beau	8	10-01	Richard Dunwoody	John Thorne
1987	Gainsay	8	10-11	Mark Pitman	Jenny Pitman
1988	Rinus	7	10-02	Richard Dunwoody	Gordon W. Richards
1989	Travel Over	8	10-01	Mickey Hammond	Monica Dickinson
1990	One More Knight	7	10-12	Luke Harvey	Mrs I McKie
1991	Gold Options	9	11-10	Mark Dwyer	Jimmy FitzGerald
1992	River Bounty	6	10-00	Robert Supple	John Upson
1993	Black Humour	9	12-00	Graham Bradley	Charlie Brooks
1994	Grange Brake	8	10-00	David Bridgwater	Nigel Twiston-Davies
1995	Flash The Cash	9	10-03	Jamie Osborne	Charles Egerton
1996	All For Luck	11	11-00	Jonothon Lower	Martin Pipe
1997	Unguided Missile	9	12-00	Richard Dunwoody	Gordon W. Richards
1998	Blue Charm	8	09-12	Mark Bradburne	Sue Bradburne
1999	Edelweis Du Moulin	7	11-10	Richard Dunwoody	Venetia Williams
2000	Radiation	7	10-02	Richie McGrath	Jonjo O'Neill
2001	Kingsmark	8	12-00	Mick Fitzgerald	Martin Todhunter
2002	Carbury Cross	8	11-02	Liam Cooper	Jonjo O'Neill
2003	Master Tern	8	11-01	Tony Dobbin	Jonjo O'Neill
2004	Lord of the River	12	10-00	Paul Carberry	Nicky Henderson
2005	Sleeping Night	9	11-00	Ruby Walsh	Paul Nicholls
2006	State of Play	6	10-02	Paul Moloney	Evan Williams
2007	Reveillez	8	11-08	Tony McCoy	James Fanshawe
2008	Oedipe	6	10-04	Andrew Tinkler	Nicky Henderson
2009	Don't Push It	9	10–11	Tony McCoy	Jonjo O'Neill
2010	From Dawn To Dusk	11	11-00	Richard Johnson	Philip Hobbs
2011	Prince De Beauchene	8	10-10	Paul Gallagher	J Howard Johnson
2012	Saint Are	6	10–13	Dougie Costello	Tim Vaughan
2013	Battle Group	8	10-09	Daryl Jacob	Kevin Bishop
2014	Duke of Lucca	9	10-07	Richard Johnson	Philip Hobbs
2015	Duke of Lucca	10	10-04	Richard Johnson	Philip Hobbs
2016	Maggio	11	10-09	James Reveley	Patrick Griffin
2017	Sizing Codelco	8	11-03	Robbie Power	Colin Tizzard
2018	Thomas Patrick	6	10-10	Richard Johnson	Tom Lacey
2019	Kildisart	7	11-12	Daryl Jacob	Ben Pauling
	no race 2020 (Note: The 2020 running was cancelled because of the COVID-19 pandemic in the United Kingdom)
2021	Happygolucky	7	11-07	David Bass	Kim Bailey
2022	Sam Brown	10	11-04	Aidan Coleman	Anthony Honeyball
2023	Midnight River	8	11-07	Harry Skelton	Dan Skelton
2024	Cruz Control	7	10-10	Stan Sheppard	Tom Lacey
2025	Cruz Control	8	10-11	Stan Sheppard	Tom Lacey

== See also ==
- Horse racing in Great Britain
- List of British National Hunt races
