= Sean Bowen =

Welsh jockey

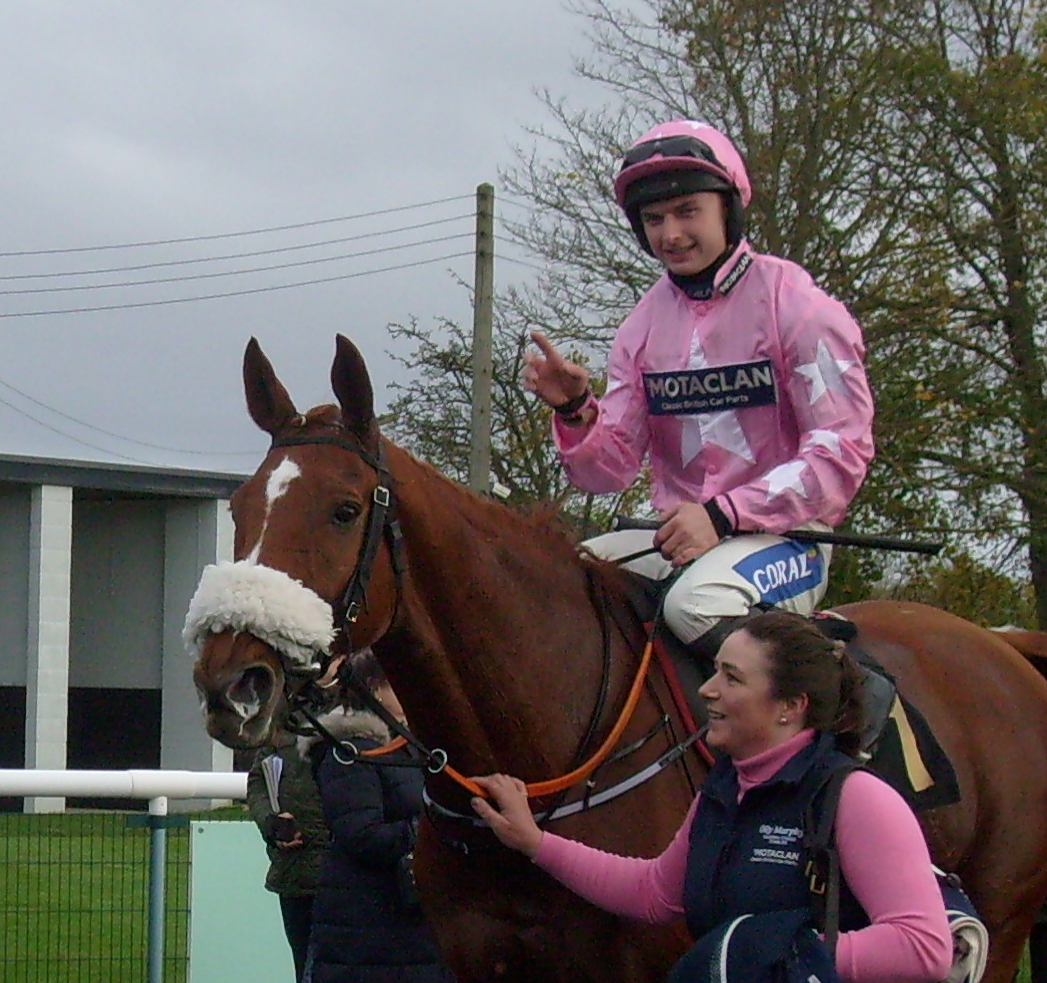

Personal information
- Born: 5 September 1997 (age 28) Little Newcastle, Pembrokeshire, Wales
- Occupation: Jockey

Horse racing career
- Sport: Horse racing

Major racing wins
- Tolworth Novices Hurdle (2021); Liverpool Hurdle (2019)

Racing awards
- Lester Awards x2 (2015)

Honours
- Champion Conditional Jockey (2014-15); Racing Excellence Hands and Heels Series Champion (2015); British jump racing Champion Jockey (2024–25, 2025–26)

Significant horses
- Metier, If The Cap Fits, Haiti Couleurs

Sean Bowen (born 5 September 1997) is a Welsh jockey who competes in National Hunt racing. He was champion conditional jockey in 2014-15 and British jump racing champion jockey in 2024–25 and 2025–26.

== Background ==
Bowen comes from a racing background. His father, Peter, is a trainer. His mother, Karen, is a former champion point-to-point rider. His younger brother, James, is a jockey, while his older brother, Mickey, trains with his father, taking over the licence in May 2025 after sharing it for a season. Bowen won a pony racing championship before riding in point-to-points, where he was awarded the Wilkinson Sword title for top novice rider in the UK.

== Career as a jockey ==
In 2015, Bowen won both the conditional jockey championship and the Racing Excellence hands and heels championship. In the same year, Bowen won his first two Lester Awards for both Racing Excellence Conditional Jockey and the AtTheRaces Jump Ride of the Year for his win on Just A Par at Sandown Park.

In 2015, Bowen achieved his first Grade race win, riding Just A Par for trainer Paul Nicholls in the Grade 3 Bet365 Gold Cup. His first Grade 1 victory was on board If The Cap Fits in the 2019 Liverpool Hurdle.

During the 2023–24 season Bowen had a 31 win lead in the championship when he injured his knee in a Boxing Day fall and was overtaken by Harry Cobden, who went on to secure the title. Bowen rode his 1,000th winner at Fakenham in February 2025. Riding as stable jockey to Warwickshire trainer Olly Murphy, he became champion jockey in the 2024–25 season with 180 wins. In the 2025–26 season he rode more than 200 winners for the first time and was champion jockey for the second time, with 241 wins.

In 2019, Bowen became an official ambassador to Ffos Las Racecourse.

== Major wins ==
(United Kingdom) Great Britain

- Fighting Fifth Hurdle - (1) Not So Sleepy (2023)
- Liverpool Hurdle - (2) If The Cap Fits (2019), Strong Leader (2024)
- Tolworth Novices' Hurdle - (1) Metier (2021)
