= Len Lungo =

British jockey and racehorse trainer

Len Lungo (born 1950) is a Scottish race horse trainer and former jockey.

Len Lungo is based at Hetland Hill stables in Dumfriesshire overlooking the Solway Firth.

In 2001, Len Lungo's work was impacted due to government placed restrictions regarding animals in light of the foot and mouth disaster.

Len Lungo broke the late Ken Oliver's Scottish record for the most wins in a National Hunt season. Lungo extended that record again in subsequent years setting a new personal best of 63 winners in season 2002–3. In the two seasons following, the number of winners dropped to 47 and 56, still comfortably ahead of any other Scottish trainer but disappointing by the high standards he sets himself.

As of June 2009, it has been reported by the Elite Racing Club that Len is "cutting back his training interests" with a view to letting out the train facilities at Carrutherstown.

== Away from horses ==
Len Lungo is a fan of Dumfries football club Queen of the South.
