= Fakenham Racecourse =

National Hunt racecourse in Norfolk, England

Coordinates: 52°49′21″N 0°51′18″E

Fakenham
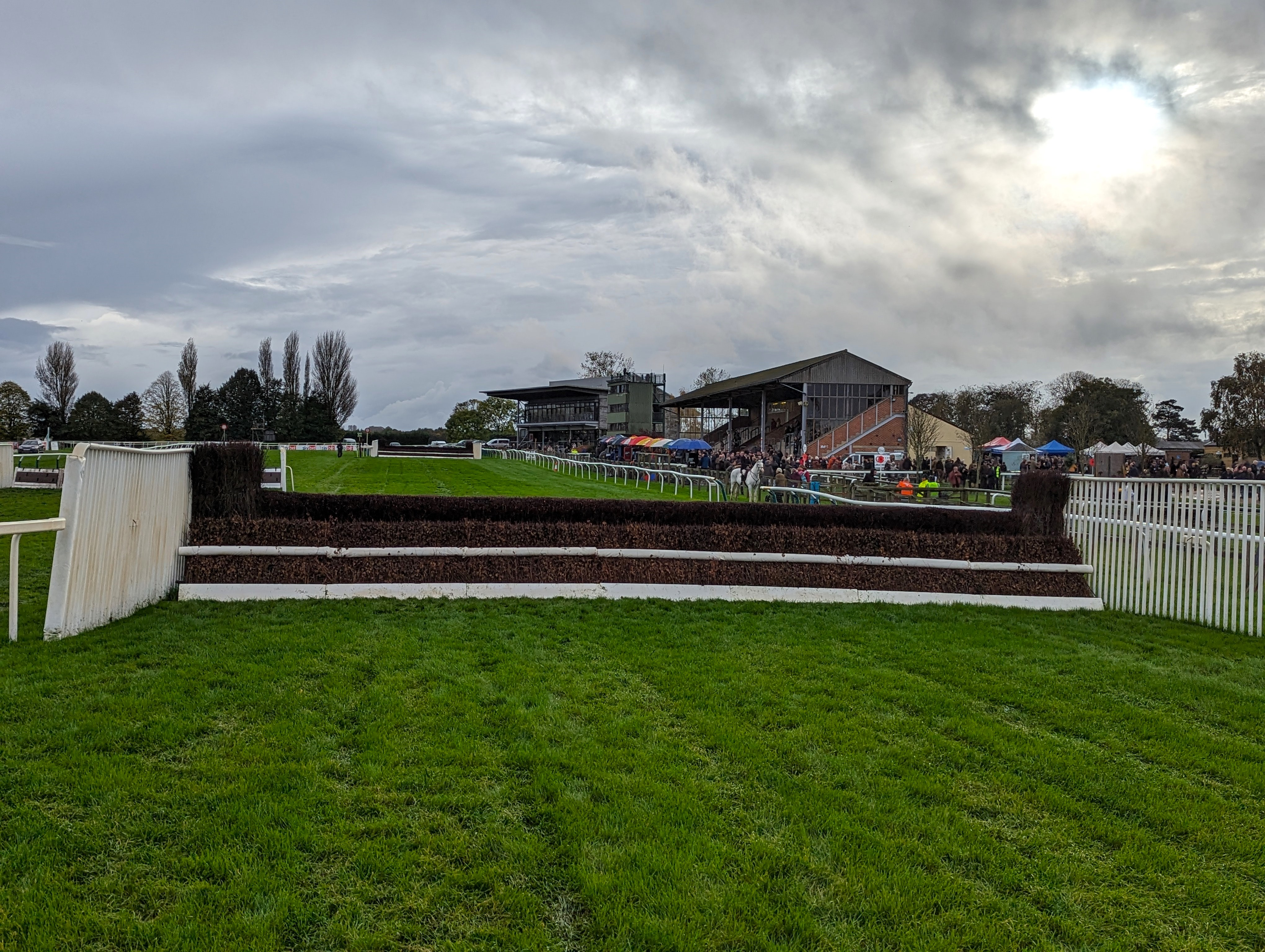
- The home straight and stands
- Interactive map of Fakenham
- Location: Fakenham, Norfolk
- Owned by: Fakenham Racecourse Ltd.
- Screened on: Racing TV
- Course type: National Hunt

Fakenham Racecourse is a thoroughbred horse racing venue located south of Fakenham, Norfolk, England. King Charles III is patron.

== Course ==
The course is left-handed, almost square in shape, with a circumference of about a mile. The steeplechase course is situated to the outside of the hurdle course and consists of six fences per circuit, with the open ditch as the penultimate obstacle.

It is also the venue for the West Norfolk Hunt's Point to Point.

== History ==
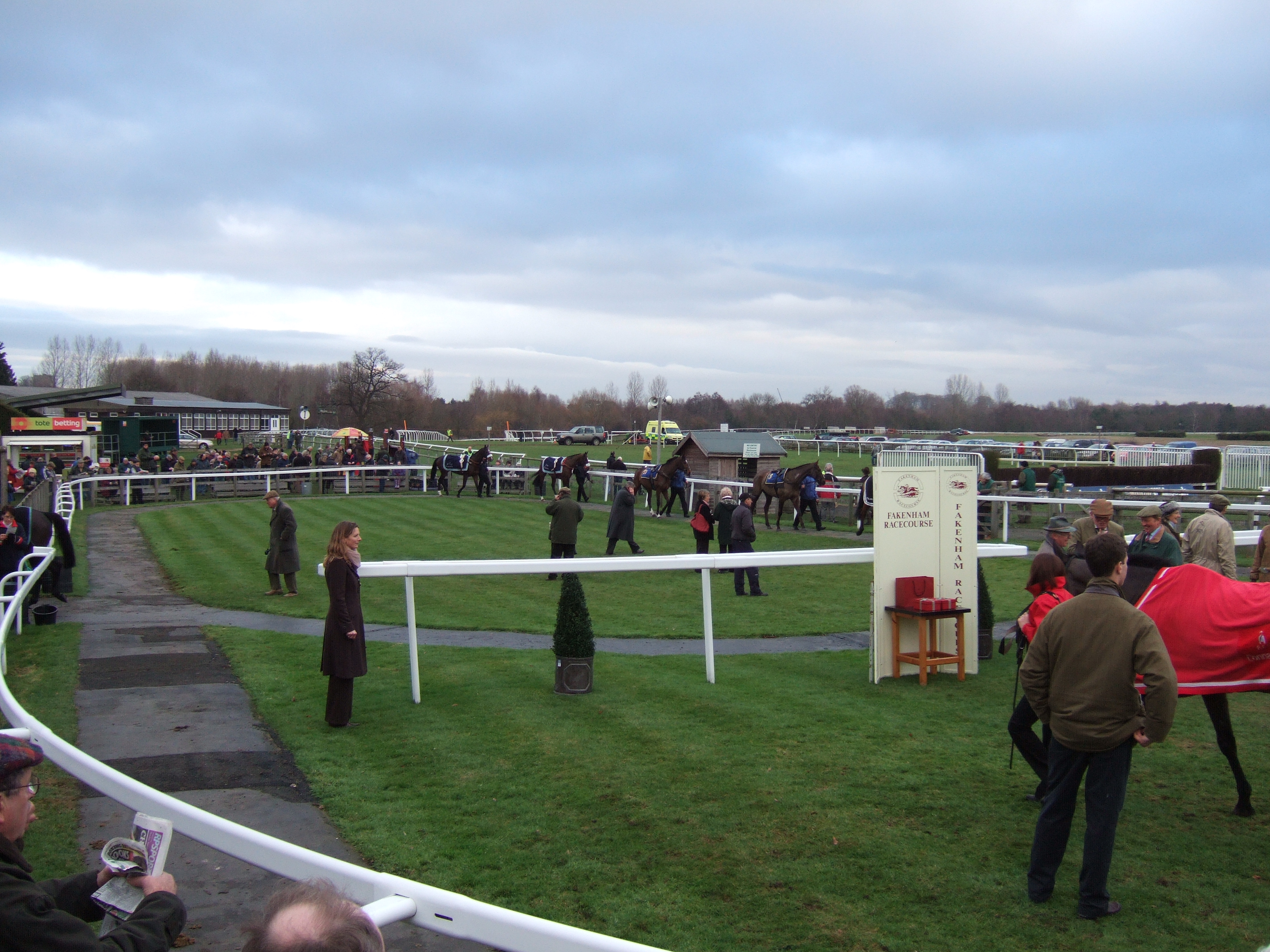
The parade ring

Racing first took place at Fakenham on Easter Monday after the West Norfolk Hunt took a committee decision to transfer their race meeting from East Winch, near King's Lynn. The West Norfolk Hunt had run meeting since 1884 at East Winch but because of concerns over continual heavy going at the course, a more suitable, lighter soil site was identified at Fakenham.

This first meeting in 1905 attracted 37 runners and considering the travelling difficulties in those days, confirmed the excellent local support for the transfer to Fakenham. Just the one meeting per year was held on Easter Monday with racing continuing every year except for enforced breaks during the world wars and the more recent pandemic. In 1926, there was the introduction of a hurdle race as the steeplechase races had dwindled in numbers. The three mile steeplechase in those times started in the fields adjoining the Fakenham-Dereham road before joining and finishing on the racecourse proper. After the Second World War, racing resumed in 1947 and in addition to the Easter meeting there was now a second meeting allotted on Whitsun Bank Holiday Monday for which success was assured with no fewer than 208 entries for the six races. In 1953, the original Grandstand was built with enlargements to the paddock and the Paddock and Parade Ring moved.

1965, saw the formation of Fakenham Racecourse Ltd, to continue to qualify for Levy Board support and fundamental to surviving the threat of closure. The financial support was enhanced when part of the racecourse was leased to develop a sports centre to include a golf course together with tennis and squash courts for the benefit of the local community with improved facilities at the racecourse.

== The Racecourse and the royal family ==
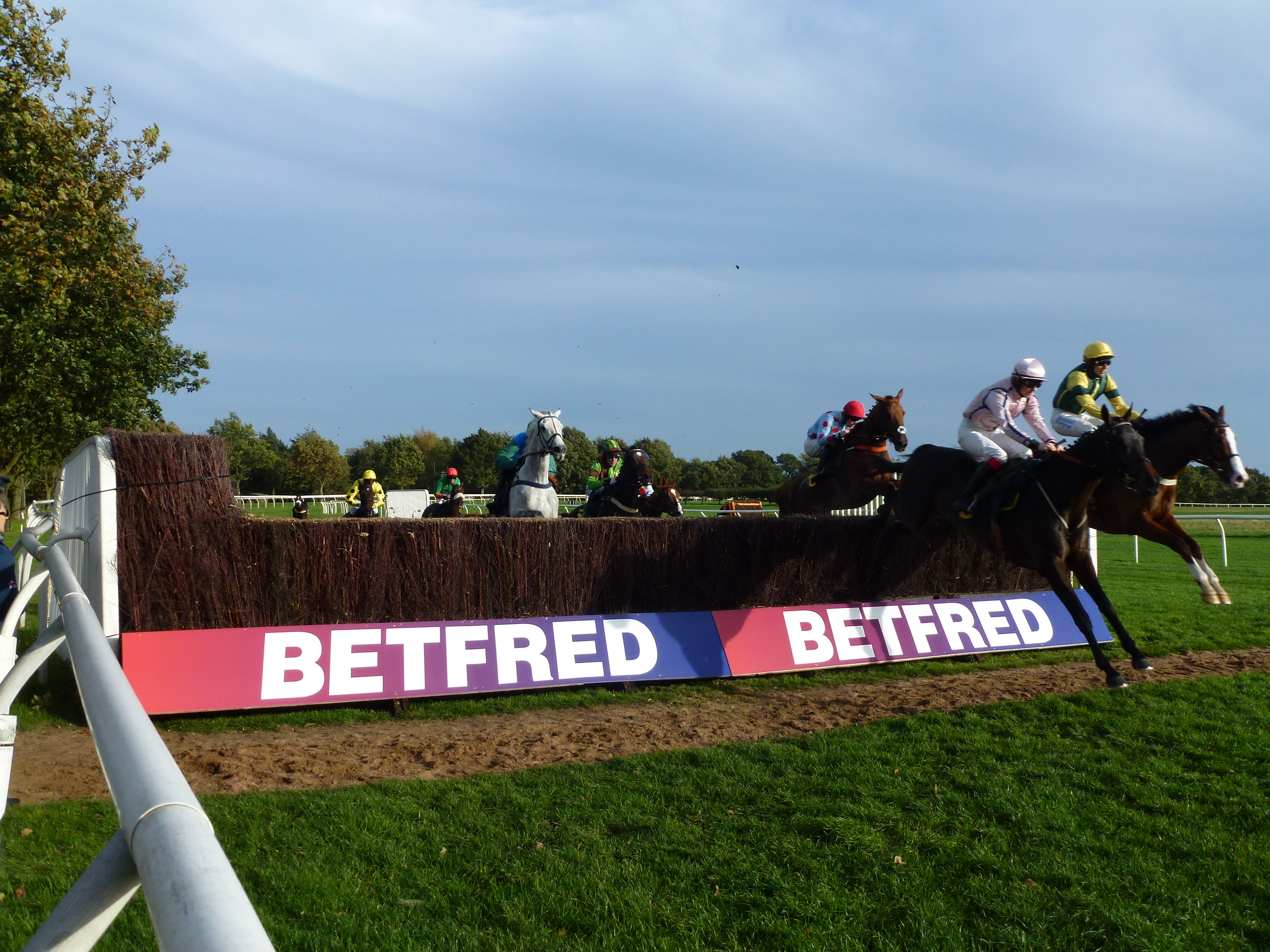
Horses jumping the open ditch

There has always been royal patronage for racing in west Norfolk. Commencing at East Winch with the Prince of Wales (later King Edward VII) through to Queen Elizabeth II, who was Patron for almost fifty years until Charles, Prince of Wales (now King Charles III) became patron on 1 January 2000. Fakenham's most extensive project, the £1 million Members' Stand, was named "The Prince of Wales Stand" and officially opened by the prince on 15 March 2002.

Queen Elizabeth The Queen Mother, often described as National Hunt's most fervent, enthusiastic and loyal supporter, visited Fakenham racecourse in 1981 and in January 2000.

== Other activities ==
The course also is a popular caravan and camping site offering 120 pitches across the racecourse as well as a wedding venue in the Prince of Wales stand and hosting a myriad of events throughout the year.
