= Sandown Park Racecourse =

Racecourse and leisure venue in Esher, Surrey

Coordinates: 51°22′33″N 0°21′42″W

Sandown Park
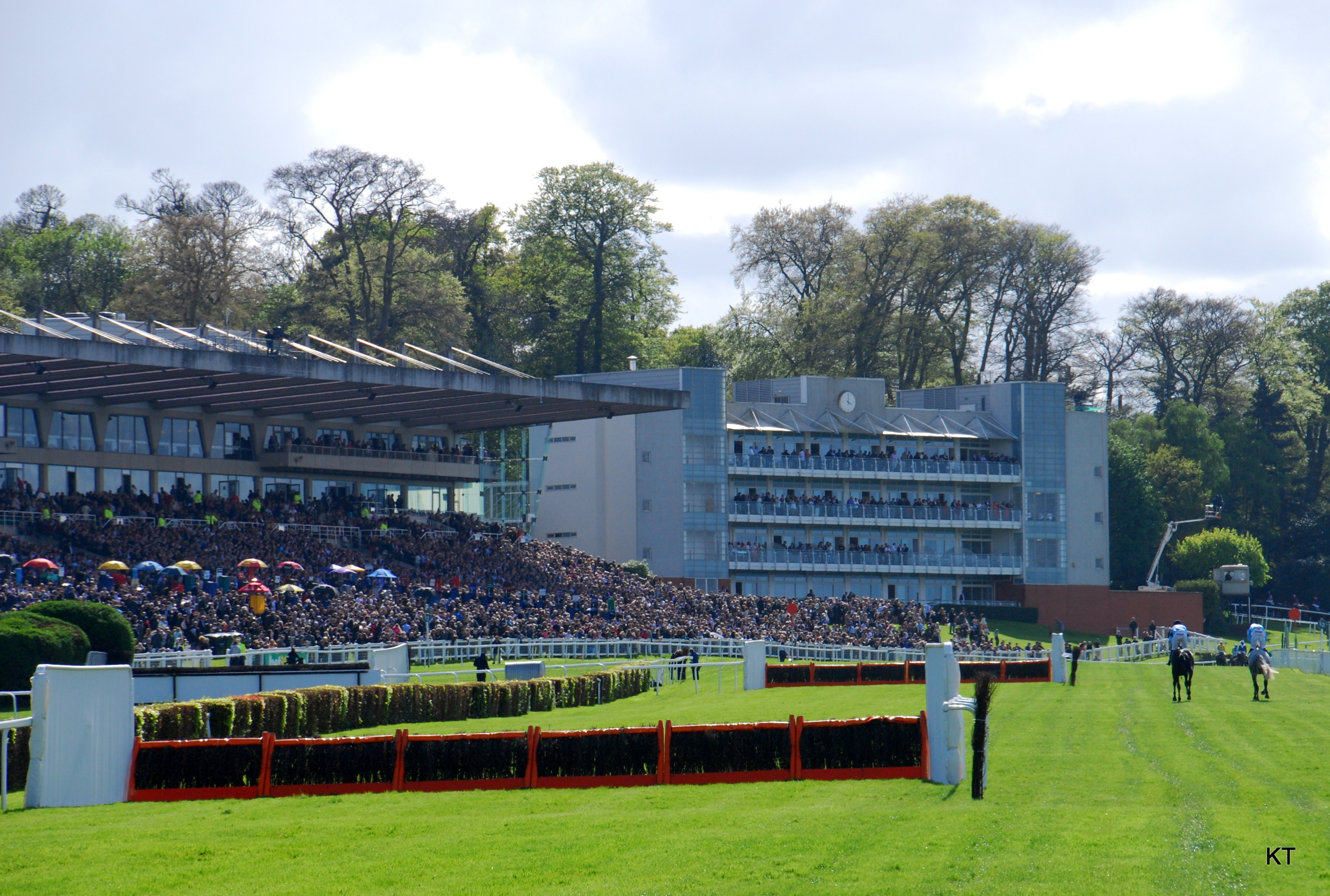
- Sandown Park Grandstand in 2014
- Interactive map of Sandown Park
- Location: Esher, Surrey
- Owned by: Jockey Club Racecourses
- Date opened: 1875
- Screened on: Racing TV
- Course type: Flat; National Hunt

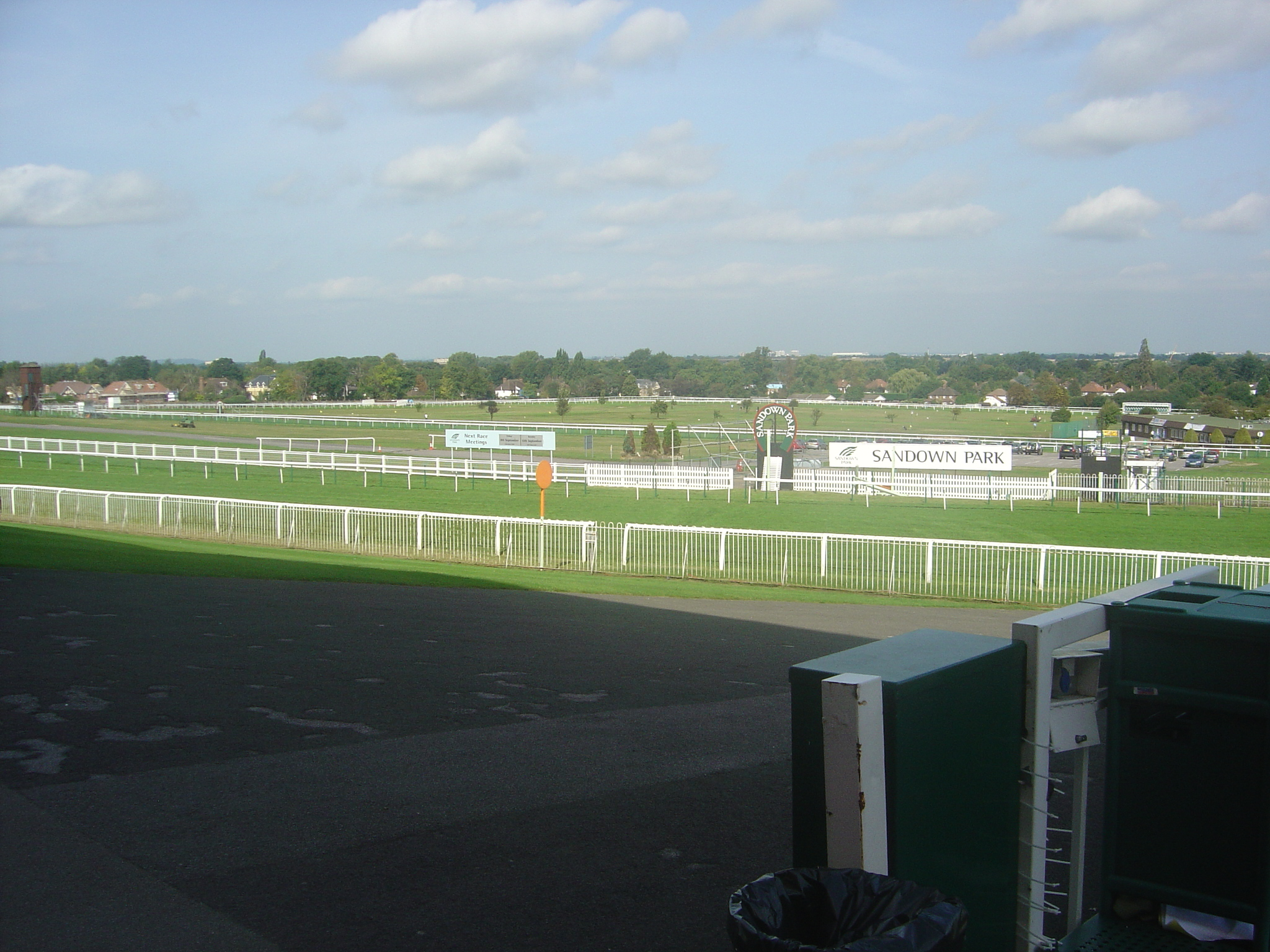
The Winning Line

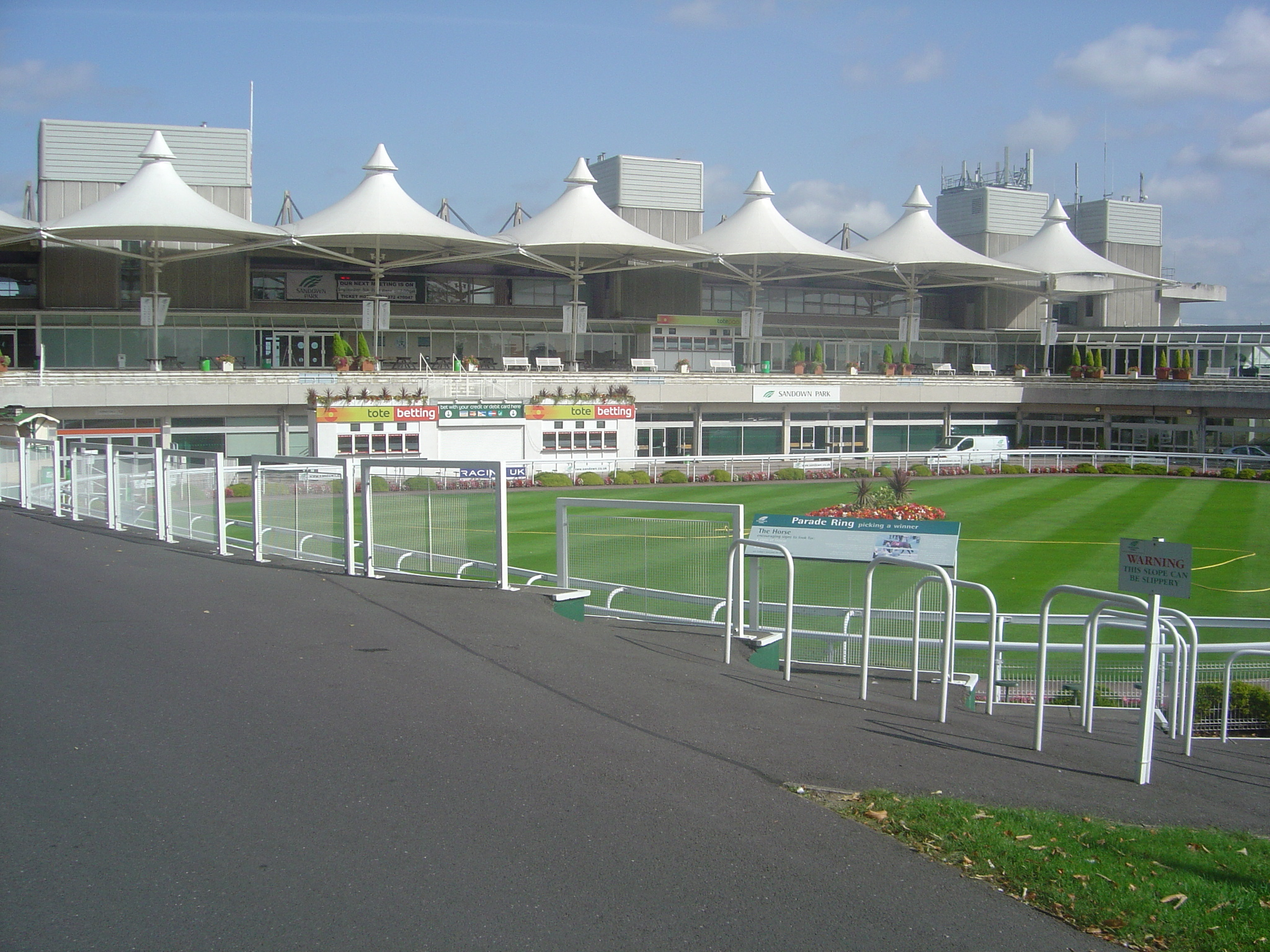
The Parade Ring

Sandown Park is a horse racing course and leisure venue in Esher, Surrey, England, located in the outer suburbs of London. It hosts 5 Grade One National Hunt races and one Group 1 flat race, the Eclipse Stakes. It regularly has horse racing during afternoons, evenings and on weekends, and also hosts many non-racing events such as trade shows, wedding fairs, toy fairs, car shows and auctions, property shows, concerts, and even some private events. It was requisitioned by the War Department from 1940 to 1945 for World War II.

The venue has hosted bands such as UB40, Madness, Girls Aloud, Spandau Ballet and Simply Red. The racecourse is close to Esher railway station, served by trains from London Waterloo. There is a secondary exit from Esher station which is open on race days, this exit leads directly into the racecourse and Lower Green, Esher.

== History ==
Sandown Park was the site of a priory built by Henry II. All the occupants died of plague in 1349. Later, a hospital was built there, and when this was demolished, the land was absorbed into Sandown Farm. Lieutenant Colonel Owen Williams bought the land from Mr J.W. Spicer. The colonel had a younger brother, Hwfa (pronounced 'Hoofer'), who realised that it was an ideal site for horse racing.

Hwfa Williams was clerk of the course at Sandown for about fifty years.

In 1903, Mr F.H. Bayles praised Sandown in his book, The Race Courses of Great Britain and Ireland, stating: "A movement for the betterment of English racing by the introduction of an enclosed meeting at Esher in Surrey, close by the Royal residence at Claremont, instituted in 1875, was the harbinger of racecourse reform; with the result that it has induced society to bestow upon it its patronage, by burying the bad reputation of many of its predecessors."

Society did patronise Sandown Park, including the Prince of Wales who won the Eclipse Stakes in 1897 with Persimmon, and in 1900 with Diamond Jubilee.

Sandown Park was one of the first courses to charge all for attending. It opened in 1875 and everyone had to pay at least half a crown. The first meeting was a mixed flat and jumps meeting over three days, starting on Thursday 22 April, and included the Grand National Hunt Chase, now staged at the Cheltenham Festival. The Grand International Steeple Chase took place on the Saturday, worth £2,130 to the winner, and was the largest prize for a steeplechase that season, unusually even eclipsing that for the Liverpool Grand National.

In 1875, Sandown became the first course in England to have a members' enclosure.

On 24 January 1948, the BBC broadcast two steeplechases and a hurdle race from Sandown – the first time that horse racing was shown live on television anywhere in the world.

The first sponsored National Hunt race took place at Sandown on 27 April 1957. Colonel W. H. Whitbread, chairman of the famous brewery, had supported jumping for many years (and had ridden in two Grand Nationals and completed the course both times) and conceived the idea of a sponsoring a valuable steeplechase at Sandown. The first Whitbread Gold Cup, over 3m 5f, with 24 fences, was won by the nine year old, Much Obliged (10/1), carrying 10st 12lbs, trained by Neville Crump, and ridden by J. East, with Mandarin second. The race is now known as the Bet365 Gold Cup.

Sandown was the first course to amalgamate the Silver Ring and Tattersalls Enclosure, in 1973, after the course had been closed for several months to facilitate building a new stand.

== Course ==
Sandown has two right-handed courses for flat racing and steeplechasing, both of which are about 1 mile 5 furlongs round. Hurdle races are run on the flat course. The courses are built on sandy soil and drain well. From the winning post on the flat course, the ground rises round the first turn, then drops 20 feet in 100 yards. It continues to fall slightly to the beginning of the back straight. After this the course is mostly flat to the final turn, about four furlongs from the winning post. The home straight is testing as it climbs steadily until levelling about fifty yards from the post. The five-furlong course runs diagonally across the circuit, with a different winning post from the round course.

The steeplechase course has eleven fences. After the winning post the runners take a right-hand bend to the first fence, taken slightly downhill on the outside of the flat course; then they turn into the back straight where they take two plain fences and an open ditch before crossing the flat course to take the water jump, then the three 'Railway' fences close together. On the home turn the 'chase course moves to the outside of the flat course, where the horses take the 'Pond' fence, three out, before a slight turn into the home straight for the final two fences, the second of which is divided into two, with half being an open ditch for the first circuit (or the first two circuits in 3m 5f races). There is a stiff climb from the final fence, with a run-in of 300 yards. Sandown is unusual, in that the water jump comes after the final open ditch.

The hurdles course has six flights, four down the back straight, two on the home straight.

== Notable races ==
Month	DOW	Race Name	Type	Grade	Distance	Age/Sex
January	Saturday	Anne Boleyn Mares' Hurdle	Hurdle	Listed	2m 4f	4yo+ m
January	Saturday	Stayers' Veterans' Handicap Chase Series Final	Chase	Handicap	3m	10yo+
January	Friday	Grand Military Gold Cup	Chase	Conditions	3m	6yo+
February	Saturday	Scilly Isles Novices' Chase	Chase	Grade 1	2m 4f	5yo+
February	Saturday	Heroes Handicap Hurdle	Hurdle	Premier Handicap	2m 6f	4yo+
February	Saturday	Wolsey Handicap Chase	Chase	Premier Handicap	2m	5yo+
February	Saturday	Masters Handicap Chase	Chase	Handicap	3m	5yo+
February	Thursday	Jane Seymour Mares' Novices' Hurdle	Hurdle	Grade 2	2m 4f	4yo+ m
February	Thursday	Royal Artillery Gold Cup	Chase	Conditions	3m	6yo+
March	Saturday	EBF 'National Hunt' Novices' Handicap Hurdle Final	Hurdle	Premier Handicap	2m 4f	4-7yo
March	Saturday	Imperial Cup	Hurdle	Premier Handicap	2m	4yo+
March	Saturday	Elmbridge Mares' Standard Open NHF Race	NH Flat	Listed	2m	4-6yo
April	Friday	Esher Cup	Flat	Handicap	1m	3yo
April	Friday	Gordon Richards Stakes	Flat	Group 3	1m 1f 209y	4yo+
April	Friday	Sandown Mile	Flat	Group 2	1m	4yo+
April	Friday	Sandown Classic Trial	Flat	Group 3	1m 1f 209y	3yo
April	Saturday	Novices' Championship Final Handicap Hurdle	Hurdle	Handicap	2m	4yo+
April	Saturday	Oaksey Chase	Chase	Grade 2	2m 6½f	5yo+
April	Saturday	Celebration Chase	Chase	Grade 1	1m 7½f	5yo+
April	Saturday	Bet365 Gold Cup	Chase	Premier Handicap	3m 5f	5yo+
April	Saturday	Select Hurdle	Hurdle	Grade 2	2m 5½f	4yo+
May	Thursday	National Stakes	Flat	Listed	5f 10y	2yo
May	Thursday	Henry II Stakes	Flat	Group 3	2m 50y	4yo+
May	Thursday	Heron Stakes	Flat	Listed	1m	3yo
May	Thursday	Brigadier Gerard Stakes	Flat	Group 3	1m 1f 209y	4yo+
May	Thursday	Whitsun Cup	Flat	Handicap	1m	4yo+
June	Saturday	Scurry Stakes	Flat	Listed	5f 10y	3yo
July	Friday	Dragon Stakes	Flat	Listed	5f 10y	2yo
July	Friday	Gala Stakes	Flat	Listed	1m 1f 219y	3yo+
July	Friday	Esher Stakes	Flat	Listed	2m 50y	4yo+
July	Saturday	Sprint Stakes	Flat	Group 3	5f 10y	3yo+
July	Saturday	Coral Challenge	Flat	Handicap	1m	3yo+
July	Saturday	Coral Distaff	Flat	Listed	1m	3yo f
July	Saturday	Eclipse Stakes	Flat	Group 1	1m 1f 209y	3yo+
July	Thursday	Star Stakes	Flat	Listed	7f	2yo f
August	Saturday	Atalanta Stakes	Flat	Group 3	1m	3yo+ f
August	Saturday	Solario Stakes	Flat	Group 3	7f	2yo
September	Wednesday	Fortune Stakes	Flat	Listed	1m	3yo+
December	Friday	Winter Novices' Hurdle	Hurdle	Grade 2	2m 4f	4yo+
December	Friday	Esher Novices' Chase	Chase	Grade 2	3m	4yo+
December	Saturday	Claremont Novices' Hurdle	Hurdle	Listed	2m	4yo+
December	Saturday	Henry VIII Novices' Chase	Chase	Grade 1	1m 7½f	4yo+
December	Saturday	Tingle Creek Chase	Chase	Grade 1	1m 7½f	4yo+
December	Saturday	London National	Chase	Handicap	3m 4½f	5yo+
