= Fergal O'Brien (trainer) =

Irish-born racehorse trainer (born 1972)

Fergal O’Brien
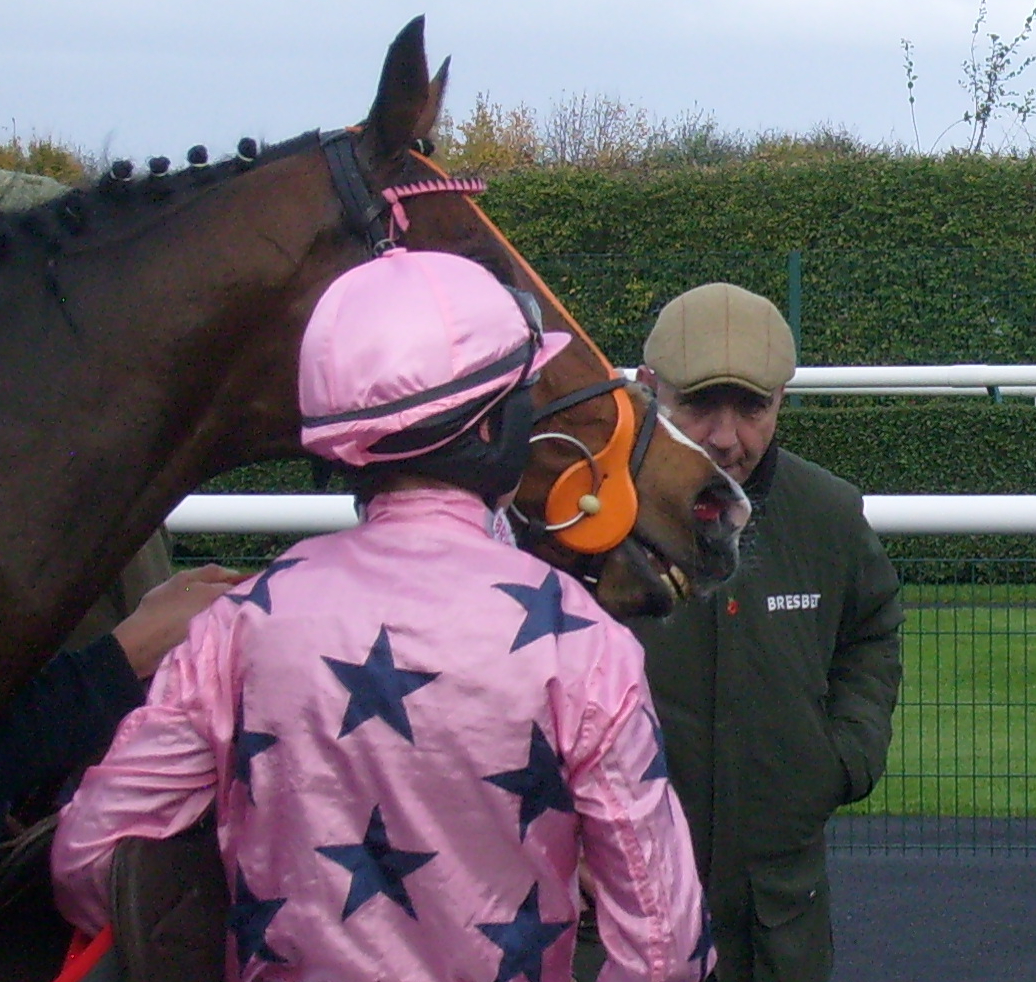
- O'Brien (right) with daughter Fern in the winners' enclosure at Huntingdon Racecourse, November 2024
- Born: 19 August 1972 (age 53); Limerick, Ireland
- Occupation: Horse trainer

Fergal O’Brien (born 19 August 1972) is an Irish Grade 1 winning National Hunt trainer based in Gloucestershire, England.

== Background and early career ==
O’Brien was born in Limerick, the youngest of six children. When he was four his family moved to Ballina, County Tipperary. Although the family was not involved with horses (his father was a bus driver and his mother a cook), two of his brothers left Ireland for England to work in racing. When O’Brien was sixteen, in 1989, he attended a course at the British Racing School in Newmarket and then went to work at the stables of Tim Forster in Lambourn. Having relinquished his ambition to be a jockey, he moved to the stables of Nigel Twiston-Davies at Naunton in Gloucestershire where he stayed for 19 years, becoming head lad and assistant trainer. While working for Nigel Twiston-Davies he helped prepare two Grand National winners, Earth Summit (1998) and Bindaree (2002), and Cheltenham Gold Cup winner Imperial Commander (2010).

== Career as a trainer ==
In 2011 O’Brien set up as a trainer on his own account, at first at Cilldara Stud near Northleach, then back at Naunton. Since 2019 he has been based at Ravenswell Farm near Cheltenham, owned by Restore Britain MP Rupert Lowe. Joining O'Brien at Ravenswell were assistant trainer Sally Randell, stable jockey Paddy Brennan, and conditional jockeys Liam Harrison and Connor Brace. O'Brien achieved his first Grade 1 success in 2017 when Poetic Rhythm, ridden by Paddy Brennan, won the Challow Novices' Hurdle at Newbury. In the 2020-21 season he achieved his first century of winners. He finished the season in seventh place in the jump trainers championship, which is decided on amount of prize money. In terms of winners, with 104 he was in third place behind Paul Nicholls (176 winners) and Nicky Henderson (147 winners). The post of honorary assistant trainer at Ravenswell is held by Kian Burley.

O'Brien holds a combined licence and has trained winners on the flat.

In October 2021 O'Brien went into partnership with fellow Gloucestershire trainer Graeme McPherson to form O'Brien McPherson Racing, with O'Brien concentrating on the training side of the operation and McPherson taking care of the business side. The 2021-22 season saw O'Brien finish in sixth place in the trainers' championship with 128 winners, a personal best. He also had more seconds and thirds than any other trainer. The 2022-23 season saw 141 winners, including a win for Dysart Enos in the Grade 2 mares' bumper in April at Aintree. In July 2023 the partnership with McPherson was ended, due to the logistical difficulties of managing two yards some distance apart. With the retirement of Paddy Brennan in April 2024, the position of stable jockey was taken by Jonathan Burke, who had ridden Crambo to victory for O'Brien in the Long Walk Hurdle at Ascot in December 2023.

== Personal life ==
O'Brien's partner is assistant trainer and former jockey Sally Randell. He has two daughters from his marriage to amateur jockey Angelica Nolan. Daughter Fern O'Brien is an amateur jockey. She rode her first winner on the flat on 25/1 chance Lord P, trained by her father, at Carlisle on 2 August 2021, two days after she turned sixteen. It was her first ride under rules, although she had previously won five pony races. She rode her first winner over jumps on Espoir de Teillee at Leicester on 28 February 2023.

O'Brien does not drink alcohol but never misses the opportunity to celebrate with a cake. He is part of a greyhound racing syndicate and enjoys family holidays in Devon.

== Major wins ==
(United Kingdom) Great Britain

- Challow Novices' Hurdle - (1) - Poetic Rhythm (2017)
- Long Walk Hurdle - (2) - Crambo (2023, 2024)
- Scilly Isles Novices' Chase - (1) - Sixmilebridge (2026)
