= Harry Fry (racehorse trainer) =

British racehorse trainer

Harry Fry (born 18 December 1986) is a British racehorse trainer specialising in National Hunt racing. Fry has trained from stables at Corscombe in Dorset since 2020, having previously been based at Seaborough in Dorset since taking out a trainer's licence in October 2012.

Fry has trained 2 winners at the Cheltenham Festival, Unowhatimeanharry and Love Envoi.

Prior to this he trained from the same stables but the licence was held by Paul Nicholls. Fry trained Rock On Ruby to win the 2012 Champion Hurdle but the victory was credited to Nicholls as the official trainer.

== Cheltenham winners (2) ==
- Albert Bartlett Novices' Hurdle – (1) – Unowhatimeanharry (2016)
- Dawn Run Mares' Novices' Hurdle – (1) Love Envoi (2022)

== Major wins ==
(United Kingdom) Great Britain

- Formby Novices' Hurdle - (1) - Idaho Sun (2025)
- Liverpool Hurdle – (1) – If The Cap Fits (2019)
- Long Walk Hurdle – (1) – Unowhatimeanharry (2016)
- Tolworth Novices' Hurdle – (1) – Metier (2021)

(Republic of Ireland) Ireland

- Champion Stayers Hurdle – (2) – Unowhatimeanharry (2017, 2019)
- Mares Novice Hurdle Championship Final – (1) – Bitofapuzzle (2015)
