= Wayne Hutchinson (jockey) =

British jockey

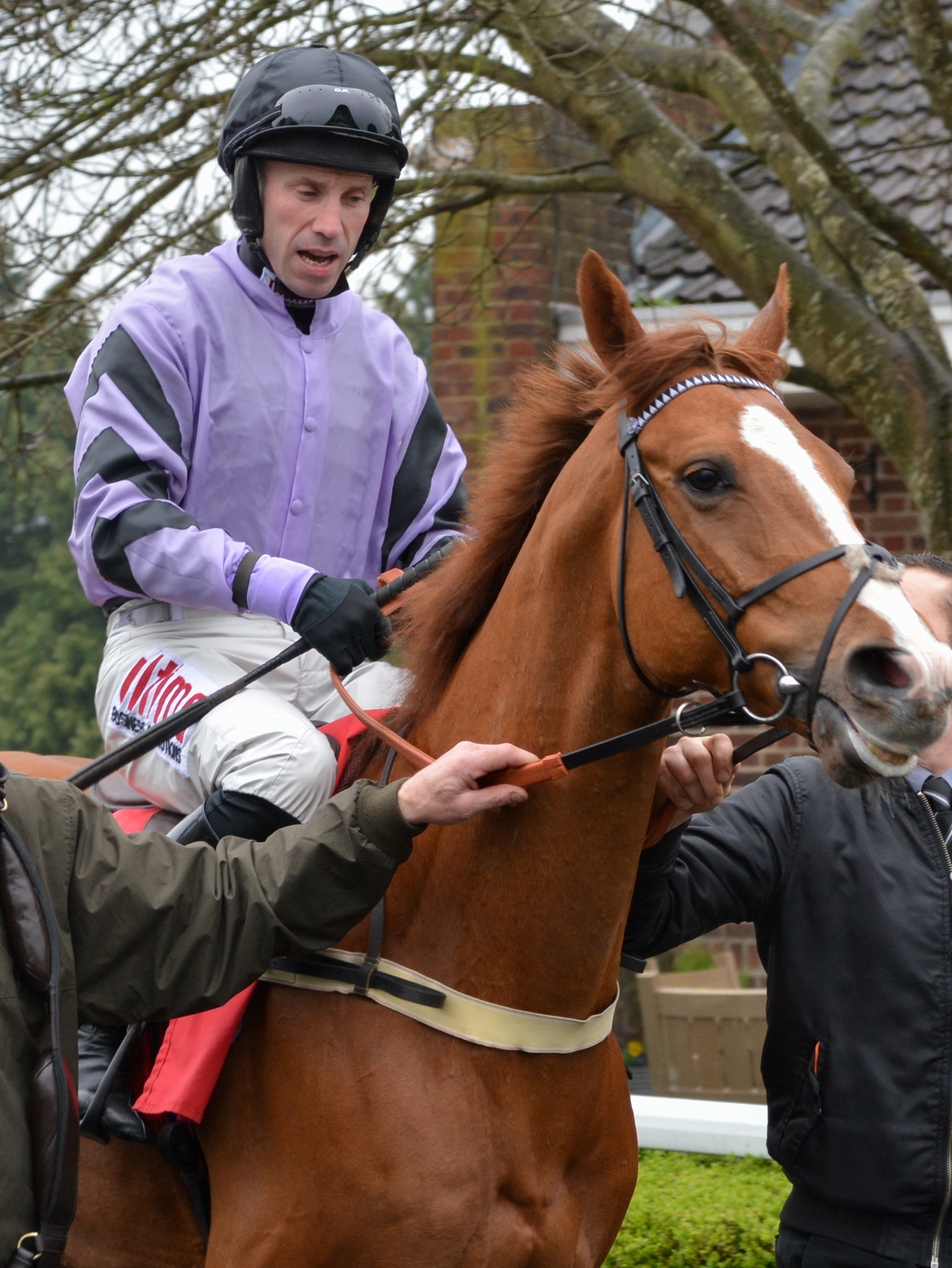
Wayne Hutchinson on Jaboticaba Kempton Park, April 2018

Wayne Hutchinson (born 25 February 1981) is a retired British jockey who competed principally in National Hunt racing. In a career lasting from the late 1990s to October 2019 he rode 795 National Hunt race winners, plus another 11 in flat racing. He spent much of his career at the stables of Alan King.

== Major wins ==
- Anniversary 4-Y-O Novices' Hurdle – L'Unique (2013)
- Ascot Chase – Balder Success (2015)
- Maghull Novices' Chase – Balder Success (2014)
