= Sedgefield Racecourse =

Racecourse in County Durham, England

Coordinates: 54°38′46.92″N 1°27′58.87″W

Sedgefield
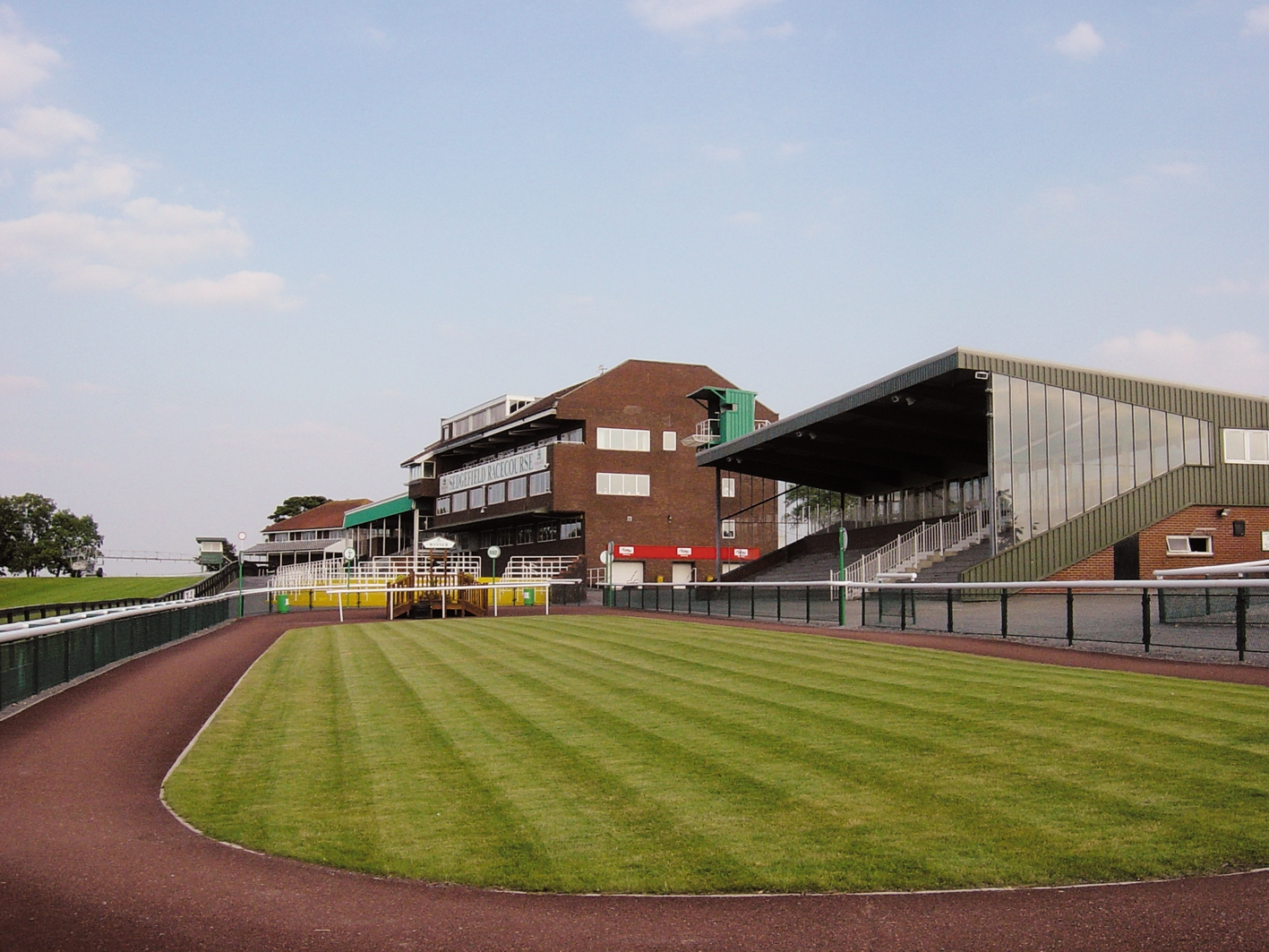
- The grandstand and parade ring
- Interactive map of Sedgefield
- Location: Sedgefield, County Durham
- Owned by: Arena Racing Company (formerly Northern Racing)
- Date opened: 1846 (officially recongised meetings)
- Screened on: Sky Sports Racing
- Course type: National Hunt
- Notable races: Durham National

Sedgefield Racecourse is an English left-handed horse racing course, used for National Hunt racing. It is owned by Arena Racing Company and located close to the town of Sedgefield, County Durham. The course is an undulating, left handed oval of about one mile and two furlongs, with tight bends. It was scheduled to host sixteen fixtures in 2026 and is also used as a venue for numerous other indoor and outdoor events, such as weddings and conferences.

Racing at Sedgefield has taken place since 1732 and moved to land laid out in the grounds of Sands Hall in 1804. The current course was laid out in 1846, when the first officially recognised meetings were made. Its facilities were very limited and the course narrowly avoided closure on occasions in the twentieth century but has survived, despite a high fatality rate (which has led to reconfigurations of the track).

== History ==
Racing has been taking place at Sedgefield since at least 1732, but little is known of these early meetings, and it is possible racing was taking place back in the 17th century. In 1804 Ralph John Lambton (c. 1767 – 1844), an ancestor of the Earls of Durham, formed a club based at the Hardwick Arms and Sedgefield became the headquarters of the Ralph Lambton Hunt. Racing flourished in land made available in the grounds of Sands Hall. Among the members of the club was Robert Smith Surtees, the author of Jorrocks. Indeed, Surtees would briefly take over Lambton's pack after he was left bedridden for the rest of his life after a crashing fall.

Racing may not have been staged every year and it was not until 1846 that officially recognised meetings were held and the present track laid out. The Sedgefield course was part of the Sands Hall Estate, home of the Ord family and once known as the Melton of the North, showing the high regard it was held in. A new stand was built in 1900 as a replacement for a wooden structure demolished in 1870.

Until World War I the Sedgefield Hunt staged an annual two-day fixture in March. When racing resumed the number of meetings soon increased to three, including a lucrative Bank Holiday fixture. A new Racecourse Company was founded in 1927, and by 1939, five fixtures were scheduled for the year (the last one didn't take place due to the outbreak of World War II however).

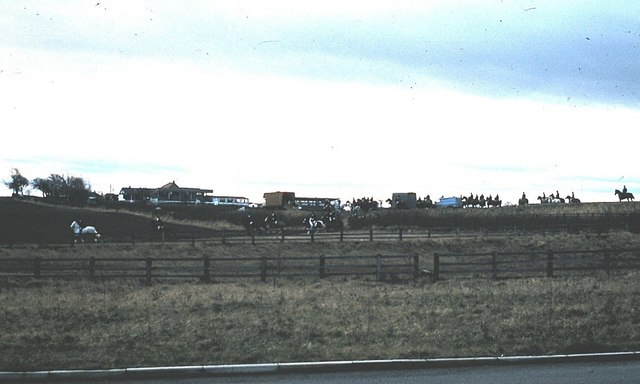
The traditional Boxing Day South Durham Hunt at the racecourse in 1974. Incidentally, Tony Blair was MP for Sedgefield and banned fox hunting in England & Wales.

Facilities only improved slowly, and in the 1960s Clement Freud famously described the course as 'all field and not much sedge'. In 1975, the course still lacked a photo finish camera for the fifteen meetings per year it staged by this time, which led to jostling of the judge by supporters of a beaten favourite. When Frank Scotto was appointed as chairman in 1977 following the death of Harry Lane the course was rumoured to be on the verge of administration and closure. He instigated a series of improvements, replacing primitive tin huts with new bars and eating areas, building the new Sedgefield Pavilion in 1991 and the Theakston Suite in 1995, while increasing the number of corporate hospitality suites. Stable facilities were improved, not only for the horses, but for the stable staff, jockeys, owners and trainers. After Scotto's death in 1996 the course’s future was uncertain, though a state-of-the-art weighing room complex was constructed in 1998, with better facilities for jockeys, officials and medical staff.

In 1999, the future of the course was questioned after a horrific incident in a novices' chase. Three horses were killed after three riderless horses (one of which was among the fatalities) ran into the remainder of the field after running up the chase track the wrong way. The racecourse had just narrowly avoided closure for the third time that century. The purchase of the course by Northern Racing, which would themselves be merged with Arena Leisure to form Arena Racing Company in 2012, was completed in 2001. Since then they have invested considerable money into the racecourse.

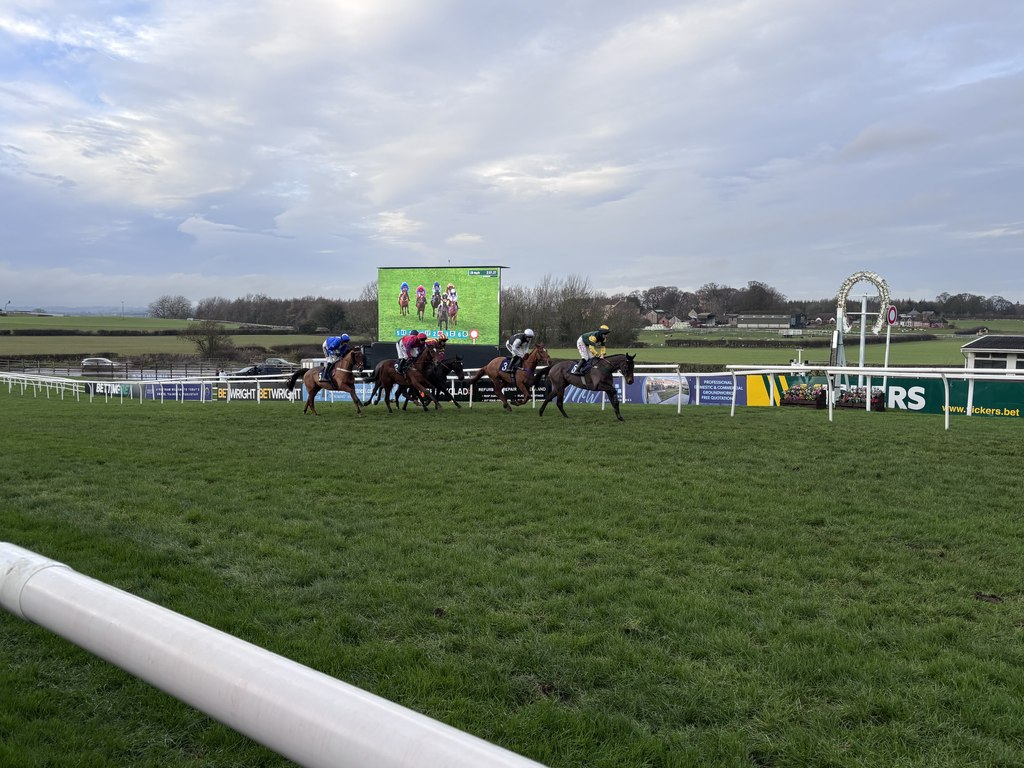
A race at the course in 2025

£4mn plans were announced in 2003 to construct an all-weather track at the racecourse whilst maintaining regular jump meetings, with the intention for the course to be ready by summer 2004. The plan would have also seen improvements to the jumps course and facilities for spectators, along with enhancements for the flood-prone stables and parade ring. Sedgefield Borough Council gave their approval, with traffic concerns from locals mitigated by expectations that crowds for the all-weather meetings would only be around 800 as opposed to the 3,000 usual for jumps fixtures. The plans never came to fruition, however, and the course still only stages National Hunt racing.

The racecourse continues to be criticised for its comparatively high fatality rate, with many serious incidents having taken place in recent years. The racecourse was deemed the worst in the country for equine fatalities in the year up to March 2008, with eleven having occurred in that time. After this, the course worked with the British Horseracing Authority to implement improvements, including an irrigation system and a reduction in the number of runners in each race. Despite this, Animal Aid demanded the course's closure in 2013 after three horses died within an hour at a meeting. Another incident occurred in 2022, when a meeting was abandoned after five of the planned seven races when two horses died after the fifth race, with the bend into the home straight deemed unsafe. In February 2023, plans were announced to upgrade the bend into the home straight by working on the entry radius and the overall camber, and jockeys gave approval to resume racing that September.

== Course characteristics ==
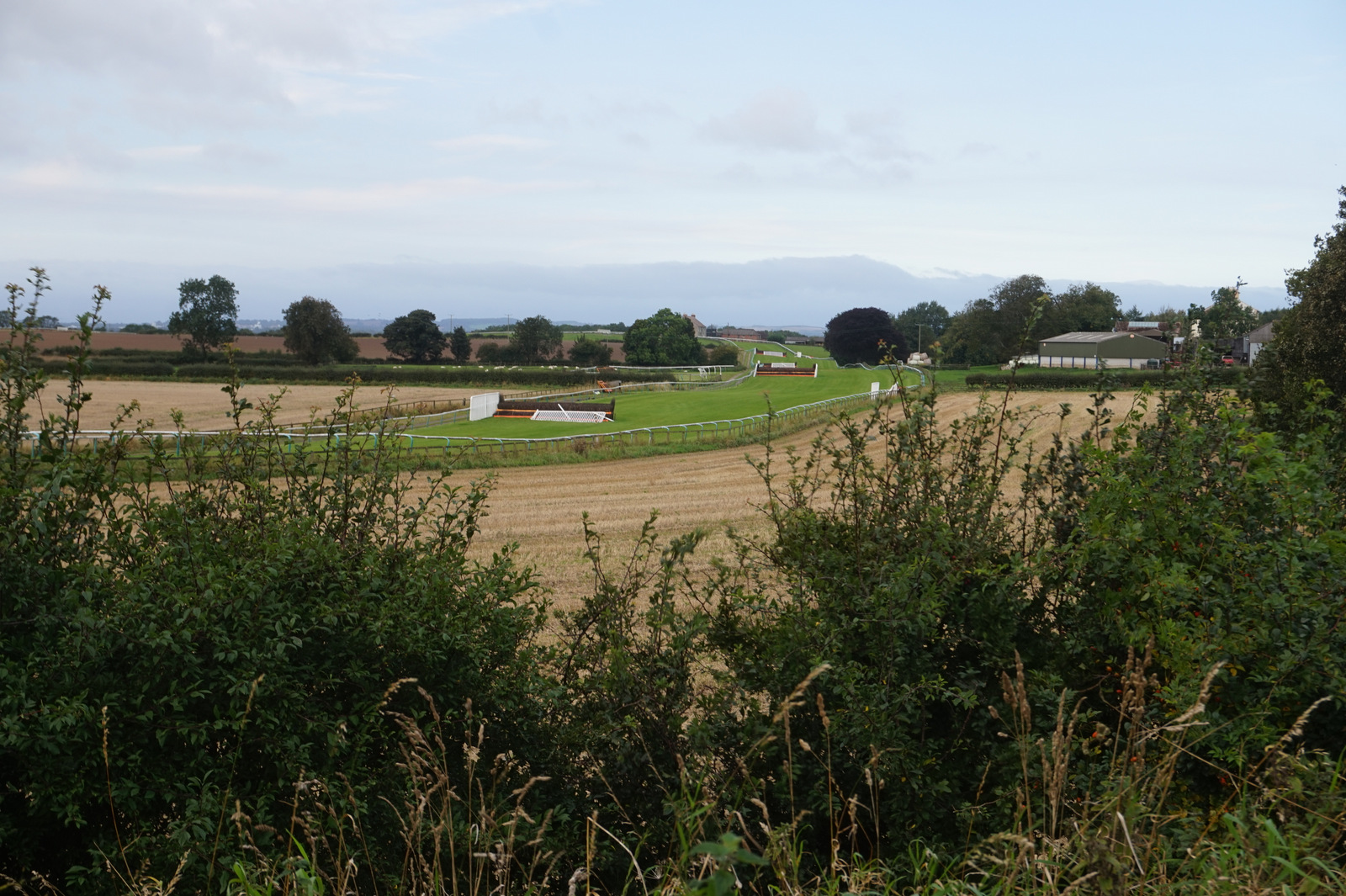
The back straight in 2020

The racecourse is a left-handed, undulating oval with tight bends but easy fences on the chase course making falls or unseats fairly rare. The run-in is fairly short and positions rarely change after the final flight, despite there being a 12ft 9in climb in the last 75 yards. A circuit is ten furlongs and there are eight fences or five hurdles to be jumped per circuit. There is a steep climb at the end of the back straight yet much of the home straight is steeply downhill. The ground can become testing in winter, when jockeys may send their horses towards the outside rail in search of better ground.

For many years the run from the last fence, an open ditch, to the winning post was 525 yards, even longer than the run-in on the Grand National course at Aintree. This was because the obstacle nearest the finishing line was a water jump, which cannot be the first or last fence in a race. In 1994 it was replaced by an ordinary plain fence, and it is now jumped on the final circuit, making a run-in of conventional length.

== Durham National ==
The racecourse generally hosts rather mediocre meetings, yet the Durham National (first staged in 1955) (Note: The headline for the Darlington & Stockton Times article used as a reference here should say 'half a century' rather than 'half a decade', and is a mistake on the part of the newspaper) is an exception. This is a steeplechase run at an October meeting over the long distance of three miles and five furlongs. One of the most popular winners in recent years was 2002 winner Fatehalkhair, a cast-off from one of the major flat race stables, who went on to win twenty races. Thirteen of them were over jumps, and they were all at Sedgefield. The 2021 winner, Hewick, meanwhile, went on to be a Galway Plate, bet365 Gold Cup, American Grand National and King George VI Chase winner.

=== Winners since 2000 ===
Year	Month	Runners	Winner	Age	Weight	SP	Jockey	Trainer
2000	May	7	Mister Muddypaws	10	11-01	8/1	Tony Dobbin	Howard Johnson
2001	May	15	Act In Time	9	10-08	14/1	R Wakley	Tom George
2002	April	9	Fatehalkhair	10	11-07	15/2	V T Keane	Brian Ellison
2003	April	7	Random Harvest	14	11-00	9/1	Alan Dempsey	Mary Reveley
2004	April	12	Lord Capitaine	10	10-06	100/30F	Graham Lee	Howard Johnson
2005	May	11	Prince Of Slane	6	09-09	16/1	Dougie Costello	Alan Swinbank
2006	May	12	Devil's Run	10	10-12	4/1JF	Paddy Aspell	John Wade
2007	May	10	Burren Moonshine	8	10-00	3/1JF	Tom O'Brien	Peter Bowen
2008	April	15	Surface To Air	7	10-05	28/1	Tom Messenger	Chris Bealby
2009	April	9	Lucky Nellerie	10	10-10	11/2	Michael O'Connell	Ferdy Murphy
2010	April	10	General Hardi	9	10-00	11/1	Brian Hughes	John Wade
2011	April	8	Simply Smashing	11	10-10	11/2	Kyle James	Philip Kirby
2012	April	6	Chamirey	9	11-00	13/2	Jason Maguire	Donald McCain
2013	April	10	Lackamon	8	11-12	11/2	Ryan Mania	Sue Smith
2014	October	12	Royale Knight	8	11-01	11/4F	Daryl Jacob	Dr Richard Newland
2015	October	7	Royale Knight	9	11-08	10/1	William Kennedy	Dr Richard Newland
2016	October	9	Buachaill Alainn	9	10-11	6/1	Sean Bowen	Peter Bowen
2017	November	13	Audacious Plan	8	11-00	6/4F	Brian Hughes	Dr Richard Newland
2018	October	7	Brian Boranha	7	11-06	7/1	Henry Brooke	Peter Niven
2019	October	10	The Caller	8	10-01	13/2	Sean Bowen	Robert Stephens
2020	October	12	Red Giant	9	10-01	16/1	Sean Quinlan	Jennie Candlish
2021	October	9	Hewick	6	11-05	3/1F	Shane Fenelon	John Joseph Hanlon
2022	October	8	All About Joe	7	11-00	7/1	Alan Doyle	Andrew Hamilton
2023	October	6	Tommie Beau	8	11-10	4/1	James Best	Seamus Mullins
2024	October	7	Jesuitique	9	10-07	11/2	Charlie Hammond	Dr Richard Newland & Jamie Insole
2025	October	6	Ivane	7	10-02	6/1	Jonathan Burke	James Owen
2026	October	7	Passengerontheship	7	10-03	9/2	Jonathan England	Sam England

== Bibliography ==
- Gill, James (1975). Racecourses of Great Britain. London: Barrie & Jenkins. ISBN 0-2142-0090-6.
