= 2011 Grand National =

Horse race held in 2011

- Grand National
- Location: Aintree Racecourse
- Date: 9 April 2011
- Winning horse: (Republic of Ireland) Ballabriggs
- Starting price: 14/1
- Jockey: (Republic of Ireland) Jason Maguire
- Trainer: (England) Donald McCain Jr.
- Owner: (England) Trevor Hemmings
- Conditions: Good (good to soft in places)

External videos
- Full replay of the 2011 Grand National Racing TV, YouTube

The 2011 Grand National (officially known as the John Smith's Grand National for sponsorship reasons) was the 164th renewal of the Grand National horse race that took place at Aintree near Liverpool, England.

The showpiece steeplechase began at 4:15 pm BST on 9 April 2011, the final day of the three-day annual meeting. The maximum permitted field of forty runners competed for prize money totalling a record £950,000, making it the highest valued National Hunt race in the United Kingdom.

Nineteen of the forty participants completed the 4½-mile course; of the 21 who did not, two suffered fatal falls on the first circuit, reigniting debates over the safety of the event, ultimately leading to changes in the following year's race.

Irish horse Ballabriggs won the race, securing the first-place prize money of £535,135 and a first Grand National win for trainer Donald McCain, Jr., the son of four-time winning trainer Ginger McCain. Owned by Trevor Hemmings, Ballabriggs was ridden by Irish jockey Jason Maguire and was sent off at odds of 14/1. The pairing completed the race in 9 minutes 1.2 seconds, the second-fastest time in Grand National history.

== Race card ==
On 2 February 2011 Aintree released the names of 102 horses submitted to enter, including 34 Irish-trained and three French-trained horses. Ten were trained by Paul Nicholls, including a leading contender in Niche Market; nine were handled by Irish trainer Willie Mullins, and three by Jonjo O'Neill, the trainer of Don't Push It, the 2010 winner. Ballabriggs, another leading contender, was trained by Donald McCain, Jr., the son of Ginger McCain who trained Red Rum to three National victories in the 1970s and returned with another winner, Amberleigh House, in 2004.

20 contenders were withdrawn in the first scratchings. After a second scratchings deadline on 24 March 74 horses remained on the list of entrants, with the top weight handicap of 11 st 10 lb allocated to last year's winner Don't Push It. The official odds on 24 March placed Mullins-trained The Midnight Club at 10/1 favourite. Backstage and Oscar Time were given joint-second favourite odds of 12/1.

At the five-day deadline on 4 April, nine further withdrawals since the second scratchings left a total of 65 contenders still in the running to compete. Nina Carberry, the sister of 1999 winner Paul Carberry, became the first female jockey to take a third ride in the Grand National. Four amateur jockeys lined up to compete. Official odds on favourite The Midnight Club were cut to 8/1, while What A Friend replaced Oscar Time as a joint-second favourite with Backstage on odds of 11/1.

On 7 April, Aintree declared the final confirmed list of 40 runners and four reserves as follows. The reserves would replace any withdrawals prior to 9 am on 8 April. None of the reserves, however, were required.

Number	Horse	Age	Weight (st-lb)	SP	Jockey	Trainer	Owner
1	Don't Push It (IRE)	11	11–10	9/1	Tony McCoy	Jonjo O'Neill	J. P. McManus
2	Tidal Bay (IRE)	10	11-09	28/1	Brian Hughes	Howard Johnson	Mr. & Mrs. Graham Wylie
3	What A Friend	8	11-06	12/1	Daryl Jacob	Paul Nicholls	Ged Mason & Sir Alex Ferguson
4	Vic Venturi (IRE)	11	11-06	50/1	Andrew Lynch	Dessie Hughes (IRE)	Seamus Dunne
5	Majestic Concorde (IRE)	8	11-05	20/1	Mr. Robbie McNamara	Dermot Weld (IRE)	Dr. Ronan Lambe
6	Or Noir de Somoza (FRA)	9	11-05	50/1	Barry Geraghty*	David Pipe	Filsal Stadeg Racing
7	Dooneys Gate (IRE)	10	11-04	50/1	Mr. Patrick Mullins	Willie Mullins (IRE)	Mrs. Jackie Mullins
8	Big Fella Thanks	9	11-01	12/1	Graham Lee	Ferdy Murphy	Crossed Fingers Partnership
9	The Tother One (IRE)	10	11-00	50/1	Mr. Ryan Mahon	Paul Nicholls	Graham Roach
10	Ballabriggs (IRE)	10	11-00	14/1	Jason Maguire	Donald McCain, Jr.	Trevor Hemmings
11	The Midnight Club (IRE)	10	10–13	15/2 F	Ruby Walsh	Willie Mullins (IRE)	Mrs. Susannah Ricci
12	Niche Market (IRE)	10	10–13	16/1	Harry Skelton	Paul Nicholls	Graham Regan
13	Silver by Nature (grey)	9	10–12	9/1	Peter Buchanan	Ms. Lucinda Russell	Geoff Brown
14	Backstage (FRA)	9	10–12	16/1	Paul Carberry	Gordon Elliott (IRE)	MPR & Capranny Syndicate
15	Chief Dan George (IRE)	11	10–12	40/1	Paddy Aspell	Jimmy Moffatt	Maurice Chapman
16	Calgary Bay (IRE)	8	10–10	33/1	Hadden Frost	Ms. Henrietta Knight	Mrs. Camilla Radford
17	Killyglen (IRE)	9	10–10	66/1	Robbie Power	Stuart Crawford (IRE)	David McCammon
18	Oscar Time (IRE)	10	10-09	14/1	Mr. Sam Waley-Cohen	Martin Lynch (IRE)	Robert Waley-Cohen & S. & M. Broughton
19	Quinz (FRA)	7	10-08	14/1	Richard Johnson	Philip Hobbs	Andrew Cohen
20	Becauseicouldntsee (IRE)	8	10-08	16/1	Davy Russell	Noel Glynn (IRE)	Noel Glynn
21	Comply or Die (IRE)	12	10-08	25/1	Timmy Murphy	David Pipe	David Johnson
22	Quolibet (FRA)	7	10-08	100/1	Mark Walsh	Jonjo O'Neill	J. P. McManus
23	Grand Slam Hero (IRE)	10	10-07	66/1	Aidan Coleman	Nigel Twiston-Davies	Walters Plant Hire Ltd.
24	State of Play	11	10-06	28/1	Paul Moloney	Evan Williams	Mr. & Mrs. William Rucker
25	King Fontaine (IRE)	8	10-06	80/1	Denis O'Regan	Malcolm Jefferson	Trevor Hemmings
26	In Compliance (IRE)	11	10-05	66/1	Leighton Aspell	Dessie Hughes (IRE)	Westerly Breeze Syndicate
27	Hello Bud (IRE)	13	10-05	20/1	Sam Twiston-Davies	Nigel Twiston-Davies	Seamus Murphy
28	West End Rocker (IRE)	9	10-05	33/1	Robert Thornton	Alan King	Barry Winfield & Tim Leadbeater
29	Santa's Son (IRE)	11	10-05	100/1	Jamie Moore	Howard Johnson	Douglas Pryde & Jim Beaumont
30	Bluesea Cracker (mare) (IRE)	9	10-04	25/1	Andrew McNamara	James Motherway (IRE)	J. P. McManus
31	That's Rhythm (FRA)	11	10-04	50/1	James Reveley	Martin Todhunter	Don't Tell Henry
32	Surface to Air	10	10-04	100/1	Tom Messenger	Chris Bealby	Tim Urry
33	Piraya (FRA)	8	10-04	100/1	Johnny Farrelly	David Pipe	Terry Neill
34	Can't Buy Time (IRE)	9	10-04	33/1	Richie McLernon	Jonjo O'Neill	J. P. McManus
35	Character Building (IRE)	11	10-04	25/1	Ms. Nina Carberry	John Quinn	Patricia Thompson
36	Ornais (FRA)	9	10-04	100/1	Nick Scholfield	Paul Nicholls	The Stewart family
37	Arbor Supreme (IRE)	9	10-03	20/1	David Casey	Willie Mullins (IRE)	J. P. McManus
38	Royal Rosa (FRA)	12	10-03	100/1	Paul Gallagher	Howard Johnson	Mr. & Mrs. Graham Wylie
39	Skippers Brig (IRE)	10	10-02	33/1	Dominic Elsworth	Nicky Richards	Ashelybank Investments Ltd.
40	Golden Kite (IRE)	9	10-02	66/1	Shane Hassett	Adrian Maguire (IRE)	Dr. Anthony Calnan
R1	Always Waining (IRE)	10	10-02			Peter Bowen	Mr. & Mrs. Peter Douglas
R2	Faasel (IRE)	10	10-01			David Pipe	Jim Ennis
R3	Le Beau Bai (FRA)	8	10-01			Richard Lee	Glass Half Full Syndicate
R4	Giles Cross (IRE)	9	10-00			Victor Dartnall	KCMS Partnership

*Barry Geraghty rode Or Noir de Somoza after his original jockey, Tom Scudamore, withdrew due to an injury sustained in a race the day prior to the National.

== Finishing order ==
Placed horses

1: Ballabriggs

2: Oscar Time

3: Don't Push It

4: State Of Play

Ten-year-old Ballabriggs led for much of the race, and the gelding eventually saw off a strong run-in challenge from amateur jockey Sam Waley-Cohen on Oscar Time who secured second place. Third was 2010 winner Tony McCoy on Don't Push It, twelve lengths behind the second. 15/2 favourite The Midnight Club made a mistake at the third fence and finished sixth.

State of Play, the eleven-year-old 28/1 shot trained by Welshman Evan Williams, finished in the top four for the third successive National.

Nineteen runners completed the course, including three of the six 100/1 shots. This was the highest number of finishers since 2005 when twenty-one horses passed the finishing post.

Position	Horse	Jockey	SP	Distance	Prize money
1	Ballabriggs	Jason Maguire	14/1	Won by 2¼ lengths	£535,135
2	Oscar Time	Mr. Sam Waley-Cohen	14/1	12 lengths	£201,590
3	Don't Push It	Tony McCoy	9/1	2 lengths	£100,890
4	State of Play	Paul Moloney	28/1	7 lengths	£50,445
5	Niche Market	Harry Skelton	16/1	4 lengths	£25,270
6	The Midnight Club	Ruby Walsh	15/2 F	13 lengths	£12,635
7	Big Fella Thanks	Graham Lee	12/1	A head	£6,270
8	Surface to Air	Tom Messenger	100/1	19 lengths	£3,230
9	Skippers Brig	Dominic Elsworth	33/1	8 lengths	
10	Backstage	Paul Carberry	16/1	½ length	
11	King Fontaine	Denis O'Regan	80/1	25 lengths	
12	Silver by Nature	Peter Buchanan	9/1	5 lengths	
13	In Compliance	Leighton Aspell	66/1	8 lengths	
14	Bluesea Cracker	Andrew McNamara	25/1	16 lengths	
15	Character Building	Ms. Nina Carberry	25/1	12 lengths	
16	Golden Kite	Shane Hassett	66/1	A distance	
17	Chief Dan George	Paddy Aspell	40/1	20 lengths	
18	Royal Rosa	Paul Gallagher	100/1	A distance	
19	Piraya	Johnny Farrelly	100/1	Last to complete	

== Non-finishers ==
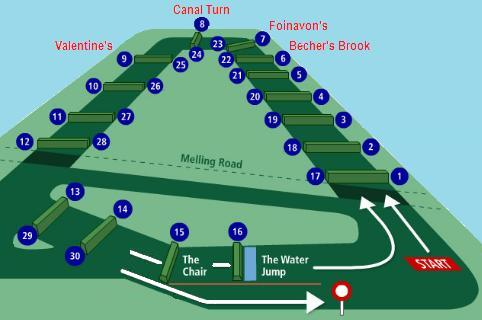
Overview of the 4½-mile National Course at Aintree with thirty fences.

Ten horses fell during the race, four unseated their riders, two were brought down by other fallers and five were pulled up.

The 100/1 outsider Santa's Son had led the field over the Canal Turn, but the short-distance runner eventually fell out of contention and jockey Jamie Moore pulled him up before the 27th fence. Killyglen fell at the 27th, having been close to leader Ballabriggs at the beginning of the second circuit.

Ornais and Dooneys Gate both suffered fatal falls on the first circuit. Ornais incurred a cervical fracture at the fourth fence (a plain 4 ft 10-inch obstacle) and Dooneys Gate fractured his thoracolumbar at fence six (the 5 ft Becher's Brook). Aintree had made significant modifications to its National Course in recent years, including improving veterinary facilities and reducing the severity of some fences, but another notable change was highlighted in this race – that the course has been widened to allow more fences to be bypassed if necessary. As the remaining contenders on the second circuit approached the 20th fence, arrowed signposts and marshals waving chequered flags signalled them to bypass on the outside as Ornais' body was covered by a tarpaulin on the landing side. Two jumps later and they were again diverted, this time around the famous Becher's Brook, where veterinary staff attended to Dooneys Gate. This was the first time since the modern course was finalised in the 1880s that only 28 fences were jumped.

Fence	Horse	Jockey	SP	Fate
1	That's Rhythm	James Reveley	50/1	Fell
2	Becauseicouldntsee	Davy Russell	16/1	Fell
2	Vic Venturi	Andrew Lynch	50/1	Brought down
4	Calgary Bay	Hadden Frost	33/1	Fell
4	Ornais	Nick Scholfield	100/1	Fell
6 (Becher's Brook)	Or Noir de Somoza	Barry Geraghty	50/1	Fell
6 (Becher's Brook)	Dooneys Gate	Mr. Patrick Mullins	50/1	Fell
6 (Becher's Brook)	The Tother One	Mr. Ryan Mahon	50/1	Fell
6 (Becher's Brook)	West End Rocker	Robert Thornton	33/1	Brought down
10	Tidal Bay	Brian Hughes	28/1	Unseated rider
11	Quoilbet	Mark Walsh	100/1	Unseated rider
13	Grand Slam Hero	Aidan Coleman	66/1	Fell
15 (The Chair)	Quinz	Richard Johnson	14/1	Pulled up
18	Can't Buy Time	Richie McLernon	33/1	Fell
24 (Canal Turn)	Majestic Concorde	Mr. Robbie McNamara	20/1	Unseated rider
27	What A Friend	Daryl Jacob	12/1	Pulled up
27	Santa's Son	Jamie Moore	100/1	Pulled up
27	Killyglen	Robert Power	66/1	Fell
28	Comply or Die	Timmy Murphy	25/1	Pulled up
28	Arbor Supreme	David Casey	20/1	Fell
29	Hello Bud	Sam Twiston-Davies	20/1	Pulled up

== Broadcasting ==
The Grand National has the status of being an event of significant national interest within the United Kingdom and thus is listed on the Ofcom Code on Sports and Other Listed and Designated Events. The race therefore must be covered live on free-to-air terrestrial television in the UK. The BBC aired the race on radio for the 80th consecutive year and on television for the 52nd year.

As they race towards the elbow, Ballabriggs is being tackled now by Oscar Time... but Jason Maguire is getting another tune out of Ballabriggs! Ballabriggs with a hundred yards left to go, he's three lengths in front, he's going to outstay them I reckon. He's drifting towards the outside, but he's done enough to win. Ballabriggs and Donald McCain, it's the McCain family back with another National. Ballabriggs, Jason Maguire the winner!

— BBC commentator Jim McGrath describes the climax of the race

Clare Balding presented the BBC's television coverage, supported by Rishi Persad and retired jockey Richard Pitman, which was broadcast on BBC One and, for the second year, BBC HD. Former National-winning jockeys Richard Dunwoody and Mick Fitzgerald provided expert analysis, while betting news was provided by Gary Wiltshire and John Parrott. Suzi Perry was due to be providing soundbites from spectators but did not take part in the programme. Her place was taken by last-minute replacement Dan Walker who had been at Aintree to present Football Focus, aired prior to the National.

The race commentary team was led by Jim McGrath, who called the winner home for the 14th consecutive year; he was supported by Ian Bartlett and Darren Owen.

As well as being streamed to UK viewers on BBC Online, BBC Radio 5 Live also aired the race, presented by Mark Chapman.

The BBC later received some criticism for failing to mention the deaths of Ornais and Dooneys Gate until the end of its broadcast.

== Aftermath ==
The unusually warm and sunny weather conditions were credited with helping the 2011 meeting set a Grand National attendance record. A crowd of 70,291 people attended the main Saturday race day, and a total of 153,583 attended over the course of the three-day meeting, beating the previous record of 151,660 set in 2005.

The Grand National is always a major event for bookmakers, particularly in the United Kingdom. An estimated £300 million in bets were said to have been placed on the 2011 race, including some from as far afield as Australia, Bermuda and Kazakhstan, with British troops in Afghanistan also joining in. It is estimated that nearly half of the adult population of the UK bets on the Grand National.

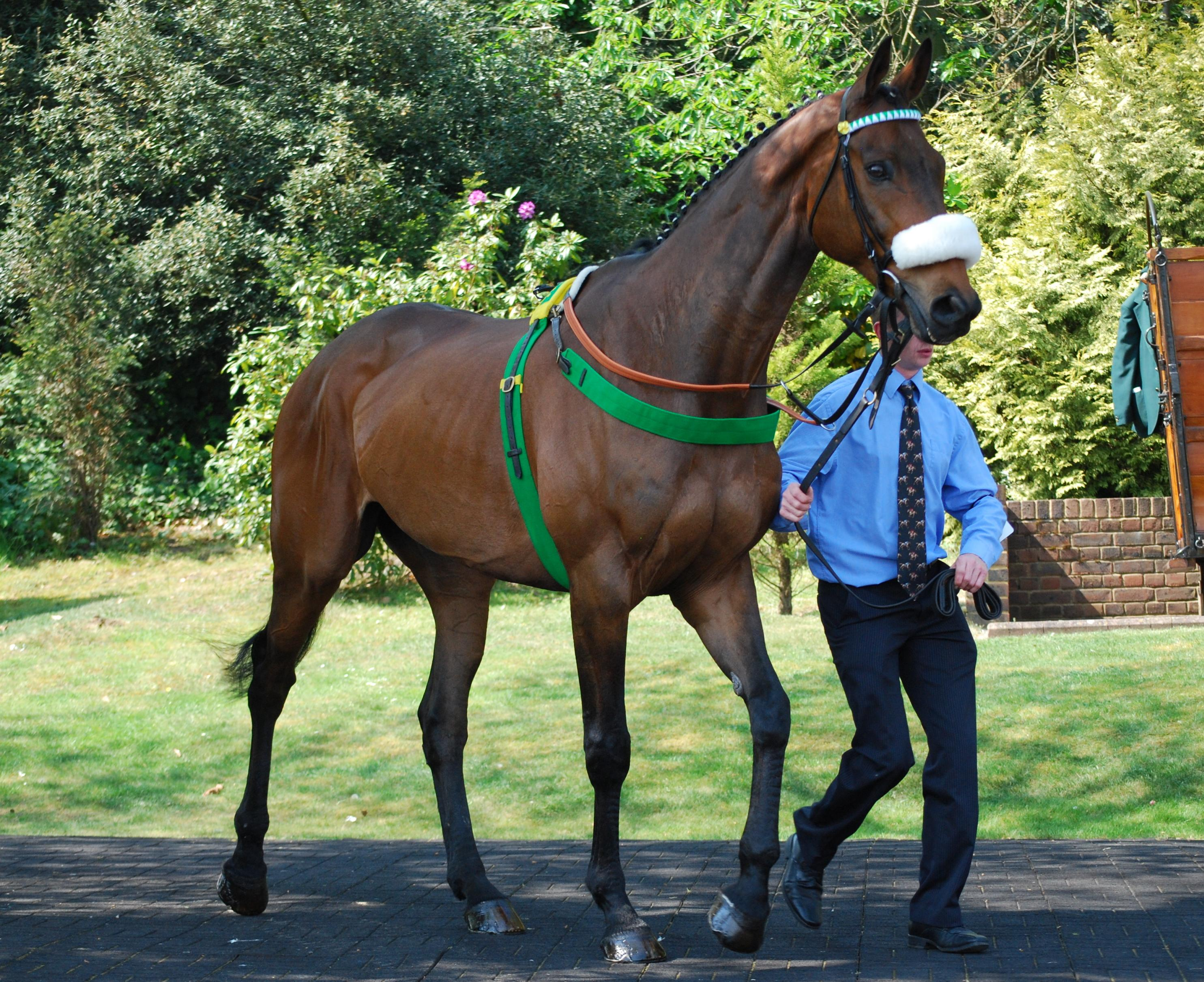
Ballabriggs, pictured two weeks after his Grand National win.

The race received a significant amount of negative media coverage over the two equine fatalities, which were more publicly noticeable than in prior Nationals due to two fences being bypassed for the first time. Those watching the race on television were given clear views of the tarpaulin-covered body of Ornais at the fourth fence, and an aerial shot at Becher's showed veterinary staff attending to the fatally injured Dooneys Gate, while the remaining runners diverted around them.

Andrew Taylor, director of the animal rights group Animal Aid, called for an outright ban of the Grand National, saying: "It's a deliberately hazardous, challenging and predictably lethal event." The RSPCA's equine consultant David Muir stated: "I was gutted that two horses died... What I will do now is go back and have a look at each element, with the BHA and the racecourse management, to see if the jump contributed to what happened, look at the take-off and landing side and so on, and see if the evidence suggests something can be done about it. I'm trying to make the race better, safer where I can, but the one thing I can never do is eliminate risk: that's always going to be there." Muir did however add: "There's no way I'm going to get the National banned."

Aintree's managing director Julian Thick said: "We are desperately sad at the accidents during the running of the Grand National today and our thoughts go out to the connections of Ornais and Dooneys Gate... Only the best horses and the best jockeys are allowed to enter and all horses are inspected by the vet when they arrive at Aintree to ensure that they are fit to race. This year we had 20 horse-catchers, at least two attendants at each of the 16 fences, four stewards to inspect the course, two BHA course inspectors, ten vets, 50 ground staff and 35 ground repair staff... We work closely with animal welfare organisations, such as the RSPCA and World Horse Welfare, to make sure we are up to date with the latest thinking and research... and to make sure that the horses are looked after properly and that the race is run as safely as possible."

Veteran trainer Ginger McCain queried the suggestion of reducing the size of the fences in the aftermath of the race. McCain said: "You don't make things better by making it easier. Its speed that does the damage." Champion jockey Tony McCoy also defended the National, saying, "I personally don't think the sport could be in any better shape for horses or jockeys." Ornais's owner, Andy Stewart, later said: "We're still grieving but I think this whole hyped up situation regarding the Grand National is totally wrong... National Hunt racing is safer and compliant with every single sport that goes along. My son snowboarded in France and, unfortunately, he had an accident and he'll never walk again. Why don't we just get on with it and enjoy the sport?"

Winning jockey Jason Maguire was subsequently handed a five-day ban by the stewards for excessive use of the whip on Ballabriggs in the closing stages and the horse required oxygen after crossing the line.

== See also ==
- Horseracing in Great Britain
- List of British National Hunt races
- 2011 Cheltenham Gold Cup
