= Finale Juvenile Hurdle =

Hurdle horse race in Britain

Finale Juvenile Hurdle
2025
Tenter Le Tout	Klycot	Kaldoun Des Rocs

Previous years
2024
Nietzsche Has	Marche D'aligre	Torrent
2023
Salver	Balboa	Authoceltic
2022
Comfort Zone	Dixon Cove	Perseus Way
2021
Porticello	Saint Segal	Forever William

2020-2011
2020
Adagio	Nassalam	Houx Gris
2019
Allmankind	Cerberus	Nordano
2018
Quel Destin	Adjali	Arverne
2018
We Have A Dream	Sussex Ranger	Mercenaire
2016
Defi Du Seuil	Evening Hush	Dolos
2015
Adrien Du Pont	Chic Name	Coo Star Sivola
2014
Bristol De Mai	Karezak	The Wallace Line
2013
Le Rocher	Kentucky Hyden	Violet Dancer
2012
Ruacana	Caid Du Berlais	Megalypos
2011
Hollow Tree	Countrywide Flame	Secret Edge

2010-2001
2010
Marsh Warbler	Houblon Des Obeaux	Smad Place
2009
Me Voici	Sang Bleu	Bocamix
2008
Walkon	Pepite De Soleil	Reve De Sivola
2007
Franchoek	Tatenen	Serabad
2006
Good Bye Simon	Ned Ludd	Warne's Way
2005
Blue Shark	Turko	Patman Du Charmil
2004
Phar Bleu	Biscar Two	Habitual Dancer
2003
Sunray	Mondul	Adopted Hero
2002
Nas Na Riogh	Lewis Island	Lougaroo
2001
Tempo d'Or	Live The Dream	Hawkes Run

2000-1991
2000
Jair du Cochet	Bilboa	Spirit of Park
1999
Mister Banjo	Bangalore	Lord Brex
1998
Hunt Hill	Miss Orphan	Legend of Love
1997
Rainwatch	Borazon	Kilbride Lad
1993
Mysilv	Burnt Imp	Kadastrof
1991
Good Profile	None So Brave	Pontynyswen

1990-1989
1989
Crystal Heights	Gay Ruffian	Child of the Mist

The Finale Juvenile Hurdle is a Grade 2 National Hunt hurdle race in Great Britain which is open to horses aged three years. It is run at Chepstow over a distance of about 2 miles (2 miles and 11 yards, or 3,228 metres), and during its running there are eight hurdles to be jumped. The race is for novice hurdlers, and it is scheduled to take place each year during the Welsh Grand National meeting in late December. On occasions when the race has been postponed to January of the following year, the runners are aged four years.

The race carried Grade 1 status until the 2021 running. It was downgraded to Grade 2 by the British Horseracing Authority in 2022.

== Records ==
Leading jockey since 1971 (3 wins):

- Mick Fitzgerald – Mister Banjo (1999), Blue Shark (2005), Good Bye Simon (2006)
- Richard Johnson – Franchoek (2007), Le Rocher (2013), Defi Du Seuil (2016)
- Daryl Jacob – Me Voici (2009), Bristol De Mai (2014), We Have A Dream (2017)

Leading trainer since 1971 (4 wins):

- Nicky Henderson – Mister Banjo (1999), Nas Na Riogh (2002), Blue Shark (2005), We Have A Dream (2017)

== Winners since 1971 ==
Year	Winner	Jockey	Trainer
1971	Ballytruckle	Graham Thorner	David Gandolfo
1972	Lightning Trial	Bill Smith	Fred Rimell
1973	Fighting Kate	Robin Dickin	Frenchie Nicholson
1974	Philorninsky	Mick Wagner	Bill Marshall
1975	Tiepolino	Bob Champion	Josh Gifford
1976	Decent Fellow	Richard Linley	Toby Balding
1977	Rodman	John Francome	Fred Winter
1978	Abandoned because of snow
1979	Good Ruler	Ray Goldstein	G Beeson
1980	Broadsword	Peter Scudamore	David Nicholson
1981	Brave Hussar	Andy Turnell	Bob Turnell
1982	Primrolla	Hywel Davies	David Nicholson
1983	Dodgy Future	Mark Perrett	Stan Mellor
1984	Out of The Gloom	Jonjo O'Neill	Reg Hollinshead
1985	The Footman	Graham Bradley	David Elsworth
1986	High Knowl	Peter Scudamore	Martin Pipe
1987	South Parade	Graham Bradley	Toby Balding
1988	Enemy Action	Peter Scudamore	Martin Pipe
1989	Crystal Heights	Brendan Powell	Jackie Retter
1990	Hopscotch	Jonothan Lower	Martin Pipe
1991	Good Profile	Lorcan Wyer	George M. Moore
1992	Dare to Dream	David Bridgwater	Reg Akehurst
1993	Mysilv	Adrian Maguire	David Nicholson
1994	Abandoned due to waterlogging
1995	Abandoned due to frost
1996	Abandoned due to frost
1997	Rainwatch	Tony McCoy	Martin Pipe
1998	Hunt Hill	Adrian Maguire	Jonjo O'Neill
1999	Mister Banjo	Mick Fitzgerald	Nicky Henderson
2000	Jair du Cochet	Jacques Ricou	Guillaume Macaire
2001	Tempo d'Or	Benoît Gicquel	Guillaume Macaire
2002	Nas Na Riogh	Marcus Foley	Nicky Henderson
2003	Sunray	Andrew Thornton	Evan Williams
2004	Phar Bleu	Tony McCoy	Georgie Browne
2005	Blue Shark	Mick Fitzgerald	Nicky Henderson
2006	Good Bye Simon	Mick Fitzgerald	Thierry Doumen
2007	Franchoek	Richard Johnson	Alan King
2008	Walkon	Robert Thornton	Alan King
2009	Me Voici	Daryl Jacob	Nick Williams
2010 (Note: The "2010" running took place in January 2011 after the original fixture was abandoned due to waterlogging)	Marsh Warbler	Fearghal Davis	Brian Ellison
2011	Hollow Tree	Timmy Murphy	Donald McCain Jr
2012 (Note: The "2012" running took place in January 2013 after the original fixture was abandoned due to waterlogging)	Ruacana	Denis O'Regan	John Ferguson
2013	Le Rocher	Richard Johnson	Nick Williams
2014	Bristol De Mai	Daryl Jacob	Nigel Twiston-Davies
2015 (Note: The "2015" running took place in January 2016 after the original fixture was abandoned due to waterlogging)	Adrien Du Pont	Nick Scholfield	Paul Nicholls
2016	Defi Du Seuil	Richard Johnson	Philip Hobbs
2017 (Note: The "2017" running took place in January 2018 after the original fixture was abandoned due to waterlogging)	We Have A Dream	Daryl Jacob	Nicky Henderson
2018	Quel Destin	Sam Twiston-Davies	Paul Nicholls
2019	Allmankind	Harry Skelton	Dan Skelton
2020 (Note: The "2020" running took place in January 2021 after the original fixture was abandoned due to waterlogging)	Adagio	Tom Scudamore	David Pipe
2021	Porticello	Jamie Moore	Gary Moore
2022	Comfort Zone	Jonjo O'Neill Jr	Joseph O'Brien
2023	Salver	Caoilin Quinn	Gary Moore
2024	Nietzsche Has	Ludovic Philipperon	Marcel Rolland
2025	Tenter Le Tout	Gavin Sheehan	Chester Williams

== See also ==
- Horse racing in Great Britain
- List of British National Hunt races
