= Silver Trophy Handicap Hurdle =

Hurdle horse race in Britain

- Class: Class 2
- Location: Chepstow Racecourse; Monmouthshire, Wales
- Inaugurated: 1988
- Race type: Hurdle
- Sponsor: Wasdell Group
- Website: Chepstow

Race information
- Distance: 2m 3f 100y (3,914 metres)
- Surface: Turf
- Track: Left-handed
- Qualification: Four-years-old and up
- Weight: Handicap
- Purse: £75,000 (2025); 1st: £39,023

Silver Trophy Handicap Hurdle
2026
Daylatedollarshort	Perseus Way	Our Guide

Previous years
2025
Rambo	Paggane	Royal Infantry
2024
Josh The Boss	Doyen Quest	Take No Chances
2023
Pyramid Place	Blow Your Wad	Sonigino
2022
Knappers Hill	Lord Baddesley	Broomfield Burg
2021
Orbys Legend	Didtheyleaveuoutto	Amour de Nuit

2020-2011
2020
Tea Clipper	Flash The Steel	Flinck
2019
Flash The Steel	Champagne Court	Imperial Aura
2018
Garo De Juilley	Point Of Principle	Whatmore
2017
Court Minstrel	Sam Spinner	Peak To Peak
2016
Ballyoptic	Crimson Ark	Forever Field
2015
Court Minstrel	Rock The Kasbah	Hurricane Hollow
2014
Shelford	Aubusson	Vieux Lion Rouge
2013
Shammick Boy	Lamb Or Cod	Kaylif Aramis
2012
Lamb Or Cod	Arthurian Legend	Tony Star
2011
Arthurian Legend	Global Power	Robinson Collonges

2010-2001
2010
Any Given Day	Dantari	Restless Harry
2009
Mr Thriller	Golan Way	Alfie Sherrin
2008
Irish Legend	King Caine	Aimigayle
2007
Don't Push It	Lead On	Cream Cracker
2006
Taranis	Saltango	Nathos
2005
Lacdoudal	Howle Hill	Spring Pursuit
2004
Mistanoora	Big Moment	Mr Ed
2003
Moving Earth	Shamsan	Celtic Star
2002
Yeoman's Point	Chicago Bulls	Tensile
2001
Majed	Legal Lunch	Serenus

2000-1990
2000
Young Spartacus	Gunnerblong	Springfield Scally
1999
Carlovent	Capitaine Leau	Mothers Help
1998
Mister Morose	L'Opera	Buckhouse Boy
1997
Marello	Shooting Light	Potentate
1996
Castle Sweep	Mytton's Choice	Silver Shred
1995
Jibber The Kibber	Conquering Leader	Silver Wedge
1994
Her Honour	Hebridean	Couture Stockings
1993
Triple Witching	Avro Anson	Taroudant
1992
Mighty Mogul	Petosku	Dara Doone
1991
Danny Harrold	The Demon Barber	Ambuscade
1990
Bradbury Star	Peanuts Pet	Philosophos

The Wasdell Group Silver Trophy Handicap Hurdle is a Class 2 National Hunt hurdle race in Great Britain which is open to horses aged four years or older. It is run at Chepstow over a distance of about 2 miles and 3½ furlongs (2 miles 3 furlong and 100 yards, or 3,914 metres). It is a handicap race, and it is scheduled to take place each year in October. Many top class horses have won the race including Don't Push It in 2007. The Jonjo O'Neill trained gelding went on to win the Grand National in 2010.

The race was first run in 1988 and was awarded Grade 3 status in 2011. It is the feature race on day two of Chepstow's October Jumps Season Opener meeting. It was downgraded to Class 2 status by the British Horseracing Authority in 2022.

== Winners ==
Year	Winner	Age	Weight	Jockey	Trainer
1988	Buckskin's Best	6	10-03	Richard Dunwoody	Robin Dickin
1989	Pipers Copse	7	10-04	Mark Perrett	Guy Harwood
1990	Bradbury Star	5	10–11	Richard Rowe	Josh Gifford
1991	Danny Harrold	7	11-10	Mark Pitman	Jenny Pitman
1992	Mighty Mogul	5	10–12	Richard Dunwoody	David Nicholson
1993	Triple Witching	7	10–10	Adrian Maguire	David Nicholson
1994	Her Honour	5	10-01	Richard Dunwoody	Martin Pipe
1995	Jibber The Kibber	6	10-00	Rodney Farrant	Jenny Pitman
1996	Castle Sweep	5	10-10	Richard Johnson	David Nicholson
1997	Marello	6	10–13	Peter Niven	Mary Reveley
1998	Mister Morose	8	10-05	Carl Llewellyn	Nigel Twiston-Davies
1999	Carlovent	4	10-07	David Casey	Martin Pipe
2000	Young Spartacus	7	11-04	Mark Bradburne	Henry Daly
2001	Majed	5	10-03	Tony McCoy	Martin Pipe
2002	Yeoman's Point	6	11-02	Charlie Swan	Christy Roche
2003	Hasty Prince	5	11-03	Liam Cooper	Jonjo O'Neill
2004	Mistanoora	5	11-10	Carl Llewellyn	Nigel Twiston-Davies
2005	Lacdoudal	6	10-06	Richard Johnson	Philip Hobbs
2006	Taranis	5	10-00	Ruby Walsh	Paul Nicholls
2007	Don't Push It	7	10–08	Noel Fehily	Jonjo O'Neill
2008	Irish Legend	8	10-10	Michael Murphy	Craig Roberts
2009	Mr Thriller	4	10–12	J W Farrelly	David Pipe
2010	Any Given Day	5	11-01	Henry Brooke	Donald McCain
2011	Arthurian Legend	6	10-06	Richard Johnson	Philip Hobbs
2012	Lamb Or Cod	5	10-05	James Best	Philip Hobbs
2013	Shammick Boy	8	10–13	Jack Doyle	Victor Dartnall
2014	Shelford	5	10-04	Harry Skelton	Dan Skelton
2015	Court Minstrel	8	11–12	Paul Moloney	Evan Williams
2016	Ballyoptic	6	11-00	Ryan Hatch	Nigel Twiston-Davies
2017	Court Minstrel	10	11-04	Mitchell Bastyan	Evan Williams
2018	Garo De Juilley	6	11-02	Paddy Brennan	Sophie Leech
2019	Flash The Steel	7	10-05	Harry Skelton	Dan Skelton
2020	Tea Clipper	5	10-13	Jonathan Burke	Tom Lacey
2021	Orbys Legend	5	11-00	Tom O'Brien	Philip Hobbs
2022	Knappers Hill	6	11-10	Harry Cobden	Paul Nicholls
2023	Pyramid Place	6	10-08	Bradley Harris	Milton Harris
2024	Josh The Boss	5	10-07	Jamie Neild	Nigel Twiston-Davies
2025	Rambo T	8	11-05	Sean Bowen	Olly Murphy
2026	Daylatedollarshort	5	10-07	Sean Bowen	Olly Murphy

== See also ==
- Horse racing in Great Britain
- List of British National Hunt races
