= Hewick (horse) =

Irish-bred Thoroughbred racehorse

- Sire: Virtual
- Grandsire: Pivotal
- Dam: Ballyburn Rose
- Damsire: Oscar
- Sex: Gelding
- Foaled: 17 April 2015
- Country: Ireland
- Colour: Bay
- Breeder: William Quinn
- Owner: TJ McDonald
- Trainer: John "Shark" Hanlon
- Record: 51: 12-8-3
- Earnings: £792,862

Major wins
- Galway Plate (2022); Bet365 Gold Cup (2022); Grand National Hurdle Stakes (2022); Oaksey Chase (2023); King George VI Chase (2023)

Honours
- American Champion Steeplechase Horse (2022)
- Last updated on 11 July 2026

Hewick (foaled 17 April 2015) is an Irish-bred and trained Thoroughbred racehorse who raced under National Hunt rules. He was a specialist long-distance steeplechaser known for his victories in the 2022 American Grand National and 2023 King George VI Chase.

== Background ==
Hewick is a bay gelding, with a narrow white blaze bred in Ireland by William Quinn. At 16 hands, he is small for a steeplechaser. His sire, Virtual, won the Lockinge Stakes; his dam, Ballyburn Rose, was unraced. Hewick was bought as a two-year-old at Goresbridge Sales for €850 (about £800) and went into training with John Joseph "Shark" Hanlon at his County Carlow yard.

== Racing career ==
Hewick began his racing career as a four-year-old in early 2019 with three appearances in point-to-points. On two occasions he fell, and on one occasion unseated his jockey. He then ran 11 times over hurdles before securing his first victory at Kilbeggan in September 2020. This was followed two weeks later by another at Navan. In June 2021 he raced over fences for the first time, winning a beginners' chase at Clonmel. Hewick raced in Britain for the first time in September 2021, coming second in a handicap chase at Perth. In October 2021 he won the 3m 5f Durham National at Sedgefield, ridden by conditional jockey Shane Fenelon. In April 2022, ridden by conditional jockey Jordan Gainford and starting as a 16/1 outsider, he won the Grade 3 Bet365 Gold Cup at Sandown, beating Musical Slave and favourite Kitty's Light by eight lengths. Hewick and Gainford, who had by this time lost his claim, then went on to win the Galway Plate in July 2022 before travelling to the United States to compete in the 2m 5f Grand National Hurdle Stakes at Far Hills, New Jersey. Ridden by Gainford and starting as 21/10 second favourite, Hewick beat Noah And The Ark by 11½ lengths to win. After the race, Hanlon said: "This horse is a legend and is starting to get a huge following".

The eight-year-old's first race of 2023 was the Cheltenham Gold Cup at the Cheltenham Festival in March. He started at 40/1 in a field of thirteen, again ridden by Gainford, and fell at the second last fence when racing in second position. Ridden by Rachael Blackmore as Gainford was side-lined by injury, Hewick then won the Grade 2 Oaksey Chase over 2m 6½f at Sandown in April. His next race was the French Champion Hurdle at Auteuil. Ridden by Blackmore in ground softer than he likes, he finished in fourth place. In August he had a disappointing run in the Galway Plate under Brian Hughes, finishing fourteenth in a field of 22, 27 lengths behind the winner. After a break of nearly five months, Hewick won the Grade 1 King George VI Chase at Kempton on Boxing Day. Gavin Sheehan was riding him for the first time, as Gainford was again injured and Blackmore was riding at Leopardstown. Starting at 12/1 in a field of six, he raced in last place for much of the 3 miles and appeared to be out of contention when he rallied and eventually overtook leaders Bravemansgame and Allaho on the short run-in to win by 1½ lengths. His victory featured in episode 1 of the ITV1 docuseries Champions: Full Gallop, aired in July 2024. Hewick's second attempt at the Cheltenham Gold Cup was thwarted due to unsuitably soft ground. He was then scratched from the Aintree Grand National, in which he had been allocated top weight, and aimed at the Aintree Bowl. As the ground was soft, he ran in the Liverpool Hurdle instead. Reunited with Gainford, he finished 6th of the eleven runners, beaten 25 lengths by Strong Leader. His next outing was on 1 May in the Punchestown Gold Cup where he finished third behind Fastorslow and odds-on favourite Galopin Des Champs. Later in May there was a trip to France to contest the Grande Course de Haies d'Auteuil (French Champion Hurdle) in Paris, where he finished second, one and a half lengths behind Losange Bleu. His trainer said after the race: "He's run an absolute cracker. He jumped well, did everything and a better horse beat us. I know we're better over fences but that shows what I have, he's a great horse."

Hewick began his 2024/25 campaign on 16 October with third place in the Grade 3 BetVictor Chase at Punchestown. He was then entered in two Grade 1 races in November, before his trainer's six-month ban started on 1 December. Hanlon's ban had been imposed for bringing racing into disrepute, after he was filmed by a member of the public transporting a dead horse in a trailer behind one of his branded lorries. Hanlon said that Hewick had kept his spirits up: "He's the horse who's kept the show on the road. When I need to talk to somebody I go out and pour my heart out to him."

Hewick was supplemented into the Ladbrokes Champion Chase at Down Royal on 2 November. In a field of five, he set off at 4/1 and led until the last fence, being beaten half a length by Envoi Allen at 3/1, with odds-on favourite Gerri Colombe thirteen lengths behind in third place. Hanlon announced himself pleased with Hewick's performance, saying: "I said earlier that he is a better horse this year, and we will take on the big boys again at Kempton at Christmas. My aim after that will be the Gold Cup and the Grand National." Gainford was given a nine-day suspension for his use of the whip on Hewick. For his next two races, he was trained by Tara Lee Cogan, who had taken over Hanlon's licence during the latter's suspension. He came fifth in the Savills Hurdle and seventh in the Irish Gold Cup, both at Leopardstown. Hewick was entered in the Gold Cup at Cheltenham in March, but was withdrawn when Hanlon, who by this time had completed his suspension, decided that the ground was too soft. Instead, he ran in a hurdle race at Thurles on 15 March, starting as favourite and winning by five lengths under his work rider, trainer's son Paddy Hanlon.

For his next race, the 2025 Grand National, Hewick was re-united with Sheehan. Starting at odds of 14/1 and carrying 11st 7lb, Hewick raced prominently and jumped well, except for a mistake at the Canal Turn on the second circuit. He was outpaced after the second last fence and finished in eighth place, eighteen-and-a-half lengths behind winner Nick Rockett, winning £15,000 in prize money. For his final race of the season, Hewick returned to Auteuil for a third attempt at the French Champion Hurdle, but, in very soft ground, trailed in seventh of the eight runners.

Hewick began the 2025/26 season with a win in a hurdle race at Thurles under Paddy Hanlon. He then started favourite in the Charlie Hall Chase but, ridden by Sheehan, finished fourth, 28 lengths behind the winner. Hewick had a further four starts over hurdles during the season. Ridden by Paddy Hanlon, he finished unplaced in the Long Distance Hurdle, the Stayers' Hurdle and a Listed handicap hurdle, was pulled up in the Liverpool Hurdle and finished ninth of 24 runners in a handicap hurdle at Punchestown. On 10 July 2026, he finished third in a race over hurdles at Cork. After the race, trainer Shark Hanlon, announced the eleven-year-old's retirement.
