= Denis O'Regan (jockey) =

Irish jockey

- Occupation: Jockey
- Born: March 1982; Youghal, County Cork, Ireland

Denis O'Regan is a retired Irish jockey who competed in National Hunt racing and won seven Grade 1 races. In November 2023 he became the first jockey to ride a winner at every active National Hunt racecourse in Britain and Ireland. He retired after riding at Navan on 18 November 2023.

== Background ==
The son of a cattle farmer and a publican, O'Regan was born in March 1982 in Youghal, County Cork, and gained experience in pony racing and drag hunting before becoming a jockey.

== Career as a jockey ==
O'Regan gained his first winner on All Honey for trainer Francis Flood in a bumper at Listowel when he was riding as an amateur jockey in April 2001. His rode his first winner as a professional on Rupununi for Frank Ennis in a maiden hurdle at Listowel in September 2003, soon after he had taken out a licence. His first major win was on Ansar, trained by Dermot Weld, in the Galway Plate in 2005.

O'Regan gained his first Grade 1 win on Offshore Account, trained by Charlie Swan, in the 2007 Hanover Quay Champion Novice Chase at Punchestown. At the start of the 2007/08 season he moved to England to take up a position as stable jockey to County Durham trainer Howard Johnson. At the 2008 Cheltenham Festival he rode two Grade 1 winners for Johnson, Tidal Bay in the Arkle Challenge Trophy and Inglis Drever in the Stayers' Hurdle. In April 2008 he had his second ride in the Grand National, finishing fifth on Bewley's Berry, trained by Johnson.

In November 2008 O'Regan rode Black Appalachi to victory over Grand National fences in the Becher Chase at Aintree for Dessie Hughes. The partnership came second in the 2010 Grand National, beaten five lengths by Tony McCoy on Don't Push It. After the race O'Regan said: "He was a bit keen early on but once he settled into a lovely rhythm he was fantastic. It's a pleasure to ride a horse like him round here." At the same meeting he rode Tidal Bay to victory in the Grade 1 Maghull Novices' Chase. O'Regan's contract with Johnson was not renewed at the end of the 2009/10 season, after he had missed rides through injury, weight problems and whip bans.

After splitting from Johnson, O'Regan rode as a freelance until 2016. At the 2012 Cheltenham Festival he rode Cape Tribulation, trained by Malcolm Jefferson, to victory in the Pertemps Final Handicap Hurdle. A month later the pair won the Grade 3 Silver Cross Handicap Hurdle at the Aintree meeting and then went on to another win at the 2013 Cheltenham Festival, when they took the Grade 2 Cotswold Chase. O'Regan achieved two Grade 1 successes in the 2012/13 season on Countrywide Flame in the Fighting Fifth Hurdle at Newcastle for John Quinn and Ruacana in the Finale Juvenile Hurdle at Chepstow for John Ferguson. In 2016 he returned to Ireland to ride for owner Barry Connell. The pair achieved success with Tully East, trained by Alan Fleming, in the Close Brothers Novice Handicap Chase at the 2017 Cheltenham Festival. The association with Connell came to an end in 2018 and O'Regan returned to freelance riding. His final Grade 1 win came on Beacon Edge, trained by Noel Meade, in the 2021 Drinmore Novice Chase at Fairyhouse.

With a win at Hereford on 6 November 2023, O'Regan became the first jockey to ride a winner at every active National Hunt racecourse in Britain and Ireland. He retired after riding at Navan on 18 November 2023.

== Personal life ==
O'Regan lives in Ireland with his wife Louise and two sons.

== Major wins ==
(Republic of Ireland) Ireland

- Hanover Quay Champion Novice Chase - (1) - Offshore Account (2007)
- Drinmore Novice Chase - (1) - Beacon Edge (2021)

(United Kingdom) Great Britain

- Arkle Challenge Trophy - (1) - Tidal Bay (2008)
- Stayers' Hurdle - (1) - Inglis Drever (2008)
- Maghull Novices' Chase - (1) - Tidal Bay (2008)
- Fighting Fifth Hurdle - (1) - Countrywide Flame (2012)
- Finale Juvenile Hurdle - (1) - Ruacana (2012)
