= Oaksey Chase =

Steeplechase horse race in Britain

Oaksey Chase
2026
Doyen Quest	Blow Your Wad	Teddy Blue

Previous years
2025
Gaelic Warrior	Appreciate It	Ga Law
2024
Fantastic Lady	Ga Law	Hitman
2023
Hewick	First Flow	Fantastic Lady
2022
Saint Calvados	Mister Fisher	Erne River
2021
Frodon	Mister Fisher	Born Survivor

2020-2014
2019
Black Corton	Gold Present	San Benedeto
2018
Top Notch	Art Mauresque	O O Seven
2017
Menorah	Traffic Fluide	Josses Hill
2016
Menorah	Valseur Lido	Rocky Creek
2015
Menorah	Al Ferof	Third Intention
2014
Menorah	Gullinbursti	Hunt Ball

The Oaksey Chase is a Grade 2 National Hunt chase in Great Britain which is open to horses aged five years or older. It is run at Sandown Park over a distance of about 2 miles and 6½ furlongs (2 miles, 6 furlongs and 164 yards, or 4,576 metres), and it is scheduled to take place each year in April.

The race was first run in 2014 as a Listed race, and was raised to Grade 2 status in 2016. The title commemorates John Oaksey (1929 - 2012), an amateur jockey and journalist who rode the winner of the 1958 Whitbread Gold Cup at Sandown Park.

== Records ==
Most successful horse (4 wins):

- Menorah – 2014, 2015, 2016, 2017

Leading jockey (4 wins):

- Richard Johnson – Menorah (2014, 2015, 2016, 2017)

Leading trainer (4 wins):

- Philip Hobbs – Menorah (2014, 2015, 2016, 2017)

== Winners ==
Year	Winner	Age	Jockey	Trainer
2014	Menorah	9	Richard Johnson	Philip Hobbs
2015	Menorah	10	Richard Johnson	Philip Hobbs
2016	Menorah	11	Richard Johnson	Philip Hobbs
2017	Menorah	12	Richard Johnson	Philip Hobbs
2018	Top Notch	7	Daryl Jacob	Nicky Henderson
2019	Black Corton	8	Bryony Frost	Paul Nicholls
	no race 2020 (Note: The 2020 running was cancelled because of the COVID-19 pandemic in the United Kingdom)
2021	Frodon	9	Bryony Frost	Paul Nicholls
2022	Saint Calvados	9	Harry Cobden	Paul Nicholls
2023	Hewick	8	Rachael Blackmore	Shark Hanlon
2024	Fantastic Lady	9	Nico de Boinville	Nicky Henderson
2025	Gaelic Warrior	7	Paul Townend	Willie Mullins
2026	Doyen Quest	8	Harry Skelton	Dan Skelton

== See also ==
- Horse racing in Great Britain
- List of British National Hunt races
