= Don't Push It =

Irish-bred Thoroughbred racehorse

- Sire: Old Vic
- Grandsire: Sadlers Wells
- Dam: She's no Laugh Ben
- Damsire: Alleged
- Sex: Gelding
- Foaled: 6 June 2000
- Country: Ireland
- Colour: Bay
- Breeder: Dominick Vallely
- Owner: J. P. McManus
- Trainer: Jonjo O'Neill
- Record: 29: 8-4-3
- Earnings: £754,616

Major wins
- Grand National (2010)

Don't Push It (foaled 6 June 2000) is a retired British thoroughbred racehorse who won the Grand National in 2010. He was trained by Jonjo O'Neill at Jackdaws Castle yard near Cheltenham and ran in the green and yellow silks of owner J. P. McManus. He was ridden in most of his races, including the Grand National, by Tony McCoy.

== Racing career ==
Don't Push It began his career on 5 December 2004 at Warwick in a National Hunt flat race, finishing third. He did not appear on the racecourse again until 24 September 2005, when he won a National Hunt flat race at Market Rasen. Shortly before Christmas, he had his first start over hurdles, winning at Haydock. He did not race again that season.

In October 2006 Don't Push It raced over fences for the first time, winning a race at Stratford. He was beaten next time out at Cheltenham in a novices chase by Denman. A month later, Don't Push It returned to the course to record another victory over fences. His next run was in February at Chepstow, where he won by 23 lengths. He then headed for the 2007 Cheltenham Festival, where he contested the Grade 1 Arkle Challenge Trophy novices' chase. He fell at the second last fence when going well in third position. His final race of the season was the Grade 1 Maghull Novices' Chase at Aintree, where he finished fifth of six runners, 26 lengths behind the winner.

Don't Push It began the 2007/08 season by winning the Silver Trophy Handicap Hurdle at Chepstow in October, ridden by Noel Fehily. He then had a break until the Cheltenham Festival, where, ridden by his regular jockey McCoy, he fell two out when not in contention in the Plate Handicap Chase. His third and final race of the season was the John Smith's Extra Cold Handicap Hurdle at Aintree in April 2008. Racing over 3 miles for the first time, he came in 17th of 19 finishers, 70 lengths behind the winner.

In November 2008, Don't Push It was pulled up in the Paddy Power Gold Cup at Cheltenham. He then ran in three handicap hurdle races, with two second places, before coming seventh in the Pertemps Final handicap hurdle race at the 2009 Cheltenham Festival. In April 2009, he returned to running over fences, winning the 3 mile 1 furlong John Smith's Handicap Chase at Aintree.

Don't Push It had his first outing of the 2009/10 season at Aintree, coming fourth behind Monet's Garden in the Old Roan Chase. This was followed by second and third places in chases, before he was pulled up in the Pertemps Final handicap hurdle race at the 2010 Cheltenham Festival. His fifth and final race of the season was the 2010 Grand National at Aintree on 10 April 2010. He started as 10-1 joint favourite with Big Fella Thanks. Having raced in mid-division in the first half of the race, he tracked the leaders from the 17th fence, went into second position two out and took the lead over the last, staying on in the run-in to beat Black Apalachi by five lengths. It was McCoy's with first Grand National win at his fifteenth attempt, and also a first win in the race for trainer O'Neill and owner McManus.

The following season Don't Push It had four starts in handicap hurdles without success, before returning to Aintree for the 2011 Grand National. Carrying top weight, he started joint second favourite at 9/1. He raced in mid-division and stayed on to finish third, fourteen and a quarter lengths behind winner Ballabriggs. In the final race of his career, Don't Push It came sixth of 19 runners in a handicap hurdle at Cheltenham in November 2011.

== Retirement ==
Don't Push It's retirement was announced on 10 January 2012. O'Neill explained that the twelve-year-old "had not really been sparkling and the last thing we wanted was to make him carry on doing something he was not really happy with." He settled into retirement at his owner's Martinstown Stud in Ireland, where he is turned out to grass with Cheltenham Festival winner Master Tern.
