= Bridle Road Handicap Hurdle =

Hurdle horse race in Britain

- Class: Premier Handicap
- Location: Aintree Racecourse; Merseyside, England
- Race type: Hurdle race
- Website: Aintree

Race information
- Distance: 3m 149y (4,964 metres)
- Surface: Turf
- Track: Left-handed
- Qualification: Four-years-old and up
- Weight: Handicap
- Purse: £75,000 (2022); 1st: £42,203

Bridle Road Handicap Hurdle
2026
Wade Out	Eagle Fang	Chart Topper

Previous years
2025
Deep Cave	Timmy Tuesday	Double Powerful
2024
Gwennie May Boy	Lord Snootie	West Balboa
2023
West Balboa	Pounding Poet	Mill Green
2022
Party Business	Ilikedwayurthinkin	Mill Green
2021
Hometown Boy	J'Ai Froid	Tea Clipper

2020-2011
2019
Aux Ptits Soins	Tommy Rapper	Keeper Hill
2018
Mr Big Shot	Now Mcginty	Ah Littleluck
2017
Fountains Windfall	No Comment	Dadsintrouble
2016
Ubak	If in Doubt	Silsol
2015
Taglietelle	Call The Cops	Master Malt
2014
Doctor Harper	Kaylif Aramis	Meister Eckhart
2013
Battle Group	Jetson	First Fandango
2012
Cape Tribulation	American Spin	Trustan Times
2011
Battle Group	Ringaroses	Sir Harry Ormesher

2010-2001
2010
Ringaroses	Carsonstown Boy	Bob 'n' You
2009
Time For Rupert	Inchidaly Rock	Kawagino
2008
Forest Pennant	Superior Wisdom	According To Pete
2007
Albertas Run	Lyes Green	Refinement
2006
Refinement	Material World	Mughas
2005
Holland Park	Celtic Son	The Dark Lord
2004
His Nibs	Keepatem	Strong Project
2003
Carlovent	Rostropovich	Keepatem
2002
Sudden Shock	Iris Royal	Freetown
2001
Carlovent	Springfield Scally	Forest Ivory

2000-1991
2000
Ross Moff	Frantic Tan	Daraydan
1999
Papo Kharisma	Darapour	Nocksky
1998
The Proms	Spendid	Haile Derring
1997
Escartefigue	Big Strand	Freddie Muck
1996
Top Spin	Jathib	Uncle Keeny
1995
What A Question	Major Bell	So Proud
1994
Meditator	Linkside	Sayfar's Lad
1993
Andrew's First	Metal Oiseau	Pashto
1992
Threeoutoffour	Castle Secret	Everaldo
1991
Merano	Ru Valentino	Leading Role

1990-1988
1990
Sip Of Orange	Trapper John	Parsons Green
1989
Slalom	Old Malton	Sooner Still
1988
Rapier Thrust	Carnival Air	Agathist

The Bridle Road Handicap Hurdle is a Premier Handicap National Hunt hurdle race in Great Britain which is open to horses aged four years or older. It is run at Aintree over a distance of about 3 miles and ½ furlong (3 miles and 149 yards, or 4,964 metres), and during its running there are thirteen hurdles to be jumped. It is a handicap race, and it is scheduled to take place each year in early April at the Grand National meeting.

The race was promoted from Listed to Grade 3 status in 2010. In 2014 the race was run as the Dominican Republic Handicap Hurdle and in 2015 it carried the name of the Injured Jockeys Fund. Since 2016 it has been run under various sponsored titles.

The race was first run in 1985 as the Oddbins Handicap Hurdle, but this name was switched to the 2 miles 4 furlong race (now known as the Merseyrail Handicap Hurdle) in 1992.

== Winners ==
- Weights given in stones and pounds.

Year	Winner	Age	Weight	Jockey	Trainer
1985	Gembridge Jupiter	7	10-03	John Suthern	C Trietline
1986	Ishkomann	7	10-09	Graham McCourt	John Spearing
1987	Mandavi	6	10-04	Michael Bowlby	Nicky Henderson
1988	Rapier Thrust	6	11-03	Mark Dwyer	Jimmy FitzGerald
1989	Slalom	8	12-00	John White	Michael Robinson
1990	Sip of Orange	8	10-03	Mark Dwyer	Jimmy FitzGerald
1991	Merano	9	10-04	Graham McCourt	Mick Easterby
1992	Threeoutoffour	7	10-00	Martin Brennan	Owen Brennan
1993	Andrew's First	6	10-02	Carl Llewellyn	M J Wilkinson
1994	Meditator	10	10-10	Sean Curran	Jacqui Doyle
1995	What A Question	7	10-00	Norman Williamson	Mouse Morris
1996	Top Spin	7	10–11	Tony McCoy	John Jenkins
1997	Escartefigue	5	11-10	Richard Dunwoody	David Nicholson
1998	The Proms	7	11-07	Carl Llewellyn	Nigel Twiston-Davies
1999	Papo Kharisma	9	10-00	Adrian Maguire	Philip Hobbs
2000	Ross Moff	7	10-10	Paul Carberry	Tony Martin
2001	Carlovent	6	10-01	Tom Scudamore	Martin Pipe
2002	Sudden Shock	7	10-01	J R Kavanagh	Jonjo O'Neill
2003	Carlovent	8	10–11	Tony McCoy	Martin Pipe
2004	His Nibs	7	10-10	Joe Tizzard	Venetia Williams
2005	Holland Park	8	11-00	Joe Tizzard	Sarah Williams
2006	Refinement	7	10–12	Tony McCoy	Jonjo O'Neill
2007	Albertas Run	6	10-04	Noel Fehily	Jonjo O'Neill
2008	Forest Pennant	6	10–13	Ruby Walsh	Paul Nicholls
2009	Time For Rupert	5	10-10	Will Kennedy	Paul Webber
2010	Ringaroses	9	11-00	Tony McCoy	Jonjo O'Neill
2011	Battle Group	6	11-01	Barry Geraghty	David Pipe
2012	Cape Tribulation	8	11–12	Denis O'Regan	Malcolm Jefferson
2013	Battle Group	8	10–12	Brendan Powell jnr	Kevin Bishop
2014	Doctor Harper	6	11-03	Tom Scudamore	David Pipe
2015	Taglietelle	6	11-06	Paul Carberry	Gordon Elliott
2016	Ubak	8	11-00	Josh Moore	Gary Moore
2017	Fountains Windfall	7	10–12	David Noonan	Anthony Honeyball
2018	Mr Big Shot	7	11-05	Tom Scudamore	David Pipe
2019	Aux Ptits Soins	9	11-08	Harry Skelton	Dan Skelton
	no race 2020 (Note: The 2020 running was cancelled because of the COVID-19 pandemic in the United Kingdom)
2021	Hometown Boy	6	11-00	Ciaran Gethings	Stuart Edmunds
2022	Party Business	6	10-07	Charlie Todd	Ian Williams
2023	West Balboa	7	11-02	Harry Skelton	Dan Skelton
2024	Gwennie May Boy	6	10-08	Charlie Todd	Dan Skelton
2025	Deep Cave	7	11-02	Jack Tudor	Christian Williams
2026	Wade Out	7	11-02	Gavin Sheehan	Olly Murphy

== See also ==
- Horse racing in Great Britain
- List of British National Hunt races
