= Galway Plate =

Steeplechase horse race in Ireland

- Class: Grade A
- Location: Galway Races, Galway, Ireland
- Inaugurated: 1869
- Race type: Steeplechase
- Sponsor: Tote Ireland
- Website: Galway Races

Race information
- Distance: 2 miles 6 and a half furlongs (4,778 metres)
- Surface: Turf
- Qualification: Four-years-old and up
- Weight: Handicap
- Purse: €300,000 (2019); 1st: €177,000

Galway Plate
2026
King Alexander	Conyers Hill	Gorgeous Tom

Previous years
2025
Western Fold	Jesse Evans	Shecouldbeanything
2024
Pinkerton	Duffle Coat	Zanahiyr
2023
Ash Tree Meadow	Authorized Art	Hollow Games
2022
Hewick	Darasso	El Barra
2021
Royal Rendezvous	Easy Game	Modus

2020-2011
2020
Early Doors	Royal Rendezvous	Cabaret Queen
2019
Borice	Black Corton	Snugsborough Benny
2018
Clarcam	Patricks Park	Jury Duty
2017
Balko Des Flos	Shaneshill	Slowmotion
2016
Lord Scoundrel	Alelchi Inois	Ballycasey
2015
Shanahan's Turn	The Paparrazi Kid	Sadler's Risk
2014
Road To Riches	Burn And Turn	Balnaslow
2013
Carlingford Lough	Quantitativeeasing	Jacksonslady
2012
Bob Lingo	Casey Top	Blackstairmountain
2011
Blazing Tempo	Wise Old Owl	Aigle D'or

2010-2001
2010
Finger Onthe Pulse	Themoonandsixpence	Majestic Concorde
2009
Ballyholland	Knock On The Head	Washington Lad
2008
Oslot	Oodachee	Ansar
2007
Sir Frederick	Ballyagran	Cool Running
2006
Far From Trouble	Ansar	Dix Villez
2005
Ansar	Ursumman	Light On The Broom
2004
Ansar	Risk Accessor	Manjoe
2003
Nearly A Moose	Kadoun	Glynn Dingle
2002
Rockholm Boy	Wotsitooya	Ridgewood Water
2001
Grimes	Quinze	Dovaly

2000-1992
2000
Dovaly	Monty's Pass	Palette
1999
Moscow Express	Lucky Town	Nicholls Cross
1998
Amlah	Lucky Town	Corket
1997
Stroll Home	Idiots Venture	Derrymoyle
1996
Life Of A Lord	Bishops Hall	King Wah Glory
1995
Life Of A Lord	Kelly's Pearl	Loshian
1994
Feathered Gale	Minister For Fun	Mubadir
1993
General Idea	Harristown Lady	Galevilla Express
1992
The Gooser	Baptismal Fire	Four Trix

The Galway Plate is a National Hunt chase in Ireland which is open to horses aged four years or older. It is run at Galway over a distance of about 2 miles and 6 1/2 furlongs (2 miles 6 furlongs and 111 yards, or 4,779 metres), and during its running there are fourteen fences to be jumped. It is a handicap race, and it is scheduled to take place each year in late July or early August.

The event is held during the seven-day Galway Festival meeting. It was established in 1869, and the inaugural running was won by Absentee. The most successful horse in the race's history is Tipperary Boy, who won three times – in 1899, 1901 and 1902. It was formerly contested over 2 miles and 5 furlongs, but this was extended to 2 miles and 6 furlongs in 1992 and extended by a further half a furlong to the present distance in 2015. The Galway Plate was sponsored by William Hill from 2006 to 2010 and by Tote Ireland since 2011.

Anne Collen was the first lady trainer winning the plate with Randoss in the 1987 Galway Plate National Hunt Chase. Her sister, Sarah Collen, was also the first lady jockey to win the Galway Plate aboard Bold Flyer in 1989.

== Records ==
Most successful horse since 1988 (2 wins):

- Life of a Lord – 1995, 1996
- Ansar – 2004, 2005

Leading jockey since 1988 (2 wins):

- Adrian Maguire – The Gooser (1992), General Idea (1993)
- Ruby Walsh – Moscow Express (1999), Oslot (2008)
- Mark Walsh – Bob Lingo (2012), Early Doors (2020)
- Paul Townend - Blazing Tempo (2011), Royal Rendevzous (2021)
- Danny Gilligan - Ash Tree Meadow (2023), Western Fold (2025)

Leading trainer since 1988 (5 wins):

- Gordon Elliott - Lord Scoundrel (2016), Clarcam (2018), Borice (2019), Ash Tree Meadow (2023), Western Fold (2025)

== Winners since 1988 ==
- Weights given in stones and pounds.

Year	Winner	Age	Weight	Jockey	Trainer
1988	Afford a King	8	09-10	Padge Gill	Tony Mullins
1989	Bold Flyer	6	09-07	Sarah Collen	Jim Dreaper
1990	Kiichi	5	11-03	Brendan Sheridan	Dermot Weld
1991	Firions Law	6	10-08	Mickey Flynn	Victor Bowens
1992	The Gooser	9	10-11	Adrian Maguire	Paddy Mullins
1993	General Idea	8	12-00	Adrian Maguire	Dermot Weld
1994	Feathered Gale	7	09-11	Francis Woods	Arthur Moore
1995	Life of a Lord	9	11-08	Trevor Horgan	Aidan O'Brien
1996	Life of a Lord	10	12-00	Charlie Swan	Aidan O'Brien
1997	Stroll Home	7	09-12	Paul Carberry	Jimmy Mangan
1998	Amlah	6	09-13	Brendan Powell	Philip Hobbs
1999	Moscow Express	7	11-04	Ruby Walsh	Frances Crowley
2000	Dovaly	7	09-13	Tom Rudd	Michael O'Brien
2001	Grimes	8	10-01	Conor O'Dwyer	Christy Roche
2002	Rockholm Boy	9	10-05	Keith Hadnett	Michael Hourigan
2003	Nearly a Moose	7	10-01	Robbie Power	Paddy Mullins
2004	Ansar	8	10-12	David Casey	Dermot Weld
2005	Ansar	9	11-11	Denis O'Regan	Dermot Weld
2006	Far From Trouble	7	10-04	Roger Loughran	Christy Roche
2007	Sir Frederick	7	09-10	Kevin Coleman	Liam Burke
2008	Oslot	6	10-13	Ruby Walsh	Paul Nicholls
2009	Ballyholland	8	10-09	Andrew McNamara	Colin McBratney
2010	Finger Onthe Pulse	9	10-12	Tony McCoy	Tom Taaffe
2011	Blazing Tempo	7	10-04	Paul Townend	Willie Mullins
2012	Bob Lingo	10	10-03	Mark Walsh	Thomas Mullins
2013	Carlingford Lough	7	10-07	Tony McCoy	John Kiely
2014	Road To Riches	7	10-11	Shane Shortall	Noel Meade
2015	Shanahan's Turn	7	10-10	Johnny Burke	Henry de Bromhead
2016	Lord Scoundrel	7	10-02	Donagh Meyler	Gordon Elliott
2017	Balko Des Flos	6	10-10	Davy Russell	Henry de Bromhead
2018	Clarcam	8	10-13	Mark Enright	Gordon Elliott
2019	Borice	8	10-02	Luke Dempsey	Gordon Elliott
2020	Early Doors	7	10-05	Mark Walsh	Joseph O'Brien
2021	Royal Rendezvous	9	11-05	Paul Townend	Willie Mullins
2022	Hewick	7	11-07	Jordan Gainford	John Hanlon
2023	Ash Tree Meadow	7	09-11	Danny Gilligan	Gordon Elliott
2024	Pinkerton	8	10-04	Donagh Meyler	Noel Meade
2025	Western Fold	6	11-10	Danny Gilligan	Gordon Elliott
2026	King Alexander	8	10-13	Daniel King	Willie Mullins

== Earlier winners ==
- 1869 - Absentee
- 1872 - Belle
- 1879 - Liberator
- 1882 - Sugar Plum
- 1891 - Queen of the May
- 1897 - Drogheda
- 1899 - Tipperary Boy
- 1901 - Tipperary Boy
- 1902 - Tipperary Boy
- 1905 - Goldfield
- 1906 - Royal Tara
- 1910 - Ashbrooke
- 1913 - George B
- 1915 - Hill of Camas
- 1917 - Privit
- 1934 - Reviewer
- 1937 - Brighter Cottage
- 1945 - Grecian Victory
- 1950 - Derrinstown
- 1951 - St Kathleen II
- 1952 - Alberoni
- 1953 - Gallant Wolf
- 1954 - Amber Point
- 1955 - Umm
- 1956 - Amber Point
- 1957 - Knight Errant
- 1958 - Hopeful Colleen
- 1959 - Highfield Lad
- 1960 - Sparkling Flame
- 1961 - Clipador
- 1962 - Carraroe
- 1963 - Blunts Cross
- 1964 - Ross Sea
- 1965 - Ross Sea
- 1966 - Cappawhite
- 1967 - Royal Day
- 1968 - Terossian
- 1969 - Royal Day
- 1970 - Lisnaree
- 1971 - Sarejay Day
- 1972 - Persian Lark
- 1973 - Leap Frog
- 1974 - Bunclody Tiger
- 1975 - Our Albert
- 1976 - O'Leary
- 1977 - Spittin' Image
- 1978 - Shining Flame
- 1979 - Hindhope
- 1980 - Sir Barry
- 1981 - Rugged Lucy
- 1982 - The Lady's Master
- 1983 - Hamers Flame
- 1984 - Master Player
- 1985 - Chow Mein
- 1986 - Boro Quarter
- 1987 - Randoss

== See also ==
- Horse racing in Ireland
- List of Irish National Hunt races
