= Ballabriggs =

Irish-bred Thoroughbred racehorse (2001–2026)

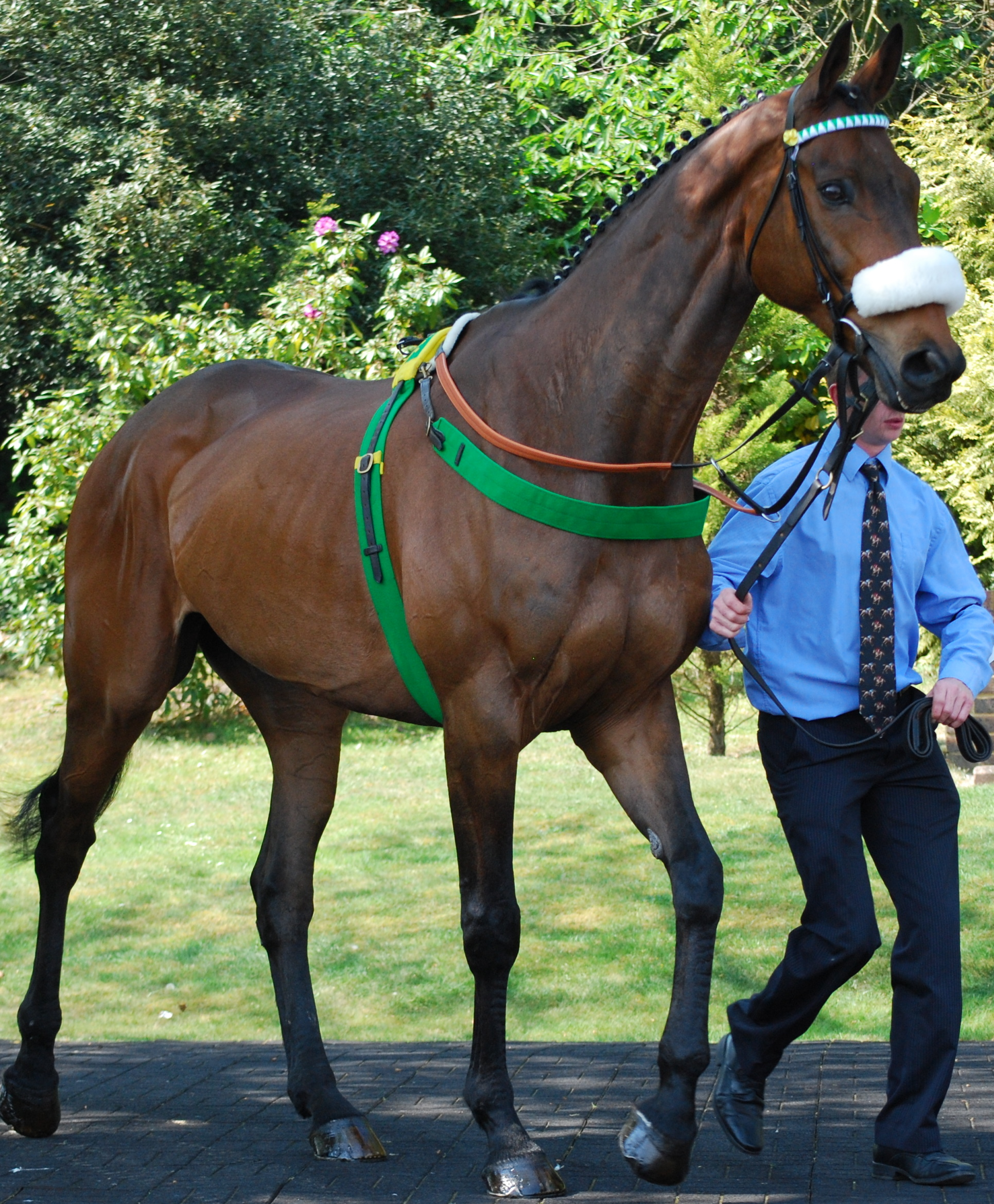
- Ballabriggs in 2011
- Sire: Presenting
- Grandsire: Mtoto
- Dam: Papoose
- Damsire: Little Bighorn
- Sex: Gelding
- Foaled: 20 April 2001
- Died: 9 November 2026 (aged 25)
- Country: Ireland
- Colour: Bay
- Breeder: Mrs S L Jackson
- Owner: Trevor Hemmings
- Trainer: Donald McCain, Jr.
- Record: 28: 7-7-2
- Earnings: £623,049

Major wins
- Fulke Walwyn Kim Muir Challenge Cup (2010); Grand National (2011)
- Last updated on 13 April 2013

Ballabriggs (20 April 2001 – 9 November 2026) was a Grand National-winning National Hunt racehorse trained by Donald McCain, Jr. in Cholmondeley, Cheshire and owned by Trevor Hemmings.

== Racing career ==
Ballabriggs' racecourse debut was in a 2-mile National Hunt flat race at Uttoxeter on 14 May 2006. He was ridden by Stephen Craine and finished 5th of 15, beaten 23 lengths, at odds of 13/2. For the next two seasons he campaigned unsuccessfully over hurdles, before switching to chasing in December 2007. At Catterick on 18 January 2008, he was ridden for the first time by Jason Maguire who would go on to be the jockey with which he is most closely associated. At the sixth time of asking, and having finished runner up three times, he finally got off the mark as a chaser, winning a Class 4 Beginners' Chase at Bangor.

In 2010, the gelding came to the fore as a chaser, winning five races in succession, including the Fulke Walwyn Kim Muir Challenge Cup at the Cheltenham Festival at odds of 9/1.

Then in 2011, Ballabriggs had his greatest moment, winning the 2011 Grand National at Aintree Racecourse. Ridden by Maguire, the horse's odds were between 14-1 and 20-1 before the race, but he unexpectedly remained in the leading pack for most of the race, before pulling out in front over the final fences. Ballabriggs finished ahead of Sam Waley-Cohen's Oscar Time in second, and Tony McCoy's Don't Push It in third. Dehydrated in the unusually hot weather, Ballabriggs immediately returned to the stable after the win, instead of going to the winners enclosure as tradition dictates. It was the first time only the jockey entered the winner's enclosure without his mount.

Following his Grand National win Maguire received a five-day ban for excessive use of the whip in the closing stages, Ballabriggs having been driven so hard he required oxygen after the race.

The horse never won again following his National success, although he contested two more Grand Nationals, finishing 6th in 2012, and pulling up in 2013, the final race of his career.

== Retirement and death ==
Ballabriggs was retired on 13 April 2013 after pulling up in the 2013 Grand National and returned to live on the Isle of Man with owner Trevor Hemmings. He had run 28 races, winning 7.

Ballabriggs died on 9 November 2026, at the age of 25.

== Pedigree ==
Pedigree of Ballabriggs (IRE), bay gelding, 27 April 2001
Sire Presenting 1992	Mtoto b.1983	Busted	Crepello
Sire Presenting 1992	Mtoto b.1983	Busted	Donatello
Sire Presenting 1992	Mtoto b.1983	Amazer (FR)	Mincio
Sire Presenting 1992	Mtoto b.1983	Amazer (FR)	Alzara
Sire Presenting 1992	D'Azy 1984	Persian Bold	Bold Lad (IRE)
Sire Presenting 1992	D'Azy 1984	Persian Bold	Relkarunner
Sire Presenting 1992	D'Azy 1984	Belle Viking	Riverman (USA)
Sire Presenting 1992	D'Azy 1984	Belle Viking	Vallarta
Dam Papoose (IRE) 1993	Little Bighorn 1985	Blakeney	Hethersett
Dam Papoose (IRE) 1993	Little Bighorn 1985	Blakeney	Windmill Girl
Dam Papoose (IRE) 1993	Little Bighorn 1985	Nip In The Air (USA)	Northern Dancer
Dam Papoose (IRE) 1993	Little Bighorn 1985	Nip In The Air (USA)	China Trade
Dam Papoose (IRE) 1993	Thomastown Girl	Tekoah	Great White Way
Dam Papoose (IRE) 1993	Thomastown Girl	Tekoah	Tatelka
Dam Papoose (IRE) 1993	Thomastown Girl	Wrong Decision	No Argument
Dam Papoose (IRE) 1993	Thomastown Girl	Wrong Decision	Tourina (Family 3-n)
