= Trevor Hemmings =

British billionaire businessman (1935–2021)

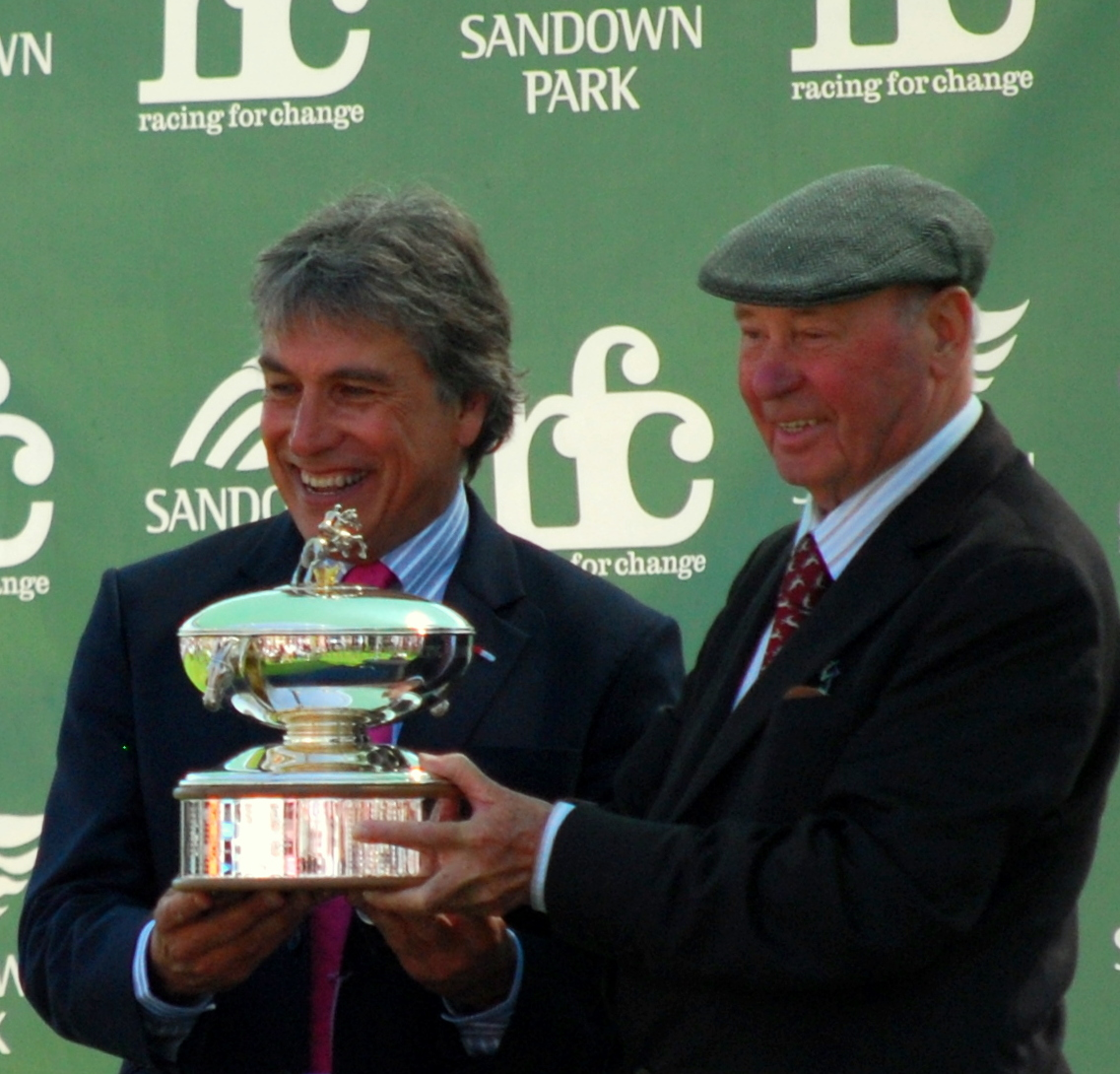
- Hemmings (right) with John Inverdale at the National Hunt racing awards, Sandown 2011
- Born: Trevor James Hemmings; 11 June 1935; Woolwich, London, England
- Died: 11 October 2021 (aged 86); Ballasyer Stud, Andreas, Isle of Man
- Occupation: Businessman
- Spouse: Eve Rumney (m. 1955)
- Children: 4

Trevor James Hemmings CVO (11 June 1935 – 11 October 2021) was a British billionaire businessman.

== Early life ==
Hemmings was born in Woolwich, London, on 11 June 1935, the son of a Royal Ordnance worker. During the Second World War, part of the Royal Ordnance was relocated to Euxton, Lancashire, and the family moved there when he was aged five.

Hemmings began work on the railways while studying business studies at night school. He then became an apprentice bricklayer and made his initial fortune through housebuilding businesses, the first of which he sold in the early 1970s and the second of which was bought by Barratt Developments for £5.7million.

== Career ==
Hemmings owned Preston North End F.C., Northern Trust Co. Ltd, Classic Lodges Ltd. and Trust Inns Ltd. He also owned over 100 racehorses, three of which won the Grand National: Hedgehunter (2005), Ballabriggs (2011), and Many Clouds (2015).

In 2009, it was reported by the Sunday Times Rich List that Hemmings had lost £700m because of a collapse in the price of Royal Bank of Scotland shares, making him only the ninth richest man in the North West and the 178th in the country. The Rich List editor, Ian Coxon, said the drop in Hemmings' fortunes had been caused by the decrease in value of his North West property portfolio as well as his share investment.

According to the Sunday Times Rich List in 2021, Hemmings was worth £1.115 billion.

Hemmings also purchased the site of the former Pontins holiday camp at Plemont Bay in Jersey in 2005. He submitted several plans to redevelop the site for housing, but there followed a long campaign against the development led by the National Trust for Jersey. Ultimately in 2014 the NTJ purchased the site from Hemmings for £7.15m, with £3.6m provided by the States of Jersey.

== Philanthropy ==
Hemmings provided the funds for the S.A.F.E centre, a project helping the victims of sexual violence in Preston, Lancashire.

== Recognition ==
Hemmings was appointed Commander of the Royal Victorian Order (CVO) in the 2011 Birthday Honours for his service with The Princess Royal Trust for Carers, now renamed Carers Trust.

== Personal life ==
Hemmings married Eve Rumney in 1955, they had three sons and one daughter.

In later life, he primarily resided at the Ballasyer Stud, Andreas, Isle of Man. He died on 11 October 2021, at the age of 86.

== See also ==
- Sportech
