= Jason Maguire =

Irish jockey

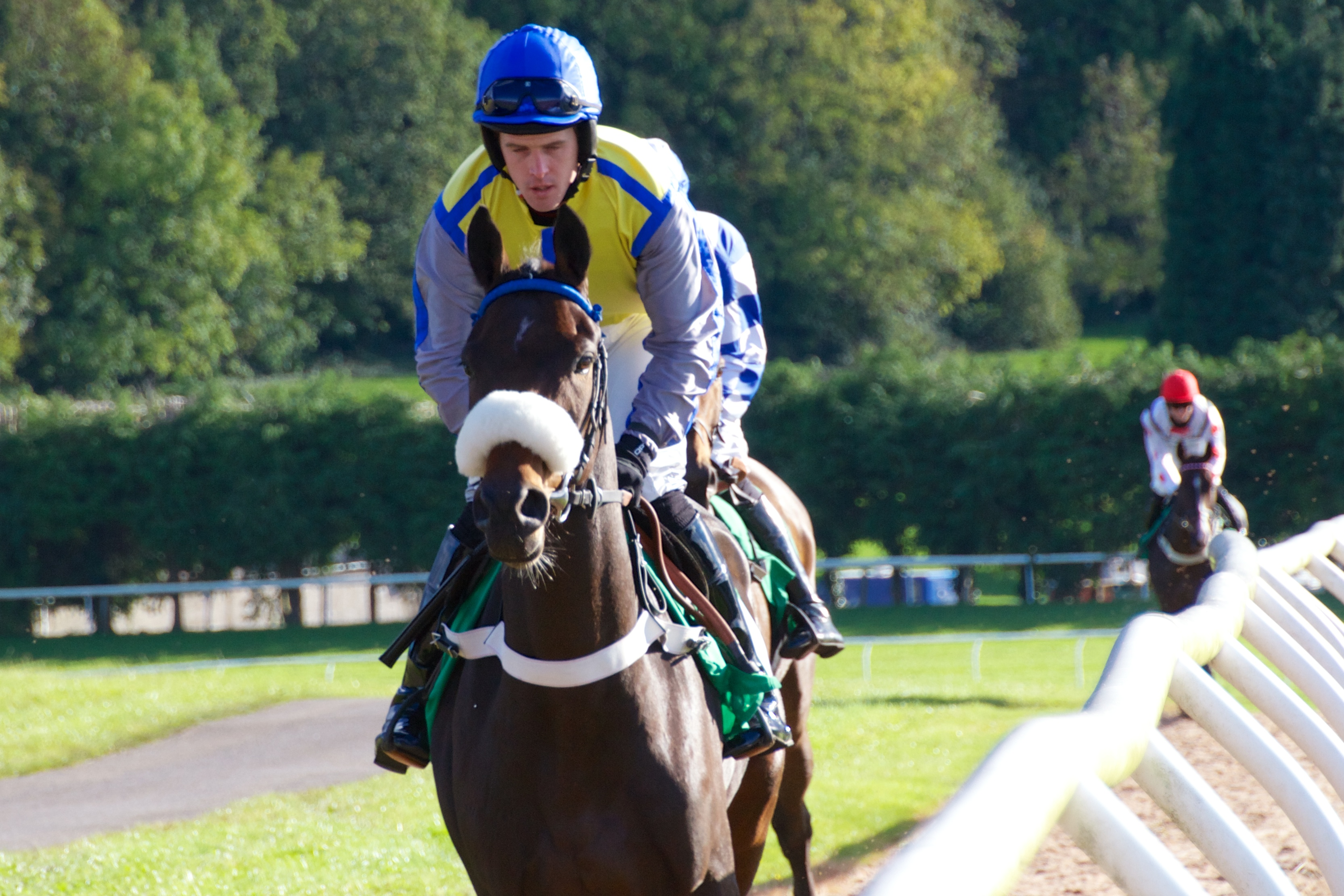
- Maguire riding Ubaltique in 2012

Personal information
- Born: 13 April 1980 (age 46) County Meath, Ireland
- Occupation: Jockey

Horse racing career
- Sport: Horse racing

Major racing wins
- Grand National (2011)
- Updated on 15 April 2011

Jason Maguire (born 13 April 1980) is a former horse racing jockey.

== Early life and career ==
Maguire is the nephew of another former jockey Adrian Maguire. He won the 2011 Grand National on 14/1 shot Ballabriggs. Following his Grand National win, Maguire received a five-day ban for excessive use of the whip, Ballabriggs having been driven so hard he required oxygen after the race.

== Retirement ==
On 5 May 2016 Maguire announced his retirement. His last ride was a fall in 2015.
