= Adrian Maguire =

Irish racehorse trainer and jockey

Adrian Maguire (born 29 April 1971 in Kilmessan, County Meath, Ireland), is a racehorse trainer and former jockey.

Maguire began his career in Irish pony racing at the age of nine, in which he rode more than 200 winners. In 1990 he rode his first winner under rules, at Sligo, before his first victory in the United Kingdom a year later. In the 1993–1994 season he rode 194 winners but lost the jockeys' championship by a margin of three to Richard Dunwoody. Maguire won a total of 1,024 races in the UK and has been described as "the greatest jump jockey never to end up as [British jump racing Champion Jockey]".

He announced his retirement from race riding on 28 October 2002, at the age of 31, following a fall at Warwick in March in which he broke his neck and was lucky to avoid paralysis. Maguire later became a racehorse trainer and is based in Lombardstown, County Cork.

Maguire's nephew, Jason Maguire, is also a National Hunt jockey and won the 2011 Grand National on Ballabriggs.
