= 1961 Grand National =

English steeplechase horse race

- Grand National
- Location: Aintree Racecourse
- Date: 25 March 1961
- Winning horse: (Republic of Ireland) Nicolaus Silver
- Starting price: 28/1
- Jockey: (Republic of Ireland) Bobby Beasley
- Trainer: (England) Fred Rimell
- Owner: Charles Vaughan
- Conditions: Good to firm

External videos
- BBC coverage in full
- Highlights of the 1961 Grand National (British Pathé)

The 1961 Grand National was the 115th renewal of the Grand National horse race that took place at Aintree near Liverpool, England, on 25 March 1961.

The winner was 28/1 shot Nicolaus Silver who became the first grey winner for 90 years. He was ridden by jockey Bobby Beasley and trained by Fred Rimell. In second place was last year's winner Merryman II. O'Malley Point finished third, whilst Scottish Flight was fourth. The favourite, Jonjo, finished 7th.

== Finishing order ==
Position	Name	Jockey	Age	Handicap (st-lb)	SP	Distance
01	Nicolaus Silver	Bobby Beasley	9	10-1	28/1	5 Lengths
02	Merryman II	Derek Ancil	10	11-12	8/1	
03	O'Malley Point	Paddy Farrell	10	11-4	100/6	
04	Scottish Flight II	Bill Rees	9	10-6	100/6	
05	Kilmore	Fred Winter	11	11-0	33/1	
06	Wyndburgh	Tim Brookshaw	11	11-5	33/1	
07	Jonjo	Pat Taaffe	11	10-7	7/1	
08	Badanloch	Stan Mellor	10	10-11	20/1	
09	Team Spirit	Willie Robinson	9	10-13	20/1	
10	Siracusa	Jumbo Wilkinson	8	10-1	100/7	
11	Mr. What	David Dick	11	11-9	20/1	
12	Ernest	Johnny East	9	10-1	33/1	
13	Sabaria	Mick Roberts	10	10-2	100/1	
14	Irish Coffee	Jimmy Magee	11	10-6	50/1	

== Non-finishers ==
Fence	Name	Jockey	Age	Handicap (st-lb)	SP	Fate
06	Taxidermist	John Lawrence	9	11-4	40/1	Fell
17	Hunter's Breeze	Francis Carroll	10	10-13	100/7	Fell
01	Floater	Eddie Harty	8	10-11	50/1	Fell
19	Fresh Winds	Roy Edwards	10	10-10	66/1	Unseated Rider
06	Brian Ogue	Joe Guest	10	10-10	100/1	Unseated Rider
15	Bantry Bay	William Pigott-Brown	10	10-7	40/1	Unseated Rider
08	Wily Oriental	Gerry Madden	9	10-6	40/1	Pulled Up
10	Oscar Wilde	Taffy Jenkins	11	10-4	45/1	Fell
09	Jimuru	John Leigh	10	10-4	33/1	Fell
06	Carrasco	Peter Pickford	9	10-3	40/1	Fell
06	Kingstel	George Slack	9	10-0	50/1	Fell
15	Vivant	David Nicholson	8	10-6	50/1	Unseated Rider
01	Tea Fiend	Ron Harrison	12	10-0	40/1	Unseated Rider
01	April Queen	Anthony Biddlecombe	10	10-2	100/1	Fell
16	Grifel	Vladimir Prakhov	8	12-0	100/1	Fell 6th, remounted, Pulled Up after 16th
22	Oxo	Michael Scudamore	10	11-8	20/1	Pulled Up
22	Imposant	Mr R Couetil	9	10-13	100/1	Pulled Up
19	Penny Feather	Johnny Lehane	8	10-1	66/1	Refused
01	Clover Bud	David Mould	11	10-10	50/1	Brought Down
09	Reljef	Boris Pomonarenko	7	12-0	100/1	Unseated Rider
22	Double Crest	Angus Irvine	9	10-7	50/1	Refused

== Media coverage ==
David Coleman presented Grand National Grandstand on the BBC with commentators, Peter O'Sullevan and Peter Montague-Evans guiding them over the 30 fences. Peter Bromley had now moved over to BBC radio after featuring in the first televised National the year before.
