= 1957 Grand National =

English steeplechase horse race

- Grand National
- Location: Aintree Racecourse
- Date: 29 March 1957
- Winning horse: Sundew
- Starting price: 20/1
- Jockey: (England) Fred Winter
- Trainer: Frank Hudson
- Owner: Mrs. Geoffrey Khon
- Conditions: Good

External videos
- Highlights of the 1957 Grand National (British Pathé)

The 1957 Grand National was the 111th renewal of the Grand National horse race that took place at Aintree near Liverpool, England, on 29 March 1957.

It was won by 20/1 shot Sundew, having led the field for much of the race. Sundew was ridden by jockey Fred Winter and trained by Frank Hudson. It was Winter's third attempt at winning the Grand National, and Sundew had run in the steeplechase twice before.

Thirty-five horses ran, including last year's winner E.S.B. all returned safely to the stables.

== Finishing order ==
Position	Name	Jockey	Age	Handicap (st-lb)	SP	Distance
01	Sundew	Fred Winter	11	11-7	20/1	8 Lengths
02	Wyndburgh	Michael Batchelor	7	10-7	25/1	6 Lengths
03	Tiberetta	Alan Oughton	9	10-0	66/1	
04	Glorious Twelfth	Jumbo Wilkinson	8	11-1	100/8	
05	The Crofter	Jimmy Power	9	10-0	66/1	
06	Goosander	Johnny East	9	11-7	5/1	
07	Sydney Jones	Michael Tory	10	10-12	25/1	
08	ESB	David Dick	11	11-13	20/1	
09	Merry Throw	Tim Brookshaw	9	10-12	40/1	
10	Sandy Jane II	Bobby Beasley	10	10-2	40/1	
11	Gentle Moya	George Milburn	11	10-6	28/1	Last to Complete

== Non-finishers ==
Fence	Name	Jockey	Age	Handicap (st-lb)	SP	Fate
01	Hart Royal	Peter Pickford	9	10-10	100/7	Fell
01	Virginius	Alan Lillingston	8	10-12	50/1	Fell
01	Rendezvous III	Arthur Freeman	9	10-6	20/1	Brought Down
03	Go-Well	Piers Bengough	9	10-9	66/1	Fell
04	Armorial III	Johnny Bullock	8	11-1	50/1	Fell
05	Waking	Tony Pearn	13	10-5	66/1	Fell
06	Cherry Abbot	Grenville Underwood	12	10-0	66/1	Fell
06	Irish Lizard	David Nicholson	14	10-2	66/1	Fell
06	Royal Tan	Tosse Taaffe	13	11-12	28/1	Carried Out
08	Fahrenheit	T O'Brien	10	10-0	66/1	Fell
08	Morrcator	Leo McMorrow	10	10-0	50/1	Fell
09	Wild Wisdom	Luther Bridge	12	10-1	66/1	Pulled Up
10	Red Menace	Lawrence Wigham	8	10-0	33/1	Fell
10	Carey's Cottage	Tommy Shone	10	10-6	50/1	Refused
11	Clearing	Bob Curson	10	10-1	45/1	Fell
11	Much Obliged	Michael Scudamore	9	11-4	10/1	Fell
11	Felias	Bill Rees	9	10-5	45/1	Brought Down
11	Tutto	Johnny Lehane	10	10-6	100/6	Fell
11	Iceclough	Pat Taaffe	11	11-3	28/1	Brought Down
16	Monkey Wrench	Rex Hamey	12	10-0	66/1	Pulled Up
20	Rose Park	Graham Nicholls	11	11-13	28/1	Pulled Up
25	Athenian	Derek Ancil	8	10-7	66/1	Fell
28	Four Ten	Bert Morrow	11	11-11	50/1	Fell
30	China Clipper II	Major WD Gibson	10	10-3	66/1	Fell
