= 1950 Grand National =

English steeplechase horse race

- Grand National
- Location: Aintree Racecourse
- Date: 25 March 1950
- Winning horse: (Republic of Ireland) Freebooter
- Starting price: 10/1 F
- Jockey: (Republic of Ireland) Jimmy Power
- Trainer: Bobby Renton
- Owner: Mrs. Lurline Brotherton
- Conditions: Good

External videos
- Highlights of the 1950 Grand National (British Pathé)

The 1950 Grand National was the 104th renewal of the Grand National horse race that took place at Aintree Racecourse near Liverpool, England, on 25 March 1950.

Nearly 500,000 people packed into Aintree for the first royal National since the Second World War. In attendance were King George VI, Queen Elizabeth, their daughter Princess Elizabeth, and a number of other members of the royal family. Royal interest centred on Monaveen, the co-third-favourite who was jointly owned by the Queen and Princess Elizabeth. Despite leading the field, Monaveen made a bad mistake at The Chair, nearly unseating his jockey, and losing significant ground.

The race was won by Freebooter, the 10/1 joint-favourite ridden by Irish jockey Jimmy Power and trained by Bobby Renton for owner Lurline Brotherton. In second place was Wot No Sun, Acthon Major finished third, and Rowland Roy fourth.

Forty-nine horses ran and all returned safely to the stables.

== Finishing order ==
| Position | Name | Jockey | Age | Handicap (st-lb) | SP | Distance |
|---|---|---|---|---|---|---|
| 01 | Freebooter | Jimmy Power | 9 | 11-11 | 10/1 | 15 Lengths |
| 02 | Wot No Sun | Arthur Thompson | 8 | 11-8 | 100/7 | |
| 03 | Acthon Major | Bobby O'Ryan | 10 | 11-2 | 33/1 | |
| 04 | Rowland Roy | Dicky Black | 11 | 11-7 | 40/1 | |
| 05 | Monaveen | Tony Grantham | 9 | 10-13 | 100/7 | |
| 06 | Ship's Bell | Martin O'Dwyer | 10 | 10-0 | 66/1 | |
| 07 | Inchmore | Dick Curran | 13 | 10-0 | 100/1 | Last to complete |

== Non-finishers ==
| Fence | Name | Jockey | Age | Handicap (st-lb) | SP | Fate |
|---|---|---|---|---|---|---|
| 01 | Comeragh | PJ Kelly | 9 | 11-0 | 50/1 | Fell |
| 01 | Cottage Welcome | Charles Hook | 11 | 10-3 | 100/1 | Fell |
| 01 | Ole Man River | G Bonas | 8 | 10-0 | 100/1 | Fell |
| 01 | Russian Hero | Leo McMorrow | 10 | 11-4 | 22/1 | Fell |
| 01 | Tommy Traddles | F O'Connor | 9 | 10-1 | 66/1 | Fell |
| 01 | Zarter | John Straker | 10 | 10-0 | 66/1 | Fell |
| 02 | Skouras | M Browne | 10 | 10-2 | 100/1 | Unseated Rider |
| 02 | Ivan's Choice | PJ O'Brien | 9 | 10-0 | 100/1 | Fell |
| 06 | Ardnacassa | Tim Brookshaw | 12 | 10-5 | 100/1 | Fell |
| 06 | Battling Pedulas | Danny Marzani | 11 | 10-11 | 50/1 | Fell |
| 06 | Cavaliero | Johnny Bullock | 9 | 11-6 | 66/1 | Fell |
| 06 | Gallery | George Slack | 12 | 10-8 | 28/1 | Fell |
| 07 | Roimond | Dick Francis | 9 | 12-1 | 10/1 | Fell |
| 07 | Inverlochy | Patrick Doyle | 11 | 10-3 | 50/1 | Fell |
| 07 | Cadamstown | Eddie Dempsey | 10 | 10-8 | 66/1 | Fell |
| 08 | Limestone Cottage | Jack Dowdeswell | 10 | 10-0 | 100/1 | Fell |
| 09 | Possible | Paddy Conlon | 10 | 10-1 | 50/1 | Fell |
| 09 | Barney VI | Tommy P Burns | 12 | 10-2 | 100/1 | Fell |
| 09 | Knockirr | Tommy Cusack | 10 | 10-4 | 66/1 | Fell |
| 09 | Pastime | C Sleator | 9 | 10-0 | 66/1 | Fell |
| 11 | Royal Mount | Atty Corbett | 11 | 11-0 | 40/1 | Fell |
| 11 | Cromwell | Anthony Mildmay | 9 | 11-4 | 18/1 | Fell |
| 12 | Binghamstown | Louis Furman | 11 | 10-7 | 100/1 | Pulled Up |
| 12 | Southborough | Eddie Reavey | 12 | 10-0 | 100/1 | Fell |
| 23 | Shagreen | Glen Kelly | 9 | 11-8 | 20/1 | Fell |
| 23 | San Michele | Jack Boddy | 10 | 10-0 | 100/1 | Fell |
| 23 | Column | Alf Mullins | 10 | 10-2 | 100/1 | Brought Down |
| 24 | Confucius | C O'Connor | 9 | 10-0 | 40/1 | Pulled Up |
| 24 | Angel Hill | Tommy Shone | 10 | 10-3 | 33/1 | Fell |
| 29 | Cloncarrig | Bob Turnell | 10 | 11-9 | 25/1 | Fell |
| ? | Garde Toi | Alfonso de Portago | 9 | 12-1 | 100/1 | Fell |
| ? | Klaxton | Jack Maguire | 10 | 11-13 | 40/1 | Fell |
| 13 | Stockman | David Thomas | 8 | 11-1 | 100/1 | Fell |
| 23 | Mermaid IV | Mr TB Palmer | 11 | 11-0 | 100/1 | Fell |
| ? | Castledermot | Tim Molony | 8 | 10-9 | 20/1 | Fell |
| ? | Soda II | Keneth Mullins | 9 | 10-5 | 33/1 | Fell |
| ? | Highland Cottage | Matt Hogan | 10 | 10-0 | 66/1 | Fell |
| ? | Happy River | Daniel McCann | 7 | 10-12 | 40/1 | Pulled Up |
| ? | Safety Loch | David Punshon | 9 | 10-0 | 100/1 | Pulled Up |
| ? | Dynovi | Alec Jack | 9 | 10-0 | 100/1 | Brought Down |
| ? | Fighting Line | E Greenway | 11 | 10-8 | 50/1 | Refused |
| ? | Saintfield | M Gosling | 13 | 10-0 | 100/1 | Refused |
