= 1952 Grand National =

English steeplechase horse race

- Grand National
- Location: Aintree Racecourse
- Date: 5 April 1952
- Winning horse: Teal
- Starting price: 100/7
- Jockey: (Republic of Ireland) Arthur P. Thompson
- Trainer: Neville Crump
- Owner: Harry Lane
- Conditions: Good to firm

External videos
- Highlights of the 1952 Grand National (British Pathé)

The 1952 Grand National was the 106th renewal of the Grand National horse race that took place at Aintree Racecourse near Liverpool, England, on 5 April 1952.

The race went off ten minutes late, after the field breached the starting tape, prompting a false start. It was won by Teal, a 100/7 shot ridden by jockey Arthur Thompson and trained by Neville Crump. Thompson and Crump were victorious in the steeplechase in 1948 also, with Sheila's Cottage, at odds of 50/1.

In second place was Legal Joy, third was Wot No Son, and Uncle Barney finished fourth.

Forty-seven horses ran, and all but one returned safely to the stables. Skouras was euthanised after incurred a cervical fracture falling at Becher's Brook.

== Finishing order ==
Position	Name	Jockey	Age	Handicap (st-lb)	SP	Distance
01	Teal	Arthur Thompson	10	10–12	100/7	5 Lengths
02	Legal Joy	Michael Scudamore	9	10–4	100/6	
03	Wot No Sun	David Dick	10	11–7	33/1	
04	Uncle Barney	Jack Boddy	9	10–4	100/1	
05	Overshadow	Eddie Newman	12	10–5	22/1	
06	Printers Pie	George Slack	8	10–0	100/1	
07	Hierba	Alf Mullins	7	10–0	66/1	
08	Column	Peter Pickford	12	10–0	100/1	
09	Parsonshill	Jim Seely	13	10–1	100/1	
10	Sergeant Kelly	Ray Cross	11	10–9	100/1	Last to complete

== Non-finishers ==
Fence	Name	Jockey	Age	Handicap (st-lb)	SP	Fate
01	Early Mist	Pat Taaffe	7	10–11	18/1	Fell
01	Golden Surprise	Mr T Clarke	7	10–3	100/1	Fell
01	Hal's Venture	John Foster	7	10–8	45/1	Fell
01	Rocket VI	Victor Speck	8	10–1	100/1	Fell
01	Russian Hero	Leo McMorrow	12	10–11	50/1	Fell
01	St Kathleen II	Patrick Doyle	9	10–2	50/1	Fell
01	Dominick's Bar	A Prendergast	8	10–13	66/1	Fell
01	Cardinal Error	Jimmy Power	8	11–8	33/1	Brought Down
01	Irish Lizard	Rex Hamey	9	10–3	33/1	Brought Down
01	Court Painter	Francis Carroll	12	10–0	100/1	Refused
03	Cream of the Border	Lex Kelly	7	10–0	50/1	Refused
03	Inter Alia	C Sleator	9	10–3	66/1	Fell
03	Caesar's Wife	Gordon Rogers	10	10–6	50/1	Unseated Rider
03	Whispering Steel	Bert Morrow	7	10–11	40/1	Fell
04	Cloncarrig	William Dugdale	12	11–13	50/1	Fell
04	Nagara	P Hieronimus	10	11–7	100/1	Fell
05	Brown Jack III	Duke of Alburquerque	9	10–0	40/1	Fell
06	Skouras	Mr R Keith	12	10–13	66/1	Fell
07	Pearly Prince	Derek Leslie	9	10–5	25/1	Fell
07	Skyreholme	Dick Francis	9	11–3	40/1	Fell
07	Tantivy	Mr M Westwick	11	11–1	50/1	Fell
07	Wolfschmidt	F O'Connor	12	10–3	100/1	Fell
07	Kelek	Charles Hook	8	10/3	40/1	Refused
08	Possible	Mr E Weymouth	12	11–0	100/1	Fell
09	Another Delight	Glen Kelly	9	10–10	25/1	Fell
13	Starlit Bay	Clive Straker	8	10–3	50/1	Fell
17	Roimond	Tim Molony	11	11–13	33/1	Fell
17	Menzies	Mick O'Dwyer	10	10–4	33/1	Brought Down
21	Border Luck	Tommy Shone	7	10–12	20/1	Unseated Rider
21	Derrinstown	Alan Power	12	10–0	100/1	Pulled Up
21	Tavoy	Daniel McCann	9	10–0	100/1	Pulled Up
22	Traveller's Pride	Len Stephens	9	10–1	100/1	Fell
24	Freebooter	Bryan Marshall	11	12–7	10/1	Fell
24	Royal Stuart	Tim Brookshaw	9	10–3	50/1	Refused
24	Icy Calm	Marquess of Portago	9	11–0	33/1	Pulled Up
30	Royal Tan	Phonsie O'Brien	8	11–6	22/1	Fell
?	Bronze Arrow	John Straker	10	10–2	100/1	Fell
