= Specify =

British-bred Thoroughbred racehorse

- Sire: Specific
- Dam: Ora Lamae
- Sex: Gelding
- Foaled: 1962
- Country: United Kingdom
- Colour: Bay
- Breeder: Alan Parker
- Owner: Fred Pontin
- Trainer: John Sutcliffe

Major wins
- Grand National (1971)

Specify (foaled 1962) was a British-bred Thoroughbred racehorse who competed in National Hunt racing and is noted for winning the 1971 Grand National.

== Background ==
Specify was a bay gelding bred in Norwich, England by Alan Parker. He was initially purchased by Arthur Freeman, a former jockey who had won the 1958 Grand National riding Mr. What. In 1970 Specify was bought by Fred Pontin.

== Racing career ==
They're inside the final furlong now, Black Secret coming to challenge with Specify on the far side Sandy Sprite in between the two, it's Johnny Cook getting up on Specify... It's Specify and Black Secret, Specify is just gonna win it, at the line Specify is the winner!

— Commentator Peter O'Sullevan describes the climax of the 1971 National

Specify won the 1969 Plate Handicap Chase before being bought by Fred Pontin who entered him in the 1970 Grand National where he was brought down at fence 22. He then went on to win the 1971 Grand National in a tightly fought race between five horses, Specify managed to win by a neck. He would then compete in the 1972 Grand National coming in 6th.

== Grand National record ==
Grand National	Position	Jockey	Age	Weight	SP	Distance
1970	DNF	John Cook	8	10-7	100/7	Brought down at fence 22
1971	1st	John Cook	9	10-3	28/1	Neck
1972	6th	Barry Brogan	10	10-11	22/1	
