= 1958 Grand National =

English steeplechase horse race

- Grand National
- Location: Aintree Racecourse
- Date: 29 March 1958
- Winning horse: (Republic of Ireland) Mr. What
- Starting price: 18/1
- Jockey: (England) Arthur Freeman
- Trainer: (Republic of Ireland) Tom Taaffe Sr.
- Owner: David J. Coughlan
- Conditions: Soft

External videos
- Highlights of the 1958 Grand National (British Pathé)
- British Movietone

The 1958 Grand National was the 112th renewal of the Grand National horse race that took place at Aintree near Liverpool, England, on 29 March 1958.

From an initial entry of 56 The field of 31 runners competed for record prize money of nearly £14,000. The race was won by 18/1 shot Mr. What, by a distance of 30 lengths. The eight-year-old was ridden by jockey Arthur Freeman and trained by Tom Taaffe Sr., and became the fifth Irish winner of the Grand National since the Second World War.

== Race Card ==
Thirty two runners were declared to run with Top Twenty, to be ridden by Shortt being withdrawn on the day of the race after bursting a blood vessel when finishing fifth in the Topham Chase two days before the National. There were no late jockey changes from those declared on the race card.

Mr What's trainer Tom Taffe left it until five days before the race to engage Arthur Freeman, as he had wanted his son Tosse to partner his entry. However Tosse was expected to ride the highly fancied Sam Brownthorn and with options for a replacement running out, Taffe booked Freeman, who himself had been left without a mount after losing the ride on Athenian to Derrick Ancil, having two other engagements withdrawn, and losing his standby slot on Never Say When as the injured Stan Mellor was passed fit a week before the race. Although Tosse Taffe did become available to ride forty-eight hours before the race when Sam Brownthorn was withdrawn, Taffe senior stuck to his booking, leaving Taffe junior to partner Brookling instead.

== Finishing order ==
Position	colours	Name	Jockey	Age	Handicap (st-lb)	SP	Distance
01	Maroon, Maroon and Yellow hooped sleeves, Yellow cap with maroon hoop	Mr. What	Arthur Freeman	8	10-6	18/1	30 Lengths
02	Maroon and Yellow halved, sleeves reversed, yellow cap	Tiberetta	George Slack	10	10-6	28/1	15 Lengths
03	Eton blue	Green Drill	George Milburn	8	10-10	28/1	
04	Cerise	Wyndburgh	Michael Batchelor	8	11-3	6/1	
05	White, Hay tartan cross belts	Goosander	Tim Molony	10	11-7	100/7	
06	Green, white hoop and armlets	ESB	David Dick	12	11-12	28/1	
07	Yellow, Green striped sleeves, quartered cap	Holly Bank	Peter Brookshaw	11	10-13	50/1	Last to Complete

== Broadcasting and Media ==
With Mrs Topham continuing to refuse to allow the BBC to broadcast the race on Television, coverage of the race remained restricted to a thirty-minute radio broadcast at 3pm on the BBC Light Programme. This was the twenty-seventh consecutive renewal, dating back to 1927 to be covered by BBC radio.

Filming the race remained the preserve of the two major newsreel services, Pathe and Movietone, with both rapidly releasing their newsreels of the race as early as that evening in some local cinemas as a special in its own right, rather than as part of their normal newsreel service.

The Daily Mirror, Daily Herald, Daily Express and Daily Mail all carried extensive previews of the race

== Non-finishers ==
Fence	Colours	Name	Jockey	Age	Handicap (st-lb)	SP	Fate
02	Cream, Purple striped sleeves & cap	Longmead	Willie Robinson	8	11-1	28/1	Fell
05	Crimson, Old gold sleeves & cap	Rendezvous III	Johnny Bullock	10	10-3	45-1	Fell
05	Yellow, Black cap	Princess Garter	William Roberts	11	10-3	66/1	Fell
05	Chocolate with Yellow cross belts	Valiant Spark	Michael Scudamore	9	10-7	20/1	Fell
06	Dark blue with light blue hoop and sleeves, white cap	Must	Bert Morrow	10	10-1	50/1	Fell
06	Yellow with black belt & cap	Sentina	Pat Taaffe	8	10-11	18/1	Brought Down
06	Dark blue with pale blues sleeves & collar	Frozen Credit	Peter Ransom	12	10-12	66/1	Refused
07	Orange with black & white quartered cap	Comedian's Folly	Derrick Scott	10	10-0	66/1	Refused
11	Black with scarlet cap	Glorious Twelfth	Jumbo Wilkinson	9	11-3	28/1	Refused
13	Grey with black & white quartered cap	Brookling	Tosse Taaffe	9	10-3	28/1	Fell
15	Grey with scarlet sleeves, collar, braid & cap	Ace Of Trumps	Paddy Farrell	10	10-12	40/1	Pulled Up
16	Straw with pink sleeves & cap	Richardstown	James Morrissey	10	10-0	40/1	Fell
17	Grey with white sleeves & gold cap	Moston Lane	Taffy Jenkins	9	10-0	66/1	Refused
18	Yellow with white hoop & red cap	Colledge Master	Bill Rees	8	11-2	25/1	Pulled-Up
19	Chocolate with yellow collar, cuffs & cap	Athenian	Derek Ancil	9	10-11	22/1	Fell
19	Turquoise blue with pink hooped sleeves and cap	Never Say When	Stan Mellor	9	10-2	50/1	Fell
19	Pink with black hooped sleeves & quartered cap	Southerntown	Patrick Cowley	12	10-1	66/1	Unseated Rider
19	Madonna blue & brown quartered	Springsilver	Fred Winter	8	10-4	18/1	Refused
19	Blue & silver hoops with quartered cap	Wise Child	Stan Hayhurst	10	11-6	45-1	Pulled-Up
20	Purple with pink sleeves & cap with purple spots	The Crofter	Jimmy Power	10	10-0	40-1	Fell
22	Pale blue with tan sleeves & cap	Pippykin	Tim Brookshaw	10	10-5	22/1	Fell
22	Mauve with yellow sleeves, mauve armlets & yellow cap	Sydney Jones	Michael Tory	11	10-12	28/1	Brought Down
22	White with black hoop, armlet, collar and cuffs with quartered cap	Hart Royal	Peter Pickford	10	10-11	18/1	Refused
28	Dark blue with two pale green diagonal stripes and hoop on cap	Eagle Lodge	Alan Oughton	9	10-0	18/1	Pulled Up

Pathe's footage of the race shows that Comedian's Folly refused twice at the sixth fence {Becher's Brook} clearing it only at the third attempt, while Sentina also appears to fall rather than being brought down.

=== Post Race ===
Trainer Neville Crump told the press after the race that his Goosander would not be entered again for the National. "I don't say that he will never run at Aintree again, but he obviously doesn't stay the full National distance." he stated after the horse finished a tired fifth.

Jockey Peter Pickford advised the same of Hart Royal, stating "He just hated the big fences all the way and I could never get anywhere near the leaders."

Bill Rees expressed similar sentiments of Colledge Master who he said "made a hole big enough in the seventeenth fence to walk through."

Derrick Ancil reported that his mount, Athenian's race ended at the nineteenth fence, stuck with "Forelegs on one side and hind legs on the other."

Mrs Topham was forced to defend the race after a combination of poor weather and moving from a Friday to a Saturday led to a notciably reduced attendance in the enclosures and out in the extremes of the course. However, she blamed the Tote, claiming that their "4s minimum stake to get into the enclosures puts people off. If the Tote would reduce this to 2s then people would come flocking back, not just to the Grand National but to all race courses."
