= 1956 Grand National =

English steeplechase horse race

- Grand National
- Location: Aintree Racecourse
- Date: 24 March 1956
- Winning horse: (Republic of Ireland) E.S.B.
- Starting price: 100/7
- Jockey: (England) Dave Dick
- Trainer: (England) Fred Rimell
- Owner: Mrs. Leonard Carver
- Conditions: Good

External videos
- Highlights of the 1956 Grand National (British Pathé)

The 1956 Grand National was the 110th renewal of the Grand National horse race that took place at Aintree near Liverpool, England, on 24 March 1956.

It is probably best remembered for Devon Loch's sudden and inexplicable fall on the final straight, just 40 yards from a certain victory. The incident is almost always replayed during television build-up coverage on Grand National day.

Owned by Queen Elizabeth The Queen Mother and ridden by Dick Francis, the well-fancied Devon Loch held a five-length lead over his nearest challenger, E.S.B., on the run-in to the finishing post, when he suddenly half-jumped into the air and landed in a bellyflop on his stomach, allowing E.S.B. to overtake and win. Although Francis tried to cajole the horse, it was unable to continue.

== Finishing order ==
Position	Name	Jockey	Age	Handicap (st-lb)	SP	Distance
01	ESB	David Dick	10	11-3	100/7	10 Lengths
02	Gental Moya	George Milburn	10	10-2	22/1	
03	Royal Tan	Toss Taaffe	12	12-1	28/1	
04	Eagle Lodge	Alan Oughton	7	10-1	66/1	
05	Ken Royal	Tim Molony	8	10-8	28/1	
06	Martinique	Stan Mellor	10	10-0	40/1	
07	Carey's Cottage	Bob Turnell	9	10-13	10/1	
08	Clearing	Johnny Bullock	9	10-1	66/1	
09	Wild Wisdom	Luther Bridge	11	10-1	66/1	Last to Complete

== Non-finishers ==
Fence	Name	Jockey	Age	Handicap (st-lb)	SP	Fate
01	Early Mist	Bryan Marshall	11	12-2	25/1	Fell
01	High Guard	Arthur Thompson	9	11-1	22/1	Fell
01	Must	Bert Morrow	8	10-10	7/1	Fell
01	Reverend Prince	Mr C Pocock	10	10-5	40/1	Fell
03	No Response	Cathal Finnegan	10	10-1	50/1	Fell
04	Mariner's Log	Rene Emery	9	11-11	22/1	Fell
11	Merry Windsor	Leo McMorrow	8	10-10	28/1	Fell
12	Athenian	Rex Hamey	7	10-3	66/1	Fell
18	Border Luck	Mick O'Dwyer	11	10-0	66/1	Refused
18	M'as Tu Vu	Arthur Freeman	10	10-6	40/1	Fell
19	Dunboy II	Bobby Brewis	12	11-0	66/1	Fell
19	Polonius	Gene Kelly	10	10-3	66/1	Refused
19	Domata	Derek Ancil	10	10-4	66/1	Fell
21	Witty	Paddy Farrell	11	10-4	66/1	Fell
22	Sundew	Fred Winter	10	11-4	8/1	Fell
22	Pippykin	Jimmy Power	8	10-0	100/7	Refused
26	Armorial III	Jack Dowdeswell	7	10-10	20/1	Fell
26	Much Obliged	Michael Scudamore	8	11-0	50/1	Fell
29	Ontray	Dick Curran	8	10-0	100/6	Fell
(Run-in)	Devon Loch	Dick Francis	10	11-4	100/7	Slipped Up

== Media coverage and aftermath ==
Aintree maintained a refusal to allow the race to be broadcast either live or delayed by any Television company, the BBC having submitted a request every year since 1946. However, The BBC's rights to broadcast the race live on radio remained in place, making this the twenty-fifth consecutive live coverage of the race since 1927. The race was broadcast live on the BBC Light Programme from 3pm with Raymond Glendenning calling in the winner while Michael O'Hehir and Peter O'Sullevan called the action out in the country. Claude Harrison, Bob Haynes, and Aubrey Renwick assisted by calling competitors that dropped out of the race. As per all previous years, part of the agreement to broadcast was that the copyright for the recording would be held by Tophams and not the BBC.

E.S.B.'s jockey Dave Dick said of his unexpected win: "Devon Loch had me stone cold. I was a terribly lucky winner." Devon Loch's owner Queen Elizabeth The Queen Mother famously said of the incident: "Oh, that's racing!" For jockey Dick Francis, his mount's bizarre collapse on the run-in to victory in the world's most famous steeplechase remained a "terrible memory, even after all these years." Devon Loch's was not the first time a horse had seemed to jump some form of ghost fence on the run in of the National. In 1901, Arthur Nightingall's race was well won on board Grudon when his mount also made to jump a fence that wasn't there. On that occasion the pair recovered and had sufficient time to continue and win the race.
