= Nicolaus Silver =

Irish-bred Thoroughbred racehorse

- Sire: Nicolaus
- Grandsire: Solario
- Dam: Rays of Montrose
- Damsire: Montrose
- Sex: Gelding
- Foaled: 1952
- Country: Ireland
- Colour: Grey
- Breeder: James Heffernan
- Owner: Charles Vaughan
- Trainer: Fred Rimell

Major wins
- Grand National (1961); Fulke Walwyn Kim Muir Challenge Cup (1961)

Nicolaus Silver was a racehorse noted for winning the 1961 Grand National.

Nicolaus Silver, a grey horse, was bred in County Tipperary, Ireland, by James Heffernan. He was by Nicolaus, out of another grey, Rays of Montrose. After he raced in Ireland, his trainer Dan Kirwan of Lower Grange, Gowran, County Kilkenny, died suddenly in 1960, which led the eight-year-old to be sold at the Dublin Ballsbridge sales in November 1960, where he drew keen bidding due to the knowledge that he was already qualified for the Aintree Grand National and was bought for £2,600 by Charles Vaughan. He was sent to England to be trained by Fred Rimell at Kinnersley. The horse won the Aintree Grand National in 1961. At that time, Nicolaus Silver was only the second grey horse to win the race since its first running in 1839. There was not another grey winner until Neptune Collonge in 2012.

Ridden by jockey Bobby Beasley, Nicolaus Silver started at odds of 28/1 in a field of thirty-five runners for the 1961 National. He was among the leaders from early on the second circuit and drew clear over the last two fences to win by five lengths. It was Rimell's second National win following the 1956 with ESB. Prior to the race, Nicolaus Silver had been the target of dopers.

Nicolaus Silver completed the course in the next two Grand Nationals, finishing seventh in 1962 and tenth in 1963.
