= 1948 Grand National =

English steeplechase horse race

- Grand National
- Location: Aintree Racecourse
- Date: 20 March 1948
- Winning horse: Sheila's Cottage
- Starting price: 66/1
- Jockey: (Republic of Ireland) Arthur Thompson
- Trainer: Neville Crump
- Owner: John Proctor
- Conditions: Good

External videos
- Highlights of the 1948 Grand National (British Pathé)

The 1948 Grand National was the 102nd renewal of the Grand National horse race that took place at Aintree Racecourse near Liverpool, England, on 20 March 1948.

The race was won by the mare Sheila's Cottage at odds of 66/1. The winning jockey was Arthur Thompson and Neville Crump trained the winner. The pairing of Thompson and Crump won the Grand National again in 1952.

Sheila's Cottage became the first mare to win the National for 46 years, and only the 12th in the long history of the steeplechase.

First of the Dandies finished second, with Cromwell third and Happy Home fourth. Forty-three horses ran and all returned safely to the stables.

== Finishing order ==
Position	Name	Jockey	Age	Handicap (st-lb)	SP	Distance
01	Sheila's Cottage	Arthur Thompson	9	10-7	50/1	1 Length
02	First of the Dandies	Jimmy Brogan	11	10-4	25/1	
03	Cromwell	Anthony Mildmay	7	10-11	33/1	
04	Happy Home	Glen Kelly	9	11-10	33/1	
05	Platypus	Alec Jack	7	10-6	66/1	
06	Rowland Boy	Bryan Marshall	9	11-8	100/9	
07	Parthenon	Patrick Murray	9	10-0	100/1	
08	Maltese Wanderer	Kevin Gilsenan	9	10-0	100/1	
09	Offaly Prince	Mr A Parker	9	10-5	100/1	
10	Klaxton	Ron Smyth	8	11-8	40/1	
11	War Risk	Bob Turnell	9	11-1	33/1	
12	Revelry	Dan Moore	8	11-6	33/1	
13	Schubert	Leo McMorrow	14	10-2	66/1	
14	Lovely Cottage	Charles Hook	11	11-4	66/1	

== Non-finishers ==
Fence	Name	Jockey	Age	Handicap (st-lb)	SP	Fate
08	Roimond	Dicky Black	7	11-7	22/1	Fell
?	Caddie II	Jack Maguire	10	11-7	50/1	Fell
06	Silver Fame	Martin Molony	9	11-6	9/1	Fell
01	Bricett	Tim Molony	11	11-3	100/1	Fell
21	Rearmament	Daniel Ruttle	11	11-2	66/1	Fell
14	Cloncarrig	John Hislop	8	10-13	22/1	Fell
?	Clonaboy	E Hannigan	10	10-10	66/1	Fell
?	Gormanstown	Matt Hogan	8	10-9	66/1	Fell
19	Housewarmer	Frenchie Nicholson	11	10-6	25/1	Fell
?	Sir John	Cecil Blacker	7	10-3	100/1	Fell
10	Tudor Close	Tommy Maher	11	10-3	100/1	Fell
?	Loyal Antrim	Eddie Newman	11	10-3	22/1	Fell
?	Ulster Monarch	John Eustace-Smith	9	10-1	100/1	Fell
?	Musical Lad	M Browne	11	10-1	100/1	Fell
03	Ultra Bene	Tony Grantham	9	10-1	100/1	Fell
?	Le Daim	Nicky Pinch	9	10-1	100/1	Fell
?	Soda II	H Bonneau	7	10-0	40/1	Fell
?	Highland Lad	E Kennedy	9	10-0	50/1	Fell
02	Some Chicken	Bill Redmond	11	10-0	50/1	Fell
01	Serpentine	Cyril Mitchell	10	10-0	100/1	Fell
?	Bora's Cottage	Ernest Vinall	10	10-0	100/1	Fell
?	Caughoo	Eddie Dempsey	9	11-1	28/1	Pulled Up
?	Lough Conn	Jimmy Fitzgerald	12	10-5	22/1	Pulled Up
?	Skouras	Alan Power	8	10-0	100/1	Pulled Up
?	Weevil	Vince Mooney	9	10-11	33/1	Brought Down
?	Tommy Traddles	C Harrison	7	10-0	100/1	Unseated Rider
?	Halcyon Hours	Mick Prendergast	8	11-5	50/1	Refused
?	Prince Regent	Tim Hyde	13	12-2	25/1	Carried Out
30	Zahia	Eddie Reavey	8	10-2	100/1	Ran Out
