= 1947 Grand National =

English steeplechase horse race

- Grand National
- Location: Aintree Racecourse
- Date: 29 March 1947
- Winning horse: (Republic of Ireland) Caughoo
- Starting price: 100/1
- Jockey: (Republic of Ireland) Eddie Dempsey
- Trainer: (Republic of Ireland) Herbert McDowell
- Owner: (Republic of Ireland) John J. McDowell
- Conditions: Heavy

External videos
- Highlights of the 1947 Grand National (British Pathé)

The 1947 Grand National was the 101st renewal of the renewal of the Grand National horse race that took place at Aintree Racecourse near Liverpool, England, on 29 March 1947.

The race was won by 100/1 Irish outsider Caughoo. The eight-year-old was ridden by 35-year-old jockey Eddie Dempsey and trained by Herbert McDowell, for owner John McDowell who had bought Caughoo for £50. The Irish Lough Conn finished in second place, Kami, from France, was third, and Prince Regent, also from Ireland, fourth.

Fifty-seven horses ran – the largest field since 1929 when 66 participated – and all returned safely to the stables.

== Finishing order ==
Position	Name	Jockey	Age	Handicap (st-lb)	SP	Distance
01	Caughoo	Eddie Dempsey	8	10-0	100/1	20 lengths
02	Lough Conn	Daniel McCann	11	10-1	33/1	4 Lengths
03	Kami	John Hislop	10	10-13	33/1	
04	Prince Regent	Tim Hyde	12	12-7	8/1	
05	Some Chicken	Bob Turnell	10	10-2	40/1	
06	Housewarmer	Bobby O'Ryan	10	10-6	25/1	
07	Refugio	F Adams	9	11-0	100/1	
08	Kilnaglory	Bryan Marshall	12	11-1	40/1	
09	Clyduffe	Matt Hogan	12	10-0	50/1	
10	Ocultor	Mr D Owen	12	11-0	100/1	
11	Toyette	Major R Waugh-Harris	10	10-6	100/1	
12	Halcyon Hours	M Gordon	7	11-2	50/1	
13	Brick Bat	Eddie Newman	8	10-0	66/1	
14	Schubert	Cliff Beechener	13	10-11	66/1	
15	Leap Man	Fred Rimell	10	11-0	50/1	
16	Brighter Sandy	John Eustace-Smith	9	10-7	66/1	
17	Rearmament	Glen Kelly	10	11-1	33/1	
18	Rowland Boy	Dicky Black	8	10-3	66/1	
19	Handy Lad	Capt W Williams	12	10-0	100/1	

== Non-finishers ==
Fence	Name	Jockey	Age	Handicap (st-lb)	SP	Fate
24	Bricett	MC Prendergast	10	11-1	22/1	Fell
01	Revelry	Dan Moore	7	10-12	100/6	Fell
28	Silver Fame	Bobby Petre	8	10-12	33/1	Fell
28	Jack Finlay	William Kidney	8	10-8	33/1	Fell
06	Luan Casca	Aubrey Brabazon	7	10-7	22/1	Fell
03	Bullington	Jack Bissill	11	10-6	66/1	Fell
01	EP	Martin Molony	12	10-5	100/1	Fell
19	Klaxton	J Maguire	7	10-5	66/1	Fell
24	Musical Lad	MJ Prendergast	10	10-4	33/1	Fell
11	Bogskar	Roger Burford	14	10-4	100/1	Fell
13	First of the Dandies	J Moloney	10	10-3	66/1	Fell
22	MacMoffat	Ian Alder	15	10-4	100/1	Fell
12	Sheila's Cottage	Arthur Thompson	8	10-1	40/1	Fell
03	Michael's Pearl	Eddie Reavey	8	10-0	100/1	Fell
19	Bomber Command	Andrew Jarvis	8	10-0	100/1	Fell
12	Parthenon	Patrick Murray	8	10-0	40/1	Fell
26	Soda II	Fred Gurney	6	10-2	50/1	Fell
09	Prattler	Paddy Conlon	12	10-0	50/1	
22	Black Jennifer	Joe Sheenan	7	10-0	50/1	Fell
27	Double Sam	H Haley	12	10-0	100/1	Fell
15	Gyppo	Mr J Cousins	13	10-0	100/1	Fell
23	Good Date	Jack Dowdeswell	9	10-0	100/1	Fell
12	Border Bob	John Neely	9	10-0	100/1	Fell
19	Tribune	Kevin Gilsenan	13	10-0	100/1	Fell
19	Oh Joe	Ernest Vinall	7	10-0	100/1	Fell
08	Shanakill	Bill Denson	9	10-0	100/1	Fell
06	Day Dreams	M Browne	8	10-0	100/1	Pulled Up
09	Linthill	P Taylor	11	10-0	100/1	Pulled Up
04	Wicklow Wolf	MJ Hogan	7	10-0	100/1	Pulled Up
21	Yung-Yat	Jimmy Brogan	11	10-1	100/1	Pulled Up
28	Gormanstown	Tim Molony	7	10-9	40/1	Pulled Up
20	Domino	Danny Morgan	7	10-0	28/1	Pulled Up
Unknown	Martin M	Major WH Skrine	7	10-0	66/1	Pulled Up
28	Jubilee Flight	E Hannigan	12	10-0	100/1	Pulled Up
24	Grecian Victory	Peter Lay	10	10-0	100/1	Brought Down
28	Tulyra	Derek Jackson	11	10-0	100/1	Refused
12	Granitza	N Dixon	8	10-0	100/1	Refused
03	Patrickswell	Peter Cahalin	9	10-0	100/1	Carried Out
