= 1959 Grand National =

English steeplechase horse race

- Grand National
- Location: Aintree Racecourse
- Date: 21 March 1959
- Winning horse: (England) Oxo
- Starting price: 8/1
- Jockey: (England) Michael Scudamore
- Trainer: Willie Stephenson
- Owner: John E. Bigg
- Conditions: Good

External videos
- Highlights of the 1959 Grand National (British Pathé)
- British Movietone

The 1959 Grand National was the 113th renewal of the Grand National horse race that took place at Aintree Racecourse near Liverpool, on 21 March 1959.

The race was won by the 8/1 second-favourite Oxo, ridden by Michael Scudamore and trained by Willie Stephenson. Thirty-four horses ran, including the previous year's winner Mr. What, who finished third. Wyndburgh was second and Tiberetta was the only other finisher, each finishing in the places for the third consecutive year.

There was one equine fatality during the race: Henry Purcell, who was one of fourteen horses to fall or be brought down at Becher's Brook. Additionally, Slippery Serpent broke a bone in his leg in falling at the thirteenth fence and was euthanised during the week after the race. A debate was held in parliament and the Home Secretary, Rab Butler, met the National Hunt Committee in response to safety concerns raised by the League Against Cruel Sports.

== Finishing order ==
Position	Name	Jockey	Age	Handicap (st-lb)	SP	Distance
01	Oxo	Michael Scudamore	8	10-13	8/1	
02	Wyndburgh	Tim Brookshaw	9	10-12	10/1	
03	Mr. What	Tosse Taaffe	9	11-9	6/1	
04	Tiberetta	Alan Oughton	11	10-9	20/1	Last to Complete

== Non-finishers ==
Fence	Name	Jockey	Age	Handicap (st-lb)	SP	Fate
01	Nic Atkins	Francis Shortt	8	10-1	20/1	Fell
01	Stop List	Tommy Shone	10	10-1	66/1	Fell
02	Southerntown	Patrick Cowley	13	10-0	100/1	Fell
04	Oscar Wilde	Taffy Jenkins	9	10-4	28/1	Fell
06	Done Up	Fred Winter	9	10-3	100/7	Brought Down
06	Eternal	Peter Major	8	10-4	50/1	Fell
06	Glorious Twelfth	George Slack	10	10-7	33/1	Brought Down
06	Henry Purcell	Anthony Keen	12	10-0	100/1	Fell
06	Mr Gay	Derek Ancil	12	10-9	28/1	Brought Down
06	Sundawn III	Jimmy Power	10	10-0	100/1	Brought Down
06	The Crofter	Stan Mellor	11	10-0	100/1	Fell
06	Valiant Spark	Johnny Lehane	10	10-3	40/1	Fell
11	Belsize II	Mr G Rooney	10	10-0	28/1	Fell
12	Dondrosa	Mr CB Taylor	7	10-11	66/1	Refused
13	Slippery Serpent	Pat Taaffe	8	10-11	9/1	Fell
14	Richardstown	Francis Carroll	11	10-1	66/1	Pulled Up
17	Royal Tournament	Bert Morrow	8	10-0	100/1	Refused
22	Irish Coffee	Cathal Finnegan	9	10-5	33/1	Fell
22	Kerstin	Stan Hayhurst	9	12-0	25/1	Fell
22	Kilballyown	E McKenzie	12	10-2	33/1	Brought Down
22	Mainstown	Michael Batchelor	9	10-10	40/1	Fell
22	Soltown	William Brennan	7	10-3	25/1	Fell
22	Surprise Packet	Gerry Scott	10	10-5	100/1	Fell
24	Cannobie Lee	David Nicholson	8	10-10	45/1	Fell
24	Green Drill	George Milburn	9	10-6	22/1	Fell
24	Vigor	Bill Rees	11	10-5	66/1	Fell
24	Turmoil	John Hudson	9	10-1	20/1	Pulled Up
24	Pintail	Jumbo Wilkinson	10	10-4	100/1	Pulled Up
26	John Jacques	Johnny East	10	11-0	33/1	Fell
28	Eagle Lodge	Johnny Bullock	10	10-0	45/1	Refused

== First to be filmed in colour? ==
The Cinema series 'Look at Life' followed Oxo to Aintree and filmed the National in colour, claiming to be the first time the race was screened in such a way.

== Post race controversy ==
The debate regarding the safety of the race rolled into June when Mirabel Topham issued a rebuke of a claim that twenty-four horses had been injured during the race. Mrs Topham reported that every horse was checked by three stable lads after the race who reported that Mr What had an abrasion, Tiberetta a scratch and Eternal a cut lip.
