= 2011 Irish presidential election =

- 27 October 2011
- Opinion polls
- Registered: 3,191,157
- Turnout: 56.1% (▲8.5 pp) (Note: Based on the last contested election in 1997)
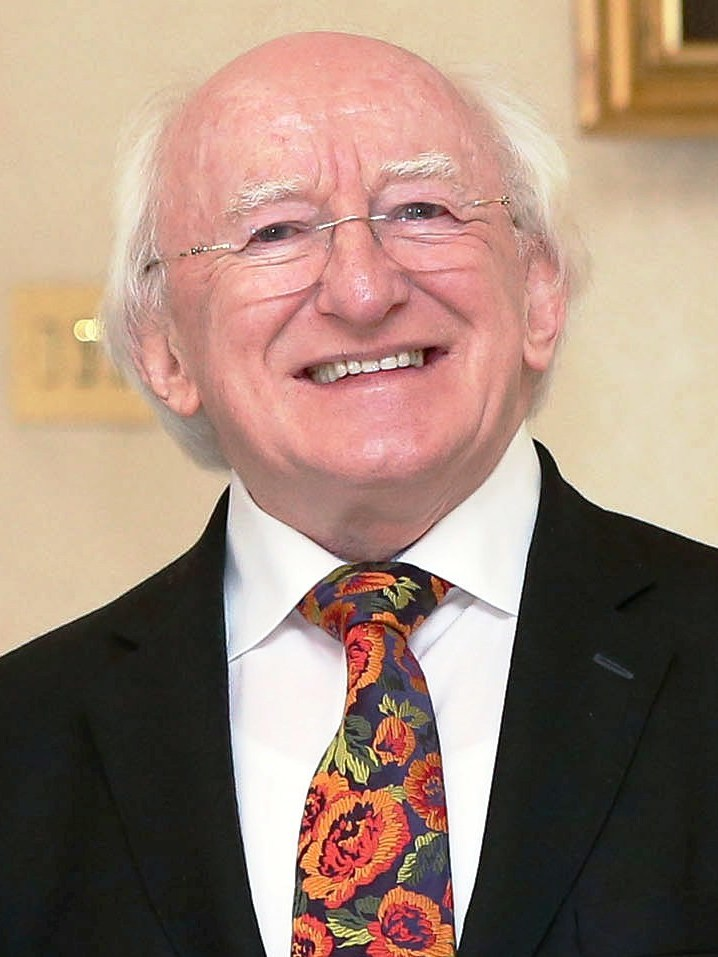

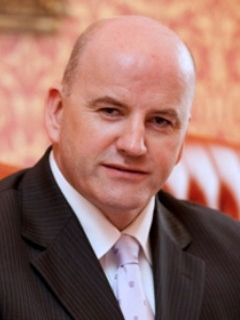

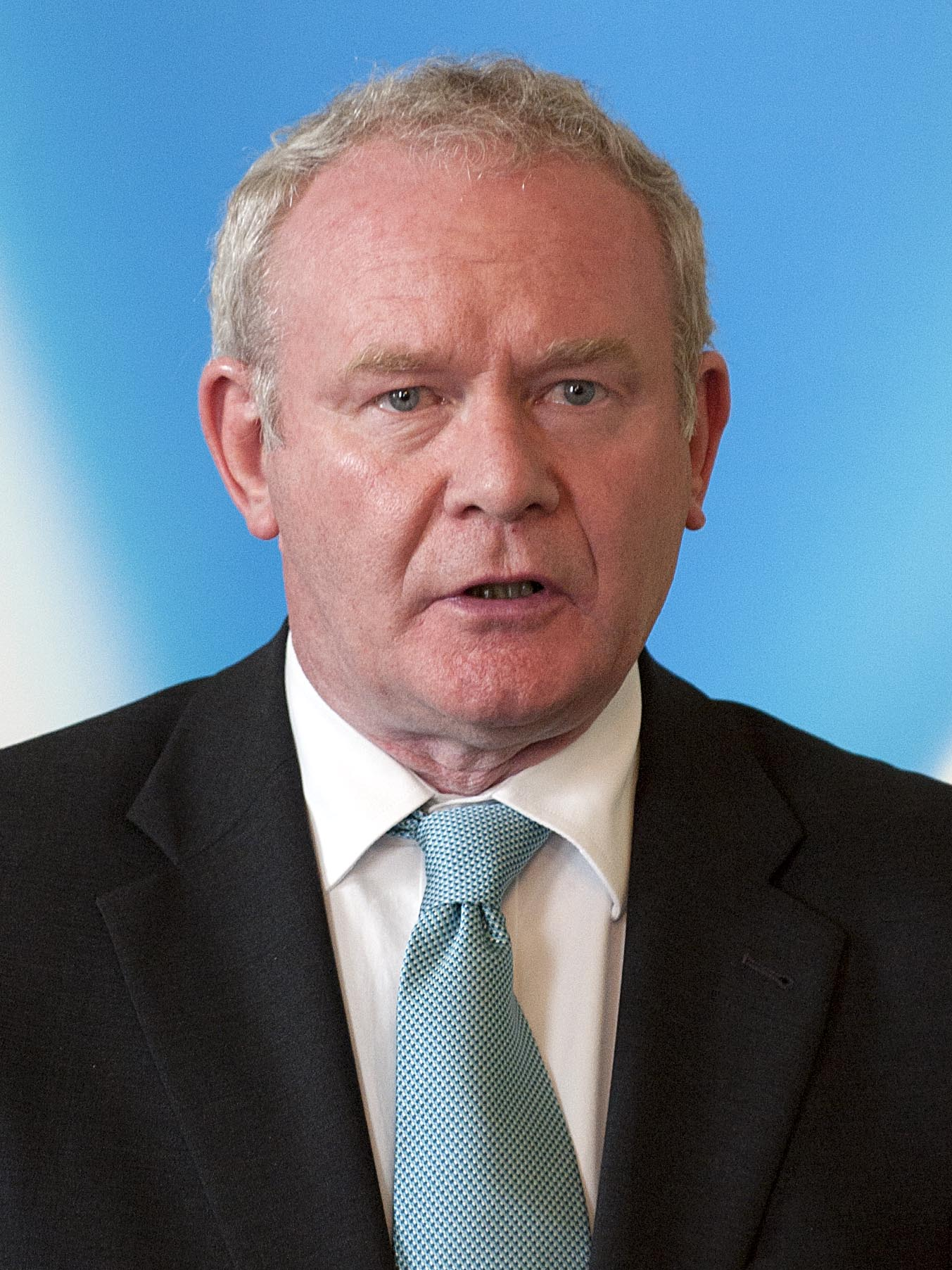

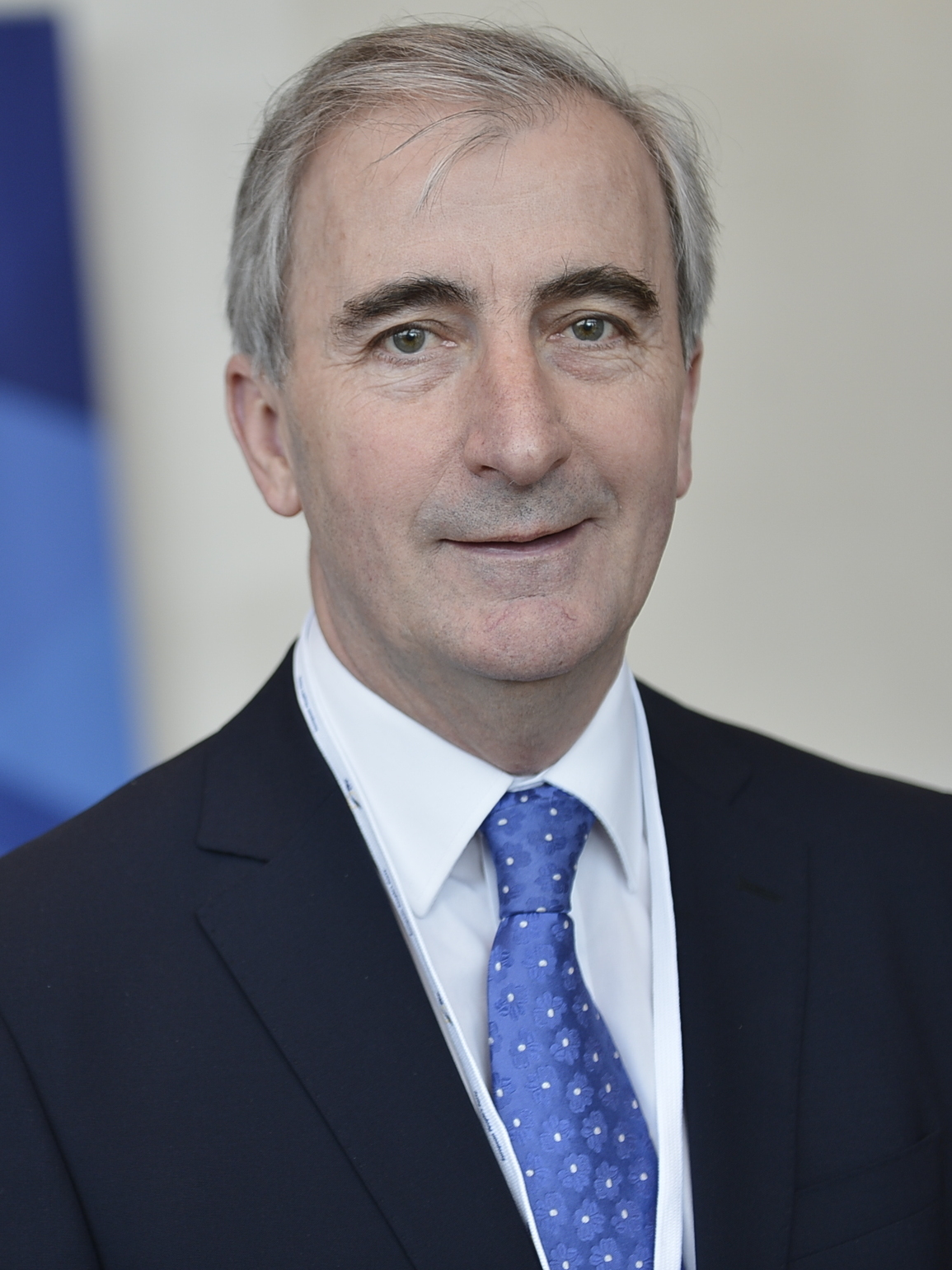

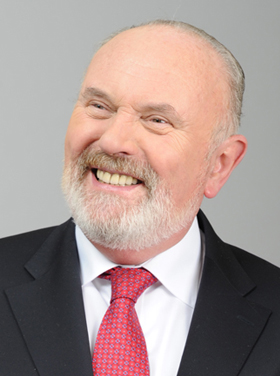

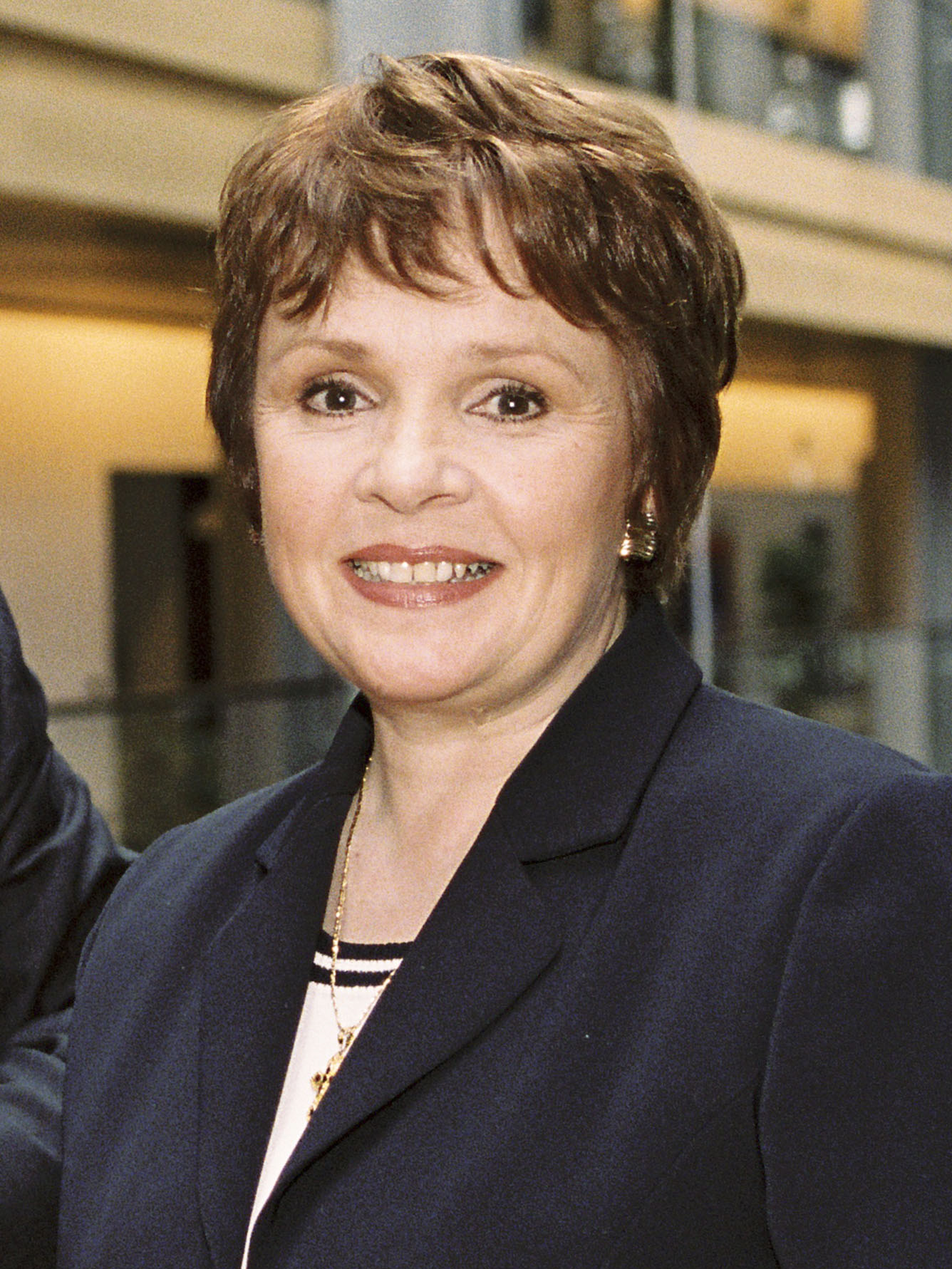

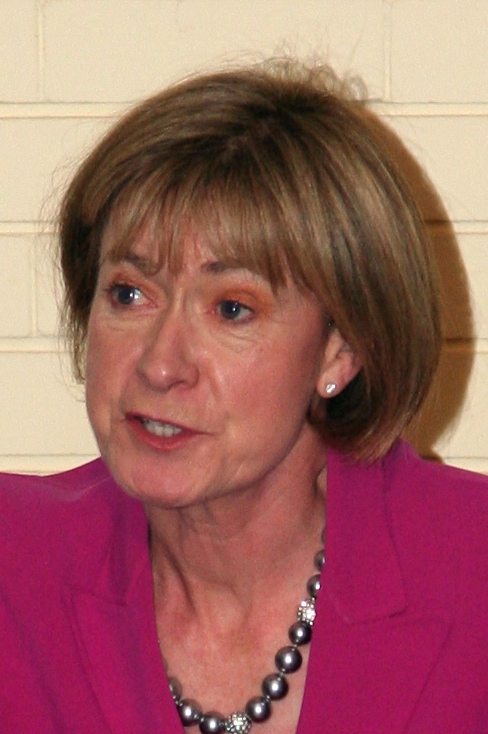
Nominee	Michael D. Higgins	Seán Gallagher	Martin McGuinness
Party	Labour	Independent	Sinn Féin
1st preference	701,101 (39.6%)	504,964 (28.5%)	243,030 (13.7%)
Final count	1,007,104 (56.8%)	628,114 (35.5%)	Eliminated
Nominee	Gay Mitchell	David Norris	Dana Rosemary Scallon
Party	Fine Gael	Independent	Independent
1st preference	113,321 (6.4%)	109,469 (6.2%)	51,220 (2.9%)
Final count	Eliminated	Eliminated	Eliminated
Nominee	Mary Davis
Party	Independent
1st preference	48,657 (2.7%)
Final count	Eliminated
- First-preference results by Dáil constituency.
President before election
Mary McAleese
Independent
Elected President
Michael D. Higgins
Labour

A presidential election was held in Ireland on Thursday, 27 October 2011, and was contested by a record seven candidates. The election was held to elect a successor to Mary McAleese, with the winner to be inaugurated as the ninth President of Ireland on 11 November 2011. Two constitutional referendums and a by-election for a vacant Dáil seat in the Dublin West constituency took place on the same day.

The seven candidates were Mary Davis, Seán Gallagher, Michael D. Higgins, Martin McGuinness, Gay Mitchell, David Norris and Dana Rosemary Scallon. Higgins was nominated by Labour, McGuinness by Sinn Féin and Mitchell by Fine Gael, while Independent candidates Davis, Gallagher, Norris and Scallon were nominated by local authorities. The previously dominant Fianna Fáil party declined to nominate a candidate following their disastrous general election campaign earlier that year. Michael D. Higgins was ultimately elected as president. Higgins also became the first politician in Irish history to obtain over 700,000 first preference votes and over one million votes in a final count.

To date, this is the most recent Irish presidential election that required additional counts.

== Procedure ==
To qualify, candidates had to:

- be a citizen of Ireland
- be at least 35 years of age
- be nominated by:
  - at least twenty of the 226 serving members of the Houses of the Oireachtas (parliament), or
  - at least four of the 34 county or city councils, or
  - themself, in the case of a former president who has served one term.

Presidential elections are conducted under the Presidential Elections Act 1993, as amended. Constitutionally, the election must be held not more than 60 days before the ending of the term of office of the incumbent, or within 60 days of the office becoming vacant. On 27 July the government announced that the election would be held on 27 October 2011. An order was made on 30 August by the Minister for the Environment, Community and Local Government declaring 28 September to be the last day on which nominations could be received. The election was conducted by means of the alternative vote (also called instant runoff voting), which is the single-winner analogue of the single transferable vote used in other Irish elections. Although the constitution calls the system "proportional representation by means of the single transferable vote", a single-winner election cannot be proportional. All Irish citizens entered on the current electoral register were eligible to vote.

== Nomination campaign ==
Following the general election in February 2011, as well as subsequent Seanad election, only three political parties had the 20 members of Oireachtas required to nominate a candidate: Fine Gael (76 TDs and 19 senators), the Labour Party (37 TDs and 13 senators) and Fianna Fáil (19 TDs and 14 senators). Sinn Féin, the next largest party in the Dáil Éireann, had 14 TDs and 3 senators. For other candidates to be nominated by Oireachtas members, support would have been required from members of smaller parties, independents (of which there were then 14 TDs and 11 senators) or excess members of the three larger parties.

=== Fine Gael ===
Gay Mitchell, MEP for Dublin and former TD for Dublin South-Central was chosen as the Fine Gael candidate at a special convention held on 9 July 2011.

Fine Gael had initially produced a shortlist of three candidates in March 2011: John Bruton, Seán Kelly and Mairead McGuinness. Bruton, a former Taoiseach and European Union Ambassador, ruled himself out of the contest on 28 May 2011. Kelly, an MEP and former President of the Gaelic Athletic Association indicated on 1 June 2011 that he would not be seeking the party's nomination, and wished to continue serving in the European Parliament. The party approached Nobel laureate poet Seamus Heaney in late 2010, but Heaney declined to stand unless he was an agreed cross-party candidate.

Four candidates sought nomination at the party convention in July 2011:

- Gay Mitchell, MEP for Dublin and former TD for Dublin South-Central. He had announced that he would be seeking the party's nomination in June 2011, having been contacted by "a large number of senior figures in the party".
- Pat Cox, former President of the European Parliament and former Progressive Democrats/Independent MEP. Early in June 2011, press reports indicated that Cox, who had stated his desire to stand as an independent candidate, was seeking to join Fine Gael to be eligible for the party's nomination. His application to join the party was accepted by Fine Gael's National Executive Committee on 14 June. He launched his campaign for the Fine Gael nomination on 17 June 2011, describing it as a "one-shot opportunity" and that if he failed to be nominated by the party he would not stand as an independent. Cox was claimed by the Irish Independent to be the preferred choice of Taoiseach Enda Kenny and the Fine Gael leadership.
- Avril Doyle, former MEP and TD. On 21 June 2011, she announced her candidacy. She withdrew from the contest on 7 July stating that she realised she was unlikely to receive the nomination.
- Mairead McGuinness, MEP for the East constituency, former presenter of Ear to the Ground on RTÉ One and former journalist with the Irish Independent. She announced her bid for the Fine Gael nomination in April 2011.

Voting was by secret ballot, with an electoral college consisting of the Fine Gael parliamentary party (TDs, Senators and MEPs) with 70% of the vote, county and city councillors (20%) and the twelve-member executive council (10%).

On the announcement that Mitchell had won the nomination, the Sunday Independent stated that party leader Enda Kenny was seen to slump and "could barely contain his disappointment". When questioned by a journalist on his apparent disappointment, Kenny responded sharply "Am I supposed to be going around grinning like a Cheshire Cat at everything?"

=== Labour Party ===
The Labour Party candidate was Michael D. Higgins. He was chosen jointly by the party's National Executive and the Labour Parliamentary Party at a special convention on 19 June 2011.

The former TD and minister originally indicated that he was interested in receiving the party's nomination in September 2010. Like Higgins, two other candidates put their names forward in late May 2011:

- Fergus Finlay, Chief Executive of Barnardo's children's charity, announced on 9 September 2010 that he would seek the Labour Party's nomination for president.
- Kathleen O'Meara, former Senator, also put her name forward for the party nomination.

=== Fianna Fáil ===
For the first time in any presidential election, Fianna Fáil neither ran a candidate nor supported the nomination of a candidate. The decision was made at a meeting of the parliamentary party on 31 August 2011, and was in line with the recommendations of the six-person subcommittee formed by the party leader Micheál Martin to consider the matter.

In June 2011 press reports had indicated that the party was unlikely to run a candidate both for financial reasons and also because it was unlikely that a Fianna Fáil nominee could be successful. In early August 2011 there was press speculation that RTÉ broadcaster Gay Byrne might seek a nomination. On 6 August Micheál Martin rang Byrne at his holiday home to indicate that Fianna Fáil Oireachtas members would facilitate his nomination. Byrne indicated that he had yet to make a decision on whether to put his name forward, but said that if he did so he would not run under the Fianna Fáil banner but as an independent, albeit with the assistance of the party's organisation. "Fianna Fáil are convinced no matter who they put up will be unelectable, so they're giving me their support" he told the Irish Independent. Éamon Ó Cuív, the party's deputy leader and member of the committee tasked with deciding on their strategy for the election stated that "I know of no approach to Gay Byrne... Nobody has discussed the issue with me — good, bad or indifferent." On 13 August Byrne informed Martin that he would not be going forward for nomination. He stated that the idea of running had been "foisted on him and he had not known anything about it and what it would involve". This followed unease among Fianna Fáil parliamentary party Oireachtas members, with a number unhappy that a candidate was being imposed by the leadership without discussion.

On 16 August 2011, the Irish Examiner reported that Micheál Martin had moved to pull the party out of the presidential race over the fallout from the approach to Gay Byrne, the cost involved and the slim chance of a candidate being elected. On 24 August, however, the party's deputy leader Éamon Ó Cuív told Raidió na Gaeltachta that he believed the party should put forward a candidate. Several members had expressed an interest in the party nomination:

- Brian Crowley, MEP, said in The Irish Times on 29 September 2008 that he would like to stand for president in 2011. In July 2011 he wrote to members of the parliamentary party confirming that he wished to contest the election as the Fianna Fáil candidate. On 23 August Crowley indicated that he would not be seeking a nomination. He stated that the party leadership "has demonstrated that it does not want an internal party candidate to contest the upcoming presidential election. So, with much disappointment, I do not now feel free to seek the Fianna Fáil nomination."
- Éamon Ó Cuív, TD for Galway West and former minister, expressed an interest in the office once held by his grandfather, Éamon de Valera.
- Senator Mary White had announced her intention to stand for the Fianna Fáil nomination in 2008, but in May 2011 said that she would not be seeking the nomination.
- Mary Hanafin also expressed an interest in seeking the nomination.

Following the decision by Fianna Fáil not to run their own candidate, there was speculation that some party members might be prepared to nominate an independent candidate. However, on 11 September the party's chief whip, Seán Ó Fearghail, made it clear that individual TDs and senators would not be permitted to sign the nomination papers of independent candidates. He said that if the party decided to support a candidacy it would be done collectively.

A meeting of the parliamentary party was held on 15 September at which the issue of the presidential election was raised. Unexpectedly, one of the party's senators, Labhrás Ó Murchú, sought nominations to run as an independent candidate. This was widely seen as a challenge to the authority of Micheál Martin. The extended meeting broke up without agreement. The parliamentary party met again on 20 September. Senator Ó Murchú withdrew his request for a nomination and a motion was passed that the party's Oireachtas members would not nominate or endorse any candidate. The decision was seen as a severe blow to the attempts to secure a nomination by David Norris and Dana Rosemary Scallon who were expected to need signatures from individual Fianna Fáil members.

=== Sinn Féin ===
At the party's Ard Comhairle meeting in Dublin in June 2011, the party's leader, Gerry Adams TD, ruled himself out as a candidate. He had previously expressed a wish to be elected president in time for the centenary of the Easter Rising in 2016.

There had been reports in July that artist Robert Ballagh was "seriously considering a run for the presidency", and had been in talks with Sinn Féin, the Socialist Party and People Before Profit Alliance. A Sinn Féin source confirmed there had been "very informal discussions", However, on 25 July Ballagh ruled himself out.

In a keynote speech at the party's Ard Fheis on 10 September Gerry Adams said that he felt that Sinn Féin should support the nomination of "a candidate who is capable of winning the support of progressive and nationalist opinion... who will reflect the broad republican spirit of the Irish people at this time". He went on to state that the party's Ard Comhairle would consider the matter on 17 September.

On 16 September it was revealed that the party would seek to have Martin McGuinness, deputy First Minister of Northern Ireland, nominated to contest the election. With 14 TDs and three senators, Sinn Féin were three short of the required twenty Oireachtas members to nominate a candidate for the presidency. Soon after the nomination was announced, four Independent TDs agreed to nominate McGuinness, securing his nomination: Michael Healy-Rae and Tom Fleming (both representing Kerry South), Luke 'Ming' Flanagan (Roscommon–South Leitrim) and Finian McGrath (Dublin North-Central). Both 'Ming' Flanagan and McGrath had previously pledged their support to Norris.

=== Independent ===
In order to secure a nomination, a number of non-party politicians sought the support of either 20 members of the Oireachtas or four city or county councils.

==== Oireachtas nominations ====
- David Norris, a Senator since 1987 and long time civil rights campaigner, credited with helping overthrow Ireland's laws criminalising homosexuality, launched his campaign in January 2011. It had initially been anticipated that he might be nominated by the Labour Party. A Red C poll commissioned by Paddy Power in January 2011 showed that Norris was by far the most popular choice for president with more than double the support of any of the other potential candidates. On 14 March 2011 Norris formally launched his campaign to secure a nomination, stating that he had written to the chairpersons of each of the 34 county and city councils and that he would also be individually contacting the independent TDs elected to the 31st Dail. On 21 July Norris revealed that he had secured the support of 13 Oireachtas members for his candidacy, and was confident of securing 20. On 22 July two more senators announced they would back him. However, on 2 August, Norris publicly announced at a press conference that he was withdrawing from the presidential race. This followed the decision of three of his backers, the TDs John Halligan, Finian McGrath and Thomas Pringle to withdraw their support following revelations that Norris had written a letter to a court asking clemency for his former partner Ezra Nawi, who was then on trial in Israel. This information was publicised on 24 July by John Connolly, a Zionist blogger in London, who claimed he had received a tip-off from an associate he admitted may have been a supporter of Norris's campaign rival and eventual election winner Michael D. Higgins. Norris withdrew his candidacy on 2 August due to the controversy. Nawi, a human rights campaigner and pacifist who has been jailed for several short spells for his activism, suggested at the time that his deeds were being "recycled" against him and those associated with him. However, by 15 September, media reports indicated Norris was seeking to re-enter the election, and was meeting independent TDs looking for their support. By 25 September, 18 members of the Oireachtas had signed Norris's nomination papers. Then Mattie McGrath TD indicated that he would not be signing Norris's nomination papers following a meeting with his supporters. This effectively ended the attempt to gain nomination through the Oireachtas, although Michael Lowry TD stated he would give the final required nomination if Norris acquired 19 nominations.
- Niall O'Dowd, New York based journalist and publisher. Early in June 2011, he indicated he had been approached by "a cross-party group of Irish and Irish-Americans" urging him to put his name forward for the contest. O'Dowd travelled to Ireland later in the month to meet Fianna Fáil, Sinn Féin and independent TDs and senators in an attempt to gain a nomination. O'Dowd withdrew from seeking a nomination on 30 June, due to the difficulty of organising a campaign and "because he stopped believing he could win".
- The members of the Technical Group of independents in Dáil Éireann considered nominating a candidate. Finian McGrath, the chair of the group, circulated a list of 10 possible candidates to the members during the summer of 2011. Although meetings were held with Dana Rosemary Scallon, Mary Davis and Trócaire chief executive Justin Kilcullen no agreement was reached. Kilcullen withdrew from seeking a nomination on 14 September.

==== Council nominations ====
A number of independent politicians sought support from local authorities, with four candidates nominated by the resolutions of four or more councils:

- Mary Davis announced on 26 May 2011 that she would be seeking a nomination. She had originally stated in August 2010 that she would consider standing for the presidency if approached by a political party. She subsequently decided to run as an independent, seeking nominations from four local authorities.
- Seán Gallagher. In May 2011, The Sunday Business Post reported that he was likely to seek a nomination. The Irish Times subsequently reported that in addition to seeking the support of independents, he was approaching Fianna Fáil Oireachtas members in order to run as an independent candidate, but with a "semi-detached" relationship with the party. On 13 June 2011, he began the process of looking for nominations from local authorities.
- David Norris. Norris approached a number of councils in June and July 2011. On 2 August Norris announced he was withdrawing from the election. In September he reversed the decision, and received his first local authority nomination on 20 September.
- Dana Rosemary Scallon announced on 19 September that she would be seeking a presidential nomination. She initially attempted to gain the signatures of 20 Oireachtas members. However, by 21 September, she only secured the support of one TD. She instead began the process of seeking support from county and city councils.

A number of councils scheduled special meetings to consider presidential nominations prior to the deadline of midday on 28 September 2011.

Name	Nominations	Councils
Mary Davis	13	Galway City, Galway County, Kerry, Limerick County, Louth, Mayo, Monaghan, North Tipperary, South Tipperary, Sligo, Waterford County, Wexford, Wicklow
Seán Gallagher	4	Cork City, Clare, Leitrim, Meath
David Norris	4	Fingal, Laois, Waterford City, Dublin City
Dana Rosemary Scallon	4	Carlow, Donegal, Offaly, Roscommon

== Candidates ==
Seven candidates contested the presidential election, having been selected by their parties or having received sufficient council nominations. This was the largest number of candidates to contest an Irish presidential election.

- Mary Davis, social entrepreneur, disability rights campaigner and best known as organiser of the 2003 Special Olympics World Summer Games in Ireland, was nominated by local councils.
- Seán Gallagher, entrepreneur, panellist on the Dragons' Den television programme and former member of the Fianna Fáil National Executive, was nominated by local councils.
- Michael D. Higgins, former Government Minister and TD was selected by the Labour Party.
- Martin McGuinness, deputy First Minister of Northern Ireland was selected by Sinn Féin, and received enough support from independent TDs to be nominated.
- Gay Mitchell, MEP and former TD was selected by Fine Gael.
- David Norris, Senator, scholar and civil rights campaigner, was nominated by local councils.
- Dana Rosemary Scallon, former MEP, was nominated by local councils.

== Election campaign ==
The "motley crew" of candidates (The Washington Times) led to much attention on the campaign and election outcome from the international media. The Guardian described it as "the most fractious presidential election campaign since the republic was founded".

Phil Hogan of Fine Gael, Minister for the Environment, Community and Local Government, attacked Martin McGuinness claiming that US multinational companies would be "appalled" if Martin McGuinness were elected and foreign direct investment would drop. This was followed by a tweet made by Government Chief Whip Paul Kehoe which claimed that McGuinness profited from the Northern Bank robbery. This was in response to a pledge made by McGuinness to only take the average industrial wage, if elected president. McGuinness dismissed both charges as "black propaganda". It was reported in The Irish Times that Fine Gael's "strategy of levelling strongly worded accusations at Mr McGuinness was part of a drive to motivate party voters to come out in support of Mr Mitchell in the October 27th election".

At her formal campaign launch on 4 October, Independent Mary Davis accused Fine Gael of using polling companies to research attacks on her. She also pledged she would ask the Government to bring the office of President under the terms of the Freedom of Information Act and that she would publish an annual expenditure report for the Áras. David Norris also made a pledge to publish expenses. Mrs. Davis eventually accepted "collective responsibility" for mortgage lending decisions made after she was appointed to the board of the ICS building society.

During the campaign, several relatives of people killed during The Troubles objected to the prospect of a former IRA member, McGuinness, becoming president. On 10 October, McGuinness was confronted in Athlone by the son of a member of the Irish Army killed by the IRA after Don Tidey's kidnap in Ballinamore in 1983. In a RTÉ interview that aired on 20 October, Bryan Dobson noted a 1985 Hot Press interview in which McGuinness indicated that he considered the IRA volunteers at Ballinamore to be "defending themselves against armed Gardaí and soldiers." When Dobson then asked if it was "fair to say that on this occasion you were standing over the killing of members of the Gardaí and Defence Forces?" McGuinness insisted that he has "never done that". The family of Garda Detective Frank Hand, killed in 1984, accused McGuinness of misleading younger generations with a "glossy campaign". The husband of a mother killed by the IRA in 1981 said he doubted McGuinness' claims of ignorance about the identities of IRA killers, saying "If anybody knows who did it, he does. If he is full of apologies he has never apologised to me".

In Northern Ireland, unionists took exception to the appearance of McGuinness election posters there given that Northern Ireland citizens were not eligible to vote in this election. Sinn Féin has regularly called for voting rights in the presidential election to be extended to Irish citizens in Northern Ireland.

Michael D. Higgins was confronted by former Tara mines workers while canvassing in Meath. The workers were upset about their pensions being cut.

=== Debates ===
The first broadcast debate of the campaign took place on 28 September 2011, the day that nominations closed, on RTÉ Radio 1's News at One programme. This was followed by a series of televised one-on-one interviews with the candidates on RTÉ One's evening Prime Time programme on the same day. A second debate was held on The Late Late Show on 30 September; David Norris was not interviewed alone as the other six candidates were as he had been interviewed the previous week on the programme, but was included in the later panel debate.

On 4 October, TV3 broadcast Vincent Browne's Big Presidential Debate. Gay Mitchell challenged Martin McGuinness on the "fairytale" that he left the IRA in 1974, asking him directly: "If you (McGuinness) say you left the IRA in 1974 and persist in saying that when you didn’t; if you say you are living on the average industrial wage when you are drawing down a couple of hundred grand – how can people have confidence in your word?" Moderator Vincent Browne later challenged Martin McGuinness' claims that he left the Provisional Irish Republican Army in 1974, producing eight books with alleged evidence claiming otherwise. McGuinness referenced this moment when he said in a later debate on the radio that people would blame him for the 1916 Rising if they could find a way to implicate him. Fine Gael candidate Gay Mitchell suffered heavily for his controversial views on suicide and on Ireland joining the Commonwealth. Labour candidate Michael D. Higgins was pursued by his past links to the unpopular Fianna Fáil and his admission that he had smoked cannabis.

During a debate on Today FM Gay Mitchell controversially spoke of Ireland rejoining the Commonwealth, with some other candidates disagreeing with him. Mitchell suffered from poor voter recognition, and was criticised over remarks on suicide he made on live radio.

On 12 October, Miriam O'Callaghan moderated a debate on RTÉ's Prime Time with the seven candidates. The debate, lasting 90 minutes, took place on a Wednesday night, though Prime Time usually aired on a Tuesday and Thursday, and was announced a week in advance. Dana Rosemary Scallon read out a prepared statement towards the end of the debate, announcing that a "malicious" and "false" accusation has been made against her and her family in the United States and, while refusing to divulge any details, she said she would leave "no stone unturned" in her mission to track down the person or organisation responsible. Scallon was visibly upset and was comforted by other candidates. She met with her lawyers the next day. David Norris expressed sorrow for Scallon and comforted her, also expressing frustration at the general tone of the election campaign and saying the media had libelled him in some of its reports. Scallon told TV3 News on 14 October that a freelance journalist had told her the allegations would appear through the media. Miriam O'Callaghan's treatment of Martin McGuinness resulted in more than 100 complaints to RTÉ. O'Callaghan's RTÉ colleague Pat Kenny said he watched on "with shock and horror because I don't think I've ever seen a politician ever interviewed on radio before and more or less called a murderer. That was kind of shocking." McGuinness himself also expressed disappointment with O'Callaghan.

Gallagher's campaign suffered a severe setback on 24 October when, in the last televised debate before the election, he admitted collecting a €5,000 cheque from someone he described as a "convicted criminal and fuel smuggler", for a Fianna Fáil fundraiser event which gave access to the Taoiseach, Brian Cowen after being questioned on the matter by Martin McGuinness. Gallagher had been the frontrunner in an opinion poll at this point. The donation was later revealed to be from businessman Hugh Morgan. Gallagher subsequently denied collecting a cheque from Morgan, but refused to answer questions on an illegal director's loan of €82,829, which had also been raised in the 24 October televised debate. After this performance Gallagher's campaign was compared to Devon Loch's fall at the winning post in the 1956 Grand National. He was reported to have been left "shell-shocked" afterwards. Gallagher cancelled his planned meet-the-people visits the following day so that he could tour broadcasters and attempt to explain his behaviour. On 7 March 2012, the Broadcasting Authority of Ireland (BAI) upheld a complaint against RTÉ relating to the broadcasting of the tweet that derailed Gallagher's presidential campaign.

Eventual winner Michael D. Higgins was pursued by his past links to the Fianna Fáil party, and admitted on 13 October that he had been elected chairman of the UCG Fianna Fáil university cumann in 1966. While at university in the United States he had, he admitted, smoked marijuana. However, media reports said he was "spared the intense grilling Miriam O'Callaghan meted out to some of the others" during the Prime Time debate.

List of debates
Date	Broadcaster	Moderator	Language
30 September 2011	RTÉ	Ryan Tubridy	English
4 October 2011	TV3	Vincent Browne	English
11 October 2011	Today FM	Matt Cooper	English
12 October 2011	RTÉ	Miriam O'Callaghan	English
18 October 2011	TG4	Páidí Ó Lionáird	Irish/English
22 October 2011	RTÉ Radio 1	Charlie Bird	English
24 October 2011	Newstalk	Ivan Yates	English
24 October 2011	RTÉ	Pat Kenny	English

=== Campaign spending ===
In February 2012 the Standards in Public Office Commission published the candidates' returns for campaign donations and election expenses. Candidates who receive more than 25% of a quota (i.e. 12.5% of the total votes; 221,471 votes) at any stage are entitled to a refund of election expenses to a maximum of €200,000. Three candidates received the maximum refund allowed; the other four had too few votes and received no refund. Only donations above €638 need be reported, making the reported totals less meaningful. Gay Mitchell had stated his campaign would be funded by a Fine Gael members' lottery.

Candidate	Agent	Reportable donations	Expenses	Reimbursement
Michael D. Higgins	Kevin O'Driscoll	€121,421.53	€359,935.48	€200,000
Sean Gallagher	Cathal Lee	€28,759.00	€323,318.45	€200,000
Martin McGuinness	Treasa Quinn	€4348.00	€302,563.47	€200,000
David Norris	Liam McCabe	€17,929.98	€331,974.89	Nil
Dana Rosemary Scallon	Brendan Kelly	€12,017.24	€59,591.47	Nil
Gay Mitchell	Tom Curran	Nil	€52,7152.01	Nil
Mary Davis	Ronan King	€120,095.00	€41,4041.32	Nil

== Opinion polls ==
Last date of polling	Commissioner	Polling firm	Source	Davis	Gallagher	Higgins	McGuinness	Mitchell	Norris	Scallon
23 October 2011	The Irish Times		Ipsos MRBI	3%	40%	25%	15%	6%	8%	3%
22 October 2011	The Sunday Business Post		Red C	2%	40%	26%	13%	6%	10%	3%
16 October 2011	The Sunday Business Post		RED C	4%	39%	27%	13%	8%	7%	2%
6 October 2011	The Irish Times		Ipsos MRBI	12%	20%	23%	19%	9%	11%	6%
6 October 2011	Paddy Power		RED C	9%	21%	25%	16%	10%	14%	5%
25 September 2011	The Sunday Business Post		RED C	13%	11%	18%	16%	13%	21%	6%

=== Polling before finalisation of candidates ===
Last date of polling	Commissioner	Polling firm	Ahern	Byrne	Crowley	Davis	Finlay	Gallagher	Higgins	McGuinness	Mitchell	Norris	Scallon
28 September 2011	Nomination period closes												
7 September 2011	Paddy Power	Red C	—N/a	—N/a	—N/a	19%	—N/a	21%	36%	—N/a	24%	—N/a	—N/a
13 August 2011	Gay Byrne declines to run												
10 August 2011	Paddy Power	Red C	—N/a	28%	13%	7%	—N/a	12%	21%	—N/a	13%	—N/a	6%
2 August 2011	David Norris withdraws												
6 January 2011	Paddy Power	Red C	12%	—N/a	10%	—N/a	10%	—N/a	11%	13%	—N/a	27%	—N/a

== Vote ==
Voting took place between 07:00 and 22:00 (IST) on 27 October.

As usual, voting began on certain offshore islands a few days before the rest of the country. On the Donegal islands of Arranmore, Gola, Inishfree, Inisbofin and Tory, voting took place on 24 October between 11:00 and 15:00 (11:00 and 19:30 on Arranmore). On 25 October, the Mayo islands of Clare Island, Inishbiggle and Inishturk went to the polls; while the Galway islands of Inishbofin and the Aran Islands voted on 26 October between 07:00 and 22:00.

After 15 hours of voting, ballot boxes were secured, with nationwide counting of votes beginning the following morning after presidential votes were separated from constitutional referendum votes (which were due to be counted later).

== Result ==
Counting of votes began at 09:00 on 28 October. The fourth and final count was completed by 15:56 on 29 October.

2011 Irish presidential election
Candidate	Nominated by	% 1st Pref	Count 1	Count 2	Count 3	Count 4
Michael D. Higgins	Oireachtas: Labour Party	39.6	701,101	730,480	793,128	1,007,104
Seán Gallagher	County and City Councils	28.5	504,964	529,401	548,373	628,114
Martin McGuinness	Oireachtas: Sinn Féin & Independents	13.7	243,030	252,611	265,196	
Gay Mitchell	Oireachtas: Fine Gael	6.4	113,321	127,357	136,309	
David Norris	County and City Councils	6.2	109,469	116,526		
Dana Rosemary Scallon	County and City Councils	2.9	51,220			
Mary Davis	County and City Councils	2.7	48,657			
Electorate: 3,191,157 Valid: 1,771,762 Spoilt: 18,676 (1.0%) Quota: 885,882 Turnout: 1,790,438 (56.1%)

First preference vote
Higgins	39.6%
Gallagher	28.5%
McGuinness	13.7%
Mitchell	6.4%
Norris	6.2%
Scallon	2.9%
Davis	2.7%

Final percentage
Higgins	56.8%
Gallagher	35.5%

== Results by constituency ==
=== First count ===
First preference votes by constituency
Constituency	Davis		Gallagher		Higgins		McGuinness		Mitchell		Norris		Scallon		Spoiled ballots (Note: The percentage of spoiled votes is out of all ballots cast, not the valid poll. Thus, the percentages sum to more than 100%.)		Turnout	
Constituency	Votes	%	Votes	%	Votes	%	Votes	%	Votes	%	Votes	%	Votes	%	Votes	%	Votes	%
Carlow–Kilkenny	1,143	1.9	19,846	33.8	21,574	36.7	7,257	12.4	4,511	7.7	2,792	4.8	1,614	2.7	591	1.0	59,328	55.6
Cavan–Monaghan	1,071	1.8	26,150	45.1	11,471	19.8	11,940	20.6	4,109	7.1	1,636	2.8	1,587	2.7	554	1.0	58,518	59.1
Clare	890	1.9	14,779	31.4	20,828	44.3	4,950	10.5	2,545	5.4	1,707	3.6	1,313	2.8	405	0.9	47,417	58.2
Cork East	923	3.0	15,455	34.4	16,435	36.6	6,193	13.8	2,678	6.0	1,921	4.3	1,348	2.1	509	1.1	45,462	55.0
Cork North-Central	693	1.7	11,526	28.1	15,427	37.6	8,201	20.0	1,911	4.7	2,090	5.1	1,178	2.9	576	1.4	41,602	55.0
Cork North-West	561	1.5	14,362	38.4	12,836	34.3	4,329	11.6	2,836	7.6	1,380	3.7	1,109	3.0	371	1.0	37,784	60.8
Cork South-Central	1,080	2.0	13,224	24.9	23,861	45.0	7,496	14.1	2,488	4.7	3,423	6.5	1,476	2.8	662	1.2	53,710	58.6
Cork South-West	770	2.2	12,449	35.0	12,047	33.9	4,608	13.0	3,035	8.5	1,534	4.3	1,128	3.2	370	1.0	35,941	59.7
Donegal North-East	598	2.1	7,978	28.2	6,516	23.1	9,085	32.2	1,384	4.9	788	2.8	1,905	6.7	328	1.2	28,582	48.8
Donegal South-West	660	2.1	9,912	32.3	7,093	23.1	8,738	28.4	1,620	5.3	916	3.0	1,777	5.8	352	1.1	31,068	48.4
Dublin Central	820	2.9	4,577	16.4	12,267	44.0	4,485	16.1	1,392	5.0	3,588	12.9	756	2.7	351	1.2	28,236	51.8
Dublin Mid-West	1,039	3.1	7,436	22.1	13,594	40.3	5,374	15.9	2,176	6.5	3,428	10.2	670	2.0	396	1.2	34,113	53.0
Dublin North	1,253	3.2	10,014	25.5	17,630	44.8	4,097	10.4	1,742	4.4	3,868	9.8	726	1.8	401	1.0	39,731	57.3
Dublin North-Central	1,148	2.5	6,603	20.1	15,230	46.4	3,678	11.2	1,953	5.9	3,434	10.5	812	3.5	381	1.2	33,239	64.0
Dublin North-East	1,491	4.4	7,138	21.0	14,956	43.9	4,484	13.2	1,727	5.1	3,512	10.3	754	2.2	400	1.2	34,462	59.8
Dublin North-West	1,491	3.7	7,138	20.3	14,956	38.8	4,484	19.9	1,727	4.4	3,512	10.6	754	2.3	358	1.4	25,361	59.8
Dublin South	915	3.3	5,069	20.0	9,709	51.1	4,985	6.5	1,111	7.3	2,638	9.8	576	2.0	514	0.8	64,492	50.3
Dublin South-Central	2,100	2.7	12,814	15.0	32,673	39.9	4,146	16.6	4,684	12.1	6,265	11.4	1,296	2.3	529	1.3	41,604	61.9
Dublin South-East	1,116	3.2	6,154	13.7	16,391	53.5	6,803	7.5	4,971	8.2	4,703	11.7	937	2.2	295	1.0	30,780	53.6
Dublin South-West	1,127	3.1	7,947	22.0	14,530	40.1	6,006	16.6	2,345	6.5	3,482	9.6	758	2.1	474	1.3	36,669	52.4
Dublin West	1,174	3.3	8,677	24.1	15,539	43.2	4,278	11.9	1,916	5.3	3,632	10.1	733	2.0	370	1.0	36,319	59.0
Dún Laoghaire	1,711	3.5	8,626	17.0	25,616	52.5	3,355	6.9	3,424	7.0	4,973	10.2	1,058	2.2	428	0.9	49,191	60.0
Galway East	1,053	2.3	13,473	28.9	21,554	46.2	4,849	10.4	2,905	6.2	1,177	2.5	1,670	3.6	411	0.9	47,092	57.5
Galway West	900	1.8	9,281	18.5	28,970	57.6	5,392	10.7	2,326	4.6	1,660	3.3	1,745	3.5	414	0.9	50,688	53.5
Kerry North–West Limerick	757	2.2	9,909	29.0	12,947	37.9	5,739	16.8	2,221	6.5	1,301	3.8	1,260	3.7	391	1.1	34,525	54.7
Kerry South	838	2.7	9,668	30.6	11,604	36.7	4,723	14.9	2,302	7.3	1,246	3.9	1,232	3.9	356	1.1	31,969	55.3
Kildare North	1,198	2.8	11,615	26.9	19,775	45.8	3,796	8.8	2,364	5.5	3,490	8.1	896	2.1	329	0.8	43,463	56.7
Kildare South	937	3.0	9,733	31.4	12,447	40.2	3,553	11.5	1,681	5.4	1,966	6.3	645	2.1	333	1.1	31,295	54.0
Laois–Offaly	1,181	2.0	22,115	31.8	18,686	37.6	7,663	13.0	3,891	6.6	3,547	6.0	1,765	3.0	517	0.9	59,365	55.5
Limerick	819	2.2	12,238	33.5	14,134	38.7	3,854	10.6	2,864	7.8	1,369	3.7	1,239	3.4	359	1.0	36,876	55.6
Limerick City	648	1.9	7,643	22.2	16,935	49.3	4,150	12.1	1,917	5.6	2,065	6.0	1,004	2.9	363	1.1	34,725	52.3
Longford–Westmeath	945	2.1	15,166	33.7	15,987	35.5	5,885	13.1	3,372	7.5	2,154	4.8	1,550	3.4	484	1.1	45,543	53.0
Louth	1,316	2.3	17,027	29.6	20,844	36.3	11,499	20.0	2,359	4.1	3,141	5.5	1,267	2.2	673	1.2	58,126	56.5
Mayo	4,981	9.4	13,370	25.2	20,329	38.3	6,300	11.9	4,878	9.2	1,483	2.8	1,719	3.2	567	1.1	53,627	54.9
Meath East	995	2.8	11,300	32.2	13,397	38.1	4,095	11.7	2,199	6.3	2,340	6.7	818	2.3	309	0.9	35,453	54.2
Meath West	831	2.5	10,972	33.5	11,280	34.4	4,865	14.9	1,982	6.1	1,928	5.9	889	2.7	324	1.0	33,071	52.4
Roscommon–South Leitrim	1,070	4.4	13,011	36.0	11,480	31.8	5,286	14.6	2,334	6.5	1,322	3.7	1,589	3.0	394	1.1	36,486	60.4
Sligo–North Leitrim	1,112	2.9	9,943	23.9	12,363	42.2	5,464	13.3	2,360	8.1	1,349	6.6	1,299	2.8	361	1.1	34,251	55.1
Tipperary North	890	2.3	13,491	35.6	13,197	34.8	4,459	11.8	3,121	8.2	1,385	3.7	1,399	3.7	439	1.1	38,381	61.3
Tipperary South	761	2.4	11,003	34.1	11,411	35.4	4,188	13.0	2,517	7.8	1,415	4.4	975	3.0	348	1.1	32,618	57.9
Waterford	918	2.2	13,107	31.0	16,340	38.7	5,737	13.6	2,489	5.9	2,451	5.8	1,218	2.9	471	1.1	42,731	54.1
Wexford	1,462	2.5	19,685	33.9	21,010	36.2	8,112	14.0	3,459	6.0	2,797	4.8	1,477	2.5	627	1.1	58,629	54.0
Wicklow	1,787	2.4	16,299	28.4	23,873	41.6	6,644	11.6	2,736	4.8	4,599	8.0	1,386	3.1	591	1.1	57,915	61.7
Total	48,657	2.7	504,964	28.5	701,101	39.6	243,030	13.7	113,321	6.4	109,469	6.2	51,220	2.9	18,676	1.0	1,790,438	56.1

== Reactions ==
Fine Gael General Secretary Tom Curran called it a "bad day" for the party, adding "From early on the electorate had the view that Gay (Mitchell) was out of the race and that it was a two person race". Mitchell received only about one in eight votes from his previous constituency of Dublin South-Central. Mitchell performed considerably worse than Fine Gael's 1990 candidate Austin Currie which was one of the party's most unsuccessful election campaigns. Gallagher's sudden demise was compared to Devon Loch's fall at the winning post in the 1956 Grand National. Speaking at the RDS count centre, David Norris conceded and sent Higgins his congratulations, calling him "a bit of a maverick like myself". Norris mentioned on radio that he had been "collecting apologies in the newspapers" and that they "told the truth in the end". Higgins received a hero's welcome at a victory reception on 30 October at Eyre Square, Galway; approximately 5,000 people turned out to welcome him home.
