= Devon Loch =

British-bred Thoroughbred racehorse

- Sire: Devonian
- Grandsire: Hyperion
- Dam: Coolaleen
- Damsire: Loch Lomond
- Sex: Gelding
- Foaled: 1946
- Country: United Kingdom
- Colour: Bay
- Owner: Queen Elizabeth the Queen Mother
- Last updated on 19 January 2008

Devon Loch (1946–1963) was a racehorse which fell on the final straight while leading the 1956 Grand National.

Owned by Queen Elizabeth the Queen Mother and ridden by Dick Francis, Devon Loch had won two races already that season and finished third in the National Hunt Handicap Chase at Cheltenham. His progress was helped when the favourite, Must, and a previous winner, Early Mist, fell early on.

He went to the front of the race with three jumps remaining, cleared the last half a length ahead of E.S.B., and took a commanding lead on the final stretch. Then, in front of the royal box just 40 yards from the winning post and five lengths ahead, he suddenly inexplicably jumped into the air and landed on his stomach, allowing E.S.B. to overtake and win. Although jockey Dick Francis tried to cajole the horse, it was unable to continue. Afterwards, the Queen Mother said: "Oh, that's racing."

It is not known why Devon Loch jumped; some reports claimed he suffered a cramp in his hindquarters causing the collapse. Another report asserted that a shadow thrown by the adjacent water-jump fence (which horses only traverse on the first circuit of the Aintree course) may have baffled Devon Loch into thinking a jump was required and – confused as to whether he should jump or not – he half-jumped and collapsed. Jockey Dick Francis later stated that a loud cheer from the crowd, for an expected royal winner, distracting the horse is a more likely explanation.

Reports that the horse had suffered a heart attack were dismissed, as Devon Loch recovered far too quickly for this to have been the case. He lived another six years, being put down during or shortly after the cold winter of 1962–3.

== Modern use ==
"To do a Devon Loch" is a modern metaphor now sometimes used in sports and otherwise to explain a sudden, last-minute failure of teams or a sportsperson to complete an expected victory, for example: "Manchester United won't do a Devon Loch and lose the title after beating Chelsea". Another example occurred ahead of the 2011 Irish presidential election when Seán Gallagher's campaign came undone in the final television debate, his fall from grace was compared to Devon Loch's fall just before the winning post in the 1956 Grand National.

In an article in The Times on 4 August 2012, Rick Broadbent wrote about the final day of the 2012 Olympics heptathlon competition: "Jessica Ennis is almost there. It would take a Devon Loch–style collapse to deny her the gold medal now." Referencing Leicester City F.C.'s position atop the Premier League table into the second half of the season, on 23 January 2016 Stuart James for The Guardian wrote, "Without wishing to put any extra pressure on Ranieri and his players, it is starting to look as though it would take a Devon Loch–style collapse for Leicester to miss out on a place in the top four." Conversely, after Liverpool F.C.'s 4–0 victory over Leicester in December 2019, extending their lead at the top of the table, Phil McNulty for the BBC wrote, "The Queen's famous horse Devon Loch, who inexplicably fell within sight of the winning line in the 1956 Grand National, would be wiped from the history books as the worst finisher if the Reds made a hash of this."
