= Gay Mitchell =

Irish former politician (born 1951)

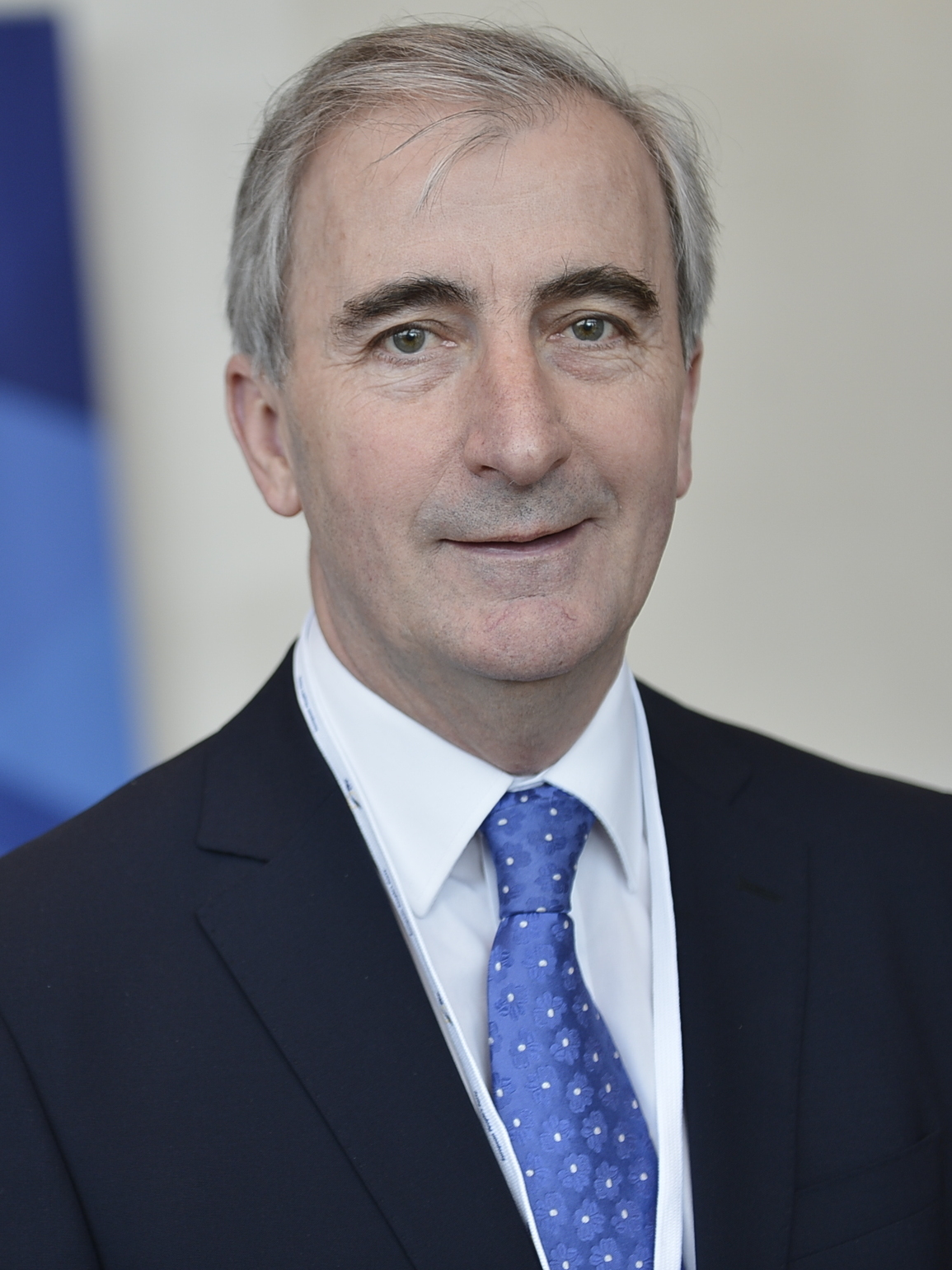
- Mitchell in 2014

Minister of State
- 1994–1997: European Affairs

Lord Mayor of Dublin
- In office June 1992 – June 1993
- Preceded by: Seán Kenny
- Succeeded by: Tomás Mac Giolla

Member of the European Parliament
- In office 1 July 2004 – 24 May 2014
- Constituency: Dublin

Teachta Dála
- In office June 1981 – May 2007
- Constituency: Dublin South-Central

Personal details
- Born: Gabriel Mitchell; 30 December 1951 (age 74) Inchicore, Dublin, Ireland
- Party: Fine Gael
- Spouse: Norma Mitchell (m. 1978)
- Children: 5
- Relatives: Jim Mitchell (brother)
- Education: Dublin Institute of Technology; Queen's University Belfast; University of Nottingham; The Priory Institute

Gabriel Mitchell (born 30 December 1951) is an Irish former Fine Gael politician who served as Minister of State for European Affairs from 1994 to 1997 and Lord Mayor of Dublin from 1992 to 1993. He served as a Member of the European Parliament (MEP) for the Dublin constituency from 2004 to 2014 and a Teachta Dála (TD) for the Dublin South-Central constituency from 1981 to 2007.

He was defeated by Enda Kenny in the 2002 Fine Gael leadership election. Mitchell was the Fine Gael candidate at the 2011 presidential election.

== Early life ==
Mitchell was born in Inchicore, Dublin, in 1951. His mother, Eileen, was left a widow with nine children whom she supported by working as an office cleaner. He was educated at St. Michael's Congregation of Christian Brothers, Emmet Road Vocational School, Dublin Institute of Technology, College of Commerce, Queen's University Belfast and the University of Northampton . Since leaving politics Mitchell gained a degree and masters from The Dominicsn Priory Institute. His brother, Jim Mitchell, was a long-serving Fine Gael TD and Minister.

His wife, Norma, conducted prominent charity work in her own right for Epilepsy Ireland, serving as a director of the board from 2011 to 2017 and serving on several committees.

== Political career ==
He first held political office in 1979 as a member of Dublin City Council. He was first elected to Dáil Éireann as a Fine Gael TD in the 1981 general election for the Dublin South-Central constituency. Since then he has served as a Minister of State at the Department of the Taoiseach and the Department of Foreign Affairs with special responsibility for European Affairs. He was the Irish Representative on the Reflection Group which prepared the Amsterdam Treaty.

Mitchell also served as Lord Mayor of Dublin from 1992 to 1993. While never holding full cabinet rank, has served on the opposition front bench as spokesperson for Health from 2000 to 2002, Foreign Affairs 1997 to 2000, Justice from 1993 to 1994, Public Service and Constitutional Reform from 1991 to 1992, Tourism and Transport from 1989 to 1991, European Integration from 1988 to 1989, Urban Renewal from 1987 to 1988 and Health Board Reform from 1981 to 1982.

Following Michael Noonan's resignation as Fine Gael leader in 2002, Mitchell was a challenger in the subsequent leadership election, losing out to the victor, Enda Kenny. Before his election to the European Parliament, he had been party Spokesperson for Foreign Affairs, writing the party's "Beyond Neutrality" policy document.

In November 2006, Mitchell announced that he had taken the difficult decision not to contest the 2007 general election and concentrate on his European Parliament seat. Mitchell was a Vice Chair of the ACP–EU Joint Parliamentary Assembly.

During the 2008 referendum on the Treaty of Lisbon, Mitchell was Fine Gael's director of elections for the referendum.

Mitchell is a former member of the European Parliament Committee on Development, the Special Committee on the Financial, Economic and Social Crisis and the delegation to the ACP–EU Joint Parliamentary Assembly. He was also a substitute member of the Committee on Economic and Monetary Affairs and the delegation for relations with the People's Republic of China.

Mitchell is the author of By Dáil Account, the first book published in Ireland on the history and role of the Public Accounts Committee (PAC) and the office of Comptroller and Auditor General. In September 2010, the Brussels-based Parliament Magazine named him "MEP of the Year" having previously nominated him for the award.

In June 2011, Mitchell refused to release details of his expense and allowance claims as a member of the European Parliament.

In March 2013, he said he would not stand at the 2014 European Parliament election.

=== 2011 presidential campaign ===
In 2011, Mitchell announced his intention to seek the Fine Gael nomination for the Irish presidential election. On 9 July 2011, he was chosen as the Fine Gael candidate at a special convention. He announced on The Late Late Show on 30 September 2011, that he expected his campaign for the presidency would cost €350,000. Mitchell's unsuccessful attempt to bring the Summer Olympic Games to Dublin was also discussed, with the former lord mayor saying he "set up 10 committees" in his attempt to make it happen.

Mitchell launched his presidential campaign with Taoiseach Enda Kenny on 3 October 2011. That same day he was involved in controversy when he made a joke about suicide on Newstalk's The Right Hook programme. He promised to "jump off O'Connell Bridge" if he was asked to smile. Founding Secretary of the Irish Association of Suicidology Dr John Connolly described Mitchell's comment as "unfortunate".

== Clemency pleas ==
Following the initial withdrawal of David Norris from the 2011 presidential campaign, after it was revealed that Norris had sought clemency for his former partner from a statutory rape conviction, it was subsequently pointed out that Mitchell had also sought clemency for a convict, in his case for Army of God member and double-murderer Paul Jennings Hill, a fact that had been public knowledge for eight years.

On 22 March 2002, Amina Lawal was sentenced to death by stoning for adultery and for conceiving a child out of wedlock, as chair of the Oireachtas European Affairs Committee, Mitchell met with the Nigerian ambassador to Ireland to protest the sentence at the time.

Another convict Mitchell sought clemency for was Louis Truesdale, who was convicted in 1980, of the rape and murder of 18-year-old Rebecca Ann Eudy. The victim's mother, Evelyn Eudy said that she "was appalled to hear Mr Mitchell was running as a presidential candidate in Ireland". According to newspaper reports when he was questioned about these letters on 27 August 2011, he "became quite incensed" and revealed that he has written "a number" of clemency pleas.

== Views on homosexuality ==
When asked for his views on same-sex marriage in a radio interview with Pat Kenny on 12 August 2011, Mitchell said he did not want to do anything that "weakens marriage" but that he had supported civil unions. In 2004, Mitchell defended Italian MEP Rocco Buttiglione's remarks when he referred to homosexuality as a sin.

Mitchell has been questioned as to whether or not he is a member of the European Catholic group Dignitatis Humanae Institute, which he denied on the same radio interview with Pat Kenny, However, according to Benjamin Harnwell, the institute's founding chairman Mitchell helped formulate the charter that became the institute's Universal Declaration of Human Dignity. In the same interview Mitchell was also asked whether or not he is a member of the Iona Institute (who reject the notion of same-sex marriages), which he also denied. However, in September 2007, he did host a conference (The Fragmenting Family) on behalf of the Iona Institute.

== In popular culture ==
Michael McDowell, contrasting Gay Mitchell to his brother Jim in a humorous wordplay on the principle of "the lesser of two evils", once jokingly referred to Gay as "the evil of two lessers".

== See also ==
- Families in the Oireachtas

Civic offices
Preceded by Seán Kenny	Lord Mayor of Dublin; 1992–1993	Succeeded by Tomás Mac Giolla
Political offices
Preceded by Tom Kitt	Minister of State for European Affairs; 1994–1997	Office abolished

Dáil	Election	Deputy (Party)	Deputy (Party)	Deputy (Party)	Deputy (Party)	Deputy (Party)
13th	1948	Seán Lemass (FF)	James Larkin Jnr (Lab)	Con Lehane (CnaP)	Maurice E. Dockrell (FG)	John McCann (FF)
14th	1951	Seán Lemass (FF)	James Larkin Jnr (Lab)	Philip Brady (FF)	Maurice E. Dockrell (FG)	John McCann (FF)
15th	1954	Seán Lemass (FF)	James Larkin Jnr (Lab)	Thomas Finlay (FG)	Maurice E. Dockrell (FG)	Celia Lynch (FF)
16th	1957	Seán Lemass (FF)	Jack Murphy (Ind.)	Philip Brady (FF)	Maurice E. Dockrell (FG)	Celia Lynch (FF)
16th	1958 by-election	Seán Lemass (FF)	Patrick Cummins (FF)	Philip Brady (FF)	Maurice E. Dockrell (FG)	Celia Lynch (FF)
17th	1961	Seán Lemass (FF)	Patrick Cummins (FF)	Philip Brady (FF)	Maurice E. Dockrell (FG)	Joseph Barron (CnaP)
18th	1965	Seán Lemass (FF)	Frank Cluskey (Lab)	Philip Brady (FF)	Maurice E. Dockrell (FG)	Thomas J. Fitzpatrick (FF)
19th	1969	Richie Ryan (FG)	Ben Briscoe (FF)	Philip Brady (FF)	John O'Donovan (Lab)	4 seats 1969–1977
20th	1973	Richie Ryan (FG)	Ben Briscoe (FF)	Philip Brady (FF)	John Kelly (FG)	4 seats 1969–1977
21st	1977	Fergus O'Brien (FG)	Frank Cluskey (Lab)	Thomas J. Fitzpatrick (FF)	3 seats 1977–1981	
22nd	1981	Fergus O'Brien (FG)	Ben Briscoe (FF)	Thomas J. Fitzpatrick (FF)	Gay Mitchell (FG)	John O'Connell (Note: O'Connell served as Ceann Comhairle in the 22nd and 23rd Dáil from 1981 to 1983 and was returned automatically at the February 1982 and November 1982 general elections. He joined Fianna Fáil in January 1985.) (Ind.)
23rd	1982 (Feb)	Frank Cluskey (Lab)	Ben Briscoe (FF)	Thomas J. Fitzpatrick (FF)	Gay Mitchell (FG)	John O'Connell (Ind.)
24th	1982 (Nov)	Frank Cluskey (Lab)	Ben Briscoe (FF)	Fergus O'Brien (FG)	Gay Mitchell (FG)	John O'Connell (Ind.)
25th	1987	Frank Cluskey (Lab)	Ben Briscoe (FF)	Fergus O'Brien (FG)	Gay Mitchell (FG)	Mary Mooney (FF)
26th	1989	John O'Connell (FF)	Ben Briscoe (FF)	Fergus O'Brien (FG)	Gay Mitchell (FG)	Eric Byrne (WP)
27th	1992	John O'Connell (FF)	Ben Briscoe (FF)	Pat Upton (Lab)	Gay Mitchell (FG)	4 seats 1992–2002
27th	1994 by-election	Eric Byrne (DL)	Ben Briscoe (FF)	Pat Upton (Lab)	Gay Mitchell (FG)	4 seats 1992–2002
28th	1997	Seán Ardagh (FF)	Ben Briscoe (FF)	Pat Upton (Lab)	Gay Mitchell (FG)	4 seats 1992–2002
28th	1999 by-election	Seán Ardagh (FF)	Ben Briscoe (FF)	Mary Upton (Lab)	Gay Mitchell (FG)	4 seats 1992–2002
29th	2002	Seán Ardagh (FF)	Aengus Ó Snodaigh (SF)	Mary Upton (Lab)	Gay Mitchell (FG)	Michael Mulcahy (FF)
30th	2007	Seán Ardagh (FF)	Aengus Ó Snodaigh (SF)	Mary Upton (Lab)	Catherine Byrne (FG)	Michael Mulcahy (FF)
31st	2011	Eric Byrne (Lab)	Aengus Ó Snodaigh (SF)	Joan Collins (PBP)	Catherine Byrne (FG)	Michael Conaghan (Lab)
32nd	2016	Bríd Smith (AAA–PBP)	Aengus Ó Snodaigh (SF)	Joan Collins (Note: Founded Right to Change in May 2020.) (I4C)	Catherine Byrne (FG)	4 seats from 2016
33rd	2020	Bríd Smith (S–PBP)	Aengus Ó Snodaigh (SF)	Joan Collins (I4C)	Patrick Costello (GP)	4 seats from 2016
34th	2024	Catherine Ardagh (FF)	Aengus Ó Snodaigh (SF)	Máire Devine (SF)	Jen Cummins (SD)	4 seats from 2016
