= 2002 Fine Gael leadership election =

Irish political party leadership contest

- 5 June 2002
Candidate
Percentage
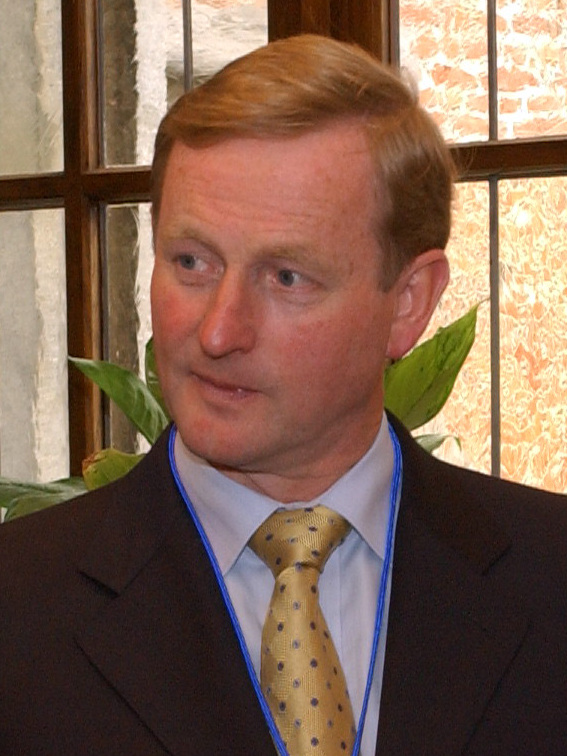
Enda Kenny
Majority
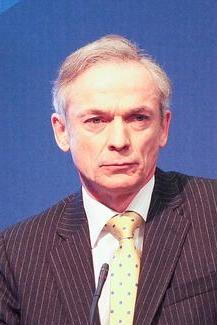
Richard Bruton
Candidate
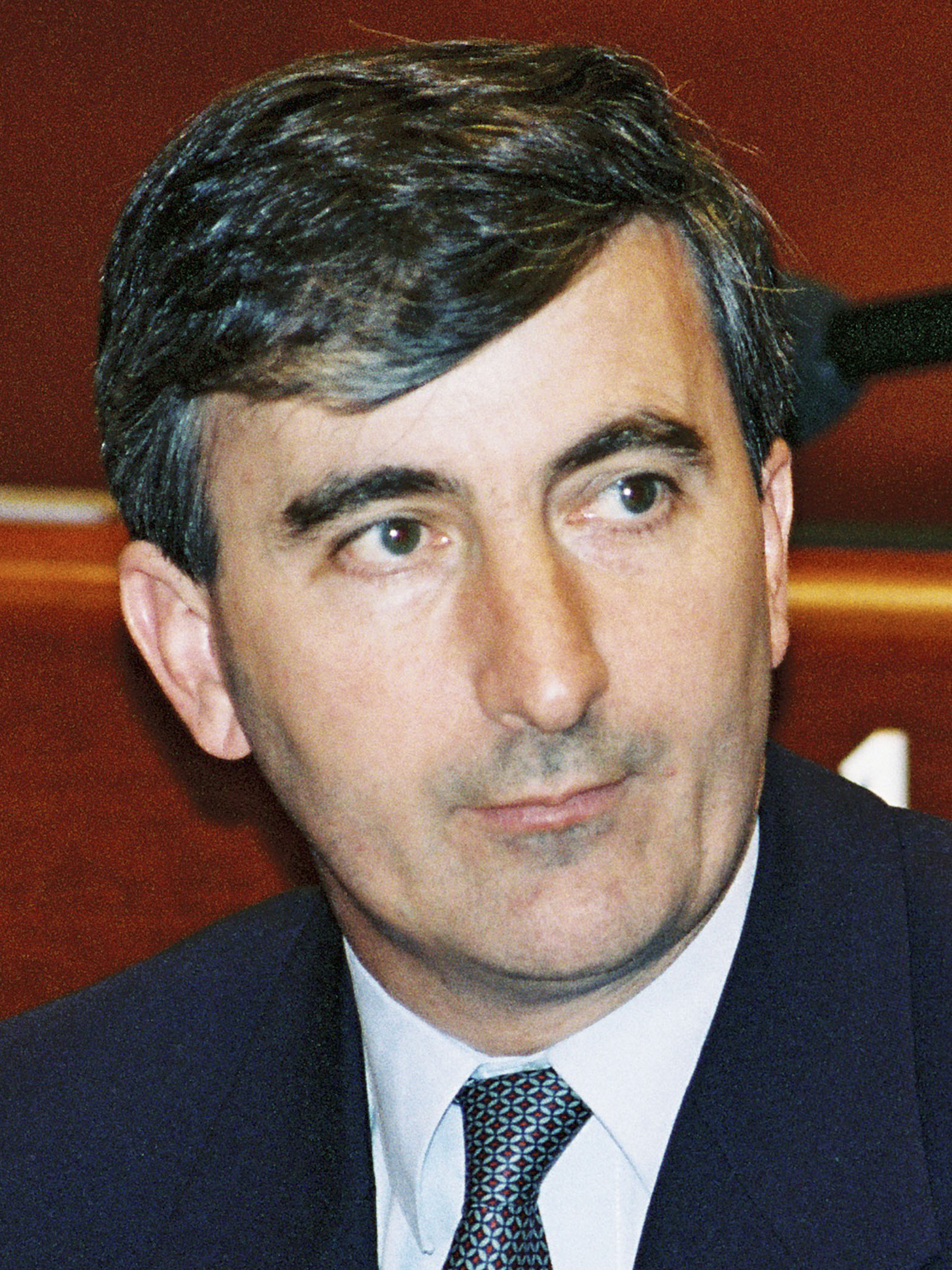
Gay Mitchell
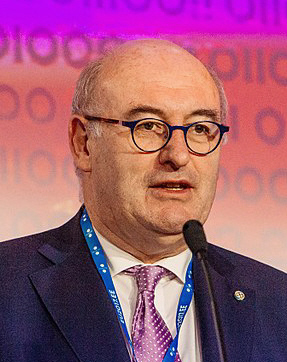
Phil Hogan
Leader before election
Michael Noonan
Elected Leader
Enda Kenny

The 2002 Fine Gael leadership election began in May 2002, when Michael Noonan resigned as party leader due to the party's poor performance in the 2002 general election. Noonan had only been party leader for little over fifteen months. His successor was elected by the members of the Fine Gael parliamentary party on 5 June 2002. After one ballot the election was won by Enda Kenny. Kenny defeated Richard Bruton, Gay Mitchell and Phil Hogan.

== Candidates ==
=== Standing ===
- Enda Kenny, TD for Mayo; former Minister for Tourism and Trade
- Richard Bruton, TD for Dublin North-Central; former Minister for Enterprise and Employment
- Gay Mitchell, TD for Dublin South-Central; former Minister of State for European Affairs
- Phil Hogan, TD for Carlow–Kilkenny; former Minister of State at the Department of Finance

=== Declined to stand ===
- Denis Naughten, TD for Roscommon–South Leitrim

== Result ==
49 members of the Fine Gael parliamentary party voted: 31 TDs, 14 Senators and 4 MEPs. The exact results were kept secret. Young Fine Gael delegates Lucinda Creighton and Leo Varadkar, later to become important figures in the party, criticised the procedure, writing "candidates for the Leadership are already sowing the seeds of Fine Gael's next election defeat by trading votes for votes with senators determined to make it back to Leinster House at any cost. The decision of the parliamentary party to decide the future of Fine Gael alone and behind closed doors is a disgrace and demonstrates their contempt both for the loyal Fine Gael membership and the 400,000 or so electors who voted for them. Shame on you all."
