= Mary Davis (activist) =

CEO of Special Olympics International

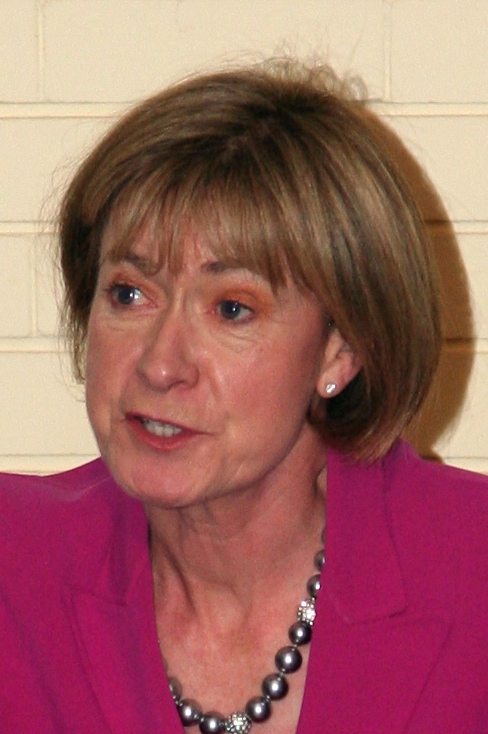

Chief Executive Officer of Special Olympics International
- Incumbent
- Assumed office 9 May 2016
- Preceded by: Timothy Shriver

Member of the Council of State
- In office 11 November 2004 – 10 November 2011
- Appointed by: Mary McAleese

Personal details
- Born: Mary Anne Rooney; 6 August 1954 (age 72) Swinford, County Mayo, Ireland
- Party: Independent
- Spouse: Julian Davis (m. 1988)
- Children: 4
- Education: Leeds Trinity University; University of Alberta
- Website: marydavis.ie

Mary Anne Davis (née Rooney; born 6 August 1954) is an Irish social entrepreneur, activist and long-term campaigner for the rights and inclusion of children and adults with intellectual disabilities. She has been the chief executive officer of Special Olympics International since May 2016. She previously was managing director and Regional President of Special Olympics Europe/Eurasia (SOEE), with the responsibility of overseeing the growth and development of Special Olympics across 58 countries in Western Europe, Eastern Europe and Central Asia. Davis also was Chairperson of Special Olympics Ireland.

She is well known for being CEO of 2003 Special Olympics World Summer Games held in Dublin, Ireland. This was the first time the event was staged outside of North America since Eunice Kennedy Shriver founded the movement in 1968 and the largest sporting event in the world that year. Davis was awarded a Person of the Year Award in 2003, for her work for this event as well as for her years of work with Special Olympics Ireland.

In November 2004, Davis was appointed by President Mary McAleese to serve on the Irish Council of State. In 2006, Davis was made chairperson of the newly created Taskforce on Active Citizenship. She also co-chairs the North South Consultative Conference for the Irish government.

Davis was a candidate in the 2011 Irish presidential election having received the required nominations from thirteen county councils. In a number of media columns and speeches, Davis expressed how as President of Ireland she could represent Ireland on an international stage, promote communities and community development, and support the values of fairness, equality and respect. She came last in the election receiving 48,657 (2.7%) first preference votes.

== Early life ==
Rooney grew up in Kinaffe, Midfield, which is halfway between Kiltimagh and Swinford, in County Mayo, she attended Kinaffe National School and St Louis Convent School, Kiltimagh. She has said that the seeds of her success were sown in her upbringing in East Mayo, saying "there was always a prevailing attitude of looking after your neighbour, of taking care of each other".

After finishing secondary school, Davis trained as a Physical Education teacher from Leeds Trinity University, United Kingdom, a women's teacher training college affiliated to the University of Leeds. From there she won a scholarship to the University of Alberta where she completed her academic studies. After returning to Ireland, she became PE co-ordinator with St Michael's House in Ballymun, Dublin, an organisation caring for people with intellectual disabilities. It was then that she first volunteered for Special Olympics Ireland.

== Special Olympics ==
In 1985, Davis worked as Events Director when the 1985 Special Olympics European Games were hosted in Dublin, Ireland. By 1989, she was appointed National Director of Special Olympics Ireland. She was a member of the SO International Sports Rules Committee (1986–1989), chairperson, SO European Development Committee (1982–1986) and chairperson, SO International Advisory Council (1993–1997). She was one of the main driving forces behind Ireland's bid to host the 2003 Special Olympics World Summer Games and her track record on national and international bodies was a major factor in bringing the Games to Ireland.

In May 2016, she was named chief executive officer. She is the first CEO from outside the U.S. in the organization's nearly 50-year history.

=== 2003 World Summer Games ===
Davis was CEO of the 2003 Special Olympics World Summer Games Organising Committee. This was the first time in 35 years that the World Summer Games were ever held outside of North America. The event involved participation by 165 countries, 32,000 volunteers and 10,000 athletes and coaches.

=== Global and European Leader ===
Davis was named acting CEO of Special Olympics International in October 2015 and then appointed full-time, permanent CEO in May 2016. Prior to this role, she was Regional President and managing director of Special Olympics Europe/Eurasia (SOEE), responsible for overseeing the growth and development of Special Olympics across 58 countries. The primary purpose for SOEE is to empower and enable these national programmes to make sports training and competitions opportunities available for people with intellectual disabilities as well as change attitudes, foster community building, provide healthcare and influence policy. In 2009, Davis secured €6 million in funding from the European Parliament. A further €447,000 was secured for SOEE's Youth Unified Sports programme.

== Irish politics ==
=== Council of State ===
Davis moved into the mainstream of Irish politics when she was appointed to the Irish Council of State by President Mary McAleese for her second term as President of Ireland, starting in 2004. Davis was one of seven personal appointees to the body established by the Constitution of Ireland to advise the President of Ireland in the exercise of her discretionary, reserve powers.

=== Task Force on Active Citizenship ===
In April 2006, Davis was appointed Chair of the Taskforce on Active Citizenship, due to her track record in "generating such a tremendous response from ordinary citizens to an extraordinary experience that was Special Olympics 2003. This is one example of the type of voluntary effort and community participation which sustains a healthy and vibrant society". More recently she was appointed Chair of the Steering Group on Active Citizenship to oversee the implementation of the recommendations of the taskforce.

=== North South Consultative Conference ===
Davis is also a co-chair of the North South Consultative Conference on behalf of the Irish government. The conference seeks to explore social, cultural and economic issues that have a North/South and cross-border dimension. The focus is on identifying potential for improved co-operation for mutual benefit.

=== Boards ===
Davis is one of the founder of Social Entrepreneurs Ireland. Previously Davis was on a number of boards including the Irish Sports Council, Broadcast Commission of Ireland, Dublin Airport Authority, UCD Foundation, The One Foundation, Boardmatch and chaired the St. Patrick's Festival for a four-year period. She was a member of the Advisory Group for the Ireland Funds. She also was on the co-ordinating committee of the 2003 European Year of People with Disabilities and is an Ambassador for the 2011 European Year of Volunteering. Davis is on many voluntary committees and is a member of the Irish Times Trust, the National Institute for Intellectual Disability, National Sports Campus Development Authority, and City of Science 2012 and acted as a judge for the O2 Ability Awards and the 'Your Country, Your Call' competition.

=== 2011 presidential campaign ===
Davis launched her presidential campaign on Tuesday, 4 October 2011, outlining what she will do in her first 100 days of office including asking the government to bring the office of president under the terms of the Freedom of Information Act and accusing Fine Gael of using polling companies to research attacks on her.

Davis had announced on 26 May 2011, that she would be seeking nomination for the 2011 Irish presidential election. She originally stated in August 2010, that she would consider standing for the presidency if approached by a political party.

Davis subsequently decided to run as an independent, seeking nominations from four local authorities. She began the process by addressing Galway County Council, Louth County Council and Clare County Council in June 2011. On 21 July 2011, she had received the support of six county councils (Kerry, Limerick, Louth, Mayo, Monaghan and Tipperary North) and was thus guaranteed a place on the ballot.

She announced on The Late Late Show that she expected her campaign for the presidency could cost €350,000 and confirmed on the same programme that businessman Denis O'Brien had provided money for her campaign subject to the law and the regulations of the Standards in Public Office (SIPO), which means that any one person or corporate entity can only donate a maximum of €2,539.

==== Quango payments controversy ====
After reports surfaced in the media that Davis was paid almost €190,000 by State quangos after being appointed to them by Fianna Fáil government ministers, she denied that she lacked the political independence she was claiming to have. On 4 October, Davis released details of her earnings from her position as managing director of Special Olympics Europe Eurasia, as well as income from her membership of three state and three commercial boards. She also posted her P60 on her website and called on other candidates to follow her lead. Mary Davis earned more than €60,000 in director fees in 2010 in addition to her salary of more than €150,000, according to figures on her income published on her website.

== Honours ==
=== Honorary doctorates ===
Davis has been awarded honorary Doctorates in Law by the University of Limerick, Dublin City University and the National University of Ireland. Davis also received an Honorary Fellowship of the faculty of Nursing & Midwifery at the Royal College of Surgeons in Ireland. On receiving the honorary degree from DCU, Davis said "I feel the award is an acknowledgement of what people did to make the Games so successful. It was a great honour to be CEO, but around me were all these people who were working with me to make it happen."

=== Distinctions ===
Over the years Davis has received many distinctions and achievements including Person of the Year (2003), Woman of the Year (2003), Marketer of the Year (2003), Mayo Person of the Year (2004), Woman of our Time Award – Social and Personal magazine (2003), Best of the Irish Award (2003), Business & Finance Person of the Month (July 2003), Irish Independent Person of the Month (June 2003), Public Relations Institute of Ireland Honour Award (2007), Public Relations Consultants Association 'Public Affairs Award for Ireland's Bid to host World Games' (1998), Lord Mayor of Dublin Millennium Award (1998), Irish Tatler – 100 Most Influential Women in Ireland (1998), and Irish Security Award for 'Caring' (1986).

Davis frequently is a guest speaker at conferences and special events around Ireland and is a regular contributor to Irish media outlets on a range of topics.

== Personal life ==
She is married to Julian Davis and they have four children – two daughters and two sons.

Davis ran the New York Marathon in November 2005, raising €80,000 for Special Olympics in the process. Before that, she achieved the ambition of a lifetime when she climbed Mount Kilimanjaro, with her husband Julian. She was invited to represent the Irish government on a climb of Mont Blanc on 1 July 2008 to celebrate the start of the EU Presidency in France.
