= Fred Pontin =

British entrepreneur (1906–2000)

Sir Fred Pontin
- Born: Frederick William Pontin; 24 October 1906; Highams Park, London, England
- Died: 30 September 2000 (aged 93); Blackpool, Lancashire, UK
- Education: Sir George Monoux Grammar School
- Known for: Founder, Pontins

Sir Frederick William Pontin (24 October 1906 – 30 September 2000) was the founder of Pontins holiday camps and one of the two main entrepreneurs in the British holiday camp business in the 30 years after World War II, alongside Billy Butlin.

He was born in Highams Park, the son of Frederick William Pontin, an East End cabinet maker, and Elizabeth Marian Tilyard, and attended Sir George Monoux Grammar School in Walthamstow but left without passing any examinations. He had a successful career in the city's Stock Exchange before World War II.

During the war, he was involved in helping to establish hostels for construction workers. Based on this experience, he decided to move into the holiday camp business after the war. In 1946, he formed a syndicate to buy an old disused camp at Brean Sands near Burnham-on-Sea, Somerset which was the beginnings of the company known as Pontins. He gradually expanded his business to encompass thirty sites including the popular Southport and Prestatyn resorts.

In 1960, he bought Farringford House on the Isle of Wight, the former home of Alfred, Lord Tennyson which had been turned into a hotel. Pontin kept racehorses in stables near the hotel, one of which, Specify, won the 1971 Grand National.

He expanded his holiday business into other parts of Europe, forming Pontinental in 1963 with holiday villages in Spain, Majorca, Sardinia, Ibiza, Greece, Morocco and Yugoslavia. In 1978, Pontins and Pontinental were sold to Coral for £56 million and he remained a director for two years, and continued to run hotels, including Farringford. In 1984, he acquired London Dungeon and opened York Dungeon in 1986.

He became Chief Barker of the Variety Club of Great Britain in 1968 and was president for 16 years, raising over £1 million. In the 1976 Queen's Birthday Honours List, he was knighted for his services to charity.

He married Dorothy, with whom he had a daughter, and subsequently married Joyce Hey in 1999, the year before he died in Blackpool, aged 93 on September 30, 2000.
