= 1971 Grand National =

English steeplechase horse race

- Grand National
- Location: Aintree
- Date: 3 April 1971
- Winning horse: (England) Specify
- Jockey: John Cook
- Trainer: (England) John Sutcliffe
- Owner: (England) Fred Pontin
- Conditions: Good

External videos
- The 1971 Grand National in full (BBC)
- Highlights of the 1971 Grand National, along with 1970 and 1972 BBC Sport

They're inside the final furlong now, Black Secret coming to challenge with Specify on the far side Sandy Sprite in between the two, it's Johnny Cook getting up on Specify... It's Specify and Black Secret, Specify is just gonna win it, at the line Specify is the winner!

— Commentator Peter O'Sullevan describes the climax of the 1971 National

The 1971 Grand National was the 125th renewal of the Grand National horse race that took place at Aintree near Liverpool, England, on 3 April 1971.

Gay Buccaneer was very unlucky having been the clear leader at the Canal turn on the first circuit, only to be interfered with by a loose horse which resulted in him going from first to last, and finishing tenth. Specify was the winner from a close finish between the leading five in the final furlong.

== Finishing order ==
Position	Name	Jockey	Age	Handicap (st-lb)	SP	Distance
01	Specify	John Cook	9	10-3	28/1	
02	Black Secret	Jim Dreaper	7	11-5	20/1	
03	Astbury	Jimmy Bourke	8	10-0	33/1	
04	Bowgeeno	Graham Thorner	11	10-5	66/1	
05	Sandy Sprite	Ron Barry	7	10-3	33/1	
06	Two Springs	Roy Edwards	9	11-4	13/1	
07	Vichysoise	Philip Blacker	9	10-3	100/1	
08	King Vulgan	John Crowley	10	11-0	16/1	
09	Regimental	John Lawrence	8	10-6	66/1	
10	Gay Buccaneer	Pat Black	10	10-0	66/1	
11	Final Move	Tommy Stack	11	10-0	66/1	
12	Limeburner (remounted)	John Buckingham	10	10-0	100/1	
13	Common Entrance (remounted)	Mouse Morris	10	10-0	100/1	Last to finish

== Non-finishers ==
Fence	Name	Jockey	Age	Handicap (st-lb)	Starting price	Fate
01	Brian's Best	Richard Evans	11	10-11	33/1	Brought Down
01	Country Wedding	Bob Champion	9	10-0	50/1	Brought Down
01	Craigbrook	Peter Ennis	12	10-1	80/1	Fell
01	Gay Trip	Terry Biddlecombe	9	12-0	8/1	Fell
01	Twigairy	Eddie Harty	8	10-6	25/1	Brought Down
03	The Laird	Jeff King	10	11-12	12/1	Fell
04	Battledore	John Enright	10	10-6	45/1	Refused
06	Copperless	Martin Gibson	10	10-1	100/1	Fell
06	Pride of Kentucky	Tony Mawson	9	10-0	50/1	Brought Down
06	Soldo	David Mould	10	10-7	66/1	Fell
08	Highworth	Dick Woodhouse	12	10-5	100/1	Pulled Up
08	Indamelia	Philip Hobbs	8	10-5	100/1	Fell
10	Cnoch Dubh	Tommy Carberry	8	10-11	20/1	Fell
10	The Otter	Buck Jones	10	10-1	12/1	Fell
10	Zara's Grove	Gordon Holmes	8	10-0	66/1	Fell
11	Lord Jim	Stan Mellor	10	10-9	9/1	Fell
12	Kellsboro' Wood	Andy Turnell	11	10-0	100/1	Fell
15	Miss Hunter	John Fowler	10	10-0	33/1	Fell
19	Smooth Dealer	Arthur Moore	9	10-3	33/1	Refused
19	Vulture	Sean Barker	9	10-0	16/1	Fell
22	Beau Bob	Richard Dennard	8	10-3	40/1	Unseated Rider
22	Money Boat	Bobby Coonan	7	10-7	16/1	Fell
27	Charter Flight	Bill Rees	9	11-8	25/1	Pulled Up
27	Flosuebarb	Joe Guest	11	10-1	33/1	Pulled Up
27	The Inventor	Brian Fletcher	10	10-7	20/1	Refused

== Media coverage ==
A special Grand National Grandstand was presented by David Coleman on the BBC for the twelfth year. Three commentators were used this year, Peter O'Sullevan, Raleigh Gilbert and Julian Wilson. Peter Bromley was the lead commentator on BBC radio.

== Aftermath ==
John Cook retired from racing the following year on medical advice and emigrated to Australia where he died after a long illness in 1999
