= Arthur Freeman (jockey) =

English jockey

Arthur Freeman (7 January 1926 - 1988) was an English jockey who is most well known for winning the 1958 Grand National riding Mr. What. He also won the 1958 King George VI Chase riding Lochroe, the 1960 Triumph Hurdle riding Turpial and the 1958 and 1959 Broadway Novices' Chase riding Just Awake and Mac Joy respectively. He was The Queen Mother's jockey. He rode M'as Tu Vu in the 1955 and 1956 Grant National but did not finish either. In 1960, he fell during a race at Plumpton and suffered a fractured skull. He was in a coma for three days and the injury ended his jockey career and so he became a trainer out of Newmarket. Freeman once owned future Grand National winner Specify. In his later years he suffered with depression, gambling and alcohol problems which contributed to the break up of his marriage, estrangement from his sons and bankruptcy. He died in 1988.

He is the father of Conservative MP George Freeman.

== Major wins ==
(United Kingdom) Great Britain

- Grand National - (1) Mr. What (1958)
- King George VI Chase - (1) Lochroe (1958)
- Triumph Hurdle - (1) Turpial (1960)
- Broadway Novices' Chase - (2) Just Awake (1958), Mac Joy (1959)
