= Oxo (horse) =

British Thoroughbred racehorse

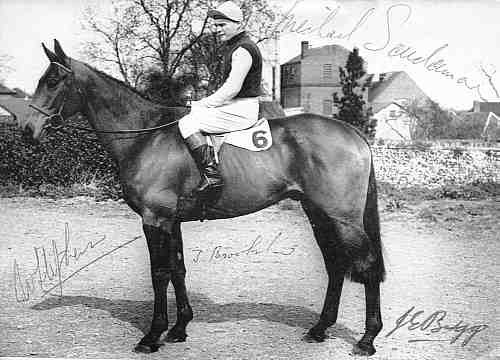
- Oxo, with the jockey Michael Scudamore
- Sire: Bobsleigh
- Grandsire: Gainsborough
- Dam: Patum
- Damsire: Portlaw
- Sex: gelding
- Foaled: 1951
- Country: United Kingdom
- Colour: Bay
- Breeder: A. C. Wyatt
- Owner: J. E. Biggs
- Trainer: Willie Stephenson

Major wins
- Grand National (1959)

Oxo was a British thoroughbred racehorse noted for winning the 1959 Grand National.

Oxo was a bay gelding bred in Dorset by A. C. Wyatt. An eight-year-old owned by Mr Jack Biggs and trained by Willie Stephenson in Royston, Hertfordshire, Oxo was ridden in the National by Michael Scudamore. Starting as the second favourite at 8/1, Oxo fought it out for the lead with Wyndburgh, only winning after fighting all the way to the finish, by a length and a half.
