= Stan Hayhurst =

English footballer (1925–1998)

Personal information
- Full name: Stanley Henry Hayhurst
- Date of birth: 13 May 1925
- Place of birth: Leyland, Lancashire, England
- Date of death: 1998 (aged 72–73)
- Position: Goalkeeper

Senior career*
Years	Team	Apps	(Gls)
1942–1943	Leyland Motors		
1943–1948	Blackburn Rovers	27	(0)
1948–1950	Tottenham Hotspur	0	(0)
1950–1951	Barrow	26	(0)
1951–1953	Grimsby Town	62	(0)
1953–195?	Weymouth		
- * Club domestic league appearances and goals

Stanley Henry Hayhurst (13 May 1925 – 1998) was an English professional footballer who played as a goalkeeper.
