= Mr. What =

Irish bred Thoroughbred racehorse

- Sire: Grand Inquisitor
- Grandsire: His Reverence
- Dam: Duchess of Pedulas
- Damsire: Duke of Buckingham
- Sex: Gelding
- Foaled: 1950
- Country: Ireland
- Colour: Bay
- Owner: David J. Coughlan
- Trainer: Tom Taaffe, Sr.

Major wins
- Grand National (1958)

Mr. What was an Irish bred, Irish-trained Thoroughbred racehorse noted for winning the 1958 Grand National.

An eight-year-old gelding owned by David Coughlan, trained by Tom Taaffe. Mr. What was ridden by The Queen Mother's jockey Arthur Freeman who put up 6 lb (2.7 kg) overweight. Appearing ideally suited by the heavy conditions, the horse won by 30 lengths, despite stumbling at the last fence. Mr. What finished third in both the 1959 and the 1962 runnings of the National, but never won another race.
