= E.S.B. (horse) =

Irish-bred Thoroughbred racehorse

- Sire: Bidar
- Grandsire: Blenheim
- Dam: English Summer
- Damsire: Blue Ensign
- Sex: Gelding
- Foaled: 1946
- Country: Ireland
- Colour: Dark bay or brown
- Breeder: Sheila Bourke
- Owner: Mrs Leonard Carver
- Trainer: Fred Rimell
- Record: 92:24-?-?

Major wins
- Grand National (1956)

E.S.B. was an Irish-bred, British-trained Thoroughbred racehorse which won the 1956 Grand National.

E.S.B. was a dark bay gelding bred in County Kildare by Sheila Bourke. Trained by Fred Rimell, E.S.B. was ridden by jockey Dave Dick in the 1956 running of the steeplechase at Aintree Racecourse. He started at odds of 100/7 in a field of twenty-nine runners. The race seemed certain to be won by Devon Loch, who held a five-length lead on the run-in. However, forty yards from the finishing post, Devon Loch suddenly, and inexplicably, half-jumped into the air and collapsed in a bellyflop on the turf. E.S.B. overtook and sealed an unlikely victory, completing the course in 9 minutes 21.4 seconds, one second off the record completion time.

E.S.B.'s win was the first of four for trainer Rimell, who went on to train winners Nicolaus Silver (1961), Gay Trip (1970) and Rag Trade (1976).
