= Eddie Dempsey (jockey) =

Irish jockey

Eddie Dempsey (1911 - 7 February 1989) was an Irish National Hunt racing jockey, during the 1930s and 1940s.

Born in County Meath in 1911, he rode Caughoo to victory in the 1947 Grand National, and Prince Regent in the Enniskerry Hurdle in 1941.

In the 1947 Grand National, the jockey in second place (Daniel McCann) accused him of cheating by taking a shortcut in the fog, leading to the pair exchanging blows before the matter was settled in court.

He retired at the end of the 1950 season and lived in Donaghmore House in County Meath.
