= Arthur Thompson (jockey) =

Irish jockey

Arthur Patrick Thompson (1916–1988) was an Irish National Hunt racing jockey, during the 1930s, 1940s and 1950s notable for riding the winner of the Grand National twice. Firstly with Sheila's Cottage in 1948 and then with Teal in 1952

Thompson was born in Carlow, Ireland in 1916. During World War II, he joined the Northumberland Fusiliers and became a "Desert Rat," serving in the Middle East and North Africa. Unfortunately, he was later captured and spent three years as a POW in Germany..

Following his retirement from racing in 1956, Thompson became a trainer, continuing to make a significant contribution to the sport. He remained active in horse racing until May 1988 when he died in Wexford.
