= Dave Dick (jockey) =

British jockey

David Victor Dick (8 March 1924 – 15 February 2001) was a British jockey who competed at the Grand National from 1951 to 1965, winning the race in 1956 on E.S.B. He was the only jockey ever to win both races of the Lincoln-Grand National Spring Double and he holds the record, nine times, for the number of clear rounds on a notoriously difficult Aintree course. (The Aintree Clear Rounds Award, given for any jockey completing more than five clear rounds, was not instituted until 1986.)

Dick was born in Ashampstead, Berkshire, the son of Glasgow-born jockey and racehorse trainer David Purvis Dick (1896-1989) and his wife Alice Isabel Ivall. He died in Reading, aged 76.

In 1969, Dick married Caroline Lockhart, with whom he had one son and one daughter, the Olympic bronze medalist, Daisy Dick.
