= Michael Scudamore =

English jockey (1932-2014)

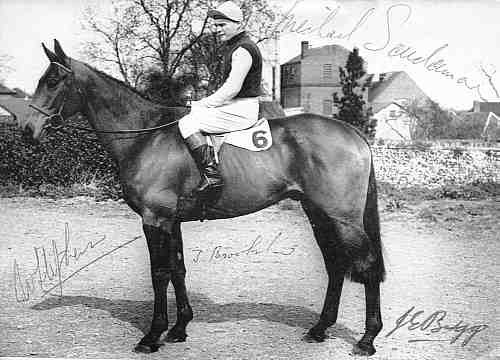
- Scudamore on Oxo in 1959

Personal information
- Nationality: English
- Born: 17 July 1932
- Died: 7 July 2014 (aged 81)
- Children: Peter Scudamore

Horse racing career
- Sport: Horse racing

Major racing wins
- 1956 King George VI Chase; 1957 Cheltenham Gold Cup; 1959 Grand National

Significant horses
- Rose Park; Linwell; Oxo

Michael Scudamore (17 July 1932 – 7 July 2014) was an English National Hunt racing jockey in the 1950s and 1960s. He rode in 16 consecutive Grand Nationals, with one win on Oxo in 1959. He also rode Linwell, the winner of the 1957 Gold Cup.

His riding career ended in 1966, due to serious injuries from a fall on a chance ride on Snakestone at Wolverhampton where he sustained multiple fractures, a collapsed lung and over 90% vision loss in one eye. Scudamore then continued as a trainer.

He was the father of Peter Scudamore and the grandfather of Tom Scudamore.
