= Waley =

Waley (/ˈweɪli/ WAY-lee) is a surname. Notable people with this name include:

- Alison Waley (1901–2001), New Zealand poet, journalist, artist and writer
- Arthur Waley (born Arthur David Schloss; 1889–1966), English orientalist and sinologist
- Daniel Waley (1921–2017), British historian, manuscript specialist, and professor
- Harmon Metz Waley (1910–1984), American criminal convicted for his role in the George Weyerhaeuser kidnapping
- Jacob Waley (1818–1873), English legal writer, grandfather of Charles Waley Cohen, Dorothea Waley Singer, and Robert Waley Cohen
- Jim Waley (born 1948), Australian television presenter
- Paul Waley, British academic, great-nephew of Arthur Waley
- Robert Waley (1889–1939), Australian coxswain
- Samuel Waley (born 1983), Tasmanian-born Australian rower
- Simon Waley (1827–1875), English composer, banker, and leading figure in the Jewish community, younger brother of Jacob Waley

== Variants ==
=== Waley Cohen ===
- Charles Waley Cohen (1879–1963), British soldier, barrister, and politician, brother of Dorothea Waley Singer
- Dorothea Waley Singer (née Cohen; 1882–1964), British palaeographer and historian of science, sister of Robert Waley Cohen
- Robert Waley Cohen (1877–1952), British industrialist and prominent Jewish leader, father of Bernard Waley-Cohen

=== Waley-Cohen ===
- Freya Waley-Cohen (born 1989), British-American composer
- Joanna Waley-Cohen (born 1952), English academic
- Robert Waley-Cohen (born 1948), English entrepreneur, father of Sam Waley-Cohen
- Sam Waley-Cohen (born 1982), English jockey and entrepreneur
- Waley-Cohen baronets, a title in the Baronetage of the United Kingdom
  - Bernard Waley-Cohen (1914–1991), 1st Baronet, father of Stephen Waley-Cohen, Robert Waley-Cohen, and Joanna Waley-Cohen
  - Stephen Waley-Cohen (born 1946), 2nd Baronet, theatre manager and producer, father of Freya Waley-Cohen

=== Waleys ===
- Thomas Waleys (fl. 1333), English theologian

== Other uses ==
- "DJ Waley Babu", a 2015 Punjabi-Hindi hip-hop single
- Mehndi Waley Hath, a 2000 Punjabi Pakistani film

== See also ==
- Whaley (surname)
