= Levy Barent Cohen =

English financier (1747–1808)

- Born: 1747
- Died: 1808 (aged 60–61)
- Occupation: Financier
- Spouse: Lydia Diamantschleifer
- Parent: Barent Cohen
- Relatives: Shlomo David Cohen-Chazzan (brother); Nanette Salomons Cohen (niece); Nathan Mayer Rothschild (son-in-law); Moses Montefiore (son-in-law)

Levy Barent Cohen (1747 – 1808) was a Dutch-born British financier and community worker.

== Early life ==
Levy Barent Cohen was born in Amsterdam in 1747. He was the son of Barent Cohen, a wealthy merchant. Cohen was of Ashkenazi Jewish descent.

== Career ==
Cohen and his brother moved to England where they developed a large business in London. He became known as one of the leading merchants of the city.

== Personal life ==
Cohen was naturalized as a British subject in 1798. He was closely involved in a number of Jewish charities and filled successively all the offices of the Duke's Place Synagogue, the principal Ashkenazi synagogue in London.

He married twice, first to Fanny (née Diamantschleifer) then, after her death, to Fanny's sister, Lydia. He had eight surviving children. Through the marriages his children contracted, including with Nathan Mayer Rothschild and Sir Moses Montefiore, nearly all the leading Jewish families in England were connected with him. In addition, his brother's daughter was Nanette Salomons Cohen, the maternal grandmother of both Karl Marx and Frederik Philips who – with his son Gerard – founded Philips Electronics.

Partial list of descendants
- Levy Barent Cohen (1747–1808)
  - Joseph Cohen (1774–1838)
    - Louis Cohen (1799–1882)
      - Adelaide Cohen (1830–1895), married Sir Joseph Sebag-Montefiore
      - Lionel Louis Cohen (1832–1887)
      - Ellen Cohen (1843–1919), married Samuel Montagu, 1st Baron Swaythling
      - Sir Benjamin Cohen, 1st Baronet (1844–1909)
        - Sir Herbert Benjamin Cohen, 2nd Baronet (1874–1968)
      - Nathaniel Louis Cohen (1846–1913), married Julia Matilda Waley, daughter of Jacob Waley
        - Sir Robert Waley Cohen (1877–1952)
          - Sir Bernard Waley-Cohen, 1st Baronet (1914–1991)
            - Rosalind Waley-Cohen (born 1945), married Philip Burdon
            - Sir Stephen Waley-Cohen, 2nd Baronet (born 1946)
              - Jack Waley-Cohen (born 1979)
            - Robert Waley-Cohen (born 1948)
              - Sam Waley-Cohen (born 1982)
            - Joanna Waley-Cohen (born 1952)
        - Charles Waley Cohen (1879–1963)
  - Esther Cohen (1782–1859), married Samuel Moses Samuel
    - Amelia Samuel (c. 1812–1890), married firstly Denis Moses, Baron de Samuel and secondly George FitzMaurice, 6th Earl of Orkney
      - Louisa de Samuel, married George de Worms, 2nd Baron de Worms
  - Hannah Cohen (1783–1850), married Nathan Mayer Rothschild
    - Rothschild banking family of England
  - Judith Cohen (1784–1862), married Sir Moses Montefiore
  - Benjamin Cohen (1789–1867), married Justina Montefiore, sister of Sir Moses Montefiore
    - Arthur Cohen (1830–1914)
      - Sir Benjamin Arthur Cohen (1862–1942)
      - Margaret Cohen (1864–1931), married Sir Theodore Morison
  - Isaac Cohen (1791–1846)
    - Juliana Cohen (1831–1877), married Mayer Amschel de Rothschild
  - Jessie Cohen (1795–1869), married Myer Davidson
  - Adeline Cohen (1799–1877), married John Helbert

== Death ==
Cohen died in England in 1808.
