= Whalers =

Whalers may refer to:

== Geography ==
- Whalers Bluff Lighthouse, Victoria, Australia

== Sports ==
- Danbury Whalers, US ice-hockey team in the Federal Hockey League
- Hartford Whalers, former US ice-hockey team
- New Bedford Whalers, name of three US soccer teams
- Plymouth Whalers, US ice-hockey team in the Ontario Hockey League
- Sag Harbor Whalers, US collegiate summer baseball team

== Entertainment ==
- Whalers (film), a 1939 Swedish film

== See also ==
- Category:People in whaling, people in the whaling industry
- Whaler (disambiguation)
- Whaling
- The Wailers (disambiguation)
