= Robert Waley-Cohen =

English entrepreneur

- Born: Robert Bernard Waley-Cohen; 10 November 1948 (age 78); Westminster, United Kingdom
- Education: Eton College
- Occupation: Businessman
- Title: Founder and CEO of Alliance Imaging Inc; Founder and CEO of Alliance Medical; Founder and Director of Portman Healthcare
- Board member of: The Jockey Club until 2019; Brown Advisory
- Spouse: The Honourable Felicity Ann Samuel (m. 1975)
- Children: 4, including Sam
- Parents: Bernard Waley-Cohen (father); Joyce Waley-Cohen (mother)

Robert Bernard Waley-Cohen DL (born 10 November 1948) is an English entrepreneur.

== Personal life ==
He is the son of Bernard Waley-Cohen and Joyce Waley-Cohen, and grandson of Sir Robert Waley Cohen and Harry Nathan, 1st Baron Nathan. He was educated at Eton College.

In 1975, Waley-Cohen married The Honourable Felicity Ann Samuel, daughter of Marcus Samuel, 3rd Viscount Bearsted. The couple have four children, Marcus, Jessica, Sam and Thomas. Thomas died in 2004 from cancer.

He has three siblings. His brother is Sir Stephen Waley-Cohen a senior figure in the world of theatre, and operator of St Martin's Theatre home of The Mousetrap. He has two sisters, Rosalind, who is married to the former New Zealand politician Philip Burdon and Joanna a professor at New York University. His nephew, Jack, is the question editor for BBC tv quiz Only Connect and founder of What3words.

In 2009, his net worth was estimated at £30 million by the Sunday Times Rich List. Waley-Cohen was appointed as a Deputy Lieutenant of the County of Warwickshire on 16 August 2016.

== Business ==
Waley-Cohen started his career in 1969 with Christie's auction house, where he remained until 1981. He has founded multiple companies including a founding shareholder and director of Portman Healthcare, a dental business, founder and CEO of Alliance Medical and later founder and CEO of Alliance Imaging Inc in California. Waley-Cohen is on the board of American investment company Brown Advisory.

== Horse racing ==
Waley-Cohen is a noted horse racing owner and breeder. He was chairman of Cheltenham Racecourse until October 2019, succeeded by Martin St Quinton. He has experienced multiple successes with big race victories including the 2011 Cheltenham Gold Cup with Long Run, and the 2022 Grand National with Noble Yeats ridden by his son, Sam Waley-Cohen.
