= 2022 Grand National =

174th Grand National horse race

- Grand National
- Location: Aintree
- Date: 9 April 2022
- Winning horse: (Republic of Ireland) Noble Yeats
- Starting price: 50/1
- Jockey: (England) Sam Waley-Cohen
- Trainer: (Republic of Ireland) Emmet Mullins
- Owner: (England) Robert Waley-Cohen
- Conditions: Good to soft

External videos
- Full replay of the 2022 Grand National Racing TV, YouTube

The 2022 Grand National (officially known as the 2022 Randox Grand National for sponsorship reasons) was the 174th annual running of the Grand National horse race. It took place on Saturday, 9 April 2022, at Aintree Racecourse in Liverpool, England. The event was sponsored by Randox Health.

The race was won by Noble Yeats, trained by Emmet Mullins and ridden by Sam Waley-Cohen, with final odds at 50/1. Waley-Cohen became the first amateur jockey to win the Grand National since Marcus Armytage on Mr Frisk in 1990, while Noble Yeats became the first seven year old to win the race since Bogskar in 1940. The race was Waley-Cohen's last race before retirement.

== Race card ==
The 40 runners were finalised at 1pm on Friday 8 April. Three horses declared to run at Thursday's 48-hour declaration stage (Easysland, Lord Du Mesnil and Phoenix Way) were withdrawn before the Friday confirmation, with reserves Commodore, Romain De Seman and School Boy Hours taking their places and racecard numbers. Horses trained in Ireland made up 21 of the 40 runners, the first time more than half the Grand National field were Irish-trained.

No	Horse	Age	Handicap (st–lb)	SP	Jockey	Trainer
1	Minella Times	9	11-10	9/1	Rachael Blackmore	Henry de Bromhead
2	Delta Work	9	11-9	11/1	Jack Kennedy	Gordon Elliott
3	School Boy Hours	9	10-5	33/1	Sean Flanagan	Noel Meade
4	Any Second Now	10	11-8	15/2 F	Mark Walsh	Ted Walsh
5	Run Wild Fred	8	11-7	11/1	Davy Russell	Gordon Elliott
6	Lostintranslation	10	11-6	50/1	Harry Cobden	Colin Tizzard
7	Brahma Bull	10	11-6	80/1	Brian Hayes	Willie Mullins
8	Burrows Saint	9	11-5	33/1	Paul Townend	Willie Mullins
9	Mount Ida	8	11-5	66/1	Denis O'Regan	Gordon Elliott
10	Longhouse Poet	8	11-4	12/1	Darragh O'Keefe	Martin Brassil
11	Fiddlerontheroof	8	11-3	12/1	Brendan Powell	Colin Tizzard
12	Two for Gold	9	11-3	33/1	David Bass	Kim Bailey
13	Santini	10	11-1	33/1	Nick Scholfield	Polly Gundry
14	Samcro	10	11-1	80/1	Sean Bowen	Gordon Elliott
15	Escaria Ten	8	11-1	25/1	Adrian Heskin	Gordon Elliott
16	Good Boy Bobby	9	10-13	22/1	Daryl Jacob	Nigel Twiston-Davies
17	Romain De Senam	10	10-5	100/1	Philip Armson	David Pipe
18	Coko Beach	7	10-13	50/1	Jonjo O'Neill jr	Gordon Elliott
19	De Rasher Counter	10	10-12	66/1	Adam Wedge	Emma Lavelle
20	Kildisart	10	10-11	50/1	James Bowen	Ben Pauling
21	Discorama*	10	10-11	33/1	Bryan Cooper	Paul Nolan
22	Top Ville Ben	10	10-11	80/1	Thomas Dowson	Philip Kirby
23	Enjoy D'allen	8	10-11	18/1	Conor Orr	Ciaran Murphy
24	Anibale Fly	12	10-11	80/1	Luke Dempsey	Tony Martin
25	Dingo Dollar	10	10-11	28/1	Ryan Mania	Sandy Thomson
26	Freewheelin Dylan	10	10-10	40/1	Ricky Doyle	Dermot A McLoughlin
27	Class Conti	10	10-10	100/1	Sam Twiston-Davies	Willie Mullins
28	Noble Yeats	7	10-10	50/1	Sam Waley-Cohen	Emmet Mullins
29	Mighty Thunder	9	10-10	40/1	Derek Fox	Lucinda Russell
30	Cloth Cap	10	10-10	33/1	Tom Scudamore	Jonjo O’Neill
31	Snow Leopardess	10	10-9	10/1	Aidan Coleman	Charlie Longsdon
32	Agusta Gold	9	10-9	66/1	Danny Mullins	Willie Mullins
33	Commodore	9	10-5	33/1	Charlie Deutsch	Venetia Williams
34	Deise Aba	9	10-8	80/1	Tom O'Brien	Philip Hobbs
35	Blaklion	13	10-8	50/1	Harry Skelton	Dan Skelton
36	Poker Party	10	10-8	66/1	Robbie Power	Henry de Bromhead
37	Death Duty	11	10-7	33/1	Jordan Gainford	Gordon Elliott
38	Domaine De L'Isle	9	10-7	125/1	Harry Bannister	Sean Curran
39	Eclair Surf*	8	10-6	14/1	Tom Bellamy	Emma Lavelle
40	Fortescue	8	10-6	28/1	Hugh Nugent	Henry Daly

- Died due to injuries sustained during the race.

== Finishing order ==
Placed horses

1: Noble Yeats

2: Any Second Now

3: Delta Work

4: Santini

Position	Name	Age	Handicap (st–lb)	SP	Distance	Jockey	Trainer	Prize money
1	Noble Yeats	7	10–10	50/1		Sam Waley-Cohen	Emmet Mullins	£561,300
2	Any Second Now	10	11–8	15/2 F	2 1/4 lengths	Mark Walsh	Ted Walsh	£211,100
3	Delta Work	9	11–9	10/1	20 lengths	Jack Kennedy	Gordon Elliott	£100,000
4	Santini	10	11–2	33/1	1 1/4 lengths	Nick Scholfield	Polly Gundry	£65,000
5	Fiddlerontheroof	8	11–4	12/1	8 lengths	Brendan Powell	Colin Tizzard	£40,000
6	Longhouse Poet	8	11–4	12/1	2 1/4 lengths	Darragh O'Keefe	Martin Brassil	£30,000
7	Freewheelin Dylan	10	10–10	50/1	19 lengths	Ricky Doyle	Dermot A McLoughlin	£20,000
8	Coko Beach	7	10–13	50/1	13 lengths	Jonjo O'Neill jr	Gordon Elliott	£15,000
9	Escaria Ten	8	11–1	25/1	9 1/2 lengths	Adrian Heskin	Gordon Elliott	£10,000
10	Romain De Senam	10	10–5	125/1	18 lengths	Philip Armson	David Pipe	£5,000
11	Samcro	10	11–1	80/1	8 1/2 lengths	Sean Bowen	Gordon Elliott	
12	Commodore	10	10–5	33/1	18 lengths	Charlie Deutsch	Venetia Williams	
13	Class Conti	10	10–10	100/1	12 lengths	Sam Twiston-Davies	Willie Mullins	
14	Blaklion	13	10–8	50/1	33 lengths	Harry Skelton	Dan Skelton	
15	Lostintranslation	10	11–6	50/1	99 lengths	Harry Cobden	Colin Tizzard	

== Non-finishers ==
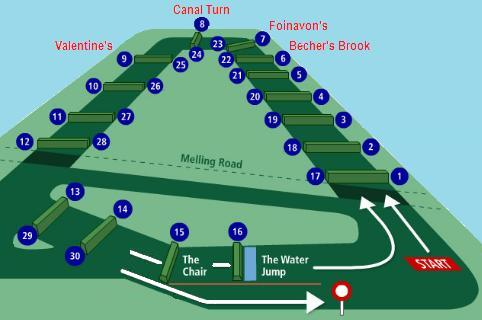
Overview of the 4½-mile National Course at Aintree with thirty fences.

Fence	Name	Jockey	SP	Fate
1	Enjoy D'allen	Conor Orr	18/1	Unseated rider
1	Mount Ida	Denis O'Regan	66/1	Unseated rider
3	Anibale Fly	Luke Dempsey	80/1	Brought down
3	Eclair Surf	Tom Bellamy	14/1	Fell
8 (Canal Turn)	De Rasher Counter	Adam Wedge	66/1	Unseated rider
8 (Canal Turn)	Death Duty	Jordan Gainford	33/1	Fell
8 (Canal Turn)	Run Wild Fred	Davy Russell	11/1	Fell
9 (Valentine's Brook)	School Boy Hours	Sean Flanagan	33/1	Pulled up
9 (Valentine's Brook)	Minella Times	Rachael Blackmore	9/1	Fell
9 (Valentine's Brook)	Agusta Gold	Danny Mullins	66/1	Fell
9 (Valentine's Brook)	Deise Aba	Tom O'Brien	80/1	Pulled up
13	Discorama	Bryan Cooper	33/1	Pulled up
15 (The Chair)	Domaine De L'Isle	Harry Bannister	125/1	Unseated rider
15 (The Chair)	Burrows Saint	Paul Townend	33/1	Unseated rider
15 (The Chair)	Kildisart	James Bowen	50/1	Fell
17	Snow Leopardess	Aidan Coleman	10/1	Pulled up
22 (Becher's Brook)	Cloth Cap	Tom Scudamore	33/1	Pulled up
24 (Canal Turn)	Dingo Dollar	Ryan Mania	28/1	Unseated rider
25 (Valentine's Brook)	Mighty Thunder	Derek Fox	40/1	Pulled up
27	Fortescue	Hugh Nugent	28/1	Unseated rider
27	Poker Party	Robbie Power	66/1	Unseated rider
27	Brahma Bull	Brian Hayes	80/1	Pulled up
27	Good Boy Bobby	Daryl Jacob	22/1	Pulled up
28	Top Ville Ben	Thomas Dowson	80/1	Pulled up
28	Two For Gold	David Bass	33/1	Pulled up

Only 29 fences were jumped; what would normally have been fence 19 was bypassed, as medical staff were tending to a horse that had fallen on the first circuit.

== Broadcasting and media ==
"Any Second Now and Noble Yeats land over the last in the National. Noble Yeats on the far side for Sam Waley-Cohen, Any Second Now for Mark Walsh. The two of them race towards the elbow., Delta Work and Santini for the places. As they race inside the final 150 yards, Noble Yeats, Sam Waley-Cohen on his last ride, trying to repel Any Second Now, and he eked out a length advantage! Noble Yeats on the run to the line for the Waley-Cohen's, Any Second Now, Delta Work and Santini, but up towards the line. What a way to go out! Sam Waley-Cohen and Noble Yeats for Emmet Mullins won the National!"

— ITV lead commentator Richard Hoiles describes the climax of the race.

As the Grand National is accorded the status of an event of national interest in the United Kingdom and is listed on the Ofcom Code on Sports and Other Listed and Designated Events, it must be shown on free-to-air terrestrial television in the UK. The race was broadcast live on TV by ITV for the fifth time, and the second year in its current three year deal with the British Horseracing Authority.

The ITV coverage was presented by Ed Chamberlin and Francesca Cumani. Analysis was provided by former Grand National-winning jockeys Sir Anthony McCoy, Mick Fitzgerald and Ruby Walsh. Reports were provided by Alice Plunkett, Luke Harvey and Matt Chapman, and betting updates were provided by Brian Gleeson. Oli Bell and Chris Hughes covered viewers' comments on social media. The commentary team was Mark Johnson, Ian Bartlett and Richard Hoiles, who called the finish for the fifth time. Following the race, Bell and Walsh guided viewers on a fence-by-fence re-run of the race.

== Equine fatalities ==
Discorama and Eclair Surf were euthanised following injuries sustained in the race. Discorama was euthanised after being pulled up with an injury before the 13th fence; the horse was reported as lame and on Saturday evening trainer Paul Nolan confirmed the horse had been euthanised. Eclair Surf suffered a "traumatic head injury" after falling at the third fence; it was treated on track and at Liverpool University before dying the following morning.

Two other horses had died earlier at the meeting. Solwara One, who ran in the 1.45pm race on 8 April, was the first to be put down following an injury before Elle Est Belle suffered a suspected heart attack, when finishing fourth in the Betway Mersey Novices' Hurdle on 9 April, before the main race.
