= Simon Waley =

English musician (1827–1875)

- Grave of Simon Waley in Balls Pond Road Cemetery

Background information
- Born: 23 August 1827; Stockwell, London
- Died: 30 December 1875 (aged 48) Marylebone, London
- Genre: Classical
- Occupations: Composer, pianist
- Instrument: Piano
- Works: L'arpeggio (1848)

Simon Waley Waley (23 August 1827 – 30 December 1875) was a classical pianist and one of the leading members of Anglo-Jewry in the 19th century.

== Biography ==
Waley was born in Stockwell, London. He was a leading broker on the London Stock Exchange and a prominent amateur musician. He was a leading figure in the Jewish community during the period of the emancipation of the Jews from civil disabilities.

He contributed many letters to The Times under the signature W. London. His letters on A tour in Auvergne, published in the Daily News in 1858, were incorporated into John Murray's Handbook for Travellers in France.

Waley was a highly gifted musician. He began to compose as a child. His first published work, L'arpeggio (for piano), was published in 1848. He had piano lessons from Ignaz Moscheles, William Sterndale Bennett and George Alexander Osborne, and lessons in theory and composition from William Horsley and Bernhard Molique. As well as being a brilliant pianist (he performed regularly at concerts of the Amateur Musical Society conducted by Henry Leslie), Waley was a prolific composer. His published compositions include a piano concerto (op. 16), two piano trios (in B flat and G minor, op. 15 and op. 20), marches and caprices for piano, and many songs, including "Angels' voices" and "Sing on, sing on, ye little birds". He also wrote orchestral pieces, which were not published. One of his finest works is a setting of Psalms 117 and 118 for the synagogue service.

He died at home in Marylebone, London, in 1875 and is buried at Balls Pond Road Cemetery.

== Family ==
Waley was the son of Solomon Jacob Waley, a slaveholder and co-owner of the Quintynes plantation in Saint John, Barbados. In 1829, he bought out his partner Isaac Levi and held ownership of 100 slaves. He received an award under the Slave Compensation Act 1837. Waley's younger brother was Jacob Waley, while other members of the same family were Arthur Waley, Sir Robert Waley Cohen and Sir Bernard Waley-Cohen.

== Sources ==
- "Waley, Simon Waley". Oxford Dictionary of National Biography (online ed.). Oxford University Press. doi:10.1093/ref:odnb/28459. (Subscription, Wikipedia Library access or UK public library membership required.). The first edition of this text is available at Wikisource: "Waley, Simon Waley" . Dictionary of National Biography. London: Smith, Elder & Co. 1885–1900.
- Grove Dictionary of Music and Musicians
