= 2011 Cheltenham Gold Cup =

The 2011 Cheltenham Gold Cup was a horse race which took place at Cheltenham on Friday March 18, 2011. It was the 83rd running of the Cheltenham Gold Cup, and it was won by the pre-race favourite Long Run who beat three previous winners of the Gold Cup in Kauto Star, Denman and defending champion Imperial Commander. Long Run was ridden by Mr Sam Waley-Cohen and trained by Nicky Henderson. Waley-Cohen became the first amateur jockey to win the Cheltenham Gold Cup since Jim Wilson on Little Owl in 1981 while Long Run was the first six-year-old to win the race since Mill House in 1963.

== Race details ==
- Sponsor: Totesport
- Winner's prize money: £285,050.00
- Going: Good
- Number of runners: 13
- Winner's time: 6m 29.70s

== Full result ==
	*	Horse	Age	Jockey	Trainer ^{†}	SP
1		Long Run	6	Mr Sam Waley-Cohen	Nicky Henderson	7/2 fav
2	7	Denman	11	Sam Thomas	Paul Nicholls	8/1
3	4	Kauto Star	11	Ruby Walsh	Paul Nicholls	5/1
4	nse	What A Friend	8	Daryl Jacob	Paul Nicholls	25/1
5	8	Midnight Chase	9	Tom Scudamore	Neil Mulholland	9/1
6	3¾	Tidal Bay	10	Brian Hughes	Howard Johnson	16/1
7	shd	Pandorama	8	Paul Carberry	Noel Meade (IRE)	14/1
8	3½	Neptune Collonges	10	Robert Thornton	Paul Nicholls	33/1
9	34	Carruthers	8	Mattie Batchelor	Mark Bradstock	66/1
PU	Fence 21	Imperial Commander	10	Paddy Brennan	Nigel Twiston-Davies	4/1
PU	Fence 20	China Rock	8	Barry Geraghty	Mouse Morris (IRE)	25/1
PU	Fence 18	Kempes	8	Tony McCoy	Willie Mullins (IRE)	9/1
PU	Fence 14	Weird Al	8	Jason Maguire	Ian Williams	20/1

- Amateur jockeys indicated by "Mr".

* The distances between the horses are shown in lengths or shorter. shd = short-head; nse = nose; PU = pulled up.
† Trainers are based in Great Britain unless indicated.

== Winner's details ==
Further details of the winner, Long Run:

- Foaled: April 5, 2005 in France
- Sire: Cadoudal; Dam: Libertina (Balsamo)
- Owner: Robert Waley-Cohen
- Breeder: Mrs Marie-Christine Gabeur
