= Fluorodeoxysorbitol =

- Structural formula of [18F]-fluorodeoxysorbitol

Identifiers
- IUPAC name: (2R,3R,4S,5S)-5-Fluorohexane-1,2,3,4,6-pentol
- CAS Number: 34339-80-5 [18F]: 1582302-46-2
- PubChem CID: 21126041
- ChemSpider: 19993475

Chemical and physical data
- Formula: C_{6}H_{13}FO_{5}
- Molar mass: 184.163 g·mol^{−1}
- 3D model (JSmol): Interactive image
- SMILES: C([C@H]([C@H]([C@@H]([C@H](CO)F)O)O)O)O
- InChI: InChI=1S/C6H13FO5/c7-3(1-8)5(11)6(12)4(10)2-9/h3-6,8-12H,1-2H2/t3-,4+,5+,6+/m0/s1; Key:FHMVCKHFSUAUMP-SLPGGIOYSA-N

[18F]-Fluorodeoxysorbitol (commonly called ^{18}F-FDS) is a radiolabeled analog of the sugar alcohol sorbitol, in which a fluorine-18 (^{18}F) radionuclide replaces the hydrogen at the 2-position. It is used as a radiotracer in positron emission tomography (PET) for imaging certain microbial infections and renal function.

== Synthesis ==
Chemically, ^{18}F-FDS is 2-deoxy-2-[^{18}F]-fluoro-D-sorbitol, a sorbitol analog modified by substitution of the 2-position hydrogen with radioactive fluorine-18. This modification preserves the structure sufficiently to be recognized and taken up by certain microbes that naturally metabolize sorbitol.

One of the key advantages of fluorodeoxysorbitol is its relatively easy synthesis. It can be produced via a simple one-step reduction from [^{18}F]-fluorodeoxyglucose, which is widely available in radiochemistry facilities. This provides easier production at facilities with PET-imaging capability.
