= Eleanor Nathan =

British politician

Eleanor Joan Nathan, Lady Nathan (1892–1972) was a British politician and member of the London County Council (LCC) from 1928 to 1934 for the Liberal Party and from 1937 to 1948 for the Labour Party, serving the last year as the council's chair. Her husband was Harry Nathan, 1st Baron Nathan, who was MP for Wandsworth Central.

== Personal life and family ==
Nathan was born as the daughter of Carl Stettauer in 1892 and was educated at Queen's College, London and Girton College, Cambridge. She took an honours degree in economics and mathematics and was a governor of the college.

In 1919, she married Harry Nathan. They had two children, Roger Nathan (1922–2007) and Joyce Constance Ina Waley-Cohen (1920–2013), later the wife of London Lord Mayor Bernard Waley-Cohen. Nathan, as well as her father and husband, were British Jews and their views guided her career, although she herself was not known to be particularly interested in defending Jewish interests. She was the president of the Union of Jewish Women for 12 years. She died in 1972, aged 79, in her London home.

== Political career ==
A well-known communal worker and expert in housing and juvenile delinquency, Nathan was first elected to the London County Council (LCC) for Bethnal Green North East as a Liberal Party candidate in 1928, receiving almost twice as many votes as any Labour candidate. In 1931, she was reelected to the same seat.

After losing to a Labour candidate in 1934, both she and her husband switched parties and joined the Labour Party. In 1937, Nathan returned to the council as a member for Wandsworth Central and served until 1948. In 1947, she became the first woman to become chairman of the council, and the second, after Eveline Lowe, to chair sessions of the council. She was a member of the education committees of the LCC and the Inner London Education Authority from 1939 to 1967 as well as a justice of the peace from 1928 and member of the Juvenile Court Panel.

Civic offices
Preceded by John Cliff	Chairman of the London County Council; 1947–1948	Succeeded by Walter Richard Owen
