= Whaler (disambiguation) =

A whaler is a specialized kind of ship designed for whaling.

Whaler may also refer to:

== Music ==
- "The Whaler", a song on the 2007 album The Alchemy Index Vols. I & II by the band Thrice
- Whaler (album), a 1994 album by Sophie B. Hawkins

== Sharks ==
- Bronze whaler, a large shark
- Creek whaler, a requiem shark

== Vessels ==
- Boston Whaler, a brand of motorboat
- Montagu whaler, a boat used in some navies
- Hartford Whalers, a former hockey team

== Other uses ==
- Whaler, predecessor to the BK Big Fish, a sandwich at the restaurant chain Burger King
- Whaler (surname), people with this name

== See also ==
- Category:People in whaling
- Waler, an Australian breed of horse
- Whalers (disambiguation)
- Whaleboat, the small craft from which the whales were harpooned
