= Joyce Waley-Cohen =

English educationist and public servant

The Honourable Lady Waley-Cohen JP
- Born: Joyce Constance Ina Nathan; 20 January 1920; Kensington, London, England
- Died: 30 June 2013 (aged 93); Simonsbath, Somerset, England
- Education: Saint Felix School
- Alma mater: Girton College, Cambridge
- Occupations: Educationalist; Public servant
- Spouse: Sir Bernard Waley-Cohen, 1st Baronet (m. 1943; died 1991)
- Children: Sir Stephen Waley-Cohen, 2nd Baronet; Joanna Waley-Cohen; Robert Waley-Cohen
- Parent(s): Harry Nathan, 1st Baron Nathan; Eleanor Stettauer

Joyce Constance Ina Waley-Cohen, Lady Waley-Cohen JP (née Nathan; 20 January 1920 – 30 June 2013) was an English educationist and public servant. She was chair of the Saint Felix School's governing body, the Governing Bodies of Girls' Schools Association, the Independent Schools Joint Council, Taunton School and Wellington College, chair of the board of both the Westminster Children's Hospital and the Gordon Hospital. Waley-Cohen was married to Sir Bernard Nathaniel Waley-Cohen, 1st Baronet, the Lord Mayor of London, and they had four children.

== Background ==
Waley-Cohen was born on 20 January 1920 at 15 Lansdowne Road, Kensington, London. She was the daughter of the politician and lawyer Harry Nathan, 1st Baron Nathan, who served in the British Army, and his wife Eleanor Joan Clara (Nellie), née Stettauer, a future late 1940s London County Council chairperson, and an important person in the Jewish community. Waley-Cohen went to school at Saint Felix School in Southwold, and graduated from Girton College, Cambridge with a Bachelor of Arts degree in 1941. She began her working career as an administrator in the Ministry of Fuel and Power in London. There, Waley-Cohen was led by the principal Bernard Waley-Cohen alongside Harold Wilson. The two were married on 21 December 1943 and they had four children: Rosalind, Stephen, Joanna and Robert. She took her husband's surname in 1950.

Following their marriage, Waley-Cohen supported her husband in his career as she raised their children and maintaining their house in St James's, Piccadilly and their 1,000-acre (400 ha) farm estate located close to the edge of Exmoor, where they kept sheep and a herd of Devon cattle. She became Lady Mayoress of London when her husband was elected the city's Lord Mayor in 1960, and the family moved to Mansion House, London, the Lord Mayor's 18th-century official residence. Waley-Cohen planned social occasions at the house and toured Australia in 1961 in which London's Lord Mayor made his first official visit to Melbourne.

== Educationalist ==
Waley-Cohen was able to find time for public service, particularly in education. She was an advocate of private and single-sex education and believed that single-sex education was better for girls than it was for boys for which they performed best in a mixed environment. From 1945 to 1983, Waley-Cohen was a member of Saint Felix School's governing body, on which she served as chair between 1970 and 1983. She was a member of the Governing Bodies of Girls' Schools Association from 1964 and she chaired between 1974 and 1979 as well as being the chair of the Independent Schools Joint Council from 1977 to 1980. Between 1978 and 1990, Waley-Cohen was the chair of Taunton School and Wellington College from 1979 to 1990. She was a member of the council of the advocate and independent sector lobbying Independent Schools Information Service from 1972 to 1980, which she chaired between 1981 and 1985.

Waley-Cohen served as chair of the board of the Westminster Children's Hospital between 1952 and 1968 and The Gordon Hospital from 1961 to 1968. For almost four decades, she was a Justice of the peace, serving in Middlesex between 1949 and 1959 and in Somerset from 1959 to 1986. In the late 1980s, Waley-Cohen settled down at Exmoor and took up gardening and started the craft tent at the Exford Show. She was predeceased by her husband in 1991. Waley-Cohen was a feverent supporter of the Devon and Somerset Staghounds, and presented its first meet following its ban by the National Trust in 1997. On 30 June 2013, she died at Honeymead House. Her funeral took place at Golders Green Crematorium on the morning of 4 July and a thanksgiving celebration was held for her at Simonsbath on the afternoon of 16 July.

The National Portrait Gallery, London holds a series of four quarter-plate glass negative photographic portraits of Waley-Cohen and her children in its collection.
