= Life Healthcare Group =

Private hospital company in South Africa

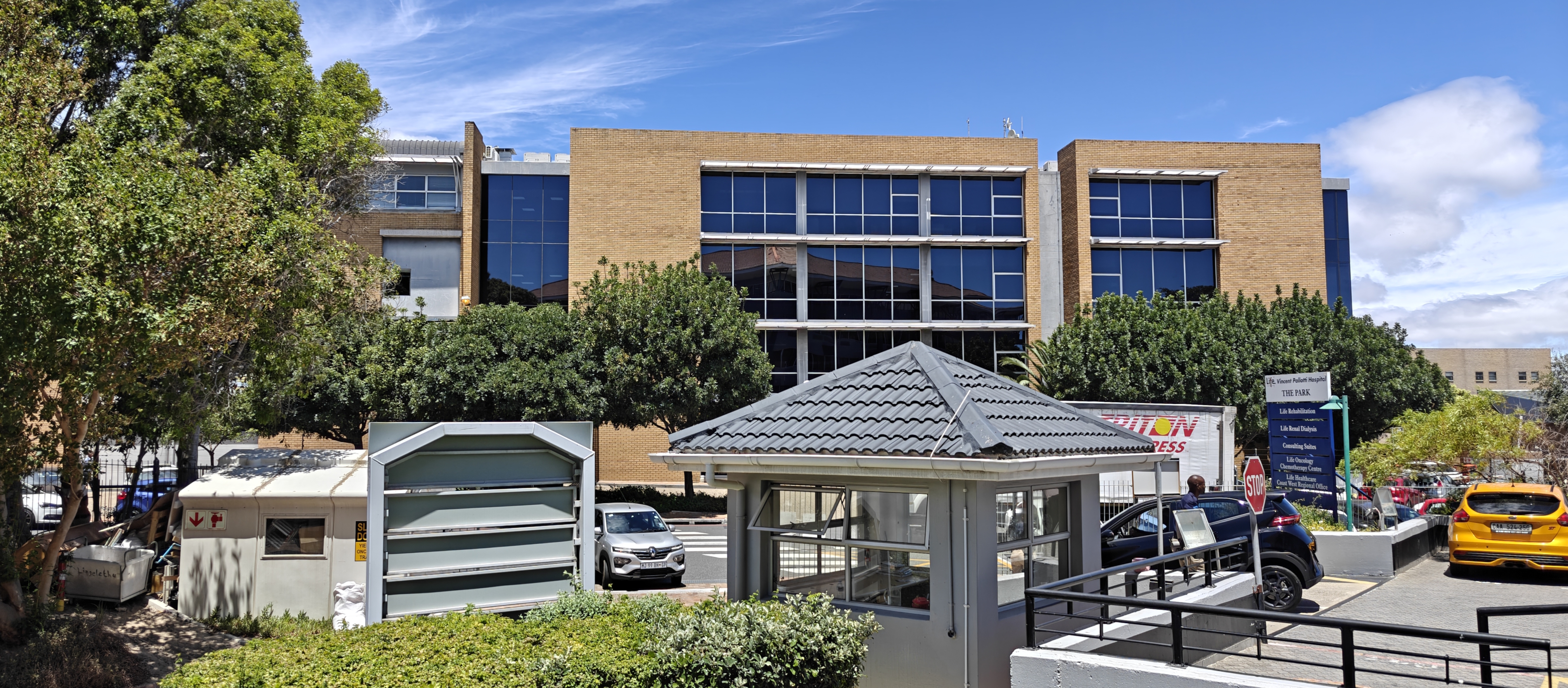
- The side of Life Vincent Pallotti Hospital in Pinelands, Cape Town
- Trade name: JSE: LHC
- Type: Public
- ISIN: ZAE000145892
- Industry: Private hospitals Healthcare
- Founded: 1983; 43 years ago
- Headquarters: Johannesburg, South Africa
- Number of locations: 75 main facilities (2025)
- Area served: Southern Africa
- Key people: Victor Litlhakanyane (Chairman); Peter Wharton-Hood (CEO)
- Services: Healthcare
- Revenue: ▲ R25.10 billion (2025)
- Operating income: ▼ -R508 million (2025)
- Net income: ▼ R3.86 billion (2025)
- Total assets: ▲ R25.69 billion (2025)
- Total equity: ▼ R12.14 billion (2025)
- Number of employees: 16,549 (2025)
- Website: lifehealthcare.co.za

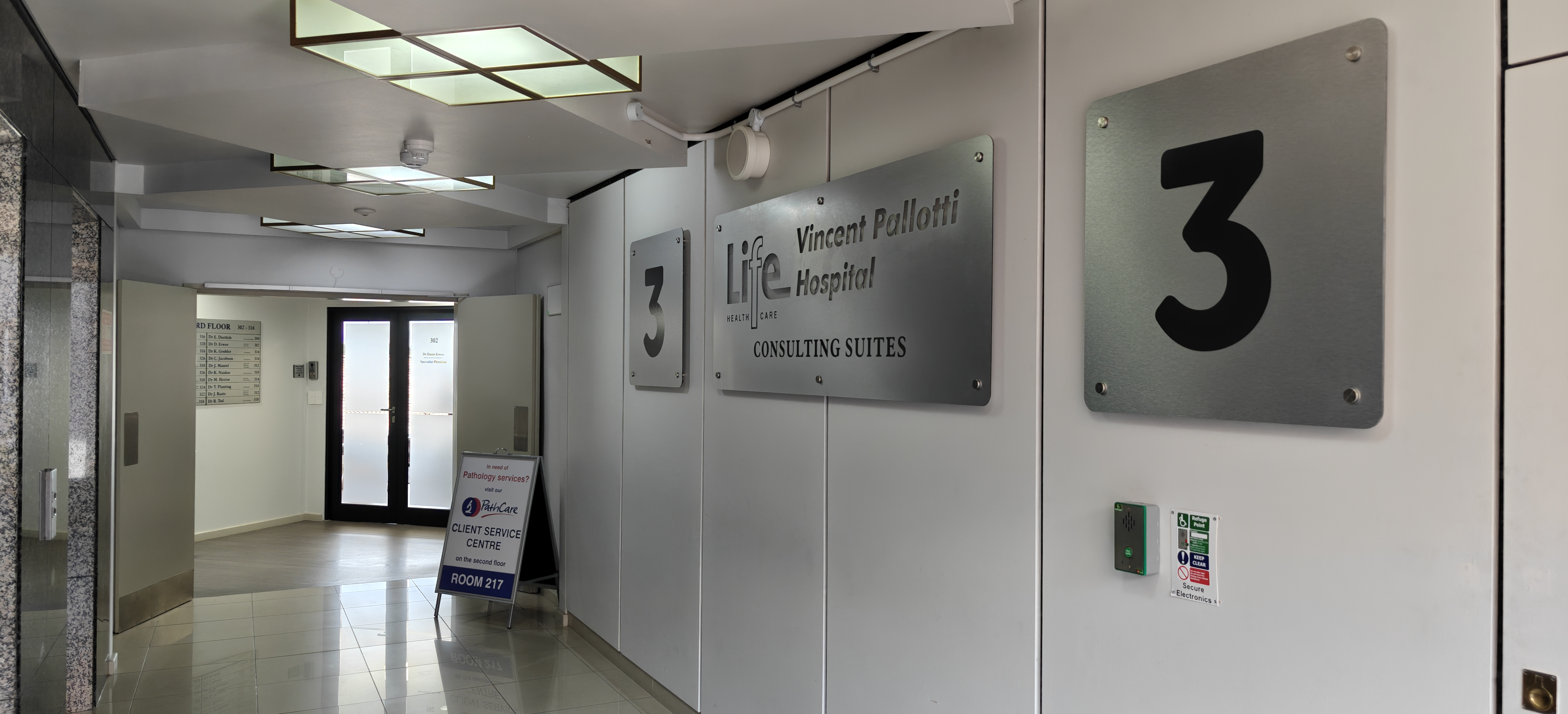
Consulting Suite signage at Life Vincent Pallotti Hospital in Cape Town

Life Healthcare Group (formerly Afrox Healthcare) is a South African private hospital group, founded in 1983.

Headquartered in Johannesburg, the group is focused on Southern Africa, operates 75 main private healthcare facilities, numerous additional clinics and other healthcare facilities, and employs over 16,500 people (including over 10,000 nurses) as of 2025.

== History ==
Founded as Afrox, the company was traded on the JSE Limited until it was sold to Business Venture Investments Limited (Bidco), a Black Economic Empowerment group, in 2005.

In November 2016, Life Healthcare bought European radiology services company Alliance Medical for around R10.4 billion.

In 2021, the group sold 100% of its shareholding in Polish healthcare group Scanmed.

The group sold its shareholding in Alliance Medical Group, a diagnostic imaging group, for a total of approximately R21 billion.

In July 2025, US radiology company Lantheus acquired Life Molecular Imaging from Life Healthcare. This formed part of an overall strategy for Life Healthcare to exit foreign markets and focus on expanding in Southern Africa.

== Operations ==
As of 2025, under its namesake brand, Life Healthcare operates 75 private healthcare facilities across South Africa, as well as in neighboring Botswana and Namibia. These include 42 major hospitals and 5 day hospitals. The company operates a further 7 Life Nkanyisa provincial government-contracted facilities, and 198 on-site clinics.

In 2025 the group reported employing over 16,500 individuals. Of those, over 10,000 were nurses, and a further 3,000 were specialists and allied professionals.

In the same year, the group stated that approximately 90% of its customers were those with private healthcare coverage (medical aids), while around 4% were government, 4% corporate, and 2% self-paying.

== Corporate social responsibility ==
In its 2025 annual report, Life Healthcare reported spending a total of R130 million on community initiatives as part of its CSR target - an increase over the previous year.
