= Whaley (surname) =

Whaley is a surname. Notable people with the surname include:

- Bill Whaley (1899–1943), American baseball player
- Burt Whaley, American politician
- Davyd Whaley (1967–2014), American painter
- Doug Whaley (born 1972), American football executive
- Eddie Whaley (1877–1960), American-born comic entertainer in Britain
- Frank Whaley (born 1963), American actor
- George Whaley (politician) (born 1860/61), Irish politician
- George Whaley (actor) (1934–2019), Australian actor and director
- Henry H. Whaley (c. 1818–after 1888), American mayor
- Janice Whaley (fl. 2010s), American musician
- Joanna Whaley, American politician
- John Corey Whaley (born 1984), American writer
- Kellian Whaley (1821–1876), American politician
- Lindsay J. Whaley (fl. 1980s–2000s), American linguist
- Michael Whaley (fl. 1980s–2020s), American actor
- Nan Whaley (born 1976), mayor of Dayton, Ohio
- Paul Whaley (1947–2019), American rock drummer
- Richard S. Whaley (1874–1951), American politician
- Robert Whaley (born 1982), American basketball player
- Robert H. Whaley (born 1943), American judge
- Robert J. Whaley (1840–1922), American banker
- Ross S. Whaley (fl. 1980s–2000s), American forester
- Ruth Whitehead Whaley (1901–1977), American lawyer
- Simon Whaley (born 1985), English footballer
- Suzy Whaley (born 1966), American golfer
- Thomas Whaley (1823–1890), American settler
- Thomas Whaley (politician) (1766–1800), Irish politician

== See also ==
- Waley
- Whale (surname)
- Whaler (surname)
