= Whale (surname) =

Whale is an English surname of unclear origin; however, it could be a derivation of Walh, a word generally used by Anglo-Saxon colonists to refer to native Britons, Romans or Celts after the Anglo-Saxon conquest of England. The Avebury stone circle, in Wiltshire, itself was referred to as waledich in the 13th century, a name still in use, as walldich, as late as 1696. Waledich literally means 'ditch of the wealas'.

According to the 1841 census of England, there are three main pockets of the surname; Avebury in Wiltshire, Southampton in Hampshire, and Dudley, then in Worcestershire.

Notable people with the surname include:

- George Whale (1842–1910), English locomotive engineer
- James Whale (1889–1957), English film director, theatre director and actor
- James Whale (presenter) (1951–2025), English broadcaster for radio and television
- Robert R. Whale (1805–1887), English/Canadian painter
- William Whale (1842–1903), Baptist minister in Brisbane, Australia

== See also ==
- Whaler (surname)
- Whaley (surname)
