= Alliance Medical =

Radiology services company

- Company type: Private
- Industry: Radiology services
- Founded: 1989
- Founder: Robert Waley-Cohen
- Area served: Europe
- Services: Diagnostic imaging (PET-CT, MRI, CT, Ultrasound, X-Ray)
- Owner: Icon Infrastructure Partners VI since January 2024

Alliance Medical is a radiology services company founded in 1989 by Robert Waley-Cohen operating across Europe.

== History ==
In 2010 Lloyds Bank, Commerzbank and M&G Investments acquired 85% of the company in a debt-for-equity swap.

A consortium, called the Collaborative Network, between the company and Christie Hospital NHS Foundation Trust won a ten-year NHS contract to provide PET-CT scanning services across 30 locations in England in January 2015. The contract provides for investment of £87 million over 10 years to install new scanners and improve the current infrastructure. Twenty-four existing sites will remain where they are, and six new sites will be added at Maidstone Hospital; William Harvey Hospital; Cumberland Infirmary; Lincoln County Hospital; Southmead Hospital; Royal United Hospital; and Royal Cornwall Hospital. The contract was awarded despite an NHS consortium bid being £7m cheaper.

In 2013 the company acquired IBA Molecular UK and Erigal, two of the three companies in England that produce the radioactive drug Fludeoxyglucose (18F), which is injected into patients as part of the imaging process. Siemens Healthcare is the only other UK producer.

It was bought by LIFE Healthcare Group for about 10.4 billion rand (£584 million, €680 million, $727 million) in November 2016.

It took over the running of the Taunton Diagnostic Centre, the first community diagnostic centre run by the independent sector in partnership with the NHS, in November 2022 after Rutherford Health went into liquidation. It provides Magnetic Resonance Imaging, Computed Tomography, Ultrasound and X-Ray facilities.
