= Noble Yeats =

Irish-bred Thoroughbred (2015–2026)

- Racing silks of Robert Waley-Cohen
- Sire: Yeats
- Grandsire: Sadler's Wells
- Dam: That's Moyne
- Damsire: Flemensfirth
- Sex: Gelding
- Foaled: 16 May 2015
- Died: 16 April 2026 (aged 10)
- Country: Ireland
- Colour: Bay
- Breeder: Kristene Hunter
- Owner: Robert Waley-Cohen
- Trainer: Emmet Mullins
- Record: 18:6-1-2
- Earnings: £699,822

Major wins
- Grand National (2022); M.W. Hickey Memorial Chase (2022); Many Clouds Chase (2022); Cleeve Hurdle (2024)
- Last updated on 5 December 2022

Noble Yeats (16 May 2015 – 16 April 2026) was an Irish-bred Thoroughbred racehorse who competed in National Hunt racing. In 2022 he won the Grand National under Sam Waley-Cohen, becoming the first seven year old horse to win the race since Bogskar in 1940.

== Background ==
Noble Yeats was a bay gelding bred by Kristene Hunter in Ireland. His sire was Coolmore stallion Yeats, winner of the Ascot Gold Cup in four consecutive years (2006 to 2009) and his dam was That's Moyne, a winner over hurdles. He was sold as a three-year-old in August 2018 to trainer Donal Hassett for €6,500. He made his racecourse debut on 1 December 2019, coming second in a point-to-point, and later that month was sold for £75,000.

Noble Yeats was euthanised after a severe bout of colic on 16 April 2026, at the age of 10.

== 2020/21 season ==
New owner Paul Byrne put Noble Yeats into training with Emmet Mullins. In December 2020 he came third in his first bumper (National Hunt flat race). The following month he secured his first victory, winning a bumper at Thurles. After another bumper, where he came sixth, he was raced over hurdles for the first time. Ridden by Brian Hayes, he started as the odds-on favourite in a maiden at Navan and won by twelve lengths.

== 2021/22 season ==
After a summer break of seven months, Noble Yeats ran in his first chase and won by a head. After this victory in a beginners' chase at Galway, his owner and trainer decided to enter him for the Grand National. Noble Yeats then ran in two Grade 3 races and two handicaps in Ireland, without being placed in the first three. On 5 February 2022 he had his first race in England, the Grade 2 Towton Novices' Chase at Wetherby Racecourse. He came second of four runners, beaten 5½ lengths by favourite Ahoy Senor. Later that month he was bought by Robert Waley-Cohen as a Grand National ride for his son, amateur jockey Sam Waley-Cohen. Noble Yeats remained in training with Mullins and his next outing was at the Cheltenham Festival where, ridden by Waley-Cohen, he came ninth of 24 runners in the Grade 3 Festival Trophy Handicap Chase.

On 9 April 2022 Noble Yeats, still technically a novice chaser, went off in the Grand National at odds of 50/1. Waley-Cohen had previously announced that it would be his final ride. For the first circuit, Waley-Cohen kept Noble Yeats at the back of the field, moving up to mid-field for the second circuit. Approaching the last, Noble Yeats was level with favourite Any Second Now. He took the lead on the run-in and finished ahead by 2¼ lengths. After the race Waley-Cohen was given a nine-day suspension and £400 fine for his use of the whip in the finish. Noble Yeats was the first seven-year-old to win the Grand National since Bogskar in 1940 and Waley-Cohen was the first amateur jockey to win the race since Marcus Armytage won on Mr Frisk in 1990. He was led into the winner's enclosure at Aintree by groom Mick Molloy. The day after the race he returned home to Leighlinbridge and a celebratory parade with his owner, jockey and trainer.

== Grand National record ==
| Grand National | Position | Jockey | Age | Weight | SP | Distance |
|---|---|---|---|---|---|---|
| 2022 | 1st | Sam Waley-Cohen | 7 | 10-10 | 50-1 | Won by 2¼ lengths |
| 2023 | 4th | Sean Bowen | 8 | 11-11 | 10-1 | 8½ lengths |

== Pedigree ==
Pedigree of Noble Yeats (IRE), bay gelding, 2015
| Sire Yeats (IRE) 2001 | Sadler's Wells; 1981 | Northern Dancer | Nearctic |
| Sire Yeats (IRE) 2001 | Sadler's Wells; 1981 | Northern Dancer | Natalma |
| Sire Yeats (IRE) 2001 | Sadler's Wells; 1981 | Fairy Bridge | Bold Reason |
| Sire Yeats (IRE) 2001 | Sadler's Wells; 1981 | Fairy Bridge | Special |
| Sire Yeats (IRE) 2001 | Lyndonville; 1988 | Top Ville | High Top |
| Sire Yeats (IRE) 2001 | Lyndonville; 1988 | Top Ville | Sega Ville |
| Sire Yeats (IRE) 2001 | Lyndonville; 1988 | Diamond Land | Sparkler I |
| Sire Yeats (IRE) 2001 | Lyndonville; 1988 | Diamond Land | Canaan |
| Dam That's Moyne (IRE) 2000 | Flemensfirth; 1992 | Alleged | Hoist The Flag |
| Dam That's Moyne (IRE) 2000 | Flemensfirth; 1992 | Alleged | Princess Pout |
| Dam That's Moyne (IRE) 2000 | Flemensfirth; 1992 | Etheldreda | Diesis |
| Dam That's Moyne (IRE) 2000 | Flemensfirth; 1992 | Etheldreda | Royal Bund |
| Dam That's Moyne (IRE) 2000 | It's Mine; 1991 | Yashgan | Hot Grove |
| Dam That's Moyne (IRE) 2000 | It's Mine; 1991 | Yashgan | Val Divine |
| Dam That's Moyne (IRE) 2000 | It's Mine; 1991 | Your Mine | Push On |
| Dam That's Moyne (IRE) 2000 | It's Mine; 1991 | Your Mine | Leebrook Lass |
