= Dorothea Waley Singer =

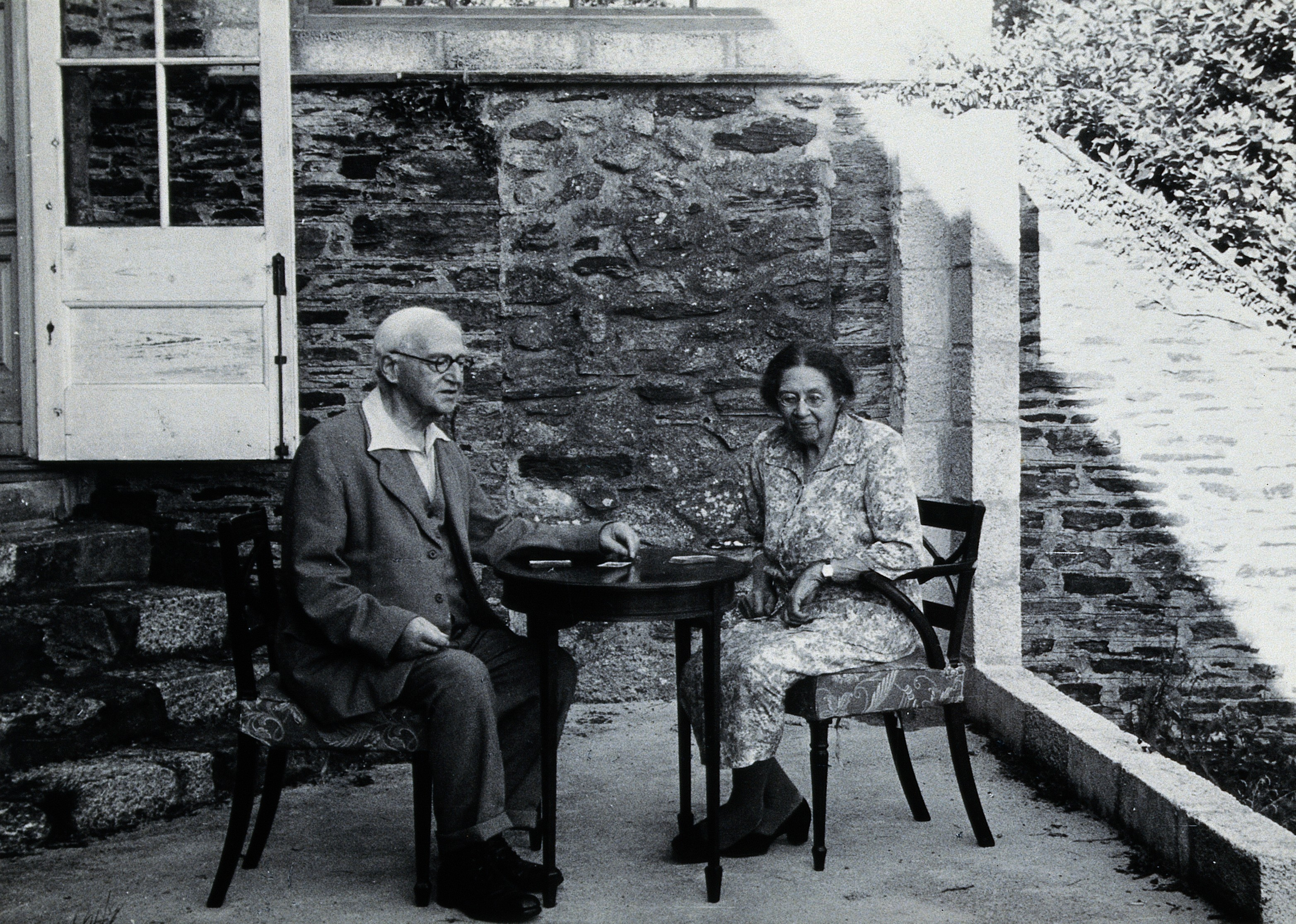
Dorothea Waley Singer with her husband in Kilmarth

Dorothea Waley Singer, b. Cohen (1882–1964) was a British palaeographer, historian of science, medical historian and philanthropist.

== Biography ==
Dorothea Waley Cohen was born in London on 17 December 1882. Her father was Nathaniel Louis Cohen, a stock broker, and her mother was Julia Matilda Waley. The industrialist and prominent leader of the Anglo-Jewish community, Sir Robert Waley Cohen, was one of her brothers, as was Charles Waley Cohen, a soldier, barrister and Liberal Party politician. The English jurist and economist Jacob Waley their maternal grandfather. Dorothea Cohen studied arts at Queen's College, London. In 1910 she married the physician Charles Singer. The couple later adopted two children, Andrew Waley Singer and Nancy Waley Singer. Nancy went on to marry Edgar Ashworth Underwood, the director of the Wellcome Institute for the History of Medicine.

At the time of her marriage Dorothea already was an aspiring expert on scientific manuscripts of the middle ages, and devoted herself to numerous philanthropic activities. For Charles Singer's career, marriage to the wealthy palaeographer proved to be a turning point. His first historic work, on Benjamin Marten, a precursor of Louis Pasteur, appeared in 1911. With the support of his wife Charles Singer became one the central figures of interwar history of science and medicine. In turn, by his side Dorothea Singer trained herself as a medical historian. Her first papers were co-authored with her husband, starting with a publication on the development of contagium vivum, a concept relating to the theory of microorganisms as the cause of infectious diseases. By 1927 seven more joint papers had appeared, among them studies on the plague, the physician and poet Girolamo Fracastoro and the school of Salerno. Dorothea Singer also participated very actively in the planning and implementation of the famous 2nd International Congress on the History of Science and Technology in London, 29 June – 4 July 1931, over which Charles Singer presided.

In parallel she started her own line of research specializing in Medieval and Early Modern palaeography. Her discussion of over 100 plague treatises from 1348 to 1485 appeared in 1916. During Charles' absence on war service she also began to dedicate herself to the monumental project of cataloguing all medical and scientific manuscripts in Great Britain and Northern Ireland from the Middle Ages to the early modern era. She had found over 30,000 by the end of 1918, presenting her results at the History of Medicine Society, the first women to do so in the history of the Society. The first volume of her catalogue of alchemical manuscripts was published in 1924 by the Union Académique Internationale, focussing on the Greek manuscripts. A further three volumes appeared in the years up to 1931, dealing with Latin and vernacular manuscripts. Based on her experiences with this project Dorothea Singer gave presentations on palaeography at the University of California, where the Singers stayed in 1930 and 1932 (Charles Singer had accepted invitations as visiting professor). Dorothea Singer's card index on the project survives to this day in the Department of Manuscripts at the British Library, where it fills over 100 boxes.

In the early 1930s Dorothea Singer began to study the work of Giordano Bruno, producing a first draft of a monograph on the subject by 1932. Yet the escalating political crisis in central Europe increasingly absorbed the socially committed Singers, leaving little time for historical research. While Charles became active in the mission of the Society for the Protection of Science and Learning, founded in 1933 in reaction to antisemitic discrimination in Nazi Germany, Dorothea welcomed refugees and arranged for their placement. At times she herself offered English conversation lessons in an effort to help scientific refugees to become 'America ready'.

After the end of World War II Dorothea Singer was able to return to her studies. In December 1946 her essay on alchemical texts under Plato's alleged authorship appeared in the journal Ambix, followed by a long treatise (in three parts) on the Scottish physician Sir John Pringle in 1949 and 1950. Her intellectual biography on Bruno came out in 1950 under the title Giordano Bruno: his life and thought, containing her commentated translation of Bruno's third philosophical dialogue, De l'infinito, universo e mondi of 1584 (On the infinite, the universe and the worlds).

In 1956, Dorothea Singer was awarded the George Sarton Medal jointly with her husband. For many years she served on the managing board of the Académie Internationale d'Histoire des Sciences (founded in 1928), as well as vice president of the Union International d'Histoire des Sciences, over whose bibliographical commission she presided for many years. She also was a founding member of the British Society for the History of Science and its first vice president from 1947 to 1950, as well as a member of several other academic societies. With a number of eminent scientists of her time she was in close contact, among them Julian Sorell Huxley as well as the biochemist and sinologist Joseph Needham, the greatest authority on Chinese history of science of his era. With Needham she conducted an extensive correspondence.

The Singers resided in London until 1914, when they moved to Oxford as Charles started to work with Sir William Osler on the history of medicine. In 1920 they relocated to Highgate, London. From 1934 they rented Kilmarth, a stately home on a cliff not far from the fishing village Fowey, near Par in Cornwall. Here Dorothea Waley Singer died four years after her husband on 24 June 1964. At Kilmarth the Singers were succeeded by the novelist Daphne du Maurier. The house, whose foundations date back to the 14th century, formed the background of du Maurier's novel of time travel, The house on the strand (1969).
