= Abass Alavi =

Iranian-American physician-scientist

- Persian: عباس علوی
- Born: Tabriz, Iran
- Education: Tehran University of Medical Sciences (M.D., 1964); University of Bologna (Honorary M.D., 2007); Shiraz University (Honorary Ph.D, 2007); University of the Sciences (Honorary D.Sc, 2008); Tabriz University of Medical Sciences (Honorary M.D., 2015); Gdańsk Medical University (Honorary M.D., 2016)
- Awards: Georg Charles de Hevesy Nuclear Pioneer Award (2004); Benedict Cassen Prize (2012)
- Scientific career
- Fields: Molecular imaging
- Workplaces: University of Pennsylvania; Department of Radiology

Abass Alavi (Persian: عباس علوی) is an Iranian-American physician-scientist specializing in the field of molecular imaging, most notably in the imaging modality of positron emission tomography (PET). In August 1976, he was part of the team that performed the first human PET studies of the brain and whole body using the radiotracer [18F]Fluorodeoxyglucose (FDG). Alavi holds the position of Professor of Radiology and Neurology, as well as Director of Research Education in the Department of Radiology at the University of Pennsylvania. Over a career spanning five decades, he has amassed over 2,300 publications and 91,000 citations, earning an h-index of 146 as well as an I10-index of 978, and placing his publication record in the top percentile of scientists.

== Early life and education ==
Abass Alavi was born in Tabriz, the largest city in northwestern Iran. After graduating from high school in Tabriz, Alavi moved to Tehran and received his medical degree from the Tehran University of Medical Sciences in 1964. He began his training in internal medicine at the Albert Einstein Medical Center and the Philadelphia VA Hospital in 1966. Following subspecialization in hematology/oncology at the University of Pennsylvania, Alavi started his education in medical imaging by enrolling in the radiology department at the Harvard-affiliated Beth Israel Deaconess Medical Center. He joined the University of Pennsylvania School of Medicine in 1971 as a research fellow in nuclear medicine, and was soon appointed to the faculty. He currently holds appointments as Professor and Director of Research Education in the Department of Radiology.

- 1964: Medical doctorate(MD), University of Tehran, School of Medicine
- 1966: Intern, Rotating Internal Medicine, A. Einstein Medical Center, Philadelphia
- 1968: Resident, Internal Medicine, VA Medical Center
- 1969: Fellow, Hematology- Oncology, Hospital of the University of Pennsylvania
- 1970: Resident, Radiology, Beth Israel Deaconess Medical Center, Boston

== Later life and career ==
Alavi began his work in tomographic imaging under the guidance of Dr. David Kuhl. He and his colleagues at the University of Pennsylvania were pioneers in performing modern tomographic imaging by utilizing single gamma emitting radionuclides (Single Photon Emission Computer Tomography/SPECT). In 1973, he—along with his colleagues Dr. Kuhl and Dr. Martin Reivich—were the first scientists to conceive the idea of labeling deoxyglucose with positron-emitting fluoride (F-18), leading to the development of FDG. In August 1976, Alavi became the first to administer FDG to a human being and acquire tomographic images of the brain and whole body. He was also among the first to utilize Iodine-123 in the diagnosis of thyroid cancer, MIBG in the assessment of pheochromocytoma, radiolabeled WBCs in the evaluation of infection, and 99mTc in the detection of gastrointestinal bleeds, among a host of other discoveries.

Alavi has been associated with the University of Pennsylvania for all of his career, beginning with a fellowship in Nuclear Medicine in 1971–1973. He was promoted to professor of radiology in 1982, and served as chief of the Division of Nuclear Medicine from 1979 to 2006. Since then, he has been the director of research education in the Department of Radiology.

Alavi has performed numerous research studies utilizing FDG since its inception. Furthermore, soon after the introduction of CT in the early '70s and MRI in the early '80s, Alavi has conducted research that combines PET with these imaging modalities. He is an expert in modern imaging techniques and the clinical applications of PET imaging for the detection of cancer and other disorders including dementia, seizures, cardiovascular disease, and infection.

Alavi served as a member and chairman of scientific study sections at the NIH and American Cancer Society. He has trained and mentored countless students in modern imaging techniques, and many of his former students and research fellows now occupy leadership positions in medical imaging across the world.

- 1971-1973: Fellow, Nuclear Medicine, Hospital of the University of Pennsylvania, Philadelphia
- 1973-1974: Instructor in Radiology, Dept. of Radiology, Univ. of Pennsylvania School of Medicine
- 1974-1977: Assistant Professor Radiology, Dept. of Radiology, Univ. of Pennsylvania School of Medicine
- 1977-1982: Associate Professor of Radiology, Dept. of Radiology, Univ. of Pennsylvania School of Medicine
- 1979-2006: Chief, Division of Nuclear Medicine, Hospital of the University of Pennsylvania
- 1979-1991: Co-director, Positron Emission Tomography Center, University of Pennsylvania
- 1991-2006: Medical Director, Positron Emission Tomography Center, University of Pennsylvania
- 1982–present: Professor of Radiology, Department of Radiology, University of Pennsylvania School of Medicine
- 1984–present: Associate Director, Center for the Study of Aging, University of Pennsylvania
- 2006–present: Director of Research Education, Department of Radiology, University of Pennsylvania

== PET ==
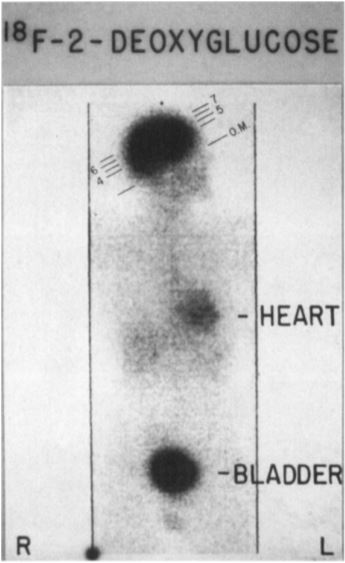
The first total body FDG scan

Positron emission tomography (PET) is a medical imaging technique that produces a three-dimensional image of molecular processes in the body. The system detects pairs of gamma rays emitted as a result of the annihilation of positrons emitted from radionuclides (tracers), which are used to label biologically active molecules.

One of the factors most responsible for the widespread adoption of positron imaging was the development of radiopharmaceuticals. In particular, the development of labeled 2-Fludeoxyglucose (18F) (2FDG) through the collaboration between scientists at the Brookhaven National Laboratory and investigators at the University of Pennsylvania, was a major factor in expanding the scope of PET imaging. The compound was first administered to two normal human volunteers by Alavi in August 1976 at the University of Pennsylvania.

In 1999, after decades of research demonstrating the unique and versatile utility of PET and the functional data it provides, the modality was approved for reimbursement by the Centers for Medicare and Medicaid Services (CMS) and rapidly became a cornerstone of the evaluation of a host of diseases, most notably cancers.

It is now well established that without the introduction of FDG to medicine, the field of molecular imaging with PET would have been confined to major research institutions, precluding its current widespread clinical applications. In addition, FDG has resulted in the exploration of numerous biologically important compounds in research and drug development.

== Awards, honors and membership in honorary societies ==
Alavi is the recipient of many awards and distinctions, among which are the highest distinctions in nuclear medicine: the Georg Charles de Hevesy Nuclear Pioneer Award given by the Society of Nuclear Medicine, the Cassen Prize of the Society of Nuclear Medicine, and honorary degrees from the University of Bologna, the University of the Sciences in Philadelphia and Shiraz University in Iran. The de Hevesy Award from the Society of Nuclear Medicine was given to Alavi for his pioneering work in the development of positron emission tomography.

He is an expert in modern imaging techniques and in the clinical applications of PET imaging for the detection of cancer as well as neurological, cardiovascular, and infectious disorders.

- 1971-73: Postdoctoral NIH Fellowship in Nuclear Medicine
- 1982: Member, Steering and Executive Committees, Prospective Investigation of Pulmonary Embolism Diagnosis, Chairman, Nuclear Medicine Working Group
- 1984: Who's Who, Frontiers of Science and Technology
- 1984-88: Trustee, Society of Nuclear Medicine
- 1985: Fellow of the Center for the Study of Aging, University of Pennsylvania
- 1985: Fellow, American College of Nuclear Physicians
- 1992: Fred Joliot visiting professor at Orsay, France
- 1992: Evan-Jone Memorial Lecture, U of MDS, London
- 1994: IVRA - Keynote speaker
- 1994: Taylor Lectureship award - Dept. of Psychiatry, University of Maryland
- 1995: Benedict Cassen Memorial Symposium, CA
- 1996: 6th Asia & Oceania Congress - award for Outstanding Contributions
- 1997: Sarabhai Memorial Oration award - Society of Nuclear Medicine of India
- 1999: The 11th Annual Berson-Yalow Award - Greater NY Chapter Society of Nuclear Medicine
- 1999: Best Doctors in America
- 2001: One of two Finalists, "Most influential Radiology Researchers, AuntMinnie.com's Annual Event to recognize Excellence in Radiology
- 2001: Distinguished Service Award, Indo-American Society of Nuclear Medicine , IASNM, for outstanding contribution to nuclear medicine and promotion of IASNM
- 2001: member, American Board of Nuclear Medicine
- 2001: Taplin Pioneer Award in Nuclear Medicine
- 2004: Georg Charles de Hevesy Nuclear Pioneer Award, 51st Annual Meeting of the Society of Nuclear Medicine
- 2005: Member, (Ad Hoc Chairman), NIH/CSR/ZRG1 SBIB-Q50
- 2005: Chairman, NIH/CSR/ZRG1 SBIB-Q13
- 2006: Mentor of the Year Award, American College of Nuclear Medicine Physicians
- 2006: Fellow, World Innovation Foundation
- 2007: Honorary Doctoral Degree (Laurea ad honorem, Medicina e Chirurgia), University of Bolognia, Italy
- 2007: Honorary PhD Degree in Molecular Biology, University of Shiraz
- 2007: Member, Honorary Editorial Board, Drug Design, Development and Therapy
- 2008: Member, Honorary Editorial Board, Journal of Receptor, Ligand and Channel Research, Dove Medical Press
- 2008: Life Member, American Board of Nuclear Medicine
- 2008: Honorary Doctoral Degree (DSc), University of the Sciences in Philadelphia
- 2008: The most published and most cited faculty at PENN
- 2010: Member, College of CSR Reviewers, National Institute of Health
- 2011: Editor-in-Chief, Current Molecular Imaging
- 2012: Organizing Committee Member, International Conference & Exhibition on Personalized Medicine and Molecular Diagnostics
- 2012: Benedict Cassen Prize for Research in Nuclear Medicine, Annual Meeting of the SNM
- 2015: Recipient of Gold Medal of City of Tabriz, Tabriz, Iran
- 2015: Recipient of gold medal of National Institute for Medical Research Development, Tehran, Iran
- 2016: Recipient, honorary Doctor of Medicine degree from the Medical University of Gdansk, Gdansk, Poland
- 2016: Recipient, honorary doctorate degree from the University of Southern Denmark
- 2017: Gold Medal Recipient, American College of Nuclear Medicine
- 2021: RG score 57
- 2022: Recipient of Lifetime Achievement Award, Annual Conference of the Society of Nuclear Medicine India, New Delhi
- 2026: Top D-Index (Discipline Score) of 138, Research.com
- 2026: Top PENN i10-Index (Impact Score) of 978,
- 2026: Ranked #1 at University of Pennsylvania, AD Scientific Index 2026
- 2026: Ranked #1 Highly Ranked Scholars, Specialty of “Positron Emission Tomography”, ScholarGPS
- 2026: h-Index of 146 and more than 91,000 citations, Google Scholar

== Other appearances ==
Alavi has been a long-time supporter of educational and research opportunities for students in nuclear medicine. While his name is associated with the Alavi-Mandell Awards, which recognize trainees and young scientists who publish articles as senior authors in the Journal of Nuclear Medicine, he also supports the Pilot Research Grants and the Bradley-Alavi Student Fellowship Awards. Bradley-Alavi Fellows are named in honor of the late Stanley E. Bradley, a professor of medicine at Columbia University College of Physicians and Surgeons and a prominent researcher in the fields of renal physiology and liver disease, and Abass Alavi, M.D., professor of radiology and chief of the division of nuclear medicine at the University of Pennsylvania Medical Center. funded by the Education and Research Foundation of the Society of Nuclear Medicine. In 2021 Alavi co-founded Bashir-Alavi Award with Humayun Bashir for the best cancer related research publication from Pakistan. This award is announced annually at the Shaukat Khanum Cancer Symposium.
