= Waley-Cohen baronets =

Baronetcy in the Baronetage of the United Kingdom

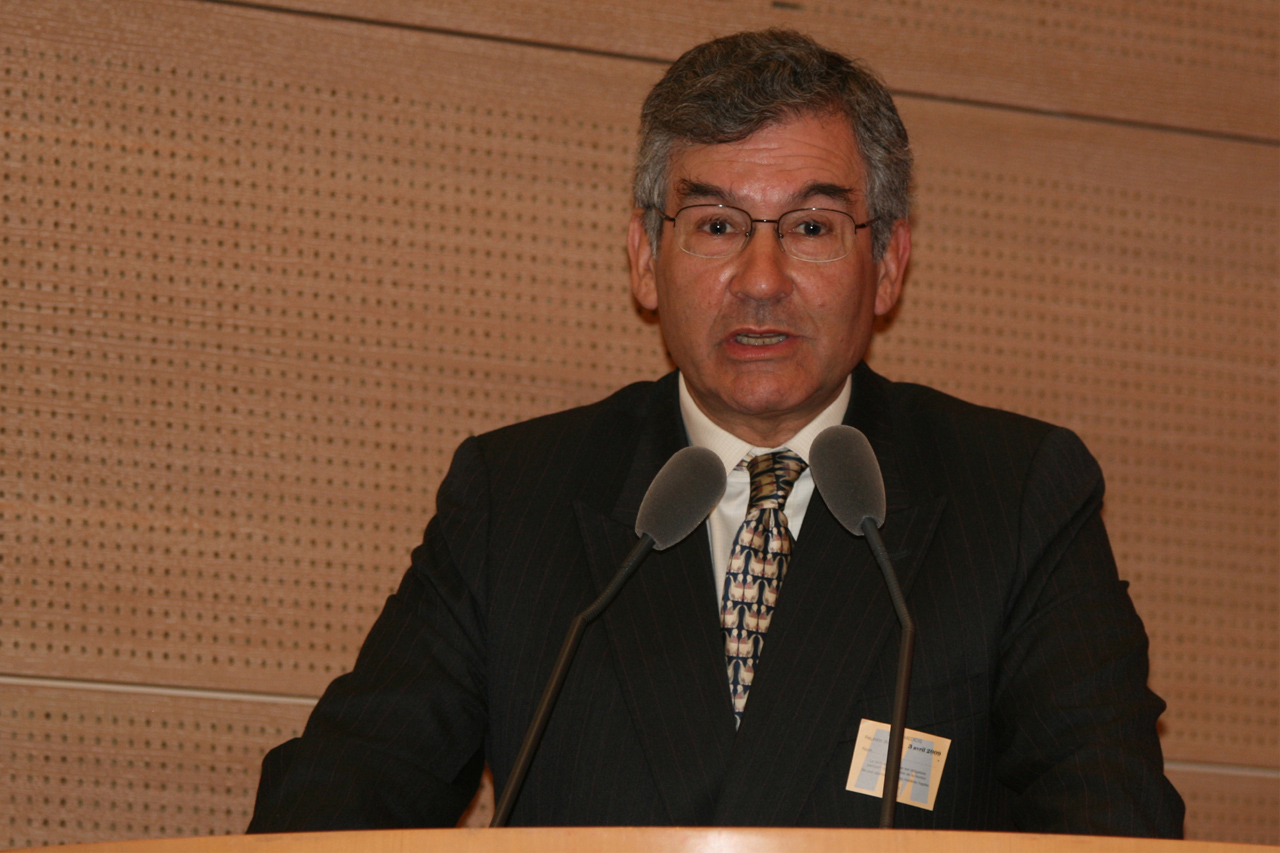
Sir Stephen Waley-Cohen, 2nd Baronet, photographed in 2009

The Waley-Cohen Baronetcy, of Honeymead in the county of Somerset, is a title in the Baronetage of the United Kingdom. It was created on 11 December 1961 for Sir Bernard Waley-Cohen, Lord Mayor of London from 1960 to 1961 and the son of Robert Waley Cohen. Born Bernard Nathaniel Waley Cohen, he assumed by deed poll his last forename as an additional surname in 1950. As of 2012 the title is held by his son, the second Baronet, who succeeded in 1991.

== Waley-Cohen baronets, of Honeymead (1961) ==
- Sir Bernard Nathaniel Waley-Cohen, 1st Baronet (1914–1991)
- Sir Stephen Harry Waley-Cohen, 2nd Baronet (born 1946)

Heir: Lionel Robert Waley-Cohen (born 1974)

== Arms ==
Coat of arms of Waley-Cohen baronets

Crest
1st a buck's head couped Argent attired Or holding in the mouth a rose slipped Gules the neck encircled by a wreath of oak Proper between four barrulets Gules (Cohen); 2nd out of a bush of fern a hind's head Proper in the mouth a rose Argent stalked and leaved also Proper (Waley).
Escutcheon
Quarterly: 1st & 4th Argent on a chevron Gules cottised Azure between in chief two roses of the second barbed and seeded Proper and in base a buck's head couped also Proper three annulets Or (Cohen); 2nd & 3rd Argent a chevron Azure cottised Sable between in chief two eagles displayed of the last and in base on a mount Vert a hind trippant Proper (Waley).
Motto
All for the Best
