= Whalers Bluff Lighthouse =

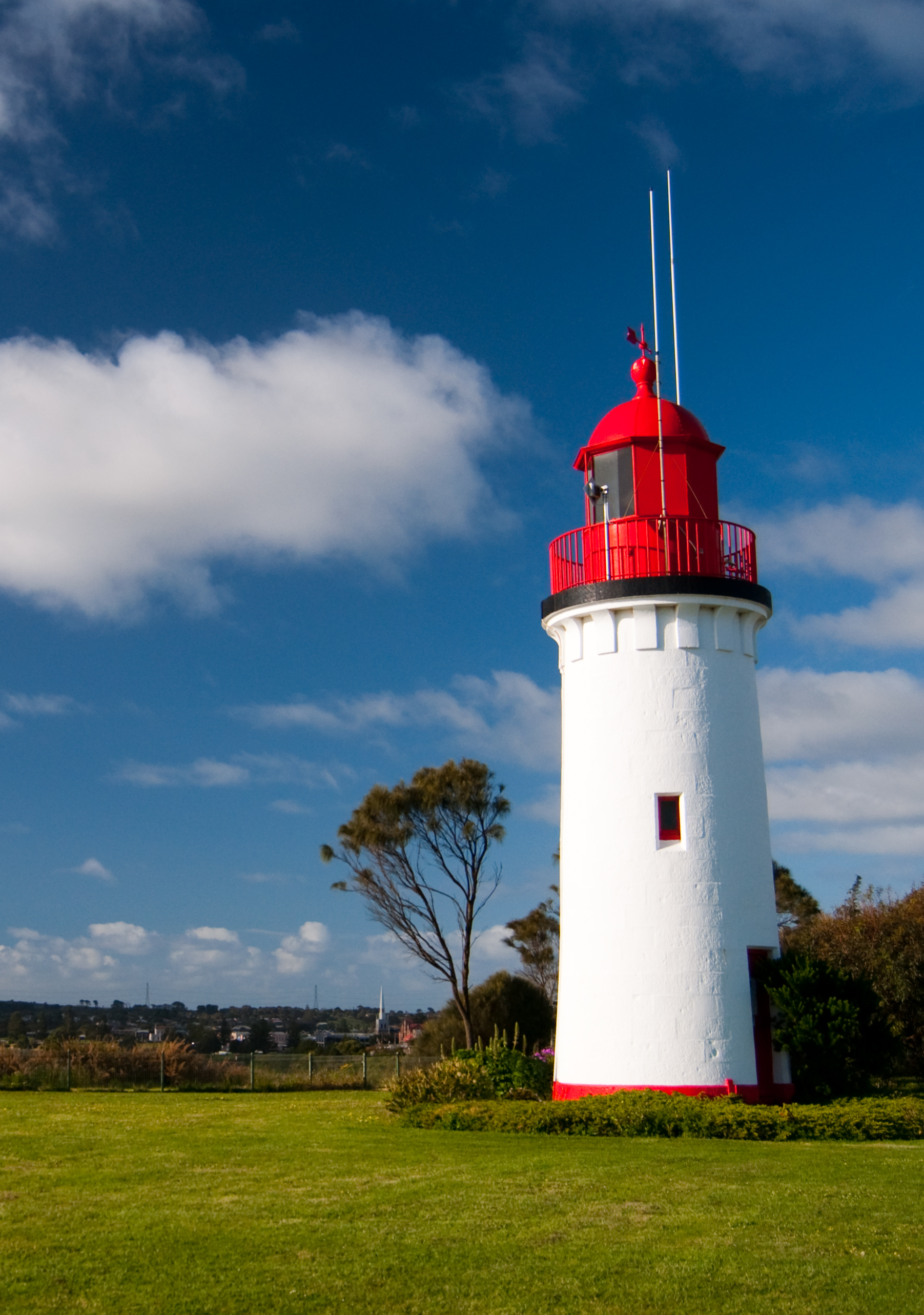
- Location: Portland; Victoria; Australia
- Coordinates: 38°20′14″S 141°36′33″E

Tower
- Construction: bluestone tower
- Height: 12 metres (39 ft)
- Shape: ylindrical tower with balcony and lantern
- Markings: white tower, red trim and lantern

Light
- First lit: 1859 (Battery Point); 1889 (Whalers Bluff)
- Focal height: 41 metres (135 ft)
- Lens: catadioptric lantern
- Range: 15 nautical miles (28 km; 17 mi)
- Characteristic: Fl WR 10 s.

Whalers Bluff Lighthouse is a lighthouse on Whalers Bluff, also known as Whalers Point, in the regional city of Portland in the Western District of the state of Victoria in Australia. It stands about 1.5 km north of the city centre and overlooks Portland's harbour. It is operated by the Victorian Channels Authority, part of the Port of Melbourne Corporation.

== History ==
The lighthouse was originally built at Battery Point in Portland in 1859 and was known as the Portland Bay Light. In 1889 it was relocated, stone by stone, to Whalers Bluff in order to make room for gun emplacements at Battery Point.

== See also ==
- List of lighthouses in Australia

== Sources ==
- "Whalers Bluff Lighthouse". Lighthouses of Victoria. Lighthouses of Australia Inc.
- Rowlett, Russ. "Lighthouses of Australia: Victoria". The Lighthouse Directory. University of North Carolina at Chapel Hill.
