= Fluorodeoxyglucose (18F) =

Fluorodeoxyglucose (^{18}F)
- Stereo skeletal formula of fluorodeoxyglucose (18F) ((2S,6R)-6-meth,-2-ol)

Names
- IUPAC names 2-Deoxy-2-[^{18}F]fluoroglucose

Identifiers
CAS Number	63503-12-8 (2S,6R)-6-meth,-2-ol
3D model (JSmol)	Interactive image
Abbreviations	[^{18}F]FDG
Beilstein Reference	2047723
ChEBI	CHEBI:49130
ChEMBL	ChEMBL497613
ChemSpider	396785; 8096174 (2R,6R)-6-meth,-2-ol; 9644274 (6R)-6-meth
KEGG	D01843
PubChem CID	11469444 (6R)-6-meth; 9920539 (2R,6R)-6-meth,-2-ol; 450503 (2S,6R)-6-meth,-2-ol; 25173432 (2S)-2-ol
UNII	0Z5B2CJX4D
CompTox Dashboard (EPA)	DTXSID50894178 DTXSID40212908, DTXSID50894178
- InChI: InChI=1S/C6H11FO5/c7-3-5(10)4(9)2(1-8)12-6(3)11/h2-6,8-11H,1H2/t2-,3-,4-,5-,6+/m1/s1/i7-1 Key: ZCXUVYAZINUVJD-AHXZWLDOSA-N
- SMILES: OCC1OC(O)[C@H]([18F])[C@@H](O)[C@@H]1O

Properties
Chemical formula	C_{6}H_{11}^{18}FO_{5}
Molar mass	181.1495 g mol^{−1}
Melting point	170 to 176 °C (338 to 349 °F; 443 to 449 K)

Pharmacology
ATC code	V09IX04 (WHO)
Pregnancy category	AU: X (High risk)
Routes of administration	Intravenous
- Pharmacokinetics
Metabolism	6-Phosphorylation Glycolysis
Biological half-life	110 min (at 70%) 16 min (at 20%)
Excretion	20% Radioactivity renally excreted in two hours
- Except where otherwise noted, data are given for materials in their standard state (at 25 °C [77 °F], 100 kPa). verify (what is ?) Infobox references

[^{18}F]Fluorodeoxyglucose (INN), or fluorodeoxyglucose F 18 (USAN and USP), also commonly called fluorodeoxyglucose and abbreviated [^{18}F]FDG, 2-[^{18}F]FDG or FDG, is a radiopharmaceutical, specifically a radiotracer, used in the medical imaging modality positron emission tomography (PET). Chemically, it is 2-deoxy-2-[^{18}F]fluoro-D-glucose, a glucose analog, with the positron-emitting radionuclide fluorine-18 substituted for the normal hydroxyl group at the C-2 position in the glucose molecule.

The uptake of [^{18}F]FDG by tissues is a marker for the tissue uptake of glucose, which in turn is closely correlated with certain types of tissue metabolism. After [^{18}F]FDG is injected into a patient, a PET scanner can form two-dimensional or three-dimensional images of the distribution of [^{18}F]FDG within the body.

Since its development in 1976, [^{18}F]FDG has had a profound influence on research in the neurosciences. The subsequent discovery in 1980 that [^{18}F]FDG accumulates in tumors underpins the evolution of PET as a major clinical tool in cancer diagnosis. [^{18}F]FDG is now the standard radiotracer used for PET neuroimaging and cancer patient management.

The images can be assessed by a nuclear medicine physician or radiologist to provide diagnoses of various medical conditions.

== History ==
In 1968, Josef Pacák, Zdeněk Točík, and Miloslav Černý at the Department of Organic Chemistry, Charles University, Czechoslovakia were the first to describe the synthesis of FDG. Later, in the 1970s, Tatsuo Ido and Al Wolf at the Brookhaven National Laboratory were the first to describe the synthesis of FDG labeled with fluorine-18. The compound was first administered to two human volunteers by Abass Alavi in August 1976 at the University of Pennsylvania. Brain images obtained with an ordinary (non-PET) nuclear scanner demonstrated the concentration of [^{18}F]FDG in that organ (see history reference below).

Beginning in August 1990, and continuing throughout 1991, a shortage of oxygen-18, a raw material for FDG, made it necessary to ration isotope supplies. Israel's oxygen-18 facility had shut down due to the Gulf War, and the U.S. government had shut down its isotopes of carbon, oxygen and nitrogen facility at Los Alamos National Laboratory, leaving Isotec as the main supplier.

== Synthesis ==
[^{18}F]FDG was first synthesized via electrophilic fluorination with [^{18}F]F_{2}. Subsequently, a "nucleophilic synthesis" was devised with the same radioisotope.

As with all radioactive ^{18}F-labeled radioligands, the fluorine-18 must be made initially as the fluoride anion in a cyclotron. Synthesis of complete [^{18}F]FDG radioactive tracer begins with synthesis of the unattached fluoride radiotracer, since cyclotron bombardment destroys organic molecules of the type usually used for ligands, and in particular, would destroy glucose.

Cyclotron production of fluorine-18 may be accomplished by bombardment of neon-20 with deuterons, but usually is done by proton bombardment of ^{18}O-enriched water, causing a (p-n) reaction (sometimes called a "knockout reaction" – a common type of nuclear reaction with high probability where an incoming proton "knocks out" a neutron) in the ^{18}O. This produces "carrier-free" dissolved [^{18}F]fluoride ([^{18}F]F^{−}) ions in the water. The 109.8-minute half-life of fluorine-18 makes rapid and automated chemistry necessary after this point.

Anhydrous fluoride salts, which are easier to handle than fluorine gas, can be produced in a cyclotron. To achieve this chemistry, the [^{18}F]F^{−} is separated from the aqueous solvent by trapping it on an ion-exchange column, and eluted with an acetonitrile solution of 2,2,2-cryptand and potassium carbonate. Evaporation of the eluate gives [(crypt-222)K]^{+} [^{18}F]F^{−} (2) .

The nucleophilic fluoride anion is basic, so anhydrous conditions are required to avoid competing reactions involving hydroxide, which is also a good nucleophile. The use of the cryptand to sequester the potassium ions avoids ion-pairing between free potassium and fluoride ions, rendering the fluoride anion more reactive.

Intermediate 2 is treated with the protected mannose triflate (1); the fluoride anion displaces the triflate leaving group in an S_{N}2 reaction, giving the protected fluorinated deoxyglucose (3). Base hydrolysis removes the acetyl protecting groups, giving the desired product (4) after removing the cryptand via ion-exchange:

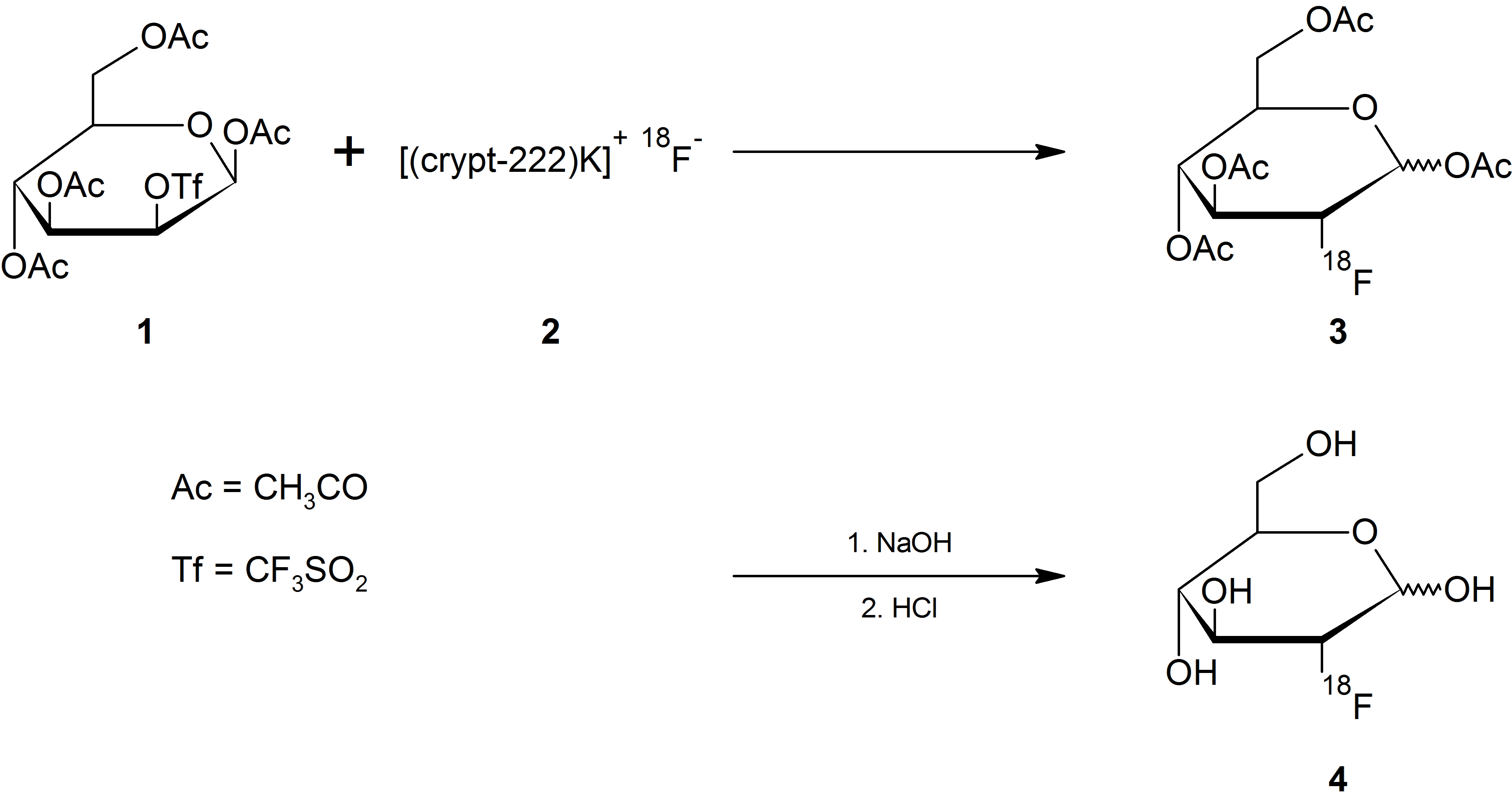

== Mechanism of action, metabolic end-products, and metabolic rate ==
[^{18}F]FDG, as a glucose analog, is taken up by high-glucose-using cells such as brain, brown adipocytes, kidney, and cancer cells, where phosphorylation prevents the glucose from being released again from the cell, once it has been absorbed. The 2-hydroxyl group (–OH) in normal glucose is needed for further glycolysis (metabolism of glucose by splitting it), but [^{18}F]FDG is missing this 2-hydroxyl. Thus, in common with its sister molecule 2-deoxy-D-glucose, FDG cannot be further metabolized in cells. The [^{18}F]FDG-6-phosphate formed when [^{18}F]FDG enters the cell cannot exit the cell before radioactive decay. As a result, the distribution of [^{18}F]FDG is a good reflection of the distribution of glucose uptake and phosphorylation by cells in the body.

The fluorine in [^{18}F]FDG decays radioactively via beta-decay to ^{18}O^{−}. After picking up a proton H^{+} from a hydronium ion in its aqueous environment, the molecule becomes glucose-6-phosphate labeled with harmless nonradioactive "heavy oxygen" in the hydroxyl at the C-2 position. The new presence of a 2-hydroxyl now allows it to be metabolized normally in the same way as ordinary glucose, producing non-radioactive end-products.

Although in theory all [^{18}F]FDG is metabolized as above with a radioactivity elimination half-life of 110 minutes (the same as that of fluorine-18), clinical studies have shown that the radioactivity of [^{18}F]FDG partitions into two major fractions. About 75% of the fluorine-18 activity remains in tissues and is eliminated with a half-life of 110 minutes, presumably by decaying in place to O-18 to form [^{18}O]O-glucose-6-phosphate, which is non-radioactive (this molecule can soon be metabolized to carbon dioxide and water, after nuclear transmutation of the fluorine to oxygen ceases to prevent metabolism). Another fraction of [^{18}F]FDG, representing about 20% of the total fluorine-18 activity of an injection, is excreted renally by two hours after a dose of [^{18}F]FDG, with a rapid half-life of about 16 minutes (this portion makes the renal-collecting system and bladder prominent in a normal PET scan). This short biological half-life indicates that this 20% portion of the total fluorine-18 tracer activity is eliminated renally much more quickly than the isotope itself can decay. Unlike normal glucose, FDG is not fully reabsorbed by the kidney. Because of this rapidly excreted urine ^{18}F, the urine of a patient undergoing a PET scan may therefore be especially radioactive for several hours after administration of the isotope.

All radioactivity of [^{18}F]FDG, both the 20% which is rapidly excreted in the first several hours of urine which is made after the exam, and the 80% which remains in the patient, decays with a half-life of 110 minutes (just under two hours). Thus, within 24 hours (13 half-lives after the injection), the radioactivity in the patient and in any initially voided urine which may have contaminated bedding or objects after the PET exam will have decayed to 2^{−13} = 1/8192 of the initial radioactivity of the dose. In practice, patients who have been injected with [^{18}F]FDG are told to avoid the close vicinity of especially radiation-sensitive persons, such as infants, children and pregnant women, for at least 12 hours (7 half-lives, or decay to 1/128 the initial radioactive dose).

== Production ==
Alliance Medical and Siemens Healthcare are the only producers in the United Kingdom. A dose of FDG in England costs about £130. In Northern Ireland, where there is a single supplier, doses cost up to £450. IBA Molecular North America and Zevacor Molecular, both of which are owned by Illinois Health and Science (IBAM having been purchased as of 1 August 2015), Siemens' PETNET Solutions (a subsidiary of Siemens Healthcare), and Cardinal Health are producers in the U.S.

== Distribution ==
The labeled [^{18}F]FDG compound has a relatively short shelf life which is determined largely by the physical decay of fluorine-18 with a half-life of 109.8 minutes, or slightly less than two hours. Still, this half-life is sufficiently long to allow shipping the compound to remote PET scanning facilities, in contrast to other medical radioisotopes like carbon-11 with a half-life of ~20 minutes. Due to transport regulations for radioactive compounds, delivery is normally done by specially licensed road transport, but means of transport may also include dedicated small commercial jet services. Transport by air allows expanding the distribution area around a [^{18}F]FDG production site to deliver the compound to PET scanning centres within a 1–3-hour flight time.

Recently, on-site cyclotrons with integral shielding and portable chemistry stations for making [^{18}F]FDG have accompanied PET scanners to remote hospitals. This technology holds some promise in the future, for replacing some of the scramble to transport [^{18}F]FDG from site of manufacture to site of use.

== Applications ==
Whole-body PET scan using ^{18}F-FDG to show liver metastases of a colorectal tumor

In PET imaging, [^{18}F]FDG is primarily used for imaging tumors in oncology, where a static [^{18}F]FDG PET scan is performed and the tumor [^{18}F]FDG uptake is analyzed in terms of Standardized Uptake Value (SUV). FDG PET/CT can be used for the assessment of glucose metabolism in the heart and the brain. [^{18}F]FDG is taken up by cells, and subsequently phosphorylated by hexokinase (whose mitochondrial form is greatly elevated in rapidly growing malignant tumours). Phosphorylated [^{18}F]FDG cannot be further metabolised and is thus retained by tissues with high metabolic activity, such as most types of malignant tumours. As a result, FDG-PET can be used for diagnosis, staging, and monitoring treatment of cancers, particularly in Hodgkin's disease, non-Hodgkin lymphoma, colorectal cancer, breast cancer, melanoma, and lung cancer. It has also been approved for use in diagnosing Alzheimer's disease.

In body-scanning applications in searching for tumor or metastatic disease, a dose of [^{18}F]-FDG in solution (typically 5 to 10 millicuries or 200 to 400 MBq) is typically injected rapidly into a saline drip running into a vein, in a patient who has been fasting for at least six hours, and who has a suitably low blood sugar. (This is a problem for some diabetics; usually PET scanning centers will not administer the isotope to patients with blood glucose levels over about 180 mg/dL = 10 mmol/L, and such patients must be rescheduled). The patient must then wait about an hour for the sugar to distribute and be taken up into organs which use glucose – a time during which physical activity must be kept to a minimum, in order to minimize uptake of the radioactive sugar into muscles (this causes unwanted artifacts in the scan, interfering with reading especially when the organs of interest are inside the body vs. inside the skull). Then, the patient is placed in the PET scanner for a series of one or more scans which may take from 20 minutes to as long as an hour (often, only about one-quarter of the body length may be imaged at a time).
