= Whaler (surname) =

Whaler is a surname. Notable people with the surname include:

- Kathryn Whaler (born 1956), British professor
- Sean Whaler (born 2000), English footballer

== See also ==
- Whale (surname)
- Whalen
- Whaley (surname)
