= Freya Waley-Cohen =

British-American composer

Freya Waley-Cohen (born 20 February 1989) is a British-American composer based in London.

== Biography ==
Waley-Cohen grew up in an arts-oriented family. Her mother is the American sculptor Josie Spencer and her father is English theatre manager and producer Stephen Waley-Cohen. Her sister is the violinist Tamsin Waley-Cohen. She began playing the violin at the age of three, and at aged 11 enrolled for a composition course at The Walden School, New Hampshire. She studied with Giles Swayne whilst an undergraduate at Cambridge, and then afterwards with Simon Bainbridge and Oliver Knussen at the Royal Academy of Music. In 2016 she was a Composition Fellow at the Tanglewood Festival.

== Music ==
An early composition was Dark Hour, a piano quintet with clarinet, performed at the Sage Gateshead in May 2013. The choral piece Linea was written specifically for performance inside the Princess of Wales Conservatory glass house at Kew Gardens, an installation as much as a concert piece. It was performed there by the vocal ensemble Reverie in October 2014. Similarly Permutations (2017), for six recorded violins, is also site-specific. It was written to be performed inside a specially constructed building at the Aldeburgh Festival, created with architectural designers Finbarr O’Dempsey and Andrew Skulina. The six violin parts were recorded separately and the sound distributed around the building.

The song cycle Happiness for soprano and orchestra was the last piece Waley-Cohen worked on with her teacher Oliver Knussen before his death in July 2018. It premiered at St Luke Old Street on 19 October 2018, played by the London Symphony Orchestra with soloist Lauren Fagan. Ink for large ensemble, recorded by the Philharmonia Orchestra on the NMC label, was inspired by the poetry collection Bottled Air by Caleb Klaces (who also provided the text for Linea). Changeling, a 10-minute work for chamber orchestra, was commissioned by the Los Angeles Philharmonic and premiered on 1 June 2019 by the LA Phil New Music Group at the Walt Disney Concert Hall, conducted by John Adams.

Her BBC Proms debut came with a performance of the octet Naiad at Cadogan Hall by the Knussen Chamber Orchestra, led by Ryan Wigglesworth, on 9 September 2019. Conjure, a string trio, was commissioned by the Wigmore Hall and given its first performance at the hall on 2 November 2019 by the Albion Quartet. Spell Book for soloists and chamber orchestra, setting poems from Rebecca Tamás’s 2019 collection WITCH, was commissioned by the Britten Sinfonia and first performed on 21 January 2020 in Cambridge. Spell Book (Volume 2) was premiered at Conway Hall on 1 March 2020. The complete cycle, eight songs lasting around 45 minutes, was given its premiere at Milton Court in London on 1 February 2024. Spell Book has been recorded, along with Conjure, Naiad and Talisman (2020, for string ensemble).

In March 2022 the premiere of her hour-long opera WITCH (also setting Rebecca Tamás) took place at the Royal Academy of Music as part of its 200th anniversary celebrations. Waley-Cohen was composer in residence with the London Chamber Orchestra for the 2021-22 season, where performances of her works included Saffron and Happiness as well as the new work Pocket Cosmos, written for the orchestra.

Further works for full orchestra have followed. Demon (2023), co-commissioned by the City of Birmingham Symphony Orchestra and the Royal Stockholm Philharmonic Orchestra, was premiered at Birmingham Symphony Hall on 22 February 2023, conducted by Ilan Volkov. The 25 minute orchestral work Mother Tongue, commissioned by the London Philharmonic Orchestra, was premiered at the Royal Festival Hall in November 2024, conducted by Edward Gardner.

== Works ==
=== Stage ===
- WITCH (2022), opera

=== Orchestral ===
- Ignite (2013), orchestra
- Magpie (2016), small orchestra
- Saffron (2016), small orchestra
- Bandstand (2017), orchestra
- Changeling (2019), chamber orchestra
- Talisman (2020), for String Ensemble
- Pocket Cosmos (2022), orchestra
- Demon (2023), orchestra (fp. 22 February, Birmingham)
- Variation on Sellinger's Round (2023), solo recorder and string orchestra
- Mother Tongue (2024) (for the London Philharmonic Orchestra, 6 November 2024)

=== Chamber/Instrumental ===
- Ascension (2012), solo cello
- A Pyrrhic Smile (2012), violin and cello
- Five Breaths (2013), solo piano
- Day Three (2013), flute, saxophone, harp and string quartet
- Dark Hour (2013), clarinet, piano & string quartet
- Sillage (2013), ensemble and solo violin
- Regen (2013), flute, clarinet, piano and string trio
- Fragments (2013), violin and guitar
- Southern Leaves (2014), solo piano
- Tree Rings (2014), organ and percussion trio
- Stella (2014), brass ensemble
- Daphna (2014), horn trio
- Just so we can Dance (2014), accordion, clarinet and string trio
- Glass (2015), percussion quartet
- Nocturne (2015), solo clarinet
- Unveil (2015), solo violin
- Sunstone (2015), horn octet
- Unbridling (2016), viola da gamba
- BluTack for Sophie (2016), solo harp
- Blu-Tack (2016), harp and viola
- Sardine (2016), cello and piano
- Wing (2016), violin duet
- Likeness (2016), six violins
- Skye (2017), solo harp
- Snap Dragon, string quartet
- Vitae (2017), string quartet
- Permutations (2017), six recorded violins
- Vita (2017), string quartet
- Blu-Tack (2017), vibraphone and clarinet
- Ink (2018), large mixed ensemble
- Isle (2018), solo piano
- Water (2018), accordion and cello
- Naiad (2019), octet
- Winterbourne (2019), string quartet
- Dust (2019), string quartet
- Wake (2019), clarinet, viola da gamba, cello
- Caffeine (2019), recorder
- Conjure (2019), string trio
- Amulet (2020), for string quintet
- Amulet (2021), for guitar
- Bad Habit (2021), piano
- Caffeine (2021), caprice for violin
- for Simon (2022), piano
- Glass Flowers (2023), flute trio
- Stone Fruit (2024), for percussion ensemble

=== Vocal/Choral ===
- In the Bubble Gum Jungle (2013), soprano & piano
- Linea - Pleasure Trip (2014), vocal ensemble (text Caleb Klaces)
- To Declare (2014), baritone or tenor & piano
- Landay (2015), piano and voice
- Oyster (2015), soprano, clarinet, harp & double bass
- Attired with Stars (2015), choir and audience
- Little Poisonous Snakes (2015), soprano, piano, oboe, cello
- We Phoenician Sailors (2016), soprano, harp, clarinet, double bass (text Octavia Bright)
- The Rope and Glass Between Us (2016), vocal ensemble
- Happiness (2018), song cycle for soprano and orchestra
- Lend us your Voice (2019), choral, written for the King's Singers
- Once (2019), choir and audience
- Spell Book (Volume 1) (2020), mezzo-soprano and chamber orchestra
- Spell Book (Volume 2) (2020), soprano and string quartet
- Spell for reality (2020), soprano and ensemble
- The Moon, The Moss & The Mushrooms (2024), voice and piano
