= Westminster Children's Hospital =

Former hospital in London

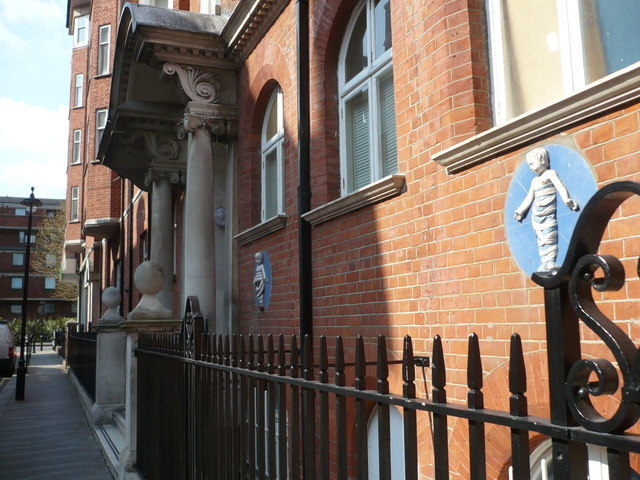
- Westminster Children's Hospital

- Shown in Westminster

Geography
- Location: Vincent Square, London, England
- Coordinates: 51.4925°N 0.1366°W

Organisation
- Care system: NHS England
- Type: NHS
- Affiliated university: Imperial College London

History
- Founded: 1903
- Closed: 1995

Links
- Lists: Hospitals in England

The Westminster Children's Hospital was a health facility in Westminster, Greater London.

== History ==
The hospital had its origins in the St Francis Hospital for Infants which was founded by Dr Ralph Vincent in a house in Denning Road, Hampstead in 1903. The Duchess of Teck became President of the hospital but was unable to carry out the opening ceremony on the 15 July 1903 which was performed by the Duchess of Portland. At the time of the opening the Hospital already had 25 child patients.

It was renamed The Infants Hospital in 1904 and it moved to purpose-built accommodation in Vincent Square in 1907. The Duchess of Albany had laid a memorial stone in May 1907 and she returned on 20 November 1907 to formally open the new building which had wards for 50 children. The building and equipping of the hospital had been paid for by Sir Robert Mond as a memorial to his late wife.

An outpatients department was opened by the Duchess of Albany in 1914 and it joined the National Health Service as the Westminster Children's Hospital in 1948. After services were transferred to the Chelsea and Westminster Hospital, the Westminster Children's Hospital closed in 1995. The building has since been converted to luxury apartments.
