= Brown Advisory =

Asset management firm headquartered in Baltimore

Brown Advisory LLC
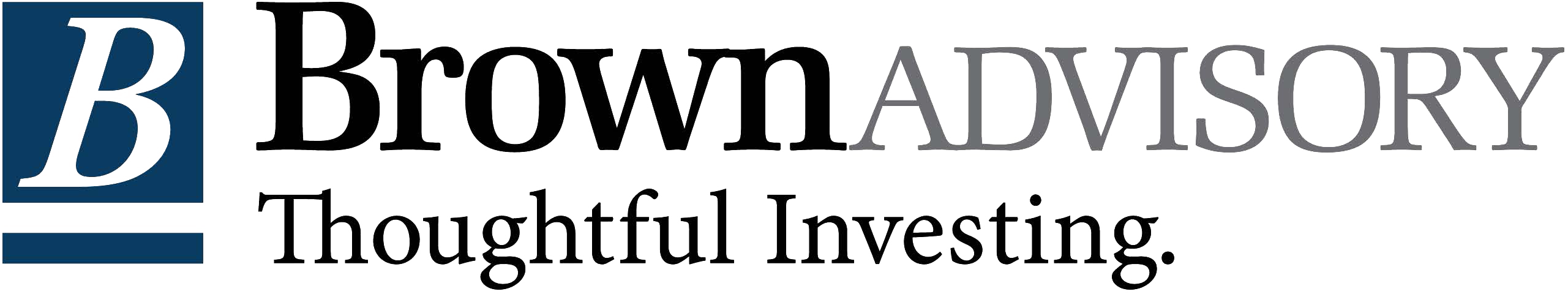
- Type: Private
- Industry: Investment Management
- Founded: 1993; 33 years ago
- Headquarters: Baltimore, Maryland, U.S.
- Key people: Michael Hankin (Co-CEO & Partner), Logie Fitzwilliams (Co-CEO & Partner)
- AUM: US$173.5 billion (31 December 2025)
- Number of employees: ~1000 (2025)
- Website: www.brownadvisory.com

Brown Advisory LLC is an American investment management firm based in Baltimore, Maryland. It was originally the investment management arm of Alex. Brown & Sons, the first investment bank in the United States. The firm is majority employee-owned.

== Background ==
Brown Advisory traces its origins to Alex. Brown & Sons, an investment bank headquartered in Baltimore, Maryland that was the first investment bank in the United States. In 1974, Alex. Brown Investment Management (ABIM) was established as the investment management unit of Alex. Brown & Sons where it managed assets and distributed mutual funds. In 1993, Brown Advisory was established as another investment management unit of Alex. Brown & Sons where it aimed to provide investment guidance to high-net-worth individuals and focused on financing growth companies. When Alex. Brown & Sons was acquired by Bankers Trust, both units continued to operate under it.

In 1998, the management team of Brown Advisory led a management buyout leading to Brown Advisory being spun off from Bankers Trust as an independent firm. At the time, it had $2.5 billion in assets under management (AUM). Not too long after, Bankers Trust was acquired by Deutsche Bank in 1999. In 2001, the management team of ABIM lead a management buyout leading ABIM to being spun-off as an independent firm from Deutsche Bank.

In July 2007, Brown Advisory acquired Beaty Haynes & Associates, a $1.1 billion investment manager based in Bethesda.

On March 25, 2008, Brown Advisory expanded outside the US, where it opened an office in London as the base for its European operation. It would initially offer a US large-cap value portfolio to UK clients through a UCITS vehicle based in Dublin.

On July 7, 2008, Brown Advisory and ABIM agreed to a merger under the Brown Advisory brand name. The combined firm at the time would have $18 billion AUM.

In September 2016, Brown Advisory acquired Blackhaw Wealth Management, a small investment company in Austin, Texas.

In 2018, Brown Advisory made a series of acquisitions. On February 22, it acquired NextGen Venture Partners, a venture capital firm based in Washington, D.C. On March 28, it acquired Meritage Capital, a $1.2 billion hedge fund solutions provider based in Austin, Texas. On November 16, it acquired Signature Family Wealth Advisor, a $4.3 billion family office advisory firm based in Norfolk, Virginia.

In April 2019, Brown Advisory expanded into the Asia-Pacific region after opening an office in Singapore.

In February 2021, Brown Advisory and Meriebelle Stable took over from RSA Insurance Group as a sponsor of the Brown Advisory Novices' Chase.

In May 2023, Governor of Maryland, Wes Moore, put $2.5 million worth of investments in a blind trust, which was reported to be managed by Brown Advisory. Under the structure of the trust, Brown Advisory had 90 days to reduce the holdings of Cannabis company, Thumb Industries, from 46 percent to less than 20 percent of the trust's assets.
