= The Wailers (disambiguation) =

The Wailers, or Bob Marley and the Wailers, were a Jamaican reggae group from 1963 to 1981.

The Wailers may also refer to:

- The Wailers Band, a reggae band formed in 1981, after Marley's death
- The Original Wailers, a reggae group formed in 2008 by Al Anderson and Junior Marvin
- The Fabulous Wailers, or the Wailers, an American rock band active from 1958 to 1969
