= Sam Waley-Cohen =

English National Hunt jockey (born 1982)

Personal information
- Born: 15 April 1982 (age 44) Westminster, London, England

Horse racing career
- Sport: Horse racing

Major racing wins
- King George VI Chase 2011; Cheltenham Gold Cup 2011; Grand National 2022

Significant horses
- Long Run; Noble Yeats

Sam Bernard Waley-Cohen (born 15 April 1982) is an English entrepreneur and retired amateur National Hunt jockey.

== Horse racing ==
Waley-Cohen was reported in the sports pages in 2007 when he came 5th on his father's horse Liberthine in the Grand National. He won the delayed 2010 King George VI Chase in January 2011 on Long Run, preventing Kauto Star from winning the race for a record fifth consecutive year.

In 2011 Waley-Cohen also won the Cheltenham Gold Cup on Long Run. He is the first amateur jockey in 30 years to win the race. In the 2012 and 2013 runnings they finished third to Synchronised and Bobs Worth respectively.

In 2022 Waley-Cohen announced that he would be retiring and that his 2022 Grand National ride on Noble Yeats would be his last. He went on to win the race with final odds at 50/1. Waley-Cohen became the first amateur jockey to win the Grand National since Marcus Armytage on Mr Frisk in 1990. Having also finished second in the 2011 Grand National on Oscar Time, and won seven races on the Grand National course from 41 rides, this made him the most successful course jockey of the modern era.

== Business interests ==
Waley-Cohen started his career at Louis Dreyfus Trading Ltd in London, spending time with the successful sugar trading division. Waley-Cohen has also built up the Portman Dentalcare chain of dental practices since he started the business in 2009. By March 2011 the business had grown to eight dental practices employing 170 staff and by 2013 it has grown to 15 dental practices. His business activities saw him nominated as Spears young entrepreneur of the year in 2011.

In 2020 the Portman Group had grown to over 160 practices and expanded to operate across Europe. In 2023 Portman acquired Dentex Health. When combined they will operate more than 350 practices, with 2,000 clinicians and 4,000 employees, providing dental care for over 1.5 million patients per year. The move will also make them one of Europe's largest dental care platforms, operating in five European countries.

== Personal life ==
Waley-Cohen is the son of Felicity Ann (Samuel) and businessman, racehorse breeder and trainer Robert Waley-Cohen, nephew of the theatre owner and producer Sir Stephen Waley-Cohen Bt. Joanna Waley-Cohen, provost at NYU Shanghai, and collegiate professor and professor of history in the NYU History Department in New York and grandson of Lord Mayor of London, Sir Bernard Waley-Cohen. The founder of Shell Oil -Marcus Samuel, 1st Viscount Bearsted- was his great-great-grandfather. Waley-Cohen was educated at Dragon School and St Edward's School, Oxford followed by the University of Edinburgh.

Waley-Cohen married Annabel Ballin in 2012.

== Charity links ==
Waley-Cohen is a celebrity ambassador for The Bone Cancer Research Trust (BCRT). He is also a trustee of the Injured Jockeys Fund, and founder of the TAWC Fund.
