= 1940 Grand National =

Horse race held in 1940

- Grand National
- Location: Aintree
- Date: 5 April 1940
- Winning horse: Bogskar
- Starting price: 25/1
- Jockey: Sgt. Mervyn A. Jones
- Trainer: Lord Stalbridge
- Owner: Lord Stalbridge
- Conditions: Good to firm

External videos
- Highlights of the 1940 Grand National (British Pathé)

The 1940 Grand National was the 99th renewal of the Grand National horse race that took place at Aintree near Liverpool, England, on 5 April 1940.

Thirty horses ran in the steeplechase, which was won by Bogskar, a 25/1 shot ridden by Royal Air Force sergeant Mervyn Jones. MacMoffat finished in second place, Gold Arrow was third, and Symaethis fourth.

It was the last true Aintree Grand National before a five-year break due to World War II.

== Finishing order ==
Position	Name	Jockey	Age	Handicap (st-lb)	SP	Distance
01	Bogskar	Mervyn Jones	7	10-4	25/1	4 lengths
02	MacMoffat	Ian Alder	8	10-10	6 Lengths	
03	Gold Arrow	Percy (Ben) Lay	8	10-3		
04	Symaethis	Matthew Feakes	8	10-7		
05	Venturesome Knight	Reg Tweedie	10	10-8		
06	The Professor	George Owen	9	11-8		
07	Takvor Pacha	Otho Prior-Palmer	8	10-4		
08	Away	Ian 'Kim' Muir	9	11-13		
09	Inversable	Matt Hogan	12	10-6		
10	Dominick's Cross	Cyril Mitchell	9	11-1		
11	Luxborough	Eric Brown	6	10-3		
12	Kilstar	George Archibald	9	11-0		
13	Rockquilla	Thomas F Carey	10	11-5		
14	Downright	James Seely	11	10-3		
15	Lazy Boots	James Ward	14	10-3		
16	Red Eagle	Tommy Elder	9	11-2		
17	Tuckmill	Glen Kelly	10	10-3		

== Non-finishers ==
Position/Fate	Name	Jockey	Age	Handicap (st-lb)	SP
Fell (29th)	Royal Danieli	Dan Moore	9	11-13	
Fell (13th)	Dunhill Castle	Gerry Wilson	10	11-5	
	Black Hawk	Fred Rimell	9	11-0	
	Knightsbrook	?	?	10-9	
	Milano	Danny Morgan	9	10-9	
	Litigant	Richard 'Dicky' Black	9	10-7	
	Le Cygne	WT O'Grady	7	10-7	
	Boyo	Richard Morgan	9	10-4	
Fell (14th)	National Knight	Hywel Jones	8	10-4	
	Red Freeman	Bill Redmond	9	10-3	
	Underbid	Frenchie Nicholson	8	10-3	
	Batchelor Prince	Mr R Loewenstein	13	10-3	
	Second Act	Jack Dowdeswell	9	10-3	
	Sterling Duke	Tim Hyde	9	10-3	
	Corn Law	Thomas McNeill	8	10-3	
