= Joanna Waley-Cohen =

English academic historian (born 1952)

Eleanor Joanna Waley-Cohen (born 10 June 1952) is an English academic who is Silver Professor of History at New York University, where she has taught Chinese history since 1992. She served as Provost of New York University Shanghai from 2014 to 2025, the University's chief academic officer, setting the university's academic strategy and priorities, and overseeing academic appointments, research, and faculty affairs.

Her research interests include early modern Chinese history, especially the Qing dynasty; China and the West; and Chinese imperial culture, especially in the Qianlong era; warfare in China and Inner Asia; Chinese culinary history.

== Early life ==
Waley-Cohen was born in 1952 at Westminster Hospital in London, the daughter of Sir Bernard Waley-Cohen, Baronet and Hon. Joyce Nathan. She was born into a prominent Anglo-Jewish family, the granddaughter of Sir Robert Waley Cohen and Lord Nathan.

== Career ==
Waley-Cohen received her B.A. and M.A. degrees in Chinese Studies from Cambridge University, then took a degree in law. When she moved with her husband to the United States, she could not practice law, and enrolled in the Ph.D. program at Yale University, receiving her degree in 1987.

Waley-Cohen's books include The Culture of War in China: Empire and the Military under the Qing Dynasty (I.B. Tauris, 2006); The Sextants of Beijing: Global Currents in Chinese History (W.W. Norton, 1999); and Exile in Mid-Qing China: Banishment to Xinjiang, 1758-1820 (Yale University Press, 1991). Her current scholarly projects include a revised history of imperialism in China, a study of daily life in China c.1800, and a history of culinary culture in early modern China.

== Influence and reception ==
Nicholas D. Kristof welcomed Sextants in the New York Times as "sensibly organized and engagingly told" but "In the end, I disagreed with much of the thesis of this book, but that is not to say that I disliked it. On the contrary, I probably liked it more for disagreeing with it. Partly because of the boldness of the argument, it is stimulating and refreshing..."

Her 2003 article "New Qing History" summarized American revisionist scholarship in history of the Qing dynasty and gave it the name New Qing History which has come into widespread use.

== Bibliography ==
- Waley-Cohen, Joanna (2007). "Celebrated Cooks of China's Past". Flavor & Fortune. 14 (4): 5–7, 24. Archived from the original on 2 April 2015.
- The Culture of War in China; Empire and Military in the Eighteenth Century (London: IB Tauris, 2006)
- 'Chinese Taste' in Food: A History of Taste, ed. Paul Freedman (London: Thames and Hudson, 2006)
- 'The New Qing History' in Radical History Review, Winter 2003
- 'Military Ritual and the Qing Empire' in N. di Cosmo, ed., Warfare in Inner Asian History (Leiden: E. J. Brill, 2002) 405–444
- The Sextants of Beijing: Global Currents in Chinese History (New York and London: W. W. Norton, 1999; paperback, 2000; French translation 2002)
- 'War and Empire-Building in Eighteenth-Century China' in International History Review (special issue on Manchu imperialism) XX. 3 (June 1998), 336–352
- 'A Brief History of Hong Kong', in Picturing Hong Kong, 1842-1910 (New York: Asia Society, 1997), 15–26
- Commemorating War in Eighteenth-Century China (Modern Asian Studies 30.4)
- 'China and Western Technology in the Late Eighteenth Century' in American Historical Review 98.5 (December 1993) 1525–1544
- Exile in Mid-Qing China: Banishment to Xinjiang, 1758-1820 (New Haven, Yale University Press, 1991)
