= Stephen Waley-Cohen =

English theatre producer (b. 1946)

Sir Stephen Waley-Cohen Bt
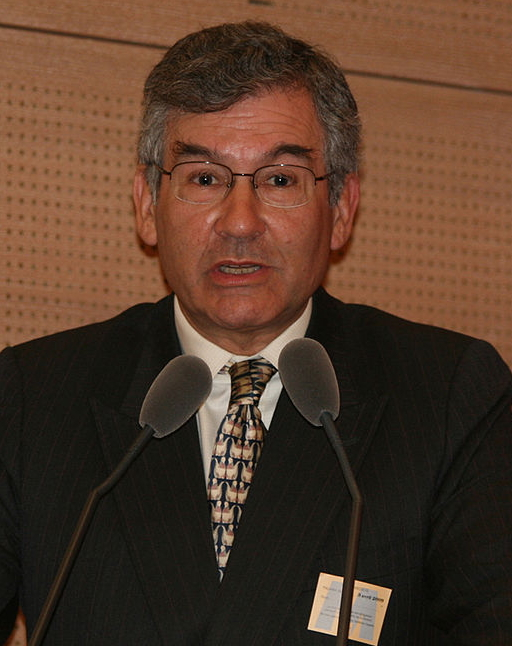
- Photo taken on 3 April 2009.
- Born: Stephen Harry Waley-Cohen; 22 June 1946 (age 80); Westminster, London, England
- Education: Eton and Magdalene College, Cambridge.
- Occupation: Theatre producer
- Spouse(s): Pamela Doniger (m. div.); Josie Spencer (m.)
- Children: 5, including Freya Waley-Cohen and Jack Waley-Cohen
- Father: Bernard Waley-Cohen
- Relatives: Sam Waley-Cohen (nephew), Edward Mattinson, Youth MP for East Hampshire (grandson)

Sir Stephen Harry Waley-Cohen, 2nd Baronet (born 22 June 1946) is an English theatre owner-manager and producer, following a career as a businessman and financial journalist. He manages the St. Martin's Theatre in London's West End and is the current producer of the world's longest running play The Mousetrap. He was chairman of the Royal Academy of Dramatic Art (RADA) Council.

== Career ==
=== Business ===
Waley-Cohen was a financial journalist, at the Daily Mail from 1968 to 1973, and a founder director and publisher at Euromoney Publications (which later became Euromoney Institutional Investor PLC) from 1969 to 1983.

He was involved with the insurance business, including as chairman of Willis Faber & Dumas (Agencies) (part of what became the Willis Group) from 1992 to 1999, director of the Stewart Wrightson Members Agency Ltd 1987 to 1998 and chairman of Policy Portfolio plc from 1993 to 1998.

He was chairman of First Call Group plc from 1996 to 1998 and of Portsmouth & Sunderland Newspaper plc from 1998 to 1999. He was a director of Exeter Preferred Capital Investment Trust plc 1992–2003.

=== Theatre ===
Waley-Cohen has been a theatre owner and manager since 1984 when he was Joint Chief Executive of Maybox Group, which managed the Albery (now named the Noël Coward), Criterion, Donmar Warehouse, Piccadilly, Whitehall (now Trafalgar Studios) and Wyndham's theatres, until it was sold in 1989.

In 1989 he became managing director of the Victoria Palace Theatre, and took on the management of the St. Martin's Theatre. He managed the Vaudeville Theatre from 1996 to 2001 and the Savoy from 1997 to 2005. In April 2007 he took over the Ambassadors Theatre. In 2014, he sold the Victoria Palace to Delfont Mackintosh Theatres.

He became the producer of The Mousetrap in 1994. During his time managing the St. Martin's Theatre, he had got to know The Mousetrap's producer, Peter Saunders. Waley-Cohen said, "When [Saunders] wanted to retire at the age of 80, he picked up the phone to me". Mousetrap Productions, of which Waley-Cohen is the sole director, is licensed to produce the play by Mathew Prichard, Agatha Christie's grandson, to whom she gave the rights to The Mousetrap when he was nine.

In 1997, Waley-Cohen launched the education charity, Mousetrap Theatre Projects. The charity brings disadvantaged young people into the West End to experience theatre, and runs access, education and audience development programmes. The charity had taken over 100,000 young people to the theatre by 2012.

== Politics ==
Waley-Cohen stood unsuccessfully as the Conservative candidate in both the General Elections in 1974 for the Manchester Gorton constituency.

== Appointments and honours ==
Waley-Cohen was Chairman of the RADA Council until 2021 (a position to which he was elected in September 2007), and Chairman of RADA's Development Board. He was President of the Society of London Theatre from 2002 to 2005, having been a member since 1984 and a board member since 1993. He was a Trustee of The Theatres Trust from 1998 to 2004.

He is President of the JCA Charitable Foundation, which supports projects for education, agriculture and tourism in rural areas of Israel such as Galilee and the Negev. In 2011 he was awarded an honorary doctorate by the Ben-Gurion University of the Negev.

He was chairman of the British-American Project executive committee from 1989 to 92, and continued to have a role in its subsequent development.

He is currently a trustee of the Campaign for the Arts.

As a hereditary baronet, Waley-Cohen is styled Sir as part of his baronetcy – the title is not a knighthood.

== Personal life ==
Waley-Cohen has three children by his first marriage to Pamela Doniger, and two with American sculptor Josie Spencer. His nephew is the jockey Sam Waley-Cohen. His father, Bernard Waley-Cohen, was Lord Mayor of London, and his mother was educationalist and public servant Joyce Waley-Cohen.

== Arms ==
Coat of arms of Stephen Waley-Cohen

Crest
1st a buck's head couped Argent attired Or holding in the mouth a rose slipped Gules the neck encircled by a wreath of oak Proper between four barrulets Gules (Cohen); 2nd out of a bush of fern a hind's head Proper in the mouth a rose Argent stalked and leaved also Proper (Waley).
Escutcheon
Quarterly: 1st & 4th Argent on a chevron Gules cottised Azure between in chief two roses of the second barbed and seeded Proper and in base a buck's head couped also Proper three annulets Or (Cohen); 2nd & 3rd Argent a chevron Azure cottised Sable between in chief two eagles displayed of the last and in base on a mount Vert a hind trippant Proper (Waley).
Motto
All For The Best

Baronetage of the United Kingdom
Preceded by Bernard Waley-Cohen	Baronet (of Honeymead); 1991–present	Incumbent
