= Bernard Waley-Cohen =

British businessman and Lord Mayor of London

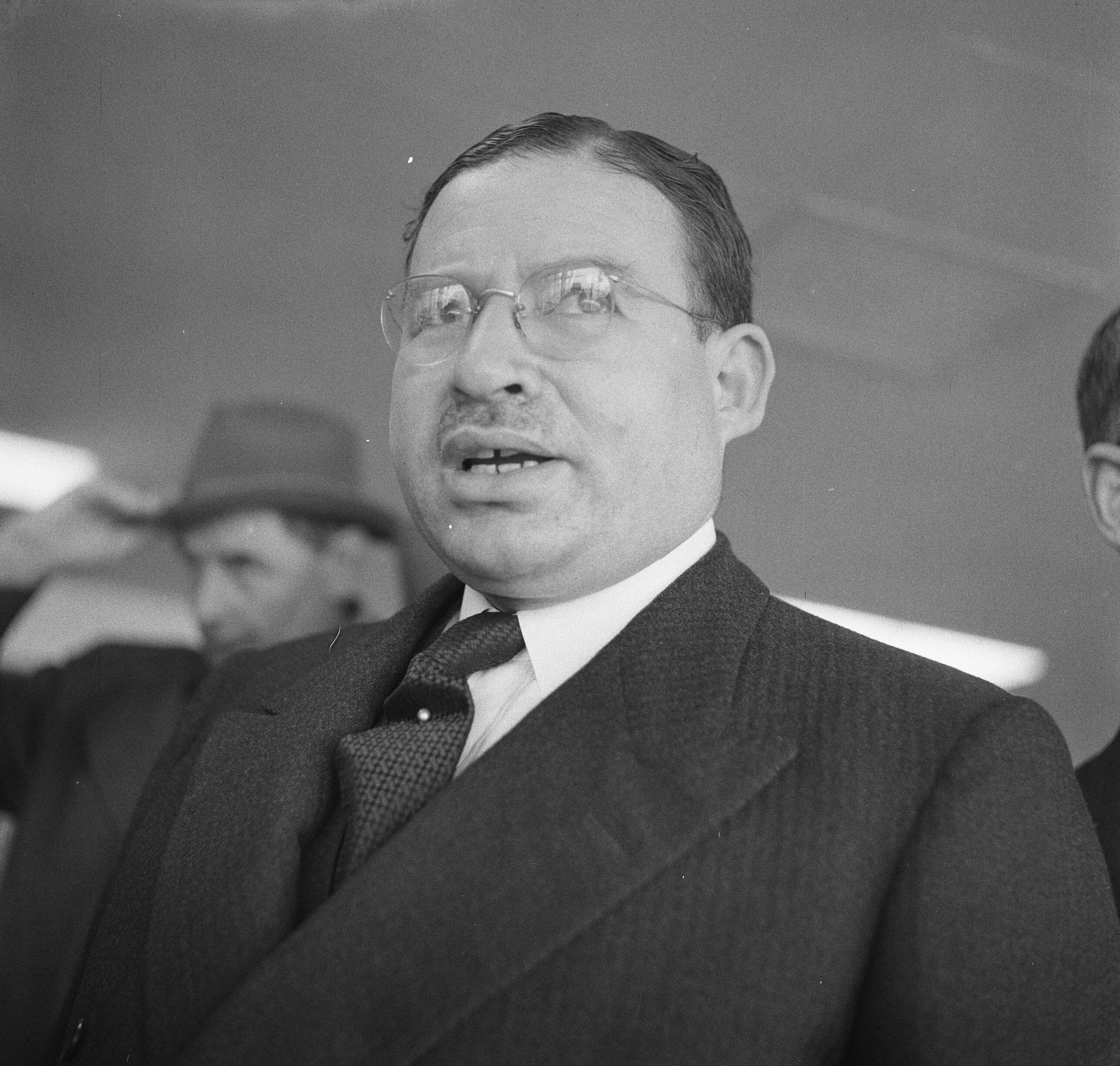
Bernard Waley-Cohen (1961)

Sir Bernard Nathaniel Waley-Cohen, 1st Baronet (29 May 1914 – 3 July 1991) was a British businessman. He was the 633rd Lord Mayor of London, elected in 1960.

== Biography ==
The son of Sir Robert Waley Cohen and Alice (née Beddington), Waley-Cohen was educated at Clifton College where he was a member of Polack's House. He was an Alderman of the City of London for Portsoken ward from 1949 to 1984; a Sheriff of London in 1955–56; Lord Mayor of London in 1960–61; and one of the Lieutenants, City of London, from 1949 to 1991. He was a director of the Palestine Corporation, founded in 1922 by a number of British businessmen to promote economic development in the British mandate of Palestine. Waley-Cohen was a member of the College Committee of University College London from 1953 to 1980 (being Treasurer in 1962–70, Vice-Chairman in 1970 and Chairman in 1971–80). In former times, as Alderman, he sometimes sat as sole Justice in the Mansion House Justice Room.

He was made a Knight Bachelor in 1957 and made a Baronet of Honeymead in the County of Somerset, in 1961.

Waley-Cohen married the Hon. Joyce Constance Ina (1920–2013), daughter of Harry Nathan, 1st Baron Nathan. They had four children:

- Rosalind Burdon (married to businessman and former New Zealand politician and Cabinet Minister, Hon Philip Burdon)
- Sir Stephen Waley-Cohen
- Joanna Waley-Cohen
- Robert Waley-Cohen

Their grandson (son of Robert) is the amateur jockey Sam Waley-Cohen who won the 2022 Grand National riding Noble Yeats, a 50/1 odds outsider; it was described as a fairytale win.

== Arms ==
Coat of arms of Bernard Waley-Cohen

Crest
1st a buck's head couped Argent attired Or holding in the mouth a rose slipped Gules the neck encircled by a wreath of oak Proper between four barrulets Gules (Cohen); 2nd out of a bush of fern a hind's head Proper in the mouth a rose Argent stalked and leaved also Proper (Waley).
Escutcheon
Quarterly: 1st & 4th Argent on a chevron Gules cottised Azure between in chief two roses of the second barbed and seeded Proper and in base a buck's head couped also Proper three annulets Or (Cohen); 2nd & 3rd Argent a chevron Azure cottised Sable between in chief two eagles displayed of the last and in base on a mount Vert a hind trippant Proper (Waley).
Motto
All for the Best

Baronetage of the United Kingdom
New creation	Baronet (of Honeymead); 1961–1991	Succeeded by Stephen Waley-Cohen
