= Jacob Waley =

English legal writer (1818–1873)

Jacob Waley (17 March 1818 – 19 June 1873), was an English legal writer.

== Early life ==
Waley, born in 1818, was the elder son of Solomon Jacob Waley (d. 1864) of Stockwell, and afterwards of 22 Devonshire Place, London, by his wife, Rachel Hort. His father was a slaveholder and co-owner of the Quintynes plantation in Saint John, Barbados. In 1829 he bought out his partner Isaac Levi and held ownership of 100 slaves. He received an award under the Slave Compensation Act 1837.

Waley was educated at Mr. Neumegen's school at Highgate, and University College, London, and he graduated B.A. from the University of London in 1839, taking the first place in both mathematics and classics. Simon Waley was his younger brother.

== Legal career ==
He was entered as a student at Lincoln's Inn on 3 November 1837, and was called to the bar on 21 November 1842. Only three Jews had been called to the bar previously, (Sir) Francis Henry Goldsmid being the first. Waley practised as an equity draftsman, and in time became recognised as one of the most learned conveyancers in the profession. Although conveyancers rarely appear in court, Waley was several times summoned in cases of particular difficulty relating to real property. He acted as conveyancing counsel for the Bedford estates, and, in conjunction with Thomas Cooke Wright and C. D. Wright, edited Davidson's Precedents and Forms in Conveyancing (London, 1855–65, 5 vols. 8vo). In 1867 he was nominated a member of the Royal Commission to consider the law on the transfer of real property, and he had a large share in framing the report on which was based the Lord Chancellor's bill passed in 1874. In 1870 he was appointed a conveyancing counsel of the court of chancery.

== Other interests ==
In addition to his mastery of his own subject, Waley had numerous other interests. He was known as a political economist, acting as examiner for the University of London, and in 1853–4 he was appointed professor of that subject at University College London. He held the post until 1865–6, when the pressure of other work compelled his resignation, and he received the title of Emeritus Professor. He was also, until his death, joint secretary of the Political Economy Club.

Waley was a prominent member of the Jewish community. In conjunction with Lionel Louis Cohen he organised the London synagogues into a corporate congregational alliance, known as the United Synagogue. On the formation of the Anglo-Jewish Association he was chosen as the first president, a post which lack of time compelled him later to resign. He was also president of the Jews' orphan asylum and a member of the council of the Jews' College, where he occasionally lectured. He promoted the Hebrew Literary Society, and assisted the organisation of the Jewish Board of Guardians. He took much interest in the treatment of Jews abroad, and in 1872 wrote a brief preface to Israel Davis's "Jews in Roumania", in which he remonstrated against the persecutions the Jews were suffering. He died in London on 19 June 1873, and was buried in West Ham cemetery. Waley married, on 28 July 1847, Matilda, third daughter of Joseph Salomons, by his wife Rebecca, sister of Sir Moses Haim Montefiore He left several children.
