= Robert Waley Cohen =

British industrialist (1877–1952)

Sir Robert Waley Cohen
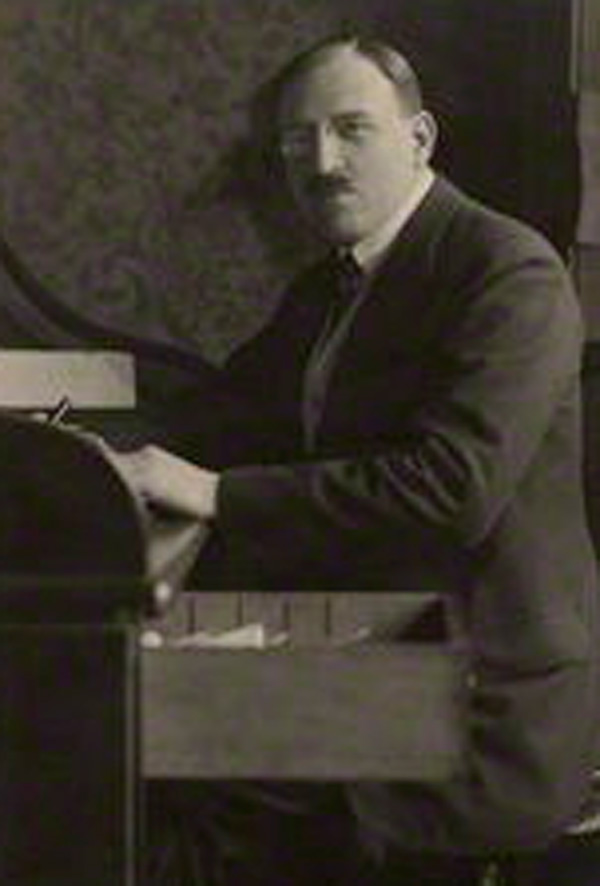
- Cohen, c. 1920
- Born: 8 September 1877
- Died: 27 November 1952 (aged 75); London, England, U.K.
- Education: Clifton College; Emmanuel College, Cambridge
- Occupation: Industrialist
- Years active: 1901–1931
- Known for: Anglo-Jewry leadership
- Spouse: Alice Violet Beddington (m. 1904; died 1935)
- Children: 3, including Bernard Waley-Cohen
- Relatives: Charles Waley Cohen (brother), Dorothea Waley Singer (sister)
- Awards: Knight Commander of the Most Excellent Order of the British Empire (KBE)

Sir Robert Waley Cohen, KBE (8 September 1877 – 27 November 1952) was a British industrialist and prominent leader of Anglo-Jewry.

== Early life ==
Robert Waley Cohen was born on 8 September 1877 to a prominent Jewish family. His father was Nathaniel Louis Cohen, a stock broker, and his mother was Julia Matilda Waley. Charles Waley Cohen, a soldier, barrister and Liberal Party politician was his brother, and Dorothea Waley Singer, a palaeographer and historian, was his sister. The English jurist and economist Jacob Waley was their maternal grandfather, while orientalist Arthur Waley was their cousin. Robert was educated at Clifton College and Emmanuel College, Cambridge.

== Career ==
Cohen joined the Shell Company, 1901 and negotiated its merger with the Royal Dutch Oil Company, 1906. He was a director of the merged company and chief assistant to its managing director.

Cohen was the petroleum adviser to the Army Council during World War I, for which he received a KBE, 1920. He retired from Shell in 1928 but became chairman of the African & Eastern Trade Corporation in 1929. He negotiated a merger with the Niger Company into the United Africa Company in 1929; he resigned in 1931.

Although he was generally opposed to Zionism, Cohen was the main creator of the Palestine Corporation, a conglomerate with various diverse business interests. He was vice-chairman of University College, London, and president of the United Synagogue.

As part of the preparations by Nazi Germany for the proposed invasion of Britain, Cohen was listed in "The Black Book" of prominent British residents to be arrested.

== Family life and residences ==
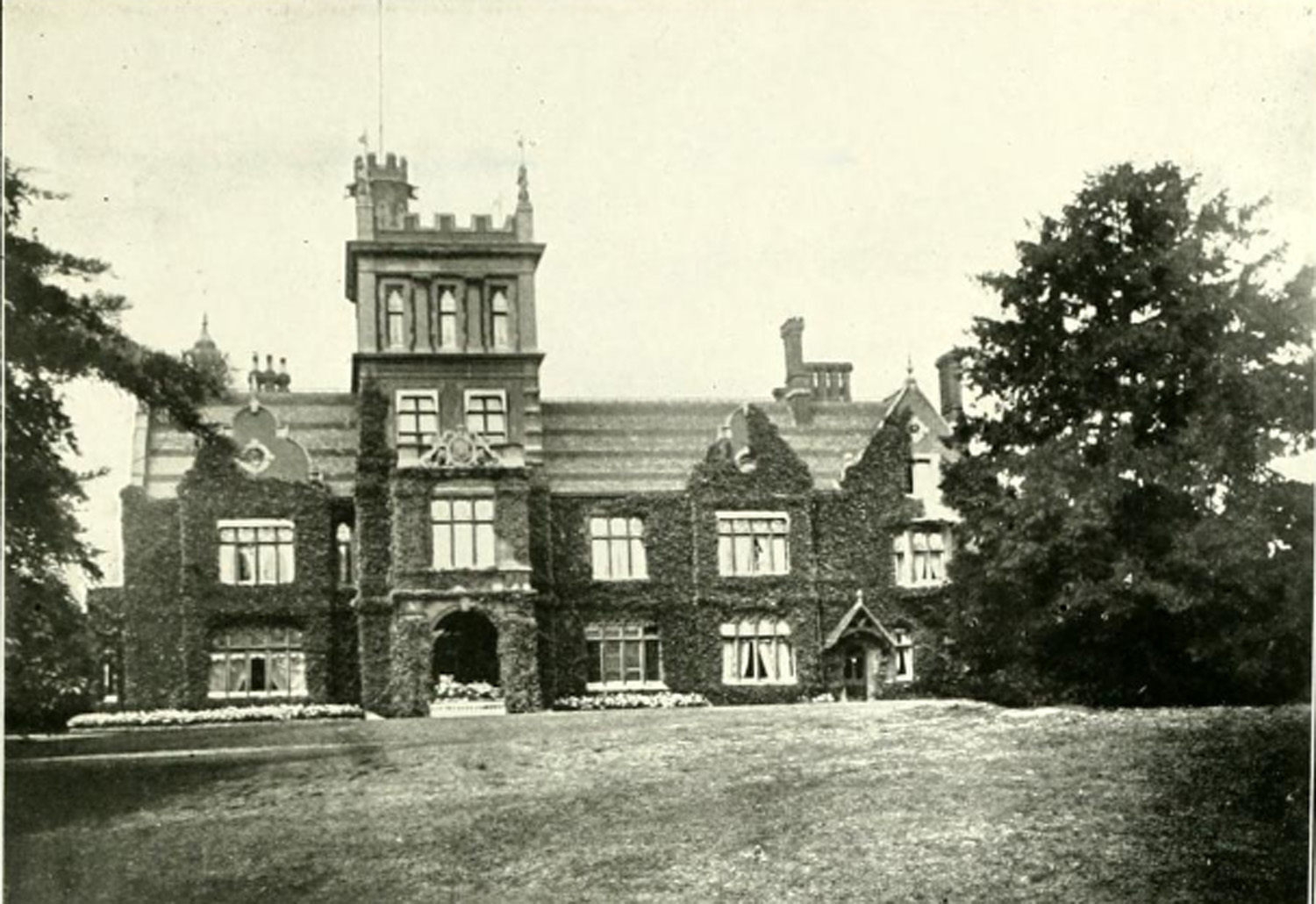
Caen Wood Towers, Highgate, London, c.1920, residence of Robert Waley Cohen between 1919 and 1942

In 1904, Cohen married Alice Violet Beddington; the couple had two sons and a daughter.

In 1919, Cohen bought Caen Wood Towers in the prestigious Highgate suburb of North London, where the family held numerous social events; Lady Waley Cohen often allowed the gardens to be used for fetes and parties for girls clubs and Boy Scouts, and for raising money for the less fortunate.

Lady Cohen died in 1935, but Sir Robert continued to live at Caen Wood Towers until about 1942 when it was taken over by the RAF and used as the Intelligence Training School.

In 1924, Cohen rented from Earl Fortescue the Somerset estate of Honeymead, Simonsbath, on the high moor in the centre of Exmoor. Honeymead was one of the earliest farmsteads built by John Knight soon after his purchase from the crown of the former largely uncultivated royal forest of Exmoor in 1818.

In 1927, Cohen purchased Honeymead with an estate of 1,745 acres (706 ha), including Winstitchen Allotment and Exe Cleave Allotment, together with the farmsteads of Pickedstones, Winstitchen and Red Deer (also known as Gallon House) and proceeded to introduce modern farming techniques.

In 1961, his son Bernard Waley-Cohen was created a baronet "of Honeymead in the county of Somerset". As of 2018, the estate was still owned by his descendants.

Cohen died on 27 November 1952, aged 75, at his Highgate home.

== Sources ==
- Dictionary of National Biography
- Who was Who
