= 1987 in sports =

1987 in sports describes the year's events in world sport.

== Alpine skiing ==
- Alpine Skiing World Cup
  - Men's overall season champion: Pirmin Zurbriggen, Switzerland
  - Women's overall season champion: Maria Walliser, Switzerland

== American football ==
- Super Bowl XXI – the New York Giants (NFC) won 39–20 over the Denver Broncos (AFC)
  - Location: Rose Bowl
  - Attendance: 101,063
  - MVP: Phil Simms, QB (New York)
- January 2 – Fiesta Bowl (1986 season):
  - The Penn State Nittany Lions won 14–10 over the Miami Hurricanes to win the national championship
- Arena football has its demonstration season—its first season— played with four teams.
- February 25 – The Southern Methodist University Mustangs football team becomes the first college football program to be given the death penalty by the NCAA Committee on Rules Infractions

== Artistic gymnastics ==
- World Artistic Gymnastics Championships –
  - Men's all-around champion: Dmitry Bilozerchev, USSR
  - Women's all-around champion: Aurelia Dobre, Romania
  - Men's team competition champion: USSR
  - Women's team competition champion: Romania

== Association football ==
- FA Cup final – Coventry City defeated Tottenham Hotspur 3–2
- Automatic relegation is introduced from the Football League, with Lincoln City F.C. relegated

== Australian rules football ==
- Victorian Football League
  - The West Coast Eagles and the Brisbane Bears join the league.
  - Carlton wins the 91st VFL Premiership (Carlton 15.14 (104) d Hawthorn 9.17 (71))
  - Brownlow Medal awarded to Tony Lockett (St Kilda) and John Platten (Hawthorn)

== Athletics ==
- August–September – 1987 World Championships in Athletics held in Rome

== Baseball ==
- January 14 – Catfish Hunter and Billy Williams are elected to the Baseball Hall of Fame. Hunter made his name as the ace of the Oakland A's staff in their championship years and made his fortune as one of the first free agents. Williams set a National League record by playing in 1,117 consecutive games and accumulating 426 home runs and a batting title.
- August 3 – Minnesota Twins pitcher Joe Niekro is suspended for 10 days for possessing a nail file on the pitcher's mound. Niekro claimed he had been filing his nails in the dugout and put the file in his back pocket when the inning started.
- World Series – Minnesota Twins won 4 games to 3 over the St. Louis Cardinals. The Series MVP was Frank Viola, Minnesota
  - Lowest regular-season record of any World Series champion (85–77, .525) until 2006 (Cardinals 83–78, .516)
  - First World Series game played indoors (Game 1 at the Hubert H. Humphrey Metrodome)
  - First World Series where the home team won every game

== Basketball ==
- NCAA Men's Basketball Championship –
  - Indiana won 74–73 over Syracuse
- NBA Finals –
  - Los Angeles Lakers won 4 games to 2 over the Boston Celtics
- National Basketball League (Australia) Finals:
  - Brisbane Bullets defeated the Perth Wildcats 2–0 in the best-of-three final series.

== Boxing ==
- March 7 in Las Vegas, Nevada, Mike Tyson adds the WBA heavyweight title to his WBC belt when he beats James Smith in a 12-round decision.
- April 6 – Sugar Ray Leonard beats Marvin Hagler for boxing's world Middleweight championship.

== Canadian football ==
- Grey Cup – Edmonton Eskimos won 38–36 over the Toronto Argonauts
- Vanier Cup – McGill Redmen won 47–11 over the UBC Thunderbirds

== Cricket ==
- 1987 Cricket World Cup – Final: Australia beat England by 7 runs

== Cycling ==
- Giro d'Italia won by Stephen Roche of Ireland
- Tour de France – Stephen Roche of Ireland
- UCI Road World Championships – Men's road race – Stephen Roche of Ireland

== Dogsled racing ==
- Iditarod Trail Sled Dog Race Champion –
  - Susan Butcher won with lead dogs: Granite & Mattie

== Field hockey ==
- Men's Champions Trophy won by West Germany
- Women's Champions Trophy won by the Netherlands
- Men's European Nations Cup won by the Netherlands
- Women's European Nations Cup won by the Netherlands

== Figure skating ==
- World Figure Skating Championship –
  - Men's champion: Brian Orser, Canada
  - Ladies' champion: Katarina Witt, Germany
  - Pair skating champions: Ekaterina Gordeeva / Sergei Grinkov, Soviet Union
  - Ice dancing champions: Natalia Bestemianova / Andrei Bukin, Soviet Union

== Gaelic Athletic Association ==
- Camogie
  - All-Ireland Camogie Champion: Kilkenny
  - National Camogie League: Kilkenny
- Gaelic football
  - All-Ireland Senior Football Championship – Meath 1–14 died Cork 0–11
  - National Football League – Dublin 1–11 died Kerry 0–11
- Ladies' Gaelic football
  - All-Ireland Senior Football Champion: Kerry
  - National Football League: Kerry
- Hurling
  - All-Ireland Senior Hurling Championship – Galway 1–12 died Kilkenny 0–9
  - National Hurling League – Galway 3–12 beat Clare 3–10

== Golf ==
Men's professional

- Masters Tournament – Larry Mize
- U.S. Open – Scott Simpson
- British Open – Nick Faldo
- PGA Championship – Larry Nelson
- PGA Tour money leader – Curtis Strange – $925,941
- Senior PGA Tour money leader – Chi Chi Rodriguez – $509,145
- Ryder Cup – Europe won 15–13 over the United States in team golf.

Men's amateur

- British Amateur – Paul Mayo
- U.S. Amateur – Billy Mayfair

Women's professional

- Nabisco Dinah Shore – Betsy King
- LPGA Championship – Jane Geddes
- U.S. Women's Open – Laura Davies
- Classique du Maurier Classic – Jody Rosenthal
- LPGA Tour money leader – Ayako Okamoto – $466,034

== Harness racing ==
- The North America Cup – Runnymede Lobell
- United States Pacing Triple Crown races –
  - – Cane Pace – Righteous Bucks
  - – Little Brown Jug – Jaguar Spur
  - – Messenger Stakes – Redskin
- United States Trotting Triple Crown races –
  - – Hambletonian – Mack Lobell
  - – Yonkers Trot – Mack Lobell
  - – Kentucky Futurity – Napoletano
- Australian Inter Dominion Harness Racing Championship –
  - Pacers: Lightning Blue
  - Trotters: Tussle

== Horse racing ==
Steeplechases

- Cheltenham Gold Cup – The Thinker
- Grand National – Maori Venture

Flat races

- Australia – Melbourne Cup won by Kensei
- Canada – Queen's Plate won by Market Control
- France – Prix de l'Arc de Triomphe won by Trempolino
- Ireland – Irish Derby Stakes won by Sir Harry Lewis
- Japan – Japan Cup won by Le Glorieux
- English Triple Crown Races:
  1. 2,000 Guineas Stakes – Don't Forget Me
  2. The Derby – Reference Point
  3. St. Leger Stakes – Reference Point
- United States Triple Crown Races:
  1. Kentucky Derby – Alysheba
  2. Preakness Stakes – Alysheba
  3. Belmont Stakes – Bet Twice
- Breeders' Cup World Thoroughbred Championships:
  1. Breeders' Cup Classic – Ferdinand
  2. Breeders' Cup Distaff – Sacahuista
  3. Breeders' Cup Juvenile – Success Express
  4. Breeders' Cup Juvenile Fillies – Epitome
  5. Breeders' Cup Mile – Miesque
  6. Breeders' Cup Sprint – Very Subtle
  7. Breeders' Cup Turf – Theatrical

== Ice hockey ==
- Art Ross Trophy as the NHL's leading scorer during the regular season: Wayne Gretzky, Edmonton Oilers
- Hart Memorial Trophy for the NHL's Most Valuable Player: Wayne Gretzky, Edmonton Oilers
- Stanley Cup – Edmonton Oilers won 4 games to 3 over the Philadelphia Flyers
- World Hockey Championship –
  - Men's champion: Sweden defeated the Soviet Union
  - Junior Men's champion: Finland defeated Czechoslovakia after a bench clearing brawl occurred between Canada and the Soviet Union

== Lacrosse ==
- Inaugural season of the Eagle Pro Box Lacrosse League (later the National Lacrosse League)
  - Championship won by the Baltimore Thunder

== Rugby league ==
- 1987 National Panasonic Cup
- 1987 NSWRL season
- 1987 New Zealand rugby league season
- 1986–87 Rugby Football League season / 1987–88 Rugby Football League season
- 1987 State of Origin series
- 1987 World Club Challenge
- 1985–1988 Rugby League World Cup

== Rugby union ==
- 93rd Five Nations Championship series is won by France who complete the Grand Slam
- Inaugural Rugby Union World Cup is held in Australia and New Zealand. The winners are New Zealand.

== Snooker ==
- World Snooker Championship – Steve Davis beats Joe Johnson 18–14
- World rankings – Steve Davis remains world number one for 1987/88

== Swimming ==
- Tenth Pan American Games held in Indianapolis, United States (August 9 – August 15)
- Second Pan Pacific Championships held in Brisbane, Australia (August 13 – August 16)
- August 13 – Tom Jager regains the world record from fellow American Matt Biondi (22.33) in the 50m freestyle (long course) at the 1987 Pan Pacific Swimming Championships in Brisbane, Australia, clocking 22.32.

== Taekwondo ==
- World Championships held in Barcelona, Spain

== Tennis ==
- Grand Slam in tennis men's results:
  - – Australian Open – Stefan Edberg
  - – French Open – Ivan Lendl
  - – Wimbledon championships – Pat Cash
  - – U.S. Open – Ivan Lendl
- Grand Slam in tennis women's results:
  - – Australian Open – Hana Mandlíková
  - – French Open – Steffi Graf
  - – Wimbledon championships – Martina Navratilova
  - – U.S. Open – Martina Navratilova
- Davis Cup
  - Sweden defeats India (5–0) in the final

== Volleyball ==
- Asia Volleyball Championships won by Japan (men) and China (women)
- European Volleyball Championships in Ghent, Belgium won by USSR (men) and DDR (women)
- Pan American Games Volleyball in Indianapolis won by USA (men) and Cuba (women)

== Water polo ==
- Men's World Cup held in Thessaloniki won by Yugoslavia
- Men's event at Pan American Games held in Indianapolis won by USA
- Men's European Championship held in Strasbourg won by USSR
- Women's European Championship held in Strasbourg won by the Netherlands

== Yacht racing ==
- The America's Cup returns to the United States as challenger Stars & Stripes 87, of San Diego Yacht Club, beats Australian defender Kookaburra III, from the Royal Perth Yacht Club, 4 races to 0.

== Multi-sport events ==
- Tenth Pan American Games held in Indianapolis, United States
- Fourth All-Africa Games held in Nairobi, Kenya
- Tenth Mediterranean Games held in Latakia, Syria
- Fourteenth Summer Universiade held in Zagreb, Yugoslavia
- Thirteenth Winter Universiade held in Štrbské Pleso, Czechoslovakia

== Awards ==
- Associated Press Male Athlete of the Year – Ben Johnson, Track and field
- Associated Press Female Athlete of the Year – Jackie Joyner-Kersee, Track and field

== Cross Country Running ==
- NCAA Division 1 men's Cross Country championships won by Joe Falcon
