= Mandarin Handicap Chase =

Steeplechase horse race in Britain

Mandarin Handicap Chase
2025
King's Threshold	Ideal Des Bordes	Rivers Corner

Previous years
2024
Henry's Friend	Hymac	Brave Kingdom
2023
Surrey Quest	Atlanta Brave	Bangers and Cash
2022
Grumpy Charley	Shanty Alley	Laskalin
2021
Saint Palais	Gericault Roque	Nestor Park

2020-2011
2020
Amateur	Nestor Park	Cuban Pete
2019
Copperhead	Moving In Style	Forgot To Ask
2018
Carole's Destrier	Ballydine	Scotchtown
2017
Daklondike	Grand Vision	Knockanrawley
2014
Knockanrawley	Back in June	Financial Climate
2013
Financial Climate	Faultless Feelings	Denali Highway
2012
Pete The Feat	Relax	Rey Nacarado
2011
Rey Nacarado	Ballyegan	Leading Contender

2010-2001
2010
Pride of Dulcote	Punchestowns	Tatenen
2009
Carruthers	Big Fella Thanks	Massini's Maguire
2008
Gone To Lunch	Mr Pointment	Sir Bathwick
2007
Nougat de L'Isle	Mr Ed	Mighty Moose
2006
Tango Royal	Irish Raptor	Desailly
2004
Ulusaba	Juveigneur	Lou Du Moulin Mas
2003
Desailly	Channahrlie	Bush Park
2002
Eltigri	Midnight Gunner	Pharpost
2001
Windross	Fin Bec	Very Very Noble

2000-1991
1999
Rightsaidfred	Ask Antony	Toni's Tip
1996
Sunley Bay	Dextra Dove	Vicompt de Valmont
1995
Hill Trix	Lo Stregone	Dont Tell The Wife
1994
Bishops Island	Rathvinden House	Grange Brake
1993
Jodami	Esha Ness	Sea Island
1991
Chatam	Master Bob	Man O'Magic

The Mandarin Handicap Chase is a National Hunt handicap steeplechase in England which is open to horses aged four years or older. It is run at Newbury over a distance of about 3 miles and 2 furlongs (3 miles 1 furlong and 214 yards, or 5,225 metres), and it is scheduled to take place each year at the end of December.

The race was first run in 1963 and two of the first three runnings were won by Mill House, carrying high weights. In the 1980s it held Listed status, but it is now an ordinary handicap.

== Winners ==
Year	Winner	Age	Weight	Jockey	Trainer
1963	Mill House	6	12-05	Willie Robinson	Fulke Walwyn
1964	Out And About	9	10-05	Bruce Gregory	Ken Cundell
1965	Mill House	8	12-07	Willie Robinson	Fulke Walwyn
1966	Abandoned because of snow and frost
1967	What A Myth	10	11-09	Paul Kelleway	Ryan Price
1968	Abandoned because of snow and frost
1969	The Otter	8	10–11	Brough Scott	R Denning
1970	Lord Jim	9	10-00	Willie Robinson	Fulke Walwyn
1971	The Pantheon	8	11-06	Terry Biddlecombe	Fred Rimell
1972	Royal Toss	10	11-01	Nigel Wakley	H Handel
1973	Abandoned because of fog
1974	Midnight Fury	7	10-03	Vic Soane	Fred Winter
1975	Moonlight Escapade	8	10-05	David Cartwright	C V Miller
1976	Roman Holiday	12	10-06	Vic Soane	Verley Bewicke
1977 (Jan)	Abandoned because of frost
1977 (Dec)	Master Spy	8	11-07	Graham Thorner	Tim Forster
1978	Tommy Joe	8	11-04	Tommy Carmody	Tony Dickinson
1979	Zongalero	9	10-06	Bob Davies	Nicky Henderson
1981	Master Smudge	9	11-07	Richard Linley	Arthur Barrow
1982	Night Nurse	11	11–12	Jonjo O'Neill	Peter Easterby
1983 (Jan)	Earthstopper	9	11-01	George Sloan (Note: amateur jockey)	Josh Gifford
1983 (Dec)	Observe	7	11-07	John Francome	Fred Winter
1984	Maori Venture	8	11-05	Steve Knight	Andy Turnell
1985	Abandoned because of frost
1987	Maori Venture	11	11-03	Steve Knight	Andy Turnell
1988	Contradeal	11	11-10	Kevin Mooney	Fulke Walwyn
1988	Ten Plus	8	11-10	Kevin Mooney	Fulke Walwyn
1989	Polyfemus	7	10-05	John White	Michael Robinson
1990	Party Politics	6	11-02	Andy Adams	Nick Gaselee
1991	Chatam	7	11-10	Peter Scudamore	Martin Pipe
1993 (Jan)	Jodami	8	12-00	Mark Dwyer	Peter Beaumont
1994 (Feb)	Bishops Island	8	10-06	Adrian Maguire	David Nicholson
1995 (Feb)	Hill Trix	9	09-04	Tony Tory	Ken Bishop
1996	Sunley Bay	10	10-02	Philip Hide	Paul Nicholls
1997	Call It A Day	7	11-12	Adrian Maguire	David Nicholson
1998	Court Melody	10	11-13	Timmy Murphy	Paul Nicholls
1999 (Jan)	Rightsaidfred	11	10–13	Graham Bradley	Anna Newton-Smith
2000	No Race
2001	Windross	9	11–12	Robert Thornton	Alan King
2002	Eltigri	10	11-10	Leighton Aspell	A Ennis
2003	Desailly	9	10–11	Richard Johnson	Toby Balding
2004	Ulusaba	9	10–13	Keith Mercer	Ferdy Murphy
2005	Abandoned due to frost
2006	Tango Royal	11	11–12	Tony McCoy	David Pipe
2007	Nougat de L'Isle	6	11-01	Joe Tizzard	Colin Tizzard
2008	Gone To Lunch	9	11-07	Tony McCoy	J Scott
2009	Carruthers	6	11-07	Mattie Batchelor	Mark Bradstock
2010	Pride of Dulcote	7	11-04	Nick Scholfield	Paul Nicholls
2011	Rey Nacarado	7	11-02	Andrew Tinkler	Charlie Longsdon
2012	Pete The Feat	9	11-07	Noel Fehily	Charlie Longsdon
2013	Financial Climate	6	11-00	Thomas Garner	Oliver Sherwood
2014	Knockanrawley	6	11–12	Jason Maguire	Kim Bailey
2015	Silvergrove	7	11-07	David Bass	Ben Pauling
2016	Potters Cross	9	11-09	James King	Rebecca Curtis
2017	Daklondike	5	11-10	Tom Scudamore	David Pipe
2018	Carole's Destrier	10	11-12	Robert Dunne	Neil Mulholland
2019	Copperhead	5	11-11	Harry Cobden	Colin Tizzard
2020	Amateur	7	10-00	Jamie Bargary	John Flint
2021	Saint Palais	4	11-03	Harry Bannister	Richard Bandey
2022	Grumpy Charley	7	12-00	Bryan Carver	Chris Honour
2023	Surrey Quest	6	11-07	James Bowen	Toby Lawes
2024	Henry's Friend	7	11-12	Ben Jones	Ben Pauling
2025	King's Threshold	8	11-05	Ben Jones	Emma Lavelle

== See also ==
- Horse racing in Great Britain
- List of British National Hunt races
