= Masters Handicap Chase =

Masters Handicap Chase
2026
Pic Roc	Hunter Legend	Fortunate Man

Previous years
2025
O'Connell	Dreaming Blue	In d'Or
2024
Java Point	Certainly Red	Dom Of Mary
2023
Castle Robin	Laskalin	Emir Sacree
2022
Le Milos	Deise Aba	Five Star Getaway
2021
Deise Aba	Coo Star Sivola	Calipso Collonges

2020-2011
2020
Deise Aba	Cloudy Glen	Le Rocher
2019
Classic Ben	Ami Desbois	Kimberlite Candy
2018
Ballydine	Holly Bush Henry	Loose Chips
2017
Otago Trail	Loose Chips	Irish Saint
2016
Le Reve	Pete The Feat	Unioniste
2015
Le Reve	Theatrical Star	Beforeall
2014
Relax	Ardkilly Witness	Theatrical Star
2013
On Trend	Viking Blond	Summery Justice
2011
Eric's Charm	Beat The Boys	Burren Legend

2010-2001
2010
Monkerhostin	Exmoor Ranger	Massasoit
2009
Can'T Buy Time	Eric's Charm	Lacdoudal
2008
Gungadu	Burntoakboy	My Immortal
2007
Rambling Minster	Kelami	Briery Fox
2006
Dunbrody Millar	Ladalko	Underwriter
2005
Innox	Lou Du Moulin Mas	Granit d'Estruval
2004
Kings Mistral	Desailly	Exit To Wave
2003
Iris Bleu	Frosty Canyon	Lord Jack
2002
Billingsgate	Echo's of Dawn	Iris Bleu
2001
Storm Damage	General Wolfe	Lance Armstrong

2000-1991
2000
Trouble Ahead	Menesonic	Linton Rocks
1999
Clever Remark	Nahthen Lad	King Lucifer
1998
Court Melody	Destin d'Estruval	Grey Smoke
1997
Dextra Dove	Northern Hide	Only two finished
1996
Amtrak Express	Percy Smollett	Young Hustler
1995
Deep Bramble	Superior Finish	Whispering Steel
1994
Second Schedual	Zeta's Lad	Young Hustler
1993
Country Member	Rushing Wild	Captain Dibble
1992
Espy	Dalkey Sound	Ghofar
1991
Desert Orchid	Nick The Brief	Kildimo

1990-1988
1989
Desert Orchid	Pegwell Bay	Kildimo
1988
Charter Party	Rhyme 'N' Reason	Desert Orchid

The Masters Handicap Chase is a National Hunt handicap steeplechase in England which is open to horses aged five years or older. It is run at Sandown Park over a distance of 3 miles (3 miles and 37 yards, or 4,862 metres), and it is scheduled to take place each year in late January or early February.

The race was first run in 1954 and in the sixties was won three times by Mill House. It was known as the Gainsborough Chase until 1991, when the race was renamed the Agfa Diamond Chase, a Limited Handicap holding Grade 2 status. Agfa sponsored the race until 2007. Since 2008 it has been run as the Masters Handicap Chase.

The race last carried Grade 2 status in 1997 and in recent years it has become a normal (albeit valuable) Class B handicap, currently sponsored by Virgin Bet.

== Winners ==
Year	Winner	Age	Weight	Jockey	Trainer
1954	Shaef	10	11-07	Bryan Marshall	Towser Gosden
1955	Abandoned because of snow
1956	Abandoned because of frost
1957	Rose Park	11	12-05	Graham Nicholls	Peter Cazalet
1958	Pelopidas	8	11–11	Dave Dick	Frenchie Nicholson
1959	Saffron Tartan	8	11–11	Toss Taaffe	Vincent O'Brien (Ir)
1960	Double Star	8	11–11	Arthur Freeman	Peter Cazalet
1961	Carraroe	9	11-07	Taffy Jenkins	C Mitchell
1962	Blue Dolphin	9	11-05	Bill Rees	Peter Cazalet
1963	Abandoned because of snow and frost
1964	Mill House	7	12-05	Willie Robinson	Fulke Walwyn
1965	Mill House	8	12-05	Willie Robinson	Fulke Walwyn
1966	What A Myth	9	11-09	Paul Kellaway	Ryan Price
1967	Mill House	10	11-09	Willie Robinson	Fulke Walwyn
1968	The Laird	7	11-09	Jeff King	Bob Turnell
1969	Stalbridge Colonist	10	11-09	Stan Mellor	Ken Cundell
1970	Spanish Steps	7	12-00	John Cook	Edward Courage
1971	Titus Oates	9	12-00	Ron Barry	Gordon W. Richards
1972	Crisp	9	12-00	Richard Pitman	Fred Winter
1973	Royal Toss	11	11-09	Nigel Wakley	H Handel
1974	Kilvulgan	7	10-09	Andy Turnell	Bob Turnell
1975	Abandoned because of waterlogged state of course
1976	Bula	11	12-00	John Francome	Fred Winter
1977	Master H	8	10-08	Mr John Weston	Michael Oliver
1978	Master H	9	11-03	John Francome	Michael Oliver
1979	Diamond Edge	8	11-03	Bill Smith	Fulke Walwyn
1980	Diamond Edge	9	12-00	Bill Smith	Fulke Walwyn
1981	Tragus	9	10-07	Bob Davies	David Morley
1982	Bregawn	8	10-07	Robert Earnshaw	Michael Dickinson
1983	Observe	7	11-03	John Francome	Fred Winter
1984	Burrough Hill Lad	8	11–10	John Francome	Jenny Pitman
1985	Burrough Hill Lad^{[1]}	9	12-00	John Francome	Jenny Pitman
1986	Burrough Hill Lad	10	12-00	Peter Scudamore	Jenny Pitman
1987	Desert Orchid	8	11–10	Colin Brown	David Elsworth
1988	Charter Party	10	10–11	Richard Dunwoody	David Nicholson
1989	Desert Orchid	10	12-00	Simon Sherwood	David Elsworth
1990	Abandoned due to waterlogged state of course
1991	Desert Orchid	12	12-00	Richard Dunwoody	David Elsworth
1992	Espy	9	10-07	Graham Bradley	Charlie Brooks
1993	Country Member	8	10-07	Luke Harvey	Andy Turnell
1994	Second Schedual	9	10-07	Richard Dunwoody	David Nicholson
1995	Deep Bramble	8	10–13	Chris Maude	Paul Nicholls
1996	Amtrak Express	9	10-07	Mick Fitzgerald	Nicky Henderson
1997	Dextra Dove	10	11-02	Norman Williamson	Simon Earle
1998	Court Melody	10	10-05	Chris Maude	Paul Nicholls
1999	Clever Remark	10	10-05	Timmy Murphy	Jim Old
2000	Trouble Ahead	9	11–04	Rupert Wakley	Kim Bailey
2001	Storm Damage	9	10-07	Robert Thornton	Paul Nicholls
2002	Billingsgate	10	11-01	Richard Johnson	Philip Hobbs
2003	Iris Bleu	7	11-02	Tom Scudamore	Martin Pipe
2004	Kings Mistral	11	11-00	Richard Johnson	Patrick Chamings
2005	Innox	9	10-08	Robert Thornton	François Doumen
2006	Dunbrody Millar	8	10-03	Tom Malone	Peter Bowen
2007	Rambling Minster	9	10-05	Richie McGrath	Keith Reveley
2008	Gungadu	8	11-05	Sam Thomas	Paul Nicholls
2009	Can't Buy Time	7	10-00	Richie McLernon	Jonjo O'Neill
2010	Monkerhostin	13	11–12	Mr M Griffiths	Philip Hobbs
2011	Eric's Charm	13	10–11	Leighton Aspell	Oliver Sherwood
2012	Abandoned due to frost
2013	On Trend	7	10-00	Tom Cannon	Nick Gifford
2014	Relax	9	11-01	Aidan Coleman	Venetia Williams
2015	Le Reve	7	10–13	Daryl Jacob	Lucy Wadham
2016	Le Reve	8	11-04	Harry Skelton	Lucy Wadham
2017	Otago Trail	9	11–09	Charlie Deutsch	Venetia Williams
2018	Ballydine	8	10–11	Sean Bowen	Charlie Longsdon
2019	Classic Ben	6	10–10	Charlie Gethings	Stuart Edmunds
2020	Deise Aba	7	10–07	Tom O'Brien	Philip Hobbs
2021	Deise Aba	8	11–07	Richard Johnson	Philip Hobbs
2022	Le Milos	7	11–06	Alan Johns	Tim Vaughan
2023	Castle Robin	8	11–05	Paul O'Brien	Charlie Longsdon
2024	Java Point	9	11–01	Jonathan Burke	Henry Oliver
2025	O'Connell	9	10-11	Gavin Sheehan	Joel Parkinson & Sue Smith
2026	Pic Roc	8	10-07	Ben Jones	Ben Pauling

^{1} The 1985 edition was a walkover.

== See also ==
- Horseracing in Great Britain
- List of British National Hunt races
