= 1988 in sports =

1988 in sports describes the year's events in world sport.

== Alpine skiing ==
- Alpine Skiing World Cup
  - Men's overall season champion: Pirmin Zurbriggen, Switzerland
  - Women's overall season champion: Michela Figini, Switzerland

== American football ==
- Super Bowl XXII – the Washington Redskins (NFC) won 42–10 over the Denver Broncos (AFC)
  - Location: Jack Murphy Stadium
  - Attendance: 73,302
  - MVP: Doug Williams, QB (Washington)
    - Williams becomes the first black quarterback to play in a Super Bowl.
- December 17 – Jamie Morris of Washington Redskins sets NFL single game record for rushing attempts (45) in 20–17 loss to Cincinnati Bengals.
- January 1 – Orange Bowl (1987 season):
  - The Miami Hurricanes won 20-14 over the Oklahoma Sooners to win the national championship

== Athletics ==
- September – Athletics at the 1988 Summer Olympics held in Seoul, South Korea

== Australian rules football ==
- Victorian Football League
  - Hawthorn wins the 92nd VFL Premiership (Hawthorn 22.20 (152) d Melbourne 6.20 (56))
  - Brownlow Medal awarded to Gerard Healy (Sydney Swans)

== Baseball ==
- January 12 – Former Pirates slugger Willie Stargell is the only player elected to the Baseball Hall of Fame. Stargell, leader of two world champions in Pittsburgh and NL co-MVP in 1979 at age 39, becomes the 17th player to be elected in his first year of eligibility. Jim Bunning falls four votes shy of the 321 needed for election in his 13th year on the ballot.
- August 8 – The first night game ever at Wrigley Field is played. After an attempt the previous night was rained out, the Cubs defeat the New York Mets 6–4.
- World Series – Los Angeles Dodgers won 4 games to 1 over the Oakland Athletics. The Series MVP was Orel Hershiser, Los Angeles

== Basketball ==
- NCAA Men's Basketball Championship –
  - Kansas wins 83–79 over Oklahoma
- NBA Finals –
  - Los Angeles Lakers won 4 games to 3 over the Detroit Pistons
- National Basketball League (Australia) Finals:
  - Canberra Cannons defeated the North Melbourne Giants 2–1 in the best-of-three final series.

== Boxing ==
- June 6 – in Las Vegas, Iran Barkley knocked out Thomas Hearns in the 3rd round to win the WBC Middleweight Title.
- June 27 – in what was dubbed Superfight '88 Mike Tyson knocks out Michael Spinks in Atlantic City, New Jersey and defends the Undisputed Heavyweight Championship of the World.
- November 7 – in Las Vegas, boxer Sugar Ray Leonard knocks out Donnie LaLonde.

== Canadian football ==
- Grey Cup – Winnipeg Blue Bombers won 22–21 over the B.C. Lions
- Vanier Cup – Calgary Dinos won 52–23 over the St. Mary's Huskies

== Cycling ==
- Giro d'Italia won by Andrew Hampsten of the United States
- Tour de France – Pedro Delgado of Spain
- UCI Road World Championships – Men's road race – Maurizio Fondriest of Italy

== Darts ==
- Embassy World Professional Darts Championships won by Bob Anderson of England

== Dog sledding ==
- Iditarod Trail Sled Dog Race Champion –
  - Susan Butcher wins with lead dogs: Granite & Tolstoi

== Field hockey ==
- Men's Champions Trophy held in Lahore won by West Germany
- Olympic Games (Men's Competition) won by Great Britain

== Figure skating ==
- World Figure Skating Championships –
  - Men's champion: Brian Boitano, United States
  - Ladies' champion: Katarina Witt, East Germany
  - Pair skating champions: Elena Valova / Oleg Vasiliev, Soviet Union
  - Ice dancing champions: Natalia Bestemianova / Andrei Bukin, Soviet Union

== Gaelic Athletic Association ==
- Camogie
  - All-Ireland Camogie Champion: Kilkenny
  - National Camogie League: Kilkenny
- Gaelic football
  - All-Ireland Senior Football Championship – Meath 0–13 died Cork 0–9
  - National Football League – Meath 2–13 died Dublin 0–11
- Ladies' Gaelic football
  - All-Ireland Senior Football Champion: Kerry
  - National Football League: Kerry
- Hurling
  - All-Ireland Senior Hurling Championship – Galway 1–15 died Tipperary 0–14
  - National Hurling League – Tipperary 3–15 beat Offaly 2–9

== Golf ==
Men's professional

- Masters Tournament – Sandy Lyle
- U.S. Open – Curtis Strange
- British Open – Seve Ballesteros
- PGA Championship – Jeff Sluman
- PGA Tour money leader – Curtis Strange – $1,147,644
- Senior PGA Tour money leader – Bob Charles – $533,929

Men's amateur

- British Amateur – Cristian Härdin
- U.S. Amateur – Eric Meeks
- European Amateur – not played

Women's professional

- Nabisco Dinah Shore – Amy Alcott
- LPGA Championship – Sherri Turner
- U.S. Women's Open – Liselotte Neumann
- Classique du Maurier – Sally Little
- LPGA Tour money leader – Sherri Turner – $350,851

== Harness racing ==
- North America Cup – Jate Lobell
- United States Pacing Triple Crown races –
  1. Cane Pace – Runnymede Lobell
  2. Little Brown Jug – B.J. Scoot
  3. Messenger Stakes – Matt's Scooter
- United States Trotting Triple Crown races –
  1. Hambletonian – Armbro Goal
  2. Yonkers Trot – Southern Newton
  3. Kentucky Futurity – Huggie Hanover
- Australian Inter Dominion Harness Racing Championship –
  - Pacers: Our Maestro
  - Trotters: True Roman

== Horse racing ==
Steeplechases

- Cheltenham Gold Cup – Charter Party
- Grand National – Rhyme 'n' Reason

Flat races

- Australia – Melbourne Cup won by Empire Rose
- Canada – Queen's Plate won by Regal Intention
- France – Prix de l'Arc de Triomphe won by Tony Bin
- Ireland – Irish Derby Stakes won by Kahyasi
- Japan – Japan Cup won by Pay the Butler
- English Triple Crown Races:
  1. 2,000 Guineas Stakes – Doyoun
  2. The Derby – Kahyasi
  3. St. Leger Stakes – Minster Son
- United States Triple Crown Races:
  1. Kentucky Derby – Winning Colors
  2. Preakness Stakes – Risen Star
  3. Belmont Stakes – Risen Star
- Breeders' Cup World Thoroughbred Championships:
  1. Breeders' Cup Classic – Alysheba
  2. Breeders' Cup Distaff – Personal Ensign
  3. Breeders' Cup Juvenile – Is It True
  4. Breeders' Cup Juvenile Fillies – Open Mind
  5. Breeders' Cup Mile – Miesque
  6. Breeders' Cup Sprint – Gulch
  7. Breeders' Cup Turf – Great Communicator

== Ice hockey ==
- Art Ross Trophy as the NHL's leading scorer during the regular season: Mario Lemieux, Pittsburgh Penguins
- Hart Memorial Trophy for the NHL's Most Valuable Player: Mario Lemieux, Pittsburgh Penguins
- Stanley Cup – Edmonton Oilers won 4 games to 0 over the Boston Bruins
- August 9 – Hockey's Wayne Gretzky traded to the Los Angeles Kings
- World Hockey Championship –
  - Men's champion: Soviet Union won the Olympic gold medal
  - Junior Men's champion: Canada defeated the USSR
- December 31 – in a game between the Pittsburgh Penguins and New Jersey Devils, Mario Lemieux scores five goals and becomes the only player in NHL history to score a goal in all five possible game situations in the same game: even-strength, power play, shorthanded, penalty shot, and empty net.

== Lacrosse ==
- The New Jersey Saints beat the Washington Wave 17–16 to win the Eagle Pro Box Lacrosse League Championship.
  - Following the season, the Eagle Pro Box Lacrosse League changes its name to the Major Indoor Lacrosse League (MILL).
- The Brooklin Redmen win the Mann Cup.
- The Kitchener-Waterloo win the Founders Cup.
- The Esquimalt Legion win the Minto Cup.

== Olympic Games ==
- 1988 Summer Olympics takes place in Seoul, South Korea
  - USSR wins the most medals (132) and the most gold medals (55).
  - September 24 – Canada's Ben Johnson wins Olympic gold in 100 metres. Two days later, he is stripped of the medal after testing positive for a banned substance.
- 1988 Winter Olympics takes place in Calgary, Canada
  - USSR wins the most medals (29) and the most gold medals (11).

== Racewalk ==
- February 19 - Helga Arendt, Silke-Beate Knoll, Mechthild Kluth, Gisela Kinzel walk indoor female world record 4x200 meter (1:32.55)

== Radiosport ==
- Fourth Amateur Radio Direction Finding World Championship held in Beatenberg, Switzerland.

== Rugby league ==
- 1988 Great Britain Lions tour
- 1988 New Zealand rugby league season
- The 1988 NSWRL season sees the debuts of three new franchises: Brisbane Broncos, Gold Coast Chargers and Newcastle Knights. The Canterbury-Bankstown Bulldogs win their sixth title, defeating Balmain Tigers 24–12 in the Grand Final
- 1988 Pacific Cup
- 1988 Panasonic Cup
- 1987–88 Rugby Football League season / 1988–89 Rugby Football League season
- 1988 State of Origin series
- 1985–1988 Rugby League World Cup

== Rugby union ==
- 94th Five Nations Championship series is shared by France and Wales

== Snooker ==
- World Snooker Championship – Steve Davis beats Terry Griffiths 18–11
- World rankings – Steve Davis remains world number one for 1988/89

== Swimming ==
- Olympic Games held in Seoul, South Korea (September 18 – September 25)
- March 25 – USA's Tom Jager betters his own world record (22.32) in the 50m freestyle (long course) at a swimming meet in Orlando, Florida, clocking 22.23.
- September 24 – Matt Biondi breaks Tom Jager's world record (22.23) in the 50m freestyle (long course) in the final of the event at the Seoul Olympic Games, clocking 22.14.

== Tennis ==
- Grand Slam in tennis men's results:
  1. Australian Open – Mats Wilander
  2. French Open – Mats Wilander
  3. Wimbledon – Stefan Edberg
  4. U.S. Open – Mats Wilander
- Steffi Graf becomes only the third woman in history to win the Grand Slam in tennis and the golden slam –
  1. Australian Open – Steffi Graf
  2. French Open – Steffi Graf
  3. Wimbledon – Steffi Graf
  4. U.S. Open – Steffi Graf
- 1988 Summer Olympics
  - Men's Singles Competition – Miloslav Mečíř
  - Women's Singles Competition – Steffi Graf
  - Men's Doubles Competition – Ken Flach & Robert Seguso
  - Women's Doubles Competition – Pam Shriver & Zina Garrison
- Davis Cup
  - Germany won 4–1 over Sweden in world team tennis

== Yacht racing ==
- San Diego Yacht Club retains the America's Cup as Stars & Stripes '88 defeats New Zealand challenger KZ1, from the Mercury Bay Boating Club, 2 races to 0

== Volleyball ==
- 1988 Summer Olympics (men) won by United States of America
- 1988 Summer Olympics (women) won by USSR

== Water polo ==
- 1988 Summer Olympics (men) won by Yugoslavia

== Awards ==
- Associated Press Male Athlete of the Year – Orel Hershiser, Major League Baseball
- Associated Press Female Athlete of the Year – Florence Griffith Joyner, Track and field
