= 1987 Preakness Stakes =

112th running of the Preakness Stakes

112th Preakness Stakes
- The Preakness Stakes
- Location: Pimlico Race Course, Baltimore, Maryland, United States
- Date: May 16, 1987
- Winning horse: Alysheba
- Jockey: Chris McCarron
- Conditions: Fast
- Surface: Dirt

The 1987 Preakness Stakes was the 112th running of the Preakness Stakes thoroughbred horse race. The race took place on May 16, 1987, and was televised in the United States on the ABC television network. Alysheba, who was jockeyed by Chris McCarron, won the race by a half length over runner-up Bet Twice. Approximate post time was 5:34 p.m. Eastern Time. The race was run over a fast track in a final time of 1:55-4/5. The Maryland Jockey Club reported total attendance of 87,945, this is recorded as second highest on the list of American thoroughbred racing top attended events for North America in 1987.

== Payout ==
The 112th Preakness Stakes Payout Schedule

Program Number	Horse Name	Win	Place	Show
6	Alysheba	US$6.00	$4.60	$3.40
1	Bet Twice	-	$4.60	$3.60
9	Cryptoclearance	–	–	$3.00

$2 Exacta: (6–1) paid $23.00 $2 Trifecta: (6-1-9) paid $80.70

== The full chart ==
Finish Position	Margin (lengths)	Post Position	Horse name	Jockey	Trainer	Owner	Post Time Odds	Purse Earnings
1st	0	6	Alysheba	Chris McCarron	Jack Van Berg	Dorothy Scharbauer	2.00-1 favorite	$421,100
2nd	1/2	1	Bet Twice	Craig Perret	Jimmy Croll	Cisley Stable	4.90-1	$70,000
3rd	2	9	Cryptoclearance	Jose Santos	Flint Schulhofer	Phiip Teinowitz	2.50-1	$35,000
4th	53/4	7	Gulch	Angel Cordero	LeRoy Jolley	Peter M. Brant	3.50-1	$17,500
5th	61/2	7	Avies Copy	Mickey Solomone	David Kassen	T. Brown Badgett	24.30-1	
6th	7	3	Phantom Jet	Keith K. Allen	Philip A. Gleaves	Aisco Stable	18.50-1	
7th	141/4	5	Lookinforthebigone	Gary Stevens	D. Wayne Lukas	Bwamazon Farm	14.20-1	
8th	191/4	4	No More Flowers	Walter Guerra	Happy Alter	Arthur I. Appleton	32.30-1	
9th	231/4	2	Harriman	Vincent Bracciale Jr.	Charles Peoples	Bayard Sharp	46.90-1	

- Winning Breeder: Preston Madden; (KY)
- Final Time: 1:55.80
- Track Condition: Fast
- Total Attendance: 87,945

== See also ==
- 1987 Kentucky Derby
