= Gold Actor =

Japanese Thoroughbred racehorse

Gold Actor ゴールドアクター
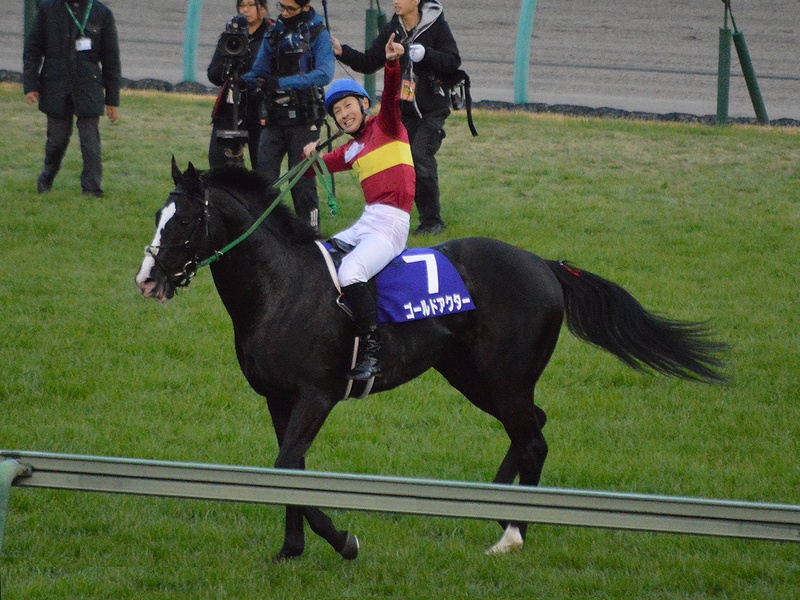
- Gold Actor after winning the Arima Kinen in 2015
- Breed: Thoroughbred
- Sire: Screen Hero
- Grandsire: Grass Wonder
- Dam: Heilong Xing
- Damsire: Kyowa Alysheba
- Sex: Stallion
- Foaled: 18 May 2011
- Country: Japan
- Colour: Dark bay/Brown
- Breeder: Hokusho Farm
- Owner: Kaname Ishiro → Hisayo Ishiro
- Racing colours
- Trainer: Tadashige Nakagawa
- Jockey: Hayato Yoshida
- Record: 24: 9–3–2
- Earnings: 743,244,000 ¥

Major wins
- Copa Republica Argentina (2015); Arima Kinen (2015); Nikkei Sho (2016); Sankei Sho All Comers (2016)

Gold Actor (Japanese: ゴールドアクター, Hepburn: Gōrudo Akutā; May 18, 2011) is a former Japanese thoroughbred racehorse and current stud. He was famously known as the winner of the 60th Arima Kinen in 2015, upsetting the field of horses such as Kitasan Black, Gold Ship and Marialite in the process as an eighth favourite. He also won three grade 2 races such as Copa Republica Argentina, Nikkei Sho and Sankei Sho All Comers.

== Background ==
Gold Actor was foaled out of Heilong Xing, who won two steeplechase races in her career. His damsire is Kyowa Alysheba, a horse with five wins in 19 starts and placed third in the 1995 Asahi Challenge Cup. Gold Actor's sire is Screen Hero, who famously won the 2008 Japan Cup. Screen Hero himself was sired by a 1999 dual grand prix (Won the Takarazuka Kinen and Arima Kinen in the same season) horse, Grass Wonder.

His name was a combination of the stable crown name – Gold and a homage to his sire name, Screen Hero – Actor.

== Racing career ==
=== 2013: two-year-old season ===
Gold Actor made his debut on 24 November at the 2000 m races in Tokyo Racecourse. In this debut, He maintained the seventh position throughout all bends and maintained it until the finish. A month later, he ran again on the different racecourse (at Nakayama this time) with similar distance. On a good condition track, he performed better as he finished in fourth for his second attempt.

=== 2014: three-year-old season ===
To begin this new year, Gold Actor ran in a longer race in Nakayama which is a 2200 m races. In this race, he ran majorly in the midfield but proceed to break through from fourth position at the final corner to take the win at the line by three-quarters of a length over Bang Zoom. With the first win in hand, Gold Actor joined his first allowance race in the Yurikamome Sho in Tokyo. He raced well in this race as he rallied for the win but failed as he finished in second-place one length behind the winner, Langley. Then, he ran in the Yamabuki Sho next. At the end of this race, he managed to pull away from the pack at the straight but closedly lost it by a nose against the late chasing Tosen Matakoiya at the line. Then he ran in the Aoba Sho which would be his first graded race. In this race, he placed fourth out of the eleventh horses. The current jockey, Shu Ishibashi described that he failed to secure a good position in the race but admitted that Gold Actor is getting stronger as the days went on.

On the autumn campaign, Gold Actor resumed his progress at the 2600 metres race in Sapporo Racecourse. This time, he would be switching his jockey to Hayato Yoshida. In this allowance race, he started early and positioned himself on the leading pack and only lost the lead briefly at the second bend. He retook the lead and maintained it to the wire to win by three and a half lengths over Godfroy in second place. This strategy worked out for his next race and he put on a second win in a row at the Shikotsuko Tokubetsu. Yoshida explained that he intended for Gold Actor to run behind the pack at the start but switched the plan as they hit a good start and let the horse settled it with their own great pace.

This winning streak earned him enough prize money that was needed to qualify for the Kikuka Sho. As the day approaching for his first Grade 1 race, one of the training assistant, Shinojima explained about his training. He said that the horse was having a good rundown with the jockey and in a great shape and despite never ran in a 3000 metres race before, he believed that Gold Actor got the qualities to perform well in longer race. In this Kikuka Sho, Gold Actor settled in a good position at middling pack between fourth to sixth position. He was able to put on chase at the final straight and placed third behind the record breaking winner, Toho Jackal and Sounds of Earth. At the post race, Yoshida commented that he was able to secure a great position from the start but ultimately lost the race due to lack of finishing speed at the end (the two finishers above them have the two fastest last three furlong speed). This would be his last race of the year and he would be rested for the next nine months.

=== 2015: four-year-old season ===
This season, Gold Actor started his year on the autumn campaign, specifically in the Toyako Tokubetsu on July. Despite being agitated in the paddock, He managed to win this race by two lengths over Yamanin Argosy. He was included in the registration for the Sankei Sho All Comers but had to be excluded on the final roster due to full gate. Therefore, the owner opted him for another open graded race which was The October Stakes in Tokyo. In this race, Gold Actor spurted from the third place in the final phase to grab his second successive win by one and three-quarters length over Samson's Pride. Yoshida signaled Gold Actor to start the break at the third corner and he was satisfied with how his finishing run turned out. This great start prompted the team for a try for his next grade race which would be the Copa Republica Argentina, a 2500 metres Grade 2 race held in Tokyo with a goal for third straight win. The condition for this race was soft due to heavy rain downpour on that day. However, Gold Actor raced well along the track and managed to overtake Meisho Kadomatsu who surged earlier just right before the line and won the race by a head margin. This would be his first ever graded race win.

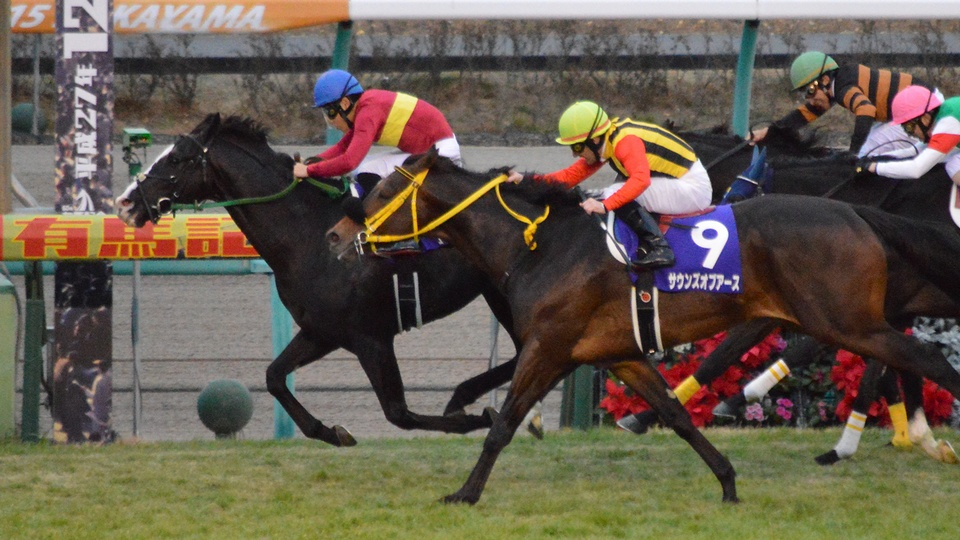
Gold Actor reached the line first over Sounds of Earth (number 9) and Kitasan Black (orange and black stripe silk) at the 2015 Arima Kinen

It was decided that his race after this momentous win would be his last race of the year which would be on the Arima Kinen in Nakayama. His trainer, Nakagawa did not put any expectation and only wanted the horse to learnt from experience from other horses around. The preparation for this big race was going well as he ran a light lap up the Miho uphill course before cantering on the W track with good result two days prior of the race. When the gates open, Gold Actor broke sharply from stall seven and led briefly before allowing the two three-year-olds, Kitasan Black and Lia Fail, to set the pace in first and second, respectively, while hugging the rails in fourth or fifth. Then, he advanced to third position along the rails with Gold Ship on his outside and did not miss his chance to angle out slightly to secure a clear run coming into the home straight. Gold Actor steadily increased his stride in the last 200 meters, hitting the front with 50 meters to go then held off a strong charge from Sounds of Earth for a neck win. This was his first G1 win, his jockey (Yoshida) first G1 win and also became the first horse from the Kanto region to win this race since Matsurida Gogh in 2007. Yoshida elated after the race and quoted "I'm glad I didn't give up and kept going until now". After the race, he was getting rested and prepared for next season's Tenno Sho (Spring).

=== 2016: five-year-old season ===
Gold Actor made his first appearance this season at the Nikkei Sho as a preparation for the Tenno Sho (Spring). When the race began, Gold Actor managed to mark Sounds of Earth along the race and executed his run well enough to surpass him near the finish line. He won this race by three-quarters of a length over Sounds of Earth who finished second behind him for the second successive time. Due to this four-win streak since last season, Nakagawa convinced that this horse was in good condition and prepared for bigger challenge.

For the Tenno Sho (Spring), Gold Actor was the highest rated horse before the race at 119. But his luck was not really good this time as he was voted to start from gate 17, stall 8 at the race. At the race day, the outside gate became his problem as he tried to positioned by going wide in the seventh and eighth position. Although he made a headway rounding the last turns improving position at one point to second, Gold Actor came up empty in the stretch and faded to 12th-place, his worst position to date. After this rest, Nakagawa skipped him from the Takarazuka Kinen and rested him until the autumn campaign begin.

Gold Actor started the back year with a run in the Sankei Sho All Comers, which was the race he could not participate last time around due to full gate. His training season back was not clicking as he was not "being in the zone yet" as hoped by Nakagawa. A few weeks later after several training runs with Yoshida, Nakagawa showed confidence in the training process, saying, "Everything is going smoothly. It's a week before the race, so we put in a little extra effort". This extra effort proved fruitful as Gold Actor returned to winning ways. He raced mainly in sixth position, then caught up with the leaders in the straight on the outside to take the lead. Gold Actor ultimately won by a neck over Satono Noblesse who held on from the inside track. This was his fourth graded stakes win.

For the next race, Gold Actor joined the Japan Cup. Yoshida kept his cool on this new challenge and said "I have no intention of adjusting to the competition. I will run this horse's race as usual." For this race, he was voted to start from gate 2, post 3 which is the inside gate. This race gave a better start as Gold Actor chased the leaders at the third position. He hussled for the 2nd place but faded out in the final 100 metres and finished in fourth place behind Kitasan Black, Sounds of Earth and Cheval Grand. A string of good result made Gold Actor qualified for the Arima Kinen again as the third most voted horses behind Kitasan Black and Satono Diamond. Leading to the race, Yoshida was struck by sternoclavicular joint injury in the 10th race at Nakayama on 18 December but thankfully he recovered to ride Gold Actor in their title-defense bet. The title defense seemed on the spot as he and Kitasan Black kept dueling until the homestretch but the three-year-old, fresh from the Kikuka Sho title, Satono Diamond had a late burst of acceleration and surpassed him on 50 metres mark and Kitasan Black right before the line to win the race. Yoshida and Gold Actor who finished in third described that their run was good and according to plan but at the fourth corner, Gold Actor could not pulled away as he leveled with Kitasan Black at that point. Regardless, both the jockey and the trainer admitted that Gold Actor ran his best that day.

=== 2017: six-year-old season ===
Just like the previous season, Gold Actor started the season with a run at the Nikkei Sho. They aimed for the back to back win after failing to defend the Arima Kinen previous season. That hope was slashed as Gold Actor who was running in third along the race, gassed out near the end and only placed fifth at the line. He attempted for a better run at the Tenno Sho (Spring) next. Nakagawa switched his jockey from Yoshida to Norihiro Yokoyama this time to see whether the horse could run better with the new jockey. For this race, he broke out from the start poorly. He ran mostly at the middle pack after a bad start but managed to improve his position in final stretch and finished in seventh-place. Yokoyama admitted that his poor start was wobbly, a sign that indirectly said that the race was gone from there.

Despite poor start of the season, Gold Actor was still a fan favourite when he accumulated 47,419 votes from the public for the Takarazuka Kinen entry. This number placed him as the fifth most voted horse for this race. In this race, Gold Actor ran well as he stayed on the midfield before bursting through the front group on the inside track and dueled with Satono Crown to the line. However, Satono Crown further accelerated before the wire to pull away from him and won by three-quarters of a length in the end, leaving Gold Actor to finish in second place. Yokoyama who rode him again this time said that the track was perfect for the horse, both him and the horse ran excellently throughout the race and disappointed not being able to win it.

Due to this positive result, Gold Actor supposed to race in the Sankei Sho All Comers next to start the second half of the season. This plan was halted as he developed some symptoms of discomfort on his hind legs. He was rested further for conditioning, which eventually he had to skip the whole remaining season due to lack of rest time between the campaigns.

=== 2018: seven-year-old season ===
In January, he started in the American Jockey Club Cup race, with Yutaka Take in the helm. Despite being the third favourite for the race, he faded out after the seventh position on the final stretch and finished in last place (11th). Two months later, he ran in the second event of a newly promoted Osaka Hai race. Yoshida was back with him this time but this move was not working as intended as he dropped towards the back after the third corner from the middle pack and finished in 16th-place. He was being rested again and returned on September at the Sankei Sho All Comers, ridden by Yoshida. In this race, he ran on the leading pack, switching between third and fourth place. In the final stretch, he was unable to sprint and fall back and finished second last at 11th-place. After this race, Gold Actor retired from racing and moved on as a stud. His registration as an active racehorse were terminated on 10 October.

== Racing form ==
Gold Actor won nine races and hit the podium five more times out of 24 starts. This data is available based on JBIS and netkeiba.

Date	Track	Race	Grade	Distance (Condition)	Entry	HN	Odds (Favored)	Finish	Time	Margins	Jockey	Winner (Runner-up)
2013 – two-year-old season
Nov 24	Tokyo	2yo Newcomer		2,000 m (Firm)	16	10	60.1 (11)	7th	2:04.8	0.6	Masayoshi Ebina	Cuatro Guts
Dec 21	Nakayama	2yo Maiden		2,000 m (Good)	18	2	12.9 (6)	4th	2:04.7	0.3	Shu Ishibashi	Shonan Lagoon
2014 – three-year-old season
Jan 12	Nakayama	3yo Maiden		2,200 m (Firm)	16	12	8.6 (3)	1st	2:15.8	−0.1	Shu Ishibashi	(Bang Zoom)
Feb 10	Tokyo	Yurikamome Sho	ALW (1W)	2,400 m (Good)	16	9	44.8 (14)	2nd	2:30.6	0.2	Shu Ishibashi	Langley
Apr 5	Nakayama	Yamabuki Sho	ALW (1W)	2,200 m (Good)	16	15	5.2 (3)	2nd	2:15.7	0.0	Shu Ishibashi	Tosen Matakoiya
May 3	Tokyo	Aoba Sho	2	2,400 m (Firm)	18	10	22.5 (7)	4th	2:26.6	0.1	Shu Ishibashi	Shonan Lagoon
Aug 2	Sapporo	3yo+ Allowance	1W	2,600 m (Firm)	10	5	1.7 (1)	1st	2:42.5	−0.6	Hayato Yoshida	(Godfroy)
Aug 23	Sapporo	Shikotsuko Tokubetsu	ALW (2W)	2,600 m (Firm)	14	7	1.8 (1)	1st	2:44.2	−0.2	Hayato Yoshida	(T M Dai Power)
Oct 26	Kyoto	Kikuka Sho	1	3,000 m (Firm)	18	10	19.6 (7)	3rd	3:01.7	0.7	Hayato Yoshida	Toho Jackal
2015 – four-year-old season
Jul 4	Hakodate	Toyako Tokubetsu	ALW (2W)	2,000 m (Firm)	13	7	1.9 (1)	1st	2:02.0	−0.3	Hayato Yoshida	(Yamanin Argosy)
Oct 12	Tokyo	October Stakes	ALW (3W)	2,400 m (Firm)	12	3	2.0 (1)	1st	2:25.8	−0.3	Hayato Yoshida	(Samson's Pride)
Nov 8	Tokyo	Copa Republica Argentina	2	2,500 m (Soft)	18	15	2.1 (1)	1st	2:34.0	0.0	Hayato Yoshida	(Meisho Kadomatsu)
Dec 27	Nakayama	Arima Kinen	1	2,500 m (Firm)	16	7	17.0 (8)	1st	2:33.0	0.0	Hayato Yoshida	(Sounds of Earth)
2016 – five-year-old season
Mar 26	Nakayama	Nikkei Sho	2	2,500 m (Firm)	9	9	3.3 (2)	1st	2:36.8	−0.1	Hayato Yoshida	(Sounds of Earth)
May 1	Kyoto	Tenno Sho (Spring)	1	3,200 m (Firm)	18	17	3.8 (1)	12th	3:16.1	0.8	Hayato Yoshida	Kitasan Black
Sep 25	Nakayama	Sankei Sho All Comers	2	2,200 m (Firm)	12	6	2.0 (1)	1st	2:11.9	0.0	Hayato Yoshida	(Satono Noblesse)
Nov 27	Tokyo	Japan Cup	1	2,400 m (Firm)	17	3	4.5 (3)	4th	2:26.4	0.6	Hayato Yoshida	Kitasan Black
Dec 25	Nakayama	Arima Kinen	1	2,500 m (Firm)	16	2	7.9 (3)	3rd	2:32.7	0.1	Hayato Yoshida	Satono Diamond
2017 – six-year-old season
Mar 25	Nakayama	Nikkei Sho	2	2,500 m (Firm)	16	12	1.7 (1)	5th	2:33.2	0.4	Hayato Yoshida	Sciacchetra
Apr 30	Kyoto	Tenno Sho (Spring)	1	3,200 m (Firm)	17	12	20.7 (5)	7th	3:13.6	1.1	Norihiro Yokoyama	Kitasan Black
Jun 25	Hanshin	Takarazuka Kinen	1	2,200 m (Good)	11	2	12.7 (5)	2nd	2:11.5	0.1	Norihiro Yokoyama	Satono Crown
2018 – seven-year-old season
Jan 21	Nakayama	American Jockey Club Cup	2	2,200 m (Firm)	11	5	4.3 (3)	11th	2:16.0	2.7	Yutaka Take	Danburite
Apr 1	Hanshin	Osaka Hai	1	2,000 m (Firm)	16	7	80.6 (12)	16th	2:01.9	3.7	Hayato Yoshida	Suave Richard
Sep 23	Nakayama	Sankei Sho All Comers	2	2,200 m (Firm)	12	8	18.1 (6)	11th	2:13.3	2.1	Hayato Yoshida	Rey de Oro

Legend:
Turf

== Stud career ==
Gold Actor stood as a stud at the Yushun Stallion Station in Niikappu, Hokkaido. He is still active as a stud there. For now, he had conceptions with 216 mares, produced 156 foals with 154 registered, earned 677,507,000 ¥ with AEI of 0.66.

== Pedigree ==
Pedigree of Gold Actor
Sire Screen Hero ch. 2004	Grass Wonder ch. 1995	Silver Hawk	Roberto
Sire Screen Hero ch. 2004	Grass Wonder ch. 1995	Silver Hawk	Gris Vitesse
Sire Screen Hero ch. 2004	Grass Wonder ch. 1995	Ameriflora	Danzig
Sire Screen Hero ch. 2004	Grass Wonder ch. 1995	Ameriflora	Graceful Touch
Sire Screen Hero ch. 2004	Running Heroine b. 1993	Sunday Silence	Halo
Sire Screen Hero ch. 2004	Running Heroine b. 1993	Sunday Silence	Wishing Well
Sire Screen Hero ch. 2004	Running Heroine b. 1993	Dyna Actress	Northern Taste
Sire Screen Hero ch. 2004	Running Heroine b. 1993	Dyna Actress	Model Sport
Dam Heilong Xing dkb/br. 1999 (FNo: 1-p)	Kyowa Alysheba b. 1990	Alysheba	Alydar
Dam Heilong Xing dkb/br. 1999 (FNo: 1-p)	Kyowa Alysheba b. 1990	Alysheba	Bel Sheba
Dam Heilong Xing dkb/br. 1999 (FNo: 1-p)	Kyowa Alysheba b. 1990	Sulemeif	Northern Dancer
Dam Heilong Xing dkb/br. 1999 (FNo: 1-p)	Kyowa Alysheba b. 1990	Sulemeif	Barely Even
Dam Heilong Xing dkb/br. 1999 (FNo: 1-p)	Happy Hien ch. 1987	Manado	Captain's Gig
Dam Heilong Xing dkb/br. 1999 (FNo: 1-p)	Happy Hien ch. 1987	Manado	Slipstream
Dam Heilong Xing dkb/br. 1999 (FNo: 1-p)	Happy Hien ch. 1987	Buzen Fubuki	Sedan
Dam Heilong Xing dkb/br. 1999 (FNo: 1-p)	Happy Hien ch. 1987	Buzen Fubuki	Tosa Queen

- Gold Actor is an inbred by 5 × 5 x 4 to Northern Dancer (Sulemeif's, Danzig's and Northern Taste's sire) and 5 × 5 to Hail to Reason (Roberto's and Halo's sire).
