= Baring Bingham Novices' Hurdle =

Hurdle horse race in Britain

- Class: Grade 1
- Location: Cheltenham Racecourse; Cheltenham, England
- Inaugurated: 1971
- Race type: Hurdle race
- Sponsor: Turners
- Website: Cheltenham

Race information
- Distance: 2m 5f (4,225 metres)
- Surface: Turf
- Track: Left-handed
- Qualification: Four-years-old and up
- Weight: 10 st 9 lb (4yo); 11 st 7 lb (5yo+); Allowances; 7 lb for fillies and mares
- Purse: £150,000 (2025); 1st: £84,405

Baring Bingham Novices' Hurdle
2026
| King Rasko Grey | Act Of Innocence | Zeus Power |

Previous years
2025
The New Lion | The Yellow Clay | Final Demand
2024
Ballyburn | Jimmy Du Seuil | Ile Atlantique
2023
Impaire Et Passe | Gaelic Warrior | Champ Kiely
2022
Sir Gerhard | Three Stripe Life | Whatdeawant
2021
Bob Olinger | Gaillard Du Mesnil | Bravemansgame

2020-2011
2020
Envoi Allen | Easywork | The Big Getaway
2019
City Island | Champ | Bright Forecast
2018
Samcro | Black Op | Next Destination
2017
Willoughby Court | Neon Wolf | Messire Des Obeaux
2016
Yorkhill | Yanworth | Its'afreebee
2015
Windsor Park | Parlour Games | Nichols Canyon
2014
Faugheen | Ballyalton | Rathvinden
2013
The New One | Rule The World | Pont Alexandre
2012
Simonsig | Felix Yonger | Monksland
2011
First Lieutenant | Rock on Ruby | So Young

2010-2001
2010
Peddlers Cross | Reve De Sivola | Rite of Passage
2009
Mikael D'haguenet | Karabak | Diamond Harry
2008
Fiveforthree | Venalmar | Trafford Lad
2007
Massini's Maguire | Tidal Bay | Catch Me
2006
Nicanor | Denman | Refinement
2005
No Refuge | Racing Demon | Our Ben
2004
Fundamentalist | Inglis Drever | Grey Report
2003
Hardy Eustace | Pizarro | Lord Sam
2002
Galileo | Over The Bar I | Lanzerac

2000-1991
2000
Monsignor | No Discount | Gentle Rivage
1999
Barton | Artadoin Lad | Winston Run
1998
French Holly | Torboy | Cloone Bridge
1997
Istabraq | Mighty Moss | Daraydan
1996
Urubande | Go-Informal | Karshi
1995
Putty Road | Berude Not To | Treble Bob
1994
Danoli | Corrouge | Brief Gale
1993
Gaelstrom | Cardinal Red | Lord Relic
1992
Thetford Forest | Muse | Ashfold Copse
1991
Crystal Spirit | Minorettes Girl | Super Sense

1990-1988
1990
Regal Ambition | Judges Fancy | Tom's Little Bet
1989
Sayfar's Lad | Trapper John | Knight Oil
1988
Rebel Song | Slalom | Rustle

The Baring Bingham Novices' Hurdle (currently known as the Turners Novices' Hurdle for sponsorship reasons) is a Grade 1 National Hunt hurdle race in Great Britain which is open to horses aged four years or older. It is run on the Old Course at Cheltenham over a distance of about 2 miles and 5 furlongs (4,225 metres), and during its running there are ten hurdles to be jumped. The race is for novice hurdlers, and it is scheduled to take place each year during the Cheltenham Festival in March.

== History ==
The event was established in 1971, and it was initially called the Aldsworth Hurdle. The insurance company Sun Alliance (later Royal & SunAlliance) began sponsoring the race in 1974, and it became known as the Sun Alliance Novices' Hurdle. This association continued until 2006, and for the following three years the event was backed by Ballymore Properties.

There were high winds on the day of the planned running in 2008, so the Ballymore Properties Novices' Hurdle was rescheduled and run on Cheltenham's New Course. A new sponsor, Neptune Investment Management, began supporting the race in 2010. Ballymore resumed sponsorship from the 2018 running.

The registered (non-sponsored) title of the race is now the Baring Bingham Novices' Hurdle. This is in honour of Baring Bingham, a developer who purchased Prestbury Park in 1898, and organised the first Cheltenham Festival in 1902.

== Records ==
Leading jockey (4 wins):

- Ruby Walsh – Fiveforthree (2008), Mikael d'Haguenet (2009), Faugheen (2014), Yorkhill (2016)
- Paul Townend - Sir Gerhard (2022), Impaire Et Passe (2023), Ballyburn (2024), King Rasko Grey (2026)

Leading trainer (8 wins):

- Willie Mullins – Fiveforthree (2008), Mikael d'Haguenet (2009), Faugheen (2014), Yorkhill (2016), Sir Gerhard (2022), Impaire Et Passe (2023), Ballyburn (2024), King Rasko Grey (2026)

== Winners ==
| Year | Winner | Age | Jockey | Trainer |
|---|---|---|---|---|
| 1971 | Midsprite | 5 | Macer Gifford | Harry Thomson Jones |
| 1972 | Even Dawn | 5 | Ron Hyett | Katie Gaze |
| 1973 | Willie Wumpkins | 5 | Pat Colville | Adrian Maxwell |
| 1974 | Brown Lad | 8 | Ron Barry | Paddy Osborne |
| 1975 | Davy Lad | 5 | Dessie Hughes | Mick O'Toole |
| 1976 | Parkhill | 5 | Dessie Hughes | Mick O'Toole |
| 1977 | Counsel Cottage | 6 | Sean Treacy | Paddy Mullins |
| 1978 | Mr Kildare | 5 | Tommy Carmody | Liam Browne |
| 1979 | Venture to Cognac | 6 | Oliver Sherwood (Note: amateur jockey) | Fred Winter |
| 1980 | Drumlargan | 6 | Tommy Ryan | Edward O'Grady |
| 1981 | Gaye Chance | 6 | Sam Morshead | Fred Rimell |
| 1982 | Mister Donovan | 6 | Tommy Ryan | Edward O'Grady |
| 1983 | Sabin du Loir | 4 | Graham Bradley | Michael Dickinson |
| 1984 | Fealty | 4 | Seamus O'Neill | Peter Brookshaw |
| 1985 | Asir | 5 | Ronnie Beggan | Paul Kelleway |
| 1986 | Ten Plus | 6 | Kevin Mooney | Fulke Walwyn |
| 1987 | The West Awake | 6 | Simon Sherwood | Oliver Sherwood |
| 1988 | Rebel Song | 6 | Simon Sherwood | Oliver Sherwood |
| 1989 | Sayfar's Lad | 5 | Mark Perrett | Martin Pipe |
| 1990 | Regal Ambition | 6 | Peter Scudamore | Martin Pipe |
| 1991 | Crystal Spirit | 4 | Jimmy Frost | Ian Balding |
| 1992 | Thetford Forest | 5 | Richard Dunwoody | David Nicholson |
| 1993 | Gaelstrom | 6 | Carl Llewellyn | Nigel Twiston-Davies |
| 1994 | Danoli | 6 | Charlie Swan | Tom Foley |
| 1995 | Putty Road | 5 | Norman Williamson | David Nicholson |
| 1996 | Urubande | 6 | Charlie Swan | Aidan O'Brien |
| 1997 | Istabraq | 5 | Charlie Swan | Aidan O'Brien |
| 1998 | French Holly | 7 | Andrew Thornton | Ferdy Murphy |
| 1999 | Barton | 6 | Lorcan Wyer | Tim Easterby |
| 2000 | Monsignor | 6 | Norman Williamson | Mark Pitman |
| 2001 | Abandoned due to a foot-and-mouth outbreak |
| 2002 | Galileo | 6 | Jason Maguire | Tom George |
| 2003 | Hardy Eustace | 6 | Kieran Kelly | Dessie Hughes |
| 2004 | Fundamentalist | 6 | Carl Llewellyn | Nigel Twiston-Davies |
| 2005 | No Refuge | 5 | Graham Lee | Howard Johnson |
| 2006 | Nicanor | 5 | Paul Carberry | Noel Meade |
| 2007 | Massini's Maguire | 6 | Richard Johnson | Philip Hobbs |
| 2008 | Fiveforthree | 6 | Ruby Walsh | Willie Mullins |
| 2009 | Mikael d'Haguenet | 5 | Ruby Walsh | Willie Mullins |
| 2010 | Peddlers Cross | 5 | Jason Maguire | Donald McCain, Jr. |
| 2011 | First Lieutenant | 6 | Davy Russell | Mouse Morris |
| 2012 | Simonsig | 6 | Barry Geraghty | Nicky Henderson |
| 2013 | The New One | 5 | Sam Twiston-Davies | Nigel Twiston-Davies |
| 2014 | Faugheen | 6 | Ruby Walsh | Willie Mullins |
| 2015 | Windsor Park | 6 | Davy Russell | Dermot Weld |
| 2016 | Yorkhill | 6 | Ruby Walsh | Willie Mullins |
| 2017 | Willoughby Court | 6 | David Bass | Ben Pauling |
| 2018 | Samcro | 6 | Jack Kennedy | Gordon Elliott |
| 2019 | City Island | 6 | Mark Walsh | Martin Brassil |
| 2020 | Envoi Allen | 6 | Davy Russell | Gordon Elliott |
| 2021 | Bob Olinger | 6 | Rachael Blackmore | Henry de Bromhead |
| 2022 | Sir Gerhard | 7 | Paul Townend | Willie Mullins |
| 2023 | Impaire Et Passe | 5 | Paul Townend | Willie Mullins |
| 2024 | Ballyburn | 6 | Paul Townend | Willie Mullins |
| 2025 | The New Lion | 6 | Harry Skelton | Dan Skelton |
| 2026 | King Rasko Grey | 6 | Paul Townend | Willie Mullins |

== See also ==
- Horse racing in Great Britain
- List of British National Hunt races
