= 1987 Kentucky Derby =

Horse race

113th Kentucky Derby
- Kentucky Derby
- Grade I stakes race
- Location: Churchill Downs
- Date: May 2, 1987
- Winning horse: Alysheba
- Jockey: Chris McCarron
- Trainer: Jack Van Berg
- Owner: Dorothy Scharbauer; Pamela Scharbauer
- Conditions: Fast
- Surface: Dirt
- Attendance: 130,532

The 1987 Kentucky Derby was the 113th running of the Kentucky Derby. The race took place on May 2, 1987, with 130,532 people in attendance.

== Full results ==
| Finished | Post | Horse | Jockey | Trainer | Owner | Time / behind |
|---|---|---|---|---|---|---|
| 1st | 4 | Alysheba | Chris McCarron | Jack Van Berg | Dorothy & Pamela Scharbauer | 2:03.40 |
| 2nd | 9 | Bet Twice | Craig Perret | Warren A. Croll Jr. | B.P. Levy & Cisely Stable | |
| 3rd | 14 | Avies Copy | Mickey Solomone | David Kassen | T. Brown Badgett | |
| 4th | 3 | Cryptoclearance | Jose Santos | Flint S. Schulhofer | Philip Teinowitz | |
| 5th | 12 | Templar Hill | Greg W. Hutton | Paul D. Seefeldt | Ervin J. Kowitz | |
| 6th | 2 | Gulch | Willie Shoemaker | LeRoy Jolley | Peter M. Brant | |
| 7th | 2b | Leo Castelli | Jacinto Vásquez | LeRoy Jolley | Peter M. Brant | |
| 8th | 7 | Candi's Gold | Sandy Hawley | Edwin J. Gregson | Royal Lines | |
| 9th | 10 | Conquistarose | Jerry D. Bailey | Woody Stephens | Henryk de Kwiatkowski | |
| 10th | 1x | On the Line | Gary Stevens | D. Wayne Lukas | Eugene V. Klein | |
| 11th | 8 | Shawklit Won | Richard Migliore | Frank LaBoccetta | Edward Anchel | |
| 12th | 5 | Masterful Advocate | Laffit Pincay, Jr. | Joseph Manzi | H.J. Belles & D.A. Leveton | |
| 13th | 1 | War | Herb McCauley | D. Wayne Lukas | Tom Gentry | |
| 14th | 13 | Momentus | Don Brumfield | Wallace Dollase | Chillingworth & Duckett et al. | |
| 15th | 11 | No More Flowers | Walter Guerra | Happy Alter | Arthur I. Appleton | |
| 16th | 1a | Capote | Ángel Cordero Jr. | D. Wayne Lukas | Klein, French & Beal | |
| DNF | 6 | Demons Begone | Pat Day | Phil Hauswald | Loblolly Stable | |

- Winning Breeder: Preston Madden; (KY)

== Payout ==
| Post | Horse | Win | Place | Show |
|---|---|---|---|---|
| 4 | Alysheba | US$18.80 | 8.00 | 6.20 |
| 9 | Bet Twice | | 10.00 | 7.20 |
| 14 | Avies Copy | | | 6.80 |

- $2 Exacta: (4–9) Paid $109.60
