= Capote (horse) =

American-bred Thoroughbred racehorse

- Sire: Seattle Slew
- Grandsire: Bold Reasoning
- Dam: Too Bald
- Damsire: Bald Eagle
- Sex: Stallion
- Foaled: 1984
- Country: United States
- Colour: Dark Bay
- Breeder: North Ridge Farm
- Owner: Barry A. Beal, Lloyd R. French, Jr. & Eugene V. Klein
- Trainer: D. Wayne Lukas
- Record: 10: 3-0-1
- Earnings: $714,470

Major wins
- Norfolk Stakes (1986) Breeders' Cup wins: Breeders' Cup Juvenile (1986)

Awards
- U.S. Champion 2-Yr-Old Colt (1986)
- Last updated on September 5, 2007

Capote (March 25, 1984–August 24, 2007) was an American Thoroughbred racehorse. He was best known for his achievements in 1986 when he was voted American Champion Two-Year-Old Colt.

== Background ==
Bred by Franklin Groves' North Ridge Farm near Lexington, Kentucky, Capote was out of the mare Too Bald, a daughter of the 1960 American Champion Older Male Horse, Bald Eagle. He was sired by the 1977 U.S. Triple Crown champion, Seattle Slew. Trainer D. Wayne Lukas acquired Capote for $800,000 at the 1985 Keeneland July yearling sale for the partnership of Barry A. Beal, Lloyd R. French, Jr. and prominent horseman Eugene V. Klein.

== Racing career ==
At age two in 1986, Capote made four starts, winning three times. He won the Grade I Norfolk Stakes at Santa Anita Park, then on the same track, he competed in the Breeders' Cup Juvenile against a field that included Gulch, winner of that year's Grade I Belmont Futurity and Hopeful Stakes; Polish Navy, who had won the Grade I Champagne and Cowdin Stakes; future American Horse of the Year and Hall of Famer Alysheba; and Bet Twice, who went on to win the 1987 Belmont Stakes. Ridden by Laffit Pincay, Jr., Capote took the lead early in the race and held it throughout to win by 1¼ lengths.

Capote's performances in 1986 earned him U.S. Champion 2-Yr-Old Colt honors, and he went into the 1987 racing season as the winter book favorite for the 1987 Kentucky Derby. However, the colt's three-year-old campaign was not a success. Out of six starts, his best finish was a third. Capote also finished sixteenth in a seventeen-horse field in the Kentucky Derby.

== Stud record ==
Retired to stud duty, from 1989 through to the end of 1991, Capote stood at the famed Calumet Farm, which had purchased a fifty percent interest in him. The bankruptcy of Calumet resulted in Morven Stud of Charlottesville, Virginia, eventually acquiring the fifty percent share as an equal partner with Capote's original owners. His owners then moved him to Three Chimneys Farm in Midway, Kentucky.

Before being pensioned in November 2003 as a result of neurological problems, Capote was the sire of 21 graded stakes winners among 62 stakes winners. His progeny included Grade I winners Capote Belle, Matty G., Agincourt, and:

- Basim - won the 1992 Anglesey Stakes and was voted Ireland's 2-year-old Champion;
- Boston Harbor - in 1996 he duplicated Capote's success, winning the Breeders' Cup Juvenile and earning U.S. Champion 2-year-old honors;
- Surfing Home - multiple Grade I winner, 1995 Horse of the Year in South Africa.

== Death ==
Capote died at age twenty-three on August 24, 2007, and is buried at Three Chimneys Farm.

== Pedigree ==
Pedigree of Capote (USA), dark bay colt, 1984
Sire Seattle Slew (USA) 1974	Bold Reasoning (USA) (USA); 1968	Boldnesian (USA)	Bold Ruler (USA)
Sire Seattle Slew (USA) 1974	Bold Reasoning (USA) (USA); 1968	Boldnesian (USA)	Alanesian (USA)
Sire Seattle Slew (USA) 1974	Bold Reasoning (USA) (USA); 1968	Reason To Earn (USA)	Hail To Reason (USA)
Sire Seattle Slew (USA) 1974	Bold Reasoning (USA) (USA); 1968	Reason To Earn (USA)	Sailing Home (USA)
Sire Seattle Slew (USA) 1974	My Charmer (USA); 1969	Poker (USA)	Round Table (USA)
Sire Seattle Slew (USA) 1974	My Charmer (USA); 1969	Poker (USA)	Glamour (USA)
Sire Seattle Slew (USA) 1974	My Charmer (USA); 1969	Fair Charmer (USA)	Jet Action (USA)
Sire Seattle Slew (USA) 1974	My Charmer (USA); 1969	Fair Charmer (USA)	Myrtle Charm (USA)
Dam Too Bald (USA) 1964	Bald Eagle (USA); 1955	Nasrullah (GB)†	Nearco (ITY)
Dam Too Bald (USA) 1964	Bald Eagle (USA); 1955	Nasrullah (GB)†	Mumtaz Begum (FRA)
Dam Too Bald (USA) 1964	Bald Eagle (USA); 1955	Siama (USA)	Tiger (USA)
Dam Too Bald (USA) 1964	Bald Eagle (USA); 1955	Siama (USA)	China Face (USA)
Dam Too Bald (USA) 1964	Hidden Talent (USA); 1956	Dark Star (USA)	Royal Gem (AUS)
Dam Too Bald (USA) 1964	Hidden Talent (USA); 1956	Dark Star (USA)	Isolde (USA)
Dam Too Bald (USA) 1964	Hidden Talent (USA); 1956	Dangerous Dame (GB)	Nasrullah (GB)†
Dam Too Bald (USA) 1964	Hidden Talent (USA); 1956	Dangerous Dame (GB)	Lady Kells (IRE)

† indicates inbreeding
