= Charter Party (disambiguation) =

Charter Party may refer to:

- Charter party, a type of maritime contract
- Charter Party (horse), a racehorse
- Charter Committee, an independent political organization in Cincinnati, Ohio
- Pirate code
