= 1988 Cheltenham Gold Cup =

The 1988 Cheltenham Gold Cup was a horse race which took place at Cheltenham on 17 March 1988. It was the 61st running of the Cheltenham Gold Cup, and was won by Charter Party. The winner was ridden by Richard Dunwoody and trained by David Nicholson. The pre-race favourite Playschool pulled-up before fence 20.

The event was marred by the death of the former winner Forgive 'n Forget, who broke a leg during the race and was euthanised.

== Race details ==
- Sponsor: Tote
- Winner's prize money: £61,960.00
- Going: Soft
- Number of runners: 15
- Winner's time: 6m 58.9s

== Full result ==
	*	Horse	Age	Jockey	Trainer ^{†}	SP
1		Charter Party	10	Richard Dunwoody	David Nicholson	10/1
2	6	Cavvies Clown	8	Simon Sherwood	David Elsworth	6/1
3	10	Beau Ranger	10	Peter Scudamore	Martin Pipe	33/1
4	3	Nupsala	9	André Pommier	François Doumen (FR)	8/1
5	3	Yahoo	7	Tom Morgan	John Edwards	12/1
6	nk	West Tip	11	Micky Hammond	Michael Oliver	80/1
7		Kildimo	8	Graham Bradley	Toby Balding	6/1
8		Golden Friend	10	Dermot Browne	Mercy Rimell	40/1
9		Run and Skip	10	Peter Hobbs	John Spearing	50/1
PU	Fence 20	Playschool	10	Paul Nicholls	David Barons	100/30 fav
PU	Fence 19	Forgive 'n Forget	11	Mark Dwyer	Jimmy FitzGerald	8/1
Fell	Fence 19	Rhyme 'n' Reason	9	Brendan Powell	David Elsworth	11/1
PU	Fence 17	Cybrandian	10	Chris Grant	Peter Easterby	40/1
PU	Fence 17	Foyle Fisherman	9	Richard Rowe	Josh Gifford	50/1
Fell	Fence 15	Stearsby	9	Graham McCourt	Rod Simpson	100/1

* The distances between the horses are shown in lengths or shorter. nk = neck; PU = pulled-up
† Trainers are based in Great Britain unless indicated

== Winner's details ==
Further details of the winner, Charter Party:

- Foaled: 1978 in Ireland
- Sire: Document; Dam: Ahoy There (Little Buskins)
- Owner: Claire Smith and Jenny Mould
- Breeder: A. W. Riddell Martin
