= Cryptoclearance =

American-bred Thoroughbred racehorse

- Sire: Fappiano
- Grandsire: Mr. Prospector
- Dam: Naval Orange
- Damsire: Hoist The Flag
- Sex: Stallion
- Foaled: 1984
- Country: United States
- Color: Dark Bay/Brown
- Breeder: George G. Farm, Inc.
- Owner: Philip Teinowitz
- Trainer: Flint S. Schulhofer
- Record: 44: 12-10-7
- Earnings: US$3,376,327

Major wins
- Everglades Stakes (1987); Florida Derby (1987); Pegasus Handicap (1987); Paterson Handicap (1988); Hawthorne Gold Cup (1988, 1989); Widener Handicap (1989); Donn Handicap (1989)

Cryptoclearance (April 9, 1984 in Kentucky – September 24, 2009) was an American Thoroughbred racehorse who won the Florida Derby in 1987 and the Hawthorne Gold Cup in 1988 and 1989.

== Racing career ==
Trained by future Hall of Fame trainer Scotty Schulhofer, Cryptoclearance raced for three years, winning 12 of his 44 starts including four Grade 1 races.

In 1987, Cryptoclearance won the Florida Derby before coming fourth in the Kentucky Derby to Alysheba, third in the Preakness Stakes to Alysheba, and second in the Belmont Stakes to Bet Twice.

== Retirement and Breeding Career ==
Retired to stud duty, Cryptoclearance stood at Margaux Farm in Midway, Kentucky.

His top offspring include:

- Victory Gallop, winner of the 1998 Belmont Stakes Classic and voted 1999 American Champion Older Male Horse. Retired from racing with career earnings of $3,505,895.
- Cryptocloser, 1997 Canadian Champion 3-Year-Old Male Horse
- Volponi, winner of the 2002 Breeders' Cup Classic. Retired with career earnings of $3,187,232.

== Pedigree ==
Pedigree of Cryptoclearance, brown stallion, April 9, 1984
Sire Fappiano	Mr. Prospector	Raise a Native	Native Dancer
Sire Fappiano	Mr. Prospector	Raise a Native	Raise You
Sire Fappiano	Mr. Prospector	Gold Digger	Nashua
Sire Fappiano	Mr. Prospector	Gold Digger	Sequence
Sire Fappiano	Killaloe	Dr. Fager	Rough'n Tumble
Sire Fappiano	Killaloe	Dr. Fager	Aspidistra
Sire Fappiano	Killaloe	Grand Splendor	Correlation
Sire Fappiano	Killaloe	Grand Splendor	Cequillo
Dam Naval Orange	Hoist The Flag	Tom Rolfe	Ribot
Dam Naval Orange	Hoist The Flag	Tom Rolfe	Pocahontas
Dam Naval Orange	Hoist The Flag	Wavy Navy	War Admiral
Dam Naval Orange	Hoist The Flag	Wavy Navy	Triomphe
Dam Naval Orange	Mock Orange	Dedicate	Princequillo
Dam Naval Orange	Mock Orange	Dedicate	Dini
Dam Naval Orange	Mock Orange	Alablue	Blue Larkspur
Dam Naval Orange	Mock Orange	Alablue	Double Time (family: 4-m)
