= Bel Sheba =

American-bred Thoroughbred racehorse

- Sire: Lt. Stevens
- Grandsire: Nantallah
- Dam: Belthazar
- Damsire: War Admiral
- Sex: Mare
- Foaled: 1970
- Country: United States
- Colour: Brown
- Breeder: Preston W. Madden
- Owner: Preston W. Madden
- Trainer: Alfred P. Smithwick
- Record: 22: 5-3-2
- Earnings: $34,031

Bel Sheba (January 29, 1970 – 1995) was an American thoroughbred racehorse. She was sired by the middle-distance stallion Lt. Stevens, out of Belthazar, daughter of the great War Admiral.

Bel Sheba raced 22 times and was trained by Hall of Fame jockey and trainer A. P. (Paddy) Smithwick. Her most notable race result was a third in the 1972 Adirondack Stakes at Saratoga Race Course.

As a broodmare, however, she was more productive. Retired to Hamburg Place Farm, she is best known as the dam of Kentucky Derby and Preakness Stakes winner Alysheba.
