= Macer Gifford =

British medic and trader (born 1987)

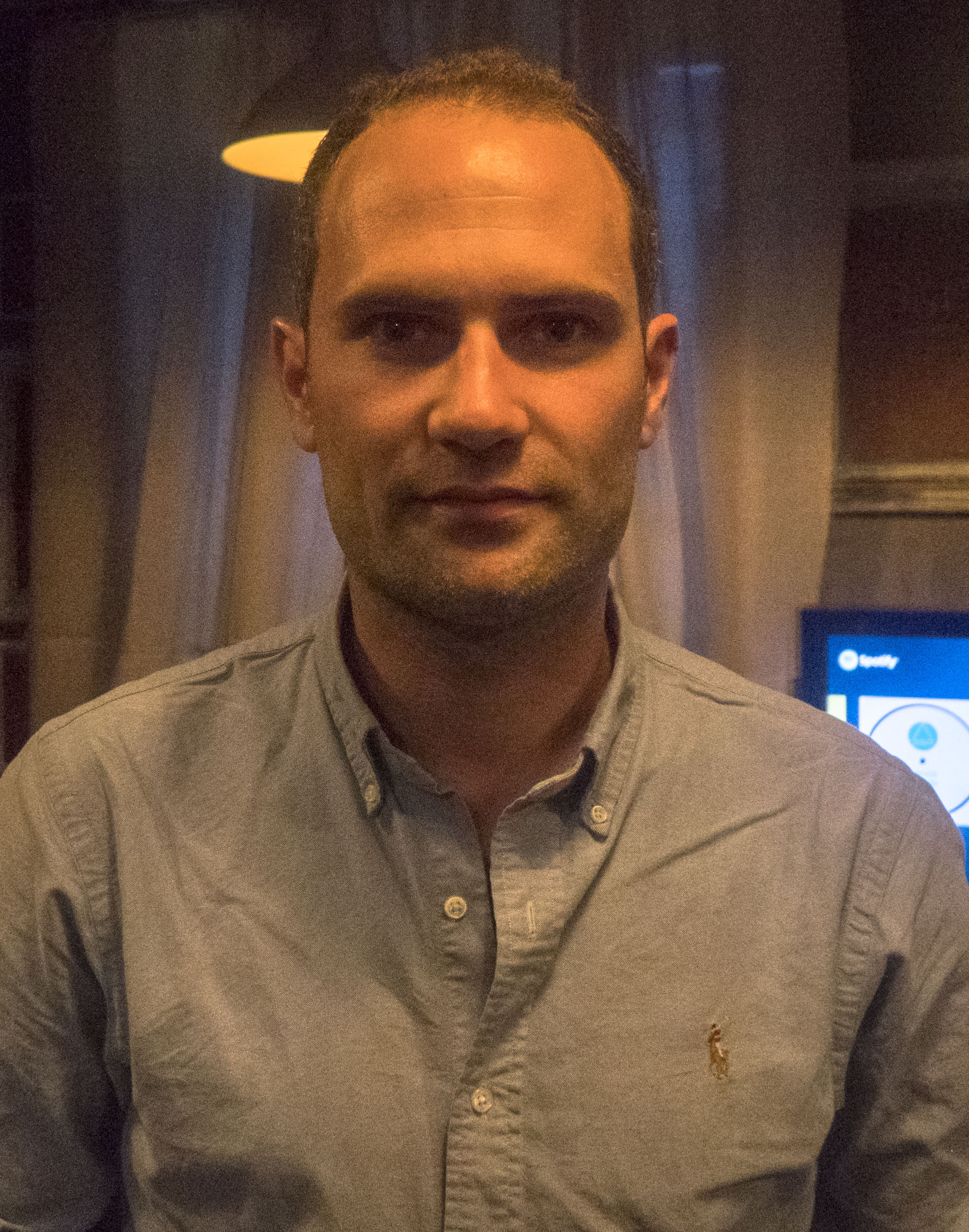
- Gifford in 2017.
- Born: Harry Rowe; 1987 (age 38–39); Cambridge, England, United Kingdom
- Military career
- Allegiance: Syrian Democratic Forces; Ukraine
- Branch: People's Defense Units; Ukrainian Foreign Legion
- Service years: 2015–2017; 2022–present
- Unit: Nightingale Squadron
- Conflicts: Syrian civil war; Manbij offensive (2016); Southern Raqqa offensive; Russo-Ukrainian War

Harry Rowe (born 1987), known as Macer Gifford, is a British volunteer fighter and medic who served in the Ukrainian Foreign Legion during the Russo-Ukrainian War. He previously volunteered for the Kurdish YPG in their fight against the Islamic State.

== Early life and career ==
Gifford is from Cambridge. He has previously been a Conservative Party councillor and was a currency trader. He previously had no military training.

== Volunteer ==
Between mid-2015 and 2017, Gifford fought in Syria to fight with the Kurdish YPG militia against the Islamic State group. He spent five months fighting with the YPG in 2015 before returning to the UK in 2015. In 2016 he completed a second tour with the YPG in Syria, taking part in fighting around Manbij with the Syrian Democratic Forces (SDF), who were clearing the city of Manbij of ISIS forces. He took his identity from National Hunt jockey Macer Gifford, the brother of four-time champion jockey Josh Gifford.

After returning from Syria in 2015, he was initially barred from speaking at the University of London Union because the Union's events officer feared that his talk might encourage others to travel to fight in Syria. The decision was reversed after a petition calling on the Union to let Gifford speak was signed by 1,400 people and the Metropolitan Police advised the Union that it was 'legally acceptable' for the event to take place.

Gifford joined the Ukrainian Army in 2022, and fought for two years in the Russo-Ukrainian War. In Ukraine, Gifford is reportedly "running a battlefield first aid training programme that he first pioneered with the Kurds [in Syria]."
