= Pat Colville =

American visual artist

- Born: 1931 (age 94–95); New Orleans, Louisiana
- Education: University of Houston, University of Oklahoma

Pat Colville (born New Orleans, Louisiana, 1931) is a contemporary American artist who works in painting, drawing, and sculpture. Her work holds a commitment to abstraction and is influenced by early Asian landscape paintings.

== Early life and education ==
Colville was born in New Orleans, Louisiana, in 1931, and moved to Houston at the age of 17. Colville received her BS from the University of Houston in 1952 and her MFA from the University of Oklahoma in 1977.

== Work ==
Colville has presented solo exhibitions at the New Orleans Museum of Art and Contemporary Arts Museum Houston and has also exhibited her work at the Art Museum of South Texas and the San Antonio Museum of Art.

Colville has taught extensively, including 20 years at the Cooper Union in New York as well as Sarah Lawrence College in New York, Houston Museum School, St. Thomas University, The University of Houston, and Bennington College.

She is the recipient of two National Endowment for the Arts Grants, a Pollock-Krasner Foundation Grant, a Benjamin Altman Award, a New York State Creative Arts Program Fellowship, and an American Association of University Women Fellowship.

Colville is represented by Moody Gallery (Houston).

== Selected solo exhibitions ==
- 2023 Drawings from the Jasper Mountain / Li Po series at Anne Cooper Occasional Gallery, Los Ranchos, New Mexico
- 2016 Hardscapes at Moody Gallery, Houston, Texas
- 2014 A Celebration: Five Decades of Work at Galveston Arts Center, Galveston, Texas
- 1992 at Fay Gold Gallery, Atlanta, Georgia
- 1989/90 at Gloria Luria Gallery, Miami, Florida
- 1980 at Condeso/Lawler Gallery, New York, New York
- 1979 Pat Colville: Recent Works at Contemporary Arts Museum Houston, Houston, Texas
- 1974 at New Orleans Museum of Art, New Orleans, Louisiana

== Selected group exhibitions ==
- 2022 Texas Artists: Women of Abstraction at Art Museum of South Texas, Corpus Christi, Texas
- 2020 Texas Women: A New History of Abstract Art at San Antonio Museum of Art, San Antonio, Texas
- 2008 The 183rd Annual: Invitational Exhibition of Contemporary American Art at National Academy Museum, New York, New York
- 1989 Chicago International Art Exposition, Chicago, Illinois

== Selected collections ==
- Art Museum of Southeast Texas, Beaumont, Texas
- Dallas Museum of Art, Dallas, Texas
- The McNay, San Antonio, Texas
- Museum of Fine Arts, Houston, Houston, Texas
- Sarah Lawrence College, Bronxville, New York
