= Maori Venture =

British-bred Thoroughbred racehorse

- Breed: Thoroughbred
- Sire: St. Columbus
- Grandsire: Saint Crespin
- Dam: Moon Venture
- Damsire: Eastern Venture
- Sex: Gelding
- Foaled: 1976
- Country: United Kingdom
- Colour: Chestnut
- Breeder: Dai Morgan
- Owner: Jim Joel
- Trainer: Andrew Turnell

Major wins
- Mandarin Handicap Chase (1984, 1987); Grand National (1987)

Maori Venture (1976–2000) was a thoroughbred racehorse noted for winning the 1987 Grand National. The horse was so-named because breeder Dai Morgan had played rugby in New Zealand, home to the Māori.

An eleven-year-old owned by Jim Joel, trained by Andrew Turnell he was stabled in East Hendred, Oxfordshire. He was ridden by Steve Knight. Carrying 10 st 13 lb, Maori Venture won the race by five lengths at a price of 28/1 and in a time of 9 min 19.3 s. It was both Maori Venture's first and last race in a Grand National.

At the time of the race, owner Jim Joel was aged 92 and had been trying to win the Grand National since 1957. Maori Venture was retired from racing immediately after the race and given to his rider in the Grand National, Steve Knight.

Maori Venture died in 2000, aged 24.

== Grand National record ==
Grand National	Position	Jockey	Age	Weight	SP	Distance
1987	1st	Steve Knight	11	10-13	28/1	Won by 5 lengths
