= David Nicholson (horse racing) =

British jockey and trainer (1939–2006)

Personal information
- Born: 19 March 1939
- Died: 27 August 2006 (aged 67)
- Occupations: Jockey, Trainer

Horse racing career
- Sport: Horse racing

Racing awards
- British jump racing Champion Trainer (1993–94, 1994–95)

Honours
- David Nicholson Mares' Hurdle

Significant horses
- Mill House, Charter Party, Barton Bank, Viking Flagship, Anzum, Waterloo Boy.

David Nicholson (19 March 1939 – 27 August 2006) was a British National Hunt jockey and trainer. He was British jump racing Champion Trainer in the 1993–94 and 1994–95 seasons.

== Family and early life ==
Nicholson was born at Epsom in 1939. His father Frenchie Nicholson, was also a successful jockey and National Hunt trainer. Nicholson's mother, Diana, was the great-granddaughter of William Holman, who trained three Grand National winners. He went to Haileybury College but was mainly educated for a horse racing career in his father's stable. As a young lad Nicholson was nicknamed 'The Duke' by other stable staff because of his manner and his inability to carry out menial work at the stable due to asthma and allergies. The nickname remained with him throughout his life

== Horse racing career ==
Nicholson began as a flat racing jockey from the age of 12 but switched to National Hunt racing where his 6-foot height was better suited to the heavier weights carried by National Hunt jockeys. As a jockey he rode 583 winners over jumps between 1955 and 1974 and came third in the jockeys' championship in the 1964–65 season. His biggest win came in the Whitbread Gold Cup on Mill House in 1967. He rode the winner of the Welsh Grand National three years in succession from 1959 to 1961, and won four Cheltenham Festival races as a jockey.

Nicholson began training racehorses in 1968 while still a jockey. He was initially based at Condicote and had his first success when Arctic Coral won at Warwick in January 1969. He moved to a new stable, Jackdaws Castle, in 1992 after the failure of his business at Condicote. He continued to train there until his retirement in November 1999.

As a trainer he was one of the leading trainers in National Hunt racing during the 1980s and 1990s. He won the Cheltenham Gold Cup with Charter Party in 1988, the King George VI Chase with Barton Bank in 1993 and the Queen Mother Champion Chase with Viking Flagship in 1994 and 1995. He retired in 1999.

In 2008 an extra race was added to the Cheltenham Festival named the David Nicholson Mares' Hurdle in honour of Nicholson.

== Major wins as trainer ==
- Cheltenham Gold Cup - (1) - Charter Party (1988)
- King George VI Chase - (1) - Barton Bank (1993)
- Queen Mother Champion Chase - (2) - Viking Flagship (1994, 1995)
- Melling Chase - (2) - Viking Flagship (1995, 1996)
- Stayers' Hurdle - (1) - Anzum (1999)
- Christmas Hurdle - (1) - Mighty Mogul (1992)
- Triumph Hurdle - (2) - Solar Cloud (1986), Mysilv (1994)
- Sun Alliance Novices' Hurdle - (2) - Thetford Forest (1992), Putty Road (1995)
- Arkle Challenge Trophy - (1) - Waterloo Boy (1989)
- Sefton Novices' Hurdle - (3) - Barton Bank (1992), Corner Boy (1994), Forest Ivory (1997)
- Tingle Creek Chase - (5) - Long Engagement (1987, 1989), Waterloo Boy (1991, 1992), Viking Flagship (1994)
- Whitbread Gold Cup - (1)- Call it a Day (1998)
- Mackeson Gold Cup - (2) - Very Promising (1986), Another Coral (1991)

== See also ==
- David Nicholson Mares' Hurdle
