= Condicote =

Village in Gloucestershire, England

Coordinates: 51°57′10″N 1°46′51″W

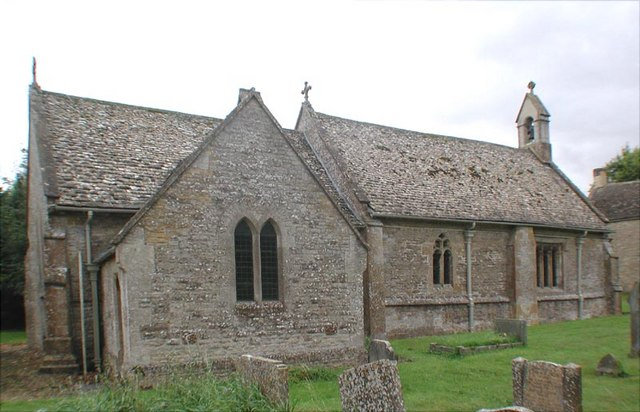
- Church of St Nicholas

- Location within Gloucestershire
- Population: 125
- OS grid reference: SP1528
- Shire county: Gloucestershire
- Region: South West
- Country: England
- Sovereign state: United Kingdom
- Post town: Cheltenham
- Postcode district: GL54
- Police: Gloucestershire
- Fire: Gloucestershire
- Ambulance: South Western
- UK Parliament: North Cotswolds

Condicote is a small village in Gloucestershire, England, near the A424 road and about 3 miles (5 km) north-west of Stow-on-the-Wold.

In 2023 the village had a population of 125.

Condicote was mentioned in the Domesday Book of 1086. There were fifteen households, and four estates, of which the tenants-in-chief were the Archbishop of York, the Bishop of Worcester, William Breakwolf and Durand of Gloucester.

The green is at the centre of the village, with the Church of St Nicholas on its north side. Roads run north-east and south-east towards Longborough and Stow-on-the-Wold respectively. About 300 yards (270 m) to the west is the Roman road Icknield Street. Its course is broken between where more recent roads reach it from north-west and south-west of the village.

The Victoria County History notes that the village is not associated with any famous people or events, and remarks: "Its remoteness and its physical conditions are of the kind to have made the life of the community as uneventful as it was austere."

== Church ==
The Church of St Nicholas, in the Diocese of Gloucester, is situated on the north side of the green, and dates from the 12th century; it is a Grade II* listed building. It is built of rubble with Cotswold stone. The 12th-century south doorway is ornamented with a tympanum and an arch of two orders, the outer with chevrons. Inside, there is a nave and chancel. The pointed chancel arch, which may have been rebuilt, has chevron decorations on the west side.

The church was remodelled in the 15th century. Restoration in 1888, by Mark Hookham of Stow-on-the-Wold, included the south porch and the bellcote above the gable at the west end.

== Wayside cross and holy well ==
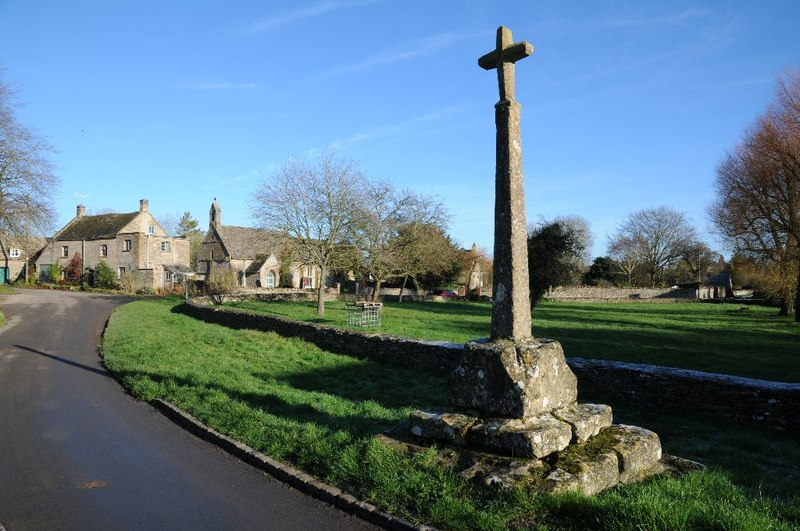
The wayside cross

At the west side of the green is a wayside cross, marking a holy well. It is a Grade II listed building, and is a scheduled monument. It probably dates from the late 14th century or early 15th century. There are three stone steps; above is the shaft of a cross, erected in 1864, and the finial, fitted in the mid 1970s. The well, on the east side of the cross, is covered by stone slabs. Until mains water came to the village in 1937 it was the chief supply of water. Before 1700 until the mid 19th century, there was a pond on the south side of the green, filled by the spring. The well was fitted with a pair of doors before 1868, and a pump was installed by 1882, which was still there in 1960.

== Prehistoric sites ==
A bowl barrow lies north-west of the village, near Icknield Street and just below the crest of a north-east facing hillside. It is a scheduled monument. It measures 30 metres (98 ft) north to south and 33 metres (108 ft) east to west, and is about 0.5 metres (1 ft 8 in) high.

Condicote Camp, a short distance east of the village, is a circular earthwork, thought to be for ritual purposes rather than for defence, enclosing about 4 acres (1.6 ha). The road to Longborough passes through it. It can now barely be discerned; in the early 19th century its banks were too steep to be easily climbed. Eubury Camp, north-east of the village, is a hillfort enclosing about 8 acres (3.2 ha). It has been eroded by ploughing. Both date from the Iron Age, and are scheduled monuments.
