= Willie Robinson (jockey) =

Irish jockey (1934–2020)

Personal information
- Born: 5 August 1934
- Died: August 2020 (aged 85–86)
- Occupation: Jockey

Horse racing career
- Sport: Horse racing

Major racing wins
- Champion Hurdle (1962, 1965); Cheltenham Gold Cup (1963); Grand National (1964); King George VI Chase (1963); Hennessy Gold Cup (1961, 1963, 1968)

Significant horses
- Mill House, Mandarin, Man of the West

Willie Robinson (5 August 1934 – August 2020) was an Irish jump jockey. He is the only jockey to have won the Hennessy Gold Cup three times. He is associated with the great steeplechaser, Mill House on whom he won both the Cheltenham Gold Cup and Hennessy. He also won the Champion Hurdle on Anzio and Kirriemuir and the Grand National on Team Spirit. Unusually for a jump jockey, he was also placed in the Derby.

He turned professional in 1956 and over the years had retainers with trainers John Corbett and Dan Moore. After several years in his native Ireland, he moved to England, and for nine years was stable jockey to champion trainer Fulke Walwyn. It was during this period he established a famous rivalry with fellow jockey Pat Taaffe – their respective mounts Mill House and Arkle met in several major races.

After retirement, he became involved in breeding and training.

== Personal life ==
In 1964, he married Susan Hall whose father, Cyril, managed the Irish Stud.

== Race victories ==
- Champion Hurdle – Anzio (1962), Kirriemuir (1965)
- Cheltenham Gold Cup – Mill House (1963)
- Grand National – Team Spirit (1964)
- King George VI Chase – Mill House (1963)
- Hennessy Gold Cup – Mandarin (1961), Mill House (1963), Man of the West (1968)
