= Gulch (horse) =

American-bred Thoroughbred racehorse

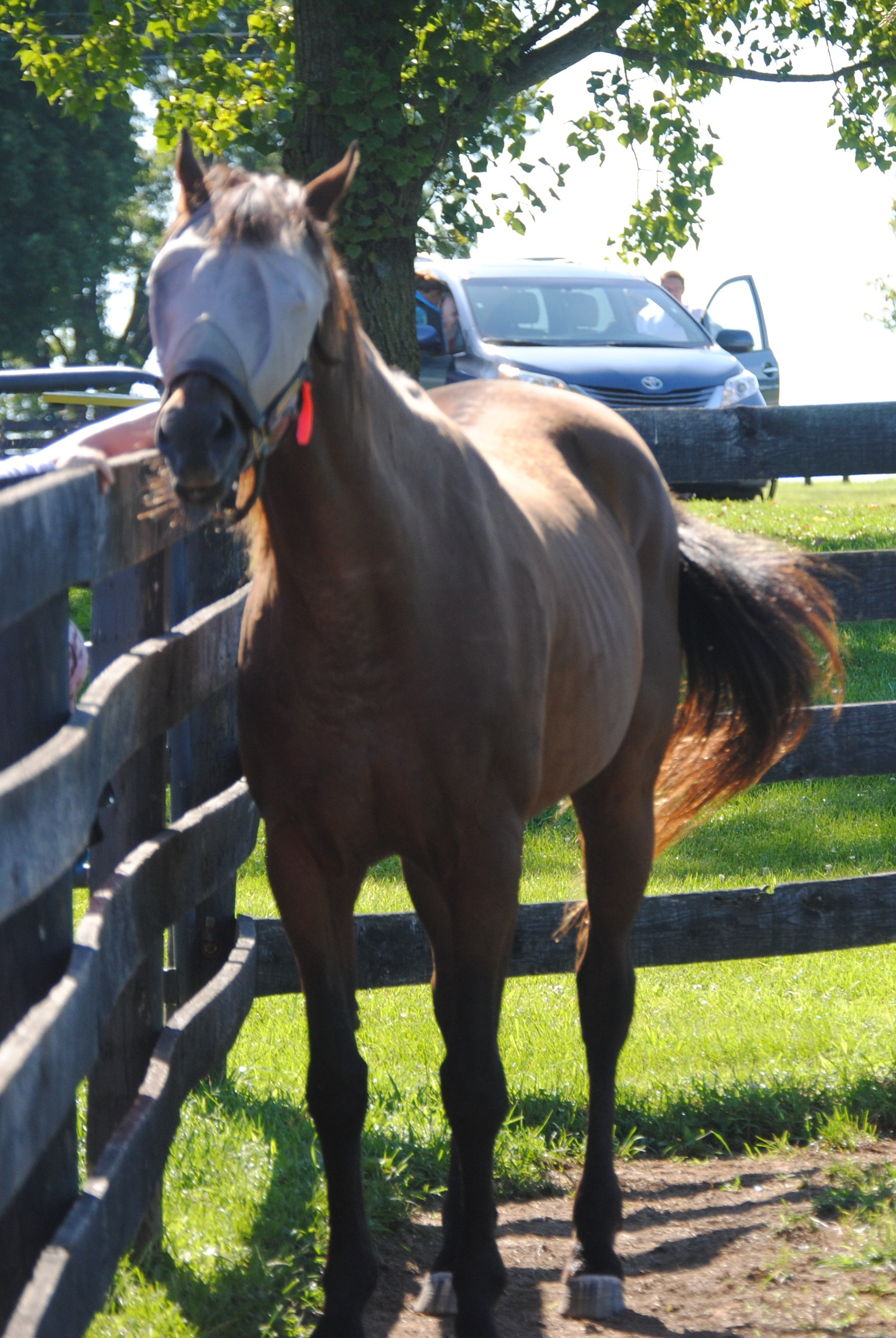
- Gulch at 31
- Sire: Mr. Prospector
- Grandsire: Raise a Native
- Dam: Jameela
- Damsire: Rambunctious
- Sex: Stallion
- Foaled: April 16, 1984
- Died: January 17, 2016 (aged 31)
- Country: United States
- Colour: Dark Bay
- Breeder: Peter M. Brant
- Owner: Peter M. Brant
- Trainer: 1) LeRoy Jolley; 2) D. Wayne Lukas
- Record: 32: 13-8-4
- Earnings: $3,095,521

Major wins
- Hopeful Stakes (1986); Futurity Stakes (1986); Saratoga Special Stakes (1986); Tremont Stakes (1986); Wood Memorial (1987); Bay Shore Stakes (1987); Metropolitan Handicap (1987, 1988); Carter Handicap (1988); Potrero Grande Handicap (1988); Breeders' Cup wins: Breeders' Cup Sprint (1988)

Awards
- American Champion Sprint Horse (1988)

Honours
- U.S. Racing Hall of Fame (2026)
- Last updated on April 23, 2026

Gulch (April 16, 1984 – January 17, 2016) was an American thoroughbred racehorse and sire. Owned and bred by Peter M. Brant, he was sired by the outstanding North American stud and graded stakes race winner Mr. Prospector out of the graded stakes race winning Rambunctious mare Jameela.

== Racing career ==
Guided by Hall of Fame trainer LeRoy Jolley, Gulch was a precocious two-year-old, winning the Grade I Hopeful Stakes at Saratoga Race Course with Ángel Cordero Jr. astride by 3 1/2 lengths.

He was undefeated that year going into the Breeders' Cup Juvenile, having won five starts in New York, but placed fifth to Capote, behind Alysheba and Bet Twice.

At three, being prepared for the Kentucky Derby, Gulch won the Wood Memorial with José A. Santos aboard. He also took the Grade II Bay Shore Stakes at Aqueduct Racetrack. Ridden by Willie Shoemaker in the 1987 Kentucky Derby, however, he raced wide in the stretch and placed sixth behind Alysheba. He also ran in the Preakness Stakes, where he finished fourth. He was third in the Belmont Stakes, in front of Alysheba but behind the winner, Bet Twice. In between the Preakness Stakes and the Belmont Stakes, he won the Metropolitan Handicap. He went on to win the race again the next year.

Racing at age four in 1988, he was transferred to trainer D. Wayne Lukas. Lukas shortened most of his races to 1 1/8 miles (1.8 km) or less, and Gulch won the Metropolitan Handicap, the Carter Handicap, and placed a very close second in the Whitney Handicap to Personal Ensign. He also won the Breeders' Cup Sprint that fall and was named winner of 1988's U.S. Outstanding Sprint Horse.

== Retirement ==
Retired in 1989, Gulch stood at stud at Lane's End Farm. In spring 2010, Lane's End donated him to the Old Friends Equine retirement facility in Georgetown, Kentucky. Following the death of Ogygian on March 14, 2015, Gulch became the oldest living horse at Old Friends. On January 17, 2016, he was euthanized at the age of 31.

His progeny include $4 million winner Eagle Cafe, Harayir, Nayef, 1995 U.S. Champion 3-Yr-Old Colt Thunder Gulch, The Cliff's Edge, and Brave Tender.
