= Ben Jones (jockey) =

Welsh jockey

Personal information
- Born: 16 November 1999 (age 26) Carmarthen, Wales
- Occupation: Jockey

Horse racing career
- Sport: Horse racing

Significant horses
- Handstands, The Jukebox Man

Ben Jones (born 16 November 1999) is a Welsh jockey who competes in National Hunt racing. He has won three Grade 1 races, including the 2025 King George VI Chase.

Jones grew up around horses in Carmarthen. His parents, Emily and Dai, were both amateur jockeys. His father was appointed clerk of the course at Chepstow Racecourse in 2023, having previously held the same position at Ffos Las Racecourse. After riding in point-to-points in Wales, Jones moved to Somerset when he was seventeen to join the yard of trainer Philip Hobbs. He switched from amateur to professional status in the summer of 2019 and, that November, won the Grade 3 Ladbrokes Trophy Chase on De Rasher Counter for trainer Emma Lavelle.

Jones secured his first victory at the Cheltenham Festival in March 2024, when Shakem Up'arry, trained by Ben Pauling, won the TrustATrader Plate Handicap Chase. At the beginning of the 2024/25 season, Jones was appointed stable jockey to Pauling. The Jukebox Man, trained by Pauling and owned by football manager Harry Redknapp, gave Jones his first Grade 1 success when winning the Kauto Star Novices' Chase at Kempton Park on Boxing Day 2024. A year later, Jones won the King George VI Chase on The Jukebox Man.

In August 2021, Jones married Laura Parker. The couple, who met at the yard of Philip Hobbs, have a daughter.

== Major wins ==
(United Kingdom) Great Britain

- Kauto Star Novices' Chase - (1) The Jukebox Man (2024)
- King George VI Chase - (1) The Jukebox Man (2025)
- Scilly Isles Novices' Chase - (1) Handstands (2025)
