= Charter Party (horse) =

Irish-bred Thoroughbred racehorse

- Racing silks of Claire Smith and Jenny Mould
- Sire: Document
- Grandsire: Narrator
- Dam: Ahoy There
- Damsire: Little Buskins
- Sex: Gelding
- Foaled: 4 May 1978
- Country: Ireland
- Colour: Bay
- Breeder: A W Riddell Martin
- Owner: Claire Smith and Jenny Mould
- Trainer: David Nicholson
- Record: 45: 12-6-6

Major wins
- National Hunt Handicap Chase (1986); Gainsborough Chase (1988); Cheltenham Gold Cup (1988)

Charter Party (4 May 1978 – June 2000) was an Irish-bred British-trained thoroughbred racehorse, best known for his win in the 1988 Cheltenham Gold Cup. He overcame persistent injury problems to win twelve races under National Hunt rules. He showed promise as a hurdler and as a Novice steeplechaser before recording his first major win in the 1986 National Hunt Handicap Chase. As a ten-year-old in 1988 he defeated Desert Orchid in the Gainsborough Chase, before taking the Gold Cup at Cheltenham in March. He never won again, but produced a fine effort to finish third on heavy ground in the 1989 Gold Cup.

== Background ==
Charter Party was a dark bay gelding with no white markings bred in Ireland by Avia Riddell Martin, who once described him as "the biggest, ugliest camel you have ever seen". He was the only racehorse of any consequence sired by Document, a half-brother of the St James's Palace Stakes winner Above Suspicion and the Ormonde Stakes winner Doutelle. Charter Party's dam Ahoy There also produced Current Call, who in turn produced the Sun Alliance Chase winner Nahthen Lad. Ahoy There was a female-line descendant of Lady Mischief, the grand-dam of The Derby winner Manna.

As a four-year-old, Charter Party was sent to the Doncaster Sales in May 1982 and was bought for 8,000 guineas by Raymond and Jenny Mould who owned the Grange Stud in Guiting Power, Gloucestershire. The Moulds later sold a half-share in the gelding to Colin and Claire Smith. During his racing career the gelding raced in the colours of Jenny Mould and Claire Smith. Charter Party was sent into training with David "The Duke" Nicholson at Condicote in Gloucestershire.

Throughout his racing career, Charter Party was hindered by injury problems related to the navicular bones in his feet. Although he was noted for his ability to sustain a fast gallop over extended distances he was prone to making mistakes in his jumping and often failed to complete the course.

== Racing career ==
=== Early career ===
Charter Party began his racing career as a Novice hurdler in the 1982/3 National Hunt season. He finished eighth on his debut at Towcester Racecourse and finished second at Nottingham before recording his first success at Haydock Park Racecourse. He went on to finish second at Newbury and fifth at Aintree before unseating his jockey Peter Scudamore when ten lengths at Newcastle. When switched to novice chasing he was beaten in his first three races before being stepped up in distance and recording his first success over two and a half miles at Worcester Racecourse. He went on to win chases at Sandown Park Racecourse and Newbury but fell heavily at Ascot Racecourse on his final appearance of the season.

In the 1984/5 National Hunt season, Charter Party was matched against more experienced chasers. After being placed at Sandown, he fell at Ascot before winning a minor event at Worcester. The gelding went on to win a chase at Newbury, but on his first appearance at the Cheltenham Festival he fell in the Kim Muir Chase. Later that spring he won again at Newbury and finished second to Aces Wild at Cheltenham in April. On his first appearance of the next season Charter Party fell in the Hennessy Gold Cup, before winning at Kempton Park on Boxing Day, but then ran poorly at Windsor in January. In March 1986 Charter Party made his second appearance at the Cheltenham Festival and carried 150 pounds in the National Hunt Handicap Chase. Ridden as in most of his previous races by Peter Scudamore, he won from a field which included the previous year's winner West Tip. On his final appearance of the season he carried top weight to victory in the Golden Miller Chase at Cheltenham in April.

Richard Dunwoody took over as Charter Party's regular jockey in the 1986/7 National Hunt season. The campaign was not a successful one, as the gelding failed to win in six races. He finished fourth on his debut at Wincanton, was pulled up in the Hennessy Gold Cup and ran third in under top-weight in the Mandarin Chase. He fell in the Gainsborough Chase at Sandown (won by Desert Orchid) and was beaten when attempting to concede twenty-eight pounds to the future Grand National winner Mr Frisk at Nottingham. On 19 March he made his first attempt to win the Cheltenham Gold Cup. A fall of snow delayed the start and created very challenging conditions. Charter Party fell at the fifth in a race won by The Thinker.

=== 1987/1988 National Hunt season ===
On his first appearance of the 1987/1988 National Hunt season, Charter Party was beaten on heavy ground at Lingfield Park but improved to finish a handicap chase at Kempton on Boxing Day under a weight of 168 pounds. In February the gelding carried 151 pounds in the Gainsborough Chase, and established himself as a serious contender for the Cheltenham Gold Cup, winning by eight lengths from the Welsh National winner Rhyme 'n' Reason, with Desert Orchid third ahead of Run and Skip.

On 15 March Charter Party, ridden by Dunwoody, started at odds of 10/1 for the 61st running of the Cheltenham Gold Cup. With Desert Orchid switched to contest the Queen Mother Champion Chase, the favourite for the race was Play School, a New Zealand-bred gelding who had won the Welsh National and the Vincent O'Brien Gold Cup since relocating to Britain. The other contenders included Rhyme 'n' Reason, Run and Skip, Forgive 'n' Forget (winner of the race in 1985), Cybrandian (runner-up in 1987), the French Challenger Nupsala (King George VI Chase), Kildimo (RSA Chase) and the diminutive but improving Cavvies Clown. Dunwoody settled Charter Party just behind the leaders as Beau Ranger set the early pace from Cybrandian. By the end of the first circuit Golden Friend had moved to the front from Cavvies Clown and Run and Skip with Charter Party well placed in fifth. Cavvies Clown took the lead early on the second circuit and took the fourth last in front from Charter Party, whilst Forgive 'n' Forget who appeared to be travelling best of all in third sustained a serious leg injury and was immediately pulled up. With most of the other runners beginning to struggle, the Gold Cup became two-horse race, with Cavvies Clown turning into the straight a length in front of Charter Party. When Cavvies Clown jumped poorly at the penultimate fence and began to hang to the right, Dunwoody sent Charter Party into the lead on the inside. Charter Party jumped the last fence in front and maintained his advantage on the run-in to win by six lengths, with Beau Ranger another ten lengths back in third place.

=== Later career ===
Charter Party remained in training for two more seasons but failed to win again, and became increasingly subject to his leg problems. In December 1988 he finished last when carrying top weight of 168 pounds in the Rehearsal Chase at Chepstow and then came home last of the five runners behind Desert Orchid in the King George VI Chase at Kempton. In February he finished last of four behind Desert Orchid in the Gainborough Chase and then fell in the Vincent O'Brien Gold Cup, which was won by Carvill's Hill. On 16 March, Charter Party started a 14/1 outsider as he attempted to repeat his 1988 success in the Cheltenham Gold Cup. Desert Orchid started favourite, whilst the other runners included Carvill's Hill, Cavvies Clown, The Thinker, West Tip and Ten Plus. In a race run on heavy ground Charter Party was one of the few runners to cope with the conditions and raced prominently throughout before finishing third behind Desert Orchid and Yahoo. The gelding fell at the twelfth fence in the Martell Cup at Aintree Racecourse and unseated Dunwoody at the final fence when favourite for the Golden Miller Chase at Cheltenham in April. In the Whitbread Gold Cup at Sandown on 29 April, Charter Party carried a weight of 160 pounds and finished third behind Brown Windsor and Sam da Vinci, both of whom were carrying 140 pounds.

On 22 November 1989, Charter Party started at odds of 8/1 for the Edward Hanmer Chase over three miles at Haydock Park on what was to be his final racecourse appearance. He led until the second last before finishing third behind Golden Friend and The Thinker.

== Retirement ==
Charter Party was retired from racing after his defeat at Haydock in 1989 and spent the rest of his life at the Moulds' farm at Guiting Power. He was euthanised in June 2000 at the age of twenty-two after becoming incapacitated by arthritis. David Nicholson said "I consider winning a Gold Cup with Charter Party was my best training performance. He was a very talented and very brave horse, but also a very unsound one. Unfortunately he didn't get the recognition he deserved".

== Pedigree ==
Pedigree of Charter Party (IRE), bay gelding, 1978
Sire Document (GB) 1967	Narrator (GB); 1951	Nearco	Pharos
Sire Document (GB) 1967	Narrator (GB); 1951	Nearco	Nogara
Sire Document (GB) 1967	Narrator (GB); 1951	Phase	Windsor Lad
Sire Document (GB) 1967	Narrator (GB); 1951	Phase	Lost Soul
Sire Document (GB) 1967	Above Board (GB); 1947	Straight Deal	Solario
Sire Document (GB) 1967	Above Board (GB); 1947	Straight Deal	Good Deal
Sire Document (GB) 1967	Above Board (GB); 1947	Feola	Friar Marcus
Sire Document (GB) 1967	Above Board (GB); 1947	Feola	Aloe
Dam Ahoy There (GB) 1964	Little Buskins (GB); 1957	Solar Slipper	Windsor Slipper
Dam Ahoy There (GB) 1964	Little Buskins (GB); 1957	Solar Slipper	Solar Flower
Dam Ahoy There (GB) 1964	Little Buskins (GB); 1957	Overboard	Xandover
Dam Ahoy There (GB) 1964	Little Buskins (GB); 1957	Overboard	Sea Pie
Dam Ahoy There (GB) 1964	Solvada (GB); 1947	Solferino	Fairway
Dam Ahoy There (GB) 1964	Solvada (GB); 1947	Solferino	Sol Speranza
Dam Ahoy There (GB) 1964	Solvada (GB); 1947	Ovada	Solario
Dam Ahoy There (GB) 1964	Solvada (GB); 1947	Ovada	Silk Meadow (Family 22-d)
