= Ben Pauling =

British racehorse trainer

Ben Pauling (born October 1983) is a British National Hunt trainer. He has won multiple Grade 1 races, including the 2025 King George VI Chase.

== Background ==
Pauling grew up on his parents' arable farm in Gloucestershire, where his father trained horses for point-to-points. He went to Bloxham School and, in 2002, won the Young Engineer of Britain competition with a device for binding hay bales. He then graduated in land management from the University of Reading. Having ridden in point-to-points until an accident with barbed wire led to the loss of sight in his right eye and the loss of his licence, he decided to go into training and worked as assistant trainer to Nicky Henderson for several years.

== Career as a trainer ==
In 2013, Pauling took out a licence as a trainer and leased a yard at Bourton-on-the-Water, starting out with just eight horses. His first winner was Raven's Tower, a £2,000 purchase. Barters Hill provided him with his first Grade 1 win, when ridden by David Bass in the Challow Novices' Hurdle at Newbury in December 2015. His first winner at the Cheltenham Festival was Willoughby Court in the 2017 Baring Bingham Novices' Hurdle.

In 2020, Pauling and his wife bought the Naunton Downs Golf Club and set about building state-of-the-art training facilities on the 200 acre estate. The horses were moved to the new yard in April 2022. In his early years as a trainer, Pauling regularly used jockeys David Bass, Nico de Boinville, and Daryl Jacob, but they all had retainers elsewhere and he appointed Kielan Woods as stable jockey in 2021. Woods was replaced by Ben Jones at the beginning of the 2024/25 season. Jones rode The Jukebox Man, owned by football manager Harry Redknapp, to victory in the King George VI Chase at Kempton in December 2025, securing Pauling his most valuable win to date.

== Personal life ==
Pauling married Sophie Finch, daughter of trainer and owner Tim Finch, in 2013. The couple have two children. Pauling's sister is married to trainer Charlie Longsdon.

== Major wins ==
(United Kingdom) Great Britain

- Baring Bingham Novices' Hurdle - (1) Willoughby Court (2017)
- Challow Novices' Hurdle - (1) Barters Hill (2015)
- Kauto Star Novices' Chase - (1) The Jukebox Man (2024)
- King George VI Chase - (1) The Jukebox Man (2025)
- Scilly Isles Novices' Chase - (1) Handstands (2025)
