= Mill House (horse) =

Irish-bred Thoroughbred racehorse (1957–1975)

- Racing silks of William Gollings
- Sire: King Hal
- Grandsire: Windsor Lad
- Dam: Nas Na Riogh
- Damsire: Cariff
- Sex: Gelding
- Foaled: 1957
- Country: Ireland
- Colour: Bay
- Breeder: Mrs Bridget Lawlor at Punchestown, Co. Kildare
- Owner: William H. Gollings
- Trainer: Fulke Walwyn
- Record: 34: 16-6-2

Major wins
- Cheltenham Gold Cup (1963); Hennessy Gold Cup (1963); King George VI Chase (1963); Gainsborough Chase (1964, 1965, 1967); Whitbread Gold Cup (1967)

Awards
- Timeform rating: 191
- Last updated on September 30, 2006

Mill House (1957– October 1975) was an Irish-bred, English-trained racehorse. He is considered one of the best National Hunt racing horses in British horse racing history and known for a great rivalry with Irish star Arkle. Mill House won the 1963 Cheltenham Gold Cup and 1967 Whitbread Gold Cup. A handsome horse with a shining white star on his forehead, Mill House was known for his good jumping.

Known as 'The Big Horse' on account of his height of 18 hands, Mill House took part in one of the most famous battles of National Hunt Racing when, now trained by Fulke Walwyn and ridden by Willie Robinson, he defended his Cheltenham crown against Arkle and two other horses in March 1964. Mill House had won the Hennessy Gold Cup the previous autumn, beating Arkle into third. Mill House set off as 8/13 favourite, led much of the way and pushed Arkle close before losing by five lengths, with the third and fourth a long way back. In 2022, Commentator Brough Scott nominated this race for the Racing Post's 'Greatest Race Ever' series.

The following year, Mill House took Arkle on again in the Gold Cup but lost. His size meant increasing back problems, and he failed to participate in 1966 when Arkle won his third crown. In 1967, Mill House was back but Arkle was not, having been retired after suffering a serious leg injury a few months before at Kempton. However, Mill House slipped and fell at an open ditch in the back straight, and the race was won by a virtual unknown, Woodland Venture.

A few weeks later, Mill House won the prestigious Whitbread Gold Cup under top weight at Sandown Park. It was his last major win. Continuing back weakness plagued his campaign in 1968 when he fell again in both the Cheltenham and Whitbread Gold Cups. He died in October 1975.

With a Timeform rating of 191, Mill House remains one of the highest-rated National Hunt horses ever.
