= Bet Twice =

American-bred Thoroughbred racehorse

- Sire: Sportin' Life
- Grandsire: Nijinsky
- Dam: Golden Dust
- Damsire: Dusty Canyon
- Sex: Stallion
- Foaled: 1984
- Country: United States
- Colour: Chestnut
- Breeder: William S. Farish III & E. J. Hudson
- Owner: Cisely Stable & Robert Levy
- Trainer: Warren A. Croll, Jr.
- Record: 26: 10-6-4
- Earnings: $3,308,599

Major wins
- Pimlico Special Handicap (1988); Haskell Invitational Handicap (1987); Fountain of Youth Stakes (1987); Laurel Futurity (1986); Sapling Stakes (1986); Arlington-Washington Futurity Stakes (1986) Triple Crown race wins: Belmont Stakes (1987)
- Last updated on August 17, 2007

Bet Twice (April 20, 1984 – March 5, 1999) was a multi-millionaire American thoroughbred racehorse and sire. Foaled in Kentucky, he was out of the mare Golden Dust and was sired by Sportin' Life, who in turn was the son of the British Triple Crown champion Nijinsky. He was bred by William S. Farish III and E. J. Hudson and born on what became Lane's End Farm in Versailles, Kentucky.

== Two-year-old season ==
Bet Twice was owned by a syndicate of approximately three dozen that included baseball players Pete Rose and Garry Maddox. His principal shareholder was Robert Levy, the owner of Atlantic City Race Course. As a two-year-old, Bet Twice won the grade one Laurel Futurity and Arlington-Washington Futurity Stakes and the grade two Sapling Stakes.

== Three-year-old season ==
Early in his three-year-old season, Bet Twice won the grade two Fountain of Youth Stakes on the road to the Triple Crown. He met a crop of talented horses in that three-year-old year, including Gulch and Cryptoclearance; however, his rivalry with Kentucky Derby and Preakness Stakes winner Alysheba was most famous. He faced the other colt nine times, beating him three times (Alysheba won four times, while neither horse won in their other two meetings).

Bet Twice and Alysheba battled down the stretch in what many consider one of the most physical Derbies ever. Alysheba prevailed by a half length over Bet Twice with both colts almost two and a half length in front of the rest of the field.

In the Preakness Stakes, Bet Twice was listed at post time as the fourth choice at 5–1. He broke sharply and was third going into the first turn. He was up with the leaders when he was floated out wide. Approaching the stretch, the colt took the lead from Lookingforthebigone and Alysheba. In the closing moments of the race, Alysheba rallied, and Bet Twice lost by a half length again. In third and fourth were Cryptoclearance and Gulch respectively.

Bet Twice may be best known for his victory in the 1987 Belmont Stakes. Ridden by Craig Perret and trained by Jimmy Croll, he won by 14 lengths, which was the fifth-largest margin in the history of the race, and denied Alysheba the Triple Crown. By virtue of his victory in the Belmont and runner-up performances in the Preakness Stakes and the Kentucky Derby, he edged out Alysheba for the first ever $1,000,000 Chrysler Triple Crown Bonus as the top performing three-year-old in the Triple Crown series. Bet Twice became the fourth horse to win one Triple Crown race and finish second in the other two, joining Alsab (1942), Sword Dancer (1959), and Arts and Letters (1969), then followed later by Easy Goer (1989) and Journalism (2025).

Bet Twice then won the Haskell Invitational at Monmouth Park over Alysheba. He also finished ahead of Alysheba in the Travers Stakes at Saratoga Race Course, though both horses finished in mid-pack behind Java Gold on the sloppy track.

== Four-year-old season ==
When Bet Twice was four, his connections accepted an invitation to run him in the first revival of the $500,000 Grade I Pimlico Special Handicap at "Old Hilltop" in Baltimore, Maryland. He entered that race as the post-time fourth choice at odds of 7–1 in a field of seven graded stakes winners, including Crytoclearance. Going into the famous "club house turn" at Pimlico Race Course, Oaklawn Handicap winner Lost Code led the field, followed by local favorite Little Bold John and dual classic winner Alysheba. Then, on the far turn, Bet Twice weaved through traffic and moved between horses to challenge for the lead. Coming down the stretch, he drifted out and brushed Lost Code. Then he drew off and won by 3/4 lengths. The time for the Grade I race at 1 3/16 miles was 1:54 1/5.

Later that year, Bet Twice had runner-up finishes in the Grade I Philip H. Iselin Handicap, the Grade III Ben Ali Stakes and the Grade III Salvator Mile. He also had show performances in the Grade I Suburban Handicap and the Grade I United Nations Handicap.

== Retirement ==
Bet Twice stood at stud for six years at Muirfield Farm from 1990 through 1996. He was pensioned from stud duty at age 12. On March 5, 1999, he died at Muirfield East in Maryland at age 15.
