= Alysheba =

American-bred Thoroughbred racehorse

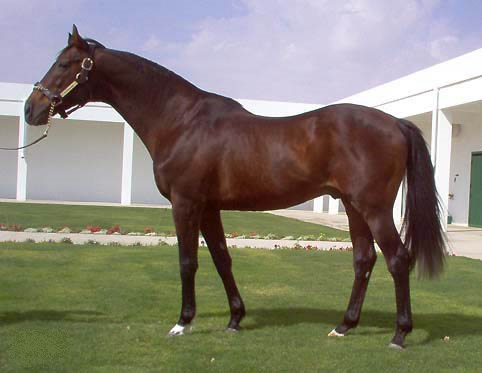
- Alysheba at King Abdullah's farm in Saudi Arabia
- Sire: Alydar
- Grandsire: Raise a Native
- Dam: Bel Sheba
- Damsire: Lt. Stevens
- Sex: Stallion
- Foaled: March 3, 1984
- Died: March 27, 2009 (aged 25)
- Country: United States
- Colour: Bay
- Breeder: Preston W. Madden
- Owner: Dorothy & Pamela Scharbauer
- Trainer: Jack Van Berg
- Record: 26: 11-8-2
- Earnings: $6,679,242

Major wins
- Super Derby (1987); Strub Stakes (1988); San Bernardino Handicap (1988); Santa Anita Handicap (1988); Philip H. Iselin Handicap (1988); Meadowlands Cup (1988); Woodward Stakes (1988); Breeders' Cup Classic (1988); American Classic Race wins: Kentucky Derby (1987); Preakness Stakes (1987)

Awards
- U.S. Champion Three-Year-Old Colt (1987); U.S. Champion Older Male Horse (1988); United States Horse of the Year (1988)

Honours
- United States Racing Hall of Fame (1993) #42 - Top 100 U.S. Racehorses of the 20th Century; Alysheba Court in Napa, California; Alysheba Drive in Bakersfield, California Alysheba Way in Lexington, Kentucky; GII Alysheba Stakes at Churchill Downs; Alysheba Ln in Midland, Texas
- Last updated on 4 August 2022

Alysheba (March 3, 1984 – March 27, 2009) was an American Thoroughbred racehorse that won two legs of the Triple Crown in 1987. A successful sire, he produced 11 stakes winners.

A bay colt, Alysheba was sired by Alydar out of the mare Bel Sheba, by Lt. Stevens. He was bred by Preston Madden at Hamburg Place Farm in Lexington, Kentucky, and was sold as a yearling to Dorothy and Pam Scharbauer for $500,000.

Trained by Jack Van Berg, Alysheba had a modest two-year-old season in 1986, and won only a maiden race. He finished third in the Breeders' Cup Juvenile, and lost the Hollywood Futurity in a photo finish. As a three-year-old, he underperformed in his preparatory races for the Kentucky Derby until it was discovered that he had an entrapped epiglottis. Surgery was successful, and he was entered in the Derby despite having only a maiden victory.

== Triple Crown races ==
In the Derby, he and jockey Chris McCarron were nearly knocked to the ground at the top of the stretch by Bet Twice. Alysheba recovered from the collision and won the Derby in a slow time of 2:03 4/5 for 1 1/4 miles. He then came back with another win in the Preakness Stakes, then attempted to become American racing's 12th Triple Crown winner in the Belmont Stakes.

In the Belmont, Alysheba raced without the medication Lasix, which was prohibited at the time in New York racing. He finished fourth as Bet Twice won by 14 lengths. Alysheba next went to Monmouth Park for the Haskell Invitational, where he met Bet Twice, as well as Lost Code, a top-class speed horse that had won several derbies run at minor racetracks. The three horses finished together at the wire, with Bet Twice winning in a driving finish. Later in the year, Alysheba lost to Java Gold on an off track in the Travers Stakes at Saratoga Race Course; he then won the Super Derby at Louisiana Downs, his final preparation race for the Breeders' Cup Classic (the world's richest horse race at the time).

== 1987 Breeders' Cup ==
In the Breeders' Cup Classic, Alysheba met 1986 Kentucky Derby-winner Ferdinand in the first meeting of Kentucky Derby winners since Affirmed faced Spectacular Bid in the 1979 Jockey Club Gold Cup. Ferdinand (ridden by 56-year-old Willie Shoemaker) beat Alysheba in a photo finish by a nose. Alysheba lost the Horse of the Year vote to Ferdinand, but was named Champion Three-Year-Old of 1987.

== Four-year-old season ==
As a four-year-old in 1988, Alysheba won six Grade I stakes. At Santa Anita, he won the Strub Stakes over Candi's Gold. Then he beat Ferdinand in the Santa Anita Handicap and (in another photo finish) the San Bernardino Handicap, with each horse carrying 127 pounds.

Alysheba lost to his old foes Bet Twice and Lost Code in the Pimlico Special, which had been revived for the first time in three decades. He also finished behind Cutlass Reality, who upset both Alysheba and Ferdinand in the Derby winners' final meeting in the Hollywood Gold Cup. Alysheba then defeated Bet Twice in the Philip K. Iselin Handicap at Monmouth Park Racetrack. Alysheba and Bet Twice met 9 times. Alysheba defeated Bet Twice in four of those races, Bet Twice won three times, and neither horse won two of the races.

In the 35th running of the Woodward Stakes at Belmont Park, Alysheba beat an outstanding field, including 1988 Travers 1-2 finishers Forty Niner and Seeking the Gold, eventual Jockey Club Gold Cup-winner Waquoit, and Florida Derby-winner Brian's Time. He ran the 1 1/4 miles in 1:59 2/5, setting a track record. He also set the track record for 1 1/4 miles at the Meadowlands Racetrack in the Meadowlands Cup. Alysheba became the only horse in the modern era to run 10 furlongs under 2:00 three times in one calendar year.

== 1988 Breeders' Cup ==
Alysheba closed out his career at Churchill Downs, winning the 1988 Breeders' Cup Classic over Seeking the Gold, Waquoit (one of the most noted off-track runners of the time), Forty Niner, and Cutlass Reality. With the victory, he secured Horse of the Year and Champion Older Horse honors. He also became the first horse to win three legs of a four-race sequence that was defined in 2015 as the Grand Slam of Thoroughbred racing: The Triple Crown races, plus the Breeders' Cup Classic, though not in the same year. As the Breeders' Cup began after the 1978 Triple Crown win of Affirmed, the potential for a sweep of all four races only became possible in 1984 and was only accomplished in 2015 after American Pharoah won the Triple Crown.

Alysheba was ridden in 17 consecutive starts by Hall of Fame jockey Chris McCarron. He finished his career with a record of 11-8-2 in 26 starts. His earnings totaled $6,679,242, a record at the time.

== Breeding career and return home ==
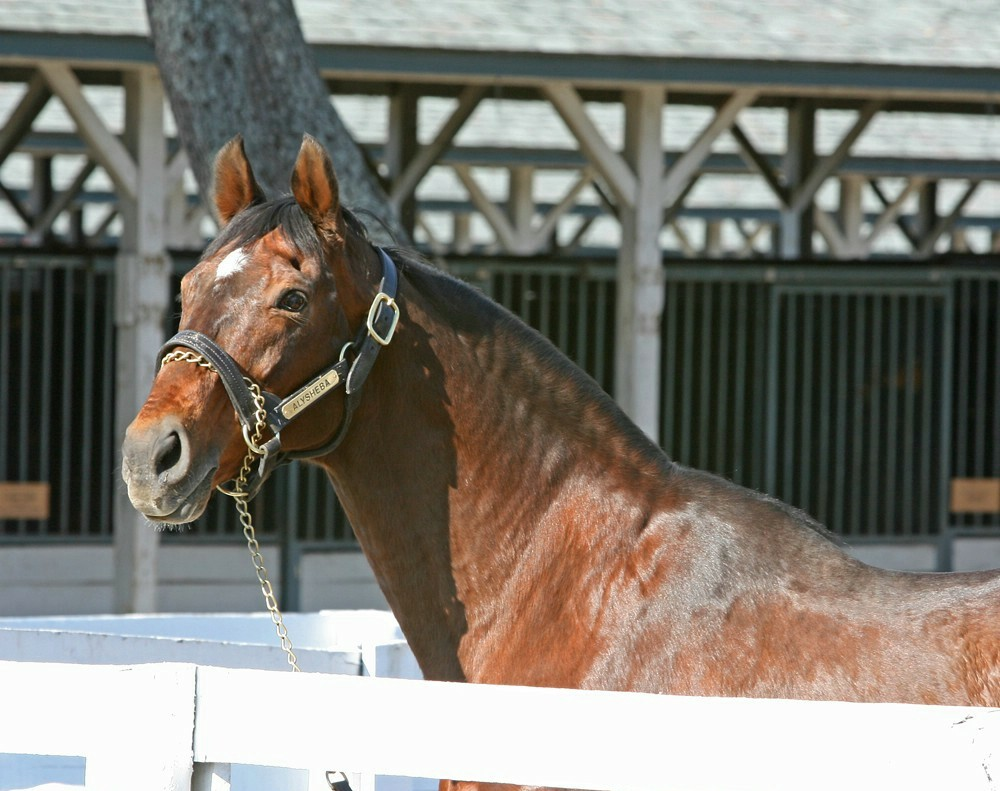
Alysheba in 2008 at Kentucky Horse Park

Alysheba stood at Lane's End Farm in Woodford County, Kentucky until 1999, when he was sold to a breeding operation in Saudi Arabia. He sired 11 stakes winners, of which his best was 1994 Canadian Horse of the Year Alywow. Another offspring of note was multiple stakes-winner Desert Waves. Upon the death of Genuine Risk in August 2008, Alysheba became the oldest living Kentucky Derby winner. In October 2008, King Abdullah of Saudi Arabia returned Alysheba to his homeland as a gift to the American people. After spending eight years in the king's royal stables, Alysheba returned to the United States to live at the Kentucky Horse Park. He lived in the stall formerly occupied by Horse of the Year John Henry and across the aisle from Cigar, the leading money-earning Thoroughbred until surpassed by Curlin in 2008.

Aysheba's gravesite at Kentucky Horse Park

On Friday, March 27, 2009, at 11:13 pm, Alysheba was euthanized at the Hagyard Equine Medical Institute. "Due to a chronic degenerative spinal condition that led to ataxia and instability, Alysheba fell in his stall yesterday, injuring his right hind femur," said Kathy Hopkins, the Horse Park's director of equine operations. "Complicated by his advanced age, this trauma resulted in severe pain that did not respond to analgesic therapy. The resulting pain and suffering, and the inability to stand unaided, led to a joint decision for euthanasia." Alysheba was buried on March 28 at the Kentucky Horse Park's Hall of Champions, across from the grave of John Henry.

== Honors ==
Besides his three Eclipse Awards for 1988 Horse of the Year, 1988 Champion Older Male, and 1987 Champion Three-Year-Old Male, Alysheba won other honors. A statue of him was erected at the front entrance to the AEGON Center in downtown Louisville, Kentucky. He was inducted into the National Museum of Racing and Hall of Fame in 1993. In the Blood-Horse magazine ranking of the top 100 U.S. thoroughbred champions of the 20th Century, Alysheba was ranked number 42.

== Pedigree ==
Pedigree of Alysheba, bay stallion, foaled March 3, 1984
| Sire Alydar ch. 1975 | Raise A Native ch. 1961 | Native Dancer gr. 1950 | Polynesian |
| Sire Alydar ch. 1975 | Raise A Native ch. 1961 | Native Dancer gr. 1950 | Geisha |
| Sire Alydar ch. 1975 | Raise A Native ch. 1961 | Raise You ch. 1946 | Case Ace |
| Sire Alydar ch. 1975 | Raise A Native ch. 1961 | Raise You ch. 1946 | Lady Glory |
| Sire Alydar ch. 1975 | Sweet Tooth b. 1965 | On-and-On b. 1956 | Nasrullah |
| Sire Alydar ch. 1975 | Sweet Tooth b. 1965 | On-and-On b. 1956 | Two Lea |
| Sire Alydar ch. 1975 | Sweet Tooth b. 1965 | Plum Cake ch. 1958 | Ponder |
| Sire Alydar ch. 1975 | Sweet Tooth b. 1965 | Plum Cake ch. 1958 | Real Delight |
| Dam Bel Sheba b. 1970 | Lt. Stevens b. 1961 | Nantallah b. 1953 | Nasrullah |
| Dam Bel Sheba b. 1970 | Lt. Stevens b. 1961 | Nantallah b. 1953 | Shimmer |
| Dam Bel Sheba b. 1970 | Lt. Stevens b. 1961 | Rough Shod II b. 1944 | Gold Bridge |
| Dam Bel Sheba b. 1970 | Lt. Stevens b. 1961 | Rough Shod II b. 1944 | Dalmary |
| Dam Bel Sheba b. 1970 | Belthazar br. 1960 | War Admiral br. 1934 | Man O' War |
| Dam Bel Sheba b. 1970 | Belthazar br. 1960 | War Admiral br. 1934 | Brushup |
| Dam Bel Sheba b. 1970 | Belthazar br. 1960 | Blinking Owl br. 1938 | Pharamond |
| Dam Bel Sheba b. 1970 | Belthazar br. 1960 | Blinking Owl br. 1938 | Baba Kenny (Family 20) |

Alysheba is inbred 4x4 to Nasrullah, meaning that Nasrullah appears twice in the fourth generation of Alysheba's pedigree.

== See also ==
- Alydar
- Bet Twice
- Kentucky Horse Park
