= 2002 Grand National =

English steeplechase horse race

- Grand National
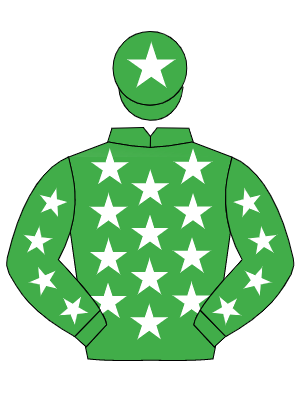
- Location: Aintree Racecourse
- Date: 6 April 2002
- Winning horse: (Republic of Ireland) Bindaree
- Starting price: 20/1
- Jockey: (Republic of Ireland) Jim Culloty
- Trainer: (United Kingdom) Nigel Twiston-Davies
- Owner: (England) Raymond Mould
- Conditions: Good

External videos
- Replay of the 2002 Grand National in full Racing TV, YouTube

The 2002 Grand National (officially known as the Martell Grand National for sponsorship reasons) was the 155th official renewal of the Grand National steeplechase that took place at Aintree Racecourse near Liverpool, England, on 6 April 2002.

The race was won by eight-year-old 20/1 shot Bindaree, ridden by Jim Culloty and trained by Nigel Twiston-Davies at Grange Hill Farm in Naunton, Gloucestershire, by a distance of 1¾ lengths from What's Up Boys (10/1) in a time of 10 minutes 3 seconds. The winner was bred by Noel King in County Down, Northern Ireland, and was owned by Raymond Mould.

The field was limited to a maximum of 40 runners, with 11 completing the course. Nine horses fell at the first fence. There were two equine fatalities during the second circuit of the race: Manx Magic at the 20th fence and The Last Fling at the second Canal Turn.

During the live television broadcast of the race on BBC One, watched by 8.6 million people, rival network station ITV1 suffered its lowest ever viewing figures with 300,000 people (a 3% market share) watching an ice hockey match at the same time. BBC Two broadcast a Six Nations rugby international, which retained 900,000 viewers at race time, while 800,000 viewers watched a film on Channel 4.

== Racecard ==
No	Colours	Horse	Age	Handicap (st-lb)	SP	Jockey	Trainer
1		Marborough (IRE)	10	11-12	20/1	Mick Fitzgerald	Nicky Henderson
2		Alexander Banquet (IRE)	9	11-11	22/1	Barry Geraghty	Willie Mullins
3		Kingsmark (IRE)	9	11-09	16/1	Ruby Walsh	Martin Todhunter
4		What's Up Boys (IRE)	8	11-06	10/1	Richard Johnson	Philip Hobbs
5		Lyreen Wonder	9	11-04	40/1	Barry Cash	Arthur Moore
6		Ad Hoc (IRE)	8	11-01	10/1	Paul Carberry	Paul Nicholls
7		Beau (IRE)	9	11-01	11/1	Carl Llewellyn	Nigel Twiston-Davies
8		David's Lad (IRE)	8	11-01	10/1	Timmy Murphy	Tony Martin
9		Paris Pike (IRE)	10	10-13	10/1	Richard Guest	Ferdy Murphy
10		Majed (FR)	6	10-11	66/1	Barry Fenton	Martin Pipe
11		Inn At The Top	10	10-08	40/1	Adie Smith	James Turner
12		Streamstown (IRE)	8	10-08	40/1	John McNamara	Ferdy Murphy
13		You're Agoodun	10	10-08	50/1	Johnny Kavanagh	Martin Pipe
14		Royal Predica (FR)	8	10-08	80/1	Jimmy McCarthy	Martin Pipe
15		Manx Magic (USA)	9	10-07	100/1	Gerry Supple	Martin Pipe
16		Blowing Wind (FR)	9	10-06	8/1 F	Tony McCoy	Martin Pipe
17		The Last Fling (IRE)	12	10-06	40/1	Richie McGrath	Sue Smith
18		Wicked Crack (IRE)	9	10-05	33/1	Conor O'Dwyer	Edward Hales
19		Frantic Tan (IRE)	10	10-05	50/1	Tom Jenks	Nigel Twiston-Davies
20		Super Franky (IRE)	9	10-05	66/1	Philip O'Brien	Charles Byrnes
21		Bindaree (IRE)	8	10-04	20/1	Jim Culloty	Nigel Twiston-Davies
22		Celibate (IRE)	11	10-03	66/1	Noel Fehily	Charlie Mann
23		Struggles Glory (IRE)	11	10-03	66/1	Benjamin Hitchcott	David Robinson
24		Mely Moss (FR)	11	10-02	25/1	Norman Williamson	Charles Egerton
25		Gun'n Roses II (FR)	8	10-02	100/1	Marcus Foley	Martin Pipe
26		Smarty (IRE)	9	10-01	16/1	Tom Scudamore	Mark Pitman
27		Murt's Man (IRE)	8	10-01	66/1	Andrew Thornton	Paul Nicholls
28		Niki Dee (IRE)	12	10-01	66/1	Russ Garritty	Peter Beaumont
29		Goguenard (FR)	8	10-00	66/1	Warren Marston	Nicky Henderson
30		Logician (NZ)	10	10-00	80/1	Mark Bradburne	Andrew Balding
31		Samuel Wilderspin	10	10-00	14/1	Tom Doyle	Richard Lee
32		Ackzo	9	10-00	25/1	Dean Gallagher	Ferdy Murphy
33		Red Ark	9	10-00	50/1	Kenny Johnson	Norman Mason
34		Birkdale (IRE)	11	10-00	50/1	Jason Maguire	Ferdy Murphy
35		Spot Thedifference (IRE)	9	10-00	33/1	David Casey	Enda Bolger
36		Djeddah (FR)	11	10-00	66/1	Thierry Doumen	Francois Doumen
37		Inis Cara (IRE)	10	10-00	66/1	Brian Crowley	Venetia Williams
38		Iris Bleu (FR)	6	10-00	100/1	Paul Moloney	Martin Pipe
39		Carryonharry (IRE)	8	10-00	66/1	Rupert Wakley	Martin Pipe
40		Supreme Charm (IRE)	10	10-00	28/1	Robert Thornton	Kim Bailey

- Great Britain unless stated.

== Leading contenders ==
The long-time ante-post favourite was Moor Lane but his price began to drift as possibility grew that the horse was so far down the handicap that it would not make the cut of forty runners. The other long-time ante-post favourite was Welsh Grand National winner Supreme Glory but the horse was withdrawn a few weeks before the race.

Blowing Wind was sent off as the 8/1 favourite with champion jockey Tony McCoy in the saddle. The pair had been considered unfortunate in finishing a remounted third after being brought down in the previous year's National. The favourite gave his backers a good run for their money and shared the lead with Bindaree until three fences from the finish when he was outpaced to come home in third place.

Ad Hoc was noticed as a good Spring horse when winning the Whitbread Gold Cup the previous April and was ridden by 1999 winning jockey Paul Carberry. Despite several jumping errors, the 10/1 joint-second favourite was lying a close fifth when brought down three fences from home by the falling David's Lad leaving many to regard him as the hard luck story of the race.

David's Lad was a former winner of the Irish Grand National and was well supported to joint-second favourite on the back of the recent successes of Irish National winners and was ridden by Timmy Murphy. The pair moved into the leading contingent early on the second circuit and was still going well in fourth place when falling at the third-last fence.

Paris Pike was the winner of the 2001 Scottish Grand National just a week after that year's Grand National, and was partnered with the winning rider in the prior year's National, Richard Guest. His backers had little to cheer when the 10/1 partnership was severed at the first fence.

What's Up Boys came to prominence when winning the testing Hennessy Cognac Gold Cup but was also quickly picked up as the "housewives' choice" when the once-a-year betting public discovered he was a grey and was bidding to be the first grey to win for over forty years. With Richard Johnson in the saddle the pair went off as joint-second favourites at 10/1 and looked to have the race won when taking the lead from Bindaree over the last fence and going three lengths clear at the elbow before (most unusually in a Grand National) being re-overtaken by Bindaree in the final hundred yards to finish second.

== The Race ==
Placed horses

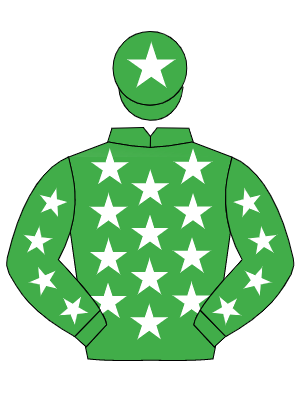
1: Bindaree

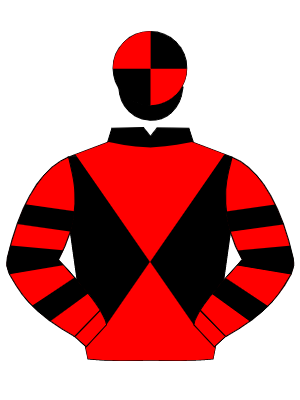
2: What's Up Boys

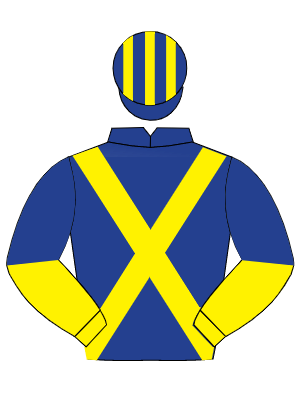
3: Blowing Wind

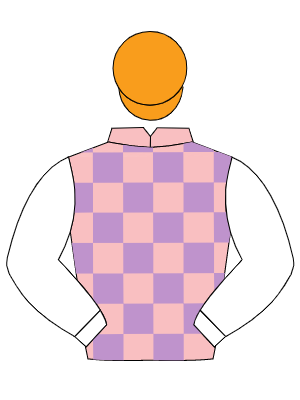
4: Kingsmark

Wicked Crack led the field over Melling Road towards the first fence where nine horses fell. The leader was the first to fall along with Carryonharry who brought down Logician. Marlborough, Inn At The Top and Goguenard also fell. Red Ark unseated its rider and Struggles Glory was brought down by the fall of 10/1 shot Paris Pike. The Last Fling and Supreme Charm led the field over the fences before Beecher's Brook. There was no fallers at the next two fences. At the 4th fence, both Niki Dee and Samuel Wilderspin fell at the rear of the field. At the next fence, Frantic Tan unseated its rider towards the rear along with Iris Bleu who fell. At Beecher's Brook Alexander Banquet made a mistake and unseated its rider Barry Geraghty. The next fence which was the 7th (Foinavon) Gun'n Roses II hit the fence and fell. All horses jumped the Canal Turn safely, at the next fence which was Valentine's Brook the year before runner-up Smarty was pulled up when tailed off after being badly hampered at the first fence. The Last Fling and Supreme Charm continued to lead the field up until the fence before The Chair (14th) where Beau and Celibate joined them. However, Beau blundered and unseated its rider at the fence, there were no fallers at The Chair or Water Jump. Twenty-three horses continued onto the second circuit of the race. Before the 17th fence, Murt's Man was tailed off and pulled up. At the next fence Super Franky fell when behind. The 19th which was an open ditch was jumped safely by all of the horses still running. The next fence saw Lyreen Wonder unseat its rider when chasing the leaders and Manx Magic fell towards the rear. Ackzo was pulled up at the same fence after tailing off. At Beecher's Brook second time round Majed fell in mid division. Bindaree was the new leader in the tight compact field as they ran towards the Canal Turn. At the Canal Turn, The Last Fling fell when weakening and Inis Cara was pulled up when well behind the rest of the runners. All of the horses managed to jump Valentine's Brook and the 26th fence. Although at the next fence which was another Open Ditch, David's Lad was prominent when falling and brought down Ad Hoc, Djeddah unseated its rider after being hampered by the fall of a loose horse. Spot Thedifference also unseated its rider after being badly hampered. As they crossed over the Melling Road towards the final two fences Bindaree led What's Up Boys who was followed by Blowing Wind and Kingsmark, the group of four had pulled a couple of lengths clear of Royal Predica and Supreme Charm. Bindaree and What's Up Boys jumped the last two fences together well clear of Blowing Wind in third. What's Up Boys gained the advantage on the run in by 3 lengths and past the elbow, 75 yards from the finish Bindaree took the lead and stayed on well to win the race ahead of What's Up Boys in second. Blowing Wind was third 27 lengths behind What's Up Boys. Kingsmark finished fourth, Supreme Charm and Celibate ran good races to finish 5th and 6th respectively. Behind these was You're Agoodun, Royal Predica, Streamstown, Birkdale and Mely Moss who was last to complete after falling at the second last fence (29th) and remounting. Eleven horses completed the race.

== Finishing order ==
Position	Number	Horse	Jockey	Age	Handicap	SP	Distance
1st	21	Bindaree	Jim Culloty	8	10-4	20/1	Won by 1¾ lengths
2nd	4	What's Up Boys	Richard Johnson	8	11-6	10/1	27 lengths
3rd	16	Blowing Wind	Tony McCoy	9	10-6	8/1 F	9 lengths
4th	3	Kingsmark	Ruby Walsh	9	11-9	16/1	17 lengths
5th	40	Supreme Charm	Robert Thornton	10	10-0	28/1	3½ lengths
6th	22	Celibate	Noel Fehily	11	10-3	66/1	3½ lengths
7th	13	You're Agoodun	Johnny Kavanagh	10	10-8	50/1	18 lengths
8th	14	Royal Predica	Jimmy McCarthy	8	10-8	80/1	28 lengths
9th	12	Streamstown	John McNamara	8	10-8	40/1	13 lengths
10th	34	Birkdale	Jason Maguire	11	10-2	50/1	A distance
11th	24	Mely Moss	Norman Williamson	11	10-2	25/1	Last to complete

== Non-finishers ==
Fence	Number	Horse	Jockey	Age	Handicap	SP	Fate
27th	6	Ad Hoc	Paul Carberry	8	11-1	10/1	Brought down
27th	8	David's Lad	Timmy Murphy	9	11-1	10/1	Fell
27th	35	Spot Thedifference	David Casey	9	10-0	33/1	Unseated rider
27th	36	Djeddah	Thierry Doumen	11	10-0	66/1	Unseated Rider
24th (Canal Turn)	37	Inis Cara	Brian Crowley	10	10-0	66/1	Pulled up
24th (Canal Turn)	17	The Last Fling	Richard McGrath	12	10-6	40/1	Fell
22nd (Becher's Brook)	10	Majed	Barry Fenton	6	10-11	66/1	Fell
20th	32	Ackzo	Dean Gallagher	9	10-0	25/1	Pulled up
20th	5	Lyreen Wonder	Barry Cash	9	11-4	40/1	Unseated Rider
20th	15	Manx Magic	Gerry Supple	9	10-7	100/1	Fell
18th	20	Super Franky	Philip O'Brien	10	10-5	66/1	Fell
17th	27	Murt's Man	Andrew Thornton	8	10-1	66/1	Pulled up
14th	7	Beau	Carl Llewellyn	9	11-1	11/1	Unseated rider
9th (Valentine's)	26	Smarty	Tom Scudamore	9	10-1	16/1	Pulled up
7th (Foinavon)	25	Gun'n Roses II	Marcus Foley	8	10-2	100/1	Fell
6th (Becher's Brook)	2	Alexander Banquet	Barry Geraghty	9	11-11	22/1	Unseated rider
5th	19	Frantic Tan	Tom Jenks	10	10-5	50/1	Unseated Rider
5th	38	Iris Bleu	Paul Moloney	6	10-0	100/1	Fell
4th	28	Niki Dee	Russ Garrity	12	10-0	66/1	Fell
4th	31	Samuel Wilderspin	Tom Doyle	10	10-0	14/1	Fell
1st	1	Marlborough	Mick Fitzgerald	10	11-12	20/1	Fell
1st	9	Paris Pike	Richard Guest	10	10-13	10/1	Fell
1st	11	Inn At The Top	Adie Smith	10	10-8	40/1	Fell
1st	18	Wicked Crack	Conor O'Dwyer	9	10-5	33/1	Fell
1st	23	Struggle's Glory	Ben Hitchott	11	10-3	66/1	Brought down
1st	29	Goguenard	Warren Marston	8	10-0	66/1	Fell
1st	30	Logician	Mark Bradburne	11	10-0	80/1	Brought down
1st	33	Red Ark	Kenny Johnson	9	10-0	50/1	Unseated Rider
1st	39	Carryonharry	Rupert Wakeley	8	10-0	66/1	Fell

== Aftermath ==
Winner Bindaree collected a prize of £290,000 for his owner Raymond Mould, while Aintree reported a record attendance in the modern era of 120,000 spectators over the meeting and 63,000 for the National itself. The Tote also recorded an on-course record turnover of £3 million and both they and bookmakers returned good profits from the defeat of the eight most popular horses.

Manx Magic was fatally injured with a cervical fracture in a fall at the 20th fence, and The Last Fling broke his back falling at the second Canal Turn and was euthanised by vets. Lyreen Wonder also had to be treated by vets after unseating its rider at the 20th fence, the horse ran loose until falling at the 27th fence and seriously injuring itself. The horse never raced again.

Seven riders made their Grand national debut but their openings were all on outsiders, and none completed the course. Ben Hichott parted company with his mount at the first fence and never took part in the race again. Mark Bradburne also fell at the first while the other rookies were Paul Moloney, Marcus Foley, Barry Cash, Gerry Supple and Philip O'Brien.

Former winner Carl Llewellyn was the most experienced rider in the race, weighing out for a Grand National for the 12th time, though he too failed to complete the course on this occasion on leading contender Beau.

=== Quotes ===
Winning jockey Jim Culloty told the press after the race: "When the second horse came by us I thought, "Jesus, we're beat! But Bindaree's as brave as they come, he stuck his neck out and went down the rails. I couldn't in my wildest dreams ever think about winning the National. In an ideal world I would have wanted to up the tempo from three out, but with the loose horse I was having a nightmare. However, [Bindaree] got me out of jail at the last — he's a brilliant jumper."

Second-placed jockey Richard Johnson said: "I was happy to get round for the first time but it was annoying to be caught on the line. He gave me a good ride and he'll be back next year. When I got after him we flew, but we gave the winner a lot of weight and you can't take anything away from my horse."

Tony McCoy, whose horse came home third, said: "I was a bit disappointed because after last year I thought he was the perfect National horse. He's such a good jumper and so intelligent, but looking back he was happier on the soft ground last year than he was this time round."

Noel Fehily, sixth on Celibate, said "It was a brilliant ride. He was foot-perfect and picking up at the Melling Road. I began to think something good was going to happen, then he got tired."

Streamstown's jockey John McNamara, who finished ninth, said: "He jumped around and gave me a brilliant feel and he even had to jump another horse after the Canal Turn. He has run a blinder really on ground which was much too fast for him."

Norman Williamson, the last to complete the course on Mely Moss, said: "He ran a great race and gave me a brilliant ride. He would have finished about sixth but he fell near the finish and I had to remount."

== Media coverage ==
All three days of the meeting were televised live in the United Kingdom by the BBC with the racing on the Thursday and Friday being broadcast on BBC Two before the main Saturday event which was aired on BBC One. The BBC also broadcast a Grand National special edition of its sporting quiz show A Question of Sport the evening before the race. This was immediately followed by a live race preview show, The Night Before the National, on BBC Two, presented by Clare Balding from the pre-National gala dinner at St. George's Hall in Liverpool.

It was the 43rd consecutive year the BBC broadcast the race in a Grand National Grandstand special and was presented by Sue Barker. Running from 1.00pm - 4.45pm, this would be the first year Football Focus and Final Score would not form part of the Grand National day coverage as both became standalone programmes at the start of the 2001/2002 football season. The commentary team remained, John Hanmer, Tony O'Hehir and Jim McGrath, who called the horses home for the fifth year.

Richard Pitman, Peter Scudamore and Tony Dobbin provided in-depth analysis of the race in a slow motion re-run offering views taken from cameras located inside the fences and some jockeys' caps as well as an aerial view. Dobbin stepped in at the last moment after Scudamore was overcome with emotion at the result, being the assistant trainer of the winner. Scudamore did however join Pitman and Dobbin halfway through the review.

BBC Radio covered the race for the 71st year, on the Saturday Sport on Five broadcast hosted by Mark Pougatch and Cornelius Lysaght. The radio commentary team was Ian Bartlett, Peader Flanagan and Dave Smith, with Lee McKenzie calling the runners home for the first time.
