= Kerstin (horse) =

Irish-bred Thoroughbred racehorse

- Sire: Honors Choice
- Grandsire: Embargo
- Dam: Miss Kilcash
- Damsire: Knight of Kilcash
- Sex: Mare
- Foaled: 1950
- Country: Ireland
- Colour: Brown
- Breeder: Con Burke
- Owner: George Moore
- Trainer: Verly Bewicke

Major wins
- National Hunt Handicap Chase (1956); Cheltenham Gold Cup (1958); Hennessy Gold Cup (1959); Imperial Leather Chase (1959)

Kerstin (foaled 1950) was an Irish-bred, British-trained Thoroughbred racehorse and broodmare who won the 1958 Cheltenham Gold Cup. She was imported to England as a young horse and showed early promise by winning over hurdles as a four year old. She showed improvement when campaigned in steeplechases and won the National Hunt Handicap Chase in 1956. She ran four times in the Cheltenham Gold Cup, finishing second in 1957 before becoming the second mare to win the race in the following year. She was unplaced in the net two Gold Cups but produced an outstanding effort to win the Hennessy Gold Cup under 164 pounds in November 1959. After her retirement from racing she had some success as a broodmare.

== Background ==
Kerstin was a brown mare with no white markings bred by Con Burke, of Kilmore, Fethard and reared at the Shanbally Stud in County Tipperary, Ireland. She was the only horse of any consequence sired by the British-bred stallion Honors Choice. Her dam Miss Kilcash came from a family which produced several other good jumpers: her sister Rubia Linda was the dam of the gelding Linwell who became one of Kerstin's biggest rivals.

As a young horse Kerstin was sold privately by and imported to race in England. During her racing career she was owned by George Moore and trained in Northumberland by Calverley "Verly" Bewicke. Kerstin raced at a time when there was no weight allowance for female horses in National Hunt racing, meaning that she raced against male opposition at level weights. Although she was always well-behaved on the track Kerstin was a very temperamental and stubborn horse in training: her regular jockey Stan Hayhurst described her as "a real cow".

== Racing career ==
=== Early career ===
After winning once over hurdles in a novice race at Sedgefield Racecourse in 1954, Kerstin made an immediate impact when campaigned in steeplechasing. On her first appearance at the Cheltenham Festival she won the National Hunt Handicap Chase as a six-year-old in 1956.

Kerstin made progress in the 1956/1957 despite a defeat by her "cousin" Linwell at Hurst Park in October and a disappointing effort in the Great Yorkshire Chase. In March 1957 the mare made her first attempt to win the Cheltenham Gold Cup and started the 6/1 joint favourite with Pointsman. Ridden by George Milburn she tracked the leaders before moving up to join the leaders at the third last. The race appeared to lie between Linwell, Kerstin and Pointsman before the mare sprawled on landing at the second last, badly hampering Pointman. She recovered to jump the last a length behind Linwell but was unable to make further progress up the run-in and was beaten a length into second place.

=== 1957/58 National Hunt season ===
In the following season Kerstin was again aimed at the Gold Cup, but her season began inauspiciously when she started odds-on favourite for the Holt Chase at Worcester and unseated her jockey at the ninth fence. She recorded her only success in the first half of the season when she won the Brocas Chase over three miles at Windsor Racecourse on 24 November.

On 13 March 1958 Kerstin started at odds of 7/1 for the Cheltenham Gold Cup in a nine-runner field which included the previous winners Gay Donald, Limber Hill and Linwell as well as the Broadway Novices' Chase winner Polar Flight. The favourite however, was the French-bred seven-year-old Mandarin who had won the inaugural Hennessy Gold Cup before taking the King George VI Chase. Ridden by Stan Hayhurst the mare took the lead at the fourth fence and made most of the running. The complexion of the race changed completely eight fences from the finish when Mandarin fell and brought down Linwell. Kerstin shook off a challenge from Gay Donald but was then joined by Polar Flight at the second last. The pair raced together over the final two obstacles but Kerstin showed the better speed on the run-in to win by half a length. She became the second mare to win after Ballinode and the second horse trained in the North of England to take the Gold Cup after Limber Hill two years earlier.

=== Later career ===
The mare began her next campaign by finishing second at Ayr Racecourse before running in the Anthony Marshall Chase at Kelso Racecourse in October in which she finished second to Brown Nugget under a weight of 175 pounds. She was then beaten a short head by the six-year-old Taxidermist in the Hennessy Gold Cup at Newbury. Her subsequent training was interrupted by what was described as an "infected foot". Kerstin recovered to make her third appearance in the Gold Cup in March 1959 but finished unplaced behind Roddy Owen. Later that month she carried top weight of 168 pounds in the 1959 Grand National but fell at Becher's Brook on the second circuit. On her final start of the season she finished behind Done Up and Mandarin in the Whitbread Gold Cup.

Kerstin returned to form in November 1959: carrying 164 pounds she won the Hennessy Gold Cup, holding off a strong finish from Brunel II. In the history of the race only Mill House, Arkle, Burrough Hill Lad and Denman have carried more weight to victory. In December she won again, defeating a strong field including Roddy Owen, Done Up and Oxo in the Imperial Leather Chase at Manchester Racecourse. She made a final attempt at the Gold Cup in March, but after leading for most of the way she tired in the closing stages and fell at the last. She was entered in the 1960 Grand National but did not run in the race after she was allotted a weight of 172 pounds.

== Assessment and honours ==
In their book, A Century of Champions, based on the Timeform rating system, John Randall and Tony Morris rated Kerstin an "inferior" Gold Cup winner. She is remembered in the name of Kerstin Close, a residential street in Cheltenham.

== Breeding record ==
At the end of her racing career Kerstin became a broodmare and produced at least three named foals:

- Imperial Leather, a filly, foaled in 1962, sired by Coronation Year.
- Kerstina, filly, 1963, by Coronation Year
- Fashion House, gelding, died 1972, won fourteen races

== Pedigree ==
Pedigree of Kerstin (IRE), brown mare, 1950
Sire Honors Choice (GB) 1935	Embargo (GB); 1923	Argosy	Bachelor's Double
Sire Honors Choice (GB) 1935	Embargo (GB); 1923	Argosy	Fragrant
Sire Honors Choice (GB) 1935	Embargo (GB); 1923	Elland	Marco
Sire Honors Choice (GB) 1935	Embargo (GB); 1923	Elland	Mirfield
Sire Honors Choice (GB) 1935	Thistle Lass (IRE); 1922	Thistleton	Soliman
Sire Honors Choice (GB) 1935	Thistle Lass (IRE); 1922	Thistleton	Fair Jean
Sire Honors Choice (GB) 1935	Thistle Lass (IRE); 1922	Acclida	Acclaim
Sire Honors Choice (GB) 1935	Thistle Lass (IRE); 1922	Acclida	Armida
Dam Miss Kilcash (GB) 1937	Knight of Kilcash (IRE); 1913	The White Knight	Desmond
Dam Miss Kilcash (GB) 1937	Knight of Kilcash (IRE); 1913	The White Knight	Pella
Dam Miss Kilcash (GB) 1937	Knight of Kilcash (IRE); 1913	Kilkenny Lass	Lesterlin
Dam Miss Kilcash (GB) 1937	Knight of Kilcash (IRE); 1913	Kilkenny Lass	Standon Girl
Dam Miss Kilcash (GB) 1937	Toy Fish (GB); 1926	Yutoi	Santoi
Dam Miss Kilcash (GB) 1937	Toy Fish (GB); 1926	Yutoi	She
Dam Miss Kilcash (GB) 1937	Toy Fish (GB); 1926	Candle Fish	Troutbeck
Dam Miss Kilcash (GB) 1937	Toy Fish (GB); 1926	Candle Fish	Candelabra (Family: 17-b)
