= Princess Royal National Hunt Challenge Cup Novices' Handicap Chase =

Steeplechase horse race in Britain

National Hunt Chase Challenge Cup
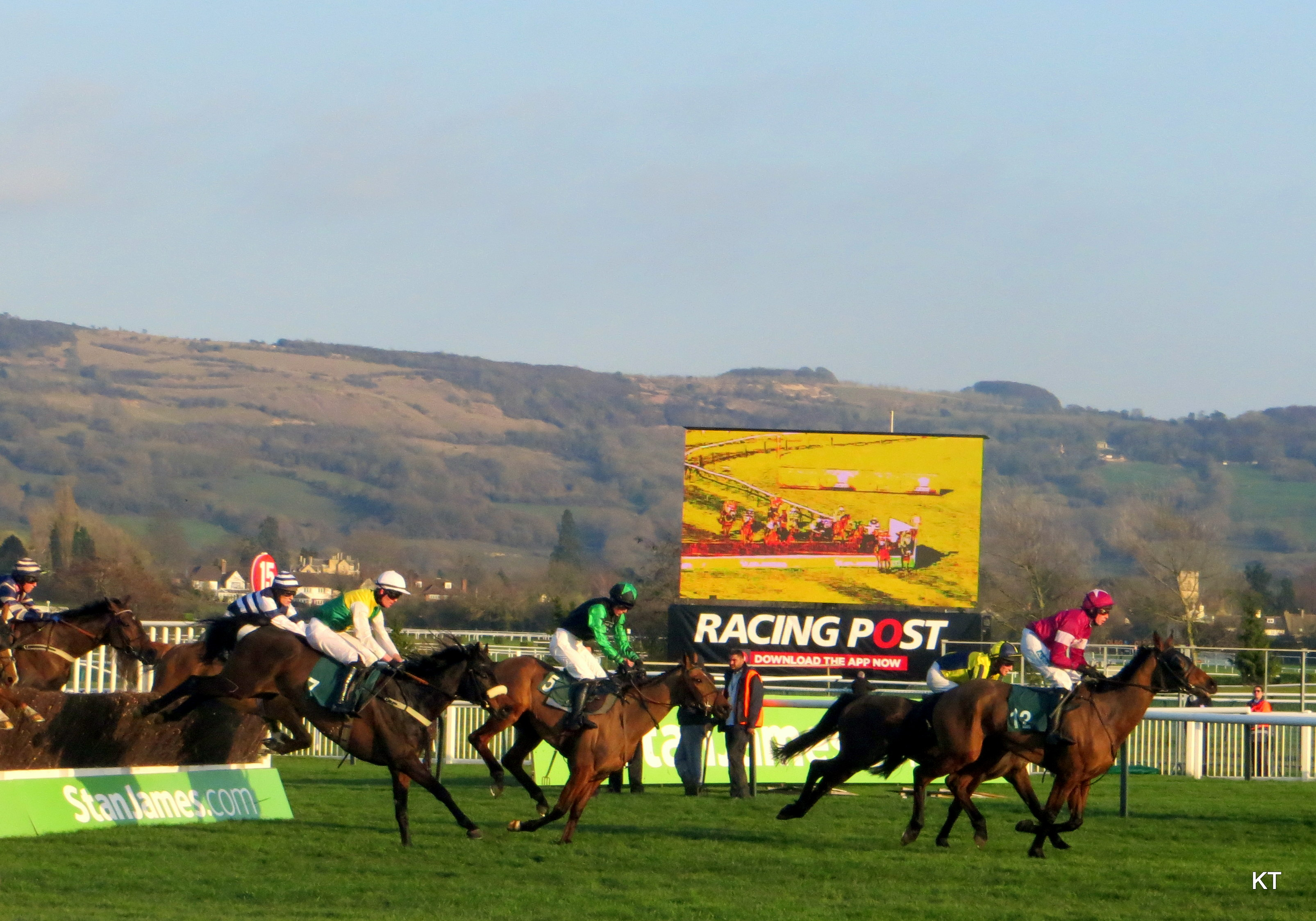
- The 2014 running
- Class: Class 2
- Location: Cheltenham Racecourse; Cheltenham, England
- Inaugurated: 1860
- Race type: Steeplechase
- Website: Cheltenham

Race information
- Distance: 3m 5f 201y
- Surface: Turf
- Track: Left-handed
- Qualification: Five-years-old and up
- Weight: Handicap
- Purse: £100,000 (2025); 1st: £60,388

National Hunt Chase
2026
Holloway Queen	King Of Answers	One Big Bang

Previous years
2025
Haiti Couleurs	Rock My Way	Will Do
2024
Corbetts Cross	Embassy Gardens	Mr Vango
2023
Gaillard Du Mesnil	Chemical Energy	Mister Coffey
2022
Stattler	Run Wild Fred	Vanillier
2021
Galvin	Next Destination	Escaria Ten

2020-2011
2020
Ravenhill	Lord Du Mesnil	Lamanver Pippin
2019
Le Breuil	Discorama	Jerrysback
2018
Rathvinden	Ms Parfois	Sizing Tennessee
2017
Tiger Roll	Missed Approach	Haymount
2016
Minella Rocco	Native River	Measureofmydreams
2015
Cause of Causes	Broadway Buffalo	The Job Is Right
2014
Midnight Prayer	Shotgun Paddy	Suntiep
2013
Back in Focus	Tofino Bay	Godsmejudge
2012
Teaforthree	Harry The Viking	Four Commanders
2011
Chicago Grey	Beshabar	Be There in Five

2010-2001
2010
Poker De Sivola	Becauseicouldntsee	Prudent Honour
2009
Tricky Trickster	Drumconvis	Nine De Sivola
2008
Old Benny	Over The Creek	Back on Line
2007
Butler's Cabin	Character Building	Countess Trifaldi
2006
Hot Weld	Beantown	Far From Trouble
2005
Another Rum	Caislean Ui Cuain	Control Man
2004
Native Emperor	Celestial Gold	Drombeag
2003
Sudden Shock	Stormez	Young Ottoman
2002
Rith Dubh	Timbera	Silver Steel

2000-1991
2000
Relaxation	Inch Rose	Mister One
1999
Deejaydee	Riot Leader	Spot Thedifference
1998
Wandering Light	Thatswhatithought	Torduff Express
1997
Flimsy Truth	Vol Par Nuit	Robsand
1996
Loving Around	Fellow Countryman	Class of Ninetytwo
1995
Front Line	Keano	Lacken Cross
1994
Christmas Gorse	Extra Special	Nearly Splendid
1993
Ushers Island	Claxton Greene	Travelling Wrong
1992
Keep Talking	High Peak	Belmount Captain
1991
Smooth Escort	Windy Ways	Bit Of A Clown

1990-1988
1990
Topsham Bay	Royal Battery	Ballinhassig
1989
Boraceva	Gallic Prince	Leagaune
1988
Over The Road	Caspar Carrot	Good Waters

The National Hunt Challenge Cup is a National Hunt steeplechase in Great Britain which is open to horses aged five years or older. It is run on the Old Course at Cheltenham over a distance of about 3 miles 6 furlongs (3 miles 5 furlongs and 201 yards, or 6,018 metres), and during its running there are twenty-three fences to be jumped. The race is a handicap race for novice chasers, and it is scheduled to take place each year during the Cheltenham Festival in March.

== History ==
Now in its 166th year, the National Hunt Chase has been run more times than any other event at the Cheltenham Festival. The Grand Annual is older, but that race was absent for much of the late 19th century.

During the early part of its history it was held at various venues, including its present home in 1904 and 1905. It was transferred more permanently to Cheltenham in 1911, when it became part of the new two-day National Hunt Meeting. Until the 1930s it was the second most important jumps race in the calendar after the Grand National.

At 3 miles and 7½ furlongs prior to 2020, the distance of the National Hunt Chase was longer than that of any other event at the Festival. It is now the second-longest after the Glenfarclas Cross Country Chase. The race was contested on Cheltenham's New Course from 2005 to 2007, and during this period its length was 4 miles and 1 furlong (6.6 km). The 2008 running was titled the Peter O'Sullevan National Hunt Chase in celebration of the 90th birthday of Peter O'Sullevan, a retired racing commentator and the 2012 running was titled the Diamond Jubilee National Hunt Chase to mark the Diamond Jubilee of Elizabeth II. The 2013 race was run as the John Oaksey National Hunt Chase in memory of John Oaksey, a notable amateur National Hunt jockey and racing journalist who died in September 2012. The National Hunt Chase was given Listed status by the British Horseracing Board from its 2014 running and included the name of former champion jockey Terry Biddlecombe, who died in January 2014, in its title. The 2015 race name commemorated trainer Toby Balding. The race was upgraded to Grade 2 status from the 2017 running.

The race distance was reduced to about 3 miles and 6 furlongs from the 2020 running after a controversy in 2019. Only four of 18 runners finished the 2019 race. Three jockeys were banned by the racecourse stewards for continuing to ride on tired horses, although the bans were subsequently overturned on appeal. The British Horseracing Authority conducted a review of the race which led to a cut in its distance and the number of fences jumped, along with some other changes relating to the eligibility of horses and jockeys to take part. Only professional jockeys competed in the 2021 running as amateur riders were excluded from the Cheltenham Festival due to restrictions on grassroots sport for the COVID-19 pandemic in the United Kingdom.

From 2025 the race will be run as a handicap race and be open to professional riders.

== Records ==
Leading jockey since 1946 (4 wins):

- Patrick Mullins - Back In Focus (2013), Rathvinden (2018), Stattler (2022), Gaillard Du Mesnil (2023)

Leading trainer since 1946 (6 wins):

- Jonjo O'Neill – Front Line (1995), Rith Dubh (2002), Sudden Shock (2003), Native Emperor (2004), Butler's Cabin (2007), Minella Rocco (2016)

== Winners since 1860 ==
- All amateur jockeys except in 2021.

Year	Winner	Age	Jockey	Trainer	Course
1860	Bridegroom	8	Edmund Burton	Mr Burton	Market Harborough
1861	The Freshman	7	George Ede		Cheltenham
1861	Queensferry	5	Edmund Burton	Mr Burton	Market Harborough
1862	Fidget	aged	Thomas Skipworth		Rugby
1863	Socks	7	Alec Goodman	Ben Land	Market Harborough
1864	Game Chicken	6	Capt. Arthur Smith		Burton Lazars
1865	Emperor II	7	Alec Goodman		Wetherby
1866	Shangarry	5	Alec Goodman		Crewkerne
1867	Emperor III	6	Henry Coventry		Bedford
1868	Tathwell	6	William Brockton		Bedford
	no race 1869 (Note: The 1869 race at Wetherby was cancelled due to a ferry tragedy on the River Ure in February)
1870	Schiedam	5	John Maunsell Richardson		Cottenham
1871	Daybreak	5	Capt. Arthur Smith		Burton Lazars
1872	Red Nob	6	Capt. Francis Holyoake		Abergavenny
1873	Pickles	6	Capt. Arthur Tempest		Bristol
1874	Lucellum	5	Capt. Arthur Smith		Aylesbury
1875	Gazelle	4	Mr Richard Flutter		Sandown Park
1876	Burford	5	Lord Marcus Beresford	J. Jones	Bogside
1877	The Bear	4	Ted Wilson	Richard Marsh	Cottenham
1878	Filbert	9	C.R. Friend		Hereford
1879	Bellringer	7	Arthur Coventry		Derby
1880	New Glasgow	7	Capt. Arthur Smith	Mr. Wadlow	Liverpool
1881	Pride of Prussia	4	Ted Wilson	Garrett Moore	Four Oaks Park
1882	Llantarnam	4	Ted Wilson	William Jenkins	Derby
1883	Satellite	4	Ted Wilson	William Jenkins	Little Dalby
1884	Equity	4	Ted Wilson		Leicester
1885	Lady Tempest	5	Willie Beasley	Garrett Moore	Lincoln
1886	Why Not	5	Charles Cunningham		Malton
1887	Monkshood	6	Roddy Owen	Major Meysey Thompson	Derby
1888	Glen Thorpe	4	George Lambton	Mr. Jordan	Sandown Park
1889	Nap	4	Charles Thompson		Cardiff
1890	Innisfail	5	T.G. Arthur	James Ryan	Bogside
1891	Impeyan	4	Capt. Eustace Crawley	J. Swatton	Hurst Park
1892	Royal Buck	5	Lord Royston	Tom Cannon	Derby
1893	Van der Berg	7	Sir Cuthbert Slade	E.A. Craddock	Sandown Park
1894	Philactery	6	Wilfred Ricardo	Joe Cannon	Derby
1895	Fin-ma-Coul II	6	Frank Atkinson	J. Arnold	Sandown Park
1896	Ludgershall	5	Harry Ripley	John Collins	Hurst Park
1897	Nord Ouest	4	Jules Morand	Dick Chaloner	Newmarket
1898	Real Shamrock	4	Edward P. Gundry	A. McKie	Gatwick
1899	Glen Royal	5	John Fergusson	John Collins	Hurst Park
1900	Eoos	5	Arthur Gordon	Mr. Shanahan	Kempton Park
1901	Friar John	5	Herbert Sidney	Mr. Sentence	Burton Lazars
1902	Marpessa	5	Atty Persse	James Maher	Warwick
1903	Comfit	5	Capt. Robert Collis	E. Thomas	Warwick
1904	Timothy Titus	6	Ivor Anthony	E. Morgan	Cheltenham
1905	Miss Clifden II	8	Harry M. Ripley	Mr. Baker	Cheltenham
1906	Count Rufus	7	Arthur Gordon	R. Gordon	Warwick
1907	Red Hall	10	Henry G. Farrant	Henry G. Farrant	Warwick
1908	Rory O'Moore	7	Percy Whitaker	Percy Whitaker	Warwick
1909	Wychwood	11	Peter Roberts	Percy Whitaker	Warwick
1910	Nimble Kate	9	Peter Roberts	Percy Whitaker	Warwick
1911	Sir Halbert	8	Arthur Smith	Tom Coulthwaite	Cheltenham
1912	The Rejected IV	aged	Gilbert Cotton	J.J. Cowap
1913	Kransfugl	11	Robert H. Hall	G. Pirie
1914	War Duke	aged	Harry Ussher	Harry Ussher
1915	Martial IV	7	Major J.H. Purvis	Major J.H. Purvis
	no race 1915–1919 (Note: The race was not held between 1915 and 1919 as Cheltenham was occupied by the military authorities)
1920	Prudhomme	6	Cecil Brabazon	James Daly
1921	Bugler	7	Capt. Geoffrey Bennet	Harry Brown
1922	Conjuror II	10	Cyril Dewhurst	Tom Coulthwaite
1923	Templescoby	8	Harry Brown	Tom Coulthwaite
1924	Patsey V	11	Brian Lemon	Robert Gore
1925	Ardvasar	12	Pat Dennis	Aubrey Hastings
1926	Cloringo	5	William Parker Dutton	Max Barthropp
1927	Fine Yarn	7	J. Stevens	C. Stevens
1928	Cryptical	13	Major T.F. Cavenagh	F.H. Bowcher
1929	Big Wonder	9	Capt. Henry Weber	G.S.L. Whitelaw
1930	Sir Lindsay	9	Lord Fingall	Jack Anthony
1931	Merriment IV	9	Lord Haddington	Stewart Wight
1932	Robin-a-Tiptoe	11	Frank Furlong	Mr. Gale
1933	Ego	6	Perry Harding	Lt.-Col. M. Lindsay
1934	Crown Prince	9	Lord Belper	Cliff Beechener
1935	Rod and Gun	8	Hywell Jones	Jack Anthony
1936	Pucka Belle	10	Eric W.W. Bailey	Eric W.W. Bailey
1937	Hopeful Hero	9	W.L. Dawes	H.A.J. Silley
1938	St George II	9	Bobby Petre	A.J.G. Leveson-Gower
1939	Litigant	8	Richard Black	Frank Furlong
	no race 1940–1945 (Note: The race was not held between 1940 and 1945 due to the Second World War)
1946	Prattler	11	Dermot Daly	Tom Yates
1947	Maltese Wanderer	8	Dermot Daly	Tom Yates
1948	Bruno II	8	Guy Cunard	William Anstruther-Gray
1949	Castledermot	7	Lord Mildmay	Vincent O'Brien
1950	Ellesmere	7	Atty Corbett	Ken Cundell
1951	Cushendun	6	Peter Chisman	Bobby Renton
1952	Frosty Knight	6	Charles Straker	Ian Straker
1953	Pontage	7	Bunny Cox	Dan Moore
1954	Quare Times	8	Bunny Cox	Vincent O'Brien
1955	Reverend Prince	9	C. Pocock	Peter Dufosee
1956	Rosana III	9	Jeremy Everitt	Jeremy Everitt
1957	Kari Sou	8	Alan Lillingston	Archie Thomlinson
1958	Spud Tamson	7	Geordie Dun	Tommy Dun
1959	Sabaria	8	John Lawrence	Bob Turnell
1960	Proud Socks	8	H. Thompson	Vivian Bishop
1961	Superfine	8	Sir William Pigott-Brown	Frank Cundell
1962	Go Slow	7	George Small	Albert Piper
1963	Time	8	Ian Balding	Willie Stephenson
1964	Dorimont	10	Charles Vaughan	Tom Taaffe
1965	Red Vale	11	George Small	Albert Piper
1966	Polaris Missile	7	John Thorne	John Thorne
1967	Master Tammy	9	Brian Fanshawe	George Guilding
1968	Fascinating Forties	9	Michael Dickinson	George Owen
1969	Lizzy the Lizard	10	Grant Cann	Tony Hartnoll
1970	Domason	7	Robert Alner	Harry Dufosee
1971	Deblin's Green	8	Derek Edmunds	George Yardley
1972	Charley Winking	7	Derrick Scott	Leslie Scott
1973	Foreman	7	Bill Shand Kydd	Harry Thomson Jones
1974	Mr Midland	7	Mouse Morris	Edward O'Grady
	no race 1975 (Note: The 1975 edition was cancelled as the course was waterlogged)
1976	Sage Merlin	8	Peter Greenall	Jack Hardy
1977	Alpenstock	10	Dick Saunders	Stan Mellor
1978	Gay Tie	5	John Fowler	Mick O'Toole
1979	Arctic Ale	8	John Fowler	Dan Moore
1980	Waggoners Walk	11	Tony Fowler	Caroline Mason
1981	Lucky Vane	6	Stephen Bush	Toby Balding
1982	Hazy Dawn	7	Willie Mullins	Paddy Mullins
1983	Bit of a Skite	7	Frank Codd	Edward O'Grady
1984	Macks Friendly	7	Willie Mullins	Paddy Mullins
1985	Northern Bay	9	Tony Fowler	Tom Bill
1986	Omerta	6	Lorcan Wyer	Homer Scott
1987	Mighty Mark	8	Jimmy Walton	Frank Walton
1988	Over the Road	7	Tom Costello	Terry Casey
1989	Boraceva	6	Seamus Mullins	Toby Balding
1990	Topsham Bay	7	Paul Hacking	David Barons
1991	Smooth Escort	7	Tony Martin	Di Haine
1992	Keep Talking	7	Marcus Armytage	Tim Thomson Jones
1993	Ushers Island	7	Noel Wilson	Howard Johnson
1994	Christmas Gorse	8	Marcus Armytage	Nick Gaselee
1995	Front Line	8	John Berry	Jonjo O'Neill
1996	Loving Around	8	Philip Fenton	Edward O'Grady
1997	Flimsy Truth	11	Micky Harris	Martin Weston
1998	Wandering Light	9	Rupert Wakley	Tim Forster
1999	Deejaydee	7	Tony Martin	Michael Hourigan
2000	Relaxation	8	Mark Bradburne	Henry Daly
	no race 2001 (Note: The 2001 running was cancelled because of a foot-and-mouth crisis)
2002	Rith Dubh	10	JT McNamara	Jonjo O'Neill
2003	Sudden Shock	8	Denis Cullen	Jonjo O'Neill
2004	Native Emperor	8	Robert Widger	Jonjo O'Neill
2005	Another Rum	7	Mark O'Hare	Ian Duncan
2006	Hot Weld	7	Richard Harding	Ferdy Murphy
2007	Butler's Cabin	7	Alan Berry	Jonjo O'Neill
2008	Old Benny	7	Charlie Huxley	Alan King
2009	Tricky Trickster	6	Sam Waley-Cohen	Nigel Twiston-Davies
2010	Poker de Sivola	7	Katie Walsh	Ferdy Murphy
2011	Chicago Grey	8	Derek O'Connor	Gordon Elliott
2012	Teaforthree	8	JT McNamara	Rebecca Curtis
2013	Back in Focus	8	Patrick Mullins	Willie Mullins
2014	Midnight Prayer	9	Joshua Newman	Alan King
2015	Cause of Causes	7	Jamie Codd	Gordon Elliott
2016	Minella Rocco	6	Derek O'Connor	Jonjo O'Neill
2017	Tiger Roll	7	Lisa O'Neill	Gordon Elliott
2018	Rathvinden	10	Patrick Mullins	Willie Mullins
2019	Le Breuil	7	Jamie Codd	Ben Pauling
2020	Ravenhill	10	Jamie Codd	Gordon Elliott
2021	Galvin	7	Jack Kennedy	Ian Ferguson
2022	Stattler	7	Patrick Mullins	Willie Mullins
2023	Gaillard Du Mesnil	7	Patrick Mullins	Willie Mullins
2024	Corbetts Cross	7	Derek O'Connor	Emmet Mullins
2025	Haiti Couleurs	8	Ben Jones	Rebecca Curtis
2026	Holloway Queen	6	James Bowen	Nicky Henderson

== See also ==
- Horse racing in Great Britain
- List of British National Hunt races
