= 1990 Grand National =

English steeplechase horse race

- Grand National
- Location: Aintree Racecourse
- Date: 7 April 1990
- Winning horse: (England) Mr Frisk
- Starting price: 16/1
- Jockey: (England) Mr. Marcus Armytage
- Trainer: Kim Bailey
- Owner: H.J. Duffey
- Conditions: Firm

External videos
- Replay of the final stages of the 1990 Grand National BBC Sport
- 1990 Grand National in full BBC Sport

The 1990 Grand National (officially known as the Seagram Grand National for sponsorship reasons) was the 144th renewal of the Grand National horse race that took place at Aintree Racecourse near Liverpool, England, on 7 April 1990. The off time was 3.20pm.

Mr. Frisk won the race in a time of 8 minutes and 47.80 seconds, breaking Red Rum's 1973 record by 14.10 seconds. He was ridden by amateur jockey Marcus Armytage. This record still stands, even though the race has been 342 yd (312.72 m) shorter since 2013.

Second was Durham Edition, and third Rinus. The 7/1 favourite Brown Windsor finished fourth. In fifth was Lastofthebrownies, ridden by Charlie Swan, and Richard Dunwoody rode Bigsun home in sixth place.

There were two equine fatalities during the race. Roll-A-Joint fell at the first Canal Turn, breaking his neck and dying almost instantly, while Hungary Hur incurred a leg fracture while running towards the 19th fence, pulled up and was euthanised.

== Leading contenders ==
Brown Windsor was made 7/1 favourite after a year which had seen him win the Whitbread Gold Cup and finish narrowly beaten in the Hennessy Cognac Gold Cup at Newbury. Under the guidance of John White he had every chance jumping the Canal Turn second time in fourth place but was unable to make any further impression on the leader along the Canal side and by the time they turned for the penultimate fence he was beaten, maintaining his fourth place to the finish. Brown Windsor did not race again until 1992 with a series of prep races before a second tilt at the National when he was again among the leading contenders only to fall at Becher's first time. He never again attempted the National but did return three times for the Fox Hunters Chase, being beaten second in both 1994 and 1995 before being brought down in what proved his final race in 1996. Brown Windsor was retired to the hunting field and died at the age of twenty-four in 2006.

Durham Edition was backed down to 9/1 having won both the Charlie Hall Memorial Pattern Chase at Wetherby in November and the Rowland Meyrick Handicap Chase at the same course in December, having previously proven himself in the National, finishing second in 1988 and fifth in 1989. Once again partnered by Chris Grant, he tracked the first circuit in mid division, moving up to eighth jumping the Chair before creeping into closer contention on the second circuit. By the time the Canal Turn was reached he was fifth and crossing the Melling Road moved into second to issue a challenge to the eventual winner at the final fence. The horse gave his backers every chance on the run in but was unable to close down a length disadvantage and ended beaten second for the second time in three Nationals. Durham Edition returned for a fourth and final attempt at the National in 1991, finishing sixth.

Bigsun came into popular support and shared favouritism until minutes before the race, going off at 15/2. He arrived at Aintree as the winner of the Ritz Club Chase at the Cheltenham Festival three weeks earlier and in addition had been given the minimum 10 stone to carry by jockey Richard Dunwoody, albeit the Ulsterman weighed out 2 lbs overweight. In the race itself Bigsun turned for the second circuit in the main pack but was always trailing the leaders without ever getting into a challenging position. His finishing position of sixth was as close as he was at any point of the race.

Rinus came to Aintree having won the Greenall Whitley Gold Cup at Haydock Park in February under Richard Dunwoody but with the Ulsterman opting to ride Bigsun, the mount went to Neale Doughty who had previously won the race and never failed to complete the course. Sent off at 13/1 they moved into the leading half dozen as the runners came to the Canal Turn for the first time and stayed in touch with the leader throughout. Rinus moved up into a distant second place at the fourth fence from home but was never able to close a ten length advantage built up by the winner and was passed going to the second last flight by the eventual second before staying on, one paced to finish third.

Call Collect had won the previous years Topham Chase over one circuit of the course. Questions over his stamina were answered when he won the Cheltenham Foxhunter Chase three weeks before coming to Aintree. Public confidence in his chances began to fade in the hours before the race as it was thought the ground conditions might not be in his favour. In partnership with his amateur rider, Mr Ray Martin, the pair went off at 14/1 but were well to the rear throughout the race before making ground through the tiring field to finish seventh, getting their only mention from the television commentator as they passed the post.

Ghofar and Brendan Powell came to Aintree having won the Hennessy Cognac Gold Cup at Newbury the previous year, having beaten Brown Windsor in the process. They set off at 14/1 but were another who never got into contention before finishing a remote fourteenth.

Next in the market came three 16/1 shots, which included Mr Frisk, the winner of the Ascot Punch Bowl Amateur Chase the previous November. The firm ground on the day made him a very popular each-way chance on the day in company with his amateur rider, Racing Post correspondent, Marcus Armytage. They were up among the leaders throughout the race, being left fifteen lengths clear when co-leader, Uncle Merlin - another 16/1 shot - unseated at Becher's Brook on the second circuit. Although challenged on the run in by Durham Edition, they remained in front to win in a record time of 8 minutes 47.80 seconds, which still stands despite the race distance being reduced since 2013.

The other 16/1 shot was Bonanza Boy who won both the 1988 and 1989 Welsh Grand Nationals. He finished well back in 16th and was entered for the next three Grand Nationals - including the race that never was.

== Course changes ==
In the aftermath of two equine fatalities at Becher's Brook in the previous years National (Brown Trix and Seeandem), it was decided to make modifications to the fence. The ditch into which Captain Becher himself had fallen one hundred and fifty-one years earlier was filled in. The bend away from the fence was also softened.

== Finishing order ==
Position	Name	Jockey	Age	Weight	SP	Distance
1st	Mr Frisk	Mr. Marcus Armytage	11	10-06	16/1	Won by ¾ length
2nd	Durham Edition	Chris Grant	12	10-09	9/1	20 lengths
3rd	Rinus	Neale Doughty	9	10-04	13/1	12 lengths
4th	Brown Windsor	John White	8	10–10	7/1 F	½ length
5th	Lastofthebrownies	Charlie Swan	10	10-00	20/1	25 lengths
6th	Bigsun	Richard Dunwoody	9	10-02	15/2	1½ lengths
7th	Call Collect	Mr. Ray Martin	9	10-05	14/1	12 lengths
8th	Bartres	Michael Bowlby	11	10-00	66/1	
9th	Sir Jest	Brian Storey	12	10-00	66/1	
10th	West Tip	Peter Hobbs	13	10–11	20/1	
11th	Team Challenge	Ben De Haan	8	10-00	50/1	
12th	Charter Hardware	Norman Williamson	8	10-00	66/1	
13th	Gallic Prince	Mr. Jose Simo (ESP)	11	10-04	100/1	
14th	Ghofar	Brendan Powell	7	10-00	14/1	
15th	Course Hunter	Graham Bradley	12	10-00	66/1	
16th	Bonanza Boy	Peter Scudamore	9	11-09	16/1	
17th	Solares	Mr. P McMahon	10	10-00	150/1	
18th	Gee-A	Declan Murphy	11	10-02	66/1	
19th	Mick's Star	Seamus O'Neill	10	10-01	66/1	
20th	Bob Tisdall	Kevin Mooney	11	10-05	66/1	

== Non-finishers ==
Fence	Name	Jockey	Age	Weight	SP	Fate
1st	Gala's Image	John Shortt	10	10-00	66/1	Fell
3rd	Conclusive	Steve Smith Eccles	11	10-04	28/1	Fell
3rd	Thinking Cap	Pat Malone	9	10-00	100/1	Fell
6th (Becher's Brook)	Torside	Jimmy Frost	11	10-03	66/1	Pulled up
6th (Becher's Brook)	Lanavoe	Pat Leech	11	10-00	100/1	Fell
7th (Foinavon's)	Young Driver	Jimmy Duggan	13	10-04	150/1	Pulled up
8th (Canal Turn)	Roll-A-Joint	Simon McNeill	12	10-00	28/1	Fell (fatally)
13th	Star's Delight	Jonathon Lower	8	10-00	50/1	Pulled up
14th	Gainsay	Mark Pitman	11	10-07	66/1	Fell
14th	Monanore	Tom Taaffe	13	10-05	100/1	Carried out (after fence)
15th (The Chair)	Huntworth	Mr. Alan Walter	10	10-09	66/1	Fell
19th	Joint Sovereignty	Lorcan Wyer	10	10-01	50/1	Unseated rider
19th	Hungary Hur	Tommy Carmody	11	11-02	50/1	Pulled up (later euthanised)
21st	Against the Grain	Jamie Osborne	9	10-00	25/1	Pulled up
22nd (Becher's Brook)	Uncle Merlin (USA)	Hywel Davies	9	10-03	16/1	Unseated rider
23rd (Foinavon's)	Polyfemus	Richard Rowe	8	10-02	18/1	Pulled up
26th	Nautical Joke	Kenny Johnson	11	10-00	66/1	Unseated rider
26th	Pukka Major (USA)	Mark Richards	9	10-04	50/1	Unseated rider

== Media coverage and aftermath ==
It's Mr Frisk from Durham Edition as they race towards the elbow. Durham Edition - is he gonna win on Arthur Stephenson's 70th birthday? He's making ground all the time towards the stand side, but Mr Frisk is homing in at the moment. They've got 150 yards to run. Mr Frisk from Durham Edition, as they race towards the line, Mr Frisk is gonna win it, Mr Frisk has won it!

— Commentator Peter O'Sullevan describes the climax of the race

The BBC broadcast the race live on television for the thirty-first consecutive year as part of its regular Saturday afternoon Grandstand programme, in a Grand National special. Des Lynam was the anchor presenter, interviewing the connections of the competitors and celebrity race goers before handing over to Richard Pitman and Bill Smith who gave a guide to the runners as they prepared for the race. The television commentary team was unchanged for the nineteenth consecutive year in John Hanmer, Julian Wilson and lead commentator, Peter O'Sullevan who was calling his forty-fifth Grand National.

Richard Pitman and Bill Smith took television viewers through a detailed rerun of the race using camera angles not used during the running of the race itself, including a camera from a helicopter and cameras inside the first fence and the chair.

There was criticism of Julian Wilson's commentary for the second consecutive year when he referred to the body of the horse Roll-A-Joint, which had suffered a fatal fall on the first circuit, as a "major obstruction" when the runners went to jump the Canal Turn second time. The horse's body had been moved a few feet away from the landing side of the fence and covered with a tarpaulin, made clearly visible to viewers in the slow-motion replay afterwards.

The race was also broadcast live on BBC Radio for the fifty-ninth time as part of its Saturday Sport programme and for the final time on Radio Two. The BBC moved the programme to the newly launched BBC Radio Five the following year.

All of the major national UK and Ireland daily newspapers carried extensive pre-race coverage in their Saturday editions. Many included full colour race card style guides.

Among the fifteen riders making their debut in the race were Norman Williamson, Charlie Swan, Lorcan Wyer and Jamie Osborne, all of whom would finish second in future Grand Nationals.

As a prominent racing journalist and author, Marcus Armytage has written extensively about the Grand National and his victory in it. In 2010 while writing for the Daily Telegraph he wrote "At Becher's second time everything changed. I was wondering if I'd ever be able to get past Uncle Merlin when he pecked. As I went past Hywel (Davies – jockey of Uncle Merlin) was half on, half off and I assumed he would rejoin me shortly. I was unaware gravity won the argument. (Davies had been unseated)" Armytage also explained to Channel Four how he nearly completely underestimated the runner up. "I was well clear [at the second last fence] but then first heard the noise of other horses. If you look back at the footage, Chris [Grant], on Durham Edition and Neale Doughty, on Rinus have a chat and Neale was telling Chris 'You've got him'. I actually thought the horse behind was Team Challenge, which was one of the slowest finishers in the field so I wasn't worried. The blessing was that I didn't look back and see Chris."

Davies himself told the press that he was convinced Uncle Merlin would have won but for the fall at Bechers. A further claim that they would be back next year to win went unfulfilled.
