= 1992 Cheltenham Gold Cup =

The 1992 Cheltenham Gold Cup was a horse race which took place at Cheltenham on Thursday 12 March 1992. It was the 65th running of the Cheltenham Gold Cup, and it was won by Cool Ground. The winner was ridden by Adrian Maguire and trained by Toby Balding. The pre-race favourite Carvill's Hill finished fifth.

It was a controversial result, as some observers felt that the rank outsider Golden Freeze was ridden with the intention of unsettling Carvill's Hill by jumping alongside him at every fence.

== Race details ==
- Sponsor: Tote
- Winner's prize money: £95,533.00
- Going: Good
- Number of runners: 8
- Winner's time: 6m 47.6s

== Full result ==
	*	Horse	Age	Jockey	Trainer ^{†}	SP
1		Cool Ground	10	Adrian Maguire	Toby Balding	25/1
2	shd	The Fellow	7	Adam Kondrat	François Doumen (FR)	7/2
3	1	Docklands Express	10	Mark Perrett	Kim Bailey	16/1
4	dist	Toby Tobias	10	Mark Pitman	Jenny Pitman	15/2
5	dist	Carvill's Hill	10	Peter Scudamore	Martin Pipe	Evens fav
PU	Fence 20	Norton's Coin	11	Graham McCourt	Sirrel Griffiths	33/1
PU	Fence 16	Golden Freeze	10	Michael Bowlby	Jenny Pitman	150/1
UR	Fence 15	Kings Fountain	9	Anthony Tory	Kim Bailey	8/1

* The distances between the horses are shown in lengths or shorter. shd = short-head; PU = pulled-up; UR = unseated rider.
† Trainers are based in Great Britain unless indicated.

== Winner's details ==
Further details of the winner, Cool Ground:

- Foaled: 1982 in Great Britain
- Sire: Over the River; Dam: Merry Spring (Merrymount)
- Owner: Whitcombe Manor Racing Stables Ltd
- Breeder: N. J. Connors
