= Marcus Armytage =

British jockey

Marcus Armytage [born 17 July 1964 (age 60)] is a journalist and former National Hunt jockey who won the Grand National as an amateur in 1990, riding Mr Frisk. He was educated at Scaitcliffe School and Eton College. Armytage's win in the 1990 Grand National on Mr Frisk came in a record time of 8m 47.80sec. It remains now the only sub nine-minute National, smashing Red Rum's previous record from 1973 by some 14 seconds, even though the race has been shortened since 2013. Armytage was the last amateur rider to win the race until 2022, when Sam Waley-Cohen won on Noble Yeats.

Mr Frisk and Armytage went on to complete the unique National-Whitbread Gold Cup double at Sandown Park Racecourse three weeks later. The same year, 1990, he was Fegentri European Champion Amateur. In 1992 he repeated a feat achieved by his sister Gee in 1987 by riding a double at the Cheltenham Festival, winning the Fulke Walwyn Kim Muir Challenge Cup on Tug of Gold and National Hunt Chase Challenge Cup on Keep Talking. His third Festival winner was on Christmas Gorse in the National Hunt Chase in 1994. He retired in 2000 after riding his 100th winner – in Dubai.

His father was Roddy Armytage, a racehorse trainer based in East Ilsley, near Newbury, and his mother was Sue Armytage, who as Sue Whitehead was an international showjumper. His younger sister Gee was also a National Hunt jockey.

== Education ==
He attended Eton College in same generation as politicians Boris Johnson and David Cameron. He used to slip out of college to ride at Windsor Races as a fledgling amateur jockey. He went on to attend the Royal Agricultural College, Cirencester, (irregularly) before graduating with a diploma in Rural Estate Management.

== Journalism ==
He started writing while at agricultural college for the Newbury Weekly News. He joined the Racing Post as Newmarket correspondent in 1990 and left to join the Daily Telegraph racing team in 1993 and remains a racing correspondent there. He also contributes a column to Horse and Hound. He was champion tipster for the 2008-09 jump season.

== Personal life ==
He married Amber in 2003. He has three children: Arthur, born in 2004; Molly, born in 2006; and Arabella, born in 2011.
