= Bindaree =

Irish-bred Thoroughbred racehorse (1994–2024)

- Sire: Roselier
- Grandsire: Misti
- Dam: Flowing Tide
- Damsire: Main Reef
- Sex: Gelding
- Foaled: 22 March 1994
- Died: September 2024 (aged 30)
- Country: Ireland
- Colour: Chestnut
- Breeder: Noel King
- Owner: Raymond Mould
- Trainer: Nigel Twiston-Davies
- Record: 40-9-5-4
- Earnings: £480,991

Major wins
- Bristol Novices' Hurdle (1999); Challow Novices' Hurdle (1999); Rising Stars Novices' Chase (2000); Grand National (2002); Welsh National (2003)
- Last updated on April 5, 2008

Bindaree (1994 – September 2024) was an Irish-bred Thoroughbred racehorse who was the winner of the 2002 Grand National when ridden by Jim Culloty and the 2003 Welsh Grand National when partnered by Carl Llewellyn. Bindaree died in September 2024, at the age of 30.

== Pedigree ==
Pedigree of Bindaree
| Sire Roselier 1973 | Misti 1958 | Medium | Meridien |
| Sire Roselier 1973 | Misti 1958 | Medium | Melodie |
| Sire Roselier 1973 | Misti 1958 | Mist | Tornado |
| Sire Roselier 1973 | Misti 1958 | Mist | La Touche |
| Sire Roselier 1973 | Peace Rose 1959 | Fastnet Rock | Ocean Swell |
| Sire Roselier 1973 | Peace Rose 1959 | Fastnet Rock | Stone of Fortune |
| Sire Roselier 1973 | Peace Rose 1959 | La Paix | Seven Seas |
| Sire Roselier 1973 | Peace Rose 1959 | La Paix | Anne de Bretagne |
| Dam Flowing Tide 1985 | Main Reef 1976 | Mill Reef | Never Bend |
| Dam Flowing Tide 1985 | Main Reef 1976 | Mill Reef | Milan Mill |
| Dam Flowing Tide 1985 | Main Reef 1976 | Lovely Light | Henry the Seventh |
| Dam Flowing Tide 1985 | Main Reef 1976 | Lovely Light | Queen of Light |
| Dam Flowing Tide 1985 | Helm 1973 | Royal Palace | Ballymoss |
| Dam Flowing Tide 1985 | Helm 1973 | Royal Palace | Crystal Palace |
| Dam Flowing Tide 1985 | Helm 1973 | Ripeck | Ribot |
| Dam Flowing Tide 1985 | Helm 1973 | Ripeck | Kyak |
