= The White Knight (horse) =

British Thoroughbred racehorse

- Sire: Desmond
- Grandsire: St Simon
- Dam: Pella
- Damsire: Buckshot
- Sex: Stallion
- Foaled: 1903
- Colour: Bay
- Owner: Tom Kirkwood
- Earnings: £14,197

Major wins
- Coronation Cup (1907, 1908); Goodwood Cup (1907); Ascot Gold Cup (1907, 1908)

The White Knight (foaled 1903) was a Thoroughbred racehorse which won the Ascot Gold Cup in 1907 and 1908.

The White Knight started 22 races, of which he won ten. These included the Queen's Vase and the Newbury Autumn Cup (in 1906, as a three-year-old); the Coronation Cup (in both 1907 and 1908), the Goodwood Cup (1907), and the Ascot Gold Cup (in 1907 and 1908). The White Knight was the first horse to win the Ascot Gold Cup twice since Isonomy in 1880.

The White Knight was subsequently put to stud, and his descendants include Kerstin (great-grandson, foaled 1950).

In 1925, the London & North Eastern Railway began a tradition of naming locomotives after winning racehorses, and most Class A1 4-6-2 locomotives received racehorse names in 1925–26. During this period no. 2576 (built October 1924, later British Railways no. 60077) was given the name The White Knight after this horse; it remained in service until July 1964.

== Pedigree ==
Pedigree of The White Knight (GB), bay stallion, 1903
Sire Desmond (GB) 1896	St Simon; 1881	Galopin; 1872	Vedette
Sire Desmond (GB) 1896	St Simon; 1881	Galopin; 1872	Flying Duchess
Sire Desmond (GB) 1896	St Simon; 1881	St Angela; 1865	King Tom
Sire Desmond (GB) 1896	St Simon; 1881	St Angela; 1865	Adeline
Sire Desmond (GB) 1896	L'Abbesse de Jouarre; 1886	Trappist; 1872	Hermit
Sire Desmond (GB) 1896	L'Abbesse de Jouarre; 1886	Trappist; 1872	Bunch
Sire Desmond (GB) 1896	L'Abbesse de Jouarre; 1886	Festive; 1877	Carnival
Sire Desmond (GB) 1896	L'Abbesse de Jouarre; 1886	Festive; 1877	Piercy
Dam Pella (IRE) 1891	Buckshot; 1879	Solon; 1881	West Australian
Dam Pella (IRE) 1891	Buckshot; 1879	Solon; 1881	Mrs. Ridgway
Dam Pella (IRE) 1891	Buckshot; 1879	Magdalene; 1870	Plum Pudding (IRE)
Dam Pella (IRE) 1891	Buckshot; 1879	Magdalene; 1870	Frailty (IRE)
Dam Pella (IRE) 1891	Pamela (IRE); 1880	King John (IRE); 1871	King John
Dam Pella (IRE) 1891	Pamela (IRE); 1880	King John (IRE); 1871	Marlyon
Dam Pella (IRE) 1891	Pamela (IRE); 1880	Eblana (IRE); 1871	Ai (IRE)
Dam Pella (IRE) 1891	Pamela (IRE); 1880	Eblana (IRE); 1871	Sheelah (IRE)
