= Anthony Mildmay, Peter Cazalet Memorial Chase =

Mildmay Cazalet Handicap Chase
2000
Lancastrian Jet	Jocks Cross	Gigi Beach

Previous years
1999
Eudipe	Glitter Isle	Callisoe Bay
1998
Him Of Praise	Call It A Day	Hermes Harvest
1996
Superior Finish	Sibton Abbey	Greenhil Tare Away
1995
Deep Bramble	Riverside Boy	Mr Boston
1993
Rushing Wild	Cool Ground	Nick The Brief
1992
Arctic Call	Givus A Buck	Rowlandsons Jewels
1991
Cool Ground	Docklands Express	Sam Da Vinci

1990-1988
1990
Cool Ground	Nick The Brief	Rowlandsons Jewels
1989
Mr Frisk	Run And Skip	Castle Warden
1988
Rhyme 'N' Reason	Queensway Boy	The Langholm Dyer

The Anthony Mildmay, Peter Cazalet Memorial Chase was a National Hunt handicap chase in England which was open to horses aged five years and older.

It was run at Sandown Park over a distance of 3 miles and 5½ furlongs (5,934 metres), and was scheduled to take place each year in January. The race was named after the Queen Mother's trainer, Peter Cazalet, and his amateur jockey, Anthony Mildmay.

The race was first run in March 1951 over a distance of 3 miles 125 yards and was last run under this name in 2000, although the race was also scheduled, but abandoned, in 2001, 2002 and 2003. It was renamed the "Marathon Chase" which in turn was renamed the "London National". It is now held at the December meeting on the same card as the Tingle Creek Chase.

== Winners ==
Year	Winner	Age	Weight	Jockey	Trainer
1951 (Note: The first running was over a distance of 3 miles 125 yards)	Roimond	10	11-12	Tim Molony	George Beeby
1952	Cromwell	11	11-10	Bryan Marshall	Peter Cazalet
1953	Whispering Steel	8	11-03	Rene Emery	A Kilpatrick
1954	Domata	8	10–12	Atty Corbett	Frank Cundell
1955	Abandoned because of snow and frost
1956	Linwell	8	09-09	Rex Hamey	Charlie Mallon
1957	Much Obliged	9	10–12	Harry East	Neville Crump
1958	Polar Flight	8	10-07	George Slack	G Spann
1959	Abandoned because of snow and frost
1960	Team Spirit	8	09-10	Willie Robinson	Dan Moore (Ir)
1961	Mac Joy	9	10-07	Michael Scudamore	K Bailey
1962	Duke of York	7	10–12	Mr Derrick Scott	J Tilling
1963	Abandoned because of snow and frost
1964	Dormant	7	10–12	Pat Buckley	Neville Crump
1965	Freddie	8	10-05	Pat McCarron	R Tweedie
1966	What A Myth	9	12-00	Paul Kelleway	H. Ryan Price
1967	Abandoned because of frost
1968	Stalbridge Colonist	9	12-00	Stan Mellor	Ken Cundell
1969	Abandoned because of fog
1970	Larbawn	11	11–13	Josh Gifford	M L Marsh
1971	Abandoned because of frost
1972	Royal Toss	10	11-04	Nigel Wakley	H Handel
1973	Midnight Fury	7	10-00	Vic Soane	Fred Winter
1974	High Ken	8	10-04	Bob Davies	John Edwards
1975	Money Market	8	10–11	Jeff King	Verley Bewicke
1976	Money Market	9	11-00	Ron Barry	Verley Bewicke
1977	Zeta's Son	8	11-07	Ron Barry	Peter Bailey
1978	Shifting Gold	9	11-04	John Francome	Kim Bailey
1979	Abandoned because of snow and frost
1980	Modesty Forbids	8	10-02	Richard Rowe	Josh Gifford
1981	Peter Scot	10	10-09	Paul Barton	David Gandolfo
1982	Abandoned because of frost and snow
1983	Fifty Dollars More	8	11-05	Richard Linley	Fred Winter
1984	Burrough Hill Lad	8	10-09	John Francome	Jenny Pitman
1985	West Tip	8	10-01	Richard Dunwoody	Michael Oliver
1986	Run And Skip	8	11-01	Peter Scudamore	John Spearing
1987	Stearsby	8	11-05	Graham McCourt	Jenny Pitman
1988	Rhyme 'N' Reason	9	10-07	Colin Brown	David Elsworth
1989	Mr Frisk	10	10–13	Richard Dunwoody	Kim Bailey
1990	Cool Ground	8	10-05	Anthony Tory	Richard Mitchell
1991	Cool Ground	9	10–11	Luke Harvey	Reg Akehurst
1992	Arctic Call	9	11-06	Jamie Osborne	Oliver Sherwood
1993	Rushing Wild	8	10-01	Peter Scudamore	Martin Pipe
1994	Abandoned due to waterlogged state of course
1995	Deep Bramble	8	10-06	Chris Maude	Paul Nicholls
1996	Superior Finish	10	10–09	Adrian Maguire	Jenny Pitman
1997	Abandoned due to frost
1998	Him of Praise	8	10-10	Jimmy McCarthy	Oliver Sherwood
1999	Eudipe	7	12-00	Tony McCoy	Martin Pipe
2000	Lancastrian Jet	9	10-10	Andrew Thornton	Henry Daly
2001	Abandoned due to waterlogged state of course
2002	Abandoned due to frost
2003	Abandoned due to waterlogged state of course
