= Mr Frisk =

British-bred Thoroughbred racehorse

- Sire: Bivouac
- Grandsire: Darius
- Dam: Jenny Frisk
- Damsire: Sunacelli
- Sex: Gelding
- Foaled: c. 1979
- Colour: Chestnut
- Breeder: Ralph Dalton
- Owner: Lois Duffey
- Trainer: Kim Bailey

Major wins
- Anthony Mildmay, Peter Cazalet Memorial Chase (1989); Grand National (1990); Whitbread Gold Cup (1990)
- Last updated on 12 April 2015

Mr Frisk (c.1979 – September 2000) was a Thoroughbred racehorse, which won the 1990 Grand National. He completed the course in record time of 8 minutes and 47.80 seconds, ridden by Marcus Armytage; this still stands, even though the race has been 342 yd (312.72 m) shorter since 2013. The pair also went on to win the Whitbread Gold Cup three weeks later - the only horse to achieve the double. The second placed horse in the National, Durham Edition, also filled the second place at Sandown.

After retirement from racing he continued as an eventer, trained by Tracey Bailey. He was put down in September 2000 after fracturing a hind leg.

== Grand National record ==
Grand National	Position	Jockey	Age	Weight	SP	Distance
1990	1st	Marcus Armytage	11	10-6	16/1	Won by ¾ length
1991	DNF	Marcus Armytage	12	11-6	25/1	Pulled up at fence 22 (Becher's Brook)
