= Charlie Cunningham (jockey) =

Scottish jockey (1849–1906)

Charles John Cunningham
Personal information
- Born: 21 December 1849 Morebattle Tofts, Kelso, Roxburghshire, Scotland
- Died: 20 October 1906 (aged 56) Muirhouselaw, Maxton, Roxburghshire, Scotland
- Occupation: Jockey

Horse racing career
- Sport: Horse racing

Major racing wins
- Scottish Grand National, National Hunt Chase Challenge Cup

Charles Cunningham (1849–1906) was a 19th-century Scottish National Hunt jockey, who has been described as "Scotland's greatest jockey".

Although he was an amateur throughout his career, he won the Scottish Grand National a record four times (1881, 1885, 1887 and 1889) and also the National Hunt Chase Challenge Cup in 1886. He is also one of only two jump jockeys to ride six winners in one day, a feat he achieved at Rugby Hunt on 29 March 1881. In one three-year period, he won 144 out of 276 races.

He was unnaturally big for a jockey, standing at 6 feet 1 inch tall and weighing over 12 stone

He had a serious fall in 1890, which contributed to his early death.

In addition to race-riding, he was also a keen cricketer, representing Northumberland in their pre-County cricket days, Dalkeith, Aberdeenshire and Roxburghshire
