= Jamie Codd =

Irish jockey

Personal information
- Born: 1981/1982 Mayglass, County Wexford, Ireland
- Occupation: Jockey

Horse racing career
- Sport: Horse racing

Racing awards
- Point to Point award winner in 2015 and 2020, Champion amateur jockey 2016-17

Significant horses
- Cause of Causes, Fayonagh, Shaneshill, The Big Dog

James John Codd (born 1981/1982) is an Irish jockey. Having won 972 races before retiring from point to points, he has the second highest number of wins in point to point races of any jockey.

== Racing career ==
Codd is a native of Mayglass, County Wexford. The son of trainer Billy Codd and the brother of the late point-to-point trainer Willie Codd, he was born into a horse racing family. He attended St Peter's College, Wexford, where he played Gaelic games for the school, as well as playing for St Fintan's at a club level.

=== Point to points ===
Codd started his racing career in 1999, riding in point-to-points for his father Billy. His first win in a point-to-point came two years later in 2001, when he rode Eyze to victory at Bramblestown for trainer Mags Mullins. He went on to become one of the most successful point-to-point jockeys in recent history, and by the time he retired from point riding in 2021, he had a total of 972 wins under his belt. He also became the only jockey this century to win all the races on one point-to-point card, winning all six races at Tinahely in 2011.

He was noted "the luckiest winner of a Point to Point" ever after winning at Borris on Rebel Benefit in 2014, after every other horse in the race made errors and did not complete.

=== Under rules ===
Codd won his first Grade One race in 2014, winning the Irish Champion Bumper at Punchestown on Shaneshill. As of 2021, Codd has a total of 299 wins under rules, including 32 class one wins and five Grade One wins.

In the 2016–17 season, Codd narrowly defeated Patrick Mullins to win the title of champion amateur jockey for the season.

Codd suffered a collapsed lung in 2018, which ruled him out of racing for a month.

==== Cheltenham wins ====
Codd has a total of ten wins at the Cheltenham Festival so far. He is the leading jockey since 1946 in the Fulke Walwyn Kim Muir Challenge Cup, having won the race on four runnings - his first Cheltenham win came in the 2009 running of the race on Character Building, then in 2012 on Junior, in 2015 on The Package and most recently in 2016 on Cause of Causes. Codd also partnered Cause of Causes to two more Cheltenham wins, winning in the 2015 National Hunt Chase Challenge Cup and scoring a third win with the horse in three festivals in the 2017 in the Glenfarclas Cross Country Chase. His other wins came in the National Hunt Chase in 2019 and 2020 on Le Breuil and Ravenhill respectively, and in the Champion Bumper, winning in 2017 with Fayonagh and again in 2019 with Envoi Allen. He later hailed Fayonagh as "the greatest horse [he] had ever ridden".

Codd notably missed the 2012 festival due to a fall sustained in a point to point race.

==== Grand National ====
Codd's first Grand National run came in 2017, when he rode his Cheltenham triple winner Cause of Causes to a second-place finish in the race, behind eventual winner One For Arthur, for trainer Gordon Elliott and owner J. P. McManus. He rode in the Grand National again in 2019 and 2021 on Mala Beach and Milan Native, but both horses pulled up before the finish.

== Personal life ==
Codd is married and has two children.

== Cheltenham Festival winners (10) ==
- Champion Bumper - (2) Fayonagh (2017), Envoi Allen (2019)
- Fulke Walwyn Kim Muir Challenge Cup - (4) Character Building (2009), Junior (2011), The Package (2015), Cause of Causes (2016)
- National Hunt Chase Challenge Cup - (3) Cause of Causes (2015), Le Breuil (2019), Ravenhill (2020)
- Glenfarclas Cross Country Chase - (1) Cause of Causes (2017)

== Major wins ==
(Republic of Ireland) Ireland

- Champion INH Flat Race - (3) Shaneshill (2014), Fayonagh (2017), Colreevy (2019)
