= Cause of Causes (horse) =

American-bred Thoroughbred racehorse

Cause Of Causes
- Racing Colours of John P McManus
- Sire: Dynaformer
- Dam: Angel In My Heart
- Damsire: Rainbow Quest
- Sex: Gelding
- Foaled: 17 February 2008
- Country: United States of America
- Colour: Bay
- Breeder: Flaxman Holdings Limited
- Owner: John P McManus
- Trainer: Gordon Elliott
- Record: 43:9,7,3
- Earnings: £569,061

Cause Of Causes (17 February 2008 – 19 April 2021) was an American-bred thoroughbred racehorse.

He was best known for three Cheltenham Festival victories.

== Career ==
Cause Of Causes was bred in the United States by Flaxman Holdings. He won his first and only race on the flat in 2011 in France.

In 2012, training was switched from France to Ireland with Gordon Elliott as the horse was sold to the Timeform Betfair Racing Club. Success followed with victories at Kilbeggan, Downpatrick, Navan and Ascot. Ultimately, Cause Of Causes was entered into the 2013 Supreme Novices Hurdle at the Cheltenham Festival, finishing 7th.

Following this, prolific owner J P McManus acquired the horse. The first run in his colours was at Roscommon Racecourse on 10 June 2013.

The first victory for new owner McManus came at the Cheltenham Festival in 2015, winning the National Hunt Chase Challenge Cup ridden by Jamie Codd. A month later, Cause Of Causes would finish 8th in the Grand National at Aintree.

After a lengthy break, Cause Of Causes won again at the 2016 Cheltenham Festival taking victory in the Fulke Walwyn Kim Muir Challenge Cup again with Codd as jockey.

A barren spell, including two races where he was pulled up would again follow. However, on return to Cheltenham in 2017, he would take his final race victory in the Glenfarclas Cross Country Chase. Cause Of Causes had another attempt at winning the Grand National at Aintree in the same year, finishing second to One For Arthur.

In 2018, Cause Of Causes would attempt to win another Cross Country Chase at Cheltenham but was pulled up. On 9 April 2018, Frank Berry who is McManus' racing manager confirmed he was retired due to injury.

Cause Of Causes died aged 13 of a heart attack at Martinstown Stud in Ireland.
