= Run and Skip =

National Hunt racehorse

Run and Skip was a National Hunt chaser who won the Welsh National in 1985 and was often ridden by Peter Scudamore. He was a regular in the Gold Cup and rated as high as 170 in the mid 1980s. He placed in many top chases including Whitbread, Cheltenham Gold Cup and Welsh Grand National. Fathered by Deep Run out of Skipperetta, he was trained by John Spearing.

Jockey Peter Scudamore described the horse, "I had the privilege of riding Run And Skip, who wasn't easy to train...Run And Skip proved that given the right ammunition he could do the job."
