= Linwell =

Irish-bred Thoroughbred racehorse

- Sire: Rosewell
- Grandsire: Orwell
- Dam: Rubia Linda
- Damsire: Arran Chief
- Sex: Gelding
- Foaled: 1948
- Country: Ireland
- Colour: Bay
- Breeder: James F. Delany
- Owner: David Brown
- Trainer: Ivor Herbert & Charlie Mallon

Major wins
- Mildmay Memorial Chase (1956); Cheltenham Gold Cup (1957)

Linwell (foaled 1948) was an Irish-bred, British-trained Thoroughbred racehorse who won the 1957 Cheltenham Gold Cup. Originally named Floral Tribute he was imported to England in 1953 and was trained by the journalist Ivor Herbert for the businessman David Brown. After beginning his career in point-to-point races he made rapid progress when switched to professional steeplechasing winning the Mildmay Memorial Chase in 1956 and the Gold Cup in the following year. In two subsequent attempts at the Gold Cup he had little luck: he unseated his jockey when hampered by a falling rival in 1958 and finished second in 1959 after being badly baulked and almost brought down at the final fence.

== Background ==
Linwell was a small bay gelding with a broad white blaze and two white socks, bred in Ireland by James F. Delany. He was sired by Rosewell, a British-bred horse who won the Irish Derby in 1938 and whose other offspring included the Champion Hurdle winner Distel. His dam Rubia Linda came from a family which produced several other good jumpers: her sister Miss Kilcash was the dam of the mare Kerstin who became one of Linwell's biggest rivals.

As a five-year-old he was bought for £750 from the County Tipperary-based horse-dealer Paddy Quinn, by Ivor Herbert on behalf of his friend and patron David Brown, the owner of Aston Martin. Herbert was a well-known racing journalist and the potential conflict of interest led to the racing authorities banning him from holding a trainer's licence: his horses were therefore officially trained by Charlie Mallon, the head of his stable staff ("head lad"). The gelding was originally named Floral Tribute but his name was changed after he moved to England.

== Racing career ==
=== Early career ===
Linwell began his career on the amateur point-to-point circuit and fell on his debut when he was ridden by Ivor Herbert. After the gelding showed some promise on his subsequent starts Herbert brought in the experienced professional jockey Michael Scudamore to school the horse and improve his jumping. Scudamore also rode the race when he was matched against professional opposition in the 1954/55 season and won three times in Novice steeplechases. In the following season he won five times, including wide margin victories at Newbury in December and Hurst Park in January and the Mildmay Memorial at Sandown Park. In the last-named race he was ridden by Rex Hamey, who received the winner's trophy from the Queen Mother.

=== 1956/57 National Hunt season ===
In late 1956 Linwell established himself as a leading Gold Cup contender with a win over Kerstin. In his final prep race for the Cheltenham race he was beaten by Pointsman in a race at Kempton Park Racecourse but ran well on a course which did not suit him. The 30th running of the Gold Cup, which took place on soft ground on 14 March 1957, looked to be a very open race with Kerstin and Pointsman being made the 6/1 joint favourites and Linwell, ridden as usual by Scudamore starting at 100/9. The other leading contenders in the thirteen-runner field were E.S.B., Sir Ken (a three-time winner of the Champion Hurdle), Gay Donald and Rose Park (King George VI Chase). Scudamore restrained Linwell towards the rear of the field as Rose Park set the pace before moving up to join the leaders approaching the straight. With Rose Park fading, the race appeared to lie between Linwell, Kerstin and Pointsman on the final turn. At the penultimate obstacle the mare made a bad mistake, badly hampering Pointman and handing the advantage to Linwell who jumped the last a length in front. Linwell stayed on strongly up the run-in to win by a length from Kerstin with Rose Park five lengths back in third.

=== Later career ===
In November 1957 Linwell carried top weight of 170 pounds in the inaugural running of the Hennessy Gold Cup at Newbury Racecourse. He finished second, beaten three lengths by the French-bred six-year-old Mandarin to whom he was conceding sixteen pounds. He also won twice and finished second on two other occasions that season. On 13 March Linwell started second favourite, behind Mandarin, as he attempted to win his second Gold Cup. Eight fences from the finish Mandarin fell, badly hampering Linwell who unseated Michael Scudamore. With the two leading contenders out of the contest, the race was won by Kerstin.

In December 1958 Linwell jumped poorly when beaten at odds of 1/8 in a chase at Windsor Racecourse. He made another attempt to win the Gold Cup in March 1959 and started the 11/2 third favourite behind Taxidermist and Roddy Owen. As the leaders approached the final fence the race appeared lie between Linwell (now ridden by Fred Winter), Pas Seul and Lochroe with Roddy Owen four lengths back in third. Pas Seul fell, badly obstructing Linwell who in turn hampered Lochroe, allowing Roddy Owen to sweep into the lead. Linwell rallied up the run-in but was unable to catch the leader and finished second, beaten three lengths.

== Assessment and honours ==
In their book, A Century of Champions, based on the Timeform rating system, John Randall and Tony Morris rated Linwell an "average" Gold Cup winner. He is remembered in the name of Linwell Close, a residential street in Cheltenham.

== Pedigree ==
Pedigree of Linwell (IRE), bay gelding, 1948
Sire Rosewell (GB) 1935	Orwell (GB); 1929	Gainsborough	Bayardo
Sire Rosewell (GB) 1935	Orwell (GB); 1929	Gainsborough	Rosedrop
Sire Rosewell (GB) 1935	Orwell (GB); 1929	Golden Hair	Golden Sun
Sire Rosewell (GB) 1935	Orwell (GB); 1929	Golden Hair	Tendril
Sire Rosewell (GB) 1935	Bower of Roses (GB); 1926	Roseland	William the Third
Sire Rosewell (GB) 1935	Bower of Roses (GB); 1926	Roseland	Electric Rose
Sire Rosewell (GB) 1935	Bower of Roses (GB); 1926	Glory	Stornoway
Sire Rosewell (GB) 1935	Bower of Roses (GB); 1926	Glory	Lass o' the Glen
Dam Rubia Linda (GB) 1936	Arran Chief (GB); 1924	Pomme-de-Terre	Polymelus
Dam Rubia Linda (GB) 1936	Arran Chief (GB); 1924	Pomme-de-Terre	Homestead
Dam Rubia Linda (GB) 1936	Arran Chief (GB); 1924	Corrie Invillie	Holiday House
Dam Rubia Linda (GB) 1936	Arran Chief (GB); 1924	Corrie Invillie	Waveline
Dam Rubia Linda (GB) 1936	Toy Fish (GB); 1926	Yutoi	Santoi
Dam Rubia Linda (GB) 1936	Toy Fish (GB); 1926	Yutoi	She
Dam Rubia Linda (GB) 1936	Toy Fish (GB); 1926	Candle Fish	Troutbeck
Dam Rubia Linda (GB) 1936	Toy Fish (GB); 1926	Candle Fish	Candelabra (Family: 17-b)
