= Carvill's Hill =

Irish thoroughbred racehorse

Carvill's Hill was an Irish thoroughbred racehorse. He had a memorable runaway win in the 1991 Welsh Grand National and twice won the Irish Gold Cup. He won 17 of 24 starts. He was trained for the final years of his career by Martin Pipe.

== Breeding ==
Carvill's Hill was born in 1982 by Roselier out of Suir Valley. At maturity he stood 17.2 hands.

== Career ==
Carvill's Hill was owned by Paul Green. His first race was in 1986 at Leopardstown. He was first trained by Jim Dreaper in Ireland and won 14 races, including the Irish Gold Cup at Leopardstown in 1989.

He was moved in 1991 to Martin Pipe's stables at Pond House for the rest of his racing career. Pipe was a "dominant force" in the Welsh Grand National at the time. In 1991 Carvill's Hill, jockeyed by Peter Scudamore, "demolished" the National, carrying top weight and finishing 20 lengths ahead going away in heavy going. Party Politics, which would win it the following year, came in second carrying 19 pounds less. It was Carvill's Hill's career-best performance and the best performance in the race's history, according to Timeform.

In 1992 Carvill's Hill again won the Irish Gold Cup.

Carvill's Hill was entered in the 1992 Cheltenham Gold Cup, again ridden by Scudamore, and started favourite. He had a very unhappy race after being constantly antagonised by Golden Freeze who was used as spoiling tactics to help Toby Tobias win the race for Jenny Pitman ,though she didn't achieve the end result as outsider Cool Ground won it, and, Carvills Hill finished a distressed last of five finishers. Afterwards it was found he had muscle pulls in his chest and back and had injured a tendon. It was his last race. Pipe worked with him for a further few years to turn him in to a hunter-chaser, but in 1996 decided to retire him.

Pipe called Carvill's Hill "the best horse I have ever trained. He won 17 of 24 starts.

== Retirement and death ==
Carvill's Hill was retired to become a hunter in 1996 and died in 2002.
