= JT McNamara =

Irish sportsman (1875–2016)

Personal information
- Born: 8 April 1975 Limerick, Ireland
- Died: 26 July 2016 (aged 41) Limerick, Ireland
- Occupation: Jockey
- Spouse: Caroline McNamara
- Children: 3

Horse racing career
- Sport: Horse racing
- Career wins: 600+

John Thomas McNamara (8 April 1975 – 26 July 2016) was an Irish amateur steeplechase jockey. He won over 600 racecourse victories during his career. He sustained a serious back injury and a broken neck after a fall at the 2013 Cheltenham Festival which left him paralysed and using a wheelchair.

== Biography ==
=== Career ===
As an amateur, McNamara rode over 600 point-to-point winners, breaking Enda Bolger's career record in 2006 before himself being overhauled by current record holder, Derek O'Connor some years later. Under rules, he carried home almost every major prize restricted to amateurs as well as many others open to professionals after forming a partnership with the Bolger yard.

In his native Ireland, McNamara was ever-present at the National Hunt Festival at Punchestown for the duration of his career. His haul included five La Touche Cups (2010 L'Ami, 2007, 2004 Spot Thedifference, 2005 Good Step, 2002 Risk Of Thunder), three Ladies Cups (2011, Outlaw Pete, 2006 Abrams Bridge, 2003 Buailtes and Fadas), three Bishopscourt Cups (2004, 2003 Ever Onward, 1998 Master Julian), two Champion Hunters' Chases (2012, 2010 On The Fringe) and the Grade 1 Champion NH Flat Race (2001, Like-A-Butterfly, run at Leopardstown).

McNamara was always in high demand for rides in the amateur races at the Cheltenham Festival. In 2002 he partnered Rith Dubh to victory in the Diamond Jubilee National Hunt Chase following a celebrated ride. He was successful in the 2005 Glenfarclas Cross Country Handicap Chase with Spot Thedifference and won the 2007 Foxhunter Chase on Drombeag. He secured his second National Hunt Chase in 2012 with Teaforthree.

=== Back injury and paralysis ===
The jockey, from Limerick, was badly hurt when Galaxy Rock, trained locally in Gloucestershire by Jonjo O'Neill, fell at the first fence in the 2013 Fulke Walwyn Kim Muir Challenge Cup. The fall fractured McNamara's C3 and C4 vertebrae. McNamara was flown to Frenchay Hospital in Bristol and was initially kept in an induced coma after recovering from neck surgery. He was the first jockey to have been paralysed on riding at a British racecourse since Wayne Burton suffered a serious head injury in a fall in Exeter in March 2008.

In June 2014, McNamara returned home to Ireland in a wheelchair 15 months after his fall at Cheltenham.

== Personal life ==
McNamara was married to Caroline and the couple had three children. McNamara lived in his country of birth, Ireland.

He suffered complications in July 2016 before being transferred to University Hospital Limerick and then discharged to spend his final days with his family. He died at his home on 26 July 2016 at the age of 41.
