= Gay Donald =

British-bred Thoroughbred racehorse

- Sire: Gay Light
- Grandsire: Flamboyant
- Dam: Pas de Quatre
- Damsire: Royal Dancer
- Sex: Gelding
- Foaled: 1946
- Country: United Kingdom
- Colour: Bay
- Owner: Philip Burt
- Trainer: Jim Ford

Major wins
- Cheltenham Gold Cup (1955)

Gay Donald (foaled 1946) was a British Thoroughbred racehorse who won the 1955 Cheltenham Gold Cup. Bred and trained in Wiltshire he made steady progress through the steeplechaseing ranks in the 1953/54 National Hunt season and developed into a top-class performer in the following year. He started a 33/1 outsider for the 1955 Gold Cup but won easily from a strong field. His later career was hampered by injury but he won several more races and finished third in the 1958 Gold Cup before being retired from racing at the age of thirteen.

== Background ==
Gay Donald was a bay gelding with no white markings bred in Wiltshire by Harry Frank. He was sired by Gay Light, a little-known stallion who stood cheaply in Gloucestershire. Gay Donald's dam Pas de Quatre was bred by Fred Darling who sold her for £40 to Frank in 1939. After an unsuccessful racing career Pas de Quatre became the only mare to produce two Cheltenham Gold Cup winners: her 1953 foal Pas Seul won the race in 1960. She was a distant female-line descendant of the influential British broodmare Little Sister. Gay Donald was foaled in a field at Frank's Wiltshire farm: he injured an eye at birth leaving him with a cloudy pupil throughout his life.

As a four-year-old in 1950 the gelding was bought by the trainer Jim Ford, acting on behalf of Philip Burt. Ford trained the horse at Yeovil before moving to the Park House stable at Cholderton. Gay Donald's idiosyncrasies included a fondness for Liquorice allsorts and sardine sandwiches.

== Racing career ==
Gay Donald showed promising form in the 1953/54 National Hunt season, winning at Wincanton Racecourse in October and then running well against top class opposition at Cheltenham. Later that season he won the Runnymede Handicap at Windsor Racecourse.

In the following season he made steady progress and developed into a Gold Cup contender, winning three of his first seven races and finishing second a chase at Lingfield Park when he attempted to concede eight pounds to Pointsman. The 28th running of the Cheltenham Gold Cup took place on 10 March 1955. The weather had been exceptionally harsh in the build-up to the race and the Cheltenham Festival was badly affected: the first day of the meeting was postponed and the Gold Cup was the only race from Thursday's original programme to survive. The 1954 winner Four Ten, who was expected to be well suited by the harsh conditions, started favourite ahead of Halloween whilst the other runners included Galloway Braes (third in 1952 and 1953) and Early Mist (winner of the 1953 Grand National). Gay Donald, ridden by Tony Grantham was an unconsidered outsider, starting at odds of 33/1. Gay Donald set off in front and soon built up a huge lead. He made bad jumping errors at the last two fences as he began to tire but never looked in any danger of defeat and won by ten lengths from Halloween, with Four Ten eight lengths back in third place.

In the years following his Gold Cup win, Gay Donald suffered from injury complications and struggled to recapture his best form. In 1957 Gay Donald attempted to win a second Gold Cup but made no impact in a race won by Linwell. His third run in the Gold Cup came in 1958 when he started at odds of 13/2 in a nine-runner field. He looked the likely winner on the second circuit but faded over the closing fences and finished third behind the mare Kerstin and the novice Polar Flight. The gelding showed some good form in the following year, beating the prolific winner Crudwell at Sandown Park in January. He continued to race until 1959 but recorded no more major wins.

== Assessment and honours ==
In their book, A Century of Champions, based on the Timeform rating system, John Randall and Tony Morris rated Gay Donald an "inferior" Gold Cup winner.

== Pedigree ==
Pedigree of Gay Donald (GB), bay gelding, 1946
Sire Gay Light (GB) 1926	Flamboyant (GB); 1918	Tracery	Rock Sand
Sire Gay Light (GB) 1926	Flamboyant (GB); 1918	Tracery	Topiary
Sire Gay Light (GB) 1926	Flamboyant (GB); 1918	Simonath	St Simon
Sire Gay Light (GB) 1926	Flamboyant (GB); 1918	Simonath	Philomath
Sire Gay Light (GB) 1926	Lone Star (GB); 1917	Swynford	John O'Gaunt
Sire Gay Light (GB) 1926	Lone Star (GB); 1917	Swynford	Canterbury Pilgrim
Sire Gay Light (GB) 1926	Lone Star (GB); 1917	Lady Vista	Sir Visto
Sire Gay Light (GB) 1926	Lone Star (GB); 1917	Lady Vista	Phroso
Dam Pas de Quatre (GB) 1938	Royal Dancer (IRE); 1929	Blandford	Swynford
Dam Pas de Quatre (GB) 1938	Royal Dancer (IRE); 1929	Blandford	Blanche
Dam Pas de Quatre (GB) 1938	Royal Dancer (IRE); 1929	Queen of the Ballet	Royal Realm
Dam Pas de Quatre (GB) 1938	Royal Dancer (IRE); 1929	Queen of the Ballet	Lady Lightfoot
Dam Pas de Quatre (GB) 1938	Baroness (FR); 1929	Weissdorn	Prunus
Dam Pas de Quatre (GB) 1938	Baroness (FR); 1929	Weissdorn	Wiener Madel
Dam Pas de Quatre (GB) 1938	Baroness (FR); 1929	American Beauty	Teddy
Dam Pas de Quatre (GB) 1938	Baroness (FR); 1929	American Beauty	Maillezais (Family: 8-i)
