= Roddy Owen =

British-bred Thoroughbred racehorse

- Sire: Owenstown
- Grandsire: Apron
- Dam: Deslas Star
- Damsire: Cygnus
- Sex: Gelding
- Foaled: 1949
- Country: United Kingdom
- Colour: Bay
- Owner: Lord Fingall
- Trainer: Danny Morgan

Major wins
- Leopardstown Chase (1958); Cheltenham Gold Cup (1959)

Roddy Owen (foaled 1949) was a British-bred, Irish-trained Thoroughbred racehorse who won the 1959 Cheltenham Gold Cup. After winning several good steeplechases in Ireland he was aimed at the major British races in the 1958/59 National Hunt season. He finished a close second in the King George VI Chase and then started second favourite for the Gold Cup in March. He relished the heavy ground came from a seemingly impossible position at the second last to defeat a strong field which included Linwell, Kerstin and Pas Seul. He finished fourth to Pas Seul in the following year's Gold Cup at the age of eleven.

== Background ==
Roddy Owen was a bay gelding bred in England, and exported to Ireland as an unbroken five-year-old. He was sired by Owenstown, a high-class stayer whose wins included the Irish St Leger and the Ebor Handicap. His dam Desla's Star was a distant descendant of the broodmare Gondola, a half-sister of the St Leger winner Gamester. During his racing career Roddy Owen was owned by Oliver Plunkett, 12th Earl of Fingall and was trained at Newbridge, County Kildare by Danny Morgan who had won the Gold Cup as a jockey on Morse Code in 1938. The horse was named after Captain Roderick Owen, an amateur jockey who won the 1892 Grand National.

== Racing career ==
=== Early career ===
Roddy Owen developed into a high class steeplechaser in Ireland, finishing third in the 1956 Irish Grand National and winning the Leopardstown Chase in 1958. He made his first appearance at the Cheltenham Festival in 1957 when he ran unsuccessfully under a weight of 167 pounds in the National Hunt Handicap Chase.

=== 1958/59 National Hunt season ===
After winning one of his first two starts of the 1958/59 season Roddy Owen was sent to England in December 1958 for the King George VI Chase at Kempton Park Racecourse. He appeared to be an unlucky loser, recovering from a bad mistake four fences from the finish and being beaten only a head by Lochroe. After a poor run at Leopardstown Racecourse on his next start Roddy Owen's regular jockey Bunny Cox voluntarily gave up the ride and recommended Bobby Beasley as a replacement. The 1959 Gold Cup was run on heavy ground on 6 March and attracted a field of eleven runners after the likely favourite Saffron Tartan was withdrawn on the morning of the race. Another notable absentee was the American Champion Neji who had sustained a leg injury a week earlier. Taxidermist, the winner of the Whitbread Gold Cup and the Hennessy Gold Cup was made the new favourite with Roddy Owen next in the betting on 5/1 whilst the other runners included Linwell, Kerstin and Lochroe. Beasley tracked the leaders but as the field approached the final fence he appeared to have no chance as he was four lengths adrift of the leading trio made up of Pas Seul, Linwell and Lochroe. The race changed completely at the last obstacle when Pas Seul fell, almost bringing down Linwell, who in turn collided with Lochroe. Roddy Owen, racing on the inside, was able to avoid the chaos and swept past Linwell and Lochroe to take the lead. Linwell made a recovery and reduced the deficit but Roddy Owen stayed on well to win by three lengths with Lochroe another ten lengths back in third place.

=== Later career ===
In the 1959/60 National Hunt season Roddy Owen was again aimed at the Gold Cup. After finishing second on his seasonal debut at Gowran Park in October he was beaten by Kerstin in the Imperial Leather Chase at Manchester Racecourse in December. He faced eleven opponents at Cheltenham on 10 March. He was still in contention when hampered by the fall of Kerstin at the last and finished fourth behind Pas Seul, Lochroe and Zonda. He stayed in training for the following season and finished third to Zonda at Leopardstown in November.

== Assessment and honours ==
In their book, A Century of Champions, based on the Timeform rating system, John Randall and Tony Morris rated Roddy Owen an "average" Gold Cup winner.

== Pedigree ==
Pedigree of Roddy Owen (GB), bay gelding, 1949
| Sire Owenstown (GB) 1934 | Apron (GB); 1920 | Son-in-Law | Dark Ronald |
| Sire Owenstown (GB) 1934 | Apron (GB); 1920 | Son-in-Law | Mother-in-Law |
| Sire Owenstown (GB) 1934 | Apron (GB); 1920 | Aprille | Chaucer* |
| Sire Owenstown (GB) 1934 | Apron (GB); 1920 | Aprille | Japonica |
| Sire Owenstown (GB) 1934 | Madame de Stael (IRE); 1923 | Chaucer* | St Simon* |
| Sire Owenstown (GB) 1934 | Madame de Stael (IRE); 1923 | Chaucer* | Canterbury Pilgrim* |
| Sire Owenstown (GB) 1934 | Madame de Stael (IRE); 1923 | Temoignage | The Tetrarch |
| Sire Owenstown (GB) 1934 | Madame de Stael (IRE); 1923 | Temoignage | Monaleen |
| Dam Desla's Choice (IRE) 1931 | Cygnus (IRE); 1916 | Sunstar | Sundridge |
| Dam Desla's Choice (IRE) 1931 | Cygnus (IRE); 1916 | Sunstar | Doris |
| Dam Desla's Choice (IRE) 1931 | Cygnus (IRE); 1916 | Mangalmi | William the Third* |
| Dam Desla's Choice (IRE) 1931 | Cygnus (IRE); 1916 | Mangalmi | Vampire |
| Dam Desla's Choice (IRE) 1931 | Desla (GB); 1914 | Desmond | St Simon* |
| Dam Desla's Choice (IRE) 1931 | Desla (GB); 1914 | Desmond | L'Abbesse de Jouarre |
| Dam Desla's Choice (IRE) 1931 | Desla (GB); 1914 | Lady Fowler | Wildfowler |
| Dam Desla's Choice (IRE) 1931 | Desla (GB); 1914 | Lady Fowler | Orxema (Family: 19-c) |

* Roddy Owen is inbred 4S x 3S to the stallion Chaucer, meaning that he appears fourth generation and third generation on the sire side of his pedigree.

* Roddy Owen is inbred 5S x 4S x 5D x 4D to the stallion St Simon, meaning that he appears fifth generation (via Chaucer) and fourth generation on the sire side of his pedigree, and fifth generation (via William the Third) and fourth generation on the dam side of his pedigree.
