= Raymond Mould =

English businessman (1940–2015)

- Born: Harold Raymond Mould; 8 December 1940
- Died: 13 September 2015 (aged 74); South of France
- Occupations: Businessman; Racehorse Owner
- Years active: 1970-2012
- Known for: Co-founder of Pillar Properties; Co-founder of Arlington Properties; Co-founder of London & Stamford
- Spouses: Jenny (m. 1964; died 2000); Caroline Wilson (m. 2004)
- Children: 2

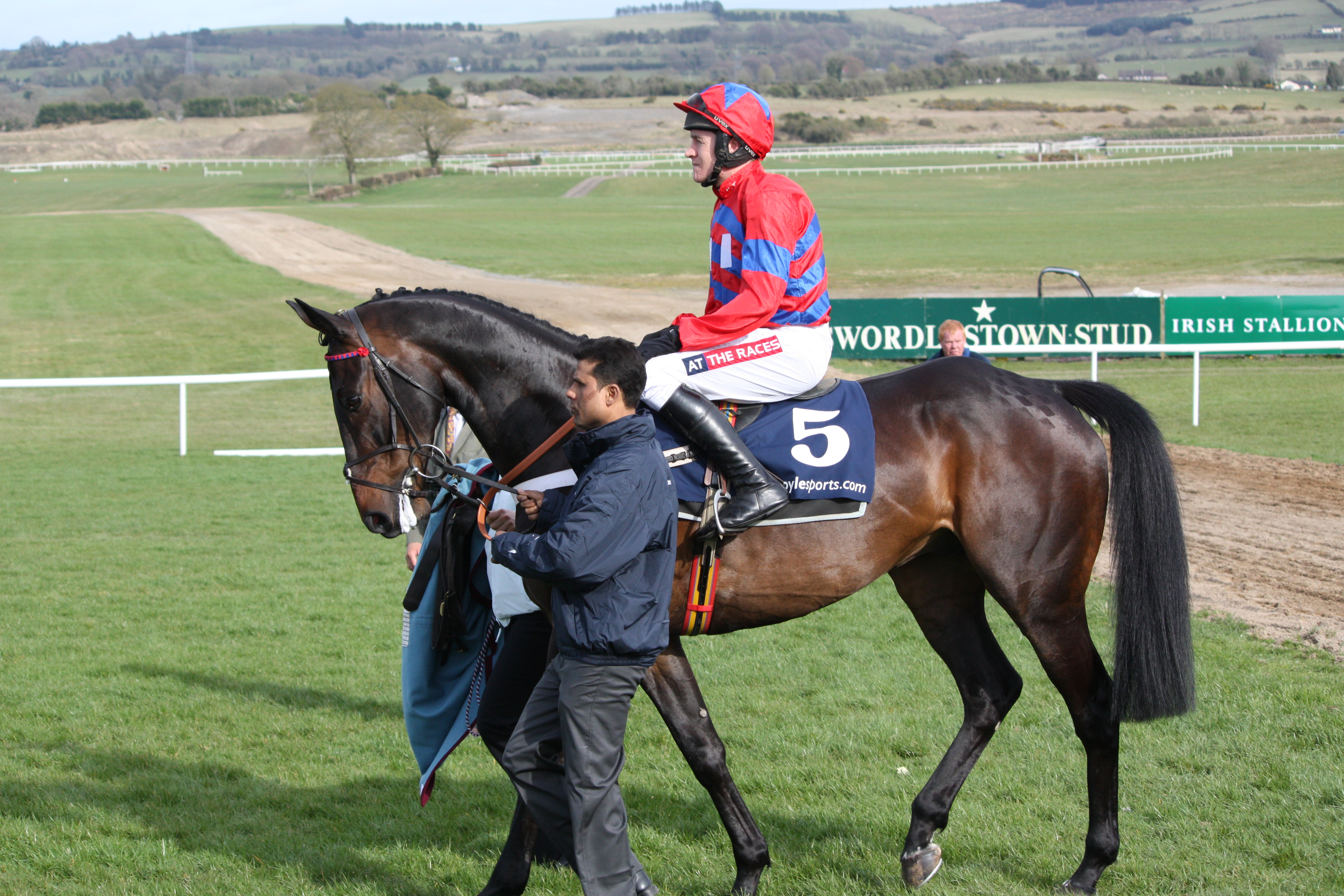
Sprinter Sacre in the colours of Mould's second wife, Caroline

Harold Raymond Mould (8 December 1940 – 13 September 2015) was an English businessman and successful racehorse owner.

== Business ==
In 1976 Mould founded Arlington Properties alongside business partner Patrick Vaughan. Arlington primarily focused on property developments around business parks. The company was successful, and listed on the stock exchange in 1986. In 1989, BAE purchased Arlington Properties for £289m, making Mould a millionaire. Mould continued to work for BAE after the takeover, however in the early 1990's he began Pillar Properties alongside Vaughan once again. Their focus was on the burgeoning market of retail parks. In 1994, Pillar Properties were stock listed with a value of £170m. In 2005, British Land, purchased Pillar Properties for £811m. The following year, Mould and Vaughan founded London & Stamford, which merged with the retail landlord Metric Property Investments in 2012 at which time Mould stood down from business.

== Horse racing ==
Mould was a well known racehorse owner, initially through his wife Jenny. Under her racing silks, green with white stars, the Moulds saw success in the 1988 Cheltenham Gold Cup with Charter Party and 1993 King George VI Chase winner Barton Bank. She topped the owners' standings for the 1992-93 season. He owned Grange Stud in Guiting Power, which bred flat horses including Notley, who won the 1991 Stewards' Cup at Goodwood. In 2002, Mould won the Grand National with Bindaree. Later, in the colours of second wife Caroline, owned Sprinter Sacre, who won ten successive chases between 2011 and 2013 including the 2013 Queen Mother Champion Chase.

== Personal life ==
Mould married first wife, Jenny, in 1964 and the pair remained together until her death in 2000. In 2004, Mould married Caroline Wilson, with whom he already had two children, in St Simon Zelotes Church, Knightsbridge. In 2010, his Cotswolds home was subject of a burglary where the Cheltenham Gold Cup was stolen. At the time, Mould had an estimated net worth of £60m

In 1996, Mould was part of a consortium including racing trainer Nigel Twiston-Davies, who bought the Hollow Bottom pub near Cheltenham. The pub is adorned with racing memorabilia. In 2001, the lease was sold.

Mould's funeral took place at Guiting Power village church of St Michael and All Angels, where he is buried.

In 2019, his youngest daughter Katie Wilson Mould married the rugby player Gavin Henson. They have two children.

He has another daughter called Samantha Wilson Mould.
