= Cool Ground =

Irish-bred Thoroughbred racehorse

- Racing silks of Whitcombe Manor Racing Stables Limited
- Sire: Over the River
- Grandsire: Luthier
- Dam: Merry Spring
- Damsire: Merrymount
- Sex: Gelding
- Foaled: 1982
- Country: Ireland
- Colour: Chestnut
- Breeder: N. J. Connors
- Owner: Peter Bolton / Whitcombe Manor Racing Stables Limited.
- Trainer: Toby Balding

Major wins
- Kim Muir Challenge Cup (1989); Welsh National (1990); Greenalls Gold Cup (1991); Cheltenham Gold Cup (1992)

Cool Ground is a former National Hunt racehorse. He won the Cheltenham Gold Cup in 1992, as well as the Kim Muir in 1989, the Anthony Mildmay, Peter Cazalet Memorial Chase in 1990 and 1991, the Welsh National in 1990, and the Greenalls Gold Cup (now called the Grand National Trial) in 1991. Adrian Maguire rode him in his Gold Cup win where he won by a short-head over The Fellow with Docklands Express back in a close third. His victory was a shock at 25/1 (he had been 40/1 earlier in the day). Toby Balding trained him to win the 1992 Cheltenham Gold Cup, and he was looked after by Kim Tierney. Cool Ground's only subsequent win was just over three years later in the Royal Artillery Gold Cup.
