= Fulke Walwyn Kim Muir Challenge Cup =

Steeplechase horse race in Britain

- Class: Ungraded
- Location: Cheltenham Racecourse; Cheltenham, England
- Inaugurated: 1946
- Race type: Chase
- Website: Cheltenham

Race information
- Distance: 3m 2f (5,230 metres)
- Surface: Turf
- Track: Left-handed
- Qualification: Five-years-old and up
- Weight: Handicap
- Purse: £75,000 (2023); 1st: £36,668

Fulke Walwyn Kim Muir Handicap Chase
2026
Ask Brewster	Road To Home	Monbeg Genius

Previous years
2025
Daily Present	Johnnywho	Sa Majeste
2024
Inothewayurthinkin	Git Maker	Whacker Clan
2023
Angels Dawn	Stumptown	Mr Incredible
2022
Chambard	Mister Coffey	Didero Vallis
2021
Mount Ida	Cloudy Glen	Shantou Flyer

2020–2011
2020
Milan Native	Kilfilum Cross	Bob Mahler
2019
Any Second Now	Kilfilum Cross	The Young Master
2018
Missed Approach	Mall Dini	Squouateur
2017
Domesday Book	Pendra	Premier Bond
2016
Cause of Causes	A Good Skin	Silvergrove
2015
The Package	Bless The Wings	Buddy Bolero
2014
Spring Heeled	Cause of Causes	Roberto Goldback
2013
Same Difference	Super Duty	Romanesco
2012
Sunnyhillboy	Becauseicouldntsee	Exmoor Ranger
2011
Junior	Faasel	Deal Done

2010–2001
2010
BallaBriggs	Faasel	Galant Nuit
2009
Character Building	Pretty Star	Newbay Prop
2008
High Chimes	Openide	Burntoakboy
2007
Cloudy Lane	Parsons Legacy	Cheeky Lady
2006
You're Special	Mon Mome	Undeniable
2005
Juveigneur	Lord of the River	Parsons Legacy
2004
Maximize	Merchants Friend	Ibis Rochelais
2003
Royal Predica	Ibis Rochelais	Rathbawn Prince
2002
The Bushkeeper	Ceanannas Mor	Cadougold

2000–1991
2000
Honey Mount	Marching Marquis	Supreme Charm
1999
Celtic Giant	Tell The Nipper	Orswell Lad
1998
In Truth	Cariboo Gold	Time for a Run
1997
King Lucifer	Time for a Run	Lucky Dollar
1996
Stop The Waller	Encore Un Peu	Run Up The Flag
1995
Flyer's Nap	Talbot	Camelot Knight
1994
Fighting Words	The Committee	Tri Folene
1993
Strong Beau	Merano	The Committee
1992
Tug of Gold	Paco's Boy	Latent Talent
1991
Omerta	Golden Minstrel	Master Bob

1990–1988
1990
Master Bob	Golden Minstrel	Dudie
1989
Cool Ground	Charter Hardware	Team Challenge
1988
Golden Minstrel	Cats Eyes	Whitsunday

The Fulke Walwyn Kim Muir Challenge Cup is a National Hunt steeplechase in Great Britain for amateur riders; it is open to horses aged five years or older. The chase is run on the New Course at Cheltenham, over a distance of about 3 miles and 2 furlongs (5,230 metres) and, during its running, there are twenty-one fences to be jumped. It is a handicap race and it is scheduled to take place each year during the Cheltenham Festival in March.

The event was established in 1946 and it was originally called the Kim Muir Amateur Riders' Steeplechase. It was introduced by Mrs Evan Williams and was named in memory of her brother, Kim Muir, a cavalry officer who lost his life during World War II. The name of Fulke Walwyn was added to the title in 1991. This was in honour of the highly successful trainer, whose 211 victories at Cheltenham included 40 at the Festival.

Only professional jockeys competed in the 2021 running as amateur riders were excluded from the Cheltenham Festival due to restrictions on grassroots sport for the COVID-19 pandemic in the United Kingdom.

== Records ==
Most successful horse (2 wins):

- Chu-Teh – 1967, 1968
- Glyde Court – 1985, 1986

Leading jockey (4 wins):

- Jamie Codd – Character Building (2009), Junior (2011), The Package (2015), Cause of Causes (2016)

Leading trainer (4 wins):

- Fred Rimell – Mighty Fine (1951), Gay Monarch II (1955), Nicolaus Silver (1961), Double Negative (1977)

== Winners ==
- Weights given in stones and pounds; All amateur jockeys except in 2021.

Year	Winner	Age	Weight	Jockey	Trainer
1946	Astrometer	8	10–13	Denis Baggallay	Charles Rogers
	no race 1947 (Note: The 1947 running was abandoned due to snow and frost)
1948	Double Bridge	7	10-10	John Gale	Bay Powell
1949	Jack Tatters	11	12-02	Lord Mildmay	Fulke Walwyn
1950	Morning Cover	9	10-10	Tubby Parker	Gerry Wilson
1951	Mighty Fine	9	11-11	Peter Chisman	Fred Rimell
1952	Menzies	10	10–11	Peter Chisman	Syd Mercer
1953	Crudwell	7	11-11	Atty Corbett	Frank Cundell
1954	Arctic Gold	9	12-03	Ted Greenway	Gerald Balding Sr.
1955	Gay Monarch II	9	11-03	Rupert Watson	Fred Rimell
1956	Filon d'Or	9	10-10	Danny Moralee	Horace Cousins
1957	Mighty Apollo	8	10–13	Bobby Brewis	David Machin
1958	Lochroe	10	12-02	Edward Cazalet	Peter Cazalet
1959	Irish Coffee	9	10–13	Gay Kindersley	Charlie McCartan
1960	Solray	6	11-03	Nick Upton	F. Cliffe
1961	Nicolaus Silver	9	10-05	Bill Tellwright	Fred Rimell
1962	Carrickbeg	6	09-12	Giles Pitman	Don Butchers
1963	Centre Circle	8	10–12	Basil Ancil	Derek Ancil
1964	Jim's Tavern	7	10-04	Giles Pitman	John Hicks
1965	Burton Tan	10	11-03	Robin Collie	Robin Collie
1966	Jimmy Scot	10	10-09	John Lawrence	Fulke Walwyn
1967	Chu-Teh	8	10-08	Nick Gaselee	Ken Cundell
1968	Chu-Teh	9	10-06	David Crossley-Cooke	Ken Cundell
1969	Pride of Kentucky	7	10-04	Roger Charlton	Edward Courage
1970	Rainbow Valley	7	10–12	Michael Dickinson	Tony Dickinson
1971	Black Baize	6	10-06	John Lawrence	Bill Shand Kydd
1972	The Ghost	7	11-11	John Mead	Vernon Cross
1973	Hinterland	7	10-07	Bill Foulkes	Tim Forster
1974	Castleruddery	8	10-05	Ted Walsh	Peter McCreery
1975	Quick Reply	10	11-01	Ridley Lamb	Harry Bell
1976	Prolan	7	11-07	Ted Walsh	Edward O'Grady
1977	Double Negative	7	10-09	Peter Brookshaw	Fred Rimell
	no race 1978 (Note: The 1978 edition was cancelled because of snow)
1979	Redundant Punter	9	09-12	D. Jackson	Tim Forster
1980	Good Prospect	11	10–12	Jim Wilson	John Edwards
1981	Waggoners Walk	12	10-03	Chris Cundall	Caroline Mason
1982	Political Pop	8	12-00	Dermot Browne	Michael Dickinson
1983	Greasepaint	8	11-05	Colin Magnier	Michael Cunningham
1984	Broomy Bank	9	11-04	Jim Wilson	John Edwards
1985	Glyde Court	8	10-05	Simon Sherwood	Fred Winter
1986	Glyde Court	9	11-00	John Queally	Fred Winter
1987	The Ellier	11	10-05	Gee Armytage	Nigel Tinkler
1988	Golden Minstrel	9	11-01	Tom Grantham	Josh Gifford
1989	Cool Ground	7	10-00	Anthony Tory	Richard Mitchell
1990	Master Bob	10	10-01	John Berry	Nicky Henderson
1991	Omerta	11	09-13	Adrian Maguire	Martin Pipe
1992	Tug of Gold	7	10-02	Marcus Armytage	David Nicholson
1993	Strong Beau	8	09-08	Tom Jenks	David Nicholson
1994	Fighting Words	8	10-00	Tim McCarthy	Josh Gifford
1995	Flyer's Nap	9	09-10	Peter Henley	Robert Alner
1996	Stop the Waller	7	09-11	Ken Whelan	Ferdy Murphy
1997	King Lucifer	8	11-05	Robert Thornton	David Nicholson
1998	In Truth	10	09-09	Seamus Durack	Steve Gollings
1999	Celtic Giant	9	10-00	Bruce Gibson	Len Lungo
2000	Honey Mount	9	09-12	Robert Walford	Robert Alner
	no race 2001 (Note: It was abandoned because of the 2001 United Kingdom foot-and-mouth crisis)
2002	The Bushkeeper	8	11-02	David Crosse	Nicky Henderson
2003	Royal Predica	9	10–13	Saul McHugh	Martin Pipe
2004	Maximise	10	10-06	Darren Edwards	Martin Pipe
2005	Juveigneur	8	11-07	Richard Burton	Nicky Henderson
2006	You're Special	9	10–12	Richard Harding	Ferdy Murphy
2007	Cloudy Lane	7	10–11	Richard Burton	Donald McCain, Jr.
2008	High Chimes	9	10-10	James Tudor	Evan Williams
2009	Character Building	9	11–12	Jamie Codd	John Quinn
2010	Ballabriggs	9	11–12	Richard Harding	Donald McCain, Jr.
2011	Junior	8	11-06	Jamie Codd	David Pipe
2012	Sunnyhillboy	9	11-11	Alan Berry	Jonjo O'Neill
2013	Same Difference	7	11-07	Ryan Hatch	Nigel Twiston-Davies
2014	Spring Heeled	7	11-06	Robbie McNamara	Jim Culloty
2015	The Package	12	11-04	Jamie Codd	David Pipe
2016	Cause of Causes	8	11-09	Jamie Codd	Gordon Elliott
2017	Domesday Book	7	11-04	Gina Andrews	Stuart Edmunds
2018	Missed Approach	8	11-05	Noel McParlan	Warren Greatrex
2019	Any Second Now	7	11-11	Derek O'Connor	Ted Walsh
2020	Milan Native	7	11-08	Rob James	Gordon Elliott
2021	Mount Ida	7	11-09	Jack Kennedy	Denise Foster
2022	Chambard	10	10-12	Lucy Turner	Venetia Williams
2023	Angels Dawn	8	11-00	Pa King	Sam Curling
2024	Inothewayurthinkin	6	12-00	Derek O'Connor	Gavin Cromwell
2025	Daily Present	8	11-00	Barry Stone	Paul Nolan
2026	Ask Brewster	7	10-11	Shane Cotter	Cath Williams

== See also ==
- Horse racing in Great Britain
- List of British National Hunt races
- Recurring sporting events established in 1946 – this race is included under its original title, Kim Muir Amateur Riders' Steeplechase.
