= Fegentri =

- Founded: 1955

Fegentri stands for International Federation of Gentlemen and Lady Riders or, in French, Fédération Internationale des Gentlemen-Riders et des Cavalières. It was founded in 1955 . The founding members were France, Germany, Italy, Sweden and Switzerland. Many nations have joined Fegentri since 1955 and today the membership consists of 25 countries.

== Notable members ==
- Nathalie Bélinguier (Présidente)
- Thierry Lohest (Vice-Président)
