= Burrough Hill Lad =

British Thoroughbred racehorse

- Burrough Hill Lad at Sandown Park ridden by John Francome
- Sire: Richboy
- Grandsire: Princely Gift
- Dam: Green Monkey
- Damsire: Court Harwell
- Sex: Gelding
- Foaled: 1976
- Country: Great Britain
- Colour: Brown
- Breeder: Stan Riley
- Owner: Stan Riley
- Trainer: W Wharton and Jenny Pitman
- Record: 27: 17-2-3 (Steeplechases)

Major wins
- Mildmay Novices' Chase (1982); Welsh National (1983); Anthony Mildmay, Peter Cazalet Memorial Chase (1984); Gainsborough Chase (1984, 1985, 1986); Cheltenham Gold Cup (1984); Charlie Hall Chase (1984); Hennessy Gold Cup (1984); King George VI Chase (1984)

Awards
- Timeform Champion Jumper (1984/1985); Timeform rating: 184

Burrough Hill Lad (1976–2004) was a British Thoroughbred racehorse. Named after Leicestershire village Burrough-On-The-Hill, he competed in National Hunt races and won seventeen times from twenty-seven runs in steeplechases. His performances in 1984, when he won the Cheltenham Gold Cup, Hennessy Gold Cup and King George VI Chase saw him rated one of the best horses in the history of the sport.

== Background ==
Burrough Hill Lad was a big, powerfully built brown gelding, bred by his owner, Stan Riley. He was sired by Richboy out of the mare Green Monkey. He was trained by Jimmy Harris initially and then Walter Wharton, before moving to Jenny Pitman at Lambourn in Berkshire.

== Racing career ==
Burrough Hill Lad recorded his first important win when he took the Mildmay Novices' Chase as a six-year-old in April 1982.

In the 1983/1984 National Hunt season, he established himself as a contender for the Cheltenham Gold Cup when he won the Welsh National at Chepstow Racecourse in December. In March he started at odds of 7/2 for the Gold Cup and won by three lengths from Brown Chamberlin. He was ridden by Phil Tuck as his regular jockey, John Francome, had been claimed to ride Brown Chamberlin.

Burrough Hill Lad produced his best form in the autumn of 1984. After winning a warm-up race at Wincanton Racecourse, he carried a weight of 168 pounds in the Hennessy Gold Cup. In what has been described as one of the great weight-carrying performances, he survived a bad mistake at the seventh-last fence to win by four lengths from RSA Chase winner Canny Danny, who was carrying 147 pounds. He then won the Charlie Hall Chase at Wetherby Racecourse, beating Wayward Lad by ten lengths. He then took the weight-for-age King George VI Chase at Kempton Park on Boxing Day, narrowly defeating Combs Ditch over a course and distance which Francome felt was unsuitable for the horse. He sustained an injury in early 1985 which prevented him from defending the Gold Cup.

Burrough Hill Lad returned in February 1986 with a win in the Gainsborough Chase, but a leg injury ended his season shortly afterwards. The gelding was expected to return in the 1987 Gold Cup, but Pitman was unable to get him fully fit and withdrew him from the race.

In March 1988, Burrough Hill Lad pulled up lame after a training gallop and was retired.

== Assessment ==
Timeform gave Burrough Hill Lad a peak rating of 184, the seventh highest ever awarded to a steeplechaser.

In their book A Century of Champions, based on the Timeform rating system, John Randall and Tony Morris ranked Burrough Hill Lad as the ninth-best steeplechaser of the 20th century.

Pitman described Burrough Hill Lad at his peak as resembling "a Rolls-Royce against stock cars".

== Retirement ==
Burrough Hill Lad spent his retirement at Frickley in Yorkshire. He died in January 2004 at the age of twenty-eight.

== Pedigree ==
Pedigree of Burrough Hill Lad (GB), brown gelding, 1976
Sire Richboy (GB) 1967	Princely Gift; 1951	Nasrullah	Nearco
Sire Richboy (GB) 1967	Princely Gift; 1951	Nasrullah	Mumtaz Begum
Sire Richboy (GB) 1967	Princely Gift; 1951	Blue Gem	Blue Peter
Sire Richboy (GB) 1967	Princely Gift; 1951	Blue Gem	Sparkle
Sire Richboy (GB) 1967	Riches; 1962	High Top	Hyperion*
Sire Richboy (GB) 1967	Riches; 1962	High Top	Rockfel
Sire Richboy (GB) 1967	Riches; 1962	Rockefella	Majano
Sire Richboy (GB) 1967	Riches; 1962	Rockefella	Chanterelle
Dam Green Monkey (GB) 1962	Court Harwell; 1954	Chambiges	Prince Rose
Dam Green Monkey (GB) 1962	Court Harwell; 1954	Chambiges	Chevalerie
Dam Green Monkey (GB) 1962	Court Harwell; 1954	Prince Chevalier	Hyperion*
Dam Green Monkey (GB) 1962	Court Harwell; 1954	Prince Chevalier	Participation
Dam Green Monkey (GB) 1962	Right Monkey; 1950	Holywell	Blandford
Dam Green Monkey (GB) 1962	Right Monkey; 1950	Holywell	Double Life
Dam Green Monkey (GB) 1962	Right Monkey; 1950	Leighvino	Buckleigh
Dam Green Monkey (GB) 1962	Right Monkey; 1950	Leighvino	Ebb Tide (Family: 9-e)

- Burrough Hill Lad was inbred 4x4 to Hyperion, meaning that this stallion appears twice in the fourth generation of his pedigree.
