= Welsh Grand National =

Steeplechase horse race in Britain

Coral Welsh Grand National
- Class: Premier Handicap
- Location: Chepstow Racecourse; Chepstow, Wales
- Inaugurated: 1895
- Race type: Chase
- Sponsor: Coral
- Website: Chepstow

Race information
- Distance: 3m 6½f (6,154 metres)
- Surface: Turf
- Track: Left-handed
- Qualification: Four-years-old and up
- Weight: Handicap
- Purse: £170,000 (2025); 1st: £96,815

Welsh Grand National
2025
Haiti Couleurs	O'Connell	Deafening Silence

Previous years
2024
Val Dancer	Jubilee Express	Iwilldoit
2023
Nassalam	Iron Bridge	Iwilldoit
2022
The Two Amigos	The Big Breakaway	The Big Dog
2021
Iwilldoit	Highland Hunter	Truckers Lodge

2020-2011
2020
Secret Reprieve	The Two Amigos	Yala Enki
2019
Potters Corner	Truckers Lodge	Yala Enki
2018
Elegant Escape	Ramses De Teillee	Yala Enki
2017
Raz De Maree	Alfie Spinner	Final Nudge
2016
Native River	Raz De Maree	Houblon Des Obeaux
2015
Mountainous	Firebird Flyer	Shotgun Paddy
2014
Emperor's Choice	Benvolio	Glenquest
2013
Mountainous	Hawkes Point	Tidal Bay
2012
Monbeg Dude	Teaforthree	Triggerman
2011
Le Beau Bai	Giles Cross	Cappa Bleu
2011
Synchronised	Giles Cross	I'moncloudnine

2010-2001
2009
Dream Alliance	Silver By Nature	Le Beau Bai
2008
Notre Pere	Cornish Sett	Halcon Genelardais
2007
Miko de Beauchene	Halcon Genelardais	Over The Creek
2006
Halcon Genelardais	Mon Mome	Juveigneur
2005
L'aventure	Heros Collonges	Cornish Rebel
2004
Silver Birch	Strong Resolve	Chives
2003
Bindaree	Sir Rembrandt	Hedgehunter
2002
Mini Sensation	Chives	Gunner Welburn
2001
Supreme Glory	Jocks Cross	Bindaree

2000-1991
2000
Jocks Cross	Moral Support	Edmond
1999
Edmond	Forest Ivory	Earthmover
1998
Kendal Cavalier	Fiddling The Facts	Forest Ivory
1997
Earth Summit	Dom Samourai	Samlee
1994
Master Oats	Earth Summit	Party Politics
1993
Riverside Boy	Fiddlers Pike	Cool Ground
1992
Run For Free	Riverside Boy	Miinnehoma
1991
Carvill's Hill	Party Politics	Aquilifer

1990-1987
1990
Cool Ground	Carrick Hill Lad	Rowlandsons Jewels
1989
Bonanza Boy	Cool Ground	Charter Hardware
1988
Bonanza Boy	Run And Skip	The Thinker
1987
Playschool	Rhyme 'N' Reason	Midnight Madness

The Coral Welsh Grand National is a Premier Handicap National Hunt steeplechase in Great Britain which is open to horses aged four years or older. It is run at Chepstow, Wales, over a distance of about 3 miles and 6½ furlongs (3 miles 6 furlongs and 130 yards, or 6,154 metres), and during its running there are twenty-three fences to be jumped. It is a handicap race, and it is scheduled to take place each year on 27 December.

The race was first run in 1895, and it originally took place at Ely Racecourse in Cardiff. It remained at this venue until the closure of the course in 1939. After World War II it was transferred to Newport Racecourse in 1948, and it was then moved to its present venue in 1949. Dick Francis, the famous jockey turned author, rode the first Chepstow winner of the race, Fighting Line. David Nicholson, later a successful racehorse trainer, rode three successive Welsh National winners in 1959, 1960 and 1961.

Originally run on Easter Tuesday, it was moved to February in 1969 with the aim of attracting better horses, albeit with the increased risk of bad weather forcing its cancellation. It has been sponsored by bookmakers Coral from 1973 and is now the longest running sponsorship in jump racing. The race was given Grade 3 status when the National Hunt Pattern was revised in 1989 and was re-classified as a Premier Handicap from the 2022 running when Grade 3 status was renamed by the British Horseracing Authority.

It was moved to late December in 1979, after that year's original fixture was abandoned due to snow. The meeting is now held the day after Boxing Day and since then the class of runners has improved further, making it an informative guide to future races such as the Grand National and the Cheltenham Gold Cup. The race distance was extended from 3 miles 5 furlongs and 110 yards to its present distance in 2019, to allow a longer run to the first bend; this also meant that field now jumps 23 fences rather than the previous 22.

Among the winners were Burrough Hill Lad in 1983, who went on to land the Tote Cheltenham Gold Cup less than three months later. Trainer Jenny Pitman had the previous season saddled Corbière to win the Welsh and Aintree Nationals. In the late 80s and early 90s, the race was dominated by Somerset trainer Martin Pipe. Bonanza Boy achieved consecutive successes in 1988 and 1989, and in 1991 the giant Carvill's Hill became one of the easiest winners in the history of the race.

More recent winners of both the Welsh and the Aintree Grand National are Bindaree and Silver Birch. The 2010 winner, Synchronised, went on to win the 2012 Cheltenham Gold Cup. The 2016 winner Native River, ridden by champion jockey Richard Johnson, went on to win the 2018 Cheltenham Gold Cup.

The race will be worth £170,000 in prize money in 2025.

== Winners since 1948 ==
- Weights given in stones and pounds.

Year	Winner	Age	Weight	Jockey	Trainer
1948	Bora's Cottage	10	10-02	Eddie Reavey	Ryan Price
1949	Fighting Line	10	10-09	Dick Francis	Ken Cundell
1950	Gallery	12	10-08	Alf Mullins	William "Rip" Bissill
1951	Skyreholme	8	10-13	Arthur Thompson	Neville Crump
1952	Dinton Lass	10	10-00	Alf Mullins	John Roberts
1953	Stalbridge Rock	10	11-03	Bob McCreery	Harry Dufosee
1954	Blow Horn	10	10-06	John Hunter	T Jarvis
1955	Monaleen	10	09-07	Paddy Fitzgerald	H T Smith
1956	Crudwell	10	11-06	Dick Francis	Frank Cundell
1957	Creeola II	9	10-05	Michael Scudamore	Fred Rimell
1958	Oscar Wilde	8	09-13	Brian Lawrence	Bill Wightman
1959	Limonali	8	10-02	David Nicholson	Edward Morel
1960	Clover Bud	10	10-10	David Nicholson	G Llewellin
1961	Limonali	10	11-12	David Nicholson	I Lewis
1962	Forty Secrets	8	10-11	Josh Gifford	Earl Jones
1963	Motel	9	10-06	Paddy Cowley	W Lowe
1964	Rainbow Battle	8	10-00	Paddy Broderick	Arthur Stephenson
1965	Norther	8	11-00	Terry Biddlecombe	Denzil Jenkins
1966	Kilburn	8	11-02	Tim Norman	Chris Nesfield
1967	Happy Spring	11	10-04	Ken White	Stan Wright
1968	Glenn	7	10-04	Eddie Harty	Fred Rimell
1969	Abandoned due to snow
1970	French Excuse	8	10-09	Terry Biddlecombe	Fred Rimell
1971	Royal Toss	9	10-12	Paddy Cowley	Tim Handel
1972	Charlie H	10	11-03	Johnny Haine	Bob Turnell
1973	Deblin's Green	10	09-12	Nigel Wakley	George Yardley
1974	Pattered	8	10-02	Ken White	Earl Jones
1975	Abandoned due to waterlogging
1976	Rag Trade	10	11-02	John Burke	Fred Rimell
1977	Abandoned due to waterlogging
1978	Abandoned due to snow
1979	Peter Scot	8	10-02	Paul Barton	David Gandolfo
1980	Narvik	7	10-11	John Francome	Neville Crump
1981	Peaty Sandy	7	10-03	Geordie Dun (Note: amateur jockey)	Helen Hamilton
1982	Corbiere	7	10-10	Ben de Haan	Jenny Pitman
1983	Burrough Hill Lad	7	10-09	John Francome	Jenny Pitman
1984	Righthand Man	7	11-05	Graham Bradley	Monica Dickinson
1985	Run and Skip	7	10-08	Peter Scudamore	John Spearing
1986	Stearsby	7	11-05	Graham Bradley	Jenny Pitman
1987	Playschool	10	10-11	Paul Nicholls	David Barons
1988	Bonanza Boy	7	10-01	Peter Scudamore	Martin Pipe
1989	Bonanza Boy	8	11-11	Peter Scudamore	Martin Pipe
1990	Cool Ground	8	10-00	Luke Harvey	Reg Akehurst
1991	Carvill's Hill	9	11-12	Peter Scudamore	Martin Pipe
1992	Run for Free	8	10-09	Mark Perrett	Martin Pipe
1993	Riverside Boy	10	10-00	Richard Dunwoody	Martin Pipe
1994 (Note: The 1994 running took place at Newbury)	Master Oats	8	11-06	Norman Williamson	Kim Bailey
1995	Abandoned due to frost
1996	Abandoned due to frost
1997	Earth Summit	9	10-13	Tom Jenks	Nigel Twiston-Davies
1998	Kendal Cavalier	8	10-00	Barry Fenton	Nigel Hawke
1999	Edmond	7	10-00	Richard Johnson	Henry Daly
2000	Jocks Cross	9	10-04	Brian Crowley	Venetia Williams
2001	Supreme Glory	8	10-00	Leighton Aspell	Pat Murphy
2002	Mini Sensation	9	10-04	Tony Dobbin	Jonjo O'Neill
2003	Bindaree	9	10-09	Carl Llewellyn	Nigel Twiston-Davies
2004	Silver Birch	7	10-05	Ruby Walsh	Paul Nicholls
2005	L'Aventure	6	10-04	Leighton Aspell	Paul Nicholls
2006	Halcon Genelardais	6	11-03	Wayne Hutchinson	Alan King
2007	Miko de Beauchene	7	10-05	Andrew Thornton	Robert Alner
2008	Notre Pere	7	11-00	Andrew Lynch	Jim Dreaper
2009	Dream Alliance	8	10-08	Tom O'Brien	Philip Hobbs
2010 (Note: The "2010" running took place in January 2011 after the original fixture was postponed because of snow and frost)	Synchronised	8	11-06	Tony McCoy	Jonjo O'Neill
2011	Le Beau Bai	8	10-01	Charlie Poste	Richard Lee
2012 (Note: The "2012" running took place in January 2013 after the original fixture was postponed because of waterlogging)	Monbeg Dude	8	10-01	Paul Carberry	Michael Scudamore
2013	Mountainous	8	10-00	Paul Moloney	Richard Lee
2014	Emperor's Choice	7	10-08	Aidan Coleman	Venetia Williams
2015 (Note: The "2015" running took place in January 2016 after the original fixture was postponed because of waterlogging)	Mountainous	11	10-06	Jamie Moore	Kerry Lee
2016	Native River	6	11-12	Richard Johnson	Colin Tizzard
2017 (Note: The "2017" running took place in January 2018 after the original fixture was postponed because of waterlogging)	Raz De Maree	13	10-10	James Bowen	Gavin Cromwell
2018	Elegant Escape	6	11-08	Tom O'Brien	Colin Tizzard
2019	Potters Corner	9	10-04	Jack Tudor	Christian Williams
2020 (Note: The "2020" running took place in January 2021 after the original fixture was postponed because of waterlogging)	Secret Reprieve	7	10-01	Adam Wedge	Evan Williams
2021	Iwilldoit	8	10-00	Stan Sheppard	Sam Thomas
2022	The Two Amigos	10	10-01	David Prichard	Nicky Martin
2023	Nassalam	6	11-03	Caoilin Quinn	Gary Moore
2024	Val Dancer	7	10-06	Charlie Hammond	Mel Rowley
2025	Haiti Couleurs	8	11-13	Sean Bowen	Rebecca Curtis

== See also ==
- Scottish Grand National
- Ulster Grand Naitonal
- Irish Grand National
- Horseracing in Great Britain
- List of British National Hunt races
