= Vyta Du Roc =

French-bred racehorse

- Sire: Lion Noir
- Dam: Dolce Vyta
- Damsire: Grand Tresor
- Sex: Gelding
- Foaled: 21 June 2009
- Country: France
- Colour: Grey
- Breeder: André Le Gall
- Owner: Louis Baudron; Simon Munir and Isaac Souede
- Trainer: M-L Mortier; Nicky Henderson; Gordon Elliott (racehorse trainer)
- Record: 27: 7-4-2
- Earnings: £176,514

Major wins
- Reynoldstown Novices' Chase (2016)

Vyta Du Roc (foaled 21 June 2009) was a grey AQPS racehorse. He was bred in France and trained in Great Britain and Ireland. His most noted success came when winning the 2016 Reynoldstown Novices' Chase.

== Racing career ==
Vyta Du Roc was bred in France by André Le Gall. He ran twice over hurdles in France in 2013, being placed 3rd in the second race, before joining the yard of trainer Nicky Henderson at Lambourn in England. He was bought by financiers Simon Munir and Isaac Souede (chairman of Permal Group). He won his first four starts in Great Britain, including two Grade 2 novice hurdle races (the Sharp Novices' Hurdle at Cheltenham and the Winter Novices' Hurdle at Sandown Park) before, on 29 December 2014, coming a close second in the Grade 1 Challow Novices' Hurdle at Newbury. In these races he was ridden by David Bass, Tony McCoy and Barry Geraghty. In March 2015, Vyta Du Roc made the first of three appearances at the Cheltenham Festival, coming fourth in the Baring Bingham Novices' Hurdle. At Aintree in April 2015, ridden by Daryl Jacob for the first time, he came second to Thistlecrack in the Grade 1 Sefton Novices' Hurdle and achieved a career-high rating of 150.

The 2015/2016 season saw Vyta Du Roc entered in three novice chases. He won as odds-on favourite at Bangor, came second as favourite at Doncaster, and then won the Reynoldstown Novices' Chase at Ascot. At the 2016 Cheltenham Festival he came fifth of 8 runners in the RSA Chase and then came fifth in a field of 28 in the Scottish Grand National.

The following season (2016/2017) saw no wins for Vyta Du Roc, although he came a close second in the Bet365 Gold Cup at Sandown Park. He had just three starts in the 2017/2018 season, including a win at Cheltenham in January 2018. This was to be his last victory on the racecourse. In the 2018/2019 season he had four starts, pulling up in three of them and coming seventh of 15 runners in the Glenfarclas Cross Country Chase, won by Tiger Roll, at the Cheltenham Festival in March 2019.

In October 2019, Vyta Du Roc ran in two point-to-points in Ireland, coming fourth and second, and his trainer was changed to Gordon Elliott. He entered another point-to-point in November 2019, coming third. His final race was a 3-mile cross country chase at Punchestown over the banks course on 17 November 2019. He trailed home last of the fifteen finishers, 150 lengths behind the winner. After the race, a veterinary examination carried out at the request of the stewards found him to have blood in his nostrils, possibly as a result of exercise induced pulmonary haemorrhage. Further examination revealed clinical abnormalities.

Vyta Du Roc won seven of his 27 races over fences and hurdles, and was placed on six occasions. He never fell or unseated his rider. He was ridden in 13 of his 27 starts by Daryl Jacob, retained rider for owners Simon Munir and Isaac Souede. Vyta Du Roc had, over his career, amassed £176,514 in prize money for his connections.

Three months after his final race, Vyta Du Roc had been sent to an abattoir in England and was featured in the BBC Panorama programme, The Dark Side of Horse Racing, broadcast on 19 July 2021. Trainer Gordon Elliott denied having sent him to the abattoir, saying that he had been given to someone else at the owners' request.
