= Nina Carberry =

Irish politician and jockey (born 1984)

Nina Carberry MEP
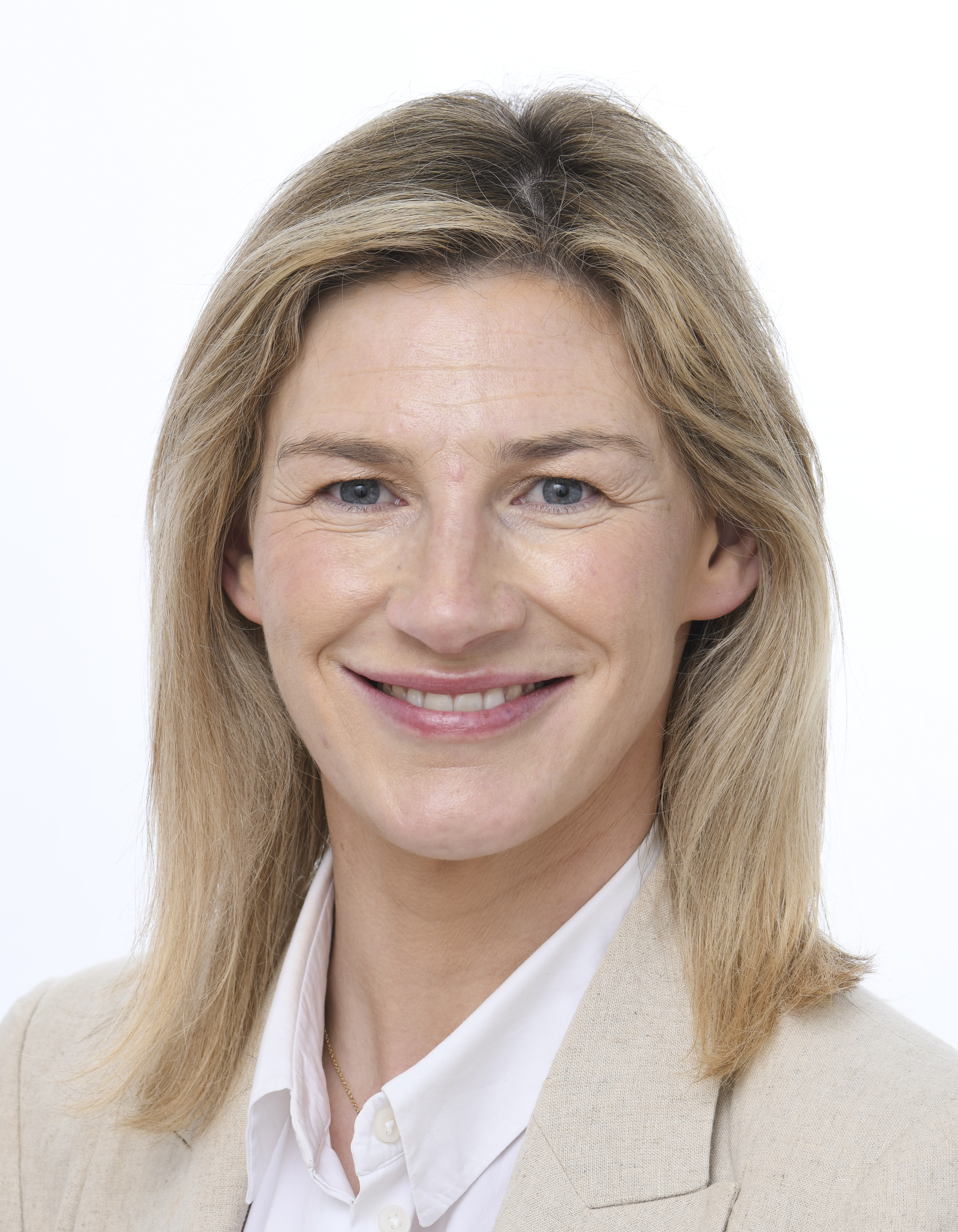
- Carberry in 2024

Member of the European Parliament
- Incumbent
- Assumed office 17 July 2024
- Constituency: Midlands–North-West

Personal details
- Born: 21 July 1984 (age 42) County Meath, Ireland
- Party: Ireland: Fine Gael; EU: European People's Party
- Spouse(s): Ted Walsh, Jnr
- Children: 2
- Parent: Tommy Carberry (father)
- Website: ninacarberrymep.com Horse racing career
- Occupation: Jockey
- Sport: Horse racing
- Career wins: 412

Significant horses
- Organisedconfusion; Garde Champetre; On The Fringe

Nina Carberry (born 21 July 1984) is an Irish Fine Gael politician who has been a Member of the European Parliament (MEP) for Midlands–North-West since the 2024 European Parliament election. She is a former champion amateur National Hunt jockey with seven Cheltenham Festival wins to her name.

== Background ==
Carberry was born into a racing family in County Meath, the daughter of jockey and trainer Tommy Carberry. Two older brothers, Philip and Paul, are also former jockeys, while her maternal uncle Arthur Moore is a trainer. She attended Loreto Secondary School, Navan, where she excelled in athletics and was on an Irish junior basketball squad. After leaving school, she completed a year-long course in holistic health at Plunket College of Further Education in Dublin.

== Racing career ==
Carberry's first win was on Sabrinksy for Noel Meade in the Ladies Derby at the Curragh Racecourse on 15 July 2001, when she was six days short of her seventeenth birthday. While still riding as an amateur conditional jockey, she secured her first win at the Cheltenham Festival on 20-1 outsider Dabiroun in the 2005 Fred Winter Juvenile Novices' Handicap Hurdle. It was the first time in 18 years that a female jockey had won a race at the Cheltenham Festival. Soon afterwards, she was offered a position as amateur stable jockey in the yard of trainer Meade and became a full-time rider.

In the 2005/06 season, Carberry became the second woman after Frances Crowley to win the Irish Amateur Jockey Championship. She retained the title the following year. She became the first female jump jockey to win a Grade 1 race in Ireland or Britain with victory in the Champion Bumper at Punchestown in 2006 on Leading Run, trained by Meade. The following year she won the same race on Mick The Man, also trained by Meade. At the 2007 Cheltenham Festival she won the Cross Country Handicap Chase on Heads Onthe Ground for Enda Bolger. She would go on to further victories in the race on the Bolger-trained Garde Champetre in 2008 and 2009 and Josies Orders in 2016, after the horse who finished first was disqualified. Her four wins in the race were a record (since beaten by Keith Donoghue). She also won the 2015 and 2016 St James's Place Festival Hunter Chase on another Bolger-trained horse, On The Fringe.

In 2011, Carberry won the Irish Grand National on Organisedconfusion, trained by her uncle Arthur Moore, becoming the second woman to win the race after Ann Ferris in 1984. She rode in the Aintree Grand National six times, completing the course on four occasions, with her best result being seventh place on Character Building in 2010. On The Fringe provided her with a victory over Grand National fences in the 2015 Fox Hunters' Chase. As well as race-riding, Carberry worked for a time as an assistant to Meade and rode out for Aidan O'Brien.

Carberry took a break during the 2016/17 season, when she was expecting her first child. She returned to race-riding in September 2017, when her daughter was four months old, winning first time out on Cask Mate in the Connacht Bumper. She retired on the final day of the Punchestown Festival in April 2018, after a winning ride on Josies Orders in the cross country chase. She said: "It's sweet to finish off on a winner. I had more or less decided I would stop today regardless. I'm delighted to have won on Josies Orders for JP [McManus] and Enda as I've enjoyed many great days with them."

== Television work ==
In 2013, Carberry appeared in the documentary The Irish Road To Cheltenham which was shown on RTÉ One television in Ireland. In 2022, she won the fifth series of Dancing With the Stars Ireland. That same year, she became a coach in Ireland's Fittest Family.

== Political career ==
Carberry stood as a Fine Gael candidate for the Midlands–North-West constituency at the 2024 European Parliament elections. She was elected to the fourth seat, with her running mate Maria Walsh.

== Personal life ==
In February 2012, Carberry married Ted Walsh Jnr, son of former jockey and Aintree Grand National winning trainer Ted Walsh. Carberry's brother-in-law is former jockey Ruby Walsh and her sister-in-law is former jockey Katie Walsh. The couple have two daughters.

== Major wins ==
(Republic of Ireland) Ireland

- Champion INH Flat Race – (2) – Leading Run (2006), Mick the Man (2007)

== See also ==
- List of female Grand National jockeys
