= 2018 Grand National =

Horse race at Aintree Racecourse in England

- Grand National
- Location: Aintree Racecourse
- Date: 14 April 2018
- Winning horse: (Republic of Ireland) Tiger Roll
- Starting price: 10/1
- Jockey: (Republic of Ireland) Davy Russell
- Trainer: (Republic of Ireland) Gordon Elliott
- Owner: (Republic of Ireland) Gigginstown House Stud
- Conditions: Heavy

External videos
- Full replay of the 2018 Grand National Racing TV, YouTube

The 2018 Grand National (officially known as the Randox Health 2018 Grand National for sponsorship reasons) was the 171st annual running of the Grand National horse race at Aintree Racecourse near Liverpool, England. The showpiece steeplechase was the pinnacle of a three-day festival which commenced on 12 April 2018. The event was sponsored by Randox Health for the second time.

The race was won by 10/1 shot Tiger Roll, ridden by Davy Russell, in a photo finish from Pleasant Company. All 38 runners returned to the stables, although Saint Are required veterinary attention on the course and Charlie Deutsch, riding Houblon Des Obeaux, was treated on the track after a fall leading to Becher's Brook being bypassed on the second circuit.

== Race card ==
From an initial 105 entries, the final field of 40 runners was declared on 13 April, after Minella Rocco, Vicente and Beeves were all withdrawn from the race and replaced by Thunder And Roses, Delusionofgrandeur and Walk In The Mill. Two contenders, Regal Encore and Walk In The Mill a day after securing its position in the race, were withdrawn on the morning of the race, leaving 38 starters, the smallest field since 1999.

2018 also marked the first National for 30 years to feature three female jockeys in the line-up. 2012 third-placed jockey Katie Walsh paired Baie Des Iles for her sixth ride in the race, whilst Rachael Blackmore and Bryony Frost were both handed their first National rides on Alpha Des Obeaux and Milansbar respectively.

No	Horse	Age	Handicap (st–lb)	SP	Jockey	Trainer
1	Thunder And Roses* (IRE)	10	10-05	33/1	James Slevin	Mouse Morris
2	Blaklion	9	11-10	14/1	Sam Twiston-Davies	Nigel Twiston-Davies
3	Anibale Fly (FR)	8	11-08	10/1	Barry Geraghty	Tony Martin (IRE)
4	The Last Samuri (IRE)	10	11-08	20/1	David Bass	Kim Bailey
5	Valseur Lido (FR)	9	11-07	66/1	Keith Donoghue	Henry de Bromhead (IRE)
6	Total Recall (IRE)	9	11-05	7/1	Paul Townend	Willie Mullins (IRE)
7	Alpha Des Obeaux (FR)	8	11-04	33/1	Rachael Blackmore	Mouse Morris (IRE)
8	Perfect Candidate (IRE)	11	11-03	40/1	Alain Cawley	Fergal O'Brien
9	Shantou Flyer (IRE)	8	11-02	25/1	James Bowen	Richard Hobson
10	Tenor Nivernais (FR)	11	11-01	66/1	Tom O'Brien	Venetia Williams
11	Carlingford Lough (IRE)	12	11-01	33/1	Mark Walsh	John Kiely (IRE)
12	Delusionofgrandeur* (IRE)	8	10-05	50/1	Henry Brooke	Sue Smith
13	Tiger Roll (IRE)	8	10-13	10/1	Davy Russell	Gordon Elliott (IRE)
15	Vieux Lion Rouge (FR)	9	10-13	25/1	Tom Scudamore	David Pipe
16	Chase The Spud	10	10-12	25/1	Paddy Brennan	Fergal O'Brien
17	Warriors Tale	9	10-12	28/1	Sean Bowen	Paul Nicholls
18	Seeyouatmidnight	10	10-12	11/1	Brian Hughes	Sandy Thomson
19	Gas Line Boy (IRE)	12	10-11	25/1	Robbie Dunne	Ian Williams
20	The Dutchman (IRE)	8	10-11	25/1	Harry Cobden	Colin Tizzard
21	Pleasant Company (IRE)	10	10-11	25/1	David Mullins	Willie Mullins (IRE)
22	Ucello Conti (FR)	10	10-10	16/1	Daryl Jacob	Gordon Elliott (IRE)
23	Saint Are (FR)	12	10-10	50/1	Ciaran Gethings	Tom George
25	Raz De Maree (FR)	13	10-09	20/1	Robbie Power	Gavin Cromwell (IRE)
26	I Just Know (IRE)	8	10-08	16/1	Danny Cook	Sue Smith
27	Virgilio (FR)	9	10-08	66/1	Harry Skelton	Dan Skelton
28	Baie Des Iles (FR)	7	10-08	16/1	Katie Walsh (Note: amateur rider)	Ross O'Sullivan (IRE)
29	Maggio (FR)	13	10-08	66/1	Brendan Powell	Patrick Griffin (IRE)
30	Pendra (IRE)	10	10-08	40/1	Aidan Coleman	Charlie Longsdon
31	Buywise (IRE)	11	10-08	40/1	Adam Wedge	Evan Williams
32	Childrens List (IRE)	8	10-08	40/1	Jonathan Burke	Willie Mullins (IRE)
33	Lord Windermere (IRE)	12	10-07	50/1	Andrew Lynch	Jim Culloty (IRE)
34	Captain Redbeard (IRE)	9	10-07	20/1	Sam Coltherd	Stuart Coltherd
35	Houblon Des Obeaux (FR)	11	10-07	33/1	Charlie Deutsch	Venetia Williams
36	Bless The Wings (IRE)	13	10-06	40/1	Jack Kennedy	Gordon Elliott (IRE)
37	Milansbar (IRE)	11	10-06	25/1	Bryony Frost	Neil King
38	Final Nudge (IRE)	9	10-06	33/1	Gavin Sheehan	David Dennis
39	Double Ross (IRE)	12	10-06	40/1	Jamie Bargary	Nigel Twiston-Davies
40	Road To Riches (IRE)	11	10-05	40/1	Sean Flanagan	Noel Meade (IRE)

- Great Britain unless stated.
- Horses 1 & 12 were late replacements

== Race overview ==
Placed horses

1: Tiger Roll

2: Pleasant Company

3: Bless The Wings

4: Anibale Fly

The first fence claimed Perfect Candidate who in turn brought down one of the favourites, Blaklion. I Just Know led the field until falling at Becher's Brook, which also saw Houblon Des Obleaux and Virgilio out of the race. Houblon Des Obeaux's jockey Charlie Deutsch was treated for injuries at the scene, resulting in Becher's being bypassed on the second circuit. Captain Redbeard unseated its rider at the Foinavon fence as Ucello Conti led the field from Double Ross, with The Dutchman, Milansbar and Pleasant Company also prominent. The Canal Turn saw the end of Lord Windermere, Buywise and Final Nudge. Chase The Spud pulled up before The Chair, which claimed Alpha Des Obeaux and Saint Are.

Delusionsofgrandeur and Maggio were pulled up at the beginning of the second circuit, and The Dutchman unseated its rider at Foinavon as Pleasant Company took over the lead. Ucello Conti lost its rider three fences from home, while Seeyouatmidnight challenged Pleasant Company for the lead. Tiger Roll made its move and hit the lead on the 29th fence. On the run-in, Pleasant Company fought back and almost caught Tiger Roll, losing by a head.

There were no fatalities, although Saint Are was treated by veterinarians after being brought down at The Chair. A few days later, Saint Are's retirement from racing was announced. Jockey Charlie Deutsch was kicked in the back by a horse following his fall at Becher's Brook, but recovered and rode a winner at Plumpton the following day.

== Finishing order ==
Twelve runners completed the course as follows:

Position	Horse	Jockey	SP	Distance	Prize money
1	Tiger Roll	Davy Russell	10/1	Head	£500,000
2	Pleasant Company	David Mullins	25/1	11 lengths	£200,000
3	Bless The Wings	Jack Kennedy	40/1	Neck	£100,000
4	Anibale Fly	Barry Geraghty	10/1	21 lengths	£65,000
5	Milansbar	Bryony Frost	25/1	12 lengths	£40,000
6	Road to Riches	Sean Flanagan	33/1	7 lengths	£30,000
7	Gas Line Boy	Robert Dunne	25/1	4 lengths	£20,000
8	Valseur Lido	Keith Donoghue	66/1	3/4 length	£15,000
9	Vieux Lion Rouge	Tom Scudamore	25/1	3/4 length	£10,000
10	Raz De Maree	Robbie Power	20/1	29 lengths	£5,000
11	Seeyouatmidnight	Brian Hughes	11/1	2 3/4 lengths	
12	Baie Des Iles	Katie Walsh	16/1	Last to complete	

- Distance measures from smallest to largest winning margin: nose, short head, head, neck, one length, a distance.

== Non-finishers ==
The runners who failed to complete were as follows:

Fence	Horse	Jockey	SP	Fate
1st	Perfect Candidate	Alain Cawley	50/1	Fell
1st	Blaklion	Sam Twiston-Davies	14/1	Brought down
6th (Becher's Brook)	I Just Know	Danny Cook	14/1	Fell
	Houblon Des Obeaux	Charlie Deutsch	25/1	Fell
	Virgilio	Harry Skelton	50/1	Fell
7th (Foinavon)	Captain Redbeard	Sam Coltherd	20/1	Unseated rider
8th (Canal Turn)	Lord Windermere	Andrew Lynch	50/1	Unseated rider
	Buywise	Adam Wedge	50/1	Unseated rider
	Final Nudge	Gavin Sheehan	33/1	Fell
15th (The Chair)	Chase The Spud	Paddy Brennan	25/1	Pulled up
	Alpha Des Obeaux	Rachael Blackmore	33/1	Fell
	Saint Are	Ciaran Gethings	50/1	Brought down
17th	Delusionofgrandeur	Henry Brooke	50/1	Pulled up
18th	Maggio	Brendan Powell	66/1	Pulled up
23rd (Foinavon)	The Dutchman	Harry Cobden	20/1	Unseated rider
26th	Thunder And Roses	James Slevin	33/1	Pulled up
	The Last Samuri	David Bass	16/1	Pulled up
	Tenor Nivernais	Tom O'Brien	66/1	Pulled up
	Shantou Flyer	James Bowen	20/1	Pulled up
27th (open ditch)	Ucello Conti	Daryl Jacob	16/1	Unseated rider
29th	Total Recall	Paul Townend	7/1 F	Pulled up
	Warriors Tale	Sean Bowen	33/1	Pulled up
	Pendra	Aidan Coleman	80/1	Pulled up
	Double Ross	Jamie Bargary	66/1	Pulled up
Run-in	Carlingford Lough	Mark Walsh	33/1	Pulled up
	Childrens List	Jonathan Burke	66/1	Pulled up

== Broadcasting and media ==
Tiger Roll is over in front, and is trying now to stream away. Pleasant Company in second, Bless The Wings and Anibale Fly in an Irish clean sweep. And it's Tiger Roll who is in full cry, leading by 5 lengths towards the Elbow Plesant Company in second, Bless The Wings and Anibale Fly. Towards the final two hundred yards, the diminutive Tiger Roll senses a place in history, Pleasant Company in second, Bless The Wings and Anibale Fly. They're finishing well strung out, but it's Tiger Roll for Gordon Elliott and is the long wait for a National winner about to end for Davy Russell? Pleasent Company's coming back, Tiger Roll hanging on, Just may have lasted.

— ITV lead commentator Richard Hoiles describes the climax of the race.

As the Grand National is accorded the status of an event of national interest in the United Kingdom and is listed on the Ofcom Code on Sports and Other Listed and Designated Events, it must be shown on free-to-air terrestrial television in the UK. The race was broadcast live on TV by ITV, in the second year of its four-year deal as the exclusive terrestrial broadcaster of horse racing in the UK.

The coverage was co-anchored by Ed Chamberlin and Francesca Cumani. Analysis was provided by former Grand National winning jockeys Sir Anthony McCoy, Mick Fitzgerald and Ruby Walsh, the latter having been ruled out the Aintree meeting through injury. Reports were provided by Oli Bell, Alice Plunkett and Luke Harvey with updates from the betting ring by Matt Chapman and Brian Gleeson. The commentary team was Mark Johnson, Ian Bartlett and Richard Hoiles.

== See also ==
- Horse racing in Great Britain
- List of British National Hunt races
