= Tiger Roll =

Thoroughbred racehorse

- Racing silks of Gigginstown House Stud
- Sire: Authorized
- Grandsire: Montjeu
- Dam: Swiss Roll
- Damsire: Entrepreneur
- Sex: Gelding
- Foaled: 14 March 2010
- Country: Ireland
- Colour: Bay
- Breeder: G O'Brien
- Owner: Gigginstown House Stud
- Trainer: Gordon Elliott; Denise Foster
- Record: 43: 13-8-3
- Earnings: £1,437,256

Major wins
- Triumph Hurdle (2014); National Hunt Chase Challenge Cup (2017); Glenfarclas Cross Country Chase (2018, 2019, 2021); Grand National (2018, 2019); Boyne Hurdle (2019)

Tiger Roll (foaled 14 March 2010) is a retired Irish-bred Thoroughbred racehorse who competed in National Hunt racing and won the Grand National in 2018 and 2019. He has also won five times at the Cheltenham Festival: the Triumph Hurdle in 2014, the National Hunt Chase Challenge Cup in 2017 and the Glenfarclas Cross Country Chase in 2018, 2019 and 2021.

Although bred for the flat, his first race was as a three-year-old gelding over hurdles. After winning this race he was sold to Michael O'Leary's Gigginstown House Stud and put into training at Gordon Elliott's Cullentra House Stables in County Meath, Ireland, where he has remained ever since.

After success as a four-year-old in the Triumph Hurdle, he had a chequered career over hurdles with just two wins in his next eleven starts, which included one entry in a flat race. His chasing career began when he was six, and, after winning or being placed in several novice chases, he won a handicap at Limerick and then the Grade 2 National Hunt Challenge Cup at Cheltenham in 2017. He achieved fame with victories at Cheltenham and Aintree in 2018 and then again in 2019, when he became the first horse since Red Rum in 1973 and 1974 to win back-to-back Grand Nationals.

He was ridden to victory in both Grand Nationals and the Triumph Hurdle by Davy Russell. Lisa O'Neill and Keith Donoghue rode him in his other Cheltenham victories. Bryan Cooper was his regular jockey until 2016 and he has also been ridden in several races by Jack Kennedy and Donagh Meyler, with Robert James, James Bowen, Robbie Power, Sam Ewing, Jamie Codd, Davy Condon, Mark Quinlan and R. P. Cleary each having ridden him once. Grooms Louise Magee and Louise Dunn usually led him up.

== Background ==
Tiger Roll, by 2007 Epsom Derby winner Authorized out of Swiss Roll, was foaled 14 March 2010. He is a bay gelding with a white star and, at 15.2 hands, is small for a racehorse. He was bred in Ireland by Gerry O’Brien and bought as a foal by Godolphin for 70,000 guineas at Tattersalls. He never raced for Godolphin and was sold for £10,000 three years later to Devon trainer and former Grand National winning jockey Nigel Hawke.

== 2013/2014 season ==
Tiger Roll's first race was a juvenile hurdle at Market Rasen Racecourse in November 2013. Ridden by Mark Quinlan, he won by 3¾ lengths. Two months later, in January 2014, he was sold for £80,000 to O'Leary's Gigginstown House Stud and put into training at Gordon Elliott's Cullentra House Stables in County Meath, Ireland. He has remained with the same owner and trainer ever since, with Denise Foster taking over from Gordon Elliott at Cullentra in March 2021 after Elliott was banned for a year (with six months suspended).

His first race for his new owner and trainer was the Grade 1 Spring Juvenile Hurdle at Leopardstown in February 2014. He was ridden by Bryan Cooper and came second, beaten 2¼ lengths by Guitar Pete.

The following month he made his first appearance at the Cheltenham Festival, competing against 15 other four-year-olds in the Grade 1 Triumph Hurdle. Partnered for the first time with jockey Davy Russell and starting at odds of 10/1, he won by 3¼ lengths with Kentucky Hyden in second place and Guitar Pete in third.

Tiger Roll's last race of the season was in the Champion Four Year Old Hurdle at Punchestown, where he started favourite but came a disappointing seventh.

== 2014/2015 season ==
After a summer break, Tiger Roll returned to the racecourse in October for a 2m½f hurdle race for four year olds with a field of four at Cheltenham. Ridden by Bryan Cooper, he narrowly beat the favourite Calipto. Two weeks later he was pulled up lame in the Grade 2 WKD Hurdle at Down Royal.

In the December Festival Hurdle at Leopardstown Tiger Roll was competing for the first time against older horses and came sixth of seventh runners, beaten nineteen lengths by Hurricane Fly. He then finished fourth of six runners 18½ lengths behind Hurricane Fly in the Irish Champion Hurdle in January 2015. The next month he was entered in a Grade 2 hurdle race at Gowran Park and came third of five runners, beaten 18 lengths by Kitten Rock. After these disappointing results, Tiger Roll started at odds of 50/1 in the Stayers' Hurdle over 3 miles at Cheltenham in March. It was the first time he had run over a distance of more than about 2 miles. Ridden for the first, and only, time by Davy Condon he was eased up when beaten approaching the last and finished 13th of 16 runners behind Cole Harden. His final outing of the season, ridden by his regular jockey Bryan Cooper, was in the Punchestown Champion Hurdle over two miles. He finished last of the field of four, 35½ lengths behind winner Faugheen.

== 2015/2016 and 2016/17 seasons ==
After a break of nearly eleven months from May 2015 to March 2016, Tiger Roll ran in a 2-mile flat race on the all-weather track at Dundalk Stadium. Ridden by R.P. Cleary, he finished a close second to Sir Raston. It was the only flat race of Tiger Roll's career. In April he was unplaced in a 3m½f hurdle race at Aintree and then pulled up lame in a handicap hurdle at the Punchestown Festival.

It was in May 2016 that Tiger Roll began his chasing career, entering a beginners' chase over 2m1f and 11 fences at Ballinrobe. Partnered by conditional jockey Jack Kennedy, he won by eight lengths. Over the following four months he competed in six novice chases in Ireland, winning one, coming second in three and fourth in one, and unseating Bryan Cooper in one. In October 2016, ridden by conditional jockey Donagh Meyler, he won the Munster National Handicap at Limerick over 3 miles and in a field of fifteen. Later that month he came third in a novice chase at Cheltenham, ridden for the only time by amateur jockey Jamie Codd, and third again in a chase at Wexford.

After a break of over four months, Tiger Roll returned to racing in March at the 2017 Cheltenham Festival with victory in the Grade 2 National Hunt Challenge Cup Amateur Riders' Novices' Chase over 4 miles, ridden for the only time by Lisa O'Neill. His final race of the season was the Irish Grand National at Fairyhouse, in which he was pulled up.

== 2017/18 season ==
Tiger Roll's 2017/18 season began with second place in a chase at Wexford. He was then pulled up at Clonmel where he was being ridden for the first time by Keith Donoghue, who would become his regular jockey (except for Grand Nationals in which he is ridden by Davy Russell). In December 2017 Tiger Roll and Keith Donoghue had their first taste of the cross country course at Cheltenham, coming fifth behind stablemate Bless the Wings.

In March 2018, after a break of nearly three months, Tiger Roll returned to Cheltenham and won the Glenfarclas Cross Country Chase, beating Urgent de Gregaine by two lengths.

His third win at the Cheltenham Festival was followed by victory, at his first attempt, in the 2018 Grand National at Aintree. Ridden by Davy Russell and starting at odds of 10/1, he went into the lead two from home and held off a late challenge from Pleasant Company to win by a head in a photo-finish. The win brought his total earnings to almost £802,000. Trainer Gordon Elliott said after the race: "When you look back at his record he's won three different types of races at the Cheltenham Festival. To come on and win a National is unbelievable. He doesn’t owe us too much now."

== 2018/19 season ==
Tiger Roll started the 2018–19 season by coming fourth in a cross country chase at Cheltenham in November 2018. He then surprised everyone by winning his 2019 warm-up race, the Boyne Hurdle race at Navan in February, at odds of 25/1, partnered by his regular jockey Keith Donoghue. In March he started hot favourite for the Glenfarcas Cross Country Chase and duly won by 22 lengths. At Aintree, on 6 April, partnered by Davy Russell and carrying six pounds more than in 2018, he started favourite for the Grand National at odds of 4/1 and won by more than two lengths from Magic of Light. This victory made him the first horse since Red Rum in 1974 to win back-to-back Grand Nationals.

In November 2019 Tiger Roll sustained an injury and underwent surgery to remove a chip from a joint in a leg.

== 2019/20 season ==
Tiger Roll's first race of the season, after a break of more than ten months, was the Boyne Hurdle in February, in which he came fifth. In March, he returned to the Cheltenham Festival to attempt a third successive win in the Glenfarclas Cross Country Chase. Starting as odds-on favourite, he was beaten into second place by 17 lengths by Easysland and finished too tired to go into the unsaddling enclosure. After the race, jockey Keith Donoghue said: "He ran his heart out. We were always afraid of the ground and that's what got him beat. Every time he hit heavy patches, we’d just struggle. When he came back out on to a bit of nice ground, he’d come back on the bridle again. That just told in the end. I thought, going over the last three hedges, I had every chance but the winner was very good on the day and we were beat fair and square."

== 2020/21 season ==
Tiger Roll made his seasonal debut on 22 October in a flat race at Navan. He was ridden by apprentice jockey Sam Ewing and came sixth of nine runners. It was his first appearance in a flat race on turf, having come second in a flat race on the all weather course at Dundalk in March 2016. On 13 November 2020 he returned to Cheltenham to run in the Glenfarclas Cross Country Handicap Chase. Sent off 4/1 second favourite and carrying top weight, he was pulled up after the 20th fence having dropped to the back of the field. Jockey Robbie Power, having his first ride on the horse, explained: "He was never travelling and never had a cut at his fences. I pulled him up as he was in no sort of rhythm." Trainer Gordon Elliot said: "It was disappointing. He never really travelled or jumped. He's not getting any younger. Maybe his better days are behind him. We'll see how he is, but on his last two runs he doesn't look like the horse he was last year." In February 2021 Tiger Roll came last of six runners in the Boyne Hurdle at Navan. On 2 March it was announced that he had been withdrawn from the Grand National on account of the weight (11st 9lb) allocated to him.

On 17 March 2021 Tiger Roll returned to the Cheltenham festival to compete in the Cross Country Chase. On this occasion his trainer was Denise Foster, as Gordon Elliott was serving a six-month suspension after a photo emerged of him sitting astride a dead horse. Tiger Roll was sent off second favourite at odds of 9/2 and beat the favourite, Easysland, by 18 lengths. Jockey Keith Donoghue said after the race: "Never underestimate the Tiger. We know the horse he is. He loved it and that's the Tiger we see at home. He is just a legend." With his victory in the 2021 Cross Country Chase, Tiger Roll became one of only three horses to have won five or more races at the Cheltenham Festival, joining Quevega (6 wins) and Golden Miller (5 wins).

Having been withdrawn from the Grand National, Tiger Roll was instead entered in the Betway Bowl Grade 1 chase at the Aintree Meeting on 9 April 2021. He trailed home fourth of five finishers, 92 lengths behind the winner, Clan des Obeaux, and the stewards held an inquiry into his running and riding. Jockey Jack Kennedy's explanation, that Tiger Roll was never really travelling due to the fast early pace and a mistake at the 3rd, was noted.

== 2021/22 season ==
Tiger Roll was pulled up in his first race of the season, the Many Clouds Chase at Aintree on 4 December, and came 14th of 17 runners in the Navan Handicap Hurdle the following month.

On 15 February 2022, owner O'Leary announced he was withdrawing Tiger Roll from the 2022 Grand National after the horse was assigned a 161 rating. Calling out what he claimed to be the "idiotic opinion" of the handicapper who "doesn't want Tiger Roll to run" in the Grand National, O'Leary announced that Tiger Roll would likely make his final start in the Cross Country Chase, after which he would be retired.

Tiger Roll was narrowly denied victory in his farewell race by stablemate Delta Work, also owned by O'Leary. Ridden by Davy Russell, Tiger Roll went off at 3/1 in the Cross Country Chase at the Cheltenham Festival on 16 March 2022. He went into the lead at the 24th of 32 fences but was headed on the run in by 5/2 favourite Delta Work, who won by three quarters of a length.

In August 2022 Tiger Roll was placed 3rd in the Dublin Horse Show in the "Racehorse to Riding Horse" class, ridden by Ted O'Leary.

== Grand National record ==
Grand National	Position	Jockey	Age	Weight	SP	Distance
2018	1st	Davy Russell	8	10-11	10/1	Won by a head
2019	1st	Davy Russell	9	11-5	4/1 F	Won by 2¾ lengths
