= Keith Donoghue =

Irish jockey

Keith Donoghue (born 15 September 1990) is an Irish jockey who competes in National Hunt racing. He has had multiple successes at Grade level and holds the record of five wins in the Glenfarclas Cross Country Chase at the Cheltenham Festival. After a long association with trainer Gordon Elliott, he decided to switch to riding freelance and has had notable victories for trainer Gavin Cromwell.

== Background ==
Donoghue grew up in Dunshaughlin, County Meath, in a family with racing connections. His maternal great uncle, Andy Lynch, was a trainer and his grandfather worked at Fairyhouse Racecourse and took the young Donoghue to watch races there. Donoghue went hunting with his mother and took part in pony racing, riding over 150 winners. He left school at fifteen to work at the yard of Gordon Elliott.

== Racing career ==
Donoghue was sixteen when he rode his first winner, Nino Cochise for Elliott at Listowel on 13 September 2009. Standing at about six feet tall with a sturdy frame, he experienced weight problems and in March 2017 he announced that he was taking a break from racing. It meant that he missed a winning ride on Labaik in the Supreme Novices' Hurdle at the 2017 Cheltenham Festival. But he was race-riding again in May 2017 and at the 2018 Cheltenham Festival rode Tiger Roll to victory in the Glenfarclas Cross Country Chase. Donoghue would go on to win the race a record five times. He was unable to get his weight down enough to take the 2018 Grand National ride on Tiger Roll, who won under Davy Russell, with Donoghue coming eighth on Valseur Lido. The following season, Donoghue secured his first Grade 1 victory when Hardline won the Matchbook Betting Exchange Novice Chase at Limerick for Elliott in December 2018. In February 2019, he rode Tiger Roll to an unexpected 25/1 victory in the Grade 2 Boyne Hurdle. A few weeks later the pair won the second of their three Cross Country wins at the Cheltenham Festival.

After fourteen years with Elliott, Donoghue decided to ride as a freelance, although still taking rides for Elliott, including the winning ride on Delta Work in the Cross Country Chase at the 2023 Cheltenham Festival. He ended the 2022/23 season with a career-best of 48 winners and fifth place in the Irish Jump Jockeys Championship. As a freelancer he established a particularly strong association with trainer Gavin Cromwell, which included success on Limerick Lace in the Liberthine Mares' Chase at the 2025 Cheltenham Festival. He has also ridden winners for his older brother, Ian Donoghue, who took out a trainer's licence in 2021.

== Cheltenham Festival winners (6) ==
- Glenfarclas Cross Country Chase - (5) Tiger Roll (2018, 2019, 2021), Delta Work (2023), Stumptown (2025)
- Liberthine Mares' Chase - (1) Limerick Lace (2025)

== Other major wins ==
(Republic of Ireland) Ireland

- Matchbook Betting Exchange Novice Chase - (1) Hardline (2018)
- Ladbrokes Champion Chase - (1) The Storyteller (2020)
- Spring Juvenile Hurdle - (1) Hello Neighbour (2025)

The Czech Republic

- Velká pardubická - (1) Stumptown (2025), Final Orders (2026)
