= Gordon Elliott (racehorse trainer) =

Irish horse trainer

Gordon Elliott (born 2 March 1978) is a County Meath-based National Hunt racehorse trainer. After riding as an amateur jockey, he took out a trainer's licence in 2006. He was 29 when his first Grand National entry, the 33 to 1 outsider Silver Birch, won the 2007 race. In 2018 and 2019 he won the Grand National with Tiger Roll, ridden by Davy Russell and owned by Gigginstown House Stud, the first horse since Red Rum to win the race twice. In 2018 he also won the Irish Grand National, with General Principle. On two occasions, in 2017 and 2018, he was the top trainer at the Cheltenham Festival.

In March 2021 the Irish Horseracing Regulatory Board imposed a twelve-month ban (with six months suspended) on Elliott after a photograph surfaced of him sitting on a dead horse on his gallops in 2019.

== Jockey ==
With little family background in racing, Elliott is sometimes described as Irish racing's great "blow-in". The son of a panel-beater, he grew up in Summerhill, County Meath and entered the racing world at the age of thirteen, working for trainer Tony Martin at weekends and holidays. Elliott took out a licence as an amateur jockey when he was sixteen and rode on the racecourse and in point-to-points. His first winner on the racecourse came on Caitriona's Choice in a bumper at Ballinrobe. He went on to ride a total of 200 point-to-point winners and 46 winners on the racecourse, with the highlight of his riding career being his win in the Punchestown Champion Bumper on the Nigel Twiston-Davies-trained King's Road in 1998. He also had five winners in the United States. Although based mainly with Tony Martin during his riding career, he spent a year in England with trainer Martin Pipe. He retired as a jockey through injury in 2005.

== Trainer ==
Elliott took out his trainer's licence in 2006 and had his first winner at Perth on 11 June 2006. On 14 April 2007 he became the youngest ever trainer to win the Grand National. The winner, Silver Birch, was owned by Brian Walsh of County Kildare, and ridden by Robbie Power. Despite having won the Grand National, Elliott had not at that stage trained a winner on the track back home in Ireland. The first winner he trained in Ireland was Toran Road at Kilbeggan on 5 May 2007.

Although best known for his victories over jumps, Elliott had a major win on the flat in August 2010 when Dirar won the Ebor Handicap at York Racecourse. He has also had victories at Royal Ascot, with Commissioned winning the Queen Alexandra Stakes in 2016 and Pallasator winning the same race in 2018.

Originally based at Capranny Stables, a rented yard in Trim, County Meath, Elliott bought the 78-acre Cullentra House Farm at Longwood, County Meath in 2011 and built a training facility with stabling for over 200 horses, gallops, schooling grounds, and an equine pool.

His first winner at the Cheltenham Festival as a trainer was Chicago Grey in the National Hunt Chase Challenge Cup in 2011. He won the 2016 Cheltenham Gold Cup with Don Cossack. In 2017 he was top trainer at the Cheltenham Festival and the following year repeated the achievement.

On 2 April 2018 Elliott won the Irish Grand National with General Principle, ridden by JJ Slevin. Elliott had saddled 13 of the 30 horses in the field. That year he also won the Aintree Grand National with his horse Tiger Roll, ridden by Davy Russell and owned by Michael O'Leary's Gigginstown House Stud, narrowly beating the Willie Mullins runner Pleasant Company. Elliott also trained the third place horse Bless The Wings. He won the Aintree Grand National again in 2019 with Tiger Roll, only the sixth repeat winner in the race's history.

== Dead horse photograph ==
On 28 February 2021, the Irish Horseracing Regulatory Board (IHRB) launched an investigation into an image of Elliott, which was widely circulated on social media, sitting on a dead horse and making a peace sign. Elliott confirmed the photograph was genuine, issued an apology and said he was fully cooperating with the investigation. The animal rights organisation PETA and the British Horseracing Authority condemned the photograph. On 1 March the British Horse Racing Authority announced that Elliott would be banned from racing horses in Britain while the investigation in Ireland took place, although the horses would be allowed to run if transferred to another trainer. It was confirmed that the photo was taken in 2019 and showed a horse owned by Gigginstown House Stud, Morgan, that had died while being ridden on the gallops.

Minister of State for Sport Jack Chambers said that Elliott must be "held fully accountable for his actions" and that the photograph showed "a complete and profound error of judgement". Chambers told Morning Ireland that he was "shocked, appalled and horrified" by the image and that it was "really disturbing from an animal welfare perspective".

On 2 March Cheveley Park Stud announced that they would move their horses – Envoi Allen and Quilixios to go to Henry de Bromhead and Sir Gerhard to go to Willie Mullins. Elliott's leading owners, Michael and Eddie O'Leary through their Gigginstown House Stud, expressed their support for him despite being "deeply disappointed by the unacceptable photo".

On 5 March 2021 the IHRB convened a hearing and banned Elliott from racing for twelve months with six months suspended, leaving him unable to train or attend a race meeting or point-to-point until September. He was also ordered to pay costs of €15,000. Elliott accepted the ruling. Later that month the stable employee who took the photograph was banned for nine months (with seven suspended).

== BBC Panorama programme ==
In July 2021, Elliott featured in a BBC Panorama programme that investigated the fate of British and Irish racehorses who end up in abattoirs. Three of the horses were formerly trained by Elliott, who denied having sent them to the abattoir. He said two of the horses were sent to a horse dealer to be re-homed or humanely euthanised, while the third was given to someone else at the owner's request. The former horses were bay mare Kiss me Kayf, who had had no success on the racecourse, and bay gelding High Expectations, who had won seven races. The latter horse, owned by Simon Munir and Isaac Souede, was grey gelding Vyta Du Roc, who won the 2016 Reynoldstown Novices' Chase. Following the programme, Munir and Souede removed their horses from Elliott's yard.

== Awards ==
In 2007 Elliott won the inaugural Meath Sportsperson of the Year award. He won the award again in 2018 and 2019.

== Personal life ==
Elliott was engaged to champion point-to-point rider Annie Bowles, with whom he set up Cullentra House Stables. The couple separated and Bowles married Ballarat trainer Archie Alexander.

== Cheltenham winners (42) ==
- Baring Bingham Novices' Hurdle – (2) Samcro (2018), Envoi Allen (2020)
- Brown Advisory & Merriebelle Stable Plate Handicap Chase – (1) The Storyteller (2018)
- Champion Bumper – (2) Fayonagh (2017), Envoi Allen (2019)
- Cheltenham Gold Cup – (1) Don Cossack (2016)
- Coral Cup – (3) Carlito Brigante (2011), Diamond King (2016), Commander of Fleet (2022)
- David Nicholson Mares' Hurdle – (2) Apples Jade (2017), Wodhooh (2026)
- Fred Winter Juvenile Novices' Handicap Hurdle – (4) Flaxen Flare (2013), Veneer of Charm (2018), Aramax (2020), Jazzy Matty (2023)
- Fulke Walwyn Kim Muir Challenge Cup – (2) Cause of Causes (2016), Milan Native (2020)
- Glenfarclas Cross Country Chase – (5) Cause of Causes (2017), Tiger Roll (2018, 2019), Delta Work (2022, 2023)
- Martin Pipe Conditional Jockeys' Handicap Hurdle – (4) Champagne Classic (2017), Blow By Blow (2018), Better Days Ahead (2024), Wodhooh (2025)
- National Hunt Chase Challenge Cup – (4) Chicago Grey (2011), Cause of Causes (2015), Tiger Roll (2017), Ravenhill (2020)
- Pertemps Final – (3) Delta Work (2018), Sire Du Berlais (2019, 2020)
- Stayers' Hurdle - (2) Sire Du Berlais (2023), Teahupoo (2024)
- Spa Novices' Hurdle - (1) Stellar Story (2024)
- Supreme Novices' Hurdle – (1) Labaik (2017)
- Triumph Hurdle – (2) Tiger Roll (2014), Farclas (2018)
- Golden Miller Novices' Chase – (1) Samcro (2020)
- Johnny Henderson Grand Annual Chase – (1) Chosen Mate (2020)
- JLT Novices Chase – (1) Shattered Love (2018)

== Other major wins ==
(Republic of Ireland) Ireland

- Irish Gold Cup – (2) Delta Work (2020), Conflated (2022)
- Alanna Homes Champion Novice Hurdle – (1) Dortmund Park (2018)
- Arkle Novice Chase - (1) Romeo Coolio (2026)
- Champion INH Flat Race – (2) Fayonagh (2017), With Nolimit (2026)
- Champion Stayers Hurdle - (2) Teahupoo (2024, 2025)
- Chanelle Pharma Novice Hurdle – (1) Samcro (2018)
- Christmas Hurdle – (6) Prince of Scars (2015), Apple's Jade (2017, 2018, 2019), Irish Point (2023), Teahupoo (2025)
- December Festival Hurdle – (2) Mick Jazz (2017), Brighterdaysahead (2024)
- Dooley Insurance Group Champion Novice Chase – (4) Mount Benbulben (2013), The Storyteller (2018), Delta Work (2019), Western Fold (2026)
- Drinmore Novice Chase – (9) Jessies Dream (2010), Don Cossack (2013), No More Heroes (2015), Death Duty (2017), Delta Work (2018), Envoi Allen (2020), Mighty Potter (2022), Croke Park (2024), Romeo Coolio (2025)
- Fort Leney Novice Chase – (6) No More Heroes (2015), Shattered Love (2017), Delta Work (2018), Battleoverdoyen (2019), Fury Road (2021), Croke Park (2024)
- Golden Cygnet Novice Hurdle – (1) Commander of Fleet (2019)
- Greenmount Park Novice Chase – (3) Dounikos (2017), Hardline (2018), Gerri Colombe (2022)
- Hatton's Grace Hurdle – (6) Apple's Jade (2016, 2017, 2018), Teahupoo (2022,2023,2025)
- Irish Champion Hurdle – (2) Apple's Jade (2019), Brighterdaysahead (2026)
- Irish Daily Mirror Novice Hurdle – (1) Champagne Classic (2017)
- John Durkan Memorial Punchestown Chase – (1) Don Cossack (2014)
- Ladbrokes Champion Chase – (5) Roi du Mee (2013), Don Cossack (2015), Outlander (2017), The Storyteller (2020), Gerri Colombe (2023)
- Mares Champion Hurdle – (2) Mae's Choice (2012), Apple's Jade (2017)
- Morgiana Hurdle – (2) Abacadabras (2020), Brighterdaysahead (2024)
- Paddy Power Future Champions Novice Hurdle – (5) Abracadabras (2019), Mighty Potter (2021), Caldwell Potter (2023), Romeo Coolio (2024), Skylight Hustle (2025)
- Punchestown Gold Cup – (1) Don Cossack (2015)
- Racing Post Novice Chase – (4) Clarcam (2014), Found A Fifty (2023), Croke Park (2024), Romeo Coolio (2025)
- Royal Bond Novice Hurdle – (4) Mengli Khan (2017), Envoi Allen (2019), Ballyadam (2020), Farren Glory (2023)
- Ryanair Gold Cup – (1) Realt Mor (2013)
- Savills Chase – (4) Outlander (2016), Delta Work (2019), Galvin (2021), Conflated (2022)
- Slaney Novice Hurdle – (5) Death Duty (2017), Battleoverdoyen (2019), Envoi Allen (2020), Ginto (2022), The Yellow Clay (2025)
- Spring Juvenile Hurdle – (2) Mega Fortune (2017), Quilixios (2021)
- Bective Stud Champion Novice Hurdle - (1) Mighty Potter (2022)
- Dr P. J. Moriarty Novice Chase -(1) Mighty Potter (2023)

(United Kingdom) Great Britain

- Aintree Bowl - (1) Gerri Colombe (2024)
- Aintree Hurdle - (1) Brighterdaysahead (2026)
- Anniversary 4-Y-O Juvenile Hurdle - (1) Mange Tout (2026)
- Liverpool Hurdle - (2) Sire Du Berlais (2022,2023)
- Manifesto Novices' Chase – (1) Clarcam (2015)
- Maghull Novices' Chase - (1) Found A Fifty (2024)
- Mildmay Novices' Chase - (1) Gerri Colombe (2023)
- Top Novices' Hurdle – (1) Felix Desjy (2019)
- Mersey Novices' Hurdle - (4) Three Stripe Life (2022), Irish Point (2023), Brighterdaysahead (2024), Honesty Policy (2025)
- Scilly Isles Novices' Chase - (1) Gerri Colombe (2023)

United States

- Grand National Hurdle Stakes – (3) Jury Duty (2018), Zanahiyr (2025), Western Fold (2026)
- Colonial Cup Stakes - (1) Western Fold (2026)

== Major wins as a jockey ==
(Republic of Ireland) Ireland

- Champion INH Flat Race – (1) King's Road (1998)

== See also ==
- List of Grand National winners
