= Garde Champetre =

French-bred Thoroughbred racehorse

- Racing Colours of John P McManus
- Sire: Garde Royale
- Dam: Clementine Fleurie
- Damsire: Lionel II
- Sex: Gelding
- Foaled: 27 March 1999
- Country: France
- Colour: Bay
- Breeder: Olivier Delegue
- Owner: John P McManus
- Trainer: E Bolger
- Record: 45:16,14,0
- Earnings: £266,978

Garde Champetre (27 March 1999 – 13 March 2012) was a French-bred, Irish-trained thoroughbred racehorse.

He is best known for winning the Glenfarclas Cross Country Chase at the Cheltenham Festival twice in the colours of owner J.P. McManus.

== Career ==
After starting his racing life in France, Garde Champetre was brought to the UK and owned by racing syndicate Million In Mind. Trained by Paul Nicholls, across 6 races in the 2003–04 season, winning two races and scoring three second place finishes.

Million In Mind sold Garde Champetre for 530,000gns in 2004 to prolific owner John P. McManus making Garde Champetre the most expensive National Hunt horse to go through auction. Following the sale, training was switched to Jonjo O'Neill. It wasn't until October 15, 2006, that he would win again, in a minor race at Carlisle Racecourse ridden by AP McCoy.

In December 2007, training moved to Enda Bolger in Ireland. Garde Champetre switched to cross country races and began to have an immediate impact, winning 3 races in a row under Nina Carberry at the Cheltenham Festival and at Punchestown. He would return to Cheltenham in March 2009 to successfully defend his title and again at Punchestown in April.

Garde Champetre went off as 7/4F for the 2010 Glenfarclas Cross Country Chase but finished 5th.

Returning to Cheltenham for the 2012 Glenfarclas Cross Country Chase, Garde Champetre went off at 10/1 with regular jockey Nina Carberry. Sadly, during this race, he suffered a fatal injury.
