= 2019 Grand National =

172nd Grand National horse race

- Grand National
- Location: Aintree
- Date: 6 April 2019
- Winning horse: (Republic of Ireland) Tiger Roll
- Starting price: 4/1 F
- Jockey: (Republic of Ireland) Davy Russell
- Trainer: (Republic of Ireland) Gordon Elliot
- Owner: (Republic of Ireland) Gigginstown House Stud
- Conditions: Good to soft

External videos
- Full replay of the 2019 Grand National Racing TV, YouTube

The 2019 Grand National (officially known as the Randox Health Grand National for sponsorship reasons) was the 172nd annual running of the Grand National horse race at Aintree Racecourse near Liverpool, England. The showpiece steeplechase was held on 6 April and is the pinnacle of a three-day festival.

The event was sponsored by Randox Health as part of an agreement signed in 2016 for the company to sponsor the race for five years starting in 2017.

The race was won by 4/1 favourite Tiger Roll, ridden by Davy Russell and trained by Gordon Elliott. Tiger Roll became the first horse since Red Rum in 1974 to win back-to-back Nationals, as well as the first favorite to win the race since Comply or Die in 2008. 19 of the 40 horses that started managed to complete the course.

In the race, Up For Review sustained a neck fracture after being brought down at the first fence. He was the first equine fatality in the race since 2012, after which the fences were drastically altered and softened.

== Race card ==
112 entries were received, including 47 from Ireland. The final line-up of 40 horses was announced on 4 April 2019. Mall Dini was withdrawn the following day due to injury and replaced by Just A Par. No further withdrawals meant that a full field of 40 horses were sent to the start line.

Gordon Elliott broke the record for the most horses trained in a single running of the race, entering 11 horses, breaking the record set by Martin Pipe of 10 participants 18 years previously (2001). Elliott had also been the initial trainer for both Outlander and Don Poli, though these horses were sold prior to the race and passed on to new trainers.

No	Horse	Age	Handicap (st–lb)	SP	Jockey	Trainer
1	Anibale Fly	9	11-10	10/1	Mark Walsh	Tony Martin
2	Valtor	10	11-06	66/1	Daryl Jacob	Nicky Henderson
3	Tiger Roll	9	11-05	4/1 F	Davy Russell	Gordon Elliott
4	Outlander	11	11-04	66/1	James Bowen	Richard Spencer
5	Don Poli	10	11-03	66/1	Patrick Mullins (Note: amateur jockey)	Philip Kirby
6	Go Conquer	10	11-03	33/1	Sam Twiston-Davies	Nigel Twiston-Davies
7	Mala Beach	11	11-02	33/1	Jamie Codd	Gordon Elliott
8	Minella Rocco	9	11-01	33/1	Richie McLernon	Jonjo O'Neill
9	Lake View Lad	9	11-01	14/1	Henry Brooke	Nick Alexander
10	Pleasant Company	11	11-01	12/1	Paul Townend	Willie Mullins
11	Ballyoptic	9	11-01	25/1	Tom Bellamy	Nigel Twiston-Davies
12	Dounikos	8	11-00	16/1	Jack Kennedy	Gordon Elliott
13	Rathvinden	11	11-00	8/1	Ruby Walsh	Willie Mullins
14	One For Arthur	10	11-00	25/1	Derek Fox	Lucinda Russell
15	Rock The Kasbah	9	10-13	16/1	Richard Johnson	Philip Hobbs
16	Warriors Tale	10	10-13	66/1	Harry Cobden	Paul Nicholls
17	Regal Encore	11	10-12	66/1	Jonathan Burke	Anthony Honeyball
18	Magic Of Light	8	10-11	66/1	Paddy Kennedy	Jessica Harrington
19	A Toi Phil	9	10-11	50/1	Denis O'Regan	Gordon Elliott
20	Jury Duty	8	10-11	10/1	Robbie Power	Gordon Elliott
21	Noble Endeavor	10	10-10	50/1	Mark Enright	Gordon Elliott
22	Monbeg Notorious	8	10-10	50/1	Sean Bowen	Gordon Elliott
23	Ramses De Teillee	7	10-09	20/1	David Noonan	David Pipe
24	Tea For Two	10	10-09	25/1	Lizzie Kelly	Jane Williams
25	Just A Par	12	10-02	100/1	Aidan Coleman	James Moffatt
26	Step Back	9	10-07	25/1	Nico de Boinville	Mark Bradstock
27	Ultragold	11	10-07	50/1	Tom O'Brien	Colin Tizzard
28	Blow By Blow	8	10-06	66/1	Andrew Ring	Gordon Elliott
29	Up For Review	10	10-06	33/1	Danny Mullins	Willie Mullins
30	Singlefarmpayment	9	10-06	50/1	Paddy Brennan	Tom George
31	Vieux Lion Rouge	10	10-06	50/1	Tom Scudamore	David Pipe
32	Valseur Lido	10	10-06	66/1	Rachael Blackmore	Henry de Bromhead
33	Vintage Clouds	9	10-04	11/1	Danny Cook	Sue Smith
34	General Principle	10	10-04	33/1	J J Slevin	Gordon Elliott
35	Livelovelaugh	9	10-04	25/1	David Mullins	Willie Mullins
36	Walk In The Mill	9	10-04	25/1	James Best	Robert Walford
37	Folsom Blue	12	10-04	66/1	Luke Dempsey	Gordon Elliott
38	Captain Redbeard	10	10-03	66/1	Sam Coltherd	Stuart Coltherd
39	Bless The Wings	14	10-03	50/1	Robbie Dunne	Gordon Elliott
40	Joe Farrell	10	10-02	14/1	Adam Wedge	Rebecca Curtis

== Finishing order ==
Placed horses

1: Tiger Roll

2: Magic Of Light

3: Rathvinden

4: Walk In The Mill

Position	Name	Age	Handicap (st–lb)	SP	Jockey	Trainer	Prize money
1	Tiger Roll	9	11-05	4/1 F	Davy Russell	Gordon Elliott	£561,300
2	Magic of Light	8	10-11	66/1	Paddy Kennedy	Jessica Harrington	£211,100
3	Rathvinden	11	11-00	8/1	Ruby Walsh	Willie Mullins	£105,500
4	Walk In The Mill	9	10-04	25/1	James Best	Robert Walford	£52,700
5	Anibale Fly	9	11-10	10/1	Mark Walsh	Tony Martin	£26,500
6	One For Arthur	10	11-00	20/1	Derek Fox	Lucinda Russell	£13,200
7	Regal Encore	11	10-12	66/1	Jonathan Burke	Anthony Honeyball	£6,800
8	Singlefarmpayment	9	10-06	50/1	Paddy Brennan	Tom George	£3,600
9	Outlander	11	11-04	66/1	James Bowen	Richard Spencer	£2,000
10	Valseur Lido	10	10-06	66/1	Rachael Blackmore	Henry de Bromhead	£1,000
11	Livelovelaugh	9	10-04	25/1	David Mullins	Willie Mullins	
12	A Toi Phil	9	10-11	50/1	Denis O'Regan	Gordon Elliott	
13	Bless The Wings	14	10-03	50/1	Robert Dunne	Gordon Elliott	
14	Ultragold	11	10-07	50/1	Tom O'Brien	Colin Tizzard	
15	Vieux Lion Rouge	10	10-06	66/1	Tom Scudamore	David Pipe	
16	Captain Redbeard	10	10-03	66/1	Sam Coltherd	Stuart Coltherd	
17	Folsom Blue	12	10-04	66/1	Luke Dempsey	Gordon Elliott	
18	Valtor	10	11-06	66/1	Daryl Jacob	Nicky Henderson	
19	Don Poli	10	11-03	66/1	Patrick Mullins (Note: amateur jockey)	Philip Kirby	

== Non-finishers ==
Fence	Horse	Jockey	SP	Fate
1st	Up For Review	David Mullins		Brought down
	Vintage Clouds	Danny Cook		Fell
11th (Open Ditch)	Monbeg Notorious	Sean Bowen		Pulled Up
19th (Open Ditch)	General Principle	J J Slevin		Fell
	Rock The Kasbah	Richard Johnson		Brought Down
	Blow By Blow	Andrew Ring		Pulled Up
	Jury Duty	Robbie Power		Unseated Rider
21st	Minella Rocco	Richie McLernon		Pulled Up
25th (Valentine's Brook)	Step Back	Nico de Boinville		Pulled Up
26th	Ballyoptic	Thomas Bellamy		Fell
27th (Open Ditch)	Pleasant Company	Paul Townend		Unseated Rider
	Lake View Lad	Henry Brooke		Pulled Up
28th	Just A Par	Aidan Coleman		Pulled Up
	Warriors Tale	Harry Cobden		Pulled Up
	Noble Endeavor	Mark Enright		Pulled Up
	Ramses Des Teille	David Noonan		Pulled Up
29th	Mala Beach	Mr. Jamie Codd		Pulled Up
	Tea For Two	Lizzie Kelly		Pulled Up
	Joe Farrell	Adam Wedge		Pulled Up
	Go Conquer	Sam Twiston-Davies		Pulled Up
	Dounikos	Jack Kennedy		Pulled Up

== Broadcasting and media ==
Magic Of Light blunders and leaves Tiger Roll two lengths clear, and Davy Russell is led to breathe on him as Tiger Roll breezes towards the Elbow. Magic Of Light, Rathvinden, Walk In The Mill, One For Arthur then Anibale Fly and Regal Encore. But off up the run-in, Tiger Roll looks to the elbow, Magic Of Light and Rathvinden trying to rally. Tiger Roll's been out in front for a while, he's got a five length lead. 150 yards between himself and a place in history! Tiger Roll from Magic Of Light, Tiger Roll keeping up the gallop! Up towards the line, back to back nationals, the first since Red Rum! An Aintree great!

— ITV lead commentator Richard Hoiles describes the climax of the race.

As the Grand National is accorded the status of an event of national interest in the United Kingdom and is listed on the Ofcom Code on Sports and Other Listed and Designated Events, it must be shown on free-to-air terrestrial television in the UK. The race was broadcast live on TV by ITV, in the third year of its four-year deal as the exclusive terrestrial broadcaster of horse racing in the UK.

The coverage was co-anchored by Ed Chamberlin and Francesca Cumani. Analysis was provided by former Grand National winning jockeys Sir Anthony McCoy and Mick Fitzgerald, along with leading female jockey Bryony Frost, who had been ruled out of competing through injury, and veteran racing broadcaster Brough Scott. Reports were provided by Oli Bell, Alice Plunkett, Rishi Persad and Luke Harvey with updates from the betting ring by Brian Gleeson and Matt Chapman and Chris Hughes covering viewers comments on social media. The commentary team was Mark Johnson, Ian Bartlett and Richard Hoiles. Following the race, Bell, Fitzgerald and Chapman guided viewers on a fence-by-fence re-run of the race - due to the fatal injury sustained to Up For Review, the first fence was omitted from the re-run broadcast.

== See also ==
- Horse racing in Great Britain
- List of British National Hunt races
