= Liberthine Mares' Chase =

Steeplechase horse race in Britain

Liberthine Mares' Chase (Mrs Paddy Power Mares' Chase)
- Class: Grade 2
- Location: Cheltenham Racecourse; Cheltenham, England
- Race type: Steeplechase
- Sponsor: Paddy Power
- Website: Cheltenham

Race information
- Distance: 2m 4f 127y (4,139 metres)
- Surface: Turf
- Track: Left-handed
- Qualification: Five-years-old and up mares
- Weight: 11 st 0 lb (5yo); 11 st 2 lb (6yo+)
- Purse: £120,000 (2023); 1st: £67,524

Liberthine Mares' Chase
2026
Dinoblue	Only By Night	Panic Attack

Previous years
2025
Dinoblue	Brides Hill	Shecouldbeanything
2024
Limerick Lace	Dinoblue	Marsh Wren
2023
Impervious	Allegorie De Vassy	Pink Legend
2022
Elimay	Pink Legend	Scarlet And Dove
2021
Colreevy	Elimay	Shattered Love

The Liberthine Mares' Chase, currently run as the Mrs Paddy Power Mares' Chase, is a Grade 2 National Hunt chase in Great Britain which is open to mares aged five years or older. It is run on the New Course at Cheltenham over a distance of about 2 miles and 4½ furlongs (2 miles 4 furlongs and 127 yards, or 4,139 metres), and during its running there are seventeen fences to be jumped. It is scheduled to take place each year during the Cheltenham Festival in March.

The race was run for the first time in 2021 and replaced the Centenary Novices' Handicap Chase on the Cheltenham Festival programme.

== Records ==
Most successful horse (2 wins):

- Dinoblue - (2025, 2026)

Leading jockey (3 wins):

- Mark Walsh - Elimay (2022), Dinoblue (2025, 2026)

Leading trainer (4 wins):

- Willie Mullins – Colreevy (2021), Elimay (2022), Dinoblue (2025, 2026)

== Winners ==
Year	Winner	Age	Jockey	Trainer
2021	Colreevy	8	Paul Townend	Willie Mullins
2022	Elimay	8	Mark Walsh	Willie Mullins
2023	Impervious	7	Brian Hayes	Colm Murphy
2024	Limerick Lace	7	Keith Donoghue	Gavin Cromwell
2025	Dinoblue	8	Mark Walsh	Willie Mullins
2026	Dinoblue	9	Mark Walsh	Willie Mullins

== See also ==
- Horse racing in Great Britain
- List of British National Hunt races
