= Balthazar King =

Irish-bred Thoroughbred racehorse

- Sire: King's Theatre
- Grandsire: Sadler's Wells
- Dam: Afdala
- Damsire: Hernando
- Sex: Gelding
- Foaled: 12 February 2004
- Country: Ireland
- Colour: Bay
- Breeder: Sunnyhill Stud
- Owner: The Brushmakers
- Trainer: Philip Hobbs
- Record: 45: 16, 8, 1
- Earnings: £489,812

Balthazar King (foaled February 12, 2004) is a Bay Irish-bred, British-trained Thoroughbred racehorse. He is out of Afdala by King's Theatre. In 2015 his record stands at 16 wins, and 9 places from 45 races. He came runner up to Pineau De Re in the 2014 running of the Grand National at Aintree Racecourse.

He is currently owned by The Bushmakers and trained by P J Hobbs from his yard in Minehead, Somerset.

He has 8 wins around Cheltenham Racecourse, including the Cross Country Handicap Chase twice.

== Career ==
Balthazar King's first race was a National Hunt Flat race on 28 March 2008 at Newbury Racecourse in that race he finished 6 out of the 17 horses involved. He went on to race in two more NHF races, winning one and finishing 11th out of 15 in the other. His next 16 starts were all over hurdles, over a period of a year and a half. He won 2 of his races and placed in a further 6. On 24 September 2010 he moved on to his first National Hunt Chase race, at Worcester Racecourse and won on his first attempt. He went on to win 3 of his next 6 races over fences and placed in one other. During this period he also won around Cheltenham.

Balthazar King has a record of 8 wins, and 4 places from 17 races at Cheltenham Racecourse. He first raced at the track on 15 November 2009, finishing second. He won on 13 April 2011, at the 7th time racing. His wins at Cheltenham include two Cross Country Handicap Chases worth £50,000 each.

== Grand National 2014 ==
Balthazar King went into the race at Aintree Racecourse. He was jockeyed by Richard Johnson, who himself is yet to win the Grand National. Balthazar King finished second, a distance of 5 lengths behind the winner Pineau De Re and in doing so he won £211,100.

== Grand National 2015 ==
Balthazar King ran in the Grand National, but took a fall on the Canal turn and injured his ribs. He was sent to Liverpool Equine Hospital to recover.

== Pedigree ==
Pedigree of Balthazar King (IRE), bay gelding, 2004
Sire King's Theatre (IRE) 1991	Sadler's Wells (USA); 1981	Northern Dancer	Nearctic
Sire King's Theatre (IRE) 1991	Sadler's Wells (USA); 1981	Northern Dancer	Natalma
Sire King's Theatre (IRE) 1991	Sadler's Wells (USA); 1981	Fairy Bridge	Bold Reason
Sire King's Theatre (IRE) 1991	Sadler's Wells (USA); 1981	Fairy Bridge	Special
Sire King's Theatre (IRE) 1991	Regal Beauty (USA); 1981	Princely Native	Raise A Native
Sire King's Theatre (IRE) 1991	Regal Beauty (USA); 1981	Princely Native	Charlo
Sire King's Theatre (IRE) 1991	Regal Beauty (USA); 1981	Dennis Belle	Crafty Admiral
Sire King's Theatre (IRE) 1991	Regal Beauty (USA); 1981	Dennis Belle	Evasion
Dam Afdala (IRE) 1999	Hernando (FR); 1990	Nininski	Nijinsky
Dam Afdala (IRE) 1999	Hernando (FR); 1990	Nininski	Virginia Hills
Dam Afdala (IRE) 1999	Hernando (FR); 1990	Whakilyric	Miswaki
Dam Afdala (IRE) 1999	Hernando (FR); 1990	Whakilyric	Lyrism
Dam Afdala (IRE) 1999	Afasara (FR); 1988	Shardari	Top Ville
Dam Afdala (IRE) 1999	Afasara (FR); 1988	Shardari	Sharmada
Dam Afdala (IRE) 1999	Afasara (FR); 1988	Afeefa	Lyphard
Dam Afdala (IRE) 1999	Afasara (FR); 1988	Afeefa	Afrique
