= Reynoldstown Novices' Chase =

Steeplechase horse race in Britain

Reynoldstown Novices' Chase
2026
The Jukebox Kid	Western Knight	Crest Of Fortune

Previous years
2025
The Changing Man	Leave Of Absence	Peaky Boy
2024
Henry's Friend	Kilbeg King	Apple Away
2023
Oscar Elite	Bold Endeavour	Kinondo Kwetu
2022
Does He Know	Doyen Breed	Annual Invictus
2021
Remastered	Demachine	Kalooki

2020-2011
2020
Copperhead	Two For Gold	Danny Whizzbang
2019
Mister Malarky	Now Mcginty	Yalltari
2018
Black Corton	Ms Parfois	Mount Mews
2017
Bigbadjohn	Flintham	Fletchers Flyer
2016
Vyta Du Roc	Minella Rocco	Le Mercurey
2015
Ainsi Fideles	Deputy Dan	Virak
2014
O'Faolains Boy	Many Clouds	Third Intention
2013
Rocky Creek	Houblon Des Obeaux	Tour Des Champs
2012
Invictus	Bobs Worth	Alfie Spinner
2011
Master of the Hall	Billie Magern	The Minack

2010-2001
2010
Burton Port	Knockara Beau	Diablo
2009
Carruthers	Ballyfitz	Turkish Surprise
2008
Albertas Run	Air Force One	Battlecry
2007
Gungadu	Wee Robbie	Jaunty Times
2006
Montgermont	Bob Bob Bobbin	Idle Talk
2005
Distant Thunder	Persian Waters	Dungarvans Choice
2004
Our Vic	Rosslea	Double Honour
2003
Keen Leader	Whereareyounow	Only two finished
2002
Jimmy Tennis	Father McCarten	High Cotton
2001
Bacchanal	Bindaree	Mighty Kilcash

2000-1991
2000
Beau	Good Lord Murphy	Browjoshy
1999
Lord of the River	Collier Bay	Andsuephi
1998
The Toiseach	Mahler	Kilmington
1997
Djeddah	Dromhana	Only two finished
1996
Mr Mulligan	Nahthen Lad	Major Summit
1995
Sweet Duke	Smith's Band	Crank Shaft
1994
One Man	Mailcom	Spikey
1993
Capability Brown	Dakyns Boy	Channels Gate
1992
Danny Harrold	Jodami	Major Inquiry

1990-1988
1990
Royal Athlete	Last House	Carrick Hill Lad
1989
Vulgan Warrior	Slalom	Dinny Walsh
1988
Kissane	The West Awake	Sporting Mariner

The Reynoldstown Novices' Chase is a Grade 2 National Hunt steeplechase in Great Britain which is open to horses aged five years or older. It is run at Ascot over a distance of about 3 miles (2 miles, 7 furlongs and 180 yards, or 4,790 metres), and during its running there are twenty fences to be jumped. The race is for novice chasers, and it is scheduled to take place each year in February.

The event is named in honour of the racehorse Reynoldstown, a dual winner of the Grand National in the 1930s. The Reynoldstown Novices' Chase serves as a trial for the RSA Insurance Novices' Chase in March. The last horse to win both races in the same year was O'Faolains Boy in 2014. The race is currently sponsored by Sodexo.

== Winners ==
Year	Winner	Age	Jockey	Trainer
1971	Orient War	8	Stan Mellor	Fulke Walwyn
1972	Colebridge	8	E Wright	Jim Dreaper (Ir)
1973	Killiney	7	Richard Pitman	Fred Winter
1974	Abandoned due to waterlogging			
1975	Brown Lad	9	Tommy Carberry	Jim Dreaper (Ir)
1976	Ghost Writer	9	Bill Smith	Fulke Walwyn
1977	Lanzarote	9	John Francome	Fred Winter
1978	Abandoned due to frost			
1979	Abandoned due to snow			
1980	Little Owl	6	Jonjo O'Neill	Peter Easterby
1981	Easter Eel	10	John Francome	Fred Winter
1982	Richdee	6	Colin Hawkins	Neville Crump
1983	Abandoned due to frost			
1984	Duke of Milan	7	Steve Smith Eccles	Nick Gaselee
1985	Drumadowney	7	Hywel Davies	Tim Forster
1986	Bolands Cross	7	Peter Scudamore	Nick Gaselee
1987	Tawridge	7	Steve Knight	Andrew Turnell
1988	Kissane	7	Tom Morgan	John Edwards
1989	Vulgan Warrior	7	Jamie Osborne	Simon Christian
1990	Royal Athlete	7	Mark Pitman	Jenny Pitman
1991	Abandoned due to frost			
1992	Danny Harrold	8	Mark Pitman	Jenny Pitman
1993	Capability Brown	6	Peter Scudamore	Martin Pipe
1994	One Man	6	Neale Doughty	Gordon W. Richards
1995	Sweet Duke	8	Tom Jenks	Nigel Twiston-Davies
1996	Mr Mulligan	8	Richard Johnson	Noel Chance
1997	Djeddah	6	Adam Kondrat	François Doumen
1998	The Toiseach	7	Tony Dobbin	James Fanshawe
1999	Lord of the River	7	Jamie Osborne	Oliver Sherwood
2000	Beau	7	Carl Llewellyn	Nigel Twiston-Davies
2001	Bacchanal	7	Mick Fitzgerald	Nicky Henderson
2002	Jimmy Tennis	5	Norman Williamson	Venetia Williams
2003	Keen Leader	7	Liam Cooper	Jonjo O'Neill
2004	Our Vic	6	Timmy Murphy	Martin Pipe
2005 (Note: The 2005 and 2006 editions took place at Lingfield Park as Ascot was closed for redevelopment)	Distant Thunder	7	Andrew Thornton	Robert Alner
2006	Montgermont	6	Mark Bradburne	Lavinia Taylor
2007	Gungadu	7	Ruby Walsh	Paul Nicholls
2008	Albertas Run	7	Ruby Walsh	Jonjo O'Neill
2009	Carruthers	6	Mattie Batchelor	Mark Bradstock
2010	Burton Port	6	Barry Geraghty	Nicky Henderson
2011	Master of the Hall	7	Barry Geraghty	Nicky Henderson
2012	Invictus	6	Robert Thornton	Alan King
2013	Rocky Creek	7	Ruby Walsh	Paul Nicholls
2014	O'Faolains Boy	7	Barry Geraghty	Rebecca Curtis
2015	Ainsi Fideles	5	Tom Scudamore	David Pipe
2016	Vyta Du Roc	7	Daryl Jacob	Nicky Henderson
2017	Bigbadjohn	8	Jonathan Moore	Rebecca Curtis
2018	Black Corton	7	Bryony Frost	Paul Nicholls
2019	Mister Malarky	6	Robbie Power	Colin Tizzard
2020	Copperhead	6	Jonjo O’Neill Jr	Colin Tizzard
2021	Remastered	8	Tom Scudamore	David Pipe
2022	Does He Know	7	David Bass	Kim Bailey
2023	Oscar Elite	8	Harry Cobden	Joe Tizzard
2024	Henry's Friend	7	Ben Jones	Ben Pauling
2025	The Changing Man	8	Brendan Powell	Joe Tizzard
2026	The Jukebox Kid	7	Ben Jones	Ben Pauling

== See also ==
- Horse racing in Great Britain
- List of British National Hunt races
