= Tillingdale =

Irish company

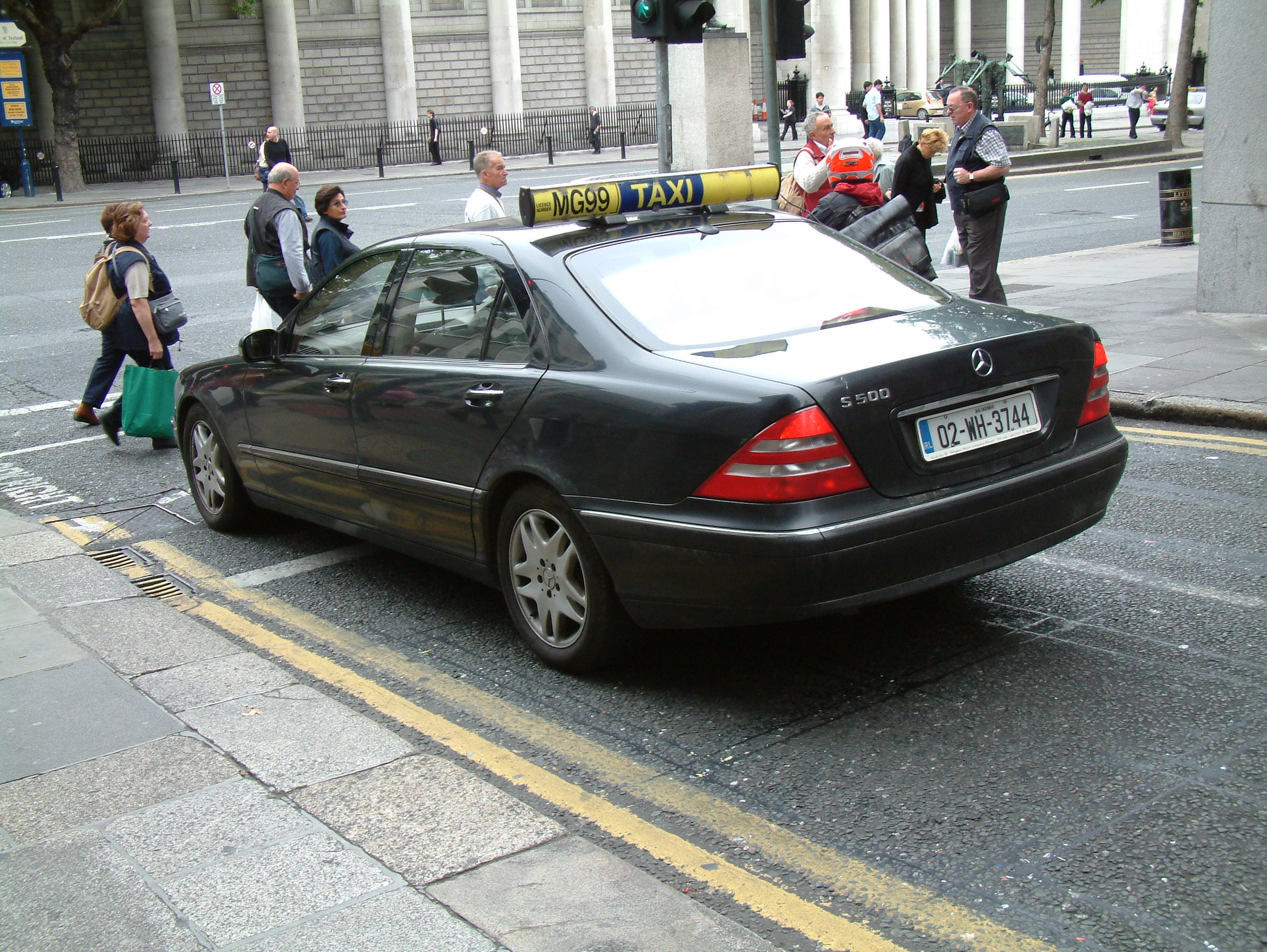
Michael O'Leary's personal Mercedes, operated by O'Leary Cabs and complete with "for hire" roof bar

Tillingdale, originally Tillingdale Limited, is an Irish company based in Mullingar, Ireland. It was founded in 2000 to provide furniture management and horse breeding services under the name Gigginstown House Stud. Since 2003, Tillingdale has also operated under the name O'Leary Cabs, a provider of taxicab services.

The company is owned entirely by Michael O'Leary, CEO of the Irish airline Ryanair. During 2004, the company made a profit of approximately €500,000. In 2013 the company was converted from a limited company to a privately owned unlimited company, meaning that public accounts no longer needed to be filed.

== Horse racing ==
The stud farm operation owned the 2006 Cheltenham Gold Cup winning horse War Of Attrition.

Gigginstown House was built by architect John Skipton Mulvany (1813–1870) for Elizabeth Busby between 1853 and 1855.

== Taxi services ==
The company owns a 2007–Mercedes-Benz S-Class taxi, with Mullingar hackney carriage licence MG99 purchased on a yearly basis from Westmeath County Council for upwards of €6,000. The vehicle has a taxi meter fitted and is allowed to use bus lanes within Dublin.

The Mercedes taxi primarily operates between Ryanair's headquarters at Dublin Airport, and Michael O'Leary's home in Mullingar—a fare of around €86 (£82) each way. During the year prior to 2008, these charges amounted to €70,890 and had risen to €96,010 for the year 2009.

At the end of 2011, the single-owner Mercedes S500L was put up for sale with an asking price of €20,000, under the description of "Ireland's most famous taxi" and showing 275,000 kilometres on the odometer. The vehicle owned by Tillingdale had registration number 07D12245 and carried taxi plate number 14365.

The current vehicle owned and operated by Tillingdale Unlimited has registration number 241D41728 and taxi plate number T14365.
