= Glenfarclas distillery =

Speyside whisky distillery

Coordinates: 57°25′37.2″N 3°18′58.9″W

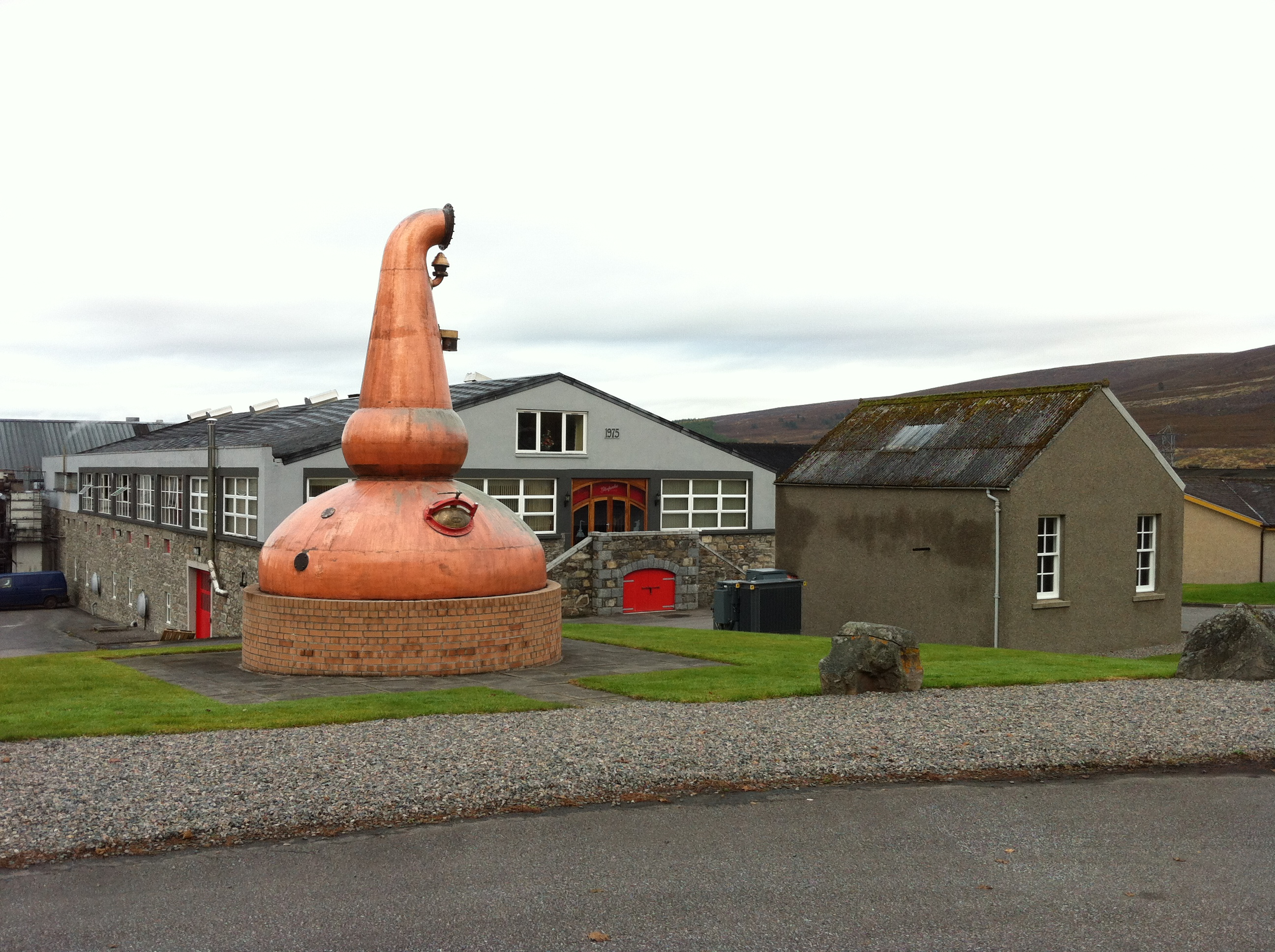

Region: Speyside
- Owner: J. & G. Grant
- Founded: 1836
- Status: Active
- Water source: Ben Rinnes
- No. of stills: 3 wash stills (29,600 L); 3 spirit stills (25,000 L)
- Capacity: 4,000,000 litres

Glenfarclas distillery is a Speyside whisky distillery in Ballindalloch, Scotland. The distillery is owned and run by the Grant family.

== History ==
There is evidence that the distillery first started operations sometime before 1791. The distillery was first granted a licence in 1836 when it was run by Robert Hay. On 8 June 1865 it was bought by John Grant and is still owned and run by his descendants, making it truly independent.

John Grant sent his son George G. Grant to run the operations at Glenfarclas. In 1890, on the death of George G. Grant, his widow Elsie took over the licence for the distillery.

At some time over the following years, Elsie handed active management of the Distillery to her sons John and George. The Grants formed a partnership with Pattisons Ltd in August 1896 at the height of the whisky boom. After the crash that followed, the Grants resumed full ownership of the distillery. John retired due to ill health in 1913 and George became sole proprietor. In 1947 Glenfarclas became a private limited company, owned by George's sons, George S. Grant and John P. Grant.

John L.S. Grant, who joined Glenfarclas in 1973, is the current chairman. The company was named Distiller of the Year by Whisky Magazine in 2006, 2020 and 2023 .

Since 2006 Glenfarclas has been distributed in the UK by Pol Roger Ltd. In 2008 the company began sponsoring horseracing with the Glenfarclas Cross Country Handicap Chase at Cheltenham. In 2011, the 40-year-old 46% vol. expression was named "Scotch Whisky Single Malt of the Year" in the 17th Annual Malt Advocate Whisky Awards. In May 2022, thieves broke into the distillery's visitor center and stole more than £100,000 worth of whisky.

On 3 August 2021, the distillery was given approval to construct two whisky warehouses.

== Production ==
The distillery has six stills which are the largest on Speyside and are heated directly by gas burners.

The distillery has a production capacity of around 4 million litres of spirit per year. Normally four stills are used for production with two kept in reserve.

The distillery has approximately 68,000 casks maturing on site, in traditional dunnage warehouses, with stock from every year from 1953 to the current year. Glenfarclas produce a traditional Highland malt with a heavy sherry influence.

== Proprietary bottlings ==
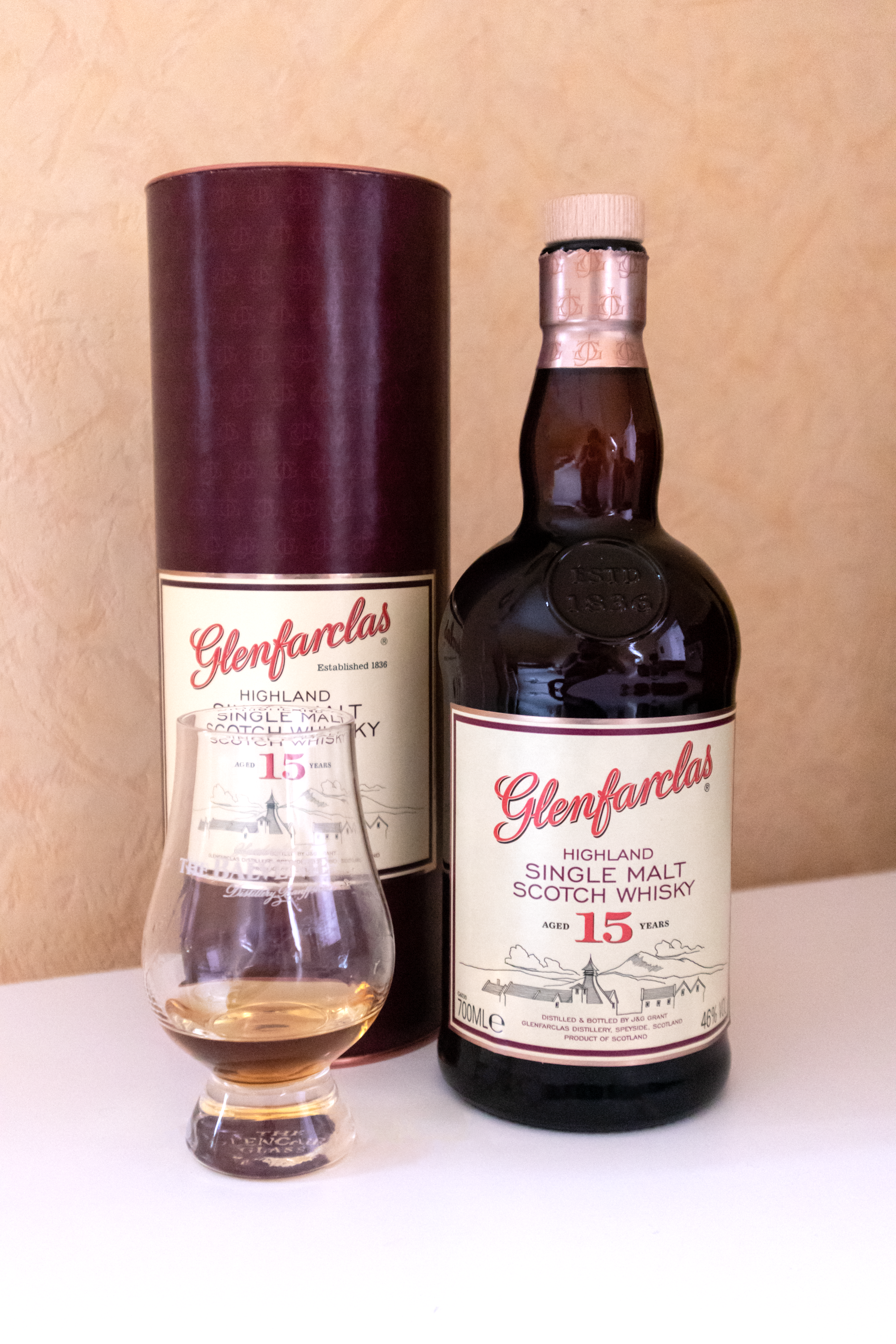
A bottle of a fifteen-year-old Glenfarclas

Glenfarclas is produced in the following proprietary bottlings:

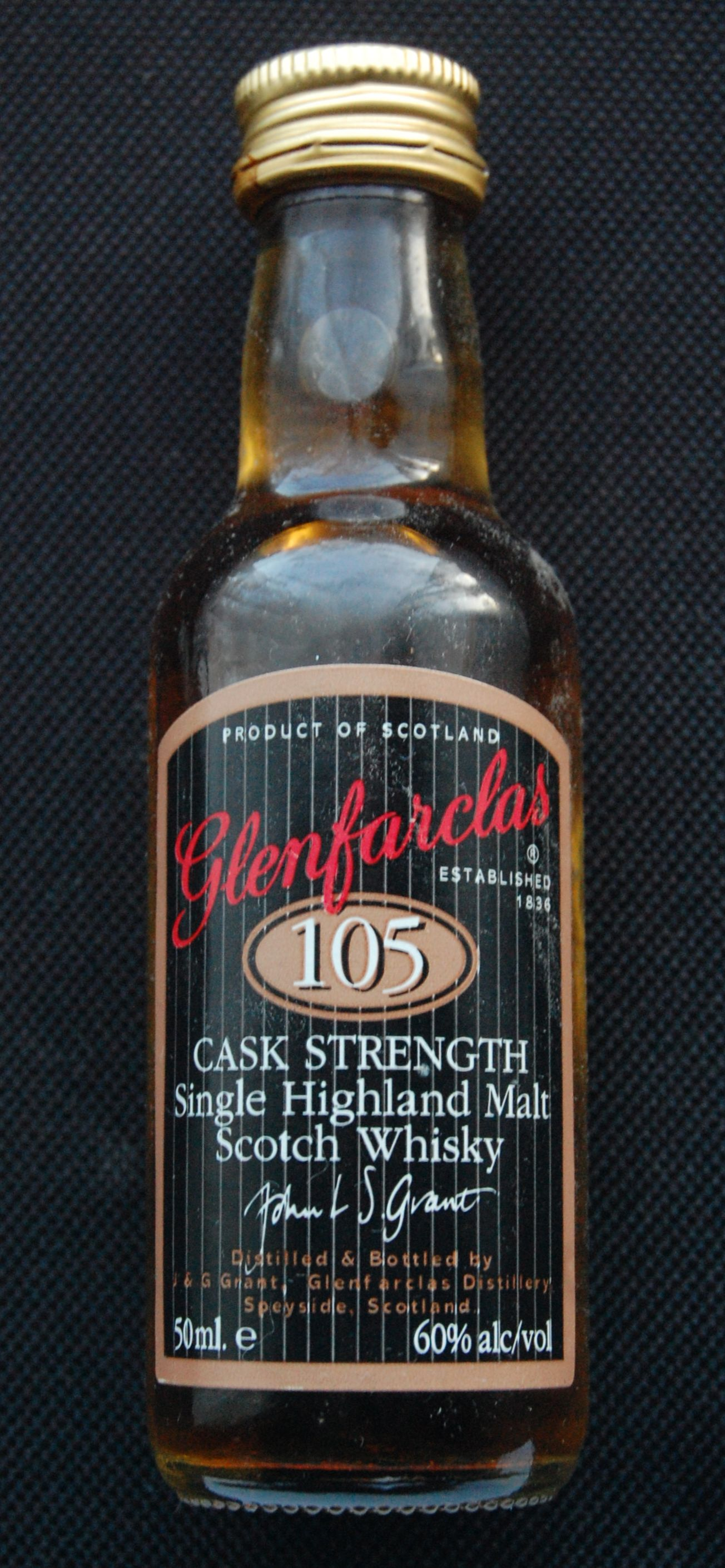
A miniature (50ml) of Glenfarclas 105. The label bears the facsimile signature of John L.S. Grant.

- 8-year-old 40% ABV
- 10-year-old 40% ABV
- 12-year-old 43% ABV
- 15-year-old 46% ABV
- 17-year-old 43% ABV
- 21-year-old 43% ABV (bottling currently suspended)
- 25-year-old 43% ABV
- 30-year-old 43% ABV
- 40-year-old 46% ABV
- 105 (Cask Strength) 60% ABV

In 2007 Glenfarclas launched The Family Casks, a collection of 43 single cask bottlings, with one from every year from 1952 to 1994. This collection now extends to 2007, but the distillery no longer has stock of casks from 1952 and 1953.

In June 2015, Glenfarclas released a limited edition bottling called the £511.19s.0d Family Reserve. This was launched to mark 150 years of the Grant Family owning the distillery. The name of this bottling references the price John Grant paid for the distillery in 1865. The bottle is sold with a copy of the original bill of sale for the distillery.

Also in 2015, Glenfarclas released a limited edition line of their 60-year-old bottle. Glenfarclas confirmed that there were only 360 bottles released globally.

== Visitor centre ==
Glenfarclas was one of the first distilleries to open a visitor centre in 1973. Today the visitor centre is open on weekdays throughout the year and Saturdays from July to September.

The visitor centre includes the "Ship's Room", a tasting room, with panelling from the RMS Empress of Australia. This ship was of historical importance for ferrying the last British troops home from Bombay, after they had symbolically passed through the Gateway of India, bringing an end to over two centuries of British imperial rule in India.

== See also ==
- List of whisky brands
- List of distilleries in Scotland
- Glenfarclas Cross Country Chase
