= Glenfarclas Cross Country Chase =

Steeplechase horse race in Britain

Glenfarclas Cross Country Handicap Chase
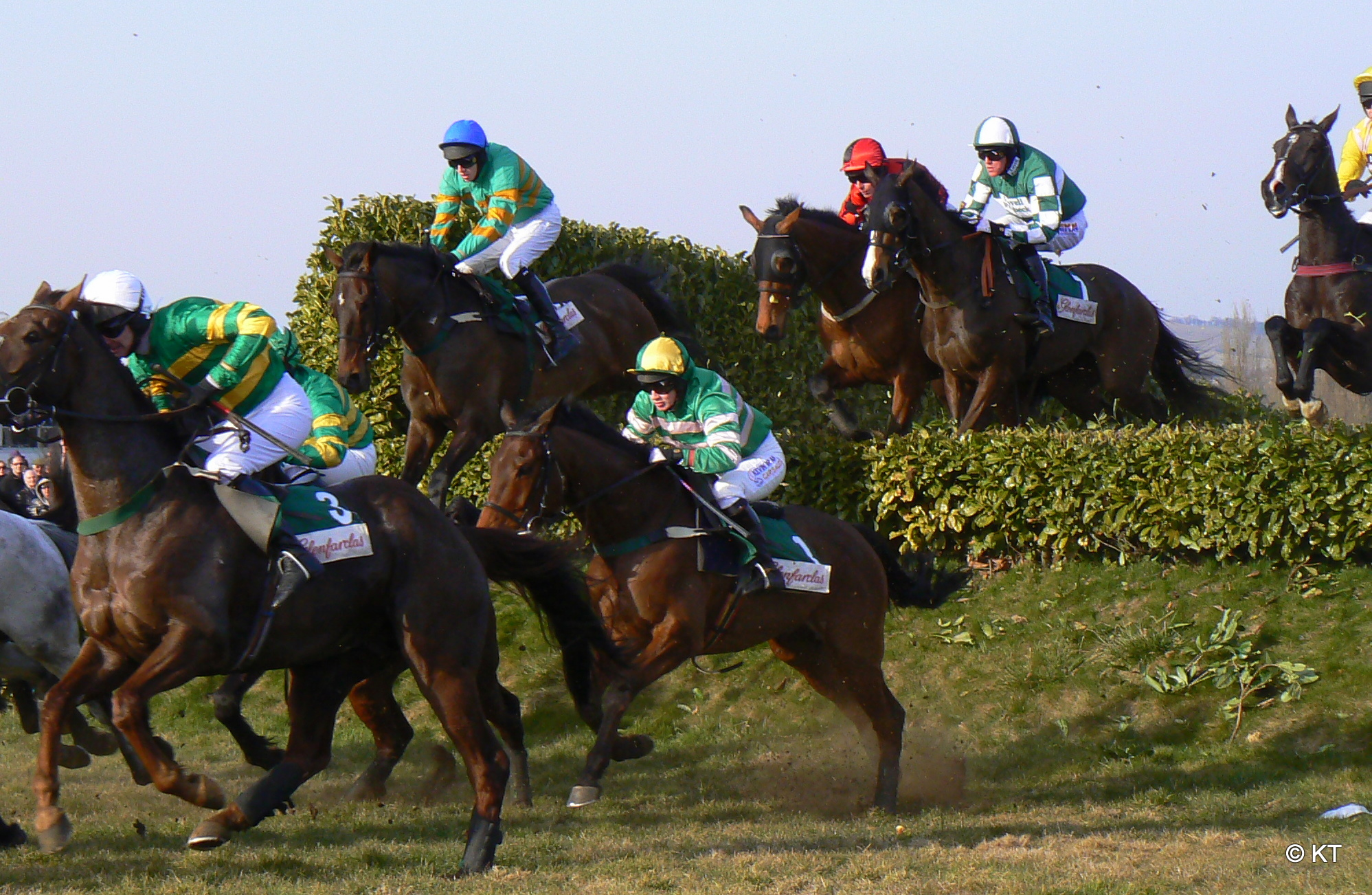
- The 2010 running
- Class: Ungraded
- Location: Cheltenham Racecourse; Cheltenham, England
- Inaugurated: 2005
- Race type: steeplechase
- Sponsor: Glenfarclas
- Website: Cheltenham

Race information
- Distance: 3m 5f 56y (6,069 metres)
- Surface: Turf
- Qualification: Five-years-old and up
- Weight: handicap
- Purse: £75,000 (2025); 1st: £39,023

Glenfarclas Cross Country Chase
2026
Final Orders	Favori De Champdou	Vanillier

Previous years
2025
Stumptown	Latenightpass	Vanillier
2023
Delta Work	Galvin	Franco De Port
2022
Delta Work	Tiger Roll	Plan Of Attack
2021
Tiger Roll	Easysland	Some Neck

2020-2011
2020
Easysland	Tiger Roll	Out Sam
2019
Tiger Roll	Josies Orders	Urgent De Gregaine
2018
Tiger Roll	Urgent De Gregaine	The Last Samuri
2017
Cause of Causes	Bless The Wings	Cantlow
2016
Josies Orders	Bless The Wings	Quantitativeeasing
2015
Rivage D'Or	Any Currency	Uncle Junior
2014
Balthazar King	Any Currency	Big Shu
2013
Big Shu	Shakervilz	Outlaw Pete
2012
Balthazar King	A New Story	Wedger Pardy
2011
Sizing Australia	Garde Champetre	A New Story

2010-2005
2010
A New Story	L'Ami	Lacdoudal
2009
Garde Champetre	L'Ami	Drombeag
2008
Garde Champetre	Native Jack	A New Story
2007
Heads Onthe Ground	Silver Birch	Le Duc
2006
Native Jack	Spot Thedifference	Buailtes And Fadas
2005
Spot Thedifference	Luzcadou	Mrs Be

The Glenfarclas Cross Country Chase is a National Hunt steeplechase in Great Britain which is open to horses aged five years or older. It is run on the Cross-Country Course at Cheltenham over a distance of about 3 miles and 5½ furlongs (3 miles 5 furlongs and 56 yards, or 5,885 metres), and during its running there are thirty-two obstacles to be cleared. It was originally run as a handicap race before being changed to a conditions race from the 2016 running, and it is scheduled to take place each year on the second day of the Cheltenham Festival in March. In 2025, the race reverted to being run as a handicap.

The event was established when a fourth day was added to the Cheltenham Festival in 2005. It is now one of three cross-country chases held at Cheltenham – the others take place in November and December. All three were originally sponsored by Sporting Index, and in the 2007–08 season they were backed by BGC. The whisky distillery Glenfarclas began supporting the series in 2008–09.

== Records ==
Most successful horse (3 wins):

- Tiger Roll - 2018, 2019, 2021

Leading jockey (5 wins):

- Keith Donoghue - Tiger Roll (2018, 2019, 2021), Delta Work (2023), Stumptown (2025)

Leading trainer (5 wins):

- Enda Bolger – Spot Thedifference (2005), Heads Onthe Ground (2007), Garde Champetre (2008, 2009), Josies Orders (2016)
- Gordon Elliott- Cause of Causes (2017), Tiger Roll (2018, 2019), Delta Work (2022, 2023)

== Winners ==
- Weights given in stones and pounds.

Year	Winner	Age	Weight	Jockey	Trainer
2005	Spot Thedifference	12	11–12	JT McNamara (Note: amateur jockey)	Enda Bolger
2006	Native Jack	12	10-08	Davy Russell	Philip Rothwell
2007	Heads Onthe Ground	10	10-02	Nina Carberry	Enda Bolger
2008	Garde Champetre	9	10–13	Nina Carberry	Enda Bolger
2009	Garde Champetre	10	11–12	Nina Carberry	Enda Bolger
2010	A New Story	12	09-07	Adrian Heskin	Michael Hourigan
2011	Sizing Australia	9	10-09	Andrew Lynch	Henry De Bromhead
2012	Balthazar King	8	10-09	Richard Johnson	Philip Hobbs
2013	Big Shu	8	10-05	Barry Cash	Peter Maher
2014	Balthazar King	10	11–12	Richard Johnson	Philip Hobbs
2015	Rivage d'Or	10	10-10	Davy Russell	Tony Martin
2016	Josies Orders (Note: Any Currency finished first in 2016 but was disqualified after a banned substance was detected in a post-race urine test)	8	11-04	Nina Carberry	Enda Bolger
2017	Cause of Causes	9	11-04	Jamie Codd	Gordon Elliott
2018	Tiger Roll	8	11-04	Keith Donoghue	Gordon Elliott
2019	Tiger Roll	9	11-04	Keith Donoghue	Gordon Elliott
2020	Easysland	6	11-04	Jonathan Plouganou	David Cottin
2021	Tiger Roll	11	11-04	Keith Donoghue	Denise Foster
2022	Delta Work	9	11-04	Jack Kennedy	Gordon Elliott
2023	Delta Work	10	11-07	Keith Donoghue	Gordon Elliott
	no race 2024 (Note: The 2024 race was abandoned because of a waterlogged track)
2025	Stumptown	8	11-10	Keith Donoghue	Gavin Cromwell
2026	Final Orders	10	10-09	Conor Stone-Walsh	Gavin Cromwell

== See also ==
- Horse racing in Great Britain
- List of British National Hunt races
- Recurring sporting events established in 2005 – included under its original title, Sporting Index Cross Country H'cap Chase.
