= Michael O'Leary (businessman) =

Irish businessman and CEO of Ryanair

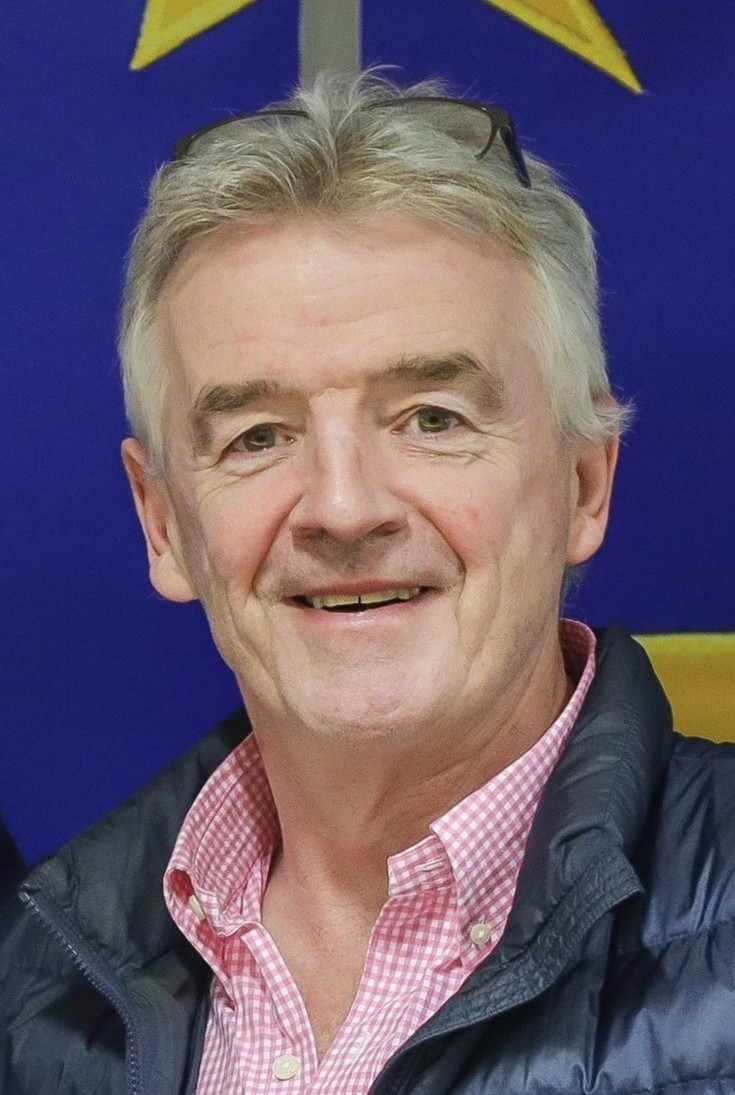
- O'Leary in January 2025
- Born: Michael Kevin O'Leary; 20 March 1961 (age 65); Castlemagner, County Cork, Ireland
- Education: Clongowes Wood College, Trinity College Dublin
- Occupation: Businessman
- Known for: CEO of Ryanair
- Spouse: Anita Farrell (m. 2003)
- Children: Four

Michael Kevin O'Leary (born 20 March 1961) is an Irish billionaire businessman who is the group CEO of Ryanair. He is one of Ireland's wealthiest businesspeople.

== Early life ==
Michael Kevin O'Leary was born in Castlemagner, County Cork, Ireland, on 20 March 1961, the second child of Gerarda and Timothy "Ted" O'Leary. He grew up near Mullingar, County Westmeath. His father was the part-owner of a textile factory. He was educated at Clongowes Wood College near Clane, County Kildare, before studying business and economics at Trinity College Dublin. After graduating in 1982, he worked as a trainee with Stokes Kennedy Crowley (which subsequently joined Peat Marwick, later known as KPMG) and studied the Irish tax system. He left after two years in 1985, setting up profitable newsagents in the Terenure and Walkinstown areas of Dublin.

While at Stokes Kennedy Crowley, O'Leary had met Tony Ryan, head of Guinness Peat Aviation (GPA), a leasing company. Ryan was one of KPMG's clients and O'Leary advised Ryan on his personal income tax affairs. In 1988, Ryan hired O'Leary as his personal financial and tax advisor, where Ryan's main interest was in GPA.

== Ryanair career ==
O'Leary became chief financial officer of Ryanair in 1988, and then chief executive officer in 1994. His initial advice to Tony Ryan was to shut down the then-unprofitable airline.

Under O'Leary's management, Ryanair further developed the low-cost model originated by Southwest Airlines. O'Leary described the ancillary revenue model in a 2001 interview, saying "The other airlines are asking how they can put up fares. We are asking how we could get rid of them." The business model envisioned by O'Leary uses receipts from onboard shopping, internet gaming, car hire and hotel bookings to supplement the ticket revenue from selling airline seats. Savings are also made by negotiating discounts with airports for reduced landing fees. In many cases, regional airports have made no charges so as to secure flights that bring passengers and wealth into their area. The deregulation of Ireland's major airports and a transformation of traditional full-service airlines are among his demands.

As CEO of Ryanair, O'Leary developed a reputation for foul language and for making comments which he later contradicts. He is known for being outspoken in his public statements, and for sometimes resorting to personal attacks and foul language. He was reported to have been aggressive and hostile in dealings with a woman who was awarded free flights for life in 1988.

In 2002, O'Leary said that his company is against any long-haul transatlantic services: "The low-cost model only really works for short-haul flights. [...] If we started flying farther afield, we'd have to do something stupid like introducing what I call a 'rich class' to make it pay." However, while at the 2013 Paris Air Show, he said that he wanted to sell cheap flights from the U.S. to Europe for as low as 10 euros ($13) or $10, if conditions were right. He said that he needed a fleet of at least 30 twin-aisle aircraft and access to ports (e.g. major U.S. and European cities. In the airline industry there are so called slots or sometimes gates, often regulated by law, and without obtaining them it is impossible to have regular service to airports). Despite his claims in 2002, there were so called budget airlines in the past who serve long haul routes – for example Laker Airways flights from London to New York in the late 1970s or long-hauls at budget-fares on other continents like AirAsiaX in Malaysia and the Australian Jetstar Group.

In 2003, O'Leary purchased a taxi license plate for his Mercedes-Benz S-Class under the name O'Leary Cabs, enabling it to be classified as a taxi so that he could legally make use of Dublin's bus lanes to speed up his car journeys around the city. A press report suggested that since he had stopped driving his own taxi, he has employed a driver with full PSV licence. In 2005, the Irish transport minister expressed concern at this abuse by O'Leary and others.

In 2007, O'Leary was forced to retract a claim that Ryanair had cut emissions of carbon dioxide by half over the previous five years because the claim should have been that emissions "per passenger" had been cut by half. He has been reported to have impersonated a journalist in an attempt to find information passed on to a newspaper following a safety incident on a Ryanair flight. On occasion, he has apologised for personal attacks under threat of legal action. He has been criticised by a judge for lying, who said he was lucky not to be found guilty of contempt of court. He has also been criticised for dismissing concerns about climate change as "complete nonsense".

Reacting to the decision to close European airspace in April 2010 over worries about the volcanic ash plume from an erupting Icelandic volcano, O'Leary falsely said, "There was no ash cloud. It was mythical. It's become evident the airspace closure was completely unnecessary." One study concluded that serious structural damage to aircraft could have occurred if passenger planes had continued to fly.

In May 2014, O'Leary was highly critical of a 24-hour strike by Aer Lingus cabin crew. Aer Lingus, whose biggest shareholder at the time was Ryanair, had to cancel 200 flights and disrupt travel plans for 200,000 people. O'Leary accused Aer Lingus of "mismanagement" of its employee relations, called for the sacking of a board member, and said the striking employees should be punished by having their discount travel incentives withdrawn for a year.

Participants in the Bilderberg Meeting have stated that O'Leary was invited to attend the 2015 meeting. He also attended its 2017 meeting and June 2025 meeting.

In February 2020, O'Leary suggested that airport security should focus on single Muslim men and called obese passengers "monsters".

In June 2022, O'Leary defended Ryanair's use of an Afrikaans language test on South African nationals flying to the UK and Ireland. However, he later withdrew his comments amid widespread criticism of Ryanair's discriminatory policy. Notwithstanding the historical connotations of Afrikaans in South Africa during the Apartheid era, Afrikaans, along with English, is only one of the 11 official languages in South Africa.

In June 2022, Hungarian Prime Minister Viktor Orbán announced that the Hungarian government would introduce an 'extra profit tax' on banks and large private companies, including airlines. In response to the introduction of the tax, Ryanair has decided to retroactively pass the tax on to all passengers, increasing ticket prices by an extra €10 for intra-European destinations and €25 for non-European destinations. Michael O'Leary first called the idea of a new tax 'beyond stupid', and in a later interview, he called Economic Development Minister Márton Nagy a 'complete idiot', demanding local authorities to reverse the tax. After this, in a Euronews interview, O'Leary said the following about ministers Gergely Gulyás and Márton Nagy: "These two Hungarian ministers are like Dumb and Dumber in that Jim Carrey-film, if they think people will happily pay the extra tax and choose a more expensive airline overnight".

In 2010, O'Leary stated that he thought the scientific consensus on human-caused global warming was "horseshit" in an interview with the Irish Independent. In 2017, O'Leary dismissed climate change as "complete and utter rubbish". When asked whether climate change is happening, O'Leary replied that the cooling and warming had been "going on for years" and did not accept it was linked to carbon usage. In 2021, he was less dismissive and said "it is something that our customers and the people working here at Ryanair wants us to focus on and we tend to be very responsive.“ O'Leary subsequently claimed that “The green agenda is dead”.

O'Leary owns over 4% of Ryanair shares, worth over $1 billion. In 2025 he met a target to keep Ryanair's share price above €21 for 28 consecutive days. He will have the option to purchase 10 million shares at €11.12 each, if he stays with the company until the end of July 2028. The incentive scheme was agreed in 2019, and was due to expire in 2024 but was renewed in December 2022 until 2028.

In September 2026, O'Leary described rival airlines as "high-fare rapists", a statement for which he was criticised by Tánaiste Simon Harris and a number of sexual abuse survivors and campaigners. He doubled down on the language and defended it, saying that he would "happily offend" other airlines. He later apologised for these comments.

== Personal life ==
O'Leary married Anita Farrell on 5 September 2003 in Delvin, County Westmeath, with whom he has four children. They live in Gigginstown House near Delvin.

O'Leary breeds Aberdeen Angus cattle and horses at his Gigginstown House Stud. His horses War of Attrition, Don Cossack, Rule the World, and Tiger Roll have won races such as the Cheltenham Gold Cup, the 2016 Grand National, the 2018 Grand National, and the 2019 Grand National.

O'Leary has supported English football team Manchester City F.C. from an early age. He had the opportunity to buy a stake in the club in 2003, but believed the potential benefits did not outweigh the risk, and preferred instead to visit England to watch a few matches each season. He wore a Manchester City shirt when unveiling Ryanair's new destinations to and from Manchester Airport in 2011.
