= Ballinrobe Racecourse =

Horse racing venue in County Mayo, Ireland

Coordinates: 53.6377°N 9.2472°W

Ballinrobe Racecourse is a horse racing venue in Ballinrobe, County Mayo, Ireland. It is the only race course in County Mayo, and hosts both flat and national hunt events.
