= Cheltenham Festival =

British horse racing festival

Coordinates: 51°55′13″N 2°3′28″W

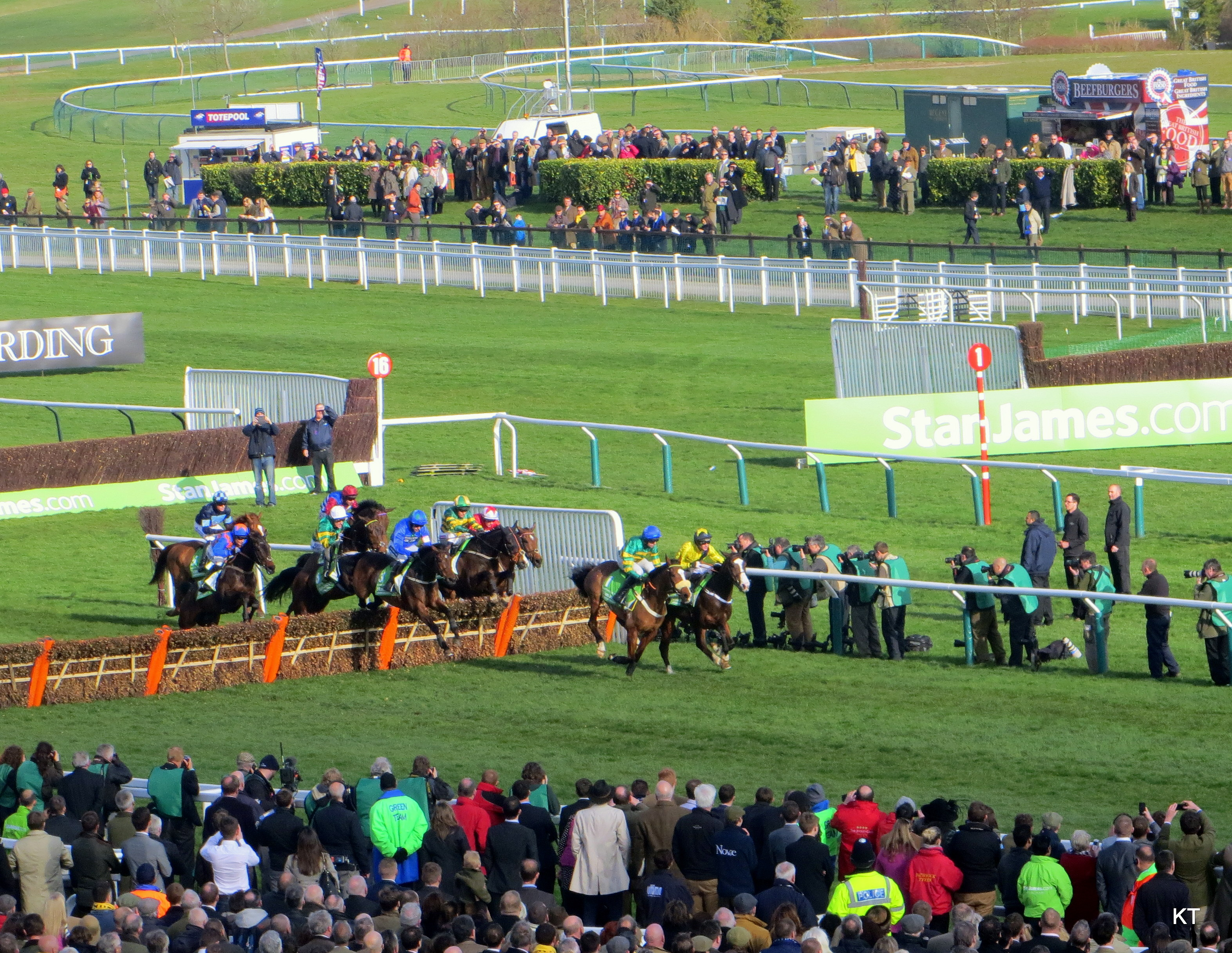
Champion Hurdle, 2014

The Cheltenham Festival is a horse racing-based meeting in the National Hunt racing calendar in the United Kingdom, with race prize money second only to the Grand National. The four-day festival takes place annually in March at Cheltenham Racecourse in Cheltenham, Gloucestershire. It usually coincides with Saint Patrick's Day and is particularly popular with Irish visitors.

The meeting features several Grade I races including the Cheltenham Gold Cup, Champion Hurdle, Queen Mother Champion Chase and Stayers' Hurdle. Large amounts of money are gambled; hundreds of millions of pounds are bet over the course of the week. Cheltenham is noted for its atmosphere, including the "Cheltenham roar", which refers to the enormous amount of noise that the crowd generates as the starter raises the tape for the first race of the festival.

The Cheltenham Festival was not held between 1941 and 1945 because of World War II and in 2001 due to the foot-and-mouth disease crisis.

== History ==
=== Origins ===
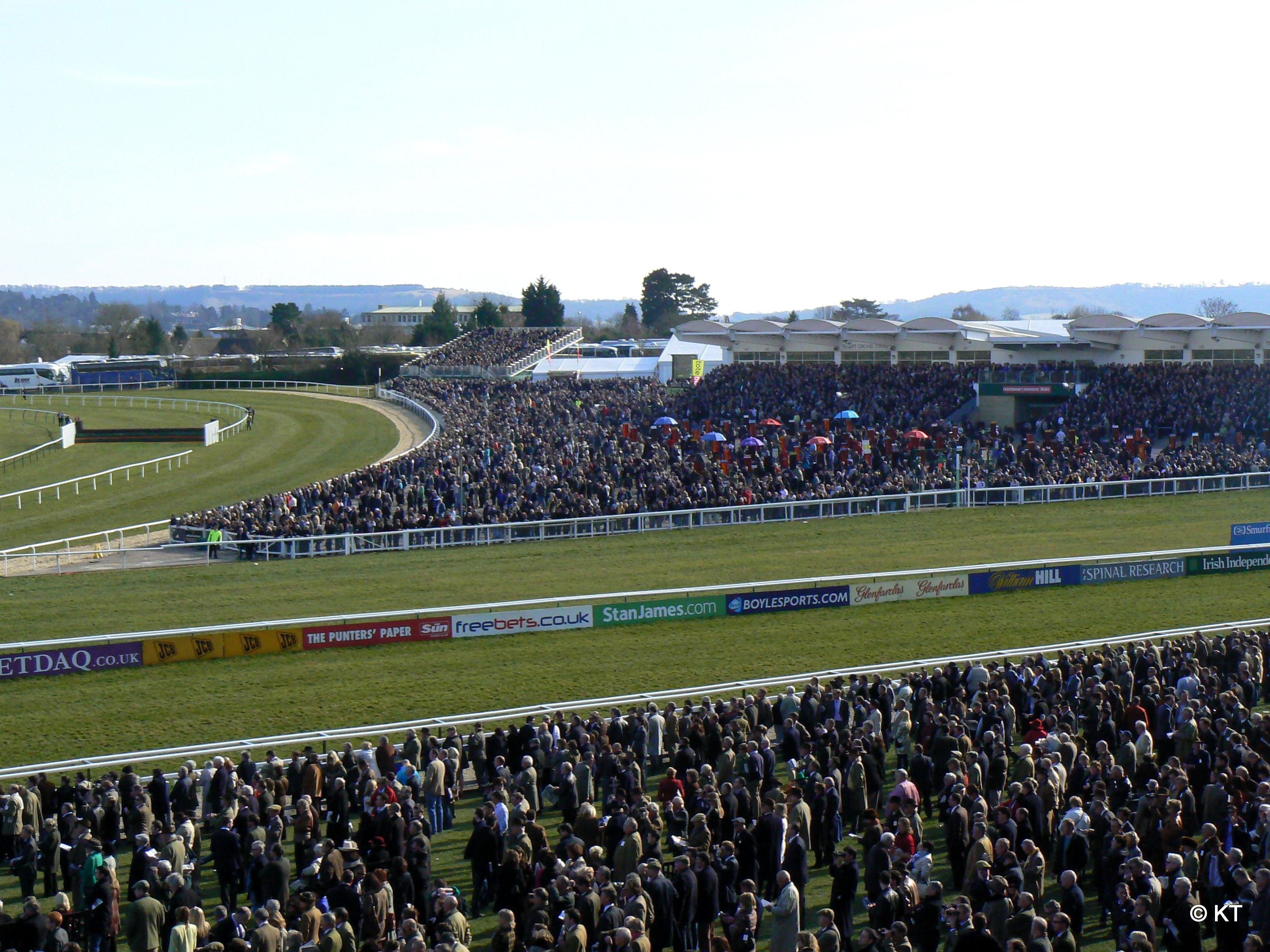
Cheltenham racecourse in 2010

The Cheltenham Festival originated in 1860 when the National Hunt Chase was first held at Market Harborough. It was initially titled the Grand National Hunt Meeting and took place at several locations since its institution, at the turn of the 20th century it was mostly held at Warwick Racecourse. In 1904 and 1905 it was staged at Cheltenham over a new course established at Prestbury Park in 1902, having previously taken place at Cheltenham in 1861. From 1906 to 1910 it was again held at Warwick but further additions and major improvements made at Cheltenham by Messrs. Pratt and Company, including a new stand (the fourth one), miles of drain to prevent unsuitable racing ground, tar paving in the enclosures and the paddock extended to 35 saddling boxes, proved enough to make the National Hunt Committee decide that the 1911 meeting was to return at Prestbury Park, Cheltenham where it remained to the present day. The earliest traceable reference to a "Festival" is in the Warwick Advertiser of 1907.

The Stayers' Hurdle, which first ran in 1912, is the oldest race from the Cheltenham festival that is currently a championship race. The Gold Cup, established in 1924, was originally a supporting race for the County Hurdle. This was the main event of the first day but that quickly changed, and in the following seasons it became a championship race. For many years it was still used by the trainers as a preparation race for the Grand National. The Champion Hurdle first ran in 1927 and the Queen Mother Champion Chase in 1959; they were both championship races from the time they were introduced, unlike the Stayers' Hurdle and Gold Cup.

=== Races ===
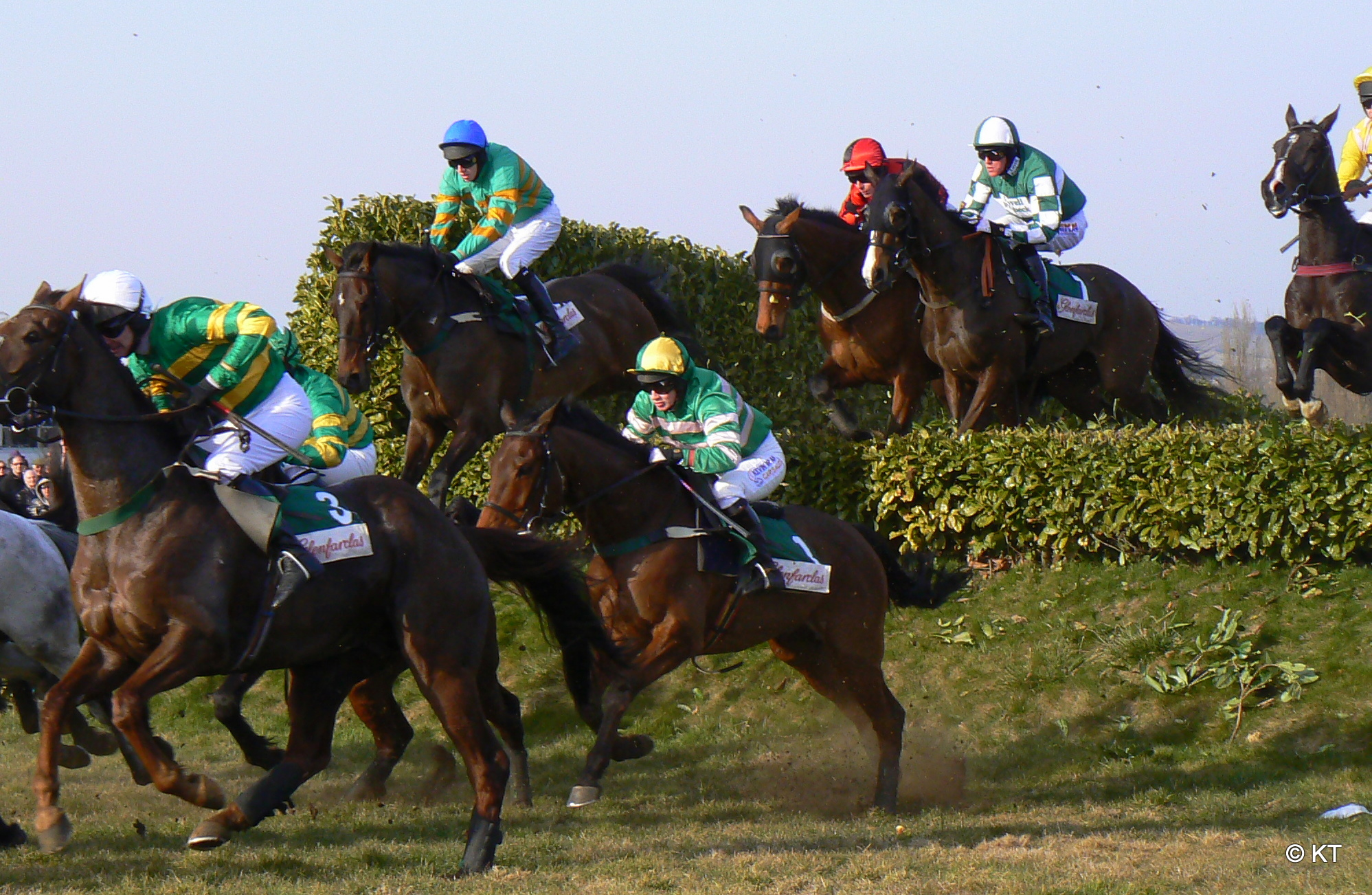
Cross-country chase, 2010

Until 2005 the festival had traditionally been held over the course of three days, but this changed with the introduction of a fourth day, meaning there would be one championship race on each day, climaxing with the Gold Cup on the Friday. To ensure each day would still have six races, five new races were introduced. Four further races have since been added, bringing the total to 28 races overall, with grade one events including the Champion Bumper, Triumph Hurdle, Ryanair Chase, Supreme Novices' Hurdle, Ballymore Novices' Hurdle, Arkle Challenge Trophy, Brown Advisory Novices' Chase, Champion Hurdle, Stayers' Hurdle, Queen Mother Champion Chase and the feature race, the Gold Cup. The festival also includes one of the two biggest Hunter Chases of the season, the Festival Hunters' Chase, which is run on the Friday over the same course as the Gold Cup.

Unlike Royal Ascot and many other top flat racing events in Great Britain and Ireland, the Cheltenham Festival does not have a history of attracting many international contenders, though French-trained horses have done well. Baracouda was perhaps the best known, after landing the Stayers' Hurdle twice.

== Notable events ==
=== 1983–2019 ===
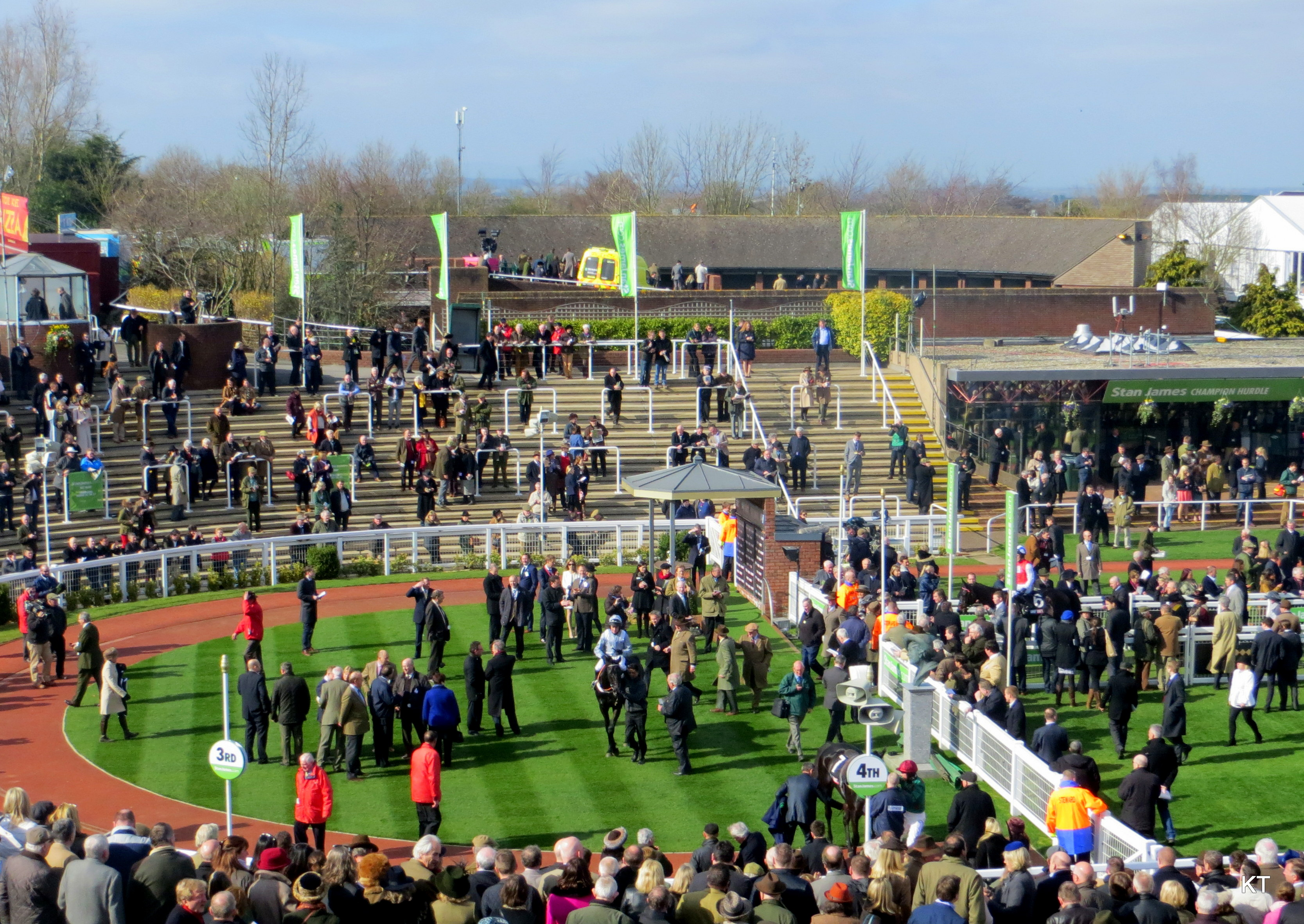
Winners' enclosure in 2014

In 1983 Caroline Beasley became the first female jockey to ride a winner at the festival. She won the Foxhunter Chase on Eliogarty.

On 17 March 1987, 21-year-old Gee Armytage won the Kim Muir Challenge Cup, back then held on Tuesdays and backed it with another victory the next day in the Mildmay of Flete Challenge Cup on a horse aptly named Gee-A, becoming the first female jockey to win a race against professionals at the festival.

In 2001 the festival was cancelled due to an outbreak of foot-and-mouth disease in Britain. The meeting had initially been postponed to April, but when a case of the disease was confirmed locally, putting the racecourse within an exclusion zone, all racing had to be called off.

In 2008, the second day of the festival was cancelled on safety grounds due to heavy storms making the marquees in the tented hospitality area unsafe. The races scheduled for that day were instead run on the third and final days. In 2019 a record opening day crowd of 67,934 people attended.

=== 2020 coronavirus pandemic ===
During the COVID-19 pandemic, and in line with government advice, the festival went ahead from 10 to 13 March 2020. The World Health Organization declared the outbreak a pandemic on 11 March. On 16 March, three days after the festival, the British government advised against large gatherings and on 23 March ordered a lockdown. The festival attracted 251,684 visitors that year, including a final-day crowd of 68,859, fewer than 2,000 down on the previous year's record.

There were fears in early April that the festival had helped spread the disease widely across the country. One visitor who developed COVID-19 later complained about having been "packed like sardines". Hundreds of festival visitors also said that they had developed symptoms. Gloucestershire Hospitals NHS Foundation Trust, which covers Cheltenham, recorded 125 deaths, roughly double that in two nearby trusts at Bristol (58 each), and those covering Swindon (67) and Bath (46).

=== 2026 ===
The 2026 Festival attracted 226,223 spectators across its four days, an increase of 8,130 on the 218,093 recorded in 2025.

== Horse safety concerns ==
For several years there have been concerns about the number of horse injuries and fatalities. In 2006, 11 horses died. In response the racecourse decreased the number of runners in certain races and re-sited one of the more difficult fences.. Animal Aid's Horse Death Watch has recorded the deaths every year at the festival since 2007:

Cheltenham Festival Horse Fatalities since 2007
Year	Horse Name	Cause of Death or Reason for Euthanasia
2007	Swift Thyne	Spinal injury
2007	Little Brick	Broken shoulder
2008	Whispered Promises	Fatal fall
2009	Clarified	Fatal fall
2010	Casey Jones	Brought down
2010	Citizen Vic	Fatal fall
2010	Izita Star	Spinal injury
2010	Fairyland	Fatal fall
2011	Lush Life	Injured leg
2012	Educated Evans	Fatal fall
2012	Garde Champetre	Broke down
2012	Scotsirish	Broken leg
2012	Featherbed Lane	Broken leg
2012	Abergavenny	Broken elbow
2013	Matuhi	Spinal injury
2014	Our Conor	Spinal inury
2014	Stack The Deck	Fracture
2014	Akdam	Broken foreleg
2014	Captain Cutter	Pelvic injury
2014	Raya Star	Fractured spine
2015	Rolling Star	Fatal fall
2016	Rezorbi	Fatal fall
2016	Pont Alexandre	Broken leg
2016	The Govaness	Fatal fall
2016	No More Heroes	Tendon injury
2016	Niceonefrankie	Fatal fall
2016	Montdragon	Fatal injury
2016	Long Dog	Broken leg
2017	Consul de Thaix	Broken neck
2017	Toe the Line	Broken leg
2017	Hadrians Approach	Broken leg
2017	Current Event	Tendon injury
2018	Mossback	Fractured Shoulder
2018	Report to Base	Fractured neck
2018	Melrose Boy	Struck into
2018	Some Plan	Fatal fall
2018	Sansend	Broken leg
2018	Dresden	Fatal fall
2018	North Hill Harvey	Fatal fall
2019	Ballyward	Fatal fall
2019	Invitation Only	Fatal fall
2019	Sir Erec	Fatal fall
2020	Copper Gone West	Broken leg
2021	Kings Temptation	Fatal fall
2022	Shallwehaveonemore	Fatal fall
2022	Mindsmadeup	Fatal fall
2022	Born Patriot	Fatal fall
2022	Ginto	Broke down
2023	Malinello	Fatal fall
2024	Highland Hunter	Collapsed
2024	Napper Tandy	Broken Neck
2025	Springwell bay	Fatal fall
2025	Corbetts Cross	Fatal fall
2026	Hansard	Broken leg
2026	HMS Seahorse	Fatal Fall
2026	Envoi Allen	Collapsed and died following race
2026	Saint Le Fort	Fatal Fall

At the 2018 festival there were seven horse deaths, leading to a British Horseracing Authority (BHA) review into equine safety. The review was published in December 2018 and listed 17 recommendations for future Cheltenham fixtures and jump racing in general, including reduced field size numbers at Cheltenham and a pre-race veterinary check for all runners at the festival. At the 2019 festival there were three horse deaths, leading to another BHA review. There have continued to be fatalities every year.

=== 2026 review of starting procedures ===
Following several false starts during the 2026 Cheltenham Festival, the BHA conducted a review of starting procedures. In July 2026, it recommended changes including modifications to the course layout, starting procedures and regulation, with the aim of reducing false starts and improving consistency at the starts of races.

== 2027 races ==
The number and type of races at the Cheltenham Festival has changed dramatically over the years of its existence. In particular, it has grown from a two-day meeting to a four-day meeting. In 2027, there will be 28 races as follows:

Day	Race	Obstacles	Distance	Class	Sponsor
Tuesday	Supreme Novices' Hurdle	Hurdles	2 mi 1/2 furlong (3.3 km)	Grade 1	SkyBet
Tuesday	Arkle Challenge Trophy	Fences	2 mi (3.2 km)	Grade 1	Singer Capital Markets
Tuesday	Fred Winter Juvenile Handicap Hurdle	Hurdles	2 mi 1/2 furlong (3.3 km)	Premier Handicap	McCoy Contractors
Tuesday	1911 Handicap Chase	Fences	3 mi 1 furlong (5.0 km)	Premier Handicap	Trustmarque Ultima
Tuesday	Champion Hurdle	Hurdles	2 mi 1/2 furlong (3.3 km)	Grade 1	Unibet
Tuesday	Sun Racing Plate Handicap Chase	Fences	2 mi 4 1/2 furlongs (4.1 km)	Premier Handicap	Sun Racing
Tuesday	National Hunt Challenge Cup	Fences	3 mi 6 furlongs (6.0 km)	Ungraded	–
Wednesday	Baring Bingham Novices' Hurdle	Hurdles	2 mi 5 furlongs (4.2 km)	Grade 1	Turners
Wednesday	Brown Advisory Novices' Chase	Fences	3 mi 1/2 furlong (4.9 km)	Grade 1	Brown Advisory
Wednesday	Olympian Cup	Hurdles	2 mi 5 furlongs (4.2 km)	Premier Handicap	BetMGM
Wednesday	Cross Country Chase	Cross Country	3 mi 6 furlongs (6.0 km)	Ungraded	Glenfarclas
Wednesday	Queen Mother Champion Chase	Fences	2 mi (3.2 km)	Grade 1	BetMGM
Wednesday	Johnny Henderson Grand Annual Chase	Fences	2 mi (3.2 km)	Premier Handicap	Debenhams
Wednesday	Champion Bumper	NHF	2 mi 1/2 furlong (3.3 km)	Grade 1	Weatherbys
Thursday	Golden Miller Novices' Chase	Fences	2 mi 4 furlongs (4 km)	Grade 1	Jack Richards
Thursday	Pertemps Final	Hurdles	3 mi (4.8 km)	Premier Handicap	Pertemps
Thursday	David Nicholson Mares' Hurdle	Hurdles	2 mi 4 furlongs (4 km)	Grade 1	Close Brothers Group
Thursday	Stayers' Hurdle	Hurdles	3 mi (4.8 km)	Grade 1	Paddy Power
Thursday	Festival Trophy	Fences	2 mi 5 furlongs (4.2 km)	Grade 1	Ryanair
Thursday	Dawn Run Mares' Novices' Hurdle	Hurdle	2 mi 1 furlong (3.4 km)	Grade 2	Ryanair
Thursday	Fulke Walwyn Kim Muir Challenge Cup	Fences	3 mi 2 furlongs (5.2 km)	Ungraded	Rosconn Group
Friday	Triumph Hurdle	Hurdles	2 mi 1 furlong (3.4 km)	Grade 1	JCB
Friday	County Handicap Hurdle	Hurdles	2 mi 1 furlong (3.4 km)	Premier Handicap	William Hill
Friday	Spa Novices' Hurdle	Hurdles	3 mi (4.8 km)	Grade 1	Albert Bartlett
Friday	Cheltenham Gold Cup	Fences	3 mi 2 1/2 furlongs (5.3 km)	Grade 1	Boodles
Friday	Foxhunter Chase	Fences	3 mi 2 1/2 furlongs (5.3 km)	Ungraded	-
Friday	Liberthine Mares' Chase	Fences	2 mi 4 1/2 furlongs (4.1 km)	Grade 2	Paddy Power
Friday	Martin Pipe Conditional Jockeys' Handicap Hurdle	Hurdles	2 mi 4 1/2 furlongs (4.1 km)	Ungraded	–

The 2026 Festival was notable for the number of outsider winners. The average starting price of the winners was 14–1, the highest at the Festival in the previous decade, while Martator and Apolon De Charnie won at odds of 66–1 and 50–1 respectively.

The Festival attracted 226,223 visitors across its four days, with four arrests recorded at the racecourse.

== Top jockeys ==
The top jockey for the festival is the jockey who wins the most races over the four days. The winners since 1980, with wins in brackets, are:

- 2026 Paul Townend (5)
- 2025 Paul Townend (4)
- 2024 Paul Townend (6)
- 2023 Paul Townend (5)
- 2022 Paul Townend (5)
- 2021 Rachael Blackmore (6)
- 2020 Paul Townend (5)
- 2019 Nico de Boinville (3)
- 2018 Davy Russell (4)
- 2017 Ruby Walsh (4)
- 2016 Ruby Walsh (7)
- 2015 Ruby Walsh (4)
- 2014 Ruby Walsh (3)
- 2013 Ruby Walsh (4)
- 2012 Barry Geraghty (5)
- 2011 Ruby Walsh (5)
- 2010 Ruby Walsh (3)
- 2009 Ruby Walsh (7)
- 2008 Ruby Walsh (3)
- 2007 Robert Thornton (4)
- 2006 Ruby Walsh (3)
- 2005 Graham Lee (3)
- 2004 Ruby Walsh (3)
- 2003 Barry Geraghty (5)
- 2002 Richard Johnson (2)
- 2001: Festival cancelled
- 2000 Mick Fitzgerald (4)
- 1999 Mick Fitzgerald (4)
- 1998 Tony McCoy (5)
- 1997 Tony McCoy (3)
- 1996 Richard Dunwoody (2)
- 1995 Norman Williamson (4)
- 1994 Charlie Swan (3)
- 1993 Charlie Swan (4)
- 1992 Jamie Osborne (5)
- 1991 Peter Scudamore (2)
- 1990 Richard Dunwoody (2)
- 1989 Tom Morgan (2)
- 1988 Simon Sherwood (2)
- 1987 Peter Scudamore (2)
- 1986 Peter Scudamore (2)
- 1985 Steve Smith Eccles (3)
- 1984 Jonjo O'Neill (2)
- 1983 Graham Bradley (2)
- 1982 Jonjo O'Neill (1)
- 1981 John Francome (3)
- 1980 Jim Wilson (3)

== Leading trainers ==
The leading trainer for the festival is the trainer who trains the most winners in the races over the four days. The winners since 1997, with wins in brackets, are:

- 2026 Willie Mullins (8)
- 2025 Willie Mullins (10)
- 2024 Willie Mullins (9)
- 2023 Willie Mullins (6)
- 2022 Willie Mullins (10)
- 2021 Willie Mullins (6)
- 2020 Willie Mullins (7)
- 2019 Willie Mullins (4)
- 2018 Gordon Elliott (8)
- 2017 Gordon Elliott (6)
- 2016 Willie Mullins (7)
- 2015 Willie Mullins (8)
- 2014 Willie Mullins (4)
- 2013 Willie Mullins (5)
- 2012 Nicky Henderson (7)
- 2011 Willie Mullins (4)
- 2010 Nicky Henderson (3)
- 2009 Paul Nicholls (5)
- 2008 Paul Nicholls (3)
- 2007 Paul Nicholls (4)
- 2006 Paul Nicholls (3)
- 2005 Howard Johnson (3)
- 2004 Paul Nicholls (4)
- 2003 Jonjo O'Neill (3)
- 2002 Martin Pipe (3)
- 2001 Festival cancelled
- 2000 Nicky Henderson (4)
- 1999 Paul Nicholls (3)
- 1998 Martin Pipe (4)
- 1997 Martin Pipe (4)

== See also ==
- Horse racing in Great Britain
- List of British National Hunt races
- Cheltenham Gold Cup
