= Thoroughbred racing =

Horse racing

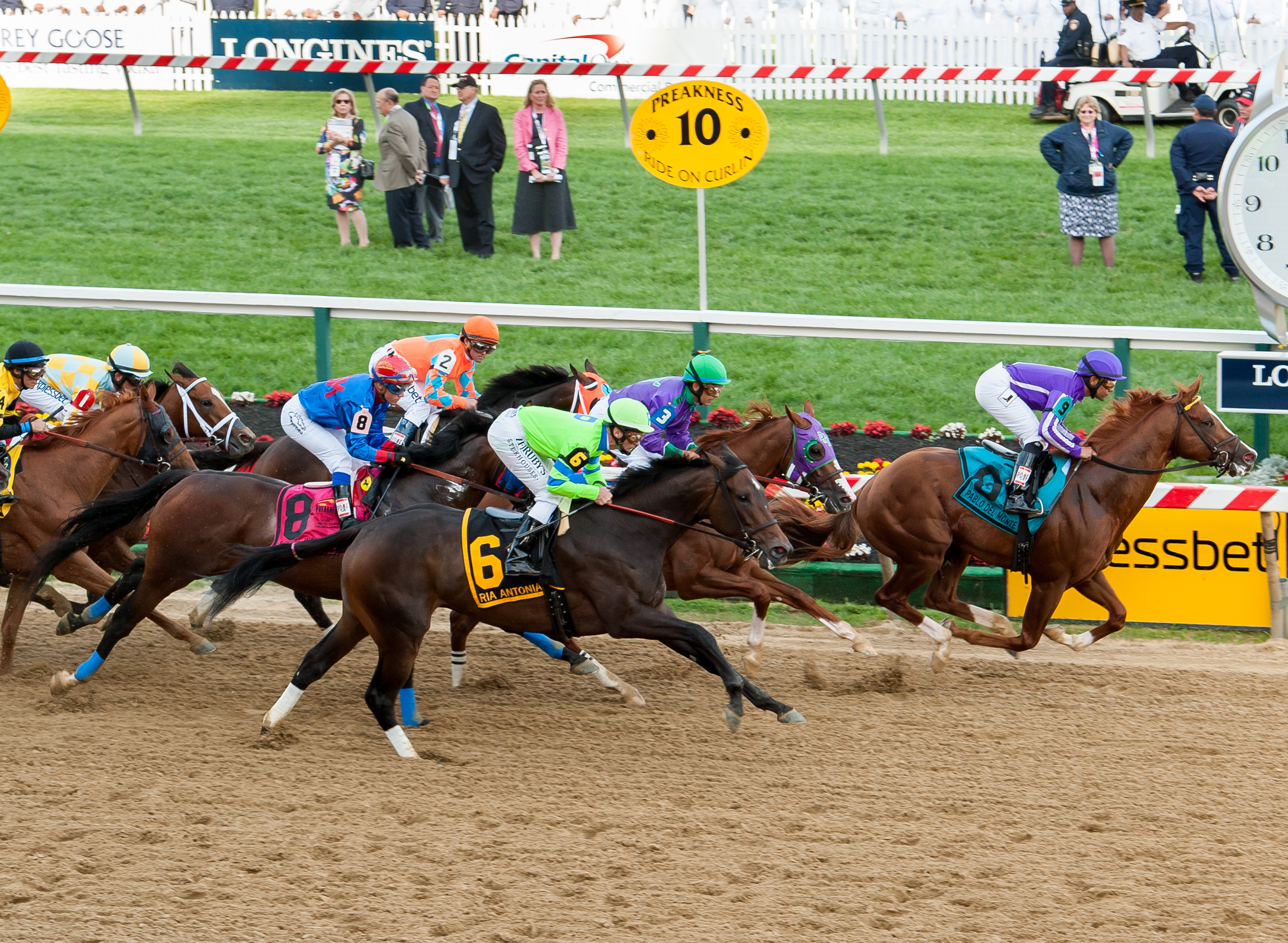
The start of the 2014 Preakness Stakes, an American Thoroughbred horse race

Thoroughbred racing is a sport and industry involving the racing of Thoroughbred horses. It is governed by different national bodies. There are two forms of the sport – flat racing and jump racing, the latter known as National Hunt racing in the UK and steeplechasing in the US. Jump racing can be further divided into hurdling and steeplechasing.

According to The Guardian, the racing of Thoroughbreds has been steadily declining in popularity worldwide. Between 700 and 800 racehorses die in racing each year.

== Ownership and training of racehorses ==
Traditionally, racehorses have been owned by wealthy individuals. It has become increasingly common in the last few decades for horses to be owned by syndicates or partnerships. Notable examples include the 2005 Epsom Derby winner Motivator, owned by the Royal Ascot Racing Club, 2003 Kentucky Derby winner Funny Cide, owned by a group of 10 partners organized as Sackatoga Stable, and 2008 Kentucky Derby winner Big Brown, owned by IEAH stables, a horse racing hedgefund organization.

Historically, most race horses have been bred and raced by their owners. Beginning after World War II, the commercial breeding industry became significantly more important in North America, Europe and Australasia, the result of which being that a substantial portion of Thoroughbreds are now sold by their breeders, either at public auction or through private sales. Additionally, owners may acquire Thoroughbreds by "claiming" them out of a race (see discussion of types of races below).

A horse runs in the unique colours of its owner. These colours must be registered under the national governing bodies and no two owners may have the same colours. The rights to certain colour arrangements ("cherished colours") are valuable in the same way that distinctive car registration numbers are of value. It is said that Sue Magnier (owner of George Washington, Galileo etc.) paid £50,000 for her distinctive dark blue colours. If an owner has more than one horse running in the same race then some slight variant in colours is often used (normally a different coloured cap) or the race club colours may be used.

The horse owner typically pays a monthly retainer or, in North America, a "day rate" to his or her trainer, together with fees for use of the training center or gallops (if the horse is not stabled at a race track), veterinarian and farrier (horseshoer) fees and other expenses such as mortality insurance premiums, stakes entry fees and jockeys' fees. The typical cost of owning a race horse in training for one year is in the order of £15,000 in the United Kingdom and as much as $35,000 at major race tracks in North America.

The facilities available to trainers vary enormously. Some trainers have only a few horses in the yard and pay to use other trainers' gallops. Other trainers have every conceivable training asset. It is a feature of racing that a modest establishment often holds its own against the bigger players even in a top race. This is particularly true of national hunt racing.

== Values ==
In 1976, Canadian Bound became the first Thoroughbred yearling racehorse ever to be sold for more than US$1 million when he was purchased at the Keeneland July sale by Canadians, Ted Burnett and John Sikura Jr.

== Organizations ==
=== Jockey clubs ===
Per the Oxford English Dictionary the concept of a jockey club dates to at least 1775 and is, in the generic, a "club or association for the promotion and regulation of horse racing". There are scores of national and regional jockey clubs, also called racing associations, worldwide. In addition to thoroughbreds, jockey clubs may race standardbred horses, Quarter Horses, or Arabians.

=== Ireland ===
Racing is governed on an All-Ireland basis, with two bodies sharing organising responsibility. The Irish Horseracing Regulatory Board is the rulemaking and enforcement body, whilst Horse Racing Ireland governs and promotes racing. In 2013, Ireland exported more than 4,800 Thoroughbreds to 37 countries worldwide with a total value in excess of €205 million ($278 million). This is double the number of horses exported annually from the U.S.

=== Great Britain ===
In Great Britain, Thoroughbred horse racing is governed by the British Horseracing Authority (BHA) which makes and enforces the rules, issues licences or permits to trainers and jockeys, and runs the races through their race course officials. The Jockey Club in the UK has been released from its regulatory function but still performs various supporting roles.

A significant part of the BHA's work relates to the disciplining of trainers and jockeys, including appeals from decisions made by the course stewards. Disciplinary enquiries usually relate to the running of a horse, for example: failure to run a horse on its merits, interference with other runners, excessive use of the whip. The emergence of internet betting exchanges has created opportunities for the public to lay horses and this development has been associated with some high-profile disciplinary proceedings.

In order to run under rules a horse must be registered at Weatherbys as a Thoroughbred. It must also reside permanently at the yard of a trainer licensed by the BHA or a permit holder. Similarly the horse's owner or owners must be registered as owners.

=== Australia ===
Thoroughbred racing is governed on a state-by-state basis in Australia. Racing NSW administers racing in New South Wales, Racing Victoria is the responsible entity in Victoria, the Brisbane Racing Club was an amalgamation in 2009 of the Queensland Turf Club and Brisbane Racing Club, and administers racing in Queensland.

Flemington Racecourse in Melbourne is home to the Melbourne Cup, the richest "two-mile" handicap in the world, and one of the richest turf races. The race is held on the first Tuesday in November during the Spring Racing Carnival, and is publicised in Australia as "the race that stops a nation".

=== United States ===
In the United States, safety regulations and drug restrictions are primarily controlled at the federal level by the Horseracing Integrity and Safety Authority. Other aspects of racing regulation are highly fragmented. Generally, a racing commission or other state government entity in each U.S. state that conducts racing will license owners, trainers and others involved in the industry, set racing dates, and oversee wagering. Pedigree matters and the registration of racing colors are the province of the Jockey Club, which maintains the American Stud Book and approves the names of all Thoroughbreds.

The National Steeplechase Association is the official sanctioning body of American steeplechase horse racing.

=== Canada ===
Regulation of horse racing in Canada is under the Jockey Club of Canada. There are a few racing venues across Canada, but the major events are mainly in Ontario and managed by the Woodbine Entertainment Group, formerly Ontario Jockey Club. While British Columbia's major venue is Hastings Racecourse with popular events like the annual BC Derby.

=== Hong Kong ===
In Hong Kong, regulation of horse racing is controlled by the Hong Kong Jockey Club. There are only two racecourses in Hong Kong in Happy Valley and Sha Tin, as well as Conghua Racecourse in Conghua, Guangzhou. The Hong Kong Jockey Club regulates all facets of races, owning the racecourses as well as on and off-course betting branches.

== Types of racing ==
Thoroughbred racing is divided into two codes: flat racing and jump races. The most significant races are categorised as Group races or Graded stakes races. Every governing body is free to set its own standards, so the quality of races may differ. Horses are also run under different conditions, for example Handicap races, Weight for Age races or Scale-Weight. Although handicapping is generally seen as serving the purpose of gambling rather than identifying the fastest horses, some of the best known races in the world, such as the Grand National or Melbourne Cup are run as handicaps.

=== Flat racing ===
Flat races can be run under varying distances and on different terms. Historically, the major flat racing countries were Australia, England, Ireland, France and the United States, but other countries, such as Japan and the United Arab Emirates, have emerged in recent decades. Some countries and regions have a long tradition as major breeding centers, namely Ireland and Kentucky.

In Europe and Australia, virtually all major races are run on turf (grass) courses, while in the United States, dirt surfaces (or, lately, artificial surfaces such as Polytrack) are prevalent. In Canada, South America and Asia, both surface types are common.

=== Jump racing ===
Jump races and steeplechases, called National Hunt racing in the United Kingdom and Ireland, are run over long distances, usually from two miles (3,200 m) up to four and a half miles (7,200 m), and horses carry more weight. Many jump racers, especially those bred in France, are not Thoroughbreds, being classified as AQPS. Novice jumping races involve horses that are starting out a jumping career, including horses that previously were trained in flat racing. National Hunt racing is distinguished between hurdles races and chases: the former are run over low obstacles and the latter over larger fences that are much more difficult to jump. National Hunt races are started by flag, which means that horses line up at the start behind a tape. Jump racing is popular in the UK, Ireland, France and parts of Central Europe, but only a minor sport or completely unknown in most other regions of the world. National Hunt flat races (or "bumpers") without fences or hurdles are also staged to provide experience for horses which have not taken part in flat racing.

== Horse breeding ==
In the world's major Thoroughbred racing countries, breeding of racehorses is a huge industry providing over a million jobs worldwide. While the attention of horseracing fans and the media is focused almost exclusively on the horse's performance on the racetrack or for male horses, possibly its success as a sire, little publicity is given to the brood mares. Such is the case of La Troienne, one of the most important mares of the 20th century to whom many of the greatest Thoroughbred champions, and dams of champions can be traced.

== Types of races ==
- A handicap race is one in which the runners have been "handicapped" by carrying more weight, also called an impost, according to their performance in other races. Theoretically, all horses have a chance of being competitive in a race that is correctly handicapped. Examples include the Melbourne Cup, the Grand National, the Cambridgeshire Handicap, the Donn Handicap, the Santa Anita Handicap, the Hollywood Gold Cup, the Auckland Cup, the Easter Handicap, and the Caulfield Cup.
- Higher-class races for bigger prizes are known by different terms in various countries—graded stakes races in the United States and Canada, conditions races in England and France, and group races in Australia and New Zealand. They often involve competitors that belong to the same gender, age and class. These races may, though, be "weight-for-age", with weights adjusted only according to age, and also there are "set weights" where all horses carry the same weight. Furthermore, there are "conditions" races, in which horses carry weights that are set by conditions, such as having won a certain number of races, or races of a certain value. Examples of a stakes/conditions race are the Breeders' Cup races, the Dubai World Cup, the 2,000 Guineas Stakes, the 1,000 Guineas Stakes, The Derby, The Oaks, the St. Leger Stakes, the Kentucky Derby, the Kentucky Oaks, the Preakness Stakes, the Belmont Stakes, the Travers Stakes, and the Prix de l'Arc de Triomphe.
- A maiden race is one in which the runners have never won a race. Maiden races can be among horses of many different age groups. It is similar to a stakes race in the respect that horses all carry similar weights and there are no handicapped "penalties". This is the primary method for racing a 2 year old for the first time, although only against other 2 year olds. Three-year-olds also only race against their own age in maiden races early in the year.
- An allowance race is one in which the runners run for a higher purse than in a maiden race. These races usually involve conditions such as "non-winner of three lifetime". They usually are for a horse which has broken its maiden but is not ready for stakes company.
- A claiming race is one in which the horses are all for sale for more or less the same price (the "claiming price") up until shortly before the race. The intent of this is to even the race; if a better-than-class horse is entered (with the expectation of an easy purse win), it might be lost for the claiming price, which is likely less than the horse is worth. Someone may wish to claim a horse if they think the horse has not been trained to its fullest potential under another trainer. If a horse is purchased, a track official tags it after the race, and it goes to its new owner.
- A selling race, or seller, is one in which the winner is put up for auction immediately after the race.
- An optional claiming race is a hybrid of allowance and claiming race, developed to increase field sizes. A horse who does not fit the conditions can still "run for the tag", i.e. be run conditional on also being offered for sale.
- A Sweepstakes is an old-fashioned term (now usually abbreviated to "Stakes") for a race in which the winning owner wins, or "sweeps" the entry fees paid by the owners of all the other horses entered.

== See also ==
- Thoroughbred racing in Australia
- Thoroughbred racing in New Zealand
- Horse racing in Great Britain
- Horse racing in Ireland
- Horse racing in New Zealand
- Horse racing in the United States
- Australian and New Zealand punting glossary
- Blood-Horse magazine List of the Top 100 U.S. Racehorses of the 20th Century
- Flat racing
- Glossary of equestrian terms
- Glossary of North American horse racing
- List of films about horse racing
- List of horse races
- List of leading Thoroughbred racehorses
- National Museum of Racing and Hall of Fame (US)
- Triple Crown of Thoroughbred Racing
