= Minella Indo =

Irish-bred Thoroughbred racehorse

- Racing silks of Barry Maloney
- Sire: Beat Hollow
- Grandsire: Sadler's Wells
- Dam: Carrigeen Lily
- Damsire: Supreme Leader
- Sex: Gelding
- Foaled: 18 April 2013
- Country: Ireland
- Colour: Bay
- Breeder: Mrs R H Lalor
- Owner: Barry Maloney
- Trainer: Henry de Bromhead
- Record: 24: 8-5-4
- Earnings: £712,348

Major wins
- Spa Novices' Hurdle (2019); Irish Daily Mirror Novice Hurdle (2019); M W Hickey Memorial Chase (2020); BetVictor Make Your Best Bet Chase (2020); Cheltenham Gold Cup (2021); Metal Man Chase (2023); Irish Daily Star Chase (2023)
- Last updated on 13 April 2024

Minella Indo (foaled 18 April 2013) is an Irish racehorse who competes in National Hunt racing. He was one of the leading Novices' Hurdlers 2018/19 season when he recorded Grade 1 victories in the Spa Novices' Hurdle and Irish Daily Mirror Novice Hurdle. He made little impact in his first season over fences but emerged as a top class steeplechaser in the 2020/21 season as he won the M W Hickey Memorial Chase and the BetVictor Make Your Best Bet Chase before taking the Cheltenham Gold Cup.

== Background ==
Minella Indo is a bay horse with a white star bred in Ireland by Mrs R H Lalor. As a foal in November 2013 he was consigned to the Tattersalls Ireland November National Hunt Sale and was bought for €24,000 by John Nallen of Minella Racing. He was gelded before the start of his racing career.

He is one of the best horses sired by Beat Hollow whose wins included the Grand Prix de Paris and the Arlington Million. Beat Hollow's other foals have included Sea Moon, Wicklow Brave (Irish St Leger), Cinders and Ashes (Supreme Novices' Hurdle) and Beaten Up (Doomben Cup). Minella Indo's dam Carrigeen Lily, who foaled him when 22 years old, showed some racing ability, winning four steeplechases from thirty-six attempts. Her dam Carrigeensharragh was also a successful steeplechaser and a distant female-line descendant of the influential British broodmare Genuine.

== Racing career ==
=== 2017/18 season ===
Minella Indo began his racing career on the amateur point-to-point circuit, and recorded an easy win in a maiden race over three miles on soft to heavy ground at Dromahane meeting on 18 March 2018. He then entered the ownership of Barry Maloney and was sent into training with Henry De Bromhead at Knockeen, County Waterford. On his first run under professional rules he ran third to Passageway and City Isle in a National Hunt Flat race at Punchestown on 28 April.

=== 2018/19 season ===
In the 2018/19 National Hunt season Minella Indo was campaigned in Novices' Hurdle races. He finished third in a maiden hurdle race at Limerick Racecourse in December and then came home second to Allaho in the Grade 3 Surehaul Mercedes-Benz Novice Hurdle at Clonmel Racecourse in February. For his next start the gelding was sent to the Cheltenham Festival and started a 50/1 outsider for the Grade 1 Albert Bartlett Novices' Hurdle over three miles on 15 March. Ridden as on his previous start by Rachael Blackmore he went to the front three flights from the finish and stayed on well to win by three lengths from the Gordon Elliott-trained favourite Commander of the Fleet. Blackmore commented "I can't believe it. I always knew he was a really nice horse and thought he was coming with a right shout, but you just don't think it's going to work out. It's brilliant I don't know what to say. It's an amazing place and I'm so glad to be part of it."

On 1 May, with Blackmore again in the saddle, Minella Indo started the 5/1 third choice in the betting for the Grade 1 Irish Daily Mirror Novice Hurdle at Punchestown. After tracking the front-running favourite Allaho he went to the front approaching the final hurdle and kept on well under pressure to win by two lengths. After the race, De Bromhead said "He just stays so well. Rachael said as soon as she pulled him out, he took off and he pricked his ears coming to the last. It's lovely to come here and win this on top of the Albert Bartlett. I'm a bit lost for words to be honest, just delighted. Chasing is the plan next season".

=== 2019/20 season ===
On his first appearance over fences, Minella Indo finished second to the mare Laurina in a beginners' chase over two and a half miles at Gowran Park on 23 November. In a similar event over three miles at Navan Racecourse on 18 January he started the 2/5 favourite and won by a length and a half from Captain CJ after taking the lead soon after the start. On 11 March Minella Indo ran for the second time at the Cheltenham Festival when he contested the Group 1 RSA Insurance Novices' Chase. He disputed the lead from the start and was in front at the final fence but was outpaced on the run-in and beaten a length into second place by the Nicky Henderson-trained Champ.

=== 2020/21 season ===
Minella Indo began his next campaign in the Grade 3 M.W. Hickey Memorial Chase at Wexford Racecourse on 26 October. Starting the 8/13 favourite in a four-runner field and won very easily, coming home 25 lengths clear of the Kim Muir Chase winner Milan Native, despite being eased down by Blackmore in the closing stages. De Bromhead said "I'm delighted with that - he jumped brilliant and Rachael was brilliant on him. He looked sharp for his first run... you'd be hoping he'd turn into a Gold Cup horse, but we'll see and we'll take it one race at time." Four weeks later the gelding went off the odds-on favourite for the Grade 2 BetVictor Make Your Best Bet Chase at Navan and recorded another easy victory as he went to the front at the penultimate obstacle and won by seven and a half lengths from Bramah Bull. In December the gelding was moved up to Grade 1 class and started favourite for the Savills Chase at Leopardstown Racecourse but fell at the eight fence of a race which was won by his stablemate A Plus Tard.

On 7 February Minella Indo went off favourite for the Irish Gold Cup at Leopardstown, but after being in contention for most of the way he finished fourth of the five starters behind Kemboy, The Storyteller and Delta Work, beaten just under seven lengths by the winner. With Blackmore riding A Plus Tard, Minella Indo was partnered by Jack Kennedy when he started at odds of 9/1 for the Cheltenham Gold Cup over three and a quarter miles on 19 March. Al Boum Photo, who was attempting to record a third consecutive win in the race, started favourite, while the other nine runners included Native River, Kemboy, Champ, Lostintranslation (Betfair Chase), Santini (runner-up in the previous year) and Frodon (King George VI Chase). After tracking the leaders as Frodon set the pace Minella Indo moved up to take the lead on the final turn. He held off a sustained challenge from A Plus Tard to win by one and a quarter lengths with a gap of four and a quarter lengths back to Al Boum Photo in third. The 21-year-old winning jockey, who has been plagued by injury problems said "This is what I have dreamed of as a child. It could always be a lot worse - broken legs and broken collarbones will heal. It's obviously unfortunate, but you have to get on with it. It's definitely the best day of my life. I know I'm still young, but I suppose I have been in the position where I could have been winning them for a couple of years, so to get it done is brilliant."

=== 2021/22 season ===
Minella Indo started the season with a 5 horse race at Down Royal in October. He came 3rd in a race won by Frodon. In the King George VI Chase he pulled up. In the Irish Gold Cup he was ridden by Robbie Power. He came 2nd by 6.5 lengths to Conflated. In the Cheltenham Gold Cup he was again ridden by Robbie Power. He came 2nd by 15 lengths to A Plus Tard.

=== 2022/23 season ===
Minella Indo's first race of the season was in the Savills New Years Day Chase in heavy conditions. He was ridden by Rachael Blackmore. He won by a neck from Stattler. In the Cheltenham Gold Cup he was ridden by Nico De Boinville. He was pulled up.

=== 2023/24 season ===
Minella Indo started the season with a race at Punchestown in October. He won by 1.75 lengths from Hurricane Georgie. In November in a grade 1 race at Down Royal he came 4th out of the 4 runners. In January he came 4th in a Cheltenham cross country handicap carrying top weight. At the Grand National he was 6th in the weights and was ridden by Rachael Blackmore. He led going over the last but was overtaken by I Am Maximus and Delta Work in the run in to finish 3rd, 8 lengths behind winner I Am Maximus and 0.5 lengths behind 2nd Delta Work.

== Pedigree ==
Pedigree of Minella Indo (IRE), bay gelding, 2013
Sire Beat Hollow (GB) 1997	Sadler's Wells (USA); 1981	Northern Dancer (CAN)	Nearctic
Sire Beat Hollow (GB) 1997	Sadler's Wells (USA); 1981	Northern Dancer (CAN)	Natalma (USA)
Sire Beat Hollow (GB) 1997	Sadler's Wells (USA); 1981	Fairy Bridge	Bold Reason
Sire Beat Hollow (GB) 1997	Sadler's Wells (USA); 1981	Fairy Bridge	Special
Sire Beat Hollow (GB) 1997	Wemyss Bight (GB); 1990	Dancing Brave (USA)	Lyphard
Sire Beat Hollow (GB) 1997	Wemyss Bight (GB); 1990	Dancing Brave (USA)	Navajo Princess
Sire Beat Hollow (GB) 1997	Wemyss Bight (GB); 1990	Bahamian (IRE)	Mill Reef (USA)
Sire Beat Hollow (GB) 1997	Wemyss Bight (GB); 1990	Bahamian (IRE)	Sorbus
Dam Carrigeen Lily (IRE) 1991	Supreme Leader (GB); 1982	Bustino	Busted
Dam Carrigeen Lily (IRE) 1991	Supreme Leader (GB); 1982	Bustino	Ship Yard
Dam Carrigeen Lily (IRE) 1991	Supreme Leader (GB); 1982	Princess Zena	Habitat (USA)
Dam Carrigeen Lily (IRE) 1991	Supreme Leader (GB); 1982	Princess Zena	Guiding Light (FR)
Dam Carrigeen Lily (IRE) 1991	Carrigeensharragh (IRE); 1976	Walshford (GB)	I Say
Dam Carrigeen Lily (IRE) 1991	Carrigeensharragh (IRE); 1976	Walshford (GB)	Romany Rose
Dam Carrigeen Lily (IRE) 1991	Carrigeensharragh (IRE); 1976	Rock Forest (GB)	King of the Jungle (IRE)
Dam Carrigeen Lily (IRE) 1991	Carrigeensharragh (IRE); 1976	Rock Forest (GB)	Tullymurry (Family 8-f)
