= Jody Townend =

Irish jockey

Jody Townend (born 27 December 1997) is an Irish jockey who competes as an amateur in National Hunt racing and flat racing.

== Background ==
Townend comes from a racing background. She is the daughter of point-to-point trainer Tim Townend; youngest sister of jockey Paul Townend; and cousin of former jockey Davy Condon. She grew up in Lisgoold in County Cork and started riding at a young age, later taking part in show jumping and eventing. In November 2015, she had her first ride in a point-to-point race and won on King Willie, trained by her father. After leaving school, she joined her brother at the yard of trainer Willie Mullins, having previously worked there in the summer holidays.

== Racing career ==
Townend rode her first winner under rules on 16 April 2018 on Port Rashid, owned and trained by her father, in a maiden hurdle race at Tramore. Three months later she had her first ride for Mullins, winning a bumper (National Hunt flat race) for female jockeys on Supreme Trix at Roscommon. She rode four winners that summer, but in October fractured a vertebra in a fall while schooling a horse and underwent surgery. Her recovery was delayed by a serious infection at the site of the surgery and she did not return to racing until July 2019. On her fourth ride back after injury, she won the Connacht Hotel (Q.R.) Handicap on Great White Shark for Mullins at the Galway Festival.

On 18 July 2020, Townend rode the future Group 1 winner Princess Zoe to win the Kildare Village Ladies Derby Handicap at the Curragh. She achieved her first graded race victory when Grangee, trained by Mullins, won the Grade 2 Mares' Bumper at the Dublin Racing Festival in February 2021. At the end of the 2020/21 season she was crowned Champion Lady Amateur Rider, a title she would retain for the following four seasons. Having won three graded bumpers, Townend won her first graded race over obstacles when Captain Cody landed the Paddy Kehoe Suspended Ceilings Novice Hurdle for Mullins at Fairyhouse in March 2024. A month later Redemption Day provided her with her first Grade 1 success when he won the Champion Bumper at Punchestown.

Townend secured her first win at the Cheltenham Festival in March 2025 when Bambino Fever won the Champion Bumper to give Mullins his fourteenth win in the race. She said: "I'm beyond cloud nine. I can't believe it and it'll take a long time to sink in.... I've grown up watching Paul ride winners round here and I'm really happy."

== Cheltenham Festival winner ==
- Champion Bumper - (1) Bambino Fever (2025)

== Other major wins ==
(Republic of Ireland) Ireland

- Champion INH Flat Race - (2) Redemption Day (2024), Bambino Fever (2025)
