= Metal Man Chase =

Steeplechase horse race in Ireland

Metal Man Chase
2026
Heart Wood	Ile Atlantique	Croke Park

Previous years
2025
Embassy Gardens	Monty's Star	Classic Getaway
2024
Jungle Boogie	Classic Getaway	Minella Crooner
2023
Minella Indo	Stattler	Roi Mage
2022
Al Boum Photo	Burrows Saint	Brahma Bull
2021
Al Boum Photo	Acapella Bourgeois	I'm A Game Changer

2020-2011
2020
Al Boum Photo	Acapella Bourgeois	Shattered Love
2019
Al Boum Photo	Total Recall	Invitation Only
2018
Bachasson	A Toi Phil	Champagne West
2017
Champagne West	Roi Des Francs	Clarcam
2015
Roi Du Mee	Marito	Aupcharlie
2014
Marito	Roi Du Mee	Torphichen
2013
Roi Du Mee	Tranquil Sea	Blazing Tempo
2012
Apt Approach	Tranquil Sea	The Fonze
2011
Barker	Back Of The Pack	Whinstone Boy

2010-2005
2010
The Fonze	Anothercoppercoast	Snowy Morning
2009
One Cool Cookie	Knight Legend	The Fonze
2008
Knight Legend	Carrigeen Kalmia	Ansar
2007
Cloudy Bays	Mossy Green	Public Reaction
2006
Kymandjen	Barrow Drive	Garvivonnian
2005
Cloudy Bays	Satco Express	Jasmin D'Oudairies

The Metal Man Chase is a Grade 3 National Hunt steeplechase in Ireland which is open to horses aged five years or older. It is run at Tramore Racecourse over a distance of about 2 miles and 7 furlongs (2 miles 6 furlongs and 170 yards or 4,581 metres). The race is scheduled to take place each year on New Year's Day and is currently run as the O'Driscoll's Irish Whiskey New Year's Day Chase.

The race was previously known as the WIlf Dooly Chase, and had Listed status. It was awarded Grade 3 status in 2020.

== Records ==
Most successful horse (4 wins):

- Al Boum Photo - 2019, 2020, 2021, 2022

Leading jockey (5 wins):

- Paul Townend - Marito (2014), Bachasson (2018), Al Boum Photo (2020, 2021, 2022)

Leading trainer (9 wins):

- Willie Mullins - Barker (2011), Apt Approach (2012), Marito (2014), Bachasson (2018), Al Boum Photo (2019, 2020, 2021, 2022), Embassy Gardens (2025)

== Winners ==
Year	Winner	Age	Jockey	Trainer
2005	Cloudy Bays	8	Andrew McNamara	Charles Byrnes
2006	Kymandjen	9	J L Cullen	Paul Nolan
2007	Cloudy Bays	10	Davy Russell	Charles Byrnes
2008	Knight Legend	9	Barry Geraghty	Jessica Harrington
2009	One Cool Cookie	8	Davy Russell	Charlie Swan
2010	The Fonze	9	Shay Barry	Eoin Doyle
2011	Barker	10	David Casey	Willie Mullins
2012	Apt Approach	9	David Casey	Willie Mullins
2013	Roi Du Mee	8	Davy Russell	Gordon Elliott
2014	Marito	8	Paul Townend	Willie Mullins
2015	Roi Du Mee	10	Kevin Sexton	Gordon Elliott
2017	Champagne West	9	David Mullins	Henry de Bromhead
2018	Bachasson	7	Paul Townend	Willie Mullins
2019	Al Boum Photo	7	Ruby Walsh	Willie Mullins
2020	Al Boum Photo	8	Paul Townend	Willie Mullins
2021	Al Boum Photo	9	Paul Townend	Willie Mullins
2022	Al Boum Photo	10	Paul Townend	Willie Mullins
2023	Minella Indo	10	Rachael Blackmore	Henry de Bromhead
2024	Jungle Boogie	10	Darragh O'Keefe	Henry de Bromhead
2025	Embassy Gardens	9	Michael O'Sullivan	Willie Mullins
2025	Heart Wood	8	Darragh O'Keefe	Henry de Bromhead

== See also ==
- Horse racing in Ireland
- List of Irish National Hunt races
