= Princess Zoe =

German-bred Thoroughbred racehorse

- Sire: Jukebox Jury
- Grandsire: Montjeu
- Dam: Palace Princess
- Damsire: Tiger Hill
- Sex: Mare
- Foaled: 11 March 2015
- Country: Germany
- Colour: Grey
- Breeder: Gestüt Höny-Hof
- Owner: Stall TSF; Patrick F Kehoe & Philomena Crampton
- Trainer: Stefan Richter; Anthony Mullins
- Record: 37: 9-8-3
- Earnings: £428,676

Major wins
- Oyster Stakes (2020); Prix du Cadran (2020); Sagaro Stakes (2022)

Princess Zoe (foaled 11 March 2015) is a German-bred Thoroughbred racehorse. Beginning her racing career as a three-year-old in Germany, she showed modest racing ability, winning two minor events from fifteen starts. After being sold and going into training with Anthony Mullins in Ireland she showed remarkable improvement, winning five consecutive races including the Oyster Stakes and the Prix du Cadran as a five-year-old in 2020. There were no wins the following season but she achieved second place in the Ascot Gold Cup and the Irish St Leger Trial Stakes and in 2022 won the Sagaro Stakes. She was retired from flat racing in October 2022 and in January 2023 won on her first outing over hurdles.

== Background ==
Princess Zoe is a grey mare bred in Germany by the Hesse-based Gestüt Höny-Hof. She was from the second crop of foals sired by Jukebox Jury (from whom she inherited her grey colour), a top class stayer whose wins included the Preis von Europa in 2009 and the Irish St Leger in 2011. Princess Zoe's dam Palace Princess won two minor races before becoming a successful broodmare whose other foals have include the Badener Meile winner Palace Prince. She was a female-line descendant of the British broodmare Ski Maid (foaled 1953) making her a distant relative of Blue Bunting.

== Racing career ==
=== Early career ===
Princess Zoe was unraced as a juvenile and began her racing career as a three-year-old with trainer Stefan Richter in the colours of Stall TSF. On her first racecourse appearance on 25 July 2018 she finished ninth in a minor race at Hoppegarten and then ran third at the same track on 11 August. On 9 September at Munich she recorded her first success when she was ridden by Martin Seidl and came home five lengths clear of her rivals in a minor event over 2000 metres on soft ground. After finishing second at Munich in October she ended her first season by winning a minor handicap race over 2200 metres at the same track on 1 November. Princess Zoe spent the 2019 season competing in minor handicap races at in Germany and failed to win in ten starts, mainly racing over distances of around 2000 metres. Her best efforts came when she finished second at Hoppegarten on 9 June, 3 October and 13 October.

=== 2020: five-year-old season ===
In early 2020 Princess Zoe was bought by the Gowran-based trainer Anthony Mullins on behalf of siblings Paddy Kehoe and Philomena Crampton. Mullins had been unable to travel to Germany to view the mare owing to travel restrictions imposed as a result of the COVID-19 pandemic. He later admitted "I was very lucky that I didn't go because when she arrived home, she has quite crooked legs. I know if I had went to Germany, I wouldn't have bought her so thanks be to God I bought her on the phone because when she arrived I couldn't do anything about it. I couldn't send her back and they had been paid". On her first run for her new connections, Princess Zoe finished second in a minor handicap over one mile and five furlongs at Navan Racecourse on 23 June. On 18 July the mare was ridden by the amateur Jody Townend in the Kildare Village Ladies Derby Handicap over one and a half miles at the Curragh and started the 4/1 second favourite in a fifteen-runner field. She recorded her first victory in over 20 months as she took the lead two furlongs from the finish and won "easily" by five lengths. Nine days later at Galway Racecourse Princess Zoe was stepped up in distance for a more valuable handicap over two miles and a furlong in which she was ridden by the amateur Finian Maguire and was assigned a weight of 150 pounds. Starting at odds of 7/1 she raced in mid-division before staying on strongly in the straight, taking the lead in the closing stages and winning by one and a quarter lengths. Five days later at the same track the mare contested a handicap over one and a half miles, and won "snugly" by half a length from Emperor of the Sun after gaining the advantage inside the final furlong. She was ridden by apprentice Joey Sheridan who became her regular jockey, riding her in all but one of her future races on the flat.

Princess Zoe was then stepped up to Listed class for the Oyster Stakes over one and a half miles at Galway on 8 September when she started the 2/1 favourite, with the best-fancied of her twelve opponents being the improving handicapper Mighty Blue and the Epsom Oaks runner-up Ennistymon. In a race run in thick fog on heavy ground, the mare took the lead approaching the final furlong and won "comfortably" by one and three quarter lengths from Barrington Court. After the race Anthony Mullins said "It's a great relief to have that over, particularly to see her do it on heavy ground... This one has delivered every time – and it shows, though few and far between, that a small stable can compete at this level" before mentioning the Cesarewitch, Prix du Cadran and Cheltenham Festival as future targets.

Princess Zoe was then sent to France and stepped up to the highest class to contest the Group 1 Prix du Cadran over 4000 metres at Longchamp Racecourse on 3 October. She went off the 31/10 second favourite behind the 2019 winner Call The Wind in a nine-runner field which included only one other Group race winner, namely Windstoss (Deutsches Derby, Preis von Europa). Racing on heavy ground, Princess Zoe settled in mid-division as the five-year-old gelding Alkuin set the pace, before starting to make sustained progress 1400 metres from the finish. She "reeled in" the leader in the straight, gained the advantage in the final strides and won by half a length. Sheridan was given a 12-day suspension for excessive use of the whip.

Princess Zoe returned to Longchamp on 25 October for the Prix Royal-Oak over 3100 metres when she was ridden by Seamie Heffernan, as regular jockey Sheridan was serving a whip suspension. Starting the 21/10 second favourite she stayed on in the straight but was unable to reach the leaders and came home fourth behind Subjectivist, Valia and Holdthasigreen.

=== 2021: six-year-old season ===
Princess Zoe's seasonal reappearance came in a listed race at Cork, the Noblesse Stakes, in which she finished ninth of ten runners. This was followed by fourth place in the Vintage Tipple Stakes at Gowran Park. Her next race was the Gold Cup at Royal Ascot on 17 June. Starting as a 28/1 outsider in a field of twelve, she finished second to Subjectivist, beaten by five lengths. She then came second to Twilight Payment in the Group 3 St Leger Trial Stakes at the Curragh, before heading to France to defend her crown in the Prix du Cadran. On this occasion she came fifth behind favourite Trueshan and second favourite Stradivarius.

=== 2022: seven-year-old season ===
In February 2022 Princess Zoe was flown out to Riyadh to contest the Group 3 Red Sea Turf Handicap. She finished tenth in a field of fourteen. On her next appearance she returned to winning form, taking the Group 3 Sagaro Stakes at Ascot by a head from Quickthorn. After the race there was a stewards' enquiry as Princess Zoe had interfered with the third-placed Enemy inside the final furlong. Sheridan was given a four-day ban for careless riding, but the result stood. Mullins said "I'll never have the like of her again. You have no idea what it means to get one like her when you have trained ordinary horses for 25-30 years. She's part of the family now." It was to be Princess Zoe's only victory of the season. In the Ascot Gold Cup she came sixth of nine behind Kyprios; in the Goodwood Cup she came seventh of nine behind Kyrpios; in the Irish St. Leger she came sixth of eleven behind Kyprios. In October she contested the Prix du Cadran and the Prix Royal-Oak in France, coming fourth in both races.

After the Prix Royal-Oak, Mullins announced that Princess Zoe would be retired from flat racing and sold for breeding. She was put up for sale at the Tattersalls Mares Sale in December but failed to meet her reserve price and was returned to training with a view to running over hurdles.

=== 2022/23 National Hunt season ===
Princess Zoe made her debut over jumps in January 2023 in a mares maiden hurdle at Punchestown Racecourse. Ridden by Danny Mullins and starting at 5/4 second favourite, she won in a dead-heat with outsider Ladybank. Her next outing was to the 2023 Cheltenham Festival where she ran in the Grade 2 Jack de Bromhead Mares' Novices' Hurdle. Starting at odds of 9/1, she rallied after a mistake at the last and finished in fifth place, four-and-a-quarter lengths behind the winner You Wear It Well. In April she was pulled up in the Grade 1 Mares Novice Hurdle Championship Final at Fairyhouse Racecourse in Ireland, having sustained cuts to her left hind leg.

On 8 May 2023, Princess Zoe was removed from Mullins' yard, after a disagreement between the owner and trainer.

== Pedigree ==
Pedigree of Princess Zoe (GER), grey mare 2015
Sire Jukebox Jury (IRE) 2006	Montjeu (IRE); 1995	Sadler's Wells (USA)	Northern Dancer (CAN)
Sire Jukebox Jury (IRE) 2006	Montjeu (IRE); 1995	Sadler's Wells (USA)	Fairy Bridge
Sire Jukebox Jury (IRE) 2006	Montjeu (IRE); 1995	Floripedes (FR)	Top Ville (IRE)
Sire Jukebox Jury (IRE) 2006	Montjeu (IRE); 1995	Floripedes (FR)	Toute Cy
Sire Jukebox Jury (IRE) 2006	Mare Aux Fees (GB); 1988	Kenmare (FR)	Kalamoun (GB)
Sire Jukebox Jury (IRE) 2006	Mare Aux Fees (GB); 1988	Kenmare (FR)	Belle of Ireland (GB)
Sire Jukebox Jury (IRE) 2006	Mare Aux Fees (GB); 1988	Feerie Boreale (FR)	Irish River
Sire Jukebox Jury (IRE) 2006	Mare Aux Fees (GB); 1988	Feerie Boreale (FR)	Skelda
Dam Palace Princess (GER) 2004	Tiger Hill (IRE); 1995	Danehill (USA)	Danzig
Dam Palace Princess (GER) 2004	Tiger Hill (IRE); 1995	Danehill (USA)	Razyana
Dam Palace Princess (GER) 2004	Tiger Hill (IRE); 1995	The Filly (GER)	Appiani (ITY)
Dam Palace Princess (GER) 2004	Tiger Hill (IRE); 1995	The Filly (GER)	Tigress Silver (IRE)
Dam Palace Princess (GER) 2004	Pasca (GER); 1989	Lagunas (GB)	Ile de Bourbon (USA)
Dam Palace Princess (GER) 2004	Pasca (GER); 1989	Lagunas (GB)	Liranga (GER)
Dam Palace Princess (GER) 2004	Pasca (GER); 1989	Palmas	Neckar
Dam Palace Princess (GER) 2004	Pasca (GER); 1989	Palmas	Princess Corviglia (GB) (Family: 4-n)
