= T. A. Morris Memorial Mares Chase =

Steeplechase horse race in Ireland

- Class: Listed
- Location: Clonmel; County Tipperary, Ireland
- Race type: Steeplechase
- Website: www.clonmelraces.ie

Race information
- Distance: 2m 4f 51y (4,070 metres)
- Surface: Turf
- Track: Right-handed
- Qualification: Four-years-old and up fillies and mares
- Weight: 10 st 2 lb (4yo); 10 st 11 lb (5yo+)
- Purse: €30,000 (2020); 1st: €17,700

T.A. Morris Memorial Mares Chase
2026
A Snow White Park	Bynx	Jolie Jewel

Previous years
2025
Spindleberry	Kilbarry Saint	Bioluminescence
2024
Pink In The Park	Must Be Obeyed	A Law Of Her Own
2023
Allegorie De Vassy	Instit	Regina Dracones
2022
Dolcita	Ballyshannon Rose	Scarlet And Dove
2021
Mount Ida	Scarlet And Dove	Fairyhill Run

2020-2011
2020
Shattered Love	Cabaret Queen	Western Victory
2019
Shattered Love	Listen Dear	Kupatana
2018
Camelia De Cotte	Timeforwest	Dinaria Des Obeaux
2017
Dinaria Des Obeaux	Miss Eyecatcher	Slowmotion
2016
Westerner Lady	Thanks For Tea	Rock On The Moor
2015
Vroum Vroum Mag	Miss Dinamic	Perfect Promise
2014
Jennies Jewel	Pollywollydoodle	Elsie
2013
Ballinahow Lady	Backinthere	Avondhu Lady
2012
Tarla	Our Girl Salley	Avondhu Lady
2011
Blazing Tempo	Gentle Alice	For Bill

2010-2001
2010
Blazing Tempo	Cool Quest	For Bill
2009
Moskova	Hello Kitty	Here Comes Sally
2008
Bohemian Lass	Stonehouse	Oscar Rebel
2007
Gazza's Girl	Emma Jane	Tiarella
2006
Cailin Alainn	Chicago Vic	Kerrys Cottage
2005
Court Leader	Kerrys Cottage	Sunami Storm
2004
Nolans Pride	Gli Gli	Shanann Lady

The T. A. Morris Memorial Mares Chase is a Listed National Hunt steeplechase in Ireland which is open to mares aged four years or older. It is run at Clonmel over a distance about 2 miles and 4 furlongs (2 miles 4 furlongs and 51 yards, or 4,070 metres). The race is for novice chasers, and it is scheduled to take place each year in November.

The race was first run in 2004 when it had Listed status. It was awarded Grade 3 status in 2009 and downgraded back to Listed status in 2017.

== Records ==
Most successful horse (2 wins):

- Blazing Tempo – 2010, 2011
- Shattered Love – 2019, 2020

Leading jockey (5 wins):

- Ruby Walsh – Moskova (2009), Blazing Tempo (2011), Tarla (2012), Vroum Vroum Mag (2015), Westerner Lady (2016)
- Paul Townend - Blazing Tempo (2010), Camelia de Cotte (2018), Dolcita (2022), Allegorie De Vassy (2023), Spindleberry (2025)

Leading trainer (10 wins):

- Willie Mullins – Blazing Tempo (2010, 2011), Tarla (2012), Vroum Vroum Mag (2015), Westerner Lady (2016), Camelia de Cotte (2018), Dolcita (2022), Allegorie De Vassy (2023), Pink In The Park (2024), Spindleberry (2025)

== Winners ==
Year	Winner	Age	Jockey	Trainer
2004	Nolans Pride	7	Martin Ferris	Liam Burke
2005	Court Leader	7	Robbie Power	Thomas Mullins
2006	Cailin Alainn	7	Davy Russell	Charles Byrnes
2007	Gazza's Girl	7	Barry Geraghty	Jessica Harrington
2008	Bohemian Lass	5	John Cullen	Bill Harney
2009	Moskova	6	Ruby Walsh	Paul Nolan
2010	Blazing Tempo	6	Paul Townend	Willie Mullins
2011	Blazing Tempo	7	Ruby Walsh	Willie Mullins
2012	Tarla	6	Ruby Walsh	Willie Mullins
2013	Ballinahow Lady	8	John Cullen	David M O'Brien
2014	Jennies Jewel	7	Ian McCarthy	Jarlath P Fahey
2015	Vroum Vroum Mag	6	Ruby Walsh	Willie Mullins
2016	Westerner Lady	6	Ruby Walsh	Willie Mullins
2017	Dinaria Des Obeaux	4	Jack Kennedy	Gordon Elliott
2018	Camelia de Cotte	6	Paul Townend	Willie Mullins
2019	Shattered Love	8	Mark Walsh	Gordon Elliott
2020	Shattered Love	9	Mark Walsh	Gordon Elliott
2021	Mount Ida	7	Davy Russell	Gordon Elliott
2022	Dolcita	7	Paul Townend	Willie Mullins
2023	Allegorie De Vassy	6	Paul Townend	Willie Mullins
2024	Pink In The Park	7	Danny Mullins	Willie Mullins
2025	Spindleberry	7	Paul Townend	Willie Mullins
2026	A Snow White Park	5	Danny Mullins	Margaret Mullins

== See also ==
- Horse racing in Ireland
- List of Irish National Hunt races
