= 1756 to 1760 in sports =

Events in world sport through the years 1756 to 1760.

== Boxing ==
Events

- 1756 — Bill "The Nailer " Stevens defeated a number of unnamed opponents until 1759.
- 1757 — George Taylor defeated Tom Faulkner twice.
- 6 August 1758 — Faulkner defeated Taylor in the 26th round after 1 hour 15 minutes of a fight at St. Alban's. Faulkner claimed the title after the bout.
- 20 October 1759 — Jack Slack v Jack Moreton at Acton Wells. Slack won after 35 minutes.
- 19 February 1760 — Bill " The Nailer " Stevens defeated Jacob Taplin in 13 round fight lasting 30 minutes at Marylebone Basin.
- 17 June 1760 — Jack Slack was defeated by Bill "The Nailer" Stevens in the fourth round of a fight lasting 27 minutes; Slack retired from the ring soon afterwards to open a shop on Chandos Street, London. He lived there for the rest of his life.

== Cricket ==
Events

- 1756 — Hambledon, almost certainly a local parish organisation at this time, played three matches against the prominent Dartford Cricket Club.
- 1757–1760 — Perhaps for the first time, cricket felt the full impact of a major war as it suffered a drain in manpower and investment during the Seven Years' War (to 1763); few first-class matches were recorded with none at all in 1760.
- September 1759 — Three Dartford v England matches were played, a number of well-known names being involved; Dartford won the "series" 2–1.
- c.1760 — It is about this time that pitched delivery bowling began; in turn, it necessitated the creation and deployment of the modern straight bat, replacing the old "hockey stick" type which could not cope with a ball that bounced.

== Golf ==
Events

- 1758 — First codified Rules of Golf published by the St Andrews Golfers, later The Royal and Ancient Golf Club of St Andrews.

== Horse racing ==
Events

- 1758 — The Society of Sportsmen of the Curragh, a precursor of the Irish Turf Club was formed.

== Sources ==
- Ashley-Cooper, F. S. (1900). "At the Sign of the Wicket: Cricket 1742–1751". Cricket.
- Buckley, G. B. (1935). Fresh Light on 18th Century Cricket. Cotterell.
- Maun, Ian (2011). From Commons to Lord's, Volume Two: 1751 to 1770. Martin Wilson. ISBN 978-0-9569066-0-1.
