= Al Boum Photo =

French-bred Thoroughbred National Hunt racehorse

- Racing silks of Emmanuel Clayeux and Mrs J Donnelly
- Sire: Buck's Boum
- Grandsire: Cadoudal
- Dam: Al Gane
- Damsire: Dom Alco
- Sex: Gelding
- Foaled: 21 May 2012
- Country: France
- Colour: Bay
- Breeder: Emmanuel Clayeux and Jacky Rauch
- Owner: Emmanuel Clayeux; Mrs J Donnelly
- Trainer: Emmanuel Clayeux; Willie Mullins
- Record: 17: 9-2-1
- Earnings: £898,384

Major wins
- Festival Novice Hurdle (2017); Ryanair Gold Cup (2018); Savills New Year's Day Chase (2019, 2020, 2021, 2022); Cheltenham Gold Cup (2019, 2020); Timeform rating: 174
- Last updated on 16 March 2024

Al Boum Photo is a French-bred, Irish-trained racehorse who won the Cheltenham Gold Cup in 2019 and 2020.

== Background ==
Al Boum Photo is a dark bay gelding with a small white star, and was bred in France by Emmanuel Clayeux & Jacky Rauch. He initially raced in the colours of Clayeux, who also trained him.

== Racing career ==
On his racecourse debut Al Boum Photo fell in a hurdle race at Moulins in France on 14 September 2015. In the following year he was sent to race in Ireland where he was trained by Willie Mullins and carried the colours of Mrs J Donnelly.

In the 2016/17 National Hunt season he finished third on his first appearance for his new connections. He then won a minor race at Thurles Racecourse before winning the Grade 2 Festival Hurdle at Fairyhouse and finishing fifth in the Irish Daily Mirror Novice Hurdle at Punchestown. In the first two races he was ridden by Ruby Walsh; in the second two races he was ridden by Paul Townend.

Al Boum Photo began the 2017/18 season by winning a minor steeplechase at Navan Racecourse, his first outing over fences. His next race was the Grade 2 Novice Chase at Limerick on 26 December 2017. Ridden by David Mullins, he fell when leading at the last. He was then narrowly beaten into second place in his first Grade 1 race, the Novice Chase at Leopardstown. In March 2018 Al Boum Photo made his first appearance at the Cheltenham Festival, where he was ridden by Walsh in the Novices' Chase and fell at the second last. On 1 April 2018 he won the Ryanair Gold Cup, ridden by Mullins. His final race of the season, the Champion Novices Chase at the Punchestown Festival, ended in a bizarre incident when he was in the lead approaching the last and jockey Townend mistakenly thought the fence had to be bypassed.

Al Boum Photo made only three appearances in the 2018/19 season. Ridden by Walsh, he won the Savills Chase at Tramore on 1 January 2019. His next race was the Cheltenham Gold Cup. Starting at 12/1 in a field of sixteen, he gave Mullins a long-awaited first victory in the race. It was also a first success in the race for jockey Townend, who would go on to partner Al Boum Photo in all his future races except for one. Al Boum Photo ended the season with second place in the Punchestown Gold Cup, beaten two lengths by stablemate Kemboy.

In the 2019/20 season, Al Boum Photo made only two appearances on the racecourse. He again comfortably won his warm-up race, the Savills Chase at Tramore on New Year's Day before he secured a victory for the second consecutive year in March 2020. On this occasion he started as 100/3 favourite and beat Santini by a neck.

The 2020/21 season took a familiar course with a comfortable win at Tramore followed by appearances in the Cheltenham and Punchestown Gold Cups. Starting as 9/4 favourite at Cheltenham, he came third behind Minella Indo and A Plus Tard. At Punchestown he again started as favourite, and was beaten one-and-a-half lengths into second place by Clan des Obeaux.

In the 2021/22 season Al Boum Photo was entered for the same three races, resulting in a fourth consecutive win in the Savills Chase at Tramore, and sixth and third places in the Gold Cups at Cheltenham and Punchestown. In the Punchestown Gold Cup he was ridden by Bryan Cooper while his regular jockey Townend took the ride on favourite and winner Allaho. The season ended with a trip to France to compete in the Grand Steeple-Chase de Paris at Auteuil on 22 May 2022. Al Boum Photo was pulled up after jumping the third-last fence.

In June 2022 Mullins announced that Al Boum Photo had been retired from racing and, together with stablemate Melon, was going be trained for eventing.

== Pedigree ==
Pedigree of Al Boum Photo (FR), bay gelding 2012
Sire Buck's Boum (FR) 2005	Cadoudal (FR); 1979	Green Dancer (USA)	Nijinsky (CAN)
Sire Buck's Boum (FR) 2005	Cadoudal (FR); 1979	Green Dancer (USA)	Green Valley (FR)
Sire Buck's Boum (FR) 2005	Cadoudal (FR); 1979	Come To Sea (IRE)	Sea Hawk (FR)
Sire Buck's Boum (FR) 2005	Cadoudal (FR); 1979	Come To Sea (IRE)	Camarilla (FR)
Sire Buck's Boum (FR) 2005	Bucks (FR); 1993	Le Glorieux (GB)	Cure The Blues (USA)
Sire Buck's Boum (FR) 2005	Bucks (FR); 1993	Le Glorieux (GB)	La Mirande (FR)
Sire Buck's Boum (FR) 2005	Bucks (FR); 1993	Buckleby (GB)	Buckskin (FR)
Sire Buck's Boum (FR) 2005	Bucks (FR); 1993	Buckleby (GB)	Thereby
Dam All Gane (FR) 2005	Dom Alco (FR); 1987	Dom Pasquini	Rheffic
Dam All Gane (FR) 2005	Dom Alco (FR); 1987	Dom Pasquini	Boursonne
Dam All Gane (FR) 2005	Dom Alco (FR); 1987	Alconaca (IRE)	Nonoalco (USA)
Dam All Gane (FR) 2005	Dom Alco (FR); 1987	Alconaca (IRE)	Vela (GB)
Dam All Gane (FR) 2005	Magic Spring (FR); 1997	True Brave (USA)	Dancing Brave
Dam All Gane (FR) 2005	Magic Spring (FR); 1997	True Brave (USA)	True Lady
Dam All Gane (FR) 2005	Magic Spring (FR); 1997	Carama	Tip Moss
Dam All Gane (FR) 2005	Magic Spring (FR); 1997	Carama	Miss Jefferson (Family: 7)
