= Beat Hollow =

British-bred Thoroughbred racehorse

- Sire: Sadler's Wells
- Grandsire: Northern Dancer
- Dam: Wemyss Bight
- Damsire: Dancing Brave
- Sex: Stallion
- Foaled: March 22, 1997 (age 29)
- Country: United Kingdom
- Colour: Bay
- Breeder: Juddmonte Farms
- Owner: Juddmonte Farms
- Trainer: Henry Cecil (Europe); Robert J. Frankel (USA)
- Record: 12: 7-2-2
- Earnings: £1,235,607

Major wins
- Newmarket Stakes (2000); Grand Prix de Paris (2000); Manhattan Handicap (2002); Turf Classic Stakes (2002); Arlington Million Stakes (2002)
- Last updated on July 12, 2008

Beat Hollow (foaled March 22, 1997 in the United Kingdom) is a retired Thoroughbred racehorse who won four Group/Grade 1 races in Europe and the United States.

Trained by Henry Cecil, he was sent to the track at age two in 1999. He won his only start that year then won the Newmarket Stakes in his first start in 2000. Making just his third career start, Beat Hollow finished third to Sinndar and Sakhee in the 1½-mile Epsom Derby. He then won the Grand Prix de Paris at Longchamp Racecourse in Paris, France, a race which at that time was run at distance of 2,000 metres (1¼ miles).

Beat Hollow suffered from illness problems that kept him out of racing in 2001 but late in the year he was shipped to trainer Bobby Frankel in the United States. Back on the track as a five-year-old in 2002, Beat Hollow made eight starts on American turf. He won four races, three of which were Grade I events, plus had two second-place finishes and a third.

Retired to stud, Beat Hollow currently stands at Juddmonte's Banstead Manor Stud, near the village of Cheveley in Suffolk County. The best of his Flat race offspring to date has been Sea Moon, while his son Minella Indo won the 2021 Cheltenham Gold Cup. His son Not So Sleepy has been successful both on the flat and over hurdles, winning the 2015 Dee Stakes and, in a dead heat, the 2021 Fighting Fifth Hurdle.
