= Festival Novice Hurdle =

Hurdle horse race in Ireland

Festival Novice Hurdle
2026
He's On Fire	Generous Risk	I Started A Joke

Previous years
2025
Mr Percy	Fleur In The Park	Ballygunner Castle
2024
Captain Cody	Mossy Fen Park	Loughglynn
2023
Nick Rockett	Thecompanysergeant	Parmenion
2022
Bronn	Churchstonewarrior	Falcon Eight
2021
Ashdale Bob	Decimation	Gentlemansgame

2020-2011
2019
Dommage Pour Toi	Zero Ten	Easy Game
2018
Pallasator	Jetz	Scarpeta
2017
Al Boum Photo	Stand Up And Fight	Runfordave
2016
Acapella Bourgeois	Nambour	Our Duke
2015
Shaneshill	Outlander	On Fiddlers Green
2014
Lieutenant Colonel	Le Vent D'Antan	Azorian
2013
Mala Beach	Defy Logic	Bright New Dawn
2012
Jenari	Bridgets Pet	Lyreen Legend
2011
Lambro	Mackeys Forge	Last Instalment

2010-2001
2010
Magnanimity	Frascati Park	Whodoyouthink
2009
Oscar Dan Dan	Caim Hill	Lenabane
2008
Cooldine	Chasing Cars	Woodbine Willie
2007
Aitmatov	Davorin	Casey Jones
2006
Vic Venturi	Mounthenry	Thyne Again
2005
Sher Beau	Kill Devil Hill	Homer Wells
2004
Sadlers Wings	Point Barrow	Fairwood Present
2003
Pay It Forward	Kings Orchard	Banasan
2002
Thari	One Night Out	Perkys Pride
2001
Risk Accessor	Alpha Blues	Kadoun

2000-1992
2000
Boley Lad	Arctic Copper	Well Ridden
1999
Winter Garden	Royal Signature	Kings Banquet
1998
Verrazano Bridge	Cloone Bridge	Ferbet Junior
1997
Moscow Express	Liver Bird	Blushing Sand
1996
Macallister	Mulkev Prince	Ferrycarrigcrystal
1995
Major Rumpus	Ballyhire Lad	Stevie Be
1994
Court Melody	Love And Porter	Coq Hardi Affair
1993
Belvederian	Muir Station	Fantus
1992
Dee Ell	Shuil Ar Aghaidh	Flashing Steel

The Fairyhouse Easter Festival Novice Hurdle, currently run as the Paddy Kehoe Suspended Ceilings Novice Hurdle, is a Grade 2 National Hunt hurdle race in Ireland which is open to horses aged four years or older. It is run at Fairyhouse over a distance of 2 miles and 4½ furlongs (4,023 metres), and it is scheduled to take place each year in April. The race is usually run at the course's Easter Festival but in 2017 it was moved to a fixture in early April to avoid clashing with similar races at the Punchestown Festival.

The race was awarded Grade 2 status in 2004.

== Records ==
Leading jockey since 1992 (4 wins):

- Paul Carberry – Winter Garden (1999), Boley Lad (2000), Thari (2002), Aitmatov (2007)

Leading trainer since 1992 (9 wins):

- Willie Mullins - Sadlers Wings (2004), Cooldine (2008), Lambro (2011), Shaneshill (2015), Al Boum Photo (2017), Bronn (2022), Nick Rockett (2023), Captain Cody (2024), He's On Fire (2026)

== Winners ==
Year	Winner	Age	Jockey	Trainer
1992	Dee Ell	6	Tom Taaffe	Arthur Moore
1993	Belvederian	6	Charlie Swan	Mouse Morris
1994	Court Melody	6	Shane Broderick	Michael Hourigan
1995	Major Rumpus	7	F Woods	Arthur Moore
1996	Macallister	6	Richard Dunwoody	Victor Bowens
1997	Moscow Express	5	Charlie Swan	Aidan O'Brien
1998	Verrazano Bridge	6	Conor O'Dwyer	Tom Taaffe
1999	Winter Garden	5	Paul Carberry	Noel Meade
2000	Boley Lad	6	Paul Carberry	Noel Meade
2001	Risk Accessor	6	Charlie Swan	Christy Roche
2002	Thari	5	Paul Carberry	Noel Meade
2003	Pay It Forward	5	Timmy Murphy	Jessica Harrington
2004	Sadlers Wings	6	David Casey	Willie Mullins
2005	Sher Beau	6	David Casey	Philip Fenton
2006	Vic Venturi	6	Tony McCoy	Philip Fenton
2007	Aitmatov	6	Paul Carberry	Noel Meade
2008	Cooldine	6	Ruby Walsh	Willie Mullins
2009	Oscar Dan Dan	7	Ruby Walsh	Thomas Mullins
2010	Magnanimity	6	Davy Russell	Dessie Hughes
2011	Lambro	6	Emmet Mullins	Willie Mullins
2012	Jenari	5	Tony McCoy	Jessica Harrington
2013	Mala Beach	5	Davy Condon	Gordon Elliott
2014	Lieutenant Colonel	5	Benji O'Connell	Dessie Hughes
2015	Shaneshill	6	Ruby Walsh	Willie Mullins
2016	Acapella Bourgeois	6	Johnny Burke	Sandra Hughes
2017	Al Boum Photo	5	Paul Townend	Willie Mullins
2018	Pallasator	9	Davy Russell	Gordon Elliott
2019	Dommage Pour Toi	6	Rachael Blackmore	Henry de Bromhead
	no race 2020 (Note: The 2020 running was cancelled because of the COVID-19 pandemic in the Republic of Ireland)
2021	Ashdale Bob	6	Robbie Power	Jessica Harrington
2022	Bronn	5	Danny Mullins	Willie Mullins
2023	Nick Rockett	6	Danny Mullins	Willie Mullins
2024	Captain Cody	6	Jody Townend	Willie Mullins
2025	Mr Percy	5	JJ Slevin	Joseph O'Brien
2026	He's On Fire	5	Paul Townend	Willie Mullins

== See also ==
- Horse racing in Ireland
- List of Irish National Hunt races
