= Denny Cordell Lavarack Fillies Stakes =

Flat horse race in Ireland

Denny Cordell Lavarack Fillies' Stakes
- Class: Group 3
- Location: Gowran Park; County Kilkenny, Ireland
- Inaugurated: 1996; 30 years ago
- Race type: Flat / Thoroughbred
- Sponsor: Cordell-Lavarack family and Lanwades Stud
- Website: Gowran Park

Race information
- Distance: 1m 1f 100y (1,902 m)
- Surface: Turf
- Track: Right-handed
- Qualification: Three-years-old and up fillies and mares excluding G1 / G2 winners
- Weight: 9 st 0 lb (3yo); 9 st 5 lb (4yo+); Penalties; 5 lb if two Group 3 wins * 3 lb if one Group 3 win * * since 1 January
- Purse: €56,400 (2022); 1st: €35,400

Denny Cordell Lavarack Fillies Stakes
2026
Syzygy	Pollenca	Sindria

Previous years
2025
Faiyum	Higher Leaves	She's A Nation
2022
Paris Peacock	Kawida	Term Of Endearment
2021
Astadash	Emaniya	Sense Of Style

2020-2011
2020
Epona Plays	Etneya	Cerro Bayo
2019
Four White Socks	Snapraeceps	Tipitena
2018
Broadway	Panstarr	Snowy Winter
2017
Laganore	I'm So Fancy	Wilamina
2016
Duchess Andorra	Laganore	Intimation
2015
Jack Naylor	Easter	Outstanding
2014
Brooch	Regardez	Odeliz
2013
Mango Diva	Uleavemebreathless	Scintillula
2012
Aloof	Beatrice Aurore	Shebella
2011
Flowers Of Spring	Zaminast	Hurricane Havoc

2010-2001
2010
Shareen	She's Our Mark	Miss Laa Di Da
2009
Ave	Choose Me	Rose Hip
2008
Shreyas	She's Our Mark	Soft Morning
2007
Timarwa	Many Colours	Uimhir A Haon
2006
Race For The Stars	Blessyourpinksox	Ardbrae Lady
2005
Luas Line	Sanserif	Pictavia
2004
Cache Creek	Queen Astrid	Kisses For Me
2003
Livadiya	In The Limelight	Cache Creek
2002
Kournakova	Desert Trail	Relish
2001
Julie Jalouse	Molomo	Chiming

2000-1996
2000
Abikan	Bibi Karam	Fantasia Girl
1999
Rominten	Seasonal Style	Castle Quest
1998
Renge	Darina	Joleah
1997
Darrouzett	Token Gesture	Velour
1996
Ceirseach	Matangi	Identify

The Denny Cordell Lavarack Fillies Stakes is a Group 3 flat horse race in Ireland open to thoroughbred fillies and mares aged three years or older. It is run at Gowran Park over a distance of 1 mile, 1 furlong and 100 yards (1,902 metres), and it is scheduled to take place each year in late September.

== History ==
The event is named in memory of Denny Cordell-Lavarack (1943–95), an English record producer who became a racehorse trainer in Ireland. It was created by his family and friends, the sponsors of the race, in celebration of his life.

The race was established in 1996, and it was initially held in mid-September. It was switched to mid-October and given Listed status in 2000. It moved to August in 2004.

The race was promoted to Group 3 level in 2006 and renamed the Denny Cordell Fillies Stakes, after Cordell-Lavarack's shortened name. It returned to October the following year, and from this point it was jointly sponsored by Lanwades Stud. It has taken place in late September since 2008, from which date it reverted to its original name.

== Records ==
Most successful horse:

- no horse has won this race more than once

Leading jockey (4 wins):

- Johnny Murtagh – Darrouzett (1997), Renge (1998), Livadiya (2003), Mango Diva (2013)

Leading trainer (5 wins):

- John Oxx – Darrouzett (1997), Renge (1998), Julie Jalouse (2001), Timarwa (2007), Shareen (2010)

== Winners ==
Year	Winner	Age	Jockey	Trainer	Time
1996	Ceirseach	3	Kevin Manning	Jim Bolger	2:06.00
1997	Darrouzett	3	Johnny Murtagh	John Oxx	2:07.50
1998	Renge	4	Johnny Murtagh	John Oxx	2:10.40
1999	Rominten	3	Eddie Ahern	Michael Grassick	2:03.30
2000	Abikan	3	Kevin Manning	Jim Bolger	2:13.40
2001	Julie Jalouse	3	Fran Berry	John Oxx	2:05.00
2002	Kournakova	3	Michael Kinane	Aidan O'Brien	2:02.40
2003	Livadiya	7	Johnny Murtagh	Harry Rogers	2:00.20
2004	Cache Creek	6	Fran Berry	Pat Hughes	2:05.30
2005	Luas Line	3	Wayne Lordan	David Wachman	2:02.40
2006	Race for the Stars	3	Kieren Fallon	Aidan O'Brien	2:04.00
2007	Timarwa	3	Michael Kinane	John Oxx	2:02.75
2008	Shreyas	3	Kevin Manning	Jim Bolger	2:00.16
2009	Ave	3	Richard Mullen	Sir Michael Stoute	1:58.05
2010	Shareen	3	Niall McCullagh	John Oxx	2:05.73
2011	Flowers of Spring	4	Chris Hayes	Andrew Oliver	1:58.93
2012	Aloof	3	Billy Lee	David Wachman	2:00.27
2013	Mango Diva	3	Johnny Murtagh	Michael Stoute	1:59.69
2014	Brooch	3	Pat Smullen	Dermot Weld	2:00.62
2015	Jack Naylor	3	Fran Berry	Jessica Harrington	2:00.43
2016	Duchess Andorra	5	Colin Keane	Johnny Murtagh	2:07.34
2017	Laganore	5	Colin Keane	Tony Martin	2:06.67
2018	Broadway	3	Seamie Heffernan	Aidan O'Brien	2:05.01
2019	Four White Socks	4	Declan McDonogh	Joseph Tuite	2:04.92
2020	Epona Plays	3	Billy Lee	Willie McCreery	2:02.78
2021	Astadash	4	Wayne Lordan	Jessica Harrington	2:00.34
2022	Paris Peacock	3	Shane Foley	Jessica Harrington	2:01.03
2023	Maxux (Note: The 2023 race was run at Fairyhouse)	3	Mikey Sheehy	Joseph O'Brien	1:59.44
2024	Je Zous	3	Dylan Browne McMonagle	Joseph O'Brien	2:00.53
2025	Faiyum	3	Colin Keane	Ger Lyons	2:04.87
2026	Sygyzy	4	Scott McLoughlin	Daniel McLoughlin	2:06.33

== See also ==
- Horse racing in Ireland
- List of Irish flat horse races
