= Vintage Tipple =

Irish-bred Thoroughbred racehorse

- Sire: Entrepreneur
- Grandsire: Sadler's Wells
- Dam: Overruled
- Damsire: Last Tycoon
- Sex: Mare
- Foaled: 17 January 2000
- Country: Ireland
- Colour: Bay
- Breeder: Edmund Loder
- Owner: Patrick J O'Donovan
- Trainer: Paddy Mullins
- Record: 6: 3-1-0

Major wins
- Irish Oaks (2003)

Honours
- Vintage Tipple Stakes at Gowran Park Racecourse

Vintage Tipple (foaled 17 January 2000) is an Irish Thoroughbred racehorse and broodmare. She showed considerable promise as a two-year-old in 2002 when she won both of her races by clear margins. In the following spring she finished second in the Athasi Stakes and then returned from a lengthy absence to record her biggest win when she defeated a strong field to win the Irish Oaks. She was well beaten in her last two races and was retired from racing at the end of the season. As a broodmare she has produced several minor winners.

== Background ==
Vintage Tipple is a bay mare with a small white star bred in Ireland by Edmund Loder at the family's Eyresfield Stud near the Curragh in County Kildare. In February 2002 the two-year-old filly was put up for auction at Goffs and was sold for €16,500. She entered the ownership of Patrick J O'Donovan and was sent into training with the veteran Paddy Mullins at Goresbridge, County Kilkenny.

She was one of the best horses sired by Entrepreneur who won the 2000 Guineas in 1997. He was not a success as a breeding stallion and was exported to Japan in 2002. Her dam Overruled showed some racing ability, winning minor races at Doncaster in 1995 and Chepstow in 1996. Her dam Overcall was a granddaughter of Melodramatic, whose other descendants have included Vintage Crop.

== Racing career ==
=== 2002: two-year-old season ===
Vintage Tipple was ridden in both of her races as a two-year-old by Johnny Murtagh. She made her racecourse debut in a maiden race over one mile at Tralee Racecourse on 27 August and started at odds of 11/2 in a seventeen-runner field. After being restrained at the rear of the field she made rapid progress in the straight, took the lead a furlong from the finish, and drew clear to win by three lengths from the Jim Bolger-trained Solas Mo Chroi. On 14 September the filly was dropped in distance for a minor stakes race over seven furlongs at the Curragh and started 5/4 favourite against five opponents. She started slowly but took the lead a furlong out and accelerated away from her rivals to win by four lengths in "impressive" style.

=== 2003: three-year-old season ===
Vintage Tipple was ridden by Jamie Spencer when she began her second season in the Group 3 Athasi Stakes over seven furlongs at the Curragh. Starting at odds of 5/2 she kept on well in the closing stages to finish second, two lengths behind the Round Tower Stakes-winner Walayef. After the race she was found to have sustained a hairline fracture to her cannon bone.

The filly was off the track for two and a half months before being moved up in class and distance for the Irish Oaks over one and a half miles at the Curragh on 13 July. The eleven-runner field appeared to be a strong one with Yesterday starting favourite ahead of Spanish Sun (Ribblesdale Stakes), Ocean Silk (Lupe Stakes), Casual Look, and Snippets (Noblesse Stakes), with Vintage Tipple next in the betting on 12/1 alongside Hanami (Pretty Polly Stakes). The outsider L'Ancresse set the pace with Vintage Tipple, ridden by Frankie Dettori tracking the leaders and turning into the straight in fifth place. She made steady progress in the last quarter mile, overtook L'Ancresse inside the final furlong and won by one and a half lengths with Casual Look a head away in third and Yesterday in fourth place. After the race Dettori said "the further she went, the stronger she got. When I turned round a furlong out I couldn't believe we would win so easily". Her 84-year old trainer commented "she's a very good filly", the trainer said. "She just had the one hiccough, but she came through it well. If she stays lucky, the sky's the limit for her".

On 6 September Vintage Tipple was matched against male opposition in the Irish Champion Stakes over ten furlongs at Leopardstown. Ridden by Pat Smullen she never looked likely to win and finished last of the seven runners, more than thirty lengths behind the winner High Chaparral. On her final start she was dropped back to Listed class for the Finale Stakes at the Curragh in October, but failed to reproduce her summer form and finished sixth of the eleven runners behind L'Ancresse.

== Breeding record ==
After her retirement from racing Vintage Tipple became a broodmare for her owner Pat O'Donovan. She has produced at least nine foals and four winners:

- Pearl Trader, a chestnut filly, foaled in 2005, sired by Dubai Destination. Failed to win in five races.
- Cape Vintage, bay filly, 2006, by Cape Cross. Won two races.
- Kings Vintage, bay filly, 2007, by King's Best. Won one race.
- Achillion, bay colt (later gelded), 2006, by Cape Cross. Unplaced on only start.
- Venegazzu, brown colt, 2009, by Dubawi. Won two races.
- Noble Bacchus, bay colt, 2010, by Acclamation. Failed to win in fourteen races.
- Athassel Abbey, bay filly, 2012, by Fastnet Rock. Won one race.
- Jamaica Inn, bay filly, 2013, by Fastnet Rock. Failed to win in three races.
- Lady Burn, filly, 2014, by Fastnet Rock

== Pedigree ==
Pedigree of Vintage Tipple (IRE), bay mare, 2000
Sire Entrepreneur (GB) 1994	Sadler's Wells (USA); 1981	Northern Dancer	Nearctic
Sire Entrepreneur (GB) 1994	Sadler's Wells (USA); 1981	Northern Dancer	Natalma
Sire Entrepreneur (GB) 1994	Sadler's Wells (USA); 1981	Fairy Bridge	Bold Reason
Sire Entrepreneur (GB) 1994	Sadler's Wells (USA); 1981	Fairy Bridge	Special
Sire Entrepreneur (GB) 1994	Exclusive Order (USA); 1979	Exclusive Native	Raise a Native
Sire Entrepreneur (GB) 1994	Exclusive Order (USA); 1979	Exclusive Native	Exclusive
Sire Entrepreneur (GB) 1994	Exclusive Order (USA); 1979	Bonavista	Dead Ahead
Sire Entrepreneur (GB) 1994	Exclusive Order (USA); 1979	Bonavista	Ribotina
Dam Overruled (IRE) 1993	Last Tycoon (IRE); 1983	Try My Best	Northern Dancer
Dam Overruled (IRE) 1993	Last Tycoon (IRE); 1983	Try My Best	Sex Appeal
Dam Overruled (IRE) 1993	Last Tycoon (IRE); 1983	Mill Princess	Mill Reef
Dam Overruled (IRE) 1993	Last Tycoon (IRE); 1983	Mill Princess	Irish Lass
Dam Overruled (IRE) 1993	Overcall (GB); 1984	Bustino	Busted
Dam Overruled (IRE) 1993	Overcall (GB); 1984	Bustino	Ship Yard
Dam Overruled (IRE) 1993	Overcall (GB); 1984	Melodramatic	Tudor Melody
Dam Overruled (IRE) 1993	Overcall (GB); 1984	Melodramatic	Irish Flight (Family 14-c)
