= Oyster Stakes =

Flat horse race in Ireland

- Class: Listed
- Location: Ballybrit Racecourse; County Galway, Ireland
- Race type: Flat / Thoroughbred
- Sponsor: Ardilaun Hotel
- Website: Galway Races

Race information
- Distance: 1m 4f 42y (2,452 metres)
- Surface: Turf
- Track: Right-handed
- Qualification: Three-years-old and up fillies and mares Excluding Group race winners
- Weight: 9 st 0 lb (3yo); 9 st 7 lb (4yo+); Penalties; 5 lb for two Listed wins * 3 lb for one Listed win * * since 1 January 1
- Purse: €37,600 (2022); 1st: €23,600

Oyster Stakes
2026
Beset	Chablis Rock	Galileo Dame

Previous years
2025
La Isla Mujeres	Bonnie Moon	Island Hopping
2024
Beechwood	Rouge Sellier	Romzina
2023
Thunder Roll	Enfranchise	Echoes In Rain
2022
Yaxeni	Azallya	Thanks Monica
2021
Haparanda	Woodland Garden	Merroir

2020-2011
2020
Princess Zoe	Barrington Court	Ennistymon
2019
Diamond Hill	Camphor	Warnaq
2018
Baby Pink	Princess Yaiza	Morga
2017
Airlie Beach	Remarkable Lady	Red Stars
2016
Almela	Morga	Fact Or Folklore
2015
Zhukova	Almela	Ebayya
2014
Tarana	Altesse	Beyond Brilliance
2013
Missunited	Eye of The Storm	Inis Meain
2012
Chamonix	Demurely	Midnight Music
2011
Zanughan	Spin	Address Unknown

2010-2001
2010
Rajik	Address Unknown	Syann
2009
Aliyfa	The Bull Hayes	Allied Powers
2008
Honoria	Via Galilei	Ghimaar
2007
Hasanka	Ezima	Red Moloney
2006
Rockall Blizzard	Be My Queen	Akarem
2005
Blue Corrig	Sweet Firebird	Good Surprise
2004
Royal Devotion	Orpington	Arch Rebel
2003
Chartres	Behrasia	Mobasher
2002
Bowmore	Mutakarrim	Sadlers Wings
2001
Mutakarrim	Affianced	Taraza

2000-1991
2000
Dolydille	Jammaal	Reve Russe
1999
Theatreworld	Maid Of Killeen	General Cloney
1998
Yavana's Pace	Golden Rule	Enzeli
1997
Aliya	Vivo	Mohaajir
1996
Predappio	I'm Supposin	Fill The Bill
1995
Russian Snows	Ballykett Nancy	Double On
1994
Ballykett Nancy	Karikata	Blazing Spectacle
1993
Alouette	Tarakana	Judicial Field
1992
Ebaziya	Onesixnine	Mirana
1991
Judicial	Thornberry	Scrupulous

The Oyster Stakes is a Listed flat horse race in Ireland open to thoroughbred fillies and mares aged three years or older. It is run at Galway over a distance of 1 mile 4 furlongs and 42 yards (2,452 metres), and it is scheduled to take place each year in September.

The race was first run in 1991.

== Records ==
Leading jockey (4 wins):

- Michael Kinane– Russian Snows (1995), Theatreworld (1999), Hasanka (2007), Aliyfa (2009)
- Johnny Murtagh– Predappio (1996), Bowmore (2002), Chartres (2003), Zanughan (2011)
- Pat Smullen - Aliya (1997), Mutakarrim (2001), Almela (2016), Airlie Beach (2017)

Leading trainer (10 wins):

- John Oxx – Ebaziya (1992), Russian Snows (1995), Predappio (1996), Aliya (1997), Bowmore (2002), Chartres (2003), Hasanka (2007), Aliyfa (2009), Zanughan (2011), Tarana (2014)

== Winners ==
Year	Winner	Age	Jockey	Trainer	Time
1991	Judicial	4	Kevin Manning	Michael Grassick	2:25.60
1992	Ebaziya	3	Richard Hughes	John Oxx	2:37.10
1993	Alouette	3	Christy Roche	Jim Bolger	2:41.30
1994	Ballykett Nancy	3	Kevin Manning	Jim Bolger	2:40.00
1995	Russian Snows	3	Michael Kinane	John Oxx	2:35.60
1996	Predappio	3	Johnny Murtagh	John Oxx	2:39.10
1997	Aliya	3	Pat Smullen	John Oxx	2:42.30
1998	Yavana's Pace	6	Darryll Holland	Mark Johnston	2:57.40
1999	Theatreworld	7	Michael Kinane	Aidan O'Brien	2:47.90
2000	Dolydille	4	Kevin Manning	Jim Bolger	2:38.40
2001	Mutakarrim	4	Pat Smullen	Dermot Weld	2:34.30
2002	Bowmore	3	Johnny Murtagh	John Oxx	2:50.10
2003	Chartres	4	Johnny Murtagh	John Oxx	2:36.70
2004	Royal Devotion	4	Tadgh O'Shea	Michael Halford	2:39.20
2005	Blue Corrig	5	Seamie Heffernan	Joe Crowley	2:36.90
2006	Rockall Blizzard	3	Niall Madden	Noel Meade	2:36.10
2007	Hasanka	3	Michael Kinane	John Oxx	2:36.40
2008	Honoria	3	Seamie Heffernan	Aidan O'Brien	2:47.72
2009	Aliyfa	3	Michael Kinane	John Oxx	3:03.82
2010	Rajik	5	Declan McDonogh	Charlie Swan	2:44.48
2011	Zanughan	3	Johnny Murtagh	John Oxx	2:34.66
2012	Chamonix	3	Joseph O'Brien	Aidan O'Brien	2:56.67
2013	Missunited	6	Seamie Heffernan	Michael Winters	2:39.32
2014	Tarana	4	Declan McDonogh	John Oxx	2:37.19
2015	Zhukova	3	Leigh Roche	Dermot Weld	2:41.94
2016	Almela	4	Pat Smullen	Dermot Weld	2:43.47
2017	Airlie Beach	7	Pat Smullen	Willie Mullins	2:45.97
2018	Baby Pink	3	Niall McCullagh	Joseph O'Brien	2:50.91
2019	Diamond Hill	6	Colin Keane	Willie Mullins	2:46.74
2020	Princess Zoe	5	Joey Sheridan	Anthony Mullins	2:53.66
2021	Haparanda	4	Colin Keane	Dermot Weld	2:41.92
2022	Yaxeni	5	Colin Keane	Ger Lyons	2:45.24
2023	Thunder Roll	3	Dylan Browne McMonagle	Joseph O'Brien	2:43.44
2024	Beechwood	4	Billy Lee	Paddy Twomey	2:36.96
2025	La Isla Mujeres	5	Billy Lee	Paddy Twomey	2:40.81
2026	Beset	5	Declan McDonogh	Joseph O'Brien	2:45.66

== See also ==
- Horse racing in Ireland
- List of Irish flat horse races
