= Nicky Hartery =

Irish businessman (born 1951)

- Born: Nicholas Hartery; May 1951 (age 74)
- Occupations: Chairman, CRH plc
- Board member of: CRH plc Musgrave Group; Eircom; Horse Racing Ireland (chairman)

Nicholas Hartery (born May 1951) is an Irish businessman, the chairman of CRH plc.

Hartery has been the Chairman of CRH plc since 2012 and a board member since 2004, and a non-executive director of Musgrave Group and Eircom. He is the current chairman of Horse Racing Ireland, having been appointed for a five-year term in May 2018.
