= 2021 Cheltenham Gold Cup =

- Cheltenham Gold Cup
- Location: Cheltenham Racecourse
- Date: 19 March 2021
- Winning horse: Minella Indo
- Starting price: 9/1
- Jockey: Jack Kennedy
- Trainer: Henry de Bromhead
- Owner: Barry Maloney
- Conditions: Good to Soft

The 2021 Cheltenham Gold Cup (known as the WellChild Gold Cup for sponsorship reasons) was the 93rd annual running of the Cheltenham Gold Cup horse race and was held at Cheltenham Racecourse, Gloucestershire, England, on 19 March 2021.

The race was won by Minella Indo ridden by Jack Kennedy and trained by Henry de Bromhead

== Result ==
	*	Horse	Age	Jockey	Trainer ^{†}	SP
1		Minella Indo	8	Jack Kennedy	Henry de Bromhead (IRE)	9/1
2	1 1/4	A Plus Tard	7	Rachael Blackmore	Henry de Bromhead (IRE)	100/30
3	4 1/4	Al Boum Photo	9	Paul Townend	Willie Mullins (IRE)	9/4 F
4	24	Native River	11	Richard Johnson	Colin Tizzard	12/1
5	4 1/4	Frodon	9	Bryony Frost	Paul Nicholls	16/1
6	15	Royale Pagaille	7	Charlie Deutsch	Venetia Williams	14/1
7	3	Black Op	10	Tom Scudamore	Tom George	125/1
8	1/2	Aso	10	Daryl Jacob	Venetia Williams	150/1
9	33	Kemboy	9	Danny Mullins	Willie Mullins (IRE)	16/1
PU		Santini	9	Aidan Coleman	Nicky Henderson	12/1
PU		Champ	9	Nico de Boinville	Nicky Henderson	13/2
F		Lostintranslation	9	Robbie Power	Colin Tizzard	40/1

* The distances between the horses are shown in lengths
† Trainers are based in Great Britain unless indicated. PU = pulled-up. F = fell

== Details ==
- Sponsor: WellChild
- Winner's prize money:
- Going: Good to Soft
- Number of runners: 12
- Winner's time: 6 min 45.35 sec
