= 2019 Cheltenham Gold Cup =

- Cheltenham Gold Cup
- Location: Cheltenham Racecourse
- Date: 15 March 2019
- Winning horse: Al Boum Photo,
- Starting price: 12/1
- Jockey: Paul Townend
- Trainer: Willie Mullins
- Owner: Mrs J Donnelly
- Conditions: Good to Soft

The 2019 Cheltenham Gold Cup (known as the Magners Gold Cup for sponsorship reasons) was the 91st annual running of the Cheltenham Gold Cup horse race and was held at Cheltenham Racecourse, Gloucestershire, England, on 15 March 2019.

The race was won by Al Boum Photo, ridden by Paul Townend and trained by Willie Mullins.

Invitation Only ridden by Patrick Mullins suffered a fatal injury after a fall during the race.

== Details ==
- Sponsor: Magners
- Winner's prize money: £351,687.50
- Going: Good to Soft
- Number of runners: 16
- Winner's time: 6m 39.06s
