= Tralee Racecourse =

Horse racing venue in Tralee, Ireland

- Ráschúrsa Thrá Lí
- Location within Ireland
- Address: Ireland
- Coordinates: 52°16′40″N 9°40′25″W
- Type: Horse racing track

Tralee Racecourse was a horse racing venue in Tralee, County Kerry, Ireland. It was located at Ballybeggan Park about two miles to the north east of Tralee town centre. It ceased to operate in 2008 with fixtures transferred to other racecourses.

Ballybeggan Park (formerly a deer park owned by the family of Daniel O’Connell) became the permanent site of Tralee Racecourse in 1898. The racecourse hosted a week long meeting annually in late August as part of the Rose of Tralee International Festival. Many well known racehorses have been successful here including Dawn Run (ridden by her then 62-year-old owner, Charmian Hill), Vintage Crop, Desert King, Monty's Pass, Vintage Tipple and Alexandrova. There was also a nine hole golf course within the racecourse but this was closed in 2001.

On 6 June 1921, during the Irish War of Independence it was the site of an IRA court martial of a former British Army soldier, John Fitzgerald, accused of espionage for the Black and Tans; he was found guilty and executed, shot through both eyes.

In the early 2000s as the declining standard of facilities at the venue contributed to falling attendances the long-term viability of the racecourse was in doubt. In the Celtic Tiger period of economic boom in Ireland the racecourse land became a valuable landbank. In 2007 a majority of the shareholders in the company that owned the racecourse voted to sell it to a property development consortium. The last fixture took place on 1 October 2008 and the final horse race run at Tralee Racecourse was the Denny Havasnack (Q.R.) Race over two miles and one furlong won by 'P'Tit Fute'. The Post-2008 Irish economic downturn meant development plans for the racecourse site were never realised and it has since hosted other equestrian events such as point-to-point meetings and pony racing.
