= Vintage Tipple Stakes =

Flat horse race in Ireland

- Class: Listed
- Location: Gowran Park; County Kilkenny, Ireland
- Race type: Flat / Thoroughbred
- Sponsor: Irish Stallion Farms
- Website: Gowran Park

Race information
- Distance: 1m 6f (2,816 metres)
- Surface: Turf
- Track: Right-handed
- Qualification: Four-years-old and up fillies and mares
- Weight: 9 st 2 lb Penalties; 7 lb for G1 / G2 winners 5 lb for G3 winners 3 lb for Listed winners in races of 11 furlongs or longer since 1 June last year
- Purse: €47,000 (2023); 1st: €29,500

Vintage Tipple Stakes
2026
Moody	Snapretend	Dippedinmoonlight

Previous years
2025
Goodie Two Shoes	Fairy Wings	Joupe
2024
Enfranchise	Countess Of Tyrone	Joupe
2023
Final Gesture	Joupe	White Caviar
2022
Yaxeni	Pita Pinta	Mighty Blue
2021
Mighty Blue	Lismore	Yaxeni

2020-2018
2020
Kastasa	Nan Yehi	Traisha
2019
True Self	Jaega	Bongiorno
2018
Bloomfield	Glamorous Approach	Remarkable Lady

The Vintage Tipple Stakes is a Listed flat horse race in Ireland open to thoroughbred fillies and mares aged four years or older. It is run at Gowran Park over a distance of 1 mile and 6 furlongs (2,816 metres), and it is scheduled to take place each year in May.

The race was introduced as a new Listed race in 2018. It is named after Vintage Tipple, an Irish-trained filly who won the 2003 Irish St. Leger.

== Records ==
Leading jockey (2 wins):

- Colin Keane – True Self (2019), Yaxeni (2022)
- Billy Lee – Bloomfield (2018), Final Gesture (2023)
- Dylan Browne McMonagle - Mighty Blue (2021), Goodie Two Shoes (2025)

Leading trainer (2 wins):

- Joseph O'Brien - Mighty Blue (2021), Goodie Two Shoes (2025)

== Winners ==
Year	Winner	Age	Jockey	Trainer	Time
2018	Bloomfield	4	Billy Lee	Willie McCreery	3:21.47
2019	True Self	6	Colin Keane	Willie Mullins	3:07.13
2020	Kastasa (Note: The 2020 race was run in July due to the COVID-19 pandemic in the Republic of Ireland)	4	Oisin Orr	Dermot Weld	3:04.79
2021	Mighty Blue	5	Dylan Browne McMonagle	Joseph O'Brien	3:07.14
2022	Yaxeni	5	Colin Keane	Ger Lyons	3:02.59
2023	Final Gesture	4	Billy Lee	Paddy Twomey	3:05.16
2024	Enfranchise	6	Gavin Ryan	Shark Hanlon	3:24.12
2025	Goodie Two Shoes	6	Dylan Browne McMonagle	Joseph O'Brien	2:56.56
2026	Moody	4	Billy Lee	Paddy Twomey	3:03:72

== See also ==
- Horse racing in Ireland
- List of Irish flat horse races
