= Quevega Mares Hurdle =

Hurdle horse race in Ireland

Quevega Mares Hurdle
2026
Grainne A Chroi	World Of Fortunes	Kilbarry Saint

Previous years
2025
Jade De Grugy	Mousey Brown	Gaoth Chuil
2024
Hispanic Moon	Saylavee	Gala Marceau
2023
Queens Brook	Anna Bunina	Brandy Love
2022
Burning Victory	Queens Brook	Dysart Diamond
2021
Black Tears	The Getaway Star	Darrens Hope

2020-2017
2020
Elfile	Black Tears	Laurina
2019
Laurina	Stormy Ireland	Slowmotion
2018
Meri Devie	Alletrix	Alighting
2017
Limini	Apple's Jade	Rock On The Moor

The Quevega Mares Hurdle is a Grade 3 National Hunt hurdle race in Ireland which is open to mares aged four years or older. It is run at Punchestown Racecourse over a distance of about 2 miles and 4 furlongs (4,023 metres), and during its running there are twelve hurdles to be jumped. The race is scheduled to take place each year in February.

The race is named after the great racing mare, Quevega, trained by Willie Mullins, who won the David Nicholson Mares' Hurdle six times. It was first run in 2017 and had Listed status. It was awarded Grade 3 status in 2020.

== Records ==
Most successful jockey (2 wins):

- Ruby Walsh – Limini (2017), Laurina (2019)
- Paul Townend - Burning Victory (2022), Jade De Grugy (2025)

Most successful trainer (6 wins):

- Willie Mullins – Limini (2017), Meri Devie (2018), Laurina (2019), Elfile (2020), Burning Victory (2022), Jade De Grugy (2025)

== Winners ==
Year	Winner	Age	Jockey	Trainer
2017	Limini	6	Ruby Walsh	Willie Mullins
2018	Meri Devie	5	David Mullins	Willie Mullins
2019	Laurina	6	Ruby Walsh	Willie Mullins
2020	Elfile	6	Danny Mullins	Willie Mullins
2021	Black Tears	7	Jack Kennedy	Gordon Elliott
2022	Burning Victory	6	Paul Townend	Willie Mullins
2023	Queens Brook	8	Jordan Gainford	Gordon Elliott
2024	Hispanic Moon	7	Darragh O'Keefe	Henry de Bromhead
2025	Jade De Grugy	6	Paul Townend	Willie Mullins
2026	Grainne A Chroi	7	John Shinnick	Marie Harding

== See also ==
- List of Irish National Hunt races
