= WellChild =

British children's charity

WellChild is a charity that provides care for seriously ill children and young people in the United Kingdom, founded in 1977.

== History ==
The charity was founded in 1977 with the name "Kidney" to fund research into kidney disease by someone whose friend's daughter died of it. "Kidney" later changed its name to "Children Nationwide Medical Research Foundation", and supported more areas of paediatric research.

The charity was renamed "WellChild" in 2003 and began to offer more support to sick and seriously ill children, including children's nurses and the Helping Hands projects.

=== COVID-19 ===
During the 2020 Coronavirus outbreak, the charity launched a direct response service to source and deliver Personal Protective Equipment (PPE) for families caring for seriously ill children at home. The service also provided advice on how to access food and medicine deliveries.

== Activities ==
WellChild works with the children and the families of children with various long-term and complex health conditions.

The charity introduced and funds WellChild Nurses, who provide care and support to children and young people needing long-term or complex care, helping children to leave hospital and be cared for at home.

The charity also operates Helping Hands, a home improvement scheme which, with the support of volunteer teams from local companies and organisations, provides home and garden improvement projects to make homes more suitable for their needs. The group also invests in children's health research and projects, hosts online and face-to-face groups for families, campaigns on behalf of ill children and support professionals, and supports families who have children with the rare genetic condition Wolfram syndrome.

== Patron and ambassadors ==
WellChild's patron is Prince Harry. It is one of the four charities which Harry and his wife chose to ask people to donate to instead of sending gifts for their newborn baby in 2019. The charity also has a number of celebrity ambassadors and friends.

== Awards ==
WellChild Awards is an annual event in London, hosted by celebrities and ambassadors hosting the event who present awards to the winners. Prince Harry usually attends and meets the winners. In 2015 the television programme Good Morning Britain had their own category in the awards called "Good Morning Britain's Young Hero Award 2015", which they opened for public nominations.
