= Turf Club (Ireland) =

The Turf Club was the regulatory body for horse racing in Ireland until 31 December 2017.

== History ==
The origin of the Turf Club was a regulatory body known as the Society of Sportsmen, which became The Jockey Club by 1755, before taking on its present name of the Turf Club in 1784. Despite being independent of the English Jockey Club, it did on occasion refer disputes to that organisation. A similar body for National Hunt races, the Irish National Hunt Steeplechase Committee (INHSC), was later formed under the Turf Club to ensure fair running of National Hunt meetings. (Note: Some sources place the formation of the INHSC at 1866, but this is when its British counterpart, the Grand National Hunt Committee, was recognised by the Jockey Club)

== Activities ==
The Turf Club regulated both Flat and National Hunt racing in Ireland. One of the main functions of the club was the provision of stewards to implement Rules of Racing during races. Its remit includes both the Republic of Ireland and Northern Ireland, and it has members on the board of Horse Racing Ireland. The Turf Club's regulatory work was transferred to a new limited liability company, the Irish Horseracing Regulatory Board, from 1 January 2018.

== See also ==
- Horse Racing Ireland
- Horse racing in Ireland
