= Horse racing in Ireland =

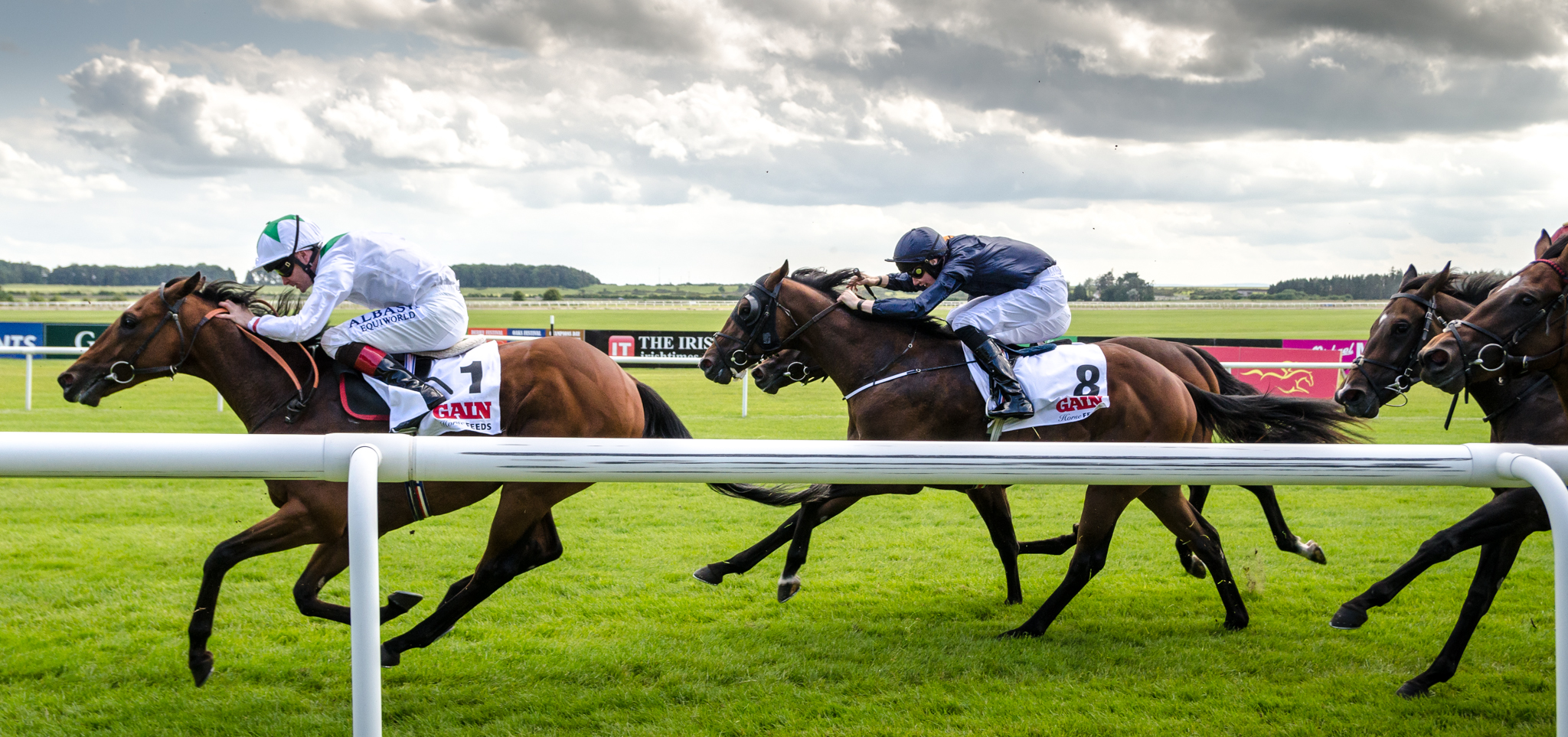
Irish Derby day, 2014, at the Curragh racecourse

Horse racing in Ireland is intricately linked with Irish culture and society. The racing of horses has a long history on the island, being mentioned in some of the earliest texts. Domestically, racing is one of Ireland's most popular spectator sports, while on the international scene, Ireland is one of the strongest producers and trainers of Thoroughbred horses. The Irish horse racing industry is closely linked with that of Great Britain, with Irish horses regularly competing and winning on the British racing circuit.

== History ==
=== Earliest records ===
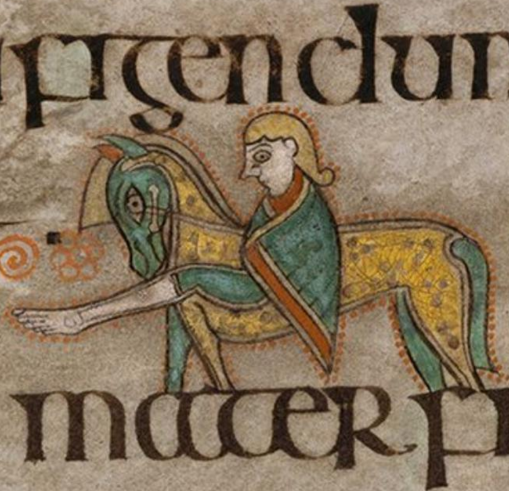
Insular style illustration of a man riding a horse, from the Book of Kells

Horse racing in Ireland has a very long history. The ancient text Togail Bruidne Dá Derga (Destruction of the Mansion of Da-Derga) mentions chariot races taking place on the Curragh during the lifetime of the monarch Conaire Mór, whose reign is disputed but is believed to have occurred sometime between 110 BC and 60 AD. The use of the Curragh as an early location for horse racing is also mentioned in a gloss to the 7th century Liber Hymnorum. The mythological Fianna were said to have enjoyed horse racing without the use of chariots; the Book of Leinster contains an early poem mentioning races at the Curragh and near Croom, as well as a tradition of racing on the beach in Kerry, a tradition which continues today. There are later mentions of "horse matches" in Galway in the 13th century under the "Kings Plate Articles".

The earliest datable evidence, however, is a 1603 royal warrant entitling the governor of Derry to hold fairs and markets at which horse races could be staged. Horse racing was evidently popular in the 17th century: a 1622 poem tells of a jockey killed participating in a horse race in Carrickfergus, while other accounts mention a 1634 race between Lord Digby and the Earl of Ormond, and the establishment in 1682 of a race by Lord Kildare, with a plate of 40 pounds to the winner. In a correspondence to King Charles II in 1673, Sir William Temple stated "Horses in Ireland are a drug... we see horses bred of excellent shape, and vigour, and size, so as to reach great prices at home, and encourage strangers to find the market here."

=== Establishment of the sport ===
Racing became more competitive with the introduction, in 1666, under King Charles II, of the King's Plate Races, designed so as to favour a fast yet strong horse, capable of winning a 4-mile race with a weight load of 12 stone. The winning horses were much sought after for breeding, leading to rapid improvement of the breed, with horses not in the winnings still capable hunters. The Curragh was awarded its plate in the 1670s, followed by the establishment in 1685 of a studbook under the Down Royal Corporation of Horse Breeders to promote the breeding of racehorses. The introduction of the Penal Laws, restricting Catholics to owning horses of a value less than £5, did little to deter horse owners, resulting in races limited to horses of that value. Race meetings were increasingly advertised in the press, and by 1750 even the English Racing Calendar advertised some 71 Irish events.

The origin of the Steeplechase was a 4.5 mile match race between Buttevant and Doneraile, County Cork, across natural countryside, beginning and ending at the eponymous steeples of each of the towns. The race, ran between locals Edmund Blake and Cornelius O'Callaghan, started a trend of racing cross-country, in a manner derived from fox hunting, with a prize replacing the quarry - a cask of wine in the original race. The early steeplechases offered little more than an agreed-upon landmarks as start and finish points, with the riders free to choose their own path, but later races used a line of flags to indicate a determined course. In the 1830s, artificial courses were laid out in numerous locations, in a similar fashion to flat racing courses, with weight allowances based on the age of the animal, a predecessor to today's National Hunt.

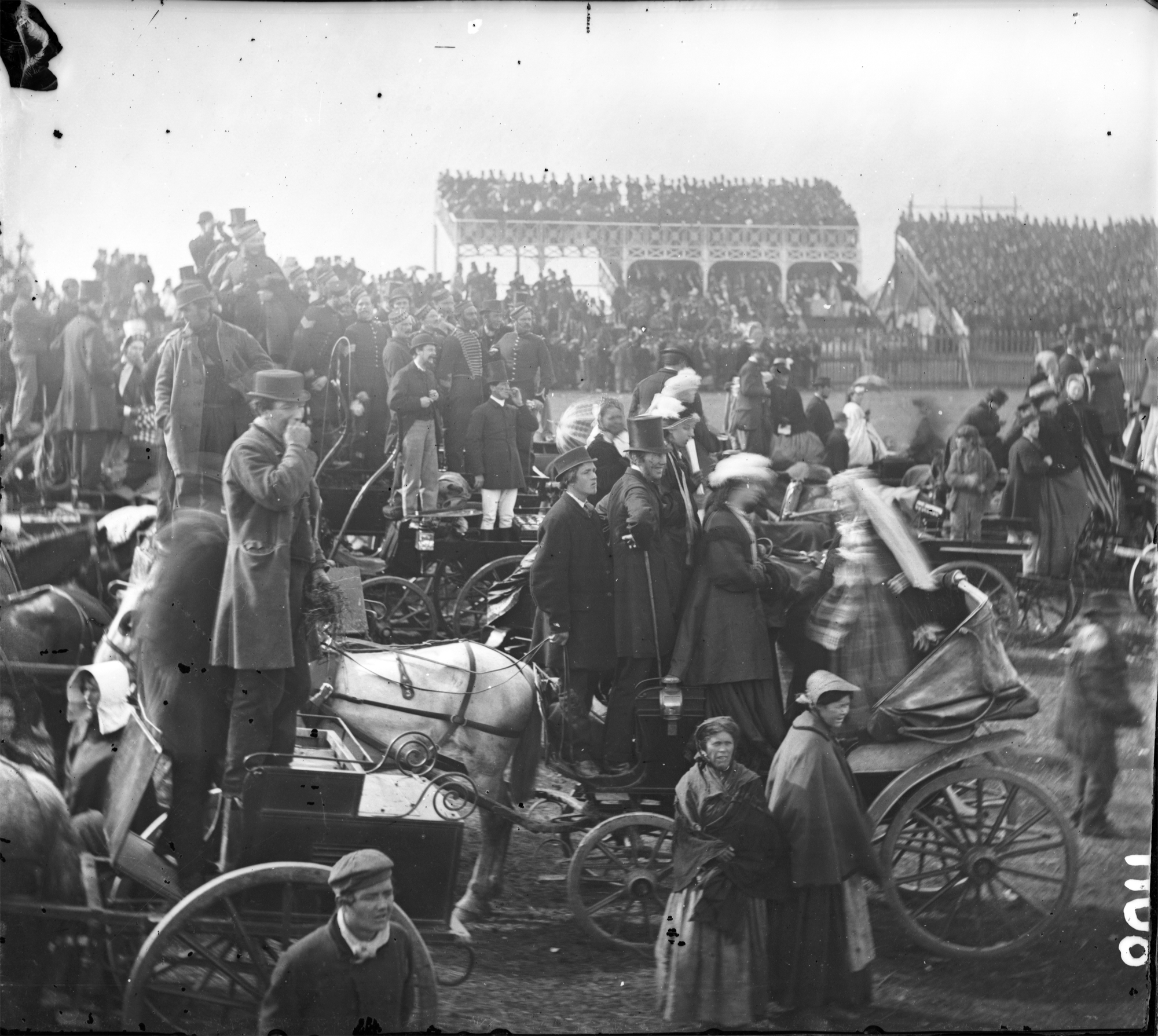
Crowd at Punchestown Festival, circa 1868

A regulatory body was initially set up as the Society of Sportsmen, changing its name to The Jockey Club by 1755, before taking on its present name of The Turf Club in 1784. Although an independent body, on occasion it referred disputes to the English Jockey Club. A similar body for National Hunt races, the Irish National Hunt Steeplechase Committee, was formed under the Turf Club to ensure fair running of National Hunt meetings. (Note: Some sources place the formation of the INHSC at 1866, but this is when its British counterpart, the Grand National Hunt Committee, was recognised by the Jockey Club)

The first recorded race meet at Laytown took place in 1868, at a time when beach races were a relatively common occurrence. The first racing festival at the Ballybrit racecourse took place in the following year, with a reported 40,000 spectators in attendance.

In the mid-19th century, the racehorse industry saw a decline linked to the aftermath of the Napoleonic wars. Economic strife led to less investment in horse breeding, and capable horses were more likely to be raced in England where the prize money was larger. However, with the expansion of the Irish rail network, racecourses sprung up in new locations, with such large numbers travelling by train to race meetings that railway companies began offering free travel to competing horses.

=== 20th century ===
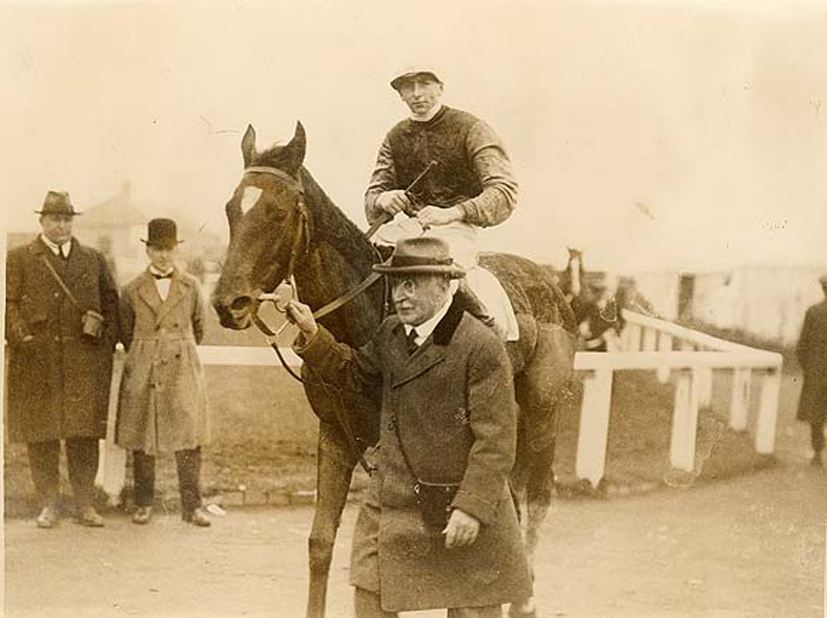
Winning Irish horse Clonespoe at the Curragh in 1924, ridden by J. Moylan

The First World War didn't initially see the cancellation of horse racing, and Thoroughbreds did not feature prominently among the 300,000 horses. Although the 1916 Rising resulted a 6-week ban on race meetings, they continued shortly afterwards. Horse racing was temporarily banned on 4 May 1917, following complaints concerning the oat intake of Thoroughbreds. The ban led to public outcry, especially in Ireland where some 20,000 people were believed to be employed in the embattled racing industry. Fearing further unrest, the British government gave a concession to allow the Curragh festival of 8–10 May, finally relenting on 20 June. In 1915, the British National Stud was based in the Curragh, becoming the Irish National Stud after independence.

In the post-independence period, many efforts were made to regulate and support the horse racing industry in Ireland, and a greater effort was made to promote Irish horses internationally. As early as 1926, the Irish Free State legislated to allow off-course betting, and the Tote was introduced in 1930 to raise funds for the industry. The Emergency that accompanied the Second World War was reportedly beneficial to horse racing, as restrictions on foreign and motor travel led to an increase in spectator numbers. The Irish Racing Board, the predecessor to Horse Racing Ireland, was set up in 1945 to oversee the economics of the industry, followed by the Irish Horse Authority in 1995 and Horse Racing Ireland in 2001.

Measures introduced by these organisations have helped the industry go from strength to strength. The Irish horse racing industry is today worth €1 billion per annum, employs over 14,000 people, and is a major player on the international scene.

== Types of racing ==
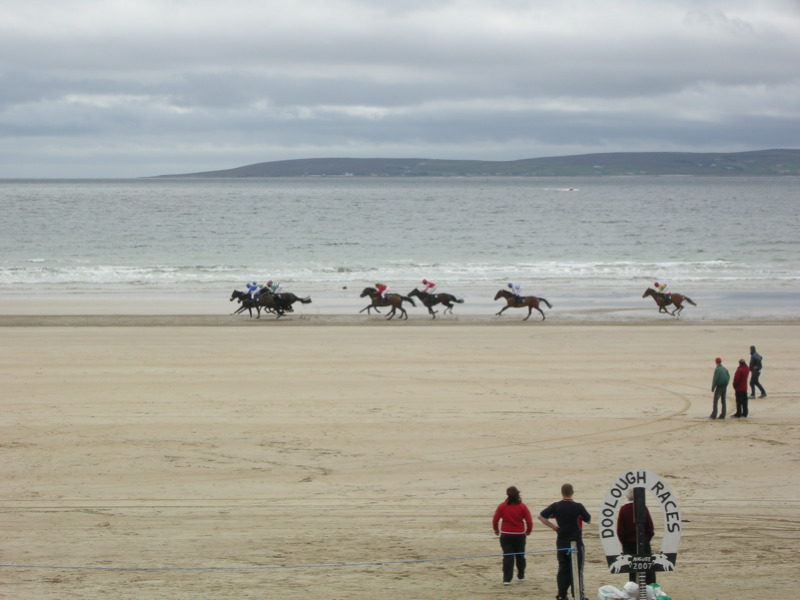
Horse racing on Doolough Beach, County Mayo as part of the Geesala Festival

=== Flat ===
In Ireland, the Flat racing season runs from mid-March to mid-November, and comprises races started from stalls, run over 5 to 20 furlongs. These races are held at 23 racecourses, of which 3 run only Flat.

=== National Hunt ===
National Hunt racing, or Jump racing, is run year-round in Ireland, but the main season takes place from November until the end of April, coinciding with the lull of the flat racing season. Run over a minimum of 2 miles, National Hunt races require the horses to clear a number of obstacles.

There are three types of National Hunt race:

- Steeplechase is run over fences varying in size and height.
- Hurdle is run over hurdles measuring 3' 1" in height.
- Point-to-point is run over farmland as opposed to on a racecourse. There are over 100 point-to-point meetings each year, mainly organised by local hunt committees with the oversight of the Turf Club. Many successful Irish National Hunt horses, including a number of Gold Cup and Grand National winners, began their careers over point-to-point courses.

Steeplechase and Hurdle races are held each year at 23 courses, of which 3 run exclusively National Hunt races.

=== Other ===
A number of other types of horse racing take place in Ireland, including Harness racing and Endurance racing.

== Racecourses ==
There are 26 major racecourses in Ireland, more per head of population than any other country, with more than 350 race meetings and 2,000 races annually. More than 1.3m people visit Irish racecourses each year, with crowds in excess of 100,000 annually attending both the Punchestown Festival in April, and the Galway Races in July. The majority of racecourses are turf, with Dundalk being the only floodlit all-weather polytrack. Laytown holds the distinction of being the only beach racecourse in the country adhering to the rules of the Turf Club, with one race meeting held each year on a natural sand track; however unaffiliated beach races are frequently held on beaches in some parts of the country.

== List of major Irish racecourses ==
Locations of horse racecourses in Ireland.
Current; Former.

Horse Racing Ireland recognises the following racecourses:

Ulster
- Downpatrick
- Down Royal

Munster

- Clonmel
- Cork
- Killarney
- Limerick
- Listowel
- Tipperary
- Tramore

Leinster

- Bellewstown
- The Curragh
- Dundalk
- Fairyhouse
- Gowran Park
- Kilbeggan
- Laytown
- Leopardstown
- Naas
- Navan
- Punchestown
- Wexford

Connacht

- Ballinrobe
- Ballybrit (Galway)
- Roscommon
- Sligo

Races have previously been held under the Rules of Racing at a number of other locations. Races were held at Tralee until 2008, when the course was sold for redevelopment. Unaffiliated races are frequently held at many locations throughout the country.

== Major festivals ==
The main races in the Irish horseracing calendar are the Irish Derby, the Irish Champion Stakes, the Irish Oaks, the Irish 1,000 Guineas and the Irish 2,000 Guineas. (Note: Listed in order of prize money, these races all appear in the 2011 list of the 380 richest horse races in the world, at positions 52, 141, 286, 357 and 358, respectively) The minimum prize money per race in Ireland is currently (2017) set at €9,000, with the highest average prize money per race in Europe. In 2016, the total prize money awarded was €56.8 million.

January / February

- Dublin Racing Festival

April

- Cork Easter Festival
- Fairyhouse Easter Festival
- Punchestown National Hunt

May

- Killarney Spring Festival
- Curragh Guineas

June

- Down Royal Ulster Derby

July

- Curragh Derby
- Bellewstown Festival
- Curragh Oaks
- Killarney July Festival
- Galway Races

August

- Tramore Festival
- Killarney August Festival

September

- Irish Champions Festival
- Listowel Races

November

- Down Royal Festival
- Punchestown Winter Racing Festival

December

- Fairyhouse Premier Jump Racing Weekend
- Leopardstown Christmas Racing Festival
- Limerick Christmas Racing Festival

== Irish Thoroughbred breeding ==
Thoroughbred breeding is an important economic activity in Ireland. There are over 43,000 Thoroughbreds in Ireland, 35% of the country's equine population; there are more horses per head of population than in any other European country. More than 80% of these Irish-bred Thoroughbreds are exported to 37 countries, generating an estimated €229 million per year; nearly 80% of these exports are to Great Britain. Ireland is the largest producer of Thoroughbreds in the EU, producing 40% of the EU's Thoroughbreds, and the fourth-largest in the world; additionally, 4 of the top 10 stallions in Europe are based in Ireland.

It has been suggested that the success of Irish Thoroughbreds, both at home and abroad, is partly due to its climate and geography; the wet, temperate climate and limestone-rich soil encourages the growth of calcium-containing grass, while the mild temperatures and lack of seasonal variability allow year-round grazing.

== Horse racing in Irish society ==
Ireland is seen by many as a "horse nation". A recurring part of Irish culture, the horse has been romanticised in art and literature for many centuries. In particular, the Thoroughbred, and horse racing in general, is seen as one of the country's main traditions:

The tradition of racing runs very deep in Ireland. It is here that steeplechasing was born; it is here that many of the most illustrious horses in racing history have been bred over the course of several centuries. In terms of geology and climate, our country is an ideal location for the raising of young horses.

— Submission by the Irish Racehorse Trainers Association to the Department of Agriculture, Food and the Marine

Thoroughbred breeding in Ireland is intricately linked with Irish rural life and community. Horse breeding and training is a key economic player in regions of the country where there are few employment opportunities. Horse race attendance is a strong contributor to tourism, with approximately 80,000 people travelling to Ireland annually to attend racing events.

== Key entities ==
=== Jockeys ===
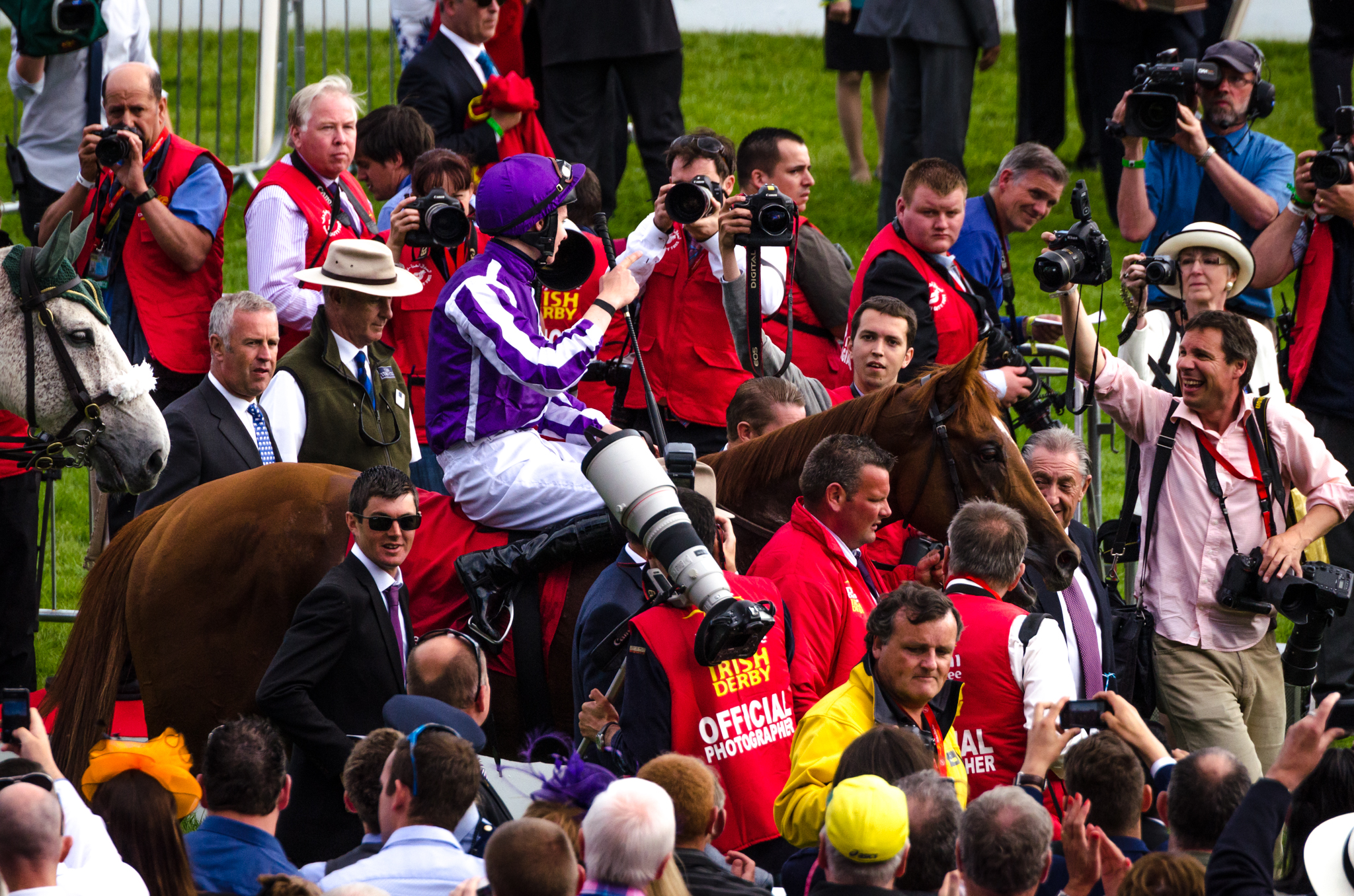
Jockey Joseph O'Brien on board Australia at the Curragh Racecourse on Irish Derby day in 2014

Dennis Fitzpatrick was the first professional Irish jockey to race in England, particularly noted for taking part in match races towards the turn of the 19th century, beginning a long history of professional Irish jockeys in the United Kingdom.

In Ireland it is not uncommon for jockeys to ride in both National Hunt and Flat races, however, the weight allowance for Flat is lower than that of National Hunt. A valid Flat or National Hunt licence must be held to ride in either type of race. Point-to-point races are open only to non-professional jockeys, who must register as "Qualified Riders" but need not meet the requirements for Flat or National Hunt licences.

=== Trainers ===
The Turf Club is responsible for licensing trainers. There are over 700 licensed trainers in the country, the majority of which are licensed to train horses for both Flat and National Hunt, although they usually specialise in one. For the duration of its training, the horse is stabled with the trainer, who is responsible for its general upkeep, as well as training.

=== Owners and breeders ===
In Ireland, racehorses may be owned solely, in partnership or in syndicate. Roughly 8,000 Thoroughbreds are born each year, with 20% of the yearly foal crop publicly auctioned by bloodstock auction houses, such as Tattersalls and Goffs. They may also be sold directly by trainers, breeders or agents. Racehorse owners are the largest source of income to the Irish racehorse industry, contributing over €400 million each year.

There are over 6,000 registered breeders in the country, 93% of which have fewer than 5 broodmares.

=== Organisations ===
Horse racing organisations are funded through a number of sources, including membership fees, taxation of betting, a foal registration levy, profits from the Tote, and direct contribution from the Government of the Republic of Ireland.

Horse Racing Ireland (HRI) was established in 2001 in an effort to promote Irish Horse racing and Thoroughbred breeding at an international level. The HRI has a number of responsibilities, including the management of the national Thoroughbred studbooks (registration with Weatherbys is also a requirement for all Irish Throughbreds), the development and operation of a number of racecourses, and the authorisation of bookmaking and funding. It is a member of the International Federation of Horseracing Authorities, the European and Mediterranean Federation of Horseracing Authorities and the European Pattern Committee.

The Turf Club, established in 1790, was the regulatory body for Horse racing in Ireland until December 2017, including both Flat and National Hunt racing, and incorporated the Irish National Hunt Steeplechase Committee (INHSC). One of the main functions was the provision of stewards to implement Rules of Racing during races. In January 2018 a new organisation, the Irish Horseracing Regulatory Board, became the regulatory body for horse racing in Ireland.

The Irish Thoroughbred Breeders' Association (ITBA) represents the Thoroughbred breeding industry both in Ireland and abroad, and is involved with a number of industry bodies. Its activities also include the monitoring of equine diseases and dissemination of veterinary information to its members.

The Irish Racehorse Trainers Association (IRTA) was founded in 1950 to represent licensed racehorse trainers in Ireland and, today, has a membership of almost 430 individuals.

The Association of Irish Racehorse Owners (AIRO) is the official representative body for racehorse owners in Ireland, and has over 1,900 members.

The Association of Irish Racecourse Owners (AIR) was established in 1964 to further the interests of racecourses and represent their owners. Its membership comprises all Irish racecourses.

The Irish Jockeys Association (IJA) represents jockeys in the industry, and is notable for running, in association with the Turf Club, the Irish Jockey's Trust, which supports jockeys and former jockeys in difficulty.

The Irish Stablestaff Association (ISSA) lobbies for improved working conditions and pay for stable staff.

== See also ==
- Horse Racing Ireland
- Horse racing in Great Britain
- List of Irish flat horse races
- List of Irish National Hunt races
- Irish flat racing Champion Jockey
- Irish jump racing Champion Jockey
- Racehorses trained in Ireland
