= Irish Horseracing Regulatory Board =

Regulatory body for horse racing in Ireland

The Irish Horseracing Regulatory Board (IHRB) is the regulatory body for the sport of horse racing in Ireland. The body, which is a limited company, took over the regulatory work previously carried out by the Turf Club and the Irish National Hunt Steeplechase Committee (INHSC) on 1 January 2018.

The IHRB is an all-Ireland body funded by Horse Racing Ireland (to the tune of €15.9 million in 2023). Its responsibilities include making and enforcing the rules of racing in Ireland, including doping control and handicapping, licensing participants in horse racing, employing officials at race meetings and representing Irish horseracing internationally. It was originally governed by a board of six directors (three nominated by the Turf Club and three by the INHSC) but since 2022 there have been an additional two independent directors on the board. Headquarters are at the Curragh.

During its early years, the IHRB faced several scandals in racing and within its own organisation. In 2021 the Board banned leading trainer Gordon Elliott for 12 months, six of which were suspended, after a photograph of him sitting on a dead horse caused widespread public revulsion. Billionaire business man, trainer and race sponsor Luke Comer was banned for three years after twelve of his horses tested positive for anabolic steroids in November 2021 in one of the biggest doping scandals in Irish racing history. In June 2023 IHRB officials appeared before the Public Accounts Committee after concerns were raised over the €384,870 termination package given to former chief executive officer (CEO) Denis Egan. At that stage CEO Darragh O'Loughlin said that there was another financial matter of "grave concern" in the 2022 accounts and that the chief financial officer (CFO) Donal O'Shea was on voluntary leave. The matter of "grave concern" was later revealed to be the transfer of €350,000 from a charity administered by IHRB into its own accounts, with the transaction reversed three months later. The CFO resigned after a year's leave.

== See also ==
- Horse racing in Ireland
