= Clonmel Racecourse =

Horse racing venue in Clonmel, Ireland

Coordinates: 52.364352°N 7.68072°W

Clonmel Racecourse (Powerstown Park) is a horse racing venue in the town of Clonmel, County Tipperary, Ireland which stages both National Hunt and Flat racing.

The course is located in the Powerstown area of the town 2 km from the town centre. It is a right handed track of one and a quarter miles with a stiff uphill finish. Racing has taken place at the venue for over 150 years. In November, the Grade 2 Clonmel Oil Chase, has been contested and won by some notable horses.

== Notable races ==
Month	DOW	Race Name	Type	Grade	Distance	Age/Sex
February	Tuesday	Mercedes-Benz Novice Hurdle	Hurdle	Grade 3	3m	4yo +
November	Thursday	Clonmel Oil Chase	Chase	Grade 2	2m 4f	5yo +
November	Thursday	T. A. Morris Memorial Mares Chase	Chase	Listed	2m 4f	5yo + m
