= Point-to-point (steeplechase) =

Form of horse racing

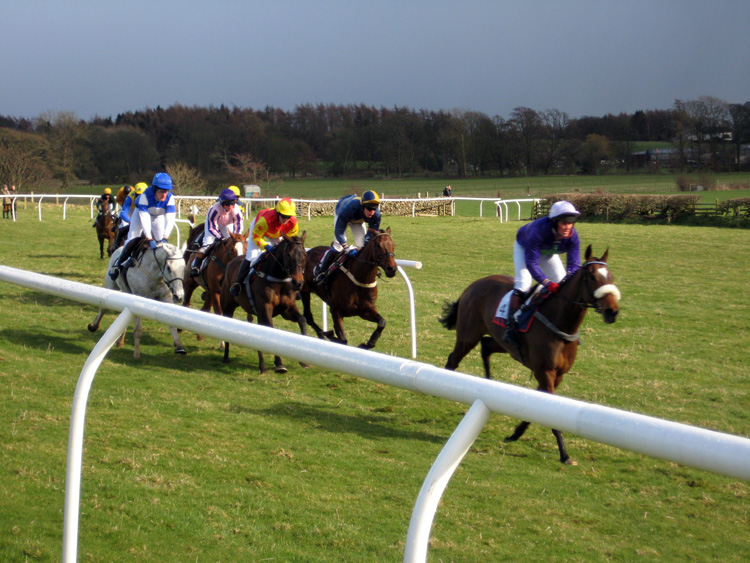
A point to point race

A point-to-point is a form of horse racing over fences for hunting horses and amateur riders. In Ireland, where the sport is open to licensed professional trainers, many of the horses will appear in these races before they compete in National Hunt races. Consequently, the Irish point-to-point tends to be used as a nursery for future young stars: a horse that wins its debut point-to-point in Ireland will often sell for a high price. Whilst professional trainers are specifically excluded from running horses (other than their own personal horses) in point-to-points in Great Britain, the days of the farmer running his hunter at the local point-to-point are gone. (They have been replaced to some extent by hunter chases). Increasingly, horses are run from "livery yards" – unlicensed but otherwise professional training establishments, sometimes closely allied with a licensed yard.

Horses running in point-to-points must be Thoroughbreds, save in the case of Hunt Members races and certain other Club Members races (e.g. Pegasus Club Members race). The owner must be a member, subscriber or farmer of a recognized pack of Hounds and must obtain a Hunter Certificate from the Master to that effect. Once this certificate has been registered with the Point-to-Point Authority (PPA), the horse is also eligible to run in Hunter Chases (races for similarly qualified horses run under BHA Rules over regulation fences on licensed racecourses). Similarly, potential riders must also obtain a Riders Qualification Certificate (RQC) from a Hunt Secretary and register it with the PPA.

Point-to-point racing is also sometimes referred to as racing 'between the flags'.

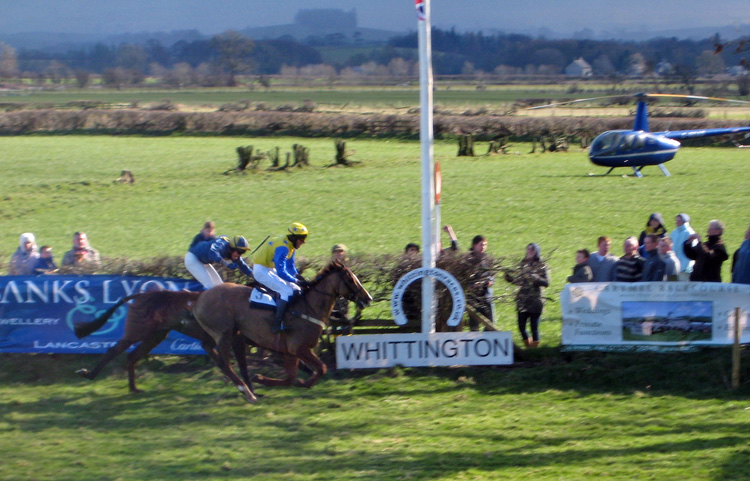
Two horses racing to the finish

== History ==
The first Steeplechase ever was run locally between Buttevant and Doneraile, County Cork, over 250 years ago. Chasing from 'steeple to steeple' or point-to-point began in 1752 when Mr Blake challenged his neighbour Mr O'Callaghan, to race across country from Buttevant church to Doneraile church some four and a half miles distance and to jump stone walls, ditches and hedges as they presented themselves. By keeping the steeple of the church in sight (steeplechasing) both riders could see their finishing point.

The first traceable use of the phrase point-to-point in connection with a horse race is in Bell's Life on 10 January 1874. A race is described that took place on 2 January from Sutton-on-the-Forest to Brandsby, held by the 9th Lancers stationed at nearby York. It was won by Langar, ridden by his owner the Hon. E. Willoughby. The first reference to a hunt holding a point-to-point came in 1875, when the Sporting Gazette contained a detailed account of a Monmouthshire Hunt Point-to-point chase held on 12 January from Llansaintfraed to Tykin-under-Little-Skirrid, which Captain Wheeley won easily from his thirteen rivals.

In Great Britain, local hunts combined in 1913 to form the Master of Hounds Point‐to‐Point Association and issue a standard set of rules. Control passed to the National Hunt Committee in the mid 1930s and The Jockey Club in the late 1960s.

In recent years, pony racing has been staged at British meetings in an attempt to encourage more young riders into point to pointing and national hunt racing.

One of the few remaining point-to-point races run under the original conditions is the New Forest Boxing Day point-to-point, which has a given start and finish point, with riders allowed to choose their own course in-between. This race is run over the open New Forest, with the general area of the finishing point publicised only within the fortnight before the race, and the starting point kept secret until the day of the race itself. It includes races for children and veteran riders. The majority of the races are for riders on purebred New Forest ponies, but some races are open to horses and ponies of other breeds.

== United Kingdom ==
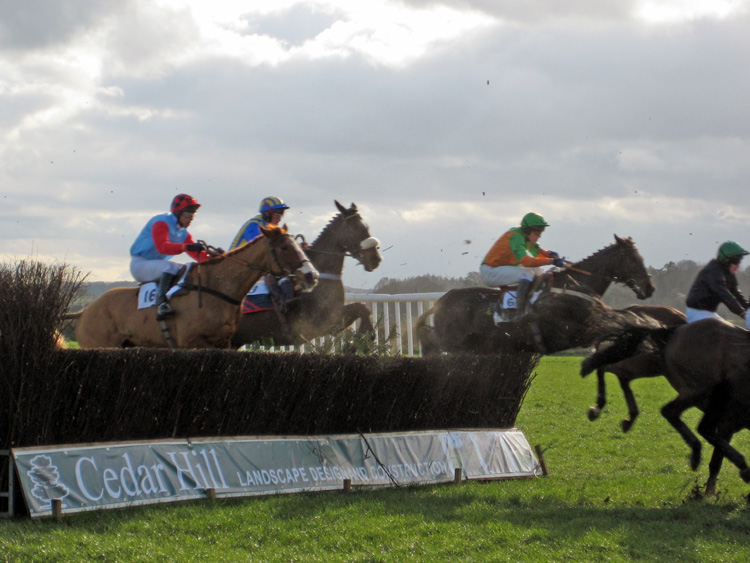
Horses jumping a point-to-point fence

Point-to-point races are normally run over a minimum of three miles, but certain races, including some blue riband events (e.g. the 4-mile Heythrop Men's Open and the 3 1/4-mile Lady Dudley Cup) are longer, and maiden races for young horses (aged four to seven years) can be run over 2 1/2 miles.

Most point-to-point courses are laid out on ordinary farm land, although a few are placed on the inside of professional courses such as Bangor-on-Dee racecourse or Hexham.

A three-mile race is almost invariably two circuits of a typical point to point course although there are one or two exceptions (e.g. Larkhill in Wiltshire). Every course must have a minimum number of 18 fences and at least two fences must have ditches. This however can be reduced if certain fences are unfit or unsafe to be jumped (e.g. due to ground conditions or a fallen horse being in the way). The fences are made of birch and are approximately 4 foot 6 inches high.

=== Active Venues ===
The United Kingdom has approximately 75 active point-to-point courses in recent seasons (with overall annual usage around 70–80 based on Point-to-Point Authority fixtures, results, and reports). This list includes only those with confirmed hosting of at least one fixture in the last 5 years.

- Devon & Cornwall area (12): Bishops Court, Bratton Down, Buckfastleigh Racecourse, Cherrybrook, Dunsmore, Flete Park, Kilworthy, Stafford Cross, Trebudannon, Umberleigh, Upcott Cross, Vaulterhill.
- East Anglia area (5): Ampton, Fakenham, High Easter, Higham, Horseheath.
- Midlands area (4): Brocklesby Park, Dingley, Garthorpe, Guilsborough.
- Northern area (5): Alnwick, Hexham, Overton, Tranwell, Mosshouses.
- South Midlands area (10): Barbury Racecourse, Brafield-on-the-Green, Cocklebarrow, Edgcote, Kimble, Kingston Blount, Lockinge, Mollington, Siddington, Didmarton.
- South East area (5): Godstone, Parham, Penshurst, Peper Harow, Charing.
- Wales area (8): Howick, Llanfrynach, Lydstep, Lower Machen, Ffos Las, Ffynnon Druidion, Trecoed, Pusk.
- Wessex area (9): Badbury Rings, Chipley Park, Cothelstone, Cotley, Holnicote, Larkhill, Milborne St Andrew, South Hill, Ston Easton.
- West Mercian area (10): Bangor-on-Dee, Bitterley, Brampton Bryan, Chaddesley Corbett, Eyton-on-Severn, Knightwick, Maisemore Park, Paxford, Sandon, Shelfield Park.
- Yorkshire area (8): Askham Bryan College, Charm Park, Dalton Park, Hornby Castle, Hutton Rudby, Sherriff Hutton, Witton Castle, Heslaker.

=== Dormant Venues ===
These historical courses show no verifiable fixtures or activity in the last 5 years.

- Devon & Cornwall area: Great Trethew.
- East Anglia area: Northaw.
- Midlands area: Revesby Park, Thorpe Lodge.
- Northern area: Corbridge, Friars Haugh.
- South East area: Aldington.
- Wales area: Bonvilston, Bredwardine, Dunraven Stud, Llwynddu Glais, Monmouthshire Showground, Pyle.
- Wessex area: Charlton Horethorne, Chilfrome.
- West Mercian area: Andoversford, Tabley, Woodford.
- Yorkshire area: Easingwold.

== Ireland ==
In Ireland, point-to-point races are run under the Regulations for Point to Point Steeplechases of the Irish National Hunt Steeplechase Committee (INHSC) of the (Irish) Turf Club. Point-to-point races are distinct from "flapper" races, which are outside the remit of the INHSC. Since the Horse Racing Ireland Act 2016, Horse Racing Ireland (HRI) has responsibility within the Republic of Ireland for licensing meetings and collecting and disbursing fees for point-to-point meetings; the arrangement of each meeting is done largely on a voluntary basis by a local hunt club or other local committee. HRI had before 2016 provided personnel and funding to hunt clubs for prize money and meeting costs. There was opposition to the 2016 act's increased authority as interfering in a system that was already working well.

== See also ==
- Grand National
- List of British National Hunt races
