= Horse Racing Ireland =

Governing body for horse racing on the island of Ireland

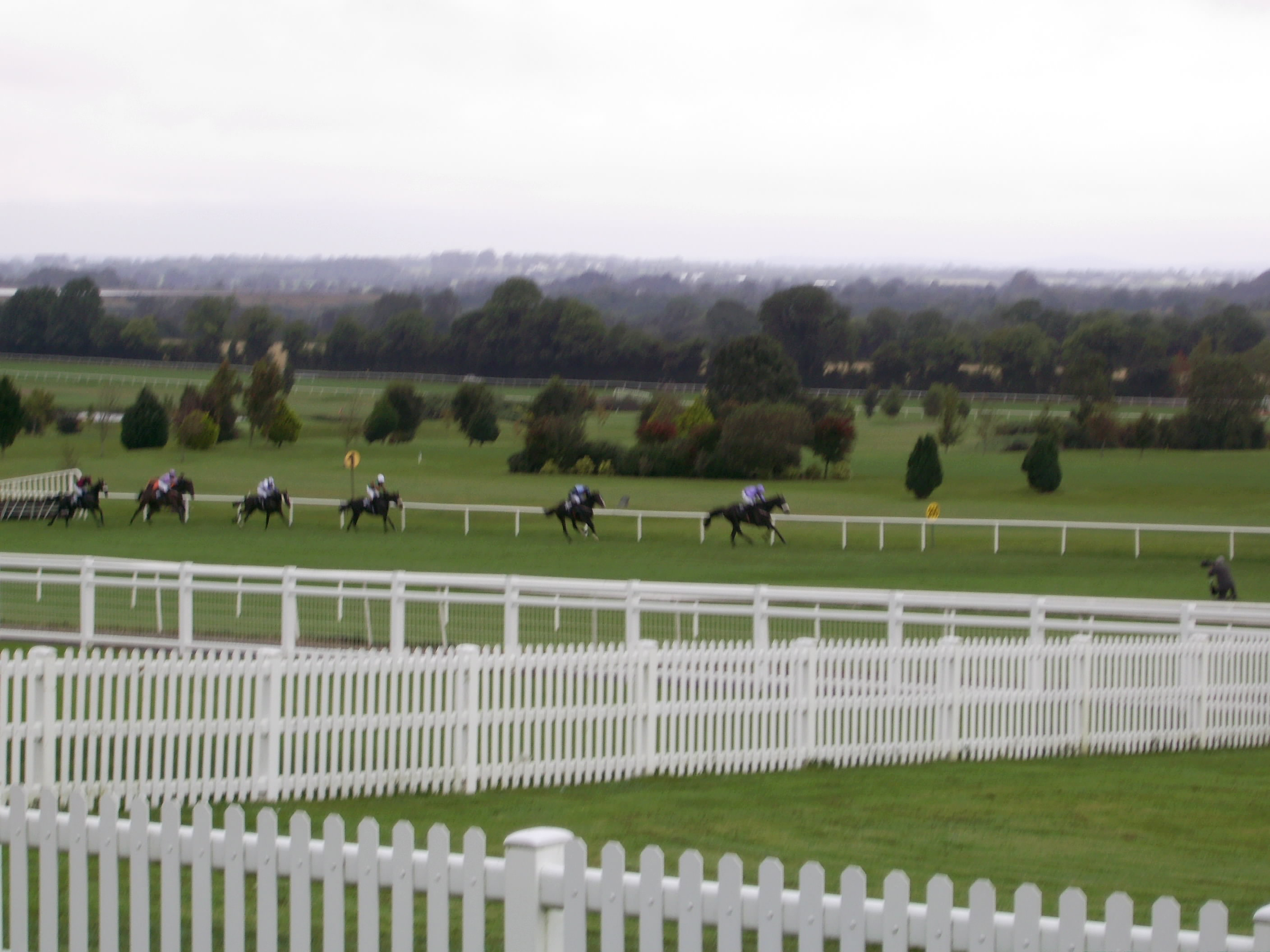
Navan Races in September 2007

Horse Racing Ireland (HRI; Irish: Rásaíocht Capaill na hÉireann) is the governing body of horse racing on the island of Ireland. It is based in the Curragh, County Kildare, next to the racecourse of that name. HRI was founded in 2001, succeeding the Irish Horseracing Authority, itself the 1994 successor to the Racing Board founded in 1945.

HRI's mission statement is "to develop and promote Ireland as a world centre of excellence for horse racing and breeding". Like most other sports, horse racing is run on an All-Ireland basis, so HRI is responsible for racing in both the Republic of Ireland, which has 24 racecourses, and Northern Ireland, which has two racecourses. The remit of the British Horseracing Authority does not extend to Northern Ireland.

In April 2020 the then-CEO of HRI, Brian Kavanagh, said that with the benefit of hindsight the 2020 Cheltenham Festival should not have taken place or should have been held behind closed doors due to the COVID-19 pandemic.

== Business ==
HRI funds the Irish Horseracing Regulatory Board, which enforces the rules of racing, including doping control, handicapping and licensing.

In addition to fulfilling regulatory and promotional functions, HRI owns Fairyhouse, Leopardstown, Navan and Tipperary racecourses. The group's chairperson since May 2018 has been Nicky Hartery and its CEO is Suzanne Eade, who succeeded Brian Kavanagh in September 2021.

The industry contributes significantly to the Irish economy. Figures released by HRI showed that bloodstock sales, Tote betting and racecourse attendances produced significant growth in 2011, marking a positive upturn for the industry which had suffered severe contraction since 2007 across almost all areas. In 2004 this contribution was estimated to be in the region of €330 million.
