= Tramore Racecourse =

Horse racing venue in Ireland

Tramore Racecourse is a horse racing venue in Tramore, County Waterford, Ireland which stages both National Hunt and Flat racing. The course is a Grade Two racecourse and is noted for its right-handed track on a 7 furlong (1400m) circuit.

Racing in Tramore originally took place on the beach in 1785 and was held there until 1911. Racing in the existing location has taken place since 1912. In 1997, a consortium bought the racecourse and invested five million euros in upgrading the facilities.

== Festival ==
Tramore's major race festival has taken place in August since 1807 usually over four days (three evening meetings) from the Thursday to the Sunday with both national hunt and flat races taking place. In all, the racecourse holds eleven meetings per year.
