= Gowran Park Racecourse =

Horse race course in Gowran, Ireland

Coordinates: 52°36′55.74″N 7°04′15.73″W

Gowran Park is a horse race course in County Kilkenny, Ireland. It is located in the Annely Estate near the village of Gowran. The first meeting was held in 1914. and the first ever racecourse commentary in Ireland took place here in 1952.

Gowran Park hosts 16 race days throughout the year with both National Hunt and Flat meetings.

The racing season at Gowran Park has quality fixtures spread evenly throughout the year starting with the Thyestes Handicap Chase in January.

== Notable races ==
| Month | DOW | Race Name | Type | Grade | Distance | Age/Sex |
|---|---|---|---|---|---|---|
| January | Thursday | Galmoy Hurdle | Hurdle | Grade 2 | 3m | 5yo + |
| January | Thursday | Thyestes Chase | Chase | Handicap | 3m 1f | 5yo + |
| February | Saturday | Red Mills Trial Hurdle | Hurdle | Grade 3 | 2m | 4yo + |
| February | Saturday | Red Mills Chase | Chase | Grade 2 | 2m 4f | 5yo + |
| May | Wednesday | Vintage Tipple Stakes | Flat | Listed | 1m 6f | 4yo + f |
| September | Sunday | Denny Cordell Lavarack Fillies Stakes | Flat | Group 3 | 1m 1f 100y | 3yo + f |
| October | Saturday | Gowran Park Champion Chase | Chase | Grade 2 | 2m 4f | 5yo + |
