= ITV Sport =

Sport producer for ITV

- Type: Sports coverage
- Genre: Sport
- Predecessor: Granada Sport; Carlton Sport; LSN (London News Network)
- Founded: 1985
- Founder: ITV Network
- Headquarters: London, England
- Area served: United Kingdom
- Key people: Niall Sloane (ITV Director of Sport); Mark Demuth (Controller of Sport Production)
- Parent: ITV Studios
- Website: itv.com/sport

ITV Sport is the sports department of ITV plc, which produces and presents sports programming for the ITV network and ITVX. The branding was originally introduced in 1985 as an umbrella title for networked sports programming produced by ITV's regional franchises. The division took its current form in 2004 amid the acquisition of Carlton Television by Granada Television to form ITV plc, after which the sports departments of Granada, Carlton, and London News Network were amalgamated to form ITV Sport.

The majority of ITV Sport programmes are broadcast on ITV4 although live football, major horse races and the Rugby World Cup are shown on the ITV network (ITV1, STV and UTV). ITV2 and ITV3 are only used when ITV are showing sport on both ITV1 and ITV4.

== History ==
ITV Sport was created as an umbrella brand for sport programmes on the ITV network; no programmes were actually produced by ITV Sport during this time, but rather the 15 ITV companies each produced sports shows for the umbrella brand, such as World of Sport by LWT and Midweek Sports Special by Thames Television.

In 2004, Granada and Carlton merged, creating a single company for all ITV franchises in England and Wales. The current ITV sport department was formed from the amalgamation of Granada Sport, Carlton's (previously Central's) sports department and LSN, the sport division of London News Network.

=== Former Sport channel ===
Channel's logo

ITV used to have a dedicated sports channel on the ITV Digital network. Originally broadcasting UEFA Champions League football and ATP Masters Series tennis under the brand ONsport, it was renamed as the ITV Sport Channel. Lasting for just one football season, the ITV Sport Channel launched on Saturday 11 August 2001 and closed on Saturday 12 May 2002.

=== Pay-per-view ===
==== ITV Sport Select ====
During the 2001–02 football season ITV showed the on-demand Premier League football matches from Sky Sports on a channel called ITV Sport Select.

==== ITV Box Office ====
ITV launched its pay-per-view channel, ITV Box Office, on 4 February 2017 when it showed coverage of Chris Eubank Jr.'s world title boxing fight against Renold Quinlan. On 24 January 2020 the channel announced its closure via a message posted on the ITV Box Office web page: "The ITV Box Office service has ceased as of 24th January 2020. There are no further plans to show any future events on this channel."

== Current ITV Sport coverage ==
=== Football ===
ITV holds joint rights for the FIFA World Cup with the BBC and has shown every World Cup live since 1966, on a shared basis with the BBC. The same arrangement has been in place for many years for coverage of the UEFA European Championship, which ITV first covered in 1972.

In 2024, ITV acquired the rights for the Carabao Cup semi-finals and final sharing the rights with Sky Sports.

In 2024, ITV Sport commissioned pianist, composer, and singer Hania Rani to create the music featured in the opening credits of their football coverage for England national football team matches.

==== ITV football presenters ====
Since 2015, ITV's main football host is Mark Pougatch. Previous presenters of ITV's football coverage include Jim Rosenthal (1983–88), Elton Welsby (1988–92), Matthew Lorenzo (1993–94), Bob Wilson (1994–99), Des Lynam (1999–2004), Gabby Logan (2004–06), Steve Rider (2006–10) and Adrian Chiles (2010–14).

=== Motorsport ===
The British Touring Car Championship is another series ITV won away from the BBC, doing so in 2002 and in 2004, ITV introduced live coverage of the British Touring Car Championship for the first time on network television. Previously the BBC had shown occasional races live, but not to this extent. All meetings have been broadcast live by ITV Sport since. The races are now shown live on ITV4 and highlights are shown on ITV on Tuesday early morning on the corresponding weekend. Vicki Butler-Henderson and Ben Edwards were the presenters from 2002 to 2005, with Ted Kravitz and Louise Goodman taking over in 2006. Steve Rider replaced Kravitz in 2009.

In 2006, ITV replaced Channel 4 as the terrestrial broadcaster of the British Superbike Championship.

From 2014 to 2016 ITV4 showed highlights of MotoGP which aired on the Monday night after the race, the BT Sport team contributed to the commentary and was in essence a BT Sport production for ITV. These rights were lost to Channel 5 for the 2017 season, then the rights went to Quest for the 2019 season. In 2021, ITV4 regained the rights to MotoGP highlights, and showed the French GP live, with the British GP due to be shown on ITV.

=== Rugby Union ===
The network has broadcast every Rugby World Cup live since 1991, being host broadcaster in 1991, 1999 and 2015. The only tournament that ITV has not shown has been the inaugural tournament held in 1987.

When, in 1996, Sky Sports controversially won the rights to show highlights of England home internationals, including the Five Nations, ITV sub-licensed highlights rights to those games.

At the same time ITV started coverage of the international Rugby Sevens series. This took the form of highlights of most tournaments, with live coverage of those held in England and Wales. ITV lost those rights to Sky Sports in 2006, but between 2015 has been showing highlights once again.

ITV has shown coverage of the Heineken Cup at various points during the tournament's history. ITV showed live coverage of semi-finals and final of the very first and for a single season in 2001, when Premium TV failed to launch its channel on time, which it used to bolster the ITV Sport Channel. ITV resumed its coverage of the tournament in 2022 when it replaced Channel 4 as the event's terrestrial broadcaster.

Between the 2008–09 and 2016–17 seasons ITV Sport showed a weekly highlights programme of all Premiership Rugby and Anglo-Welsh Cup matches. These rights went to Channel 5, who also broadcast five live matches between 2017 and 2021. In 2022, coverage of the Premiership returned with ITV showing seven live matches a season including the final. This continues for the 2023–24 season.

From 2016, in reaction to satellite pay-TV bids from Sky and BT for coverage of the Six Nations Championship from 2017, the BBC agreed to lose exclusive rights to the tournament two years early in order for the BBC and ITV to jointly bid for the rights of the tournament to keep the Six Nations on free-to-air television. On 9 July 2015, the bid was accepted, and ITV and BBC became joint broadcasters of the Six Nations in the UK from 2016 to 2021. ITV would broadcast all England, Ireland and Italy home matches live, while BBC would broadcast all France, Scotland and Wales home matches live. Mark Pougatch and Jill Douglas present ITV's coverage of the Six Nations. Prior to the 2022 tournament, ITV extended their contract up and including 2025. The new deal would see them increase their coverage to 10 live matches, continuing to broadcast home matches from England, Ireland and Italy and additionally broadcasting those from France. The new deal would also mean they would broadcast matches in peak time for the first time. Prior to the 2026 tournament the deal was further extended to the 2029 tournament in a deal which would see ITV continue to broadcast 10 matches including every match featuring England.

On 4 February 2017, it was announced that ITV had extended its contract for the Rugby World Cup until the 2023 tournament. The deal also includes live coverage of the Women's Rugby World Cup for the first time and the Under 20 World Cup. ITV previously showed highlights of the WRWC in 2001.

=== Horse Racing ===
Until the mid-1980s, horse racing was shown regularly on ITV. Racing was a mainstay of World of Sport throughout the programme's run, with the ITV Seven featuring almost every week. ITV also showed racing during the week, including many of racing's showpiece events, such as all the flat racing classics, although the channel never showed The Grand National, as this event was covered by the BBC. In the mid-1980s coverage was switched to Channel 4. In March 1984, ITV's midweek action was moved with Saturday's racing coverage making the switch in October 1985 a week after the final edition of World of Sport was broadcast. ITV continued to broadcast coverage of the Derby, simulcasting Channel 4's coverage, but stopped doing so after the 1988 event.

On 1 January 2016, it was announced that ITV Sport had won rights to be the exclusive free-to-air broadcaster of British Horse Racing from 1 January 2017, taking over from Channel 4. The ITV deal encompassed Horse Racing every Saturday afternoon on ITV1 or ITV4, as well as covering the major festivals on ITV1. This deal meant ITV Sport was able to cover festivals such as The Grand National, Cheltenham and Royal Ascot and also meant the Derby returned to the channel in 2017 for the first time since 1988.

ITV Sports coverage of horse racing encompasses approximately 100 days of racing each year, with 41 days on ITV1 and 60 days on ITV4. The main presenter is Ed Chamberlin, with Francesca Cumani hosting during the Flat season. Oli Bell joined ITV Sport as a presenter of The Opening Show, which is broadcast every Saturday morning on ITV4. Bell also covers main presenter duties for Chamberlain when he is off.

=== Darts ===
ITV was the first broadcaster of darts in the United Kingdom back in 1972. They covered many tournaments on World of Sport, including the News of the World Championship and the Winmau World Masters. When World of Sport ended ITV scaled back its darts coverage and dropped darts altogether in 1988 and with the exception of a single one-off event, the 1999 Match of the Century between PDC World Champion Phil Taylor and BDO World Champion Raymond van Barneveld. It would be almost 20 years before ITV resumed coverage of the sport when in 2007, ITV Sport announced they would be covering a new darts tournament, the Grand Slam of Darts, comprising champions of both the BDO and PDC tournaments. ITV covered the event between 2007 and 2010 – coverage then moved to Sky Sports.

In 2011 ITV signed a new contract with the PDC to show the European Darts Championship in July and the Second Players Championship Finals of 2011.

On 14 June 2013 the PDC and ITV announced they had signed a new deal to cover four tournaments a year from 2013 to 2015. The tournaments are The Players Championship which they had covered from 2009 to 2010 and from December 2011 – present, The European Championship which they covered previously in 2008 and 2011, a new tournament called the Masters where the top 16 face in other in a three-day tournament, and the UK Open, otherwise known as the FA Cup of Darts, which had previously been shown on Sky.

In late 2014 it was announced ITV signed a deal to cover five darts tournaments in 2015 covering a new tournament entitled the World Series of Darts Finals. This means that in 2015 ITV will cover the Masters in January, the UK Open in March, the European Championship in October, the World Series of Darts Finals and Players Championship Finals in November.

=== Snooker ===
In the 1980s and early 1990s, ITV broadcast up to four Major Snooker Tournaments per season including The Jameson International, The World Doubles Championship, The World Matchplay (which replaced the World Doubles in 1988), The Lada/Mercantile Credit Classic and The British Open. Daytime action was sometimes shown on Channel 4 until 1988. However, ITV decided to axe all of its snooker after the 1993 British Open and apart from a brief return to the green baize in 2000 and 2001, the sport was absent from ITV screens for more than 20 years.

ITV started to broadcast snooker again in February 2013. ITV4 broadcast the World Open. It was announced in June 2013 that ITV4 will cover the new tournament entitled the Champion of Champions from November 2013. In summer 2014 ITV and Barry Hearn announced they had signed a 5-year deal to cover 2 Snooker Tournaments per year, keeping coverage of the Champion of Champions and a new tournament called the World Grand Prix. In August 2015, World Snooker announced that ITV4 would televise the Snooker Shoot Out in a three-year deal through to 2018. As of 2021 ITV4 shows the Champion of Champions, World Grand Prix, Players Championship, Tour Championship and the new British Open. This coverage will end by the end of 2025 and will signal ITV's second withdrawal from snooker, although its production arm will produce coverage for Channel 5.

== List of current ITV Sport rights ==
=== Football ===
Football

- FIFA World Cup: All matches live on BBC Sport & ITV Sport (2018–2022)
- UEFA European Championship Finals: All matches live on BBC Sport & ITV Sport (Until 2028)
- EFL Championship, League One, League Two, EFL Cup & EFL Trophy Highlights (2022–present: EFL League highlights on ITV4 and repeated on ITV1)
- FA Youth Cup: Semi-finals and final are shown live on ITV4
- England National Women's Team: 2021–present
- Arnold Clark Cup: 2022–present
- La Liga - 10 live matches per season

Rugby Union

- Men's Rugby World Cup: All matches Live on ITV1, ITV3 & ITV4 (to 2023)
- World Rugby U20 Championship: Live on ITV4 until 2023
- Six Nations Championship: ITV has covered all England, Ireland and Italy home games (2016–2025) plus those from France (2022–2025), since 2026 ITV will retain 9 matches from Italy, Ireland and France and additionally broadcast an England away game played in Scotland (2026 & 2028) or Wales (2027 & 2029).
- Premiership Rugby: 5 live matches in 2021–22 to include the final plus a weekly highlights show. Coverage increasing to seven live matches in 2022–23 and 2023–24.
- European Rugby Champions Cup - 8 live matches per season including final & highlights (to 2023/24)

Motorsport

- British Touring Car Championship: Live on ITV1, ITV2, ITV3 and ITV4 (to 2026)
- MotoGP: British Grand Prix and 1 other race Live on ITV1, ITV3 & ITV4 with highlights of all races on ITV4
- World Superbike Championship: Highlights on ITV4
- British Superbike Championship: Highlights on ITV4
- Isle of Man TT: Highlights on ITV4
- Goodwood Festival of Speed, Goodwood Revival and Goodwood Members Meeting: Live on ITV1, ITV3 and ITV4
- British F3 Championship highlights
- World Rally Championship: Highlights on ITV4
- Extreme E: Live on ITV1
- Formula E: Live on ITVX (all races) and ITV4 (select races; including Monaco and London) until 2027

Boxing

- Premier Boxing Champions: Live on ITV4

Snooker

- World Mixed Doubles: Live on ITV1 and ITV4
- British Open: Live on ITV1, ITV3 and ITV4
- Champion of Champions: Live on ITV3 and ITV4
- World Grand Prix: Live on ITV3 and ITV4
- Players Championship: Live on ITV3 and ITV4
- Tour Championship: Live on ITV3 and ITV4

Darts

- UK Open: Live on ITV3 and ITV4
- European Championship: Live on ITV3 and ITV4
- PDC World Masters: Live on ITV3 and ITV4
- World Series of Darts Finals: Live on ITV3 and ITV4
- Players Championship Finals: Live on ITV3 and ITV4
- World Series of Darts: Delayed and live coverage of 6 events on ITV3 and ITV4

Cycling

- Tour of Britain: Live coverage & Highlights on ITV4
- Women's Tour of Britain: Highlights on ITV4
- British Road Race Championships: Highlights on ITV4

Horse Racing

- Exclusive terrestrial rights to a minimum of 95 days of racing, live on ITV1, ITV3 and ITV4 including Cheltenham Festival, Grand National, Derby & Royal Ascot

American Football

- Two London Games and the Super Bowl live plus weekly highlights until 2024/25

Wrestling

- All Elite Wrestling (2019–present, AEW Dynamite & Rampage reruns on ITV4 and highlights on ITV1)

==== Ice Hockey ====
- National Hockey League: Weekly live games on ITV4 & ITVX

== List of current ITV Sport personnel ==
Football

Presenters:

- Mark Pougatch
- Seema Jaswal (Also works for BBC Sport and Premier League Productions)
- Laura Woods (also works for Amazon Prime Video & TNT Sports)

Pundits:

- Eni Aluko (Also works for Amazon Prime Video)
- Ashley Cole
- Lee Dixon (Also works for Amazon Prime Video and NBC Sports)
- Roy Keane (Also works for Sky Sports)
- Ally McCoist (Also works for Amazon Prime Video, Viaplay Sports, TNT Sports, Sky Sports and Talksport)
- Ian Wright (Also works for BBC Sport)
- Karen Carney (Also works for Sky Sports and Amazon Prime Video)
- Emma Hayes

Commentators:

- Sam Matterface (Also works for Talksport and Premier League Productions)
- Seb Hutchinson (Also works for BBC Radio 5 Live, Sky Sports and Premier League Productions)
- Joe Speight (Also works for TNT Sports, Premier League Productions and NBC Sports)
- Tom Gayle (Also works for BBC Sport and Premier League Productions)

Reporters:

- Gabriel Clarke (Also works for Amazon Prime Video)
- Katie Shanahan (Also works for Sky Sports)

Cycling

Presenter:

- Gary Imlach

Pundits:

- Chris Boardman (Also works for BBC Sport)
- Peter Kennaugh

Commentators:

- Ned Boulting
- David Millar

Darts

Presenters:

- Gabbie Partington
- Pete Graves

Pundits:

- Glen Durrant
- Chris Mason (Also works for Online Live League Darts & Talksport)
- Alan Warriner-Little
- Mark Webster (Also works for Sky Sports)

Commentators:

- Dan Dawson
- Mark Wilson
- Ian Danter

Horse Racing

Presenters:

- Ed Chamberlin
- Francesca Cumani
- Oli Bell

Pundits:

- Jason Weaver
- Mick Fitzgerald
- Jane Mangan
- Leona Mayor
- AP McCoy
- Ruby Walsh
- Megan Nicholls
- Johnny Murtagh
- Brough Scott
- Andrew Thornton
- Hayley Turner

Commentators:

- Richard Hoiles
- Mark Johnson
- Ian Bartlett

Reporters:

- Matt Chapman (Also works for Sky Sports Racing)
- Mick Fitzgerald
- Brian Gleeson
- Sally-Ann Grassick
- Luke Harvey
- Rishi Persad
- Alice Plunkett
- Adele Mullrennan
- Natalie Green
- Charlotte Hawkins
- Mark Heyes
- Chris Hughes
- Lucy Verasamy

Motorsport

- David Addison
- Louise Goodman
- Tim Harvey
- Barry Nutley (Also works for Eurosport)
- Niall Mackenzie (Also works for Eurosport)
- Steve Rider
- Paul O'Neill
- Richard John-Neil
- Phil Glew
- Jade Edwards

Rugby Union

Presenters:

- Martin Bayfield (also works for TNT Sports)
- Craig Doyle (also works for TNT Sports)
- Jill Douglas (also works for BBC Sport)
- Mark Pougatch
- David Flatman (also a commentator and also working for Amazon Prime & TNT Sports)
- Topsy Ojo (also works for TNT Sports)
- Hugh Woozencroft (also works for Talksport)

Pundits:

- Maggie Alphonsi (also works for BBC Sport & Sky Sports)
- Marco Bortolami
- Lawrence Dallaglio (also works for TNT Sports)
- Gordon D'Arcy (also works for RTE Sport & BBC Radio 5 Live)
- Sean Fitzpatrick (also works for Sky Sports)
- George Gregan
- Bryan Habana
- Jim Hamilton (also works for BBC Sport)
- Scott Hastings (also works for Sky Sports)
- Ben Kay (also works for TNT Sports)
- Michael Lynagh (also works for Sky Sports)
- Sir Ian McGeechan
- Brian O'Driscoll (also works for TNT Sports)
- Mike Phillips
- Jamie Roberts (also works for Amazon & S4C)
- Jason Robinson
- Gareth Thomas
- Sam Warburton (also works for BBC Sport & Amazon Prime)
- Danielle Waterman
- Shane Williams (also works for BBC Radio 5 Live)
- Jonny Wilkinson
- Sir Clive Woodward

Commentators:

- Nick Mullins (also works for TNT Sports)
- Miles Harrison (also works for Amazon Prime)
- Martin Gillingham
- Simon Ward

Reporters:

- Gabriel Clarke
- Jill Douglas
- David Flatman

Snooker

Presenters:

- Jill Douglas
- Rishi Persad (also works for BBC Sport)
- Oli Bell

Pundits:

- Neal Foulds (also works for Eurosport/Quest)
- Alan McManus (also works for Eurosport)
- Stephen Hendry (also works for BBC Sport)
- Ken Doherty (also works for BBC Sport)
- Joe Perry (also works for BBC Sport)

Commentators:

- David Hendon (also works for Eurosport/Quest)
- Phil Yates (also works for Eurosport/Quest)

Reporters:

- Rob Walker (also works for BBC Sport)
- Laura Winter

== Previous ITV Sport coverage ==
=== Athletics ===
In 1985, ITV won the rights to show British Athletics from the BBC. As well as broadcasting UK athletics, the channel also showed many of the major European evening meetings whereby ITV showed the first hour with the second hour broadcast on Channel 4. ITV also broadcast the 1983 and 1987 World Championships and the European Athletics Championships during the 1980s and in 1990. Again, some of the coverage was broadcast on Channel 4. Jim Rosenthal presented the coverage with commentary from Alan Parry, Peter Matthews and Steve Ovett. ITV scaled back its coverage of the sport in the early 1990s and decided to axe all remaining athletics coverage in 1997 and the sport has subsequently never been seen on the channel. Channel 4 briefly took the baton from ITV, showing UK meetings in 1997 and 1998, before coverage reverted to the BBC in 1999.

=== The Boat Race ===
In 2004, ITV won the rights to the annual Varsity Boat Race from the BBC. The contract ran to 2009. Hosts of the coverage were initially Gabby Logan and Mark Durden Smith. Craig Doyle took over as presenter, while Peter Drury commentated. James Cracknell acted as a co presenter and pundit. ITV Sport did not renew its contract for The Boat Race after its contract ended due to wanting to concentrate on football and the rights reverted to the BBC.

=== Boxing ===
ITV Sport has broadcast many boxing matches over the years under the Big Fight Live banner and the sport was a regular fixture on ITV screens until the mid-1990s when ITV lost its two premier contracts – in mid-1994 Barry Hearn took Chris Eubank and his stable of fighters to Sky Sports and at the start of 1995, Sky Sports won the rights to show Sports Network fights. This left ITV with only occasional boxing for the following ten years. Their only networked boxing during this period were a few fights involving Shea Neary, thanks to a contract with Merseyside promoter John Hyland. Other bouts were shown on ITV2 and the ill-fated ITV Sport Channel and some boxing was shown on a regional basis, but this was rare.

In May 2005, ITV returned to the ring with live coverage of Amir Khan's last fight before becoming professional against Mario Kindelan. It achieved a peak audience of 6.3 million viewers, encouraging ITV to reach a long-term agreement to broadcast the main share of Frank Warren's Sports Network fights and as a result broadcast fights involving Amir Khan, Joe Calzaghe, Danny Williams, Audley Harrison, Derek Chisora and others. Other highlights included Joe Calzaghe's emphatic victory over Jeff Lacy for the WBO and IBF super-middleweight world title at the Manchester MEN Arena in March 2006. During this period the main event was usually shown on the ITV Network while undercard matches were often televised on ITV4.

On 6 September 2008, Amir Khan switched to Sky from ITV, signalling the end of ITV's contract with Frank Warren's Sports Network promotion. Later that month, ITV announced a 2-year, 26-fight deal with Hennessy Sports. The majority of fights were screened on ITV4 and was once again hosted by Jim Rosenthal, who made an unexpected return to ITV having previously been axed in early 2008. Amir Khan moved back to ITV in 2010, when his fight against Paulie Malignaggi was broadcast live in the early hours of Sunday 15 May 2010. ITV also broadcast delayed coverage of at least one Carl Froch fight in America the night after it took place. ITV then decided to stop covering the sport as ITV thought that boxing was no longer commercially viable.

ITV made a return to boxing in 2015, covering Belfast world champion Carl Frampton live. In 2017 ITV showed Chris Eubank Jr.'s world title boxing fight against Renold Quinlan. The event launched ITV's new pay-per-view channel ITV Box Office. In 2017/18, ITV broadcast the inaugural World Boxing Super Series tournament. ITV didn't renew the contract for the 2018–19 event and the rights moved to Sky Sports.

The main host of ITV Boxing was Jim Rosenthal and until 1996 the main commentators were Reg Gutteridge and Jim Watt, both of whom moved to Sky while continuing to commentate for the few boxing shows ITV televised in the late 1990s, which were presented by Russ Williams. Graham Beecroft commentated on boxing on a regional basis during the late 1990s. When boxing returned to ITV on a regular basis in 2005 Jim Rosenthal resumed presenting duties and Barry McGuigan left Sky Sports to continue his role as a pundit on ITV. John Rawling and Duke McKenzie were the commentators and Gabriel Clarke provided reports and conducted interviews with the boxers.

=== Commonwealth Games ===
The only ITV coverage of the Commonwealth Games has been of the 1958 Games in Cardiff, which was shared with the BBC. Otherwise this event has been shown exclusively on the BBC.

=== Cricket ===
Cricket has only been shown very occasionally on ITV with the Gillette Cup between 1963–1969 and England home test matches with alternative rotation of coverage with the BBC between 1966 and 1968. The BBC had been the major broadcaster of cricket during the 20th century until it lost all of its cricket coverage to Channel 4 in 1999. However, during the BBC's dominance of coverage of the sport ITV occasionally broadcast cricket on a regional basis, such as the Roses matches between Yorkshire and Lancashire which were shown in the north of England. ITV also showed highlights of England's overseas tour of New Zealand in 1988.

There was to be no further cricket on ITV until in 2010 the broadcaster signed a deal to show the 2010 Indian Premier League and encouraged by the success of having aired the Indian Premier League (IPL) in 2010, on a one-year contract, UK broadcaster ITV has signed a new four-year deal with Sony Entertainment for the UK broadcast rights to the IPL. In February 2014 ITV lost coverage of the IPL from the 2015 season to Sky Sports.

ITV also broadcast highlights of the 2010/11 Ashes series and the 2015 Cricket World Cup.

=== Football ===
Previously, ITV held the rights to English top flight football highlights (both in its current iteration as the Premier League and as the old Football League First Division). It acquired the Premiership highlights in 2000 for the 2001–02, 2002–03 and 2003–04 seasons, surprising the BBC, the previous holders, and ending Match of the Day as a weekly programme. The ITV programme was titled The Premiership and was presented by Des Lynam (himself formerly a presenter for Match of the Day), Matt Smith or Gabby Logan. The show originally went out at 7pm, but this ended up being unpopular with viewers and advertisers. As such, the show was moved to 10.30pm only a few months later. During this period, The Goal Rush was aired on Saturday during the football matches taking place on that day to provide live scores and match reports. It used a similar format to Gillette Soccer Saturday on Sky Sports but never achieved good ratings. The programme ended in 2003. ITV held the Premiership rights for one three-year contract – the rights returned to the BBC for the start of the 2004–05 season.

ITV had a long-standing association with European club football, which dates back to the earliest days of ITV in the 1950s. broadcasting the UEFA Champions League every year from 1992 through to 2015, exclusively from 1992 to 2003, before shared it with Sky Sports since 2003. From 1997, ITV began the habit of broadcasting additional matches from the competition, at first showing one extra match per week on either the Granada Plus or Carlton Select cable channels before, following the launch of On Digital, it showed every key match through special bespoke channels Champions on 28 and Champions on 99, later ONsport 1 and ONsport 2, as well as on ITV2. When ITV4 launched, one match would be aired on ITV1 with another on ITV4. This practice continued until 2009, when ITV reduced its output to just one live match per set in the competition on ITV1. This was due to ITV gaining rights for the UEFA Europa League where 2 back to back games would be broadcast free to air on ITV4 with the final on ITV1. Live coverage ended in 2015 when BT Sport took over as exclusive broadcaster of the UEFA Champions League and UEFA Europa League, although ITV's involvement with the competition remained through showing highlights of both competitions every matchweek. However ITV lost these rights in 2017 meaning that their coverage of the UEFA Champions League, UEFA Europa League and UEFA Super Cup ceased after the 2017/18 season as BT Sport won exclusive rights for live matches, highlights and online clip rights.

From 2008 until 2022 ITV covered all of England's international home friendlies and qualifiers for the European Championship and World Cup, the deal was extended to include away friendlies in 2009 and qualifiers from 2010 until it lost the rights to Channel 4 in 2022. Latterly, the deal also included highlights of the new UEFA Nations League tournament were also obtained. ITV also cover one other European qualifier per round not involving a home nation on ITV4 as well, as showing highlights of the rest of the games including those of Wales, Scotland, Northern Ireland and the Republic of Ireland. ITV occasionally broadcasts England football matches on ITV2 as well as ITV1 when England and another home nation plays at the same time. ITVs local stations such as STV, would broadcast the home nation in that area with English viewing on ITV4. If people in Scotland want to watch an England match would need to switch to ITV2.

ITV also showed coverage of the African Cup of Nations on ITV4 from 2010 to 2015 with both live coverage and highlights, these rights were lost after 2015 to British Eurosport who show the tournament exclusively. ITV also showed highlights of the UEFA Champions League & Europa League from 2015 to 2018 after they lost their live rights but it was transferred to BT Sport after the 2018 final.

In February 2019, ITV acquired the rights to show LaLiga Santander, the top flight of Spanish football alongside Eleven Sports and Premier Sports. The deal means ITV will show 1 weekly live fixture, and a mid-week highlights program until the end of the 2018/19 season. From the start of the 2019–20 La Liga season, Premier Sports became the exclusive UK broadcaster.

==== FA Cup ====
ITV shared the rights for the FA Cup with the BBC from 1955 to 1988 and again since 2021 with both broadcasters covering the final live. This was generally the only UK match shown live on television every season. Both broadcasters started coverage from early morning trying to gain the upper hand on their rival.

ITV regained the live rights to broadcast the FA Cup exclusively on terrestrial television in 1997, showing each final with Sky from 1998 to 2001 while the BBC screened highlights on Match of the Day. The FA Cup then reverted to the BBC until 2008 when ITV regained the FA Cup and England rights. However, their coverage of the competition was criticised after a string of errors including poor camera angles, very short highlight shows and, most notably, the incident during the Fourth Round derby between Everton and Liverpool in the 2008–09 competition. After a goalless 90 minutes, the game went to extra-time. And when young midfielder Dan Gosling scored the winner in the second half of extra-time, ITV accidentally cut to adverts, causing viewers to miss the goal. Eventually, ITV lost these rights from the end of the 2013–14 season to BBC Sport.

On 23 May 2019, ITV regained the rights from BT Sport from 2021 to 2022 making the FA Cup fully available on free-to-air television for the first time since 1988. However this ended at the end of the 2025 competition with ITV's share of the competition moving to TNT Sports.

=== Formula 1 ===
ITV covered Formula One during the 1976 and 1977 seasons and from 1997 to 2008, after the BBC lost the rights. The deal, worth £60 million, offered extended pre and post race analysis and complete live coverage of qualifying, thanks to a deal negotiated with FOM's Bernie Ecclestone. ITV chose to bid for the rights due to constantly being beaten at weekends while the Grand Prix coverage was on.

ITV drew criticism for airing advertisement breaks during the races – they were obliged to take five three-minute commercial breaks during each race. In 2005 the network angered fans by running adverts during the tense conclusion to the San Marino Grand Prix. ITV repeated the last three laps after the race but were inundated with complaints from angry viewers. As a result of these complaints, the server on their website crashed and they were fined by regulator Ofcom. An on-air apology was made before the start of the next race in Spain two weeks later.

In March 2008, ITV announced that they had enacted a clause within their contract enabling them to leave F1 coverage after the 2008 season. It is believed this was done for commercial reasons and to allow more money to be spent on securing coverage of the UEFA Champions League. The BBC took over the contract, providing coverage from 2009 until 2015.

In December 2015, ITV was rumoured to be making a potential return to Formula One from the 2016 season. However, the contract instead went to Channel 4 F1, who would cover half of the races live like the BBC did from 2012 to 2015.

=== Golf ===
In the mid-1970s, ITV held the rights to golf's Ryder Cup and broadcast the event on three occasions - 1973, 1975, and 1977 cups. ITV had the 1979 rights but the 1979 cup was not televised in the UK due to the 1979 ITV strike. The rights to the event reverted to the BBC in 1981.

ITV also broadcast the 1972 and 1973 Scottish Open.

Golf coverage switched from ITV to Channel 4 when it launched in 1982 before disappearing from ITV Sport altogether by the mid-1980s.

=== Motorsport ===
For the 2014–2015 and 2015–2016 seasons ITV and ITV4 showed live coverage of Formula E, the races were presented by Jennie Gow from London and commentary was provided by the world feed of Jack Nicholls and Dario Franchitti. Again, these rights were lost to Channel 5 for the 2016–2017 season, then for the 2018–19 season the rights went to the BBC, Quest, and BT Sport.

ITV4 also showed coverage of the World Rally Championship in the mid-2000s under their speed Sunday banner and again from 2012 to 2015 again losing the rights to Channel 5.

=== Olympic Games ===
ITV covered the summer Olympic Games 1968, 1972, 1980 and 1988. Costs associated with staff working overseas prevented coverage of the 1984 Los Angeles Olympics but the Games returned to ITV screens for one last time in 1988, sharing the coverage with Channel 4 – Channel 4 showing the overnight and breakfast coverage with ITV covering the daytime action as well as broadcasting early evening highlights programmes.

ITV has never fully broadcast the Winter Olympics.

=== Power Snooker ===
In 2010 and 2011 ITV introduced a new cue sport called Power Snooker. These were the only two occasions on which the sport was played. Power Snooker was a hybrid between snooker and pool.

=== Rugby Union ===
On the back of its successful broadcasting of the 1991 World Cup, ITV showed a variety of rugby, including the 1993 British Lions tour to New Zealand, Autumn Internationals and even some club rugby, though this was restricted to certain regions. This ended in 1996 when Sky Sports increased its rugby union coverage, which included Sky taking over as broadcaster of the British and Irish Lions.

=== Tennis ===
In 2011, ITV Sport won the rights from the BBC to show the French Open and started televising the event in 2012. The bulk of the daily coverage was broadcast on ITV4 although both singles finals plus other weekend matches were shown on ITV. In 2018, ITV renewed its deal to show the tournament for another 3 years. From 2022, Eurosport won exclusive rights to the French Open, ending a 10-year spell of the French Open being on ITV. For the final year ITV broadcast the French Open, John Inverdale hosted the coverage with commentators including Nick Mullins and Jonathan Overend. Analysts and Co-commentators included Marion Bartoli, Jim Courier, Anne Keothavong, Mark Petchey, Fabrice Santoro and Sam Smith.

=== Tour de France ===
ITV obtained the rights to cycling's Tour de France in 2002, replacing Channel 4 as the UK terrestrial broadcaster. The intention behind the purchase was to provide live content for the ITV Sport Channel during the football off-season. The coverage was shown on ITV4, having aired in previous years on ITV2 and ITV3. Initially, live coverage was only broadcast at the weekend but since the 2010 Tour de France, ITV4 had broadcast daily live coverage of every stage except the final which is shown on ITV. ITV4 also aired nightly highlights shows.

ITV's coverage of the Tour de France ended after the 2025 event with the rights moving to TNT Sports.

=== Wimbledon ===
During the 1960s ITV covered the Wimbledon tennis tournament alongside the BBC.

=== Wrestling ===
Wrestling was shown as part of ITV's flagship sports programme World of Sport until the programme was cancelled in 1985. Its many stars included Big Daddy and Giant Haystacks, and it received viewing figures of 8 million every week.

After that, wrestling was shown as a programme in its own right, moving to a lunchtime slot. This continued until ITV decided to end its coverage of wrestling at the end of 1988. World of Sport Wrestling returned on New Year's Day 2017 with a new generation of British Wrestlers and commentary from legendary WWE commentator Jim 'JR' Ross and former British Wrestler Alex Shane.
