= Timeline of horse racing on UK television =

This is a timeline of the history of horse racing on television in the United Kingdom.

== 1950s ==
- 1951
  - The BBC broadcasts horse racing for the first time when it televises races from Ascot.
  - The 1000 and 2000 Guineas is also televised by the BBC until 1960.
- 1952
  - No events.
- 1953
  - The Scottish Grand National is shown on television for the first time. It was also shown the following year, but then was not screened again until 1969.
- 1954
  - No evenets.
- 1955
  - ITV launches, and shows horse racing from its earliest days on air.
- 1956
  - The BBC shows Glorious Goodwood for the first time.
- 1957
  - No events.
- 1958
  - 10 October – The first edition of multi-sport Saturday afternoon television show Grandstand is broadcast and throughout the programme's history, horse racing is a regular feature of the programme.
- 1959
  - March – The Lincoln Handicap is first televised by the BBC. The BBC would continue to cover the race until the closure of Lincoln Racecourse in 1964, after which coverage of the race moves to ITV.

== 1960s ==
- 1960
  - 26 March – The Grand National is televised for the first time, by the BBC Television Service. However, despite the Grand National's protected status in which it could not be exclusive to a single channel, ITV opted not to show the race on a joint basis with the BBC.
  - 1 June – ITV and the BBC both show the Epsom Derby because it was a protected event which could not be exclusive to either channel. However, the rest of the Epsom events, including The Oaks, are broadcast exclusively on ITV.
  - 10 September - ITV shows the St Leger for the first time ITV has 2 of the 5 classics Oaks and St Leger exclusively.
- 1961
  - 1961 - ITV televises the 1000 and 2000 Guineas until 1965, meaning that ITV would have 4 of the 5 classics exclusively until the BBC regains the rights for a 2-year period from 1966 to 1968 whereby ITV would revert to two exclusive classics - the Oaks and St Leger - plus The Derby, shared with the BBC until 1968.
- 1962
  - No events.
- 1963
  - No events.
- 1964
  - No events.
- 1965
  - 2 January - World Of Sport begins with horse racing being one of the programme's three mainstays, and generally shown in an early-afternoon two-hour block.
- 1966
  - 30 July – The Saturday of this year's Glorious Goodwood meeting is not televised due to the BBC focusing on the 1966 World Cup Final. There is also no racing on ITV's World Of Sport for the same reason.
- 1967
  - No events.
- 1968
  - ITV covers the late summer meeting at Goodwood, and does so for the next three years. This is the only time that ITV covered racing from this course in the 20th century as all other coverage was shown on the BBC until 2006
- 1969
  - The Scottish Grand National returns to television screens, with coverage on ITV.
  - Newmarket returns to ITV after a 3-year absence with the return to ITV of the 1000 Guineas and 2000 Guineas for the first time since 1965 after 3 years on the BBC meaning that ITV now has exclusive rights to 4 of the 5 British classics, with both BBC and ITV continuing to jointly show The Derby.
  - 4 October – The first ITV Seven takes place, under the title of They’re Off!. The required number of races was obtained by televising races at two courses each week.

== 1970s ==
The only notable events this decade concerns the BBC's coverage of The Derby. though the BBC would televise the Midlands Grand National three times between 1971 and 1977.

- 1971 - The Midlands Grand National is televised for the first time by the BBC.
- 1972 - The Midlands Grand National is televised by the BBC for the second year in a row BBC cameras would not return after the 1972 running until 1977.
- 1975 – ITV becomes the only channel to show the Derby - the race had previously been shown by both ITV and the BBC.
- 1976 - For the second year in a row ITV has exclusive coverage of The Derby like in 1975 the BBC back out due to budget cuts.
- 1977 – The BBC shows the Derby for the first time in three years. The race, and the rest of the Epsom meeting, is shown on ITV. The Midlands Grand National is televised for the last time in the 1970s by the BBC who would not return until 1998 while the race itself would not be televised again until 1991.
- 1978 - ITV for the third time in 4 years covers the Derby exclusively the BBC decline due to other sporting commitments.
- 1979 – The BBC shows the Derby for the final time in the 20th century.

== 1980s ==
- 1980
  - January – Meetings from Kempton Park switch from the BBC to ITV.
  - 4 June – ITV, once again, becomes the exclusive broadcaster of the Derby. Thereby ITV for the first time since 1978 would have exclusive rights to all 5 British classics and this time it would be permanent a major ITV victory against the BBC's dominance of sport on British TV.
- 1981
  - No events.
- 1982
  - No events
- 1983
  - Racing coverage is cut back on ITV. The ITV Seven is no longer a guaranteed slot on World of Sport and two regional ITV stations stop showing midweek racing. Central opts out of midweek coverage from August 1983, and TVS following suit after the last midweek coverage of the 1983 season (the UK vs US jockeys' championship at Sandown).
- 1984
  - 22 March – Horse racing coverage is broadcast on Channel 4 for the first time, to allow midweek horse racing to leave ITV.. This results in the launch of Channel 4 Racing.
- 1985
  - 28 September – The final World Of Sport is transmitted the last racing on World Of Sport is at Redcar.
  - 5 October – The first weekend horse racing is shown on Channel 4 when ITV transfers coverage of horse racing to Channel 4 after the end of World of Sport.
- 1986
  - Channel 4, who until now had shown meetings that ITV would have been contracted to show, announces their own new contracts with Ayr, Doncaster, Epsom, Kempton Park, Newcastle, Newmarket, Sandown and York. Consequently, coverage is focussed on these courses and therefore Channel 4 does not show racing every Saturday. Also, the only winter midweek coverage is the King George VI Chase fixture at Kempton, although the next few years sees some fixtures added, such as Chester's May meeting.
- 1987
  - No events.
- 1988
  - 1 June – ITV ends its live coverage of horse racing for the next three decades when it simulcasts Channel 4's coverage of the Epsom Derby for the final time. ITV does show delayed coverage of the event until the early 1990s before it finally ends its coverage of the sport.
- 1989
  - 7 October – Channel 4 launches a morning preview programme Morning Line. The 25-minute programme aired every Saturday and was shown regardless of whether Channel 4 was televising horse racing later that day.

== 1990s ==
- 1990 to 1993
- 1991
  - 16 March - The Midlands Grand National returns to TV after a 14 year absence as a result of the move to March and the Saturday after Cheltenham with Channel 4 covering the race until 1997
- 1993
  - 1 January - Channel 4 Racing is now made by an independent company Three On 4 Productions on an initial 4-year contract until 1996 later rebranded as Highflyer would go on to successfully cover Channel 4 Racing for 19 years until 2012.
  - April - Sky Sports begins live Summer evening horse racing coverage with The Winning Post.
- 1994
  - 15–17 March – The BBC shows The Cheltenham Festival for the final time.
- 1995
  - March – Channel 4 takes over the rights to meetings held at Cheltenham. This means that Channel 4 takes over as broadcaster of the Cheltenham Festival.
  - The Racing Channel launches and becomes the UK's first television channel devoted to a single sport.
- 1996 to 1999
- 1997
  - 1 January - Highflyer Productions (rebranded from Three on 4) retains production of Channel 4 Racing, Highflyer Productions beat off service provider for Betting Shops, the Sky Sports Winning Post programme and The Racing Channel SIS who were following the Racing Channel's success and the success of the Sky Sports evening programme The Winning Post with an expansion into terrestrial/network television for their Channel 4 bid for the renewal of the Channel 4 Racing production contract following a retender process which ran from late 1995/early 1996 as the original contract under Three on Four was due to expire at the end of 1996. Highflyer would have a successful award-winning run as Channel 4 Racing's producers for another 15 years until losing out to IMG in 2012.
- 1998
  - January - Channel 4 lose Uttoxeter and Newcastle rights to the BBC but the latter was sublicenced to Sky Sports Newcastle returns to Channel 4 in 1999 while Uttoxeter stays with the BBC until 2005.
  - 21 March - The BBC returns to Uttoxeter for the Midlands Grand National after a 21 year absence having last covered the race in 1977 the BBC covers the meeting for another 7 years until 2005

.

== 2000s ==
- 2000
  - 10 June – Channel 4 shows the Epsom Derby for the final time for more than the next decade as the contract for Epsom transfers to the BBC. Channel 4 had shown the event since 1984, and exclusively since 1989. It will return to the channel in 2013 for four more years.
- 2001
  - 9 June – For the first time since 1979, the BBC shows the Epsom Derby.
- 2002
  - Coverage of meetings at Newbury switches from the BBC to Channel 4.
  - 1 May – At The Races launches. Channel Four Television Corporation is one of the partners involved in the venture.
- 2003
  - January – The Racing Channel closes. It had been on air since 1995.
- 2004
  - 29 March – At the Races closes down due to financial problems.
  - 29 May – Racing UK launches.
  - 11 June – At the Races relaunches as a stand-alone venture. without Channel Four.
- 2005
  - No events.
- 2006
  - 8 March – Racing TV launches an international racing channel Racing World with its output focussed on coverage from the United States. Consequently, Racing TV now concentrates on UK horse racing.
  - 18 March - Uttoxeter with the Midlands Grand National returns to Channel 4.
- 2007
  - 28 January – The final edition of Grandstand is broadcast. Racing had been a regular feature of the programme, and alternated with other sports during the first half of the show. However, recent years had seen less racing on the programme as the BBC had started to reduce its coverage of the sport in the 2000s.
  - Glorious Goodwood, alongside all other meetings held at Goodwood, transfer to Channel 4 after 50 years of coverage by the BBC.
- 2008
  - No events.
- 2009
  - 24 August – Racing World closes after just over three years on air.

== 2010s ==
- 2010
  - As a result of reductions in the amount of horse racing shown on the BBC, the Corporation shows just 13 days of racing in 2010.
- 2011
  - October - The BBC covers the first British Champions Day at Ascot in a 2-year deal, a fortnight earlier the BBC covers Arc day on its Red Button service and on BBC2.
- 2012
  - 7 October – For the first time for many years, the Prix de l'Arc de Triomphe is not shown on terrestrial television - coverage is broadcast exclusively by At the Races and Racing UK. The BBC had shown the event for many years and Channel 4 had also shown the race between 1986 and 1994 and in 2001. The event returns to Channel 4 the following year.
  - 27 December – BBC Sport shows horse racing for the final time ahead of Channel 4 taking over as broadcaster of all terrestrial horse racing from the start of 2013. The BBC had scaled back its horse racing in recent years, gradually losing more and more events to Channel 4.
- 2013
  - 1 January – Channel 4 takes over as the exclusive terrestrial TV home of all horse racing in the UK. The BBC had scaled back its horse racing in recent years, gradually losing more and more events to Channel 4. Consequently, races such as The Grand National are shown on Channel 4 for the first time.
- 2014
  - No events.
- 2015
  - No events.
- 2016
  - 14 March – Racing UK begins broadcasting in high-definition.
  - 27 December – Channel 4 Racing comes to an end after more than 32 years ahead of the transfer of all terrestrial television coverage of the sport to ITV.
- 2017
  - 1 January – ITV takes over from Channel 4 as the exclusive terrestrial broadcaster of horse racing. The deal will see ITV broadcast nearly 100 days of racing each year - 60 on ITV4 and minimum of 34 fixtures on the main ITV channel. This is the first time since 1988 that the sport had been shown on ITV.
- 2018
  - 17 December – Racing UK rebrands itself as Racing TV, doing so in anticipation of the first live broadcast of racing on the channel from the Republic of Ireland on 1 January 2019.
- 2019
  - 1 January – Sky Sports Racing launches, replacing At the Races.

== 2020s ==
- 2020
  - Racing is suspended for 11 weeks due to the COVID-19 pandemic. ITV televises the next events, which are held behind closed doors for health reasons; its presenters broadcast from home until they are again allowed to present from racecourses without crowds.
  - ITV renews its terrestrial broadcasting contract for racing from seasons 2021 to 2023, renewing the deal again in 2023 to cover the years 2024–2026.
  - ITV renewed its contract in late 2025 to cover racing from 2027 to 2030 taking its current coverage to 13 years.
