= 2026 Grand National =

Horse race in Aintree, England

- Grand National
- Location: Aintree
- Date: 11 April 2026
- Winning horse: I Am Maximus
- Starting price: 9/2F
- Jockey: Paul Townend
- Trainer: Willie Mullins
- Owner: J. P. McManus
- Conditions: Good to Soft

The 2026 Grand National (officially known as the "Randox 2026 Grand National" for sponsorship reasons) was the 178th annual running of the Grand National horse race. It took place on Saturday 11 April 2026, at Aintree near Liverpool, England. It was won by the 2024 winner I Am Maximus, trained by Willie Mullins and ridden by Paul Townend.

== Finishing order ==
Position	Name	Jockey	Age	Handicap (st-lb)	SP	Distance
01	I Am Maximus	Paul Townend	10	11-12	9/2 Fav	
02	Iroko	Jonjo O'Neill Jr.	8	11-1	18/1	2½L
03	Jordans	Ben Jones	7	10-8	28/1	1¼L
04	Johnnywho	Richie McLernon	9	10-4	12/1	½L
05	High Class Hero	James Bowen	9	10-11	66/1	6½L
06	Favori De Champdou	Danny Gilligan	11	11-1	40/1	1¼L
07	Final Orders	Conor Stone-Walsh	10	10-5	22/1	9L
08	Champ Kiely	Danny Mullins	10	11-1	25/1	1L
09	Three Card Brag	Jordan Gainford	9	11-0	50/1	3L
10	Monty's Star	Darragh O'Keeffe	9	11-3	14/1	5½L
11	Answer To Kayf	John Shinnick	10	10-8	100/1	1¾L
12	Gorgeous Tom	Sean Flanagan	8	10-9	20/1	9½L
13	Imperial Saint	Callum Pritchard	8	10-2	50/1	NK
14	Haiti Couleurs	Sean Bowen	9	11-10	28/1	34L
15	Twig	Beau Morgan	11	10-4	40/1	32L
16	Firefox	Keith Donoghue	8	11-4	40/1	34L

== Non-finishers ==
Fence	Name	Jockey	Age	Handicap (st-lb)	SP	Fate
01	Grangeclare West	Patrick Mullins	10	11-10	9/1	Unseated Rider
02	Quai De Bourbon	Donagh Meyler	7	10-9	33/1	Fell
03	Panic Attack	Harry Skelton	10	10-5	7/1	Fell
06	Mr Vango	Jack Tudor	10	10-12	66/1	Fell
07	Gerri Colombe	Jack Kennedy	10	11-10	33/1	Fell
13	The Real Whacker	Gavin Sheehan	10	10-9	50/1	Pulled Up
15	Banbridge	J J Slevin	10	11-11	33/1	Unseated Rider
15	Oscars Brother	Daniel King	8	10-13	14/1	Unseated Rider
18	Marble Sands	Thomas Bellamy	10	10-5	66/1	Fell
19	Stellar Story	Robert Dunne	9	10-11	33/1	Fell
19	Beauport	Sam Twiston-Davies	10	10-11	80/1	Unseated Rider
19	Jagwar	Mark Walsh	7	10-10	17/2	Unseated Rider
26	Spanish Harlem	Brian Hayes	8	11-3	50/1	Pulled Up
26	Lecky Watson	Sean O'Keeffe	8	11-2	50/1	Pulled Up
27	Captain Cody	Jonathan Burke	8	10-10	22/1	Unseated Rider
27	Perceval Legallois	Harry Cobden	9	10-9	33/1	Unseated Rider
29	Amirite	Phillip Enright	10	10-2	100/1	Pulled Up
30	Top Of The Bill	Toby McCain-Mitchell	10	10-5	50/1	Fell

== Broadcasting and media ==
"As they head down towards the last in the National, it is Jordans who's over, High Class Hero, mistake in second, Johnnywho and I Am Maximus, as they set off up the run-in towards the elbow, Jordans dash for glory, still leads by 4 lengths, Johnnywho hampered by the loose horse, High Class Hero, I Am Maximus continues to stay on. They reached the elbow, and Jordans is getting tired, as I Am Maximus throws down the challenge, for Paul Townend. I Am Maximus, coming to Jordans on the run to the line, it is I Am Maximus in front again in the National, Flashing home late is Iroko, but at the line, I Am Maximus regains the National. The first since Red Rum."

— ITV lead commentator Richard Hoiles describes the climax of the race.

As the Grand National is accorded the status of an event of national interest in the United Kingdom and is listed on the Ofcom Code on Sports and Other Listed and Designated Events, it must be shown on free-to-air terrestrial television in the UK. The race was broadcast live on TV by ITV for the ninth time, and the third year in its new three-year deal with the British Horseracing Authority.

The ITV coverage was presented by Ed Chamberlin. Analysis was provided by former jockeys Sir Anthony McCoy, Mick Fitzgerald, Rachael Blackmore and Ruby Walsh. Reports were provided by Alice Plunkett, who spoke to the winning jockeys, Rishi Pershad, who was in the pre-parade ring, Luke Harvey, who was down at the start and Matt Chapman, who spoke to the owners and trainers in the parade ring and winners enclosure. Betting updates were provided by Brian Gleeson. Oli Bell and Sam Quek covered viewers' comments on social media, and the commentary team was Mark Johnson, Stewart Machin and Richard Hoiles, who called the finish for the ninth time. Following the race, Bell and Walsh guided viewers on a fence-by-fence re-run of the race.

The race was also broadcast by BBC Radio 5 Live, whose team included Gina Bryce, former jockeys Andrew Thornton and Charlie Poste, John Hunt, Darren Owen, Gary O'Brien and Rob Nothman. Bryce became the first woman to commentate live on the race since course owner Mirabel Topham in 1952.
