= John Rickman (broadcaster) =

British broadcaster, journalist, and author

John Eric Carter Rickman
- Born: John Rickman; 28 May 1913; Wimbledon, Surrey, England
- Died: 13 October 1997 (aged 84); Midhurst, West Sussex
- Other name: Robin Goodfellow (racing nom-de-plume)
- Education: Haileybury College
- Occupations: Journalist, television presenter, sports commentator (1955–1978)
- Employer(s): Daily Mail; Daily Sketch; ITV Sport (1955–1978)
- Television: ITV Racing
- Parent: Eric Rickman
- Relatives: Tom Jennings (racehorse trainer), William Carter (racehorse trainer).

John Rickman (28 May 1913 – 13 October 1997) was a British journalist, broadcaster and author. The majority of his career was as a print racing journalist initially for the Bristol Evening News and then later with the Daily Mail and The Daily Sketch. He was a racing tipster, often featuring to the top of the unofficial Sporting Life naps table, a competition held between journalists to select winners. A broadcaster with London Weekend Television's World of Sport for 23 years, he was the first person to introduce the sport of horse racing on an independent television channel in the UK and is considered one of the pioneer television broadcasters of that sport. Rickman penned several books during his career including Homes Of Sport (1952) and Eight Flat Racing Stables (1979).

== Early years ==
John Eric Carter Rickman was born in Wimbledon, the elder son of Eric Rickman, a writer and racing correspondent with The Daily Mail and the Evening Standard. His family lore was steeped in the training and racing of horses. His maternal grandfather William Carter was the son of Elijah Carter, one-time trainer to the King Victor Emmanuel of Italy. His maternal grandmother was the daughter of another successful 19th century racehorse trainer Tom Jennings, the trainer of French bred Gladiateur, winner of the English Triple Crown in 1865. He was educated at Feltonfleet School near the family home in Cobham before attending Haileybury College between 1927 and 1931, when he began an apprenticeship as a journalist with the Bristol Evening World, one of a chain of evening newspapers owned by Northcliffe Newspapers.

== Career ==
Rickman transferred to the Evening News Sports Dept., covering local rugby, cricket, greyhound racing and horse racing at Cheltenham and Bath, later moving to the sister paper the Bristol Echo and Times . Rickman returned to Surrey in 1932 to recover from a lung illness and in 1934 joined the Daily Mail as a junior reporter covering a variety of stories and becoming the newspaper's Zoo correspondent. A reservist with the Gloucestershire Regiment Rickman arrived in France six days after the Normandy landings had occurred and spent the remainder of the War in France and Belgium.

Returning to the Daily Mail on demobilisation in 1946 he accepted the post of Dalrymple, the Daily Mail's second racing correspondent. His father Eric returned to his post of Robin Goodfellow, the nom-de- plume for the chief racing correspondent and on his father's retirement in 1949 he succeeded his father in the post. The role of chief tipster Robin Goodfellow was offered to Arthur Salter in 1959 a decision that was not to Rickman's liking and he moved to the Daily Sketch in 1961 as Gimcrack to pursue a similar role. His autobiography describes his delight when he selected an outsider Ayala to win the 1963 Grand National. The demise of the Daily Sketch, officially it was merged with the new tabloid Daily Mail in 1971, resulted in Rickman returning to his former employers where he remained until the late 1970s.

In the early 1950s BBC racing was attracting large audiences with racing journalists that included Clive Graham and Peter O'Sullevan, both of the rival Daily Express, fronting the burgeoning coverage. When Graham was unavailable Rickman began to cover his role as a paddock correspondent gaining some experience that proved very helpful when Independent Television launched in 1955. Rickman became the first frontman for the new channel's racing coverage that began in 1956 maintaining the role until his retirement in 1978 when John Oaksey replaced him. In front of the camera Rickman offered a reassuring courteous presence invariably greeting the audience with a doffing of his trilby hat.

Rickman married Margaret (Peggy) Law in 1939 moving to Fernhurst, West Sussex in the Lod valley after the War. He died on 13 October 1997.

== Autobiography ==
- Rickman, John (1990), Old Tom and Young Tom, Allborough Press, Cambridge, England

== Bibliography ==
- Rickman, John (1952), Horse Racing (Homes of Sport), Peter Garnett, UK
- Rickman, John (1979), Eight Flat-Racing Stables, Heinemann 978-0434637102
- Rickman, John (1998), The Land of Lod, Peggy Rickman, Midhurst, England
- Cosgrove, Tom (editor) (1973), William Hill Racing Yearbook 1973, The Queen Anne Press, London, UK
