= Simon Holt (commentator) =

British horse racing commentator (born 1964)

Simon Holt (born 18 April 1964) is a British horse racing commentator. From the beginning of 2000 to the end of 2016, he was the main race commentator for Channel 4.

== Commentary career ==
Holt became a racecourse commentator in 1988, and made his TV debut for Channel 4 on 30 September 1994 at Newmarket.

He rose through the commentating ranks quickly, and was race-calling alongside Graham Goode for the SIS feed for the Grand National in 1990. The pair went on to commentate on the race together until 1997. Holt was also racecourse commentator at Newmarket during the Guineas meeting whilst positioned out in the country, and has been grandstand commentator at Royal Ascot since the mid-1990s.

From the beginning of 1995 he was heard regularly, sometimes as a race commentator but sometimes in the now defunct job of betting and results reader. He replaced Raleigh Gilbert as Channel 4's second commentator, calling the first part of the race at tracks such as Newmarket before handing over to Goode in the grandstand. Goode at that time remained Channel 4's main race commentator, but in the late 1990s Holt covered more and more races such as the Whitbread Gold Cup and the Tingle Creek Chase at Sandown Park.

Holt became the main commentator from the beginning of 2000, and his first meeting as Channel 4's senior race-caller came at Uttoxeter for the 'new millennium's first race-meeting'. He only covered the Derby and Oaks once for Channel 4, however, before BBC Sport took over coverage from Epsom in 2001. From 2013 to 2016 he called the Derby and the Oaks again for Channel 4 whilst the channel held the rights to terrestrial coverage. He covered many important events for Channel 4 including the Cheltenham Festival, 1,000 and 2,000 Guineas, St Leger, King George VI Chase and, from 2007, Glorious Goodwood. He also called the Irish Derby once (in 2000 when Sinndar triumphed as RTÉ used the BBC's Jim McGrath to call the race in the absence of Tony O'Hehir), as well as the 2001 Prix de l'Arc de Triomphe when the TV rights briefly transferred from the BBC to Channel 4.

From 2013 to 2016, he was lead commentator for Channel 4 Racing's coverage of the Royal Ascot meeting.

He remained a regular racecourse commentator throughout his time at Channel 4, often working at his local tracks, Lingfield Park, Plumpton, Brighton and Fontwell Park.

In October 2010, Holt commentated on some of the minor sports, including bowls, at the Commonwealth Games in Delhi for the BBC.

== Writing ==
Holt regularly writes for sportinglife.com.
