= Morphsuits =

Scottish spandex costume company

AFG Media o/a Morphsuits
- Type: Private
- Industry: Fancy dress/costume
- Founded: 2009
- Founder: Ali Smeaton, Fraser Smeaton, Gregor Lawson
- Headquarters: Edinburgh, Scotland, United Kingdom
- Key people: Smeaton, Smeaton, Lawson
- Products: Morphsuits, Morphsuits Kids
- Revenue: £33.1 million (2022)
- Operating income: 3,146,554 pound sterling (2025)
- Net income: 2,051,286 pound sterling (2025)
- Owner: Smeaton, Smeaton, Lawson
- Number of employees: 22 direct
- Website: www.morphsuits.com

Morphsuits is a company in Edinburgh, Scotland that distributes branded spandex costumes that cover the entire body, a brand of zentai suit. Offering over 80 different designs, it was founded in 2009 by brothers Ali and Fraser Smeaton and their flatmate Gregor Lawson.

It later added children's sizes, called MorphKids, and female-targeted accessories.

It is a division of AFG Media, which includes menswear line Foul Fashion and golf wear line Royal & Awesome.

== History ==
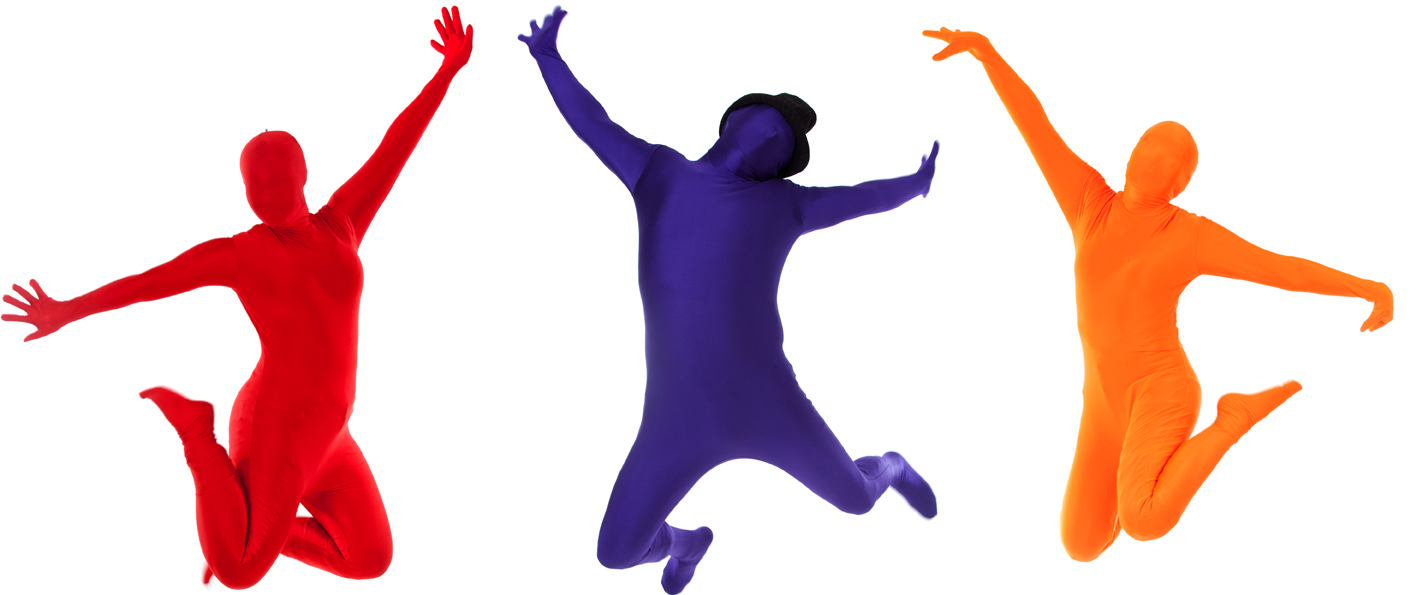
Three people in Morphsuits jump for a photoshoot.

According to the founders' account, they were inspired to create the company after a one-color costume party in Dublin, to which a friend of the founders was wearing a zentai bodysuit. At the event, the friend became somewhat of a celebrity, being bought drinks and posing for hundreds of pictures. After researching the fancy dress market, Smeaton, Smeaton, and Lawson invested £1,000 each. The original corporate website cost $300.

Beginning in May 2009, shipping of the first batch of 200 costumes was done from their flat. Balancing their day jobs and the company meant "a lot of 2 a.m. finishes" while running their business. As of August 2011, outsourcing had raised their indirect staffing to 200. As of late 2012, suits were manufactured in Shanghai.

The company received a boost to its sales when the 2009 British Lions tour of South Africa, at which eight fans wore red Morphsuits, was covered extensively by sports journalists and photographers.

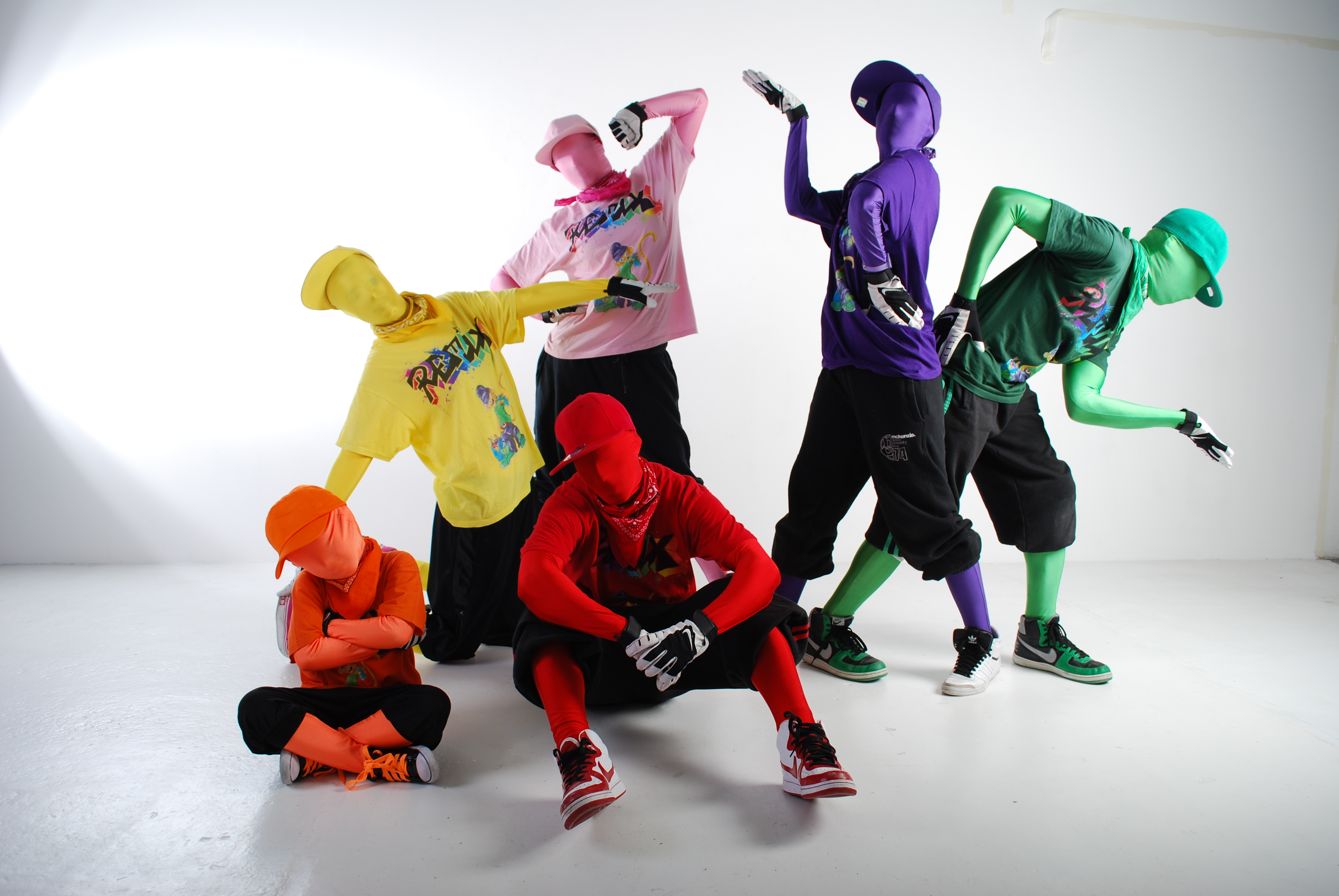
UK-based Remix Monkeys, in 2011. The group used Morphsuits in their street dance routines.

As of August 2011, there were 40 varieties, and 50 as of September 2011. MorphKids, a child's-sized line, was launched in the United States before any other market. The company sold 35,000 units in 48 hours. Around Halloween 2012, a psychologist noted increased confidence and social skills in children wearing the outfits, and an "overall calming effect" in children with autism. In October 2012, Morphsuits launched their first licensed design, featuring Saban's Mighty Morphin' Power Rangers; the company claims the costumes were the "best-selling item" in their history. In 2013 Morphsuits added "Animal Planet" Morphsuits, including a Vampire Bat with fabric wings connected to the arms, and a Cobra with a neck frill. Other products include the head-only lycra Morphmask and Megamorph, an inflated suit with lycra over the head, hands, and feet.

== Corporate ==
As of 2011, Gregor Lawson had worked in brand management for eight years. Trained with "FMCG marketing" (fast-moving consumer goods) at Gillette and later Procter & Gamble, he led marketing on Pantene, Pringles, and Gillette. He left P&G in July 2010. Lawson is brother of rugby union player Rory Lawson, son of rugby union player Alan Lawson, and grandson of rugby union commentator Bill McLaren.

In their first year, the company sold 20,000 costumes, bringing in £1.2 million. Between January and October 2010, the company shipped 10,000 units to Canada. In the 2010-2011 financial year, they did £4.5m in sales. In October 2010, Morphsuits gave 2011 estimates of £6 million; by July 2011, they told the BBC of a year-end estimate of £10 million. The company sold an initial order of 100,000 Morphsuits to retail chain Party City.

Fiscal year	Units sold	Revenue
2009–10	50,000	£1.2m
2010–11	250,000	£4.5m or £4.2m

As of 2011, the partners had no direct employees, with all roles being outsourced. As of summer 2011, that included a Chinese manufacturer, warehouses in the United States, United Kingdom, and Australia, and a customer contact centre in Fife. In 2012, Mishal Verjee was added as Marketing Director. One September 2012 article cited AFG in employing 21 staff at five sites worldwide, but did not clarify if they were direct or outsourced.

The founding entrepreneurs have spoken publicly about their dislike for UK tax rules, which make "company owners pay 40 percent on any sum taken out in dividends above £35,000, against only 10 percent if they were to sell their business." They have suggested incentives to expand operations would be more beneficial than "inducements" to sell their company. The company received overtures from private equity investors in 2011, since their Ernst & Young Entrepreneur of the Year Awards nomination in Scotland, that year; they have suggested the business has kept them too busy to consider any of the offers.

In February 2012, the company (as AFG Media) received a £600,000 loan from Barclays Corporate.

In July 2012, Business Growth Fund invested £4.2 million in AFG, the size of its stake was unannounced, but their firm generally takes between 10% and 40% of the share capital. The investment was meant to help product development, the MorphKids line, and develop supply chain as the company looks to expand in the US, Europe, Mexico, Russia, Japan and China. Ralph Kugler was introduced as chairman of the company's board, and Duncan Macrae also added to the board.

They have a low rate of product return, at just 1%, which they credit to the limited SKU (stock-keeping unit), allowing them to ensure consistent quality of the product.

== Marketing ==
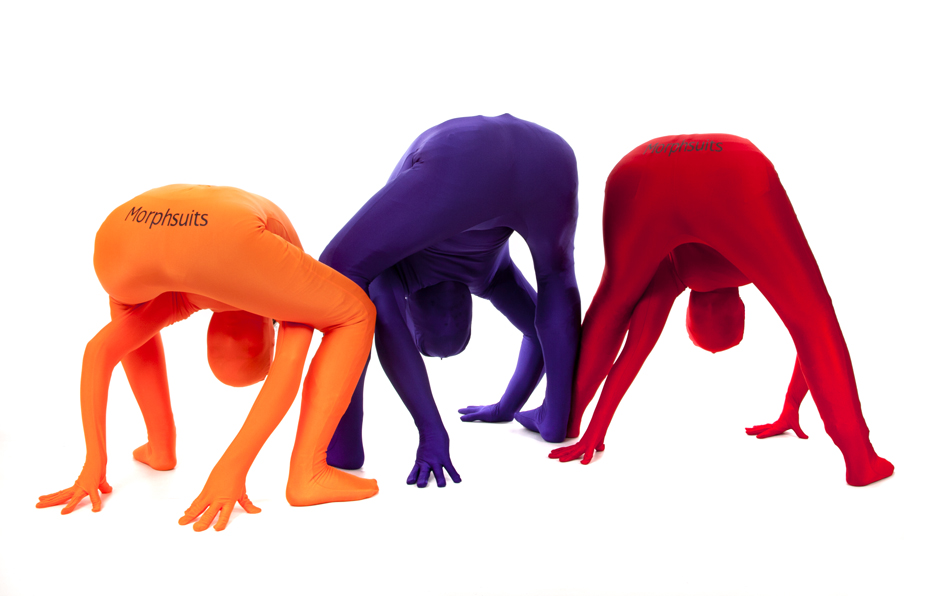
The Morphsuits branding is on each costume, advertising the company.

Gregor Lawson has spoken at seminars about technology and business, about their use of Facebook and e-commerce. Much of their marketing strategy is based on fans' ideas, a process Fraser Smeaton calls "scrum marketing"; suit designs, potential sales outlets, and competitions have all been dictated by its followers.

There are regional sales differences: in the United Kingdom, the product is considered year-round, with a small jump in sales near Halloween. In the United States, sales are much more highly focused at the Halloween season. The company runs 13 localized e-commerce websites.

Black is the company's most popular colour. The majority of Morphsuits' customers are men, but the company hopes that a new morphsuit model with a built-on tutu will expand female sales.

The brand has tried to distance itself from the term zentai, and the concept of fetish usage. Being one of the earliest brands to court a general market, the terms "Morphsuits" and "morphs" are regularly applied to events related to any sort of zentai suit. Their term risks becoming a genericized trademark in the process; one New Zealand newspaper refers to a competing brand, Jaskins, as a "one of the main online morphsuit brands."

For a while, the website's FAQ page listed the suits as legal globally. This response either ignored or overlooked Anti-mask laws, such as those in France.
