= ITV Racing =

British sports TV programme

- Also known as: Racing on STV (Northern and Central Scotland)
- Genre: Sports
- Presented by: John Rickman (1969–1977); Ken Butler (1969-1980); Brough Scott (1971–1985, 2017–present); John Oaksey (1969–1985); John McCririck (1981–1985); Derek Thompson (1981–1985); Jim McGrath (1981–1985); Ed Chamberlin (2017–present); Oli Bell (2017–present); AP McCoy (2017–present); Alice Plunkett (2017–present); Mick Fitzgerald (2017–present); Francesca Cumani (2017–present); Chris Hughes (2018–present); Kevin Blake (2018–present)
- Country of origin: United Kingdom
- Original language: English

Production
- Production location: Racecourses throughout the United Kingdom
- Running time: 150–270 minutes
- Production company: ITV Sport

Original release
- Network: ITV
- Release: 4 October 1969 – 28 September 1985
- Network: ITV; ITV3; ITV4
- Release: 1 January 2017 – present

Related
- World of Sport; Grandstand; Channel 4 Racing

ITV Racing is a sports television programme produced by ITV Sport for races shown on ITV1 and STV, ITV3 or ITV4 in the United Kingdom. The programme is referred to as Racing on STV in Northern and Central Scotland. In its previous incarnation, the show was an essential part of World of Sport.

== History ==
=== 1969-1985 ===
It started on 4 October 1969 when the programme began to show horse racing from two courses each week rather than one, under the title "They're Off". In 1972 it changed to The ITV Seven, reflecting the number of races it showed each week. The ITV Seven was also the title of an accumulator bet where vast sums of money could be won if you correctly predicted the winners of all seven races. However prior to 1969 Racing was a World Of Sport mainstay from the start in January 1965 ITV having first started televising Racing in 1955 with The Derby starting ITV coverage in 1960.

The feature was sometimes known (especially in later years) as the ITV Six, the ITV Five or even the ITV Four, if fewer races were being shown. On these occasions, the bet would be on the remaining televised races and would be comparatively simpler to win, however it was still fairly difficult to win with, on just one bet.

The weekly live coverage came from racecourses such as Sandown Park, York, Newmarket, Doncaster, Newcastle and Redcar. More minor tracks like Warwick, Catterick and Market Rasen were also extensively featured, especially during the National Hunt season in the winter, when ITV had the rights to fewer of the big races. Meetings from Goodwood and Haydock Park appeared occasionally, and a meeting from Ascot was shown as a one-off in 1977 when the BBC were covering the Grand National at Aintree. From January 1980 onwards, meetings from Kempton Park were shown regularly - before that time, Kempton meetings were on the BBC and were featured on Grandstand.

When racing was impossible due to the weather, greyhound racing would often be shown instead in the days before all-weather horse racing.

In the 1980s ITV reduced its racing coverage, and often in the last years of World of Sport, only one meeting would be shown. The last ITV Seven came from Kempton Park and Thirsk on 7 September 1985, three weeks before the last World of Sport, which only covered one meeting, at Redcar. ITV's midweek racing coverage had already been on Channel 4 since 22 March 1984. From 5 October 1985, the Saturday afternoon coverage also moved to the fourth channel, permanently becoming Channel 4 Racing, although it was reduced in scope considerably at the start of 1986, and would not become as extensive as it was in the ITV era until the late 1990s. For a few years, ITV did continue to show The Derby, simulcasting Channel 4's coverage, but stopped doing so after the 1988 event.

=== 2017-present ===
In January 2016, it was announced that ITV had regained horse racing rights from Channel 4 to take effect from 1 January 2017. 60 days of racing will be shown on ITV4, while 40 days of racing will be shown on ITV. ITV broadcasts big events such as the Grand National, Cheltenham Festival, Epsom Derby, Royal Ascot, Glorious Goodwood and British Champions Day, as well as regular Saturday meetings. ITV4 broadcasts The Opening Show, the morning preview programme similar to The Morning Line on Channel 4, and many other Saturday meetings, as well as the occasional weekday and Sunday meeting, at courses all over the UK and Ireland.

=== Presenters ===
Over the years, the live coverage was presented by John Rickman (until 1977), Brough Scott, Ken Butler, (until 1980) Lord Oaksey (initially known on the programme as John Lawrence, and subsequently becoming John Oaksey after he succeeded to the peerage), and Derek Thompson and Jim McGrath (from 1981-1985). Race commentators were Tony Cooke and Bob Haynes (in the first couple of years), John Penney and Raleigh Gilbert (the main commentators from 1972 to 1980) and Graham Goode (the main commentator from 1981). But on occasions when ITV showed Greyhound Racing on World of Sport from Harringay, Crayford and Wembley Gary Newbon was the presenter and Reg Gutteridge the race commentator

Upon the programme's relaunch in 2017, Ed Chamberlin was announced as the main presenter, with Francesca Cumani joining him at the start of the flat season. Oli Bell presents the morning magazine programme, The Opening Show, and also acts as a relief presenter when Chamberlin or Cumani are unavailable. Rishi Persad, previously of the BBC and Channel 4 Racing, is also a relief presenter.

Richard Hoiles is the primary racing commentator, calling the channel's flagship meetings. In 2021, Hoiles also acted as a relief presenter at Wincanton when the four primary presenters were in Del Mar covering the Breeders' Cup. Mark Johnson is the ITV Racing's secondary commentator, calling races from the second meeting of the day. Ian Bartlett was the tertiary commentator until the 2022 Grand National, where he stepped down from the role after 18 years of calling the world's most famous steeplechase on terrestrial television. Bartlett still makes regular appearances on ITV as a racecourse commentator. Stewart Machin took over the tertiary commentary position in 2021, and occasionally covers the main meeting of the day when both Hoiles and Johnson are absent.

== On air team ==
Years	Presenter	Current role
2017–present	Ed Chamberlin	Main presenter
2017–present	Francesca Cumani	Flat racing presenter
2017–present	Oli Bell	The Opening Show, relief presenter, reporter
2017–present	Richard Hoiles	Main commentator
2017–present	Mick Fitzgerald	Analyst, reporter
2017–present	Luke Harvey	Analyst, reporter
2017–present	Jason Weaver	Flat racing analyst
2017–present	Alice Plunkett	National Hunt reporter
2017–present	Rishi Persad	Relief presenter, reporter
2017–present	Sir AP McCoy	Analyst
2017–present	Brian Gleeson	Betting reporter
2017–present	Sally Anne Grassick	Reporter
2017–present	Matt Chapman	Reporter
2017–present	Johnny Murtagh	Analyst
2017–present	Hayley Turner	Analyst
2017–present	Charlotte Hawkins	Lifestyle and fashion presenter
2017–present	Mark Heyes	Lifestyle and fashion presenter
2017–present	Mark Johnson	Secondary commentator
1971–present	Brough Scott	Analyst
2018–present	Kevin Blake	Analyst
2018–present	Andrew Thornton	Analyst
2019–present	Ruby Walsh	Analyst
2020–present	Adele Mulrennan	Analyst, reporter
2020–present	Natalie Green	Race day presenter
2021–present	Leonna Mayor	Analyst, reporter
2021–present	Megan Nicholls	Analyst, relief presenter
2021–present	Ken Pitterson	Paddock Expert
2021–present	Stewart Machin	Tertiary commentator
2021–present	Dan Barber	Sunday Series analyst
2023–present	Tom Scudamore	Analyst
2023–present	Michelle Payne	Royal Ascot Analyst
2024–present	Sam Quek	Social Stable reporter
2025–present	Tom Collins	Opening Show tipster
2017–2022	Ian Bartlett	Tertiary commentator
2017–2021	Gabriel Clarke	Features reporter
2017–2018	Lucy Verasamy	Weather presenter
2017–2018	Eva O'Donoghue	Veterinary expert
2018–2018	Emmet Kennedy	Social Stable Reporter
2019–2024	Chris Hughes	Social Stable Reporter
2017–2017	Victoria Pendleton	Analyst
