= Channel 4 Racing =

- The final logo of Channel 4 Racing
- Presented by: Brough Scott (1984–2001); John Oaksey (1984–1999); Derek Thompson (1984–2012); John McCririck (1984–2012); Jim McGrath (1984–2016); John Francome (1986–2012); Mike Cattermole (1995–2016); Alistair Down (2001–2009); Emma Spencer (2001–2016); Alice Plunkett (2001–2016); Nick Luck (2010–2016); Clare Balding (2013–2016); Mick Fitzgerald (2013–2016); AP McCoy (2015–2016)
- Voices of: Graham Goode (1984–1999); Raleigh Gilbert (1984–1996); John Penney (1984–1994); John Tyrrell (betting/results) (1984–1994); Simon Holt (1994–2016)
- Country of origin: United Kingdom
- Original language: English

Production
- Producers: ITV Sport (1984–1992); Three on Four (1993–1996); Highflyer (1997–2012); IMG Sports Media (2013–2016)

Original release
- Network: Channel 4 More4
- Release: 22 March 1984 – 27 December 2016

Channel 4 Racing was the name given to the horse racing coverage on the British television stations Channel 4 and More4, which aired from 1984 to 2016.

== History ==
The first transmission of racing on the channel was on 22 March 1984 from Doncaster, as it took over midweek coverage that had previously been on ITV. On 5 October 1985, the week after World of Sport ended, Channel 4 took over ITV's Saturday afternoon coverage.

From the beginning of 1986, however, the amount of racing covered, especially on Saturday afternoons, was substantially reduced with coverage focussing on Newmarket, Epsom, Doncaster, York, Sandown Park, Kempton alongside visits to Ayr for the Scottish Grand National and Ayr Gold Cup meetings and Newcastle for the Eider Chase, Northumberland Plate and Fighting Fifth Hurdle. Race meetings dropped would be the small/medium tracks that were covered by World Of Sport Warwick, Nottingham, Market Rasen, Ripon, Beverley, Towcester, Stratford, Catterick, Fakenham, Fontwell, Sedgefield, Plumpton, Redcar, Thirsk, Hereford, Lingfield Park, Hexham, Kelso, Worcester, Uttoxeter, Salisbury, Wincanton, Southwell, Windsor, Wolverhampton, Wetherby although the BBC occasionally televised meetings from those tracks mostly the Saturday cards on Grandstand (Most of these courses would return from around 1993). However, coverage from Chester was added in 1989, in 1995 Cheltenham was snatched from the BBC, in 2001, the year of the foot-and-mouth disease crisis, Epsom would switch to the BBC (Channel 4 would return with the Derby and Oaks in 2013), in 2002 Newbury joined the roster, 2007 Goodwood started being covered full time (after a period of being shared with the BBC), in 2008 came Haydock Park full time (after a few years of sharing with the BBC) and gained Ascot at first only the jumps meetings while the big flat meetings stayed with the BBC until 2012, 2011 Aintree would be added with the Becher Chase card (Aintree would come full time in 2013)

From the start of 2007, Channel 4 Racing mainly, but not exclusively, featured meetings from the Racing UK courses having initially signed a three-year contract which ran throughout 2007, 2008 and 2009. The contract guaranteed 80 days of racing each year on Channel 4. Coverage was sponsored by Totesport in 2006 and 2007, and by Dubai from 2008 to 2016.

From 2013, Channel 4 Racing became the exclusive home of free-to-air televised racing, having signed a four-year deal in March 2012. Coverage included all major races including The Derby, Cheltenham Festival and for the first time on Channel 4, the Grand National and Royal Ascot, and international races including the Dubai World Cup and the Prix de l'Arc de Triomphe.

=== End of Channel 4 Racing ===
On 1 January 2016 it was announced that Channel 4 had lost their horse racing rights after 32 years to ITV who would have exclusive free to air rights to British horse racing from 1 January 2017. The reason for the change was said to be that ratings had dipped for most of the big meetings that used to be broadcast on the BBC up to 2012 since the move to Channel 4. Under the new deal ITV will show a minimum of 40 days of horse racing live on ITV, with a further 60 days a year live on ITV4, with ITV Sport also producing their own ITV Racing coverage rather than Independent Producers.

Initially, it was announced that Channel 4 would broadcast their final day of horse racing on 31 December 2016, with the rights moving to ITV on the following day. It was announced at the start of December 2016 however that the last day of racing would not be on 31 December. Owing to logistical problems, the last day of Channel 4 Racing was on 27 December 2016, when Channel 4 screened action from Kempton's Christmas meeting as well as the Welsh Grand National from Chepstow. As New Year's Eve fell on a Saturday that year, this meant it was the first Saturday in recent memory that horse racing was not shown on terrestrial television. Instead, pay channel Racing UK made its coverage available free to air for the day.

== Coverage ==
Major UK events covered by Channel 4 included the 1,000 Guineas and 2,000 Guineas at Newmarket, the Derby and Oaks from Epsom and the St Leger at Doncaster, Royal Ascot and the Cheltenham Festival. These events have moved between the BBC, ITV and Channel 4 over the years.

Internationally, it has covered the Triple Crown, Arlington Million, Breeders' Cup in the USA, the Canadian International in Canada, Caulfield Cup, Cox Plate, Melbourne Cup in Australia, the Japan Cup in Japan, Hong Kong Cup in Hong Kong, the Prix de l'Arc de Triomphe, Prix du Jockey Club, Prix de Diane in France, the Grosser Preis von Baden in Germany and the Dubai World Cup in the UAE some until Channel 4 showed them had not been seen on British TV. As well as the UK and Ireland Channel 4 has covered racing in 8 countries France, Germany, UAE, Japan, Hong Kong, Australia, USA and Canada.

== The Morning Line ==
In October 1989, Channel 4 Racing launched a weekly Saturday morning preview programme. Called The Morning Line, the programme aired for 25 minutes as part of Channel 4's recently launched breakfast television service. The programme would later be expanded to run for 60 minutes. The programme aired every Saturday and was shown regardless of whether Channel 4 was televising horse racing later that day. The programme also provided tips and advice for the forthcoming day's racing. The show featured contributions from a panel of racing pundits. Every Saturday the team of pundits had a virtual £100 with which they make their charity bet selections for the day. The final edition of The Morning Line aired on 26 December 2016. ITV4 broadcasts The Opening Show, the morning preview programme similar to The Morning Line, on Saturday mornings.

== Presenters ==
Since its inception in 1984, Channel 4 Racing featured many of racing's best known journalists and presenters, including Derek Thompson, Lesley Graham, John Francome, John Oaksey, John McCririck, Brough Scott, Mike Cattermole and Stewart Machin.

The line-up was refreshed by new production company IMG Sports Media in 2013. Former BBC anchor Clare Balding led coverage of major festivals such as Cheltenham, Aintree and Royal Ascot, whilst the rest of the time coverage was fronted by Nick Luck. Alice Plunkett and Emma Spencer filled in as presenters when both Balding and Luck were absent, and also served as interviewers and reporters on the programme alongside Gina Harding and Rishi Persad. Jim McGrath, Graham Cunningham, Mick Fitzgerald and occasionally former champion jockey AP McCoy provided analysis, whilst Tanya Stevenson, Brian Gleeson and Tom Lee were the programme's betting correspondents. After 2000 the senior commentator was Simon Holt, while Richard Hoiles commentated either at the second most important meeting of the day, or filled in for Holt when he was absent. Very occasionally Hoiles also acted as main presenter of the programme. Ian Bartlett was usually the third choice commentator.
