= Rory Lawson =

Scotland international rugby union player

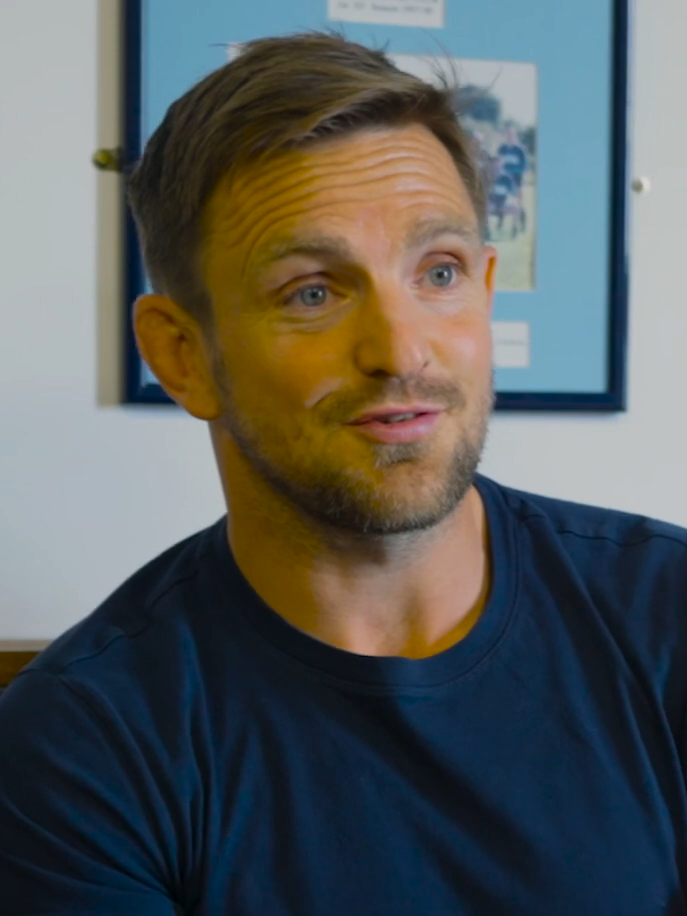
- Rory Lawson in 2023
- Born: Rory Gordon MacGregor Lawson; 12 March 1981 (age 45) Dunfermline, Scotland
- Height: 1.79 m (5 ft 10 in)
- Weight: 85 kg (13 st 5 lb)
- School: Dollar Academy
- Notable relative(s): Alan Lawson; Bill McLaren; Jim Thompson

Rugby union career
- Position: Scrum-half
Amateur team(s)
Years	Team	Apps	(Points)
- Heriot's FP
Senior career
Years	Team	Apps	(Points)
2003–2006	Edinburgh Rugby	22	(13)
2006–2012	Gloucester	151	(80)
2012–2013	Newcastle Falcons	23	(12)
International career
Years	Team	Apps	(Points)
2006–2010	Scotland	31	(0)

Rory Lawson (born 12 March 1981) is a Scottish former rugby union player who played his career in Scotland and England as a scrum half. He won 31 caps for Scotland.

He attended Dollar Academy where he captained the school's 1st XV. After a number of years playing amateur rugby for Heriots he then took a professional contract with Edinburgh Gunners in 2003 but in the summer of 2006 moved to the Guinness Premiership side Gloucester.

He gained his first international cap against Australia in the autumn of 2006, coming on as a substitute. He faced strong competition for the scrum-half position in the Scotland side from Mike Blair and Chris Cusiter, both of whom were British & Irish Lions. but still managed to captain Scotland. Lawson was a member of Scotland's 2007 Rugby World Cup squad. He joined Newcastle Falcons in 2012.

On 7 August 2013, Lawson announced his retirement from rugby on medical advice, due to a chronic wrist injury.

== Personal life ==
A grandson of commentator Bill McLaren and son of Scottish international scrum-half Alan Lawson, Lawson comes from a sporting family. His brother Gregor played for Scotland 7's and fullback for London Scottish FC, and after retiring founded Morphsuits, a fancy dress company. His cousin, Jim Thompson, is a fullback/centre with Edinburgh Rugby.

In 2018, he married India Lawson in East Lothian, Scotland. In 2019, they had a son together, Frederick Louis McLaren Lawson. In 2021, they welcomed another son, Louis James MacGregor Lawson.
