= Pete Graves =

British TV presenter

- Born: 7 April 1982 (age 44); Hexham, Northumberland
- Occupation: Sky Sports Presenter

Pete Graves has been a British television presenter working for British Sky Broadcasting and ITV Sport for their coverage of Professional Darts Corporation events.

He anchored live association football and rugby union matches on Sky Sports. He also co-presented on Sky Sports News and Sky News.

On 15 January 2026, it was announced that he will be presenting Professional Darts Corporation events on ITV Sport.

== Radio ==
Graves took over the position of head commentator on all Newcastle United matches working alongside Mick Martin.

Graves moved to Real Radio (formerly Century Radio) in 2007.

Graves wrote, produced and hosted a one-hour programme about Bobby Robson to mark his 75th birthday. The programme was aired again following Robson's death in July 2009.

== Television ==
In February 2009 Graves joined Sky Sports News as a reporter. However, from June 2009 he was used mainly as a Presenter.
