= Alan Lawson =

Scotland international rugby union player

- Born: Alan James Macgregor Lawson; 19 May 1948 (age 78) Kirkcaldy, Scotland
- Notable relative(s): Rory Lawson (son); Jim Thompson (nephew)

Rugby union career
- Position: Scrum half
Amateur team(s)
| Years | Team | Apps | (Points) |
- Edinburgh Wanderers
| – | Heriots | | |
| – | London Scottish | | |
Provincial / State sides
| Years | Team | Apps | (Points) |
- Edinburgh District
| - | Anglo-Scots | | |
| - | Middlesex County | | |
International career
| Years | Team | Apps | (Points) |
| 1972-80 | Scotland | 15 | (12) |

123rd President of the Scottish Rugby Union
- In office 2012–2013
- Preceded by: Ian McLauchlan
- Succeeded by: Donald Macleod

Alan James Macgregor Lawson (born 19 May 1948 in Kirkcaldy) is a former Scotland international rugby union player.

== Rugby Union career ==
=== Amateur career ===
He played for Edinburgh Wanderers. Lawson stated: 'When I played in the 1970s, Jimmy Thain, the head groundsman, regularly let us play on the international pitch, telling us: The pitch also has to be match fit.'

Lawson played for Heriots.

In the late 1970s he moved to London Scottish.

=== Provincial career ===
He was capped by Edinburgh District. Unusually, he was capped by Scotland before he was capped by a District side.

When he moved to London Scottish he represented Anglo-Scots and Middlesex County.

=== International career ===
He played scrum-half for Scotland on 15 occasions between 1972 and 1980. He made his test debut for Scotland against France at Murrayfield on 15 January 1972 and he played his last match for Scotland against Wales at Cardiff on 1 March 1980.

=== Administrative career ===
Lawson became the 123rd President of the Scottish Rugby Union. He served a one-year term from 2012 to 2013.

== Family ==
He is married to Linda, the daughter of rugby commentator Bill McLaren. The couple have three children: Rory, who is also a Scotland rugby union international; Gregor, a Scotland 7s international and entrepreneur founding fancy dress company Morphsuits; and a daughter Lindsay.
