= I Am Maximus =

Thoroughbred racehorse

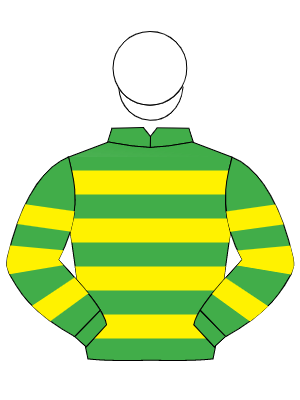
- Racing silks of Owner John P McManus
- Sire: Authorized
- Grandsire: Montjeu
- Dam: Polysheba
- Damsire: Poliglote
- Sex: Gelding
- Foaled: 27 March 2016
- Country: France
- Trainer: Willie Mullins
- Record: 22: 7-5-2
- Earnings: £1,602,703

Major wins
- Irish Grand National (2023); Grand National (2024, 2026); Drinmore Novice Chase (2023)

I Am Maximus (foaled 27 March 2016) is a French-bred and Irish-trained Thoroughbred racehorse which competes in National Hunt racing and won the Irish Grand National in 2023, and twice won the Grand National in 2024 and 2026.

== Racing career ==
I Am Maximus began his career being trained by Nicky Henderson, in the yard at Seven Barrows, Berkshire.

He made his debut ridden by Nico de Boinville in a bumper at Cheltenham on 24 October, 2020, winning from a field of 14 over 2 miles. He won over hurdles for the first time on December 15, 2021 at Newbury, from a field of 13.

In November 2022, I Am Maximus was moved to Willie Mullins’ stables based at Closutton, Bagenalstown, County Carlow, in the Ireland.

I am Maximus was entered for the 2023 Brown Advisory Novices' Chase at Cheltenham finishing 4th. Following this effort, I Am Maximus was sold by owner Claudio Michael Grech on the 22nd March 2023, for an undisclosed fee to Irish businessman J. P. McManus. Following this purchase, he won the Irish Grand National at odds of 8/1.

I Am Maximus entered the 2024 Grand National and was assigned a weight of 11st 6lb, Starting as the 7/1 joint favourite he went on to win the race by 7 and a half lengths.

For the 2025 Grand National I Am Maximus was assigned the heaviest weight of 11st 12lb,. and finished in second place. His starting price was 7/1 again making him slight second favourite to Iroko. However, 33/1 outsider Nick Rocket won the race that year.

I Am Maximus won the 2026 Grand National carrying the top weight of 11st 12lb, this time starting a heavy 9/2 favourite after being backed heavily before the race.

After his second Grand National win on 11 April 2026, his record was 7 wins, 5 seconds, 2 thirds, from 22 races. His career earnings totalled £1,602,703

== Grand National record ==
Grand National	Position	Jockey	Age	Weight	SP	Ref.
2024	1st	Paul Townend	8	11-6	7-1	
2025	2nd	Paul Townend	9	11-12	7-1	
2026	1st	Paul Townend	10	11-12	9-2	
