= Miles Harrison =

British rugby union commentator

Miles Harrison is a rugby union sports commentator who has worked for Sky Sports, ITV, Premier Sports, Channel 4, Prime Video, talkSPORT, and the BBC.

After obtaining a degree in Politics and Economic History from the University of York and a postgraduate qualification in Radio Journalism from City St George's, University of London, he worked for the BBC in York and Leeds. In the early 1990s, he moved to BBC Radio Sport where he covered rugby union, football, and cricket. He was part of the commentary team for BBC Radio’s coverage of the Wimbledon tennis tournament and was a regular presenter of the sports news on Today (BBC Radio 4).

In 1994, when Sky Sports obtained the rights to live club rugby, Harrison became their lead rugby union commentator. His work with Sky has included coverage of eight British and Irish Lions tours, England internationals, the Champions Cup, and various domestic competitions.

Harrison has commentated for ITV Sport at the 2007 Rugby World Cup and subsequent tournaments. He also contributed to the World Feed commentary during the 2015 Rugby World Cup Final, which reached a record global audience. He returned for the 2019 Rugby World Cup in Japan and the 2023 Rugby World Cup in France. At the 2011 Rugby World Cup, Harrison worked with Sky Television in New Zealand as a commentator and presenter.

Since 2016, he has been part of ITV Sport's Six Nations Championship coverage. From 2018 to 2022, he led commentary on Channel 4’s rugby broadcasts and, in 2022, he contributed to Prime Video's international rugby coverage. He became ITV’s lead commentator for Premiership Rugby and Champions Cup matches, starting in 2022. He joined Premier Sports in 2024 to continue his long-standing involvement in the Champions Cup.

Harrison previously worked for talkSPORT, presenting the station’s radio coverage of the 1999 Rugby World Cup and 2003 Rugby World Cup, and, more recently, commentating on international fixtures.

In 2021, Harrison limited his broadcast commitments during the British and Irish Lions tour due to recovery from colon cancer treatment. Conor McNamara replaced Harrison for that series.

He was named the 2007 Guinness Rugby Union Journalist of the Season. In 1997, he commentated on Sky's BAFTA-winning rugby union broadcast and has also contributed over the years to ITV's numerous BAFTA nominations for its rugby union coverage.

Harrison provided commentary for HB Studios’s Rugby World Cup 2011 video game and its successors. He previously voiced other rugby video games.

In print, Harrison has written two books published by Aurum Press: Best Seat in the House, about the 1997 British Lions tour to South Africa, and Grand Slam, a history of the Five Nations Championship. He also ghostwrote the autobiography of Welsh rugby player J. P. R. Williams, titled Given the Breaks.
