= Raleigh Gilbert =

Walter Raleigh Willock Gilbert, known as Raleigh Gilbert (28 February 1936 – c. February 1998) was a British horse racing commentator active for 40 years.

== Early life ==
Born in Devon and educated at Sherborne School, Gilbert rode as an amateur while living in Kenya in the mid-1950s, and began his journalistic career as racing correspondent for the East African Field and Farm in 1956 before returning to Britain and writing for the Sunday Post in Scotland.

== Commentary career ==
Gilbert began his career as a racecourse commentator in 1958, and eventually became the first person to commentate at every racecourse in the UK.

In the early 1970s he worked briefly for the BBC, commentating on the 1971 Grand National for BBC Television, but the dominance of Peter O'Sullevan and Julian Wilson on TV and Peter Bromley and Michael Seth-Smith on radio blocked his way, and in January 1972 he joined ITV as a commentator. From that year until the end of 1980 he was one of the commercial channel's two main commentators, along with John Penney - both were heard almost every Saturday on The ITV Seven (part of World of Sport) because ITV habitually covered two meetings every week. Although he never covered The Derby or Oaks for ITV (these were always the province of Penney), he commentated on many other major races, including the 1,000 Guineas, 2,000 Guineas, St. Leger, Irish Derby, Irish Oaks and Eclipse Stakes.

He also covered greyhound racing and polo for ITV, and continued to give racecourse commentaries on meetings not covered by ITV, such as Royal Ascot and the Cheltenham Festival. In common with a number of other racecallers, he provided radio voice-overs and mock commentaries for fictional television series.

From the beginning of 1981 onwards, Graham Goode became ITV's number one commentator, and Gilbert now covered fewer major races. His TV work declined further when the number of meetings covered by commercial television declined considerably from January 1986 onwards, but he was still heard quite often on ITV and later Channel 4 through the late 1980s and early 1990s, often commentating on the earlier stages of major races at Newmarket where two commentators were deemed necessary. His course commentaries continued, and he was a founder commentator with SIS in 1987, covering the Chester Cup on the day the service (which provided betting shops with live pictures of races) began. His final broadcast on Channel 4 was in January 1996 - at the end of his involvement with the channel he was only used as a betting and results reader.

However, he continued as a racecourse commentator (also heard on SIS and The Racing Channel) though he was due to soon retire at the time of his death. A week before he was found dead in his flat in London, he had missed a commentating assignment (at Wolverhampton on 21 February) for the first time in his career.
