= Jim Thompson (rugby union) =

Scottish rugby union player

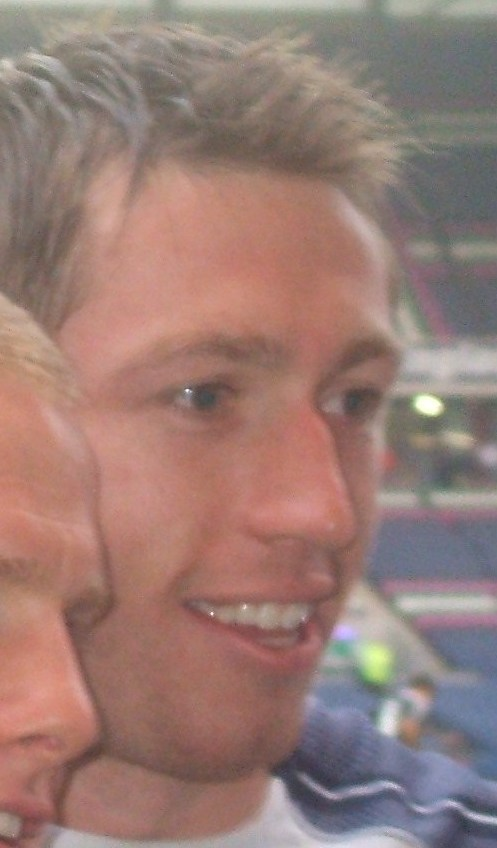
- Thompson with Scotland 7s at the 2008 Edinburgh 7s
- Born: James Gordon Thompson; 5 November 1984 (age 42) Catterick, North Yorkshire, England
- Height: 6 ft 1 in (1.85 m)
- Weight: 14 st 4 lb (91 kg)
- School: Stewart's Melville College; Dollar Academy
- University: Napier University
- Notable relative(s): Derek Thompson (father); Rory Lawson; Alan Lawson; Bill McLaren (grandfather)

Rugby union career
- Position: Fullback
Amateur team(s)
Years	Team	Apps	(Points)
2003–2007	Heriot's		
Senior career
Years	Team	Apps	(Points)
2007-2012	Edinburgh Rugby	61	(35)
2012-	London Scottish	51	(30)
International career
Years	Team	Apps	(Points)
2008	Scotland A	12	(22)
2007	Scotland Club XV		
National sevens team
Years	Team		Comps
2007–2013	Scotland		IRB Series; RWC 7s FIRA-AER 7s Series; Melrose Sevens

James Gordon Thompson (born 5 November 1984) is a Scottish former professional rugby union player who played as a full-back.

He represented Scotland in rugby sevens at 18 World Series tournaments and was once the top try scorer at the Scotland leg with six tries in one weekend.

He played a major role in helping Edinburgh Rugby get to the Semi Finals of the Heineken Cup where they lost to Ulster in the Aviva Stadium. His last act for Edinburgh was scoring a try in the Semi-final.

At the end of the 2011–12 season, his contract with Edinburgh Rugby expired and he left the club to join London Scottish, where he played from the beginning of the 2012–13 season. He quickly established himself as a key player at London Scottish, making 51 appearances over two seasons in the RFU Championship. He retired due to injury in January 2015.

== Club career ==
Thompson played his first match for Edinburgh Rugby while an academy player as a replacement against Leinster in the opening fixture of the 2007–08 Celtic League season. He signed a professional contract with Edinburgh in May 2008.

He joined Scottish Premier One side Heriot's in 2003 and was in the side who reached the final of the 2006 Melrose Sevens tournament. A tournament he would subsequently go on to win as part of the Scottish Thistles select side, formed of Scottish international sevens players, in the 125th Melrose Sevens in 2008.

He represented Scotland Sevens at 18 World series tournament and was once the top try scorer at the Scotland leg with six tries in one weekend.

In the draft of all players from the Scottish pro-teams (Edinburgh and Glasgow Warriors) to the Scottish Premier One rugby clubs in June 2008, Thompson was selected by Heriot's to be available to play for them during the 2008–09 season when not required by Edinburgh or any of the national teams.

His appearances at fullback were restricted at Edinburgh due to the return of Chris Paterson to the Edinburgh team in 2008, with whom he competed for the 15 jersey until Paterson retired in May 2012.

He played a major role in helping Edinburgh Rugby get to the Semi Finals of the Heineken Cup where they lost to Ulster in the Aviva Stadium. His last act for Edinburgh was scoring a try in the Semi-final.

At the end of the 2011–12 season, his contract with Edinburgh Rugby expired and he left the club to join London Scottish, where he has been playing since the beginning of the 2012–13 season. He quickly established himself as a key player at London Scottish, making 51 appearances over 2 seasons of the club's RFU Championship . He retired due to injury in January 2015.

== International career ==
Thompson has represented Scotland 7s in the IRB Sevens World Series on 18 occasions since making his debut in 2007 when he represented in every round of the 2007–08 season scoring a total of 122 points including 22 tries. In his debut tournament in Dubai he scored tries against both France and the Arabian Gulf rugby union team.

Thompson returned to the Scotland 7s squad for Rugby World Cup Sevens 2013 in Moscow featuring once as a substitute during the pool stage but starting both Scotland's matches during the knock-out stage of the Plate competition scoring one try.

In 2007, Thompson was part of the Scotland Club XV side who beat Ireland in a club international fixture shadowing the Six Nations match between the two countries' full international sides.

At the 2008 Churchill Cup, Thompson made a try scoring Scotland A debut against Argentina and took part in the final against England Saxons. Also in 2008, Thompson was part of the Scottish Thistles side (selected from the Scotland Sevens squad) which won the 125th Melrose Sevens tournament.

Thompson trained with the senior Scotland squad during the 2010 Six Nations Championship. Thompson was selected in the Scotland squad for the 2010 two-test summer tour to Argentina. He was one of four unused substitutes in the first test but dropped from the 22 for the second test.
