= Scottish rugby commentators and journalists =

This is a list of rugby commentators from Scotland. It includes TV commentators, radio commentators, and journalists.

== TV commentators ==
The most famous of TV commentators until recently was Bill McLaren, a Scotsman from Hawick and one of world rugby's best-loved personalities. He retired in 2002 and died in 2010.

Ian Robertson is also a Scottish TV commentator and former Cambridge Blue, with eight Scottish caps to his name. He is famous for commentating in the Rugby World Cup Final between England and Australia at Sydney in 2003. David Sole also does TV commentary. Andrew Cotter is also another well known commentator.

In January 2018, Derek Rae who had recently returned to the US to call selected Premier League matches and be a studio host for NBCSN, announced on his twitter feed that he would be calling Six Nations games for them too in 2018.

== Radio commentators ==
Bill Johnstone, nephew of Bill McLaren, leads the BBC Radio Scotland rugby commentary team on the Sportsound programme. He retired in 2017. John Beattie also does commentary and interviews such people as Sean Lineen and Andy Irvine. Other commentators include John Jeffrey and Gary Parker.

== Journalists ==
Allan Massie and Stuart Bathgate write in The Scotsman, and David Ferguson is the chief rugby writer of that paper. Kevin Ferrie is the chief rugby writer for the Glasgow-based Herald and Alasdair Reid also writes for the Herald.

Norman Mair has also written for The Scotsman and for Rugby World

David Kelso has been the most prolific freelance rugby writer, covering extensively for the Daily Record, Scottish Sun, Scottish Express and Sunday Mail.

== See also ==
- Scottish Rugby Union
- Scotland national rugby union team
