= 2024 Grand National =

176th Grand National horse race

- Grand National
- Location: Aintree
- Date: 13 April 2024
- Winning horse: (France) I Am Maximus
- Starting price: 7/1J
- Jockey: (Republic of Ireland) Paul Townend
- Trainer: (Republic of Ireland) Willie Mullins
- Owner: (Republic of Ireland) J.P. McManus
- Conditions: Soft

External videos
- Full replay of the 2024 Grand National Racing TV, YouTube
- Full replay of the 2024 Grand National ITV Racing, YouTube

The 2024 Grand National (officially known as the Randox 2024 Grand National for sponsorship reasons) was the 176th annual running of the Grand National horse race. It took place on Saturday 13 April 2024, at Aintree Racecourse near Liverpool, England. The event was sponsored by Randox Health. Changes from previous races were the reduction of horses from 40 to 34 and an earlier start time of 4pm, compared to 5.15pm in 2023. It was won by bookies' favourite I Am Maximus, who was trained by Willie Mullins and ridden by Paul Townend.

== Race card ==
Two horses, Run Wild Fred and Chambard, were withdrawn on the morning of the race after being found lame, reducing the field to 32 runners, the smallest field since the 1999 Grand National which also had 32 runners.

No	Colours	Horse	Age	Handicap (st–lb)	Odds	Jockey	Trainer
1		Noble Yeats	9	11-12	12/1	Harry Cobden	Emmet Mullins
2		Nassalam	7	11-8	50/1	Caoilin Quinn	Gary Moore
3		Coko Beach	9	11-8	28/1	Jordan Gainford	Gordon Elliott
4		Capodanno	8	11-8	28/1	Keith Donoghue	W P Mullins
5		I Am Maximus	8	11-6	7/1 JF	Paul Townend	W P Mullins
6		Minella Indo	11	11-6	28/1	Rachael Blackmore	Henry De Bromhead
7		Corach Rambler	10	11-6	15/2	Derek Fox	Lucinda Russell
8		Janidil	10	11-6	125/1	Jody McGarvey	W P Mullins
9		Stattler	9	11-5	40/1	Patrick Mullins	W P Mullins
10		Mahler Mission	8	11-5	18/1	Ben Harvey	John C McConnell
11		Delta Work	11	11-4	28/1	Jack Kennedy	Gordon Elliott
12		Foxy Jacks	10	11-4	33/1	Gavin Brouder	Mouse Morris
13		Galvin	10	11-2	40/1	Sam Ewing	Gordon Elliott
14		Farouk D'Alene	9	11-1	100/1	Donagh Meyler	Gordon Elliott
15		Eldorado Allen	10	11-0	66/1	Brendan Powell	Joe Tizzard
16		Ain't That A Shame	10	10-13	40/1	Mr. David Maxwell	Henry De Bromhead
17		Vanillier	9	10-12	14/1	Sean Flanagen	Gavin Cromwell
18		Mr Incredible	8	10-11	10/1	Brian Hayes	W P Mullins
20		Latenightpass	11	10-10	50/1	Miss Gina Andrews	Tom Ellis
21		Minella Crooner	8	10-10	125/1	Kevin Sexton	Gordon Elliott
22		Adamantly Chosen	7	10-9	33/1	Sean O'Keeffe	W P Mullins
23		Mac Tottie	11	10-9	80/1	James Bowen	Peter Bowen
24		Chemical Energy	8	10-9	50/1	Danny Gilligen	Gordon Elliott
25		Limerick Lace	7	10-8	7/1 JF	Mark Walsh	Gavin Cromwell
26		Meetingofthewaters	7	10-8	11/1	Danny Mullins	W P Mullins
27		The Goffer	7	10-8	50/1	Sean Bowen	Gordon Elliott
28		Roi Mage	12	10-8	66/1	James Reveley	Patrick Griffin
29		Glengouly	8	10-7	100/1	Michael O'Sullivan	W P Mullins
30		Galia Des Liteaux	8	10-7	28/1	Harry Skelton	Dan Skelton
31		Panda Boy	8	10-7	11/1	J. J. Slevin	Martin Brassil
32		Eklat De Rire	10	10-7	100/1	Darragh O'Keeffe	Henry De Bromhead
34		Kitty's Light	8	10-7	12/1	Jack Tudor	Christian Williams

== Finishing order ==
Placed horses

1: I Am Maximus

2: Delta Work

3: Minella Indo

4: Galvin

Position	Name
1	I Am Maximus
2	Delta Work
3	Minella Indo
4	Galvin
5	Kitty's Light
6	Ain't That A Shame
7	Meetingofthewaters
8	Galia Des Liteaux
9	Roi Mage
10	Limerick Lace
11	Coko Beach
12	Latenightpass
13	The Goffer
14	Vanillier
15	Eklat De Rire
16	Capodanno
17	Panda Boy
18	Nassalam
19	Noble Yeats
20	Eldorado Allen
21	Adamantly Chosen

== Non-finishers ==
A total of 21 out of 32 horses finished the race, leaving 11 non-finishers. Seven horses were pulled up, and four were due to unseated riders. While concerns were expressed for Mac Tottie, who was treated by veterinarians at the scene, all the horses returned safely. However, over the course of the 3 day meeting, if not over the Grand National fences, there were two equine fatalities.

Fence	Name	Fate
1	Corach Rambler	Unseated rider
9 (Valentine's Brook)	Stattler	Pulled up
15 (The Chair)	Mahler Mission	Unseated rider
15 (The Chair)	Mr Incredible	Unseated rider
21	Mac Tottie	Pulled up
26	Farouk D’Alene	Pulled up
27	Glengouly	Unseated rider
29	Chemical Energy	Pulled up
29	Foxy Jacks	Pulled up
29	Minella Crooner	Pulled up
30	Janidil	Pulled up after the final fence

== Broadcasting and media ==
"Minella Indo and Delta Work are the leaders from Kitty's Light in third, Latenightpass, then towards the inside I Am Maximus, Galvin comes next as they race towards the Elbow, Minella Indo, the loose horse forcing them to the left hand side and causing problems, Minella Indo has the lead from Delta Work, in third place and ridden along is I Am Maximus, who's now out after the leader, I Am Maximus for Paul Townend, goes past Minella Indo, Delta Work, Galvin and Kitty's Light, but up towards the line, it is I Am Maximus, who leads home the gladiators, for Paul Townend and Willie Mullins."

— ITV lead commentator Richard Hoiles describes the climax of the race.

As the Grand National is accorded the status of an event of national interest in the United Kingdom and is listed on the Ofcom Code on Sports and Other Listed and Designated Events, it must be shown on free-to-air terrestrial television in the UK. The race was broadcast live on TV by ITV for the seventh time, and the first year in its new three year deal with the British Horseracing Authority.

The ITV coverage was presented by Ed Chamberlin. Analysis was provided by former jockeys Sir Anthony McCoy, Mick Fitzgerald, and Ruby Walsh. Reports were provided by Alice Plunkett, Adele Mulrennan, Luke Harvey, Rishi Persad and Matt Chapman, and betting updates were provided by Brian Gleeson. Oli Bell covered viewers' comments on social media, and the commentary team was Mark Johnson, Stewart Machin and Richard Hoiles, who called the finish for the seventh time. Following the race, Bell and Walsh guided viewers on a fence-by-fence re-run of the race.
