= Brough Scott =

English racing journalist

Brough Scott MBE
- Born: John Brough Scott; 12 December 1942 (age 83); London, England
- Spouse: Susan E. MacInnes (m. 1973)
- Children: 4
- Relatives: J. E. B. Seely, 1st Baron Mottistone (grandfather)

John Brough Scott (born 12 December 1942) is an English horse racing journalist, radio and television presenter, and former jockey. He is also the grandson and biographer of the noted Great War soldier "Galloper Jack" Seely.

Scott was educated at Radley College and Corpus Christi College, Oxford, where he read History. His riding career saw him ride over 100 winners including the Imperial Cup and The Mandarin Handicap Chase. He joined ITV in 1971, and was regularly seen and heard on The ITV Seven and later Channel 4 Racing for thirty years. He also briefly presented football coverage for Channel 5. He was racing correspondent for The Sunday Times (where he succeeded Roger Mortimer) and wrote for the Racing Post (which he co-founded with Sheikh Mohammed), The Independent on Sunday and The Sunday Telegraph. He was appointed an MBE in the Queen's birthday honours list in 2009.

In 2013, Scott published Henry Cecil: Trainer of Genius, a book about Henry Cecil. It won the 2014 British Sports Book Awards in the "Best Horse Racing Book" category.

In 2017, forty-six years after he first broadcast on ITV, Scott returned to the channel when it resumed broadcasting horseracing after a long break.
