= Derek Thompson (sports commentator) =

English horse racing broadcaster

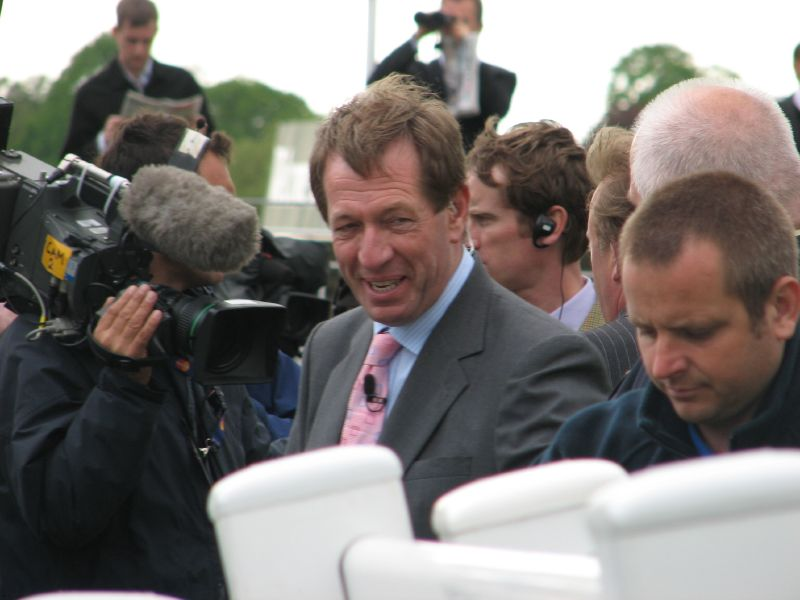
- Thompson in May 2006
- Born: 31 July 1950 (age 76); Stockton-on-Tees, County Durham
- Employer(s): BBC Sport (until 1981); ITV (until 1985); Channel 4 (until 2012)
- Known for: Sports presenting
- Children: Jim, Hugo Thompson
- Relatives: Bill McLaren (ex-father-in-law)

Derek Thompson (born 31 July 1950) is a retired British horse racing presenter and commentator.

== Biography ==
He was born to Stanley Moorhouse Thompson and Lillian Thompson in Stockton-on-Tees, County Durham. He had an older brother, Howard. Stanley Thompson was a small-time trainer of horses, which gave Derek his first rides as an amateur jockey. Through membership of the local hunt, he met future Grand National winning jockey, Bob Champion, and became a lifelong friend.

Thompson attended Guisborough Grammar School and was a promising showjumper. Thompson gave his first commentary – on a point-to-point meeting – at the age of 15. After leaving school in 1968, he worked unpaid for Denys Smith, nominally as assistant trainer. After six months, he moved to be assistant to Pierre Sanoner in Chantilly.

His broadcasting career began at the age of 18 on local radio. In 1972, he was based in London working for BBC Radio Sport, for whom he covered a number of Grand Nationals alongside Peter Bromley, Michael Seth-Smith and Michael O'Hehir.

In 1981, he moved to ITV, where he took a cut in salary to appear on World of Sport and midweek racing coverage. In 1985, he joined the newly formed Channel 4 Racing team as a presenter. He was also one of the team of three who unsuccessfully negotiated for the release of the kidnapped Epsom Derby winner Shergar. Thompson has also commentated for At the Races and was a regular on talkSPORT.

On 26 June 2012 Thompson stepped down from his duties for a short while to undergo surgery to remove a tumour from near his bowel. In October 2012, Thompson left Channel 4 Racing. He returned to BBC Radio for the duration of the Cheltenham Festival in 2013.

Thompson retired from commentating on horse races in 2025 and made his farewell commentary on 22 July 2025 at Wolverhampton Racecourse. He continues to work as an on-course raceday presenter.

Thompson considers online betting the biggest change he has seen to racing in his lifetime.

He is married to Caroline.

Thompson is also known for featuring in an advert for the Crown Hotel in Bawtry, Doncaster. In the video Thompson is seen saying "Are you well? I thought you were", which attracted the attention of Radio 1 Breakfast presenter Greg James.

== Bibliography ==
- Thompson, Derek; Mottershead, Lee (2013). Tommo: Too Busy To Die. Newbury, Berkshire: Racing Post Books. ISBN 978-1-909471-41-2.
