= Francesca Cumani =

Horse racing presenter

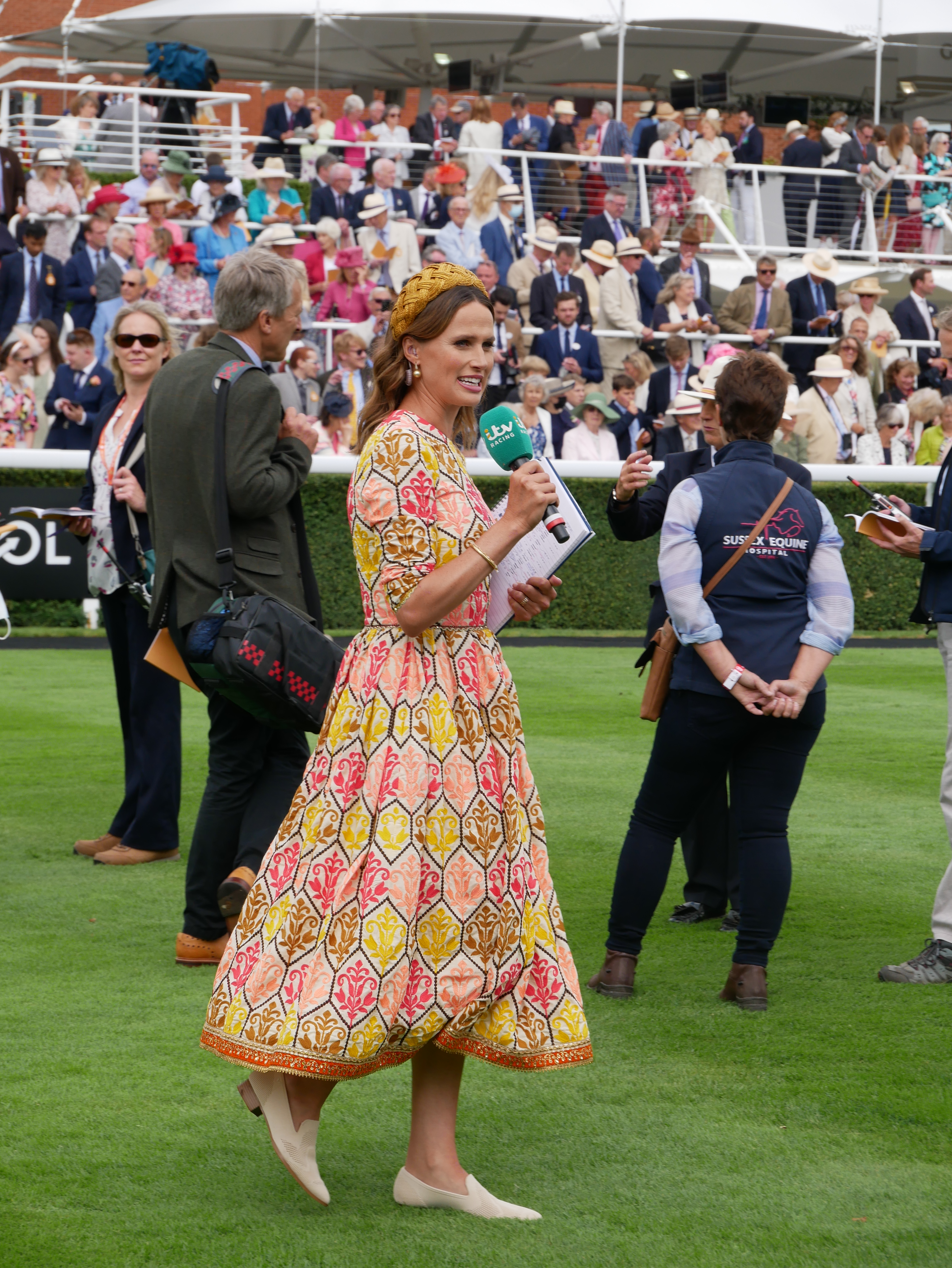
- Francesca Cumani presenting for ITV Racing at Goodwood, 2021
- Born: 1983 (age 42–43); Newmarket, Suffolk
- Education: University of Bristol
- Occupation: Television presenter
- Television: ITV; Nine Network
- Spouse: Rob Archibald (m. 2014; div. 2018)
- Partner: Max Johnson (2020-)
- Children: 3

Francesca Cumani is a horse racing presenter working for ITV Racing and Nine's Wide World of Sports. She has previously been part of the coverage of the Melbourne Cup with Seven Network and 10 Sport.

== Education ==
Cumani was educated at Tudor Hall School, a boarding and day independent school for girls, between the village of Bloxham and the market town of Banbury, in Oxfordshire. She left the school in 2001.

Following school, Cumani attended the University of Bristol, from which she graduated with a degree in French and Spanish.

== Career ==
After attending university Cumani worked in the family business of training and breeding race horses. After taking horses to Australia on a trip, she was offered an opportunity to be a guest presenter on Australia's Channel 7's horse racing broadcast. This led to a permanent job with CNN presenting Winning Post. She presented it in both English and Spanish. Cumani is also a presenter on Australia's Network 10 Melbourne Cup Coverage.

Cumani began working for ITV Racing in 2016. In February 2019 Ed Chamberlin and Cumani were joint winners of the Broadcast Sports Presenter of the Year at the SJA Awards.

== Personal life ==
Cumani was born in Newmarket, Suffolk, and is the daughter of trainer Luca Cumani. Francesca received her amateur jockey licence at the age of 18 and had four wins.

In 2014 Cumani married Australian international polo player, Rob Archibald. In April 2016 their son was born. In 2018 Cumani and Archibald separated. Following their separation, Cumani was in a relationship with fellow ITV Racing presenter, Oli Bell. They split in 2020. In December 2021, she announced that she was expecting her second child with partner Max Johnson. In June 2022, Cumani gave birth to a son, Teddy. Cumani gave birth to her third child in 2023.
