= Jim McGrath (British commentator) =

British horse racing commentator (born 1955)

Jim McGrath (born 22 May 1955) is an English horse racing pundit and broadcaster. He was associated with Timeform from 1974 until 2009. His nickname is "The Sage of Halifax". He is well known for his onscreen relationship with John Francome on Channel 4 Racing.

McGrath had an ambition to become a jockey, but after a summer at trainer Bill Marshall's yard at Whitsbury, he was advised that he wouldn't make the grade. On leaving Brunts School in Mansfield, McGrath joined publisher Timeform in 1974 "putting the glue on the cards." After five years, he became a racecourse reporter, in 2000 Managing Director and in August 2008 Chairman.

McGrath joined Channel 4 Racing at launch in 1984 as a pundit having started with ITV as a presenter in 1981. He was a member of the British Horseracing Board's Jump Racing Advisory Panel from 1993 until mid-2004. In 2004 he stepped down as a member of the Horserace Writers and Photographers' Association Committee. In 2005 he became an independent director of the British Horseracing Board, a nominee of the Jockey Club. and retained this position when the BHB became the British Horseracing Authority in July 2007.

McGrath is a breeder and owner, with current interests in horses in training with Sylvester Kirk, Jamie Osborne and Jonjo O’Neill.

McGrath gave notice of his intention to resign from Timeform on 22 December 2008. Timeform had been bought by Betfair in November 2006, but the reason for McGrath's resignation remained private. McGrath maintained his involvement with the charity race day at York in June which had been known from 1971 until 2008 as the Timeform Charity Day but in 2009 became the Macmillan Charity Day.

On 17 December 2016 it was announced on Channel 4 that this was to be his last appearance as part of the Channel Four Racing Team. However, when racing returned on ITV in January 2017, surprisingly, he did not come back to the network where he started his TV career.
