= Bill McLaren =

Scottish rugby union broadcaster

Bill McLaren CBE
- Born: William Pollock McLaren; 16 October 1923; Hawick, Scotland
- Died: 19 January 2010 (aged 86); Hawick, Scotland
- Employer: BBC Sport
- Known for: Sports commentating, sports journalism, rugby player
- Spouse: Bette Hill
- Children: 2
- Relatives: Alan Lawson (son-in-law); Rory Lawson (grandson); Jim Thompson (grandson)

William Pollock McLaren (16 October 1923 – 19 January 2010) was a Scottish rugby union commentator and journalist, having been a teacher and rugby player. Known as "the voice of rugby", he retired from commentating in 2002. Renowned throughout the sport, McLaren's enthusiasm and memorable turn of phrase endeared him to many.

== Early life ==
McLaren was born in Hawick, Roxburghshire, in 1923, to a knitwear salesman from Loch Lomond-side who had moved down to the area.

As a young boy, he was steeped in local rugby stories:

I was brought up on stories of the great Scottish players of the twenties, many of whom I never saw play but knew all about ... I used to go with my father to see matches at a very early age, the great Hawick heroes including Willie Welsh, Jock Beattie and Jerry Foster, so I had an all-consuming desire to wear the green jersey of Hawick.

In his teenage years, McLaren grew up to be a useful flank forward. He would later play for Hawick RFC.

He served with the Royal Artillery in Italy during the Second World War, including the Battle of Monte Cassino. He was used as a forward spotter, and on one occasion was confronted by a mound of 1,500 corpses in an Italian churchyard, an unpleasant experience which never left him.

He played in a Scotland trial in 1947 and was on the verge of a full international cap before contracting tuberculosis. The disease nearly killed him and forced him to give up playing. He spent 19 months in a sanatorium in East Fortune in East Lothian, where he was given the experimental antibiotic streptomycin, which saved his life; of the five patients given the drug, only two survived. While in the hospital, he began his broadcasting career, by commenting on table tennis games on the hospital radio.

== Career ==
McLaren studied Physical Education in Aberdeen, and went on to teach PE in different schools throughout Scotland right through to 1987. He coached several Hawick youngsters who went on to play for Scotland, including Jim Renwick, Colin Deans and Tony Stanger.

McLaren's journalistic career started as a junior reporter with the Hawick Express. In 1953, he made his national debut for BBC Radio, covering Scotland's 12–0 loss to Wales. He switched to television commentary six years later. McLaren was one of many post-war commentators who progressed from commentating on BBC Radio to BBC Television during the infancy of television broadcasting in the UK. These included Murray Walker (motor racing/Formula One), Peter O'Sullevan (horse racing), Harry Carpenter (boxing and rowing), Dan Maskell (tennis), David Coleman (athletics), Peter Alliss (golf) and John Arlott (cricket).

Recognition of his services came in November 2001, when he became the first non-international to be inducted into the International Rugby Hall of Fame. He was awarded an MBE in 1992, an OBE in 1995 and a CBE in the 2003 honours list. A Facebook group, backed by over 6,000 members, was campaigning to gain a knighthood for McLaren.

McLaren also featured as a commentator on the video games Jonah Lomu Rugby and EA Rugby 2001, and also did voice work for Telewest Communications.

During his final commentary, Wales v Scotland in 2002, the crowd sang "For He's a Jolly Good Fellow" and one Welsh supporter displayed a banner claiming "Bill McLaren is Welsh". He had particularly endeared himself to his many Welsh admirers with his comment "They will be singing in the valleys tonight"

After retirement, McLaren wrote the book Rugby's Great Heroes and Entertainers in 2003.

In later life, McLaren contracted Alzheimer's; he had been renowned for his excellent memory.

== Family ==
McLaren was married to Bette, with whom he had two daughters: Linda (born 1952) married former Scotland rugby scrum half Alan Lawson and Janie (born 1954, died 2000) married horse racing commentator Derek Thompson. They had five grandchildren, including Scotland scrum-half and Gloucester player Rory Lawson and Scotland 7s player Jim Thompson.

== Death ==
McLaren died on 19 January 2010 at the age of 86 in his home town of Hawick. His funeral took place on 25 January at Teviot Church in Hawick, followed by a private burial at the town's Wellogate Cemetery after his hearse was applauded through the town by hundreds of well-wishers who lined the streets.

On 11 March 2010, thousands of people attended a memorial celebration of Bill McLaren's life held at Murrayfield Stadium in the week leading up to that year's Calcutta Cup match which was played at the stadium.

A statue was unveiled in Wilton Park in Hawick in February 2013 followed in November that year by a bust of McLaren in the main reception area of Murrayfield Stadium. McLaren was named among the inaugural members of the Scottish Rugby Hall of Fame in 2010 and inducted into the World Rugby Hall of Fame during Rugby World Cup 2015.

== Bill McLaren Foundation ==
The Bill McLaren Foundation, a charity which exists to develop and promote rugby union and sporting opportunities, was launched at Murrayfield Stadium on 4 March 2010.

== See also ==
- Scottish rugby commentators and journalists
- Scotland national rugby union team
