= Timeline of athletics on UK television =

This is a timeline of the history of athletics on television in the UK.

== 1950s to 1970s ==
- Athletics coverage is a regular fixture on BBC Television with extensive live coverage during the summer months.

== 1980s ==
- 1981
  - 29 March – BBC1 airs highlights of the first London Marathon under the International Athletics strand.
- 1982
  - 29 March – The BBC covers the Great North Run for the first time, providing live coverage of the start and the end of the race. However it didn't cover the event again until the mid 1990s.
- 1983
  - 7–14 August – The BBC, ITV and Channel 4 show the first World Athletics Championships.
- 1984
  - 13 May – The BBC broadcasts full live coverage of the London Marathon for the first time although it had shown some live coverage of the 1982 and 1983 events.
- 1985
  - ITV takes over as broadcaster of UK athletics meetings. It also begins to cover European meetings in addition to the major international athletics events. Some of the coverage is shown on Channel 4, especially for midweek European meetings whereby Channel 4 shows the second hour of coverage.
- 1986
  - 26-31 August – Channel 4, in conjunction with ITV, shows coverage of the 1986 European Athletics Championships. This has been the only time that Channel 4 has broadcast coverage of this event.
- 1987
  - 28 August-6 September – ITV shows the World Athletics Championships for the second and final time. Some coverage is also shown on Channel 4, which does not show the event again until 2011.
- 1989
  - February – Eurosport launches and its output includes extensive coverage of European athletics meetings.

== 1990s ==
- 1990
  - 27 August-2 September – ITV broadcasts a major athletics championships for the final time when it broadcasts the 1990 European Athletics Championships. Coverage is restricted to a late-evening highlights package although ITV does show the final day's events live.
- 1991
  - 23 August-1 September – Eurosport broadcasts the World Athletics Championships for the first time. Terrestrial coverage is now shown exclusively by the BBC, which broadcasts morning-long coverage of the evening events.
- 1993
  - 13–22 August – For the first time, UK viewers are able to see full live coverage of the morning events of the World Athletics Championships. albeit only on Eurosport although the BBC does broadcast some morning live coverage.
- 1994
  - 7–14 August – Eurosport provides UK viewers with live coverage of the morning events from the European Athletics Championships for the first time as again the BBC only covered the evening events live and in full.
- 1996
  - ITV shows athletics for the final time. It had been reducing its coverage of the sport since the start of the 1990s.
- 1997
  - Channel 4 takes over as broadcaster of domestic athletics. It also shows the 1998 UK athletics season.
  - 1–10 August – For the first time, the BBC provides full live morning coverage of the morning events of the World Athletics Championships.
- 1998
  - 18–23 August – For the first time, the BBC provides full live morning coverage of the morning events of the European Athletics Championships.
- 1999
  - May – Domestic athletics returns to the BBC after more than a decade.

== 2000s ==
- No notable events.

== 2010s ==
- 2010
  - 12–14 March – ESPN broadcasts the 2010 World Indoor Athletic Championships.
- 2011
  - Channel 5 broadcasts the Great Birmingham Run and Great South Run for the first time.
  - 27 August-4 September – Channel 4 shows live coverage of the 2011 World Championships in Athletics but due to the broadcaster's decision to focus on Paralympic Sports, Channel 4 decides not to show the 2013 event even though it had bought the rights to the 2013 championships.
- 2012
  - 9–11 March – Channel 4 shows live coverage of the 2012 World Indoor Athletic Championships.
- 2013
  - 20–28 July – The World Para Athletics Championships are broadcast on UK television for the first time when Channel 4's sister channel More4 broadcasts over five hours of live coverage daily throughout the Championship. More4 also broadcasts the 2015 Championships.
  - 10–18 August – Coverage of the World Athletics Championships returns to the BBC.
- 2014
  - 7–9 March – The IAAF World Indoor Championships return to the BBC, having been with other broadcasters for the past few events.
  - 19–23 August – The IPC European Athletics Championships 2014 are broadcast on UK television for the first time when Channel 4's sister channel More4 screens full live coverage of the event.
- 2017
  - 14–23 July – Channel 4 broadcasts full live coverage of the 2017 World Para Athletics Championships with the previous producer of Channel 4's athletics coverage, Sunset + Vine, being host broadcaster for the championships.
- 2018
  - 14–15 July – Sky Sports broadcasts live coverage of the inaugural Athletics World Cup.

== 2020s ==
- 2021
  - 29 January-24 February – The BBC shows the 2021 World Athletics Indoor Tour.
  - 23 May – Live coverage of the Diamond League returns to the BBC following an agreement which will see the athletics series broadcast live on the BBC for the next four years. The deal began with the first of 14 meetings in the 2021 series on 23 May, with coverage available across BBC TV, BBC iPlayer, BBC Radio and BBC Red Button.
