= Jill Douglas =

British sports presenter

Jill Douglas MBE
- Born: December 1969 (age 56)
- Occupation: TV presenter
- Notable credit: RBS 6 Nations
- Spouse: Carl Hogg
- Children: 2

Jill Alison Douglas MBE (born December 1969), also known as Jill Douglas Hogg, is a British sports presenter, who appears on ITV, BBC and BT Sport. She grew up in Bonchester Bridge in the Scottish Borders. She was educated at Jedburgh Grammar School and worked as a journalist for the Southern Reporter before studying for a National Council for the Training of Journalists (NCTJ) qualification in print journalism at Napier College in Edinburgh.

She originally fronted Border TV's Lookaround news magazine in 1993 before moving to present BBC Scotland's rugby union coverage on Sportscene in 1997. In 1999, she joined Sky Sports as a sports news presenter, and was involved in both the rugby and Golden League athletics coverage.

In 2003 she rejoined the BBC as one of the main presenters of rugby union, cycling, and other events, such as the Olympic Games. She also sometimes appears on BBC Radio 5 Live's Fighting Talk. In 2013 Douglas presented the ITV4 coverage of the Haikou World Open and Champion of Champions Snooker.

Douglas is a keen supporter of Hawick Rugby Club. She is married to former Scotland international Carl Hogg. Douglas was awarded an Honorary Fellowship from Borders College in 2014. She was appointed President of Cheltenham Tigers Ladies RFC and subsequently President of the whole club.

She was appointed Member of the Order of the British Empire (MBE) in the 2022 New Year Honours for services to sport and charity.

== Charity work ==
In 2017 Douglas became the CEO of the "My Name'5 Doddie" Foundation, established by Doddie Weir to raise funds for research into Motor Neuron Disease.
