= The Racing Channel =

The Racing Channel was a British subscription television channel which used to extensively cover horse racing. It ran between 1995 and its closure in January 2003.

The Racing Channel was produced and transmitted by Satellite Information Services (SIS) direct to the home through Sky and cable television. Originally it was a high premium stand-alone channel costing £19.99 per month and was the first single-sport channel in the world. It did at one time attract 35,000 subscribers In November 2000, the rights in the channel reverted to the Race Course Association (RCA), with SIS continuing to produce and transmit the channel on a commercial basis for the Association. The channel was subsequently sold to The Racing Network International (TRNI) who took the decision to close the channel in January 2003.

== Demise ==
In 2001, BSkyB, Channel 4 and Arena Leisure (owners of 6 UK courses) signed a lucrative £307 million deal with 49 of the 59 UK racecourses for a 10-year period. This meant that the Racing Channel lost many of its top courses and was left with just 10 courses. The 10 courses did not feature any of the major meetings, and at this point the subscription fee was dropped and the channel was available more generally to Sky Digital subscribers. Nonetheless, the channel was clearly no longer viable.

At the time of its closure it had the contracts to cover meetings at ten of the minor courses in the country; Exeter, Fakenham, Hexham, Kelso, Leicester, Perth, Sedgefield, Stratford, Taunton and Towcester. These courses did not sign to the original attheraces. However, when this channel closed on 29 March 2004, these independent racecourses elected to join the relaunched At The Races portfolio of courses, rather than the new Racing UK channel.

== See also ==
- At The Races - channel which features 28 UK racecourses, including the 10 from the Racing Channel.
- Racing UK - a premium subscription channel featuring meetings from the other 31 UK racecourses.
