= Alice Plunkett =

British equestrian and sports journalist

Alice Plunkett (also known by her married name, Alice Fox-Pitt) is a British equestrian and sports journalist. She is a former eventer and National Hunt jockey and current presenter on ITV Racing in the UK.

She is the only female to have ridden at both Badminton Horse Trials and over the Grand National course at Aintree.

== Riding career ==
Plunkett started riding at hunts, which led to riding in point to points. That, in turn, led to her riding in the 1993 Fox Hunters' Chase at Aintree, one of the two main hunter chase races in the calendar. She was aged only 19 and it was only her fifth ride on a racecourse. She rode a horse called Bold King's Hussar, bred by her grandfather and finished fourteenth. She went on to ride winners on the flat, over hurdles and fences.

In her eventing career she rode at Badminton Horse Trials and also represented Great Britain at the European Three Day Event Championships under 21.

She gave up competitive riding in 2000, but has since ridden in charity races at the Cheltenham Festival.

== Broadcasting career ==
Plunkett was on the main Channel 4 Racing team from 2001 to 2016 and then with ITV when they took over racing coverage in 2017. In recent years she had been one of the lead presenters for National Hunt Racing coverage.

She has also been the BBC Radio 5 Live equestrian correspondent and has hosted equestrian events for Eurosport, Sky Sports and Horse and Country. She has also presented two series of equestrian interest show Horse Tails on Animal Planet.

== Personal life ==
She is married to eventer William Fox-Pitt. They have four children.
