= List of female Grand National jockeys =

Since 1977, female jockeys have been allowed in the Grand National horse race following the passing of the Sex Discrimination Act 1975. A total of 20 female jockeys have entered the Grand National since then. Charlotte Brew on her horse, Barony Fort, was the first woman to compete in the race, in 1977. In 1982 Geraldine Rees became the first woman to complete the course. She rode Cheers to eighth place. That time, Brew returned with her horse Martinstown; this was the first Grand National with two female jockeys entering.

In 1988, female participation was at an all-time high, as three women entered for the first time. Penny Ffitch-Heyes, Venetia Williams and Gee Armytage all started the race. None of their horses made the finish. In 2005, after an absence of 11 years, there was once again a woman entering the Grand National. Carrie Ford finished in fifth, tying Rosemary Henderson's record for the best performance by a woman up to that time.

In 2012, the first female jockey to finish in the top three was Katie Walsh on Seabass. In 2021, Rachael Blackmore, riding Minella Times, became the first female jockey to win the race. In 2025, Blackmore rode in her seventh Grand National, which is the record for a woman.

== Female jockeys ==
Year	Jockey	Horse	Position
1977	Charlotte Brew	Barony Fort	Did not finish (horse refused)
1979	Jenny Hembrow	Sandwilan	Did not finish (horse fell)
1980	Jenny Hembrow (2)	Sandwillan (2)	Did not finish (horse refused)
1981	Linda Sheedy	Deiopea	Did not finish (horse refused)
1982	Geraldine Rees	Cheers	8th (and last finisher)
1982	Charlotte Brew (2)	Martinstown	Did not finish (unseated)
1983	Geraldine Rees (2)	Midday Welcome	Did not finish (horse fell)
1983	Joy Carrier	King Spruce	Did not finish (unseated)
1984	Valerie Alder	Bush Guide	Did not finish (horse fell)
1987	Jacqui Oliver	Eamon's Owen	Did not finish (unseated)
1988	Penny Ffitch-Heyes	Hettinger	Did not finish (horse fell)
1988	Venetia Williams	Marcolo	Did not finish (horse fell)
1988	Gee Armytage	Gee-A	Did not finish (pulled up) Briefly led race at 19th fence.
1989	Tarnya Davis	Numerate	Did not finish (pulled up)
1994	Rosemary Henderson	Fiddlers Pike	5th
2005	Carrie Ford	Forest Gunner	5th
2006	Nina Carberry	Forest Gunner (2)	9th
2010	Nina Carberry (2)	Character Building	7th
2011	Nina Carberry (3)	Character Building (2)	15th
2012	Katie Walsh	Seabass	3rd
2012	Nina Carberry (4)	Organisedconfusion	Did not finish (unseated)
2013	Katie Walsh (2)	Seabass (2)	13th
2014	Katie Walsh (3)	Vesper Bell	13th
2015	Nina Carberry (5)	First Lieutenant	16th
2016	Nina Carberry (6)	Sir Des Champs	Did not finish (unseated)
2016	Katie Walsh (4)	Ballycasey	Did not finish (unseated)
2017	Katie Walsh (5)	Wonderful Charm	19th
2018	Bryony Frost	Milansbar	5th
2018	Katie Walsh (6)	Baie Des Iles	12th
2018	Rachael Blackmore	Alpha Des Obeaux	Did not finish (horse fell)
2019	Rachael Blackmore (2)	Valseur Lido	10th
2019	Lizzie Kelly	Tea For Two	Did not finish (pulled up)
2021	Rachael Blackmore (3)	Minella Times	1st
2021	Tabitha Worsley	Sub Lieutenant	14th
2021	Bryony Frost (2)	Yala Enki	Did not finish (fell)
2022	Rachael Blackmore (4)	Minella Times (2)	Did not finish (horse fell)
2023	Rachael Blackmore (5)	Ain't that a Shame	17th
2024	Rachael Blackmore (6)	Minella Indo	3rd
2024	Gina Andrews	Latenightpass	12th
2025	Rachael Blackmore (7)	Minella Indo (2)	9th
