= 2012 Cheltenham Gold Cup =

- Cheltenham Gold Cup
- Location: Cheltenham Racecourse
- Date: 16 March 2012
- Winning horse: Synchronised
- Starting price: 8/1
- Jockey: Tony McCoy
- Trainer: Jonjo O'Neill
- Owner: J. P. McManus
- Conditions: Good, good to soft in places

The 2012 Cheltenham Gold Cup (known as the Betfred Gold Cup for sponsorship reasons) was the 84th annual running of the Cheltenham Gold Cup horse race held at Cheltenham Racecourse on 16 March 2012.

Fourteen horses ran and the steeplechase was won by 8/1 shot Synchronised, who was trained by Jonjo O'Neill and ridden by Tony McCoy. Synchronised completed the course in a time of 6 minutes 36.19 seconds and won by a distance of 2¼ lengths from second-placed The Giant Bolster.

Kauto Star was attempting to win the Gold Cup for the third time and made a prominent start, but was weakened by a poor jump at the eighth fence and pulled-up by jockey Ruby Walsh before the tenth of the 22 fences.

The Gold Cup was sponsored by Betfred for the first time. Betfred had purchased The Tote, sponsors of the race since 1980, in June 2011.

== Details ==
- Sponsor: Betfred
- Winner's prize money: £284,750
- Going: Good, good to soft in places
- Number of runners: 14
- Winner's time: 6 mins 36.19 secs

== Full result ==
Fourteen ran in the race; the Irish-trained Quel Esprit made the card but did not run. Ten completed the course, three were pulled-up by their jockeys during the race, and one, What A Friend, fell at the second fence.

Position	Horse	Jockey	Trainer^{†}	SP	Distance/Fate	Prize money
1	Synchronised (IRE)	Tony McCoy	Jonjo O'Neill	8/1	Won by 2¼ lengths	£284,750
2	The Giant Bolster	Tom Scudamore	David Bridgwater	50/1	¾ length	£106,850
3	Long Run (FRA)	Mr. Sam Waley-Cohen	Nicky Henderson	7/4 fav	5 lengths	£53,500
4	Burton Port (IRE)	Barry Geraghty	Nicky Henderson	8/1	1½ lengths	£26,650
5	Time For Rupert (IRE)	Denis O'Regan	Paul Webber	33/1	10 lengths	£13,400
6	Knockara Beau (IRE)	Jan Faltejsek	George Charlton	66/1	11 lengths	£6,700
7	Midnight Chase	Dougie Costello	Neil Mulholland	12/1	17 lengths	
8	China Rock (IRE)	Andrew Lynch	Mouse Morris (IRE)	100/1	15 lengths	
9	The Midnight Club (IRE)	Paul Townend	Willie Mullins (IRE)	100/1	7 lengths	
10	Carruthers	Mattie Batchelor	Mark Bradstock	100/1	Last to complete	
DNF	Diamond Harry	Noel Fehily	Nick Williams	20/1	Pulled up, 18th fence	
DNF	Weird Al (IRE)	Jason Maguire	Donald McCain	8/1	Pulled up, 18th fence	
DNF	Kauto Star (FRA)	Ruby Walsh	Paul Nicholls	3/1	Pulled up, 10th fence	
DNF	What A Friend	Daryl Jacob	Paul Nicholls	25/1	Fell, 2nd fence	

- Amateur jockeys indicated by "Mr".

† Trainers are based in Great Britain unless indicated.

== Winner's details ==
Further details of the winner, Synchronised, ridden by jockey Tony McCoy:

- Foaled: 7 March 2003, in Ireland
- Sire: Sadler's Wells; Dam: Mayasta
- Trainer: Jonjo O'Neill
- Owner: J. P. McManus
- Breeder: Mrs. Noreen McManus

== See also ==
- Horseracing in Great Britain
- List of British National Hunt races
- 2012 Grand National
