= 2013 Grand National =

English steeplechase horse race

- Grand National
- Location: Aintree Racecourse
- Date: 6 April 2013
- Winning horse: (Republic of Ireland) Auroras Encore
- Starting price: 66/1
- Jockey: (Scotland) Ryan Mania
- Trainer: (England) Sue Smith
- Owner: Douglas Pryde, Jim Beaumont & David van der Hoeven
- Conditions: Good to soft

External videos
- Full replay of the 2013 Grand National Racing TV, YouTube

The 2013 Grand National (officially known as the John Smith's Grand National for sponsorship reasons) was the 166th annual running of the Grand National horse race at Aintree Racecourse near Liverpool, England. The showpiece steeplechase, which concluded a three-day meeting (one of only four held at Aintree throughout the year), took place on 6 April 2013. The maximum permitted field of 40 runners competed for a share of the £975,000 prize fund, which made the National the most valuable jump race in Europe.

The race was won by 66/1 shot Auroras Encore, who was ridden by jockey Ryan Mania for trainer Sue Smith. The 11/2 favourite Seabass, ridden by Katie Walsh, finished in 13th place. During the race only two horses fell and six unseated their riders; 17 completed the course and all 40 that ran returned safely to the stables.

The race was broadcast on Channel 4 for the first time as it took over the broadcasting rights for a four-year period to 2016. The BBC had broadcast the race every year since it was first televised in 1960 and first aired on radio in 1927. The BBC retain the UK radio coverage rights.

== Safety changes ==
In addition to modifications made for the previous year's race, Aintree announced that a number of further changes had been made for the 2013 National.

Twelve of the 16 fences on the course were rebuilt with the timber frames within them replaced by a softer material known as "plastic birch". The fences are still covered with at least 14 inches of spruce and will remain the same height. The starting line was also moved 90 yards closer to the first fence, further away from the spectators' stands and thereby reducing slightly the overall distance.

Aintree and the Professional Jockeys' Association jointly issued a note urging participating jockeys to avoid a false start by paying more attention to the starter's orders, and to better control their speed during the race.

In response to the further changes, David Muir of the RSPCA said: "They have done more than I thought they would. Fundamentally the changes that have been made are major already. They've taken the cores of the fences out, there is a cooling down area now, there's a water system and there's a reduction in the number of drop fences; [however] we'd still like to see changes to Becher's Brook, the drop is still a concern."

== Race card ==
External image
- The BBC's gallery of images from the 2013 Grand National

Entries for the race had to be submitted by 30 January 2013. Aintree announced that 84 horses had been entered for consideration in the 2013 Grand National, including last year's runner-up Sunnyhillboy, as well as Seabass and Cappa Bleu, third and fourth in the 2012 race respectively. Others hoping to return to the National for 2013 included Oscar Time, Big Fella Thanks, What A Friend, Cloudy Lane, Calgary Bay, and 2011 winner Ballabriggs.

Eight of the entrants were trained in Wales, including Cappa Bleu; the only Welsh-trained horse to have won the Grand National was Kirkland in 1905. Thirty-two of the 84 were trained in Ireland.

Handicap weights were announced by the British Horseracing Authority in London on 12 February. The top weight of 11 st 10 lb was allotted to Tidal Bay, trained by last year's winning trainer Paul Nicholls, however the horse was withdrawn two days later with a stress fracture of the lower cannon bone on his right hind leg. 2010 Cheltenham Gold Cup winner Imperial Commander now carries top weight. The National's official betting partner, Betfred, put Seabass (11 st 2 lb), On His Own (10 st 10 lb), and Prince De Beauchene (11 st 3 lb) as joint-favourites upon announcement of the handicaps. Prince De Beauchene was later withdrawn with a stress fracture.

There were scratchings' deadlines on 26 February and 19 March, after which 57 entries remained. 1 April marked the five-day confirmation stage at which 49 horses remained and were ranked according to their ratings. On 4 April the final field of 40 runners was declared:

No	Horse	Age	Handicap (st-lb)	SP	Jockey	Trainer	Owner(s)
1	Imperial Commander (IRE)	12	11–10		Sam Twiston-Davies	Nigel Twiston-Davies	Our Friends in the North
2	What A Friend	10	11-09		Sam Thomas	Paul Nicholls	G. Mason & A. Ferguson
3	Weird Al (IRE)	10	11-08		Timmy Murphy	Donald McCain	B. D. Holden
4	Quel Esprit (FRA)	9	11-07		Paul Townend	Willie Mullins (IRE)	Red Barn Syndicate
5	Big Fella Thanks	11	11-06		Denis O'Regan	Tom George	Crossed Fingers Partnership
6	Seabass (IRE)	10	11-06		Ms Katie Walsh	Ted Walsh (IRE)	Gunners Syndicate
7	Roberto Goldback (IRE)	11	11-06		Barry Geraghty	Nicky Henderson	S. Munir
8	Sunnyhillboy (IRE)	10	11-04		Richie McLernon	Jonjo O'Neill	J. P. McManus
9	Ballabriggs (IRE)	12	11-04		Jason Maguire	Donald McCain	T. Hemmings
10	Teaforthree (IRE)	9	11-03		Nick Scholfield	Rebecca Curtis	T437
11	Across the Bay (IRE)	9	11-02		Henry Brooke	Donald McCain	Scotch Piper Syndicate
12	Join Together (IRE)	8	11-02		Daryl Jacob	Paul Nicholls	I. Fogg & P. Barber
13	Colbert Station (IRE)	9	11-01		Tony McCoy	Ted Walsh (IRE)	J. P. McManus
14	Forpadydeplasterer (IRE)	11	11-00		Andrew J. McNamara	Thomas Cooper (IRE)	Goat Racing Syndicate
15	On His Own (IRE)	9	11-00		Ruby Walsh	Willie Mullins (IRE)	A. & G. Wylie
16	Joncol (IRE)	10	10–13		Robbie Power	Paul Nolan (IRE)	K. Browne
17	Balthazar King (IRE)	9	10–12		Richard Johnson	Philip Hobbs	The Brushmakers
18	Cappa Bleu (IRE)	11	10–11		Paul Moloney	Evan Williams	W. & A. Rucker
19	Oscar Time (IRE)	12	10–11		Mr Sam Waley-Cohen	Martin Lynch (IRE)	R. Waley-Cohen
20	Always Waining (IRE)	12	10–10		Tom O'Brien	Peter Bowen	P. & L. Douglas
21	Tatenen (FRA)	9	10–10		Andrew Thornton	Richard Rowe	Stewart family
22	Treacle (IRE)	12	10-09		Noel Fehily	Tom Taaffe (IRE)	B. Nielsen
23	Lost Glory (NZL)	8	10-08		Mark Walsh	Jonjo O'Neill	J. P. McManus
24	Swing Bill (FRA)	12	10-08		Conor O'Farrell	David Pipe	D. Johnson
25	Saint Are (FRA)	7	10-08		Dougie Costello	Tim Vaughan	D. Fox
26	Chicago Grey (IRE)	10	10-07		Paul Carberry	Gordon Elliott (IRE)	J. Earls
27	Quiscover Fontaine (FRA)	9	10-07		David Casey	Willie Mullins (IRE)	J. P. McManus
28	Rare Bob (IRE)	11	10-06		Bryan Cooper	Dessie Hughes (IRE)	D A Syndicate
29	The Rainbow Hunter	9	10-06		Aidan Coleman	Kim Bailey	May We Never Be Found Out
30	Becauseicouldntsee (IRE)	10	10-06		Martin Ferris	Noel Glynn (IRE)	N. Glynn
31	Harry the Viking	8	10–06		Ryan Mahon	Paul Nicholls	A. Ferguson, G. Mason, R. Wood & P. Done
32	Mr. Moonshine (IRE)	9	10-05		Peter Buchanan	Sue Smith	A. Strang-Steel, D. Pryde & J. Beaumont
33	Mumbles Head (IRE)	12	10-04		Jamie Moore	Peter Bowen	P. Thompson
34	Ninetieth Minute (IRE)	10	10-03		Niall Madden	Tom Taaffe (IRE)	D. Cox
35	Auroras Encore (IRE)	11	10-03		Ryan Mania	Sue Smith	D. Pryde, J. Beaumont & D. P. van der Hoeven
36	Tarquinius (FRA)	10	10-02		Wilson Renwick	Gordon Elliott (IRE)	R. Gilbert
37	Any Currency (IRE)	10	10-00		Ian Popham	Martin Keighley	Cash Is King
38	Major Malarkey (IRE)	10	09-13		Tom Scudamore	Nigel Twiston-Davies	Baker, Dodd & Cooke
39	Soll	8	09-12		Mark Grant	Jo Hughes	D. Mossop
40	Viking Blond (FRA)	8	09-11		Adam Wedge	Nigel Twiston-Davies	C. Mould

- Great Britain unless stated.
- Amateur jockeys denoted by preceding title, e.g. Mr.

== Race overview ==
The starter Hugh Barclay got the field of 40 horses off and running at the first attempt, the start line having been moved 90 yards closer to the first fence and further away from the spectators' stands. Seabass was sent off as 11/2 favourite, with jockey Katie Walsh becoming the first female rider to start a Grand National as favourite. Her brother Ruby Walsh was second-favourite on board On His Own.

For the first time in history, all 40 runners made it to the Canal Turn – the eighth of the 30 fences – without mishap. Across the Bay led over the Turn from Balthazar King, while three riders were unseated. Andrew Thornton became the first of only two jockeys in the 2013 National to fall from his mount as the field streamed over the 12th fence.

The Chair is the penultimate fence on the first circuit and marked the end of the race for champion jockey Tony McCoy who was unseated from Colbert Station. Thirty-two of the 40 participants were still in contention going onto the second circuit, led by Across the Bay from Balthazar King, Oscar Time, and Teaforthree.

All the remaining runners safely jumped the second Becher's Brook, the first time since 1996 that the famous fence had not claimed any fallers. Ruby Walsh fell at Valentine's (the 25th fence) after which several runners had been pulled up, leaving 21 still racing. Irish-trained Oscar Time and Welsh-trained Teaforthree led the field, with Auroras Encore emerging in third position. At the final fence, Paul Carberry pulled up Chicago Grey while Mumbles Head refused and two other horses unseated their riders.

At the elbow on the 494-yard run-in, Auroras Encore had extended his lead over Teaforthree and Oscar Time, the latter fading and quickly overtaken by Cappa Bleu. At the line, the pairing of Auroras Encore and Ryan Mania – taking his first ride in the Grand National – won by a distance of nine lengths, Cappa Bleu pipped Teaforthree for second place, Oscar Time finished in fourth and Rare Bob was fifth. Seventeen runners completed the course.

== Finishing order ==
Position	Horse	Jockey	SP	Distance	Prize money
1	Auroras Encore (IRE)	Ryan Mania	66/1	Won by 9 lengths	£547,268
2	Cappa Bleu (IRE)	Paul Moloney	12/1	Neck	£205,823
3	Teaforthree (IRE)	Nick Scholfield	10/1	11 lengths	£102,863
4	Oscar Time (IRE)	Mr Sam Waley-Cohen	66/1	8 lengths	£51,383
5	Rare Bob (IRE)	Bryan Cooper	16/1	6 lengths	£25,838
6	Swing Bill (FRA)	Conor O'Farrell	80/1	10 lengths	£12,870
7	Soll	Mark Grant	33/1	3 lengths	£6,630
8	Tarquinius (FRA)	Wilson Renwick	100/1	1 1/2 lengths	£3,510
9	Saint Are (FRA)	Dougie Costello	50/1	12 lengths	£1,950
10	Always Waining (IRE)	Tom O'Brien	33/1	1 1/2 lengths	£975
11	Major Malarkey (IRE)	Tom Scudamore	50/1	1 1/2 lengths	
12	Join Together (IRE)	Daryl Jacob	25/1	22 lengths	
13	Seabass (IRE)	Ms Katie Walsh	11/2 F	1 1/4 lengths	
14	Across the Bay (IRE)	Henry Brooke	40/1	3 1/2 lengths	
15	Balthazar King (IRE)	Richard Johnson	16/1	1 length	
16	Quiscover Fontaine (FRA)	David Casey	40/1	44 lengths	
17	Any Currency (IRE)	Ian Popham	100/1	Last to complete	

== Non-finishers ==
Fence	Horse	Jockey	SP	Fate
8 (Canal Turn)	The Rainbow Hunter	Aidan Coleman	50/1	Unseated rider
8 (Canal Turn)	Treacle (IRE)	Noel Fehily	33/1	Unseated rider
8 (Canal Turn)	Big Fella Thanks	Denis O'Regan	33/1	Unseated rider
11	Ninetieth Minute (IRE)	Niall Madden	80/1	Pulled up
12	Tatenen (FRA)	Andrew Thornton	100/1	Fell
14	Viking Blond (FRA)	Adam Wedge	66/1	Pulled up
15 (The Chair)	Colbert Station (IRE)	Tony McCoy	12/1	Unseated rider
17	Lost Glory (NZL)	Mark Walsh	50/1	Pulled up
19 (open ditch)	Joncol (IRE)	Robbie Power	50/1	Pulled up
19 (open ditch)	What A Friend	Sam Thomas	33/1	Pulled up
21	Becauseicouldntsee (IRE)	Martin Ferris	66/1	Pulled up
22 (Becher's Brook)	Imperial Commander (IRE)	Sam Twiston-Davies	11/1	Pulled up
23 (Foinavon)	Forpadydeplasterer (IRE)	Andrew McNamara	66/1	Pulled up
23 (Foinavon)	Quel Esprit (FRA)	Paul Townend	40/1	Pulled up
23 (Foinavon)	Weird Al (IRE)	Timmy Murphy	66/1	Pulled up
24 (Canal Turn)	Ballabriggs (IRE)	Jason Maguire	20/1	Pulled up
25 (Valentine's)	On His Own (IRE)	Ruby Walsh	8/1	Fell
25 (Valentine's)	Harry the Viking	Ryan Mahon	40/1	Pulled up
27 (open ditch)	Mr. Moonshine (IRE)	Peter Buchanan	66/1	Pulled up
30	Mumbles Head (IRE)	Jamie Moore	100/1	Refused
30	Sunnyhillboy (IRE)	Richie McLernon	20/1	Unseated rider
30	Roberto Goldback (IRE)	Barry Geraghty	25/1	Unseated rider
30	Chicago Grey (IRE)	Paul Carberry	11/1	Pulled up

== Colours ==
John Smith's Grand National Chase (Grade 3 Handicap) 2013

Auroras Encore
1st @ 66/1

Cappa Bleu
2nd @ 12/1

Teaforthree
3rd @ 10/1

Oscar Time
4th @ 66/1

Rare Bob
5th @ 16/1

Swing Bill
6th @ 80/1

Soll
7th @ 33/1

Tarquinius
8th @ 100/1

Saint Are
9th @ 50/1

Always Waining
10th @ 33/1

Major Malarkey
11th @ 50/1

Join Together
12th @ 25/1

Seabass
13th @ 11/2 F

Across The Bay
14th @ 40/1

Balthazar King
15th @ 16/1

Quiscover Fontaine
16th @ 40/1

Any Currency
17th @ 100/1

Mumbles Head
Refused @ 100/1

Treacle
Unseated Rider @ 33/1

Imperial Commander
Pulled Up @ 11/1

Ballabriggs
Pulled Up @ 20/1

What A Friend
Pulled Up @ 33/1

Ninetieth Minute
Pulled Up @ 80/1

Tatenen
Fell @ 100/1

Big Fella Thanks
Unseated Rider @ 33/1

Becauseicouldntsee
Pulled Up @ 66/1

Sunnyhillboy
Unseated Rider @ 20/1

Forpadydeplasterer
Pulled Up @ 66/1

Weird Al
Pulled Up @ 66/1

Chicago Grey
Pulled Up @ 11/1

Joncol
Pulled Up @ 50/1

The Rainbow Hunter
Unseated Rider @ 50/1

Mr Moonshine
Pulled Up @ 66/1

Roberto Goldback
Unseated Rider @ 25/1

Colbert Station
Unseated Rider @ 12/1

Quel Esprit
Pulled Up @ 40/1

Viking Blond
Pulled Up @ 66/1

On His Own
Fell @ 8/1

Lost Glory
Pulled Up @ 50/1

Harry The Viking
Pulled Up @ 40/1

== Reaction ==
Sue Smith became only the third woman to train a Grand National winner, after Jenny Pitman (1983 and 1995) and Venetia Williams (2009). Smith said afterward: "I knew the ground was right for him and hoped everything else was. He stayed down the middle and had a bit of luck in running. He didn't have a lot of weight and that helped, too."

Auroras Encore was jockey Ryan Mania's first ride in the National. He said after his victory: "There are no words to describe it. I got a dream ride round. I couldn't believe my luck." Mania added that he could not "go too mad" with his celebrations as he was due to race at Hexham the next day. He did race the following afternoon, but was injured in a fall during the St. John Lee Handicap Hurdle and had to be airlifted to Newcastle Royal Infirmary where he was described as being in a "stable" condition. He was released from hospital two days later with minor neck and back injuries, saying he was "feeling a bit tired and a bit sore but apart from that I'm OK, it's nothing serious."

With two equine fatalities in each of the two previous Nationals, much of the media commentary after the 2013 race hailed the fact that all 40 runners had returned safely to the stables and that only two had fallen at the modified fences. The RSPCA's chief executive Gavin Grant said that his organisation was "delighted that the changes seem to have contributed to a safe yet competitive race." Roly Owers of World Horse Welfare added: "Aintree can take considerable credit for the improvements they have made to the course. It is too early to say with certainty whether the softer fences are making a difference, but ... the initial signs are encouraging."

Channel 4 enjoyed a 61% share of the UK terrestrial television audience at its peak during the race. Though its peak viewing figures were down by 2 million from the 2012 race which was broadcast on the BBC and watched by nearly 11 million in the UK, they were slightly above those registered by the BBC in 2011 and 2009 and more than 1 million above those achieved in 2010.

== Broadcasting ==
Auroras Encore has taken over and leads the National field up the run-in. They head to the elbow, Auroras Encore from Teaforthree, then Oscar Time back in third place, followed by Cappa Bleu and Swing Bill. Inside the final furlong, Auroras Encore and Ryan Mania out in front here and has drawn eight lengths clear of the tiring Teaforthree, Cappa Bleu running on, but it will go to the Sue Smith team! Auroras Encore and Ryan Mania win the John Smith's Grand National!

— Channel 4 lead commentator Simon Holt describes the climax of the race.

As the Grand National is accorded the status of an event of national interest in the United Kingdom and is listed on the Ofcom Code on Sports and Other Listed and Designated Events, it must be shown on free-to-air terrestrial television in the UK. Channel 4 took over the broadcasting rights from the BBC for a four-year period from 2013.

Clare Balding and Nick Luck presented Channel 4's coverage, supported by Jim McGrath, Mick Fitzgerald and Graham Cunningham. Reports were provided by Rishi Persad and Alice Plunkett and betting updates by Tanya Stevenson and Brian Gleeson. Balding, Fitzgerald and Persad were previously regulars of BBC's coverage team for the race in recent years. The commentary team was composed of Richard Hoiles, Ian Bartlett (also previously part of the BBC's team) and Simon Holt. As lead commentator for Channel 4, Holt called the winner home for the first time. After the race, Nick Luck, Mick Fitzgerald and Richard Hoiles provided the viewers with a detailed re-run of the race.

Whereas the BBC lost the television rights for the race, its radio station 5 Live broadcast the race as before, the 81st consecutive running of the National to be covered live on BBC radio.

== See also ==
- Horseracing in Great Britain
- List of British National Hunt races
