= Thunder and Roses =

Thunder and Roses may refer to:

- Thunder & Roses, an album by Pam Tillis
- Thunder and Roses, a rock power trio from Philadelphia.
- Thunder And Roses, a racehorse
- "Thunder and Roses", a 1947 story by Theodore Sturgeon
- Thunder and Roses, a 1993 novel by Mary Jo Putney
