= 2021 Grand National =

173rd Grand National horse race

- Grand National
- Location: Aintree
- Date: 10 April 2021
- Winning horse: (Republic of Ireland) Minella Times
- Starting price: 11/1
- Jockey: (Republic of Ireland) Rachael Blackmore
- Trainer: (Republic of Ireland) Henry de Bromhead
- Owner: (Republic of Ireland) J. P. McManus
- Conditions: Good to soft

External videos
- Full replay of the 2021 Grand National Racing TV, YouTube

The 2021 Grand National (officially known as the Randox 2021 Grand National for sponsorship reasons) was the 173rd annual running of the Grand National horse race, held at Aintree Racecourse in Liverpool, England, on 10 April 2021. The event was once again sponsored by Randox Health, although the name on the race from this year onwards was shortened to simply "Randox". The total prize fund for the race was £750,000, down by £250,000 from the last meeting in 2019.

The race was won by Minella Times, trained by Henry de Bromhead and ridden by Rachael Blackmore, who became the first female jockey to win the Grand National. De Bromhead, who won the race as a trainer for the first time, also trained the second-place finisher Balko des Flos. The winner was owned by J. P. McManus, who had previously won the race as an owner in 2010 with Don't Push It. The Long Mile was euthanised after fracturing a hind leg. Jockey Bryony Frost was treated for injuries after falling from Yala Enki.

Having been cancelled the year before due to the COVID-19 pandemic, the 2021 race and entire festival meeting took place behind closed doors for the first time in its history, because of continuing restrictions. Despite speculations and calls from some leading figures in racing for the meeting to be pushed back in the calendar so that it could possibly take place when betting shops are open, it was confirmed the race would retain its original date.

The death of Prince Philip, Duke of Edinburgh was announced shortly before the second day of the meeting. The meeting continued as scheduled, with tributes including a two-minute silence before racing, jockeys wearing black armbands on their silks as a mark of respect and the Union Jack on the Queen Mother Stand being lowered to half-mast.

== Race card ==
On 3 February 106 entries were announced. The early favourite in ante-post betting was the 2018 and 2019 winner Tiger Roll, but he was withdrawn before the first scratching stage by the Gigginstown House Stud, citing excessive weight allocation. Cloth Cap was left as the favourite.

No	Horse	Age	Handicap (st–lb)	SP	Jockey	Trainer
1	Bristol De Mai	10	11–10	33/1	Daryl Jacob	Nigel Twiston-Davies
2	Chris's Dream	9	11–7	80/1	D.J. O'Keeffe	Henry de Bromhead
3	Yala Enki	11	11–3	50/1	Bryony Frost	Paul Nicholls
4	Ballyoptic	11	11–1	125/1	Sam Twiston-Davies	Nigel Twiston-Davies
5	Definitly Red	12	11–1	66/1	Ryan Mania	Brian Ellison
6	Lake View Lad	11	11–0	66/1	Brian Hughes	N. W. Alexander
7	Burrows Saint	8	10–13	9/1	Mr. Patrick Mullins	Willie Mullins
8	Magic Of Light	10	10–13	16/1	Robbie Power	Jessica Harrington
9	Acapella Bourgeois	11	10–12	25/1	Danny Mullins	Willie Mullins
10	Talkischeap	9	10–12	50/1	Tom Cannon	Alan King
11	Tout Est Permis	8	10–12	150/1	Sean Flanagan	Noel Meade
12	Anibale Fly	11	10–12	28/1	Denis O'Regan	Tony Martin
13	Mister Malarky	8	10–12	14/1	Jonjo O'Neill Jnr	Colin Tizzard
14	Kimberlite Candy	9	10–10	22/1	Richie McLernon	Tom Lacey
15	Any Second Now	9	10–9	15/2	Mark Walsh	Ted Walsh
16	Balko Des Flos	10	10–9	150/1	Aidan Coleman	Henry de Bromhead
17	Alpha Des Obeaux	11	10–9	80/1	Jody McGarvey	Denise Foster
18	Ok Corral	11	10–8	80/1	Mr. Derek O'Connor	Nicky Henderson
19	Takingrisks	12	10–7	20/1	Sean Quinlan	Nicky Richards
20	Shattered Love	10	10–7	40/1	Kevin Sexton	Denise Foster
21	Jett	10	10–7	125/1	Mr. Sam Waley-Cohen	Jessica Harrington
22	Lord Du Mesnil	8	10–6	66/1	Nick Scholfield	Richard Hobson
23	Potters Corner	11	10–6	28/1	Jack Tudor	Christian Williams
24	Class Conti	9	10–6	80/1	Brian Hayes	Willie Mullins
25	Milan Native	8	10–6	40/1	Mr. Jamie Codd	Denise Foster
26	Discorama	8	10–6	16/1	Bryan Cooper	Paul Nolan
27	Vieux Lion Rouge	12	10–5	80/1	Conor O'Farrell	David Pipe
28	Cloth Cap	9	10–5	11/2 F	Tom Scudamore	Jonjo O’Neill
29	Cabaret Queen	9	10–5	150/1	S.F. O'Keeffe	Willie Mullins
30	Minellacelebration	11	10–5	80/1	Ben Poste	Katy Price
31	Canelo	8	10–4	66/1	Tom Bellamy	Alan King
32	The Long Mile	7	10–4	50/1	L.P. Dempsey	J.P. Dempsey
33	Give Me A Copper	11	10–4	50/1	Sean Bowen	Paul Nicholls
34	Farclas	7	10–3	16/1	Jack Kennedy	Denise Foster
35	Minella Times	8	10–3	11/1	Rachael Blackmore	Henry de Bromhead
36	Sub Lieutenant	12	10–3	80/1	Tabitha Worsley	Georgie Howell
37	Hogan's Height	10	10–3	150/1	Gavin Sheehan	Jamie Snowden
38	Double Shuffle	11	10–2	125/1	Jonathan Burke	Tom George
39	Ami Desbois	11	10–2	150/1	Kielon Woods	Graeme McPherson
40	Blaklion	12	10–2	50/1	Harry Skelton	Dan Skelton
R1	Some Neck	10	–	–	–	John McConnell
R2	Secret Reprieve	7	–	–	–	Evan Williams
R3	Kauto Riko	10	–	–	–	Tom Gretton
R4	Fagan	11	–	–	–	Alex Hales

Sources: Trainers and weights Jockeys Starting prices

- Note Mr/Mrs/Miss/Ms in the jockeys name denotes an amateur.

== Race overview ==
The race was held without spectators due to COVID-19. The favourite, Cloth Cap, was the first leader in the race, but was quickly caught by Jett, who then built up a large lead, with Cloth Cap remaining in second for much of the race. Any Second Now ran into trouble when Double Shuffle fell in front of him in the first half of the race, costing him several lengths. Cloth Cap was pulled up four fences from the end. On the third-last fence Any Second Now nearly fell. On the second-last fence, a pack of chasing horses, including Minella Times, Any Second Now, Discorama, Burrows Saint and Balko Des Flos caught Jett, as Jett faded. Minella Times took the lead on the second-last fence, and maintained it to the finish, while dark horse Balko Des Flos won second-place on the last fence.

The Long Mile suffered an injury while running on a flat portion of the race and was euthanised after the race. Bryony Frost fell from Yala Enki and needed hospital treatment.

Henry de Bromhead trained the top two finishers in the race, only a few weeks after his horses won the top three races at the Cheltenham Festival. Jockey Rachael Blackmore recorded the best ever finish for a woman jockey, above the third place finish for Katie Walsh in 2012. In her interview after the race, Blackmore stated "I don't feel male or female. I don't even feel human, I feel unbelievable."

== Finishing order ==
Placed horses

1: Minella Times

2: Balko Des Flos

3: Any Second Now

4: Burrows Saint

Position	Name	Age	Handicap (st–lb)	SP	Jockey	Trainer	Prize money
1	Minella Times	8	10–3	11/1	Rachael Blackmore	Henry de Bromhead	£375,000
2	Balko Des Flos	10	10–9	100/1	Aidan Coleman	Henry de Bromhead	£150,000
3	Any Second Now	9	10–9	15/2	Mark Walsh	Ted Walsh	£75,000
4	Burrows Saint	8	10–13	9/1	Patrick Mullins	Willie Mullins	£48,750
5	Farclas	7	10–3	16/1	Jack Kennedy	Mrs Denise Foster	£30,000
6	Blaklion	12	10–2	50/1	Harry Skelton	Dan Skelton	£22,500
7	Discorama	8	10–6	16/1	Bryan Cooper	Paul Nolan	£15,000
8	Jett	10	10–7	80/1	Sam Waley-Cohen	Jessica Harrington	£11,250
9	Cabaret Queen	9	10–5	80/1	Sean O'Keeffe	Willie Mullins	£7,500
10	Shattered Love	10	10–7	33/1	Kevin Sexton	Mrs Denise Foster	£3,750
11	Alpha Des Obeaux	11	10–9	80/1	Jody McGarvey	Mrs Denise Foster	
12	Hogan's Height	10	10–3	100/1	Gavin Sheehan	Jamie Snowden	
13	Acapella Bourgeois	11	10–12	20/1	Danny Mullins	Willie Mullins	
14	Sub Lieutenant	12	10–3	50/1	Tabitha Worsley	Georgia Howell	
15	Class Conti	9	10–6	66/1	Brian Hayes	Willie Mullins	

== Non-finishers ==
Fence	Name	Jockey	SP	Fate
1	Lake View Lad	Brian Hughes	50/1	Fell
4	Magic Of Light	Robbie Power	14/1	Unseated rider
11	Minellacelebration	Benjamin Poste	80/1	Unseated rider
12	Double Shuffle	Jonathan Burke	66/1	Fell
13	Anibale Fly	Denis O'Regan	28/1	Pulled up
15	Canelo	Thomas Bellamy	66/1	Fell
15	Ami Desbois	Kielan Woods	100/1	Brought down
17	Takingrisks	Sean Quinlan	14/1	Pulled up
17	Mister Malarky	Jonjo O'Neill Jr.	12/1	Pulled up
20	Yala Enki	Bryony Frost	40/1	Unseated rider
20	Vieux Lion Rouge	Conor O'Farrell	66/1	Fell
21	Ballyoptic	Sam Twiston-Davies	66/1	Refused
21	Ok Corral	Mr Derek O'Connor	80/1	Pulled up
21	Lord Du Mesnil	Nick Scholfield	50/1	Pulled up
22	Bristol De Mai	Daryl Jacob	25/1	Pulled up
22	Potters Corner	Jack Tudor	22/1	Pulled up
23	The Long Mile	L P Dempsey	50/1	Pulled up
26	Talkischeap	Tom Cannon	33/1	Pulled up
27	Chris's Dream	D J O'Keeffe	40/1	Unseated rider
28	Cloth Cap	Tom Scudamore	11/2 Fav	Pulled up
29	Give Me A Copper	Sean Bowen	33/1	Pulled up
29	Definitly Red	Ryan Mania	28/1	Pulled up
29	Tout Est Permis	Sean Flanagan	100/1	Pulled up
29	Kimberlite Candy	Richie McLernon	20/1	Pulled up
29	Milan Native	Mr Jamie Codd	50/1	Pulled up

== Broadcasting and media ==
"It is Minella Times who leads them towards the elbow, three or four lengths clear from ridden in second place Balko Des Flos, Any Second Now and Burrows Saint. Rachael Blackmore heads towards the elbow, with 200 yards between herself and an Aintree victory. Balko Des Flos and Any Second Now are about five lengths down. 150 yards to go! Minella Times, Rachael Blackmore, still five lengths clear! And it is Minella Times who is keeping up the gallop towards the line! Minella Times, Rachael Blackmore raise the bar, still higher! She won the National on Minella Times for Henry De Bromhead!"

— ITV lead commentator Richard Hoiles describes the climax of the race.

As the Grand National is accorded the status of an event of national interest in the United Kingdom and is listed on the Ofcom Code on Sports and Other Listed and Designated Events, it must be shown on free-to-air terrestrial television in the UK. The race was broadcast live on TV by ITV for the fourth time, and the first year in its new three year deal with the British Horseracing Authority. For Racing TV, the race was called by Stewart Machin, Alan Howes and Simon Holt.

The ITV coverage was presented by Ed Chamberlin and Francesca Cumani. Analysis was provided by former Grand National-winning jockeys Sir Anthony McCoy and Mick Fitzgerald, with Ruby Walsh also contributing via remote link from the course. Reports were provided by Alice Plunkett, Rishi Persad, Luke Harvey and Matt Chapman – who also provided updates on betting during the broadcast. Oli Bell and Chris Hughes covered viewers' comments on social media. The commentary team was Mark Johnson, Ian Bartlett and Richard Hoiles, who called the finish for the fourth time. Following the race, Bell, Fitzgerald and Walsh guided viewers on a fence-by-fence re-run of the race.

Because of the death of Prince Philip, Duke of Edinburgh on 9 April, coverage of the second day of the meeting was moved to ITV4, with no advertisement breaks or sponsorship bumpers.

In the Republic of Ireland, the race was broadcast on Virgin Media One.

== See also ==
- Horse racing in Great Britain
- List of British National Hunt races
