= Harvey Smith (equestrian) =

British show jumping champion

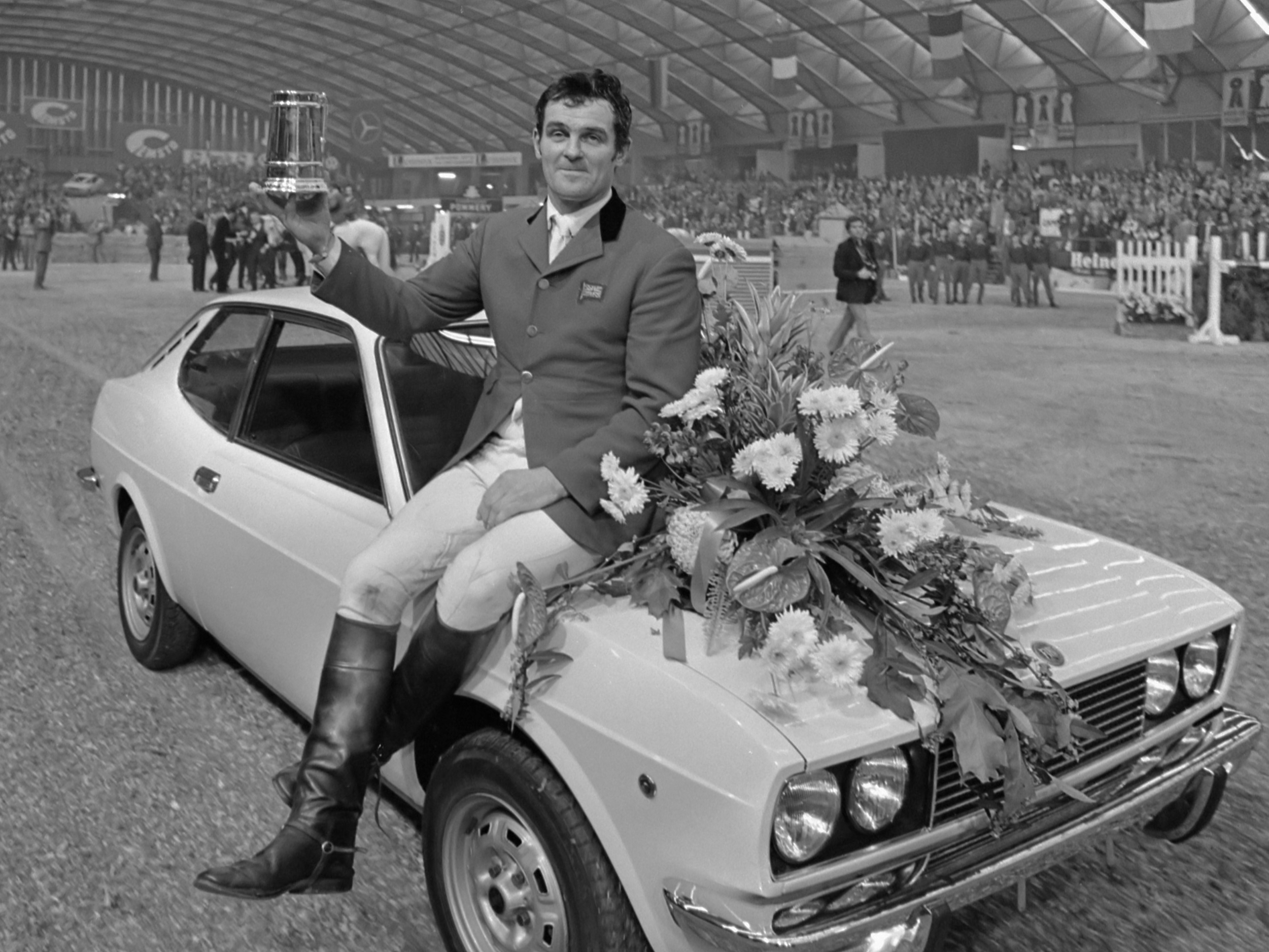
- Harvey Smith (1974)

Personal information
- Born: 29 December 1938 (age 87) Gilstead, West Riding of Yorkshire, England
- Home town: Bingley, England

Sport
- Sport: Equestrianism
- Event: Show jumping
Medal record
Representing Great Britain
Equestrian
World Championships
Bronze medal – third place	1970 La Baule	Individual show jumping
European Championships
Bronze medal – third place	1963 Rome	Individual show jumping
Silver medal – second place	1967 Rotterdam	Individual show jumping
Silver medal – second place	1971 Aachen	Individual show jumping
Silver medal – second place	1977 Vienna	Team show jumping
Silver medal – second place	1983 Hickstead	Team show jumping

Harvey John Smith (born 29 December 1938) is a retired British show jumping champion. He stood out from the ranks of showjumpers because of his broad accent and blunt manner. His career was often controversial: in 1971 he was disciplined (overturned on appeal) after he gave a "V sign" to the judges following a near-perfect round which won him the British Show Jumping Derby for the second year in succession; this act also earned him a 'tongue-in-cheek' part in an advertisement for Victory V sweets with the slogan 'They've got a kick like a mule!' The expression "Doing a Harvey Smith" entered the English language for giving a V sign.

== Early life ==
Harvey John Smith was born on 29 December 1938 in Gilstead, England, to Walter and Ethel Smith who wanted him to "continue the family tradition and work in the construction industry with his older brother John". He rode his first pony at seven, and competed in his first show in 1947 at 8 years old on a local farmer's milk pony. He was not fond of school and preferred to spend his time outdoors with animals, and bought his first jumping horse Farmer's Boy in 1954.

== Show jumping career ==
External videos
- Harvey Smith riding Graf in a puissance competition at HOYS 1977

Smith competed in two Olympics. At the 1968 Olympics in Mexico City, he rode Madison Time to 11th place in the Individual jumping and 8th place for Great Britain in the Team jumping. He rode Summertime to 4th place for Great Britain in the Team jumping competition at the 1972 Olympics in Munich, Germany. .

Harvey will always be remembered for the immense contribution he made to the sport, not only as the ultimate showman, but as an Olympian who represented his country with fierce patriotism and whose desire never to be beaten drove him to win more than 50 grands prix, four Hickstead Derby titles, six championship medals and a swathe of prestigious trophies. —Jennifer Donald, Horse & Hound 2020

Smith won the John Player Trophy, the grand prix of Great Britain, seven times.

In 1989 Smith was honoured for being the first man to have jumped in 100 Volvo World Cup Qualifying Rounds.

He retired from show jumping competition in 1990.

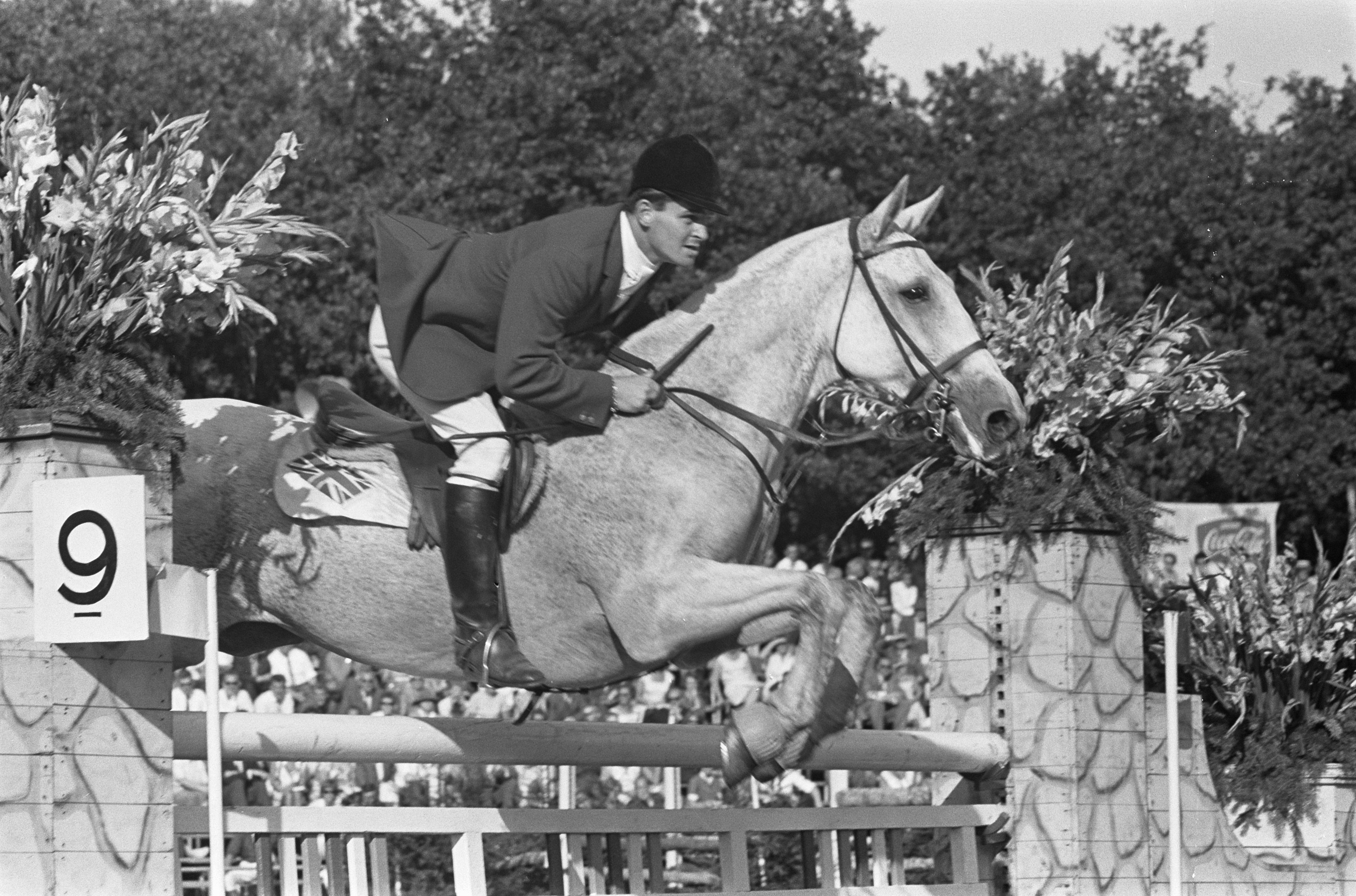
War Paint, 1962

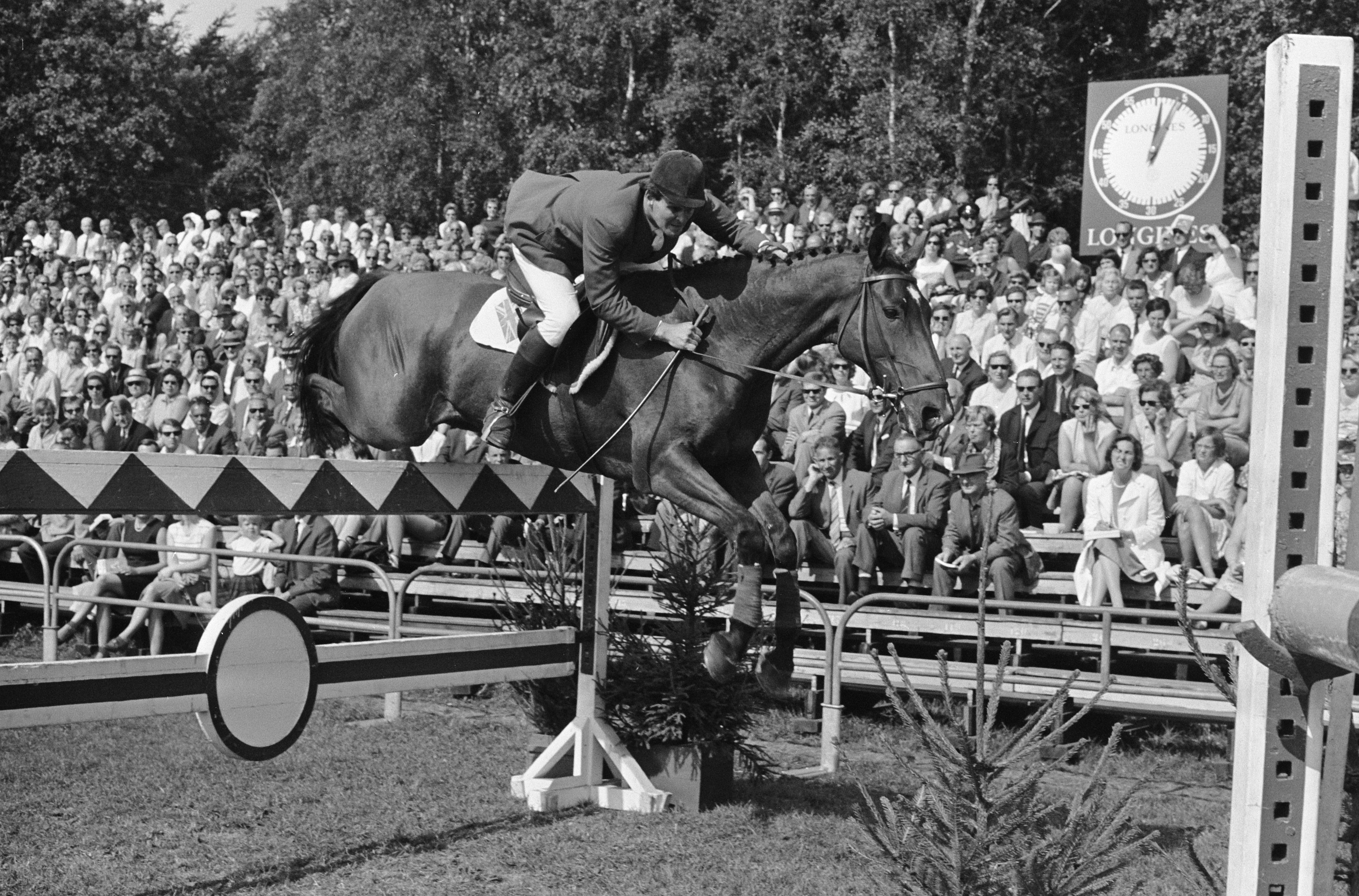
Harvester, 1967

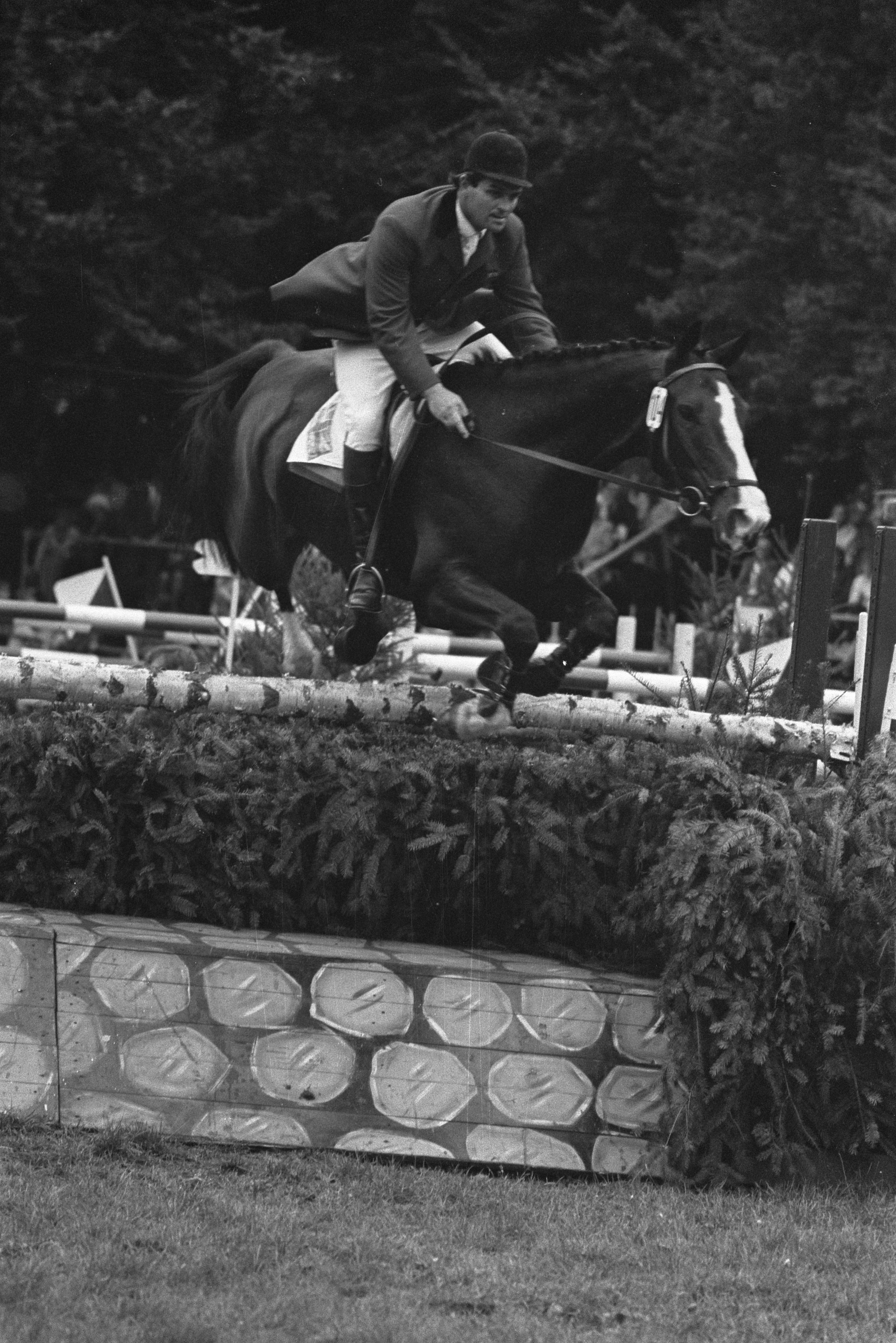
Evan Jones, 1971

== Other activities ==
Smith became so famous that he embarked on a brief, but unsuccessful, singing career. In 1975 he released a record with picture sleeve called True Love/End of the World on Handkerchief HANKY 3.

He later became a television commentator for the British Broadcasting Corporation, doing equestrian coverage at the 1984 Summer Olympics in Los Angeles.

During the 1970s in his spare time he competed in professional wrestling.

In 1990, after retiring from show jumping competition, Harvey joined with wife and trainer Sue Smith, a former showjumper herself, to form a racing team at their Yorkshire base, Craiglands Farm. Their charge Auroras Encore won the 2013 Grand National.

== Bibliography ==
- Smith, Harvey (1972). V is for victory. London: Kimber. ISBN 978-0-7183-0372-3. OL 5451861M.
- Smith, Harvey (1976). Harvey. London: Arrow Books. ISBN 978-0-09-913700-9.
- Smith, Harvey (1979). Show jumping with Harvey Smith. London: Stanley Paul & Co. ISBN 0091368405. OL 4479426M.
- Smith, Harvey; Green, Victor (1984). Harvey Smith on Show-Jumping. Michael Joseph. ISBN 0720714737.
- Smith, Harvey (1985). Bedside Jumping. Collins. ISBN 978-0-00-218182-2. OL 9907843M.

== Personal life ==
Harvey Smith is married to Sue Smith and they reside at Craiglands Farm. He has two sons Robert and Steven, with his previous wife, Irene, who have also become equestrian champions.
