= Sue Smith (trainer) =

British horse trainer (born 1948)

Personal information
- Full name: Sue Maslen
- Born: 23 February 1948 (age 78) West Sussex, United Kingdom
- Occupation: Horse Trainer
- Spouse: Harvey Smith

Horse racing career
- Sport: Horse racing

Major racing wins
- Grand National (2013)

Significant horses
- Kildimo, The Last Fling, Royal Emperor, Artic Jack, Ardent Scout, Auroras Encore

Sue Smith (born Sue Maslen on 23 February 1948) is a British horse trainer.

== Background ==
Smith was originally from West Sussex. Her father owned racehorses at the time and she would ride them out at Epsom. She had the distinction of participating in Britain's initial ladies' race. In her youth, she was an international show jumper.

== Training ==
Smith trains at Craiglands Farm near Bingley Moor, in West Yorkshire. The farm consists of 150 acres and facilities for 55 horses. Her first winner came in 1990 when African Safari won a three-runner chase at Ascot. He had been purchased at the Ascot Sales for 4,300 guineas. She received her full licence in 1990.

=== Grand National ===
In 2013 Smith trained Auroras Encore to win the Grand National. Ridden by Scottish Jockey Ryan Mania, Auroras Encore won by nine lengths, to Cappa Bleu in second and Teaforthree in third. He was an outsider winning at the odds of 66–1. She became the third female trainer to win the race.

== Personal life ==
She is married to Harvey Smith, a retired show jumper.
