= Auroras Encore =

Irish-bred Thoroughbred racehorse (2002–2026)

- Sire: Second Empire
- Grandsire: Fairy King
- Dam: Sama Veda
- Damsire: Rainbow Quest
- Sex: Gelding
- Foaled: 10 March 2002
- Died: May 2026 (aged 24)
- Country: Ireland
- Colour: Bay
- Breeder: Mountarmstrong Stud
- Owner: Douglas Pryde, Jim Beaumont & David van der Hoeven
- Trainer: Sue Smith
- Record: 47: 8-7-1

Major wins
- Grand National (2013)

Auroras Encore (10 March 2002 – May 2026) was an Irish-bred, British-trained Thoroughbred racehorse best known for winning the 2013 Grand National. In a racing career which lasted from February 2007 until January 2014 he won two hurdle races and six steeplechases from forty-seven starts.

== Background ==
Auroras Encore was a bay gelding bred in Ireland by the Mountarmstrong Stud. His sire Second Empire won the Grand Critérium in 1997 and started second favourite for the following year's Epsom Derby. The best of his offspring to date has probably been the Victor Chandler Chase winner Somersby.

Auroras Encore was offered for sale at the Tattersalls Ireland sale in September 2003 where he was bought for €7,000 by Frank Barry. Two years later the gelding was auctioned at Doncaster and was sold for 9,500 guineas to Harvey Smith the husband of the trainer Sue Smith. Auroras Encore then entered the ownership of Alicia Skene and was sent into training with Sue Smith at High Eldwick, near Baildon in West Yorkshire.

Auroras Encore died in May 2026, at the age of 24.

== Racing career ==
Auroras Encore began his racing career in early 2007 when he finished second in National Hunt flat races at Market Rasen and Sedgefield. In the 2007/2008 National Hunt season he ran ten times, recording his first victory in a Novice Hurdle at Sedgefield in December. In April 2008 he recorded his first major victory when winning a handicap hurdle at the Grand National meeting at Aintree Racecourse.

Auroras Encore was campaigned in steeplechases in the following season and won three of his nine races. He won novice steeplechases at Sedgefield in December Carlisle in March and Ayr in April. In the 2009/2010 National Hunt season, Auroras Encore was beaten in his first six races before ending the season with a win in a handicap chase at Uttoxeter Racecourse.

After two defeats in November 2010, Auroras Encore was off the course for more than a year before returning as a ten-year-old in January 2012. He won a handicap chase at Haydock Park in April and then finished second to Merigo in the Scottish Grand National.

Auroras Encore finished no better than fourth in his first five races of the 2012/2013 season before taking part in the Grand National at Aintree on 6 April. Starting at odds of 66/1 he won the race by nine lengths from Cappa Bleu and Teaforthree. His jockey Ryan Mania, 23, was having his first ride in the race. On 20 April Auroras Encore attempted to become the first horse since Red Rum to win the Grand National and the Scottish Grand National. Carrying top weight of 164 pounds he started at odds of 14/1 and was pulled up on the final circuit.

Auroras Encore began the next season at Wetherby in December where he finished last of the five finishers in the Rowland Meyrick Chase. On 25 January the gelding finished last, beaten more than sixty lengths, in the Great Yorkshire Chase at Doncaster. After the race, he was found to have sustained a fracture to his right foreleg and was retired from racing.

== Pedigree ==
Pedigree of Auroras Encore (IRE), bay gelding, 2002
Sire Second Empire (IRE) 1995	Fairy King; 1982	Northern Dancer	Nearctic
Sire Second Empire (IRE) 1995	Fairy King; 1982	Northern Dancer	Natalma
Sire Second Empire (IRE) 1995	Fairy King; 1982	Fairy Bridge	Bold Reason
Sire Second Empire (IRE) 1995	Fairy King; 1982	Fairy Bridge	Special
Sire Second Empire (IRE) 1995	Welsh Love; 1986	Ela-Mana-Mou	Pitcairn
Sire Second Empire (IRE) 1995	Welsh Love; 1986	Ela-Mana-Mou	Rose Bertin
Sire Second Empire (IRE) 1995	Welsh Love; 1986	Welsh Flame	Welsh Pageant
Sire Second Empire (IRE) 1995	Welsh Love; 1986	Welsh Flame	Electric Flash
Dam Sama Veda (IRE) 1992	Rainbow Quest; 1981	Blushing Groom	Red God
Dam Sama Veda (IRE) 1992	Rainbow Quest; 1981	Blushing Groom	Runaway Bride
Dam Sama Veda (IRE) 1992	Rainbow Quest; 1981	I Will Follow	Herbager
Dam Sama Veda (IRE) 1992	Rainbow Quest; 1981	I Will Follow	Where You Lead
Dam Sama Veda (IRE) 1992	Samsova; 1987	Shareef Dancer	Northern Dancer
Dam Sama Veda (IRE) 1992	Samsova; 1987	Shareef Dancer	Sweet Alliance
Dam Sama Veda (IRE) 1992	Samsova; 1987	Deadly Serious	Queen's Hussar
Dam Sama Veda (IRE) 1992	Samsova; 1987	Deadly Serious	Joking Apart (Family: 19-c)
