= Wrath of Titans =

Irish-bred Thoroughbred racehorse

- Sire: Oscar
- Grandsire: Sadlers Wells
- Dam: Glen Empress
- Damsire: Lancastrian
- Sex: Gelding
- Foaled: 20 April 2009
- Country: Ireland
- Colour: Bay
- Breeder: William O'Gorman
- Owner: Gigginstown House Stud
- Trainer: Gordon Elliot
- Record: 24: 6-2-4
- Earnings: £128,403

Major wins
- Kerry National (2016)
- Last updated on 6 October 2016

Wrath of Titans is an Irish bred racehorse that won the Guinness Kerry National in 2016.

The horse was bred by William O'Gorman at Holycross, Co. Tipperary. He was sired by Oscar and is out of the Lancastrian mare Glen Empress. He is a half-brother to Irish Grand National winner Thunder And Roses.

His dam has also produced Black Type performers; Shirley Casper (Grade 2 winner, Grade 1 placed), Oligarch Society and Lonesome Dove.

Wrath of Titans won the 2016 Kerry National by 5 lengths for trainer Gordon Elliot and amateur lady jockey Lisa O'Neill and returned at odds of 7/1.

He was sold at the Goffs Land Rover Sale as a 3-year-old, bought by Gordon Elliot for Gigginstown House Stud.

After sustaining an injury in the Cork National Chase the horse was humanely euthanised.
