= Charlotte Brew =

British equestrian

Charlotte Brew is a British equestrian.

== Career ==
She made history in 1977, when she was the first woman to ride in the Grand National, on her horse Barony Fort. Women were allowed to ride in the race for the first time because of the passing of the Sex Discrimination Act 1975.

In addition to the legislation, the horse's previous race performance made it possible for Brew to enter the Grand National. Because Brew's horse, Barony Fort, finished fourth in the 1976 Foxhunters' Chase at Aintree the horse was permitted to race in the Grand National.

Brew and Barony Fort got as far as the 27th fence where the horse refused and she was unable to fully complete the race. However, she paved the way for female jockeys in this race and the first woman to complete the Grand National was Geraldine Rees in 1982.

Later in 1977 she became the fourth woman to participate in Velká pardubická. With Barony Fort she did not finish after two falls.

By 2015, forty years since the passing of the Sex Discrimination Act, a total of 15 female jockeys had participated in 18 Grand Nationals.

== See also ==
- List of female Grand National jockeys
