= Ryan Mania =

British National Hunt jockey

Personal information
- Born: 23 December 1989 (age 36) Galashiels, Scotland, United Kingdom
- Occupation: National Hunt jockey

Horse racing career
- Sport: Horse racing

Major racing wins
- 2013 Grand National

Significant horses
- Auroras Encore

Ryan Mania (born 23 December 1989) is a British National Hunt jockey from Galashiels, most famous for winning the 2013 Grand National on the Sue Smith-trained Auroras Encore, at starting odds of 66/1.

== Early life and career ==
Mania was born in 1989, in Galashiels, Scotland to joiner Kevin and mental health worker Lesley Mania, who first sat him on a Shetland pony aged three. He began working with point-to-point horses aged 12, and rode for Peter Monteith and subsequently for Howard Johnson, before Johnson lost his trainer's licence at the end of 2011.

At this point he left jump racing to work for his local hunt, the Fife Foxhounds as whipper-in. But over the winter, he started feeling he was missing out after seeing horses running which he had ridden previously and, encouraged by his agent, Bruce Jeffrey, he returned to ride for Sue Smith.

== 2013 Grand National ==
Mania had his first ride in the Grand National in 2013, and was the unexpected winner, riding 66/1 outsider Auroras Encore, and winning by nine lengths. As a 23-year-old, he was one of the youngest people to ever win the Grand National, and was also the first Scottish jockey to win the race for 117 years. He had previously been beaten by a head on the horse in the 2012 Scottish Grand National.

He made further headlines through a fall on a different horse for Sue Smith the following day, which saw him airlifted to the Royal Victoria Infirmary hospital with suspected neck and back injuries. It was later discovered he had fractured a vertebra at the base of his neck. He returned to race riding on the first day of the Scottish Grand National meeting at Ayr on 19 April 2013.

== Retirement ==
Mania announced his retirement from riding in November 2014 at the age of 25, citing problems maintaining his riding weight as the main reason and saying that he no longer got a "kick out of winning" After retiring from jump racing he worked as a kennel huntsman for the Braes of Derwent Hunt and as master huntsman for the Berwickshire hunt.

During his retirement he rode in a charity race at Aintree, the scene of his Grand National triumph, in aid of the Countryside Alliance. He also had a spell as assistant trainer to Sandy Thomson, a National Hunt trainer in the Scottish Borders.

== Comeback to racing ==
Mania made his comeback as a National Hunt jockey in October 2019, citing improvements in sports nutrition which allowed him to manage his weight more effectively than previously, as well as family influences and rediscovering his appreciation of the sport. The first race of his comeback was aboard Fair Minx at Ayr with his mount finishing seventh of ten runners.

Mania rode Hill Sixteen at the 2023 Grand National who fell at the first fence and died almost immediately from their injuries.
