= Synchronised (horse) =

Irish-bred Thoroughbred racehorse

- Racing silks of J P McManus
- Sire: Sadler's Wells
- Grandsire: Northern Dancer
- Dam: Mayasta
- Damsire: Bob Back
- Sex: Gelding
- Foaled: 7 March 2003
- Country: Ireland
- Colour: Bay
- Breeder: Noreen McManus
- Owner: J. P. McManus
- Trainer: Jonjo O'Neill
- Record: 20:9-1-3
- Earnings: £510,775

Major wins
- Midlands Grand National (2010); Welsh National (2010); Lexus Chase (2011); Cheltenham Gold Cup (2012)

Synchronised (7 March 2003 – 14 April 2012) was an Irish-bred, British-trained Thoroughbred racehorse. A specialist long-distance steeplechaser, he was best known for his performances in the 2011–2012 National Hunt season, when he won the Grade I Lexus Chase in Ireland before winning Britain's most prestigious steeplechase, the Cheltenham Gold Cup, on 17 March. He was euthanized after incurring a leg fracture in the Grand National on 14 April 2012.

== Background ==
Synchronised, considered a small horse by steeplechasing standards, was a bay gelding with a broad white blaze. He was bred at the Martinstown Stud, County Limerick, Ireland by Noreen McManus, the wife of his owner J. P. McManus. His sire, Sadler's Wells is best known for his success as a sire of flat racers, having been Champion sire on 14 occasions, but has also got notable jumpers including the three-time Champion Hurdler Istabraq, and is the sire of the leading National Hunt stallion Oscar. Synchronised's dam, Mayasta, was a successful racehorse, winning nine races, including five hurdle races and a steeplechase. McManus sent the horse into training with Jonjo O'Neill at Jackdaws Castle, near Cheltenham.

== Racing career ==
=== 2008–2009: Hurdle racing ===
Between February 2008 and March 2009, Synchronised was campaigned over hurdles and won three times from six starts. His most important success came at Haydock Park in February 2009 when he won a three-mile qualifying race for the Pertemps Hurdle. In the final of the Pertemps series at the Cheltenham Festival a month later he started at odds of 9/1 in a field of twenty-two runners but seemed to be well beaten when falling at the last obstacle.

=== 2009–2010: Novice chasing ===
Synchronised began his career as a steeplechaser by winning a minor race at Market Rasen Racecourse in November 2009. Seventeen days later he was moved up in class to win a Grade II Novices' Chase at Chepstow. The following spring, Synchronised bypassed the major novice races and was instead sent to Uttoxeter to run against more experienced horses in the Midlands Grand National, a handicap race over 4 miles 1 1/2 furlongs in which he carried 159 pounds. The race was run on heavy ground, making it an extreme test of stamina, and only three of the seventeen runners completed the course. Ridden by A. P. McCoy, Synchronised took the lead two fences from the finish and won by three-quarters of a length from the mare L'Aventure.

=== 2010–2012: Senior chasing ===
Synchronised won only once from five races in the 2010/2011 season, but that win was his most important so far. After starting the season with two runs over hurdles, he again showed his aptitude for extreme stamina tests as he carried 160 pounds to victory over 3 miles, 5 1/2 furlongs in the Welsh National in January. McCoy sent him into the lead three fences from the finish and he stayed on strongly to win by two and three quarter lengths. He once again bypassed the Cheltenham Festival, but his attempt to win a second Midlands National ended in failure as he finished third to Minella Four Star under top weight of 166 pounds. On his final start of the season he made no show before being pulled up in the Irish Grand National. He ended the season with an official rating of 155, twenty-seven pounds behind the champion Long Run.

The 2011/2012 season began with two more hurdle races before Synchronised was moved up to Grade I class for the first time in the Lexus Chase at Leopardstown Racecourse in December. The gelding established himself as a top-class steeplechaser by taking the lead at the last fence and pulling clear in the closing stages to beat Rubi Light in "impressive style" by 8 1/2 lengths at level weights. The race also showed that Synchronised did not need slow, heavy ground to show his best form. McCoy praised his horse's performance but was not over-enthusiastic about his prospects against the best steeplechasers saying "I don't think Kauto Star and Long Run will be too worried".

The betting for the 2012 Cheltenham Gold Cup was dominated by the former winners Long Run and Kauto Star, but Synchronised was also quietly fancied and started the 8/1 joint-third favourite with Weird Al in a field of fourteen runners. His task was made easier when Kauto Star injured himself and was pulled up at the tenth fence. Synchronised was still only sixth as the field approached the straight, but his stamina proved decisive as he stayed on strongly to dispute the lead at the last fence before pulling away to win by two and a quarter lengths from the 50/1 outsider The Giant Bolster. The win gave a first Gold Cup to J. P. McManus as an owner and was the first for O'Neill as a trainer. After the race the winner's connections were reported to be considering a run in the Grand National, in which Synchronised would carry top weight.

== Death ==
Synchronised was euthanised after he incurred a leg fracture during the 2012 Grand National. Despite being the market leader in the weeks leading to up the race, he had started the race as third-favourite, behind Seabass and Shakalakaboomboom. He appeared nervous at the start when he unseated his jockey, Tony McCoy, as the horses were preparing to line up for the race. The start was delayed until the loose horse was caught.

He fell at Becher's Brook, the sixth fence on the first circuit, unseating McCoy, who suffered a soft-tissue injury, but the horse did not appear to have sustained serious injury. He continued running riderless until attempting to jump the 11th fence where he incurred a fracture of the tibia and fibula in his right-hind leg and racecourse vets had to euthanise him.

Another runner at the 2012 Grand National, According To Pete, was also put down after being brought down at the same fence on the second circuit.

Three days after the National, J. P. McManus issued a statement in which he described his "deep sadness and sense of devastation" at the death of Synchronised. He explained that, "losing any horse is very sad but one as brave as Synchronised is a very big loss for all involved." He also revealed that the horse had been buried at Jackdaws Castle.

Speaking several weeks after the race, McCoy said that "Synchronised is a horse that I won't ever forget... it is one of those terrible things that you wish will never happen." When he retired in 2015, McCoy described Synchronised as his favourite racehorse saying that "he probably wasn't the greatest horse I'd ridden but he had the greatest will to win." Remembering the horse's death, he said "I cried for days afterwards. That affected me more than any other horse."

== Pedigree ==
Pedigree of Synchronised, bay gelding 2003
Sire Sadler's Wells	Northern Dancer	Nearctic	Nearco
Sire Sadler's Wells	Northern Dancer	Nearctic	Lady Angela
Sire Sadler's Wells	Northern Dancer	Natalma	Native Dancer
Sire Sadler's Wells	Northern Dancer	Natalma	Almahmoud
Sire Sadler's Wells	Fairy Bridge	Bold Reason	Hail to Reason
Sire Sadler's Wells	Fairy Bridge	Bold Reason	Lalun
Sire Sadler's Wells	Fairy Bridge	Special	Forli
Sire Sadler's Wells	Fairy Bridge	Special	Thong
Dam Mayasta	Bob Back	Roberto	Hail to Reason
Dam Mayasta	Bob Back	Roberto	Bramalea
Dam Mayasta	Bob Back	Toter Back	Carry Back
Dam Mayasta	Bob Back	Toter Back	Romantic Miss
Dam Mayasta	Sarahcee	Prominer	Beau Sabreur
Dam Mayasta	Sarahcee	Prominer	Snob Hill
Dam Mayasta	Sarahcee	Celestial Gold	Golden Cloud
Dam Mayasta	Sarahcee	Celestial Gold	Cellular (family 11-a)

- Synchronised was inbred 4 x 4 to the stallion Hail to Reason, meaning that the latter appears twice in the fourth generation of his pedigree.
