= Organisedconfusion =

Irish-bred Thoroughbred racehorse

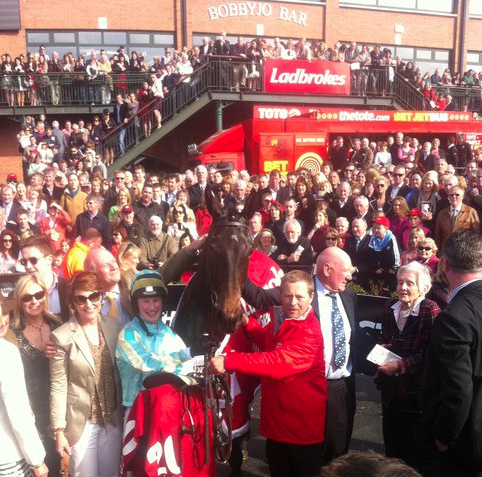
- Sire: Laveron
- Grandsire: Konigsstuhl
- Dam: Histologie
- Damsire: Quart De Vin
- Sex: Gelding
- Foaled: 2005
- Country: Ireland
- Colour: Bay
- Breeder: T Murray; Arthur Moore
- Owner: Mrs A Dunlop
- Trainer: Arthur Moore
- Record: 20: 3-1-3
- Earnings: £147,173

Major wins
- Irish Grand National (2011)

Organisedconfusion (foaled 2005) is an Irish bred racehorse that won the Irish Grand National in 2011. The horse is owned by Mrs Grace Dunlop from Balloo near Killinchy in County Down, trained by Arthur Moore in Dereens, County Kildare and ridden by his niece Nina Carberry, who became only the second woman rider to win the race at a starting price of 12/1. Nina Carberry became the fourth Carberry to ride the winner of an Irish Grand National in the past four decades. Organisedconfusion later ran in the Grand National at Aintree on the 14 April 2012, where he unseated Nina Carberry at the eighth fence (Canal Turn).
