= 2012 Grand National =

English steeplechase horse race

- Grand National
- Location: Aintree Racecourse
- Date: 14 April 2012
- Winning horse: (France) Neptune Collonges
- Starting price: 33/1
- Jockey: (Republic of Ireland) Daryl Jacob
- Trainer: (England) Paul Nicholls
- Owner: John Hales
- Conditions: Good (good to soft in places)

External videos
- Full replay of the 2012 Grand National Racing TV, YouTube

The 2012 Grand National (officially known as the John Smith's Grand National for sponsorship reasons) was the 165th annual renewal of the Grand National horse race at Aintree Racecourse near Liverpool, England. The showpiece steeplechase, which concluded a three-day meeting which is one of only four held at Aintree throughout the year, took place on 14 April 2012. The maximum permitted field of 40 runners ran the last 4 miles 856 yards (7.220 km) of Aintree's National Course featuring 30 fences, competing for record prize money of £975,000, making it the highest-valued National Hunt race in the United Kingdom.

Aintree had made a number of safety changes in the months leading up to the race, following the deaths of two horses in the previous year's National. The changes included reducing the severity of some of the fences, raising the minimum age of participating horses from six to seven years old, and requiring all runners to have previously been placed in a recognised steeplechase of at least three miles.

Neptune Collonges, ridden by Daryl Jacob, won the race, beating Sunnyhillboy in a photo finish and the closest ever finish to a Grand National. Neptune Collonges became only the third grey horse to win the 173-year-old chase, and the first since 1961. Joint-favourite Seabass finished third, which resulted in Katie Walsh, in her first outing in the race, scoring the best result ever for a female jockey in the Grand National. Synchronised, the 2012 Cheltenham Gold Cup winner and an early favourite for the National, and According to Pete both were euthanised after suffering leg fractures during the race. One fence was omitted on the second circuit as medics treated jockey Noel Fehily, who broke a leg in a fall on the first circuit. Two horses, Ornais and Dooneys Gate, had also suffered fatal injuries in the National's 2011 edition.

The race was televised live on the BBC for the last time, having broadcast every running since 1960. The rights to broadcast the next four renewals had been won by Channel 4. The BBC's relationship with the race did continue however through its live radio broadcast rights, which it had held since being first aired in 1927.

== Safety changes ==
In 2011, Aintree announced some modifications to the format of the race and to the National Course in time for the 2012 Grand National. The changes followed a review of the 2011 race in which two horses suffered highly publicised fatal falls. A review conducted by the racecourse authorities, and the British Horseracing Authority, in consultation with the Royal Society for the Prevention of Cruelty to Animals and World Horse Welfare, recommended the following amendments to the course:

- Fence 1 (fence 17 on second circuit) to be levelled out on the landing side to remove several minor contours.
- Fence 4 (fence 20 on second circuit) to be rebuilt and reduced in height by two inches to 4 ft 10 in.
- Becher's Brook (fence 6 on first circuit, fence 22 on second circuit) to have its drop on the landing side reduced by between four and five inches.
- Height of toe-boards at the base of all fences to be increased from nine inches to 14 inches, in line with ordinary fences.

Other recommendations were made to improve the safety of race participants, including:

- The requirement for participating horses to have previously finished fourth or better in a recognised steeplechase of at least three miles.
- The minimum age of eligible horses to be increased from six to seven years.
- The creation of a new post-race washdown and cooling area.
- Flexibility in shortening or removing the pre-race parade in hot weather.

== Race card ==
Entries for the race had to be submitted by 31 January 2012. On 1 February, Aintree announced that 82 horses had been entered for consideration in the 2012 Grand National, including the previous year's winner Ballabriggs and 2009's outside winner Mon Mome. Ballabriggs was bidding to become the first horse to win back-to-back Nationals since Red Rum in 1973 and 1974, who incidentally was trained by Ginger McCain, the father of Ballabriggs' trainer Donald McCain, Jr.

Among the early favourites for the race – alongside Ballabriggs – were Junior (trained by 2008's winning trainer David Pipe), Synchronised (the winner of the Lexus Chase on 28 December 2011 and later the 2012 Cheltenham Gold Cup), Weird Al (winner in the October 2011 Charlie Hall Chase), and Midnight Chase (first in the Cotswold Chase on 4 February 2012). Synchronised was attempting to become the first horse since Golden Miller in 1934 to win both the Gold Cup and Grand National in the same year.

Handicap weights were announced by the British Horseracing Authority in London on 14 February. The top weight of 11 stone 10 lb was allocated to the nine-year-old Sychronised. Ballabriggs was allotted 11 stone 9 lb, and 11 stone 8 lb to both Weird Al and Midnight Chase. The remaining entries were allotted a range of handicaps down to 9 stone.

After a first scratchings deadline on 28 February, five entries were taken out. Following a second round of scratchings on 20 March 59 horses remained entered. At a five-day confirmation stage on 9 April a further 11 entrants were withdrawn, leaving 48 potential runners. Among those were 2012 Thyestes Chase winner On His Own, and West End Rocker who finished a comfortable first in the Becher Chase in December 2011.

Other trainers returning to the race included Kim Bailey, who had success with Mr. Frisk in the 1990 National, with ten-year-old Midnight Haze; Gordon Elliott, who trained the 2007 winner Silver Birch, with the grey Chicago Grey; and Ted Walsh, responsible for Papillon's victory in 2000 (his son Ruby took that ride), with Seabass who was ridden by his daughter Katie in her first Grand National. With both Katie Walsh and Nina Carberry in the line-up, 2012 marked the first time since 1988 that more than one female jockey participated in the same National.

Jockey Tony McCoy rode Synchronised and was aiming for his second Grand National success in 17 attempts. Niall Madden (on In Compliance) was another seeking a second win after guiding Numbersixvalverde to victory in 2006, while 2003 winning jockey Barry Geraghty returned to ride Shakalakaboomboom. Paul Carberry took the ride of Chicago Grey and Ballabriggs defended his title under the jockeyship once again of Jason Maguire, while Timmy Murphy was a sixth and final jockey aiming for another National win, having ridden Comply or Die in 2008.

On 12 April a final declaration of runners was made and the maximum field of 40 competitors plus four reserves was announced. Any withdrawals before 9 am on 13 April would have been replaced by a reserve. However, no reserves were needed as all 40 went forward on the morning before the race.

Entries for the 2012 Grand National. All horses are Great Britain unless stated.
Number	Horse	Age	Handicap (st-lb)	SP	Jockey	Trainer	Owner
1	Synchronised (IRE)	9	11–10	10/1	Tony McCoy	Jonjo O'Neill	J. P. McManus
2	Ballabriggs (IRE)	11	11–09	12/1	Jason Maguire	Donald McCain, Jr.	Trevor Hemmings
3	Weird Al (IRE)	9	11–08	28/1	Timmy Murphy	Donald McCain, Jr.	Brannon, Dennis, Dick, Holden
4	Neptune Collonges (FRA)	11	11–06	33/1	Daryl Jacob	Paul Nicholls	John Hales
5	Calgary Bay (IRE)	9	11–06	33/1	Dominic Elsworth	Henrietta Knight	Camilla Radford
6	Alfa Beat (IRE)	8	11–05	50/1	Davy Russell	John Hanlon (IRE)	Irvin Naylor
7	Planet of Sound	10	11–05	33/1	Richard Johnson	Philip Hobbs	Charles Lloyd-Baker
8	Black Apalachi (IRE)	13	11–03	25/1	Denis O'Regan	Dessie Hughes (IRE)	Teresa Burke
9	Deep Purple	11	11–03	25/1	Jamie Moore	Evan Williams	Paul Green
10	Junior	9	11–02	16/1	Tom Scudamore	David Pipe	Middleham Park Racing
11	Chicago Grey (IRE)	9	10–13	20/1	Paul Carberry	Gordon Elliott (IRE)	John Earls
12	Tatenen (FRA)	8	10–13	100/1	Andrew Thornton	Richard Rowe	Stewart family
13	Seabass (IRE)	9	10–12	8/1 joint-fav	Katie Walsh	Ted Walsh (IRE)	Gunners Syndicate
14	Shakalakaboomboom (IRE)	8	10–12	8/1 joint-fav	Barry Geraghty	Nicky Henderson	Liam Breslin
15	West End Rocker (IRE)	10	10–12	16/1	Wayne Hutchinson	Alan King	Barry Winfield & Tim Leadbeater
16	According to Pete	11	10–12	28/1	Harry Haynes	Malcolm Jefferson	Peter Nelson
17	On His Own (IRE)	8	10–11	14/1	Paul Townend*	Willie Mullins (IRE)	Andrea & Graham Wylie
18	Always Right (IRE)	10	10–10	25/1	James Reveley	John Wade	John Wade
19	Cappa Bleu (IRE)	10	10–10	16/1	Paul Moloney	Evan Williams	William & Angela Rucker
20	Rare Bob (IRE)	10	10–09	40/1	Bryan Cooper	Dessie Hughes (IRE)	D A Syndicate
21	Organisedconfusion (IRE)	7	10–08	20/1	Nina Carberry	Arthur Moore (IRE)	Grace Dunlop
22	Treacle (IRE)	11	10–08	22/1	Andrew Lynch	Tom Taaffe (IRE)	Bjorn Nielsen
23	The Midnight Club (IRE)	11	10–08	40/1	Andrew Tinkler*	Willie Mullins (IRE)	Susannah Ricci
24	Mon Mome (FRA)	12	10–08	50/1	Aidan Coleman	Venetia Williams	Vida Bingham
25	Arbor Supreme (IRE)	10	10–07	100/1	Mark Walsh	Jonjo O'Neill	J. P. McManus
26	Sunnyhillboy (IRE)	9	10–05	16/1	Richie McLernon	Jonjo O'Neill	J. P. McManus
27	Killyglen (IRE)	10	10–04	14/1	Robbie Power	Stuart Crawford (IRE)	David McCammon
28	Quiscover Fontaine (FRA)	8	10–04	50/1	David Casey	Willie Mullins (IRE)	J. P. McManus
29	Tharawaat (IRE)	7	10–04	125/1	Brian O'Connell	Gordon Elliott (IRE)	Gigginstown House Stud
30	Becauseicouldntsee (IRE)	9	10–03	25/1	Davy Condon	Noel Glynn (IRE)	Noel Glynn
31	State of Play	9	10–03	40/1	Noel Fehily	Evan Williams	William & Angela Rucker
32	Swing Bill (FRA)	11	10–03	100/1	Conor O'Farrell	David Pipe	David Johnson
33	Postmaster	10	10–02	100/1	Dougie Costello	Tim Vaughan	The Bill & Ben Partnership
34	Giles Cross (IRE)	10	10–01	20/1	Paddy Brennan	Victor Dartnall	KCMS Partnership
35	Midnight Haze	10	10–00	80/1	Sean Quinlan	Kim Bailey	Kim Bailey Racing Partnership
36	Vic Venturi (IRE)	12	10–00	80/1	Harry Skelton	Dessie Hughes (IRE)	Seamus Dunne
37	In Compliance (IRE)	12	10–00	100/1	Niall Madden	Dessie Hughes (IRE)	Dessie Hughes
38	Viking Blond (FRA)	7	10–00	80/1	Brian Hughes	Nigel Twiston-Davies	Caroline Mould
39	Hello Bud (IRE)	14	10–00	33/1	Sam Twiston-Davies	Nigel Twiston-Davies	Seamus Murphy
40	Neptune Equester	9	09–09	100/1	Felix de Giles	Brian Ellison	Koo's Racing Club
R1	Any Currency (IRE)	9	09-08	—	—	Martin Keighley	Cash Is King Syndicate
R2	Our Island (IRE)	7	09-07	—	—	Tim Vaughan	David Fox
R3	Abbeybraney (IRE)	11	09-05	—	—	Sue Johnson	George Bewley
R4	Smoking Aces (IRE)	8	09-05	—	—	Tom Taaffe (IRE)	J. P. McManus

* Ruby Walsh was due to ride On His Own but was stood down after suffering a concussion in a fall during the Aintree Hurdle before the Grand National. Paul Townend took over the ride of On His Own, with Andrew Tinkler coming in to replace Townend on The Midnight Club.

== Race overview ==
The start of the race was delayed after Synchronised unseated his rider, Tony McCoy during the warm-up and got loose on the racecourse. After the horse was caught and brought back to the start by McCoy, there were further delays caused by overly-keen riders and horses breaching the starting tape twice.

Eventually, starter Hugh Barclay got all 40 runners away. As the field charged down toward the first fence, Giles Cross and Becauseicouldntsee were amongst the early leaders, and Viking Blond became the race's first faller. His jockey Brian Hughes suffered a suspected broken cheekbone in the fall. West End Rocker and Junior, both 16/1 shots, fell at the second fence. By the fourth, Shakalakaboomboom had taken up a prominent position just ahead of the remainder of the field. The fifth fence claimed three runners: State of Play unseated his rider Noel Fehily and Chicago Grey and Rare Bob were brought down. Fehily suffered a broken leg and a screen was soon erected around him as he was treated by medics, while course officials prepared for the fence to be bypassed on the second circuit.

Becher's Brook, the sixth obstacle, saw the well-backed Cheltenham Gold Cup winner Synchronised fall. McCoy suffered a soft-tissue injury but Synchronised did not appear to suffer serious injury, and he continued running riderless until the 11th fence where he fell again, fracturing his right-hind tibia and fibula; racecourse vets had to euthanise him.

Outsider Alfa Beat was a faller at the Foinavon fence after Becher's, and the next obstacle, the Canal Turn, saw five runners exit the race. Black Apalachi fell while the riders of Organisedconfusion, Tatenen, Killyglen and Becauseicouldntsee were all unseated.

Over the tenth, joint-favourite Shaklakaboomboom continued to lead from Planet of Sound and Seabass, ridden by Katie Walsh. Always Right and Hello Bud also held prominent positions. Treacle fell at the tenth and jockey Mark Walsh was unseated from 100/1-rated Arbor Supreme. Giles Cross was pulled up.

As the field crossed the Melling Road, Planet of Sound, who had been jumping well, led from Shakalakaboomboom, Seabass and Always Right. But three fences later, at The Chair, Always Right unseated rider James Reveley.

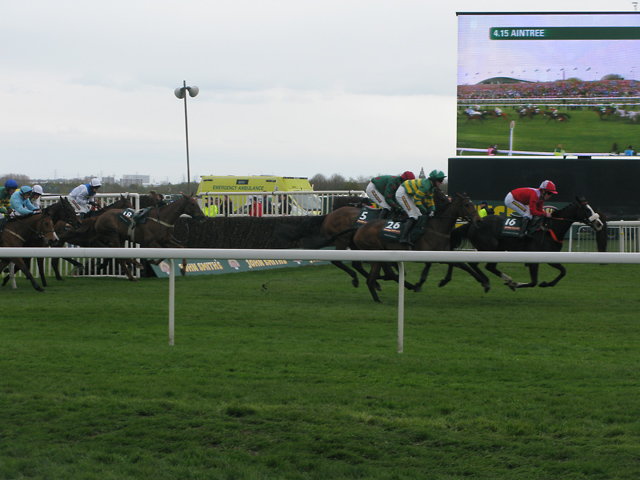
The first lap of the 2012 Grand National from the Tattershalls enclosure

On the second circuit, Planet of Sound extended his lead over Shakalakaboomboom and the 14-year-old Hello Bud to three lengths. Quiscover Fontaine from the mid-division fell at the 17th, Deep Purple was pulled up after the 18th, and 80/1 shot Vic Venturi refused to jump the 19th. The field was diverted around the 21st fence as medics attended to Noel Fehily who fell from his mount on the first circuit and broke a leg. This was the third time a fence was omitted on the second circuit of a Grand National, with the 20th and 22nd having been bypassed in 2011 due to equine fatalities. Fehily was later taken to Fazakerley hospital in Liverpool.

On His Own was fifth going towards Becher's Brook for the second time, but he fell at the fence, bringing down According to Pete, who was also struck by the passing Weird Al. According to Pete incurred a fracture to his left-fore humerus and was euthanised. Towards the back of the field, Mon Mome, who went off at odds of 50/1 and won in 2009 at odds of 100/1, was pulled up with Postmaster.

Over the second Canal Turn, Cappa Bleu and 100/1-rated In Compliance started emerging towards the front of the field, still led by Planet of Sound and Shakalakaboomboom. Over Valentine's, Neptune Collonges and Sunnyhillboy also began making notable progress, drawing close to Seabass and Hello Bud. Weird Al was the last faller of the race, at the 27th fence.

With only two left to jump, any one of a pack of eight horses appeared in with a chance of securing a place. Seabass and Sunnyhillboy touched down first over the final fence, followed closely by Shakalakaboomboom, In Compliance and Neptune Collonges. On the 494-yard run-in to home, Shakalakaboomboom, Ballabriggs and In Compliance began to lose ground and the trio of Sunnyhillboy from Seabass and Neptune Collonges charged into a tight race for the win.

One hundred yards from the finishing post, Sunnyhillboy held a one-length lead over his nearest rival, Neptune Collonges, but the 33/1 grey caught up and at the line nothing separated the pair to the naked eye. Jockeys, trainers, viewers and spectators waited for one-and-a-half minutes to hear the judge's official announcement over the Tannoy that Neptune Collonges had snatched victory by a nose. The winner completed the course in 9 minutes 5.1 seconds and earned over £540,000 in prize money.

== Finishing order ==
Finishing order of the 2012 Grand National
Position	Horse	Jockey	SP	Distance	Prize money
1	Neptune Collonges	Daryl Jacob	33/1	Nose	£547,267.50
2	Sunnyhillboy	Richie McLernon	16/1	5 lengths	£205,822.50
3	Seabass	Katie Walsh	8/1 joint-fav	7 lengths	£102,862.50
4	Cappa Bleu	Paul Moloney	16/1	2¾ lengths	£51,382.50
5	In Compliance	Niall Madden	100/1	2½ lengths	£25,837.50
6	Ballabriggs	Jason Maguire	12/1	3¾ lengths	£12,870
7	Hello Bud	Sam Twiston-Davies	33/1	¾ length	£6,630
8	Tharawaat	Brian O'Connell	125/1	6 lengths	£3,510
9	Shakalakaboomboom	Barry Geraghty	8/1 joint-fav	27 lengths	£1,950
10	Swing Bill	Conor O'Farrell	100/1	22 lengths	£975
11	The Midnight Club	Andrew Tinkler	40/1	14 lengths	
12	Planet of Sound	Richard Johnson	33/1	24 lengths	
13	Neptune Equester	Felix de Giles	100/1	14 lengths	
14	Calgary Bay	Dominic Elsworth	33/1	10 lengths	
15	Midnight Haze	Sean Quinlan	80/1	Last to complete	

- Distance measures from smallest to largest winning margin: nose, short head, head, short neck, neck, one length, a distance.

== Non-finishers ==
Non-finishers of the 2012 Grand National
Fence	Horse	Jockey	SP	Fate
1	Viking Blond	Brian Hughes	80/1	Fell
2	Junior	Tom Scudamore	16/1	Fell
2	West End Rocker	Wayne Hutchinson	16/1	Fell
5	State of Play	Noel Fehily	40/1	Unseated rider
5	Chicago Grey	Paul Carberry	20/1	Brought down
5	Rare Bob	Bryan Cooper	40/1	Brought down
6 (Becher's Brook)	Synchronised	Tony McCoy	10/1	Fell
7 (Foinavon)	Alfa Beat	Davy Russell	50/1	Fell
8 (Canal Turn)	Black Apalachi	Denis O'Regan	25/1	Fell
8 (Canal Turn)	Tatenen	Andrew Thornton	100/1	Unseated rider
8 (Canal Turn)	Organisedconfusion	Nina Carberry	20/1	Unseated rider
8 (Canal Turn)	Killyglen	Robbie Power	14/1	Unseated rider
8 (Canal Turn)	Becauseicouldntsee	Davy Condon	25/1	Unseated rider
10	Treacle	Andrew Lynch	22/1	Fell
10	Arbor Supreme	Mark Walsh	100/1	Unseated rider
11	Giles Cross	Paddy Brennan	20/1	Pulled up
15 (The Chair)	Always Right	James Reveley	25/1	Unseated rider
17	Quiscover Fontaine	David Casey	50/1	Fell
19	Vic Venturi	Harry Skelton	80/1	Refused
19	Deep Purple	Jamie Moore	25/1	Pulled up
22 (Becher's Brook)	On His Own	Paul Townend	14/1	Fell
22 (Becher's Brook)	According to Pete	Harry Haynes	28/1	Brought down
22 (Becher's Brook)	Mon Mome	Aidan Coleman	50/1	Pulled up
22 (Becher's Brook)	Postmaster	Dougie Costello	100/1	Pulled up
27	Weird Al	Timmy Murphy	28/1	Fell

== Colours ==
The colours carried by each runner, as declared by the BBC broadcast of the race.

John Smith's Grand National Chase (Grade 3 Handicap) 2012

Neptune Collonges
1st @ 33/1

Sunnyhillboy
2nd @ 16/1

Seabass
3rd @ 8/1 F

Cappa Bleu
4th @ 16/1

In Compliance
5th @ 100/1

Ballabriggs
6th @ 12/1

Hello Bud
7th @ 33/1

Tharawaat
8th @ 125/1

Shakalakaboomboom
9th @ 8/1 F

Swing Bill
10th @ 100/1

The Midnight Club
11th @ 40/1

Planet of Sound
12th @ 33/1

Neptune Equester
13th @ 100/1

Calgary Bay
14th @ 33/1

Midnight Haze
15th @ 80/1

Black Apalachi
Fell @ 25/1

State of Play
Unseated Rider @ 40/1

Deep Purple
Pulled Up @ 25/1

Mon Mome
Pulled Up @ 50/1

According To Pete
Brought Down @ 28/1

Vic Venturi
Refused @ 80/1

Postmaster
Pulled Up @ 100/1

Treacle
Fell @ 22/1

Rare Bob
Brought Down @ 40/1

Junior
Fell @ 16/1

Arbor Supreme
Unseated Rider @ 100/1

West End Rocker
Fell @ 16/1

Tatenen
Unseated Rider @ 100/1

Giles Cross
Pulled Up @ 20/1

Becauseicouldntsee
Unseated Rider @ 25/1

Killyglen
Unseated Rider @ 14/1

Weird Al
Fell @ 28/1

Chicago Grey
Brought Down @ 20/1

Always Right
Unseated Rider @ 25/1

Synchronised
Fell @ 10/1

Quiscover Fontaine
Fell @ 50/1

Alfa Beat
Fell @ 50/1

Viking Blond
Fell @ 80/1

Organisedconfusion
Unseated Rider @ 20/1

On His Own
Fell @ 14/1

== Reactions ==
Neptune Collonges' jockey Daryl Jacob dedicated the win to his friend and former colleague Kieran Kelly who died in a fall in 2003, adding: "I will treasure this day for the rest of my life. I didn't know where the winning post was so just kept on riding for all I was worth. This horse has a heart of gold. He's a real stayer and a class horse and he just stayed on the whole way to the line. We were reeling them in all the time." For trainer Paul Nicholls, Neptune Collonges was his 53rd runner in 20 Grand Nationals and his first ever win, which secured Nicholls his seventh consecutive trainers' championship.

Winning owner John Hales announced 11-year-old Neptune Collonges' immediate retirement from racing after the victory. Hales told how he and his family were sceptical about entering the horse in the National, after his best horse, One Man, died in a fall at Aintree in 1998. Hales said: "My thought after he jumped the last was just 'thank God', he's home and well. I have nothing against Aintree but after what happened here in 1998 with One Man the place has owed me that one, so thank you Aintree. My family was split about running here, my wife was 50/50 about coming here and my daughter Lisa is showjumping in south Wales although I think she might have jumped off when she hears what has happened!"

Following the deaths of Synchronised and According to Pete, and the bypassing of the 21st fence while medics treated jockey Noel Fehily's broken leg, much of the media attention again focused on the safety of horses and riders in the steeplechase. Aintree Racecourse released a statement in which managing director Julian Thick said: "We are desperately sad at these two accidents and our sympathies are with the connections of both horses. Safety is the first priority for the organisers of the Grand National and we make every effort to ensure that everyone involved in the event is able to participate in safety. Horseracing is a sport that is very carefully regulated and monitored, but risk can never be completely removed. All horses and riders in the Grand National have to meet very high standards set by an independent panel of experts. After today, we will, as always, be looking at all aspects of this year's race to see how we can improve safety further."

The British Horseracing Authority's director of equine science and welfare said : "[The Grand National] has inherent risks, but, working closely with Aintree and other stakeholders, we do all we can to minimise these risks while maintaining the unique character of the race. The key data from these accidents will be collated... the BHA and Aintree review all incidents which occur during the Grand National meeting and consider what measures can be taken to address the risk of a repeat in the future. We consult and work with recognised welfare organisations such as the RSPCA, SSPCA and World Horse Welfare. It is our stated objective to continue to reduce the number of injuries and fatalities which occur in racing."

David Muir, from the RSPCA, said that the improvements to Becher's Brook were "a work in progress." Addressing the question of whether too many runners took part in the race he said, "I didn't see a lot of jostling, bumping and boring, but I want to look at it again." Muir added: "We need to reduce risk levels and see more finishers. We've had three days' racing and one horse that died on the flat and now two in the Grand National. The faller rate is too high and has to be addressed. Is the race cruel? No one put a horse into this race to see it suffer or die for their own gratification. That would be a definition of the word 'cruel'."

Roly Owers, chief executive of World Horse Welfare, said : "Over the coming days, it will be important to establish the facts. We won't know what if any changes will need to be made until we know the exact circumstances of their falls. No race, especially the Grand National, can be without risks but there is a balance between acceptable and unacceptable risk and we need to strive to get that balance right."

Winning trainer Nicholls, who also lost Ornais in a fatal fall in the 2011 Grand National, told the BBC that "no stone is left unturned" in the attempt to minimise the risk to participants in the race. Veteran jockey Richard Pitman gave his view "that things will have to be changed and I don't agree with the fences being smaller. That encourages horses to go faster. But I think the number of runners should be cut." The size of the field was also an area of concern raised by the RSPCA's chief executive, Gavin Grant, who added: "We need to look at the landing areas. Some improvements have been made there, but when you've got a drop on the other side of the fence [as with Becher's Brook] a horse isn't expecting that."

Speaking several weeks after the race, Sychronised's jockey Tony McCoy said that he had been "trying to forget" about the National but that "Synchronised is a horse that I won't ever forget... its one of those terrible things that you wish will never happen."

== Broadcasting ==
As they come to the elbow, Seabass is not done with, Katie Walsh is coming back and Neptune Collonges is joining in as well. It's Sunnyhillboy with 100 yards left to go, Neptune Collonges digging deep on the nearside. Sunnyhillboy in front – he's shortening his stride, he's a half-length in front! Neptune Collonges is diving in and – oh, it's tight! It's very tight between Sunnyhillboy and Neptune Collonges – a photo in the Grand National!

— BBC commentator Jim McGrath describes the climax of the race.

As the Grand National is accorded the status of an event of national interest in the United Kingdom and is listed on the Ofcom Code on Sports and Other Listed and Designated Events, it is always shown on free-to-air terrestrial television in the UK. The rights to broadcast the race were held by the BBC and the National, along with several other races during the day, was shown on BBC One and the BBC HD channel. This was the 53rd consecutive year the BBC has televised the Grand National and the last time before Channel 4 took over broadcasting rights for a four-year period from 2013.

Clare Balding presented the BBC's television coverage, supported by Rishi Persad and retired jockeys Richard Pitman and Richard Dunwoody. Betting updates were provided by Gary Wiltshire and John Parrott.

The television commentary team consisted of Ian Bartlett, Darren Owen, and Jim McGrath who called the winner home for the 15th time. The race was aired on BBC Radio for the 80th successive year, and was also covered by Racing UK into bookmakers' outlets using alternative camera shots from the BBC with their own commentary team. An alternative commentary was also given by James May, shared with professional horse racing commentator Lee McKenzie, on the BBC Red Button service, for his TV show James May's Man Lab.

== Subsequent review ==
The British Horseracing Authority conducted its usual review of the Grand National in the weeks following the 2012 race, and it found that the deaths of Synchronised and According to Pete could have been neither "foreseen nor prevented". It posted letters to all 40 jockeys expressing disappointment at their conduct at the start line, where there were two false starts and some did not comply with starter Hugh Barclay's instructions on lining up.

The start of the chase had been delayed by eight minutes after Synchronised unseated his rider, Tony McCoy, and got loose on the course. Once caught, he was examined by a vet who found his heartbeat normal and "barely above a normal resting rate". The BHA's report confirmed that although Synchronised fell at Becher's Brook, unshipping McCoy, he continued running riderless until he fell five fences later, fracturing his right-hind tibia and fibula.

According to Pete was brought down when On His Own fell in front of him at Becher's Brook on the second circuit. While getting up again he was struck by Weird Al. The BHA could not be certain which incident resulted in the horse incurring a fracture of his left-fore humerus. Both Synchronised and According to Pete were euthanised by vets once it was concluded the fractures were untreatable.

== See also ==
- Horseracing in Great Britain
- List of British National Hunt races
- 2012 Epsom Derby
