= Minella Times =

Irish-bred Thoroughbred

- Racing silks of J.P McManus
- Sire: Oscar
- Dam: Triptoshan
- Damsire: Anshan
- Sex: Gelding
- Foaled: 4 March 2013
- Country: Ireland
- Colour: Bay
- Breeder: Cathal Ennis
- Owner: J.P. McManus
- Trainer: Henry De Bromhead
- Record: 18: 4–6–1
- Earnings: £485,000

Major wins
- Grand National (2021)
- Last updated on 14 April 2021

Minella Times (foaled 4 March 2013) is a retired Irish-bred Thoroughbred racehorse who competed in National Hunt racing. In 2021, he won the Grand National under Rachael Blackmore, becoming the first horse ridden by a female jockey to win the race.

== Background ==
Minella Times is a bay horse with no white markings bred in Ireland by Cathal Ennis at Quill Farm near Kilbeggan in County Westmeath. As a foal in November 2013 he was consigned to the Tattersalls Ireland November National Hunt Sale and was bought for €31,000 by John Nallen of Minella Racing. Nallen bought the future Cheltenham Gold Cup winner Minella Indo at the same sale. The horse was gelded before the start of his racing career.

He was sired by Oscar, a horse who finished second to Peintre Celebre in the Prix du Jockey Club before becoming a leading sire of National Hunt horses. His other major winners have included Lord Windermere, Rock On Ruby, Oscar Whisky, Paisley Park and Big Zeb. Minella Times's dam Triptoshan was an unraced mare from a family which had produced several good steeplechasers.

== Racing career ==
=== Early career ===
Minella Times began his career on the amateur Point-to-point circuit. He made his debut in a three-mile race on yielding ground at Belclare in which he fell at the last obstacle when two lengths clear of his rivals. Later that month the gelding was offered for sale at Tattersalls but failed to attract any bids. He then entered the ownership of J. P. McManus and was sent into training with Henry De Bromhead at Knockeen, County Waterford. On his first run under professional rules he ran fourth in a National Hunt Flat race at Cork Racecourse on 19 November.

=== 2018/19 National Hunt season ===
In the 2018/19 National Hunt season Minella Times was initially campaigned in Novice hurdle races. At Kilbeggan Racecourse on 11 May he started at odds of 9/2 for a maiden hurdle in which he was ridden by Mark Walsh and won by 2 3/4 lengths from Glorious Legend after taking the lead after the second last hurdle. He went on to finish fourth at Galway Racecourse in August and seventh when matched against more experienced opponents in a Handicap at Tipperary Racecourse on 7 October. In December, he finished runner-up in a novice hurdle at Punchestown Racecourse and then came home eighth in a novice handicap at Leopardstown Racecourse. On his final run of the season he finished third behind Galvin and Whoshotthesheriff in a novice hurdle at Navan Racecourse on 15 January.

=== 2019/20 National Hunt season ===
Minella Times began the 2019/20 National Hunt season by competing in novice chases. In the summer he finished ninth to Count Simon at Punchestown in June, second to Westland Row at Kilbeggan in July and fourth to Dandy Mag at Galway in August. At Clonmel Racecourse on 3 October he started 7/4 favourite for a three-mile novice chase but was beaten half a length into second place by Generator City. Rachael Blackmore took the ride when Minella Times started at odds of 6/1 in a two and a half mile handicap at Navan on 7 December when he was matched against more experienced chasers. After settling in sixth place in the twelve runner field he made steady progress, took second place approaching the last fence, and overtook Ben Dundee on the run-in to win by three quarters of a length. In his two subsequent races that year, the gelding finished second to Sumos Novios in a handicap at Limerick Racecourse on 29 December and came home sixteenth of the eighteen finishers in the Leopardstown Chase on 2 February.

=== 2020/21 National Hunt season ===
On 25 September 2020 Minella Times began his next campaign by carrying a top weight of 164 pounds in a handicap chase over 2 3/4 miles at Listowel Racecourse and starting at odds of 7/1 in a ten-runner field. Ridden by Blackmore, he was restrained towards the rear of the field before moving up to dispute the lead at the final fence and gained the advantage in the closing stages to win by half a length from Beyond The Law with Bay Hill three quarters of a length away in third. At Leopardstown on 27 December he contested the three-mile Paddy Power Chase and finished second to Castlebawn West, beaten 4 1/2 lengths by the winner. At the same track on 7 February he finished second again, beaten half a length by Off You Go in the Leopardstown Handicap Chase.

For his next race, Minella Times was sent to England to contest the Grand National over four miles, 2 1/2 furlongs at Aintree Racecourse on 10 April, and, with Blackmore in the saddle, started the 11/1 fourth choice in a forty-runner field. He raced in mid-division as the outsider Jett set the pace before moving into contention at the 26th fence. He took the lead on the final turn and steadily increased his advantage over the last two fences to win by 6 1/2 lengths from his stablemate Balko Des Flos. Blackmore, who became the first female jockey to win the race, said "I just got such an unbelievable passage through the race. Minella Times just jumped fantastic and brought me from fence to fence... you need so much luck to get around with no one else interfering first of all. You need so much to go right and things went right for me today. I feel so incredibly lucky. It is unbelievable, I'm just so thrilled."

=== Retirement ===
During preparation for the 2023 Grand National Minella Times sustained an injury to his shoulder which meant he wouldn't be able to run in the race and it was decided that he would retire.

== Grand National record ==
Grand National	Position	Jockey	Age	Weight	SP	Distance
2021	1st	Rachael Blackmore	8	10–3	11/1	Won by 6 1/2 lengths
2022	Did not finish- fell at the 9th fence	Rachael Blackmore	9	11-10	9/1	N/A

== Pedigree ==
Pedigree of Minella Times (IRE), bay gelding, 2013
Sire Oscar (IRE) 1994	Sadler's Wells (USA); 1981	Northern Dancer (CAN)	Nearctic
Sire Oscar (IRE) 1994	Sadler's Wells (USA); 1981	Northern Dancer (CAN)	Natalma (USA)
Sire Oscar (IRE) 1994	Sadler's Wells (USA); 1981	Fairy Bridge	Bold Reason
Sire Oscar (IRE) 1994	Sadler's Wells (USA); 1981	Fairy Bridge	Special
Sire Oscar (IRE) 1994	Snow Day (FR); 1978	Reliance	Tantieme
Sire Oscar (IRE) 1994	Snow Day (FR); 1978	Reliance	Relance
Sire Oscar (IRE) 1994	Snow Day (FR); 1978	Vindaria (USA)	Roi Dagobert (FR)
Sire Oscar (IRE) 1994	Snow Day (FR); 1978	Vindaria (USA)	Heavenly Body
Dam Triptoshan (IRE) 2004	Anshan (GB); 1987	Persian Bold (IRE)	Bold Lad
Dam Triptoshan (IRE) 2004	Anshan (GB); 1987	Persian Bold (IRE)	Relkarunner (GB)
Dam Triptoshan (IRE) 2004	Anshan (GB); 1987	Lady Zi (IRE)	Manado
Dam Triptoshan (IRE) 2004	Anshan (GB); 1987	Lady Zi (IRE)	Exbury Grace (FR)
Dam Triptoshan (IRE) 2004	Triptodicks (IRE); 1990	Sheer Grit (GB)	Busted
Dam Triptoshan (IRE) 2004	Triptodicks (IRE); 1990	Sheer Grit (GB)	Abettor
Dam Triptoshan (IRE) 2004	Triptodicks (IRE); 1990	Sheipeil Bawn	Laurence O
Dam Triptoshan (IRE) 2004	Triptodicks (IRE); 1990	Sheipeil Bawn	Swiftly Belle (Family: 1-k)
