= Thunder And Roses =

Thoroughbred racehorse

Thunder and Roses
- Sire: Presenting
- Grandsire: Mtoto
- Dam: Glen Empress
- Damsire: Lancastrian
- Sex: Gelding
- Foaled: 31 March 2008
- Country: Ireland
- Colour: Bay/Brown
- Breeder: William O'Gorman
- Owner: Gigginstown House Stud
- Trainer: M F Morris
- Record: 39: 5-10-2
- Earnings: £200,252

Major wins
- Irish Grand National (2015)
- Last updated on April 18, 2017

Thunder And Roses is an Irish-bred racehorse that won the Irish Grand National in 2015.

The horse was bred by William O'Gorman at Holycross, Co. Tipperary. The son of Presenting is out of the Lancastrian mare Glen Empress. He is a full brother to the high-class racemare Shirley Casper (Grade 2 winner, Grade 1 placed). The dam has also produced black-type performers: Wrath of Titans, winner of the Kerry National (Oscar), Oligarch Society (Moscow Society), Lonesome Dove (Milan).

He was sold at the Tattersalls Derby Sale as a 3yo, bought by Dessie Hughes for Gigginstown House Stud.

Trained by Sandra Hughes and ridden by Katie Walsh, he won the 2015 Irish Grand National by four-and-a-quarter-lengths at a starting price of 20–1.

The horse has also placed second in the Ten Up Novice Chase (Grade2), The Porterstown Handicap Chase (Grade2), The Bobbyjo Chase (Grade 3) and 4th in the 2017 Irish Grand National (Grade A)
