= Katie Walsh (jockey) =

Irish jockey

Katie Walsh (born 18 December 1984) is a retired Irish jockey who, in 2012, came third in that year's Grand National on Seabass, giving her the highest finish at that date for a female competitor, before Rachael Blackmore won the 2021 Grand National . Walsh is the daughter of amateur jump jockey, trainer and television pundit, Ted Walsh and the sister of top class jump jockey, Ruby Walsh. She rode three winners at the Cheltenham Festival.

On 6 April 2015, Walsh became the third woman to win the Irish Grand National riding Thunder And Roses.

== Early life ==
She was previously successful in the sport of Eventing. She began her riding career in 2003. Her first winner was Hannon at Gowran Park in 2003.

== Career ==
During the 2010 Cheltenham Festival she rode her first two Cheltenham Festival winners. She won on Poker De Sivola on the first day of the Festival in the National Hunt Chase Challenge Cup. She won on Thousand Stars on the last day of the Festival in the County Handicap Hurdle.

Walsh made her Grand National debut in 2012. She rode Seabass, who was trained by her father Ted Walsh. She finished third, which remained the best finish achieved by a female jockey in the Grand National until Rachael Blackmore won the 2021 race.

Walsh became the third woman to ride a winner in the Irish Grand National on 6 April 2015. She won on Thunder And Roses who was trained by Sandra Hughes and owned by Gigginstown.

On 27 April 2016 Walsh had her first grade 1 win. It was Blow by Blow in the Champion INH Flat Race at Punchestown.

In March 2018 Walsh rode her third winner of the Cheltenham Festival. It was the Champion Bumper, which was a grade 1 race. She brought her mount Relegate from the back of the field 5 furlongs out to catch the leader just at the line.

== Other work ==
Walsh began working as a racing ambassador for the Grand National Festival at Aintree Racecourse in 2015 and continued in 2016 and 2017.

== Personal life ==
Walsh married her long-time partner, the race horse trainer Ross O’Sullivan in Kildare in July 2013. Her sister-in-law is the Irish jockey Nina Carberry, who married Walsh's brother Ted Walsh Junior.

== Major wins ==
(Republic of Ireland) Ireland

- Champion INH Flat Race -(1) Blow By Blow (2016)

(United Kingdom) Great Britain

- Champion Bumper -(1) Relegate (2018)

== See also ==
- List of female Grand National jockeys
