= J. P. McManus =

Irish businessman

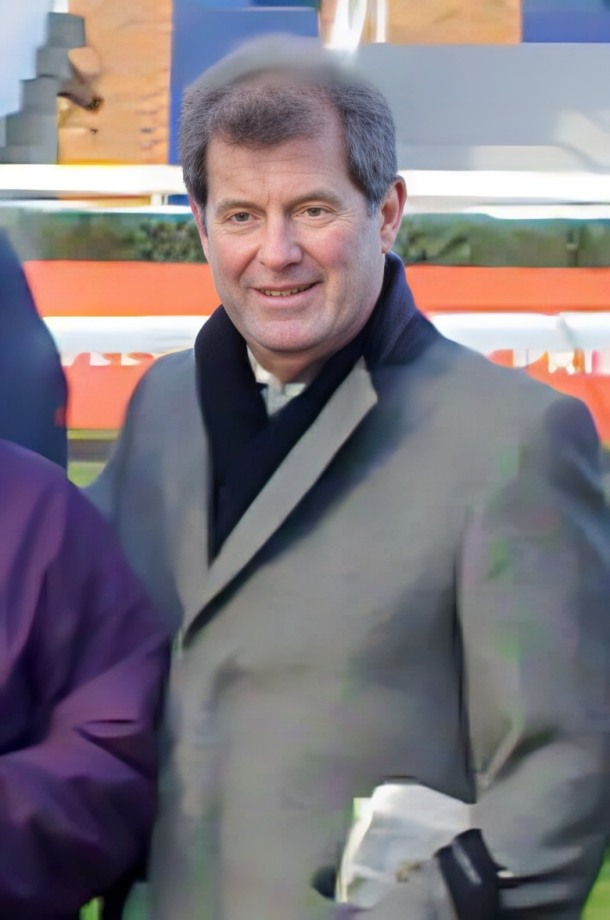
- J.P. McManus in 2010
- Born: 10 March 1951 (age 75); Limerick, Ireland
- Education: CBS Sexton Street
- Occupations: Businessman, bookmaker and foreign exchange trader
- Spouse: Noreen McManus
- Children: 3

John Patrick McManus (born 10 March 1951) is an Irish businessman and racehorse owner. He was a major shareholder of Manchester United until his stake was bought out by Malcolm Glazer in 2005.

== Early life ==
McManus was born in Limerick, Ireland, on the 10th of March, 1951. He was the eldest of five boys (JP, Kevin, Owen and twins Gerry and Michael). He attended the Christian Brothers School on Sexton Street, and lived in Ballygar and later Ballysheedy with his family. He began his career at his father's plant hire firm, and later in 1972 (age 21), he secured a bookmakers licence and took a pitch at Limerick Greyhound track.

== Career ==
From 1987 and into the early 1990s, McManus was involved in bookmaking, greyhound and horse racing and property development around the Limerick area as well as in Dublin through his companies Sundance Racing Limited, Contact Information Services Limited (now Phonovation Limited) and Leisure Holdings plc although the source of much of his early wealth remains unclear. At this time he lists his occupation as 'bookmaker' and claims that the source of his early wealth is from an unspecified line of private foreign exchange trading.

In 1994, McManus established his family office Leicosa SA, on the Rue du Rhône in Geneva, Switzerland. It is now primarily known for trading on the currency markets. Leicosa SA is linked to Novellus, a group of companies responsible for investing in property across the UK and Ireland. McManus is also the primary director of Liberties Strategic Services, a family private office based in Geneva and Hamilton, Bermuda. The firm have invested in the likes of Tamilnad Mercantile Bank and Ashanti Goldfields. McManus' brother Gerry is the finance director and is based in Limerick.

McManus often invests alongside John Magnier, and Dermot Desmond. The group owned successful nursing home group Barchester Healthcare until October 2025, when the company announced it had been acquired by Welltower, an American real estate investment trust, for £5.2 billion, and are investors in Mitchells & Butlers, a pub and restaurant company, where McManus holds a significant share of the business. Magnier, Desmond and McManus were all investors in Ladbrokes.

In 1998, McManus was part of a consortium that purchased Sandy Lane in Barbados from Granada PLC. The resort was demolished and rebuilt at a cost of $450million. In 2014, McManus added to his hotel ownership purchasing Adare Manor for €30 million. Shortly after, the resort was closed for a two-year renovation which included a significant golf course upgrade by designer Tom Fazio. The venue is set to host the 2027 Ryder Cup.

== Sport ==
=== Horse racing ===
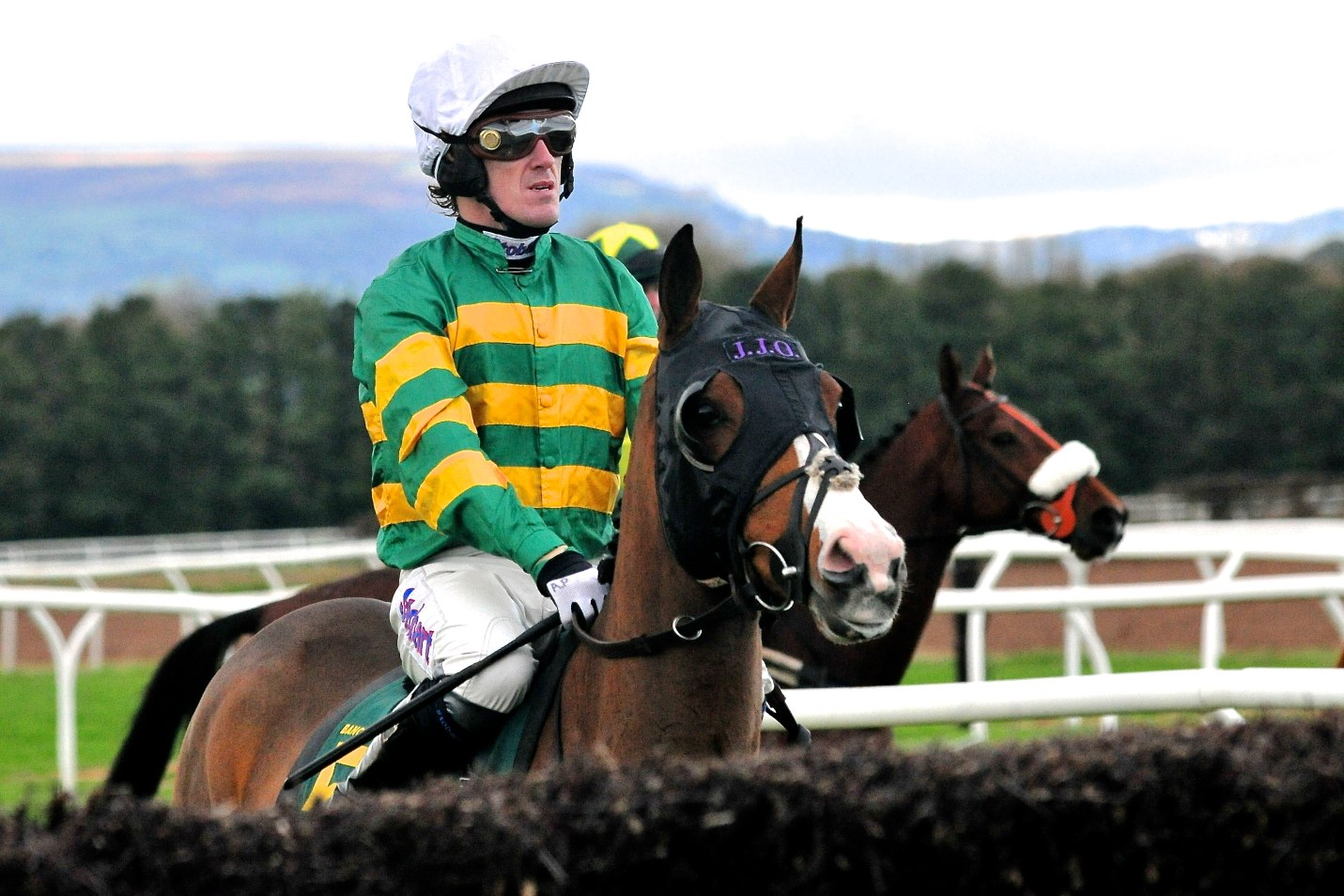
AP McCoy in JP McManus' racing silks

McManus is a racehorse owner, with his green and yellow silks becoming famous worldwide. His first horse was Cill Dara, named after County Kildare in Ireland. McManus's first Cheltenham Festival winner was Mister Donovan in 1982. Over the years, McManus has become the most successful owner at the Cheltenham Festival with over 80 winners to his name. Including Istabraq, who won four times at The Festival, Baracouda, a two-time Stayers' Hurdle winner, and Buveur D'Air who gave McManus his 50th winner at The Festival. Synchronised, a home-bred horse, was victorious for McManus in the Cheltenham Gold Cup, but later died at Aintree in 2012. His horse Inothewayurthinkin won the 2025 Cheltenham Gold Cup.

McManus has also had success in the Grand National. Don't Push It, ridden by McCoy and trained by O'Neill, won the 2010 Grand National Steeplechase. In 2021 McManus won the Grand National for a second time with his horse Minella Times, ridden by Rachael Blackmore and trained by Henry De Bromhead. In 2024 McManus won the Grand National for a third time with his horse I Am Maximus, ridden by Paul Townend and trained by Willie Mullins.

Alongside ownership of the horses, McManus also owns several training and stud facilities including Jackdaws Castle where former champion jockey Jonjo O'Neill trains, and Martinstown Stud in Ireland which has been developed significantly under his stewardship. McManus' daughter, Sue Anne, owns Islanmore Stud in County Limerick.

=== Golf ===
McManus owns Adare Manor. Under his ownership the golf course, originally designed by Robert Trent Jones, has been redesigned by Tom Fazio. It hosted the Irish Open in 2007 and 2008, and will host the 2027 Ryder Cup.

He also owns part of Luttrellstown Castle and the associated golf course which he purchased in 2006.

=== Manchester United ===
McManus, alongside fellow racing owner and businessman John Magnier, first invested in Manchester United in July 2000 buying 9.8 million shares for around £20million via a British Virgin Islands holding company Cubic Expressions. In 2001, the pair further increased their investment in Manchester United to a total shareholding of 9 percent, taking them to the second largest owners behind BSkyB. By 2003, Cubic Expressions had taken their ownership in the club to nearly 25%, having acquired shares from BSkyB and a Legal & General fund.

However, outside of their controlling shareholding, McManus and Magnier were involved in a row with manager Alex Ferguson relating to the ownership of a successful racehorse Rock of Gibraltar. This would lead the pair to sell their shareholding of the club to Malcolm Glazer for around €335million.

=== Limerick GAA ===
In 2023, McManus became the honorary lifetime president of Limerick GAA. He had been a sponsor and investor in the team for nearly twenty years.

=== J.P. McManus Pro-Am ===
McManus founded the J.P. McManus Pro-Am golf tournament in 1990. The first event took place at Limerick Golf Club, attracing professionals including Philip Walton, Des Smyth and Brian Barnes raising €1.5m for charity. The second event took place in 1995, and was supported by the European Tour. This led to major golfers including Jim Colbert, Bob Murphy and Tom Wargo from the PGA Senior Tour taking part. The final event at Limerick Golf Club took place in 2000, where 15,000 fans watched as professionals such as Tiger Woods and Pádraig Harrington played alongside celebrities including Alex Ferguson and Formula One team boss Eddie Jordan.

For 2005, the tournament moved to Adare Manor where the event raised €31m for 56 charities. Professional golfers including Tiger Woods, Ernie Els and Davis Love III played alongside stars such as Michael Owen and actor Peter Gallagher. Returning in 2010, with Woods and a star cast of professionals and celebrities the event raised a record €43.7m. The tournament was on hiatus until 2022, with Xander Schauffele taking the honours.

== Personal life ==
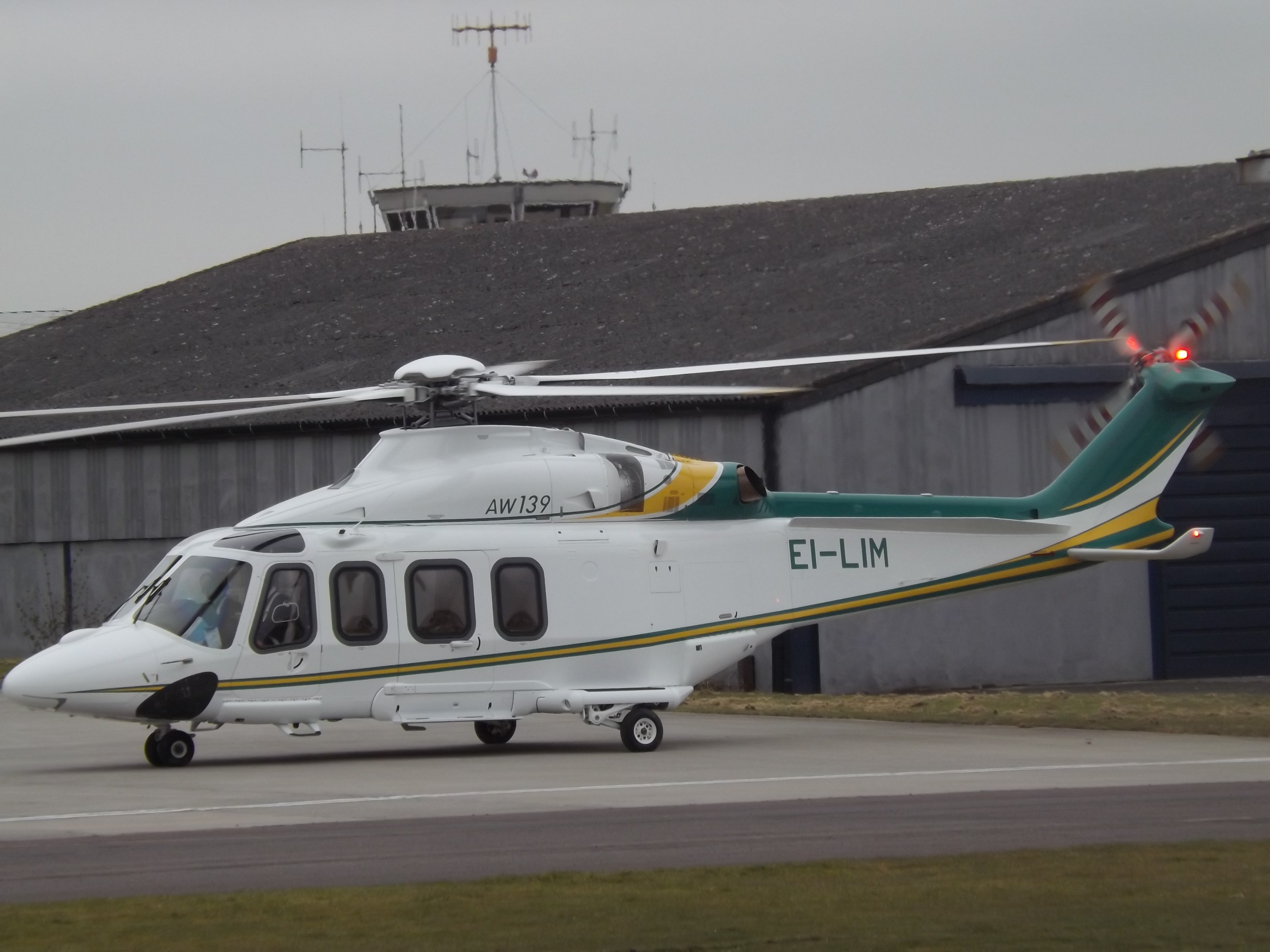
McManus' Helicopter

McManus is married to Noreen McManus, and has three children and four grandchildren. His net worth is estimated to be €2.1 billion. He is known to be close friends with golfer Tiger Woods, and his former retained jockey AP McCoy. McManus is also friends with Westlife singer Shane Filan, who he loaned €780,000 to help Filan buy a home after bankruptcy surrounding his property development company in 2012.

In 2006, he built a €20 million residence next to Martinstown Stud in Killmallock. The property has an artificial lake, nine bedroom suites, an 18-metre pool, a 200-seat cinema and an underground car park for six cars. In 2013, his €150 million mansion in Barbados was completed. He also owns a €100m home in Chelsea, London, and a large property on Ailesbury Road in Dublin purchased in 2011. He also retains a suite at the Dorchester Hotel on Park Lane.

McManus owns a Gulfstream G650 private jet. In July 2019, the aircraft was involved in an emergency landing at Shannon Airport following engine failure on a routine flight to the UK. McManus was on board at the time with four other people. He also owns an Agusta Westland AW139 helicopter registered EI-LIM and finished with green and yellow to match his racing silks.

A keen golfer, McManus has twice won the teams challenge at the Alfred Dunhill Links Championship in Scotland alongside professional Padraig Harrington. His son, Kieran, also has two victories in the tournament in 2009 and 2014. McManus has also competed in the BMW PGA Championship Pro-Am at Wentworth, where in 2023 his handicap was declared at 18.

=== Philanthropy ===
In 2008, McManus founded the All Ireland Scholarships scheme which offers financial support across Ireland for 125 students each year. McManus also has a charitable foundation which in July 2012, saw a donation of over €1 million to the Daughters of Charity foundation. McManus was awarded The Princess Grace Humanitarian Award in Monaco by Prince Albert II in the same year for his philanthropy in Ireland. In 2020, he donated equipment to the University Hospital Limerick during the 2019–22 Coronavirus pandemic.

In December 2023, McManus announced that he would donate €1 million to Gaelic games in every county in Ireland with the donation expected to arrive in January 2024. The donation was criticised by Social Democrats TD Jennifer Whitmore because of McManus's tax exile status This followed a previous donation of €100,000 to each county following Limerick's All-Ireland success in 2018.

The International Rugby Experience in Limerick was built with the support of the JP McManus Foundation and opened in May 2023. In 2024 the building was offered to Limerick City and County Council, however the council announced that after "extensive due diligence" it was unable to take on the cost of operating and funding the facility which was estimated to be two million euro per annum. The International Rugby Experience subsequently announced that it would close for good in December 2024. At a meeting of the Council it was reported that the building cost €30 million to build but had been valued at just €5 million. It was also noted that a necessary change in charity status of the International Rugby Experience, if handed over to the council, could incur a VAT liability of €12 million.

=== Tax status ===
McManus has been a tax exile in Switzerland since the 1990s and has often faced criticism of this status. In 2011 he spoke out against such criticism, claiming that he was merely an emigrant who set up a business abroad.

In 2012, McManus won $17.4 million gambling in the United States, of which $5.2 million was retained as income tax by the Internal Revenue Service (IRS). In 2016, The Irish Times reported that he was seeking a refund of the tax on the basis of the United States' double taxation treaty with Ireland; the IRS stated that McManus was a self-confessed tax exile out of Ireland and therefore – despite McManus's sworn affidavits to the contrary – not a legal resident of Ireland in 2012.

Following donations in 2018 and 2023 to the GAA, McManus faced criticism from journalist Mick Clifford who compared him, unfavourably, to an absentee landlord. The 2023 donation was also criticised by former Gaelic football player and commentator, Joe Brolly, who characterised it as an "act of self defense" to deflect from criticism of McManus' tax exile status. The donation was also criticised by Newstalk journalist, Shane Coleman, and political party, People Before Profit.

After McManus won the rights to host the 2027 Ryder Cup at Adare Manor, he wrote to Limerick City and County Council objecting to proposals to impose property tax on a plot with residential zoning in the estate arguing that the land in question is earmarked for a Ryder Cup bus terminal and should therefore not be taxed. The government has provided €58 million in taxpayer support to McManus to allow him to host the tournament. It has also invested €150 million to accelerate the completion of the Adare bypass ahead of the tournament. In September 2025 it was reported that McManus will seek a further €30 million from the government due to increases in the operational costs which were initially estimated to be €14.7 million.

=== Health ===
McManus was diagnosed with cancer in late 2008 and after receiving treatment in the United States, he was said to have recovered well.

== Glackin Report ==
In 1991, an Irish company law inspector, solicitor John Glackin, was appointed by the Irish Government to investigate complicated dealings involving Dermot Desmond and the purchase and sale of the former Johnston Mooney and O'Brien site in Ballsbridge, Dublin from the Liquidator to Chestvale Properties Limited and then on to Telecom Éireann. While Desmond represented himself as an intermediary in the sale, Glackin's report said Desmond, businessman JP McManus and John Magnier were beneficiaries of the sale. Desmond strenuously disputed Glackin's findings.

According to the Glackin Report, Hoddle Investments (the vehicle through which the deal was handled) executed two contracts with Telecom Éireann for the sale of the Johnston Mooney & O'Brien site for an aggregate price of £9.4 million, on 7 May 1990. Glackin concluded that McManus had lent £1.5 million to Chestvale to purchase the site from the liquidator in August 1989. McManus made the investment through an AIB account in Jersey in the name of J&N McMahon. Whether this account was to the benefit of John and Noreen McManus was not confirmed as AIB refused to break client confidentiality.

The report concluded that McManus was a beneficiary of the sale of the site to Telecom Éireann, and received £500,000 in cash from the transaction, which Dermot Desmond had stored in a tennis holdall in his safe. At paragraph 5.4.4 of the report, Glackin concludes that:

"I am satisfied, on a basis that I believe is reasonable, that Mr. McManus was promised by Mr. Desmond as his consideration for the advance a share of the profits and that this was either agreed in advance or during the period between 29th June 1990 when the money was received from Telecom, and 19th July 1990 when the request was made to Ansbacher for the first cash withdrawal of £100,000. I can find no evidence that any other person received any of the cash of £500,000 and find accordingly that it was received by Mr. McManus."

No criminal charges were made against McManus or the other principals involved resulting from the very damaging findings of The Glackin Report.
