= Jealousy (horse) =

British-bred Thoroughbred racehorse

- Sire: The Cure
- Grandsire: Physician
- Dam: Jewess
- Damsire: Jacques
- Sex: Mare
- Foaled: 1854
- Country: Great Britain
- Colour: Bay
- Breeder: Captain Skipworth
- Owner: Mr. Bayley; J. Bennett
- Trainer: Charles Balchin

Major wins
- Doncaster Grand National Steeplechase (1859); Grand National Steeplechase (1861)

Jealousy (1854 – December 1868) was a British Thoroughbred racehorse. She is best known for winning the Grand National Steeplechase in 1861. She also competed in the Grand National in 1859 and won the Doncaster Grand National Steeplechase that year. She was owned by Mr. Bayley and later J. Bennett and was trained by Charles Balchin.

== Background ==
Jealousy (who was originally called Relapse) was a bay filly foaled in 1854. She was sired by The Cure, who won the Champagne Stakes in 1843. As a sire he also produced the July Stakes winner Dictator and Ebor Handicap winners El Hakim and Underhand. Jealousy's dam was Jewess, a daughter of Jacques. She was trained by Charles Balchin.

== Racing career ==
=== 1858/59 season ===
In November 1858 Jealousy won a Hurdle race at Shrewsbury by one length from Wee Willie. Later in the month she won the Wellington Open Steeplechase at Wellington Racecourse, easily beating Young Magnet (second) and five others. On 2 March 1859 Jealousy carried 9 st 8 lb in the four-mile Grand National Steeplechase at Liverpool. The Brewer started the race as the favorite, priced at about 100/30, with Half Caste next at 100/15 and Jealousy third in the betting at about 9/1. With Jealousy being ridden by Joseph Kendall, the field started on their second attempt and Jealousy was positioned near the fore, but dropped back after the first fence. As the field turned onto the main racecourse, Jealousy was already well behind the leaders. She finished the race tailed-off, walking past the finish. Half Caste won the race by a neck from Jean du Quesne. At the York Steeplechase meeting she finished second in the Londesborough Great Handicap, one length behind winner Chance. In early May Jealousy started as the favourite for a Handicap Hurdle race at Manchester, but bolted and ended up finishing last. Later in May she won the Grand National Steeplechase at Doncaster by ten lengths from Omar Pacha.

=== 1859/60 season ===
In November 1859, Jealousy finished second, a neck behind winner Magenta, in a Hurdle race at Shrewsbury. Later in the month she finished fifth behind winner Goldsmith (who won by 20 lengths) in the Grand Open Steeplechase at Warwick and Leamington.

=== 1860/61 season ===
On 21 November 1860 Jealousy started as the odds-on favourite for a Handicap Hurdle race at Leamington. She took the lead after the first flight of hurdles. As the field turned into the finishing straight Bannockburn (who had fallen at the third hurdle and been remounted) closed down Jealousy's lead, but she soon pulled away again to win by ten lengths. Bannockburn was pulled up, leaving Romeo to finish second. On 13 March 1861 she started as the 9/2 joint-favourite, along with the 1860 Grand National winner Anatis, for the Grand National Steeplechase at Aintree. As in 1859 she was ridden by Joseph Kendall. She was reasonably close to the leaders in the early stages and took the lead from her stable companion Xanthus as the field entered the main racecourse. Xanthus retook the lead as they entered the racecourse for a second time, with Jealousy close behind in third. Jealousy was just leading over the final fence and staying in the lead to win by two lengths from The Dane, with Old Ben Roe a further two lengths behind in third place. Prior to the race some people had doubted whether she would stay the full race distance after her poor running in the 1859 National.

=== 1861/62 season ===
Jealousy given an entry for the 1862 Grand National, but was not declared to run.

=== 1862/63 season ===
Jealousy started the 1863 Grand National as the 3/1 favourite and was carrying 11 st 10 lb. Initially Medora took the lead, with Jealousy not being amongst the front runners. By the time the field had got over Becher's Brook, Medora was leading from Master Bagot and Jealousy had moved into fourth place. Jealousy then took the lead at Valentine's brook and by the time they were onto the regular racecourse she was clear of the field. As they jumped the fence opposite stands she was side-by-side with Medora. As the field approached Beecher's Brook for the second time, Yaller Gal took the lead, until she was challenged by Emblem, who in turn was followed by Arbury. Emblem pulled clear of the field and won by 20 lengths from Arbury. Jealousy finished the race in sixth place.

=== 1863/64 season ===
She was entered for the 1864 Grand National, but did not take part in the race.

== Stud career ==
Through her daughter Madame Colorado, Jealously was the direct female-line ancestor of Shining Way, who won the Irish Oaks in 1912. Shining Way foaled the Poule d'Essai des Poulains winner Dark Lantern. Jealousy died in December 1868.

== Pedigree ==
Pedigree of Jealousy, bay mare, 1854
Sire The Cure (GB) b. 1841	Physician (GB) b. 1829	Brutandorf b. 1821	Blacklock
Sire The Cure (GB) b. 1841	Physician (GB) b. 1829	Brutandorf b. 1821	Mandane
Sire The Cure (GB) b. 1841	Physician (GB) b. 1829	Primette; 1820	Prime Minister
Sire The Cure (GB) b. 1841	Physician (GB) b. 1829	Primette; 1820	Miss Paul
Sire The Cure (GB) b. 1841	Morsel (GB) b. 1836	Mulatto b. 1823	Catton
Sire The Cure (GB) b. 1841	Morsel (GB) b. 1836	Mulatto b. 1823	Desdemona
Sire The Cure (GB) b. 1841	Morsel (GB) b. 1836	Linda; 1825	Waterloo
Sire The Cure (GB) b. 1841	Morsel (GB) b. 1836	Linda; 1825	Cressida
Dam Jewess (GB) b. 1845	Jacques (GB) b. 1839	Touchstone br. 1831	Camel
Dam Jewess (GB) b. 1845	Jacques (GB) b. 1839	Touchstone br. 1831	Banter
Dam Jewess (GB) b. 1845	Jacques (GB) b. 1839	Parthenessa br. 1821	Cervantes
Dam Jewess (GB) b. 1845	Jacques (GB) b. 1839	Parthenessa br. 1821	Marianne
Dam Jewess (GB) b. 1845	Curl (GB) b. 1832	Confederate b. 1821	Comus
Dam Jewess (GB) b. 1845	Curl (GB) b. 1832	Confederate b. 1821	Maritornes
Dam Jewess (GB) b. 1845	Curl (GB) b. 1832	Ringlet br. 1826	Whisker
Dam Jewess (GB) b. 1845	Curl (GB) b. 1832	Ringlet br. 1826	Clinkerina

Note: b. = Bay, br. = Brown
