= 1858 Grand National =

English steeplechase horse race

- Grand National
- Location: Aintree
- Date: 6 March 1858
- Winning horse: Little Charley
- Starting price: 100/6
- Jockey: William Archer
- Trainer: William Holman
- Owner: Christopher Capel
- Conditions: Heavy (snowy)

The 1858 Grand National was the 20th renewal of the Grand National horse race that took place at Aintree near Liverpool, England, on 6 March 1858. Due to persistent snow and rain in the week of the race, it was postponed from the appointed day and run on the Saturday. Men were employed to clear snow from the course to ensure it was run within the week of the appointed day to ensure the anti post bets weren't void. The result was a race run in almost completely unsuitable conditions with what was regarded at the time as the poorest quality field of competitors in the history of the race.

== The Course ==
For the first time in over a decade, changes were made to the course with the complete removal of the obstacle at the Canal Lane, which had at one time been the site of the table top jump. One of the two hurdles on the racecourse proper was also removed, reducing the number of fences from thirty to twenty-seven this year.

First circuit: Starting from the field used every year since 1851, Fence 1 {15} was this year described as a bank instead of the ditch of previous years, Fence 2 {16} described as a hedge, ditch and cop instead of the bank of previous years, Fence 3 {17} Post and Rails, Fence 4 {18} described this year as rails and ditch, Fence 5 {19} Becher's Brook, Fences 6 {20}, 7 {21} and 8 {22} described this year as the triple banks, the last of which was the extreme turn or canal turn, Fence 9 {23} Valentine's Brook, Fence 10 {24} Ditch and quickset, Fence 11 {25} Post and rails, Fence 12 {26} Stump hedge and ditch, The hedge at Canal Bridge was removed this year.

The runners then turned at the first opportunity on re-entering the racecourse and made towards the fences in front of the stands. Fence 13 Gorsed hurdle at the distance, Fence 14 Artificial water jump, 13' 6" wide with a 3' high rail and 4' brook.

Second circuit: The runners then turned away from the Grandstands again and crossed Proceed's lane, into the a field that was formerly the wheat piece in previous years before following the same circuit until reaching the racecourse again. This time the runners continued to the wider extreme of the course before turning to run up the straight in front of the stands. The long length hurdles of previous years was removed, leaving only Fence 27 the Distance hurdle to be jumped

The runners then bypassed the Gorsed Hurdle and water jumps inside before reaching the winning post in front of the Main Stand. In order to be classed as a finisher, the runner had to pass the distance judge situated at the Gorsed hurdle.

== Build up and Leading Contenders ==
Poor weather decimated the anticipated field and betting for the race, with six horses due to line up on the original date, withdrawn by the time the race was run.

Treachery was the plunge horse on race day, reducing from 16/1 to 4/1 favourite, having finished third the previous year. Walter White too the ride as his fifth in the race, having finished fourth in 1856

Little Tom also attracted a lot of late gambles to be sent of at 5/1 with Ben Land being one of four riders making their National debut.

Lough Bawn at 5/1 was another who attracted lots of late gambles, though more due to the late availability of his rider, George Stevens than the horse itself. Stevens had been due to ride the highly fancied Knight Of The Shire until that horse was scratched on the morning of the race. Emigrant was another of the withdrawals, which left Tom Olliver, the most successful and experienced rider in the history of the race, to switch to Escape for a record eighteenth ride.

Conrad was sent off at 10/1 and rekindled memories for those older racegoers who could recall the first National of 1839 and that this was the name of the horse Captain Beecher had ridden. This would be Jones' second ride in the race.

Harry Lorrequer, Little Charley, and Morgan Rattler were all easy to back at 14/1. The former was the local favourite who had missed last year's race, having been pulled up on the second circuit in 1856. Fowler too the ride. the second was having his fourth attempt at the race with William Archer in the saddle and was always a popular dark horse despite having never looked like winning in each of his three previous attempts. The latter's prospects weren't heavily recorded by the press and was the fifth mount of T. J. Burrows, who had previously partnered Little Charley round to be fifth two years ago.

== The Race ==
The field were sent off at the third or fourth attempt, not helped by being recalled from the start to take part in the parade, which had been overlooked.

The report of the race was provided by the accounts of the riders, all of whom bar Fowler, spoke to the press on returning to the enclosure.

Glenamour refused at the first fence and although he continued the first circuit, his race was effectively over, pulling up tailed off at Proceeds lane.

Harry Lorrequer took up the running going to the second fence where Abd El Kader, a namesake of the former winner from a few years earlier, fell. Claudius and Joe Grahem refused and caused yet more issued for the already tailed off Glenamour

Conrad and Harry Lorrequer took the survivors down to Bechers Brook for the first time and while some press reports stated that Weathercock refused the third fence, the more detailed reports don't support this. His prominent position taking the brook suggested it would have been very unlikely he had been stopped. Claudius refused again here but was already among the runners effectively out of the race and toiling a long way behind the main field.

The fences around the bottom of the course were this year described as the triple banks, which included the Canal turn. Black Bess almost came to grief here, losing touch with the main field.

By Valentines, Conrad and Harry Lorrequer had opened up a handy four length lead over Weathercock with Moire Antique was now beginning to become detached from the group.

Harry Lorrequer kicked on down the canal side with Escape departing the race at the tenth fence, where the tailed off Joe Grahams race finally ended.

Conrad was back at the head of the field crossing the lane at the canal, which no longer had a hedge to negotiated, but shortly afterwards, while turning back towards the stands, Little Tom slipped in a gully on the slippery ground and fell, bringing down Moire Antique in the process. While the second favourite was quickly remounted at the rear of the contest, the grey mare remained prone until well after the field past by on the second circuit. However, concerns the horse would have to be euthanised were avoided when she got back to her feet, albeit having broken a blood vessel.

Harry Lorrequer lost a bit of ground with an untidy jump at the Gorsed hurdle to jump the water in fifth place behind Conrad, Little Charley, Weathercock and Xanthus. The remainder too the fence at two length intervals, headed by Lough Bawn, Treachery, Morgan Rattler and Black Bess before a long gap back to Little Tom who fell for a second time. Ben Land was encouraged by the crowd and his father nearby to remount and keep going, joined by the tailed off Glenamour as the tail ender came over the water jump. The pair were almost three hundred yards adrift crossing Proceed's Lane and gave up the chase at that point.

Conrad upped the pace down the Bechers for the second time, taking it in good style from Treachery and Black Bess who had made steady progress with Little Charley, Xanthus, Weathercock and Harry Lorrequer now going clear of Lough Bawn and Morgan Rattler.

The triple banks put paid to Treachery, who was desperately unlucky to overreach and injure a hoof at the first of them, pulling up immediately. Black Bess fell at the next and Harry Lorrequer departed at the Canal turn where the fading Lough Bawn cried enough and refused. Xanthus also survived a jumping error her that effectively put paid to their chances.

The race lay between Conrad, Weathercock and Little Charley at Valentines with the former starting to weaken as the trio go closer to the lane.

Weathercock and Little Charley were drawing clear as they turned for the home straight, with George Ede seen to be the one having to work harder on Weathercock as they approached the only hurdle to be jumped this year. Upon landing, Archer went for his whip on Little Charley to draw clear and win by four lengths. Xanthus was fifty yards back in third with twice that distance back to Morgan Rattler while Conrad had reduced to a canter long before the finish.

== Finishing Order ==
| Position | Name | Jockey | Handicap (st-lb) | SP | Distance | Colours |
|---|---|---|---|---|---|---|
| Winner | Little Charley | William Archer | 10-7 | 14/1 | 11 Minutes, 5 seconds | Purple, orange sleeves, black cap |
| Second | Weathercock | George Ede rode as Mr Edwards | 11-7 | 33/1 | 4 lengths | Blue and yellow stripes, black cap |
| Third | Xanthus | Gus Balchin | 11-0 | 25-1 | Fifty yards | White, blue armbands, red cap |
| Fourth | Morgan Rattler | T.J. Burrows | 10-4 | 14/1 | One hundred yards | Brown, orange sleeves, red cap |
| Fifth and last | Conrad | A. or E. Jones | 8-4 | 10/1 | Cantered in | Blue, yellow sleeves, quartered cap |
| Fence 22 {Canal Turn} | Harry Lorrequer | W. Fowler | 9-0 | 12-1 | Fell, Pulled up, Refused or Brought Down | White, orange cap |
| Fence 22 {Canal Turn} | Lough Bawn | George Stevens | 9-8 | 5/1 | Refused | Blue, yellow sleeves and cap |
| Fence 21 {Bank} | Black Bess | Denny Wynne | 9-6 | 33/1 | Fell | White, green cap |
| Fence 20 {Bank} | Treachery | Walter White | 9-8 | 4/1 Fav | Pulled Up {Over-reached and injured a hoof} | Light blue, orange cap |
| Fence 13 {Gorsed Hurdle} | Little Tom {Formerly Corrybantes} | Ben Land | 9-6 | 5/1 | Fell on the flat approaching the fence, {remounted and fell again 14, remounted and pulled up Proceeds Lane} | Blue, orange sash, black cap |
| Fence 13 | Moire Antique | F. Page | 9-0 | 50/1 | Brought Down on the flat, Burst blood vessel | White, orange cap |
| Fence 10 {Ditch & Quickset} | Escape | Tom Olliver | 10-10 | 20/1 | Crowded & Fell | yellow, black cap |
| Fence 2 {Hedge, ditch and cop} | Abd El Kader {Formerly The Clown} | Chris Green | 10-5 | 16/1 | Fell | Plum, green sleeves, black cap |
| Fence 2 | Claudius | Poole | 10-7 | 50/1 | Refused {went on tailed off refused again 5} | Indigo |
| Fence 2 | Joe Graham | Rutherford | 9-12 {carried 10-04} | 33/1 | Refused {Went on tailed off and Fell 10} | Blue and black stripes, white cap |
| Fence 1 {Ditch} | Glenamour | James Knott | 9-0 | 50-1 | Refused {Carried on tailed off, stopped Fence 2, carried on, pulled up proceeds lane} | Black, red sleeves and cap |

== Aftermath ==
Despite the awful conditions and poor quality field, Edward Topham was widely praised by the press for getting the race off within the time to avoid bets being voided. However, the fact the winner had competed three times previously without featuring prominently in any of them was cited as a measure of how poor the quality of the race was.

All the horses and riders returned safely, although Moire Antique remained on the ground for several minutes before getting back to her feet, having burst a blood vessel, while Treachery returned bleeding from the foot injury incurred when over reaching.
