= Chris Green (horseman) =

British racehorse trainer (c.1820–1874)

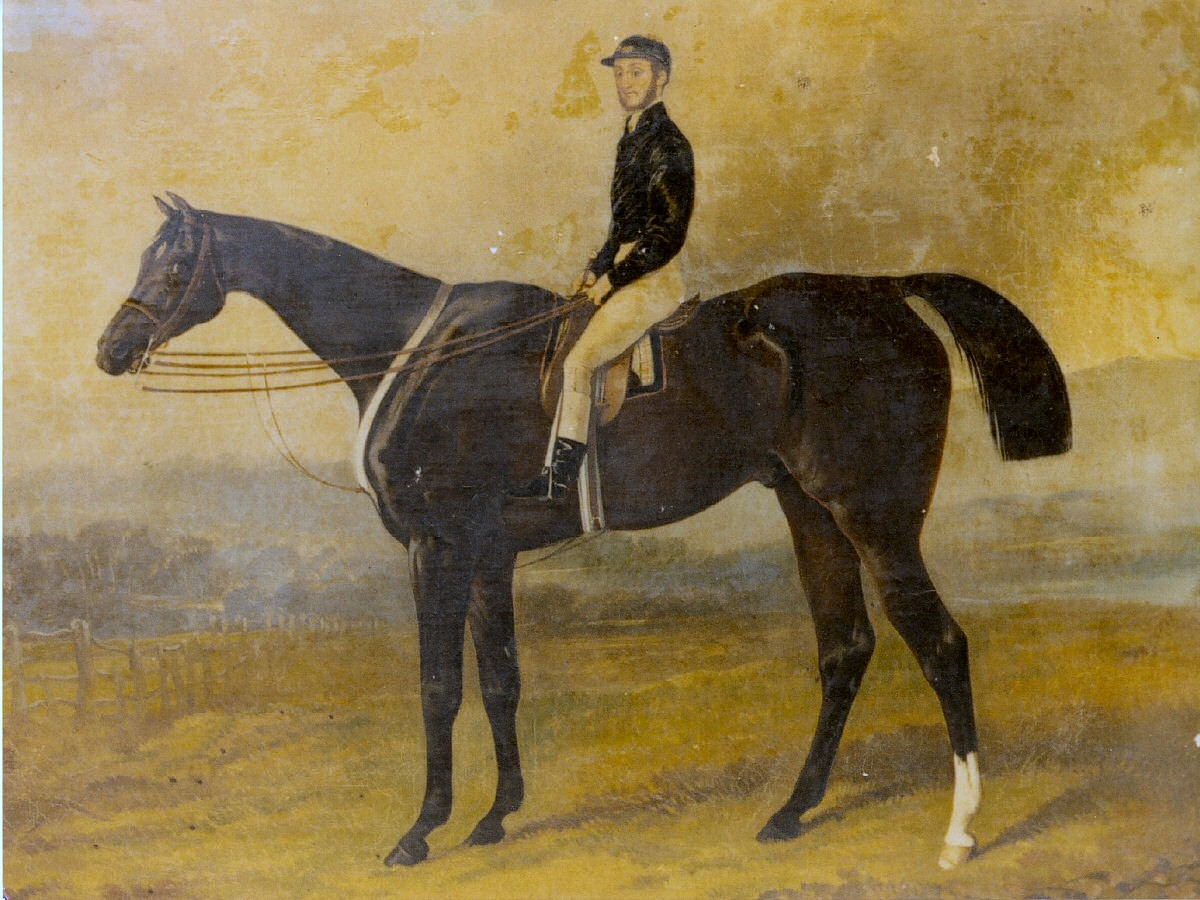
- ″Half Caste with C. Green up″ (anonymous but possibly after Henry Barraud who painted Half Caste in 1859)

Personal information
- Born: c. 1820 Upwell, Norfolk
- Died: 26 February 1874 (aged 53) Walsoken, Cambridgeshire
- Resting place: Walsoken, Cambridgeshire; 52.672492, 0.183218
- Occupation(s): Jockey and trainer
- Height: 5 ft 5 in (1.65 m)
- Weight: 9 st (57.15 kg)

Horse racing career
- Sport: Horse racing

Major racing wins
- As steeplechase jockey: Grand National (1850, 1859); Warwick Grand Annual Steeplechase (1859); As steeplechase trainer: Grand National (1871)

Significant horses
- Ridden: Abd-el-Kader (by Ishmael); Abd-el-Kader (by Scutari); Eastern Princess (flat); Half Caste; Trained (steeplechase): Abd-el-Kader (by Scutari); Agag; Benazet; Cortolvin; Half Caste; Jerry; Sepoy; Thalassius; The Lamb; Yaller Gal; Trained (flat): Eastern Princess; Nu

Chris Green (c. 1820–1874) was a leading English steeplechase rider and trainer who won two Aintree Grand Nationals as jockey (1850 on Abd-el-Kader and 1859 on Half Caste) and trained the winning horse in another, The Lamb in 1871.

He was active as a rider from around 1837 to around 1863, and as a trainer from the mid-1850s to about 1872, two years before his death. He interspersed his professional racing life with periods concentrating on his farming interests on the Norfolk–Cambridgeshire borders.

His full name was Christopher Green but throughout his professional life he was referred to as Chris or Cris Green.

== Early life ==
His exact date of birth is not known, but he was baptised on 16 July 1820 as Christopher Green to William and Mary Green at Upwell, close to Wisbech and the Isle of Ely in the Fenlands of the Norfolk/Cambridgeshire borders. There is nothing in later records to disagree with 1820 being his year of birth. His 1874 obituary writer, styling himself as 'The Sportsman', tells of him learning to ride at a very early age 'whipped in to his father' who hunted a pack of harriers across the 'enormous Fen drains'. He soon earned a name for the daring manner in which he rode.

== Early career – rider ==
Chris Green soon obtained his first 'place' on leaving home with Lord Berners but, according to his obituary writer, when he thought it was he that was entitled to the mount (and not George Edwards, the nominated jockey) of Phosphorus, the eventual but unfancied winner of the 1837 Derby, he threw up his engagement.

He then moved on to William Rowland Sandiford (Note: An interesting pen portrait, written by 'An Amateur' from London, as part of 'A Week In Norfolk', brings Colkirk, William Rowland Sandiford and Chris Green to life Apparently William Rowland Sandiford (c1805-1873) 'wiped out' his step-daughter's family's fortune by means of his pursuits.) 'who kept a small stud of flat racers and steeplechasers' at Colkirk House, Colkirk, Norfolk. Bailey's Magazine of Sports & Pastimes illustrates Green's work ethic with three rides in two days for William Rowland Sandiford at the Norfolk and Norwich Steeple Chases on 10 & 11 September 1839 on the 4yr-old bay colt Oliver Twist. A small biography when he hit the public consciousness ten years later mentions that 'in 1839-40 was successful with Thought, Corringham and Longwaist' and there are several race reports of 1840 that mention his wins on these horses. Indeed, one account of a Chase at Diss waxes quite lyrical over Green's handling of the race-winning heavyweight chestnut Thought - 'Mr Green was rider for Mr Sandiford, and Mr Turner of Carlton, was seen mounted on Modesty. It would be hard to find two better Steeple Chase Riders than them ... Green on Thought had a tremendous fall, by his horse swerving against a gate post; although much stunned he was up "as quick as Thought," and away went horse and rider at an increased speed ... The riding of Green was much admired, he is not only a good but a most fortunate rider, and has almost invariably ridden the winner, wherever he has appeared this season'.

As well as these mostly local races, Thought, ridden by Green, started to take to a wider stage. At the Waltham Abbey Steeple Chase on 9 April 1840 he came second to Jerry, the 1840 Grand National winner, ridden by Jem Mason in a duel that was a credit to both riders, even if the race itself was mismanaged. After this promising start to his career, though, the potted biography of 1850 goes on to say that Christopher Green's farming interests took precedence over his racing and he gave up professional horsemanship. He only 'took to the pigskin again' in 1849.

His return in 1849 was marked by a second and a first place at the same meeting on 2 April on Mr Abel's grey mares, Present and Novice, at Stallinghall, just outside Norwich (although Chris Green's name as rider does not appear in contemporary reports). Early 1850 was not so successful - riding Mr Briggs' bay gelding, Hope, he failed to finish both at Louth (on account of a severe fall) on 1 February and Lincoln on 21 February. On both occasions, a rider named Canavan was also unsuccessfully piloting a small bay gelding named Abd-el-Kader.

Another obituary of Green was written by this rider, now identified as the Irish rider Charlie Canavan (Note: The starting lists for the 1850 Grand National also show Canavan riding 'Mr. J.G. Murphy's The Oaks'. The 1879 book Irish Sport and Sportsmen identifies Abd-el-Kader, The Oaks, J.G. Murphy and Canavan as part of the 'Irish Brigade' at Aintree in 1850 and further states that it was Charlie Canavan who was a leading horseman of the time. J.G. Murphy is James George Murphy of The Grange, Summerhill, County Meath who died 1858.) in which fuller details of the Lincoln Steeple Chase and its consequences are given. Abd-el-Kader 'leaped on the wrong side of one of the flags soon after starting and was pulled up' and Hope 'might, nevertheless, have won had he not possessed the most wayward of tempers' and failed at the penultimate fence, as another writer said 'on account of the course being imperfectly flagged'. Chris Green had ridden well enough, though, to confirm to his Irish owner and trainer, Joseph Osborne (Note: Joseph Osborne (1810-1901) of Dardistown Castle, County Meath, was not only a very successful breeder and owner of racehorses but a journalist and author of such 'esteemed books' as ′The Horsebreeders' Handbook′, the fifth edition of which he published in his eighty-eighth year in 1898. Reportedly, his father, Henry Osborne, had taken a fancy to the near leader of the Shrewsbury coach and bought her on the spot for 50 guineas. After a successful steeplechasing career, one of English Lass' offspring by Ishmael was Abd-el-Kader.) that he was the rider for Abd-el-Kader in the Grand National in a few days time. (Note: As Charlie Canavan tells it, on the Friday evening after the Lincoln meet had ended, the whole party retired to the theatre and occupied the Stage Box where one of the party led a vigorous chorus of 'There's a Good Time Coming, Boys'. The train from Lincoln to Manchester on the following day happened to be too late to catch the last ordinary train to Liverpool; but a sport-loving train scheduler at Manchester ordered the horse-box, which also contained Mr. Elmore's British Yeoman, to be attached to the express train instead and also that on reaching Liverpool, it should be taken back to the Preston Road Station, within a mile of Aintree. Even so they didn't arrive until near midnight. Abd-el-Kader didn't look in the best condition the next day (he looked 'big') so it was resolved that Green would ride him for the first time to 'sweat' him. Asked his opinion on his return, Chris 'smiled in his quiet way', and said he had "never ridden his like before, and that if no accident befell him, he was sure to win".) He did indeed win, leading from the front, by about a length, in a record time of 9min 57.5sec 'taken by three watches', and Green had ridden the gelding masterfully: 'The judgment with which he steered Abd-el-Kader for this great event betokened an ″artiste″ of no little merit, for he rode throughout with indomitable resolution, steadying the little horse when necessary, and keeping him going in that part of the line where his superior jumping soon made the heavy weights tell.'

== Intermediate career – rider and trainer ==
Such a victory propelled him into a different league of steeplechases, horses and trainers. Christopher Green was granted a passport in 1850 which may well mean he was riding abroad. He rode, and won, often for 'Mr Carew' (Note: Charles Hallowell Hallowell Carew (1829–1872) was the eldest son of Captain Charles Hallowell Carew of Beddington Park. After a brief army career, he turned with a passion to the turf, financed by a 'splendid property and a large command of ready money'. He 'bought largely' and won the Grand National in 1852 as well as a few flat races. But his horses were not 'lucky' and they had 'an unhappy knack of running seconds'. But he was 'careless in money matters, easy prey to sharks' and his fortune 'melted away'. Beddington Park was sold and became an orphanage and he 'became a wreck of his former self' and died in Boulogne, France in 'almost actual poverty'.) and Ben Land snr. (Note: 'Old' Ben Land (c. 1815–1872) was another Norfolk farmer who became a professional jockey both on the flat and in steeplechases but found greater renown as a trainer of both. A 'jovial cheery man', 'popular and respected by so many people of all classes and degrees', he trained The Lamb for her first Grand National win and should really share the credit for her second – Green only took up her training at a relatively late stage. For many years his friend George Ede, the cricketer (riding as 'Mr Edwards'), rode his horses as a gentleman jockey and it was on one of his horses that he was killed at Aintree on 13 March 1870 aged just 36. Ben Land slit his own throat on Thursday 9 August 1872 in a ditch near his house at Kingswood, Surrey after a 'bad Goodwood' and a certain Lord not paying his debt for a horse, leaving him feeling very cheated. It wasn't a clean cut and Ben Land staggered home to linger on until his death on the Sunday morning.) and he is now mainly mentioned by the sporting press only when something out of the ordinary happened. (Note: At Grantham Steeple Chases on 19 March 1858 he won, against two Grand National winners, on Old Dog Tray but when reweighed was found to be underweight by a full stone (14 lb or 6.35 kg). Complaints that this was due to the incompetency of the judge at the original weighing went unheeded. On Saturday 13 November 1858 he was riding race favourite Abd-el-Kader (by Scutari, as bred by Lord Strathmore and now under the new ownership of John Gerard Leigh / Samuel Brisco Sheward). Abd-el-Kader, in the lead, jumped short at the bank jump opposite the stand and rolled completely over – 'Green being much shaken'.) For a while, though, Green had been wanting to set up a training establishment on his own account and so moved back to Littleport in the Isle of Ely (his father's birthplace) where 'he soon got the management of several steeple chase horses' but found 'it was easier to find stabling than a country to train over'. He soon made the acquaintance of Henry Jones of Aps (or Apes) Hall, Littleport which became a long-standing relationship of friendship rather than one of pure business. In the 1850s, Green and Jones, as co-owners, bought Tomyrus (foaled 1851) who had a successful flat and hurdles career. Prince Charlie, Camel, Hester, Avenger, Gownsman 'and other good horses' were all descended from Tomyrus and gave Jones fame and success.

Henry Jones also gave him the liberty to train his own stud over his grounds, and one of these was Half Caste (a horse owned by the team of John Gerard Leigh and Samuel Brisco Sheward). Other horses mentioned as being under his management were Old Dog Tray, Lady Hathaway, Abd-el-Kader (by Scutari, and so not the 1850 and 1851 National winner, although Green did ride him unsuccessfully in the 1858 Grand National), The Screw, Fox and Yeoman. Half Caste learnt 'his fine quick style of jumping' at Apes Hall and was prepared for the 1859 Grand National here and finally at Newmarket - Green relocated from Littleport to the premises (off Station Road) lately occupied by W. Smith in Newmarket. A month before the Aintree race, he was still taking in horses for training.

The 1859 Grand National was one of the closest in Aintree history. Half Caste, ridden by Green, started second favourite at 100:15 (nearly 7:1), and won 'a most exciting race' from the French horse Jean du Quesne by only a neck and Huntsman was only a length behind them. Green then went on to win twice at the Warwick Spring Meeting which led 'Touchstone', The Era columnist, to say that he 'was extremely fortunate in the steeple chases, having ridden the winners of the two in which the professionals were entitled to ride on Thursday, and as he has undoubtedly placed himself at the head of cross-country riders, having won on three out of the last four different horses he has mounted, only one of which was the favourite'. (Note: His three winning horses were Half Caste, Telegram and Spring (the only favourite) and the non-winner was Old Dog Tray at Derby.)

By 1860, his stud was very well respected with the Sporting Life highlighting Abd-el-Kader, Lord Oswald, Sepoy, Dutch Drops, Physician, King William and, especially, Miss Harkaway as representing 'the stable which is usually as formidable, in cross-country events, as John Day's in the Derby'. For the 1860 Grand National Green rode Sepoy for Captain White (1790–1866), but even though they were backed to 20:1 (largely on account of his celebrity), they were not mentioned in the race commentaries. Later in that year Abd-el-Kader had to be destroyed at the Upton-on-Severn Steeple Chases on 1 November – Green was severely shaken after the stricken horse rolled over him.

Chris Green had not severed his links with Henry Jones and nor had he severed his links with top-rank flat racing. He trained Eastern Princess (foaled 1858, a daughter of Tomyrus by Surplice) for Jones and rode her himself in The Oaks of June 1861 at Epsom, although not to any success. Green also entered her in the Berkshire Stakes at Abingdon in July 1861 where she was favourite (at 5 to 4 on). The race was a disaster as Eastern Princess 'overpowered her jockey' (H Bradley) and rushed to the front. Green actually 'ran up to his jockey on the far side... and gave him orders to "sit still and hold hard" but soon after it was clear her bolt was shot'. Eastern Princess had been favourite on the basis of her performance at Newmarket on 2 and 3 July where she had won the opening Handicap Plate of 50 Sovereigns easily (by three lengths) and the Town Plate of 50 Sovereigns by the same margin (and at a canter) the day after. The race report confirmed that Eastern Princess was trained by Green amongst his jumpers in Newmarket.

Later that year saw him training and riding Cockatoo (another Leigh/Sheward horse although run under the nom de course of Mr S Gooderham) in the 1861 Grand National (third favourite at 6:1), but it fell on the second circuit and led to Green being struck and again he was left 'much shaken'. He also trained Yaller Gal for the 1863 Grand National which was seen as being 'not the worst outsider in the world" and could cause a betting upset but in the event, ridden by Mr Dixon, she came third.

In 1863 Green started jumping his own horse, Reporter – a bay colt foaled 1859 in America by Lexington, dam by Glencoe. He actually rode Reporter for victory himself, on the horse's jumping debut, at the Great National Steeple Chase at Lincoln in October 1863 in a close and exciting duel with Socks, 'the victory being mainly attributable to the steady way in which he was ridden by Chris Green'. This seems to be the last winner that Green actually rode himself. Reporter almost immediately then won the Worcestershire Grand Annual Steeple Chase by ten lengths and Green was immediately offered 800 pounds – or guineas (£840) – after the race by rider-trainer John Nightingall of Epsom. Reporter had a solid record at first and he was put up for auction in October 1864 but did not sell. An injury to his foot around mid-1865 blighted his career. (Note: In December 1866 he was forced to go to court to recover £21, the value of the Town Plate won by Reporter at the Cambridge Races; the defendants claimed they had withheld the stakes because they had heard Green did not actually own Reporter and another action was pending. Green swore that he had owned the horse for three years and won the case. The Sporting Life's 'Special Commissioner' visited Chris Green's Newmarket stud in early March to inspect both Reporter and his stable-mate Cortolvin, both due to run in the 1866 Grand National by Alfred French, especially brought over from France, and Johnny Page respectively. The correspondent waxed lyrical over Cortolvin but described Reporter as 'although neatly framed, he has neither the power nor grand shape' of the other horse. Cortolvin came second and Reporter was unplaced in the National. The Sporting Life noted later in the year that although 'very successful as a steeple-chaser when he first came out', he 'did not jump in his old style' at Croydon and explained that about eighteen months before 'he fell when going out of his stable, and injured one of his knees so much that it was necessary to throw him up until this year'. In early January 1869 it was written that Reporter was again for sale but days later The Sportsman reported not only that Green's wife and family were all very ill, but that whilst jumping Reporter, the horse had landed on a stone and had severely injured his foot, 'so much so that it is very doubtful if he can be again used as a jumper' and indeed Reporter had died within the week of Tetanus.)

== Later career – trainer ==
By the mid-1860s, Chris Green was forging closer links with Lord Poulett, another major racehorse owner. It was reported in late 1865 that Poulett was building a private racecourse and training ground on Soberton Downs in Hampshire (more familiarly known in the Poulett context as Droxford) and had engaged Green as personal trainer. As it was, Green stayed in Newmarket at that stage (Ben Land sen. went to Droxford) but got immediate charge of all the Poulett horses including Cortolvin (who he then trained to be second in the 1866 Grand National). (Note: Cortolvin was then sold to the Duke of Hamilton and carried on training under Tom Brown - actually winning the Grand National in 1867)

Green's mid-1860s Newmarket premises were in Station Road, very near where it joins the High Street. They were obviously very extensive as they included a vast half-mile wide straw-bed circle which, in hard frosts, other trainers (Blanton, Godding and J Wood are mentioned) he allowed to use. But Green's Newmarket premises were put up for sale at the White Hart Inn on the 13 February 1868 by auctioneer Ebenezer Feist and presumably he, as a quarterly tenant, was obliged to move to other premises in Newmarket at that point. Further details of the property are given though – a dwelling house with enclosed court yard, stalls and loose boxes for sixteen horses, hay, corn and straw chambers, carriage houses and an ample supply of spring water, within a short distance of the railway station.

Two months later, Green was sending four horses up to the 1868 Grand National (Thalassius, Archimedes, Brick and Daisy) but only Daisy and Thalassius actually ran and neither was placed. The winner was The Lamb, trained by Ben Land snr. for Lord Poulett.

1869 started badly when his horse Reporter cut his foot badly on a stone – the wound turned septic and Reporter died a week later of 'lockjaw' (tetanus). Only one of his horses started the 1869 Grand National, Guy of Warwick, and he disgraced himself by refusing at the second fence and exiting the course. The rest of the year was very quiet as well and Green was realising that 'however fit the [Newmarket] Heath might be to train horses for the flat, there is no rough-and-ready country sufficiently near the metropolis of the Turf to keep steeple chasers au fait to their business'. Christopher Green retired back to his farming interests.

Ben Land snr., private trainer to Lord Poulett at Droxford, had decided to retire in 1870, and Chris Green was persuaded to take his place in Hampshire in September 1870 where he took charge of such horses as Benazet, Cortolvin and The Lamb. He was given the task of preparing The Lamb, a little iron grey Irish horse, for a second Grand National win and during the winter 'Lord Poulett and his party were exceedingly sanguine of success, and his Lordship caused a private circular to be distributed among his friends telling them to back The Lamb to win'. For the race itself, The Lamb, unseen in public for exactly two years, was paraded by Ben Land jun. and 'was greeted with a buzz of admiration, aroused by his beautiful appearance and condition... No horse in the world could have looked better than The Lamb did'. This testament to Green's work continued in the race as The Lamb kept ahead of the pursuing horses to finally win by a couple of lengths in 'a desperately exciting finish'.

It is not known exactly when he gave up his appointment at Droxford, but it has been stated that he 'retired from public life' to reside 'at Wisbech' either at the end of 1871 or upon the death of his father (21 April 1872).

== Judgement by his peers ==
His 1874 obituary writers summarise his record thus... 'As a jockey Chris Green was one of the best and boldest horsemen of any time' and 'As a cross-country jockey he had few equals, for to the most indomitable pluck he added rare judgment, never being taken aback in a difficulty; he had a firm and at the same time elegant seat, and the finest hands. It mattered not what kind of horse he was put on, for he was equally at home on the puller as on the slug.'

Praise for him as a trainer was slightly more muted, but, after the 1871 Grand National victory with The Lamb, a correspondent did comment on him in the following terms: 'Chris Green has not had charge of Lord Poulett's horses more than a twelvemonth, and it is something in the trainer's favour that he was able to win a Grand National on the first time of asking'.

== Personal life ==
Christopher Green married Rebecca Bettinson at All Saints, Walsoken, Norfolk, on 19 September 1854. He was aged 34 and she was ten years younger than he

She was the second child of Thomas Bettinson, a Walsoken farmer of 190 acres, and his wife Hannah. Green's father, William, farmed 250 acres at Outwell, six miles from Walsoken.

Christopher and Rebecca Green had six known children (two of whom died in infancy):

1. William Warth Green - born Q2 1856 Ely area, Cambridgeshire, baptised Littleport, Cambridgeshire on 8 July 1856
2. Tom Bettinson Green - born Q3 1857 Ely area, Cambridgeshire, baptised Littleport, Cambridgeshire on 24 July 1857, died Q1 1858 Ely area, Cambridgeshire
3. Christopher Green - born Q3 1858 Ely area, Cambridgeshire, baptised Littleport, Cambridgeshire 1858, died Q2 1859 Newmarket area, Cambridgeshire
4. Rebecca Green - born Q1 1860 Newmarket area, Cambridgeshire, baptised Woodditton, Cambridgeshire on 1 June 1860
5. Christopher Green - born Q4 1861 Newmarket area, Cambridgeshire, baptised St Mary, Newmarket, Cambridgeshire on 6 November 1861
6. Mary Hannah Green - born Q4 1862 Newmarket area, Cambridgeshire

At the same time as his horse, Reporter, was dying in early 1869, it was also reported that his wife and family were 'very ill' but no further details were given. So after an unsuccessful Grand National, Green retired to Walsoken to his farming interests. Soon, though, he was coaxed back to training with Lord Poulett in Hampshire in 1870, taking his family with him. He won the 1871 Grand National but was soon back with his family at Walsoken - sources disagree whether this was in late 1871 or April 1872 when his father died.

The life of a gentleman farmer was brought to an abrupt end by the death of his wife, Rebecca, in late 1873, aged just 43. According to the Churchwarden of All Saints, Peter Wadlow, she was buried in the parish graveyard on 22 December 1873. Green did not long survive her and he died two months later on 26 February 1874. The Walsoken parish burial register does not seem to list his burial, but his obituary states that he was laid to rest alongside his wife. The graveyard was closed and largely cleared of monuments in 1971 and so his grave cannot now be pinpointed.

Green did leave a valid will, but his executors had either died or were unwilling to act. The probate calendar shows that his brother, James William Green of Upwell, Norfolk, acted as administrator and was also now ward to the four young orphans. He left an estate valued at under £200.

== Depictions ==
An evocative description exists in words from 1867: ″Look at the dapper little fellow, how neatly he sits on the back of the old American horse, Reporter. Notice the jerry-hat, the open but determined, never-say-die, countenance, the polished boots, the burnished spurs, the tight-fitting breeches, the long waistcoat, creaseless coat, and general ′get-up′ of that wiry-looking, ten-stone, five-feet-five specimen of humanity, and tell me if he is a ′character′ when once seen that will never be forgotten.″ Charlie Canavan differs on one point - he states his weight 'when at man's age' did not exceed 9 stone (126 lb or 57 kg).

In 1850 ′a correct likeness′ of Chris Green with Abd-el-Kader was commissioned by Joseph Osborne and painted by Henry Thomas Davis. An engraving of this (to match one already made of Raby) was advertised and prints were to be sold for one guinea (21 shillings or £1.05) each through Mr John Moore, publisher and bookmaker.

Half Caste, the 1859 Grand National winner, was painted by Henry Barraud later that year. No publicly available image of this painting has been found but a contemporary image of Half Caste with Green up is held by one of Christopher Green's descendants and this may be based on this. The original was sold by Sotheby's, London on 18 July 1979.

The very next Sotheby's lot comprised another Henry Barraud painting, entitled "Rebecca Green with her son William on a pony". No publicly available image of this painting of Green's wife Rebecca, and his eldest son William Warth Green, has been found either. (Note: The subject of this painting was actually recorded in 1866 in the sporting press: 'Chris has quite a curiosity in the pony line, standing only 30in. [0.76 metres] high, and he carries each of the children (boys and girls ranging from three to eight years) in fine style round the drawing room table, with an occasional jump over a chair.)
