= 1859 Grand National =

English steeplechase horse race

- Grand National
- Location: Aintree
- Date: 2 March 1859
- Winning horse: (England) Half Caste
- Starting price: 7/1
- Jockey: Chris Green
- Trainer: Chris Green
- Owner: Mr Willoughby
- Conditions: Good

The 1859 Grand National was the 21st renewal of the Grand National horse race that took place at Aintree near Liverpool, England, on 2 March 1859.

== The Course ==
Attempts were made to sabotage the course this year by unruly spectators wishing to make the fences less of a test. On hearing that many of the fences had been broken down by spectators, attempts were made to send out men to rebuild them, which were met in some areas by spectators blocking their path to the fence. Jockeys, returning after the race reported their mounts having to jump spectators on occasion, so close to the fences were the crowds.

First circuit: Starting from the field used every year since 1851, This area had several trees nearby and it was reported that much amusement was found watching the acrobatics of spectators climbing for a better view Fence 1 {15} Bank, Fence 2 {16} described this year as a hedge and ditch, Fence 3 {17} Post and Rails, Fence 4 {18} Rails and ditch, Fence 5 {19} Becher's Brook, Fence 6 {20} had been described in previous years as a bank but this year was Rails and a ditch, Fence 7 {21} Also formerly a bank but now a post and rails Fence 8 {22} Canal side turn bank, Fence 9 {23} Valentine's Brook, Fence 10 {24} Ditch and quickset, Fence 11 {25} Post and rails, Fence 12 {26} Stump hedge and ditch.

The runners then turned at the first opportunity on re-entering the racecourse and made towards the fences in front of the stands. Fence 13 Gorsed hurdle, Fence 14 Made brook, appears to have been increased in width from 13' 6" to 15'.

Second circuit: The runners then turned away from the Grandstands again and crossed Proceed's lane, into the a field that was formerly the wheat piece in previous years before following the same circuit until reaching the racecourse again. This time the runners continued to the wider extreme of the course before turning to run up the straight in front of the stands where Fence 27 the Distance hurdle had to be jumped.

The runners then bypassed the Gorsed Hurdle and Made brook inside before reaching the winning post in front of the Main Stand.

== Build up and leading contenders ==
As in most years of this decade, the poor quality of runners and low weights put the sport at a very low ebb. The press speculated that the Crimean War and Indian Mutiny had starved the sport of both good hunter chasers and good hunting men to ride them while professional jockeys struggled to make the low weights required in many races. The result was a field yet again made up mostly of flat race rejects, some of whom had never taken part in a steeplechase before. Again leaving the public with very little to go on in picking a selection

Westminster, fourth two years ago, was the long time favourite, but went wrong the day before the race and was withdrawn along with Knight Of The Shire, Mahratta and Tease to leave twenty runners.

The Brewer was installed as favourite at 100/30 and had been a firmer price on the day of the race until the public saw him in the paddock looking rough in his coat. Jockey, Walter White, having his sixth mount in the race was given a hint of a difficult day when the horse swerved away from the preparatory hurdle.

Half Caste was the 7/1 second favourite despite having only run once in a chase, the previous November when he fell. However, his partner, Chris Green had wo the race nine years earlier.

Jealousy at 10/1 summed up the poor quality of the field as the mare had injured herself in an over reach a few days earlier and was clearly not fully fit to run. Joe Kendall took the ride as his third in the race having completed the course once.

Jean Du Quesne was returning for a third attempt at the race at 10/1 having completed the course down the field on his two previous attempts. The French entries' English trainer, Harry Lamplugh had partnered the horse in both previous runs and was again in the saddle for his sixth National. The horse looked in peak condition when appearing for the preliminaries.

The Huntsman was at 100/8 and the biggest surprise was that he was not sent off as favourite after being seen as the perfect example of a chaser among a field of flat race rejects. Ben Lan Jnr took the mount as his second ride in the race and freed of the burden of partnering the favourite, as he had done the previous year.

Notable among the preliminaries was that Jealousy and two other runners, Claudius, providing a record nineteenth and final ride in the race for Tom Olliver and last years runner up Weathercock appeared barely fit to take part at all, the former, as described clearly carrying the effects of an injury while the other two were heavily bandaged. Defending champion, Little Charley was another in the field who did not appear right, being short in his stride.

== The race ==
The runners were sent off at the second attempt with The Brewer pleasing the crowd by showing early over the first fence with Xanthus, the pair continuing to set the pace over an incident free opening down to Becher's for the first time. The pre race fears for the grey, Claudius were instantly realised as Tom Olliver took the horse wide, away from the rest of the field and was clearly travelling at a very slow pace.

All twenty cleared Bechers safely before the one eyed Spring was unsighted at the next and came down on his rider, Nightingall, while the hopes of favourite backers ended at the post and rails before the Canal Turn when The Brewer fell and was joined by Gibraltar. Both were rapidly remounted, though Walter White had to hastily get the favourite's bridle back on.

Xanthus continued to set the pace down the Canal side with The Gipsy King and Flatcatcher in close attendance while Anatis, Half Caste and Jean Du Quesne were prominent. However, the concerns for the fitness of Weathercock were realised when the horse was pulled up lame upon reaching the Canal Lane, Enoch, using the lane as a shortcut to the stables. The Gipsy King also rapidly lost ground here and though his fate isn't clear, it's probable something went wrong with the horse and he was pulled up.

Xanthus and Flatcatcher led the field past the stands and over the Gorsed hurdle and Made brook with a lead of around four lengths to Anatis, Jean Du Quesne, Half Caste, Ace Of Hearts, Escape, Ghika, The Huntsman, Midge, Orkousta, Border Chief, Jealousy and Little Charley. Claudius was continuing tailed off, along with the remounted Gibraltarand finally The Brewer who, despite being so far behind, still attracted great encouragement from the crowd, only to fall at the water and lay prone on top of his rider. The horse and White were helped to their feet and the bridle again properly fitted before the rider ignored the encouragement to continue the chase.

Half Caste briefly moved up to lead the runners round the starting turn before easing to let Xanthus take it up again on the run down to Becher's for the second time. Yet again this part of the course was relatively incident free before the leader came down heavily at the post and rails after the brook, leaving Half Caste and Flatcatcher in front. At the next fence, Half Caste struck the rail hard, dislodging it into the path of Flatcatcher who was brought down to be joined moments later by Ace Of Hearts who may have collided with Holmes as he tried to remount. The already tailed off Gibraltar made the distinction of falling at the same fence on both circuits, this time deciding not to continue.

His two nearest rivals having both departed the contest, Half Caste led Anatis over the Canal turn with Jean Du Quesne, The Huntsman, Escape, Ghika and Midge and Orkousta with Border Chief, Jealousy and Little Charley adrift.

Jean Du Quesne moved up to challenge Half Caste along the Canalside as Anatis weakened and the race lay between these two, The Huntsman and Midge turning for home.

Half Caste and Jean Du Quesne took the final hurdle together, though both going for opposite sides of the obstacle while The Huntsman jumped poorly, losing a vital and costly length on the two leaders with Midge not able to mount a challenge.

In one of the closest finishes in the National Half Caste prevailed by a short neck with The Huntsman a length down in third, Midge three lengths back in fourth and a further six lengths to fifth placed Anatis who narrowly edged out Orkousta after the mare had slipped and almost fallen at the home turn. Ghika, Escape, the remounted Ace Of Hearts, Little Charley and Jealousy all came home at regular intervals while Border Chief, Flatcatcher Gibraltar and Claudius were all walked in, having not completed the course.

== Finishing Order ==
Position	Name	Jockey	Handicap (st-lb)	SP	Distance	Colours
Winner	Half Caste	Chris Green	9-7	7/1	10 mins 2 secs	Black, yellow cap tassle
Second	Jean Du Quesne	Harry Lamplugh	9-9	10-1	Short Neck	White, red piping and black cap
Third	The Huntsman	Ben Land	11-2	100-8	1 Length	Blue, yellow sleeves and black cap
Fourth	Midge	Dan Meaney	9-4	33-1	3 Lengths	
Fifth	Anatis	Tommy Pickernell {Rode as Mr Thomas}	9-4	25-1	6 Lengths	Purple, orange sleeves, black cap
Sitxh	Orkousta	George Stevens	9-0	33-1	Close up	Blue and yellow stripes, black cap
Seventh	Ghika	Charles Boyce	9-10	20-1		Brown, light blue cap
Eighth	Escape	Tom Donaldson	10-5	20-1		Yellow, black cap
Ninth {Remounted}	Ace of Hearts	Johnny Ryan	9-12	25-1		Light blue, black cap
Tenth	Little Charley	T.J. Burrowes	10-11	14-1		Black, white sleeves and cap
Eleventh and last	Jealousy	Joe Kendall	9-8	10-1		
Fence 27 {Distance Hurdle}	Border Chief	Watling	9-10	50-1	Tailed off early, walked in	Orange, black sleeves and cap
Fence 22 {Canal Turn}	Flatcatcher	Holmes	8-12	50-1	Brought Down	Red, white cap
Fence 21 {Post and Rails}	Xanthus	Gus Balchin	10-7	50-1	Fell	White, blue armbands, red cap
Fence 13 {Gorsed Hurdle}	The Gipsy King	Edmunds	9-0	50-1	Pulled Up entering the racecourse	
Fence 13 {Gorsed Hurdle}	Weathercock	E. Enoch	10-13	33-1	Pulled Up at the Canal lane, lame	Yellow and blue stripes, black cap
Fence 7 {Post and Rails}	Gibraltar	Armstrong	9-0	50-1	Remounted Fell again {21} same fence, walked in	White, red cap
Fence 7 {Post and Rails}	The Brewer	Walter White	9-10	100-30 Fav	Fell, Remounted, tailed off, fell again {14}	
Fence 6 {Post and Rails}	Spring	John Nightingall	8-7	40-1	Fell	Pink, black sleeves and cap
Fence 1 {Bank}	Claudius	Tom Olliver	10-0	50-1	Tailed off, Pulled up 2nd circuit and walked in	Indigo

== Aftermath ==
The lack of concern expressed in the press at the lack of fitness of at least three of the runners wasn't in keeping with the level of concern usually expressed over the welfare of the horses in previous years.

One of the three, Jealousy, proved how good she was when fir the following weekend, in winning the Doncaster Grand National.

Although the falls of Spring, The Brewer and Flatcatcher suggested danger to their riders, none were reported as being seriously injured.

This was Tom Olliver's final appearance as a rider in the race, having won it a record three times in a record nineteen attempts.
