= Walsoken =

Civil parish in Norfolk, England

Coordinates: 52.67193°N 0.18939°E

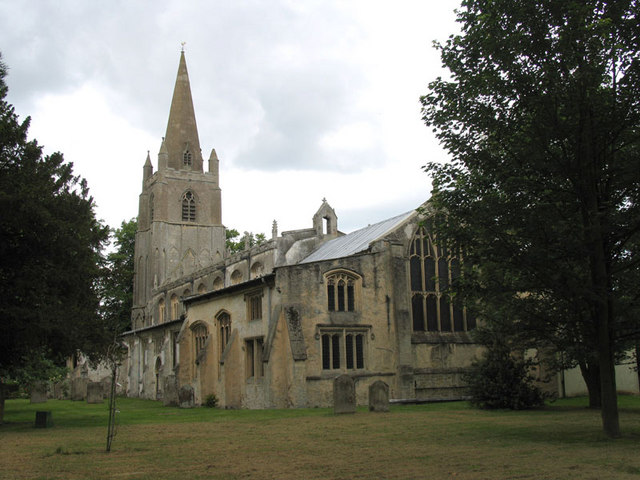
- All Saints’ Church, Walsoken, Norfolk

- Location within Norfolk
- Area: 12.57 km^{2} (4.85 sq mi)
- Population: 1,489 (parish, 2011 census)
  - Density: 118/km^{2} (310/sq mi)
- OS grid reference: TF4710
  - London: 103 miles (166 km)
- Civil parish: Walsoken
- District: King's Lynn and West Norfolk
- Shire county: Norfolk
- Region: East
- Country: England
- Sovereign state: United Kingdom
- Post town: WISBECH
- Postcode district: PE13, PE14
- Dialling code: 01945
- Police: Norfolk
- Fire: Norfolk
- Ambulance: East of England
- UK Parliament: South West Norfolk

Walsoken is a settlement and civil parish in Norfolk, England, which is conjoined as a suburb at the northeast of the town of Wisbech, Isle of Ely, Cambridgeshire.

The parish of Walsoken in the 2001 census, had a population of 1,484 rising slightly to 1,489 at the 2011 census. For the purposes of local government, the parish falls within the district of King's Lynn and West Norfolk. The council is Walsoken Parish Council.

== History ==
The name Walsoken is thought to originate from the Old English meaning the district under particular jurisdiction by the wall which refers to the villages proximity to a Roman sea wall or defence.

=== Roman settlement ===
Archaeological evidence has found that much of the land of Walsoken of pre-Roman occupation was completely submerged beneath the Iron Age silts. As such, very little early prehistoric archaeology has been recorded. It is thought that some dry land existed within the parish in the Bronze Age as several artefacts from that time period were uncovered in the 19th century. There has been a lot more archaeological evidence found to attest to Roman occupation in the parish, including a dispersed hoard of 300 to 400 Roman coins, mostly of Postumus, but including examples minted by Gallienus and the boy-Emperor Hostilian, which were found via metal detecting in the 1980s.

=== Medieval period ===
Ailwin (or Aethelwine), earl of East Anglia, gave 5 hides at Walsoken to Ramsey Abbey. The principal manor of Walsoken was Popenhoe, which originally belonged to Ramsey Abbey.

The settlement's population, land ownership and productive resources were detailed in its entry in the Domesday Book of 1086. In the great book Walsoken is recorded by the name 'Walsocam', which was held by the Benedictine Order based at Ramsey Abbey before and after 1066. The survey also records the presence of a fishery.

In 1286 Desiderata grand-daughter of Sir Stephen de Maresco, Lord of Newton, Walsoken and Tidd St Giles married Sir Roger de Colvile.

There was a Guild of the Assumption of our Lady, a Guild of St Thomas the Martyr, a Guild of the Nativity of our Lady, a Guild of St John and a Guild of the Trinity, according to the will of Thomas Honiter (1513).

=== 18th century ===
In 1788 Henry Sell (17), an apprentice farrier, was convicted and executed at THETFORD for the murder, at Walsoken, of Elizabeth Clark, his master's wife. After sentencing he confessed to putting arsenic into the tea-water, also poisoning his master William Clark who survived. The Bell Inn, Kirkgate Street was already in operation by 1794, it was used for inquests in both the 19th and 20th centuries.

=== 19th century ===
The Black Boy Inn (aka The Black Boy Low) Lynn Road, already an old building, was painted by Alexander Peckover, 1st Baron Peckover in 1847. It was demolished to be replaced by The Locomotive. In 1883 another former licensed premises, The Black Horse, Walsoken Road (now Norwich Road), was opened as a coffee house. Nearby were the Bridge Inn, The Royal Exchange, Marshland Arms and George the IVth. In 1872 the Walsoken Working Men's Institute was formed and met at the Lecture Hall, New Walsoken.

=== 20th century ===
In 1940 Mr and Mrs C.R. Miller, of Black Bear Lane, received the King's Bounty of three Guineas for the birth of their triplets.

=== Amalgamation with Wisbech ===
The county boundary between Norfolk and the Isle of Ely based on the old course of the Welle Stream through the built-up area, dividing up roads and streets haphazardly. Wisbech and a large part of Walsoken, containing the larger part of the population, were amalgamated in April 1934 – a stone boundary marker stone in Wisbech Park records the event and bears the names - Joseph Smith, Mayor of Wisbech and Thomas Burling, Warden of Walsoken. Six other boundary markers were also put in place. Part of the ecclesiastical parish was transferred to the Isle of Ely from Norfolk. As a result the church remains in Norfolk and the village hall, schools, pubs and most shops are now in the New Walsoken part of Wisbech.

== 21st century ==
The Bell P.H. was demolished and redeveloped for housing, leaving only the Three Tuns, Black Bear and Locomotive public houses in operation, although these are now located in Wisbech.

== Geography ==
The village and parish of Walsoken is situated in the west of Norfolk on the border with Cambridgeshire – much of the original village now lies in Cambridgeshire but All Saints Church lies in Norfolk.

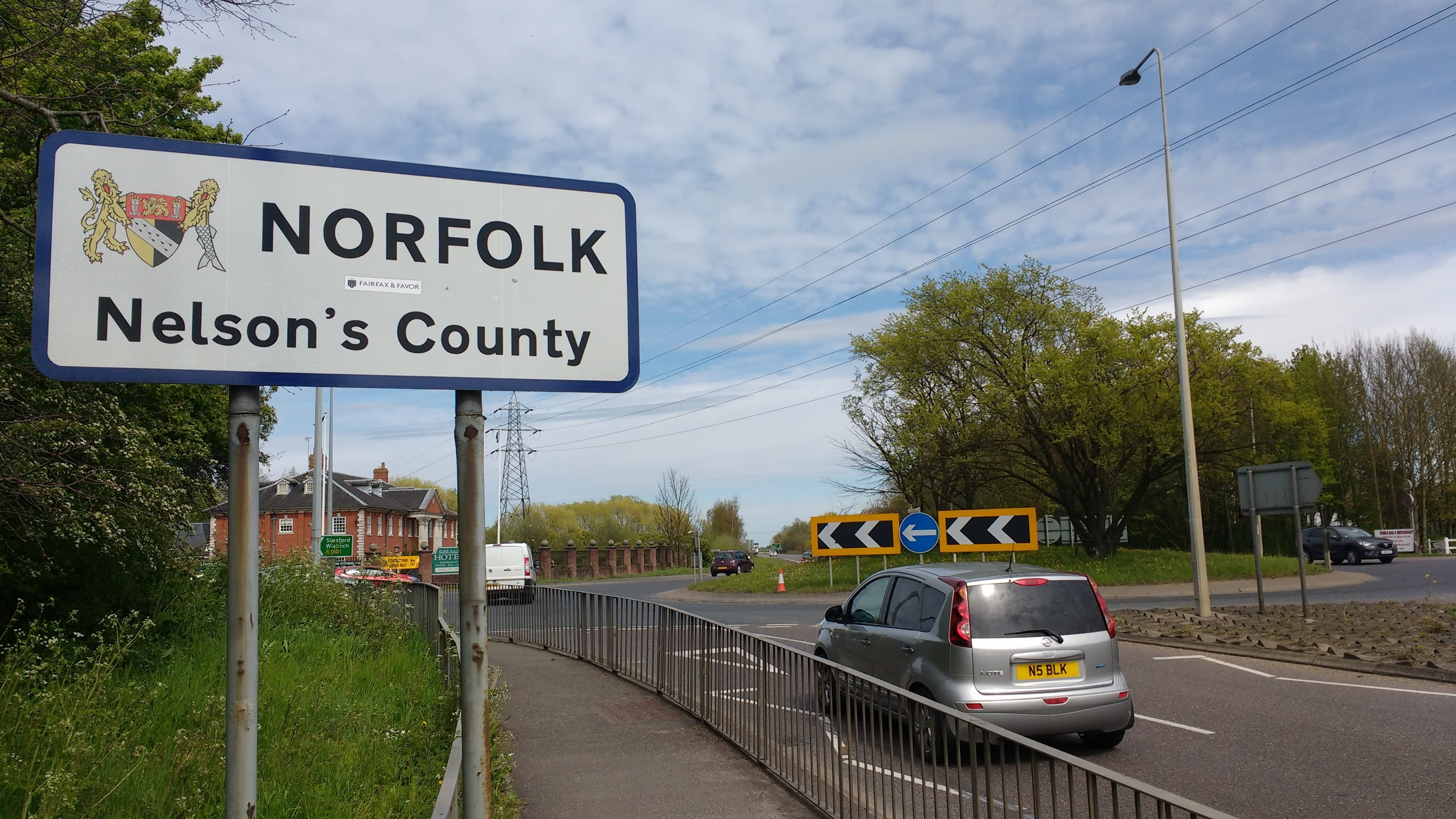
Entrance to Norfolk at Walsoken, Wisbech on the Cambridgeshire and Norfolk County boundary.

The village is a suburb of the fenland town of Wisbech and its ancient character and historic core have been surrounded by modern housing. The parish is south of West Walton, north of Emneth and west of Marshland St James.

Walsoken is approximately 47 miles (80 km) west-north-west of Norwich, 11 miles (20 km) west-south-west of King's Lynn and 80 miles (100 km) north of London. The suburb and parish is 1 mile (1.6 km) east-north-east of the centre of Wisbech. Walsoken is to the east of the B198 which was the old A47 renumbered in 1984 with the opening of the Wisbech bypass.

The nearest railway station is at Downham Market for the Fen Line which runs between King's Lynn and Cambridge. The nearest airport is Norwich International Airport.

== Flora and Fauna ==
Early records include one to "Sleeply Nightshade" by John Gerard (c.1545–1612), English herbalist, who wrote: "It groweth very plentifully in Holland, Lincolnshire and in the Isle of Ely at a place called Walsoken neere unto Wisbitch. "This kinde of nightshade causeth sleep, trouble the mind and bringeth madness if a few of the berries be inwardly taken, but if more be given they also kill and bring present death.

== Landmarks ==
=== All Saints’ Parish Church ===
All Saints' Church in Walsoken is a Grade I listed building, and consists of a nave with south and north aisles, a chancel with south and north chapels, and a south porch. The nave and chancel are both late Norman and date from c.1146. Above the chancel arch is a 15th-century carving of King David with harp. This church is crowned by a prominent west tower with four turrets and a spire which dates from the medieval period. To the base of the tower is the rounded Norman west doorway. The interior of the church has massive Norman arcades which are rich with zigzag moulding decoration. An arch in the chancel is supported on carved banded shafts. On one side is the 15th-century doorway to the old rood loft. The nave roof has painted angels and other figures in delicately canopied niches. There are 15th-century screens in both aisles, one with most intricate tracery, stalls with carved heads, battered figures on old benches, and over the tower arch two paintings of the judgement of Solomon with a statue of a king enthroned between them. The Seven Sacraments font is 400 years plus old. This pre-Reformation font is decorated with sculptures of the crucifixion and seven sacraments (these are; Baptism, Confession, Confirmation, Last Rites, Mass, Matrimony and Ordination), plus eight saints under rich canopies (these are; Catherine, Paul, John the Baptist, Mary of Magdala, Stephen, Margaret, Peter, and Dorothea), and round the base this inscription to those friends of the church who gave it: "Remember the souls of S. Honyter and Margaret his wife, and John Benforth, Chaplain 1544".

A portrait of Charles I on a panel found under the lead of the roof of the church in 1858 was donated to Wisbech & Fenland Museum in 1871. One child baptised at this font grew up to be Archbishop of Canterbury. He was the Rector's boy, Thomas Herring, who became archbishop in 1747, and a little while before he died put a tablet in the chancel here "in grateful memory of his excellent parents". He was a man of immense enthusiasm and full of generosity. There are several later window insertions throughout. The church's bell tower has six bells made by Thomas Osborn in Downham Market in 1795. Originally the bells were hung in a frame adjacent to the louvres in the tower. The bells were first rung on 26 January 1796 by the Societies of Downham and Magdalen Ringers. The Tenor weighing 15 cwt is in the key F-Sharp. The bells were restored and re-hung in 1901 by the children of Richard Young, M.P. for Cambridgeshire, and further work was undertaken in 1956 when the bells were re-hung in a lower position in the tower in an eight-bell metal frame. This was to allow for the future provision of two additional bells, which has not to date been achieved.

=== Church gallery ===
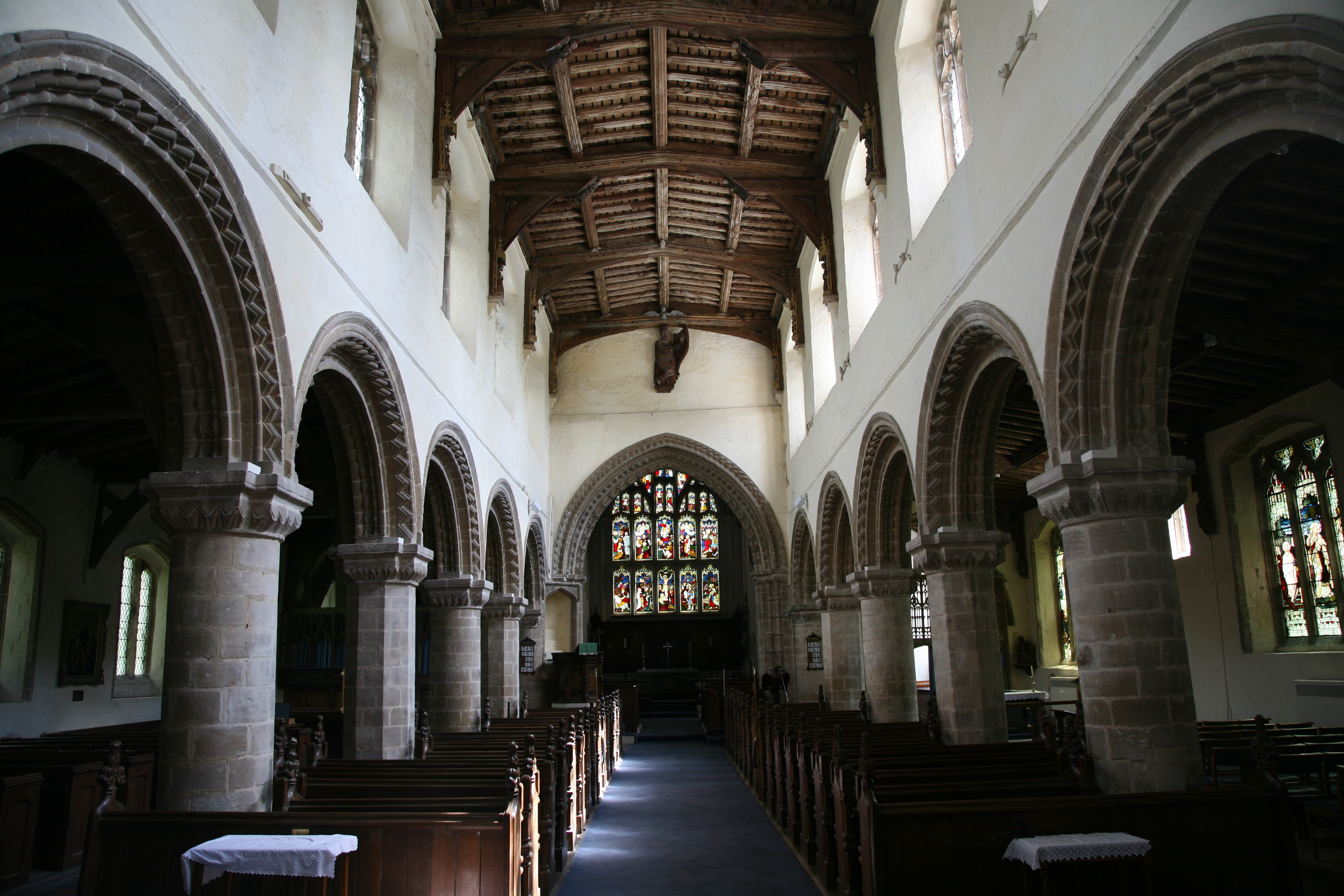
The arch chancel supported on carved banded shafts

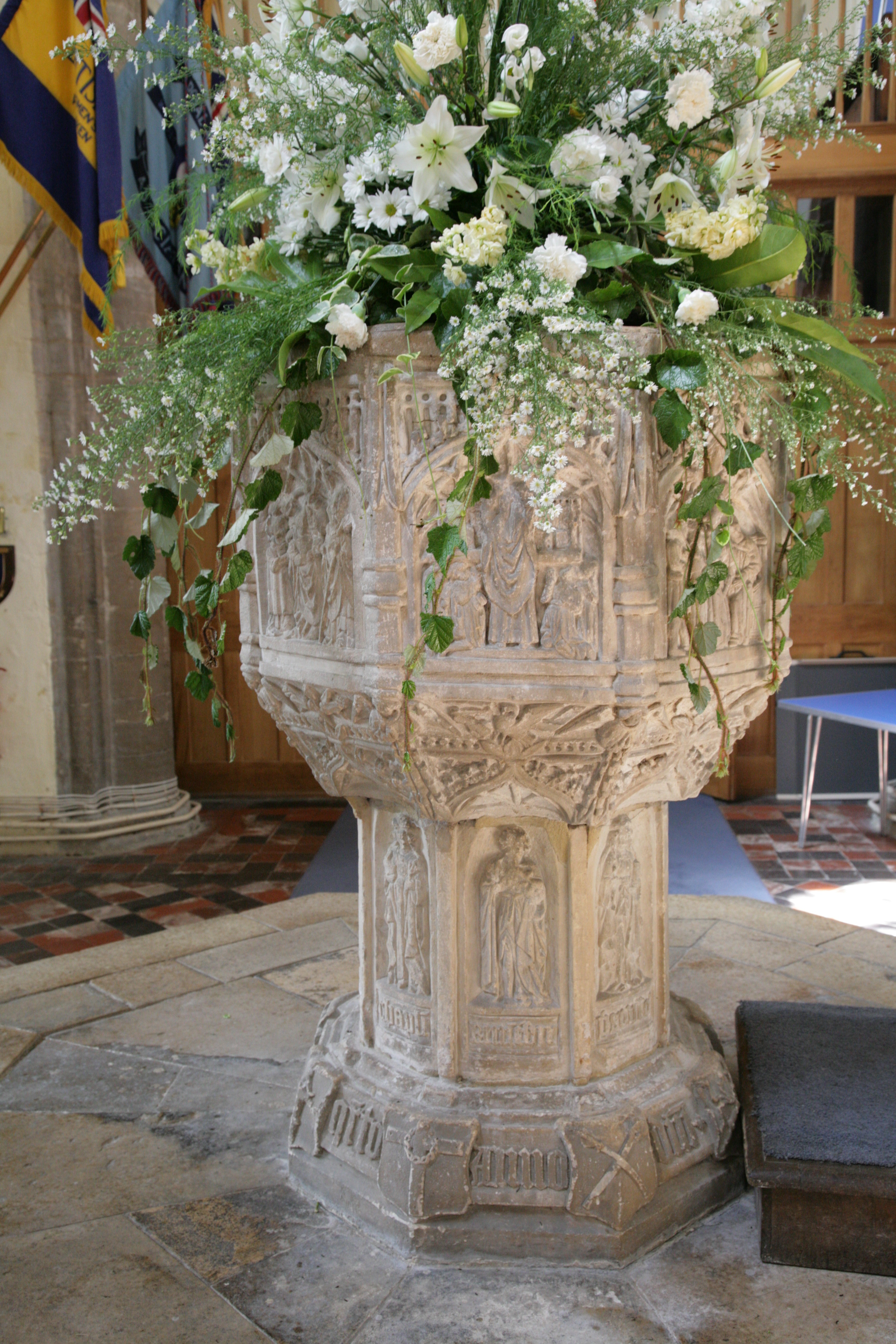
The 400-year-old Seven Sacraments font

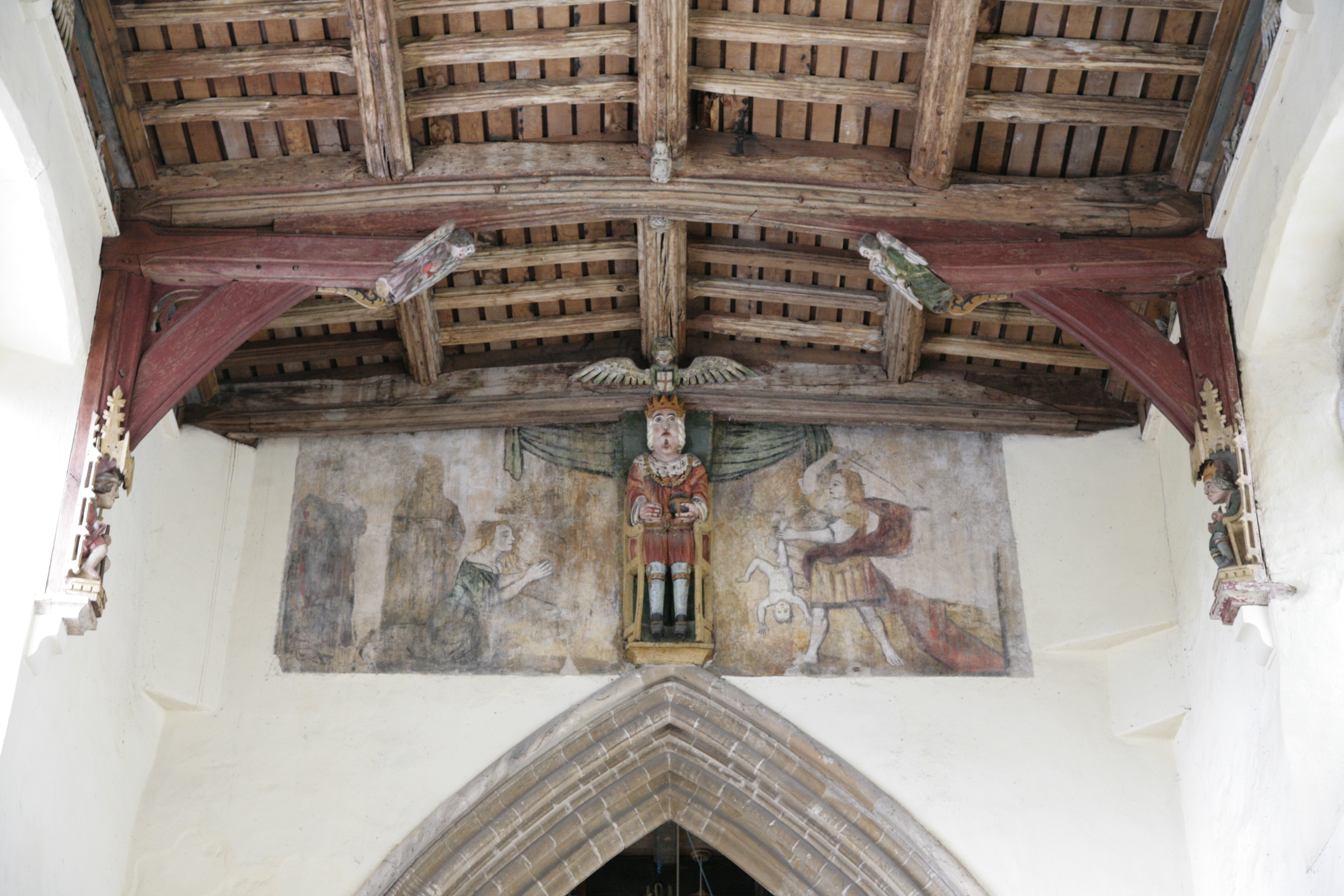
The timber nave roof with painted angels and other figures

=== War memorial ===
The war memorial for the two World Wars is located in the grounds of All Saints’ Church.

=== Walsoken Cemetery ===
Within the parish and Norfolk boundary and abutting the church yard is Fenland District Council's Walsoken cemetery.

== Notable people ==
Names are in birth order. Data are from the subject's Wikipedia article except where referenced.

- Thomas Herring M.A., (1693-1757) Archbishop of Canterbury from 1747 to 1757. Born in Walsoken and died 23 March 1757. Attended Wisbech Grammar School and Jesus College, Cambridge
- Sheriff Richard Young (MP), DL JP, (1809 – 15 October 1871) was a British Liberal politician, merchant and shipowner.
- Christopher Green, (1820-1874) was a famous steeple chase jockey and trainer. Twice winner of the Grand National.
- Henry Leslie, (1830–1881) was an actor and playwright.
- Robert Goodale, (1840–1885) was executed in Norwich Castle in December 1885 for the murder of his wife Bathsheba, on 15 September 1885. To the horror of all present, the hanging resulted in the decapitation of the condemned prisoner.

== The barque Walsoken ==
This boat owned by local shipowner Richard Young was named Walsoken.

== Sport ==
A short-lived greyhound racing track called the Wheatley Bank Sports Stadium, existed between 1939 and 1948. The racing was independent (not affiliated to the sports governing body the National Greyhound Racing Club) and was known as a flapping track, which was the nickname given to independent tracks. The track on Lynn Road could only accommodate 500 spectators and is reported to have reopened on 10 July 1948 meaning it had closed at some stage after 1939. Races were over 350 yards and meetings were held three times per week – on Mondays, Wednesdays and Saturdays. It was also used for Speedway.

Walsoken Pride was a champion chestnut mare owned and shown by Robert Baxter. The horse dropped dead at a horse show in Wisbech in 1922. The body was buried upright in what is now part of Baxter Close.

Wisbech Town F.C. of the United Counties League Premier Division North is based in Walsoken, formerly on the Fenland Park on Lerowe Road and more recently on Lynn Road.
