= 1871 Grand National =

English steeplechase horse race

- Grand National
- Location: Aintree
- Date: 21 March 1871
- Winning horse: The Lamb
- Starting price: 11/2
- Jockey: Mr Tommy Pickernell
- Trainer: Chris Green
- Owner: Lord Poulett
- Conditions: Good to firm

The 1871 Grand National was the 33rd renewal of the Grand National horse race that took place at Aintree near Liverpool, England, on 21 March 1871.

== The Course ==
The experienced jockeys reported after walking the course that they felt the fences appeared smaller this year, despite an increase in the amount of gorse laid on them as they started to resemble modern Grand National fences. Most of the course was now laid to turf with only one section of plough along the Canal side of the course.

First circuit: From the start, the runners had a long run away from the racecourse, across the lane towards Fence 1 {15} Ditch and Rails Fence 2 {16} Ditch and Bank, Fence 3 {17} Double Rails, Fence 4 {18} Rails and Ditch, Fence 5 {19} Becher's Brook Fence 6 {20} Post and Rails, Fence 7 {21} Post and Rails, Fence 8 {22} Post and Rails {Canal Turn}, Fence 9 {23} Valentine's Brook, Fence 10 {24} Drop, Fence 11 {25} Post and Rails, Fence 12 {26} Table.

The runners then crossed the lane at the canal bridge to re-enter the racecourse proper, turning at the first opportunity towards the fences in front of the stands. Fence 13 Made Thorn, Fence 14 Stand Water.

Second circuit: The runners then turned away from the Grandstands again and crossed the lane again, following the first circuit until reaching the racecourse again. This time the runners continued to the wider extreme of the course after crossing the lane at canal bridge before turning to run up the straight in front of the stands where two hurdles, Fence 27 and Fence 28 had to be jumped

The runners then bypassed the Made Thorn and Stand Water inside before reaching the winning post in front of the Main Stand.

Modern writing refers to the second fence as Fan, after the mare who refused at that obstacle in three recent races over the fence, twice in the Grand National. However, none of the major contemporary press reports of the time used the term to describe the fence this year.

== Leading Contenders ==
Pearl Diver was attempting the race for the fourth time and was made favourite despite the fact that since finishing second in 1868 he had fallen at the Table, when going well in 1869 and was never in contention when finishing thirteenth last year. Johnny Page, who had won the race previously in 1867, reunited with the horse, having partnered him last year. Despite his recent National record and questions over the soundness of his legs, the public installed him as 4/1 favourite on the day.

The Lamb had been the horse that defeated Pearl Diver three years earlier, but had been missing from the most recent two renewals through injury. However, the grey was considered to be looking better than on his previous appearance. His partner in victory, George Ede had been killed on the course at last year's meeting, the day after riding in the National, which left the horse's owner, Lord Poulett requiring a new rider. Unknown at the time to the public, he wrote to nine time National rider, Tommy Pickernell, who won the race in 1860. Poulett advised Pickernell he had experienced two dreams, the first of which saw The Lamb finish tailed off. In a second dream he saw the horse win with Pickernell in the saddle. With a welter of Irish support, bolstered by the Irish victory of Greyhound, Master McGrath in the Waterloo Cup earlier in the day, The Lamb was sent off at 5/1.

Double winner, The Colonel was a long time ante post favourite to become the first treble winner of the race, but concerns over gruelling contests on the continent saw him eased to 8/1 on the day of the race. Record five time winning rider, George Stevens, who had been on board for both The Colonel's victories, became the second most experienced rider in the history of the race, taking his fifteenth ride.

Despatch had been sixth behind The Colonel in his first victory and his Aintree experience saw him backed to 10/1 with George Waddington taking this as his ninth attempt to win the race, having twice finished third.

The Doctor was another 10/1 shot, having finished second to The Colonel last year and sixth in his first attempt in 1866. Peter Crawshaw, who won the Sefton Hurdle at this meeting, was having his fourth ride in the race and was yet to finish in the first dozen.

Cecil completed the trio of 10/1 shots and was the best backed of the horses making their Grand National debut. However, when he came onto the course wearing blinkers, many viewed that as a bad sign in a race that didn't favour temperamental or easily distracted horses. Waterford born rider, Robert I'Anson, who won the Liverpool Hurdle at the meeting on Stradbroke had finished fourth on his Grand National debut last year.

== The Race ==
Rank outsider, Rufus quickly went to the front on the way to the first fence where St Valentine was the first to exit the contest. The Doctor refused at the third but was put to the fence quickly enough to be back on the tail of the main body of runners by the time they reached Becher's Brook for the first time. However the roguish Scots Grey tried to refuse at the fence after the brook, continuing on but leaving Cecil out of the race while The Doctor almost joined him, giving Robert I'Anson a hefty kicking while being almost brought to a stop, which effectively ended his race.

Rufus had opened up a lead of eight to ten lengths crossing the plough of the Canal side towards the Table where tragedy struck when the handily placed Lord Raglan caught a foreleg in a gully and shattered it trying to jump. Daniels immediately pulled the horse up but the injury was too severe to avoid having to be put down.

Despite an enforced changed in calendar date, which saw the race clash with the Lincoln Handicap, a crowd estimated in excess of 45,000 were on the course, with some encroaching literally into the racing line by the made thorn fence in front of the stands, with spectators having to scatter out of the way as Rufus led the field towards them. For a moment a pile up was feared but, despite one or two human injuries, the runners cleared the fence without issue and continued over the Stand Water missing just three of the starters. Rufus had led throughout from Souvenence, Wild Fox, The Lamb and Tusculamnum in fifth. Next came Snowstorm, Dog Fox, Alcibiade, Inon, Pearl Diver, Despatch, Philosopher, Bougue Homa, Magnum Bonum and Casse Tete, while The Colonel led the stragglers, The Doctor, Scots Grey, Purlbrook, Scaltheen, Lady Geraldine, and Scarrington.

Purlbrook was so exhausted at the first fence of the second circuit that the horse barely took off when falling, while The Doctor, Magnum Bonum and Scots Grey all decided to walk home by the time Becher's was reached for the second time. Rufus was still showing no sign of weakening as he led over from The Lamb and Wild Fox while the veteran, Alcibiade departed the contest when going well. Dog Fox also rapidly dropped away, having broken down.

Rufus continued to show no signs of weakening when taking to the plough along the Canal side, which saw The Lamb come under heavy pressure that appeared to suggest his chance was fading with Despatch, Wild Fox and Scarrington all coming past. However, the former winner was merely struggling on the plough and once back on grass at the Table he was back in contention and upsides the long time leader with Despatch, Scarrington, Pearl Diver, Tusculanum now looking to be the only ones likely to win as The Colonel and Wild Fox headed the trailing remainder, with Philosopher falling.

Back on the racecourse Rufus, The Lamb and Despatch went three lengths clear, but just as Pearl Diver moved to close the gap, so to did Rufus finally run out of energy, dropping away rapidly at the penultimate hurdle while further behind.

The Lamb took the final hurdle half a length up as Despatch tried to wear him down. However, there was little doubt of his two length victory with a further four lengths back to Scarrington who got up to beat Pearl Diver by a neck. Tusculanum was a fair way back when finishing fifth while Bogue Homa and Rufus walked in to allow The Colonel to pass them on the run un. Scalthene, Souvenence, Inon, Lady Geraldine, Snowstorm and Casse Tete all completed the course with Wild Fox bypassing the hurdles.

== Finishing Order ==
Position	Name	Jockey	Handicap (st-lb)	SP	Distance	Colours
Winner	The Lamb	Tommy Pickernell	11-4	5-1	2 Lengths	Cerise, blue sleeves and cap
Second	Despatch	George Waddington	10-0	10-1	4 Lengths	Cerise, white sash and cap
Third	Scarrington	Cranshaw	11-4	60-1	A Neck	White, black sash and cap
Fourth	Pearl Diver	Johnny Page	11-5	4-1 Fav		Red, yellow cap
Fifth	Tusculanum	Captain Arthur 'Doggie' Smith	11-0	50-1		White, black cap
Sixth	The Colonel	George Stevens	12-8	8-1		Red, blue sleeves, black cap
Seventh	Bogue Homa	Kaye 'Jeff' Tomlinson	10-4	50-1		White, blue sleeves, red sash and cap
Eighth	Rufus	Tom Ryan	11-4	150/1		Blue, orange sleeves, black cap
Ninth	Scaltheen	Gray	10-10	150/1		Tartan, yellow sleeves and cap
Tenth	Souvenance	John Rickaby	11-2	25-1		French grey, cerise sleeves and cap
Eleventh	Inon	Captain Frederick 'Lummy' Harford	10-4	66-1		Yellow, black cap
Twelfth	Lady Geraldine	Charles Cunningham	10-6	66-1		Green. black cap
Thirteenth	Snowstorm	Robert Walker	11-7	40-1		Black, red sash and cap
Fourteenth	Casse Tete	Joseph Rudd	10-10	66-1	Red, red and yellow quartered cap	
Fence 28 {Distance Hurdle}	Wild Fox	Murphy	10-12	150/1	Pulled Up	Black, orange spots, black cap
Fence 26 {Table}	Philosopher	H Ellison	10-12	100-1	Fell	Yellow, red sash, yellow cap
Fence 19 {Bechers Brook}	Alcibiade	E. Walling	10-4	100-1	Fell	Cherry, yellow spots and cap
Fence 19 [Bechers Brook]	The Doctor	Peter Crawshaw	11-13	10-1	Pulled Up	Cerise, French grey sleeves and cap
Fence 19 {Bechers Brook}	Magnum Bonum	John Richardson	10-10	50-1	Pulled Up	White, blue cap
Fence 19 {Bechers Brook}	Scots Grey	Welsh	10-5	150/1	Pulled Up	Purple, white cap
Fence 15 {Ditch and Rails}	Purlbook	Dick Marsh	10-10	25-1	Fell	Blue and white diablo, blue cap white diamonds
Fence 12 {Table}	Lord Raglan	Bill Daniels	10-10	66-1	Pulled Up (broken fetlock)	Blue, white cap
Fence 6 {Post and Rails}	Cecil	Robert I'Anson	10-6	10-1	Hampered and fell	Purple, white pin stripe and cap
Fence 1 {Post and Rails}	St. Valentine	Jimmy Adams	10-4	40-1	Fell	White, blue sleeves, red cap
Fence 19 {Bechers Brook}	Dog Fox {Formerly Vadette}	James Potter	10-0	25-1	Pulled Up {Broke Down}	Navy, white sash, navy cap

== Aftermath ==
When combined with the victory of the greyhound, Master McGrath earlier in the day in the Waterloo Cup, the Irish in the crowd went into wild celebration, chanting the name of both their winners as The Lamb was led in.

Initially many of those celebrating mistook The Colonel for The Lamb despite the two horses being different colours, although the racing silks of the jockeys were similar. George Stevens, the rider of The Colonel announced his retirement shortly after the race, only to lose his life in a non racing fall seven months later. Robert Taylor, who rode Snowstorm in the race also died in a fall before the next National, making it the second consecutive year in which two of the competing riders did not live to see the next renewal.

Many years later a cartoon print was created showing The Lamb jumping two fallen horses during the 1871 race, which became woven into the legend of his victory. However, no single fence claimed more than one faller this year and all who fell were behind The Lamb when they departed the contest. The only potential obstacle, other than a fence The Lamb faced was the encroaching crowd in front of the Made fence, who were forced to scatter as the field came towards them at the end of the first circuit.
