= 1856 Grand National =

English steeplechase horse race

- Grand National
- Location: Aintree
- Date: 27 February 1856
- Winning horse: Freetrader
- Starting price: 25/1
- Jockey: (England) George Stevens
- Trainer: William Holman
- Owner: W. Barnett
- Conditions: Good to soft

The 1856 Grand National was the 18th renewal of the Grand National horse race that took place at Aintree near Liverpool, England, on 27 February 1856. The race was won by Freetrader. This was the first of five times that George Stevens rode the winner of the Grand National.

This was the last time that the race was held in February.

== The Course ==
No major changes from previous years were reported to the course except that the second fence, in previous years described as a low stump hedge and drain, was this year described as a bank. The extreme turn was this year described as the extreme turning flag. However, the term Canal Turn appeared in the press for the first time when used to describe that fence in the Drogheda Argus. Fence ten, previously described as a hedge was now a quickset hedge and ditch. The fourteenth fence, called the bush fence reverted to its former description of Hurdles at the Distance.

First circuit: Start At the field adjacent to the wheat field beyond the lane, Fence 1 {16} Ditch, Fence 2 {17} Bank, Fence 3 {18} Post and Rails, Fence 4 {19} Old dead hedge with partial ditch on approach, Fence 5 {20} Becher's Brook, Fence 6 {21} Bank, Fence 7 {22} Bank, post and ditch, Fence 8 {23} Extreme Turning flag, Fence 9 {24} Valentine's Brook, Fence 10 {25} Quickset hedge and ditch, Fence 11 {26} Post and rails, Fence 12 {27} Ditch, Fence 13 {28} Hedge at Canal Bridge.

The runners then turned at the first opportunity on re-entering the racecourse and made towards the fences in front of the stands. Fence 14 Hurdles at the distance post, Fence 15 Artificial water jump, 13' 6" wide with a 3' high rail and 4' brook.

Second circuit: The runners then turned away from the Grandstands again and crossed Proceed's lane, into the a field known as the wheat piece before following the same circuit until reaching the racecourse again. This time the runners continued to the wider extreme of the course before turning to run up the straight in front of the stands. Fence 29 Long length hurdles, Fence 30 Distance hurdle.

The runners then bypassed the Bush fence and artificial Water Jump on the inside before reaching the winning post in front of the Main Stand.

== Build up and leading contenders ==
The introduction of a second day to the meeting this year addressed the complaints of recent years regarding the Grand National being staged so late in the day that visitors from the south were having to leave to catch the last express back to London before the race had even taken place. It was also seen by the press as a much needed shot in the arm for a sport that was suffering as a result of the Crimean War. Another ongoing criticism of the sport in general remained in the extremely low weight of the handicap, with no competitor this year asked to carry 11 stone. The low weights meant that for the first time since the race was run officially, Tom Olliver would not have a mount in the race, having been unable to get down to the weight to partner Minerva. William Archer was also left without a mount when he was 'jocked off' Forest Queen by John Thrift, her regular rider, when his mount Escape was a late withdrawal. It was also considered a rather poor quality field with none of the competitors being regarded as of the highest calibre.

The attendance was in usual numbers but there was a sharp decline of notables and influential in the crowd on previous years. This was put down to a combination of factors that racing was at a low ebb publicly with poor quality fields and low weighted handicaps, the Crimean War having taken its toll on the social circuit and the death since the previous year of one of the Grand National's biggest supporters, Lord Sefton, bringing an end to the large party that used to attend from Croxteth Hall due to his son fighting in Crimea. Their reporter nostalgically recalled the 1839 race, run exactly seventeen years previously as having drawn "A better class of visitors, a better class of horses, a better class of..." deciding his point was made. One reporter went as far as to suggest he had "Often witnessed more at a race on Bettystown Strand."

For the first time ever, two horses were sent from France to try and win the race, with Jean Du Quesne installed as 9/2 favourite on the day of the race. The press noted that in hindsight there had been very little to recommend the horse as the one with the best chance of winning. Harry Lamplugh, the French-based Yorkshire jockey took it as his fourth ride in the race.

Harry Lorrequer received the popular local support at 5/1.

Seaman was the favourite the evening before the race after huge bets in his favour and bold backing from his owner. His appearance in the paddock as nervous and sweating heavily saw him drift to 7/1

The Potter received a lot of interest in the betting rooms in the days leading up to the race, the public on course following suit to back him to 10/1

The twice previously placed Sir Peter Laurie had been the long time anti post favourite until fears that the weak legs, which had kept him away from Aintree in the previous two years had returned. His price was allowed to drift to 12/1. Support continued to wane after a disappointing prep run alongside his stable companion Freetrader. The absence of Tom Olliver from the weighing room made Bob Sly Junior the most experienced rider in the race, this being his seventh.

The Forest Queen, Stamford and Emigrant carried the majority of the rest of the public support while last year's runner up Freetrader was allowed to go off at 25/1 despite his good performance last year and looking very impressive in his prep run and in the paddock.

== The Race ==
The French favourite immediately went to the front from the off, with British Yeoman, The Forest Queen, Emigrant, Victor Emmanuel and The Pasha taking the first fence abreast.

Victor Emmanuel was the first casualty, falling at the second fence and continuing riderless while Forest Queen took up the running with the grey Dan O'Connell already starting to find the pace too much.

Approaching Becher's Brook for the first time, Harry Lorrequer veered into the crowd, knocking several spectators over and being badly hampered. At the fence itself Emigrant mad a bad mistake, losing his place near the front as his rider recovered the reins.

At the Canal Turn Forest Queen had built up a commanding lead as Emigrant regained the earlier lost ground to move clear in second from Jean Du Quesne, The Pasha and Seaman leading the remainder towards Valentine's.

As was common at this time, the heavy plough on the canal side caused the field to be spread out over a wide area before closing up again upon entering the racecourse. Upon reaching The Chair Forest Queen's lead had been reduced to just two lengths from The Potter, Jean Du Quesne and Emigrant.

Only one of the twenty-one who set out was missing as the field took the water in front of the stand. Forest Queen continuing to lead Jean Du Quesne, The Potter, Freetrader, Minerva, Seaman, The Pasha, Emigrant, Franc Picard, British Yeoman, Banstead, Little Charley and Hopeless Star with a gap back to Liverpool Boy, Jumpaway, Minos and Stamford with the last three Harry Lorrequer, Sir Peter Laurie and Dan O'Connell toiling in the rear.

Sir Peter Laurie was clearly seen to be struggling and had possibly broken down by the time he was either steered or bolted down Proceed's Lane and returned to the stables without going out for the second circuit.

Banstead was seen to be jumping well and moving closer to the leader when he hit the seventeenth fence, the bank hard, dislocating a shoulder, which resulted in the horse having to be euthanised.

The Potter moved up to challenge Forest Queen at the eighteenth fence, while behind them Stamford refused when losing touch at the rear of the field.

Yet again the crowd interfered with the runners at Bechers Brook when Forest Queen was hampered by a spectator, effectively ending her chance of victory while Harry Lorrequer's jockey, Fowler, pulled his mount up here and engaged with the crowd whom his mount had knocked over on the first circuit, though it wasn't recorded if the exchange was out of concern or anger. Forest Queen's issue left The Potter many lengths in front of Jean Du Quesne, Freetrader, British Yeoman and Minerva with Seaman, Franc Picard, Emigrant, Hopeless Star and The Pasha all still well up while Minos was still well to the rear with Little Charley, the latter having been repeatedly hampered by the loose Victor Emmanuel. Jumpaway, Liverpool Boy and Dan O'Connell all continued tailed off.

At the Canal Turn, Alec Goodman gained many lengths on British Yeoman to join The Potter as they led over the plough on the canal side until reaching the quickset hedge and ditch five fence from home where The Potter made a bad mistake, effectively ending his bid and leaving British Yeoman in front going to the fourth last.

Crossing the lane British Yeoman was still in front when he broke down on the off fore leg, being quickly passed by Minerva, Freetrader and Hopeless Star while Minos had finally come from well to the rear to join the leaders as the remainder all began to weaken heading for the home turn.

The race lay between these four at the hurdles with Minerva leading marginally going into the final flight, jumping is slightly ahead of Freetrader and Hopeless Star with Minos a length down and trying to find better ground.

Minerva hit the final hurdle hard and did well to stay on her feet but vital momentum was lost and, having been given the advantage Freetrader maintained it to the finish with rider George Stevens receiving great praise for his partnership of the horse. Minerva was a length down in third place, just holding off Minos by half a length with Hopeless Star beaten the same. Little Charley was fifth, Emmigrant a bad sixth, Forest Queen tailed off in seventh, ahead of The Potter, the favourite walked in with Seaman and British Yeoman.

== Finishing Order ==
Position	Name	Jockey	Handicap (st-lb)	SP	Distance	Colours
Winner	Freetrader	George Stevens	9-6	25-1	10 mins 9.5 secs	Black, white sleeves and cap
Second	Minerva	Robert Sly Jr	9-10	25-1	1 length	Burgundy, black cap
Third	Minos	Robert James	9-4	66-1	1/2 length	Red, white sash, black cap
Fourth	Hopeless Star {formerly Star of England}	Walter White	10-8 {incl 6lbs extra}	25-1	1/2 length	
Fifth	Little Charley	T.J. Burrows	9-4	40-1		Purple, orange sleeves, black cap
Sixth	Emigrant	Charles Boyce	10-2	100-6	A bad sixth	Purple, orange sash and cap
Seventh	The Forest Queen	John Thrift	10-2	15-1		Tartan, yellow sleeves, black cap
Eighth	Potter	Joe Kendall	9-8	10-1	Tailed off	Black, red cap
Ninth	Jean Du Quesne	Harry Lamplugh	10-06	9/2 Fav	Pulled up and Walked in	Burgundy, white piping, black cap
Tenth	Seaman	F. Martin	10-4 {2lbs extra}	7-1	Pulled up and Walked in	Red, black cap
Eleventh and last	British Yeoman	Alec Goodman	9-07	40/1	Broke Down, Walked in	Light blue, white cap
Non Finishers
Fence 29 {Hurdles}	Franc Picard	F Wakefield	10-12	66/1	Pulled Up	Burgundy, white piping, black cap
Fence 25 {Quickset hedge and ditch}	The Pasha	Dan Meaney	10-04	40/1	Fell	Red and white hoops, black cap
Fence 20 Bechers Brook	Harry Lorrequer	W Fowler	8-10	5/1	Pulled Up	Green, yellow sleeves, black cap
Fence 20 Bechers Brook	Stamford	Chris Green	9-02 {inc 2lbs extra}	15/1	Refused or Pulled up	Purple, orange sash and cap
Fence 17 {Bank}	Banstead	Willy Bevill	9-04	50/1	Fell {Dislocated shoulder, destroyed}	Chartreuse
Fence 18	Sir Peter Laurie	Sam Darling Jnr	10-12	12/1	Ran out, Broke down and/or Pulled up at Proceeds Lane	Black, white sleeves and cap
Fence 15 {Water}	Dan O'Connell	R Archer	9-04	66/1	Tailed off, Fell Canal side 2nd circuit	
Fence 15 {Water}	Jumpaway	John Hanlon	9-10	25/1	Tailed off, Pulled up 2nd circuit	Green, Black cap*
Fence 15 {Water}	Liverpool Boy	Mclean	9-00	66/1	Tailed off, Pulled up 2nd circuit	
Fence 2 {Bank}	Victor Emmanuel	Seffert	9-04	66/1	Fell	Pink and buff stripes, black cap

- Jumpaway's owner fined for not declaring his colours

== Aftermath ==
Banstead was found to have dislocated a shoulder when falling at the bank on the second circuit and after assessment from a vet, was euthanised. Minerva suffered a minor foot injury when hitting the final hurdle. Despite having run a circuit and a half of the National, Stamford was sufficiently rested to go out and win the next race, a hurdle in a canter. All of the jockeys returned to weigh in. There was some annoyance among backers of Sir Peter Laurie when it was discovered his owner, William Barnett had won a sizable some on stable companion Freetrader with on punter confronting the owner on the subject publicly.
