= 1864 Grand National =

English steeplechase horse race

- Grand National
- Location: Aintree
- Date: 9 March 1864
- Winning horse: Emblematic
- Starting price: 10/1
- Jockey: (England) George Stevens
- Trainer: Edwin Weever
- Owner: Lord Coventry
- Conditions: Soft (good to soft in places)

The 1864 Grand National was the 26th renewal of the Grand National horse race that took place at Aintree near Liverpool, England, on 9 March 1864. The winning mare was a full sister to the 1863 winner Emblem.

== The Course ==
Some small changes were made to the first fence, Becher's Brook and Valentines Brook this year.

First circuit: Fence 1 {15} Thorn fence bank, replaced with a double post and rails Fence 2 {16} Ditch and Bank, Fence 3 {17} Double Rails, Fence 4 {18} Rails and Ditch, Fence 5 {19} Becher's Brook, widened by 2 feet this year Fence 6 {20} Post and Rails, Fence 7 {21} Post and Rails Fence 8 {22} Extreme Turn, often referred to as the Canal Turn in previous years, Fence 9 {23} Valentine's Brook, Fence 10 {24} Ditch and Quickset, Fence 11 {25} Post and Rails, Fence 12 {26} Stump Hedge and Ditch.

The runners then crossed the lane at the canal bridge to re-enter the racecourse proper, turning at the first opportunity towards the fences in front of the stands. Fence 13 Gorse Hurdle, Fence 14 Artificial Brook.

Second circuit: The runners then turned away from the Grandstands again and crossed what had been known in the 1850s as Proceed's Lane, following the same circuit until reaching the racecourse again. This time the runners continued to the wider extreme of the course before turning to run up the straight in front of the stands where Fence 27 Hurdle had to be jumped.

The runners then bypassed the Gorsed Hurdle and Artificial brook inside before reaching the winning post in front of the Main Stand.

== Build up and leading contenders ==
Jerusalem was installed as a short priced 9/2 favourite after much speculation in the weeks leading up to the race as to whether he would run at all. Now certain that he would take part and that George Ede would have him as his fourth ride in the race, having been second on Weathercock in 1858, the racegoers on course were content he couldn't be beaten if he avoided accident.

Bantam at 5/1 had shared favouritism in the days leading up to the race and was another the press felt sure must win if accident were avoided. This would be a second ride in the race for George Holman.

Embelmatic was a full sister to last year's winner Emblem and the confidence that was held by her team, the same that delivered victory last year, was hard to ignore, though the public didn't quite support her with the same confidence as her sister at 10/1. George Stevens was bidding to equal Tom Olliver's record three victories in the race.

Real Jam was the most popular horse in the race with previous experience, though his performance twelve months earlier where he never figured at the business end of the race, was hardly the inspiration for his support at 11/1. David Hughes retained the ride from last year.

Serious Case was also sent off at 11/1 and the third ride in the race for George Waddington, having previously steered Old Ben Roe to be third in 1861.

== The Race ==
Most of the twenty-five competitors got off to a good start with Emblematic and Silk And Satin a little slow away while Sir William showed less than enthusiastic by bucking and kicking before being convinced to join the pursuit.

Ireley quickly opened of a lead over the second fence where the hopes of favourite backers were dashed as Jerusalem fell, along with Santanella and although Ede remounted, all chance was gone and he would eventually pull up at the completion of the first circuit.

By Becher's Brook Irely was bowling along with an eight length lead over Bell's Life, Thomastown, Wee Nell, Serious Case, National Petition, Arbury, Chester, Portland, Real Jam, Ocean Witch, Leonidas, Brian Borhoime, Bantam and Emblematic well to the rear of the main body of twenty-three still continuing.

Along the Canal side, the eleventh fence claimed Portland and left a main field of twenty-two starters to bunch up at the Gorsed Hurdle. Ireley was swallowed up by the ruck here and it was Real Jam who led over the water jump from Ireley, Thomastown, National Petition, Wee Nell, Arbury, Emblematic, Chester, Reporter, Serious Case, Leonidas, Ocean Witch, Bantam, Miss Maria, Sir William and Little Bob. However the last three of the main body, Martha, Harry and Romeo all found the water too much for them and all fell, with only Silk And Satin and the hugely tailed off favourite behind them.

Going out for the second circuit Arbury now moved to the front and at fence sixteen Reporter had his hoofs clipped, causing him to fall.

The next fence, the double rails caused carnage that accounted for half the remaining runners as National Petition, Ocean Witch, Sir William, Little Bob, Miss Maria, Real Jam were all brought to a stop while Ireley and Bells Life fell.

That left only ten effectively still in the race going to Bechers for the second time with Arbury leading Thomastown, Emblematic, Chester, Brian Borhoime, Bantam, Leonidas, Wee Nell and Serious Case with Silk And Satin well to the rear.

The extreme turn ended Wee Nells chance when refusing while Silk And Satin who had effectively been out of contention form a very early stage, finally pulled up. Brian Borhoime briefly mounted a challenge to Arbury but was quickly found to be lacking the stamina and it was Embelmatic instead who moved up to challenge the leader at Valentines Brook.

Along the Canal side these two began to draw clear of Bantam, Leonidas, Thomastown and Chester while the tiring Brian Borhoime fell at the third last.

The race was briefly a duel at the final hurdle before it was clear that Embelmatic had the measure of Arbury and came home three lengths clear. Chester was a distance behind in third, holding off Thomastown by two lengths while only Ocean Witch caught in the melee earlier in the race, persisted to finish fifth.

Among those who walked in were Bantam and Leonidas having given up the chase before the final hurdle.

== Finishing Order ==
Position	Name	Jockey	Handicap (st-lb)	SP	Distance	Colours
Winner	Emblematic	George Stevens	10-6	10-1	11 minutes, 50 seconds	Brown, light blue cap
Second	Arbury	Ben Land	11-12	40-1	3 lengths	Buff, blue cap
Third	Chester	Walter White	10-0	40-1	A distance	
Fourth	Thomastown	James Murphy	12-0	33-1	2 Lengths	Burgundy, blue sleeves, white cap
Fifth	Ocean Witch	William Reeves	10-2	20-1	Stopped {17} went on, Last to Complete	Green and black stripes, black cap
Fence 27 {Final Hurdle}	Bantam	George Holman	11-8	5-1	Pulled Up	Black, white sleeves, black cap
Fence 27 {Final Hurdle}	Leonidas	Charles Boyce	11-4	100-1	Pulled Up	White, blue cap
Fence 27 {Final Hurdle}	Serious Case	George Waddington	11-3	11-1	Pulled Up	Blue, black cap
Fence 25 {Post and Rails}	Brian Borhoime	J. Poinons	10-4	100-1	Fell	
Fence 22 {Extreme Turn}	Wee Nell	James Knott	11-6	12-1	Refused	Purple, orange cap
Fence 17 {Double Post and Rails}	Bell's Life	Griffiths	10-12	30-1	Fell	
Fence 17 {Double Post and Rails}	Ireley	M. Blake	10-10	40-1	Fell	Brown, yellow spots and cap
Fence 17 {Double Post & Rails}	Little Bob	Pat Igoe	11-0	100-1	Hampered and refused	Blue, tartan sash, red cap
Fence 17 {Double Post and Rails}	Miss Maria	J. Holman	10-0	100-1	Hampered and refused	Buff, blue sleeves and cap
Fence 17 {Double Post and Rail}	National Petition	J. Monaghan	10-8	100-1	Hampered and Refused	Light blue, black cap
Fence 17 {Double Post and Rails}	Real Jam	David Hughes	10-8	11-1	Hampered and refused	Purple, Green sleeves, white cap
Fence 17 {Double Post and Rails}	Sir William	C. Davison	11-10	100-1	Refused	Blue, white cap
Fence 16 {Ditch and Bank}	Reporter	Dixon	12-2	40-1	Hampered & Fell	
Fence 14 {Artificial Brook}	Harry	J. Cassidy	11-10	50-1	Fell	Yellow, blue sleeves and cap
Fence 14 {Artificial Water Jump}	Martha	John Land	10-0	33-1	Fell	Black, red sleeves and cap
Fence 14 {Artificial Brook}	Romeo	F. Martin	11-0	33-1	Fell	Black, light blue cap
Fence 11 {Post and Rails}	Portland	Alec Goodman	10-12	12-1	Fell	
Fence 3 {Double Rails}	Silk And Satin	Bill Jarvis	10-0	100-1	Tailed off, Pulled up 2nd circuit	Buff and purple stripes, black cap
Fence 2 {Ditch and Bank}	Jerusalem	George Ede	11-10	9-2	Fell, remounted tailed off	Blue, tartan sash, red cap
Fence 2 {Ditch and Bank}	Santanella	Dan Meaney	10-12	100-1	Fell	Black, yellow and red stripes, hooped cap

== Aftermath ==
George Stevens equalled Tom Olliver's record of three victories in the race.
