= 1869 Grand National =

English steeplechase horse race

- Grand National
- Location: Aintree
- Date: 3 March 1869
- Winning horse: The Colonel
- Starting price: 100/7
- Jockey: George Stevens
- Trainer: R. Roberts
- Owner: John Weyman
- Conditions: Soft

The 1869 Grand National was the 31st renewal of the Grand National horse race that took place at Aintree near Liverpool, England, on 3 March 1869.

== The Course ==
This year, the fence after Valentine's Brook, previously referred to as the Ditch & Quickset Hedge was now called the Drop Fence.

First circuit: From the start, the runners had a long run away from the racecourse, across the lane towards Fence 1 {15} Ditch and Rails Fence 2 {16} Ditch and Bank, Fence 3 {17} Double Rails, Fence 4 {18} Rails and Ditch, Fence 5 {19} Becher's Brook Fence 6 {20} Post and Rails, Fence 7 {21} Post and Rails, Fence 8 {22} Canal Turn, Fence 9 {23} Valentine's Brook, Fence 10 {24} Drop, Fence 11 {25} Post and Rails, Fence 12 {26} Table Top.

The runners then crossed the lane at the canal bridge to re-enter the racecourse proper, turning at the first opportunity towards the fences in front of the stands. Fence 13 Gorse Hurdle, Fence 14 Stand Water.

Second circuit: The runners then turned away from the Grandstands again and crossed the lane again, following the first circuit until reaching the racecourse again. This time the runners continued to the wider extreme of the course after crossing the lane at canal bridge before turning to run up the straight in front of the stands where Fence 27 Hurdle had to be jumped. This year a second hurdle Fence 28 was reinstated for the first time since 1857.

The runners then bypassed the Gorsed Hurdle and Stand Water inside before reaching the winning post in front of the Main Stand.

== Leading Contenders ==
Firtunatus was sent off at 7/2 favourite after owner, Mr Brayley declared him to win over his other entrant, last year's runner up, Pearl Diver. Johnny Page took the mount as his fifth ride, having won the race two years earlier.

Fan was sent off as 4/1 second favourite, her backers regarding the mare's performance as runner up two years ago over her second fence refusal last year. Arthur Thorpe had ridden the mare on both of those previous occasions and took the ride again.

Despatch was 5/1 third in the market after last year's winning rider, George Ede took the mount when his partner in victory, The Lamb was withdrawn.

The Colonel was one of the hottest favourites to win the race for many years when the weights were announced, despite having only raced once over fences. Despite winning his prep hurdle at Nottingham, the public cooled to the horse, despite being the chosen mount of triple winner George Stevens. However, he too was a rider under public scrutiny after his previous patron, Lord Coventry had claimed he had lost his edge. The pair were sent off at 100/7

Guy Of Warwick was another strong favourite who drifted in the market after a poor performance over hurdles the day before the National. H Crawshaw took the ride on the 100/7 shot as his second in the race.

Pearl Diver was 100/7 to go one better than his second place the previous year, especially with a more experienced rider in William Reeves. His price was made longer by owner, Mr Brayley's announcement in favour of his other runner, Fortunatus.

== The Race ==
The Twenty-two runners were sent off at the third time of asking with Globule heading the charge to the first fence, except that for once the runners set off more as if taking part in a Sunday canter than a horse race. Despite the unusually sedate pace the runners crossed the lane towards the first fence to find that the crowd was swollen to the point they had heavily encroached onto the course, narrowing the first fence to half it's normal width. In such limited space, any error by any runner was likely to cause problems and sure enough when the mare Fan made to refuse, a melee occurred, which saw her fall and bring down Bishopton. Orne and Havelock with several others hampered.

Guy Of Warwick, Knave Of Trumps and Plumcake were all so disrupted that they all dug their heels in at the second fence while the tailed off Fan followed suit for the second year in a row, lending her name to the fence for the next decade until it was resited.

The pace was so slow that Plumcake had caught the tail of the field by the time they reached Becher's Brook for the first time where they landed in the brook and almost came to grief again. The reprieve was short lived when they refused the next fence, stopping tail ender, Dick Turpin in the process.

With the field severely reduced and much more space to operate in, the survivors were able to gather themselves along the Canal side with Globule and Gardener setting the incredibly slow pace. Pearl Diver was moving up to take up the running when he mistimed the jump at the table, somersaulting over the bank and presenting the unusual site of William Reeves chasing after the horses as they re-entered the course, trying to catch his mount. Any chance of continuing the race was over when Pearl Diver almost injured himself jumping the rails beside the water jump.

The field took fences in front of the stands almost as one with The Nun rushing to the front of Globule, Q.C., Hall Court, Despatch, Huntsman's Daughter, and Fortunatus with a brief gap to Alcibiade, Gardener, Harcourt, Barbarian who jumped together ahead of The Colonel and The Robber staying well to the rear.

Globule went back to the front turning out for the second circuit where the reduced field made the lack of space down to Bechers less of an issue. However, an increase in pace quickly saw the first circuit leader become outpaced and Despatch, Q.C., Gardener, The Nun and Hall Court took it in line with Huntsmans Daughter, Fortunatus and Alcibiade close up behind with The Colonel ahead of the rapidly tiring Globule and tailed off The Robber while Barbarian was pulled up.

At the Canal side Gardener and Alcibiade set out to break their opponents, which put paid to The Nun, Harcourt and the favourite, Fortunatus who were all tailed off by the time the table jump was reached. The two leaders still had Q.C., Hall Court, Huntsman's Daughter, The Colonel and Despatch all still in contention.

Despatch briefly move up to challenge but was quickly tiring, along with Q.C. as the remaining five turned for the straight almost together. Gardener and Alcibiade took the penultimate hurdle together, crashing through the timber as The Colonel cruised up between them. Huntsman's Daughter was immediately behind when she stood on the broken hurdle, shattering a fetlock and having to immediately pull up as Hall Court swept past.

The Colonel appeared to be cantering into the final hurdle, but smashed into it, requiring George Stevens to gather his mount back up and briefly suggesting the three chasing horses might have hope. Gardener made a tired jump in second while third placed Hall Court also broke down the fence just ahead of Alcibiade and it was quickly clear that The Colonel was going to win as he liked, giving George Stevens a record fourth victory ride by three lengths. Gardener was exhausted and almost staggering as Hall Court snatched second by one length with Alcibiade a further length down in fourth. Q.C. was six lengths behind in fifth with a gap of a further twenty lengths to Despatch. Globule had slowed to a walk by the time he reached the chair but still passed the post long before the last official finisher, The Robber.

== Finishing Order ==
Position	Name	Jockey	Handicap (st-lb)	SP	Distance	Colours
Winner	The Colonel	George Stevens	10-7	100/7	3 Lengths	Steel blue, white sleeves, black cap
Second	Hall Court	Arthur Tempest	10-12	100/1	1 Length	Scarlet, white sash and cap
Third	Gardener	Tom Ryan	10-7	66-1	1 Length	White, blue cap
Fourth	Alcibiade	Col George 'Curly' Knox	11-2	20-1	6 Lengths	Cherry, yellow spots and cap
Fifth	Q.C.	Griffiths	10-9	20-1	20 lengths	Blue, black cap
Sixth	Despatch	George Ede	10-8	5-1	A distance	Magenta, white sash and cap
Seventh	Globule	George Holman	10-12	25-1	A distance	Magenta, black cap
Eighth	The Robber	William Jenkins (aka Peter Merton)	11-2	100-1	Last to finish	Red, black sleeves and cap
Fence 27 {Final Hurdle}	Huntsman's Daughter	Johnny Holman	10-8	40-1	Pulled Up	Magenta
Fence 26 {Penultimate Hurdle}	Fortunatus	Johnny Page	11-4	7/2 Fav	Pulled Up	Red, yellow cap
Fence 26 {Penultimate Hurdle}	Harcourt	Capt Frederick 'Lummy' Harford	10-10	40-1	Pulled Up	Cherry, yellow spots, red cap
Fence 26 {Penultimate Hurdle}	The Nun	Tommy Pickernell	11-9	25-1	Pulled up	Red and Purple jagged horizontal halves, red cap
Fence 19 {Bechers Brook}	Barbarian	George Waddington	10-10	40/1	Pulled Up	Buff, red sleeves, black cap
Fence 12 {Table}	Pearl Driver	William Reeves	12-7	100/7	Fell	Red, black cap
Fence 6 {Post & Rails}	Dick Turpin	James Knott	10-0	40-1	Hampered & refused	Navy Blue, red cap
Fence 2 {Ditch & Bank}	Guy of Warwick	Hiram 'Peter' Crawshaw	10-0	100/7	Refused	Black, red cap
Fence 2 {Ditch & Bank}	Knave of Trumps	F. Martin	10-6	20-1	Refused, Went on and refused at fence 5	Blue, red cap
Fence 2 {Ditch & Bank}	Plum Cake	George Spafford	10-0	66-1	Refused, went on, refused again Fence 6	Indigo
Fence 1 {Ditch & Rails}	Bishopston	James Potter	10-4	150/1	Brought Down	Red, white sash, black cap
Fence 1 {Ditch & Rails}	Havelock	John Wheeler	11-0	33-1	Brought Down	Black, yellow sash, black cap
Fence 1 {Ditch & Rails}	Orne	Walter White	11-2	50-1	Brought Down	White
Fence 1 {Ditch & Rails}	Fan	Arthur Thorpe	10-6	4/1	Fell, remounted and refused Fence 2	Brown, white cap

== Aftermath ==
There was initial concern as jockeys White, Wheeler and Potter and the horse Bishopton all remained motionless after the first fence melee. However, the horse and jockeys White and Potter were back on their feet before the horses came round for the second circuit while Wheeler regained consciousness after being taken back to the weighing room.

Although jockey Johnny Holman immediately pulled Huntsman's Daughter up after she broke down at the penultimate hurdle, the seriousness of her injury wasn't immediately apparent until he brought the horse back to the stables. Holman felt she would have placed second or third but for the accident.

Fans refusal at the second fence for the second consecutive year resulted in the fence informally being named after her. The name fell out of fashion a decade later when the fences were resited.
