= 1861 Grand National =

English steeplechase horse race

- Grand National
- Location: Aintree
- Date: 13 March 1861
- Winning horse: Jealousy
- Starting price: 5/1
- Jockey: Joseph Kendall
- Trainer: Charles Balchin
- Owner: J. Bennett
- Conditions: Good to soft (soft in places)

The 1861 Grand National was the 23rd renewal of the Grand National horse race that took place at Aintree near Liverpool, England, on 13 March 1861.

== The Course ==
The course remained as normal with only a slight stiffening of many of the posts and rails at various fences. The Artificial Brook was overflowing after heavy rain in the days leading up to the race. First circuit: Starting from the field used every year since 1851, Fence 1 {15} Bank, Fence 2 {16} Hedge and ditch, Fence 3 {17} Post and Rails, Fence 4 {18} Rails and ditch, Fence 5 {19} Becher's Brook, Fence 6 {20} Post and Rails, had included a ditch last year not mentioned by the press this year, Fence 7 {21} Post and rails Fence 8 {22} Hedge and Ditch, often referred to as the Canal Turn in previous recent years, Fence 9 {23} Valentine's Brook, Fence 10 {24} Ditch and quickset, Fence 11 {25} Post and rails, Fence 12 {26} Stump hedge and ditch.

The runners then crossed the lane at the canal bridge to re-enter the racecourse proper, turning at the first opportunity towards the fences in front of the stands. Fence 13 Gorse Hurdle, Fence 14 Artificial Brook.

Second circuit: The runners then turned away from the Grandstands again and crossed the lane known until recent years as Proceed's lane, following the same circuit until reaching the racecourse again. This time the runners continued to the wider extreme of the course before turning to run up the straight in front of the stands where Fence 27 Hurdle had to be jumped.

The runners then bypassed the Gorsed Hurdle and Artificial brook inside before reaching the winning post in front of the Main Stand.

== Build up and Leading Contenders ==
Anatis at 4/1 was installed as an early ante post favourite on the back of winning the previous year, although support for the mare wavered in the days leading up to the race, she was quickly reinstalled as favourite on being presented in the paddock and talked up as by far the best horse in the race. Both of Tommy Pickernell's previous rides had been on the mare. He rode under the name Mr Thomas.

Jealousy at 5/1 was another mare who had been highly thought of the previous year before being withdrawn and had a proven record across country as well as on the flat. George Stevens had turned down multiple rides to partner the mare only to be retained by the owners of the outsider, Comet, which was then withdrawn shortly before the race. Joe Kendall, who had previously partnered the mare to eleventh place in 1859, retained the mount as his fifth National ride. However, that performance led some to question her ability to stay.

Cockatoo at 7/1 had the guidance of the only fuel winning rider in the race, Chris Green, on his ninth ride, as well as being the bottom weight at just 8 stone 8lbs to carry.

Master Bagot at 8/1 was, along with The Rover, one of the two greys in the race. With a good reputation from running on the flat, as well as finishing third in the recent Queen's plate. He provided a second ride in the race for George Ede, riding under the name Mr Edwards. Ede had steered Weathercock into second place on his debut in 1858.

Old Ben Roe at 10/1 was better known to the racing public under the previous name, Joe Maley, having beaten many of his Aintree opponents the previous spring at both Birmingham and Warwick. He was regarded by some in the press as among the finest fencers in the country. Waddington had easily the best chance of the eight riders making their National debut.

== The Race ==
Twenty-four lined up beneath bright skies but on holding, rain-softened ground. Xanthus showed first, but was soon passed by Redwing, who cut out a searching pace, with The Freshman and The Rover in close pursuit.

The second fence brought the first drama: a scrimmage at the hedge-and-ditch, caused by a hole in the fence saw Irish Emigrant knocked over, his rider Robert Sly trampled and badly injured. Several others – Diamant, Kibworth Lass, Brother to Lady’s Maid, Dr Leete, and Kilcock – were badly hampered. Longrange then ran out at the third, reducing the field further.

By Becher’s (5th), Redwing was a dozen lengths clear of Xanthus and The Freshman, with Cockatoo and Anatis close behind. Diamant and Kibworth Lass refused and took no further part. Master Bagot fell heavily at the seventh and both horse and rider were badly shaken, while The Conductor crashed at the Canal Turn (8th) in a fall that would later result in the horse having to be destroyed. At Valentine’s (9th) The Freshman came down and although Blake made a quick attempt to remount, broken reins ended their day.

Heading down the Canal Side, Redwing still dictated but was gradually reeled in by Xanthus. Behind, Cockatoo, Old Ben Roe, Bridegroom and Jealousy moved into striking range. At the 16th, Cockatoo fell when lying second, his rider, Chris Green fortunate to escape serious harm, though the mare ran loose thereafter, while the chances of the favourite were all but ended when Pickernell was almost unseated from Anatis when stumbling over the fallen horse, clinging round the mare's neck for many lengths before managing to get back in the saddle. Dr Leete also fell here, leaving Marson injured.

Crossing Becher’s for the second time, Redwing still led narrowly, but his earlier exertions soon told. He was almost undone by the prostrate Conductor at the Canal Turn, and the relentless gallop began to catch up with him.

At the 25th, Old Ben Roe and Xanthus pressed on, with Bridegroom and the steadily advancing Jealousy stalking just behind. Turning for home, Jealousy swept to the front, travelling easily, and quickly asserted. The Dane, who had been nowhere for most of the journey, suddenly arrived with a storming late run, but though he cut down the margin after the last, Jealousy was always holding him to score cosily by two lengths. Old Ben Roe kept on for third, just ahead of Bridegroom and Xanthus, with the gallant Redwing plugging on in sixth. Wee Nell, The Unknown and Emperor completed the finishers, with several others trailing in riderless or walking in, having given up the chase at the turn for home.

== Finishing Order ==
Position	Name	Jockey	Handicap (st-lb)	SP	Distance	Colours
Winner	Jealousy	Joe Kendall	9–12	5-1	10 mins 14 secs	White, red garters, black cap
Second	The Dane	Walter White	10–0	33-1	2 lengths	White
Third	Old Ben Roe	George Waddington	10–7	10-1	2 Lengths	Cerise, green sleeves, black cap
Fourth	Bridegroom	Fitzadam	10–7	25-1	1 Length	Cherry, yellow spots and cap
Fifth	Xanthus	Charles Boyce	9–8	50-1	A neck	White, blue garters, red cap
Sixth	Redwing	James Murphy	9–7	25-1	5 Lengths	White, one red sleeve, black cap
Seventh	Wee Nell	James Knott	9–11	100-1		Tartan, yellow sleeves, black cap
Eighth	The Unknown	George Eatwell	8–12	100-1		Cerise and silver hoops, white cap
Ninth and last	The Emperor	Alec Goodman	10–2	100-8		Buff, red sleeves, black cap
Fence 27 {Final Hurdle}	Anatis	Tommy Pickernell	10–4	4-1	Pulled up	Purple, orange sleeves, black cap
Fence 27 {Final Hurdle}	Franc Picard	Harry Lamplugh	10–0	14-1	Pulled up	Maroon, white piping, black cap
Fence 27 {Final Hurdle}	The Rover	F. Page	8–8	100-1	Pulled up	Orange, black sleeves, orange cap
Fence 20 {Post & Rails}	Brunette	Fogo Rowlands	11–0	33-1	Tailed off, Pulled up and walked in	Buff, silver sleeves and cap
Fence 16 {Hedge & Ditch}	Cockatoo	Chris Green	8–8	7-1	Fell	Maroon, gold braid
Fence 16	Dr. Leete	Job Marson Jnr	8–8	100-1	Fell	Buff, white sleeves, black cap
Fence 9 {Valentine's Brook}	The Freshman	Blake	9–7	100-7	Fell	Blue, white sleeves, black cap
Fence 8 {Canal Turn}	The Conductor	John Nightingall	8–12	40-1	Fell {Euthanised}	Purple, orange sash and cap
Fence 7 {Post & Rails}	Master Bagot	George Ede	10–0	8-1	Fell	White, black sleeves and cap
Fence 5 Becher's Brook	Kibworth Lass	Tom Olliver Jr.	11–3	100-1	Refused, Tailed off and Pulled up 12, walked in	Blue, cerise cap
Fence 5 {Becher's Brook}	Diament	E. Enoch	10–4	100-1	Refused, Tailed off, pulled up 12 and walked in	Indigo
Fence 3 {Post & Rails}	Longrange	R. Sherrard	9–10	100-1	Bolted	Black, red cap
Fence 2	Brother To Lady's Maid	Harris	10–3	100-1	Hampered and Tailed off, Pulled up 27, walked in	Green, pink sleeves, black cap
Fence 2	The Irish Emigrant	Robert Sly Jr.	9–0	100-1	Fell	Indigo, Gold braid
Fence 2	Kilcock	Dan Meaney	9–10	40-1	Hampered and Tailed off, Pulled up 19	Violet and black hoops, black cap

== Aftermath ==
The Conductor had been left on the course after suffering a shoulder injury on the first circuit, being further kicked by Redwing when jumping the Canal Turn second time. It wasn't until later in the evening that the horse euthanised, the reason for the delay was never stated.

Several jockeys were also injured. Robert Sly Junior was carried unconscious from the course, after his fall from The Irish Emigrant in the melee at the second fence. He regained consciousness later that evening. Sixteen year old Job Marson Junior was also hit in the face after his fall from Dr Leete at the same fence on the second circuit. George Ede was also much shaken after his fall from Master Bagot, the horse also badly shaken.
