= 1863 Grand National =

English steeplechase horse race

- Grand National
- Location: Aintree
- Date: 11 March 1863
- Winning horse: Emblem
- Starting price: 4/1
- Jockey: (England) George Stevens
- Trainer: Edwin Weever
- Owner: Lord Coventry
- Conditions: Good to firm (good in places)

The 1863 Grand National was the 25th renewal of the Grand National horse race that took place at Aintree near Liverpool, England, on 11 March 1863.

The winning mare's full sister Emblematic won the race the following year.

== The Course ==
In order to give the runners a better chance to find a position before reaching the first fence, the start was moved to a position in front of the stables, where it would remain for the next 150 years First circuit: Fence 1 {15} Bank, Fence 2 {16} Hedge, Ditch and Cop, Fence 3 {17} Post and Rails, Fence 4 {18} Rails and Ditch, Fence 5 {19} Becher's Brook, Fence 6 {20} Post and Rails, Fence 7 {21} Post and Rails Fence 8 {22} Extreme Turn, often referred to as the Canal Turn in previous years, Fence 9 {23} Valentine's Brook, Fence 10 {24} Ditch and Quickset, Fence 11 {25} Post and Rails, Fence 12 {26} Stump Hedge and Ditch.

The runners then crossed the lane at the canal bridge to re-enter the racecourse proper, turning at the first opportunity towards the fences in front of the stands. Fence 13 Gorse Hurdle, Fence 14 Artificial Brook.

Second circuit: The runners then turned away from the Grandstands again and crossed what had been known in the 1850s as Proceed's Lane, following the same circuit until reaching the racecourse again. This time the runners continued to the wider extreme of the course before turning to run up the straight in front of the stands where Fence 27 Hurdle had to be jumped.

The runners then bypassed the Gorsed Hurdle and Artificial brook inside before reaching the winning post in front of the Main Stand.

== Build up and leading contenders ==
The race was staged the day after the wedding of Prince Albert, the Prince of Wales to Alexandra of Denmark and so saw Liverpool and Aintree at a higher state of festival than usual. The press noted that it was said this coincided with the Grand National's prestige as the Derby of Steeplechasing having largely been lost due to poor handicapping and betting irregularities. This also led to handicapper, Topham having to present his handicap before the stewards for approval for the first time, a decision which saw a marked improvement in the handicap this year.

Jealousy was sent off at 3/1 favourite, having won the race two years earlier and despite not having seen a racecourse since her late withdrawal from the 1862 race. Her partner in victory, Joe Kendall took it as his sixth and final ride in the race as he would have his licence taken away before the end of the year.

Emblem was another mare and flat race reject who had at one time been thought to have no chance of Steeplechasing as she stubbornly refused her fences. However, once convinced, she proved an impressive chaser with recent victories at Birmingham and Derby securing her starting price of 4/1. George Stevens was having his eight ride in the race, having previously enjoyed victory in 1856.

Medora completed a trio of mares at the head of the market at 100/12 with Master Bagot at 100/8 and The Dane at 10/1 in a betting market which had been open throughout and had seen several horses gain and lose favouritism.

== The Race ==
The sixteen runners were sent off from their new starting position with Medora the first to show while The Orphan bucked at the start and Birdbolt was left and well adrift of the others even before reaching the first fence. Inkermans rider was seen to be having difficulty controlling his mount and there was little surprise when he was the first to exit the contest with a fall at the second fence. The horse would continue riderless for over a circuit before bolting off into the countryside and requiring a search of many hours before being found at a farm almost four miles away.

Going down to Becher's for the first time The Freshman took up the running with Yaller Gal, Arbury and Jealousy now heading Medora, with The Dane and Master Bagot forming the front rank but in a tightly bunched front group it was Master Bagot and Medora again who took up the running along the Canal side of the course and back in view of the Grand Stands.

As was the custom of the race, the leading horses took a pull on the long run to the Gorsed hurdle, enabling those tailing at the rare to bunch up and all the fifteen survivors were in close order taking the fence, which had claimed the life of Joe Wynne the previous year. Medora, Jelousy, The Dane, Master Bagot and Yaller Gal were all in close order over the fence while sixth placed The Orphan appeared unsighted and took a heavy fall, leaving Fosco to lead the chasing pack over.

At the Artificial Brook the favourite led to the cheers of the crowd while second placed Medora blundered and dropped back behind Master Bagot, The Dane, Emblem, Yaller Gal, Light Of Other Days and Arbury, close up behind came Fosco, The Freshman, Telegraph, Avalanche, Real Jam and Birdbolt who had been well to the rear throughout.

Going out into the second circuit Telegraph began to move closer, only to hit the third fence hard and suffer a heavy fall, which required the quick assistance of the vet to end the horses suffering.

At second Becher's Yaller Gal took up the running, with a 2 length lead to Arbury, Emblem, Light Of Other Days, The Dane and the weakening Jealousy, Medora was next with Master Bagot who was showing the first signs of breaking down and was passed on the way to the Extreme Turn by Fosco, Avalanche and The Freshman, despite all three appearing to also be in distress while Real Jam was now looking exhausted and Birdbolt sensibly pulled up at this point.

There were effectively only six still racing as they came along the Canal side with Yaller Gal heading Arbury, Jealousy who appeared to be gaining a second wind ahead of Emblem, The Dane and Light Of Other Days

Crossing the lane onto the racecourse Emblem and Arbury stretched their four rivals with the mare going the better of the two. However, the victory she looked on course for was almost stolen away at the last hurdle with an untidy jump that offered Alec Goodman on Arbury a glimmer of hope, which was just as quickly extinguished when his mount stumbled through the gap left by Emblem and lost their own momentum.

From there the result was assured as Emblem stretched away to win by a comfortable 20 lengths, Yaller Gal was a further ten lengths back in third, 2 lengths up on the fast finishing Fosco. Avalanche was a further thirty yards adrift, having passed the exhausted Jealousy on the run in. The Freshamn, Light Of Other Days and Medora all walked in having pulled up before the final hurdle while the badly lamed Master Bagot was walked in by his rider with Real Jam and Birdbolt.

== Finishing Order ==
Position	Name	Jockey	Handicap (st-lb)	SP	Distance	Colours
Winner	Emblem	George Stevens	10-10	4-1	11 mins 20 secs	Brown, light blue cap
Second	Arbury	Alec Goodman	11-2	25-1	20 lengths	Buff, blue cap
Third	Yaller Gal	Dixon	10-13	20-1	10 lengths	Rose, green sleeves, black cap
Fourth	Fosco	George Holman	9-11	40-1	2 lengths	Black, white sleeves, black cap
Fifth	Avalanche	George Palmer	10-9	33-1	Thirty yards	Blue, white piping, black cap
Sixth	Jealousy	Joe Kendall	11-10	3-1 Fav	Last to finish	White, burgundy sash, black cap
Fence 27 {Final Hurdle}	The Dane	Walter White	11-6	10-1	Pulled Up	White
Fence 27 {Final Hurdle}	The Freshman	George Ede	11-13	50-1	Pulled up	Blue, tartan sash, red cap
Fence 27 {Final Hurdle}	Light of Other Days	John Nightingall	10-4	20-1	Pulled up	Black, rose cap
Fence 27 {Final Hurdle}	Medora	Fogo Rowlands	12-0	100-12	Pulled Up lame	Buff, silver sleeves, red cap
Fence 27 {Final Hurdle}	Real Jam	David Hughes	9-11	20-1	Pulled up	Light blue, orange cap
Fence 23 {Valentine's Brook}	Master Bagot	James Knott	10-4	100-8	Pulled up, Broke down	Red and white stripes, black cap
Fence 22 {Extreme Turn}	Birdbolt	T. Spence	9-11	50-1	Pulled Up	Violet, black cap
Fence 17 {Post & Rails}	Telegraph	George Waddington	9-11	50-1	Fell	Green, black cap
Fence 13 {Gorsed Hurdle}	The Orphan	William Bevill	9-11	50-1	Fell	Red, white cap
Fence 2 {Hedge, Ditch & Cop}	Inkerman	Parnaby Smith	9-11	50-1	Fell	Black, yellow sleeves, white cap
