= George Stevens (jockey) =

English jockey

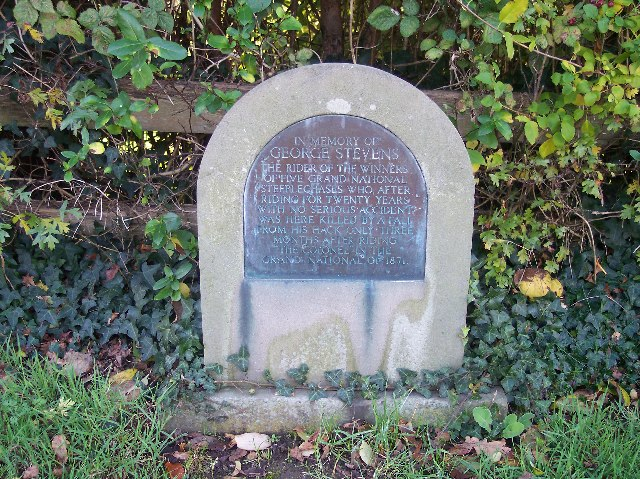

Personal information
- Born: 12 June 1833 Cheltenham, England
- Died: 2 June 1871 (aged 37) Cleeve Hill, England
- Occupation: Jockey

Horse racing career
- Sport: Horse racing
- Career wins: 76

Major racing wins
- Major wins as jockey: Grand National; 5 times (1856, 1863, 1864, 1869, 1870)

Significant horses
- Freetrader; Emblem; Emblematic; The Colonel

George Stevens (12 June 1833, Cheltenham – 2 June 1871, Cleeve Hill) was an English jockey, famous for having the most wins in the Grand National.

Stevens began his riding career at the age of 16 or 17. He rode Hardwick to victory in the Grand Annual steeple chase at Wolverhampton in 1851. From the beginning of 1848 to the end of 1870 he won 76 races. He rode 5 Grand National winners: Freetrader, 1856; Emblem 1863; Emblematic, 1864; The Colonel, 1869, 1870. He died on 2 June 1871 after suffering a skull fracture the previous day; his horse stumbled and threw him after bolting as Stevens was quietly riding home to his cottage on Cleeve Hill.
