= List of equine fatalities in the Grand National =

Horse deaths at Aintree since 1839

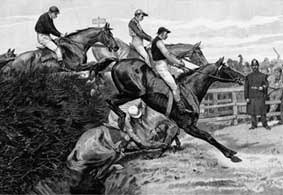
Becher's Brook, historically the most dangerous fence. By William Barnes Wollen, 1890.

This is a list of equine fatalities in the Grand National (88 as of 2024), an annual steeplechase horse racing event held at Aintree Racecourse near Liverpool. The Grand National is a National Hunt handicap race that is held over a distance of 4 miles and 3½ furlongs, with a field of 34 horses jumping 30 fences.

According to the British Horseracing Authority, modern steeplechase races have an average of just over 4 equine fatalities for every 1,000 horses taking part in a race. The Aintree Grand National yielded 7 equine fatalities out of 439 horses taking part between 2000 and 2010, a rate of almost 16 equine fatalities per 1,000 horses taking part (or 0.64 fatalities per race of 40 horses). In the five years to 2023, the fatality rate has risen by one-third, averaging 25 equine fatalities per 1,000 horses taking part (or one fatality per race of 40 horses).

== Background ==
The high number of equine deaths in the Aintree Grand National race has made it a focus for animal rights activists. While course officials have taken safety measures over the years, such as improving veterinary facilities and reducing the severity of fences, some campaign for further modifications and even the abolition of the event that was inaugurated in 1839.

After the 1989 Grand National, in which two horses died in incidents at Becher's Brook (the sixth and 22nd fence on the course), Aintree began making significant changes to the fences that are jumped during the National. The brook on the landing-side of Becher's was filled in to prevent horses rolling back into it, and the incline on the landing-side has been mostly levelled out, whilst retaining a drop to slow the runners. Other fences have been reduced in height, toe-boards have been made taller, and the entry requirements for participating horses have been made stricter, such as the requirement for runners to have been placed fourth or better in a previously recognised steeplechase over a distance of at least three miles.

Some within the horseracing community, including some with notable achievements in the Grand National, such as Ginger McCain and Bob Champion, have argued that the lowering of fences and the narrowing of ditches, primarily designed to increase horse safety, has had the adverse effect by encouraging the runners to race faster. During the 1970s and 1980s, the Grand National saw a total of 12 horses die (half of which were at Becher's Brook); in the next 20-year period from 1990 to 2010, when modifications to the course were most significant, there were 17 equine fatalities.

== List of fatalities ==
The animal welfare charity League Against Cruel Sports counts the number of horse deaths at 40 over the three-day meet from the year 2000 to 2013. The following list details the equine fatalities during, or as a direct result of participating in, the Grand National, that is, the showpiece steeplechase itself rather than all the various races held over the entire three-day "Grand National meeting" (which includes two other races over one circuit of the National course: the Fox Hunters for amateur jockeys and the Topham for professional jockeys).

The list includes, where applicable and where known, the fence at which the fatality occurred. The

Year	Horse	Fence No.	Fate	Going	Ran	Details	Source
2025	Celebre D'Allen	While running	Pulled up	Good-soft	34	Pulled up on the run-in, died two days later. Jockey Micheal Nolan was given a ten-day ban prior to the horse's death for continuing to race despite the horse showing signs of tiring.	
2023	Hill Sixteen	1	Fell	Good	39	Fell at first and sustained "unrecoverable injury". The fence was skipped on the second lap.	.
2022	Eclair Surf	3 (& 19)	Fell	Good-soft	40	Fell at 3rd fence, was stabilised and taken back to the stables, only to be euthanised the day after due to head trauma.	
2022	Discorama	While running	Pulled up	Good-soft	40	Pulled up before the 13th fence, was found to have incurred a pelvic injury and was euthanised.	
2021	The Long Mile	While running	Pulled up	Good-soft	40	Was euthanised after the race.	
2019	Up For Review	1	Brought down	Good-soft	40	Jumped successfully but was brought down by another fallen horse. The fence was skipped in the subsequent lap.	
2012	Synchronised	11 (& 26)	Fell	Good	40	Fell at Becher's Brook but continued running riderless until the 11th fence where he fractured his right-hind tibia and fibula and was euthanised.	
2012	According to Pete	(6 &) 21	Brought down	Good	40	Fractured his left-fore humerus and was euthanised as a result of the fall on the second lap at Becher's Brook. Was the 21st fence because the fifth fence was skipped on the second lap as a jockey was being treated after falling during the first lap.	
2011	Ornais	4	Fell	Good	40	Incurred a cervical fracture upon falling and died. Under a new rule implemented, the horses skipped this fence on the next lap.	
2011	Dooneys Gate	6	Fell	Good	40	Fractured his thoracolumbar upon falling and was euthanised. Horses skipped this fence on the second lap.	
2009	Hear The Echo	While running	Collapsed	Good-soft	40	Collapsed on the run-in and died.	
2008	McKelvey	While running riderless	Collided with barrier	Good	40	Unseated rider at 20th fence and continued running riderless until he collided with railings, was unable to regain his feet due to injuries, and was euthanised.	
2007	Graphic Approach	While running riderless	Collapsed	Good	40	Fell at Becher's Brook but continued running riderless before collapsing with concussion; he was euthanised several days later.	
2006	Tyneandthyneagain	1 (& 17)	Fell	Good-soft	40	Continued running riderless until falling later, was diagnosed with a spinal injury and was euthanised.	
2003	Goguenard	(3 &) 19	Brought down	Good	40	Injured in a mêlée by another falling horse and was euthanised.	
2002	The Last Fling	(8 &) 24	Fell	Good	40	Broke his back upon falling and died.	
2002	Manx Magic	(4 &) 20	Fell	Good	40	Incurred a cervical fracture upon falling and died.	
1999	Eudipe	(6 &) 22	Fell	Good	32	Broke his back upon falling and was euthanised.	
1998	Pashto	1 (& 17)	Fell	Heavy	37	Collapsed after falling and was euthanised.	
1998	Do Rightly	4 (& 20)	Fell	Heavy	37	Suffered a heart attack whilst jumping the fence.	
1998	Griffins Bar	While running	Fell	Heavy	37	Incurred a shoulder fracture after jumping the fifth fence and fell; later was euthanised.	
1997	Straight Talk	14 (& 30)	Fell	Good	36	Incurred a leg fracture upon falling and was euthanised.	
1997	Smith's Band	(4 &) 20	Fell	Good	36	Incurred a cervical fracture upon falling and died.	
1996	Rust Never Sleeps	While running	Pulled up	Good	27	Pulled up lame before the 13th fence, diagnosed with a broken shoulder and euthanised.	
1991	Ballyhane	After finishing	Collapsed	Good-soft	40	Suffered a haemorrhage after completing the race and died.	
1990	Roll-A-Joint	8 (& 24)	Fell	Firm	38	Incurred a cervical fracture upon falling and died.	
1990	Hungary Hur	While running	Pulled up	Firm	38	Incurred a leg fracture while running towards the 19th fence, pulled up and euthanised.	
1989	Brown Trix	6 (& 22)	Fell	Heavy	40	Incurred a shoulder fracture upon falling.	
1989	Seeandem	6 (& 22)	Fell	Heavy	40	Broke his back upon falling and died.	
1987	Dark Ivy	6 (& 22)	Fell	Good	40	Incurred a cervical fracture upon falling and died.	
1984	Earthstopper	After finishing	Collapsed	Good	40	Collapsed and died after finishing the race.	
1983	Duncreggan	8 (& 24)	Fell	Soft	41	Injured in fall and later euthanised.	
1982	Again The Same	8 (& 24)	Pulled up		39	Upon his return home the horse was found to have broken a bone in his knee and was euthanised.	
1979	Kintai	15	Brought down	Good	34	Injured in fall and later euthanised.	
1979	Alverton	(6 &) 22	Fell	Good	34	Incurred a cervical fracture upon falling and died.	
1978	Rag Trade	While running	Pulled up	Firm	37	Pulled up lame before the 21st fence and later euthanised.	
1977	Winter Rain	6 (& 22)	Fell	Good	42	Injured in fall and later euthanised.	
1977	Zeta's Son	(9 &) 25	Fell	Good	42	Injured in fall and later euthanised.	
1975	Land Lark	15	Fell	Good	31	Suffered a heart attack while jumping the fence.	
1975	Beau Bob	(6 &) 22	Fell	Good	31	Incurred a cervical fracture upon falling and died.	
1973	Grey Sombrero	15	Fell	Firm	38	Incurred a shoulder fracture upon falling and was euthanised.	
1970	Racoon	3 (& 19)	Fell	Good	28	Incurred a cervical fracture upon falling and was euthanised.	
1967	Vulcano	3 (& 19)	Fell	Good	44	Injured in fall and euthanised.	
1960	Belsize II	(4 &) 20	Fell	Good	26	Injured in fall and euthanised with a suspected cervical fracture.	
1959	Slippery Serpent	13 (& 29)	Fell	Good	34	Broke a leg bone, which was initially treated, however was euthanised three days later.	
1959	Henry Purcell	6 (& 22)	Fell	Good	34	Broke his back upon falling and was euthanised.	
1954	Dominick's Bar	2 (& 18)	Fell	Soft	29	Suffered a heart attack while jumping the fence.	
1954	Paris New York	4 (& 20)	Fell	Soft	29	Incurred a cervical fracture upon falling and died.	
1954	Legal Joy	13 (& 29)	Fell	Soft	29	Broke a leg in a fall and was euthanised.	
1954	Coneyburrow	(12 &) 28	Fell	Soft	29	Injured in a fall and later euthanised.	
1953	Cardinal Error	4 (& 20)	Fell	Good	31	Injured or possibly killed in a fall.	
1953	Parasol II	8 (& 24)	Fell	Good	31	Injured in a fall and later euthanised.	
1952	Skouras	6 (& 22)	Fell	Good-firm	47	Incurred a cervical fracture upon falling and was euthanised.	
1950	Limestone Cottage	8 (& 24)	Fell	Good	49	Injured in fall.	
1946	Symbole	6 (& 22)	Fell	Good	34	Incurred a cervical fracture upon falling and died.	
1940	Second Act	16	Injured on landing	Good	32		
1938	Cabin Fire	8 (& 24)	Fell	Good	36		
1938	Rock Lad	16	Injured on landing	Good	36		
1936	Avenger	(1 &) 17	Fell	Good	36	Incurred a cervical fracture and was euthanised.	
1931	Swift Roland	6 (& 22)	Fell	"Perfect"	43	Incurred a cervical fracture upon falling and died..	
1931	Drin	8 (& 24)	Fell	"Perfect"	43	Incurred a leg fracture and was euthanised.	
1930	Derby Day	4 (and 20)	Fell	"Perfect"	41	Incurred a cervical fracture upon falling and died.	
1929	Stort	11 (and 27)	Fell	"Average"	66	fell at the 11th running loose, incurred a cervical fracture upon falling and died.	
1926	Lone Hand		Fell	Good	30		
1922	The Inca	6 (& 22)	Fell	Good	32	Incurred a leg fracture and was euthanised.	
1922	Awbeg	8 (& 24)	Fell	Good	32	Incurred a cervical fracture upon falling and died.	
1907	Kilts	1 (& 17)	Fell	Good	23		
1901	True Blue		Fell	Snow	24		
1891	The Emperor	While running	Fell	Good	21	Having been pulled up, fell and broke his back while running back to the stables.	
1882	Wild Monarch		Fell	Heavy	12		
1875	Laburnam	{23} Penultimate Hurdle	Broke Down and Pulled Up		19	Was taken from the course and placed in the care of a vet for two weeks after the race before being euthanised	
1872	Primrose	(15} Ditch & Bank - Fan	Fell	Hard	25	Broke her back in a fall, which brought down two other runners.	
1871	Lord Raglan	{12} Table	Pulled Up	"Perfect"	25	Caught a fetlock in a gully and broke it. Immediately pulled up and euthanised	
1869	Huntsman's Daughter	{26} Penultimate Hurdle	Broke Down	"Average"	22	Broke a fetlock when standing on a hurdle broken down by the horse in front Was pulled up and walked back to the stables and euthanised.	
1868	Chimney Sweep	Crossing the lane [future Melling Road]	Struck a boulder marking the lane	Heavy	21	Shattered a pastern in five places after striking a boulder marking the lane before the first fence. Was buried where he fell.	
1863	Telegraph	Fence 17 {Post & Rails}	Fell	Good	16	Injured in fall and was euthanised.	
1861	The Conductor	Fence 8 {Canal Turn}	Fell	"Average"	24	Injured in mêlée and was euthanised.	
1857	Garry Owen	Fence 17 {Bank}	Fell	Heavy	28	Ruptured his loins. {Broken back}	
1857	Albatross	Fence 15 {The Chair}	Pulled up	Heavy	28	Burst a blood vessel	
1856	Banstead	Fence 17 [Bank]	Fell	"Average"	21	Dislocated a shoulder and euthanised	
1855	Miss Mowbray	Fence 20 {Bechers Brook}	Fell	Heavy	20	fell heavily, breaking her neck and back and was killed instantly.	
1854	Bedford	24 Valentines Brook	Fell	Good	20	Injured in fall and was euthanised.	
1849	The Curate	18 Earth Bank	Fell	Heavy	24	Fell and suffered a broken leg, euthanised	
1849	Equinox	17 Earth Bank	Fell	Heavy	24	Injured in melee and euthanised.	
1849	Kilfane	3 Earth Bank	Fell	Heavy	24	Landed on by another horse and broke a leg, euthanised	
1848	Counsellor	Fence {28} penultimate fence Canal side 2nd time	Pulled Up	Heavy	29	Broke down	
1848	The Sailor	Fence {19} {Fence before Becher's}	Fell	Heavy	29	Suffered either a leg or spine fracture in heavy fall	
1848	Blue Pill	Crossing Mess Lane, 2nd circuit [now known as Anchor Bridge Lane}	Broke Down, Pulled Up	Heavy	29	Broke down after crossing Melling road for the final time	
1845	Clansman	The fence by the distance Chair {The Chair}	Fell	Heavy	16	Fatally injured in fall.	
1839	Dictator	The Second Brook {Valentines}	Fell	Heavy	17	Burst blood vessel.	

Note that the modern course was only formally laid in the 1880s and that prior to that, many of the fences weren't situated in their current positions. The fence number given is that of the race in that year and may no longer correspond to the same fence on the course today. Famous fences on the course are named to identify them when possible.

== Summary by fence ==
The following table summarises the total number of equine fatalities by each of the 16 fences on the course, and includes the current height of each.

Fence No.	Current height (feet and inches)	No. of fatalities
1 & 17	4'06"	5
2 & 18	4'07"	4
3 & 19 (open ditch)	4'10"	4
4 & 20	4'10"	8
5 & 21	5'00"	1
6 & 22 (Becher's Brook)	5'00"	14
7 & 23 (Foinavon)	4'06"	0
8 & 24 (Canal Turn)	5'00"	7
9 & 25 (Valentine's)	5'00"	4
10 & 26	5'00"	0
11 & 27 (open ditch)	5'00"	0
12 & 28	5'00"	1
13 & 29	4'07"	1
14 & 30	4'06"	1
15 (The Chair)	5'02"	3
16 (Water Jump)	2'06"	0

== See also ==
- Animal rights movement
- Overview of the Grand National fences
