= Brendan's Cottage =

British-bred Thoroughbred racehorse

- Sire: Cottage
- Grandsire: Tracery
- Dam: Brendan's Glory
- Damsire: St Brendan
- Sex: Gelding
- Foaled: 1930
- Country: United Kingdom
- Colour: Bay
- Owner: Jean Smith-Bingham
- Trainer: George Beeby

Major wins
- Cheltenham Gold Cup (1939)

Brendan's Cottage (1930–1940) was a British Thoroughbred racehorse who won the 1939 Cheltenham Gold Cup. After beginning his career in flat racing he developed into a top-class steeplechaser and won the Gold Cup by defeating the odds-on favourite Morse Code. He never won again and died a year later at the age of 10.

== Background ==
Brendan's Cottage was a bay gelding bred in the United Kingdom. He was sired by Cottage, an unsuccessful racehorse who became an outstanding National Hunt stallion. His other offspring included Cottage Rake and the Grand National winners Workman, Lovely Cottage and Sheila's Cottage. Brendan's Cottage's dam Brendan's Glory, was distantly descended from the influential Irish broodmare Caprice.

During his racing career, Brendan's Cottage was owned by Jean Smith-Bingham and trained by George Beeby. Beeby trained the horse at Melton Mowbray before moving to Hamilton House at Compton in Berkshire.

== Racing career ==
Brendan's Cottage began his racing career on the flat, winning as a two-year-old in 1932. He later switched to steeplechasing and won at Aintree Racecourse in November 1937. He was entered in the 1938 Grand National although he did not run in the race.

On 9 March 1939 Brendan's Cottage, having run promisingly at Gatwick Racecourse on his previous start, was one of five horses to contest the fourteenth running of the Cheltenham Gold Cup. Morse Code the winner of the race in 1938 was made the 4/7 favourite ahead of Bel et Bon on 11/4 with Brendan's Cottage, ridden by George Owen, third choice in the betting on 8/1. The other two runners, L'Estaque (ridden by Harry Llewellyn) and Embarrassed were given little chance. The race was run at a slow pace with the runners closely grouped until Brendan's Cottage and Morse Code broke away from their opponents on the second circuit. The favourite led until the last fence but was being hard ridden whilst Brendan's Cottage was traveling easily. Brendan's Cottage took the lead at the final obstacle and drew away on the run-in to win by five lengths. In the 1939 Grand National just over two weeks later Brendan's Cottage who carried 156 pounds and started at odds of 25/1. He looked to be in good condition before the race but fell at the first fence.

Brendan's Cottage sustained a serious leg injury in the following season and died in 1940.

== Assessment and honours ==
In their book, A Century of Champions, based on the Timeform rating system, John Randall and Tony Morris rated Brendan's Cottage a "poor" Gold Cup winner.

== Pedigree ==
Pedigree of Brendan's Cottage (GB), bay gelding, 1930
| Sire Cottage (GB) 1918 | Tracery (USA); 1909 | Rock Sand | Sainfoin |
| Sire Cottage (GB) 1918 | Tracery (USA); 1909 | Rock Sand | Roquebrune |
| Sire Cottage (GB) 1918 | Tracery (USA); 1909 | Topiary | Orme |
| Sire Cottage (GB) 1918 | Tracery (USA); 1909 | Topiary | Plaisanterie |
| Sire Cottage (GB) 1918 | Casetta (GB); 1910 | Marco | Barcaldine |
| Sire Cottage (GB) 1918 | Casetta (GB); 1910 | Marco | Novitiate |
| Sire Cottage (GB) 1918 | Casetta (GB); 1910 | Creme Simon | St Simon |
| Sire Cottage (GB) 1918 | Casetta (GB); 1910 | Creme Simon | Settlement |
| Dam Brendan's Glory (IRE) 1915 | St Brendan (IRE); 1899 | Hackler | Petrarch |
| Dam Brendan's Glory (IRE) 1915 | St Brendan (IRE); 1899 | Hackler | Hackness |
| Dam Brendan's Glory (IRE) 1915 | St Brendan (IRE); 1899 | Court Card | Royal Hampton |
| Dam Brendan's Glory (IRE) 1915 | St Brendan (IRE); 1899 | Court Card | Bendlet |
| Dam Brendan's Glory (IRE) 1915 | Strategy (IRE); 1899 | Circassian | Camballo |
| Dam Brendan's Glory (IRE) 1915 | Strategy (IRE); 1899 | Circassian | Lais |
| Dam Brendan's Glory (IRE) 1915 | Strategy (IRE); 1899 | Policy | Atheling |
| Dam Brendan's Glory (IRE) 1915 | Strategy (IRE); 1899 | Policy | Lady Pitt (Family: 22) |
