= 1850 Grand National =

English steeplechase horse race

- Grand National
- Location: Aintree
- Date: 27 February 1850
- Winning horse: (Ireland) Abd-El-Kader
- Starting price: unquoted
- Jockey: Chris Green
- Trainer: Joseph Osborne
- Owner: Joseph Osborne
- Conditions: Good

The 1850 Grand National was, at the time, the 15th annual running of a handicap steeplechase horse race at Aintree Racecourse near Liverpool, England on Wednesday, 27 February 1850. It was later retrospectively recorded as the twelfth official running in 1864. It attracted a then record field of thirty-two runners and was won by the unconsidered Irish entrant, Abd El Kader.

== The Course ==
Start - Beyond the lane leading away from the course. Fence 1 {17} Had previously been an eighteen-inch bank but was now shored up with sturdy planks, Fences 2 {18} and 3 {19}, Fence 4 {20} Post and rails, Fence 5 {21} Becher's Brook, Fence 6 {22} Ditch and rails, Fence 7 {23} A double hedge with brook, Fence 8 {24} A water jump, Fence 9 {25} The Canal Brook, Fence 10 {26} A hedge and gate. A post and rails situated between the brook and hedge removed this year, Fence 11 {27} Post and rails, Fence 12 {28} A ditch, Fence 13 {29} A hedge at Canal Bridge, Fence 14 Thorn Fence at the distance chair in front of the stands, Fence 15 Artificial Brook, Fence 16 Sunken Lane, was now referred to as Proceed's Lane after the horse who refused here in both the Autumn 1848 meeting and then again in the 1849 Grand National when leading in both races. Fence 30 Gorsed Hurdle.

== Leading Contenders ==
Peter Simple was the long time favourite of the general public on the back of his winning the 1849 Grand National although there seemed to be some confusion over his ownership as most contemporary reports differ as to whose colours he was to carry. His trainer Tom Cunningham remained in the saddle, as he had been last year in victory. Contemporary reports stated that, in what proved to be Cunningham's second and final ride in the race, Peter Simple finished the race. His race almost came to an end when refusing at the first fence, an earth bank, which this year had been shored up by still planks. However, Cunningham quickly got the horse back into the race and back into contention by the end of the first circuit. The effort required appeared to take its toll as the favourite was unable to maintain a challenge on re-entering the race course for the final time, with Cunningham pulling up before reaching the hurdles on the course.

Sir John Was backed down to 7/1 to win in the colours of Lord Waterford, who himself had ridden in the 1840 Grand National and provided John Ryan with the best backed mount of the seventeen riders making their debut in the race. Considered the best of the Irish entries, the public faith in him stemmed from having performed well at the previous Autumn's Aintree meeting. Ryan brought Sir John up to challenge the leader at the final hurdle, only to be nearly brought down when hitting the rebounding panel dislodged by Abd El Kader moments earlier. Unable to regain his momentum, Sir John was beaten into third.

Rat Trap or Rattrap, as it was listed in some contemporary reports was the mount of John Frisby and was quoted at 9/1 on the course. The partnership was still in contention when coming into collision with Chandler at the fence before Becher's second time, both horses falling.

The Victim was quoted at 12/1 by bookmakers and betting rooms. With former winning jockey, William Taylor in the saddle, the horse lived up to its name by being the victim of a congested run to the first fence, running out when Peter Simple in front of him refused.

The Knight of Gwynne had finished second the previous year so was naturally well supported to improve on that performance. The horse this year ran in the colours of a Mr Fort and so had a new rider with the 1847 winning jockey, Denny Wynne. The 12/1 shot again put in a good showing and was poised to challenge the leader when the horse broke down. Despite this, Wynne was still able to nurse The Knight home just half a length down on the winner.

The only other competitors that came under the consideration of the Bookmakers were Farnham, who was considered a doubtful starter, and Vengeance at 13/1, The 1848 winner Chandler was at 16/1 with Columbine, Maria Day, Little Fanny and The Oaks attracting the lesser public money.

Abd El Kader lay among the "any price these others" category. Though this was mostly due to his appearance at the starting gate being thought unlikely after a poor showing in his prep race at Lincoln the previous week. 15/1 had been offered prior to this, suggesting the bookmakers at least considered him worthy of consideration. With Chris Green in the saddle they began attracting attention during the race with Bookmakers offering odds of 30/1 in running until it became gradually clear that the Irish entry might stay the course and win, although some may have mistaken his yellow colours for the white and yellow of Little Fanny. The tiny bay gelding, Known as "Little Ab" due to his diminutive stature, was almost carried out at second Becher's by the loose running Hope but ultimately benefitted both by the loose horse hampering other rivals and by good fortune at the final hurdle. Despite clattering the obstacle, the panel sprung back up with such force that it hampered second placed Sir John while third placed The Knight of Gwynne broke down on the run in to allow Little Ab to hold on by half a length.

== Handicap controversy ==
When the weights were announced, there was a deal of controversy raised at several competitors being allocated weights below nine stone to carry, while top weight, Peter Simple would carry 12 stone 2 lbs. In one letter, published to Bell's Life, a writer highlighted this, stating that the top weight should be increased to thirteen stone, as horses a decade earlier had often been asked to shoulder. In turn, the weaker horses should be asked to carry at least nine stone 7 lbs. Only two of the thirty-two who faced the starter carried less than nine stone.

== The Race ==
Starter, Lord Sefton received high praise from the press for ensuring the record field of runners got off to a clean start in two rows. However, there was quickly a lot of congestion going to the first fence where Peter Simple refused and in doing so hampered The Oaks, The Victim and Spring Buck, one falling, one running out and one refusing.

The remainder of the field continued without incident until reaching the fence after the Canal side brook where Rainbow was crowded out and forced into a gate with jockey James Daly suffering a broken thigh either in the collision or the bad fall that followed. Two fences later Hope, fell, the horse continuing loose and almost carrying the two leaders, Little Fanny and Quadruped out as they tried to turn on to the racecourse to make their way in front of the stands.

Vengeance took up the lead but in trying to stay clear of the loose, Hope made an untidy jump at the artificial brook, followed by Little Fanny, Quadruped, The Knight of Gwynne, Johnnie Barrie, Farnham, Sir John and Abd El Kadar, followed by the main body of runners headed by Shinrone, Rat Trap and Chandler with British Yeoman and Sobriety bringing up the rear.

The misbehaving Hope continued to be a menace for the leading riders as they set off on the second circuit, hampering Vengeance at the third fence after the Sunken Lane where Chandler and Rat Trap both fell.

This now left Abd El Kader and Little Fanny at the head of the race going to Becher's, both jockeys still being harassed by the loose horse, who swerved and fell into the Brook, carrying Little Fanny out in the process. Abd El Kader had almost also been carried out but just managed to clear the brook and remain in the lead, now untroubled by the loose horse going to the Canal side of the course with Tipperary Boy, Farnham, The Knight of Gwynne and Sir John the main challengers, followed by Vengeance, Shinrone, Maria Day, Mulligan and Peter Simple and the remainder tailed off.

Abd El Kader increased the pace along the Canal side, opening up a lead of a few lengths over Tipperary Boy and as he turned towards the straight at the top of the course his yellow silks were confused by at least one bookmaker to be the white and yellow of Little Fanny, offering 100/30 in running against the leader.

Tipperary Boy was unable to make any impression on the leader, giving way to Sir John and The Knight of Gwynne approaching the final hurdle. Abd El Kader offered hope to his rivals when clattering through it, only for the panel to swing into the path of Sir John, almost bringing him down and ending his chance.

The Knight of Gwynne cleared the hurdle safely and mounted a challenge to the leader, but Denny Wynne quickly noticed that his mount had lost his action. Realising his horse had broken down, Wynne could only nurse the horse up the straight, leaving Abd El Kader to claim victory by half a length. Sir John was six lengths back in third while Tipperary Boy cantered in a further six lengths down in fourth. Only Farnham, Maria Day and Vengeance kept up the chase behind, the remainder pulling up at the top of the course when their respective chances of victory were over.

== Finishing order ==
Only the first three to complete the course were officially recorded as finishers, the remainder merely being listed as having also ran. Reporters in the press were often at odds with each other as to their fate. The most detailed account of the race was given by Bells Life, the sporting trade paper of the time and was in accord with the majority of conflicting accounts in other contemporary press reports.

The official records for Aintree racecourse state that the winner completed the course in a time of 9 minutes 57 seconds, making this the first sub ten minute Grand National. The reporter from Bell's life reported that this time was taken by three timekeepers.

position	name	rider	age	weight	starting price	distance or fate	Colours
1st	Abd-El-Kader	Chris Green	8	9-12	30/1*	9m 57.5s	Yellow
2nd	The Knight of Gwynne	Denny Wynne		11-08	12/1	Half a length	
3rd	Sir John	Johnny Ryan		11-08	7/1	Six lengths	Light blue, black cap
4th	Tipperary Boy	Sam Darling	6	10-00	unquoted	Six lengths	
5th	Farnham	Tom Abbott	6	11-03	15/1		Navy, plum cap
6th	Maria Day	Harry Rackley		10-05	25/1		
7th	Vengeance	William Archer		9-10	15/1		Purple with light blue sleeves, black cap
Non Finishers
Home turn second circuit	Peter Simple	Tom Cunningham	12	12-02	5/1 favourite	Refused fence 1, continued and got back in contention before pulling up	Cerise with light blue sleeves and cap
Home turn second circuit	Mulligan	Captain John Westropp	6	10-10	unquoted	Pulled up and walked in	
Home turn second circuit	Shinrone	Henry Bradley	6	10-05	unquoted	Pulled up and walked in	Scarlet, black cap
Home turn second circuit	Meath	J Neale		10-10	11/1	Pulled up	White, scarlet sleeves, white cap
Fence 21 Becher's Brook	Little Fanny	W Fowler		9-00	25/1	Carried out	White, yellow sleeves and cap
Fence 21 Becher's Brook	Columbine	Tom Olliver		10-04	20/1	Tailed off	
Fence 21 Becher's Brook	Everton	A Salt		10-08	unquoted	Tailed off	Scarlet, black cap
Fence 21 Becher's Brook	Fisticuff	Edwin Parr		10-00	unquoted	Tailed off	Buff, blue cap
Fence 21 Becher's Brook	Johnnie Barrie	R. Maitland		9-00 {9-11}	unquoted	Tailed off	White, scarlet sleeves, black cap
Fence 21 Becher's Brook	Kilkenny	William Holman		9-10	unquoted	Tailed off	Light blue, scarlet sleeves, red cap
Fence 21 Becher's Brook	Bay Gelding By Laurel	John Butler		10-08	unquoted	Tailed off	Black, yellow sleeves and cap
Fence 21 Becher's Brook	Quadruped	George Arran		10-08	unquoted	Tailed off	White, blue sleeves and cap
Fence 21 Becher's Brook	Pegasus	John Tasker		8-10	unquoted	Tailed off	Black, white sleeves, black cap
Fence 21 Becher's Brook	Rory-Be-Aisy	Magee	5	10-10	unquoted	Tailed off	Lilac and white stripes, white cap
Fence 21 Becher's Brook	Sobriety	J Thompson		10-04	unquoted	Tailed off	Light blue and cerise stripes, light blue cap with cerise pinstripe
Fence 21 Becher's Brook	The British Yeoman	Philpot		11-10	unquoted	Tailed off	Scarlet, black cap
Fence 21 Becher's Brook	The Iron Duke	John Hanlon	5	10-12	unquoted	Tailed off	Scarlet, black cap
Fence 21, Becher's Brook	The Pony	Dan Meaney		8-07	unquoted	Tailed off	White, black cap
Fence 20 Earth bank	Chandler	Josey Little	14	11-03	16/1	Collided and fell	Light blue, white cap
Fence 20 Earth bank	Rat Trap	John Frisby		11-07	9/1	Collided and fell	Buff and pale blue stripes, black cap
Fence 12 Canal side	Hope	Hunter		9-12	33/1	Fell	Purple, black cap
Fence 10 Canal side	Rainbow	James Daly		10-08	unquoted	Fell at a gate beside the fence	
Fence 1 Stiff planks	Spring Buck	T Smith		10-12	unquoted	Refused	Scarlet and white stripes, black cap
Fence 1 Stiff planks	The Oaks	Charley Canavan	5	10-05	30/1	Baulked & Fell	Scarlet, white cap
Fence 1 Stiff planks	The Victim	William Taylor		11-02	12/1	Ran out, continued tailed off into second circuit	Scarlet, black cap

- Abd El Kader wasn't quoted on the course but 30/1 was being offered in the betting rooms of Liverpool and Manchester.

== Aftermath ==
In a year where the Irish press had been downbeat regarding the chances of their entries there was a little surprise at the winner and third both coming from across the Irish Sea.

Abd El Kader hadn't been expected to run at all after a poor showing at Lincoln the previous week and was considered a slightly fortunate winner, having survived smashing through the final hurdle, which then swung back so violently it hit Sir John mid flight when about to lay down his challenge, causing the eventual third placed to be almost brought down and unable to regain his momentum. Jockey Johhny Ryan would recall that his mount was full of running and was about to overhaul the eventual winner when the incident occurred. Owner, Lord Waterford was first to console him, saying "Well done Johnny! Better luck next time."

Eventual runner up, The Knight of Gwynne was also considered hugely unfortunate when it was discovered the horse had broken down on the run in, yet was still nursed to within half a length of the winner by Denny Wynne.

Winning owner, Joe Osborne responded to suggestions that his horse had been fortunate by stating that 'Little Ab' had cut down one of the "best fields of horses that ever started a Grand National."

The remainder of the horses returned to the stables unscathed, much to the praise of the press after six horses had been killed in the previous two renewals. However, Bristol based jockey, James Daly [sometimes referred to as Dally] suffered a broken thigh when Rainbow crashed into a stone gatepost along the Canal side, and was taken by cab to the Liverpool infirmary. The post would be removed from the course in time for the race in 1851 Contrary to some early reports, Spring buck's rider, Smith, along with all the other jockeys, returned uninjured, while a subscription for Daly's wife and family was immediately set up by Newcombe Mason, which received several contributions.
