= Morse Code (horse) =

British-bred Thoroughbred racehorse

- Sire: The Pilot
- Grandsire: Tracery
- Dam: Heliograph
- Damsire: Heliotrope
- Sex: Gelding
- Foaled: 1929
- Country: United Kingdom
- Colour: Chestnut
- Breeder: Dealtry Charles Part
- Owner: Dealtry Charles Part
- Trainer: Ivor Anthony

Major wins
- Grand Annual Chase (1936); Cheltenham Gold Cup (1938)

Morse Code (foaled 1929) was a British Thoroughbred racehorse who won the 1938 Cheltenham Gold Cup. His Gold Cup victory was achieved at the expense of Golden Miller, who was attempting to win the race for the sixth time. He had previously won the Grand Annual Chase and went on to finish second when odds-on favourite for the Gold Cup in 1939.

== Background ==
Morse Code was a liver chestnut gelding (sometimes oddly described as "bay or chestnut") with a narrow white blaze bred in the United Kingdom by Dealtry Charles Part. During his racing career he was owned by Part and trained by Ivor Anthony at Wroughton in Wiltshire. He was the only horse of any consequence sired by The Pilot, a son of the American-bred Tracery. His dam, Heliograph was descended from the broodmare Encore, making her a distant relative of the Belmont Stakes winners Burgomaster and Johren.

== Racing career ==
Morse Code showed early promise and recorded his first major win when he won the Grand Annual Chase at the Cheltenham Festival. He had no chance to follow up in the following year as the meeting was abandoned. He was seen as a potential Grand National contender but was not entered in the race.

In the 1937/38 National Hunt season Morse Code made steady progress to become regarded as one of the best steeplechasers in Britain. On his final prep race for Cheltenham he finished third to Airgead Sios and Macauley. In the Cheltenham Gold Cup on 10 March he faced Airgead Sios and Macauley again but most of the attention was focused on the eleven-year-old Golden Miller who had won five consecutive runnings of the race from 1932 to 1936. Ridden by Danny Morgan he started the 13/2 fourth choice in the betting in an eight-runner field with Golden Miller going off the 7/4 favourite. The race was run at a slow pace and as the horses approached the second last fence Airgead Sios, Morse Code, Golden Miller and Macauley were closely grouped. Airgead Sios made a bad mistake and hampered Macauley, taking both horses out of contention and leaving Morse Code in front with Golden Miller as his only serious rival. Golden Miller attempted to launch a challenge at the last fence, but Morse code stayed on too strongly for the favourite and won by two lengths, with three lengths back to Macauley in third. Morse Code's victory received a muted response from the 20,000 crowd, with most of the cheers being reserved for the runner-up. The horse's owner received a first prize of £720 which included a cup valued at £150.

Morse Code had the Gold Cup as his main objective in the following year and was expected to follow up in the 1939 Gold Cup against what appeared to be a significantly weaker field than 1938. He had performed well in a workout at Kempton Park Racecourse a week before the race and on 9 March, with Danny Morgan again in the saddle, he started at odds of 4/7 against only four opponents. Bel et Bon was second favourite on 11/4 with Brendan's Cottage on 8/1 and the other two runners, L'Estaque and Embarrassed starting at long odds. As in the previous year, the race was run at a slow pace with the runners closely grouped until Morse Code and Brendan's Cottage broke away from their opponents on the second circuit. The favourite led until the last fence but was being hard ridden by Morgan whilst Brendan's Cottage was traveling easily. Morse Code was overtaken on the run-in and was beaten five lengths into second place.

== Assessment and honours ==
In their book, A Century of Champions, based on the Timeform rating system, John Randall and Tony Morris rated Morse Code an "inferior" Gold Cup winner.

== Pedigree ==
Pedigree of Morse Code (GB), chestnut gelding, 1929
Sire The Pilot (GB) 1921	Tracery (USA); 1909	Rock Sand	Sainfoin
Sire The Pilot (GB) 1921	Tracery (USA); 1909	Rock Sand	Roquebrune
Sire The Pilot (GB) 1921	Tracery (USA); 1909	Topiary	Orme
Sire The Pilot (GB) 1921	Tracery (USA); 1909	Topiary	Plaisanterie
Sire The Pilot (GB) 1921	Homeward Bound (GB); 1912	Isinglass	Isonomy
Sire The Pilot (GB) 1921	Homeward Bound (GB); 1912	Isinglass	Dead Lock
Sire The Pilot (GB) 1921	Homeward Bound (GB); 1912	Will Return	William the Third
Sire The Pilot (GB) 1921	Homeward Bound (GB); 1912	Will Return	Recall
Dam Heliograph (GB) 1914	Heliotrope (GB); 1903	St Frusquin	St Simon
Dam Heliograph (GB) 1914	Heliotrope (GB); 1903	St Frusquin	Isabel
Dam Heliograph (GB) 1914	Heliotrope (GB); 1903	Cereza	Petrarch
Dam Heliograph (GB) 1914	Heliotrope (GB); 1903	Cereza	Cherry
Dam Heliograph (GB) 1914	Revolving Light (GB); 1906	Red Prince	Kendal
Dam Heliograph (GB) 1914	Revolving Light (GB); 1906	Red Prince	Empress
Dam Heliograph (GB) 1914	Revolving Light (GB); 1906	Revolver	Hawkeye
Dam Heliograph (GB) 1914	Revolving Light (GB); 1906	Revolver	Repetition (Family: 2-h)
