= 1939 Grand National =

English steeplechase horse race

- Grand National
- Location: Aintree Racecourse
- Date: March 1939
- Winning horse: (Republic of Ireland) Workman
- Starting price: 100/8
- Jockey: (Republic of Ireland) Tim Hyde
- Trainer: (Republic of Ireland) Jack Ruttle
- Owner: (England) Alexander Maguire
- Conditions: Good

External videos
- Highlights of the 1939 Grand National (British Pathé)

The 1939 Grand National was the 98th renewal of the Grand National horse race that took place at Aintree near Liverpool, England, on 24 March 1939.

The winning jockey was Irishman Tim Hyde, riding 100/8 shot Workman. Workman was trained by Jack Ruttle, for owner Sir Alexander Maguire. MacMoffat finished in second place, Kilstar was third, and Cooleen fourth for the second consecutive year.

Thirty-seven horses ran, competing for the £10,000 in prize money, and all returned safely to the stables.

== Finishing order ==
Position	Name	Jockey	Age	Handicap (st-lb)	SP	Distance
01	Workman	Tim Hyde	9	10-06	100/8	3 Lengths
02	MacMoffatt	Ian Alder			25/1	
03	Kilstar	George Archibald			8/1	
04	Cooleen	Jack Fawcus			22/1	
05	Symaethis	Matthew Feakes			66/1	
06	Dominick's Cross	Bob Everett			33/1	
07	West Point	Jimmy Brogan			66/1	
08	Pencraik	A Scratchley			100/1	
09	Royal Mail	Danny Morgan			100/8	
10	Bachelor Prince	Tom Isaac			66/1	
11	Under Bid	Gerry Wilson			22/1	

== Non-finishers ==
Position/Fate	Name	Jockey	Age	Handicap (st-lb)	SP
Fell (1st)	Brendan's Cottage	George Owen			25/1
Fell (1st)	Teme Willow	Fred Rimell			100/9
Fell (1st)	Drim	Mr J Morris			100/1
Fell (1st)	War Vessel	Billy Parvin			50/1
Fell (1st)	Mesmerist	Perry Harding			100/1
Fell (3rd)	Dunhill Castle	Fulke Walwyn			28/1
Fell (7th)	Royal Danieli	Dan Moore			100/8
Fell (6th)	Epiphanes	Herbert Applin			100/1
Fell (9th)	Rockquilla	Thomas F Carey			100/6
Fell (9th)	Luckypenny	Roger Moseley			100/1
	Perfect Part	James Ward			33/1
	Red Freeman	Bill Redmond			50/1
	Sporting Piper	John Hislop			50/1
	Blue Shirt	Bob Smyth			10/1
	Second Act	Jack Dowdeswell			100/1
Refused (5th)	St George II	Robert Petre			33/1
	Tuckmill	Glen Kelly			100/1
	Birthgift	Thomas McNeill			100/1
	Red Hillman	Eric Foley			66/1
	Montrejeau II	Frenchie Nicholson			40/1
	Deslys	Alexander Marsh			100/1
	Scotch Wood	Peter Herbert			100/1
	Milano	Mr L Stoddard			50/1
	Lucky Patch	Tommy Elder			66/1
	Black Hawk	John Moloney			40/1
	Inversible	Matt Hogan			22/1
