= 1849 in sports =

1849 in sports describes the year's events in world sport.

== Boxing ==
Events

- 7 February — following years of inactivity, American champion Tom Hyer finally returns to the ring and fights Yankee Sullivan at Stillpond Creek in Maryland. Hyer wins in the 16th round. The fight should have taken place at Rock Point, Maryland, on 10 January but the police forced its cancellation.
- William Thompson retains the Championships of England but there is no record of any fights involving him in 1849.

== Cricket ==
Events

- 23, 24 & 25 July — a match between Sheffield and Manchester at Hyde Park Ground, Sheffield is styled "Yorkshire v Lancashire" and is therefore both the first match to involve a Lancashire county team and the inaugural Roses Match. Yorkshire win by 5 wickets.

England

- Most runs – George Parr 529 @ 31.11 (HS 86*)
- Most wickets – William Hillyer 141 @ 13.20 (BB 8–?)

== Horse racing ==
England

- Grand National – Peter Simple
- 1,000 Guineas Stakes – The Flea
- 2,000 Guineas Stakes – Nunnykirk
- The Derby – The Flying Dutchman
- The Oaks – Lady Evelyn
- St. Leger Stakes – The Flying Dutchman

== Football ==
- The rules for the Eton wall game are written down for the first time.

== Rowing ==
The Boat Race

- 29 March — the Oxford and Cambridge Boat Race, last contested in 1846, is revived and this 9th race is won by Cambridge
- 15 December — Oxford is awarded the 10th Oxford and Cambridge Boat Race following the disqualification of Cambridge. This is the first and last time that the race is contested twice in the same year.
