= Red Rower =

British-bred Thoroughbred racehorse

- Sire: Rameses the Second
- Grandsire: Gainsborough
- Dam: Red Maru
- Damsire: Kosciusko
- Sex: Gelding
- Foaled: 1934
- Country: United Kingdom
- Colour: Bay
- Breeder: Hugh Grosvenor, 2nd Baron Stalbridge
- Owner: Lord Stalbridge
- Trainer: Ivor Anthony; Lord Stalbridge

Major wins
- Lilley Brook Chase (1940); Grand Annual Chase (1942); Cheltenham Gold Cup (1945)

Red Rower (foaled 1934) was a British Thoroughbred racehorse who won the 1945 Cheltenham Gold Cup. He raced during the Second World War when opportunities for National Hunt horses were severely limited. After winning the Lilley Brook Chase in 1940 he finished third to stable companion Poet Prince in his first attempt at the Gold Cup in the following year. In 1942 he won the Grand Annual Chase and started favourite for the Gold Cup but was beaten into second place by Medoc II. On the resumption of National Hunt racing after a two-year break he finally won the Gold Cup at the age of eleven in 1945.

== Background ==
Red Rower was a bay gelding bred and owned by Hugh Grosvenor, 2nd Baron Stalbridge. He was sired by Rameses the Second, a son of the wartime Triple Crown winner Gainsborough. Red Rower's dam Red Maru also produced Red April who won the County Hurdle and finished third in both the Champion Hurdle and the Cheltenham Gold Cup. She was a granddaughter of Fair Wind, a broodmare whose other descendants included Dark Japan (Goodwood Cup) and West Indies (Irish 1000 Guineas). This made Red Rower one of the few high-class racehorses to emerge from Thoroughbred family 52. Red Rower was initially sent into training with Ivor Anthony at Wroughton in Wiltshire.

== Racing career ==
Red Rower showed early promise as a steeplechaser, winning three races over two miles before stepping up to three miles and winning the Lilley Brook Chase as a six-year-old at Cheltenham in April 1940. The gelding made his first appearance in the Cheltenham Gold Cup as a seven-year-old in 1941 in which he was ridden by Danny Morgan and started at odds of 8/1. He led the field approaching the final fence where he was overtaken by his stablemate Poet Prince and lost second place by a short head to Savon in the final strides.

Wartime restrictions meant that major sporting events were confined to the weekend and the 1942 Cheltenham Festival was run over successive Saturdays rather than consecutive days. On 14 March, Red Rower contested the Grand Annual Chase a race which attracted many of the leading contenders for the Gold Cup a week later. He took the lead at the final fence and won by a head from Medoc II with Broken Promise a length away in third. Medoc's more highly regarded stablemate Savon (runner-up in the 1941 Gold Cup) fell in the race and sustained a fatal injury. In the Gold Cup Red Rower started 3/1 favourite and was in the leading group until the last ditch fence when he was badly hampered by the fall of the leader Solarium. He came away from the fence well adrift of the new leader Medoc, and although he steadily reduced the margin he was beaten eight lengths into second place. In the following September National Hunt racing was suspended in Britain and the next two Cheltenham festivals did not take place.

National Hunt racing resumed at the end of 1944 although several leading jumpers including Medoc and Prince Regent were unable to compete owing to a decision of the National Hunt Committee not to accept entries on behalf of horses which had left the country after 1 June 1941. Red Rower, now officially trained by Lord Stalbridge, won at Windsor Racecourse in February 1945 before contesting the Cheltenham Gold Cup on 17 March in a record field of sixteen runners. The field included five horses who had never won over fences and five others who were aged thirteen or over. Red Rower, ridden the former flat race jockey Davy Jones started the 11-4 favourite ahead of Paladin on 100/30 and Schubert on 11-2 whilst the other runners included the thirteen-year-old Poet Prince. Red Rower tracked the front-runners before going up to dispute the lead with Paladin and Schubert at the last fence and drew away on the run-in to win by three lengths.

Red Rower's last major race was the 1946 Grand National the first edition of the race for six years. Now a twelve-year-old he carried the third highest weight of 161 pounds and was pulled up in a race won by Lovely Cottage.

== Assessment and honours ==
In their book, A Century of Champions, based on the Timeform rating system, John Randall and Tony Morris rated Red Rower a "poor" Gold Cup winner. Red Rower is remembered in the name of Red Rower Close, a residential street in Cheltenham.

== Pedigree ==
Pedigree of Red Rower (GB), bay gelding, 1934
Sire Rameses the Second (GB) 1927	Gainsborough (GB); 1915	Bayardo	Bay Ronald
Sire Rameses the Second (GB) 1927	Gainsborough (GB); 1915	Bayardo	Galicia
Sire Rameses the Second (GB) 1927	Gainsborough (GB); 1915	Rosedrop	St Frusquin*
Sire Rameses the Second (GB) 1927	Gainsborough (GB); 1915	Rosedrop	Rosaline
Sire Rameses the Second (GB) 1927	Grand Rapide (GB); 1921	Hurry On	Marcovil
Sire Rameses the Second (GB) 1927	Grand Rapide (GB); 1921	Hurry On	Toute Suite
Sire Rameses the Second (GB) 1927	Grand Rapide (GB); 1921	Mademoiselle Pictet	Picton
Sire Rameses the Second (GB) 1927	Grand Rapide (GB); 1921	Mademoiselle Pictet	Morette
Dam Red Maru (GB) 1927	Kosciusko; 1909	Melton	Master Kildare
Dam Red Maru (GB) 1927	Kosciusko; 1909	Melton	Violet Melrose
Dam Red Maru (GB) 1927	Kosciusko; 1909	Simena	St Simon*
Dam Red Maru (GB) 1927	Kosciusko; 1909	Simena	Flying Footsep
Dam Red Maru (GB) 1927	Red Light (GB); 1917	Minter	Minting
Dam Red Maru (GB) 1927	Red Light (GB); 1917	Minter	Dissipation
Dam Red Maru (GB) 1927	Red Light (GB); 1917	Fair Wind	Succoth
Dam Red Maru (GB) 1927	Red Light (GB); 1917	Fair Wind	Windward (Family: 52)

* Red Rower is inbred 5S x 4D to the stallion St Simon, meaning that he appears fifth generation (via St Frusquin) on the sire side of his pedigree, and fourth generation on the dam side of his pedigree.
