= 1946 Grand National =

Horse race held in 1946

- Grand National
- Location: Aintree Racecourse
- Date: 5 April 1946
- Winning horse: Lovely Cottage
- Starting price: 25/1
- Jockey: (England) Capt. Robert Petre
- Trainer: Tommy Rayson
- Owner: John Morant
- Conditions: Good

External videos
- Highlights of the 1946 Grand National (British Pathé)

The 1946 Grand National was the 100th renewal of the Grand National horse race that took place at Aintree near Liverpool, England, on 5 April 1946. It was the first true Aintree Grand National since 1940 due to World War II.

The National was won by 25/1 shot Lovely Cottage, ridden by jockey Captain Robert Petre and trained by Tommy Rayson.

Thirty-four horses ran and one died: Symbole fell at Becher's Brook, incurring a fatal cervical fracture.

== Finishing order ==
Position	Name	Jockey	Age	Handicap (st-lb)	SP	Distance
01	Lovely Cottage	Bobby Petre	9	10-8	25/1	4 lengths
02	Jack Finlay	William Kidney	7	10-2	100/1	3 Lengths
03	Prince Regent	Tim Hyde	11	12-5	3/1	
04	Housewarmer	Aubrey Brabazon	9	10-2	100/1	
05	Schubert	Cliff Beechener	12	11-0	100/7	
06	Limestone Edward	David Doyle	12	10-2	13/2	Last to complete

== Non-finishers ==
Fence	Name	Jockey	Age	Handicap (st-lb)	SP	Fate
06	Symbole	Bill Redmond	11	11-0	33/1	Fell
22	Largo	Jack Cooke	7	10-13	66/1	Fell
?	Heirdom	Peter Cahalin	14	10-10	66/1	Fell
15	Bogskar	R Matthews	13	10-9	66/1	Unseated Rider
22	Kami	H Bonneau	9	10-9	33/1	Fell
23	MacMoffat	Ian Alder	14	10/8	50/1	Unseated rider
12	Astrometer	M Gordon	8	10-3	50/1	Fell
19	Knight's Crest	P Murphy	9	10-3	22/1	Fell
29	Suzerain II	George Archibald (jnr)	8	10-3	33/1	Fell
?	Vain Knight	Dick Curran	13	10/2	100/1	Fell
19	Silver Fame	Daniel Ruttle	7	10-0	40/1	Fell
?	Historical Revue	S Ryan	8	10-0	66/1	Fell
?	Tulyra	Derek Jackson	10	10-0	100/1	Fell
03	Dunshaughlin	Bobby O'Ryan	8	10-0	100/8	Fell
?	Double Flush	Eddie Newman	10	10-0	100/1	Fell
?	Yung-Yat	T Cullen jnr	10	10-0	100/1	Fell
19	Lough Conn	Daniel McCann	10	10-0	33/1	Fell
03	Jock	Fred Gurney	8	10-2	50/1	Fell
?	Musical Lad	M Browne	9	10-0	100/1	Fell
?	Bricett	Jimmy Brogan	9	10-2	28/1	Fell
?	Gyppo	Mr J Cousins	12	10-0	40/1	Fell
06	Alacrity	George Bowden	13	10-0	100/1	Unseated Rider
03	Closure	Herbert Applin	9	10-0	100/1	Fell
01	Elsich	Bill Balfe	10	10-0	100/1	Fell
?	Red Rower	Glen Kelly	12	11-7	22/1	Pulled Up
?	EP	Martin Molony	11	10-2	50/1	Pulled Up
?	Newark Hill	Peter Lay	12	10-1	50/1	Brought Down
19	King Gesson	Roger Burford	10	10-0	100/1	Refused
