= Poet Prince =

British-bred Thoroughbred racehorse

- Sire: Milton
- Grandsire: Marcovil
- Dam: Welsh Princess
- Damsire: Hapsburg
- Sex: Gelding
- Foaled: 1932
- Country: United Kingdom
- Colour: Chestnut
- Owner: David Sherbrooke
- Trainer: Ivor Anthony; Fulke Walwyn

Major wins
- Stanley Chase (1940); Cheltenham Gold Cup (1941)

Poet Prince (foaled 1932) was a British Thoroughbred racehorse who won the 1941 Cheltenham Gold Cup. He had earlier won the Stanley Chase at Aintree and went on to contest two more Gold Cups. He was unplaced when well-fancied in 1942 and finished fourth in 1945 at the age of thirteen.

== Background ==
Poet Prince was a chestnut gelding with a broad white blaze bred in the United Kingdom. He was sired by Milton, a representative of the Godolphin Arabian sireline whose wins included the Criterion Stakes in 1918 and the Ribblesdale Stakes in the following year. His dam, Welsh Princess was a great-granddaughter of Wedding Eve, an Irish broodmare whose other descendants have included the Kentucky Derby winner Ponder.

As a young horse Poet Prince had breathing problems and was not regarded as a serious racing prospect. He was acquired for only 40 guineas by David Sherbrooke, a veterinary surgeon who also competed as an amateur jockey. He was initially sent into training with Ivor Anthony at Wroughton in Wiltshire.

== Racing career ==
Poet Prince showed good form in the early part of his racing career and won the Stanley Chase at Aintree Racecourse in the spring of 1940. Despite his success at the course, he never contested the Grand National.

On 20 March 1941, Poet Prince was one of ten horses to contest the sixteenth running of the Cheltenham Gold Cup. David Sherbrooke had intended to ride the horse himself but was injured in a fall on the previous day and the ride went to Roger Burford. The 1940 winner Roman Hackle favourite ahead of Savon with Poet Prince third choice in the betting at odds of 7/2 whilst the other fancied runners included Red Rower (also trained by Ivor Anthony) and The Professor. In the race Poet Prince tracked Red Rower before taking the lead at the final obstacle. He drew away on the run-in and won by three lengths from Savon, with Red Rower a short head away in third place.

Poet Prince ran well in hurdle races in the early part of the next season. On 21 March 1942 he made an attempt to win a second Gold Cup when he faced stronger opposition in a race run in thick fog. Ridden again by Burford he finished unplaced behind the French-bred Medoc II. National Hunt racing in Britain was suspended in September 1942. The first Cheltenham Festival for three years was held in 1945 and Poet Prince, now trained by Fulke Walwyn, returned to contest his third Gold Cup at the age of thirteen. He traveled very well for most of the way and looked the likely winner two fences out but then began to struggle and dropped back to finish fourth behind Red Rower.

== Assessment and honours ==
In their book, A Century of Champions, based on the Timeform rating system, John Randall and Tony Morris rated Poet Prince a "poor" Gold Cup winner.

== Pedigree ==
Pedigree of Poet Prince (GB), chestnut gelding, 1932
Sire Milton (GB) 1916	Marcovil (GB); 1903	Marco	Barcaldine
Sire Milton (GB) 1916	Marcovil (GB); 1903	Marco	Novitiate
Sire Milton (GB) 1916	Marcovil (GB); 1903	Lady Villikins	Hagioscope
Sire Milton (GB) 1916	Marcovil (GB); 1903	Lady Villikins	Dinah
Sire Milton (GB) 1916	Misfit (GB); 1909	Collar	St Simon*
Sire Milton (GB) 1916	Misfit (GB); 1909	Collar	Ornament
Sire Milton (GB) 1916	Misfit (GB); 1909	Miss Lettice	Amphion*
Sire Milton (GB) 1916	Misfit (GB); 1909	Miss Lettice	Vetch
Dam Welsh Princess (GB) 1924	Hapsburg (GB); 1911	Desmond	St Simon*
Dam Welsh Princess (GB) 1924	Hapsburg (GB); 1911	Desmond	L'Abbesse de Jouarre
Dam Welsh Princess (GB) 1924	Hapsburg (GB); 1911	Altesse	Amphion*
Dam Welsh Princess (GB) 1924	Hapsburg (GB); 1911	Altesse	Marchioness
Dam Welsh Princess (GB) 1924	Welsh Bride (GB); 1912	Picton	Orvieto
Dam Welsh Princess (GB) 1924	Welsh Bride (GB); 1912	Picton	Hecuba
Dam Welsh Princess (GB) 1924	Welsh Bride (GB); 1912	Irish Bride	St Gris
Dam Welsh Princess (GB) 1924	Welsh Bride (GB); 1912	Irish Bride	Wedding Eve (Family: 23)

* Poet Prince is inbred 4S × 4D to the stallion St Simon, meaning that he appears fourth generation on the sire side of his pedigree and fourth generation on the dam side of his pedigree.

* Poet Prince is inbred 4S × 4D to the stallion Amphion, meaning that he appears fourth generation on the sire side of his pedigree and fourth generation on the dam side of his pedigree.
