= Medoc II =

French-bred Thoroughbred racehorse

- Sire: Van
- Grandsire: Alcantara
- Dam: Menthe Poivree
- Damsire: Pot au Feu
- Sex: Gelding
- Foaled: 1934
- Country: France
- Colour: Bay
- Owner: Hugh Molyneux, 7th Earl of Sefton
- Trainer: Reg Hobbs

Major wins
- National Hunt Juvenile Stakes (1938); Seven Springs Handicap Chase (1940, 1941); Cheltenham Gold Cup (1942)

Medoc II (also known simply as Medoc, foaled 1934) was a French-bred, British-trained Thoroughbred racehorse who won the 1942 Cheltenham Gold Cup. He won races at the Cheltenham Festival in 1938, 1940 and 1941 before defeating a strong field in the Gold Cup but his later career was severely limited by wartime restrictions.

== Background ==
Medoc was a bay gelding bred in France. He was sired by the French stallion Van, a high class flat racer who finished second in the Prix Dollar. Medoc's dam Menthe Poivree also produced Roi d'Egypte (sired by Van) whose wins included the Cathcart Challenge Cup at Cheltenham in 1942. She was a great-granddaughter of Sand Blast, whose other descendants have included Madam Gay.

Medoc was bought by Hugh Molyneux, 7th Earl of Sefton and sent into training with Reg Hobbs at his Rhonehurst Stable in Upper Lambourn. Hobbs came to widespread public attention when he trained the American stallion Battleship to win the 1938 Grand National, ridden by his son Bruce.

== Racing career ==
Medoc showed promising early form as a steeplechaser winning the National Hunt Juvenile Chase as a four-year-old in 1938. He won the Seven Springs Handicap Chase in the 1940 Cheltenham Festival. He won at Plumpton Racecourse in March 1941 and went on to win the Seven Springs Handicap Chase for a second time. In November 1941 he finished second to Mixed Foursome in a chase at Cheltenham.

Wartime restrictions meant that major sporting events were confined to the weekend and the 1942 Cheltenham Festival was run over successive Saturdays rather than consecutive days. On 14 March, Medoc contested the Grand Annual Chase and finished second by a head to Red Rower with Broken Promise a length back in third. Medoc's more highly regarded stablemate Savon (runner-up in the 1941 Gold Cup) fell in the race and sustained a fatal injury.

The 1942 Gold Cup was run in front of a sparse crown in cold foggy conditions although any mention of the weather was omitted in the BBC Radio commentary in case the reports gave information to the enemy. Despite the conditions, the twelve-runner field was a strong one, containing as it did the previous winners Roman Hackle and Poet Prince. Red Rower was made the 3/1 favourite, with Medoc, ridden by Frenchie Nicholson, second choice in the betting on 9/2. Medoc was in fourth place when the complexion of the race changed completely at the final ditch: the leader Solarium fell, bringing down Broken Promise and severely hampering Red Rower. Left with a clear lead, Medoc stayed on well to win by eight lengths from Red Rower, who was in turn four lengths clear of Schubert.

National Hunt racing was suspended in September 1942 and Medoc was sent to race Ireland. When jump racing resumed in Britain at the end of 1944 Medoc was unable to resume his racing career owing to a decision of the National Hunt Committee not to accept entries on behalf of horses which had left the country after 1 June 1941.

== Assessment and honours ==
In their book, A Century of Champions, based on the Timeform rating system, John Randall and Tony Morris rated Medoc a "poor" Gold Cup winner. Medoc is remembered in the name of Medoc Close, a residential street in Cheltenham.

== Pedigree ==
Pedigree of Medoc (FR), bay gelding, 1934
Sire Van (FR) 1917	Alcantara (FR); 1908	Perth	War Dance
Sire Van (FR) 1917	Alcantara (FR); 1908	Perth	Primrose Dame
Sire Van (FR) 1917	Alcantara (FR); 1908	Toison d'Or	Le Sancy
Sire Van (FR) 1917	Alcantara (FR); 1908	Toison d'Or	Harfleur
Sire Van (FR) 1917	Annarella (FR); 1910	Doricles	Florizel II
Sire Van (FR) 1917	Annarella (FR); 1910	Doricles	Rosalie
Sire Van (FR) 1917	Annarella (FR); 1910	Saint Astra	Ladas
Sire Van (FR) 1917	Annarella (FR); 1910	Saint Astra	Saint Celestra
Dam Menthe Poivree (FR) 1927	Pot au Feu (FR); 1921	Bruleur	Choubesrki
Dam Menthe Poivree (FR) 1927	Pot au Feu (FR); 1921	Bruleur	Basse Terre
Dam Menthe Poivree (FR) 1927	Pot au Feu (FR); 1921	Polly Peachum	Spearmint
Dam Menthe Poivree (FR) 1927	Pot au Feu (FR); 1921	Polly Peachum	Lindoiya*
Dam Menthe Poivree (FR) 1927	Minieh (GB); 1914	Minoru	Cyllene
Dam Menthe Poivree (FR) 1927	Minieh (GB); 1914	Minoru	Mother Siegel
Dam Menthe Poivree (FR) 1927	Minieh (GB); 1914	Red Sea	Gallinule*
Dam Menthe Poivree (FR) 1927	Minieh (GB); 1914	Red Sea	Sand Blast (Family: 7-a)

* Medoc II is inbred 5D x 4D to the stallion Gallinule, meaning that he appears fifth generation (via Lindoiya) and fourth generation on the dam side of his pedigree.
