= 1849 Grand National =

English steeplechase horse race

- Grand National
- Location: Aintree
- Date: 28 February 1849
- Winning horse: Peter Simple
- Starting price: 20/1
- Jockey: Tom Cunningham
- Trainer: Tom Cunningham
- Owner: Finch Mason, Jr.
- Conditions: Heavy (soft in places)

The 1849 Grand National Steeplechase was the 11th official annual running of a handicap steeplechase horse race at Aintree Racecourse near Liverpool on Wednesday, 28 February. It attracted a field of twenty-four competitors for a prize valued at £825.

The race was won by Tom Cunningham on Finch Mason's Peter Simple, having also trained the horse himself. Cunningham wore Finch Mason's colours of green silks with salmon sleeves and pink cap. The horse won in a time of 10 minutes 56 seconds, seventeen seconds slower than the course record set two years earlier. For the second consecutive year there were three equine fatalities during the race, taking the number of fatalities in the history of the race to eight and leading to heavy criticism in the press. The owner was not the same Finch Mason who achieved fame painting racing scenes in the latter half of the 19th century.

== Leading contenders ==
Prince George was sent off as the 5/1 favourite as the mount of Tom Olliver who was also the most experienced rider in the race, being the only man to have taken part in every official National. However, his participation had been in doubt until the night prior to the race after suffering a heavy fall the previous day at Cheltenham The duel winning rider was one of several to benefit from a false start, which was not recalled, the roars of encouragement from nearby spectators drowning out the calls of starter, Lord Sefton to recall the runners. The favourite remained prominent until the runners approached the racecourse for the final time where Olliver realised he had nothing left to offer, being nursed home a distant third to finish.

The Curate had been a long time pre race favourite in the betting rooms of Manchester where most pre race wagers were struck, having been beaten by just half a length in the previous year's race. With Tom Olliver's defection to the favourite it was Horatio Powell who took the ride in what proved to be his last of eleven rides in the race, including one regarded as unofficial, being sent off at 7/1. Powell had moved the horse into second place behind the runaway leader when stumbling over the third fence after the sunken lane on the second circuit and suffering a fatal fall. the vet having to be summoned to end the horse's pain when he was found to be badly injured.

The Knight of Gwynne found popularity on the day of the race from those spectators with military affiliations as the horse was to be ridden by his owner, Captain Thomas D'Arcy, who was one of seven riders making his debut in the race. The Captain himself is believed to have placed sizable bets on his mount winning, being sent off at 8/1. It's unclear whether the horse managed to get away among those in the false start but at the start of the second circuit he had moved through the field to take position behind the eventual winner. A legend grew, and has been repeated in several later publications, that D'Arcy began shouting inducements to Cunningham as they raced up the final straight. However, given the noise in the stands, and the distance between the first, second and third riders in the closing stages, and the fact such a noteworthy story went completely unreported by the contemporary press, the story is more likely an urban legend born out of gossip generated after D'Arcy was disgraced and found guilty of betting fraud in 1851. His death in 1852 preventing any opportunity for him to ever debunk the tale.

Proceed was another mount of an owner and military Captain, William Peel who was taking his fifth ride in the race and had been thought to have had a share in the ownership of the previous year's winner of the race. Like D'Arcy, Peel gained great support from those in military circles and was also sent off at 8/1. Optimism was increased due to modifications made to the Sunken Lane where Peel and his mount had refused when previously racing at Aintree the previous Autumn. They were among those who were part of the false start and were well placed behind the leader at the Sunken Lane where Proceed repeated his action of a few months earlier and again refused. After several attempts to spur his mount, Peel had no choice but to turn around and return to the nearby stables.

Wolverhampton was owned by the 1840 winner rider, Bartholomew Bretherton who took the ride himself, making it his seventh, when unofficial pre 1839 Nationals are included. Bretherton was a local man from a well known family and as such found popular support on the course for his mount, who was sent off at 12/1 but was never involved at the business end of the race and was caught up in the melee at the second fence after the Sunken Lane. Bretherton never again took part in a National, though he remained a regular visitor to Aintree over the next quarter of a century.

The British Yeoman returned after finishing third in the previous year's race and was again partnered by Charles Bevill, taking his third and final ride in the National. The former flat racer, who had once been well fancied in the Epsom Derby was sent off at 12/1 and was still in contention as the runners entered the race course for the final time. However, he was quickly outpaced and Bevill pulled up at the final hurdle when beaten.

Alfred was the mount of 1847 winner Denny Wynne, who was having his fourth ride in the race and had already become the popular rider among Irish visitors to Aintree. Wynne had his mount well placed throughout but was unable to throw down a challenge in the last half mile and walked in a distant fourth.

Peter Simple was among the each way chances at 20/1 and won the race without ever being headed, going to the front at the head of those who broke with a false start.

== The Course ==
While the course was almost as it is today the fences to be jumped were mostly the natural hedges banks and ditches that they encountered along the route rather than the man made obstacles of the modern era. The land away from the main section of the racecourse, known today as the country during the National was indeed open countryside and was being farmed, resulting in the fields the horses ran across being either ploughed or grazing land, only the racecourse itself was laid to turf or contained man made obstacles.

Riders instructions when racing in the country were simply to stay outside a set of flags which had been placed on the inner ring of the course and while these aimed to direct the riders towards the jumps, such as Becher's Brook, Canal Turn and Valentine's Brook they did not necessarily have to jump the fences and could instead take a wider path along country lanes if they felt the route worthwhile, however by 1849 it was rare for any rider to gain an advantage by taking a route, which bypassed a fence.

As a result of the make up of the course and fences the Grand National of 1849 would have more resembled a fox hunt than a steeplechase to a modern observer while press reporters relayed the action in their newspapers as the runners crossing from field to field rather than from fence to fence.

A map of the course from 1848 shows that the start was at a location which today sits halfway between Melling Road and the first fence. Becher's Brook was the fifth fence the runners jumped before making taking two obstacles at the farthest end of the course, the second of which was a double hedge with rails and a small ditch. The ninety degree turn at the Canal, not yet formally named the Canal Turn was the eighth flight and was followed by Brook at the Canal side as fence nine. Three further fences were jumped alongside the Canal before the runners re-entered the racecourse from the countryside beyond, today known as Anchor Bridge crossing. Thus the runners had jumped twelve obstacles on the first circuit before turning towards the stands where they jumped the monument fence, today known as the chair, followed by the water jump, both of these fences had to be jumped.

The runners then crossed the lane again, jumping into and out of a sunken lane, which in previous years had caused several competitors to refuse, including almost half the field in 1848, despite the hedge into the lane having been almost removed the previous year. Further alterations were made this year as the lane was greatly filled in, the remaining hedge in front of it removed, and the formidable hedge out of it cut to half its previous size with two gaps placed in it. The lane would gradually be levelled to the course completely over the next few years.

The line of country run towards Becher's for the second time was slightly different from the first as the runners jumped the first fence of the second circuit some fifty metres away from where they would have met it first time around. As they continued towards Becher's they would meet each fence, which were little more than eighteen inch high earth banks, at a closer point to where they jumped on the first circuit until the two paths of the first and second circuits finally met at Becher's itself, this time being the twenty-first fence. The runners then followed the same path as first time round with the Canal Turn being fence twenty-four and Valentine's Brook being fence twenty-five. After crossing the lane back on to the race course, the runners once again deviated from the first circuit, this time having to continue out to the widest extreme so that the spectators in the many grandstands got a good view of the final half mile of the race along home straight.

Two hurdles were placed along the straight, being the thirty-first and thirty second obstacles. The winning post was about thirty metres beyond its present location at the very end of the straight.

== The Race ==
After criticism that last year's race had been allowed to go after a false start, starter, Lord Sefton, fearing a repeat, called the runners back from the start point to calm the jockeys down. A small number of riders ignored his instruction and when he lowered the flag, they got a clear false start. Sefton tried to recall the runners but only a small number heeded his instruction and when those left at the start set off in pursuit of the false starters, any hope of a recall was lost. Despite Sefton declaring a false start, there was never any question of the race being stopped or declared void, and with little official organisation, none of the connections of the competitors are recorded as having lodged any form of objection. Peter Simple was among those who benefitted most from the flying start and, having obtained the early lead, controlled the race throughout and was never headed.

Despite the chaotic start leaving many tail enders forced to set off at a sprinting pace, the first few fences, described as little more than 18 inch high banks, were negotiated without incident. At the fourth flight Kilfane was the first to exit the race, suffering a broken leg when Sparta crashed into him and was brought down.

Peter Simple opened up an increasingly long lead over Becher's Brook, Canal Turn and back over the Brook on the Canal side with Napoleon having made the greatest effort to close the gap before tiring rapidly on reaching the racecourse for the first time. Cunningham gave Peter Simple a breather on the racecourse, allowing his lead to be reduced to a mere few lengths by the time he cleared the Chair in front of the stands. Equinox, Chatham, Mulligan, Ballybar, Chandler, Proceed, Knight of Gwynne and Alfred completed the front rank with The Iron Duke missing, having been pulled up at the Canal side before entering the course.

In spite of the modifications to the Sunken Lane, it continued to cause problems as second placed Proceed refused while Jerry needed to be put to the fence a second time before continuing, only to be brought down in a pile up two fences later when second placed Equinox was killed in a fall, which led to Ballybar, Chatham, Corriander and Wolverhampton all to exit the race. The Curate was now left in second place only to also suffer a fatal fall at the next fence while the early challenger, Napoleon pulled up when tailed off at this point.

Peter Simple continued to run at a virtual canter in the lead as each of his challengers came to grief behind him. By the time he came back towards the race course it was Mulligan who looked like having the best chance of laying down a challenge with Prince George, The Knight of Gwynne, Alfred, The British Yeoman and Chandler the only competitors still in the contest.

By this stage Khondooz had pulled up at Becher's second time, while The Victim and Arab Robber both fell at the final fence before re-entering the racecourse.

By the final hurdle the race was considered over as a contest as Peter Simple had already been reduced to a mere canter, sufficient to maintain a lead to the winning post. The Knight of Gwynne was allowed to close to within three lengths of the winner but was never in any serious danger of overhauling him. Prince George was a distant third while the remaining runners walked in and were not considered official finishers by the distance judge.

== Finishing order ==
Officially only the first three placed horses were recorded, with all the other competitors merely being officially listed as having taken part. However, contemporary newspaper reports for the 1849 race were unusually consistent with each other in regard to the fate of the other competitors. The return below is taken from those reports held in the British Newspaper Archive. In any instances where reports were in conflict, the verdict of a majority of reporters from independent reports has been taken.

position	name	rider	age	weight	starting price	distance or fate	Colours
Winner	Peter Simple	Tom Cunningham	11	11-06 [inc 6lbs extra]	20/1	10 min 56 sec	Green, pink sleeves, yellow cap
Second	The Knight of Gwynne {Formerly The Fortune Teller}	Captain Thomas D'Arcy		10-07	8/1	Three lengths	White, red cap
Third	Prince George	Tom Olliver		10-10	5/1 favourite*	A distance	Light blue, white cap
Non finishers
Fence 32 [Final Hurdle]	Alfred	Denny Wynne	5	10-06	12/1	Pulled up and walked in. Would have finished fourth if continued	Blue with yellow sleeves and cap
Fence 32 [Final Hurdle]	Chandler	Josey Little		12-02	unquoted	Puled up at final hurdle and walked in.	White with black sleeves and cap
Fence 32 [Final Hurdle]	British Yeoman	Charles Bevill		11-04	12/1	Pulled up and walked in.	Scarlet with black cap
Fence 32 [Final Hurdle]	Mulligan	William Ford	5	11-02	unquoted	Pulled up and walked in.	Blue with yellow sleeves and black cap
Fence 28 [second fence after the Brook on Canal side]	The Victim	William Taylor		10-11	unquoted	Fell	Red with blue sleeves and red cap
Fence 28 [second fence after the Brook on Canal side]	The Arab Robber	W Phillips	6	11-02	25/1	Fell	Black with green sleeves and black cap
Fence 21 [2nd Becher's Brook]	Khondooz	Harry Rackley		9-10	unquoted	Pulled up	Scarlet with white cap
Fence 20	Napoleon	William Archer	6	10-08	50/1	Pulled up	Chocolate with white piping and cap
Fence 18 [Earth Bank]	The Curate	Horatio Powell		11-11	7/1	Fell (destroyed)	Blue with red cap
Fence 17 [Earth Bank]	Wolverhampton	Bartholomew Bretherton		11-05	12/1	Fell	Blue with red cap
Fence 17 [Earth Bank]	Chatham	John Frisby		10-06	20/1	Fell	Black and white stripes with black cap
Fence 17 [Earth Bank]	Equinox	W. Moloney		9-12	unquoted	Fell {destroyed}	Green with black cap
Fence 17 [Earth Bank]	Ballybar	Henry Bradley		9-12	unquoted	Brought down by Equinox	Scarlet with white sleeves and black cap
Fence 17 [Earth Bank]	Coriander	James Daly		10-06	unquoted	Fell	Scarlet
Fence 17 [Earth Bank]	Jerry*	John Shaw Walker		10-04	25/1	Refused the Sunken Lane but went on and later Brought down by Ballybar	Scarlet with white sash and black cap
Between fences 15-21 [Sunken lane to Becher's Brook]	Sir John	V. Sharkey		10-10	unquoted	Left at start and Tailed off throughout, Pulled up	Scarlet with black cap
Between fences 15-21 [Sunken lane to Becher's Brook]	Tipperary Boy	George Darby	5	10-09	unquoted	Left at start and Tailed off throughout, Pulled up	
Fence 15 [Sunken Lane]	Proceed	Captain William Peel		11-11	7/1	Refused	Blue with orange cap
Between Fences 12 and 13 [Anchor Bridge]	The Iron Duke	Tom Abbot	5	11-00	unquoted	Pulled up, waited for the runners on the second circuit and walked in with the unplaced horses	
Fence 4 [Earth Bank]	Kilfane	J Neale		11-00	unquoted	Fell {destroyed}	Scarlet with white cap
Fence 4 [Earth Bank]	Sparta	Christopher Wakefield		8-12		Brought Down by Kilfane	White with green cap

Unquoted horses were those offered by bookmakers at any price they felt fair, usually 66 or 100/1. Bookmakers only issued a quoted price for a horse when the odds being asked for by the public suggested that the bookmaker stood to make a loss if said horse were to win. *Jerry is a namesake of the 1840 Grand National winner and not the same horse. * Modern reports quote Prince George as 4/1 favourite. However, this is not supported in any contemporary reports where he is quoted at 5/1.

== Aftermath ==
While the race was now regarded by the press as peerless in Steeplechasing as the biggest race in the UK & Ireland, there was also a great deal of criticism that three horses had been killed for the second consecutive year. The main theory put forward for the high toll was that the small banks the horses were falling over were the same colour as the field beyond, causing both horses and riders to be unsighted. This also diverted attention away from the poor quality of the start for the second consecutive year.

Captain D'Arcy's bribe

Many later history's of the race reported that Captain D'Arcy, the rider of The Knight of Gwynne, attempted to bribe Tom Cunningham, the rider of Peter Simple as they raced up the straight in the final seconds of the race. The story says he offered £1,000 for Cunningham to take a pull, gradually increasing the bribe to £4,000 before the post. However, no contemporary reports in the days or weeks after the race suggested such an event took place, with the first documented record of the event being in a book published in 1907.

No source has ever been provided for the story and in the noise of the final moments of a Grand National it would have been unlikely that any spectators, nor indeed other riders, including Cunningham would have been able to hear D'Arcy shouting. It was already documented by reporters that Lord Sefton's efforts to recall the runners at the start had been drowned out from a position much farther away from the stands than D'Arcy would have been when making the alleged calls to Cunningham. In the closing stages of the race, the eventual winner was also too far clear of his rival for any inducement to have likely been heard as D'Arcy only got to within three lengths of Cunningham in the final strides. In turn the third rider, Tom Olliver was a distance behind D'Arcy, and almost certainly also too far away to be witness to such an event. Had D'Arcy shouted inducements, it would have been unlikely anyone bar he himself would have known it.

There is also no contemporary report of Lord Sefton issuing a ban to D'Arcy, as is suggested by many 20th and 21st century publications and the betting rooms of Manchester list the horse as a 15/1 co favourite for the 1850 race when still in the ownership of D'Arcy in January 1850.

The story may have grown out of events which overtook D'Arcy himself in 1851, when he was accused, tried and found guilty of being complicit in a racing fraud, taking bets for a match race where he intended to swap out the nominated horse for a renowned trotting champion. The match never took place and D'Arcy was sentenced to a year in prison for fraudulently taking bets from the ring. However, he died in 1852 before starting his sentence, his name in Racing blackened.
