= Prince Regent (horse) =

Irish-bred Thoroughbred racehorse

- Sire: My Prince
- Grandsire: Marcovil
- Dam: Nemaea
- Damsire: Argos
- Sex: Gelding
- Foaled: 1935
- Country: Ireland
- Colour: Bay
- Breeder: A H Maxwell
- Owner: Jimmy Rank
- Trainer: Tom Dreaper
- Record: 41: 18-7-5 (steeplechases)

Major wins
- Irish Grand National (1942); Cheltenham Gold Cup (1946); Champion Stakes (1946)

Prince Regent (foaled 1935) was an Irish Thoroughbred racehorse who won the 1946 Cheltenham Gold Cup. He was the dominant steeplechaser in Ireland during World War II with his wins including the Irish Grand National in 1942. After the war he was able to compete in the major British chases and won the Cheltenham Gold Cup in 1946. He finished third when favourite for the 1946 Grand National and fourth in the race in 1947, carrying top weight on both occasions. He continued to race until the age of fourteen, retiring in 1949.

== Background ==
Prince Regent was a large bay gelding, standing 17 hands high in maturity, bred in Ireland by A H Mawell. He was sired by My Prince, a high-class performer on the flat who became a very successful sire of National Hunt horses. His other offspring included the Cheltenham Gold Cup winner Easter Hero and the Grand National winners Reynoldstown, Gregalach and Royal Mail. Prince Regent's dam, Nemaea, was a full-sister to Diomedes, an outstanding sprinter who won the Nunthorpe Stakes, King's Stand Stakes and two July Cups.

As a yearling, Prince Regent was sold at the Goff's sale and returned to the auction ring a year later when he was bought for £407 by Harry Bonner acting on behalf of James Voase "Jimmy" Rank (the older brother of the film producer J. Arthur Rank). The horse was broken in by Tom Dreaper in Ireland, after which it was intended that he would be sent into training with Gwyn Evans at Druid's Lodge in Wiltshire. When Evans died, Prince Regent was sent back to Dreaper, a livestock farmer who trained racehorses at Greenogue in County Dublin. Rank wanted Dreaper to train for him in England but Dreaper refused to relocate.

== Racing career ==
=== Early career in Ireland ===
Prince Regent began his racing career in bumpers, winning at the third attempt as a five-year-old in 1940. He then switched to racing over obstacles and developed into a top class steeplechaser over the next two years. In 1942 he won three chases under big weights and was assigned 175 pounds for the Irish Grand National at Fairyhouse. Ridden by Timmy Hyde, he won from Dorothy Paget's Golden Jack. A whole generation of fine Irish chasers, normally exported, ran against each other often in handicaps for small prize money. Prince Regent won 12 races in Ireland between 1941 and 1945. It has been reported that "it is necessary to appreciate this in order to assimilate that Arkle had to win two Cheltenham Gold Cups before Tom Dreaper conceded that "he might be the Prince's equal""

Following the suspension of National Hunt racing in Britain, many leading British chasers including Roman Hackle and Medoc II were relocated to Ireland. Prince Regent however, maintained his position as the best jumper in the country, winning several major races and finishing second under top weight in the Irish Grand Nationals of 1943 and 1944. Plans to send the horse to race in England in the spring of 1945 were abandoned when he developed a warble on his back.

=== 1945/46 National Hunt season ===
Prince Regent returned in November 1945 and was beaten a head when attempting to concede 42 pounds to Roman Hackle at Leopardstown Racecourse. He then made his first appearance in England and won the Bradford Chase at Wetherby at odds of 1/10. On 14 March 1946 the eleven-year-old Prince Regent contested the Cheltenham Gold Cup and started the 4/7 favourite. The best of his five opponents appeared to be Red April (third in the Champion Hurdle) and the novice Poor Flame, whilst the other runners were the outsiders Elsich, Jalgreya and African Collection. Elsich took the early lead before falling and leaving Prince Regent in front. The challengers steadily dropped away and by the second last only Poor Flame was in any position to test the favourite. The novice made a bad jumping error and Prince Regent drew away to win by five lengths, with another four lengths back to Red April in third. The first Grand National for six years was run at Aintree Racecourse on 5 April and Prince Regent was made the 3/1 favourite despite top weight of 173 pounds in a race attracted a crown estimated at 400,000. He survived several jumping errors before taking the lead on the second circuit and, despite being repeatedly hampered by loose horses, reached the final fence with a clear lead. He tired on the run-in however and was beaten into third place by Lovely Cottage and Jack Finlay. At the same meeting, Prince Regent won the Champion Chase over two miles and seven furlongs.

=== Later career ===
The winter of 1946/47 was exceptionally severe and many National Hunt fixtures, including the Cheltenham Festival, were either cancelled or postponed. When the weather eased Prince Regent returned to England for a second attempt at the Grand National for which he was assigned a weight of 175 pounds and again started favourite, this time at odds of 8/1. In a race run in atrocious conditions with heavy ground and thick fog Prince Regent finished fourth of the fifty-seven runners behind the 100/1 outsider Caughoo. He returned to Aintree in November 1947 and won the Becher Chase. In the 1948/49 season Rank brought Prince Regent to England for his final season. He won the Bibury Chase at Cheltenham in December but was retired after falling in a race at Lingfield Park in 1949.

=== Race Record ===
Date	Racecourse	Distance	Race	Jockey	Weight	Odds	Field	Result	Margin
16 Mar 40	Baldoyle	2 miles	Raheny Plate (Bumper)	Mr T W Dreaper	10-12	20/1	17	10th	20 lengths
23 Mar 40	Phoenix Park	1 1/4 miles	Ardsallagh Plate (Bumper)	Mt T W Dreaper	11-0	20/1	16	12th	25 lengths
27 Apr 40	Naas	1 1/2 miles	Maudlins Plate (Bumper)	Mr T W Dreaper	12-0	4/5f	12	1st	4 lengths
17 Mar 41	Baldoyle	2 1/4 miles	St Patrick's Plate (Chase)	E Dempsey	11-7	100/8	6	5th	15 lengths
07 May 41	Phoenix Park	2 miles	Enniskerry Maiden Hurdle	E Dempsey	11-7	100/30	20	1st	Neck
16 May 41	Dundalk	2 miles 1f	Mickey McArdle Memorial Cup (Chase)	E Dempsey	11-10	5/2f	9	1st	1 1/2 lengths
22 Nov 41	Leopardstown	3 miles	Avonmore Plate (Handicap Chase)	E Dempsey	11-6	5/4f	5	2nd	Short Head
29 Nov 41	Navan	3 miles	Webster Cup (Handicap Chase)	E Dempsey	11-5	4/6f	11	1st	3/4 length
06 Jan 42	Naas	3 miles	Press Plate (Handicap Chase)	J Brogan	12-2	4/7f	8	1st	20 lengths
24 Jan 42	Leopardstown	3 miles 1f	Red Cross Handicap Chase	J Brogan	11-8	6/4f	19	Fell	
21 Feb 42	Navan	3 miles 1f	Ardmulchan Plate (Handicap Chase)	J Brogan	12-7	4/7f	14	1st	8 lengths
18 Mar 42	Baldoyle	3 miles	Baldoyle Plate (Handicap Chase)	T Hyde	12-7	4/6f	9	1st	1/2 length
06 Apr 42	Fairyhouse	3 1/2 miles	Irish Grand National (Handicap Chase)	T Hyde	12-7	5/2f	10	1st	1 length
21 Nov 42	Leopardstown	3 miles	Avonmore Plate (Handicap Chase)	T Hyde	12-12	3/1	11	3rd	16 lengths
05 Dec 42	Naas	2 1/4 miles	Naas Steeplechase (Handicap Chase)	T Hyde	12-7	9/4f	16	4th	10 lengths
02 Jan 43	Baldoyle	3 miles	Baldoyle Plate (Handicap Chase)	T Hyde	12-7	6/4f	6	1st	Neck
06 Feb 43	Baldoyle	2 miles 1f	Stewards Plate (Handicap Chase)	T Hyde	12-9	1/1f	11	1st	1/2 length
13 Feb 43	Naas	3 miles	Hospitals Handicap Chase	T Hyde	12-3	4/6f	12	1st	3 lengths
20 Mar 43	Leopardstown	3 miles 1f	Leopardstown Handicap Chase	T Hyde	12-7	1/3f	5	2nd	Head
26 Apr 43	Fairyhouse	3 1/2 miles	Irish Grand National (Handicap Chase)	T Hyde	12-7	5/4f	8	2nd	4 lengths
09 Oct 43	Phoenix Park	1 3/4 miles	Wicklow Plate (Flat)	Mr T Nugent	12-1	7/2	24	1st	1 1/2 lengths
04 Dec 43	Naas	3 miles	Naas Steeplechase (Handicap Chase)	T Hyde	12-7	1/1f	11	3rd	4 1/2 lengths
27 Dec 43	Leopardstown	3 miles	December Plate (Handicap Chase)	T Hyde	12-7	4/9f	8	2nd	10 lengths
12 Feb 44	Baldoyle	3 miles	Baldoyle Handicap Chase	T Hyde	12-7	2/1f	10	1st	8 lengths
10 Apr 44	Fairyhouse	3 1/2 miles	Irish Grand National (Handicap Chase)	T Hyde	12-7	7/4f	13	2nd	1 length
30 Sep 44	Phoenix Park	2 miles	Templeogue Plate (Flat)	Mr T Nugent	12-8	2/1f	22	2nd	6 lengths
14 Oct 44	Leopardstown	2 miles	Kilbride Plate (Handicap Hurdle)	T Hyde	12-7	6/1	13	4th	6 lengths
04 Nov 44	Curragh	2 miles	Irish Cesarewitch (Flat)	T Burns	8-7	100/7	30	7th	6 lengths
27 Dec 44	Leopardstown	3 miles	Bray Plate (Handicap Chase)	T Hyde	12-7	2/1	8	1st	5 lengths
10 Feb 45	Baldoyle	2 1/2 miles	Baldoyle Handicap Chase	T Hyde	12-7	7/4f	8	Fell	
10 Nov 45	Leopardstown	3 miles	Leopardstown Handicap Chase	T Hyde	12-7	2/1f	9	2nd	Short Head
15 Dec 45	Wetherby	3 miles	Bradford Chase	T Hyde	12-7	1/10f	6	1st	6 lengths
23 Feb 46	Baldoyle	2 1/2 miles	Baldoyle Handicap Chase	T Hyde	12-7	4/7f	6	3rd	1/2 length
14 Mar 46	Cheltenham	3 1/4 miles	Cheltenham Gold Cup	T Hyde	12-0	4/7f	6	1st	5 lengths
29 Mar 46	Liverpool	4 1/2 miles	Aintree Grand National	T Hyde	12-5	3/1f	34	3rd	00 lengths
12 Oct 46	Leopardstown	3 miles	Laragh Handicap Chase	T Hyde	12-7	6/4f	8	1st	3/4 length
00 Nov 46	Liverpool	2 miles 7f	Champion Chase (National Fences)	T Hyde	12-7	0/0	00	1st	00 lengths
05 Apr 47	Liverpool	4 1/2 miles	Aintree Grand National	T Hyde	12-7	8/1f	57	4th	00 lengths
12 Jul 47	Leopardstown	2 1/2 miles	Rathlin Handicap Chase	T Hyde	12-7	4/5f	14	5th	12 lengths
30 Jul 47	Galway	2 miles 5f	Galway Plate (Handicap Chase)	T Hyde	12-7	8/1	21	PU	Pulled Up
06 Dec 47	Liverpool	3 1/4 miles	Becher Handicap Chase (National Fences)	T Hyde	12-7	0/0	00	1st	00 lengths
00 Dec 48	Cheltenham	x miles	Bilbury Chase	A N Other	00-0	0/0	00	1st	00 lengths
00 Abc 49	Lingfield	x miles	Chase	A N Other	00-0	0/0	00	Fell	

== Assessment and honours ==
In their book, A Century of Champions, based on the Timeform rating system, John Randall and Tony Morris rated Prince Regent a "great" Gold Cup winner and the tenth best steeplechaser trained in Britain or Ireland in the 20th century. They described his 1946 Grand National performance as one of the best in the race's history. Prince Regent's name is remembered in Prince Regent Avenue, a residential street in Cheltenham.

== Pedigree ==
Pedigree of Prince Regent (IRE), bay gelding, 1935
Sire My Prince (GB) 1911	Marcovil (GB); 1903	Marco	Barcaldine
Sire My Prince (GB) 1911	Marcovil (GB); 1903	Marco	Novitiate
Sire My Prince (GB) 1911	Marcovil (GB); 1903	Lady Villikins	Hagioscope
Sire My Prince (GB) 1911	Marcovil (GB); 1903	Lady Villikins	Dinah
Sire My Prince (GB) 1911	Salvaich (GB); 1896	St Simon	Galopin
Sire My Prince (GB) 1911	Salvaich (GB); 1896	St Simon	St Angela
Sire My Prince (GB) 1911	Salvaich (GB); 1896	Muirninn	Scottish Chief
Sire My Prince (GB) 1911	Salvaich (GB); 1896	Muirninn	Violet
Dam Nemaea (IRE) 1921	Argos (GB); 1913	Sundridge	Amphion
Dam Nemaea (IRE) 1921	Argos (GB); 1913	Sundridge	Sierra
Dam Nemaea (IRE) 1921	Argos (GB); 1913	Mesange	Persimmon
Dam Nemaea (IRE) 1921	Argos (GB); 1913	Mesange	Golden Tresses
Dam Nemaea (IRE) 1921	Capdane (IRE); 1917	Captivation	Cyllene
Dam Nemaea (IRE) 1921	Capdane (IRE); 1917	Captivation	Cherry Duchess
Dam Nemaea (IRE) 1921	Capdane (IRE); 1917	Little Denmark	Queen's Birthday
Dam Nemaea (IRE) 1921	Capdane (IRE); 1917	Little Denmark	Floraline (Family: 5-f)
