= 1855 Grand National =

English steeplechase horse race

- Grand National
- Location: Aintree
- Date: 7 March 1855
- Winning horse: (Ireland) Wanderer
- Starting price: 25/1
- Jockey: John Hanlon
- Owner: Mr Dunn or Mr Dennis
- Conditions: Soft

The 1855 Grand National was the 17th renewal of the Grand National horse race that took place at Aintree near Liverpool, England, on 7 March 1855.

The race was originally scheduled for the previous week on February 28th but had to be postponed due to the severe frost, which had been the result of weeks of cold and snowy weather across the UK. This was the first time the race had been postponed from its original date.

The race was also marred by the fatal fall of former winner, Miss Mowbray, who suffered a broken back and neck when taking off too soon at Becher's Brook on the second circuit.

== Course ==
No major changes from previous years were reported to the course except that the seventh fence, in previous years described as a bank and ditch, now had some form of post and possibly rails as a post was dislodged during the race, bringing down one competitor. The fourteenth fence, in previous years described as the hurdle at the distance, was this year described as the Bush fence at the distance.

First circuit: Start At the field adjacent to the wheat field beyond the lane, Fence 1 {16} Ditch, Fence 2 {17} Low stump hedge and drain, Fence 3 {18} Post and Rails, Fence 4 {19} Old dead hedge with partial ditch on approach, Fence 5 {20} Becher's Brook, Fence 6 {21} Bank, Fence 7 {22} Bank, post and ditch, Fence 8 {23} Extreme Turn, Fence 9 {24} Valentine's Brook, Fence 10 {25} Hedge, Fence 11 {26} Post and rails, Fence 12 {27} Ditch, Fence 13 {28} Hedge at Canal Bridge.

The runners then turned at the first opportunity on re-entering the racecourse and made towards the fences in front of the stands. Fence 14 Bush fence at the distance, Fence 15 Artificial water jump, 13' 6" wide with a 3' high rail and 4' brook.

Second circuit: The runners then turned away from the Grandstands again and crossed Proceed's lane, into the a field known as the wheat piece before following the same circuit until reaching the racecourse again. This time the runners continued to the wider extreme of the course before turning to run up the straight in front of the stands. Fence 29 Long length hurdles, Fence 30 Distance hurdle.

The runners then bypassed the Bush fence and artificial Water Jump on the inside before reaching the winning post in front of the Main Stand.

== Leading contenders ==
Trout was 3/1 favourite and prepared at Stanton in Suffolk for the same owner, trainer, rider combination that were successful the previous year with Bourton and with so little racing having taken place over the early months of 1855, the public decided to stick with this combination, with very little else to go on. Jockey, John Tasker was taking his fifth ride in the race.

Miss Mowbray was 4/1 and reported to be in better condition than when she'd won the race three years earlier. Much support also came on the back of her having been got at to keep her out of last years race. Sam Darling Jnr was on board for his sixth ride in the race.

Dangerous was the 6/1 popular choice of the Merseyside public, despite the Grand National set to be his debut over fences or hurdles, which wasn't uncommon at the time. Their faith in his ability was due to the horse having been trained on sands of Merseyside while most of his rivals were confined to their stables in the harsh winter. His trainer, Fowler took this as his fourth ride in the race, having not yet previously completed the course.

Needwood was another locally supported favourite at 12/1, having been prepared for the race at nearby Hoylake during the bad winter. Chris Green, winner of the race in 1850 was to have taken the ride but suffered an injury at Coventry the previous day, giving an opportunity to a rider named Feek to be one of five making their debut in the race. The news of the jockey change on the day saw the horse drift in the market.

Bastion was next in the market at 15/1 despite having been given little to no preparation in the winter. However, the even year old Chestnut gelding was to be partnered by his trainer, Tom Olliver, continuing his unbroken record of having taken part in every official National back to 1839. The triple winner of the race was taking his seventeenth ride.

Little Charley, Maurice Daley and Peter were supported at 20/1 with little money placed on anything else in what one pressman described as the worst parade for a Grand National he'd witnessed He reserved particular scorn for some of the few Irish horses who made the trip, including 25/1 shot Wanderer, a rough undersized common looking hunter.

Several runners originally declared to run the previous week were missing when the race was set, including former duel winner, Abd El Kader who withdrew on the morning of the race.

== Race ==
The scheduling of the race as the fifth on the card for deep into the afternoon was heavily criticised by the press when the weighing out delayed it by a further three quarters of an hour, meaning the London press and visitors had to leave the course for the last train home before the race had taken place. This complaint had been lodged at the organisers of the National for the better part of a decade. Even the unaffected northern journalists advised that scheduling needed to change in the future, though they reserved their scorn, as in previous years, to the Railways, reporting very poor organisation at both the Liverpool and Aintree stations, with the short journey itself reported as taking an hour and a half. Their advice to the public was to avoid the train entirely if planning to return for the July meeting.

After the delay in weighing out, the formalities of the parade and start were completed without any further delay, Boundaway being first to show, going over the first fence. Garland, the favourite, Trout, Wanderer and Freetrader moved up to take up the running on the way down to Becher's Brook for the first time, which was cleared without incident.

Tom Olliver opted to take a completely different line over the first five fences on Bastion and considering his experience, it's surprising none of his rivals followed his example. It may have been he was looking for better ground, which resulted in his mount taking the lead on landing over Bechers, with Wanderer also getting the inside track as the runners began sweeping left towards the extreme turn, by which time Bastion had opened up a lead of around four lengths.

Peter exited the race at the post and rails along the canal side, fence eleven with Pimpern also missing when the runners came into sight at the top of the course, having fallen as many as three times on the first circuit.

That left eighteen runners in contention taking the bush fence at the distance chair and the artificial water jump. Bob Sly took Garland to the front, ahead of Bastion and Trout holding a two length advantage over Boundaway, Wanderer, Freetrader, Maurice Daley, Dangerous, Escape, Janus, The Nugget, Maley, Burnt Sienna and Cutaway the last of the main body. Little Charley, Miss Mowbray and Needwood were a little detached while Peter had re-joined them, having remounted to pass Half And Half. Pimpern arrived at the water jump a long way adrift with Edwin Weever choosing not to risk a bath in front of the crowd, sensibly retiring his mount.

Olliver again kicked on with Bastion opening a good lead as he crossed Proceed's Lane, again opting to try to take a different route to Bechers from everyone else, this time joined by Larry Byrne on Boundaway. However Olliver's mount fell at the fence before Becher's.

Freetrader was now in front of Wanderer, Trout and Dangerous as they took the brook while Miss Mowbray had been making steady progress, looking set to mount a good challenge when she clipped the top of the brook and suffered a horribly heavy fall that instantly broke both her neck and back. Sam Darling was hurled unconscious to the turf, brought round by a kick from a passing rival.

Eascape, Little Charley and Needwood were all unfortunate to exit the race at the fence before the extreme turn when Trout dislodged a post on the fence, taking the following three runners out of the contest, while Cutaway and Half And Half were now toiling, both having gone lame.

At the extreme turn Wanderer took it up from Maurice Daley, Freetrader, Boundaway, Dangerous, Trout, Janus and Burnt Sienna who had been creeping steadily closer after having been left badly at the start. The Nugget and Maley were the only others still in touch with Garland adrift at the rear with the remounted Bastion.

Trout, Burnt Sienna, The Nugget and Maley faded along the canal side to leave Wanderer, Freetrader, Maurice Daley, Janus, Boundaway and Dangerous to fight out the finish.

John Hanlon eased Wanderer a little on the turn for home to try to save something for the long run in as Freetrader and Maurice Daley disputed the lead going into the final two hurdles. Both struck the final flight, assisting Wanderer as he jumped cleanly before coming upsides and then passing both Maurice Daley and Freetrader, The latter tried to rally and make a race of it but the energy Hanlon saved on his mount came into play, keeping Freetrader at arms length to win cleverly by two lengths, with Maurice Daley a further four lengths down in third. Janus was a distance fourth, himself a distance clear of Dangerous. Burnt Sienna was next, ahead of The Nugget in seventh, completing the course solely to win a bet over Garland who was next with Boundaway walking in last. Bastion, Trout and Maley pulled up before reaching the final hurdle, walking in without passing the post. The race was completed in a time of ten minutes, twenty-five seconds.

== Finishing order ==
Position	Name	Jockey	Handicap (st-lb)	SP	Distance	Colours
Winner	Wanderer	John Hanlon	9-8	25-1	10 Mins, 25 Secs	Orange, green armbands, black cap
Second	Freetrader	Dan Meaney	9-4	50-1	2 Lengths	Black, white sleeves and cap
Third	Maurice Daley	Robert James	9-6	20-1	4 Lengths	Green, black sleeves and cap
Fourth	Janus	Harry Lamplugh	9-10	33-1	A Distance	Red, black cap
Fifth	Dangerous	W. Fowler	9-0	6-1	A Distance	Blue and white stripes, buff cap
Sixth	Burnt Sienna	T.J. Burrows	9-0	50-1		
Seventh	The Nugget	Walter White	10-4	50-1		White, azure sash and cap
Eighth	Garland	Robert Sly Jr	10-2	33-1		
Ninth and last	Boundaway	James Byrne	10-0	50-1	Walked in	
Fence 30	Maley	Fulman	9-6	50-1	Pulled Up	White, orange cap
Fence 30	Trout	John Tasker	10-12	3-1 Fav	Pulled Up	Red, white sash, black cap
Fence 22	Cutaway	Charles Boyce	9-10	50-1	Broke Down	White, black cap
Fence 22	Escape	James Knott	10-4	50-1	Knocked Over	Blue, yellow sleeves and cap
Fence 22	Needwood	Feek	11-2	12-1	Fell	Blue, yellow sleeves, black cap
Fence 22	Half-And-Half	George Darby	10-4	50-1	Broke down	
Fence 22	Little Charley	Denny Wynne	9-4	20-1	Brought Down	Purple, yellow sleeves, black cap
Fence 21 Bechers Brook	Miss Mowbray	Sam Darling Jnr	11-6	4-1	Fell fatally	Light blue, white cap
Fence 19	Bastion	Tom Olliver	10-4	15-1	Fell {Remounted and soon pulled up}	Black, white cap
Fence 11	Peter	T. Ablett	11-4	20-1	Fell {Pulled up after 1st circuit}	
Fence 10	Pimpern	Edwin Weever	9-6	50-1	Fell 3 times and tailed off	Blue, red cap

== Aftermath ==
While the winner had gone almost unquoted in the ring on the day of the race, many from Ireland had backed him before making the journey with one man seen kicking his hat around the ring in delight at the end of the race, having just won £1,300

It was noted that while the attendance was one of the best seen at Aintree for many years, the number of the aristocratic patrons of the turf was well down, due to the delay of the race by one week clashing with a sitting of Parliament. It was also noted that many of those who had previously been regular visitors to Aintree were now in the trenches at Sevastopol due to Britain's involvement in the Crimean War.

The death of former winner, Miss Mowbray was heavily reported with much sadness at her fate by the press

Jockey, John Tasker, who won the National the previous year on Bourton, and who this year partnered the Favourite, Trout was also killed, eleven days after suffering a fall in a race in October.
