= Roman Hackle =

British-bred Thoroughbred racehorse

- Sire: Yutoi
- Grandsire: Santoi
- Dam: Wanoya
- Damsire: Wavelet's Pride
- Sex: Gelding
- Foaled: 1933
- Country: United Kingdom
- Colour: Bay
- Owner: Dorothy Paget
- Trainer: Owen Anthony

Major wins
- Broadway Novices' Chase (1939); Cheltenham Gold Cup (1940)

Roman Hackle (foaled 1933) was a British Thoroughbred racehorse who won the 1940 Cheltenham Gold Cup. After winning several races over hurdles he was switched to steeplechasing in 1939 and made an immediate impact by winning the Broadway Novices' Chase. In the following year he won the Gold Cup as a seven-year-old but did not build on his early promise. In two subsequent bids for the Gold Cup he ran poorly when favourite in 1941 and fell in 1942. His British career ended when National Hunt racing in Britain was suspended in September 1942 but he went on to win races in Ireland.

== Background ==
Roman Hackle was a "giant, raw-boned" bay gelding bred in the United Kingdom. His sire Yutoi was a high class stayer who won the Cesarewitch Handicap in 1921. Roman Hackle's dam Wanoya was a great-granddaughter of the Belgian-bred broodmare Muirninn, whose other descendants included leading National Hunt stallion My Prince and the Belmont Stakes winner Amberoid.

During his racing career Roman Hackle was trained by Owen Anthony who had been a successful amateur jockey before taking up training: he had won the 1922 Grand National with Music Hall and trained Thrown In to win the Gold Cup in 1927.

== Racing career ==
Roman Hackle showed great promise early in his racing career, winning several hurdle races and one steeplechase before being bought as a six-year-old before the 1939 Cheltenham Festival by the eccentric English heiress Dorothy Paget. At Cheltenham he won the Broadway Novices' Chase, coming from an apparently impossible position at the last fence to defeat Up Sabre.

The outbreak of the Second World War led many leading owners to withdraw their horses from racing, but Dorothy Paget persisted, reportedly claiming that the sport was good for morale. Roman Hackle showed good form in the early part of the year and was strongly-fancied for the fifteenth running of the Cheltenham Gold Cup which was scheduled for 14 March 1940. The other leading contenders appeared to be Bel et Bon, Airgead Sios, Professor (favourite for the Grand National), Hobgoblin and Rightun. Snow fell on the eve of the race forcing a postponement of six days and several trainers used the delay to get another run into their horses. At Wolverhampton Racecourse Professor defeated Airgead Sios but neither horse made the eventual Gold Cup field: Airgead Sios sustained an injury in the race whilst Professor's connections opted to reserve their horse for the National. Roman Hackle however, won easily under top weight at Windsor Racecourse and started even money favourite for the rescheduled Gold Cup on 20 March. As part of the course had been ploughed up for wartime agricultural use the race was run over three miles, a quarter of a mile shorter than usual. Ridden by Evan Williams, the favourite was restrained in the early stages before taking the lead and never looked in any danger of defeat, winning easily by ten lengths from the outsider Black Hawk with the 1937 Grand National winner Royal Mail taking third at odds of 100/1. In his next start Roman Hackle finished third in the Lancashire Chase at Manchester Racecourse.

Roman Hackle showed inconsistent form in the early part of the 1940/41 National Hunt season but appeared to have returned to something like his best when winning at Plumpton Racecourse in early March. He was started favourite to repeat his 1940 victory in the Cheltenham Gold Cup but ran poorly and finished unplaced behind Poet Prince. Roman Hackle returned for a third attempt at the Gold Cup in 1942 but fell in a race won by Medoc II.

National Hunt racing was suspended in September 1942 and Roman Hackle was sent to race in Ireland. He recorded his last important success in 1945 when he won by a head at Leopardstown Racecourse although on that occasion he was receiving more than forty pounds in weight from the runner-up Prince Regent.

== Assessment and honours ==
In their book, A Century of Champions, based on the Timeform rating system, John Randall and Tony Morris rated Roman Hackle a "poor" Gold Cup winner. Roman Hackle's name is commemorated in Roman Hackle Avenue, a residential street in Cheltenham.

== Pedigree ==
Pedigree of Roman Hackle (GB), bay gelding, 1933
Sire Yutoi (IRE) 1917	Santoi (GB); 1897	Queen's Birthday	Hagioscope
Sire Yutoi (IRE) 1917	Santoi (GB); 1897	Queen's Birthday	Matilda
Sire Yutoi (IRE) 1917	Santoi (GB); 1897	Merry Wife	Merry Hampton
Sire Yutoi (IRE) 1917	Santoi (GB); 1897	Merry Wife	Connie
Sire Yutoi (IRE) 1917	She (GB); 1909	Cyllene	Bona Vista
Sire Yutoi (IRE) 1917	She (GB); 1909	Cyllene	Arcadia
Sire Yutoi (IRE) 1917	She (GB); 1909	Witty Girl	St Simon*
Sire Yutoi (IRE) 1917	She (GB); 1909	Witty Girl	Bettywise
Dam Wanoya (IRE) 1914	Wavelet's Pride (GB); 1897	Fernandez	Sterling
Dam Wanoya (IRE) 1914	Wavelet's Pride (GB); 1897	Fernandez	Isola Bella
Dam Wanoya (IRE) 1914	Wavelet's Pride (GB); 1897	Wavelet	Paul Jones
Dam Wanoya (IRE) 1914	Wavelet's Pride (GB); 1897	Wavelet	Wanda
Dam Wanoya (IRE) 1914	Nonoya (GB); 1902	Buccaneer	Privateer
Dam Wanoya (IRE) 1914	Nonoya (GB); 1902	Buccaneer	Primula
Dam Wanoya (IRE) 1914	Nonoya (GB); 1902	Salvaich	St Simon*
Dam Wanoya (IRE) 1914	Nonoya (GB); 1902	Salvaich	Muirninn (Family: 8-c)

* Roman Hackle is inbred 4S x 4D to the stallion St Simon, meaning that he appears fourth generation on the sire side of his pedigree and fourth generation on the dam side of his pedigree.
