= Workman (horse) =

Irish-bred Thoroughbred racehorse

- Sire: Cottage
- Grandsire: Tracery
- Dam: Cariella
- Damsire: Caricato
- Sex: Gelding
- Foaled: 1930
- Country: Ireland
- Colour: Brown
- Breeder: P. J. O'Leary
- Owner: Sir Alexander Maguire
- Trainer: Jack Ruttle
- Earnings: ca. £18,000

Major wins
- Grand National (1939)

Awards
- Leading National Hunt money winner (1939)

Workman was an Irish Thoroughbred racehorse best known for winning the 1939 Grand National.

== Background ==
Bred by a Dr. P. J. O'Leary in County Cork, Workman was a very large, powerful brown gelding sired by Cottage out of the Argentinian-bred mare Cariella. Cottage, bred by Baron Edouard de Rothschild in France, went on to sire two more Grand National Winners Lovely Cottage 1946 and Sheila's Cottage in 1948. Workman was sold as a two-year-old for forty guineas and went into training in Ireland.

== Early career ==
After winning a long distance steeplechase at Punchestown Racecourse in 1936 he was bought for 1500 guineas by the millionaire match manufacturer Sir Alexander Maguire and sent to be trained by Jack Ruttle at Hazelhatch Stud near Celbridge, County Kildare. There was a phrase coined after the great win " MacMoffat was no match for the Workman from the Hatch". He was the first all Irish horse to win the English Grand National, trained, owned, bred and ridden.

== 1939 Grand National ==
Workman finished third to the American stallion Battleship in the 1938 Grand National, having also finished third in the Irish Grand National in 1937. In the 1939 Grand National he carried a weight of ten stone six pounds and started at odds of 100/8 in a field of thirty-seven runners. The race was run on 24 March in unusually warm and sunny conditions. An unusual feature of the race was a large public gamble on a runner named Blue Shirt after a message in a bottle was washed up on the Irish coast tipping the horse to win. Ridden by Tim Hyde, Workman was not among the early front-runners, but moved up to take the lead at Valentine's Brook on the second circuit. Over the last two fences he was strongly challenged by MacMoffat, but pulled away on the run-in to win by three lengths with the favourite Kilstar fifteen lengths back in third. Eleven horses completed the four and a half mile course. Workman's prize of £7,284 made him the most financially successful horse of the 1938/9 National Hunt season and enabled Maguire and Ruttle to be the season's leading owner and trainer respectively.

For trainer Jack Ruttle it was his first English Grand National win after notching up three Irish Grand National winners with Halston in 1920 and 1922 and Poolgowran in 1934. Tim Hyde also had further success on English Turf when he returned in 1946 to win the Cheltenham Gold Cup on Prince Regent.

== Pedigree ==
Pedigree of Workman (GB), brown gelding, 1930
Sire Cottage (GB) 1918	Tracery (USA); 1909	Rock Sand	Sainfoin
Sire Cottage (GB) 1918	Tracery (USA); 1909	Rock Sand	Roquebrune
Sire Cottage (GB) 1918	Tracery (USA); 1909	Topiary	Orme
Sire Cottage (GB) 1918	Tracery (USA); 1909	Topiary	Plaisanterie
Sire Cottage (GB) 1918	Casetta (GB); 1910	Marco	Barcaldine
Sire Cottage (GB) 1918	Casetta (GB); 1910	Marco	Novitiate
Sire Cottage (GB) 1918	Casetta (GB); 1910	Creme Simon	St Simon
Sire Cottage (GB) 1918	Casetta (GB); 1910	Creme Simon	Settlement
Dam Cariella (IRE) 1926	Caricato (ARG); 1915	Craganour	Desmond
Dam Cariella (IRE) 1926	Caricato (ARG); 1915	Craganour	Veneration
Dam Cariella (IRE) 1926	Caricato (ARG); 1915	Caricia	Wagram
Dam Cariella (IRE) 1926	Caricato (ARG); 1915	Caricia	Caprichosa
Dam Cariella (IRE) 1926	Sembe (IRE); 1918	Santoi	Queen's Birthday
Dam Cariella (IRE) 1926	Sembe (IRE); 1918	Santoi	Merry Wife
Dam Cariella (IRE) 1926	Sembe (IRE); 1918	Lady In Waiting	Sir Edgar
Dam Cariella (IRE) 1926	Sembe (IRE); 1918	Lady In Waiting	Dame d'Honneur (Family: 2-e)
