= Alexander Maguire =

Sir Alexander Herbert Maguire (18 May 1876 – 20 January 1947), was a British industrialist who made his fortune from match manufacturing, producing the Maguire & Patterson brand amongst others. He played a significant part in the prohibition of poisonous white phosphorus from match manufacturing.

== Biography ==
Maguire was born in 1876, the son of match manufacturer J. T. Maguire of Liverpool. Alexander was educated at Waterloo College in Liverpool. In 1898, J. T. Maguire and his four sons – Alexander, David, Richard and Robert - left the Diamond Match Company of America to form Maguire, Miller & Co. In the 1900s Maguire worked on the White Phosphorus Matches Prohibition Act 1908 (8 Edw. 7. c. 42), for which he was knighted in the 1917 Birthday Honours. In 1919, with the death of two of his brothers and the retirement of another, he took over the directorship of the company and formed Maguire, Paterson and Palmer.

=== Horse racing ===
In 1939, his horse Workman won the Grand National, coming in at 100/8. It was ridden by Timmy Hyde and trained by Jack Ruttle.

== Personal life ==
In 1902, Maguire married Isabel Mary (née Todd). They had one son and two daughters. Maguire once owned Castle Tioram, on the island of Eilean Tioram, Scotland, and in the early 1920s lived at Coton Hall near Whitchurch, Shropshire.

His niece Isobel Maguire married Brigadier George Taylor CBE, DSO & Bar.

=== Alcoholism and death ===
In 1945, Maguire stayed in Upper Carlisle Road, Eastbourne. There he was treated by society doctor John Bodkin Adams, the suspected serial killer. According to Olwen Williams, Maguire's nurse, Adams plied the patient with whisky despite him being "an inebriate". Maguire soon moved back to London, where he died 18 months later from "chronic alcoholism".
