= 1938 Grand National =

English steeplechase horse race

- Grand National
- Location: Aintree Racecourse
- Date: 25 March 1938
- Winning horse: (United States) Battleship
- Starting price: 40/1
- Jockey: (England) Bruce Hobbs
- Trainer: Reg Hobbs
- Owner: (United States) Mrs. Marion duPont Scott
- Conditions: Good to firm

External videos
- Highlights of the 1938 Grand National (British Pathé)

The 1938 Grand National was the 97th renewal of the Grand National horse race that took place at Aintree near Liverpool, England, on 25 March 1938.

The steeplechase was won narrowly by American thoroughbred Battleship, a 40/1 shot ridden by 17-year-old jockey Bruce Hobbs and trained by Reg Hobbs, for owner Marion duPont Scott. Royal Danieli finished in second place, with Workman third and last year's second-placed Cooleen was fourth. Workman won the National the following year and Cooleen also finished fourth in 1939.

Battleship is the only horse to have won both the Grand National at Aintree and the American Grand National.

Thirty-six horses ran in the race, including the previous year's winner Royal Mail, who was pulled-up before the second Canal Turn with a broken blood vessel.

== Media coverage and aftermath ==
Winning rider Bruce Hobbs later explained that he had Fred Rimell to thank in part for his victory. Hobbs stated that Battleship had landed very steeply at Becher's Brook and cut his chin on the ground, causing the pair to come to the seventh fence wrong. Battleship had to veer sharply to take the jump and as Hobbs stated. "He caught me off balance and I was starting to fall off when suddenly I got a push up the bum back into the saddle" [From Rimell]. Of the finish Hobbs stated "I didn't hit the little horse because he wouldn't go for the stick, but he gave everything and got up and won. I thought it was half a length but they gave it as a head and all the Irish said if there was a photograph I would have been second." Hobbs himself never raced in the National again after a fall later that year resulted in a back injury that ended his riding career.

== Finishing order ==
Position	Name	Jockey	Age	Handicap (st-lb)	SP	Distance
01	Battleship	Bruce Hobbs	11	11-06	40/1	A Head
02	Royal Danieli	DL Moore			18/1	
03	Workman	Jimmy Brogan			28/1	
04	Cooleen	Jack Fawcus			8/1	
05	Delachance	John Moloney			100/9	
06	Red Knight II	Davy Jones			28/1	
07	Blue Shirt	Bob Smythe			8/1	
08	Hopeful Hero	Mr W Dawes			100/1	
09	Under Bid	Marius Pringle			40/1	
10	Bachelor Prince	Danny Morgan			25/1	
11	Lough Cottage	Richard 'Dicky' Black			40/1	
12	Provocative	Fred Rimell			22/1	
13	Drim	Mr BK Tighe			100/1	

== Non-finishers ==
Position/Fate	Name	Jockey	Age	Handicap (st-lb)	SP
Fell (1st)	Inversible	Matt Hogan			33/1
	Frobisher	Perry Harding			66/1
	Prominent Lad	Hywell Jones			100/1
	Dominick's Cross	Bob Everett			22/1
Fell (3rd)	Pontet	JE Parkinson			66/1
	Didoric	Don Butchers			50/1
	Emancipator	Mr CRD Gray			100/1
Fell (6th)	Brighter Cottage	W O'Grady			40/1
	Dawmar	Roger Burford			100/1
	Takvor Pacha	A Kalley			100/7
	What Have You	Sean Magee			100/1
	Hurdy Gurdy Man	John Hislop			100/1
	Cabin Fire	Tim Hyde			33/1
Fell (10th)	Airgead Sios	Thomas McNeill			25/1
	Stalbridge Park	Gerry Wilson			100/6
	K.D.H.	George Archibald			100/1
Fell (16th)	Rock Lad	Jack Bissill			66/1
	Tapinois	A Scratchley			100/1
	Blue Prince	Billy Parvin			50/1
Fell (22nd)	Dunhill Castle	Frenchie Nicholson			20/1
Fell (22nd)	Rockquilla	Thomas F Carey			28/1
Pulled Up (24th)	Royal Mail	Evan Williams			100/8
	Lazy Boots	Sir C Congreve			100/1
