= Dealtry Charles Part =

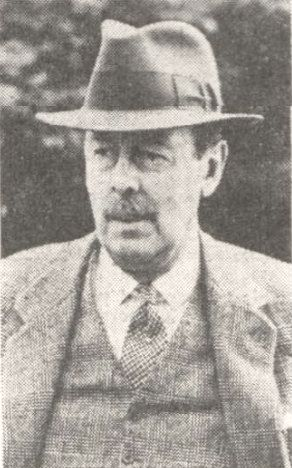
Lt Col Sir Dealtry Charles Part, in 1943

Sir Dealtry Charles Part OBE (28 February 1882 – 9 February 1961) was sheriff and Lord Lieutenant of Bedfordshire and an owner of race horses.

Part was the son of Charles Part and Isabella Mackintosh (of Mackintosh). He was educated at Harrow School and was commissioned into the 3rd militia battalion of the Queen's Own Cameron Highlanders in 1899. He was promoted lieutenant in 1901. He was commissioned into the regular army as a second-lieutenant in the 21st Lancers on 26 March 1902, was promoted lieutenant in 1907 and captain in 1911. He retired before the First World War, but was employed in the Army Remount Service from 1915 and ended the war as a lieutenant-colonel.

He was High Sheriff of Bedfordshire in 1926 and Lord Lieutenant of the county from 1943 to 1957. He lived at Houghton Hall, Houghton Regis Bedfordshire, and was Joint Master of the Hertfordshire Hounds. He also owned Morvich in Sutherland. In 1938 his horse, Morse Code, ridden by D Morgan, won the Cheltenham Gold Cup. He was knighted in 1957.

His first wife was Edith Christie-Miller, and after her death in 1957 he married Avice Myrtilla Long. His funeral at Aldenham parish church in 1961 was conducted by the bishop of Bedford.

Honorary titles
Preceded by The Lord Luke	Lord Lieutenant of Bedfordshire; 1943–1957	Succeeded by Simon Whitbread
