= Bobby Petre =

English jockey

Captain Robert Charles Petre (c 1912 - August 1996) was an English National Hunt racing jockey, during the 1930s and 1940s. He rode St George II to victory in the 1938 Cheltenham National Hunt Chase, and in 1946 he won the Grand National on Lovely Cottage.

After retiring as a jockey, he became a trainer at a small yard near Basingstoke. In 1948 he had to have his left leg amputated below the knee after a falling on a concrete slope at Bognor Regis. He died in August 1996 at the age of 84.
