= 1848 Grand National =

English steeplechase horse race

- Grand National
- Location: Aintree
- Date: 1 March 1848
- Winning horse: Chandler
- Starting price: 12/1
- Jockey: (England) Capt. Josey Little
- Trainer: Tom Eskrett
- Owner: (England) Josey Little
- Conditions: Heavy

The 1848 Grand National Steeplechase was the tenth official annual running of a handicap steeplechase horse race at Aintree Racecourse near Liverpool on Wednesday, 1 March. It attracted a then record, field of 29 competitors for a prize valued at £1,015 to the winner.

The race was won by Lieutenant Josey Little on Captain William Peel's Chandler trained by Tom Eskrett. Lieutenant Little wore Captain Peel's colours of white silks with black sleeves and cap. The horse won in a time of 11 minutes and 21 seconds, forty-two seconds slower than the course record set the previous year. With the proceeds of the race Lieutenant Little was able to purchase his promotion to the rank of captain in the 1st King's Dragoon Guards. Tom Olliver earned the distinction of being the only rider to have taken part in all ten official renewals of the race, finishing second on The Curate. The race was marred by the fatal falls of three competitors at the same fence in the latter stages of the second circuit, taking the total number of fatalities in the history of the race to five.

== The Course ==
The construction of the Liverpool to Bury Railway cut into the course immediately after Becher's Brook, which necessitated that the runners turn slightly to the left after the jump. This line to modern day Foinavon and The Canal Turn has remained the same since.

The posts and rails at both Brooks were removed and many of the hedges appeared to have been cut lower than in previous years. This caused much criticism from spectators.

The race was started from the lane that separated the racecourse from the line of country the runners would race. They would jump the four natural banks that separated the four fields that they would cross to reach Becher's Brook, which was now just a small bank and brook beyond. Two fences were taken on the slightly new line to take the runners towards the Canal Turn, the second of which was a double fence with a rivulet through it. The Canal Turn itself was a Timber fence before the runners jumped the second brook. A new fence was added after this, described as a strong post and rails. The remainder of the Canal side of the course consisted of a bank and ditch followed by another newly installed artificial water jump beyond a post, rails and hedge, which attracted a lot of spectator attention. The rails at Mess Bridge lane were removed, creating a long run back to the stands to jump the Chair and the water jump before completing the first circuit by jumping the sunken lane.

The runners covered the same line of country again before taking a wider line onto the course to jump two hurdles before the finish.

== The Race ==
The weather in the days leading up to the race was rainy, making travelling to the course from Liverpool on the wet muddy roads treacherous. This saw a reduction on the crowd size with notably fewer ladies in the more expensive areas of the stands.

The weather also led to the withdrawal of eight runners from the published race card, though still left a record field of twenty-nine starters. The press focused heavily on the participation of famed bare knuckle Boxer, Johnny Broome, as he had laid two heavy bets, one that he would be within four fields of the leader when they jumped the Chair and secondly that Blue Pill would win

The runners were allowed away at the second attempt, although many spectators cried that the start was if anything worse than the first, which had been recalled. Almost half the field were left up to 100 yards adrift and cause the runners to be widely strung out from the start.

The combination of the false start and the large field resulted in a lot of incidents of runners colliding during the race. Lord Strathmore suffered a foot injury early in the race when another runner smashed into him, effectively rendering him unable to assist his mount.

However, the biggest incident of the race came at the Sunken Lane where the leaders, Switcher and Saucepan both refused and badly hampered many of the runners from the mid to rear division.

The finish developed into a duel between Chandler and The Curate.

== Finishing order ==
No official returns for the Grand National exist prior to 1865. The return below is taken from the contemporary newspaper reports.

position	name	rider	age	weight	starting price	distance or fate	Colours
Winner	Chandler	Lieut Josey Little	12	11-12	12/1	1/2 a length	White with black sleeves and cap
Second	The Curate	Tom Olliver		11-02	6/1 favourite	1 & 1/2 lengths	Blue with red cap
Third	British Yeoman	Charles Bevill		10-08 {11-04}	30/1	1 & 1/2 lengths	White with black cap
Fourth	Standard Guard	William Taylor		10-12	100/6	Fell 3rd fence, remounted - 11 lengths	
Fifth	Sir Arthur	James Murphy		11-01	15/1	Last confirmed finisher	Green with black cap
Sixth*	Variety	Horatio Powell		10-08 [10-12]	25/1	Distanced	Orange with black cap
Seventh*	Naworth	William Archer		9-08	Not quoted	Distanced	Straw and light blue stripes with black cap
Eighth*	Wolverhampton	Bartholomew Bretherton		11-12	Not quoted	Fell & Remounted {2nd Valentines Brook} Distanced	Blue with white cap
Ninth*	Father Matthew	John Lamplugh		11-06	40/1	Hampered and refused sunken lane, continued tailed off	White with black cap
Distanced by judge	Sophia	William Ford		11-00	Not quoted	Fell at the artificial water jump [13], remounted but tailed off	Purple with red sleeves and black cap
Distanced by judge	Fortune-teller	Neptune Stagg		10-10	30/1	May have fallen on the second circuit, tailed off	
Distanced by judge	Aristides	Fogo Rowlands		11-01	Not quoted	Fell & remounted at 1st Valentine's, later tailed off	Blue with red cap
Distanced by judge	Switcher	Lord Strathmore		11-05	Not quoted	Rider suffered a foot injury in a collision at 1st Valentine's {10}	Straw and light blue stripes with black cap
Distanced by judge	Jerry	W. Sanders		11-07	Not quoted	Pulled up exhausted on the run in	Red with white sash and black cap
Distanced by judge	Saucepan	Tom Abbott		11-11	Not quoted	Refused at the sunken lane, went on, but faded at the hurdles	Red with black cap
Distanced by judge	Ashberry Lass	J. Collis	6	11-03	Not quoted	Hampered and refused sunken lane. Tailed off, pulled up and walked in	
Distanced by judge	The Gipsy Queen	W. Whitfield		10-06	40/1	faded after 2nd Becher's and walked in	
Non Finishers
2nd Mess Bridge Lane	Blue Pill	W Allensby		10-03		Broke down fatally	Red with black cap
Fence {28}	Counsellor	John Frisby		10-12	25/1	Broke down fatally	Green with red sleeves and cap
Fence {27} The strong post and rails	Mathew	Denny Wynne	10	11-10	8/1	Hampered and fell	Purple with straw sleeves and black cap
Fence {27} The strong post and rails	The Irish Bard	D. Freeze		11-00	20/1	Hampered and fell	
2nd Valentines	Sparta	T Turner		10-00	Not quoted	Fell	
Not recorded	Picton	N Burke		10-13	Not quoted	Tailed off by the ragged start and remained so until pulling up or falling.	
2nd Bechers {21}	Eagle	Johnny Broome		10-13	Not quoted	Unseated when tailed off	Red with black cap
Fence 20	The Sailor	William Holman	6	10-08	40/1	Fell fatally	Sky blue with white cap
End of 1st circuit	Half Breed Pioneer	J Neale		10-13	Not quoted	Broke down & pulled up	Cerise with white cap
Not recorded	Cheroot	W. McGee		11-02	Not quoted	Tailed off by the ragged start and remained so until pulling up or falling.	Sky with black cap
Fence 16	Khondooz	H Rackley		11-00	25/1	Fell fence 4, remounted, Fell again	Red and white hoops with white cap
Fence {3}	Mr O'Higgin's Pioneer	Captain William Peel	8	11-06	25/1	Hampered & fell	Black with red sleeves and cap

== Aftermath ==
The epic battle between Little and Tom Olliver earned the Captain the eternal respect of his professional rival, the two become best friends. Little rode for Olliver to win the 1853 race and years later, recalling his victory when they rode against each other he stated. "I hope I may have as straight a ride to heaven! If my cove had been an Archbishop instead of a Curate, The Chandler's shop would have been equally safe from burglars."

Lord Strathmore returned to the unsaddling encloser with half his boot missing and required medical attention for his injured foot while Turner, rider of Sparta also required medical attention after a heavy fall at Becher's second time.

There was also some criticism in the press over the severity of the race after several horses broke down, two of them, Blue Pill and Counsellor so badly they had to be destroyed, while a third horse, Sailor broke a leg in his fall, resulting in more equine fatalities in this National than all the previous runnings combined.

== Johnny Broome's bet ==
Bare knuckle Boxing champion, Johnny Broome became the first celebrity rider to take part in a Grand National when he entered to ride Eagle in the race, with his bet in place that he would be four fields from home by the time the winner passed the post, effectively meaning he would have crossed the lane at the top of the course and be back on the race-course proper. Broome also bet that Blue Pill, who would carry the same crimson colours, would win.

When the crowd got their first view of the leading group re-entering the racecourse for the final time, A crimson jacket was well up among the leaders, and when the jockey promptly pulled his mount up and dismounted, a majority in the crowd assumed this was Broome, having won his bet. However, it was actually Blue Pill, having badly broken down, while Broome was being cared for by spectators, having been unseated at Becher's second time round.

For most, including the man with whom Broome had laid his bet, this only became apparent when, the recovered Boxer arrived at the Waterloo Hotel to settle his bet, receiving great praise from the press and public in the process.
