= Tracery (horse) =

American-bred Thoroughbred racehorse

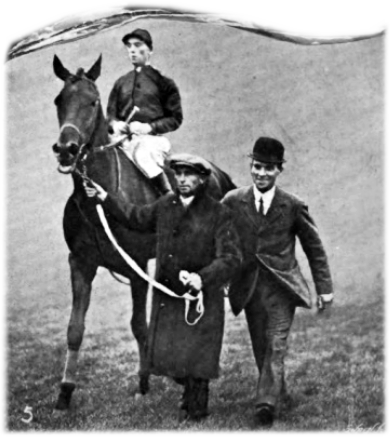
- Tracery with George Bellhouse up after winning the St. Leger
- Sire: Rock Sand
- Grandsire: Sainfoin
- Dam: Topiary
- Damsire: Orme
- Sex: Stallion
- Foaled: 1912
- Country: United States
- Colour: Brown
- Breeder: August Belmont Jr.
- Owner: August Belmont Jr.
- Trainer: John Watson
- Record: 9: 6–1–1

Major wins
- St. James's Palace Stakes (1912); Sussex Stakes (1912); St. Leger Stakes (1912); Eclipse Stakes (1913); Champion Stakes (1913)

Tracery (1909–1924) was an American-bred, British-trained Thoroughbred racehorse and sire, best known for winning the St. Leger Stakes in 1912. In a career which lasted from June 1912 until October 1913 he ran nine times and won six races. After finishing third on his debut in the 1912 Epsom Derby Tracery never lost another completed race at level weights. He won the St. James's Palace Stakes, Sussex Stakes and St. Leger Stakes in 1912 and the Eclipse Stakes and Champion Stakes as a four-year-old in 1913. He was brought down by a protester in the 1913 Ascot Gold Cup. After his retirement from racing he became a highly successful breeding stallion in Britain and Argentina.

== Background ==
Tracery was a brown horse bred in Kentucky by his owner August Belmont Jr. He was sired by the British Triple Crown winner Rock Sand, who had been sent to America in 1906 and proved successful as a breeding stallion. Tracery's dam Topiary (1900–1922) was not a great success as a racehorse but was a daughter of the French mare Plaisanterie, whose wins included the "Autumn double" (Cesarewitch Handicap, Cambridgeshire Handicap) in 1885.

Horse racing in New York State was suspended following the Hart–Agnew Law in 1908, leading many owners to relocate their horses. Belmont sent his colt to race in England, where he was trained by John Watson, the private trainer of the Rothschild family, at his Palace House stable in Newmarket, Suffolk.

== Racing career ==
=== 1912: three-year-old season ===
Tracery was entered in races as a two-year-old, but did not run as he had problems in training caused by "thorough-pins".

Tracery made his racecourse debut in The Derby on 5 June 1912. Tracery started a 66/1 outsider and finished strongly to take third place, six lengths behind the winner Tagalie. His performance disappointed the crowd as he deprived the King's colt Pintadeau of third by a short head. Later that summer, Tracery showed improvement to win the St. James's Palace Stakes at Royal Ascot in which he defeated the 2000 Guineas winner Sweeper. In the Sussex Stakes at Goodwood in July he again defeated Sweeper and became a leading fancy for the St Leger, with Lomond being regarded as his principal rival.

On 11 September at Doncaster Racecourse, Lomond started 6/4 favourite for the St Leger, with Tracery and Tagalie equal second in the betting at odds of 8/1. The American jockey Danny Maher had been expected to partner the horse but when he was obliged by his contract to take the mount on the outsider Charmian, the French-based George Bellhouse took over the ride. Bellhouse sent Tracery into the lead from the start and was never seriously challenged. In the straight he drew away from his rivals and won easily by five lengths from Maiden Erlegh. Tagalie and Lomomd finished sixth and seventh. The win was the first by an American-bred horse in the St Leger and was well received by the Doncaster crowd.

=== 1913: four-year-old season ===
As a four-year-old Tracery was aimed at the two and a half mile Ascot Gold Cup. He prepared for the race by running the Burwell Plate at Newmarket Racecourse over one and a half miles in which he was matched against Lord Derby's five-year-old Stedfast. After disputing the lead with the outsider Coora, Tracery took the lead in the closing stages and won comfortably from Jackdaw and Stedfast. The Gold Cup, which took place sixteen days after the "Suffragette Derby", featured a meeting between Tracery and the previous year's winner Prince Palatine. Tracery was leading the field with six furlongs to race when a spectator, identified as a Trinity College student named James Hewitt, ran onto the racecourse waving a suffragette flag and a revolver. After shouting a warning he attempted to grab the reins of the leader and was knocked to the ground. Tracery fell heavily, but was not seriously injured. His jockey, Albert "Snowy" Whalley, who also escaped unhurt, claimed that he would have won the race.

In July Tracery won the £10,000 Eclipse Stakes at Sandown Park, beating the 2000 Guineas winner Louvois by four lengths. According to press reports, he "outclassed" his opponents on this occasion. At Newmarket on 2 October started favourite for the £10,000 Jockey Club Stakes over one and three quarter miles but after taking the lead half a mile from the finish he was overtaken and beaten three lengths by Cantilever to whom he was conceding 34 pounds. Shortly before the race Belmont had reportedly turned down an offer of £35,000 for the colt. Only one horse, the French-bred six-year-old Long Set, opposed Tracery in the one and a quarter mile Champion Stakes later that month. Although his rival, the winner of the Cambridgeshire Handicap, Royal Hunt Cup and Doncaster Cup was well-supported in the betting, Tracery was never headed and won easily by six lengths.

== Assessment and honours ==
In their book, A Century of Champions, based on the Timeform rating system, John Randall and Tony Morris rated Tracery a "superior" winner of the St Leger and the best British-trained racehorse of his generation.

By the end of 1913, several commentators regarded Tracery as the best racehorse in the world, and he was described in the press as "one of the greatest gallopers of modern times."

== Stud record ==
Tracery began his stud career at the Rothschild's stud at Leighton Buzzard, standing at a fee of £400. He established himself as a successful breeding stallion, siring the 2000 Guineas winner The Panther in his second crop followed by other good winners including Papyrus (Epsom Derby) and Transvaal (Grand Prix de Paris). In 1920 he was sold for £53,000 (equivalent to £2,700,000 in 2023) and exported to stand as a stallion in Argentina where he sired the seven-time Argentinian champion sire Congreve. In 1923 a syndicate of European breeders including the Aga Khan, and Marcel Boussac bought the horse and returned him to England. In 1924 Tracery contacted colic and died at the Cobham Stud.

== Pedigree ==
Pedigree of Tracery (USA), brown stallion, 1909
| Sire Rock Sand (GB) 1900 | Sainfoin; 1887 | Springfield | St.Albans |
| Sire Rock Sand (GB) 1900 | Sainfoin; 1887 | Springfield | Viridis |
| Sire Rock Sand (GB) 1900 | Sainfoin; 1887 | Sanda | Wenlock |
| Sire Rock Sand (GB) 1900 | Sainfoin; 1887 | Sanda | Sandal |
| Sire Rock Sand (GB) 1900 | Roquebrune; 1893 | St. Simon | Galopin |
| Sire Rock Sand (GB) 1900 | Roquebrune; 1893 | St. Simon | St.Angela |
| Sire Rock Sand (GB) 1900 | Roquebrune; 1893 | St.Marguerite | Hermit |
| Sire Rock Sand (GB) 1900 | Roquebrune; 1893 | St.Marguerite | Devotion |
| Dam Topiary (GB) 1901 | Orme; 1889 | Ormonde | Bend Or |
| Dam Topiary (GB) 1901 | Orme; 1889 | Ormonde | Lily Agnes |
| Dam Topiary (GB) 1901 | Orme; 1889 | Angelica | Galopin |
| Dam Topiary (GB) 1901 | Orme; 1889 | Angelica | St.Angela |
| Dam Topiary (GB) 1901 | Plaisanterie; 1882 | Wellingtonia | Chattanooga |
| Dam Topiary (GB) 1901 | Plaisanterie; 1882 | Wellingtonia | Araucaria |
| Dam Topiary (GB) 1901 | Plaisanterie; 1882 | Poetess | Trocadero |
| Dam Topiary (GB) 1901 | Plaisanterie; 1882 | Poetess | La Dorette (Family: 19-a) |

== As a museum object ==
After his death, Tracery's skeleton was donated to the Yorkshire Museum and was on display until the 1950s. He was on display with the skeleton of another racehorse - Blink Bonny. In 1979 it was reported that one of these skeletons was reburied in an 'archaeological trench' by then Keeper of the museum George Willmot and the location of the other was a mystery.
