= Chandler (horse) =

British racehorse

- Sire: Dr Faustus
- Grandsire: Filho da Puta
- Sex: Gelding
- Foaled: 1836
- Country: United Kingdom
- Colour: Brown
- Owner: William Peel
- Trainer: Tom Eskrett

Major wins
- Grand National (1848)

Chandler, so called because he once pulled a chandler's cart was the winner of the 1848 Grand National steeplechase at Aintree near Liverpool, England when ridden to victory by Josey Little in the colours of Captain William Peel.

He was prepared for the race by Tom Eskrett and in one pre race at Warwick in 1847 it was claimed that the horse jumped a World record 39 feet when clearing a fence and four fallen horses in one leap.

He returned to defend his crown in 1849 but lost, finishing fifth.
