= Josey Little =

Joseph Lockhart Little (November 14, 1821 – February 17, 1877) known as Josey or the captivating captain was a soldier and steeplechase rider whose most notable racing victory was on board Chandler to win the 1848 Grand National.

Lockhart was born on 14 November 1821 to Archibald Little and his wife Agnes née Oliver at Shabden Park, Reigate and enlisted in the 40th Regiment of Foot on 7 August 1840. In December the same year he became a cornet in the more prestigious 1st King's Dragoon Guards before his Grand National victory in 1848 ensured for him the funds necessary to purchase his rank as Captain.

In 1850 Little was almost ruined in a bank collapse and was forced to transfer to the less prestigious 81st Regiment of Foot before retiring from the service in 1851.
He died aged 55 on 17 February 1877 at Paris, France.
