= Tim Hyde =

Irish jockey

Personal information
- Born: 1908 Ireland
- Died: 1967 (aged 58–59)
- Occupations: Jockey, Trainer

Horse racing career
- Sport: Horse racing

Major racing wins
- Grand National, Irish Grand National, Cheltenham Gold Cup

Significant horses
- Workman, Prince Regent

Timothy Joseph Hyde (1908–1967) was an Irish National Hunt racing jockey during the 1930s and 1940s.

Hyde began his career in show jumping before becoming an amateur jockey in National Hunt racing. After turning professional he had immediate success, winning the Irish Grand National in 1938 on Clare County and the Grand National in 1939 on Workman. He then became the regular partner of Prince Regent who won the Irish Grand National and the Cheltenham Gold Cup.

In 1951 he suffered a fall while showjumping, which left him partially paralysed for the rest of his life. Despite using a wheelchair, he trained horses for several years at Camas Park stables in Cashel, County Tipperary.

His son, also named Tim, became a successful bloodstock agent and breeder.

His grandson and great-grandson are also named Tim, and have continued the family tradition of riding a winner.

Hyde died in 1967.
