= Peter Simple (horse) =

British racehorse

- Sire: Patron
- Grandsire: Partisan
- Sex: Gelding
- Foaled: 1838
- Country: United Kingdom
- Colour: Bay
- Owner: Finch Mason; Joseph Little
- Trainer: Tom Cunningham; Tom Olliver

Major wins
- Grand National (1849, 1853)

Peter Simple was the third racehorse in history to win the Grand National steeplechase twice, emulating The Duke and Abd-El-Kader. After winning in 1849 the horse failed to complete the course during the next three years before winning again in 1853 at the age of 15, the oldest ever winner.

Peter Simple was a 20/1 shot in 1849 and a 9/1 shot in his 1853 victory at Aintree and was trained by Tom Olliver who was also the jockey. Josey Little was the owner.
