= Plaisanterie =

French-bred Thoroughbred racehorse

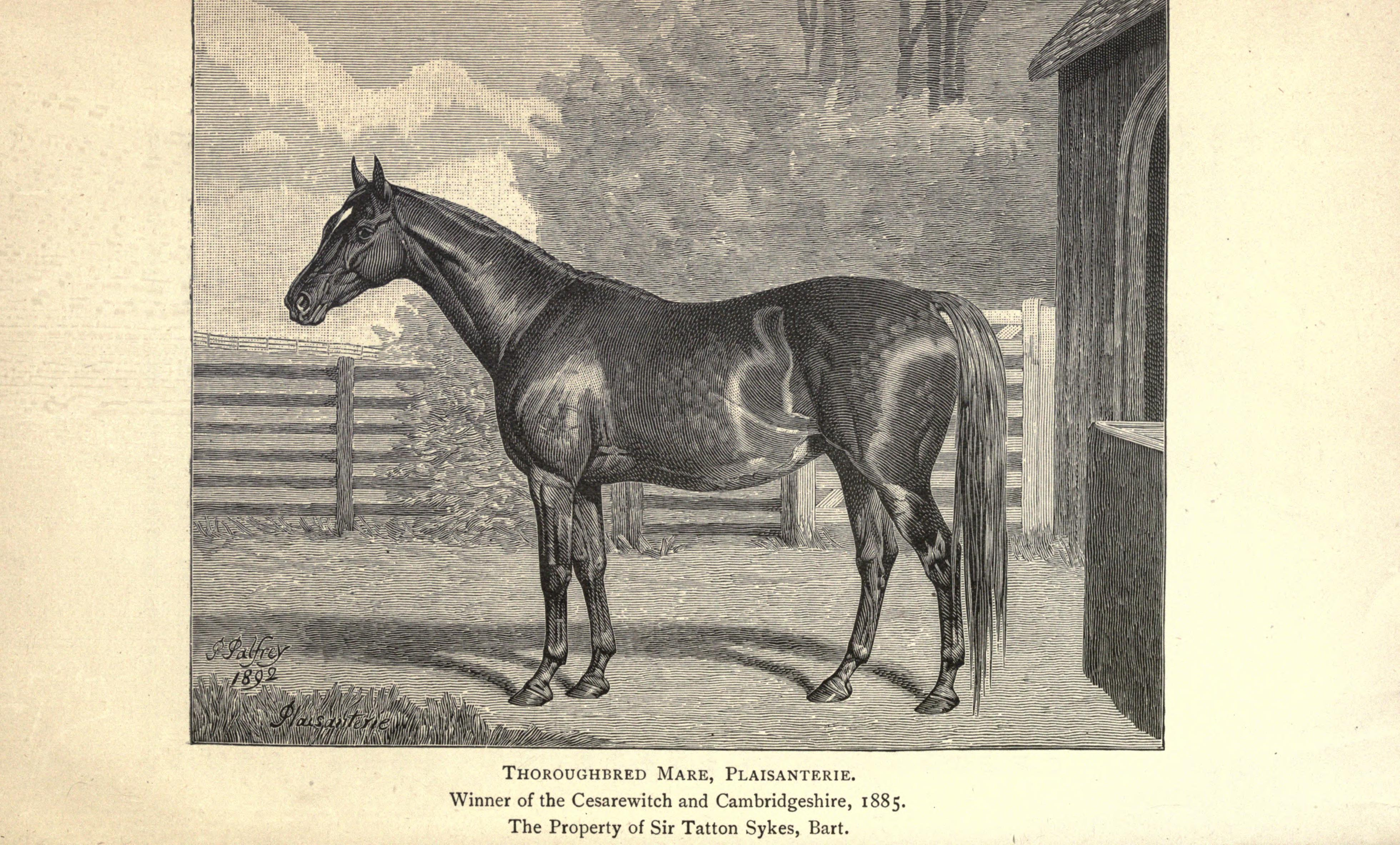
- From Light horses; breeds and management
- Sire: Wellingtonia
- Grandsire: Chattanooga
- Dam: Poetess
- Damsire: Trocadero
- Sex: Filly
- Foaled: 1882
- Country: France
- Colour: Bay
- Breeder: Haras de Menneval (Comte de Dauger)
- Owner: H. Bouy & Thomas Carter, Jr.
- Trainer: Thomas Carter, Jr.
- Record: 18: 16-2-0

Major wins
- Prix du Premier Pas (1884); Prix de Dieppe (1884); Grosser Preis von Baden (1885); Cambridgeshire Handicap (1885); Cesarewitch Handicap (1885); Prix de la Seine (1885); Prix des Cars (1885); Prix Saint-James (1885); Prix Fould (1885); Prix d'Apremont (1885); Prix du Cèdre (1885); Prix Seymour (1885); Prix de Chantilly (1885); Prix de Villebon (1885); Prix d'Octobre (1885); Prix du Prince d'Orange (1885)

Plaisanterie (1882–1906) was a Champion Thoroughbred racehorse.

== Background ==
Bred by the Comte de Dauger, she was sold in England for FF825 at the Tattersalls September yearling sale. She was purchased by trainer Thomas Carter, Jr., a member of the renowned English Racing Colony at Chantilly, in equal partnership with French scientist, Mr. H. Bouy of Senlis, Oise.

== Racing career ==
=== France ===
In her eighteen career races, Plaisanterie was beaten only twice, and both times by colts when she finished second by very narrow margins. Her first loss came at age two against colts in the Grand Criterium at Longchamp Racecourse in Paris when she ran second by a short head to The Condor. She would later reverse that form, defeating The Condor four times. At age three, Plaisanterie's second career loss came against older male horses at Longchamp in the Prix du Prince de Galles when she again was second by a short head. In three head-to-head meetings with the Prix de Diane winner Barberine, Plaisanterie won every time while winning the Prix de Dieppe, the Prix Seymour, and the Cambridgeshire Handicap.

=== International ===
In Germany on 24 August, she defeated her male counterparts in that country's most prestigious race, the Grosser Preis von Baden, beating The Condor by one and three-quarter lengths.

In October 1885 Plaisanterie was sent to England to contest the "Autumn Double" at Newmarket Racecourse, consisting of the Cesarewitch Handicap and Cambridgeshire Handicap, both of which were open to colts and older horses. On 12 October she carried 98 pounds in the two and a quarter mile Cesarewitch. Plaisanterie raced prominently and took the lead in the closing stages to win by two lengths from the five-year-old mare Xema. The win, the first in the race by a French-trained horse, meant that Plaisanterie had to carry an extra fourteen pounds penalty for the nine furlong Cambridgeshire two weeks later. Starting odds of 10/1 Plaisanterie disputed the lead from the start. In the closing stages she was never in danger of defeat and won "very easily" from the five-year-old Bendigo with the favourite St. Gatien finishing fifth. Plaisanterie thereby became the second of only three horses to complete the Autumn Double since the races were inaugurated in 1839.

== Retirement and stud career ==
Co-owner H. Bouy died unexpectedly on May 7, 1886 at age thirty-nine. At a subsequent dispersal auction, half-owner Tom Carter, Jr. paid FF150,000 for Plaisanterie. Retired to broodmare duty, Plaisanterie was bred five times to the Champion sire St. Simon and twice to another Champion sire, Orme. Her important foals include Childwick, Raconteur and Topiary. Her death was reported in October 1906.
