= List of Grand National winners =

Winners of the Grand National, a National Hunt horse race

The Grand National is a National Hunt horse race which is held annually at Aintree Racecourse near Liverpool, England. It is a handicap steeplechase over 30 fences and a distance of approximately 4 miles 3½ furlongs.

== Unofficial winners ==
=== Pre-1839 ===
The first official running of the "Grand National" is now considered to be the 1839 Grand Liverpool Steeplechase. There had been a similar race for several years prior to this, but its status as an official Grand National was revoked some time between 1862 and 1873.

Year	Winner	Age	Handicap (st-lb)	Jockey	Trainer	Owner
1836	The Duke	7		Capt. Martin Becher		Mr Sirdefield
1837	The Duke	8		Henry Potts		Mr Sirdefield
1838	Sir William	7	12-07	Alan McDonough		Mr Thompson

=== 1916–18 ===
For three years during World War I, the Grand National could not be run at Aintree, and so a substitute event was held at another racecourse, Gatwick. This venue is now defunct, and it is presently the site of London Gatwick Airport. The course was modified to make it similar to Aintree, and the races were contested over the same distance, with one fence fewer to be jumped. The 1916 running was titled the Racecourse Association Steeplechase and for the next two years it was known as the War National.

Year	Winner	Age	Handicap (st-lb)	Jockey	Trainer	Owner
1916	Vermouth	6	11-10	Jack Reardon	J. Bell	P. F. Heybourne
1917	Ballymacad	10	09-12	Edmund Driscoll	Aubrey Hastings	Sir George Bullough
1918	Poethlyn	8	11-06	Ernie Piggott	Harry Escott	Gwladys Peel

== Winners ==
Here is a full list of all the winners of Grand National. There were no winners between 1916-1918 because of World War I, 1941-1945 due to World War II, 1993 due to a series of false starts and 2020 due to COVID-19.

Year	Winner	Age	Handicap (st-lb)	Jockey	Trainer	Owner	SP	Winning time
1839	Lottery	9	12-00	Jem Mason	George Dockeray	John Elmore	9/1	14m 53.0s
1840	Jerry	10	12-00	Mr Bartholomew Bretherton	George Dockeray	Henry Villebois	12/1	12m 30.0s
1841	Charity	11	12-00	Mr A. Powell	William Vevers	Lord Craven	14/1	13m 25.0s
1842	Gaylad	8	12-00	Tom Olliver	George Dockeray	John Elmore	7/1	13m 30.0s
1843	Vanguard	8	11-10	Tom Olliver	see note below ^{[a]}	Lord Chesterfield	12/1	Not recorded
1844	Discount	6	10-12	Mr John Crickmere	Not recorded	Mr Quartermaine	5/1 JF	14m 0.0s
1845	Cure-All	7	11-05	Mr William Loft	Kitty Crisp	W. S. Crawford		10m 47.0s
1846	Pioneer	6	11-12	William Taylor	Not trained	Mr Adams		10m 46.0s
1847	Mathew	9	10-06	Denny Wynne	John Murphy	John Courtenay	10/1	10m 39.0s
1848	Chandler	12	11-12	Capt. Josey Little	Tom Eskrett	Josey Little	12/1	11m 21.0s
1849	Peter Simple	11	11-00	Tom Cunningham	T. Cunningham	Finch Mason, Jr.	20/1	10m 56.0s
1850	Abd-El-Kader	8	09-12	Chris Green	Joseph Osborne	Joseph Osborne		9m 57.5s
1851	Abd-El-Kader	9	10-04	Tom Abbott	Joseph Osborne	Joseph Osborne	7/1	9m 59.0s
1852	Miss Mowbray	7	10-04	Mr Alec Goodman	George Dockeray	T. F. Mason		9m 58.5s
1853	Peter Simple	15	10-10	Tom Olliver	Tom Olliver	Josey Little	9/1	10m 37.5s
1854	Bourton	11	11-12	John Tasker	Henry Wadlow	William Moseley	4/1 F	9m 59.0s
1855	Wanderer	10	09-08	John Hanlon	Not known	Mr Dunn	25/1	10m 25.0s
1856	Freetrader	7	09-06	George Stevens	William Holman	W. Barnett	25/1	10m 9.5s
1857	Emigrant	11	09-10	Charlie Boyce	Charlie Boyce	George Hodgman	10/1	10m 6.0s
1858	Little Charley	10	10-07	William Archer	William Holman	Christopher Capel	100/6	11m 5.0s
1859	Half Caste	6	09-07	Chris Green	Chris Green	Mr Willoughby	7/1	10m 2.0s
1860	Anatis	10	09-10	Mr Tommy Pickernell	H. E. May	Christopher Capel	7/2 F	Not recorded
1861	Jealousy	7	09-12	Joseph Kendall	Charles Balchin	J. Bennett	5/1	10m 14.0s
1862	The Huntsman	9	11-00	Harry Lamplugh	Harry Lamplugh	Viscount de Namur	3/1 F	9m 30.0s
1863	Emblem	7	10-10	George Stevens	Edwin Weever	Lord Coventry	4/1	11m 20.0s
1864	Emblematic	6	10-06	George Stevens	Edwin Weever	Lord Coventry	10/1	11m 50.0s
1865	Alcibiade	5	11-04	Capt. Henry Coventry	Cornell	Cherry Angell	100/7	11m 16.0s
1866	Salamander	7	10-07	Mr Alec Goodman	J. Walters	Edward Studd	40/1	11m 5.0s
1867	Cortolvin	8	11-13	John Page	Harry Lamplugh	Duke of Hamilton	16/1	10m 42.0s
1868	The Lamb	6	10-07	Mr George Ede	Ben Land	Lord Poulett	9/1	Not recorded
1869	The Colonel	6	10-07	George Stevens	R. Roberts	John Weyman	100/7	11m 0.0s
1870	The Colonel	7	11-12	George Stevens	R. Roberts	Matthew Evans	7/2 F	10m 10.0s
1871	The Lamb	9	11-05	Mr Tommy Pickernell	Chris Green	Lord Poulett	11/2	9m 35.7s
1872	Casse Tete	7	10-00	John Page	A. Cowley	Teddy Brayley	20/1	10m 14.5s
1873	Disturbance	6	11-11	Mr J. M. Richardson	Mr J. M. Richardson	James Machell	20/1	Watch stopped
1874	Reugny	6	10-12	Mr J. M. Richardson	Mr J. M. Richardson	James Machell	5/1 F	10m 4.0s
1875	Pathfinder	8	10-11	Mr Tommy Pickernell	W. Reeves	Hubert Bird	100/6	10m 22.0s
1876	Regal	5	11-03	Joe Cannon	James Jewitt	James Machell	25/1	11m 14.0s
1877	Austerlitz	5	10-08	Mr Fred Hobson	Robert I'Anson	Fred Hobson	15/1	10m 10.0s
1878	Shifnal	9	10-12	J. Jones	John Nightingall	John Nightingall	7/1	10m 23.0s
1879	The Liberator	10	11-04	Mr Garrett Moore	J. Moore	Garrett Moore	5/1	10m 12.0s
1880	Empress	5	10-07	Mr Tommy Beasley	Henry Linde	Pierre Ducrot	8/1	10m 20.0s
1881	Woodbrook	7	11-03	Mr Tommy Beasley	Henry Linde	T. Kirkwood	11/2 JF	11m 50.0s
1882	Seaman	6	11-06	Lord Manners	James Machell/James Jewitt	Lord Manners	10/1	10m 42.4s
1883	Zoedone	6	11-00	Count Karel Kinsky (AUT)	W. Jenkins	Count Karel Kinsky	100/7	11m 39.0s
1884	Voluptuary	6	10-05	Mr Ted Wilson	William Wilson	H. F. Boyd	10/1	10m 5.0s
1885	Roquefort	6	11-00	Mr Ted Wilson	Arthur Yates	Arthur Cooper	10/3 F	10m 10.0s
1886	Old Joe	7	10-09	Tommy Skelton	George Mulcaster	A. J. Douglas	25/1	10m 14.6s
1887	Gamecock	8	11-00	Bill Daniels	James Gordon	E. Jay	20/1	10m 10.2s
1888	Playfair	7	10-07	George Mawson	Tom Cannon, Sr.	Ned Baird	40/1	10m 12.0s
1889	Frigate	11	11-04	Mr Tommy Beasley	M. A. Maher	Mat Maher	8/1	10m 1.2s
1890	Ilex	6	10-05	Arthur Nightingall	John Nightingall	George Masterman	4/1 F	10m 41.8s
1891	Come Away	7	11-12	Mr Harry Beasley	Harry Beasley	Willie Jameson	4/1 F	9m 58.0s
1892	Father O'Flynn	7	10-05	Capt. Roddy Owen	Gordon Wilson	Gordon Wilson	20/1	9m 48.2s
1893	Cloister	9	12-07	Bill Dollery	Arthur Yates	Charles Duff	9/2 F	9m 32.4s
1894	Why Not	13	11-13	Arthur Nightingall	Willie Moore	C. H. Fenwick	5/1 JF	9m 45.4s
1895	Wild Man From Borneo	7	10-11	Mr Joe Widger	James Gatland	John Widger	10/1	10m 32.0
1896	The Soarer	7	09-13	Lt. David Campbell	Willie Moore	William Hall Walker	40/1	10m 11.2s
1897	Manifesto	9	11-03	Terry Kavanagh	Willie McAuliffe	Harry Dyas	6/1 F	9m 49s
1898	Drogheda	6	10-12	John Gourley	Dick Dawson	C. G. M. Adams	25/1	9m 43.6s
1899	Manifesto	11	12-07	George Williamson	Willie Moore	John Bulteel	5/1	9m 49.8s
1900	Ambush II	6	11-03	Algy Anthony	Algy Anthony	Prince of Wales	4/1	10m 1.4s
1901	Grudon	11	10-00	Arthur Nightingall	Bernard Bletsoe	Bernard Bletsoe	9/1	9m 47.8s
1902	Shannon Lass	7	10-01	David Read	James Hackett	Ambrose Gorham	20/1	10m 3.6s
1903	Drumcree	9	11-03	Percy Woodland	Sir Charles Nugent	John Morrison	13/2 F	10m 9.4s
1904	Moifaa	8	10-07	Arthur Birch	W. Hickey	Spencer Gollan	25/1	9m 58.6s
1905	Kirkland	9	11-05	Frank Mason	E. Thomas	Frank Bibby	6/1	9m 48.8s
1906	Ascetic's Silver	9	10-09	Mr Aubrey Hastings	Aubrey Hastings	Prince F. Hatzfeldt	20/1	9m 34.4s
1907	Eremon	7	10-01	Alf Newey	Tom Coulthwaite	Stanley Howard	8/1	9m 47.5s
1908	Rubio	10	10-05	Henry Bletsoe	Fred Withington	F. Douglas-Pennant	66/1	10m 33.2s
1909	Lutteur III	5	10-11	Georges Parfrement	Harry Escott	James Hennessy	100/9	9m 53.8s
1910	Jenkinstown	9	10-05	Robert Chadwick	Tom Coulthwaite	Stanley Howard	100/8	10m 44.2s
1911	Glenside	9	10-03	Mr Jack Anthony	R. H. Collis	Frank Bibby	20/1	10m 35.0s
1912	Jerry M	9	12-07	Ernie Piggott	Robert Gore	Sir C. Assheton-Smith	4/1 JF	10m 13.4s
1913	Covertcoat	7	11-06	Percy Woodland	Robert Gore	Sir C. Assheton-Smith	100/9	10m 19.0s
1914	Sunloch	8	09-07	Bill Smith	Tom Tyler	Tom Tyler	100/6	9m 58.8s
1915	Ally Sloper	6	10-06	Mr Jack Anthony	Aubrey Hastings	Lady Margaret Nelson	100/8	9m 47.8s
1916–1918	No races held due to World War I							
1919	Poethlyn	9	12-07	Ernie Piggott	Harry Escott	Gwladys Peel	11/4 F	10m 8.4s
1920	Troytown	7	11-09	Mr Jack Anthony	Algy Anthony	T. Collins-Gerrard	6/1	10m 20.4s
1921	Shaun Spadah	10	11-07	Dick Rees	George Poole	Malcolm McAlpine	100/9	10m 26.0s
1922	Music Hall	9	11-08	Lewis Rees	Owen Anthony	Hugh Kershaw	100/9	9m 55.8s
1923	Sergeant Murphy	13	11-03	Capt. Tuppy Bennett	George Blackwell	Stephen Sanford	100/6	9m 36.0s
1924	Master Robert	11	10-05	Bob Trudgill	Aubrey Hastings	Lord Airlie	25/1	9m 40.0s
1925	Double Chance	9	10-09	Maj. John Wilson	Fred Archer, Jr.	David Goold	100/9	9m 42.6s
1926	Jack Horner	9	10-05	William Watkinson	Harvey Leader	Charles Schwartz	25/1	9m 36.0s
1927	Sprig	10	12-04	Ted Leader	Tom Leader	Mary Partridge	8/1 F	10m 20.2s
1928	Tipperary Tim	10	10-00	Mr Bill Dutton	Joseph Dodd	Harold Kenyon	100/1	10m 23.4s
1929	Gregalach	7	11-04	Robert W H Everett	Tom Leader	Margaret Gemmell	100/1	9m 47.4s
1930	Shaun Goilin	10	11-07	Tommy Cullinan	Frank Hartigan	Walter Midwood	100/8	9m 40.6s
1931	Grakle	9	11-07	Bob Lyall	Tom Coulthwaite	Cecil Taylor	100/6	9m 32.8s
1932	Forbra	7	10-07	Tim Hamey	Tom Rimell	William Parsonage	50/1	9m 44.6s
1933	Kellsboro' Jack	7	11-09	Dudley Williams	Ivor Anthony	Mrs F. Ambrose Clark	25/1	9m 28.0s
1934	Golden Miller	7	12-02	Gerry Wilson	Basil Briscoe	Dorothy Paget	8/1	9m 20.4s
1935	Reynoldstown	8	11-04	Mr Frank Furlong	Noel Furlong	Noel Furlong	22/1	9m 20.2s
1936	Reynoldstown	9	12-02	Mr Fulke Walwyn	Noel Furlong	Noel Furlong	10/1	9m 37.8s
1937	Royal Mail	8	11-13	Evan Williams	Ivor Anthony	Hugh Lloyd Thomas	100/6	9m 59.8s
1938	Battleship	11	11-06	Bruce Hobbs	Reg Hobbs	Marion Scott	40/1	9m 27.0s
1939	Workman	9	10-06	Tim Hyde	Jack Ruttle	Sir Alexander Maguire	100/8	9m 42.2s
1940	Bogskar	7	10-04	Mervyn Jones	Lord Stalbridge	Lord Stalbridge	25/1	9m 20.6s
1941–1945	No races held due to World War II							
1946	Lovely Cottage	9	10-08	Capt. Bobby Petre	Tommy Rayson	John Morant	25/1	9m 38.2s
1947	Caughoo	8	10-00	Eddie Dempsey	Herbert McDowell	John McDowell	100/1	10m 3.8s
1948	Sheila's Cottage	9	10-07	Arthur Thompson	Neville Crump	John Procter	50/1	9m 25.4s
1949	Russian Hero	9	10-08	Leo McMorrow	George Owen	Fearnie Williamson	66/1	9m 24.2s
1950	Freebooter	9	11-11	Jimmy Power	Bobby Renton	Lurline Brotherton	10/1 F	9m 24.2s
1951	Nickel Coin	9	10-01	John Bullock	Jack O'Donoghue	Jeffrey Royle	40/1	9m 48.8s
1952	Teal	10	10-12	Arthur Thompson	Neville Crump	Harry Lane	100/7	9m 21.5s
1953	Early Mist	8	11-02	Bryan Marshall	Vincent O'Brien	Joe Griffin	20/1	9m 22.8s
1954	Royal Tan	10	11-07	Bryan Marshall	Vincent O'Brien	Joe Griffin	8/1	9m 32.8s
1955	Quare Times	9	11-00	Pat Taaffe	Vincent O'Brien	Cecily Welman	100/9	10m 19.2s
1956	E.S.B.	10	11-03	David Dick	Fred Rimell	Mrs Leonard Carver	100/7	9m 21.4s
1957	Sundew	11	11-07	Fred Winter	Frank Hudson	Mrs Geoffrey Kohn	20/1	9m 42.4s
1958	Mr. What	8	10-06	Arthur Freeman	Tom Taaffe, Sr.	David J. Coughlan	18/1	9m 59.8s
1959	Oxo	8	10-13	Michael Scudamore	Willie Stephenson	John Bigg	8/1	9m 37.8s
1960	Merryman II	9	10-12	Gerry Scott	Neville Crump	Winifred Wallace	13/2 F	9m 26.2s
1961	Nicolaus Silver	9	10-01	Bobby Beasley	Fred Rimell	Charles Vaughan	28/1	9m 22.6s
1962	Kilmore	12	10-04	Fred Winter	Ryan Price	Nat Cohen	28/1	9m 50s
1963	Ayala	9	10-00	Pat Buckley	Keith Piggott	Pierre Raymond	66/1	9m 35.8s
1964	Team Spirit	12	10-03	Willie Robinson	Fulke Walwyn	John Goodman	18/1	9m 46.8s
1965	Jay Trump	8	11-05	Tommy Smith	Fred Winter	Mary Stephenson	100/6	9m 30.6s
1966	Anglo	8	10-00	Tim Norman	Fred Winter	Stuart Levy	50/1	9m 52.8s
1967	Foinavon	9	10-00	John Buckingham	John Kempton	Cyril Watkins	100/1	9m 49.6s
1968	Red Alligator	9	10-00	Brian Fletcher	Denys Smith	John Manners	100/7	9m 28.8s
1969	Highland Wedding	12	10-04	Eddie Harty, Sr.	Toby Balding	Thomas McCoy, Jr. (USA) & Charles Burns (CAN)	100/9	9m 30.8s
1970	Gay Trip	8	11-05	Pat Taaffe	Fred Rimell	Tony Chambers	15/1	9m 38s
1971	Specify	9	10-13	John Cook	John Sutcliffe	Fred Pontin	28/1	9m 34.2s
1972	Well To Do	9	10-01	Graham Thorner	Tim Forster	Tim Forster	14/1	10m 8.4s
1973	Red Rum	8	10-05	Brian Fletcher	Ginger McCain	Noel Le Mare	9/1 JF	9m 1.9s
1974	Red Rum	9	12-00	Brian Fletcher	Ginger McCain	Noel Le Mare	11/1	9m 20.3s
1975	L'Escargot	12	11-03	Tommy Carberry	Dan Moore	Raymond R. Guest (USA)	13/2	9m 31.1s
1976	Rag Trade	10	10-12	John Burke	Fred Rimell	Pierre Raymond	14/1	9m 20.9s
1977	Red Rum	12	11-08	Tommy Stack	Ginger McCain	Noel Le Mare	9/1	9m 30.3s
1978	Lucius	9	10-09	Bob Davies	Gordon W. Richards	Fiona Whitaker	14/1	9m 33.9s
1979	Rubstic	10	10-00	Maurice Barnes	John Leadbetter	John Douglas	25/1	9m 52.9s
1980	Ben Nevis	12	10-12	Mr Charlie Fenwick (USA)	Tim Forster	R. C. Stewart, Jr. (USA)	40/1	10m 17.4s
1981	Aldaniti	11	10-13	Bob Champion	Josh Gifford	Nick Embiricos	10/1	9m 47.2s
1982	Grittar	9	11-05	Mr Dick Saunders	Frank Gilman	Frank Gilman	7/1 F	9m 12.6s
1983	Corbiere	8	11-04	Ben de Haan	Jenny Pitman	Bryan Burrough	13/1	9m 47.4s
1984	Hallo Dandy	10	10-02	Neale Doughty	Gordon W. Richards	Richard Shaw	13/1	9m 21.4s
1985	Last Suspect	11	10-05	Hywel Davies	Tim Forster	Anne, Duchess of Westminster	50/1	9m 42.7s
1986	West Tip	9	10-11	Richard Dunwoody	Michael Oliver	Peter Luff	15/2	9m 33.0s
1987	Maori Venture	11	10-13	Steve Knight	Andrew Turnell	Jim Joel	28/1	9m 19.3s
1988	Rhyme 'n' Reason	9	11-00	Brendan Powell	David Elsworth	Juliet Reed	10/1	9m 53.5s
1989	Little Polveir	12	10-03	Jimmy Frost	Toby Balding	Edward Harvey	28/1	10m 6.9s
1990	Mr Frisk	11	10-06	Mr Marcus Armytage	Kim Bailey	Lois Duffey (USA)	16/1	8m 47.8s (record)
1991	Seagram	11	10-06	Nigel Hawke	David Barons	Sir Eric Parker	12/1	9m 29.9s
1992	Party Politics	8	10-07	Carl Llewellyn	Nick Gaselee	Patricia Thompson	14/1	9m 6.4s
1993	Race void							
1994	Miinnehoma	11	10-08	Richard Dunwoody	Martin Pipe	Freddie Starr	16/1	10m 18.8s
1995	Royal Athlete	12	10-06	Jason Titley	Jenny Pitman	G. & L. Johnson	40/1	9m 4.1s
1996	Rough Quest	10	10-07	Mick Fitzgerald	Terry Casey	Andrew Wates	7/1 F	9m 0.8s
1997	Lord Gyllene	9	10-00	Tony Dobbin	Steve Brookshaw	Stan Clarke	14/1	9m 5.9s
1998	Earth Summit	10	10-05	Carl Llewellyn	Nigel Twiston-Davies	Summit Partnership	7/1 F	10m 51.5s
1999	Bobbyjo	9	10-00	Paul Carberry	Tommy Carberry	Bobby Burke	10/1	9m 14.1s
2000	Papillon	9	10-12	Ruby Walsh	Ted Walsh	Mrs J. Maxwell Moran (USA)	10/1	9m 9.7s
2001	Red Marauder	11	10-11	Richard Guest	Norman Mason	Norman Mason	33/1	11m 0.1s
2002	Bindaree	8	10-04	Jim Culloty	Nigel Twiston-Davies	Raymond Mould	20/1	9m 8.6s
2003	Monty's Pass	10	10-07	Barry Geraghty	Jimmy Mangan	Dee Racing Syndicate	16/1	9m 21.7s
2004	Amberleigh House	12	10-10	Graham Lee	Ginger McCain	Halewood Int. Ltd	16/1	9m 20.3s
2005	Hedgehunter	9	11-01	Ruby Walsh	Willie Mullins	Trevor Hemmings	7/1 F	9m 20.8s
2006	Numbersixvalverde	10	10-08	Niall Madden	Martin Brassil	Bernard Carroll	11/1	9m 41.0s
2007	Silver Birch	10	10-06	Robbie Power	Gordon Elliott	Brian Walsh	33/1	9m 13.6s
2008	Comply or Die	9	10-09	Timmy Murphy	David Pipe	David Johnson	7/1 JF	9m 16.6s
2009	Mon Mome	9	11-00	Liam Treadwell	Venetia Williams	Vida Bingham	100/1	9m 32.9s
2010	Don't Push It	10	11-05	Tony McCoy	Jonjo O'Neill	J. P. McManus	10/1 JF	9m 4.6s
2011	Ballabriggs	10	11-00	Jason Maguire	Donald McCain, Jr.	Trevor Hemmings	14/1	9m 1.2s
2012	Neptune Collonges	11	11-06	Daryl Jacob	Paul Nicholls	John Hales	33/1	9m 5.1s
2013	Auroras Encore	11	10-03	Ryan Mania	Sue Smith	Douglas Pryde, Jim Beaumont and David P van der Hoeven	66/1	9m 12.0s
2014	Pineau De Re	11	10-06	Leighton Aspell	Dr Richard Newland	John Provan	25/1	9m 9.9s
2015	Many Clouds	8	11-09	Leighton Aspell	Oliver Sherwood	Trevor Hemmings	25/1	8m 56.8s
2016	Rule The World	9	10-07	David Mullins	Mouse Morris	Gigginstown House Stud	33/1	9m 29.0s
2017	One For Arthur	8	10-11	Derek Fox	Lucinda Russell	Deborah Thomson & Belinda McClung	14/1	9m 3.5s
2018	Tiger Roll	8	10-13	Davy Russell	Gordon Elliott	Gigginstown House Stud	10/1	9m 40.1s
2019	Tiger Roll	9	11-05	Davy Russell	Gordon Elliott	Gigginstown House Stud	4/1 F	9m 1.0s
2020	Cancelled due to the COVID-19 pandemic							
2021	Minella Times	8	10-03	Rachael Blackmore	Henry de Bromhead	J. P. McManus	11/1	9m 16.42s
2022	Noble Yeats	7	10-10	Mr Sam Waley-Cohen	Emmet Mullins	Robert Waley-Cohen	50/1	9m 3.06s
2023	Corach Rambler	9	10-05	Derek Fox	Lucinda Russell	The Ramblers	8/1 F	9m 12.06s
2024	I Am Maximus	8	11-06	Paul Townend	Willie Mullins	J. P. McManus	7/1 JF	9m 24s
2025	Nick Rockett	8	11-08	Mr Patrick Mullins	Willie Mullins	Steward and Sadie Andrew	33/1	9m 06.14s
2026	I Am Maximus	10	11-12	Paul Townend	Willie Mullins	J. P. McManus	9/2 F	9m 09.68s

^{a} The 1843 winner Vanguard was trained at Lord Chesterfield's private stables at Bretby Hall.
