= 1918 War Steeplechase =

Substitute race for Grand National race

- War Steeplechase
- Location: Gatwick Racecourse
- Date: 21 March 1918
- Winning horse: Poethlyn
- Jockey: Ernest Piggott
- Trainer: Harry Escott
- Owner: Gwladys Peel

The 1918 Grand National was cancelled because Aintree Racecourse had been taken over by the War Office. However, a substitute race known as the War Steeplechase was held at Gatwick Racecourse. The Gatwick races held from 1916 to 1918 are typically omitted from the true Grand National records.

The race was won by Poethlyn, ridden by jockey Ernest Piggott and trained by Harry Escott.

== Finishing order ==
Position	Name	Jockey	Age	Handicap (st-lb)	SP	Distance
01	Poethlyn	Ernest Piggott	8	11-6	5/1	
02	Captain Dreyfus	John Reardon	?	12-7	20/1	
03	Ballymacad	Ivor Anthony	?	11-3	7/1	
04	Berneray	George Avila	?	10-4	100/7	
?	Top Hole	Charles Hawkins	?	11-2	50/1	
?	Clear Money	Mr Pepper	5	11-2	100/1	
?	Shaun Spadah	A Stubbs	7	10-11	10/1	
?	Queen Imaal	Alfred Newey	?	10-7	50/1	
?	Sergeant Murphy	Spink Walkington	8	10-7	40/1	
?	Mark Back	Herbert Smyth	?	10-7	40/1	
?	Chang	O J Casebourne	8	10-2	100/8	
?	Simon The Lepper	Roger 'Tiny' Burford	?	10-0	50/1	
?	Awbeg	L Jones	?	10-0	100/1	
?	Charlbury	Joe Dillon	10	9-10	33/1	

== Non-finishers ==
Fence	Name	Jockey	Age	Handicap (st-lb)	SP	Fate
?	Ally Sloper	John Walsh	9	11-9	5/1	Fell
?	Wavertree	Edmund Driscoll	8	10-12	5/1	Fell
?	Vermouth	Jack Anthony	8	11-13	100/8	
