= Shaun Spadah =

Grand National winning racehorse

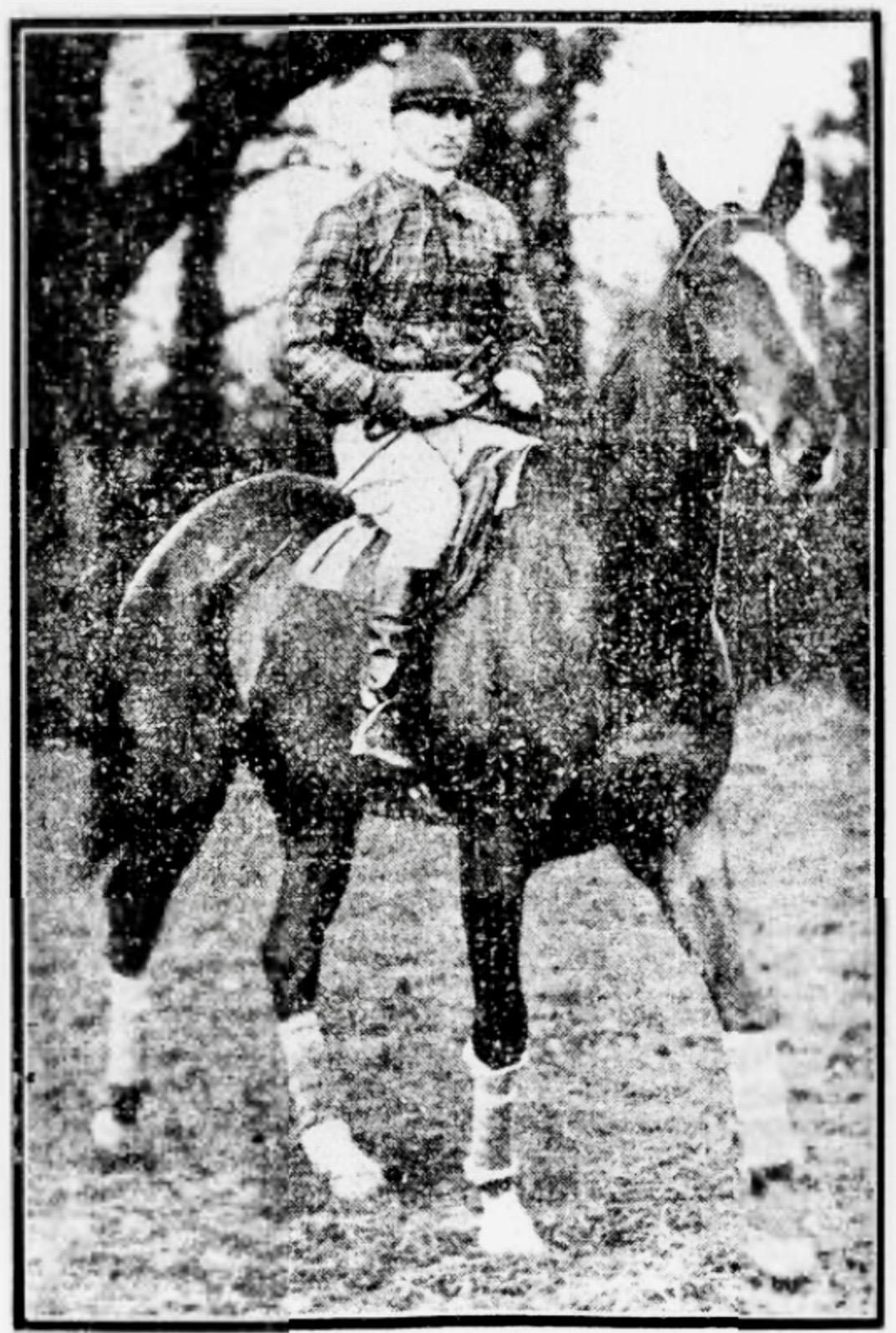
- Shaun Spadah with jockey Dick Rees
- Sire: Easter Prize
- Dam: Rusialka
- Damsire: Bushey Park
- Sex: Gelding
- Foaled: 1911
- Country: (Republic of Ireland) Ireland
- Colour: Bay
- Breeder: Patrick McKenna
- Owner: Malcolm McAlpine
- Trainer: George Poole

Major wins
- Grand National (1921)

Shaun Spadah (1911–1940) was an Irish-bred, English-trained racehorse who won the 1921 Grand National at Aintree.

== Background ==
Shaun Spadah was a Bay-coloured Gelding foaled in 1911 By horse breeder Patrick McKenna at Streamstown, County Westmeath, Ireland.

McKenna, an aspiring politician, acquired his first brood mare from breeder Michael Cleary in 1909, a horse named Rusialka. Cleary reportedly remarked to McKenna at the time that; "Maybe you'll breed a Grand National winner from her." Cleary's brother, Richard, a trainer, provided the successful Irish National Hunt steeplechaser Easter Prize as a sire the following year. The result, early in 1911, was Shaun Spadah.

McKenna wanted to give his foal an Irish Gaelic name, settling on Shaun Spadah, a character named in a poem by Reverend W. McCormack, a Catholic priest and academic from County Meath. The name translates into "John the Bogman".

In his formative years, Shaun Spadah became dangerously ill by eating the seeds of a poisonous weed, but was nursed back to health by McKenna's children, making a full recovery. In doing so they trained the horse to eat raw eggs, giving him up to a dozen a day, simply for the joy of hearing the shells crunch.

Shaun Spadah was sold as a two-year-old to Richard Cleary who trained the horse for his first race on the flat at The Curragh the following year. He was then sent to Jack Anthony to be trained for fencing. However, not show sufficient early promise, he was returned to his owner and put to grass. Cleary subsequently used Shaun Spadah as a hunter, racing in point-to-point, before selling the horse to Mr P Rogers aged around four-years.

It was Rogers who sent Shaun Spadah to England, initially to be trained by George Hyams at Epsom in Surrey. Rogers sold him on to Malcolm McAlpine who restabled the horse in Lewes with George Poole in 1920. It would be with Poole that Shaun Spadah would find greatest success.

== Racing career ==
Shaun Spadah was an 'Aintree horse', a steady but consistent fencer that benefitted from the attrition rate that the long and arduous Grand National tended to inflict on its large field. Shaun Spadah's first entry (of sorts) came in 1918 for the last of the substitute 'War Nationals' held at Gatwick. Under the mount of A Stubbs, the seven-year-old finished the course but was unplaced. Still under the guidance of Hyams, Shaun Spadah ran the Grand National for the first time proper in 1919, when the Grand National returned to Aintree. He finished 5th under the mount of Richard Morgan.

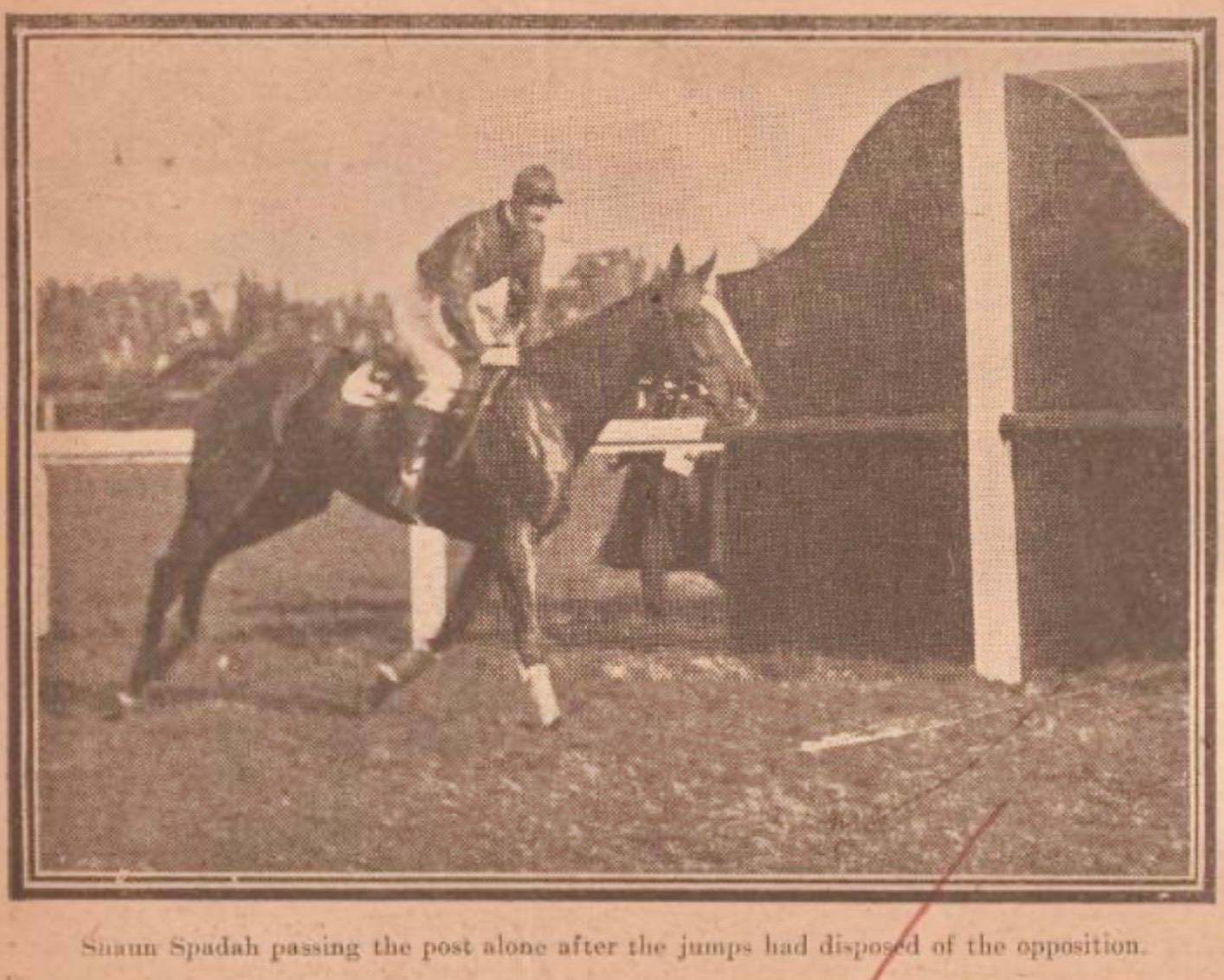
Shaun Spadah wins the 1921 Grand National

Shaun Spadah did not race in the 1920 Grand National following his transfer to George Poole's Lewes stable. However, a year later, Shaun Spadah scored his single most famous victory in the 1921 Grand National, priced at 100/9. On 18 March 1921, in the presence of King George V and Queen Mary, Shaun Spadah was the only horse from the 35 starters who would not unseat his mount, Dick Rees over the four-and-a-half-mile Aintree course. In a tumultuous race, only six riders made it safely around the first circuit of the Aintree course. More would fall on the second. Eventually, only Shaun Spadah and The Bore remained in contention. At the penultimate fence The Bore dismounted his jockey Harry Brown, leaving Rees free to bring Shaun Spadah home in comfort, scoring victory by a distance. Rees was the only jockey to bring his horse home without having to remount, though four others did so in order to finish - The Bore, All White and Turkey Buzzard.

The 1921 running would be the first of four straight Grand National mounts that Dick Rees rode on Shaun Spadah. While his only victory came in that first race, Shaun Spadah and Rees would place second in the 1923 Grand National, and seventh in 1924. Across six separate entries, Shaun Spadah would only fail to complete the course at Aintree in 1922.

To celebrate the victory, Poole gave a shilling to every schoolchild in Lewes, some 1,300 pupils. Rees meanwhile is said to have received all of the £7,000 prize money awarded to owner Malcolm McAlpine for the victory.

== Retirement and death ==
Retired following the 1924 Grand National, Shaun Spadah was used regularly as a hack by Poole at the stables where he had been trained for Grand National victory. In his retirement Shaun Spadah was also visited regularly by his 1921-winning jockey, Dick Rees, who also settled in the town that was home to his retained stable. Shaun Spadah died on 16 March 1940, aged 29, and was buried in the paddock at Lewes racecourse. When Rees died in 1951, his ashes were sprinkled on Shaun Spadah's grave.
