= 1920 Grand National =

English steeplechase horse race

- Grand National
- Location: Aintree
- Date: 26 March 1920
- Winning horse: (Republic of Ireland) Troytown
- Starting price: 6/1
- Jockey: (Wales) Mr Jack Anthony
- Trainer: (Republic of Ireland) Algy Anthony
- Owner: Thomas Collins-Gerrard
- Conditions: Heavy

The 1920 Grand National was the 79th renewal of the Grand National horse race that took place at Aintree Racecourse near Liverpool, England, on 26 March 1920.

The race, which was run in heavy rain and attended by King George V, was won by the Irish horse Troytown by twelve lengths. Poethlyn, the winner of the race the two previous years, started as the favourite but fell at the first fence.

== Finishing Order ==
| Position | Name | Jockey | Age | Handicap (st-lb) | SP | Distance |
|---|---|---|---|---|---|---|
| 01 | Troytown | Jack Anthony | 7 | 11-9 | 6/1 | 12 lengths |
| 02 | The Turk II | Roger Burford | 10 | 9-7 | 66/1 | 6 lengths |
| 03 | The Bore | Harry Brown | 9 | 10-1 | 28/1 | |
| 04 | Sergeant Murphy | Willie Smith | 10 | 10-0 | 100/7 | |
| 05 Remounted Fell 26th | Neurotic | Dick Rees | 9 | 9-13 | 28/1 | |

== Non-finishers ==
| Fence | Name | Jockey | Age | Handicap (st-lb) | SP | Fate |
|---|---|---|---|---|---|---|
| 01 | Poethyln | Ernest Piggott | 10 | 12-7 | 3/1 F | Fell |
| 02 | Gerald L | Frank Dainty | 6 | 9-7 | 10/1 | Fell |
| ? | General Saxham | Peter Roberts | 7 | 9-7 | ? | Fell |
| ? | Silver Ring | George Duller | 8 | 11-4 | 100/7 | Fell |
| ? | Ballyboggan | Cecil Brabazon | 9 | 11-3 | 100/7 | Fell |
| ? | Wavertree | Charles Kelly | 9 | 10-13 | 40/1 | Fell |
| ? | Clonree | E R Morgan | 6 | 10-10 | 25/1 | Fell |
| ? | Turkey Buzzard | William Payne | 7 | 10-7 | 100/7 | Fell |
| ? | Ardonagh | Percy Whitaker | 7 | 10-6 | ? | Fell |
| ? | Picture Saint | Tuppy Bennet | 8 | 10-0 | ? | Fell |
| ? | All White | Robert Chadwick | 6 | 9-10 | 33/1 | Fell |
| ? | Wavebeam | A Aylin | 9 | 9-7 | ? | Fell |
| ? | Irish Dragoon | Tony Escott | 6 | 9-7 | ? | Fell |
| ? | Dunadry | Spink Walkington | 7 | 9-7 | ? | Fell |
| ? | Bonny Charlie | Mr MC Blair | 1 | 9-7 | ? | Fell |
| ? | Little Rover | Captain Doyle | 14 | 9-7 | ? | Fell |
| ? | Lucy Glitter's III | Lewis Rees | 8 | 9-7 | ? | Fell |
| ? | Square Up | T Wilmot | 7 | 9-7 | ? | Fell |
| ? | Loch Allen | Tom Hulme | 9 | 9-12 | 33/1 | |
