= Red Splash =

British racehorse

- Sire: Copper Ore
- Grandsire: Forfarshire
- Dam: La Manche
- Damsire: Wavelet's Pride
- Sex: Gelding
- Foaled: May 1919
- Country: United Kingdom
- Colour: Chestnut
- Owner: Humphrey Wyndham
- Trainer: Fred Withington
- Record: 5 wins

Major wins
- Cheltenham Gold Cup (1924)

Red Splash (foaled May 1919) was a British racehorse who won the inaugural Cheltenham Gold Cup.

== Background ==
Red Splash was a chestnut gelding with a white blaze and two white socks bred in England. He was not technically a Thoroughbred as his sire Copper Ore was descended from a mare of unknown pedigree. Red Splash's dam La Manche was a descendant of the influential Irish broodmare The Beauty.

During his racing career, Red Splash was owned by Major Humphrey Wyndham and was trained by Fred Withington at Fritwell in Oxfordshire. Withington was best known for training Rubio and Mattie MacGregor to finish first and second in the 1908 Grand National.

== Racing career ==
Red Splash showed early promise as a steeplechaser and won four times over fences in the 1923/1924 National Hunt season including a race at Cheltenham Racecourse in November. In the spring, he was entered in the inaugural Cheltenham Gold Cup in which, as a five-year-old, he carried nine pounds fewer than his older opponents. Withington had reservations about running the horse in the race as Red Splash had sustained an injury which interrupted his preparation. The likely favourite, Alcazar, was withdrawn on the morning of the race, and his jockey, Dick Rees, was engaged to take the ride on Red Splash. The five-year-old started at odds of 5/1 in a nine-runner field with his biggest rivals looking to be Forewarned, Gerald L, and Conjuror (third in the 1923 Grand National). After leading in the early stages, Red Splash dropped back but recovered to regain the lead at the second-last fence. The final stages saw a sustained three-way struggle as Red Splash fought off strong challenges from Conjuror and Gerald L to prevail by a head and a neck.

Following his victory at Cheltenham, Red Splash was highly regarded, being described as showing "marked dash in leaping his fences" and likely to become a leading Grand National contender.

In the following season, Red Splash suffered from injuries and training problems. He was off the racecourse for ten months before being well beaten in a minor event at Leicester Racecourse in January 1925. Plans to run in the Champion Chase at Aintree Racecourse in April came to nothing, and he never contested another major race.

== Assessment and honours ==
In their book A Century of Champions, based on the Timeform rating system, John Randall and Tony Morris rated Red Splash a "poor" Gold Cup winner.

== Pedigree ==
Pedigree of Red Splash (GB), chestnut gelding, 1919
Sire Copper Ore (GB) 1905	Forfarshire (GB); 1897	Royal Hampton	Hampton
Sire Copper Ore (GB) 1905	Forfarshire (GB); 1897	Royal Hampton	Princess
Sire Copper Ore (GB) 1905	Forfarshire (GB); 1897	St Elizabeth	St Simon
Sire Copper Ore (GB) 1905	Forfarshire (GB); 1897	St Elizabeth	Esa
Sire Copper Ore (GB) 1905	Sybil d'Or	Soleil d'Or	Bend Or
Sire Copper Ore (GB) 1905	Sybil d'Or	Soleil d'Or	Fair Vestal
Sire Copper Ore (GB) 1905	Sybil d'Or	Civility	Highborn
Sire Copper Ore (GB) 1905	Sybil d'Or	Civility	Courtesy
Dam La Manche (IRE) 1909	Wavelet's Pride (GB); 1897	Fernandez	Sterling
Dam La Manche (IRE) 1909	Wavelet's Pride (GB); 1897	Fernandez	Isola Bella
Dam La Manche (IRE) 1909	Wavelet's Pride (GB); 1897	Wavelet	Paul Jones
Dam La Manche (IRE) 1909	Wavelet's Pride (GB); 1897	Wavelet	Wanda
Dam La Manche (IRE) 1909	Queen of France (IRE); 1900	Buckingham	Galopin
Dam La Manche (IRE) 1909	Queen of France (IRE); 1900	Buckingham	Lady Yardley
Dam La Manche (IRE) 1909	Queen of France (IRE); 1900	Queen of Brilliants	Favo
Dam La Manche (IRE) 1909	Queen of France (IRE); 1900	Queen of Brilliants	The Beauty (Family 11-d)
