= Racecourse Association Steeple Chase =

- 1916 Racecourse Association Steeple Chase
- Location: Gatwick Racecourse
- Date: 24 March 1916
- Winning horse: Vermouth
- Jockey: Jack Reardon
- Trainer: James Bell
- Owner: P. F. Heybourne

The 1916 Grand National was cancelled because Aintree Racecourse was taken over by the War Office. However, a substitute race known as the Racecourse Association Steeple Chase was held at Gatwick Racecourse. The Gatwick races from 1916 to 1918 are not typically included in the true Grand National record books.

The race was won by Vermouth, ridden by jockey Jack Reardon and trained by James Bell.

== Finishing Order ==
Position	Name	Jockey	Age	Handicap (st-lb)	SP	Distance
01	Vermouth	Jack Reardon	6	11-10	100/8	
02	Irish Mail	Charles Hawkins	9	12-05	20/1	
03	Schoolmoney	A Saxby	6	10-02	33/1	
04	Jacobus	Alf Newey	11	12-00	100/6	
?	Couvrefeu II	Frank Dainty	12	12-07	40/1	
?	Ally Sloper	Jack Anthony	7	11-13	9/2	
?	Lord Marcus	Georges Parfrement	8	11-13	11/2	
?	Munster Vale	G Calder	6	11-00	40/1	
?	Hackler's Bey	Herbert Harrison	9	11-00	100/8	
?	Thowl Pin	Charles Kelly	11	10-12	8/1	
?	Denis Auburn	Edmund Driscoll	9	10-07	8/1	
?	Ballyneety	Bill Smith	?	09-07	50/1	

== Non-finishers ==
Fence	Name	Jockey	Age	Handicap (st-lb)	SP	Fate
?	Eugenist	Herbert Smyth	?	11-10	100/6	Pulled Up
?	Lamentable	Spike Walkington	?	11-1	25/1	Pulled Up
?	Strangeways	Tom Dunn	?	10-4	?	Pulled Up
?	Lynch Pin	Joe Dillon	?	1-0	?	Pulled Up
?	Hersperus Magnus	J East	?	9-10	?	Pulled Up
?	Drumlane	John Kelly	?	9-10	?	Pulled Up
?	Fleur-De-Lys	W Hives	?	9-7	?	Pulled Up
?	Bligh	B Roberts	?	9-7	?	Pulled Up
?	Stag's Head	Willie Smith	?	9-7	20/1	Fell
