= 1919 Grand National =

English steeplechase horse race

- Grand National
- Location: Aintree
- Date: 28 March 1919
- Winning horse: Poethlyn
- Starting price: 11/4 F
- Jockey: (England) Ernest Piggott
- Trainer: Harry Escott
- Owner: Gwladys Peel
- Conditions: Good to soft

The 1919 Grand National was the 78th renewal of the Grand National horse race that took place at Aintree Racecourse near Liverpool, England, on 28 March 1919.

It was the first true Aintree Grand National since 1915, with the intermittent races being cancelled due to World War I and substituted by a "Racecourse Association Steeplechase" and later a "War National Steeplechase" at Gatwick Racecourse.

The 1919 National was won by the Poethlyn, ridden by Ernest Piggott. The pair had won an unofficial National at Gatwick in 1918 and on the back of this started 11/4 favourites, the shortest starting odds of any Grand National winner to date.

== Finishing order ==
Position	Name	Jockey	Age	Handicap (st-lb)	SP	Distance
01	Poethlyn	Ernest Piggott	9	12-7	11/4 Fav	8 Lengths
02	Ballyboggan	W Head	8	11-10	9/1	
03	Pollen	Tony Escott	10	11-4	100/7	
04	Loch Allen	John Kelly	8	10-0	33/1	
?	Pay Only	Tom Hulme	9	11-4	100/7	
?	Abou Ben Adhem	A Stubbs	8	12-0	100/1	
?	Ally Sloper	Ivor Anthony	10	11-3	100/1	
?	Shaun Spadah	Richard Morgan	8	11-2	33/1	
?	Vermouth	Georges Parfrement	9	10-12	20/1	
?	Sergeant Murphy	Spink Walkington	9	10-7	25/1	
?	All White	T Williams	5	9-10	66/1	
?	Fargue	Willie Smith	9	9-9	50/1	
?	Chang	John Reardon	9	9-8	50/1	

== Non-finishers ==
Fence	Name	Jockey	Age	Handicap (st-lb)	SP	Fate
?	Irish Dragoon	Henry Bletsoe	5	9-8	100/1	Pulled Up
?	Rubinstein	William Payne	12	11-0	50/1	Fell
?	Picture Saint	F McCabe	7	10-0	100/1	Fell
?	Ballincarroona	Ian Straker	11	9-13	20/1	Fell
?	Schoolmoney	Frank Cullen	10	9-10	33/1	Fell
?	Sunloch	Edmund Driscoll	13	9-10	25/1	Pulled Up
?	The Turk II	Peter Roberts	9	9-7	100/1	Fell
?	Charlbury	Percy Woodland	11	9-7	7/1	Pulled Up
?	Svetoi	A Saxby	9	9-7	40/1	Fell
