= 1927 Grand National =

English steeplechase horse race

- Grand National
- Location: Aintree Racecourse
- Date: 25 March 1927
- Winning horse: Sprig
- Starting price: 8/1 F
- Jockey: Ted Leader
- Trainer: Tom Leader
- Owner: Mrs Mary Partridge
- Conditions: Soft (heavy in places)

External videos
- Silent highlights of the 1927 Grand National (British Pathé)

The 1927 Grand National was the 86th renewal of the Grand National horse race that took place at Aintree near Liverpool, England, on 25 March 1927.

The race was won by Sprig, the 8/1 favourite ridden by jockey Ted Leader. Leader's father, Tom, trained the winner. It was Sprig's third attempt at winning the National – his owner, Mary Partridge, having kept him in training in memory of her son who died in World War I.

At Becher's Brook on the first circuit, Marsin and Lissett III fell and Silver Somme – a popular fancy – refused. Bovril III, a 100/1 outsider, finished in second place by one length, with Bright's Boy another length behind in third.

This was the first National to be covered on BBC Radio.

== Finishing order ==
Position	Name	Jockey	Age	Handicap (st-lb)	SP	Distance
01	Sprig	Ted Leader	10	12-4	8/1	1 Length
02	Bovril III	Mr William Pennington	9	10-12	100/1	
03	Bright's Boy	Jack Anthony	8	12-7	100/7	
04	Drinmond	Barney Balding	10	10-13	66/1	
05	Master of Arts	Major Cavenagh	10	10-10	50/1	
06	White Park	Eric Foster	8	12-5	20/1	
07	Ballystockart	Captain Reginald Sassoon	8	11-1	100/1	

== Non-finishers ==
Fence	Name	Jockey	Age	Handicap (st-lb)	SP	Fate
?	Gerald L	Lewis Rees	13	12-5	50/1	?
?	Amberwave	Mr J O'Brien	9	12-0	20/1	Balked
?	Grecian Wave	J Meaney	9	11-12	50/1	Fell
6	Marsin	Pat Powell	9	11-12	66/1	Fell
?	Thrown In	Hugh Grosvenor	11	11-10	100/8	Fell
?	Knight of the Wilderness	Bill Gurney	7	11-9	33/1	Fell
?	Dwarf of the Forest	Mr Harry Kennard	10	11-4	33/1	Fell
?	Shaun Or	W Madden	8	11-3	100/6	Fell
6	Silver Somme	M Connors	10	11-3	100/7	Refused
?	Keep Cool	Jack Goswell	12	11-3	33/1	Fell
16	Red Bee	Bill Payne	?	?	50/1	Fell
?	Hawker	Captain A E Grant	13	11-1	66/1	Ran Out
16	Test Match	Bob Lyall	9	11-1	50/1	Fell
?	Uncle Jack	T O'Sullivan	8	11-1	50/1	Fell
?	Trump Card	Mr Stratford Dennis	9	11-1	33/1	Fell
?	Master Billie	Dick Rees	8	10-13	20/1	Fell
?	Pop Ahead	Harold Fowler	9	10-13	40/1	Fell
?	Misconduct	Billy Parvin	8	10-12	20/1	Fell
?	Sir Huon	Monty Rayson	13	10-12	100/1	Fell
?	Cash Box	G Green	10	10-12	100/1	Fell
?	Snapper	Captain Meade Dennis	9	10-10	40/1	Fell
?	Upton Lad	Mr Bill Dutton	12	10-10	66/1	Fell
?	Eagle's Tail	Fred Brookes	8	10-9	20/1	Pulled Up
?	Grakle	John Moloney	5	10-9	9/1	Fell
?	Mr Jolly	Mr J S Wight	12	10-9	66/1	Fell
?	Corazon	Tommy Morgan	9	10-8	100/1	Fell
6	Lissett III	Tim Hamey	11	10-5	100/1	Fell
?	All White	James F Mason	13	10-5	100/1	Pulled Up
?	Blaenor	Paddy Doyle	10	10-5	33/1	Fell
?	Miss Balcadden	Mr D Thomas	8	10-5	100/1	Fell
