= 1899 Grand National =

English steeplechase horse race

- Grand National
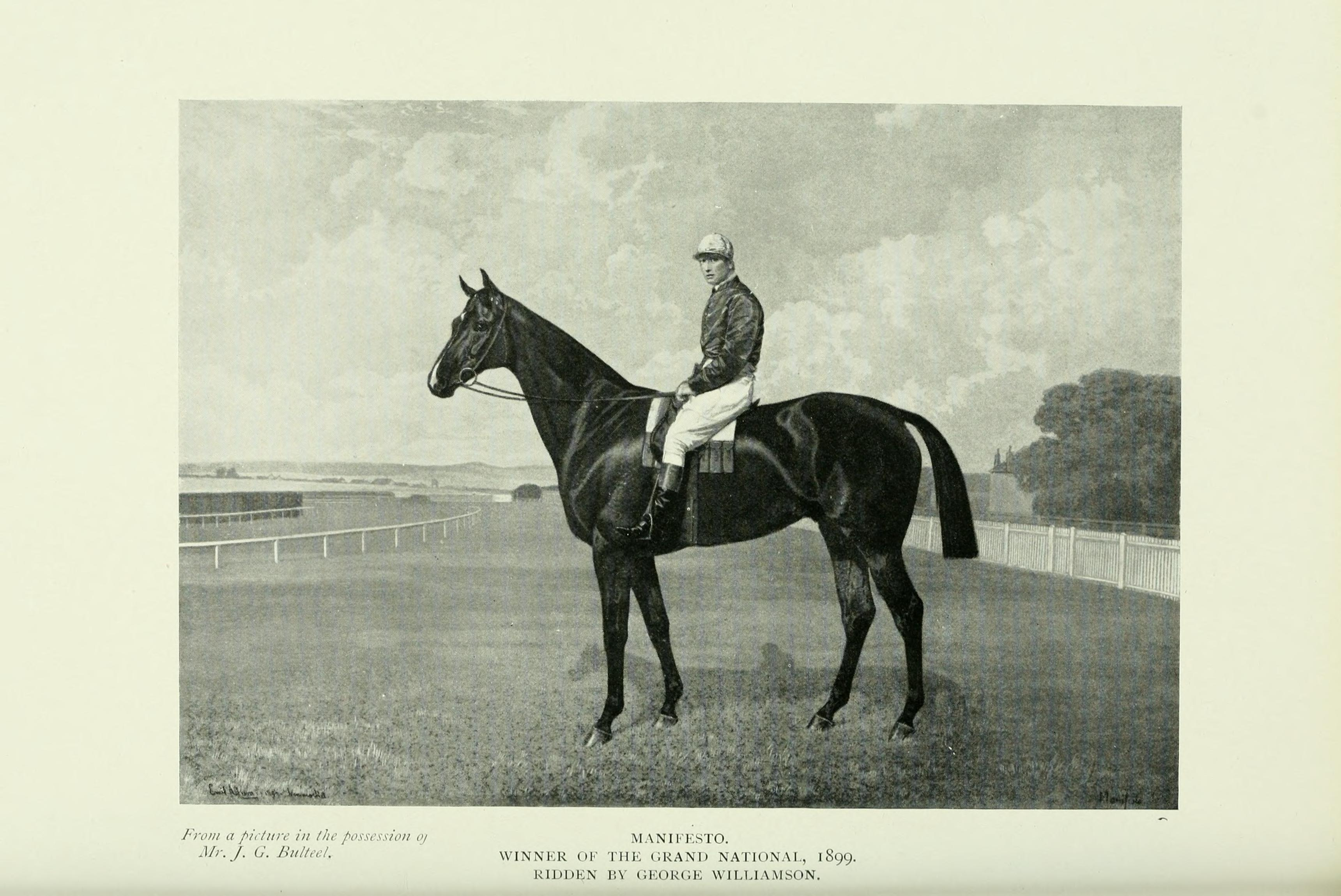
- Manifesto (from Heroes and heroines of the Grand National)
- Location: Aintree
- Date: 24 March 1899
- Winning horse: Manifesto
- Starting price: 5/1
- Jockey: George Williamson
- Trainer: Willie Moore
- Owner: John Bulteel
- Conditions: Good

The 1899 Grand National was the 61st renewal of the Grand National horse race that took place at Aintree near Liverpool, England, on 24 March 1899.

== Finishing Order ==
Position	Name	Jockey	Age	Handicap (st-lb)	SP	Distance
01	Manifesto	George Williamson	11	12-7	5/1	5 lengths
02	Ford of Fyne	E Matthews	?	10-10	40/1	
03	Elliman	Ernest Piggott	?	10-1	20/1	
04	Dead Level	Frank Mason	?	10-6	33/1	
05	Barsac	Mr Harry Ripley	?	9-12	25/1	
06	Whiteboy II	Albert Banner	?	9-10	200/1	
07	Ambush II	Algy Anthony	?	10-2	100/12	
08	Electric Spark	A Waddington	?	9-11	20/1	
09	Mum	Willam Hoysted	?	10-5	100/1	
10	Fairy Queen	Oates	?	9-11	100/1	
11	Corner	David Read	?	9-7	200/1	Last to complete

== Non-finishers ==
Fence	Name	Jockey	Age	Handicap (st-lb)	SP	Fate
09	Gentle Ida	William Taylor	?	11-7	4/1	Fell
30	Xebee	Mr Arthur Wood	?	11-4	33/1	Fell
02	The Sapper	Mr Gwyn Davies	?	10-11	10/1	Fell
26	Trade Mark	James Knox	?	10-2	25/1	Pulled Up
15	Pistache	Count de Geloes	?	9-13	100/1	Fell
14	Lotus Lily	W Latham	?	9-12	100/8	Fell
26	Sheriff Hutton	Charles Hogan	?	9-10	100/7	Pulled Up
14	Little Norton	C Clack	?	9-7	200/1	Fell
