= British Champion Jockey =

British Champion Jockey could refer to:

- British flat racing Champion Jockey
- British jump racing Champion Jockey
