= 1915 Grand National =

English steeplechase horse race

- Grand National
- Location: Aintree
- Date: 26 March 1915
- Winning horse: Ally Sloper
- Starting price: 100/8
- Jockey: (Wales) Jack Anthony
- Trainer: Aubrey Hastings
- Owner: Lady Nelson
- Conditions: Good

The 1915 Grand National was the 77th renewal of the Grand National horse race that took place at Aintree near Liverpool, England, on 26 March 1915. Lady Nelson became the first female owner to win the Grand National.

== Finishing Order ==
Position	Name	Jockey	Age	Handicap (st-lb)	SP	Distance
01	Ally Sloper	Jack Anthony	6	10-5	100/8	2 Lengths
02	Jacobus	Alfred Newey	8	11-0	25/1	
03	Father Confessor	A Aylin	6	9-10	10/1	
04	Alfred Noble	Tom Hulme	10	10-12	25/1	
?	Balscadden	Frank Lyall	8	11-8	10/1	
?	Thowl Pin	Bill Smith	10	10-8	33/1	
?	Blow Pipe	Willie Smith	10	10-4	?	
?	Hacker's Bey	Herbert Harrison	8	10-0	40/1	
?	Silver Top	Spike Walkington	8	10-0	9/1	

== Non-finishers ==
Fence	Name	Jockey	Age	Handicap (st-lb)	SP	Fate
?	Irish Mail	Leslie Brabazon	8	11-12	6/1	Pulled Up
?	Bullawarra	Charles Hawkins	10	11-12	100/7	Fell
?	Ballyhackle	George Stanley Avila	12	11-9	?	Brought Down
?	Ilston	Ivor Anthony	7	11-8	33/1	Fell
?	Distaff	Ernest Piggott	7	10-10	25/1	Pulled Up
?	Lord Marcus	Georges Parfrement	7	10-3	7/1	Fell
?	The Babe	Bob Chadwick	7	10-0	?	Pulled Up
?	St Mathurin II	Tom Dunn	10	9-10	?	Fell
?	Denis Auburn	Jack Reardon	8	9-7	33/1	Fell
?	Bachelor's Fight	H Harty	8	9-7	100/9	Fell
?	Bahadur	Peter Roberts	8	9-7	?	Fell
