= 1917 War Steeplechase =

- War Steeplechase
- Location: Gatwick Racecourse
- Date: 21 March 1917
- Winning horse: Ballymacad
- Jockey: Edmund Driscoll
- Trainer: Aubrey Hastings
- Owner: Sir George Bullough

The 1917 Grand National was cancelled because Aintree Racecourse had been taken over by the War Office. However, a substitute race known as the War Steeplechase was held at Gatwick Racecourse. The Gatwick races held from 1916 to 1918 are typically excluded from official Grand National records.

The 1917 War Steeplechase was won by Ballymacad, ridden by jockey Edmund Driscoll and trained by Aubrey Hastings.

Limerock, ridden by Bill Smith, was clear on the run-in but collapsed yards from the winning post, in a manner similar to Devon Loch in 1956.

== Finishing order ==
Position	Name	Jockey	Age	Handicap (st-lb)	SP	Distance
01	Ballymacad	Edmund Driscoll	?	9-12	100/9	
02	Chang	Willie Smith	7	9-9	11/2	
03	Ally Sloper	Ivor Anthony	8	11-10	20/1	
04	Vermouth	John Reardon	7	12-3	100/12	
?	Father Confessor	A Aylin	8	11-7	?	
?	Queen Imaal	Alfred Newey	?	11-3	25/1	
?	Yellow Chat	Georges Parfrement	6	11-0	100/12	
?	Blow Pipe	Edward Lancaster	12	10-0	?	

== Non-finishers ==
Fence	Name	Jockey	Age	Handicap (st-lb)	SP	Fate
?	Templedowney	Tom Hulme	?	12-7	25/1	Fell
?	Irish Mail	Ernest Piggott	10	12-4	25/1	Pulled Up
?	Carrig Park	Charles Hawkins	?	11-6	7/2	Fell
Run-In	Limerock	Bill Smith	?	11-5	100/7	Fell
?	Hackler's Bey	Captain D Rogers	10	10-10	?	Fell
?	Kenia	A Saxby	?	10-10	33/1	Fell
?	Thowl Pin	Charles Kelly	12	10-7	?	?
?	Charlbury	Joe Dillon	9	10-6	?	Pulled Up
?	Denis Auburn	Roger Burford	10	10-4	?	Pulled Up
?	Fargue	Harry Brown	7	9-7	25/1	Fell
?	Grithorpe	Herbert Smyth	?	9-7	?	Fell
