= 1917 in sports =

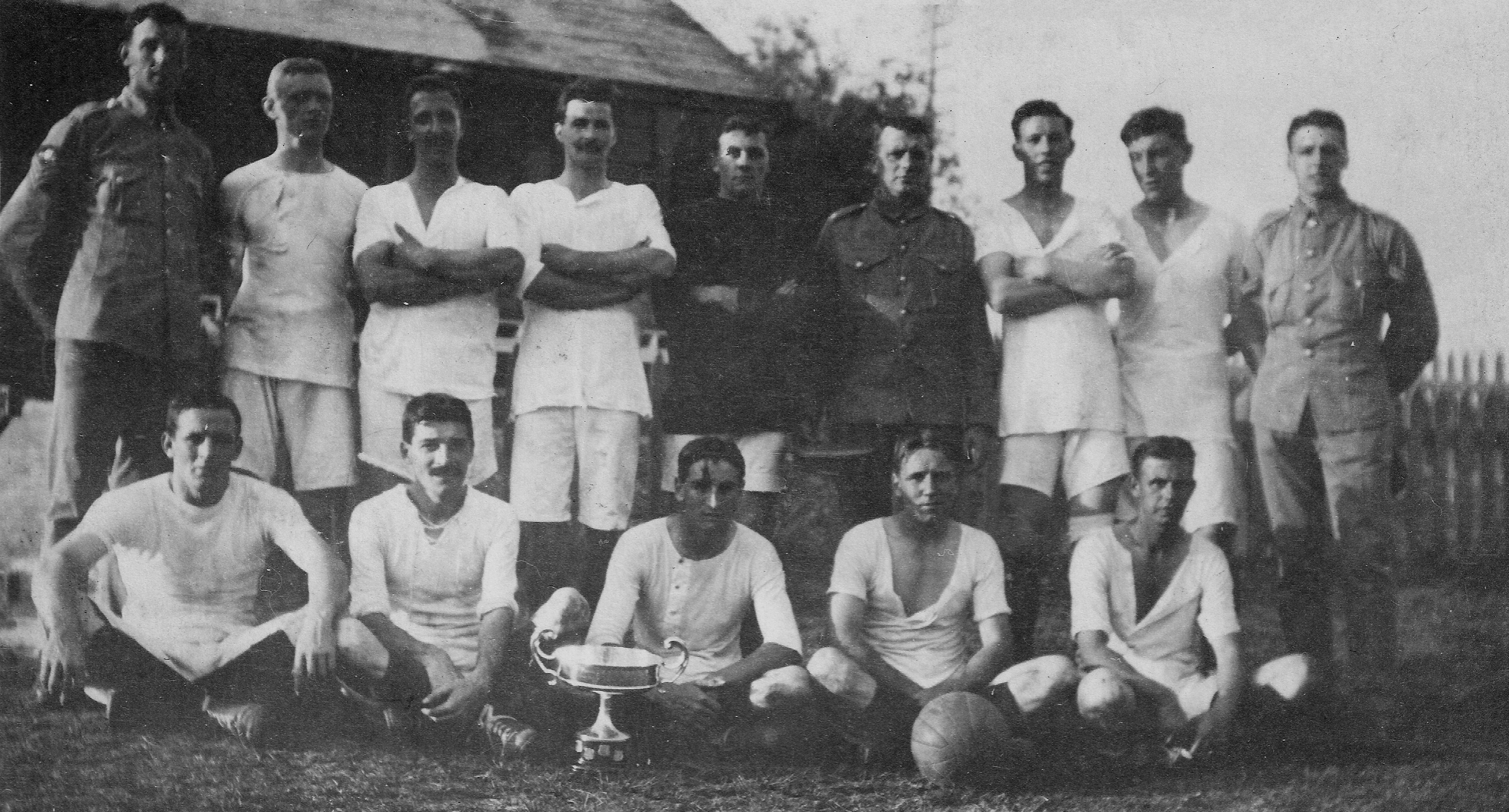
The football team of 95 Company, Royal Garrison Artillery, victors in the 1917 Governor's Cup football match, pose with the cup.

Note — many sporting events did not take place because of World War I

1917 in sports describes the year's events in world sport.

== American football ==
College championship

- College football national championship – Georgia Tech Yellow Jackets (coached by John Heisman)
- Camp Randall Stadium, home of the Wisconsin Badgers, opens

== Association football ==
Europe

- There is no major football in Europe due to World War I

Norway

- Foundation of Rosenborg BK at Trondheim

== Australian rules football ==
VFL Premiership:

- Collingwood wins the 21st VFL Premiership: Collingwood 9.20 (74) d Fitzroy 5.9 (39) at Melbourne Cricket Ground (MCG)

South Australian Football League:

- not contested due to World War I

West Australian Football League:

- 15 September: South Fremantle 6.5 (41) defeats East Fremantle 3.8 (26) for their second consecutive WAFL premiership.

== Bandy ==
Sweden

- Championship final – IFK Uppsala 11–2 AIK

== Baseball ==
World Series

- 6–15 October — The Chicago White Sox (AL) defeat the New York Giants (NL) to win the 1917 World Series by 4 games to 2.

== Boxing ==
Events

- Ted "Kid" Lewis regains the World Welterweight Championship and holds it until 1919.
- Al McCoy loses the World Middleweight Championship title to Mike O'Dowd, who knocks him out in the 6th round at Brooklyn
- Benny Leonard, widely regarded as the greatest-ever lightweight, defeats Freddie Welsh at New York to win the World Lightweight Championship, which he holds until he retires in 1925
- Another great champion, Pete Herman defeats Kid Williams over 20 rounds at New Orleans to take the World Bantamweight Championship, which he holds until 1920

Lineal world champions

- World Heavyweight Championship – Jess Willard
- World Light Heavyweight Championship – Battling Levinsky
- World Middleweight Championship – Al McCoy → Mike O'Dowd
- World Welterweight Championship – Jack Britton → Ted "Kid" Lewis
- World Lightweight Championship – Freddie Welsh → Benny Leonard
- World Featherweight Championship – Johnny Kilbane
- World Bantamweight Championship – Kid Williams → Pete Herman
- World Flyweight Championship – Jimmy Wilde

== Canadian football ==
Grey Cup

- not contested due to World War I

== Cricket ==
Events

- There is no first-class cricket in England, Australia, New Zealand, South Africa or the West Indies due to World War I

India

- Bombay Quadrangular – Europeans shared with Parsees

== Cycling ==
Tour de France

- not contested due to World War I

Giro d'Italia

- not contested due to World War I

== Figure skating ==
World Figure Skating Championships

- not contested due to World War I

== Golf ==
Events

- All major championships are cancelled due to World War I

== Handball ==
- The first official handball match was played on December 2 in Berlin, Germany.

== Horse racing ==
England

- Grand National – not held due to World War I
- 1,000 Guineas Stakes – Diadem
- 2,000 Guineas Stakes – Gay Crusader
- The Derby – Gay Crusader
- The Oaks – Sunny Jane
- St. Leger Stakes – Gay Crusader

Australia

- Melbourne Cup – Westcourt

Canada

- King's Plate – Belle Mahone

Ireland

- Irish Grand National – Pay Only
- Irish Derby Stakes – First Flier

USA

- Kentucky Derby – Omar Khayyam
- Preakness Stakes – Kalitan
- Belmont Stakes – Hourless

== Ice hockey ==
Stanley Cup

- 17–26 March — Seattle Metropolitans (PCHA) defeats Montreal Canadiens (NHA) in the 1917 Stanley Cup Final by 3 games to 1

Events

- Allan Cup – Toronto Dentals
- 10 November — after Eddie Livingstone, owner of the Toronto NHA team, refuses to sell, the NHA votes to suspend operations
- 26 November — in a secret meeting, several owners of the NHA form the National Hockey League (NHL) to force out the owner of the Toronto Blueshirts NHA team. Toronto's Arena Gardens will operate a temporary franchise in Toronto while Quebec Bulldogs becomes an NHL member but is suspended for the inaugural season.
- 19 December — the opening NHL games are played to begin the new league's inaugural season

== Motor racing ==
Events

- No major races are held anywhere worldwide due to World War I

== Multi-sport events ==
Far Eastern Championship Games

- Third Far Eastern Championship Games held in Tokyo, Empire of Japan

== Rowing ==
The Boat Race

- Oxford and Cambridge Boat Race – not contested due to World War I
- International Eight Boat Race - England v Australia. Rowed Putney To Hammersmith, London, 20th Oct. 1917. Won By Australia by 3/4 length.

== Rugby league ==
England

- All first-class competitions are cancelled due to World War I

Australia

- NSW Premiership – Balmain (outright winner)

New Zealand

- 1917 New Zealand rugby league season

== Rugby union ==
Five Nations Championship

- Five Nations Championship series is not contested due to World War I

== Speed skating ==
Speed Skating World Championships

- not contested due to World War I

== Tennis ==
Australia

- Australian Men's Singles Championship – not contested due to World War I

England

- Wimbledon Men's Singles Championship – not contested due to World War I
- Wimbledon Women's Singles Championship – not contested due to World War I

France

- French Men's Singles Championship – not contested due to World War I
- French Women's Singles Championship – not contested due to World War I

USA

- American Men's Singles Championship – Lindley Murray (USA) defeats Nathaniel Niles (USA) 5–7 8–6 6–3 6–3
- American Women's Singles Championship – Molla Bjurstedt Mallory (Norway) defeats Marion Vanderhoef Morse (USA) 4–6 6–0 6–2

Davis Cup

- 1917 International Lawn Tennis Challenge – not contested
