= 1924 Grand National =

English steeplechase horse race

- Grand National
- Location: Aintree Racecourse
- Date: 28 March 1924
- Winning horse: Master Robert
- Starting price: 25/1
- Jockey: Bob Trudgill
- Trainer: Aubrey Hastings
- Owner: (Scotland) Lord Airlie
- Conditions: Good (good to firm in places)

External videos
- Silent highlights of the 1924 Grand National (British Pathé)

The 1924 Grand National was the 83rd renewal of the Grand National horse race that took place at Aintree Racecourse near Liverpool, England, on 28 March 1924.

A false start caused the race to be delayed by around eight minutes. 1924 was the last year the Grand National would be started from a general riding start, with the now-familiar 'tape' introduced at the line the following year. Winnal gained an advantage of 20 lengths by the Canal Turn on the second circuit, when he was hampered by a loose horse and refused. The race was won by Master Robert, a 25/1 shot ridden by jockey Bob Trudgill and trained by Aubrey Hastings for owner Lord Airlie, who collected the £5,000 prize for the winner. Fly Mask finished in second place, Silvo in third and Drifter fourth. Thirty horses ran and all returned safely to the stables.

Forty-five camera operators were deployed to capture the race on film, the most to have ever gone to record a sporting event at the time. Also in attendance at Aintree was King George V.

Post race celebrations took place at Liverpool's Adelphi Hotel where winning rider, Bob Trudgill treated Lord Airlie's 1,500 guests to a re-enactment of his victory by leaping a Becher's Brook made out of 20 Magnums of Champagne

== Finishing Order ==
Position	Name	Jockey	Age	Handicap (st-lb)	SP	Distance
01	Master Robert	Bob Trudgill	11	10-5	25/1	4 Lengths
02	Fly Mask	Jack Moylan	10	10-12	100/7	
03	Silvo	George Goswell jnr	8	11-12	100/7	
04	Drifter	Alfred Calder	10	10-5	40/1	
05	Sergeant Murphy	James Hogan jnr	14	11-10	100/6	
06	Wavetown	Bob Lyall	9	10-12	100/1	
07	Shaun Spadah	Dick Rees	13	12-5	100/7	
08	Ballinode	G Fitzgibbon	8	10-4	25/1	

== Non-finishers ==
Fence	Name	Jockey	Age	Handicap (st-lb)	SP	Fate
27	Old Tay Bridge	Mr H M Hartigan	10	11-13	40/1	Unseated
24	Clonsheever	Fred Brookes	9	11-2	66/1	Refused
24	Winnall	C Donnelly	7	10-11	40/1	Refused
24	Mainsail	Mr Learmouth	8	10-0	66/1	Refused
24	Eureka II	A Robson	7	11-5	100/6	Refused
23	Gerald L	Isaac Morgan	10	12-6	50/1	Pulled Up
20	Chin Chin	A Stubbs	8	11-7	25/1	Unseated
20	A Double Escape	George Smith	10	10-3	100/1	Fell
17	James Pigg	H Morris	11	10-3	100/1	Pulled up
17	Newlands	Roger Burford	10	10-0	66/1	Pulled Up
11	Gay Lochinvar	Sylvester Duffy	8	10-0	100/1	Unseated
8	All White	Michael Tighe	10	10-11	40/1	Refused
8	Libretto	W O'Neill	9	10-8	100/1	Refused
8	Taffytus	Ted Leader	11	10-6	100/12	Refused
8	Pencoed	Mr D Thomas	9	10-6	40/1	Refused
7	Auchinrossie	Eric Foster	8	10-2	25/1	Pulled Up
6	Arravale	Percy Whitaker	9	11-2	33/1	Refused
6	Conjuror II	Harry Brown	12	11-0	5/2	Fell
5	Palm Oil	Peter Roberts	8	10-0	66/1	Unseated
4	Winter Voyage	C Goswell	7	10-2	66/1	Fell
4	Music Hall	Jack Anthony	11	12-7	25/1	Pulled Up
3	Fairy Hill II	Bill Watkinson	8	10-0	33/1	Unseated
