= 1922 Grand National =

English steeplechase horse race

- Grand National
- Location: Aintree Racecourse
- Date: 24 March 1922
- Winning horse: Music Hall
- Starting price: 100/9
- Jockey: (Wales) Lewis Rees
- Trainer: (Wales) Owen Anthony
- Owner: Hugh Kershaw
- Conditions: Good

External videos
- Silent highlights of the 1922 Grand National (British Pathé)

The 1922 Grand National was the 81st renewal of the Grand National horse race that took place at Aintree Racecourse near Liverpool, England, on 24 March 1922.

After two false starts, the race was won by Music Hall at odds of 100/9. The nine-year-old was ridden by Lewis Rees and trained by Owen Anthony, for owner Hugh Kershaw, who collected the winner's prize of £5,000. The winning jockey's brother, Dick Rees, had won the race the previous year on Shaun Spadah.

Drifter finished in second place and Taffytus in third. Sergeant Murphy and A Double Escape were remounted after falling and finished fourth and fifth respectively. There were only five finishers from the field of thirty-two horses. Most did not complete the first circuit, with many having been obstructed by Sergeant Murphy in an incident at the Canal Turn.

After a second consecutive year with a small number of finishers, following the 1921 race when only four horses completed the course, The Manchester Guardian wrote that "it is often not a case of the survival of the fittest but of the survival of the luckiest", while Robin Goodfellow in the Daily Mail described it as "a fit subject for the Chamber of Horrors". The favourite, Southampton, and Shaun Spadah both fell at the first fence, and there were two equine fatalities: The Inca II at Becher's Brook and Awbeg at the Canal Turn.

== Finishing Order ==
Position	Name	Jockey	Age	Handicap (st-lb)	SP	Distance
1	Music Hall	Lewis Rees	9	11-8	100/9	12 lengths
2	Drifter	William Watkinson	8	10-0	18/1	6 lengths
3	Taffytus	Ted Leader	9	11-0	66/1	A Distance
4	Sergeant Murphy	Charles Hawkins	12	11-0	100/6	
5	A Double Escape	Tuppy Bennet	8	10-3	40/1	

== Non-finishers ==
Fence	Name	Jockey	Age	Handicap (st-lb)	SP	Fate
01	Shaun Spadah	Dick Rees	11	12-3	100/8	
01	Southampton	Harry Brown	6	11-10	100/12 F	
04	Vaulx	Tony Escott	8	10-0	25/1	Fell
05	Clashing Arms	Jack Anthony	7	11-3	9/1	Fell
06	Grey Dawn V	Alf Newey	9	10-0	25/1	
06	The Inca II	Fred Brookes	8	10-0	100/1	Fell
06	Wavertree	Bryan Bletsoe	11	11-10	25/1	Fell
08	All White	Bob Chadwick	8	11-0	100/7	Brought Down
08	Awbeg	Mr A Knowles	11	10-0	100/1	Fell
08	General Saxham	Mr P Dennis	9	10-9	66/1	
08	Norton	Isaac Morgan	7	11-8	40/1	Fell
?	Clonree	J Mahoney	8	11-6	33/1	
?	St Bernard	Mr R Pulford	8	11-5	66/1	
?	The Turk II	Ivor Anthony	12	10-11	33/1	
?	Super Man	Roger Burford	7	10-9	100/1	
?	Gay Lochinvar	F Croney	6	10-8	100/1	
?	Dunadry	James Hogan jnr	9	10-7	66/1	
?	Any Time	Gilbert Wall	11	10-5	100/1	
?	Square Up	J Rennison	9	10-4	20/1	
?	Mask-On	J Burns	9	10-2	50/1	
?	Arabian Knight	R Spares	6	10-2	100/1	
?	Sudan II	G Calder	13	10-0	100/1	
?	Masterful	Mr M Blair	9	10-0	66/1	
?	Dunstanburgh	H Watkins	10	10-0	100/1	
?	Confessor	Robert Trudgill	8	10-0	100/1	
?	Such A Sport	Captain A C Delmege	11	10-0	100/1	
22	Arravale	Percy Whitaker	7	10-10	100/7	
