= Manifesto (horse) =

British-bred Thoroughbred racehorse

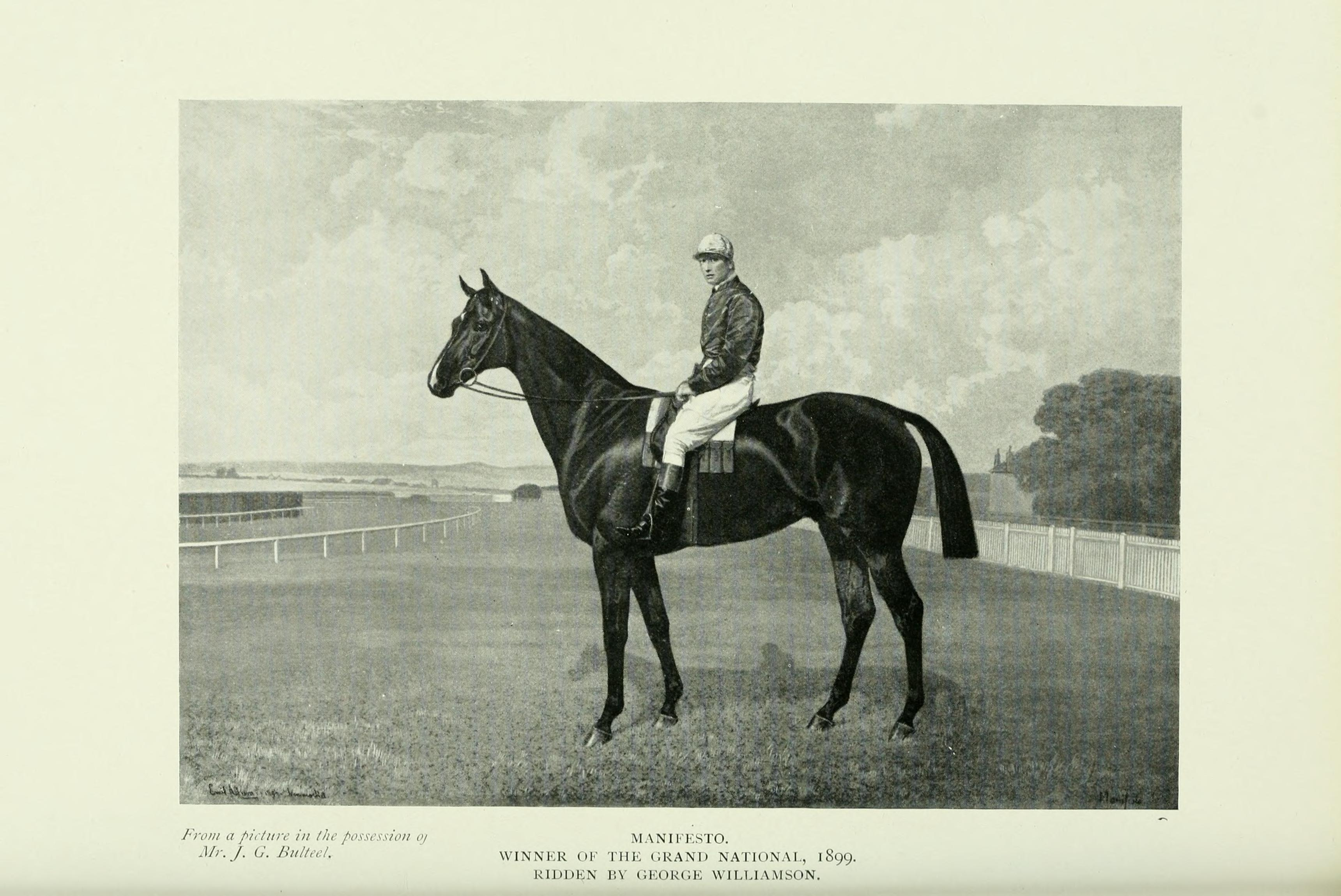
- Manifesto, ridden by George Williamson (from Heroes and heroines of the Grand National)
- Sire: Man of War
- Grandsire: Ben Battle
- Dam: Vae Victus
- Damsire: King Victor
- Sex: Gelding
- Foaled: 1888
- Country: United Kingdom
- Colour: Bay
- Breeder: Harry Dyas
- Owner: Harry Dyas; Mr J.G. Bulteel
- Trainer: Willie McAuliffe; Willie Moore

Major wins
- Irish Champion Steeplchase (1892); Lancashire Chase (1894); Aintree Grand National (1897, 1899)

Honours
- Manifesto Novices' Chase at Aintree

Manifesto (foaled 1888) was a British National Hunt racehorse best known for winning the Aintree Grand National twice and running in the race a record eight times. He was instrumental in restoring the prestige and popularity to the Grand National as the race had been marred by corruption in previous years.

== Breeding ==
Manifesto was bred by Harry Dyas and was a son of Man O’War (not to be confused with the American champion) out of a mare called Vae Victus. He was a good looking bay horse with a white snip on his nose.

== Racing career ==
=== Early career ===
Manifesto was given time to mature before making his racing debut. He fell in his first race in 1892 before winning a maiden hurdle race over two miles. He went on to win the Irish Champion Steeplechase and the 1894 Lancashire Chase.

=== 1895 Grand National ===
Manifesto first attempted to win the Grand National aged 7. He managed to finish fourth behind Wild Man Of Borneo under a weight of 11 stone 2 lbs and ridden by Terry Kavanagh.

=== 1896 Grand National ===
This year ridden by his owner Harry Dyas, Manifesto got no further than first fence after he collided mid-air with Redhill and fell.

=== 1897 Grand National ===
In a bid to change his luck in the race, Dyas employed Willie McAuliffe to train Manifesto with Terry Kavanagh riding again. The horse was weighted with 11 stone 3 lbs and sent off the 6-1 favourite. After one false start, the field remained intact until the Canal Turn with Manifesto racing second. A duel developed between Manifesto and Timon, before that rival fell at the third last fence. Manifesto was left clear to win by 20 lengths from Filbert.

=== 1898 season ===
Manifesto won a two-mile chase at Gatwick in February, before being sold to Mr J.G. Bulteel for £4,000 and being sent to Willie Moore’s yard.

==== Injury ====
Disaster struck in the lead up to the 1898 Grand National, when a stable boy left Manifesto’s stable door open and the horse escaped. Although he was recaptured, he managed to badly bruise a fetlock jumping a gate, leading to him missing the race.

=== 1899 Grand National ===
Manifesto was weighted with 12 stone 7 lbs with his half-sister Gentle Ida the next highest weight on 11 stone 7 lbs. The mare was favourite at 4-1 with Manifesto at 5-1. Also in the line up was the five-year-old Ambush II, owned by the Prince of Wales (future Edward VII). George Williamson was employed to ride Manifesto.

Due to frosty ground, Aintree officials spread hay on either side of some of the fences, including at the Canal Turn. Cruising in mid-field, Manifesto jumped the fence well, but lost his footing on landing. Williamson lost both stirrups and even touched the ground with his feet, but Manifesto was able to gather himself and continue with his jockey intact. Once Gentle Ida fell, Manifesto had a simple task and won by five lengths from Ford Of Fyne, equalling the weight carrying record in the process.

=== 1900 Grand National ===
By virtue of his two wins, Manifesto was given 12 stone 13 lbs to carry, while Ambush II carried 24 lbs less. The weight told and the younger horse won with Manifesto only third while easing down. Both the win by the Royal horse and Manifesto’s game effort under his burden were applauded by the crowd.

=== 1901 Grand National ===
Both Ambush II and Manifesto missed the 1901 renewal, and Grudon won in their absence.

=== 1902 Grand National ===
Manifesto was 14 when he lined up the following year, but he still carried 12 stone 8 lbs and was ridden by Ernest Piggott. In heavy ground, he finished third behind Shannon Lass who carried only 10 stone 1 lb. Many observers thought this was his finest effort in the race.

=== 1903 Grand National ===
Manifesto returned for the seventh time under 12 stone 3 lbs with old jockey George Williamson. He ran a tremendous race to finish third behind Drumcree, holding off the seven-year-old Kirkland (the 1905 winner) for third. Many onlookers were sure this would be Manifesto’s last appearance in the race.

=== 1904 Grand National ===
Manifesto ran in the National one final time as a sixteen-year-old. Champion Flat jockey Mornington Cannon gained permission to ride the horse in his final gallop before the race and Ernest Piggott partnered him over the fences. Under 12 stone 1 lb, Manifesto finished in eighth behind Moifaa, who had travelled all the way from New Zealand.

So Manifesto's 10 year Grand National stats are as follows.

1895-4th...1896-Fell...1897-1st...1898-Not Entered...1899-1st...1900-3rd...1901-Not Entered...1902-3rd...1903-3rd...1904-8th

== Retirement ==
Manifesto retired from racing immediately after the Grand National to a tremendous reception from the crowd. Upon his death, his skeleton was gifted to a veterinary college in Liverpool. The Grade 2 Manifesto Novices' Chase run over 2.5 miles at Aintree is run in his honour.
