= 1913 Grand National =

English steeplechase horse race

- Grand National
- Location: Aintree
- Date: 4 April 1913
- Winning horse: Covertcoat
- Starting price: 100/9
- Jockey: Percy Woodland
- Trainer: Robert Gore
- Owner: Sir Charles Assheton-Smith
- Conditions: Soft (good to soft places)

The 1913 Grand National was the 75th renewal of the Grand National horse race that took place at Aintree near Liverpool, England, in 1913.

Owner Sir Charles Assheton-Smith also provided the winner in 1912, and had done so many years earlier, in 1893, when he was simply known as Charles Duff.

== Finishing Order ==
Position	Name	Jockey	Age	Handicap (st-lb)	SP	Distance
01	Covertcoat	Percy Woodland	7	11-6	100/9	A Distance
02	Irish Mail	Owen Anthony	6	11-4	25/1	
03	Carsey	Jack Tyrrwhitt-Drake	10	12-0	100/9	

== Non-finishers ==
Fence	Name	Jockey	Age	Handicap (st-lb)	SP	Fate
?	Dysart	Paget O'Brien-Butler	8	12-4	50/1	?
?	Trianon III	W O'Connor	8	12-3	33/1	?
?	Highbridge	F Williams	7	12-0	100/9	?
?	Ballyhackle	Harry Usher	10	11-11	5/1	?
?	Thowl Pin	Isaac Morgan	8	11-9	20/1	?
?	Jamagata	M Bartosch	7	11-8	NR	?
?	Regent	Jack Anthony	8	11-7	66/1	?
?	The Miner	Leslie Brabazon	8	11-6	100/1	?
?	Melamar	William Payne snr	7	11-6	100/8	?
?	Black Plum	Richard Morgan	9	11-5	66/1	?
?	Axle Pin	Percy Whitaker	9	11-4	100/8	?
?	Blow Pipe	Bill Smith	8	11-4	25/1	?
?	The Rejected IV	Gilbert Cotton	10	11-3	40/1	?
?	Merry Land	Robert Trudgill	9	11-3	100/1	?
?	Fetlar's Pride	Frank Morgan	12	11-0	33/1	?
?	Fearless VII	Mr G Pigot-Moodie	10	11-0	100/1	?
?	Wavelet	Alfred Newey	6	11-0	?	?
?	Tokay	Matt Hopper	7	11-0	50/1	?
?	Foolhardy	William MacNeill	11	11-0	100/1	?
?	Bloodstone	Frank Lyall	11	12-7	100/7	?
