= 1923 Grand National =

English steeplechase horse race

- Grand National
- Location: Aintree Racecourse
- Date: 23 March 1923
- Winning horse: (United States) Sergeant Murphy
- Starting price: 100/6
- Jockey: Capt. Tuppy Bennet
- Trainer: George Blackwell
- Owner: (United States) Stephen Sanford
- Conditions: Good to firm

External videos
- Silent highlights of the 1923 Grand National (British Pathé)

The 1923 Grand National was the 82nd renewal of the Grand National horse race that took place at Aintree Racecourse near Liverpool on 23 March 1923.

The race was won by Sergeant Murphy, a 13-year-old 100/6 shot ridden by Captain Tuppy Bennet and trained by George Blackwell for its owner Stephen Sanford, who collected the £5,000 prize for the winner.

The 1921 winner Shaun Spadah - ridden by same jockey, Dick Rees - finished in second place, with Conjuror II in third and Punt Gun fourth. Twenty-eight horses ran and all returned safely to the stables.

In attendance at Aintree were King George V, the Prince of Wales and the Duke of York.

In 1938 a Hollywood film titled Sergeant Murphy was loosely based on the winner. Ronald Reagan starred as the owner of the horse in the film.

== Finishing Order ==
Position	Name	Jockey	Age	Handicap (st-lb)	SP	Distance
1	Sergeant Murphy	Tuppy Bennet	13	11-3	100/6	3 lengths
2	Shaun Spadah	Dick Rees	12	12-7	20/1	6 lengths
3	Conjuror II	Mr C Dewhurst	11	11-0	100/6	15 Lengths
4	Punt Gun	Michael Tighe	10	11-1	20/1	
5	Drifter	William Watkinson	9	10-10	20/1	
6	Max	James Hogan jnr	7	11-5	25/1	
7	Cinders II	W Williams	11	10-0	?	

== Non-finishers ==
Fence	Name	Jockey	Age	Handicap (st-lb)	SP	Fate
6	Arravale	Percy Whitaker	8	11-2	10/1	Fell
15	Turkey Buzzard	Fred Brookes	10	12-6	33/1	Fell
21	Forewarned	Jack Anthony	8	11-5	11/2	Fell
28	Square Dance	Lewis Rees	11	12-0	100/6	Fell
?	Taffytus	Ted Leader	10	11-7	100/8	Fell
?	Trentino	John Wilson	9	1-7	66/1	Fell
?	Duettiste	Tony Escott	10	11-7	40/1	Pulled Up
?	Madrigal	D Colbert	6	10-12	66/1	Pulled Up
?	Eureka II	A Stubbs	6	10-10	40/1	Fell
?	My Rath	Mr C Chapman	11	10-8	66/1	Fell
?	Ammonal	Isaac Morgan	6	10-7	40/1	Fell
?	Pencoed	Mr D Thomas	8	10-3	?	Pulled Up
?	The Turk II	C Donnelly	13	10-2	?	Fell
?	Pam Nut	Sylvester Duffy	10	10-0	?	Pulled Up
?	Canny Knight	A Vause	9	10-0	?	Fell
?	Cinzano	Frank Brown	6	10-0	?	Refused
?	Masterful	Peter Roberts	10	10-0	?	Pulled Up
?	Navana	F Mason	9	10-0	66/1	Pulled Up
?	Gardenrath	J Whelehan	8	10-0	66/1	Pulled Up
?	Libretto	Georges Parfrement	8	10-0	100/8	Pulled Up
?	Liffeybank	Mr K Gibson	?	10-0	?	Pulled Up
