= British jump racing Champion Jockey =

British national hunt racing jockeys' championship

Tony McCoy was champion jockey a record twenty times.

In Great Britain's National Hunt racing, the title of champion jockey is bestowed on the rider who has the most wins during a racing season. From its inception in 1900 to 1925, the award was given to the jockey who had the most winners during a calendar year. Beginning in 1926, this changed to most winners ridden during a campaign season; the 1926 winner was rewarded for the 1925–26 season, for example.

Tony McCoy was champion jockey a record twenty times. He also recorded the most wins in a season, with 289 in 2001–02. The title has been shared on three occasions: in 1944–45, in 1968–69 and in 1981–82. Three amateurs have won the title, though none more recently than 1919. One of them, Jack Anthony, won both as an amateur (in 1914) and as a professional (in 1922). Racing was suspended for several years during World War II, which meant there was no championship in 1943 or 1944.

In the 2015–16 season, for the first time the championship was rewarded with prize money. The champion received £15,000 and smaller prizes were awarded down to fifth place. From 2016 onwards, the champion jockey receives a trophy designed by Asprey and chosen by McCoy, after the previous one was gifted to him upon his retirement.

== Champion jockeys ==
Table legend

(*) Title given for calendar year rather than campaign season

Season	Jockey	Status	Winners	Reference
2025–26	Sean Bowen	Professional	241	
2024–25	Sean Bowen	Professional	180	
2023–24	Harry Cobden	Professional	164	
2022–23	Brian Hughes	Professional	165	
2021–22	Brian Hughes	Professional	204	
2020–21	Harry Skelton	Professional	152	
2019–20	Brian Hughes	Professional	141	
2018–19	Richard Johnson	Professional	200	
2017–18	Richard Johnson	Professional	176	
2016–17	Richard Johnson	Professional	180	
2015–16	Richard Johnson	Professional	235	
2014–15	Tony McCoy	Professional	231	
2013–14	Tony McCoy	Professional	218	
2012–13	Tony McCoy	Professional	185	
2011–12	Tony McCoy	Professional	199	
2010–11	Tony McCoy	Professional	218	
2009–10	Tony McCoy	Professional	195	
2008–09	Tony McCoy	Professional	186	
2007–08	Tony McCoy	Professional	140	
2006–07	Tony McCoy	Professional	184	
2005–06	Tony McCoy	Professional	178	
2004–05	Tony McCoy	Professional	200	
2003–04	Tony McCoy	Professional	209	
2002–03	Tony McCoy	Professional	258	
2001–02	Tony McCoy	Professional	289	
2000–01	Tony McCoy	Professional	191	
1999–2000	Tony McCoy	Professional	245	
1998–99	Tony McCoy	Professional	186	
1997–98	Tony McCoy	Professional	253	
1996–97	Tony McCoy	Professional	190	
1995–96	Tony McCoy	Professional	175	
1994–95	Richard Dunwoody	Professional	160	
1993–94	Richard Dunwoody	Professional	197	
1992–93	Richard Dunwoody	Professional	173	
1991–92	Peter Scudamore	Professional	175	
1990–91	Peter Scudamore	Professional	141	
1989–90	Peter Scudamore	Professional	170	
1988–89	Peter Scudamore	Professional	221	
1987–88	Peter Scudamore	Professional	132	
1986–87	Peter Scudamore	Professional	123	
1985–86	Peter Scudamore	Professional	91	
1984–85	John Francome	Professional	101	
1983–84	John Francome	Professional	131	
1982–83	John Francome	Professional	106	
1981–82	John Francome / Peter Scudamore	Professional	120	
1980–81	John Francome	Professional	105	
1979–80	Jonjo O'Neill	Professional	115	
1978–79	John Francome	Professional	95	
1977–78	Jonjo O'Neill	Professional	149	
1976–77	Tommy Stack	Professional	97	
1975–76	John Francome	Professional	96	
1974–75	Tommy Stack	Professional	82	
1973–74	Ron Barry	Professional	94	
1972–73	Ron Barry	Professional	125	
1971–72	Bob Davies	Professional	89	
1970–71	Graham Thorner	Professional	74	
1969–70	Bob Davies	Professional	91	
1968–69	Terry Biddlecombe / Bob Davies	Professional	77	
1967–68	Josh Gifford	Professional	82	
1966–67	Josh Gifford	Professional	122	
1965–66	Terry Biddlecombe	Professional	102	
1964–65	Terry Biddlecombe	Professional	114	
1963–64	Josh Gifford	Professional	94	
1962–63	Josh Gifford	Professional	70	
1961–62	Stan Mellor	Professional	80	
1960–61	Stan Mellor	Professional	118	
1959–60	Stan Mellor	Professional	68	
1958–59	Tim Brookshaw	Professional	83	
1957–58	Fred Winter	Professional	82	
1956–57	Fred Winter	Professional	80	
1955–56	Fred Winter	Professional	74	
1954–55	Tim Molony	Professional	67	
1953–54	Dick Francis	Professional	76	
1952–53	Fred Winter	Professional	121	
1951–52	Tim Molony	Professional	99	
1950–51	Tim Molony	Professional	83	
1949–50	Tim Molony	Professional	95	
1948–49	Tim Molony	Professional	60	
1947–48	Bryan Marshall	Professional	66	
1946–47	Jack Dowdeswell	Professional	58	
1945–46	Fred Rimell	Professional	54	
1944–45	Frenchie Nicholson / Fred Rimell	Professional	15	
1943–44	Racing suspended	–		
1942–43	Racing suspended	–		
1941–42	Ron Smyth	Professional	12	
1940–41	Gerry Wilson	Professional	22	
1939–40	Fred Rimell	Professional	24	
1938–39	Fred Rimell	Professional	61	
1937–38	Gerry Wilson	Professional	59	
1936–37	Gerry Wilson	Professional	45	
1935–36	Gerry Wilson	Professional	57	
1934–35	Gerry Wilson	Professional	73	
1933–34	Gerry Wilson	Professional	56	
1932–33	Gerry Wilson	Professional	61	
1931–32	Billy Stott	Professional	77	
1930–31	Billy Stott	Professional	81	
1929–30	Billy Stott	Professional	77	
1928–29	Billy Stott	Professional	76	
1927–28	Billy Stott	Professional	88	
1926–27	Dick Rees	Professional	59	
1925–26	Ted Leader	Professional	61	
1925*	E. Foster	Professional	76	
1924*	Dick Rees	Professional	108	
1923*	Dick Rees	Professional	64	
1922*	Jack Anthony	Professional	78	
1921*	Dick Rees	Professional	65	
1920*	Dick Rees	Professional	64	
1919*	H. Brown	Amateur	48	
1918*	George Duller	Professional	17	
1917*	W. Smith	Professional	15	
1916*	C. Hawkins	Professional	17	
1915*	Ernie Piggott	Professional	44	
1914*	Jack Anthony	Amateur	60	
1913*	Ernie Piggott	Professional	60	
1912*	Ivor Anthony	Professional	78	
1911*	W. Payne	Professional	76	
1910*	Ernie Piggott	Professional	67	
1909*	R. Gordon	Professional	45	
1908*	P. Cowley	Professional	65	
1907*	Frank Mason	Professional	59	
1906*	Frank Mason	Professional	58	
1905*	Frank Mason	Professional	73	
1904*	Frank Mason	Professional	59	
1903*	Percy Woodland	Professional	54	
1902*	Frank Mason	Professional	67	
1901*	Frank Mason	Professional	58	
1900*	H. S. Sidney	Amateur	53	

== Records ==
- Most titles - 20, Tony McCoy
- Most consecutive titles - 20, Tony McCoy (1995–2015)
- Most wins in a season - 289, Tony McCoy (2001–2002)
- Most runner-up finishes - 17 Richard Johnson

== See also ==
- British jump racing Champion Trainer
- British flat racing Champion Jockey
- British flat racing Champion Trainer
