= 1921 Grand National =

English steeplechase horse race

- Grand National
- Location: Aintree Racecourse
- Date: 18 March 1921
- Winning horse: Shaun Spadah
- Starting price: 100/9
- Jockey: Dick Rees
- Trainer: George Poole
- Owner: (Scotland) Malcolm McAlpine
- Conditions: Heavy

External videos
- Silent highlights of the 1921 Grand National (British Pathé)

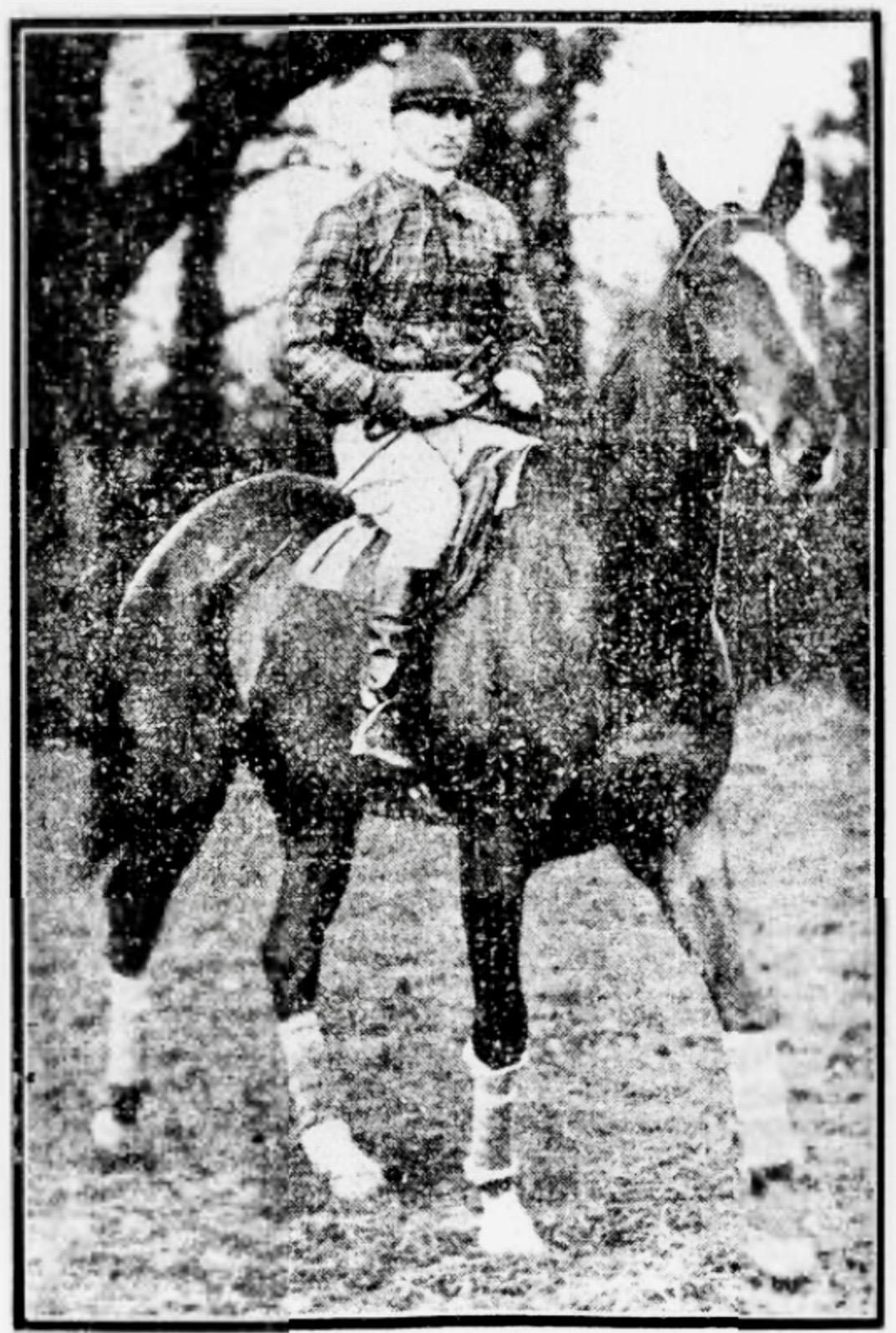
Shaun Spadah with jockey Dick Rees

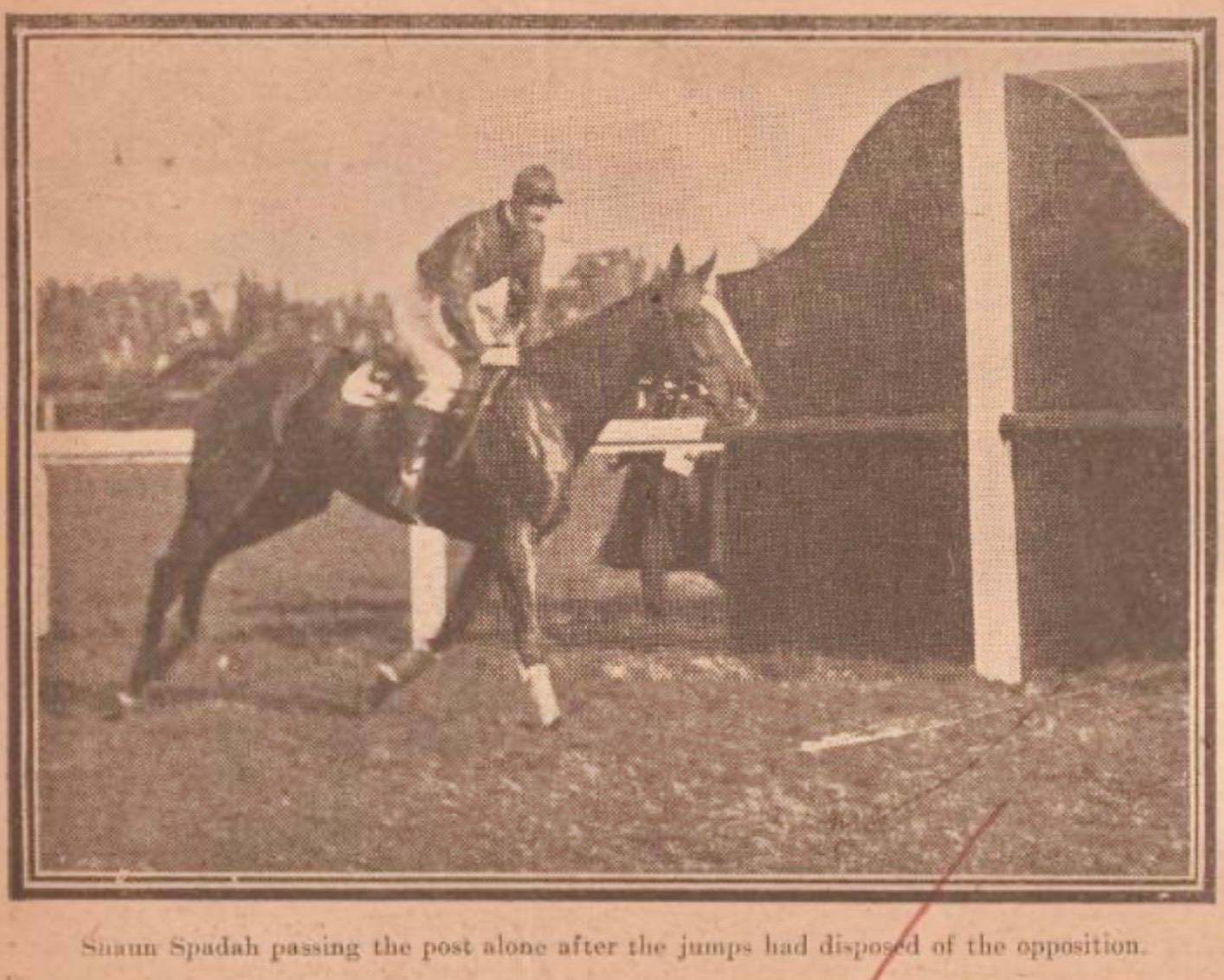
Shaun Spadah crossing the finishing post in the 1921 Grand National

The 1921 Grand National was the 80th renewal of the Grand National horse race that took place at Aintree Racecourse near Liverpool, England, on 18 March 1921.

The race was won by Shaun Spadah, a 100/9 bet ridden by Dick Rees and trained by George Poole for owner Malcolm McAlpine. The winner was the only horse to complete the course without falling.

In second place was The Bore, who remounted after falling at the second-last fence, having raced alongside the winner since Turkey Buzzard fell at Becher's Brook on the second circuit. All White and Turkey Buzzard were also remounted to finish third and fourth respectively. No other horses completed the race. Thirty-five horses ran and all returned safely to the stables.

== Finishing Order ==
Position	Name	Jockey	Age	Handicap (st-lb)	SP	Distance
01	Shaun Spadah	Dick Rees	10	11-7	100/9	A distance
02 Remounted	The Bore	Harry Brown	10	11-8	9/1 F	A Distance {Fell 29, Rem}
03	All White	Bob Chadwick	7	10-13	33/1	
04	Turkey Buzzard	Tuppy Bennet	8	12-2	100/9	Last to complete

== Non-finishers ==
Fence	Name	Jockey	Age	Handicap (st-lb)	SP	Fate
05	Eamon Beag	M Connors	8	10-4	10/1	Fell
16	Loch Allen	John Kelly	10	11-0	100/1	Fell
?	Clonree	Tom Hulme	7	12-0	33/1	
?	Old Tay Bridge	Ernest Piggott	7	11-8	100/8	
?	General Saxham	Willie Smith	8	11-4	66/1	
?	Garryvoe	Ivor Anthony	7	11-2	100/9	
?	Glencorrig	Henry Bletsoe	7	10-13	50/1	
?	Daydawn	Jack Anthony	8	10-13	100/7	
?	Prince Clifton	Lewis Rees	8	10-13	66/1	
?	White Surrey	Tony Escott	9	10-12	33/1	
?	Rather Dark	A Gregson	7	10-12	33/1	
?	Bobbydazzler	A Stubbs	7	10-12	100/1	
?	Short Knock	M Halpin	12	10-10	100/1	
?	Halston	Mr Frith	9	10-9	50/1	
?	Hill of Camas	Capt J C Delmege	13	10-7	100/1	
?	Wavebeam	Mr S C Lloyd	10	10-7	100/1	
?	Picture Saint	N Hayes	9	10-5	100/1	
?	Ballysax	George Goswell	7	10-5	100/1	
?	Bonnie Charlie	Mr M C Blair	13	10-4	100/1	
?	Blazers	William Watkinson	7	10-4	30/1	
?	Rufus XXI	Captain Doyle	10	10-0	100/1	
?	Cupid's Dart	James Hogan Jnr	7	9-12	100/1	
?	Long Lough	Robert Trudgill	9	9-12	100/1	
?	White Cockade	H Wicks	8	9-10	100/1	
?	Forewarned	Roger Burford	6	9-10	50/1	
?	Glenefly	Tommy Willmot	7	9-7	100/1	
?	Prosperitz	W Daly	7	9-7	100/1	
?	Charlbury	B Ellis	13	9-7	100/1	
?	Hackam	G Clancy	6	9-7	66/1	
?	Redstart V	Major A W H James	13	9-7	100/1	
?	Any Time	Frank Wootton	10	10-6	50/1	
