= 1908 Grand National =

English steeplechase horse race

- Grand National
- Location: Aintree
- Date: 27 March 1908
- Winning horse: (United States) Rubio
- Starting price: 66/1
- Jockey: Henry Bletsoe
- Trainer: William Costello
- Owner: (Wales) Maj. Frank Douglas-Pennant
- Conditions: Soft (heavy in places)

The 1908 Grand National was the 70th renewal of the Grand National horse race that took place at Aintree near Liverpool, England, on 27 March 1908.

== Finishing Order ==
Position	Name	Jockey	Age	Handicap (st-lb)	SP	Distance
01	Rubio	Henry Bletsoe	10	10-5	66/1	10 Lengths
02	Mattie MacGregor	W Bissell	6	10-6	25/1	
03	The Lawyer III	Percy Whitaker	?	1-13	100/7	
04	Flaxman	Algernon Anthony	?	9-12	33/1	
05	Springbok	James O'Brien	?	11-5	?	
06	Red Hall	Mr H G Farrant	?	10-1	?	
07	Kirkland	Frank Mason	?	11-12	6/1	
08	Chorus	Bob Chadwick	?	10-5	?	Last to complete

== Non-finishers ==
Fence	Name	Jockey	Age	Handicap (st-lb)	SP	Fate
?	Mount Prospect's Future	Richard Morgan	6	11-11	100/7	Fell
?	Roman Law	Alfred Newey	?	11-2	100/7	Fell
?	Seisdon Prince	M Phelan	?	11-0	100/7	Fell
?	Extravagance	Harry Aylin	?	10-12	100/7	Knocked Over
?	Lara	Walter Bulteel	?	10-8	25/1	Fell
?	Nanoya	J Lynn	6	10-7	?	Fell
?	Tom West	H Murphy	?	10-7	8/1	Fell
?	Jenkinstown	Frank Morgan	?	10-5	?	Pulled Up
?	York II	W Rollason	?	10-4	?	Fell
?	Paddy Maher	Mr O'B Butler	?	10-3	100/8	Fell
?	Dathia	T Anthony	?	10-0	?	Pulled Up
?	Prophet III	Joe Dillon	?	10-0	?	Fell
?	Johnstown Lad	Edmund Driscoll	?	9-12	10/1	Fell
?	Wee Busbie	D Phelan	?	9-11	?	Fell
?	Alert III	J Harland	?	9-11	?	Fell
?	Wild Fox III	Captain W A Pallin	6	9-9	?	Fell
