= Ally Sloper (horse) =

British Thoroughbred racehorse

- Sire: Travelling Lad
- Grandsire: Gallinule
- Dam: Sally In Our Alley
- Damsire: Discord
- Foaled: 1909
- Owner: Lady Margaret Nelson
- Trainer: Aubrey Hastings

Major wins
- Grand National (1915)

Ally Sloper was a Thoroughbred racehorse noted for winning the 1915 Grand National.

A five-year-old owned by Lady Margaret Nelson and trained by Aubrey Hastings, it was ridden by Mr Jack Anthony. Carrying 10 st 5 lb, Ally Sloper won the race by two lengths at a price of 100/8 and in a time of 9 min 47.8 s. It was Aubrey Hastings' second national winner having won the race in 1906 with Ascetics Silver. It was also the first Grand National winner to be owned by a woman.

== Pedigree ==
Pedigree of Ally Sloper
Sire Travelling Lad 1896	Gallinule 1884	Isonomy	Sterling
Sire Travelling Lad 1896	Gallinule 1884	Isonomy	Isola Bella
Sire Travelling Lad 1896	Gallinule 1884	Moorhen	Hermit
Sire Travelling Lad 1896	Gallinule 1884	Moorhen	Skirmisher Mare
Sire Travelling Lad 1896	Homeless 1885	The Rover	Blair Athol
Sire Travelling Lad 1896	Homeless 1885	The Rover	Crinon*
Sire Travelling Lad 1896	Homeless 1885	Joan of Arc	Martyrdom
Sire Travelling Lad 1896	Homeless 1885	Joan of Arc	Ladylike
Dam Sally in Our Alley 1887	Discord 1876	See Saw	Buccaneer
Dam Sally in Our Alley 1887	Discord 1876	See Saw	Margery Daw*
Dam Sally in Our Alley 1887	Discord 1876	Anthem	Cathedral
Dam Sally in Our Alley 1887	Discord 1876	Anthem	Melody
Dam Sally in Our Alley 1887	Our Mary Ann 1865	Voltigeur	Voltaire
Dam Sally in Our Alley 1887	Our Mary Ann 1865	Voltigeur	Martha Lynn
Dam Sally in Our Alley 1887	Our Mary Ann 1865	Garnish	Faugh-a-Ballagh
Dam Sally in Our Alley 1887	Our Mary Ann 1865	Garnish	Gaiety

* Ally Sloper is inbred 5S x 4D to the mare Margery Daw, meaning that she appears fifth generation (via Crinon) on the sire side of his pedigree, and fourth generation on the dam side of his pedigree.
