= Dick Rees =

Welsh champion jockey, winner of the 1921 Grand National

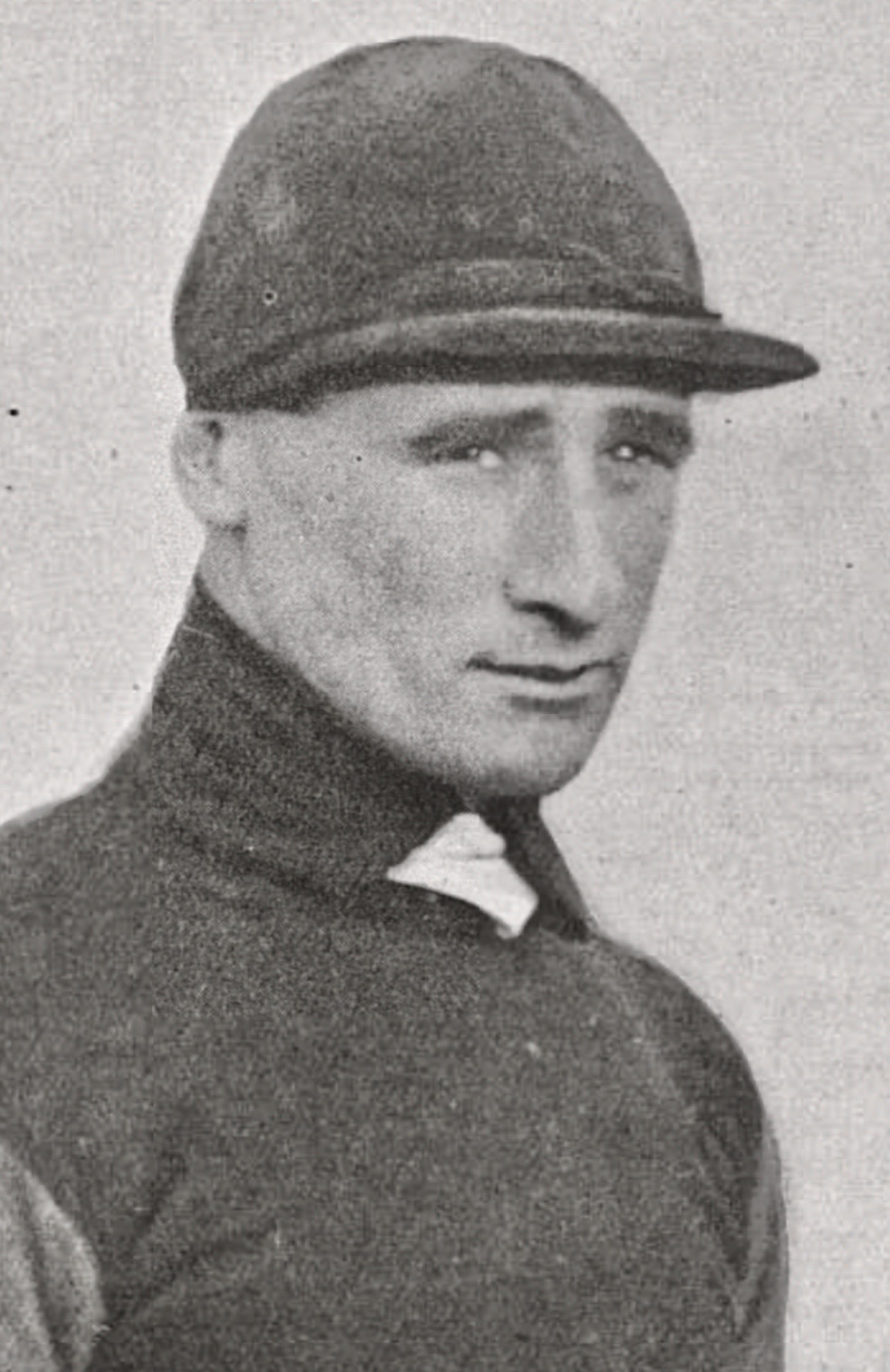
- Dick Rees in 1924

Personal information
- Born: 30 November 1894 Pembroke, Pembrokeshire, Wales
- Died: 14 August 1951 (aged 56) Lewes, Sussex, England
- Occupation: Jockey

Horse racing career
- Sport: Horse racing

Major racing wins
- Grand National - 1921: Grand Sefton Steeplechase - 1921; Cheltenham Gold Cup - 1924, 1928, 1929; Grand Steeple-Chase de Paris - 1925; Champion Hurdle - 1929

Racing awards
- National Hunt Champion Jockey (1920, 1921, 1923, 1924, 1926-27)

Significant horses
- Shaun Spadah; Red Splash; Patron Saint; Easter Hero

Frederick Brychan Rees (1894 - 1951), known professionally as Dick Rees (sometimes Fred Rees or F. B. Rees) was a Welsh jockey who was the British Jump Racing Champion on five occasions in the 1920s. During the course of his career, Rees won the Cheltenham Gold Cup on three occasions, and the 1921 Grand National.

== Early life ==
Frederick Brychan Rees was born on 30 November 1894 in Pembroke, Pembrokeshire, Wales, to Brychan Rees, a veterinary surgeon, and Hilda Bowers. He grew up in Tenby.

Rees' Welsh upbringing revolved around hunting and point-to-point racing. He reportedly ran away from home aged 11 to become a stable lad and learn his trade. His first win came in 1911, in a farmers' race on a horse called Tommy that belonged to his father.

Alongside his brother, Lewis Bilbie Rees (who won the 1922 Grand National) Rees rode for Mr Harrison's Tenby stable as an amateur before the First World War. In 1914, Rees enlisted as a private in the Sussex Yeomanry, was commissioned into the Manchester Regiment and ultimately seconded to the Royal Flying Corps as an observer.

== Racing career ==
Rees resumed his National Hunt career after his demobilisation from the Army, turning professional in January 1920 to ride for Lewes-based trainer George Poole. He quickly established himself, claiming the title of champion jump jockey in his first year with a total of 64 wins across 1920. That proved to be a springboard for the next decade, and Rees would ride more winners over jumps in the 1920s than any of his rivals. He was again crowned champion jump jockey in 1921, 1923 and 1924. A fifth and final title came his way in the 1926-27 season, after the championship was reorganised to reflect the campaign season rather than the calendar year.

Rees' total of 108 winners - from just 348 mounts - in 1924 was a record that would stand for 28 years, until Fred Winter rode 121 winners in the 1952-53 season.

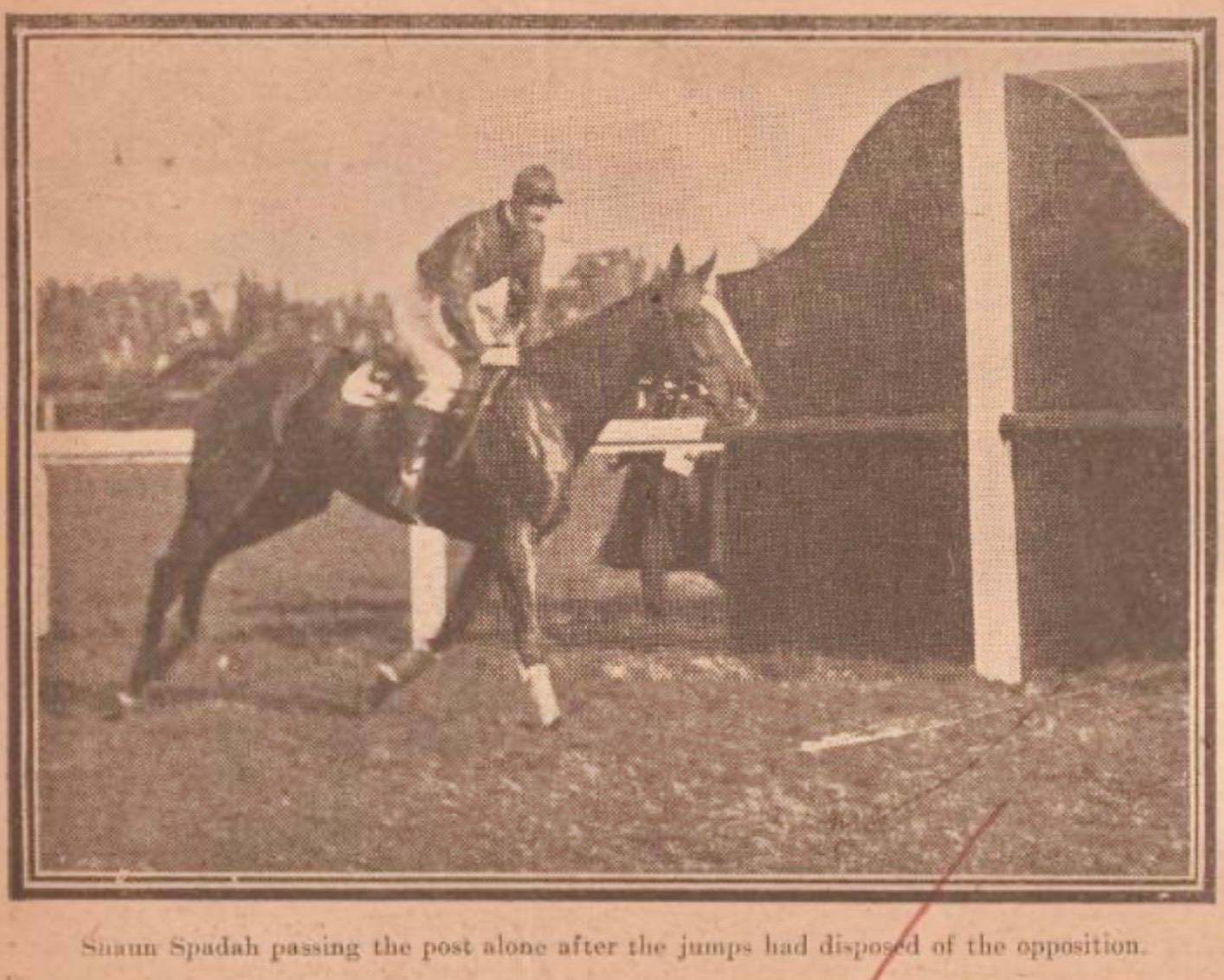
Rees winning the 1921 Grand National on Shaun Spadah

Rees' most significant winning rides were spread across this period of sustained success, with arguably the most famous coming early, in the 1921 Grand National at Aintree in Liverpool. On 18 March 1921, Rees took the mount of 10-year-old gelding Shaun Spadah - trained by Poole for owner Malcolm McAlpine. In a tumultuous race, only six of the 35 starters made it safely around the first circuit of the Aintree course. More would fall on the second. Eventually, only Shaun Spadah and The Bore remained in contention. At the penultimate fence The Bore dismounted his jockey, Harry Brown, and Rees found himself sufficiently free of the pack to bring Shaun Spadah home in comfort, scoring victory by a distance. Rees was the only jockey who finished without having to remount, though four others did ultimately complete - The Bore, All White and Turkey Buzzard. Later reports suggested that McAlpine handed his entire £7,000 prize money from the win to Rees as a reward.

In all, Rees would ride in 11 of the 12 runnings of the Grand National held between 1920 and 1931, missing only the 1930 edition through injury. While his only victory came in the 1921 race, he placed second in the 1923 Grand National, the third of four straight years in which his mount was Shaun Spadah.

Rees followed up his Grand National triumph on 8 November 1921, bringing home Norton - trained by Frank Hartigan - in the Grand Sefton Steeplechase, run over the same Aintree course. Norton was second by some lengths to The Turk II heading towards the final fence, but overhauled the deficit on the final flat.

On 12 March 1924 Rees became the first jockey to win the Cheltenham Gold Cup in its modern format. His mount was the 5-year-old Red Splash, trained by Fred Witherington for owner Major Humphrey Wyndham. Red Splash led from the off, initially in competition with Royal Chancellor. On the final flat, Red Splash was left to fight it out with Conjuror II and ultimately came home to win by a head.

In France, Rees won the Grand Steeple-Chase de Paris, held at Auteuil on 21 June 1925. Riding Silvo - a British horse also trained by Hartigan for owner Walter Midwood - in a flawless display, Rees rode home Silvo with comparative ease by a couple of lengths.

Rees won the Cheltenham Gold Cup for a second time in 1928 on his mount Patron Saint, a Welsh-trained horse from the stables of Stanley Harrison, owned by F. W. Keen, priced at 7/2. Patron Saint spent much of the race behind favourite Koko, but pulled ahead on the rails in the turn before the final straight. Koko was done, and Patron Saint drew away easily to take the win from Vive.

The last of Rees' great successes came at the Cheltenham Festival on 11 March 1929, when he would ride the winners of both the Champion Hurdle and Cheltenham Gold Cup on the same afternoon.

For the first of these two races Rees was partnered with Royal Falcon, trained by Bob Gore for Miss Victoria Williams-Bulkeley. Royal Falcon was pitted against standout favourite Clear Cash, previously undefeated over hurdles and widely expected to score an easy Champion Hurdle win. However, two obstacles from home, the four leading horses were almost in a line, and it was Royal Falcon who drew away to claim a convincing victory.

Rees was back in the saddle within the hour as he attempted to become the first jockey to win back-to-back runnings of the Cheltenham Gold Cup. His mount Easter Hero, trained by Jack Anthony for John Hay Whitney, was well fancied as the 7/4 favourite. What resulted was a commanding performance that would help to cement Easter Hero's legacy as an era-defining steeplechaser. Establishing an immediately lead from the off, comfortably clearing each fence as it came, Rees bought his horse home in a canter by 20 lengths.

Rees almost made it three Cheltenham Gold Cups in a row in 1930. Riding Gib, he was neck-and-neck with the leader before falling at the final fence. Ironically the winning horse was the same Easter Hero, this time under the mount of Tommy Cullinan, who, in denying Rees a third straight win, became the first horse to win the Gold Cup twice over. Rees would later acknowledge that Easter Hero was the finest horse he ever rode.

By the early 1930s Rees, who had suffered a number of injuries in the saddle (including a broken leg in 1927) was struggling to maintain his conditioned weight. Rumours of his retirement circulated in early 1931, which Rees initially denied. However, by the end of the 1931/32 jumping season Rees had ridden his final race.

== Personal life and death ==
Rees lived in Lewes, Sussex from 1920 until his death. He was married to Hilda and together they had three daughters. During the Second World War Rees joined the mounted section of the Lewes Home Guard.

Rees died on 14 August 1951, aged 56. He was eulogised in obituaries as the greatest jump jockey of the 1920s. in accordance with Rees’ own wishes, his ashes were sprinkled on the grave of his 1921 Grand National winning horse, Shaun Spadah, at Lewes racecourse, who had been buried there on his death in 1940.
