= Gatwick Racecourse =

Racecourse in Surrey, England

Coordinates: 51.159°N 0.169°W

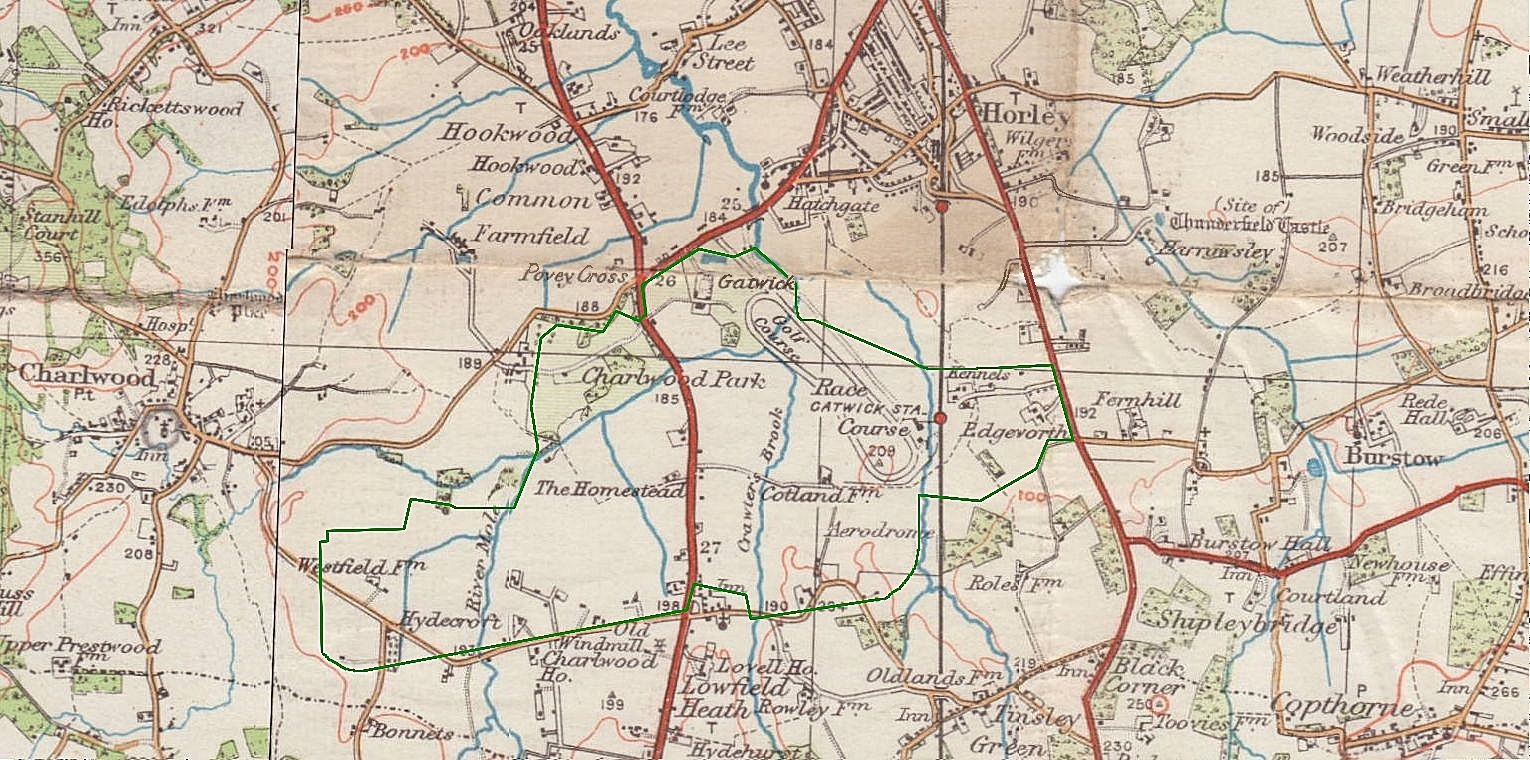
Gatwick Airport area as at about 1925 with current airport boundary in green outline. The racecourse is in the northeast end of the airport area.

Gatwick Racecourse was a racecourse in the county of Surrey, England near to Horley and Lowfield Heath. It was in use from 1891 to 1940 when it was closed at the start of the Second World War. The land is now part of London Gatwick Airport.

== History ==
In 1890, the descendants of the de Gatwick family sold the area to the newly established Gatwick Race Course Company. A farmhouse was built around 1890, with extensive stabling.

In 1891, Gatwick Racecourse opened beside the London–Brighton railway, and a dedicated station including sidings for horse boxes. The course held steeplechase and flat races.

The first race meeting was on 7 October 1891. Its race distances were 5 furlongs to 2 miles flat and 2 miles to 4 miles 856 yards National Hunt. During the Great War a Grand National substitute race, renamed The Racecourse Association Steeplechase for 1916 and the War National in 1917 and 1918, was hosted by Gatwick, although its principal race was the Gatwick Cup. From around 1930, the course was managed by George Gurton, who moved there from the Colchester area of Essex with his wife Ruby and two sons, Eustace Guy and Oswald George.

An aerodrome was opened around 1930 at the southeastern edge of the property, with a circular terminal building called The Beehive added in 1936. There is also a pub at nearby Tinsley Green called The Beehive. The aerodrome would eventually develop into Gatwick Airport. When the Second World War broke out in 1939 the military authorities requisitioned the open spaces of the racecourse for the War preparations. A final two day National Hunt meeting was staged on 27/28th March 1940, whilst a final Flat race meeting took place on the 14/15th June 1940.

== After closure ==
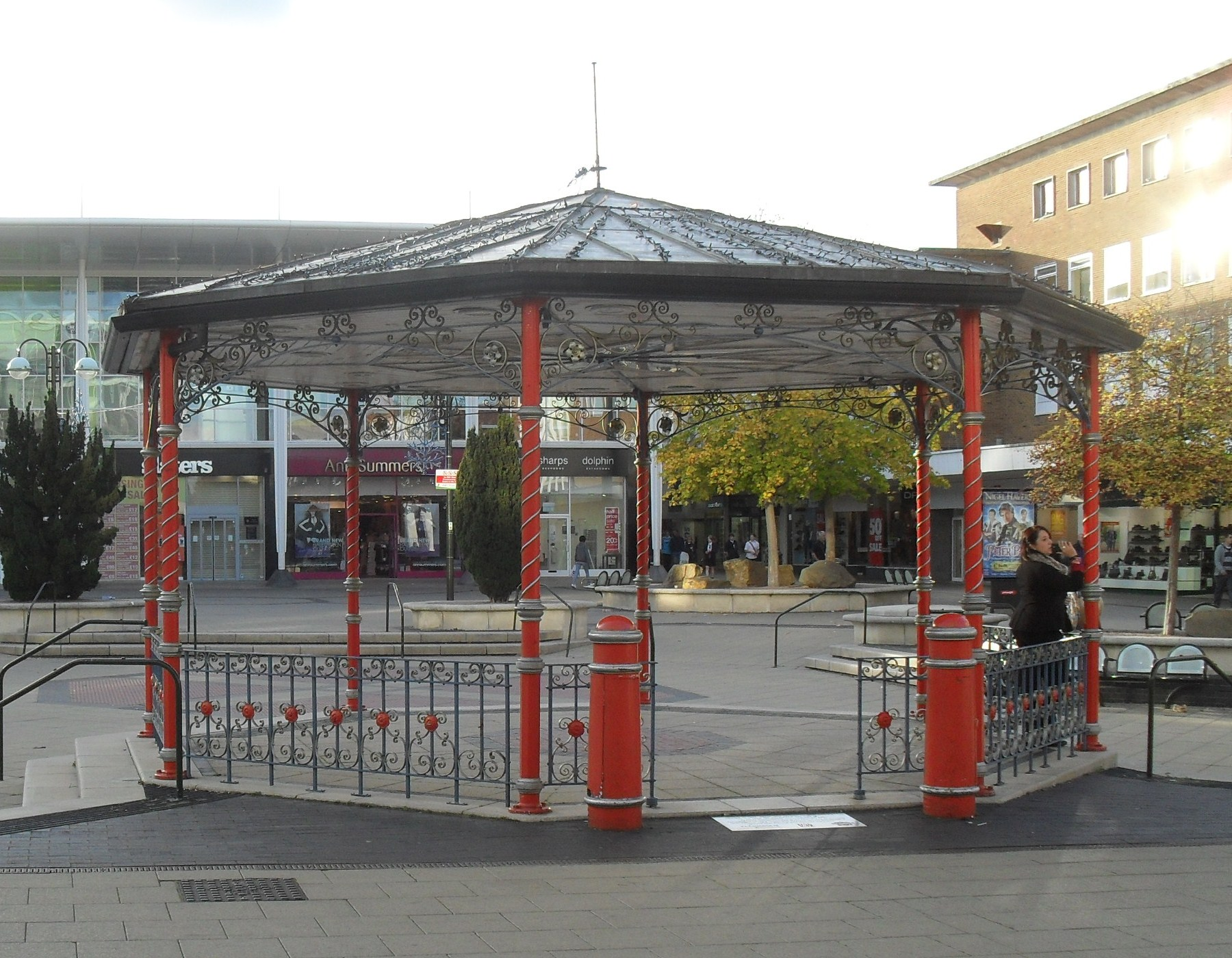
The racecourse bandstand, formerly in Queens Square, Crawley

After the Second World War, the stables and racecourse were used for training by, among others, Jack Holt. The surrounding land was farmed by George Gurton and subsequently by his elder son, Eustace Guy Gurton.

The Gurton family lived in the farmhouse until 1959 and farmed the area, using the land for mixed arable. Private trainers rented the stables and used the defunct course for training. In 1957, the racecourse was chosen as the site of the second major London airport, and the stables and house were demolished around 1960. A lodge house still remains on Povey Cross Road. The Gurton family emigrated to Australia in 1959. Many of Gurton's descendants still live in the surrounding Horley, Crawley and Charlwood areas. Some members of the family are buried at Charlwood Parish Church cemetery.

The airport was expanded onto the site of the racecourse, and as a result, no evidence remains that there was ever one there, but there is a restaurant named the "Racecourse Restaurant" in Gatwick Airport. There are also roads around the airport's boundaries called "Racecourse Road" and "Furlong Way". The racecourse's bandstand was relocated to Queens Square in Crawley. Following the redevelopment of Queens Square in 2017 the bandstand was relocated to Memorial Gardens in Crawley.
