= Ernest Piggott =

British jockey

Personal information
- Born: 1878 Nantwich, Cheshire, England
- Died: 13 March 1967 (aged 88–89) Oxford, England
- Occupation: Jockey
- Spouse: Margaret Cannon
- Children: 1
- Relative: Lester Piggott (grandson)

Horse racing career
- Sport: Horse racing

Major racing wins
- Major wins as jockey: Grand National; 3 times (1912, 1918, 1919)

Racing awards
- British jump racing Champion Jockey; 3 times (1910, 1913, 1915); French jump racing Champion Jockey (date unknown)

Significant horses
- Poethlyn, Jerry M.

Ernest Piggott (1878–13 March 1967) was a leading British jump racing jockey, whose family has become one of the leading dynasties in British horseracing. He was three times Champion Jockey and three times Grand National winner. His son, Ernest Keith Piggott (1904–1993), was also a leading jump jockey and National-winning trainer, while his grandson was the 11-times British flat racing Champion Jockey, Lester Piggott (1935–2022).

== Jockey Championships ==
Piggott began his English riding career in the late 1890s but from 1905 was based for several years in Belgium and France. He was champion jockey in France before returning to England where he won the 1910 British jump jockey championship with 67 winners. At the time this was the joint-record number of winners, although it was superseded the following year. His two other championships came in 1913 and 1915.

== Grand National ==
His first Grand National victory came in 1912 on 4/1 joint favourite, Jerry M, trained by Robert Gore and owned by Sir Charles Assheton-Smith. Although this trainer-owner pair won the following year's National with Covertcoat, Piggott was not on board, and it wasn't until 1918, when the Grand National was held at Gatwick (as Aintree had been commandeered by the War Office) that Piggott got a follow-up success with Poethlyn. The same horse gave him his third and final National victory back at Aintree in 1919 when it went off 11/4 favourite, the shortest priced winner in the history of the race. In so doing, he became the first jockey to win three Grand Nationals since Arthur Nightingall in 1901. Piggott also notably rode the 14-year-old Manifesto into third place in the 1902 National under a weight of 12 st 8 lb. This made it the oldest horse ever to have been placed in the National up to that point, and it remains the only horse ever to have been placed carrying such a weight.

== Later life ==
Piggott retired from the saddle in 1920 and trained for twenty years at Letcombe Regis from the following year. He retired from training in 1941.

== Personal life and death ==
In 1903, Piggott married Margaret Cannon, daughter of jockey, Tom Cannon, Sr. (1846–1917). Piggott's grandson was the jockey Lester Piggott (1935–2022). His great-grandson is the jockey Jamie Piggott.

Piggott died in a hospital in Oxford, on 13 March 1967, aged 88.

== See also ==
- List of significant families in British horse racing
