= Jack Anthony (jockey) =

Welsh jockey (1890–1954)

John Randolph Anthony
- Anthony in February 1935

Personal information
- Born: 21 January 1890 Carmarthenshire, Wales
- Died: 10 July 1954 (aged 64) Letcombe Regis, Berkshire, England

Sport
- Sport: Horse racing

John Randolph Anthony (21 January 1890 – 10 July 1954) was a Welsh National Hunt jockey. He was the sixth son of a horse-racing family, owners of the Cilfeithy Stud Farm in Llandyfaelog, Carmarthenshire, from where his older brothers Ivor and Owen also became, respectively, a successful jockey and a National Hunt trainer.

== Biography ==
An amateur until 1921, Jack rode his first winner in 1906 and was best known for his three victories in the Grand National steeplechase: on "Glenside" in 1911, on "Ally Sloper" in 1915, and on "Troytown" in 1920. He was the sixth jockey to win three Grand Nationals, and he also finished third in the 1925 event. He was a champion jockey on two occasions, in 1914 and 1928. In the latter year, he retired from riding to become a trainer. His biggest success in this role was with Easter Hero, owned by John Hay Whitney, who was the first horse to win the Cheltenham Gold Cup twice in succession, in 1929 under the mount of Dick Rees and again in 1930, when ridden by Tommy Cullinan.

Jack died in 1954 at Manor Farm House in Letcombe Regis, Berkshire. In 1991 he was included in the Welsh Sports Hall of Fame.

== Sources ==
- Brief biography
