= Sopley =

Village in Hampshire, England

Coordinates: 50.771°N 1.779°W

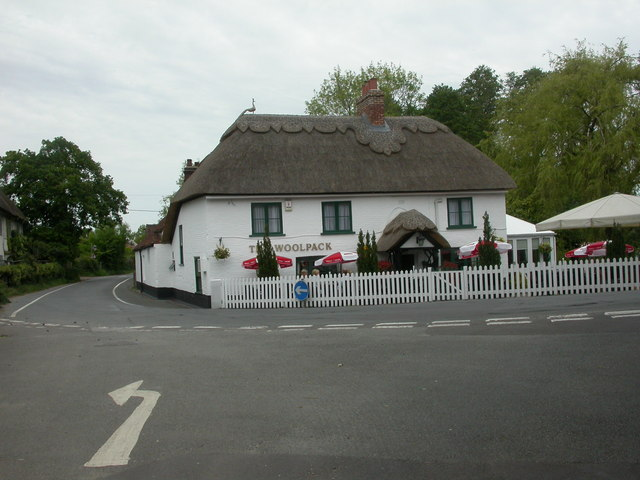
- The Woolpack Inn, Sopley village

- Location within Hampshire
- Population: 1,028 (in 2021)
- OS grid reference: SZ157968
- Civil parish: Sopley
- District: New Forest
- Shire county: Hampshire
- Region: South East
- Country: England
- Sovereign state: United Kingdom
- Post town: CHRISTCHURCH
- Postcode district: BH23
- Dialling code: 01425
- Police: Hampshire and Isle of Wight
- Fire: Hampshire and Isle of Wight
- Ambulance: South Central
- UK Parliament: New Forest West
- Website: Parish Council

Sopley is a village and civil parish in the New Forest National Park in Hampshire, England. The village lies on the old main road from Christchurch to Ringwood, on the east bank of the River Avon. The parish extends east as far as Thorney Hill and includes the hamlets of Shirley, Avon and Ripley. The area is mainly rural with fewer than 300 dwellings. The population of the parish at the 2021 census was 1,028.

The village is on the fringes of the New Forest, just outside the national park but within the perambulation boundary of the forest. Most of the buildings date from the 19th century but there are more modern houses to the north. It is also home to Moorlands College, one of the largest evangelical theological seminaries in the country, built on the site of the old manor house which was demolished in 1988.

== History ==
There has been settlement in the area since the Bronze Age and it has existed as a manor since before the Norman Conquest. Sopley is listed in the Domesday Book of 1086. Before 1066 it had been held by one Edric, but by 1086 it belonged to William son of Stur. By that time, four hides of the manor and all the woodland had been absorbed into the New Forest. At the end of the 13th century, records are found of two distinct manors of Sopley. One of the manors was for 200 years part of the lands of the Earls of Ormond. The other manor was owned first by the Le Moyne family, and then, like nearby Ibsley, by the Stourton Barons. In the middle of the 16th century, both manors were sold to the Berkeley family, and the two manors became one again.

In 1575, Sir John Berkeley conveyed the manor to William Waller, and it eventually descended to the Tichborne Baronets, being owned by the 2nd and 3rd Baronet, until the 4th Baronet sold the manor to James Willis around 1725. John Willis of Ringwood inherited the manor in 1753, and upon his death in 1779, it passed to his nephew John Compton, and it descended, like Minstead, with the Comptons. The manor house was rebuilt in 1790 by the then owner James Compton. Compton was a sheep farmer who, along with the local vicar, the Reverend Willis, introduced a particular breed of Spanish sheep to the area. The Merino sheep is renowned for its soft, fine, fleece which is still much sought after. Sopley became for a while an important specialist wool producing area.

A mill in Sopley is recorded in the Domesday book, when an annual levy of 10 shillings and 875 eels was imposed. It is disputed whether this is the current mill; certainly parts of it are much younger: a third floor for flour storage was constructed in 1878 and the original undershot wheel was later superseded by a turbine. The mill remained in service until 1946.

The Parish Church of St Michaels and All Angels stands on a high mound overlooking the mill and the River Avon. It has been variously proposed that this high mound may have been the site of an earlier Pagan temple or the base camp of Jute invaders who travelled up the Avon from nearby Christchurch. Parts of the church date from the 11th century but much of it was constructed in the 13th century from rubble ironstone dressed with Binstead stone.

In 1834 the manor house, then known as Sopley Park, was sold to John Kemp-Welch, a wealthy London merchant and owner of the Schweppes company. He in turn sold it in 1885. The house was used as a nursing home and two independent schools at various times during its post-war history, and was demolished in 1988 to make way for a bible college. The house was notable for its three stained glass windows depicting the story of Walter Tirel, spelled locally as Tyrrell. The lodges at either end of the park wall still stand.

RAF Sopley was a Royal Air Force base near the village, built in the early fifties as a domestic camp and used by the MOD until 1974. In the late 1970s and early 1980s it was used to accommodate refugees from Vietnam. The site is now known as Merryfield Park.

Near to the village, bordering Ripley, was a Ground Controlled Interception (GCI) radar station. Its purpose was to detect, locate and track enemy aircraft and provide inland radar coverage for Britain. Initially a mobile station, by 1943 it was a permanent fixture with a rotating aerial array, transmitter equipment in an underground bunker, operations block, emergency back-up power supply and guard hut. In 1946, RAF Sopley was re-classified as a master GCI station and reserve Sector Operations Centre. As part of the UK's programme to update its air defences, Sopley underwent much modernisation during the 1950s including a new guardhouse providing access to a two-storey underground operations centre.

Sopley was also the location of RAF Winkton, an Advanced Landing Ground, which operated during 1944 and returned to agricultural use in 1945.

A one-way system was introduced in 1938 to aid the flow of traffic along the narrow lanes in the village. A 1937 traffic census recorded that within a week, 9,271 vehicles used the main Ringwood to Christchurch road.

== Geography ==
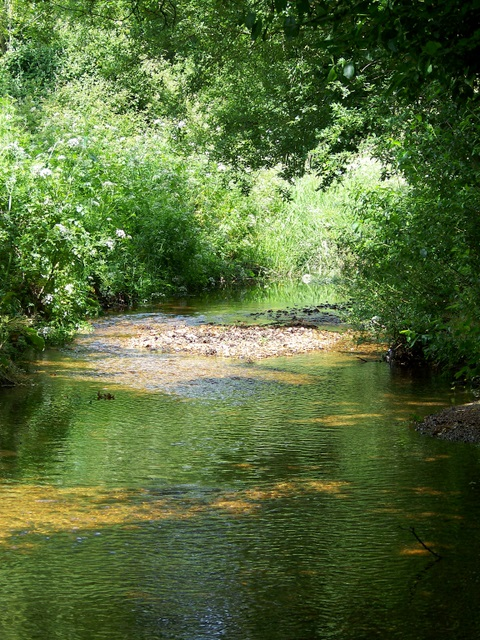
Sopley Brook

The parish of Sopley is in the far southwest corner of Hampshire. on the border of Dorset. some three miles north-northeast of the town of Christchurch. The River Avon and the Dorset parish of Burton run along its western edge, and it extends eastwards into the New Forest as far as Thorney Hill. To the south it borders the parish of Bransgore. It includes the settlements of Sopley, Shirley, Avon, and Ripley.

The parish is mainly rural with fewer than 300 dwellings and narrow lanes. The main Christchurch to Ringwood road passes through the centre of Sopley village where a one-way system helps these narrow byways cope with an often noticeable amount of traffic. A small stream, known locally as Sopley Brook, cuts through the centre of the village and enters the River Avon south of the parish church of St. Michael and All Angels. The surrounding area includes farmland, flood plain, and open forest.

In 1855 a description of the land was given thus: "The arable land is a rich and productive loam and is chiefly what is known as good sheep and barley land. It is in a very high state of cultivation and we have seldom seen over land more even in quality or in better condition".

Much of the parish is within a large conservation area. The meadows to the west of the village are part of the River Avon flood plain and designated as a Site of Special Scientific Interest.

== Demography ==
Age Distribution in the Parish of Sopley
Years	Count	%
0–4	31	4.01
5–15	98	12.66
16–24	89	11.49
25–44	216	27.91
45–64	201	25.97
65–74	80	10.34
75+	59	7.62

The 2001 census recorded the population of the parish as 774, of which 415 were male and 359 female. There were 274 households, giving an average of just under 2.82 people per household. All but two households identified themselves as being of white ethnicity (99.3%).

Of the 645 residents over 16 years of age, 201 said they were single, 359 married and 85 either divorced or widowed. The mean age of the population was 40.78, the median 41.00. The majority of those living in the parish were of working age: 65.37% were aged between 16 and 65.

There were 284 dwellings in the parish, of which 274 were lived in. Of these, 162 were occupied by the owner, 15 were social housing and 97 rented privately. A vast majority of households (226) had central heating and sole use of a bath or shower and toilet. Six dwellings were vacant and four were second homes or holiday accommodation.

Of the 586 residents in the 16–74 years age bracket, 353 were employed, 10 were unemployed and 205 economically inactive. Of the 353 who were employed, 208 were male and 145 female. The males worked a mean average of 43.68 hours a week and females 29.38. 31% of 16- to 74-year-olds had a grade 3 qualification or above, while 43.5% had no formal qualifications or a grade 1 qualification or below.

== Historic estates ==
=== Avon Tyrrell ===
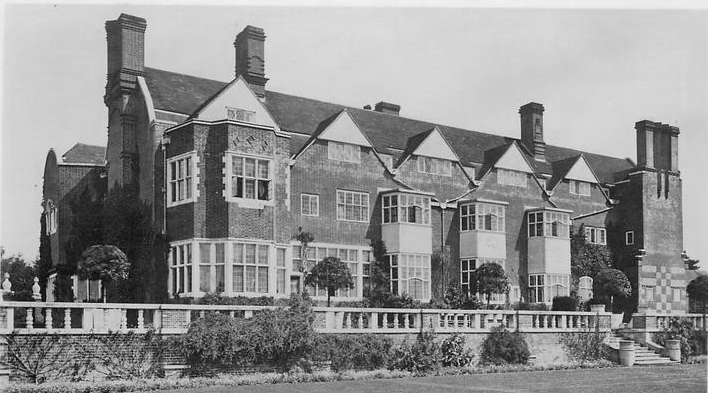
Avon Tyrrell House in 1910. It was built in 1891.

Avon Tyrrell is a historic manor within the parish of Sopley. Immediately after the Norman Conquest of 1066 the manor of Avon, in the New Forest, a royal hunting forest, was held by the Tyrell family. Whilst hunting in the New Forest in 1100 King William II (1087–1100) was accidentally killed by an arrow shot by Walter III Tyrrell, who fled fearing being accused of murder and regicide, and crossed the River Avon at a ford still known as Tyrrell's Ford. members of this family included:

- Sir John Tyrrell (c.1382–1437) of Heron in the parish of East Horndon, Essex, Knight of the Shire for Essex, Speaker of the House of Commons, and Treasurer of the Royal Household.

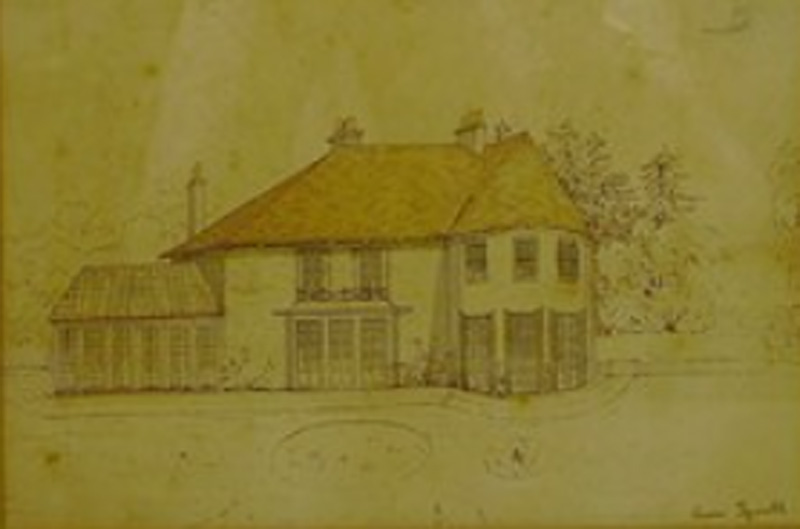
The former "Avon Tyrrell" Manor, owned by the Fane family, which is now the Tyrrells Ford Country Inn and Hotel. Drawing by Lt Col. Henry Hamlyn-Fane in 1850.

In 1602 the manor of Avon Tyrrell was sold by his descendant John Tyrrell to Bennett Wynchecombe and Giles Tooker, who sold it to Sir John Webb, 1st Baronet (d.1680), of Odstock, Wiltshire (created a baronet in 1644), son of Sir John Webb, knight, of Odstock and of Great Canford, Dorset, by his second wife Catharine Tresham, daughter of Sir Thomas Tresham, of Rushton, Northamptonshire. His descendant Sir John Webb, 5th Baronet (d.1797) sold it to Edward Buckley Batson, a banker, and Stanlake Batson. The heir of Stanlake Batson was his sister Anne Batson, wife of Henry Fane (1739–1802), MP, of Fulbeck Hall, Lincolnshire, the second son of Thomas Fane, 8th Earl of Westmorland (1701–1771). Avon Tyrrell was inherited by her second son Rev. Edward Fane, and passed to his eldest son Lt Col. Henry Hamlyn-Fane (1817–1868), whose mural monument is in Clovelly Church, who married Susan Hester Hamlyn-Williams, the heiress of Clovelly in Devon, and who adopted the additional surname "Hamlyn". In 1850 Lt Col Henry Hamlyn-Fane drew a picture of the then Avon Tyrrell Manor which is now Tyrrells Ford Country Inn and Hotel in Avon.

In 1912 Avon Tyrrell was the property of one of his daughters Miss Eveline Harriet Hamlyn-Fane, and passed to Eveline's sister Constance Hamlyn-Fane, wife of John Manners-Sutton, 3rd Baron Manners (1852–1927). Lady Manner's childless sister Christine Hamlyn had inherited Clovelly, and had intended to bequeath it to her eldest niece Mary Christine Manners, who unexpectedly died at the age of 17. She thus left it instead to Mary's younger sister Betty Constance Manners, wife of Arthur Asquith, 3rd son of the Prime Minister H. H. Asquith (1852–1928). The 3rd Baron Manners won the 1882 Grand National as owner, trainer and rider of his horse Seaman, for which triple feat he won a large sum from a wager, and in 1891 used the proceeds to rebuild Avon Tyrrell House, to the design of the architect W. R. Lethaby. The house is now a grade I listed building and considered to be one of the archetypal Arts & Crafts buildings. His eldest son Francis Manners, 4th Baron Manners (1897–1972) inherited Avon Tyrrell. It was requisitioned by the government during World War II and the family decided not to return to it after the war (in 1968 the residence of the 4th Baron was nearby Tyrrell's Ford, Christchurch, Hampshire). In 1949 it was donated by the 4th Baron to a charitable trust, the National Association of Girls' Clubs and Mixed Clubs. In 2014 it was still in use as the headquarters of UK Youth, a national youth work charity and activity centre.

== Notable buildings ==
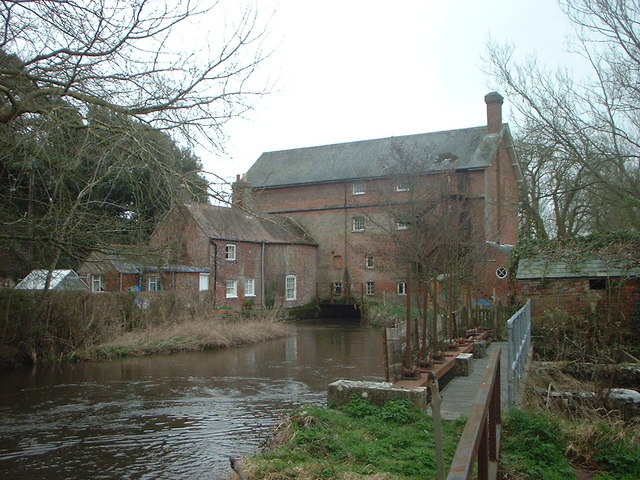
The Grade II listed mill

Much of the parish is within a conservation area and most of the buildings date back to the 19th century, although there are more modern houses to the north of the village. There are many thatched cottages and some timber-framed buildings. There are two Grade I, one Grade II* and 35 Grade II listed structures including Sopley Mill, both Sopley Park lodges, The Woolpack Inn and The Old Blacksmith's Shop.

The Woolpack Inn sits in the centre of the one-way system in the middle of the village. It was built as a cottage with a wool store in 1725 but has served as a public house since 1783. Built in brick with a thatched roof, it was designated as Grade II listed in 1986.

The Parish Church of St Michaels and All Angels, a Grade II* listed building, occupies a prominent position overlooking the Avon on the site of an old Saxon church. It is constructed from ironstone rubble dressed with Binstead stone from the Isle of Wight, and has stepped buttresses and lancet doors and windows. It was endowed by Earl Godwin in 1050.
