= James Octavius Machell =

British horse racing figure

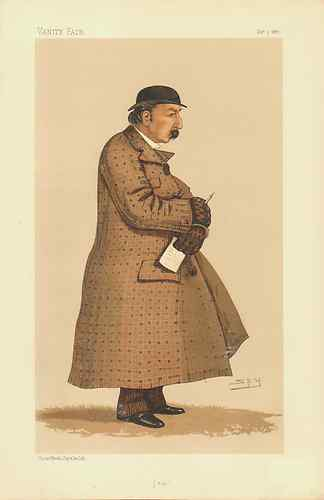
Caricature of Machell by Leslie Ward in the 3 December 1887 issue of Vanity Fair

Captain James Octavius Machell (1837–1902) was an influential figure in British horse racing during the final decades of the 19th century. He was a respected judge of horses and an astute and highly successful gambler. During a career that lasted almost forty years he managed and trained eleven English classic winners and was himself the owner of a record three Grand National winners.

== Early life ==
James Machell was born at Etton Rectory near Beverley on 5 December 1837, the youngest child of the Reverend Robert and Eliza Machell. He attended Rossall School near Fleetwood Lancashire from 1846 to 1854. In 1857 he joined the army and was posted to India, becoming involved with the suppression of the Indian mutiny. His regiment returned home to be quartered on The Curragh in Ireland where Machell spent the next seven years. During this period he participated in horse racing and in 1862 became the leading owner in Ireland. The same year he was promoted from Lieutenant to Captain by purchase on 29 July.

When his army life and racing started to conflict, he resigned his commission and took stables in Kennet near Newmarket, Suffolk with a small string of horses. He would bring off a betting coup at the 1864 Newmarket spring meeting with Bacchus, a horse he had owned and run in Ireland. The funds from this and further wins enabled Machell to purchase Bedford Cottage stables in Newmarket. Here he employed George Bloss to act as trainer, whilst he retained strategic control and management of the horses and stables. Later trainers were Joe Cannon and James Jewitt. In 1884 he purchased the adjacent Bedford Lodge stables and leased these to George Alexander Baird. Machell was aware of the potential for Irish-bred horses and many of his future successes would come from Irish yearlings sent to him by Charles Blake of Heath House Stables, Maryborough (Portlaoise).

Machell was a good athlete when young and during his army days would make wagers on his ability to perform feats of strength and agility. When he moved to Newmarket in 1864 he beat the local running champion in a 100 yards sprint.

== Career achievements ==
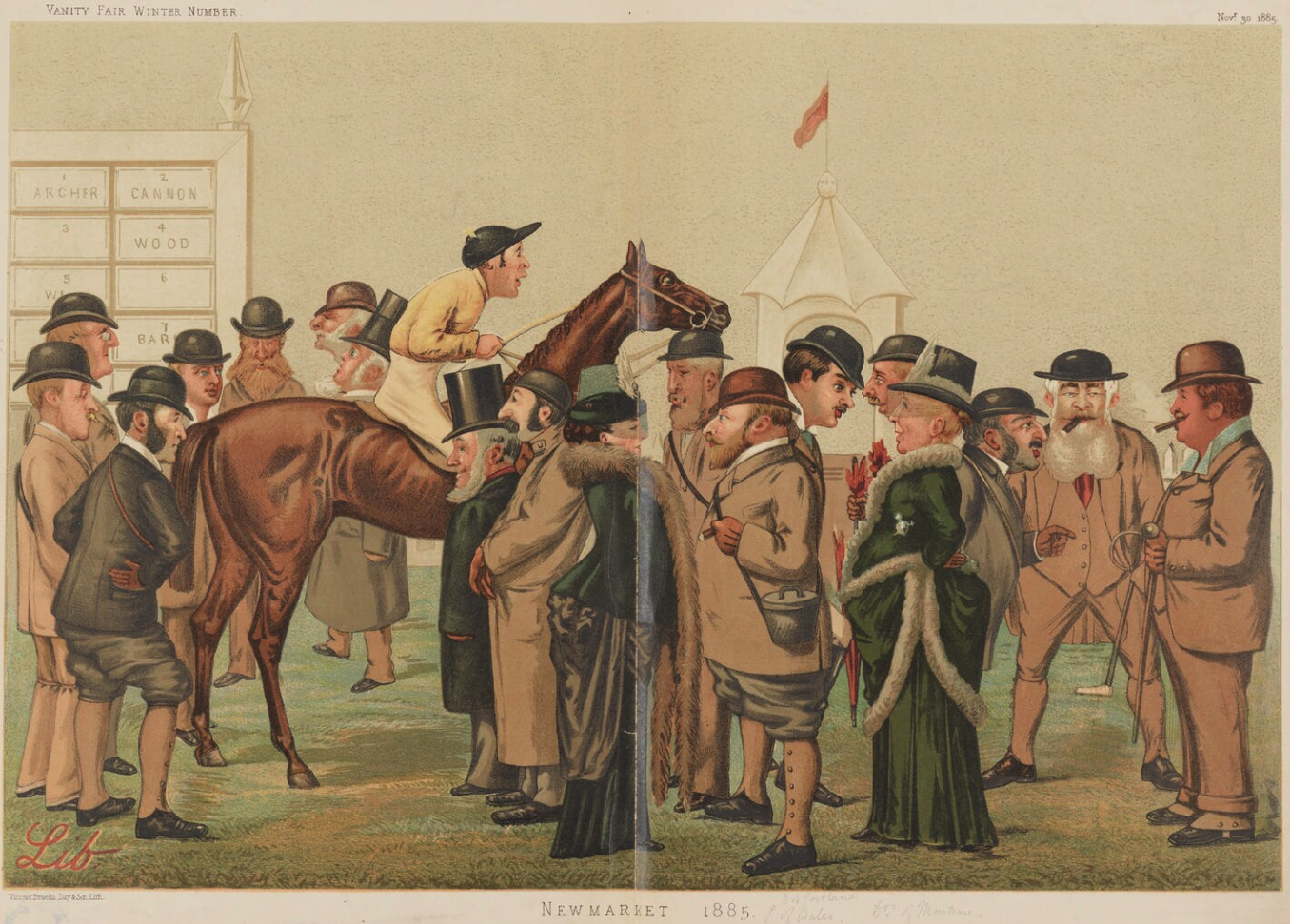
"Newmarket 1885"

During his career Machell won 11 English Classic races for his clients plus other major races including four Ascot Gold Cups and five Stewards' Cups at Goodwood as well as the four Grand Nationals at Aintree and the Scottish Grand National. His patrons included Lord Henry Chaplin, Sir George Chetwynd, the Duke of Devonshire, Lord Calthorpe, Sir Charles Legard, the third and fourth Earls of Lonsdale, Colonel Owen Williams, Captain Prime, Lord Hastings, Lord Gerard, the Duke of Beaufort, Lord Strathnairn, Lord Aylesford, Mr C. J. Blake, Lord Rodney and Colonel Harry McCalmont. Some of the great horses he managed were Hermit, Petronel, Belphoebe, Pilgrimage, Seabreeze, Harvester, Kilwarlin and the triple crown winner, Isinglass.

=== Epsom Derby ===
In 1865 Machell became the racing manager for Henry Chaplin. Machell had three of Chaplin's horses - Breadalbane, Broomielaw and Hermit - transferred to Bedford Cottage from William Goater’s yard in Findon, West Sussex. Hermit was entered for the 1867 Epsom Derby but suffered severe bleeding from the nose during training and it appeared unlikely he would be fit enough to run. However, he responded well to treatment and recovered in time to race, going on to take the Derby and make considerable money for the connections. This was to be the first of three Derby wins for the Machell stables, the others being Harvester (1884) and Isinglass (1893). Harvester's win was a dead heat with St. Gatien.

=== Grand National ===
Machell had a good eye for steeplechasers and he became the most successful owner in the history of The Grand National with three winners: Disturbance (1873), Reugny (1874) and Regal (1876). The first two were ridden and trained by John Maunsell Richardson at Limba Magna who rode as an amateur (gentleman rider). Richardson, who had previously won the 1871 Scottish Grand National for Machell, became unhappy with Machell’s attempts to influence the betting market and parted company with him. Machell moved his jumpers to Joe Cannon at Kentford. Cannon would ride Regal to victory in the 1876 National. A further National win was secured for owner John Manners-Sutton, 3rd Baron Manners who had wagered that he could buy and ride the winner of the 1882 Grand National with just a few months preparation. The horse he chose was Seaman, purchased in Ireland and trained on by Machell and Jimmy Jewitt. The race - run in a snow storm - was won by Seaman even though he sustained an injury at the final fence.

=== Gambling ===
Machell was renowned for making large and often successful wagers and for manipulating the betting market in his favour. John Maunsell Richardson had been so "disgusted with the sordid nature" of Machell's manipulation that he withdrew from public riding after his 1874 Grand National win on Reugny. His experience was not unique, in Turf Memories of Sixty Years, Alexander Scott provides other examples of how Machell would use questionable tactics, and Lillie Langtry in her memoirs relates stories told to her by Machell about money making schemes connected with selling plate races.

== Final years ==
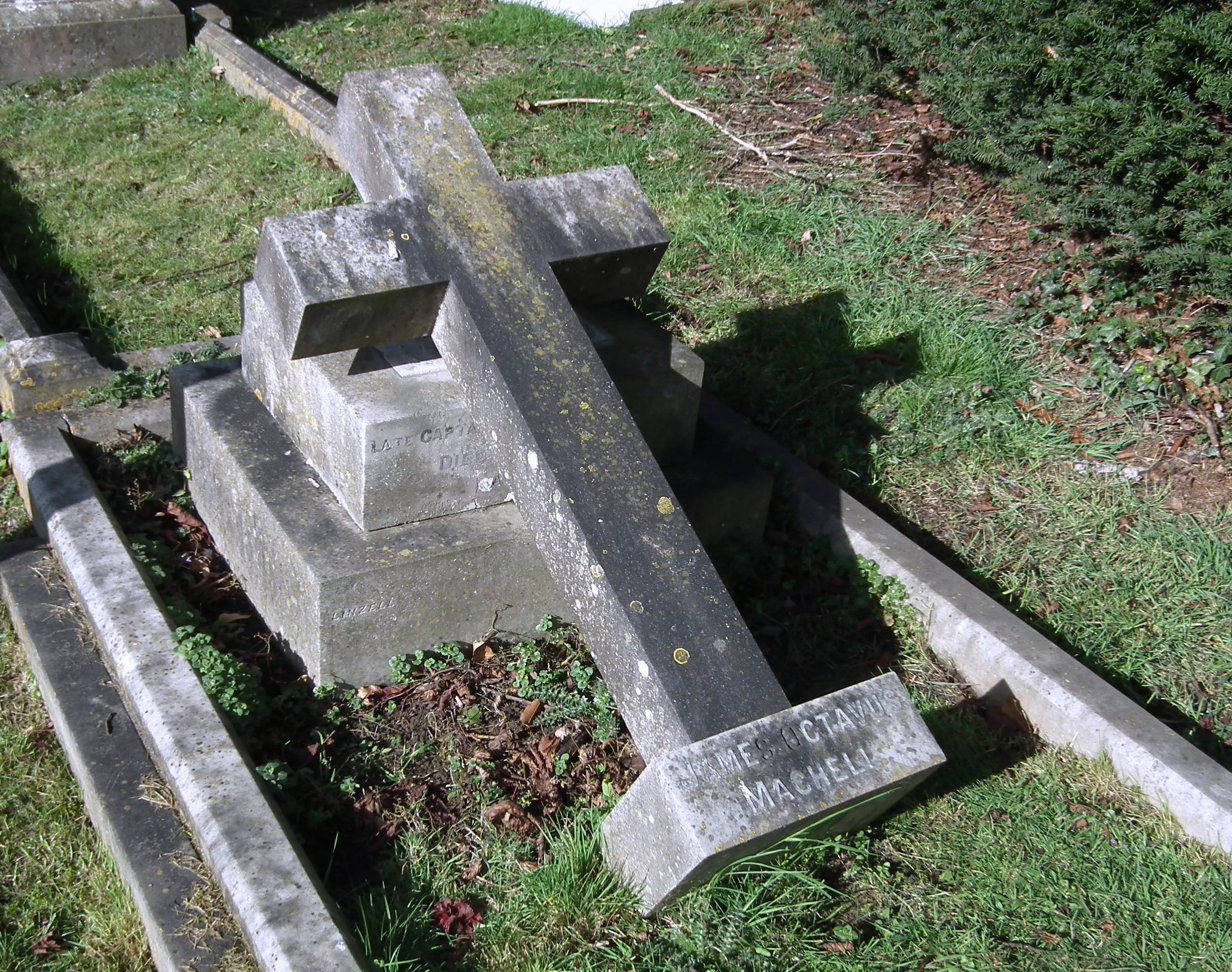
The grave of James Octavus Machell (1837 – 1902) Newmarket, Suffolk, England

In 1887 Machell lost his friend jockey Fred Archer who died from a self-inflicted gunshot wound. Machell had been angry with Archer when they last met and he suffered guilt and remorse for months after the death. In the 1890s Machell's health began to fail him and in 1893 he suffered a breakdown. In 1896 he relinquished his interest in the Gatwick Racecourse (he had joined the syndicate in 1890). When his friend and trainer, James Jewitt, died in 1899, he sold the Bedford Cottage stables to Harry McCalmont, wealthy owner of Isinglass. He retained some horses at his Chetwynd House stables, trained by George Chaloner, and continued to run horses in Ireland.

Lillie Langtry related visits from Captain Machell to her Regal Lodge residence in Kentford, where they were neighbours. This was after 1895 when Langtry first owned the house. She says Machell taught her much about the sport, but horses and racing filled his mind to obsession, his literature consisted of sporting papers and he passed a good part of his time making imaginary handicaps. He carried a little book in his waistcoat pocket that contained details and values of all his assets, including his horses.

Captain James Octavius Machell died on 11 May 1902 in Hastings and was buried in Newmarket.

- Chetwynd House, constructed for jockey Charles Wood and later purchased by Machell is now called Machell Place.

== Crackenthorpe Hall ==
Crackenthorpe Hall in Cumbria had been the ancestral home of the Machell family for five centuries but was sold to Lord Lonsdale in 1786. In 1877 Captain Machell bought back the Hall, restoring and adding to it. Machell, who never married, left the hall to his nephew Percy Machell who was killed at the Battle of the Somme in July 1916. His wife, Lady Valda Machell, daughter of Prince Victor of Hohenlohe-Langenburg, continued to live at the Hall until about 1928.

== Sources ==
- Moorhouse, Edward (1912). "Machell, James Octavius" . In Lee, Sidney (ed.). Dictionary of National Biography (2nd supplement). London: Smith, Elder & Co.
- Edward Moorhouse, rev. Wray Vamplew. "Machell, James Octavius (1837–1902)". Oxford Dictionary of National Biography (online ed.). Oxford University Press. doi:10.1093/ref:odnb/34732. (Subscription or UK public library membership required.)
