= All Saints' Church, Thorney Hill =

Church in Thorney Hill, Hampshire, England

All Saints' Church
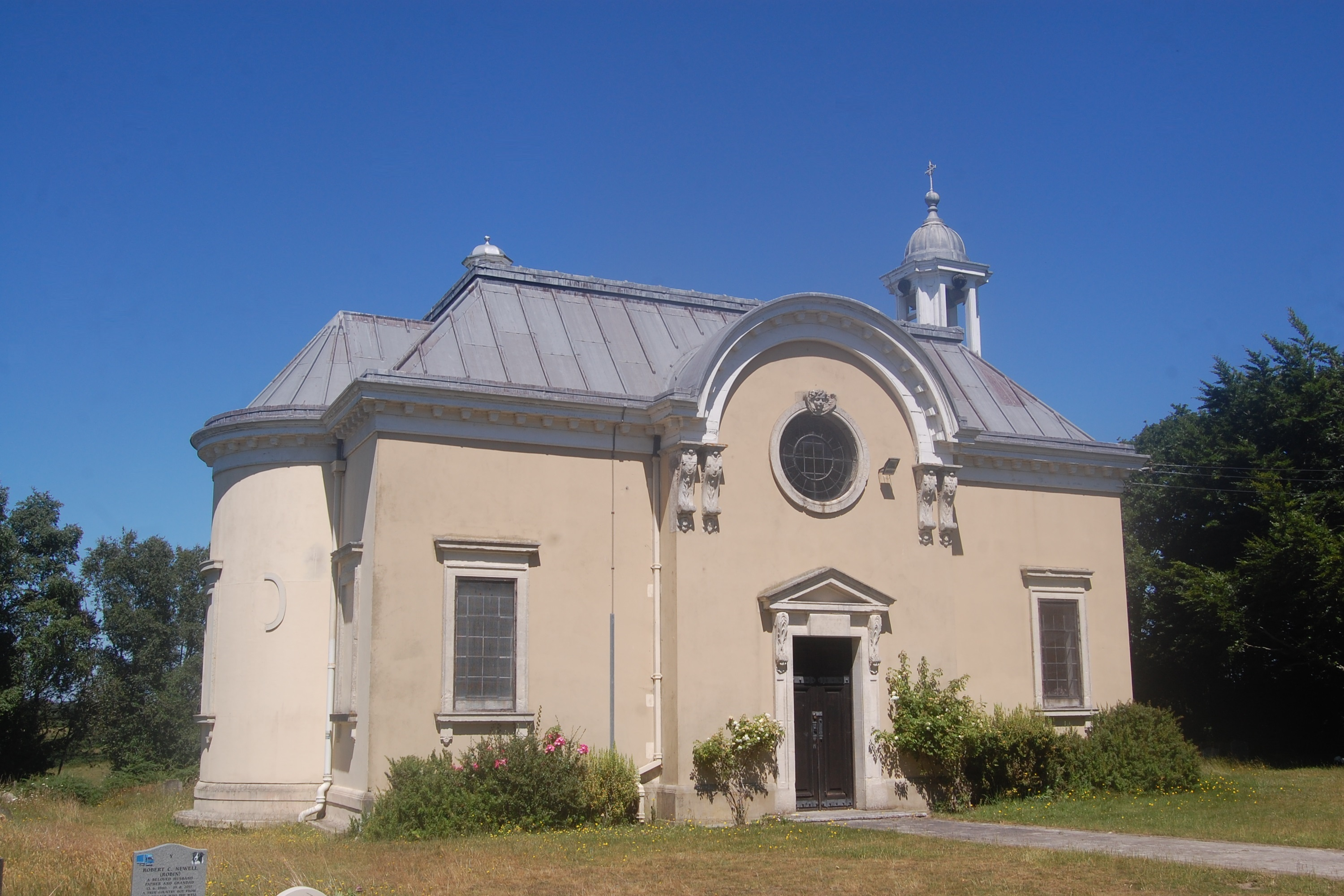
- All Saints' Church

Religion
- Affiliation: Church of England
- Ecclesiastical or organizational status: Active
- Year consecrated: 1906

Location
- Location: Thorney Hill, Hampshire, England
- Interactive map of All Saints' Church
- Coordinates: 50°47′48″N 1°43′18″W

Architecture
- Architect: Detmar Blow
- Type: Church
- Style: Baroque

Listed Building – Grade I
- Official name: Church of All Saints
- Designated: 24 September 1985
- Reference no.: 1302198

All Saints' Church is a Church of England church in Thorney Hill, Hampshire, England. It was built in 1905–06 and has been a Grade I listed building since 1985. A World War I memorial in the churchyard is also Grade II listed.

== History ==
All Saints' Church was built at the expense of Lord and Lady Manners as a memorial church to their daughter, Mary Christine, who died of cholera in 1904 during a visit to India. The church served their nearby Avon Tyrrell estate. Designed by the architect Detmar Blow, the foundation stone of the church was laid on 9 October 1905 by Lady Manners and it was built by Messrs Newton of Hitchin, Hertfordshire.

The church was dedicated by the Bishop of Winchester, Herbert Edward Ryle, on 17 October 1906, and the church then began serving the population of Thorney Hill, Bransgore and other localities. A special service was held on 8 October 2006 by the Bishop of Winchester, Michael Scott-Joynt, to commemorate the church's centenary.

== Architecture ==
All Saints', described by Historic England as a "remarkable Edwardian Baroque church", is built of Caen stone and rendered brick. The aluminum roof features a cupola on the western side. The church was designed to seat approximately 100 persons. Notable features of the interior include a bronze effigy of the Manners' son, John, killed in action in 1914, a mural painted in 1922 by Phoebe Anna Traquair in memory of Lady Manners, who died in 1920 and work by Eric Gill.
