= Ambition (charity) =

British youth services charity

- Formation: 1925
- Legal status: Charity
- Headquarters: London
- Location: United Kingdom
- Key people: Helen Marshall (chief executive)
- Website: http://www.ambitionuk.org

Ambition (formerly known as Clubs for Young People) is a registered charity whose members are youth organisations in cities, counties and countries throughout the UK. Through its network, Ambition works with more than 3,500 organisations, supporting over 350,000 young people. In 2017, it merged with the charity UK Youth. Ambition works directly with its member organisations to help facilitate the delivery of quality of youth services, and also influences national and local government to support youth clubs. The current Chief Executive is Marie Hammer.

== Purpose and charitable objective ==
Ambition is a major voluntary youth organisation in the UK, promoting the importance of quality youth clubs.

== History ==
Ambition was founded on 24 October 1925 as the National Association of Boys' Clubs (NABC) in order to consolidate the Boys' and Lads' Club movement which had been growing steadily since the latter quarter of the 19th century. At the time the vast majority of boys left formal education at the age of 14 and began life in employment. To many boys the street was the only place available to socialize once they had finished work, which became seen as a social problem. The boys' club movement therefore aimed to provide these working class boys with a place to socialize and have access to positive activities in their leisure time.

Once founded, the NABC grew rapidly. Within a year, five local federations were affiliated bringing 262 boys' clubs with them while an additional thirty-three clubs were affiliated directly with the NABC. By 1928, fifteen local federations with 715 clubs had affiliated with 71 further clubs joining directly and by 1930, 17 federations were affiliated and 944 clubs, 107 of which were directly. More than half of the federations which were affiliated by 1930 had not previously existed.

At the 1930 NABC conference, the Principles and Aims of the Boys Club Movement was accepted by the organization as the official doctrine of the Boys' Club movement and popularly became known as "the NABC Bible". The document set out the purpose, programme, policy and philosophy of the National Association.

National Association of Boys' Clubs continued through the Second World War and contributed towards the war effort. During the war, many boys' clubs had to alter the practices and the activities they provided. Many helped the war effort with new activities such as cultivating fallow ground, providing canteens for local soldiers, digging shelters and helping evacuated school children. Many youth clubs opened their premises as makeshift schools during the day. Boys clubs' also helped children evacuated from the cities during the war to settle into their new homes and make friends.

In 1992, NABC officially changed its name to NABC-Clubs for Young People, to reflect that its clubs were no longer just for boys. In 1999, this changed again to the National Association of Clubs for Young People and in 2005 to Clubs for Young People. In 2012, the charity's name became Ambition.

== Network structure ==
Ambition's network consists of community-based member clubs who work with young people directly, and city and county organizations that provide locally tailored support to youth clubs and projects on a daily basis. Its national office, as well as providing national representation, advocacy and resources, offers specialist capacity-building through regional teams. Its regional teams are split into two geographical areas, north and south. Working within Ambition's network are an estimated 30,000 volunteers, within 3,500 youth clubs that help over 350,000 young people.

== Areas of work ==
Healthy Lifestyles

The healthy lifestyles programme focuses on the role youth clubs can play in the promotion of good physical, mental and environmental health. The sports programme, which tries to foster greater participation of girls, covers a range of sports including table tennis, football and boxing. Since the late 1940s, Ambition has coordinated an annual 5-a-side football tournament involving its member clubs. The tournament was previously sponsored by Gillette in one of the longest running charity and corporate partnerships. The charity also runs and annual boxing championship.

Ambition’s Somewhere to Talk – Someone to Listen project, led by Young Devon, aimed to enhance the supported youth clubs provide to the mental health and wellbeing of children and young people who access their services.

Creative Arts

The creative arts programme increases the opportunities for young people to access the arts through media which include music and photography. In 2011, Ambition ran the Bigger Picture photography competition. Young photographers entered with pictures showing life at their book club or what life might look like without youth clubs. The competition was judged by photographers Rankin and Paul Sanders, and then picture editor at The Times, Rory Linsdsay. It was run in partnership with UK Youth and supported by Nokia.

Enterprise

The Enterprising Ambition programme helps young people built up their skills to kind work and set up a business. Funded through the RBS Inspiring Enterprise Initiative, the programme was piloted from January 2012 before being rolled out nationally. The programme is supported by Young Apprentice finalist Lizzie Magee.

Ambition supports the annual PhoneBrain competition, run by Ambition's partner PhonepayPlus.

Leadership and Training

Ambition’s Leadership programme provides training for aspiring and experienced young leaders. They support and deliver courses that help young people gain leadership qualifications.

Ambition is part of a consortium, led by Catch22, helping to run the National Citizen Service (NCS). As part of the consortium, Ambition has helped over 1,500 young people complete their NCS.

In October 2012, Ambition began pioneering the Lions Quest Skills for Adolescence scheme in the UK.

Ambition Quality

Ambition developed a standard to judge the quality of youth service based on the experiences if Ambition, London Youth and Youth options.

Ambition Quality is aimed specifically at youth clubs, projects and sports clubs who can achieve a Bronze, Silver or Gold Award. Designed specifically for youth infrastructure organizations, Ambition Quality has two standards: excellence practice for membership organizations and excellence practice in supporting other youth organizations.

== Notable associated people ==
Prince Henry, Duke of Gloucester – Became president of the NABC a year into its life in 1926. The Duke was not merely a figurehead but was active in his work for clubs.

Prince Richard, Duke of Gloucester – Prince Henry's son, who has been Ambition's President since his father's death in 1974.

Clement Attlee – Was a youth club leader in the East End of London for fourteen years before going into politics. Following his political retirement Attlee became a vice-president of the NABC and remained an active supporter throughout his life.

Frankie Vaughan - Vaughn was a member of the Lancaster Lads' Club in his youth and throughout his life and career was an enthusiastic supporter of the NABC, visiting clubs around the country and donating the proceeds from one of his songs every year.

Roger Bannister – The first man to run a mile in under four minutes was an active NABC supporter and used his medical expertise as chairman of an NABC technical panel advising on physical recreation and health.

A number of sports men and women were in their youth members of clubs affiliated to Ambition including: Jason Robinson, Ellen MacArthur, Alan Shearer, Amir Kahn, Peter Beardsley, Steve Bruce and Michael Carrick, Ravi Bopara.
