= John Neville Manners =

English cricketer (1892–1914)

John Neville Manners (6 January 1892 – 1 September 1914) played cricket for Eton College in Fowler's match in 1910, and died in the early weeks of the First World War on the retreat from Mons. Poem LIV of The Muse in Arms by William Grenfell (brother of Julian Grenfell) is addressed to him and entitled "To John".

== Life ==
The eldest son of John Manners-Sutton, 3rd Baron Manners, Manners was educated at Eton, played cricket in the Eton v Harrow match in 1910, and then studied at Balliol College, Oxford.

In 1912, Manners was commissioned as an officer into the second battalion of the Grenadier Guards. In August 1914, he was sent to Belgium with the British Expeditionary Force and on 1 September was killed in a rear-guard action in the forests around Villers-Cotterêts. His platoon, in No. 4 Company, was part of the defensive force from the 4th (Guards) Brigade covering the retirement of the 2nd Infantry Division on the retreat from Mons. His platoon and a second platoon did not receive the order to retire and were cut off. Lieutenants Manners and George Edward Cecil and around 160 guardsmen were killed. The body of Manners was never identified. A letter from Rudyard Kipling to Lady Edward Cecil records a conversation at Gatcombe House in December 1914 with the convalescent Private Walter Titcombe, who had served in Manners's platoon and claimed that Manners was shot through the head and died instantly.

Memorial to Lieutenant J. Manners at Clovelly, Devon

Manners is commemorated at the La Ferté-sous-Jouarre memorial on the south bank of the River Marne in France. A bronze effigy of Manners by Sir Bertram Mackennal is at All Saints Chapel, Thorney Hill, with lettering for the memorial cut by Eric Gill. The baroque chapel had been built in 1906 to a design by Detmar Blow to commemorate the death of Manners' sister Christine. Manners is also commemorated at Mount Pleasant, Clovelly, on land that was donated to the National Trust by his aunt Christine Hamlyn.

As the first son of a peer, his name is recorded on the wooden panels of the war memorial in the Royal Gallery at the House of Lords.

== Family ==
Manners was the fourth child and eldest son of John Thomas Manners-Sutton, 3rd Baron Manners. His father was educated at Eton and Trinity College, Cambridge, and served as a lieutenant in the Grenadier Guards between 1857 and 1883, and later as a captain in 3rd Battalion of the Hampshire Regiment. His father was married at Clovelly on 12 August 1885, to Constance Edwina Adeline Hamlyn-Fane; she was the daughter of Henry Edward Hamlyn-Fane and Susan Hester Hamlyn-William. Their family home was at Avon Tyrrell in the New Forest in Hampshire. It is not clear when the family dropped the Sutton surname.

Manners had three elder sisters, Mary Christine (1886-1904), and twins Angela Margaret (1889- 1970) and Betty Constance (1889-1962). His eldest sister Christine died aged 17 in Bangalore; the others married (respectively) Arthur Melland Asquith, son of H. H. Asquith, and Christian Malise Hore-Ruthven, son of Walter James Hore-Ruthven, 9th Lord Ruthven of Freeland.

His younger brother Francis Henry (1897-1972) was also educated at Eton, and then at Trinity College, Cambridge. Francis also served in the Grenadier Guards in the First World War. He survived, winning the Military Cross, and succeeded their father as 4th Baron Manners, later serving as lieutenant colonel of the 5th/7th Battalion of the Hampshire Regiment and becoming a Deputy Lieutenant of Hampshire in 1939.
