= Avon Tyrrell House =

Historic manor within the parish of Sopley, Hampshire

Coordinates: 50.8016°N 1.7385°W

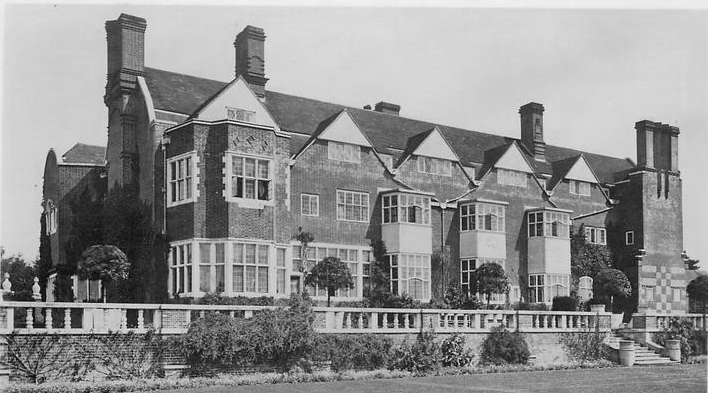
Avon Tyrrell House in 1910

Avon Tyrrell is an historic manor within the parish of Sopley, Hampshire. It is situated within the New Forest, near Christchurch. The present manor house was built in 1891 by John Manners-Sutton, 3rd Baron Manners (1852–1927).

Avon Tyrrell was built as a calendar house with 365 windows (representing the days), 52 rooms (weeks), 12 chimneys (months), 7 external doors (days per week), and 4 wings (seasons).

== History ==
At some time after the Norman Conquest of 1066 and after the compilation of the Domesday Book of 1086, the manor of Avon, in the New Forest, a royal hunting forest, was held by the Peverell family, which held it until the mid-14th century. In 1363 Sir Henry Peverell died seised of the nearby manor of Milton, leaving a son and heir Thomas Peverell, who in 1365 granted it to Sir Thomas Tyrrell. Thenceforth, Avon and Milton descended in the Tyrrell family. Members of this family included: Sir John Tyrrell (c. 1382–1437) of Heron in the parish of East Horndon, Essex, Knight of the Shire for Essex, Speaker of the House of Commons, and Treasurer of the Royal Household. Although the Tyrrell family was not connected with the manor until the mid-14th century, legend has connected the name with the 11th century Norman Walter Tirel, who in 1100 in the New Forest accidentally shot dead with an arrow King William II (1087–1100). The legend states that Tirel fled, fearing being accused of murder and regicide, and crossed the River Avon at a ford in this location, known as Tyrrell's Ford.

In 1602 the manor of Avon Tyrrell was sold by his descendant John Tyrrell to Bennett Wynchecombe and Giles Tooker, who sold it to Sir John Webb, 1st Baronet (d. 1680), of Odstock, Wiltshire (created a baronet in 1644), son of Sir John Webb, knight, of Odstock and of Great Canford, Dorset, by his second wife Catharine Tresham, daughter of Sir Thomas Tresham, of Rushton, Northamptonshire. His descendant Sir John Webb, 5th Baronet (d. 1797) sold it to Edward Buckley Batson, a banker, and Stanlake Batson. The heir of Stanlake Batson was his sister Anne Batson, wife of Henry Fane (1739-1802), of Fulbeck Hall, Lincolnshire, the second son of Thomas Fane, 8th Earl of Westmorland (1701–1771). Avon Tyrrell was inherited by her second son, the Rev. Edward Fane, and passed to his eldest son Henry Hamlyn-Fane (1817–1868), whose mural monument is in Clovelly Church, who married Susan Hester Hamlyn-Williams, the heiress of Clovelly in Devon, then adopted the additional surname "Hamlyn". in 1912, Avon Tyrrell was the property of one of his daughters, Miss Eveline Harriet Hamlyn-Fane, and on her death passed to her sister Constance Hamlyn-Fane, wife of John Manners-Sutton, 3rd Baron Manners (1852–1927). Lady Manners’s childless sister Christine Hamlyn had inherited Clovelly, and had intended to bequeath it to her eldest niece Mary Christine Manners, who unexpectedly died at the age of 17. She thus left it instead to Mary's younger sister Betty Constance Manners, wife of Arthur Asquith, third son of the Prime Minister H. H. Asquith (1852–1928). The 3rd Baron Manners won the 1882 Grand National as owner, trainer, and rider of his horse Seaman, for which triple feat he won a large sum from a wager, and in 1891 used the proceeds to rebuild Avon Tyrrell House, to the design of the architect W. R. Lethaby. The house is now a Grade I listed building considered to be "one of the archetypal Arts & Crafts buildings". His eldest son Francis Manners, 4th Baron Manners (1897–1972) inherited Avon Tyrrell. It was requisitioned by the government during World War II and the family decided not to return to it after the war. In 1968 the residence of Francis Manners, 4th Baron Manners, was nearby Tyrrell's Ford, Christchurch, Hampshire.

== Youth centre ==
In 1949 Francis Manners, 4th Baron Manners gave the house, but not the estate, to a charitable trust, the "National Association of Girls' Clubs and Mixed Clubs". The new holiday centre for young people at the manor house was officially opened by then-Princess Elizabeth (the future Elizabeth II) in a ceremony held in July of that year. In 1964 Avon Tyrell was in use a holiday camp for of National Association of Youth Clubs.* In 2014 the house was still in use as the headquarters of UK Youth, a national youth work charity and activity centre, with a new boathouse being opened on the site for the use of children and teenagers visiting the site in the same year based on plans originally drawn up in 1891. In December 2023 the house was the site of a small fire started by a teenager. In August 2024 the construction of a sports facility was approved at the site, according to the planning application for the facility 39,000 visitors annually were using Avon Tyrell. An appeal was launched to fund the restoration of the house in the same year.
