= Baron Manners =

Barony in the Peerage of the United Kingdom

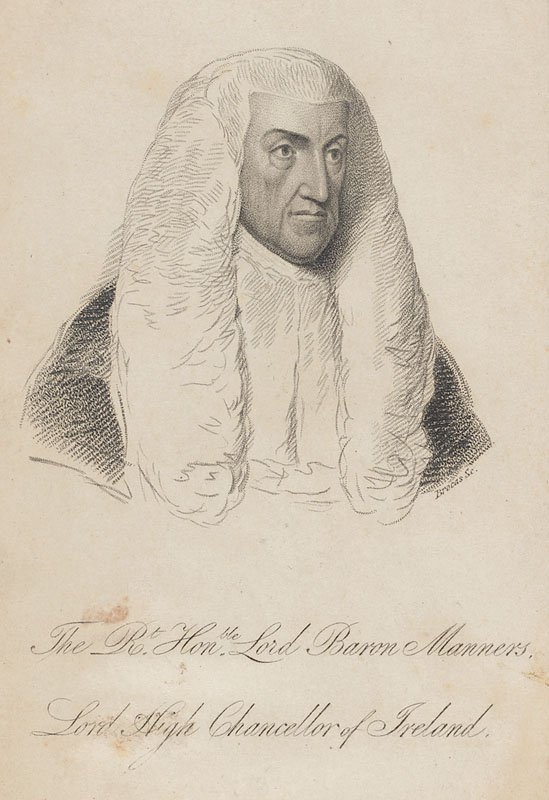
Thomas Manners-Sutton, 1st Baron Manners

Baron Manners, of Foston in the County of Lincoln, is a title in the Peerage of the United Kingdom. It was created in 1807 for the lawyer and politician Sir Thomas Manners-Sutton. He served as Solicitor General from 1802 to 1805 and as Lord Chancellor of Ireland from 1807 to 1827. Manners-Sutton was the fifth son of Lord George Manners-Sutton, third son of John Manners, 3rd Duke of Rutland. His elder brother Charles Manners-Sutton was Archbishop of Canterbury from 1805 to 1828 and the father of Charles Manners-Sutton, 1st Viscount Canterbury, Speaker of the House of Commons from 1817 to 1834. The first Baron's great-grandson, the fourth Baron, assumed the surname of Manners only. As of 2010 the title is held by the latter's grandson, the sixth Baron, who succeeded his father in 2008.

== Barons Manners (1807–present) ==
- Thomas Manners-Sutton, 1st Baron Manners (1756–1842)
  - John Manners-Sutton, 2nd Baron Manners (1818–1864)
    - John Manners-Sutton, 3rd Baron Manners (1852–1927)
      - Hon. John Neville Manners (1892–1914)
      - Francis Manners, 4th Baron Manners (1897–1972)
        - John Robert Cecil Manners, 5th Baron Manners (1923–2008)
          - John Hugh Robert Manners, 6th Baron Manners (b. 1956)
            - (1) Hon. John Alexander David Manners (b. 2011)
        - Hon. Richard Neville Manners (1924–2009)
          - (2) Edward Preston Manners (b. 1948)
          - (3) Rupert Francis Henry Manners (b. 1950)
            - (4) Stephen Francis Manners (b. 1978)
            - (5) Philip Henry Manners (b. 1979)
          - (6) Thomas Benjamin Cabbell Manners (b. 1954)
            - (7) Rupert Cabbell Manners (b. 1990)
            - (8) Hugh Cabbell Manners (b. 1993)
        - Hon. Thomas Jasper Manners (1929–2022)
          - (9) Charles Henry Manners (b. 1957)
            - (10) Joseph Peter Manners (b. 1991)
          - (11) Arthur Roger Manners (b. 1959)
            - (12) Hugo Manners (b. 1989)
          - (13) Robert Hugh Manners (b. 1962)
            - (14) Archie Thomas Manners (b. 1993)
            - (15) Orlando Douglas Manners (b. 1995)
            - (16) Humphrey Wilmot Manners (b. 1998)
    - Hon. Arthur Manners-Sutton (1855–1888)
    - Hon. Claud Henry Manners-Sutton (1856–1913)
    - Hon. Charles William Manners-Sutton (1859–1879)

The heir apparent is the present holder's son, the Hon. John Alexander David Manners (born 2011).

The heir apparent's heir presumptive is the present holder's cousin, Edward Preston Manners (born 1948).

== Arms ==
Coat of arms of Baron Manners
Notes from 4th Baron after dropping the surname of Sutton Coronet Coronet of a Baron Crest On a Chapeau Gules, turned up Ermine, a Peacock in Pride proper. Escutcheon Or, two Bars Azure, a Chief quarterly Azure and Gules, the 1st and 4th quarters charged with two Fleurs-de-lis Gold, and the 2nd and 3rd with a Lion passant guardant Gold. Supporters Dexter: a Unicorn Argent, armed, unguled, crined and tufted Or, charged on the shoulder with a Cross Flory Azure. Sinister: an Unicorn Argent, armed, unguled, crined and tufted Or, charged on the shoulder with a Portcullis Sable. Motto POUR Y PARVENIR (In order to accomplish) Previous versions Borne before dropping the name of Sutton Quarterly: 1st & 4th, Argent, a Canton Sable (Sutton); 2nd & 3rd, Or, two Bars Azure, a Chief quarterly Azure and Gules, the 1st and 4th quarters charged with two Fleurs-de-lis Gold, and the 2nd and 3rd with a Lion passant guardant Gold (Manners).

== See also ==
- Duke of Rutland
- Viscount Canterbury
