= Flora Lucy Freeman =

British philanthropist and writer (1869–1960)

- Born: 4 April 1869; Westminster, London, England
- Died: 23 May 1960 (aged 91); Brighton, England
- Occupation: writer
- Known for: organising clubs for girls

Flora Lucy Freeman (4 April 1869 – 23 May 1960) was a British philanthropist and writer. She was known for starting clubs for girls and then writing to tell others how to also organise similar clubs. She was a Roman Catholic convert and she helped form Catholic Girl Guide troupes.

== Life ==
Freeman was born in Westminster in 1869. Her parents, Emily and William Henry Freeman, were Anglicans. Her father was a general practitioner. She had three elder brothers, she was well read and her family employed a nurse who she would read novels to. She became a writer.

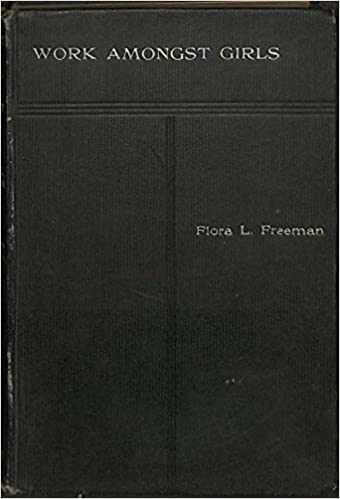
Work amongst Girls by Flora L Freeman

She and Maude Stanley were involved in creating clubs for girls. Her first club was formed when she was 21. She had disliked needlework as a child but these skills became essential to her clubs. The girls would learn how to hand sew and they would also get access to a sewing machine. She published Religious and Social Work Amongst Girls in 1901 in which she confesses her own shyness when talking about religious subjects to strangers. She explains her own approach and how upper and middle class girls can assist working class girls if they realise that they too can learn from the experience. At this time, helping in girls' clubs was a fashionable hobby for upper class girls who were denied a career or higher education. One report from the Cleckheaton Girls' Friendly Society in 1896 records that the helpers could not understand the lives of the clubs' members and the clubs' members could not understand what the upper-class helpers were saying.

In Brighton, she developed a special interest organisation to coordinate local clubs for "working-girls" named the "Brighton Girls' Club Union" in 1906. In 1908, she published Our Working-girls and How to Help Them: With Special Reference to Clubs and Classes. She wrote of the pleasures of shaping the "rough stone of slum childhood" and that although the leaders of these clubs would teach, they would also learn from the clubs members.

In 1911, she was involved with the creation of the National Organisation of Girls Clubs if only in the writing she had published in support of clubs for girls. She was an active member of the Girl Guide association. In 1916, she converted to Roman Catholicism and in March of that year she formed her first Catholic Girl Guide company, the "11th Brighton". The next year the "6th Hove" followed and in 1919 the "23rd Brighton".

In 1921, she published the first handbook for Catholic Guides.

Freeman died in 1960 in Brighton.
