= 1885 Grand National =

English steeplechase horse race

- Grand National
- Location: Aintree
- Date: 27 March 1885
- Winning horse: Roquefort
- Starting price: 10/3 F
- Jockey: Mr Ted Wilson
- Trainer: Arthur Yates
- Owner: Arthur Cooper
- Conditions: Good

The 1885 Grand National was the 47th renewal of the Grand National horse race that took place at Aintree near Liverpool, England, on 27 March 1885.

== Finishing Order ==
Position	Name	Jockey	Handicap (st-lb)	SP	Distance
01	Roquefort	Ted Wilson	11-0	10/3 F	2 Lengths
02	Frigate	Harry Beasley	11-10	7/1	
03	Black Prince	Tom Skelton	10-5	33/1	
04	Redpath	Arthur Coventry	10-3	20/1	
05	Axminster	W. Sayers	10-7	25/1	
06	Albert Cecil	John Childs	10-9	20/1	
07	Dog Fox	John Lee-Barber	10-3	25/1	
08	Lioness	George Lambton	11-7	?	
09	Red Hussar	Harry Armitage	10-7	50/1	Last to Complete

== Non-finishers ==
Fence	Name	Jockey	Handicap (st-lb)	SP	Fate
21	Zoedone	Count Charles Kinsky	11-11	5/1	Fell
07	Kilworth	Roddy Owen	11-6	10/1	Fell
22	Candahar	William Hunt	10-12	25/1	Pulled Up
?	Jolly Sir John	William Nightingall	10-12	50/1	?
23	Belmont	WD Canavan	10-11	100/6	Pulled Up
?	Lang Syne	T Hall	10-8	?	?
23	Ben More	William Moore	10-7	100/8	Fell
01	Harlequin	Billy Sensier	10-0	50/1	Fell
26	Gamecock	William Stephens	10-0	50/1	Fell
?	Downpatrick	Willie Morris	10-0	20/1	?
