= John Manners-Sutton, 3rd Baron Manners =

British nobleman (1852–1927)

The Right Honourable The Lord Manners
- Born: 15 May 1852
- Died: 19 August 1927 (aged 75); Sopley, Hampshire, England
- Known for: Winning the 1882 Grand National

John Thomas Manners-Sutton, 3rd Baron Manners (15 May 1852 – 19 August 1927) was a British nobleman. He is known for an 1881 wager, when Manners wagered that he could buy, train, and ride to victory a horse in the Grand National, and succeeded.

== Background and life ==
Manners was born to John Thomas Manners-Sutton, 2nd Baron Manners and Lydia Sophia Dashwood.

He was commissioned an officer in the Grenadier Guards, but resigned the commission as a lieutenant. In 1900 he accepted to be a militia officer, and was appointed a captain in the 3rd (Hampshire Militia) Battalion, Hampshire Regiment on 18 March 1900, resigning this commission on 4 March 1903.

== The wager ==
In 1881, Manners made a bet that he could buy, train and ride the winner of the 1882 Grand National. With just a few months in which to prepare, Manners managed to procure a horse called Seaman for £1,900. The vendor, an Irishman called Lindt, was not certain that the horse could be trained to the required standard in time for the race and few believed Manners had the riding ability or experience necessary.

The day of the race brought some of the worst weather conditions in Aintree's history. The freezing conditions and snow meant many jockeys took a more cautious approach and held back, but Manners drove on until he found himself level with the favourite at the final fence. Manner's horse started to go lame but he managed to press it over the line to win his bet by a short lead. The horse never raced again but lived with the family at the family home for the rest of its life.

== Avon Tyrrell house ==
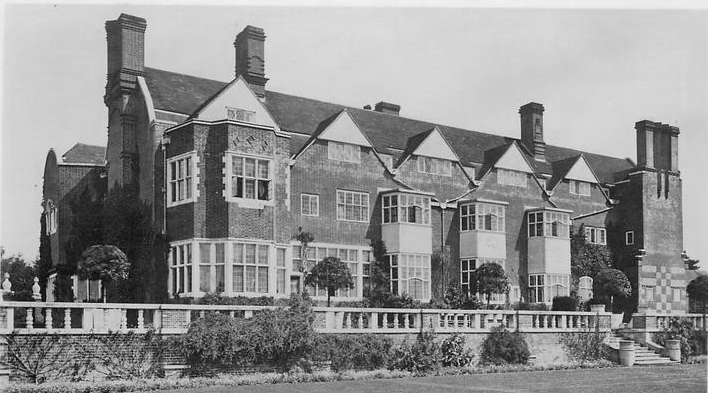
Avon Tyrrell in 1910

With the proceeds of his wager, Manners built a house, Avon Tyrrell, on his sister-in-law's land in Sopley, Hampshire. The medium-sized country residence was designed by the renowned architect W.R. Lethaby and was completed in 1891. Built with 365 windows, 52 rooms, 12 chimneys, 4 wings and 7 external doors, it is what is commonly known as a calendar house. It is now a Grade I listed building and is considered to be one of the archetypal Arts & Crafts buildings.

The racehorse, Seaman, is buried in the grounds between two trees, having lived out its days as a family pet.

The house was used as a convalescent home during the First World War and a hospital during the Second World War. The family never moved back in however, and in 1949 it was donated to the 'youth of the nation'. To that end, Avon Tyrrell House is now owned by a charity that provides holidays, courses, personal development and activities for young people.

== Family ==
On 12 Aug 1885, Manners married Constance Edwina Adelaide Hamlyn-Fane the daughter of Henry Edward Hamlyn-Fane and Susan Hester Hamlyn-Williams. They had five children: Twin daughters, Angela Margaret and Betty Constance Manners, born 15 June 1889; An older daughter, Mary Christine, born 4 December 1886 and two sons, John Neville Manners-Sutton who was born in 1892 and killed in action on 1 September 1914 and Francis Henry Manners-Sutton, later to become 4th Baron Manners, born 21 July 1897. Constance died on 4 March 1920 and on 5 September 1922 Manners was remarried to Zoe Virginie Guinness (née Nugent), the widow of Claude Hume Campbell Guinness; and daughter of Albert Llewellyn Nugent, 3rd Baron Nugent and Elizabeth Baltazzi.

His daughter Angela Margaret undertook three months nurse training from February 1914 at The London Hospital under matron Eva Luckes. From August - November she was a nursing sister on the Manners Ambulance in Belgium. From 1915 she was Matron of the Avon Tyrell Convalescent home for New Zealand Officers, Bransgore, Hampshire. Angela's twin sister Betty married Arthur Asquith, son of Prime Minister H. H. Asquith.

Peerage of the United Kingdom
Preceded by John Manners-Sutton	Baron Manners; 1864–1827	Succeeded by Francis Manners
