= 1883 Grand National =

English steeplechase horse race

- Grand National
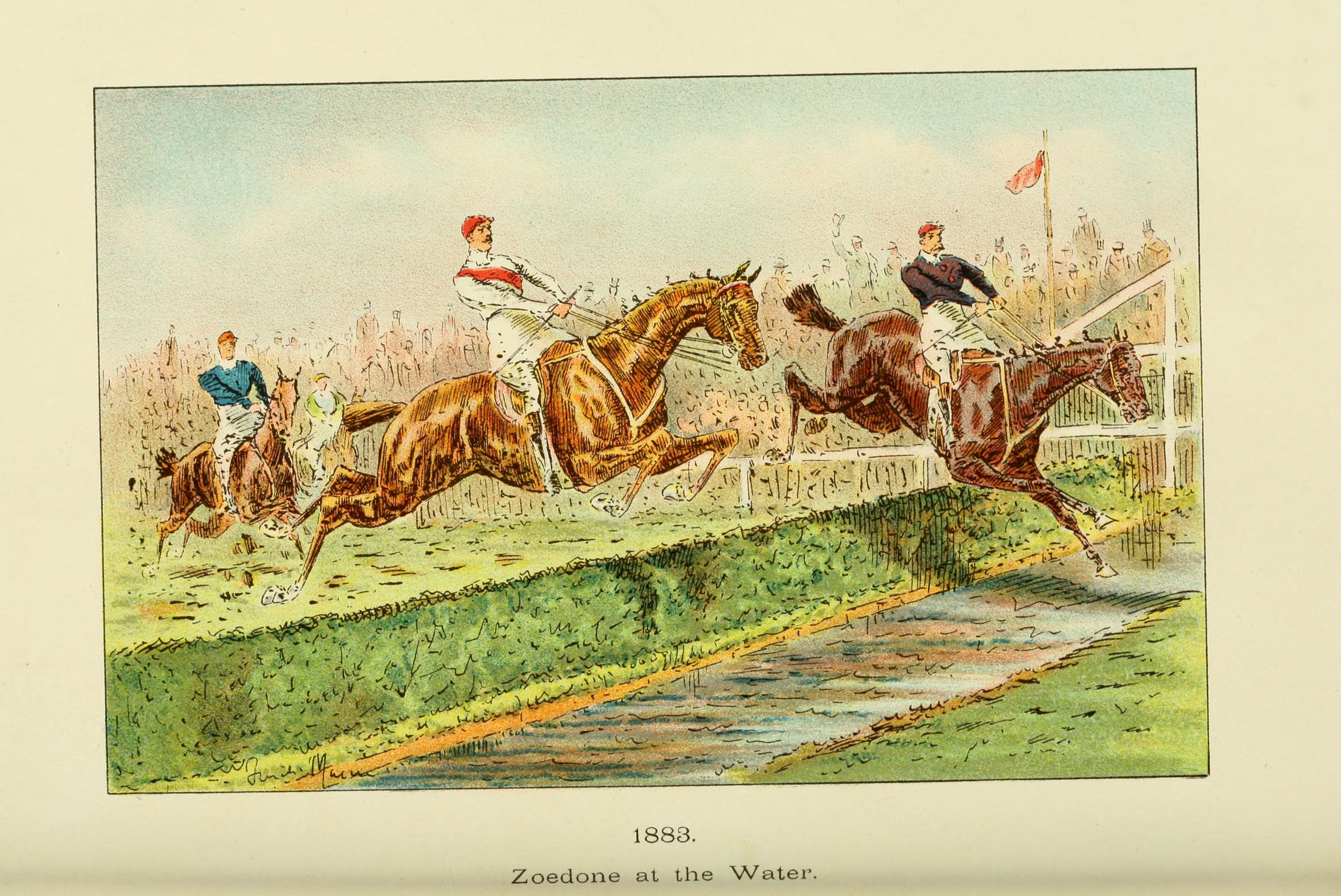
- Zoedone at the Water (from Heroes and heroines of the Grand National)
- Location: Aintree
- Date: 30 March 1883
- Winning horse: (England) Zoedone
- Starting price: 100/8
- Jockey: (Austria) Count Charles Kinsky
- Trainer: W. Jenkins
- Owner: (Austria) Count Charles Kinsky
- Conditions: Heavy

The 1883 Grand National was the 45th renewal of the Grand National horse race that took place at Aintree near Liverpool, England, on 30 March 1883. With only 10 starters, it was the smallest Grand National field in history (excluding the precursors of 1836–8).

== Finishing Order ==
Position	Name	Jockey	Handicap (st-lb)	SP	Distance
01	Zoedone	Count Charles Kinsky	11-0	100/8	10 Lengths
02	Black Prince	Mr D Canavan	10-4	100/3	6 Lengths
03	Downpatrick	Tom Widger	10-7	100/7	
04	Zitella	Tommy Beasley	11-2	3/1 F	
05	Montauban	Ted Wilson	10-9	9/1	
06	Eau De Vie	Dan Thirlwell	11-10	9/2	Last to Complete

== Non-finishers ==
Fence	Name	Jockey	Handicap (st-lb)	SP	Fate
?	Mohican	Harry Beasley	12-1	9/1	Fell
?	Athlacca	Jimmy Adams	11-4	9/1	Pulled Up
?	Cortolvin	Arthur Barker	10-5	100/3	Fell
02	Jolly Sir John	Arthur Coventry	10-5	100/12	Refused
