= Moorlands College =

Coordinates: 50°46′09″N 1°46′30″W

Moorlands College is an Evangelical Christian training college with a campus in Sopley (near Christchurch) Dorset, and a regional Centre in Devon. All degree courses (including undergraduate and postgraduate degrees) are validated by the University of Gloucestershire. The college is non-denominational and holds a statement of faith which is shared by several Evangelical Christian organisations. The college participates in the Government’s Teaching Excellence Framework (TEF) and was given a provisional award under the framework in 2017. Steve Brady was the college's principal until 2018. As of 2025, the principal is Andy du Feu.

Public funding of the college has been criticised by the National Secular Society, which in March 2026 stated it would pursue a judicial review of the Office for Students for inadequate handling of complaints against the student funding of a number of bible and theological colleges for allegedly restricting academic freedom and freedom of expression.

== Programmes at Moorlands College ==
Moorlands College offers various programmes in Applied Theology at undergraduate, postgraduate and short course level.

The Applied Theology, Youth and Community Work degree is validated by the National Youth Agency, and graduates of this programme receive JNC professional qualification. It is the only provider offering professional grade youth work accreditation alongside theology.

=== Undergraduate ===
- Foundation Year
- BA (Hons) in applied theology
- BA (Hons) in applied theology (youth and community work) with JNC professional qualification

=== Postgraduate ===
- MA in applied theology; four specialist modules
  - Apologetics
  - Christian leadership
  - Chaplaincy
  - The Bible and preaching
- MA in language, community and development

== Moorlands Centres ==
Moorlands College has centres in two regions:

- Christchurch Campus - South West Regional Centre
