= Angela Manners =

Angela Margaret Manners, RRC - Second Class, (15 June 1889 – 1 February 1970), was a member of the British aristocracy. During the First World War she worked on the Manners Ambulance, and was matron of Avon Tyrell Convalescent home for New Zealand Officers, Sopley, Hampshire.

== Nursing career and the First World War ==
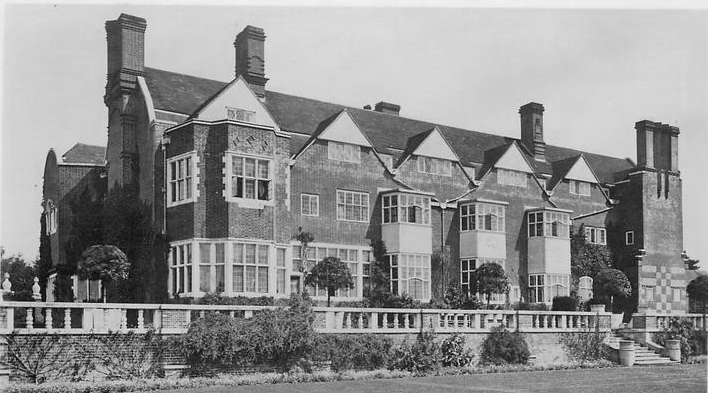
Avon Tyrell Convalescent Home for New Zealand Officers, 1914-1919

Manners undertook three months nurse training as a paying probationer at The London Hospital from February 1914 under matron Eva Luckes. At the outbreak of war, Manners worked as a nursing Sister on the Manners Ambulance from August 1914 -November 1914. Manners had organised the Manners Ambulance which was funded by her family. She had recruited Catherine Elizabeth Anna Thorpe, matron of the West End Hospital in Welbeck Street, London, to be matron in charge of the ambulance. Thorpe was a fully trained nurse who had also trained at The London Hospital. Described as a "Red Cross Heroine" Manners and Nellie Hozier (Winston Churchill's sister in law) were among the first 'Society girls' who rushed off to Belgium at the outbreak of the First World War. Manners and Hozier arrived in Belgium just after the Battle of Mons. Initially the Germans allowed them to remain and nurse the injured British prisoners of war, but shortly afterward they were arrested and inprisoned, where they were given 'bread and water'. Eventually Manners and Hozier were allowed to return home via Norway. Although Manners had appointed a fully trained nurse as matron of the ambulance the nursing press were concerned that society ladies with little or no nursing experience or training had rushed off to Belgium at the outbreak of war.

After their release, Manners returned home, and from 1914 until 1919 she ran the Avon Tyrell Convalescent home for New Zealand Officers, in her family's home.

== Married life ==
In 1925 she married Colonel Hon. Christian Malise Hore-Ruthven, and they had three children. Her twin sister Betty married Brigadier General Arthur Asquith, son of Henry Asquith, the former Prime Minister, in 1918.

== Honours ==
In March 1916 Manners was awarded the Royal Red Cross- Second Class in recognition for her valuable services and devotion to duty when they worked under the Belgian Red Cross in Flanders.
