= Francis Manners, 4th Baron Manners =

Francis Henry Manners, 4th Baron Manners MC (21 July 1897 – 25 November 1972) was a British soldier, landowner, and peer, a member of the House of Lords from 1927 until his death.

== Life ==
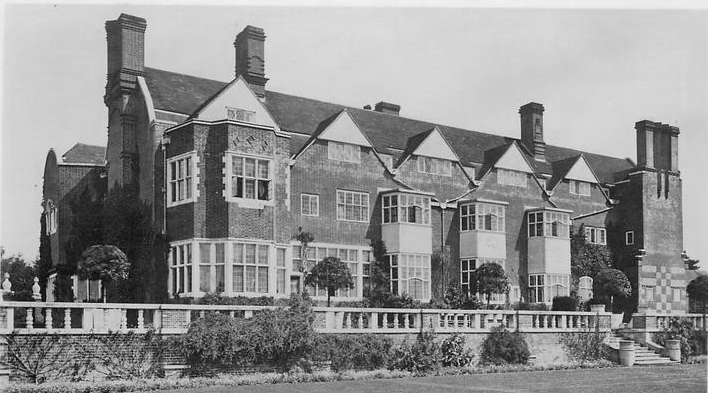
Avon Tyrrell House

Manners was the second son of John Manners-Sutton, 3rd Baron Manners, and his wife Constance Edwina Adelaide Hamlyn-Fane, a daughter of Henry Hamlyn-Fane. But their older son John Neville Manners was killed in September 1914 in the First World War, leaving Manners as the heir to his father’s peerage and his mother’s estate at Avon Tyrrell in Hampshire. Educated at Eton, Manners was a cadet in the Officers' Training Corps, and on 23 July 1915 he was commissioned into the Grenadier Guards as a Second Lieutenant; during the war he rose to the rank of Captain. He was aide-de-camp to Arthur Asquith, who on 30 April 1918 married his sister, Betty Constance Manners.

On 4 March 1920 Manners’s mother died, followed on 19 August 1927 by his father, when he inherited a seat in the House of Lords. In 1933 he was appointed as a Justice of the Peace and in 1939 as a Deputy Lieutenant for Hampshire. He fought in the Second World War, rising to the rank of Lieutenant-Colonel in the Hampshire Regiment and being awarded the Military Cross.

His house was requisitioned during the War, and after it ended Manners decided not to return to live in it. In 1949 he gave the house to a charitable trust, the National Association of Girls' Clubs and Mixed Clubs.

Manners was elected to Hampshire County Council. In 1948 he was Chairman of its Welfare Services Sub-Committee, and was still a county councillor in 1961. By 1968, he had been succeeded in this role by his wife.

In 1968, Manners was living on his estate at Tyrrell's Ford, Christchurch, a large 18th century house standing in ten acres of grounds.

On his death in 1972, Manners was succeeded by his eldest son, John.

== Marriage and children ==
In 1921, Manners married Mary Gascoyne-Cecil, a daughter of Lord William Cecil and a granddaughter of prime minister Robert Gascoyne-Cecil, 3rd Marquess of Salisbury. Her mother was Lady Florence Mary Bootle-Wilbraham, a daughter Edward Bootle-Wilbraham, 1st Earl of Lathom. They had three sons, John, Thomas, and Richard, and a daughter, Patricia Anne.

At the outbreak of the Second World War, the register of the National Registration Act 1939 recorded the household at Avon Tyrrell. Lady Florence Cecil was living with her daughter and son-in-law, and there were some fifteen servants, including two cooks and a kitchenmaid, two gardeners, a chauffeur, three housemaids, and a dairyman.

Peerage of the United Kingdom
Preceded by John Manners-Sutton	Baron Manners; 1927–1972	Succeeded by John Robert Cecil Manners
