= 1882 Grand National =

English steeplechase horse race

- Grand National
- Location: Aintree
- Date: 24 March 1882
- Winning horse: Seaman
- Starting price: 10/1
- Jockey: (England) Lord Manners
- Trainer: James Jewitt
- Owner: (England) Lord Manners
- Conditions: Heavy

The 1882 Grand National was the 44th renewal of the Grand National horse race that took place at Aintree near Liverpool, England, on 24 March 1882.

The race was held on 24 March in some of the worst conditions ever seen in the race's history. The heavy snow and freezing conditions had put many off and there were only twelve starters including: Cyrus, The Scot, Eau de Vie, Zoedone, Fay and Seaman. Seaman was not a fit horse and he and his owner, Lord Manners, had only come to be in the race as the result of an extraordinary wager.

== An extraordinary wager ==
In late 1881, the 3rd Baron Manners bet a large sum of money that he could buy, train and ride the winner of the 1882 Grand National. With just four months in which to prepare, he managed to procure Seaman, a six-year-old gelding, for £1,900. The vendor, an Irishman called Henry Linde, expressed his concerns over the sickly Seaman and didn't believe the horse was capable of such a feat, even if there had been sufficient time in which to train him. It was widely held that Manners lacked the riding ability and experience necessary to win such a tough race. Lord Manners, recognising his own short comings, set about entering as many amateur races as he could in order to gain some experience. He had limited success until three weeks before the National, when he won the Grand Military Gold Cup at Sandown, riding a horse called Chancellor.

== The race ==
On 24 March, in heavy snow, twelve horses lined up for the start of the 1882 Grand National. The dreadful conditions caused some of the more cautious riders to hold back and it was another outsider that took an early lead. Eau de Vie was jumping well despite the heavy going and managed to maintain the lead until the second lap when his rider's stirrup broke on the approach to Becher's Brook. By this time, there were only six runners left as many had retired, and as Eau de Vie swerved off into the crowd, Zoedone took the lead, with Fay, Cyrus, Seaman and The Scot following. With only two fences left before the home straight, Cyrus moved out in front and looked certain to win. Seaman in second place looked exhausted and was starting to go lame but with just 300 yards to go, Seaman managed to find something and with the determined Manners driving him on, won the race by a head; much to the amazement of the crowd. A long way behind was Zoedone, who went on to win the 1883 National. Montauban was effectively pulled up after jumping the final hurdle, but in walking in, technically completed the course in fourth and last place. Seaman never raced again but lived with the family at the family home for the rest of its life.

== Finishing Order ==
Position	Name	Jockey	Handicap (st-lb)	SP	Distance
01	Seaman	John Manners-Sutton	11-6	10-1	Head
02	Cyrus	Tom Beasley	10-9	9-2	A distance
03	Zoedone	Arthur Smith	10-0	20-1	A distance
04	Montauban	George Waddington	10-7	100-6	Last to finish, walked in

== Non-finishers ==
Fence	Name	Jockey	Handicap (st-lb)	SP	Fate
17	The Liberator	Jimmy Adams	12-7	20-1	Fell
?	The Scot	James Jewitt	11-8	5-1	Fell
18	Wild Monarch	Henry Andrews	10-12	100-7	Fell
17	Eau De Vie	Dan Thirlwell	10-8	100-8	Ran Out
17	Mohican	Harry Beasley	10-7	100-30	Fell
19	Fay	Ted Wilson	10-7	?	Fell
02	Ignition	Billy Sensier	10-5	50-1	Refused
17	Black Prince	F Wynne	10-0	?	Fell
