= UK Youth =

British charitable organization

UK Youth is a Hampshire-based charitable organization, which was founded in 1911 for youth work.

== Management ==
The patron of the charity is Her Royal Highness Princess Anne. The current president is Nigel Mansell, CBE. The chair is Anne Stoneham, MBE, who has been on the board of trustees for over 20 years and is an academic. The chief executive, Ndidi Okezie, took up her post in January 2020. Her predecessor was Anna Smee, who is now the CEO of Youth Futures Foundations.

== History ==
The charity's beginnings date back to 1911 as the National Organisation of Girls' Clubs. Among those who brought it about was Flora Freeman who gave practical help as well as assisting its creation in her writing. It became the National Association of Girls Clubs and Mixed Clubs in 1944 (or 1945) and the National Association of Youth Clubs in 1961. In 1987, it became known as Youth Clubs UK and adopted its current title UK Youth in 2001. In 2010-11, it celebrated its centenary. During that year the tag line of the charity change from the 'Network for Quality Work with Young People' to 'Positive for Youth'. Birmingham Library holds the full archive of materials from the history of the organisation. In 2017 UK Youth merged with the charity Ambition.

== Missions and objectives ==
UK Youth has the following three charitable objectives:

=== Youth work development ===
The charity’s core work focuses on the development of youth work by providing training to youth workers, publications and toolkits to support their work and regular events and reports aimed at those that work with young people. UK Youth's work aims to apply the principles of effective youth work to the contemporary interests and needs of young people via programmes that offer accredited learning outcomes.

UK Youth works with a wide range of organisations including international corporations, government departments and agencies in the UK and Europe as well as other voluntary bodies and corporates to promote a wide range of opportunities to young people.

=== Network ===
UK Youth is a membership organisation that has national partners, regional members and associate members together covering the whole of the United Kingdom. They support over 5,500 organisations from within their network.

UK Youth has four national partners: Youth Cymru, Youth Scotland, Youth Action Northern Ireland and Youth Work Ireland.

UK Youth also has 39 county-based associations which are members and eight associate members.

The charity works in partnership with a wide range of organisations in tendering and delivering work programmes to young people, for example, the Big Music Project is supported by the BIG Lottery Fund, and the delivery consortium includes the BRITs school, Global Radio and Capital FM working with UK Youth and Youth Scotland, Youth Cymru, Youth Action Northern Ireland, MyPlace and Rathbone.

The organisation also participates in the Creative Collisions Conferences which bring many youth sector organisations together each year to discuss issues affecting the sector.

=== Advocacy for Youth Work ===
Directly, and with key partner organisations, UK Youth aims to create an environment in which youth work is valued by advocating the social and economic benefits of high quality youth work, both to young people and their wider communities and publicising the distinct contribution that youth workers can make to the lives of young people.

The charity particularly focuses on:

- Programmes developed by UK Youth
- Advocacy for youth work
- Policy development
- Participation of young people in the design and delivery of programmes

== Current work ==
=== UK Youth Voice ===
This group of 16- to 25-year-olds is made up of two young people from each region of England, one from the Channel Islands, and two each from Scotland, Wales and Northern Ireland. They meet five times per year to guide and advise the charity and to plan an annual youth conference which is open to all young people across the UK. Three members of UK Youth Voice sit on the board of trustees and are involved in all areas of governance.

=== UK Youth's awards and qualifications ===
The Youth Achievement Awards and other awards and qualifications that UK Youth delivers were developed to help youth workers develop more effective participative youth work and to recognise and accredit young people’s achievements and learning.

The Youth Achievement Awards started as a pilot project run from 1994 to 1997 funded by the National Lottery Board. The project developed the first national award to utilise a youth work models in order to accredit young people’s achievements and learning from youth work. UK Youth now operates two qualifications on the Qualifications & Credit Framework as well as awards for young children.

UK Youth's awards and qualifications are characterised by:

- A person-centred approach to non-formal learning which particularly benefits young people who do less well in a conventional school setting whose capabilities and motivation are affected by different situational, personal and relational factors
- Are flexible which allows for delivery in many contexts and to students with different levels of confidence and ability
- Set individual challenges which promote a young person’s ‘achievement’ level and offers rewards for this.

=== Previous Programmes ===
- Lloyds Money for Life Challenge - Lloyds Banking Group’s money management programme, targeted at young people and adults in the wider Further Education, work-based learning and community learning sectors.
- Microsoft IT Youth Hubs - in partnership with Microsoft supporting youth clubs and projects to become IT Youth Hubs and benefit from hardware, software, mentoring and financial support.
- The Big Music Project - a programme that will create 100 music hubs which help young people access the support they need to run their own music projects.

== Fundraising activities ==
Art for Youth
Art for Youth is UK Youth's flagship fundraising event which enables promising artists to show their work and raises funds for UK Youth. With over 24 years of successful exhibitions in London, Art for Youth has given art enthusiasts the chance to buy works from contemporary artists at the beginning of their careers whilst donating to charity.

Art for Youth in London has raised over £900,000 for UK Youth. Over 1,000 pieces of art (valued from £100- £3,500) by new and established artists go on display at Art for Youth London. Works usually include oils, watercolours, sculpture ceramics, photographs and jewellery. Artists donate 35% of sales and all proceeds from the raffle, auction, "mystery pictures" and silent auction are 100% donations to the charity.

New artists are chosen by a selection panel which seeks fresh, innovative and affordable work. Art for Youth London enables new and upcoming artists to exhibit at the Royal College of Art alongside more established talent. The Diana Brooks Prize is awarded annually to an artist aged 35 or under. Many former prize winners, some of whom have gone on to very successful artistic careers, offer a piece of their work for sale as a 100% donation to UK Youth.

London Marathon

UK Youth is also one of the charities that have joined TCS London Marathon. Through this partnership, runners are able to secure places in the race by committing to fundraising targets. Participants frequently use personal fundraising pages, often through GivenGain, and community events to raise awareness and financial support for UK Youth’s programs. Notable runners that have ran for UK Youth is Billy Nunn, who ran the London Marathon for the charity at 18 becoming one of the youngest to run the London Marathon. He then went on to become the youngest person in the UK to run 7 Marathons in 7 Days.

== Archives ==
Papers of UK Youth are held at the Cadbury Research Library, University of Birmingham.

== See also ==
- Youth unemployment in the United Kingdom
