= Four Ten =

British-bred Thoroughbred racehorse

- Sire: Blunderbuss
- Grandsire: Blandford
- Dam: Undue Praise
- Damsire: Felicitation
- Sex: Gelding
- Foaled: 1946
- Country: United Kingdom
- Colour: Bay
- Breeder: Alan Strange
- Owner: Alan Strange
- Trainer: Alan Strange; John Roberts; Alec Kirkpatrick

Major wins
- National Hunt Handicap Chase (1953); Cheltenham Gold Cup (1954)

Four Ten (1946 – 1971) was a British Thoroughbred racehorse who won the 1954 Cheltenham Gold Cup. A former point-to-pointer he was professionally trained near Cheltenham Racecourse by John Roberts and won the National Hunt Handicap Chase at his local course in 1953. In the following season he made rapid improvement and defeated a strong field to win the Gold Cup in March. He went on to finish third in the 1955 Gold Cup and won several other good steeplechases. He died in 1971.

== Background ==
Four Ten was a bay gelding standing 17 hands high, with a white blaze bred by his owner Alan Strange, a dairy farmer from Spetisbury in Dorset. The horse, named after a type of small-bore shotgun., was probably the best horse sired by Blunderbuss, a once-raced son of Blandford. Four Ten's dam Undue Praise was a daughter of the Ascot Gold Cup winner Felicitation and a female-line descendant of Mabille, the foundation mare of Thoroughbred family 2-o. She had been considered useless and was scheduled to be put down before being bought by Strange.

Strange originally used Four Ten as a hunter before training the horse himself for races on the amateur point-to-point circuit. The horse ran six times in point-to-points winning four times consecutively before falling in a hunter chase. Strange then sent him to the professional, John Roberts, who trained at Cheltenham in Gloucestershire.

== Racing career ==
After his move to the professional ranks Four Ten made an immediate impact. At the 1953 Cheltenham Festival the seven-year-old carried 147 pounds to victory in the National Hunt Handicap Chase.

In the early part of the following season, Four Ten further established himself as a high-class steeplechaser with an "impressive" win over three miles at Cheltenham in November, beating E.S.B. and Mariner's Log. The 27th running of the Cheltenham Gold Cup took place on heavy ground on 5 March 1954. The nine-runner field included Knock Hard, Halloween, Mont Tremblant, Galloway Braes (third in 1953) and Shaef (runner-up in 1952). Mont Tremblant started favourite ahead of Knock Hard with Four Ten, ridden by the County Waterford-born Tommy Cusack starting at odds of 100/6. Galloway Braes led until falling six fences from the finish, leaving Mont Tremblant looking the likely winner before he began to struggle approaching the penultimate obstacle. Mariner's Log took over the lead, but Four Ten, relishing the heavy ground, moved up to challenge at the last and drew away up the run-in to win by four lengths. Halloween was another four lengths back in third ahead of Mont Tremblant and Knock Hard.

In the 1954/55 National Hunt season Four Ten won three of his first four races including two wide-margin victories at Warwick Racecourse in December and January. He then attempted to win his second Gold Cup on 10 March. The meeting was run in exceptionally harsh, wintry conditions with the Gold Cup being the only race allowed to take place on the third day. With Cusack again in the saddle he started the 3/1 favourite against eight opponents headed by Halloween, Galloway Braes and Early Mist but finished third behind the 33/1 outsider Gay Donald.

In the following season Four Ten was trained by Alec Kirkpatrick near Andover, Hampshire. He finished third to Halloween in the King George VI Chase and showed good form in January as he led from the start to win the Walter Hyde Chase at Kempton Park Racecourse, conceding 35 pounds to the runner-up. Commenting on the horse's tendency to jump to the left, Kirkpatrick explained that Four Ten would be better suited by a left-handed track and would probably contest both the Gold Cup and the Grand National. He returned for a third Gold Cup in 1956 and was well-fancied but after leading early in the race he finished unplaced behind Limber Hill. In the following year he started a 50/1 outsider for the 1957 Grand National and fell at the third last.

Four Ten won a total of nine races between his second Gold Cup attempt and his retirement. He was euthanised in 1971 at the age of twenty-five.

== Assessment and honours ==
In their book, A Century of Champions, based on the Timeform rating system, John Randall and Tony Morris rated Four Ten a "poor" Gold Cup winner.

== Pedigree ==
Pedigree of Four Ten (GB), bay gelding, 1946
Sire Blunderbuss (GB) 1934	Blandford (IRE); 1919	Swynford	John O'Gaunt
Sire Blunderbuss (GB) 1934	Blandford (IRE); 1919	Swynford	Canterbury Pilgrim
Sire Blunderbuss (GB) 1934	Blandford (IRE); 1919	Blanche	White Eagle
Sire Blunderbuss (GB) 1934	Blandford (IRE); 1919	Blanche	Black Cherry
Sire Blunderbuss (GB) 1934	Drifting Flame (GB); 1924	Hurry On	Marcovil
Sire Blunderbuss (GB) 1934	Drifting Flame (GB); 1924	Hurry On	Tout Suite
Sire Blunderbuss (GB) 1934	Drifting Flame (GB); 1924	Fine Mist	Sunstar
Sire Blunderbuss (GB) 1934	Drifting Flame (GB); 1924	Fine Mist	Lorgnette
Dam Undue Praise (GB) 1939	Felicitation (GB); 1930	Colorado	Phalaris
Dam Undue Praise (GB) 1939	Felicitation (GB); 1930	Colorado	Canyon
Dam Undue Praise (GB) 1939	Felicitation (GB); 1930	Felicita	Cantilever
Dam Undue Praise (GB) 1939	Felicitation (GB); 1930	Felicita	Best Wishes
Dam Undue Praise (GB) 1939	Lady Scapegrace (FR); 1929	McKinley	Macdonald
Dam Undue Praise (GB) 1939	Lady Scapegrace (FR); 1929	McKinley	Mrs Despard
Dam Undue Praise (GB) 1939	Lady Scapegrace (FR); 1929	Kate Coventry	Argos
Dam Undue Praise (GB) 1939	Lady Scapegrace (FR); 1929	Kate Coventry	Ada Merling (Family: 2-o)
