= Knock Hard =

Irish-bred Thoroughbred racehorse

- Sire: Domaha
- Grandsire: Vatout
- Dam: Knocksouna
- Damsire: Beresford
- Sex: Gelding
- Foaled: 1944
- Country: Ireland
- Colour: Chestnut
- Owner: Moya & Harry Keogh; Francis More O'Ferrall
- Trainer: Vincent O'Brien

Major wins
- Great Yorkshire Chase (1953); Cheltenham Gold Cup (1953)

Knock Hard (foaled 1944) was an Irish Thoroughbred racehorse who won the 1953 Cheltenham Gold Cup. He showed good form on the flat, winning the Irish Lincoln Handicap and finished second in the Irish Cesarewitch and the November Handicap. As a steeplechaser he was a fast but unreliable jumper who fell when well fancied in both the King George VI Chase and the Cheltenham Gold Cup in the 1951/52 National Hunt season. In the following year his early form was inconsistent but he then won the Great Yorkshire Chase before defeating a strong field in the Gold Cup. His subsequent form deteriorated and he was retired to become a hunter in England.

== Background ==
Knock Hard was a chestnut gelding with a narrow white blaze and white socks on his hind legs bred in Ireland. His sire Domaha was a successful National Hunt stallion whose other offspring included Dormant who won the Whitbread Gold Cup and the King George VI Chase as well as finishing second to Arkle in the Cheltenham Gold Cup. Knock Hard's dam Knocksouna was half-sister to Florrie, the dam of the Irish Derby winner Thirteen of Diamonds. She was also a great-granddaughter of Princess Dorrie who won the 1000 Guineas and the Oaks Stakes 1914 and was a half-sister to Sunstar.

The wartime market for yearlings was depressed and Knock Hard fetched only 75 guineas when put up for auction in 1945. During his racing career, the gelding was owned by Moya and Harry Keogh and trained by Vincent O'Brien in County Cork before moving to Ballydoyle from 1951. O'Brien made a major impact on British jump racing in the decade after World War II sending out Cottage Rake to win three Gold Cups and Hatton's Grace to win three Champion Hurdles before training three consecutive Grand National winners in Early Mist, Royal Tan and Quare Times.

== Racing career ==
=== Flat career ===
Knock Hard began his career on the flat and developed into a high-class handicapper. In November 1950 he was the subject of a major gamble for the Irish Cesarewitch but was beaten by his stablemate Hatton's Grace after his amateur jockey ignored the trainer's instructions and went to the front too soon. In the following spring he won the apparently competitive Irish Lincoln Handicap over one mile, opening up a clear lead after three furlongs and winning by six lengths. O'Brien actually admitted that Knock Hard was essentially a flat racer and had "no natural aptitude for jumping".

=== 1951/52 National Hunt season ===
Knock Hard had been tried over fences before his win in the Irish Lincoln and in the 1951/52 National Hunt season he developed into a high-class steeplechaser. In December he was sent to race in England for the first time for the King George VI Chase but fell in a race won by the six-year-old Statecraft. He was going well at the time and his rider Phonsie O'Brien (younger brother of the trainer) stated that if he had not fallen he would have won by fifteen lengths.

On 6 March 1952 Knock Hard made his first attempt to win the Cheltenham Gold Cup and started the 5/1 second favourite in a thirteen-runner field. Ridden again by Phonsie O'Brien he was closing on the leaders and looked likely to win when falling at the penultimate obstacle.

=== 1952/53 National Hunt season ===
In the late autumn of 1952 Knock Hard returned to the flat and finished second to the three-year-old Summer Rain (winner of the Chester Vase) in the November Handicap at Manchester Racecourse. He jumped poorly when unplaced behind Halloween in the King George VI Chase and was beaten again when conceding 20 pounds to Mariner's Log at Leopardstown. The horse's performance in the latter race saw O'Brien summoned to appear before the stewards of the Irish Turf Club who suspected that Knock Hard's poor performance had been engineered by his connections to improve his odds in future races. After two disappointing runs Vincent O'Brien had the gelding examined by a Dublin vet who diagnosed a potentially serious heart problem. O'Brien decided to continue racing the horse but only after explaining the risks to his owner and to his jockey Tim Molony. Knock Hard was back in England in early 1953 for the Great Yorkshire Chase at Doncaster Racecourse and won from the 1952 Grand National winner Teal to whom he was conceding weight.

On a cold, misty day at Cheltenham on 5 March he made his second attempt to win the Gold Cup. He started at odds of 11/2 against eleven opponents including Halloween (the favourite), Mont Tremblant, E.S.B., Mariners Log and Teal. Knock Hard was not amongst the early leaders and when the horses emerged from the fog approaching the third last he appeared to be out of contention as E.S.B., Mont Tremblant, Galloway Braes and Rose Park disputed the lead. Mont Tremblant soon weakened and Rose Park fell at the second last but Knock Hard began to make rapid progress. He took the lead at the last and drew away up the run-in to win by five lengths and two lengths from Halloween and Galloway Braes.

=== Later career, retirement and death ===
In March 1954 Knock Hard attempted to repeat his 1953 success in the Gold Cup but struggled on the heavy ground and finished fifth of the nine runners behind Four Ten, Mariner's Log, Halloween and Mont Tremblant.

Knock Hard later was bought by Francis More O'Ferrall. His form deteriorated further and he was given away to Lady Jane Lumley, the daughter of Lord Scarbrough and he was moved to England to become a hunter. He collapsed and died approximately two years later, probably due to a recurrence of his heart condition.

== Assessment and honours ==
In their book, A Century of Champions, based on the Timeform rating system, John Randall and Tony Morris rated Knock Hard a "superior" Gold Cup winner.

== Pedigree ==
Pedigree of Knock Hard (IRE), chestnut gelding, 1944
Sire Domaha (FR) 1934	Vatout (FR); 1926	Prince Chimay	Chaucer
Sire Domaha (FR) 1934	Vatout (FR); 1926	Prince Chimay	Galorette
Sire Domaha (FR) 1934	Vatout (FR); 1926	Vashti	Sans Souci
Sire Domaha (FR) 1934	Vatout (FR); 1926	Vashti	Vaya
Sire Domaha (FR) 1934	Proserpine (FR); 1928	Eugene de Savoie	Jacobi
Sire Domaha (FR) 1934	Proserpine (FR); 1928	Eugene de Savoie	Yolande
Sire Domaha (FR) 1934	Proserpine (FR); 1928	Prahova	D'Or
Sire Domaha (FR) 1934	Proserpine (FR); 1928	Prahova	La Prevoyante
Dam Knocksouna (IRE) 1938	Beresford (GB); 1921	Friar Marcus	Cicero
Dam Knocksouna (IRE) 1938	Beresford (GB); 1921	Friar Marcus	Prim Nun
Dam Knocksouna (IRE) 1938	Beresford (GB); 1921	Bayberry	Bayardo
Dam Knocksouna (IRE) 1938	Beresford (GB); 1921	Bayberry	Catalpa
Dam Knocksouna (IRE) 1938	Cloudless (GB); 1928	Thunderer	Sunstar
Dam Knocksouna (IRE) 1938	Cloudless (GB); 1928	Thunderer	Lauda
Dam Knocksouna (IRE) 1938	Cloudless (GB); 1928	Queen of Diamonds	Polymelus
Dam Knocksouna (IRE) 1938	Cloudless (GB); 1928	Queen of Diamonds	Princess Dorrie (Family: 5-i)
