= Basil Briscoe =

British horse trainer

Arthur Basil Briscoe (1903 – 1951) was a British racehorse trainer. The son of William Arthur Briscoe, of Longstowe Hall, Cambridgeshire, and May Matilda Boughey, he was educated at Eton College. He ran a mixed stable from the family seat at Longstowe and then Newmarket and was the joint master of the Cambridgeshire Harriers in 1929, based at Bottisham.

== Golden Miller ==
Briscoe discovered Golden Miller as an unbroken three-year-old in Ireland and encouraged Dorothy Paget to buy him. The horse won four consecutive Cheltenham Gold Cups (1932-1935) for Briscoe (and a fifth in 1936) and the 1934 Grand National, but Paget and Briscoe fell out after the 1935 Grand National when Golden Miller, the pre-race favourite, tried to refuse a fence and unseated his jockey.
