= Aubrey Brabazon =

Irish jockey (1920–1996)

Aubrey Brabazon (7 January 1920 – 30 September 1996) was a horse racing jockey born in The Curragh, Ireland.

Brabazon's father, Cecil, was three times Irish champion amateur rider, and from 1927, at his establishment at Rangers Lodge, The Curragh, trained Irish Grand National winners including Pontet (1937) and Jack Chaucer (1940; also won the Red Cross Chase in that year), and Galway Plate winner St Martin (1941; also won the Red Cross Chase in that year). He also trained horses on behalf of the son of American politician Richard "Boss" Croker, including 1932 Epsom Derby 5th and 6th placers Celebrator and Corcy. His horse Sovereign Path won the 1959 Tetrarch Stakes.

His first win came as a 15-year-old on Queen Christina at Phoenix Park. He is most associated with Cottage Rake and Hatton's Grace, both trained by Vincent O'Brien. Cottage Rake ridden by Brabazon won the 1948, 1949 and 1950 Cheltenham Gold Cup. His wins at Cheltenham are credited with making the event popular with Irish race-goers. They also won the Emblem Chase and the King George VI Chase in 1948 and in 1950 won the same race for the third time.

Brabazon rode Hatton's Grace for his first two Champion Hurdles wins in 1949 and 1950 but didn't ride Hatton's Grace when Hatton's Grace won his third Champion Hurdle in 1951. He also rode on the flat. In 1948 he won the Irish Oaks on Masaka and in 1950 won the Irish 2,000 Guineas on Mighty Ocean. In 1946, he had shared the Irish jockeys’ championship with his friend Martin Molony with 30 wins each. He began training in 1961 and, with My Kuda, won the 1966 Ulster Derby.

Brabazon died on 30 September 1996, aged 76. The family business at Rangers Lodge, The Curragh was taken over by his son, Richard, who specialises in pre-training.
