= Silver Fame =

British-bred Thoroughbred racehorse

- Sire: Werwolf
- Grandsire: Hurry On
- Dam: Silver Fairy
- Damsire: He Goes
- Sex: Gelding
- Foaled: 1939
- Country: United Kingdom
- Colour: Chestnut
- Owner: Vivian Smith, 1st Baron Bicester
- Trainer: George Beeby
- Record: 23 wins

Major wins
- Seven Springs Handicap Chase (1948); Golden Miller Chase; Stanley Chase (1950); National Hunt Handicap Chase (1950); Cheltenham Gold Cup (1951)

Silver Fame (foaled 1939) was a British Thoroughbred racehorse who won the 1951 Cheltenham Gold Cup. After beginning his racing career in Ireland he moved to England and became one of the leading steeplechasers of his time. He won races at the Cheltenham Festival in 1948 and 1950 and ran twice in the Grand National, falling when favourite for the race in 1948. Despite running extremely well at Cheltenham he did not contest the Gold Cup until 1951 when he won the race in record time. He was also the oldest winner of the race up to that time, and remains one of only two horses to win the race at the age of twelve. He spent his retirement as a hunter.

== Background ==
Silver Fame was a "big, pale chestnut with a white blaze" bred in the United Kingdom. He was sired by Werwolf, a son of Hurry On and therefore a representative of the Godolphin Arabian sire-line. Werwolf was a very successful National Hunt stallion who also sired the Grand National winner Bogskar and the Champion Hurdler Free Fare. Silver Fame's dam Silver Fairy was a distant female-line descendant of The Oaks winner Cyprian.

During his racing career Silver Fame was owned Vivian Smith, 1st Baron Bicester and trained by George Beeby. Beeby trained the horse at Hamilton House at Compton in Berkshire. Silver Fame's racing style meant that he seldom won by a wide margin but was very difficult to overtake once he took the lead.

== Racing career ==
Silver Fame began his racing career in Ireland and recorded his first success in a bumper at Naas Racecourse in 1943. He was sent to England after the war and developed into a high-class steeplechaser in the late 1940s proving particularly well-suited to courses such as Cheltenham Racecourse (where he won ten times over fences) and Sandown Park. He was less adept over the bigger fences of Aintree Racecourse and never completed any of his races at the Lancashire track. In the 1947 Grand National he started at odds of 33/1 but fell in the race after being hampered by loose horses three fences from the finish. In the following season he won his first five races and was again aimed at the National. At the 1948 Cheltenham Festival he won the £600 Seven Springs Handicap Chase carrying top weight of 175 pounds. He also won the Golden Miller Chase at the same course, over a distance of four miles. In his second attempt at the Grand National he was made the 9/1 favourite, but fell at Becher's Brook on the first circuit.

In 1949 he bypassed the National, running instead in the Champion Chase over two miles seven furlongs at the same course. He was leading and looked likely to win before falling heavily. Silver Fame remained on the ground for some time, leading to fears that he had been fatally injured, but he had only been winded by the fall and quickly recovered. In the following year he defeated Freebooter in the Stanley Chase at Sandown and in March he recorded his second success at the Festival as he carried 175 pounds to victory in the National Hunt Handicap Chase.

Until 1951 Silver Fame had never contested the Cheltenham Gold Cup. For last two renewals Lord Bicester had preferred to rely on Finnure who had finished fourth in 1949 and second in 1950.

On his final start before the Cheltenham Festival Silver Fame was beaten by Lockerbie at Manchester Racecourse, conceding weight to the winner. The weather then turned exceptionally cold and wet and the Cheltenham meeting was abandoned after the first day. The Gold Cup was rescheduled for the next Cheltenham meeting and was run on 25 April, meaning that it took place after the Grand National. Many of the original entrants, including the likely favourite Arctic Gold, did not appear and the race attracted only six runners. Silver Fame, ridden by Martin Molony, started the 6/4 favourite ahead of Lockerbie on 3/1 with the best of the others appearing to be the Queen's horse Manicou (winner of the King George VI Chase) and Freebooter (who had won the 1950 Grand National). The two outsiders were Mighty Fine and Jimmy Rank's eight-year-old Greenogue. Lockerbie took the early lead before Greenogue took over on the second circuit. The field remained closely grouped until first Manicou and then Freebooter weakened leaving four horses still in contention as the field turned into the straight. Lockerbie had regained the advantage and led at the last but quickly began to struggle leaving Silver Fame and Greenogue to fight out the finish. Greenogue appeared to have the slight edge all the way up the run in but Silver Fame, under a strong ride from Molony, drew level in the final strides and was adjudged to have won by a short head. There was no photo-finish at the time in National Hunt racing and there was some criticism of the judge's verdict. He became the oldest horse to win the race, supplanting Thrown In who won as an eleven-year-old in 1927. The winning time of 6:23.4 for three and a quarter miles was a record for the race. Silver Fame's time has never been beaten (as of 2016) although it should be mentioned that the distance of the race has been slightly altered on several occasions.

Silver Fame returned for a final season in 1951/52. He failed to recover his best form: after being beaten at Leicester Racecourse he finished unplaced behind Mont Tremblant in the 1952 Cheltenham Gold Cup.

After the end of his racing career Silver Fame spent several years as a hunter for Lord Bicester.

== Assessment and honours ==
In their book, A Century of Champions, based on the Timeform rating system, John Randall and Tony Morris rated Silver Fame an "average" Gold Cup winner.

== Pedigree ==
Pedigree of Silver Fame (GB), chestnut gelding, 1939
Sire Werwolf (GB) 1919	Hurry On (GB); 1913	Marcovil	Marco
Sire Werwolf (GB) 1919	Hurry On (GB); 1913	Marcovil	Lady Villikins
Sire Werwolf (GB) 1919	Hurry On (GB); 1913	Toute Suite	Sainfoin
Sire Werwolf (GB) 1919	Hurry On (GB); 1913	Toute Suite	Star
Sire Werwolf (GB) 1919	Forest Lassie (GB); 1908	Isinglass	Isonomy
Sire Werwolf (GB) 1919	Forest Lassie (GB); 1908	Isinglass	Dead Lock
Sire Werwolf (GB) 1919	Forest Lassie (GB); 1908	Baroness La Fleche	Ladas
Sire Werwolf (GB) 1919	Forest Lassie (GB); 1908	Baroness La Fleche	La Fleche
Dam Silver Fairy (IRE) 1928	He Goes (GB); 1917	Prince Palatine	Persimmon*
Dam Silver Fairy (IRE) 1928	He Goes (GB); 1917	Prince Palatine	Lady Lightfoot
Dam Silver Fairy (IRE) 1928	He Goes (GB); 1917	Feronia	Fariman
Dam Silver Fairy (IRE) 1928	He Goes (GB); 1917	Feronia	La Carolina
Dam Silver Fairy (IRE) 1928	Fugle Star (IRE); 1917	Fugleman	Persimmon*
Dam Silver Fairy (IRE) 1928	Fugle Star (IRE); 1917	Fugleman	Claque
Dam Silver Fairy (IRE) 1928	Fugle Star (IRE); 1917	Catsmeat	Milner
Dam Silver Fairy (IRE) 1928	Fugle Star (IRE); 1917	Catsmeat	Arum (Family: 23-a)

* Silver Flame is inbred 4D × 4D to the stallion Persimmon, meaning that he appears twice fourth generation on the dam side of his pedigree.
