= Longstowe =

Village in Cambridgeshire, England

Coordinates: 52.183°N 0.083°W

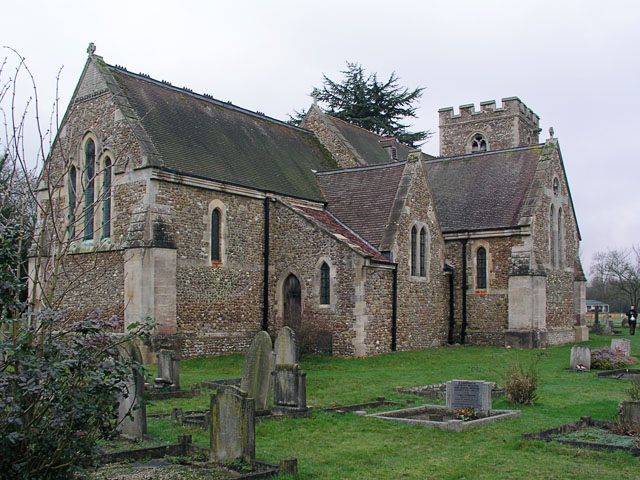
- St Mary's Church, Longstowe

- Location within Cambridgeshire
- Population: 205 (2011)
- OS grid reference: TL310557
- Shire county: Cambridgeshire
- Region: East
- Country: England
- Sovereign state: United Kingdom
- Post town: CAMBRIDGE
- Postcode district: CB23
- Dialling code: 01954

Longstowe is a civil parish and small rural village of nearly 200 residents in South Cambridgeshire, England, 12 miles (19 km) west of Cambridge. The population was measured at 205 at the 2011 census. It is situated on the western side of the A1198 road (Ermine Street), running for about a mile along the B1046.

== History ==
Seventeen people were counted at Longstowe for the 1086 Domesday Book. An area known as 'Town Green' around 1800 may have been the centre of the medieval village which had spread to the south by the middle of the 13th century.

Most of Longstowe's woodland had been cleared by the end of the 13th century, although 40 acres (160,000 m^{2}) were held by the lord of the manor in the 16th century, in addition to furze and heath. The manor was purchased by Anthony Cage the elder in 1571, and he established 'a little park for deer and a warren for conies' around the new house. The acreage of the manor's woodland grew by the end of the 18th century. Until inclosure in 1799, agriculture was carried out in three open fields.

The Varsity Line passed through Longstowe parish to the south of the village although the Great North Road was not important to the village; the settlement reached it only in the late 19th century. The Old North Road railway station was built just over the boundary in Bourn parish and opened in 1862 and encouraged development in the east of the parish.

Longstowe once had three pubs although only the Red House now remains. The Three Horseshoes Inn, built in 1865 and closed in 2001, was renamed after Golden Miller, the Cheltenham Gold Cup and Grand National-winning racehorse which was trained by Basil Briscoe at Longstowe Hall.

In 1801, 175 people lived in the parish; the number rose to 296 in 1891 but dropped again to 218 by 1961.

== Governance ==
Longstowe is represented on the South Cambridgeshire District Council by two councillors for the Gamlingay ward and on Cambridgeshire County Council by one councillor for the Gamlingay electoral division. It is in the parliamentary constituency of South Cambridgeshire in the House of Commons.

== Geography ==
Longstowe is 12 miles (19 km) west of the county town of Cambridge, 11 miles (18 km) south-west of Huntingdon and 47 miles (75 km) north of London. The eastern boundary is marked by the A1198, formerly the Roman Ermine Street (or Old North Road), along which Arrington lies to the south and Caxton to the north. The parish borders Great Gransden in Huntingdonshire. The B1046 runs through Longstowe from Little Gransden in the west to Bourn in the east.

The parish has an area of 1,537 acres (622 hectares) and ranges in height from 50 metres above sea level in the east, to 79 metres in the south-west. The soil is heavy clay with a subsoil of strong clay. It was said in the 17th century that the village was 'unhappy for the want of good water... having neither springs nor brooks to supply that defect'.

== Demography ==
At the time of the 2001 census, Longstowe had 193 residents living in 73 households. All described themselves as White; 73.6% were Christian and 26.4% did not follow a religion or did not state one.

== Landmarks ==
Longstowe Hall is an ancient mansion purchased in the reign of Queen Elizabeth I by the Cage family, who rebuilt it; it was acquired by William Arthur Briscoe in 1906. It stands in a park of about 175 acres (70 hectares) and is now used as a venue for weddings. A lych gate near the church lists the names of the Longstowe men who served in World War I; 'RIP' is inscribed next to the names of those who died.

== Religious sites ==
The parish church is dedicated to St Mary the Virgin and is set back from the road. The church has a chancel, nave, north chapel, south porch, and west tower, all except the late 14th-century tower being rebuilt in 1863–1864. The medieval church originally comprised only a chancel, nave, south porch, and the tower. In 1609 Sir John Cage built a transeptal chapel on the south side of the nave, and his son Anthony built a similar chapel on the north side. By 1727 the south chapel was in ruins and was fenced off in 1779.

The church was rebuilt in 1863–1864 by architect W.M. Fawcett of Cambridge for lord of the manor Sidney Stanley, probably following the old outlines, in red and blue brick with stone dressings. The rector James Rushton and his wife reportedly bore nearly the whole cost of the rebuilding. The surviving monuments and some armorial glass were reset in the north chapel.

The church contains several notable monuments, mostly reset in the north chapel after the 1863-64 rebuilding. The most significant is the early 17th-century tomb-chest of Sir Anthony Cage (d. 1603), originally located in the chancel, featuring two recumbent effigies with ten children kneeling at the front. The lady's effigy is described as smaller and cruder than her companion, and may have originated from a similar but now-destroyed tomb of John Cage and his wife Jocosa (d. 1627).

The north chapel, which became the family vault of the Bovey family, contains a particularly remarkable monument commemorating Sir Ralph Bovey, first Baronet (d. 1679), by the sculptor John Bushnell. Bovey, a lawyer who acquired several estates and was made baronet in 1660, specifically commissioned Bushnell in his will and provided detailed specifications for the design. This extraordinary Carolean resurrection monument depicts Sir Ralph as a half-figure rising from the ocean, grasping an anchor lowered from clouds above, with a Latin inscription meaning "I am immersed in the deep, but the anchor of Christ lifts me up again."

More recent monuments include a memorial to W.A. Briscoe (d. 1934), adapted from a C17 wooden cartouche possibly supplied from Longstowe Hall, and an unusual monument to T.M.P. Bevan (d. 1981) featuring a miniature bronze angel holding up a naked figure on a lettered stone bracket, created by sculptor Hans Feibusch with carving by David Kindersley.

The west window was erected by Mrs. Rushton in memory of her three brothers; she presented a peal of six tubular bells in 1898; after her death two others were added in 1903 as a memorial to her. The chancel east window is a memorial to John Sharp of Manchester and his wife, Dorothea, and was presented by their children in 1864. In 1904 a memorial window was erected to Mrs. Sharp.

The oak lych gate was erected in 1896 by the widow of the Rev. James Rushton M.A., who was rector at Longstowe between 1852 and 1895. A rood was erected in 1920 as a memorial to Longstowe men who were killed in World War I.

== Recreation ==
The village supports a successful cricket club with both A and B teams competing in the Cambridgeshire leagues.

== Notable people ==
- Christian Cowan (born 1995), fashion designer, grew up at Longstowe Hall
