= 2026 Cheltenham Gold Cup =

Horse race in Britain

- Cheltenham Gold Cup
- Location: Cheltenham Racecourse
- Date: 13 March 2026
- Winning horse: Gaelic Warrior
- Starting price: 11/4JF
- Jockey: Paul Townend
- Trainer: Willie Mullins
- Owner: Rich Ricci
- Conditions: Good to soft

The 2026 Cheltenham Gold Cup (known as the Boodles Cheltenham Gold Cup for sponsorship reasons) was the 98th annual running of the Cheltenham Gold Cup horse race and was held at Cheltenham Racecourse, Gloucestershire, England, on 13 March 2026.

The race was won by 11/4JF Gaelic Warrior, owned by Rich Ricci, trained by Willie Mullins and ridden by Paul Townend.

Gaelic Warrior won the race eight lengths clear of Jango Baie. It was a record equalling fifth win in the race for trainer Willie Mullins, and also a record fifth win for jockey Paul Townend.

The race, which is run on the final day of the Cheltenham Festival was shown live on ITV Racing.
