= Halloween (horse) =

British racehorse

- Sire: Court Nez
- Grandsire: Bosworth
- Dam: My Blue Heaven
- Damsire: Tai Yang
- Sex: Gelding
- Foaled: 1945
- Country: United Kingdom
- Colour: Brown
- Owner: Captain R.B. Smalley; Contessa di Sant Elia
- Trainer: Bill Wightman

Major wins
- Foxhunters Challenge Cup (1951); Hurst Park Grand National Trial Chase (1952); Grand Sefton Trial Chase (1952); Cottage Rake Handicap Chase; King George VI Chase (1952, 1954); Charlton Park Handicap Chase (1954); Ewell Chase (1954); Coventry Handicap Chase (1955)

Halloween (foaled 1945) was a British National Hunt horse best known for being the first horse to win two King George VI Chases and for being placed four times in the Cheltenham Gold Cup without winning the race. Racing during the 1950s, he and another British chaser, Galloway Braes, had a competitive rivalry and were extremely popular with racing fans.

== Breeding ==
Halloween was born in 1945 and had fairly undistinguished breeding. His sire, Court Nez, was a descendant of leading sire Dark Ronald and his dam, My Blue Heaven, was a granddaughter of 1925 St Leger winner Solario. Halloween was a small brown gelding with a white star on his forehead.

== Racing career ==
=== Early career ===
Halloween was bought by Captain R. B. Smalley for £90 and ridden by him in point to points. In 1951, he was transferred to hunter chases and put into training with Bill Wightman. Ridden by Smalley, Halloween recorded five victories from as many starts in the spring of that year. He made his debut at Windsor, where he won the three-mile Foxhunters Trial Chase by three lengths. He then won three races at Sandown and Worcester by five, six, and eight lengths before winning the Foxhunters Challenge Cup at the Cheltenham Festival.

After his victory, Halloween was sold to Contessa di Sant Elia for £8000. He was considered champion hunter-chaser for the year 1950/51.

=== 1951/52 Season ===
Halloween was switched to chasing in the autumn of 1951, where he was expected to continue his progression. However, he was a quirky individual and did not respond well to his new jockeys. In his first two races at Hurst and Newbury, he unseated both Dick Francis and D. Dartnall before he was reunited with Captain Smalley, who knew how to ride the horse effectively. Halloween and Smalley won two chases for amateur riders before Wightman offered the ride to Fred Winter. Winter consulted with Smalley and realised that Halloween hated being pushed about by his jockey. With that in mind, Winter left Halloween to make his own running, and the pair won the Hurst Park Grand National Trial by eight lengths. As Winter clearly understood the horse, Wightman offered him a retainer of £250 to ride Halloween.

=== 1952/53 Season ===
The partnership of Halloween and Winter brought instant success the following season. Showing marked improvement, Halloween started his campaign by defeating the top-class chaser Galloway Braes by ten lengths in the Grand Sefton Trial at Hurst Park. He followed up that victory with a win in the Cottage Rake Handicap Chase at Kempton a month later, beating Air Wedding by four lengths.

That triumph acted as a trial for the prestigious King George VI Chase at Kempton in late December. The field also contained Mont Tremblant (the winner of the 1952 Cheltenham Gold Cup, the extremely versatile Irish chaser Knock Hard, Galloway Braes, Teal (winner of the 1952 Grand National), and top novice chaser Wenceslaus, amongst others. The field went round at a good gallop, with Galloway Braes taking the lead at the eighth fence. Although Halloween made up ground on the final bend, Mont Tremblant looked sure to win approaching the final fence. However, an excellent leap by Halloween saw him go a length up, and although Mont Tremblant battled back, he couldn’t regain the lead.

Halloween prepped for the Cheltenham Gold Cup in the Herne the Hunter Handicap Chase at Windsor, where he conceded 2 stone 2 lbs in weight to Air Wedding and beat him by three quarters of a length.

The Gold Cup featured many horses from the King George as well as E.S.B., who went on to win the infamous 1956 renewal of the Grand National. Halloween was dwarfed by his larger rivals in the ring but finished second, beaten five lengths, to Knock Hard. Halloween passed Galloway Braes on the run in and ‘looked like he could go round again’.

=== 1953/54 Season ===
Jockey Fred Winter broke his leg and was out of action for most of the year. Deprived of the rider who knew him best, Halloween won only his debut, beating former Cheltenham Gold Cup winner Cottage Rake (then a 14-year-old) over two miles at Wincanton.

Halloween then finished second to Stormhead (well beaten in the previous year’s King George) in the Emblem Chase at Manchester, fourth to old rival Galloway Braes (who posted a record-breaking victory) in the King George, and third to Mont Tremblant in the Grand International Chase at Sandown. In the Cheltenham Gold Cup, he was third to Four Ten and Mariners Log after finishing well.

Halloween ran three more times that season in the Sussex Chase (second to Gay Donald while conceding over a stone), Welsh Grand National (fourth under M. Scudamore) and the prestigious Queen Elizabeth Steeplechase at Hurst Park, where Galloway Braes recorded his second consecutive win in the race and ran the fastest three-mile-chase ever recorded.

=== 1954/55 Season ===
The autumn saw Halloween reunited with Fred Winter. After a second in the Grand Sefton Trial Handicap, the pair won the Charlton Park Handicap Chase at Cheltenham and the Ewell Chase at Sandown.

Up against a good field in the King George, including favoured Galloway Braes, Gold Cup second Mariner’s Log, and prolific-winning chaser Crudwell, Halloween won, beating Galloway Braes by six lengths. In the process, he became the first horse to win two renewals of the King George.

Halloween confirmed the form with Galloway Braes in the Coventry Handicap Chase (a forerunner to the BetBright Chase) the following month, before making a third attempt at the Gold Cup. Rated the second favourite, Halloween finished second to the outsider Gay Donald, who built up a commanding lead from the start to win by ten lengths.

His final run of the season came in the Queen Elizabeth Chase, where both he and rival Galloway Braes ran below form behind Limb Of Law.

=== 1955/56 Season ===
Halloween had a truncated season after injuring himself in the Cottage Rake Handicap when a head second to Pointsman, and missing the King George. He was second and third in two races at Sandown and Newbury, giving three stone to the winner in the latter, before running in the Gold Cup for the fourth time. Although he looked well and on his toes in the paddock, Halloween finished third behind Limber Hill.

=== 1956/57 Season ===
Halloween ran only twice more, finishing second in the Bury Steeplechase at Fontwell and third behind 1953 Grand National winner Early Mist in the Brocas Chase at Windsor.

== Retirement ==
After his loss at Windsor, Halloween was found to be suffering from heart problems and was subsequently retired. His longterm rival Galloway Braes was killed when falling in that year’s King George, and Gold Cup winner Limber Hill broke down and never ran again.
