= Golden Miller =

Irish-bred Thoroughbred racehorse

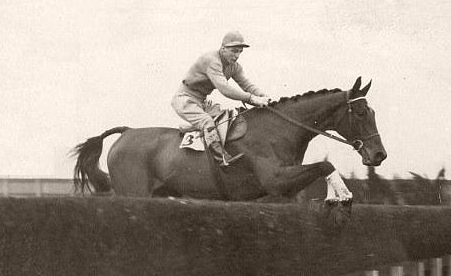
- Sire: Goldcourt
- Grandsire: Goldminer
- Dam: Millers Pride
- Damsire: Wavelets Pride
- Sex: Gelding
- Foaled: 30 April 1927
- Country: Ireland
- Colour: Bay
- Breeder: Laurence Geraghty
- Owner: Philip W. Carr; Dorothy Paget (1931)
- Trainer: Basil Briscoe; Owen Anthony
- Record: 52: 29-7-6

Major wins
- Cheltenham Gold Cup (1932, 1933, 1934, 1935, 1936); Grand National (1934)
- Last updated on 18 January 2011

Golden Miller (1927–1957) was a Thoroughbred racehorse who is the most successful Cheltenham Gold Cup horse ever, winning the race in five consecutive years between 1932 and 1936. He also is the only horse to win both of the United Kingdom's premier steeplechase races - the Cheltenham Gold Cup and the Grand National - in the same year (1934).

== Breeding ==
Golden Miller was bred at the yard of Laurence Geraghty, grandfather of jockey Barry Geraghty, in Pelletstown, Co. Meath, Ireland in 1927. He was sired by the unraced Goldcourt, who stood at a stud fee of five guineas and sired two Irish Grand National winners. His dam, Miller's Pride, was an ex-hunter who was placed and the dam of the good steeplechaser May Crescent. Her sire, Wavelet's Pride, won the Great Metropolitan Stakes, a hurdle race, and other races before he became a top jumper sire.

Golden Miller had already changed hands a couple of times when a young trainer from Longstowe, Cambridgeshire, Basil Briscoe, bought him for 500 guineas.

== Racing record ==
As a three year old Golden Miller ran in a hurdle race at Southwell. Briscoe then took him hunting but this did not appeal to Golden Miller. He began to improve, though, and after a narrow defeat in a steeplechase at Newbury, he was bought by Mr Philip Carr, father of a Nottinghamshire cricketer, Arthur Carr, for £1,000. The new owner died soon afterwards and Golden Miller was sold for £6,000 to Miss Dorothy Paget, who had just engaged Basil Briscoe as her private trainer.

Golden Miller therefore returned to Basil Briscoe. Dorothy Paget was the British flat racing Champion Owner in 1943, and the leading National Hunt owner in 1933–34, 1940–41 and 1951–52.

In 1931, Golden Miller made his steeplechasing debut at Newbury where he finished first, only to be disqualified for carrying incorrect weight. On 30 December, he won the Reading Chase before winning the Sefton Steeplechase on 20 January 1932.

=== Golden Miller's five victories in the Cheltenham Gold Cup - 1932 to 1936 ===
1932

Golden Miller was five years old and trained by Basil Briscoe when he ran in the Gold Cup in 1932. He had run in only four steeplechases, winning three (though disqualified in one on technical grounds) and finishing a close second in the other. It was a good record but it was felt he was rather young to compete against seasoned chasers in the Gold Cup, so his starting price was 13/2. Grakle was favourite at 10/11.

In 1932 the Cheltenham fences were much stiffer than usual, because the Inspector of Courses had ordered six inches to be taken off each fence before the first day of the meeting. Fifty-six horses fell during the three days, and an amateur rider, Count Louis Bernheim, was killed when Summer Song came down.

In the Gold Cup, Aruntius made a bad mistake at the fence after the water jump. Kingsford, just behind, was unsighted and had a fatal fall. Grakle, the favourite, ridden by Mr Jack Fawcus, cleared the fence but swerved to avoid Kingsford and unseated Mr Fawcus. After this grief, Golden Miller's task was much easier, and he won by four lengths from Inverse and Aruntius.

In "The History of Steeplechasing", published in 1966, Roger Mortimer comments that "It took some little time for the racing public to accept Golden Miller as the great horse that he was because he lacked the almost insolent panache of Easter Hero. In a race he was inclined to be idle, while his jumping was quick and economical rather than brilliantly spectacular. He was accustomed to jump off his forehand and was therefore not the ideal horse for Aintree. His class and cleverness, combined with courage and stamina, earned him one Grand National, but in fact he was essentially a park course type. Cheltenham was a track that suited him to perfection, his long stride and apparently boundless stamina earning a rich dividend in that stiff uphill climb to the winning post."

1933

Golden Miller had improved in the year since his first Gold Cup win. He had been very impressive in winning the Troytown Chase at Lingfield carrying 12 st 10 lbs. He started at 4/7 in the Gold Cup. His opponents included good horses such as Kellsboro' Jack (who won the Grand National about two weeks later), Thomond II and Delaneige, but he won easily by ten lengths, ridden by Billy Stott.

1934

The Grand National was the main target for Golden Miller. He had a new jockey, Gerry Wilson, with whom he won a race at Lingfield in November 1933. beating Thomond II. But a month after that Thomond II got his revenge when beating Golden Miller at Kempton. In January, at Hurst Park, Golden Miller was beaten by Southern Hero to whom he was giving 28 lbs.

Thomond II did not run in the Gold Cup, for which Golden Miller started at 6/5. There was a lot of support for the seven-year-old El Hadjar, who had won the Coventry Chase at Kempton. El Hadjar and Kellsboro' Jack moved up to challenge Golden Miller three fences from home, but El Hadjar fell and Kellsboro' Jack could not sustain his effort, leaving Golden Miller to win by six lengths from Avenger.

Seventeen days later Golden Miller put up the finest performance of his career by winning the Grand National in record time with 12 st 2lbs.

1935

Once again, the Grand National was Golden Miller's main objective. He seemed as good as ever when winning the 3m 5f Grand International Chase at Sandown, carrying 12 st 7 lbs, conceding 14 lbs to Delaneige.

In the Gold Cup, Golden Miller started at 1/2 favourite. His four opponents were Thomond II, Kellsboro' Jack, Southern Hero and Avenger. There was an enormous crowd on a sunny day. The going was fast, and there was a fierce gallop from the start. By the final fence, Golden Miller and Thomond II had drawn clear of the rest and landed together. There was a fierce tussle up the run in, but Golden Miller managed to win his fourth Gold Cup by three quarters of a length. Roger Mortimer comments that, "It was the hardest race of Golden Miller's career and his light never shone so brightly again."

1936

Golden Miller had a new trainer this year - Owen Anthony. In December 1935 he won a National Hunt flat race. In the same month, carrying 12 st 10 lbs and ridden by Gerry Wilson, he won a two-mile chase at Newbury in great style. In February he returned to the same course, ridden again by Wilson, to run in a three-mile chase. But he was well below his best and ran out five fences from home. In the aftermath of this race it was announced that Evan Williams would ride Golden Miller in the Gold Cup instead of Gerry Wilson.

Golden Miller's task in the Gold Cup was made easier by Thomond II's absence, and he started at 21/20 favourite. On his favourite course he won in his old style by twelve lengths from Royal Mail, ridden by Fulke Walwyn.

In 1937 there was no Cheltenham Gold Cup because of the weather, so Golden Miller had to wait until 1938 to attempt to win it for the sixth time. Although he was in his twelfth year, he started at 7/4 favourite. Ridden by 'Frenchie' Nicholson, he was just in front at the last fence, but the speed of the younger Morse Code, ridden by Danny Morgan, was too much for him on the run-in and he was beaten by two lengths.

=== Golden Miller and the Grand National ===
1933

In 1933, as a six-year-old and winner of two Cheltenham Gold Cups, he started as the 9/1 favourite in the Grand National. He was ridden by Ted Leader, and well placed on the second circuit when he made a bad mistake at Becher's. He recovered well but fell at the Canal Turn. The race was won by the seven-year-old Kellsboro' Jack, ridden by Dudley Williams, trained by Ivor Anthony.

1934

The following year, in the 1934 Grand National, Golden Miller, carrying 12 st 2 lbs, started at 8/1 second favourite. The favourite, Really True, fell at the 26th fence when going well. Golden Miller was ridden by one of the best steeplechase jockeys of the 1930s, Gerry Wilson. At the last fence, Delaneige landed first, but Golden Miller produced a turn of speed and drew clear to beat Delaneige (11st 6 lbs) by five lengths, with Thomond II (12 st 4 lbs) third and the 1932 winner Forbra (11 st 7 lbs) fourth. Golden Miller set a new course record of 9 min 20.4s for Aintree. This victory in the 'National' came in the middle of five consecutive Gold Cup victories, a Gold Cup record.

1935

Golden Miller was given 12 st 7 lbs to carry in the 1935 Grand National. He started at 2/1. Sadly, the great horse did not complete a circuit. At the 10th fence, the one after Valentine's, he screwed badly to the left taking off (some thought he tried to refuse) and landed awkwardly, parting company with Gerry Wilson. It was a long way from the stands so many spectators were dismayed when Golden Miller was absent when the runners came on to the racecourse proper. The race was won by Reynoldstown (11 st 4 lbs), ridden by Mr Frank Furlong, at 22/1.

After the race Golden Miller was examined by vets who could find nothing wrong with him, so it was decided to run him in the Champion Chase the following day (the Grand National was run on Friday until the 1950s). He made a mess of the first fence and unseated Gerry Wilson. As Golden Miller was led back to the paddock there was much booing from the stands.

In the following week there were rumours about Golden Miller and his connections. The horse's owner, Dorothy Paget and jockey Gerry Wilson had a less than amicable relationship with the trainer, Basil Briscoe. Miss Paget moved Golden Miller and six other horses from Briscoe to Donald Snow. Miss Paget moved Golden Miller again, in August 1935 to Owen Anthony, where he statyed for the rest of his racing career.

1936

Golden Miller fell at the first fence. Reynoldstown (10/1) won his second successive Grand National carrying 12st 2 lbs, this time ridden by Mr Fulke Walwyn.

1937

Golden Miller ran in his 5th Grand National. He was still only ten years old, and despite failing in the previous two years, the public made him 8/1 favourite. However, Golden Miller by now appeared to dislike Aintree and he refused on the first circuit. The winner was Royal Mail, with Evan Williams up. He carried 11 st 13 lbs, with a starting price of 100/6.

In the course of his racing career Golden Miller had seventeen jockeys, fifteen professionals and two amateurs, Mr Hector Gordon and Mr Robin Mount.

He retired in 1939, having won 29 of his 52 starts with winnings of £15,000. He is buried at Elsenham Stud, a working farm in Elsenham in north-west Essex.

== Honours ==
Fred Varney, a bricklayer, bought a ticket in the Irish sweepstakes and drew Golden Miller. A bookmaker bought a half share in Fred's ticket for £3,000. When Golden Miller won, he won the top prize of £30,000. He had to give the bookmakers £15,000, which left Fred with £18,000. With the winnings, Fred and his son-in-law founded a coach company and named it Golden Miller Coaches after the horse. After many years, the company was bought and renamed Tellings-Golden Miller. Many of the firm's coaches have a portrait of the horse on the front or side of the vehicle.

A statue of Golden Miller was erected near the parade ring at Cheltenham Racecourse. The racehorse weather vane on top of Hucknall Library, in Nottinghamshire, commemorates Golden Miller: the library was funded by Edward Shipley Ellis and William Paget, two of the partners in the Hucknall Colliery Company.

== Pedigree ==
Pedigree of Golden Miller (IRE), bay gelding, 1927
Sire Goldcourt (GB) 1913	Goldminer (GB); 1904	Gallinule	Isonomy*
Sire Goldcourt (GB) 1913	Goldminer (GB); 1904	Gallinule	Moorhen
Sire Goldcourt (GB) 1913	Goldminer (GB); 1904	Seek and Find	Goldseeker
Sire Goldcourt (GB) 1913	Goldminer (GB); 1904	Seek and Find	Bide-A-Wee
Sire Goldcourt (GB) 1913	Powerscourt (GB); 1892	Atheling	Sterling*
Sire Goldcourt (GB) 1913	Powerscourt (GB); 1892	Atheling	King Tom mare
Sire Goldcourt (GB) 1913	Powerscourt (GB); 1892	Waterfall	Arbitrator
Sire Goldcourt (GB) 1913	Powerscourt (GB); 1892	Waterfall	Millwheel
Dam Miller's Pride (IRE) 1909	Wavelet's Pride (GB); 1897	Fernandez	Sterling*
Dam Miller's Pride (IRE) 1909	Wavelet's Pride (GB); 1897	Fernandez	Isola Bella*
Dam Miller's Pride (IRE) 1909	Wavelet's Pride (GB); 1897	Wavelet	Paul Jones
Dam Miller's Pride (IRE) 1909	Wavelet's Pride (GB); 1897	Wavelet	Wanda
Dam Miller's Pride (IRE) 1909	Miller's Daughter (GB); 1900	Queen's Birthday	Hagioscope
Dam Miller's Pride (IRE) 1909	Miller's Daughter (GB); 1900	Queen's Birthday	Matilda
Dam Miller's Pride (IRE) 1909	Miller's Daughter (GB); 1900	Allan Water	Barcaldine
Dam Miller's Pride (IRE) 1909	Miller's Daughter (GB); 1900	Allan Water	Thirlmere (Family: 16-b)

* Golden Miller is inbred 5S x 4S x 4D to the stallion Sterling, meaning that he appears fifth generation (via Isonomy) and fourth generation on the sire side of his pedigree, and fourth generation on the dam side of his pedigree.

* Golden Miller is inbred 5S x 4D to the mare Isola Bella, meaning that she appears fifth generation (via Isonomy) on the sire side of his pedigree, and fourth generation on the dam side of his pedigree.

== See also ==
- List of racehorses
- Repeat winners of horse races
