= 1989 Cheltenham Gold Cup =

The 1989 Cheltenham Gold Cup was a horse race which took place at Cheltenham on Thursday 16 March 1989. It was the 62nd running of the Cheltenham Gold Cup, and it was won by the pre-race favourite Desert Orchid. The winner was ridden by Simon Sherwood and trained by David Elsworth.

The race was later voted the "Greatest Race of All Time" in a Racing Post poll, ahead of the 1973 Grand National and the 1975 King George VI and Queen Elizabeth Stakes.

Yahoo jumps from Desert Orchid, but Desert Orchid, is rallying, he's trying to come again towards the near side. It's Yahoo on the far side, Dessert Orchid towards the near side, Desert Orchid's accelerating as the come to the last. Yahoo on the far side, Desert Orchid on the near side. It's Desert Orchid on the near side, Yahoo on the far side, Desert Orchid drifting over towards the stand side, he's beginning to get up. Desert Orchid is beginning to get up as the race towards the line, there's a tremendous cheer from the crowd as Desert Orchid is going to win it! Desert Orchid has won the Gold Cup! Yahoo is second, third is Charter Party. Simon Sherwood punches the air, Dessie's has done it!

— Commentator Peter O'Sullevan describes the climax of the race

== Race details ==
- Sponsor: Tote
- Winner's prize money: £66,635.00
- Going: Heavy
- Number of runners: 13
- Winner's time: 7m 17.6s

== Full result ==
	*	Horse	Age	Jockey	Trainer ^{†}	SP
1		Desert Orchid	10	Simon Sherwood	David Elsworth	5/2 fav
2	1½	Yahoo	8	Tom Morgan	John Edwards	25/1
3	8	Charter Party	11	Richard Dunwoody	David Nicholson	14/1
4	dist	Bonanza Boy	8	Peter Scudamore	Martin Pipe	15/2
5	dist	West Tip	12	Peter Hobbs	Michael Oliver	66/1
Ref	Fence 22	Cavvies Clown	9	Ross Arnott	David Elsworth	8/1
PU	Fence 22	Pegwell Bay	8	Carl Llewellyn	Tim Forster	25/1
BD	Fence 20	Ballyhane	8	Richard Rowe	Josh Gifford	50/1
Fell	Fence 20	Ten Plus	9	Kevin Mooney	Fulke Walwyn	11/2
Fell	Fence 17	Slalom	8	John White	Michael Robinson	33/1
Fell	Fence 10	The Thinker	11	Chris Grant	Arthur Stephenson	15/2
Fell	Fence 7	Carvill's Hill	7	Ken Morgan	Jim Dreaper (IRE)	5/1
Fell	Fence 6	Golden Freeze	7	Brendan Sheridan	Jumbo Wilkinson	16/1

* The distances between the horses are shown in lengths or shorter. Ref = refused; PU = pulled-up; BD = brought down.
† Trainers are based in Great Britain unless indicated.

== Winner's details ==
Further details of the winner, Desert Orchid:

- Foaled: 11 April 1979 in Great Britain
- Sire: Grey Mirage; Dam: Flower Child (Brother)
- Owner: Richard Burridge
- Breeder: James Burridge
