= Great Yorkshire Chase =

Steeplechase horse race in Britain

Sky Bet Chase
2026
Dartmoor Pirate	New Order	Walking On Air

Previous years
2025
Docpickedme	The Changing Man	Snipe
2024
Annual Invictus	Forward Plan	Charlie Uberalles
2023
Cooper's Cross	Cap Du Nord	Elvis Mail
2022
Windsor Avenue	Storm Control	Cap Du Nord
2021
Takingrisks	Aye Right	Cap Du Nord

2020-2011
2020
Ok Corral	Fingerontheswitch	Chidswell
2019
Go Conquer	Monbeg River	Calipto
2018
Wakanda	Warriors Tale	L'Ami Serge
2017
Ziga Boy	Looking Well	Another Hero
2016
Ziga Boy	Coologue	Buywise
2015
If in Doubt	Baileys Concerto	Night in Milan
2014
The Rainbow Hunter	Baile Anrai	Unioniste
2012
Calgary Bay	Shakalakaboomboom	Fruity O'Rooney

2010-2001
2009
Big Fella Thanks	Ungaro	Native Coral
2008
An Accordion	Ungaro	Ma Yahab
2007
Simon	Ardaghey	Mount Clerigo
2006
A Glass in Thyne	Europa	Keltic Bard
2005
Colourful Life	Tikram	Run For Paddy
2004
Tyneandthyneagain	Magical Bailiwick	Gottabe
2003
Barryscourt Lad	Ryalux	Tonoco
2002
Moor Lane	Kit Smartie	Frenchman's Creek
2001
Heidi III	Inn at the Top	King on the Run

2000-1991
2000
Beau	Niki Dee	Village King
1999
Major Bell	Mr Strong Gale	Cab on Target
1998
Speaker Weatherill	In Truth	Linton Rocks
1997
General Command	King Lucifer	Golden Spinner
1996
Addington Boy	Merry Master	Pims Gunner
1994
Carbisdale	Avonburn	Gnome's Tycoon
1993
Young Hustler	Otterburn House	Rowlandsons Jewels
1991
Dalkey Sound	Team Challenge	Docklands Express

1990-1988
1990
Man O'Magic	Fleming	Rowlandsons Jewels
1989
Proverity	Dinny Walsh	Roll-A-Joint
1988
Bob Tisdall	Sir Jest	Fair Child

The Great Yorkshire Chase is a Premier Handicap National Hunt handicap chase in England which is open to horses aged five years or older. It is run at Doncaster over a distance of 3 miles (4,828 metres), and it is scheduled to take place each year in January.

The race was first run in 1948. Until 2023 it was sponsored by Sky Bet and known as the Sky Bet Handicap Chase. The race held Listed status until 2022 and was re-classified as a Premier Handicap from the 2023 running when Listed status was removed from handicap races.

== Records ==
Most successful horse (2 wins):

- Ziga Boy – 2016, 2017

Most successful jockey (3 wins):

- Tim Molony – Arctic Gold (1951), Knock Hard (1953), ESB (1957)

Most successful trainer (4 wins):

- Fred Rimell – Old Morality (1949), ESB (1957), Nicolaus Silver (1962), Rough House (1975)

== Winners ==
Year	Winner	Age	Weight	Jockey	Trainer
1948	Cool Customer	9	12-07	Joe Murphy	Jack Fawcus
1949	Old Morality	7	10-01	Bob Turnell	Fred Rimell
1950	Freebooter	9	11-11	Jimmy Power	Bobby Renton
1951	Arctic Gold	6	11-00	Tim Molony	Gerald Balding
1952	Abandoned due to death of King George VI
1953	Knock Hard	9	11-07	Tim Molony	Vincent O'Brien
1954	Abandoned due to frost
1955	Bramble Tudor	7	11-03	Dick Curran	John Wright
1956	Abandoned due to frost and snow
1957	ESB	11	11-10	Tim Molony	Fred Rimell
1958	Hall Weir	8	10-10	Bill Rees	Frank Cundell
1959	Abandoned due to frost
1960	Knightsbrook	8	11-01	George Slack	Charlie Hall
1961	Chavara	8	10-07	Stan Mellor	George Owen
1962	Nicolaus Silver	10	11-09	Bobby Beasley	Fred Rimell
1963	Abandoned due to frost
1964	King's Nephew	10	11-10	Stan Mellor	Frank Cundell
1965	King of Diamonds	7	10-04	John Kenneally	George Vergette
1966	Freddie	9	11-07	Pat McCarron	Reg Tweedie
1967	Spear Fir	8	10-06	John Leech	Bobby Fairbairn
1968	Sixty Nine	8	12-00	Brian Fletcher	Denys Smith
1969	Playlord	8	11-06	Ron Barry	Gordon W. Richards
1970	Freddie Boy	9	11-03	Richard Pitman	Fred Winter
1971	Two Springs	9	10-10	Roy Edwards	George Owen
1972	Slaves Dream	8	10-06	Michael Dickinson	R Hall
1973	Charlie Potheen	8	11-10	Terry Biddlecombe	Fulke Walwyn
1974	Cuckolder	9	10-01	Andy Turnell	Bob Turnell
1975	Rough House	9	10-05	John Burke	Fred Rimell
1976	Abandoned due to frost
1977	Abandoned due to frost
1978	Autumn Rain	7	10-02	Colin Tinkler	Tony Dickinson
1979	Abandoned due to snow
1980	Jer	9	10-00	Phil Tuck	P Bevan
1981	Tragus	9	10–13	Bob Davies	David Morley
1982	Bregawn	8	11-06	John Francome	Michael Dickinson
1983	Get Out of Me Way	8	10-00	Paul Barton	Graham Thorner
1984	Abandoned due to snow
1985	Abandoned due to frost and snow
1986	Abandoned due to frost
1987	Abandoned due to frost
1988	Bob Tisdall	9	12-05	Tom Morgan	John Edwards
1989	Proverity	8	11-08	Tom Morgan	John Edwards
1990	Man O'Magic	9	11-10	Mark Perrett	Kim Bailey
1991	Dalkey Sound	8	10-09	Peter Niven	Mary Reveley
1992	Abandoned due to frost
1993	Young Hustler	6	10-00	David Bridgwater	Nigel Twiston-Davies
1994	Carbisdale	8	11-04	Peter Niven	Mary Reveley
1995	Abandoned due to snow
1996	Addington Boy	8	10-08	Mark Dwyer	Gordon W. Richards
1997	General Command	9	11-10	Paul Carberry	Gordon W. Richards
1998	Speaker Weatherill	9	11-11	Mark Brennan	Owen Brennan
1999	Major Bell	11	10-00	Adrian Maguire	Alistair Whillans
2000	Beau	7	11-00	Tom Jenks	Nigel Twiston-Davies
2001	Heidi III	6	10-02	Dean Gallagher	Mickey Hammond
2002	Moor Lane	10	10-04	Barry Fenton	Ian Balding
2003	Barryscourt Lad	9	10-01	Rodi Greene	Martin Pipe
2004	Tyneandthyneagain	9	10-04	Henry Oliver	Richard Guest
2005	Colourful Life	9	10–12	Joe Tizzard	Paul Nicholls
2006 (Note: The 2006 and 2007 runnings took place at Southwell)	A Glass in Thyne	8	10–12	Andrew Thornton	Ben Pollock
2007	Simon	8	11-02	Andrew Thornton	John Spearing
2008	An Accordion	7	10-08	Johnny Farrelly	David Pipe
2009	Big Fella Thanks	7	11-02	Christian Williams	Paul Nicholls
2010	Abandoned due to frost
2011	Abandoned due to frost
2012	Calgary Bay	9	11-11	Dominic Elsworth	Henrietta Knight
2013	Abandoned due to frost
2014	The Rainbow Hunter	10	10-09	Nick Scholfield	Kim Bailey
2015	If in Doubt	7	10–11	Tony McCoy	Philip Hobbs
2016	Ziga Boy	7	10-01	Brendan Powell Jr	Alan King
2017	Ziga Boy	8	10–11	Tom Bellamy	Alan King
2018	Wakanda	9	11–00	Henry Brooke	Sue Smith
2019	Go Conquer	10	11–10	Tom Bellamy	Nigel Twiston-Davies
2020	Ok Corral	10	11–12	Derek O'Connor (Note: amateur jockey)	Nicky Henderson
2021	Takingrisks	12	11–02	Sean Quinlan	Nicky Richards
2022	Windsor Avenue	10	11–01	Sean Quinlan	Brian Ellison
2023	Cooper's Cross	8	10–06	Sam Coltherd	Stuart Coltherd
2024	Annual Invictus	9	10–12	Freddie Gordon	Chris Gordon
2025	Docpickedme	9	10–09	Charlie Maggs	Richard Hobson
2026	Dartmoor Pirate	7	10–12	Rex Dingle	Anthony Honeyball

== See also ==
- List of British National Hunt races
- Horseracing in Great Britain

== Sources ==
- Racing Post
  - 1988, 1989, 1990, 1991, 1993, 1994, 1996, 1997, 1998, 1999
  - 2000, 2001, 2002, 2003, 2004, 2005, 2006, 2007, 2008, 2009
  - 2012, 2014, 2015, 2016, 2017, 2018, 2019, 2020, 2021, 2022
  - 2023, 2024
