= 1990 Cheltenham Gold Cup =

1990 horse race

The 1990 Cheltenham Gold Cup was a horse race which took place at Cheltenham on Thursday March 15, 1990. It was the 63rd running of the Cheltenham Gold Cup, and it was won by Norton's Coin. The winner was ridden by Graham McCourt and trained by Sirrel Griffiths. The pre-race favourite Desert Orchid finished third.

With a starting price of 100/1, Norton's Coin became the longest-odds winner in the race's history; he had only been entered due a mistake over the deadline for another race. He was the second winner to be trained in Wales – the first was Patron Saint in 1928.

== Race details ==
- Sponsor: Tote
- Winner's prize money: £67,003.40
- Going: Good to Firm
- Number of runners: 12
- Winner's time: 6m 30.9s (new record)

== Full result ==
	*	Horse	Age	Jockey	Trainer ^{†}	SP
1		Norton's Coin	9	Graham McCourt	Sirrel Griffiths	100/1
2	¾	Toby Tobias	8	Mark Pitman	Jenny Pitman	8/1
3	4	Desert Orchid	11	Richard Dunwoody	David Elsworth	10/11 fav
4	7	Cavvies Clown	10	Graham Bradley	David Elsworth	10/1
5	12	Pegwell Bay	9	Brendan Powell	Tim Forster	20/1
6	1	Maid of Money (mare)	8	Anthony Powell	John Fowler (IRE)	25/1
7	15	Yahoo	9	Tom Morgan	John Edwards	40/1
8	2½	Bonanza Boy	9	Peter Scudamore	Martin Pipe	15/2
Fell	Fence 21	Ten of Spades	10	Kevin Mooney	Fulke Walwyn	20/1
PU	Fence 17	The Bakewell Boy	8	Steve Smith Eccles	Richard Frost	200/1
Fell	Fence 15	Kildimo	10	Jimmy Frost	Toby Balding	50/1
PU	Fence 12	Nick the Brief	8	Martin Lynch	John Upson	10/1

* The distances between the horses are shown in lengths or shorter. PU = pulled-up.
† Trainers are based in Great Britain unless indicated.

== Winner's details ==
Further details of the winner, Norton's Coin:

- Foaled: 1981 in Great Britain
- Sire: Mount Cassino; Dam: Grove Chance (St Columbus)
- Owner: Sirrel Griffiths
- Breeder: G. P. Thomas
