= Mont Tremblant (horse) =

French-bred Thoroughbred racehorse

- Sire: Gris Perle
- Grandsire: Brabant
- Dam: Paltoquette
- Damsire: Tom Pinch
- Sex: Gelding
- Foaled: 1946
- Country: France
- Colour: Chestnut
- Breeder: François Dupré
- Owner: François Dupré; Dorothy Paget
- Trainer: Fulke Walwyn

Major wins
- Cheltenham Gold Cup (1952); Stanley Chase (1952)

Mont Tremblant (foaled 1946) was a French-bred, British-trained Thoroughbred racehorse who won the 1952 Cheltenham Gold Cup. Originally trained in France, he was switched to a British stable and made an immediate impact, defeating a strong field to win the Gold Cup as a six-year-old. In the following season he finished third in the King George VI Chase and fourth in the Gold Cup before producing arguably his best performance by running second under top weight in the Grand National. His later career was repeatedly interrupted by injury.

== Background ==
Mont Tremblant was a chestnut gelding with a white blaze and three white socks bred in France by François Dupré. He was sired by the Prix du Cadran winner Gris Perle, a representative of the Byerley Turk sire-line. Mont Tremblant's dam Paltoquette was a great granddaughter of Lady Cynosure (a full-sister to Polymelus) whose other descendants have included Provoke and Right Royal. The horse was named by Dupre after a mountain in Quebec.

== Racing career ==
Mont Tremblant began his racing career in France where he won on the flat and over hurdles before being bought by Dorothy Paget and imported to England. The gelding was sent into training with Fulke Walwyn at his Saxon House stable in Lambourn, Berkshire.

In the 1951/52 National Hunt season Mont Tremblant was matched against more experienced competition. Walwyn had problems getting the horse to peak fitness as the gallops at Lambourn were frozen, and was greatly aided when his rival trainer Bill Wightman allowed him to use his training facilities at Upham, Hampshire. In February he won a valuable handicap chase at Kempton Park Racecourse, conceding weight to his rivals. On 6 March, the six-year-old, ridden by David Dick, contested the 25th running of the Cheltenham Gold Cup on 6 March and started at odds of 8/1 in a thirteen-runner field. Silver Fame and Greenogue returned after fighting out the finish in 1951 but the 7/2 favourite was Freebooter the winner of the 1950 Grand National. The other runners included the improving six-year-old E.S.B. and the Vincent O'Brien-trained Knock Hard. Greenogue went to the front and maintained his advantage until the final turn by which point Knock Hard, Mont Tremblant, E.S.B. and Shaef were his closest pursuers. Freebooter had already fallen, whilst Fred Winter on Shaef was holding on to his horse's head after his bridle became dislodged on the first circuit. Knock Hard fell at the penultimate fence when looking the likely winner and E.S.B was still going well when falling at the last. Mont Tremblant was left with a clear advantage and drew away up the run-in to win by ten lengths from Shaef, with the 66/1 outsider Galloway Braes four lengths back in third.

Mon Tremblant continued to show top-class form in the early part of the following season when Dick Francis replaced the injured David Dick. He won at Kempton, took the Stanley Chase at Sandown Park and then finished second to Halloween in the King George VI Chase at Kempton in December. Francis said that "Mont Tremblant was a dream of a horse to ride, for he was a very deliberate jumper and had a long, graceful stride". On a cold, misty day in March he faced eleven opponents as he attempted to repeat his 1952 success in the Cheltenham Gold Cup. When the horses emerged from the fog approaching the third last he was disputing the lead with Galloway Braes and E.S.B. but was unable to make further progress and faded in the closing stages to finish fourth behind Knock Hard, Halloween and Galloway Braes. Later that month Mont Tremblant started at odds of 18/1 for the 1953 Grand National in which he carried top weight of 153 pounds and finished second, twenty lengths behind the Vincent O'Brien-trained Early Mist.

Mon Tremblant remained in training for several years and finished fourth in the 1953 Gold Cup but suffered recurrent injury problems and never won again at the highest level.

== Assessment and honours ==
In their book, A Century of Champions, based on the Timeform rating system, John Randall and Tony Morris rated Mont Tremblant an "average" Gold Cup winner. In 2002 Randall rated his performance in the 1953 Grand National as the sixth-best in the race since World War II.

== Pedigree ==
Pedigree of Mont Tremblant (FR), chestnut gelding, 1946
Sire Gris Perle (FR) 1929	Brabant (FR); 1915	Marsan	Elf
Sire Gris Perle (FR) 1929	Brabant (FR); 1915	Marsan	L'Orangerie
Sire Gris Perle (FR) 1929	Brabant (FR); 1915	Bruxelles	Le Sagittaire
Sire Gris Perle (FR) 1929	Brabant (FR); 1915	Bruxelles	Brienne
Sire Gris Perle (FR) 1929	Mauve (FR); 1920	Fauche le Vent	Mackintosh
Sire Gris Perle (FR) 1929	Mauve (FR); 1920	Fauche le Vent	Litorne
Sire Gris Perle (FR) 1929	Mauve (FR); 1920	Rose de Mai	Callistrate
Sire Gris Perle (FR) 1929	Mauve (FR); 1920	Rose de Mai	May Pole
Dam Paltoquette (FR) 1928	Tom Pinch (GB); 1921	Hurry On	Marcovil
Dam Paltoquette (FR) 1928	Tom Pinch (GB); 1921	Hurry On	Tout Suite
Dam Paltoquette (FR) 1928	Tom Pinch (GB); 1921	Bella Vista	Cyllene
Dam Paltoquette (FR) 1928	Tom Pinch (GB); 1921	Bella Vista	Emotion
Dam Paltoquette (FR) 1928	Pall Mall (FR); 1921	Gorgos	Ladas
Dam Paltoquette (FR) 1928	Pall Mall (FR); 1921	Gorgos	The Gorgon
Dam Paltoquette (FR) 1928	Pall Mall (FR); 1921	Plym	St Frusquin
Dam Paltoquette (FR) 1928	Pall Mall (FR); 1921	Plym	Lady Cynosure (Family: 3-f)
