= George Beeby (horse racing) =

British racehorse trainer

George Beeby (1904–1977) was a British racehorse trainer. He was born in Leicestershire on 6 May 1904, the son of a noted horse dealer, and after a short riding career as an amateur began to train there in 1924. In 1936 he bought Hamilton House at Compton in Berkshire and trained there until his retirement in 1972. For much of his career he concentrated on jumpers but in his later years trained exclusively on the Flat.

Beeby trained two winners of the Cheltenham Gold Cup, Brendan's Cottage in 1939 and Silver Fame in 1951. Beeby also trained the winner of the 1949 King George VI Chase, Finnure, and the winner of the 1957 Cotswold Chase, Ballyatom. Beeby trained a total of 19 winners at the Cheltenham Festival over the period 1930-59.

He retired to Hampstead Norreys and died in a Reading nursing home on 21 September 1977.
