= Dorothy Paget =

English racehorse owner (1905-1960)

The Honourable Dorothy Paget
- Born: 21 February 1905; England
- Died: 9 February 1960 (aged 54); England
- Education: Heathfield School
- Occupation: Racehorse owner
- Known for: Sainte-Geneviève-des-Bois Russian Cemetery
- Parents: Lord Queenborough (father); Pauline Payne Whitney (mother)
- Relatives: Olive Paget (sister)

Dorothy Wyndham Paget (21 February 1905 – 9 February 1960) was a British racehorse owner and sponsor of motor racing.

== Early life ==
Paget was the daughter of Lord Queenborough and Pauline Payne Whitney of the American Whitney family. She was a cousin of Jock Whitney, owner of the dual Cheltenham Gold Cup winner Easter Hero and latterly American Ambassador in London, and granddaughter of William C. Whitney, a wealthy American businessman, politician and racehorse owner. Paget was educated at Heathfield School, Ascot, Berkshire. She lived for the most part in Hermit's Wood, Nightingales Lane (she also owned Pollards Wood Grange), Chalfont St. Giles, Buckinghamshire, England.

== Horse racing and gambling ==
Dorothy Paget's mother was a member of the New York Whitney family, which was one of the most prominent thoroughbred horse racing and breeding families in America. Paget too owned a stable of thoroughbreds as well as the Ballymacoll Stud breeding farm in County Meath, Ireland. Her horses won a total of 1,532 races in both flat and hurdling. She was the British flat racing Champion Owner in 1943, the year her horse Straight Deal won The Derby. She was leading National Hunt owner in 1933–34, 1940–41 and 1951–52. She owned seven Cheltenham Gold Cup winners, Golden Miller five times, 1932–1936 inclusive, Roman Hackle in 1940 and Mont Tremblant in 1952. Her four Champion Hurdle winners were Insurance in 1932 and 1933, Solford in 1940 and Distel in 1946. Golden Miller also provided her with her solitary victory in the Grand National in 1934, still the only occasion any horse has won the two major prizes of British steeplechasing in the same season.

Although Paget spent today's equivalent of many millions of pounds on bloodstock, Golden Miller and Insurance were by far the best known of her horses. They were purchased from Mr Phillip Carr (the father of A. W. Carr, the Nottinghamshire and England cricket captain) for 12,000 guineas (£441,000 in today's currency) for both of them. Her Derby winner, Straight Deal, was home bred and sire of the Champion Hurdle winner of 1957, Merry Deal, and it was at her Ballymacoll Stud that Arkle was foaled. On her death in 1960, Ballymacoll Stud was acquired by the English industrialist, Sir Michael Sobell.

Her many trainers, seventeen or eighteen in all, included Basil Briscoe, Owen Anthony, Frenchie Nicholson, Fulke Walwyn, Walter Nightingall (under both codes), Henri Jelliss, Sir Gordon Richards and, for a brief period, Fred Darling. She was considered a notoriously difficult owner, often phoning her trainer in the middle of the night. She famously, and very publicly fell out with Basil Briscoe after Golden Miller's repeated failure to win a second Grand National, despite it being very clear that the horse disliked the Aintree course. She also threw a screaming fit at Fulke Walwyn after the trainer could "only" deliver five winners of a six race card.

In her early years Paget hunted enthusiastically.

At the outbreak of war in 1939 and for some five years previously the two biggest racecourse gamblers, as opposed to professional backers, were both women. The other was Mrs. J.V. Rank (the sister in law of J. Arthur Rank) who, like Paget, had a number of horses in training but nothing like so many. Neither would hesitate to have £10,000 (£320,000 in today's money) or more on their horses whenever they ran.

Dorothy Paget had twenty-one runners in the Grand National (including her post death runner in 1960). Her first was Solanum in 1931, who fell at Becher's Brook on the second circuit (fence 22). Her racing colours were blue, yellow hoop on body and sleeves, yellow cap with blue hoop. Post death, she would have one final runner, Cannobie Lee, who in 1960 refused at Becher's Brook on the second circuit. A different set of silks were used for the late Miss Dorothy Paget. Brown and pink stripes, white cap.

== Motor racing ==
In the late 1920s financed the team of supercharged Bentleys created by Sir Henry (Tim) Birkin, a member of the Nottingham lace family.

== Benefactress ==
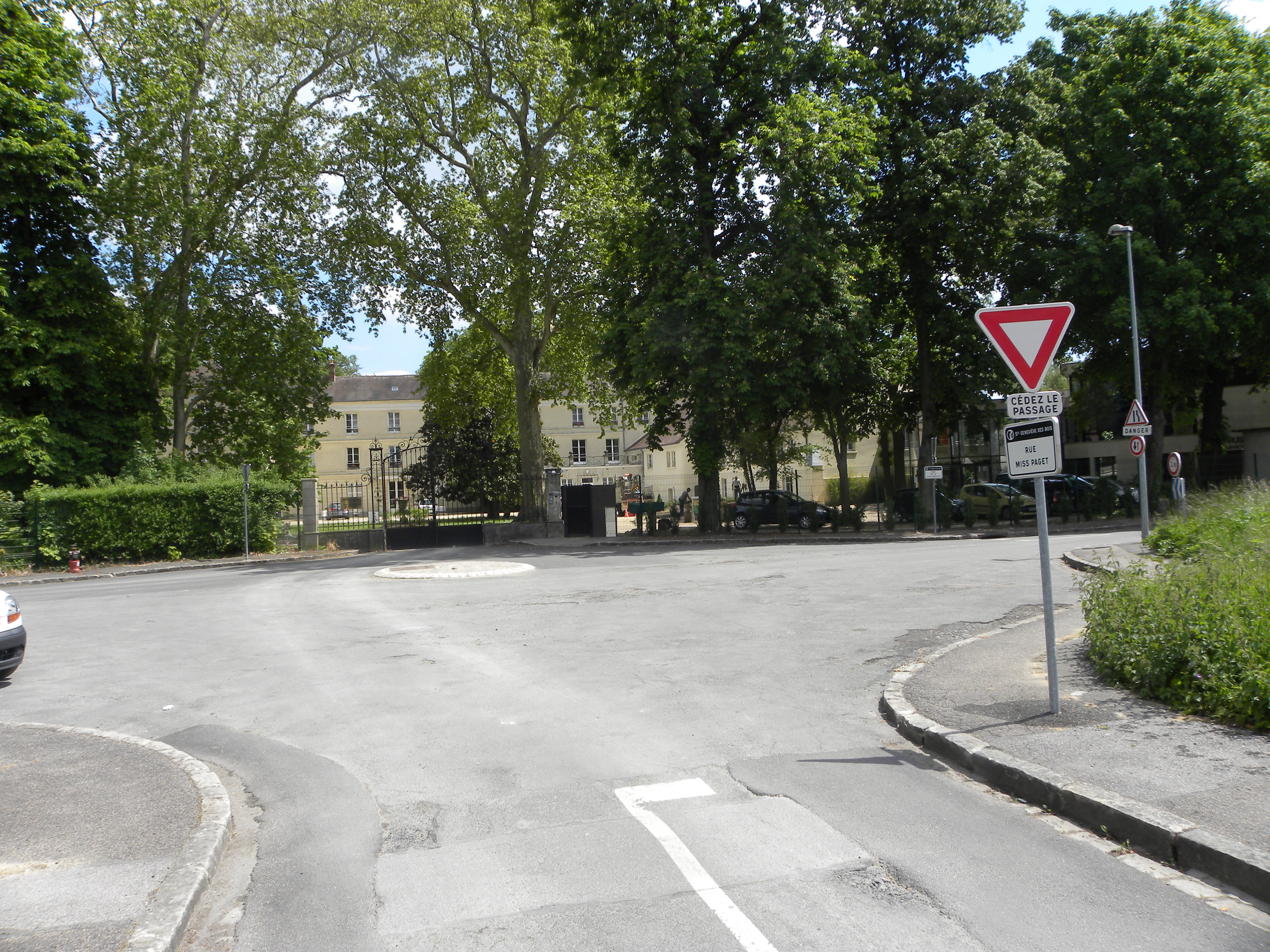
La Maison Russe from Rue Miss Paget in Sainte-Geneviève-des-Bois, Essonne

Paget is notably responsible for financing an old age home for Russian émigrés at Château de la Cossonnerie ("La Maison Russe") (originally an 18th-century farm, which had been enlarged at the beginning of the 19th century) as well as the Sainte-Geneviève-des-Bois Russian Cemetery in France. Dorothy Paget took profound interest in the fate of the Russian refugees after having attended a finishing school in Paris founded by Elena Orlov and sister Princess Vera Meshchersky (one of the Russian Red Cross trustees and daughter of Karl von Struve). Vera's niece, "Olili" (Olga Mumm, daughter of Vera's sister Olga) was Dorothy's beloved, long-time companion and with her, managed the breeding and training programs of Paget's racing stables. It was Dorothy Paget who purchased the plot for the cemetery, where such notable Russians as Ivan Bunin, Andrei Tarkovsky, and Rudolf Nureyev were later buried. She also saw to it that the residents of the old-age home "were supplied with turkey and plum pudding at Christmas time".

There is a street named after her: 'Rue Miss Paget' in Sainte-Geneviève-des-Bois, Essonne.

== Later life ==
Dorothy Paget lived an eccentric lifestyle at home, spending most of the day in bed and rising at night. Most bookmakers employed a member of staff to be on the phone at night to take bets solely from Miss Paget and also allowed her to place bets on races that had already taken place the previous day purely on her oath that she did not know the result. Her honesty in this regard was noted by the fact the majority of the horses she backed were already known by the bookmaker to have been beaten. In return however the bookmakers always honoured the occasions where she selected horses they knew to have won. She also assigned her staff different colours, with the exception of green, which she despised, and would use the colours in place of their names when speaking to them or of them.

Paget died of heart failure on 9 February 1960, aged fifty-four.
