= Gaelic Warrior =

Irish thoroughbred racehorse (born 2018)

- Racing silks of S Ricci
- Sire: Maxios
- Dam: Game Of Legs
- Damsire: Hernando
- Sex: Gelding
- Foaled: 5 April 2018
- Country: Germany
- Colour: Bay
- Breeder: The Niarchos Family
- Owner: Rich and Susannah Ricci
- Trainer: Willie Mullins

Major wins
- Channor Real Estate Group Novice Hurdle (2023); Faugheen Novice Chase (2023); Arkle Chase (2024); Oaksey Chase (2025); Aintree Bowl (2025); John Durkan Memorial Punchestown Chase (2025); Cheltenham Gold Cup (2026); Punchestown Gold Cup (2026)

Gaelic Warrior (born 5 April 2018) is a German-bred, Irish-trained thoroughbred racehorse. A steeplechaser, he is best known for winning the 2026 Cheltenham Gold Cup.

Gaelic Warrior is owned by Rich and Susannah Ricci. He is trained by Willie Mullins at Leighlinbridge in Co. Carlow.

In the 2026 Cheltenham Gold Cup, Gaelic Warrior, ridden by Paul Townend, went off as the 11-4 joint favourite with Jango Baie. He won by eight lengths from Jango Baie, with the 2025 winner Inothewayurthinkin closing strongly to take 3rd. The 2024 winner, Galopin Des Champs, had been ruled out through injury. It was Mullins' fifth Gold Cup win, and also a fifth win for jockey Paul Townend.

In the 2026 Punchestown Gold Cup, Gaelic Warrior, ridden by Paul Townend, went off at 5-6 favourite and won by twenty-six lengths from Fact To File.
