= 1953 Grand National =

English steeplechase horse race

- Grand National
- Location: Aintree Racecourse
- Date: 28 March 1953
- Winning horse: (Republic of Ireland) Early Mist
- Starting price: 20/1
- Jockey: (Republic of Ireland) Bryan Marshall
- Trainer: (Republic of Ireland) Vincent O'Brien
- Owner: (Republic of Ireland) Joe H. Griffin
- Conditions: Good

External videos
- Highlights of the 1953 Grand National (British Pathé)

The 1953 Grand National was the 107th renewal of the Grand National horse race that took place at Aintree Racecourse near Liverpool, England, on 28 March 1953.

The race was won by eight-year-old Early Mist at odds of 20/1. Early Mist was the first of trainer Vincent O'Brien's three consecutive Grand National victories, and his jockey, Bryan Marshall, would also go on to win a second successive National the following year on Royal Tan.

Of the 31 that started, 5 finished. Mont Tremblant was 2nd, Irish Lizard was 3rd, Overshadow finished 4th and Senlac Hill was last to complete in 5th.

== Finishing order ==
Position	Name	Jockey	Age	Handicap (st-lb)	SP	Distance
01	Early Mist	Bryan Marshall	8	11-2	20/1	20 Lengths
02	Mont Tremblant	David Dick	7	12-5	18/1	
03	Irish Lizard	Bob Turnell	10	10-6	33/1	
04	Overshadow	Pat Taaffe	13	10-4	33/1	
05	Senlac Hill	Dick Francis	8	10-10	66/1	Last to complete

== Non-finishers ==
Fence	Name	Jockey	Age	Handicap (st-lb)	SP	Fate
01	Grand Truce	Derek Leslie	9	10-0	66/1	Fell
01	Quite Naturally	Tim Molony	9	10-8	18/1	Fell
02	Happy Days	Alan Benson	13	10-0	66/1	Fell
03	Wait and See	Arthur Freeman	8	10-5	50/1	Fell
03	Head Crest	Sid Barnes	7	10-0	40/1	Fell
04	Baire	John Foster	7	10-0	40/1	Fell
04	Cardinal Error	Dick Curran	9	11-5	100/7	Fell
06	Land Fort	H Oliver	9	10-13	50/1	Fell
08	Hiebra	Alf Mullins	8	10-0	50/1	Fell
08	Parasol II	Alan Oughton	8	10-4	25/1	Fell
08	Whispering Steel	Bert Morrow	8	10-3	9/1	Brought Down
08	Lucky Dome	Patrick Doyle	7	10-0	10/1	Pulled Up
08	Desire	Tom Cullen	12	10-0	66/1	Pulled Up
10	Punchestown Star	Sam McComb	9	10-0	66/1	Refused
11	Glen Fire	Micky Lynn	10	10-8	10/1	Refused
11	Larry Finn	Arthur Thompson	9	10-11	40/1	Brought Down
11	Cream of the Border	Jumbo Wilkinson	8	10-0	66/1	Brought Down
11	Steel Lock	Mr E Maggs	9	10-0	66/1	Refused
19	Knuckleduster	Mr PB Browne	9	11-0	25/1	Pulled Up
20	Armoured Knight	Thomas Mabbutt	9	10-1	66/1	Fell
20	Ordnance	Michael Scudamore	7	10-3	25/1	Fell
22	Uncle Barney	Jack Boddy	10	10-4	40/1	Fell
22	Witty	George Slack	8	10-5	22/1	Unseated Rider
24	Pearly Prince	Taffy Jenkins	10	10-0	66/1	Fell
27	Little Yid	Jimmy Power	11	10-1	7/1	Refused
28	Cloncarrig	Bob McCreery	13	11-5	66/1	Fell
