= Rich Ricci =

American banker and racehorse owner (born 1964)

- Born: Richard Thomas Ricci; 1964 (age 61–62); Nebraska, United States
- Occupation: Racehorse owner
- Known for: Banker at Barclays
- Spouse: Susannah Ricci

Richard Thomas Ricci is an American-British banker and racehorse owner. He was previously Chief Executive of Barclays Bank's Corporate and Investment banking.

== Early life and career ==
Ricci was born in Nebraska, United States in 1964. He earned a bachelor's degree in finance from Creighton University. He started banking for the Bank of Boston and then the Bank of New England. He joined Barclays de Zoete Wedd (BZW) in the United Kingdom in 1994. In 2002, he became the Chief Operating Officer of Barclays Global Investors before becoming head of Barclays Investment Banking and Management. In 2008, he was part of the team that took over Lehmann Brothers' Investment arm for Barclays and oversaw their integration with Barclays. In 2011, he received a bonus of £44 million, with newspapers attributing his name to nominative determinism. Due to the Libor scandal, Ricci did not receive a bonus for 2012, however he did earn £17 million after selling Barclays shares after they were released to senior executives. Ricci resigned from Barclays in 2013. After leaving Barclays, he became head of the Liberum Investment Bank.

== Horse racing ==
The silks worn by horses owned by Rich Ricci

Despite being based in England for much of his career, Ricci and his wife Susannah have been involved in horse racing in Ireland since 2005, owning a large number of racehorses trained by champion trainer Willie Mullins. He later started entering them in British and Australian races. Following an article in The Independent that called him "the fat cat in the hat", Ricci retaliated by naming one of his horses Fatcatinthehat. At the 2016 Cheltenham Festival, 3 of his horses won earning him £248,000. He won the 2026 Cheltenham Gold Cup with Gaelic Warrior.

== Personal life ==
Ricci is married to Susannah, an accountant. The couple own the Yotes Court vineyard in Kent.
