= Cheltenham Gold Cup =

Steeplechase horse race in Britain

Coordinates: 51°55′13″N 2°3′28″W

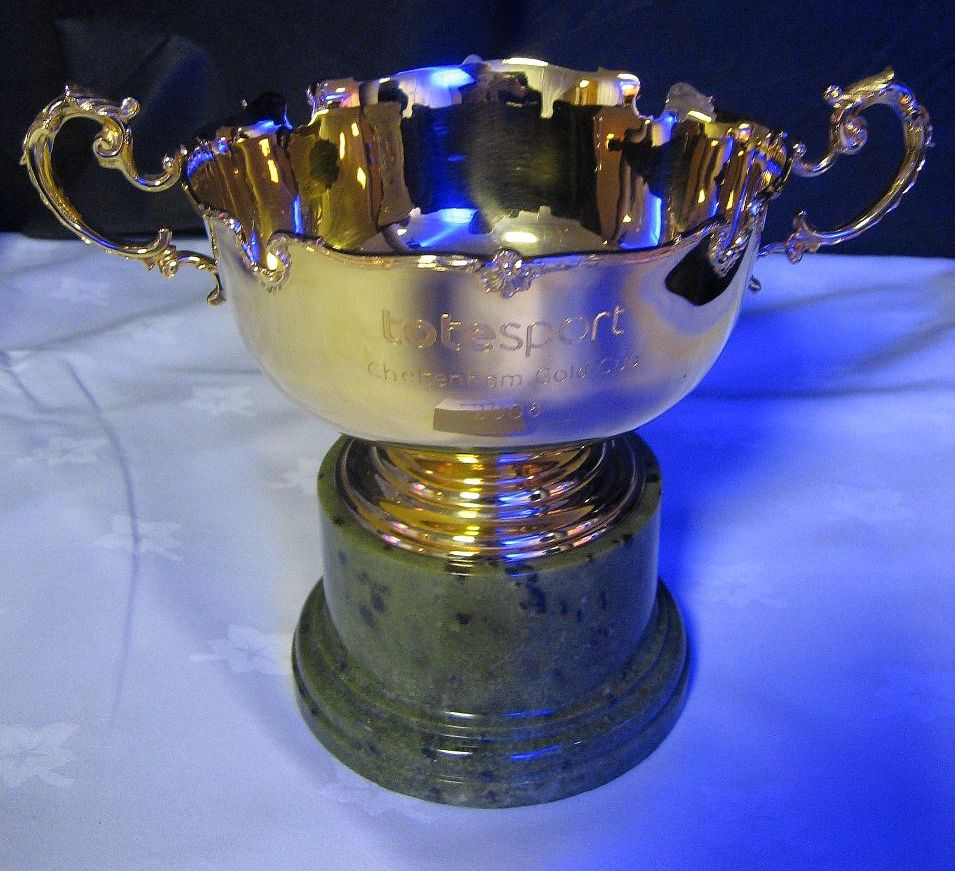
- Class: Grade 1
- Location: Cheltenham Racecourse; Cheltenham, England
- Inaugurated: 1924
- Race type: Steeplechase
- Sponsor: Boodles
- Website: Cheltenham Gold Cup

Race information
- Distance: 3m 2f 70y (5,294 m)
- Surface: Turf
- Track: Left-handed
- Qualification: 5-years-old and up
- Weight: 11 st 6 lb (5yo); 11 st 10 lb (6yo+); Allowances; 7 lb for mares
- Purse: £646,880 (2025); 1st: £363,999

Cheltenham Gold Cup Chase
2026
Gaelic Warrior	Jango Baie	Inothewayurthinkin

Previous years
2025
Inothewayurthinkin	Galopin Des Champs	Gentlemansgame
2024
Galopin Des Champs	Gerri Colombe	Corach Rambler
2023
Galopin Des Champs	Bravemansgame	Conflated
2022
A Plus Tard	Minella Indo	Protektorat
2021
Minella Indo	A Plus Tard	Al Boum Photo

2020-2011
2020
Al Boum Photo	Santini	Lostintranslation
2019
Al Boum Photo	Anibale Fly	Bristol De Mai
2018
Native River	Might Bite	Anibale Fly
2017
Sizing John	Minella Rocco	Native River
2016
Don Cossack	Djakadam	Don Poli
2015
Coneygree	Djakadam	Road To Riches
2014
Lord Windermere	On His Own	The Giant Bolster
2013
Bobs Worth	Sir Des Champs	Long Run
2012
Synchronised	The Giant Bolster	Long Run
2011
Long Run	Denman	Kauto Star

2010-2001
2010
Imperial Commander	Denman	Mon Mome
2009
Kauto Star	Denman	Exotic Dancer
2008
Denman	Kauto Star	Neptune Collonges
2007
Kauto Star	Exotic Dancer	Turpin Green
2006
War of Attrition	Hedgehunter	Forget The Past
2005
Kicking King	Take The Stand	Sir Rembrandt
2004
Best Mate	Sir Rembrandt	Harbour Pilot
2003
Best Mate	Truckers Tavern	Harbour Pilot
2002
Best Mate	Commanche Court	See More Business

2000-1991
2000
Looks Like Trouble	Florida Pearl	Strong Promise
1999
See More Business	Go Ballistic	Florida Pearl
1998
Cool Dawn	Strong Promise	Dorans Pride
1997
Mr Mulligan	Barton Bank	Dorans Pride
1996
Imperial Call	Rough Quest	Couldnt Be Better
1995
Master Oats	Dubacilla	Miinnehoma
1994
The Fellow	Jodami	Young Hustler
1993
Jodami	Rushing Wild	Royal Athlete
1992
Cool Ground	The Fellow	Docklands Express
1991
Garrison Savannah	The Fellow	Desert Orchid

1990-1981
1990
Norton's Coin	Toby Tobias	Desert Orchid
1989
Desert Orchid	Yahoo	Charter Party
1988
Charter Party	Cavvies Clown	Beau Ranger
1987
The Thinker	Cybrandian	Door Latch
1986
Dawn Run	Wayward Lad	Forgive 'n Forget
1985
Forgive 'n Forget	Righthand Man	Earls Brig
1984
Burrough Hill Lad	Brown Chamberlin	Drumlargan
1983
Bregawn	Captain John	Wayward Lad
1982
Silver Buck	Bregawn	Sunset Cristo
1981
Little Owl	Night Nurse	Silver Buck

1980-1971
1980
Master Smudge	Mac Vidi	Approaching
1979
Alverton	Royal Mail	Aldaniti
1978
Midnight Court	Brown Lad	Master H
1977
Davy Lad	Tied Cottage	Summerville
1976
Royal Frolic	Brown Lad	Colebridge
1975
Ten Up	Soothsayer	Bula
1974
Captain Christy	The Dikler	Game Spirit
1973
The Dikler	Pendil	Charlie Potheen
1972
Glencaraig Lady	Royal Toss	The Dikler
1971
L'Escargot	Leap Frog	The Dikler

1970-1964
1970
L'Escargot	French Tan	Spanish Steps
1969
What a Myth	Domacorn	Playlord
1968
Fort Leney	The Laird	Stalbridge Colonist
1967
Woodland Venture	Stalbridge Colonist	What a Myth
1966
Arkle	Dormant	Snaigow
1965
Arkle	Mill House	Stoney Crossing
1964
Arkle	Mill House	Pas Seul

The Cheltenham Gold Cup is a Grade 1 National Hunt horse race run on the New Course at Cheltenham Racecourse in England, over a distance of about 3 miles 2½ furlongs (3 miles 2 furlongs and 70 yards, or 5,294 m), and during its running there are 22 fences to be jumped. The race takes place each year during the Cheltenham Festival in March.

The steeplechase, which is open to horses aged five years and over, is the most prestigious of all National Hunt events and it is sometimes referred to as the Blue Riband of jump-racing. Its roll of honour features the names of such chasers as Arkle, Best Mate, Golden Miller, Kauto Star, Denman and Mill House. The Gold Cup is the most valuable non-handicap chase in Britain, and in 2025 it offered a total prize fund of £625,000.

== History ==
=== Early years ===
The first horse race known as the Cheltenham Gold Cup took place in July 1819. It was a flat race, and it was contested over 3 miles on Cleeve Hill, which overlooks the present venue. The inaugural winner, Spectre, won a prize of 100 guineas for his owner Mr Bodenham.

The founding of the Cheltenham Gold Cup was an important event in the history of National Hunt racing. In the early 1920s there were very few valuable weight-for-age steeplechases. Apart from the National Hunt Chase at Cheltenham and the Champion Chase at Liverpool all the most important races were handicaps. Some people thought this was not in the best interests of the sport, so the Gold Cup was founded to redress the balance to a certain degree. It is not sure who had the idea for the Gold Cup, but it may have been Mr F.H. Cathcart, the Chairman of the Cheltenham Executive. It took a while for the prestige of the Gold Cup to grow, but it is now regarded as the true championship race for staying chasers.

The Cheltenham Gold Cup was first run as a steeplechase on 12 March 1924, over 3 miles 3 furlongs, for five year olds and upwards, with five year olds carrying 11 st 4 lbs, and the remainder 12 st. The race was covered by Pathe News. A prize of £685 was awarded to the owner of the winning horse. This was considerably less valuable than the National Hunt Chase, which was still regarded as the most important race of the meeting. The weather at Cheltenham for that first Gold Cup was mild and springlike. Among the spectators was the Prince of Wales, a friend of Harry Brown who was riding Conjuror II. There was an exciting finish, with Major E.H. Wyndham's five year old, Red Splash, 5/1, ridden by Dick Rees and trained by Fred Withington, beating Conjuror II by a head, with Gerald L a neck away third. Forewarned, ridden by Jack Anthony, was the 3/1 favourite. Red Splash appeared to have a great future, but he was difficult to train and never again ran in the Gold Cup.

The event originally took place on what is now the "Old Course" at Cheltenham. In its early years it was overshadowed at the Festival by another race, the National Hunt Chase and was worth less in prize money than the County Handicap Hurdle which had a purse of £1,000.

The Gold Cup was abandoned in 1931 (because of frost) and 1937 (flooding), but the five intervening years saw the emergence of the most successful horse in the event's history. All five races from 1932 to 1936 were won by Golden Miller, who also won the Grand National in 1934.

During World War II, the Gold Cup was cancelled twice, in 1943 and 1944. The first multiple winner in the post-war era was Cottage Rake, who won the three runnings from 1948 to 1950. Cottage Rake was trained in Ireland by Vincent O'Brien, and his successes helped to popularise the Gold Cup, and the Festival itself, with the Irish public.

=== Modern era ===
The Gold Cup was switched to the "New Course" in 1959, and this remains the regular track used for the event. In the mid-1960s, the race was dominated by Arkle, who won three consecutive runnings from 1964 to 1966. Such was Arkle's perceived superiority before the last of these victories that he was given a starting price of 1/10 (a £10 bet would have won £1). He remains the shortest-priced winner in the race's history.

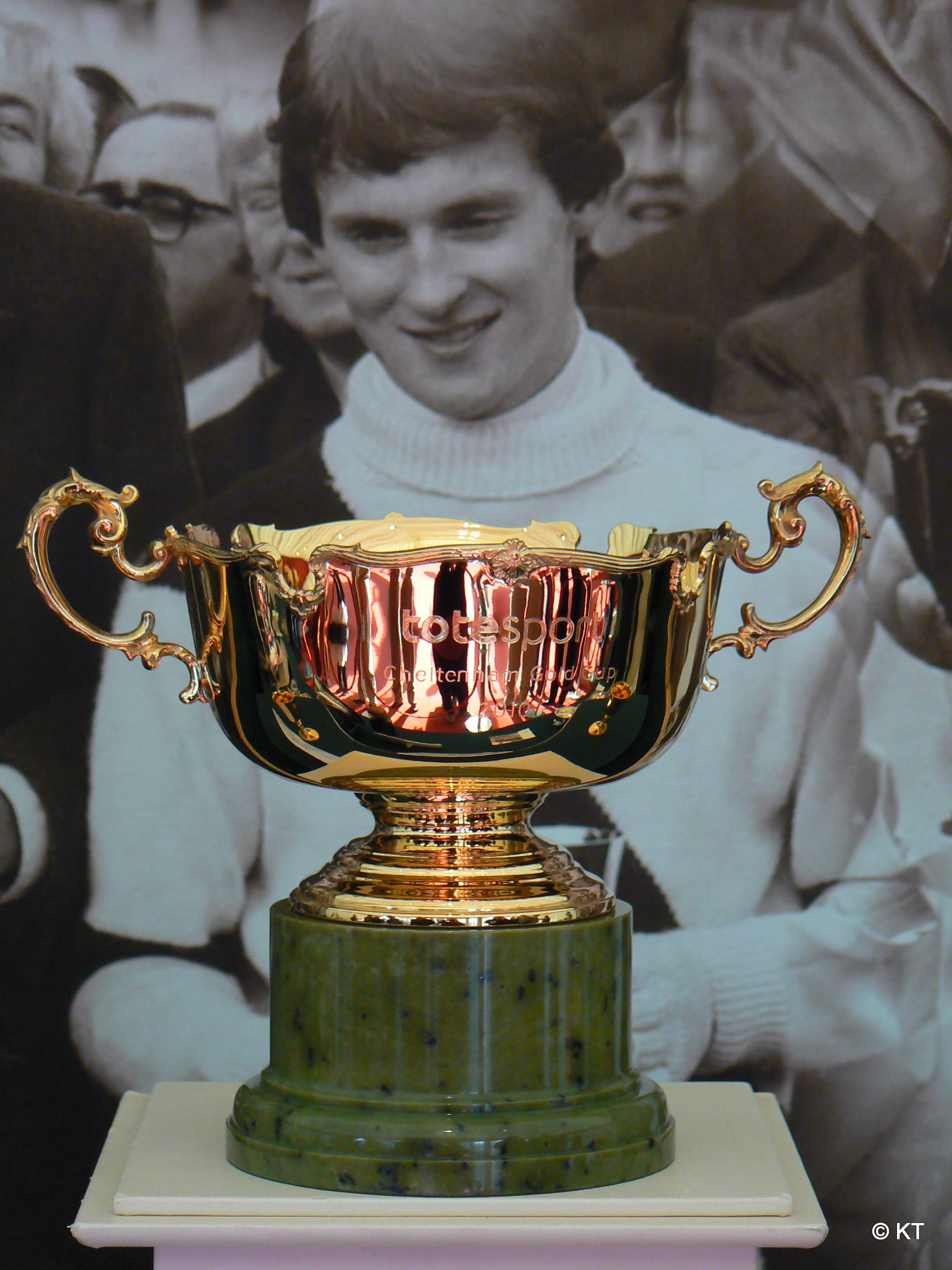
Cheltenham Gold Cup with Graham Bradley

The first commercial sponsorship of the race was by Piper Champagne, which began supporting the event in 1972. The Tote (now known as Totesport) became the sponsor in 1980.

The most remarkable feat in the Gold Cup by a trainer came in 1983, when Michael Dickinson was responsible for all of the first five horses to finish – Bregawn, Captain John, Wayward Lad, Silver Buck and Ashley House. The 1986 winner, Dawn Run, is the only horse to have ever won both this race and the leading hurdle event, the Champion Hurdle. One of the most popular horses to win the Gold Cup was Desert Orchid, a grey who won the event in 1989. The following year's running was won by Norton's Coin, whose starting price of 100/1 represents the race's longest ever winning price.

The entire Cheltenham Festival was cancelled in 2001 because of an outbreak of foot-and-mouth disease. A replacement for the Cheltenham Gold Cup, the Gold Trophy Chase, was contested at Sandown in late April, but the Racing Post stated that this "lacked any strength in depth and was no substitute for the Gold Cup". The next three runnings were all won by Best Mate, who is the most recent of the four horses to have won the race three or more times.

In 2009, Kauto Star became the first horse to regain the Gold Cup. He overcame his stablemate and conqueror in 2008, Denman, who had recovered from a heart condition to take his place in the race. Timeform spokesperson Kieran Packman said of Kauto Star's performance, "it is the best Gold Cup-winning figure since the Arkle era in the mid-1960s".

One of the cups, a different one being awarded each year, was reported stolen on 14 July 2010 after a burglary at a home in Wormington, Gloucestershire.

Cheltenham Racecourse announced in September 2018 that it had been reunited with the original Cheltenham Gold Cup trophy, dating back to 1924, and will present it to the winner of the 2019 race. First awarded to five-year-old Red Splash, owned by Major Humphrey Wyndham, trained by Fred Withington and ridden by Dick Rees, it will now be re-introduced as a perpetual trophy, presented to the winning connections of the 2019 race and in future years.

In 2020 the Cheltenham Festival, and the Gold Cup in particular, was blamed for accelerating the spread of COVID-19 in the UK, being one of the last major sporting events to take place before national lockdowns were imposed by the government. In 2021 the Gold Cup was contested behind closed doors, as the rest of the festival was, resulting in a muted atmosphere. In 2022 Rachael Blackmore became the first female jockey to ride to victory at the Gold Cup on A Plus Tard, who she had ridden to second place the previous year.

== Records ==
Most successful horse (5 wins):

- Golden Miller – 1932, 1933, 1934, 1935, 1936

Other multiple winners:

- Easter Hero – 1929, 1930
- Cottage Rake – 1948, 1949, 1950
- Arkle – 1964, 1965, 1966
- L'Escargot – 1970, 1971
- Best Mate – 2002, 2003, 2004
- Al Boum Photo – 2019, 2020
- Galopin Des Champs – 2023, 2024

Leading jockey (5 wins):

- Paul Townend - Al Boum Photo (2019, 2020), Galopin Des Champs (2023, 2024), Gaelic Warrior (2026)

Leading trainer (5 wins):

- Tom Dreaper – Prince Regent (1946), Arkle (1964, 1965, 1966), Fort Leney (1968)
- Willie Mullins - Al Boum Photo (2019, 2020), Galopin Des Champs (2023, 2024), Gaelic Warrior (2026)

Leading owner (7 wins):

- Dorothy Paget – Golden Miller (1932, 1933, 1934, 1935, 1936), Roman Hackle (1940), Mont Tremblant (1952)

Multiple wins on 2 or more horses

Trainer: Willie Mullins, Jockey: Paul Townend 2019, 2020 Al Boum Photo, 2023, 2024 Galopin Des Champs.

== Winners ==
- Amateur jockeys indicated by "Mr".
- Winning mares indicated by †
- Winning trainers based in Great Britain unless indicated (IRE) = Ireland, (FRA) = France

Date	Winner	SP	Age	Jockey	Trainer	Owner	Field	2nd and 3rd	Time	Ref.
12 March 1924	Red Splash	5/1	5	Dick Rees	Fred Withington	Maj. Humphrey Wyndham	9	2nd. (hd) Conjuror II 7/1; 3rd. (nk) Gerald L. 5/1	Not taken	
11 March 1925	Ballinode†	3/1	9	Ted Leader	Frank Morgan (IRE)	Christopher Bentley	4	2nd. (5 L) Alcazar 8/13F; 3rd. (dst) Patsey 10/1	7:29.6	
9 March 1926	Koko	10/1	8	Tim Hamey	Alfred Bickley	Frank Barbour	8	2nd. (4 L) Old Tay Bridge 3/1; 3rd. (5 L) Ruddyglow 6/5F	7:11.0	
8 March 1927	Thrown In	10/1	11	Mr Hugh Grosvenor	Owen Anthony	2nd Lord Stalbridge	8	2nd. (2 L) Grakle 5/1; 3rd. (1 1/2) Silvo 13/8F	7:28.0	
13 March 1928	Patron Saint	7/2	5	Dick Rees	Stanley Harrison	F. W. Keen	7	2nd. (4 L) Vive 8/1; 3rd. (2 L) Koko 4/5F	7:29.6	
12 March 1929	Easter Hero	7/4F	9	Dick Rees	Jack Anthony	John Hay Whitney	10	2nd. (20 L) Lloydie 100/9; 3rd. (2 L) Grakle 11/4	6:57.0	
11 March 1930	Easter Hero	8/11F	10	Tommy Cullinan	Jack Anthony	John Hay Whitney	4	2nd. (20 L) Grakle 10/1; 3rd. (dist) Gib 13/8	7:06.0	
No race 1931 ^{[1]}
1 March 1932	Golden Miller	13/2	5	Ted Leader	Basil Briscoe	Dorothy Paget	6	2nd. (4 L) Inverse 8/1; 3rd. (dist) Aruntius 20/1	7:33.4	
7 March 1933	Golden Miller	4/7F	6	Billy Stott	Basil Briscoe	Dorothy Paget	7	2nd. (10 L) Thomond II 11/4; 3rd. (5 L) Delaneige 20/1	7:33.0	
6 March 1934	Golden Miller	6/5F	7	Gerry Wilson	Basil Briscoe	Dorothy Paget	7	2nd. (6 L) Avenger 6/1; 3rd. (6 L) Kellsboro 10/1	7:04.6	
14 March 1935	Golden Miller	1/2F	8	Gerry Wilson	Basil Briscoe	Dorothy Paget	5	2nd. (3/4 L) Thomond II 5/2; 3rd. (5 L) Kellsboro' Jack 100/7	6:30.0	
12 March 1936	Golden Miller	21/20F	9	Evan Williams	Owen Anthony	Dorothy Paget	6	2nd. (12 L) Royal Mail 5/1; 3rd. (2 L) Kellsboro' Jack 10/1	7:05.2	
No race 1937 ^{[1]}
10 March 1938	Morse Code	13/2	9	Danny Morgan	Ivor Anthony	Dealtry C. Part	6	2nd. (2 L) Golden Miller 7/4F; 3rd. (3 L) Macaulay 3/1	6:35.2	
9 March 1939	Brendan's Cottage	8/1	9	George Owen	George Beeby	Jean Smith-Bingham	5	2nd. (5 L) Morse Code 4/7F; 3rd. (dist) Embarrassed 25/1	7:34.2	
20 March 1940	Roman Hackle	EvensF	7	Evan Williams	Owen Anthony	Dorothy Paget	7	2nd. (10 L) Black Hawk 20/1; 3rd. (2 L) Royal Mail 100/8	6:46.4	
20 March 1941	Poet Prince	7/2	9	Roger Burford	Ivor Anthony	David Sherbrooke	10	2nd. (3 L) Savon 100/30; 3rd. (sh) Red Rower 8/1	6:15.6	
21 March 1942	Medoc II	9/2	8	Frenchie Nicholson	Reg Hobbs	7th Earl of Sefton	12	2nd. (3 L) Red Rower 3/1F; 3rd. (sh) Asterabad 20/1	6:38.0	
Races not held in 1943–44 due to World War II ^{[2]}
17 March 1945	Red Rower	11/4F	11	Davy Jones	2nd Lord Stalbridge	2nd Lord Stalbridge	16	2nd. (3 L) Schubert 11/2; 3rd. (1 1/2 L) Paladin 100/30	6:16.2	
14 March 1946	Prince Regent	4/7F	11	Tim Hyde	Tom Dreaper (IRE)	Jimmy Rank	6	2nd. (5 L) Poor Flame 5/1; 3rd. (4 L) Red 9/2 April	6:47.6	
12 April 1947	Fortina	8/1	6	Mr Richard Black	Hector Christie	3rd Baron Grimthorpe	12	2nd. (10 L) Happy Home 3/1; 3rd. (5 L) Prince Blackthorn 8/1	6:41.2	
4 March 1948	Cottage Rake	10/1	9	Aubrey Brabazon	Vincent O'Brien (IRE)	Frank Vickerman	12	2nd. (1 1/2 L) Happy Home 6/1; 3rd. (10 L) Coloured School Boy 10/1	6:56.4	
11 April 1949	Cottage Rake	4/6F	10	Aubrey Brabazon	Vincent O'Brien (IRE)	Frank Vickerman	6	2nd. (2 L) Cool Customer 13/2; 3rd. (6 L) Coloured School Boy 8/1	6:36.0	
9 March 1950	Cottage Rake	5/6F	11	Aubrey Brabazon	Vincent O'Brien (IRE)	Frank L. Vickerman	6	2nd. (10 L) Finnure 5/4; 3rd. (8 L) Garde Toi 100/1	7:00.6	
25 April 1951	Silver Fame	6/4F	12	Martin Molony	George Beeby	1st Baron Bicester	6	2nd. (shd) Greenogue 100/8; 3rd. (2 L) Mighty Fine 10/1	6:23.4	
6 March 1952	Mont Tremblant	8/1	6	Dave Dick	Fulke Walwyn	Dorothy Paget	13	2nd. (10 L) Shaef 7/1; 3rd. (4 L) Galloway Braes 66/1	7:02.3	
5 March 1953	Knock Hard	11/2	9	Tim Molony	Vincent O'Brien (IRE)	Moya Keogh	12	2nd. (5 L) Halloween 5/2F; 3rd. (2 L) Galloway Braes 33/1	6:28.4	
1954	Four Ten	100/6	8	Tommy Cusack	John Roberts	Alan Strange	9	2nd. (4 L) Mariner's Log 20/1; 3rd. (4 L) Halloween 100/6	7:12.20	
1955	Gay Donald	33/1	9	Tony Grantham	Jim Ford	Philip Burt	9	2nd. (10 L) Halloween 7/2; 3rd. (8 L) Four Ten 3/1F	6:59.20	
1956	Limber Hill	11/8F	9	Jimmy Power	Bill Dutton	James Davey	11	2nd. (4 L) Vigor 50/1; 3rd. (1 1/2 L) Halloween 100/8	6:42.00	
1957	Linwell	100/9	9	Michael Scudamore	Charlie Mallon^{[3]}	David Brown	13	2nd. (1 L) Kerstin† 6/1; 3rd. (5 L) Rose Park 100/8	6:55.6	
1958	Kerstin†	7/1	8	Stan Hayhurst	Verly Bewicke	George H. Moore	9	2nd. (1/2 L) Polar Flight 11/2; 3rd. (dist) Gay Donald 13/2	6:55.6	
1959	Roddy Owen	5/1	10	Bobby Beasley	Danny Morgan (IRE)	12th Earl of Fingall	11	2nd. (3 L) Linwell 11/2; 3rd. (10 L) Lochroe 100/9	7:28.4	
1960	Pas Seul	6/1	7	Bill Rees	Bob Turnell	John Rogerson	11	2nd. (1 L) Lochroe 12/1; 3rd. (5 L) Zonda 9/1	7:00.0	
1961	Saffron Tartan	2/1	10	Fred Winter	Don Butchers	Guy Westmacott	9	2nd. (1 1/2 L) Pas Seul 100/30; 3rd. (3 L) Mandarin 100/7	6:49.8	
1962	Mandarin	7/2	11	Fred Winter	Fulke Walwyn	Peggy Hennessy	10	2nd. (1 L) Fortria 3/1; 3rd. (10 L) Cocky Consort 50/1	6:39.4	
1963	Mill House	7/2	6	Willie Robinson	Fulke Walwyn	Bill Gollings	12	2nd. (12 L) Fortria 4/1; 3rd. (4 L) Duke of York 7/1	7:08.4	
1964	Arkle	7/4	7	Pat Taaffe	Tom Dreaper (IRE)	Duchess of Westminster	4	2nd. (5 L) Mill House 8/13F; 3rd. (25 L) Pas Seul 50/1	6:45.6	
1965	Arkle	30/100F	8	Pat Taaffe	Tom Dreaper (IRE)	Duchess of Westminster	4	2nd. (20 L) Mill House 100/30; 3rd. (30 L) Stoney Crossing 100/1	6:41.2	
1966	Arkle	1/10F	9	Pat Taaffe	Tom Dreaper (IRE)	Duchess of Westminster	5	2nd. (30 L) Dormant 20/1; 3rd. (10 L) Snaigow 100/7	6:54.2	
1967	Woodland Venture	100/8	7	Terry Biddlecombe	Fred Rimell	Harry Collins	8	2nd. (3/4 L) Stalbridge Colonist 11/2; 3rd. (2 L) What A Myth 3/1	6:59.2	
1968	Fort Leney	11/2	10	Pat Taaffe	Tom Dreaper (IRE)	John Thomson	5	2nd. (neck) The Laird 3/1; 3rd. (1 L) Stalbridge Colonist 7/2	6:51.0	
1969	What A Myth	8/1	12	Paul Kelleway	Ryan Price	Lady Lucy Weir	11	2nd. (1 1/2 L) Domacorn 7/2; 3rd. (20 L) Playlord 4/1	7:30.8	
1970	L'Escargot	33/1	7	Tommy Carberry	Dan Moore (IRE)	Raymond R. Guest	12	2nd. (1 1/2 L) French Tan 8/1; 3rd. (10 L) Spanish Steps 9/4	6:47.4	
1971	L'Escargot	7/2	8	Tommy Carberry	Dan Moore (IRE)	Raymond R. Guest	8	2nd. (10 L) Leap Frog 7/2; 3rd. (15 L) The Dikler 15/2	8:00.6	
1972	Glencaraig Lady†	6/1	8	Frank Berry	Francis Flood (IRE)	Patrick Doyle	12	2nd. (3/4 L) Royal Toss 22/1; 3rd. (head) The Dikler 11/1	7:17.8	
1973	The Dikler	9/1	10	Ron Barry	Fulke Walwyn	Peggy August	12	2nd. (shd) Pendil 4/6F; 3rd. (6 L) Charlie Potheen 9/2	6:37.2	
1974	Captain Christy	7/1	7	Bobby Beasley	Pat Taaffe (IRE)	Jane Samuel	7	2nd. (5 L) The Dikler 5/1; 3rd. (20 L) Game Spirit 20/1	7:05.5	
1975	Ten Up	2/1	8	Tommy Carberry	Jim Dreaper (IRE)	Duchess of Westminster	8	2nd. (6 L) Soothsayer 28/1; 3rd. (1 1/2 L) Bula 5/1	7:51.4	
1976	Royal Frolic	14/1	7	John Burke	Fred Rimell	Sir Edward Hanmer	11	2nd. (5 L) Brown Lad 13/8F; 3rd. (5 L) Colebridge 12/1	6:40.1	
1977	Davy Lad	14/1	7	Dessie Hughes	Mick O'Toole (IRE)	Anne-Marie McGowan	13	2nd. (6 L) Tied Cottage 20/1; 3rd. (20 L) Summerville 15/1	7:13.8	
1978	Midnight Court	5/2	7	John Francome	Fred Winter	Olive Jackson	10	2nd. (7 L) Brown Lad 8/1; 3rd. (1 L) Master H 18/1	6:57.3	
1979	Alverton	5/1	9	Jonjo O'Neill	Peter Easterby	Snailwell Stud Co.	14	2nd. (25 L) Royal Mail 7/1; 3rd. (20 L) Aldaniti 40/1	7:01.0	
1980	Master Smudge ^{[4]}	14/1	8	Richard Hoare	Arthur Barrow	Arthur Barrow	14	2nd. (5 L) Mac Vidi 66/1; 3rd. (2 1/2 L) Approaching 11/1	7:14.2	
1981	Little Owl	6/1	7	Mr Jim Wilson	Peter Easterby	Robin & Jim Wilson	15	2nd. (1 1/2 L) Night Nurse 6/1; 3rd. (10 L) Silver Buck 7/2	7:09.9	
1982	Silver Buck	8/1	10	Robert Earnshaw	Michael Dickinson	Christine Feather	22	2nd. (2 L) Bregawn 18/1; 3rd. (12 L) Sunset Cristo 50/1	7:11.3	
1983	Bregawn	100/30	9	Graham Bradley	Michael W. Dickinson	James Kennelly	11	2nd. (5 L) Captain John 11/1; 3rd. (1 1/2 L) Wayward Lad 6/1	6:57.6	
1984	Burrough Hill Lad	7/2	8	Phil Tuck	Jenny Pitman	Stan Riley	12	2nd. (3 L) Brown Chamberlin 5/1; 3rd. (8 L) Drumlargan 16/1	6:41.4	
1985	Forgive 'n Forget	7/1	8	Mark Dwyer	Jimmy FitzGerald	Tim Kilroe & Sons Ltd	15	2nd. (1 1/2 L) Righthand Man 15/2; 3rd. (2 1/2 L) Earls Brig 13/2	6:48.3	
1986	Dawn Run†	15/8f	8	Jonjo O'Neill	Paddy Mullins (IRE)	Charmian Hill	11	2nd. (1 L) Wayward Lad 8/1; 3rd. (2 1/2 L) Forgive 'n Forget 7/2	6:35.0	
1987	The Thinker	13/2	9	Ridley Lamb	Arthur Stephenson	Tom McDonagh	12	2nd. (1 1/2 L) Cybrandian 25/1; 3rd. (2 1/2 L) Door Latch 9/1	6:56.1	
1988	Charter Party	10/1	10	Richard Dunwoody	David Nicholson	Smith / Mould	15	2nd. (6 L) Cavvies Clown 6/1; 3rd. (10 L) Beau Ranger 33/1	6:58.9	
1989	Desert Orchid	5/2	10	Simon Sherwood	David Elsworth	Richard Burridge	13	2nd. (1 1/2 L) Yahoo 25/1; 3rd. (8 L) Charter Party 14/1	7:17.6	
1990	Norton's Coin	100/1	9	Graham McCourt	Sirrel Griffiths	Sirrel Griffiths	12	2nd. (3/4 L) Toby Tobias 8/1; 3rd. (4 L) Desert Orchid 10/11f	6:30.9	
1991	Garrison Savannah	16/1	8	Mark Pitman	Jenny Pitman	Autofour Engineering	14	2nd. (shd) The Fellow 28/1; 3rd. (15 L) Desert Orchid 4/1	6:49.8	
1992	Cool Ground	25/1	10	Adrian Maguire	Toby Balding	Whitcombe Manor Racing	8	2nd. (shd) The Fellow 7/2; 3rd. (1 L) Docklands Express 16/1	6:47.5	
1993	Jodami	8/1	8	Mark Dwyer	Peter Beaumont	John Yeadon	16	2nd. (2 L) Rushing Wild 11/1; 3rd. (7 L) Royal Athlete 66/1	6:34.4	
1994	The Fellow	7/1	9	Adam Kondrat	François Doumen (FRA)	Marquesa de Moratalla	15	2nd. (1 1/2 L) Jodami 6/4F; 3rd. (4 L) Young Hustler 20/1	6:40.7	
1995	Master Oats	100/30	9	Norman Williamson	Kim Bailey	Paul Matthews	15	2nd. (15 L) Dubacilla 20/1; 3rd. (15 L) Miinnehoma 9/1	6:55.9	
1996	Imperial Call	9/2	7	Conor O'Dwyer	Fergie Sutherland (IRE)	Lisselan Farms Ltd	10	2nd. (4 L) Rough Quest 12/1; 3rd. (19 L) Couldn't Be Better 11/1	6:42.3	
1997	Mr Mulligan	20/1	9	Tony McCoy	Noel Chance	M. & G. Worcester	14	2nd. (9 L) Barton Bank 33/1; 3rd. (1/2 L) Dorans Pride 10/1	6:35.5	
1998	Cool Dawn	25/1	10	Andrew Thornton	Robert Alner	Dido Harding	17	2nd. (1 3/4 L) Strong Promise 14/1; 3rd. (hd) Dorans Pride 9/4	6:39.7	
1999	See More Business	16/1	9	Mick Fitzgerald	Paul Nicholls	Paul Barber / Keighley	12	2nd. (1 L) Go Ballistic 66/1; 3rd. (17 L) Florida Pearl 5/2F	6:41.9	
2000	Looks Like Trouble	9/2	8	Richard Johnson	Noel Chance	Tim Collins	12	2nd. (5 L) Florida Pearl 9/2; 3rd. (nck) Strong Promise 20/1	6:30.3	
No race 2001 ^{[5]}
2002	Best Mate	7/1	7	Jim Culloty	Henrietta Knight	Jim Lewis	18	2nd. (1 3/4 L) Commanche Court 25/1; 3rd. (8 L) See More Business 40/1	6:50.10	
2003	Best Mate	13/8F	8	Jim Culloty	Henrietta Knight	Jim Lewis	15	2nd. (10 L) Truckers Tavern 33/1; 3rd. (2 1/2 L) Harbour Pilot 40/1	6:39.10	
2004	Best Mate	8/11F	9	Jim Culloty	Henrietta Knight	Jim Lewis	10	2nd. (1/2 L) Sir Rembrandt 33/1; 3rd. (1 1/4 L) Harbour Pilot 20/1	6:42.60	
2005	Kicking King	4/1F	7	Barry Geraghty	Tom Taaffe (IRE)	Conor Clarkson	15	2nd. (5 L) Take The Stand 25/1; 3rd. (8 L) Sir Rembrandt 12/1	6:42.90	
2006	War of Attrition	15/2	7	Conor O'Dwyer	Mouse Morris (IRE)	Gigginstown House Stud	22	2nd. (2 1/2 L) Hedgehunter 16/1; 3rd. (7 L) Forget The Past 9/1	6:31.70	
2007	Kauto Star	5/4F	7	Ruby Walsh	Paul Nicholls	Clive D. Smith	15	2nd. (2 1/2 L) Exotic Dancer 9/2; 3rd. (2 1/2 L) Turpin Green 40/1	6:40.46	
2008	Denman	9/4	8	Sam Thomas	Paul Nicholls	Paul Barber / Findlay	12	2nd. (7 L) Kauto Star 10/11f 3rd. (shd) Neptune Collonges 25/1	6:47.84	
2009	Kauto Star	7/4F	9	Ruby Walsh	Paul Nicholls	Clive D. Smith	16	2nd. (13 L) Denman 7/1; 3rd. (2 1/2 L) Exotic Dancer 8/1	6:44.95	
2010	Imperial Commander	7/1	9	Paddy Brennan	Nigel Twiston-Davies	Our Friends in the North	11	2nd. (7 L) Denman 4/1; 3rd. (23 L) Mon Mome 50/1	6:43.90	
2011	Long Run	7/2F	6	Mr Sam Waley-Cohen	Nicky Henderson	Robert Waley-Cohen	13	2nd. (7 L) Denman 8/1; 3rd. (4 L) Kauto Star 5/1	6:29.70	
2012	Synchronised	8/1	9	Tony McCoy	Jonjo O'Neill	J. P. McManus	14	2nd. (2 1/4 L) The Giant Bolster 50/1; 3rd. (3/4 L) Long Run 7/4f	6:36.19	
2013	Bobs Worth	11/4F	8	Barry Geraghty	Nicky Henderson	The Not Afraid Partnership	9	2nd. (7 L) Sir Des Champs 4/1; 3rd. (2 3/4 L) Long Run 7/2	7:05.06	
2014	Lord Windermere	20/1	8	Davy Russell	Jim Culloty (IRE)	Dr. Ronan Lambe	13	2nd. (shd) On His Own 16/1; 3rd. (3/4 L) The Giant Bolster 14/1	6:43.88	
2015	Coneygree	7/1	8	Nico de Boinville	Mark Bradstock	The Max Partnership	16	2nd. (1 1/2 L) Djakadam 10/1; 3rd. (2 L) Road To Riches 8/1	6:42.50	
2016	Don Cossack	9/4F	9	Bryan Cooper	Gordon Elliott (IRE)	Gigginstown House Stud	9	2nd. (4 1/2 L) Djakadam 9/2; 3rd. (10 L) Don Poli 9/2	6:35.00	
2017	Sizing John	7/1	7	Robbie Power	Jessica Harrington (IRE)	Ann & Alan Potts	13	2nd. (2 3/4 L) Minella Rocco 18/1; 3rd. (shd) Native River 7/2	6:36.10	
2018	Native River	5/1	8	Richard Johnson	Colin Tizzard	Brocade Racing	15	2nd. (4 1/2 L) Might Bite 4/1F; 3rd. (4 L) Anibale Fly 33/1	7:02.60	
2019	Al Boum Photo	12/1	7	Paul Townend	Willie Mullins (IRE)	Mrs J Donnelly	16	2nd. (2 1/2 L) Anibale Fly 22/1; 3rd. (3 3/4 L) Bristol de Mai 18/1	6:39.06	
2020	Al Boum Photo	100/30F	8	Paul Townend	Willie Mullins (IRE)	Mrs J Donnelly	12	2nd. (nk) Santini 5/1; 3rd. (1 1/4 L) Lostintranslation 10/1	6:50.38	
2021	Minella Indo	9/1	8	Jack Kennedy	Henry De Bromhead (IRE)	Barry Maloney	12	2nd. (1 1/4 L) A Plus Tard 100/30; 3rd. (4 1/4 L) Al Boum Photo 9/4F	6:45.35	
2022	A Plus Tard	3/1F	8	Rachael Blackmore	Henry De Bromhead (IRE)	Cheveley Park Stud	11	2nd. (15 L) Minella Indo 6/1; 3rd. (2 1/2 L) Protektorat 11/1	6:41.75	
2023	Galopin Des Champs	7/5F	7	Paul Townend	Willie Mullins (IRE)	Mrs Audrey Turley	13	2nd. (7 L) Bravemansgame 6/1; 3rd. (6 1/2 L) Conflated 22/1	6:45.46	
2024	Galopin Des Champs	10/11F	8	Paul Townend	Willie Mullins (IRE)	Mrs Audrey Turley	13	2nd. (3 1/2 L) Gerri Colombe 13/2; 3rd. (9 L) Corach Rambler 14/1	7:05.14	
2025	Inothewayurthinkin	15/2	7	Mark Walsh	Gavin Cromwell (IRE)	J. P. McManus	9	2nd. (6 L) Galopin Des Champs 8/13F; 3rd. (12 L) Gentlemansgame 40/1	6:40.00	
2026	Gaelic Warrior	11/4 JF	8	Paul Townend	Willie Mullins (IRE)	Rich Ricci	10	2nd. (8 L) Jango Baie 11/4JF; 3rd. (2 L) Inothewayurthinkin 11/1	6:39.02	

^{1} The race was abandoned in 1931 because of frost, and in 1937 because of flooding.
^{2} It was cancelled in 1943 and 1944 because of World War II.
^{3} The 1957 winner, Linwell, was trained by Ivor Herbert, a well-known racing journalist and so barred from holding a trainer's licence.
^{4} Tied Cottage finished first in 1980, but was subsequently disqualified after testing positive for a banned substance.
^{5} The 2001 running was either completely cancelled or declared void due to a foot-and-mouth epidemic. A substitute race at Sandown was won by Marlborough.

== Race sponsors ==
Betfred began sponsoring the Gold Cup in 2012, after the betting company bought the Government-owned Tote in June 2011, but in late 2015 they lost their sponsorship following Jockey Club's and Arena Racing new initiative to not allow bookmaker sponsorships on their tracks that do not offer any contribution to horse racing from their offshore business. Only two weeks later a new sponsorship deal was announced with Timico, an independent internet service provider whose CEO Tim Radford is a horse owner having top chasers like Somersby and Racing Demon associated with his name. Timico also offered an increase of £25,000 to reach a total of £575,000 prize money for the 2016 Gold Cup renewal. It was the first time that the race had been sponsored by a non-bookmaker since the Tote took over from Piper Champagne in 1980. In July 2018 Cheltenham Racecourse announced Magners Irish Cider as the new Cheltenham Gold Cup sponsor until 2021 with a possible extension to 2022. Magners ended their sponsorship early, after the 2020 race, and the 2021 race carried the name of the charity WellChild. On 24 January 2022 it was announced luxury jeweller Boodles would sponsor the Cheltenham Gold Cup from 2022.

The Cheltenham Gold Cup has had the following sponsors:

- No sponsor before 1972
- Piper Champagne Cheltenham Gold Cup (1972 – 1979)
- Tote Cheltenham Gold Cup (1980 – 2003)
- totesport Cheltenham Gold Cup (2004 – 2011)
- Betfred Cheltenham Gold Cup (2012 – 2015)
- Timico Cheltenham Gold Cup (2016 – 2018)
- Magners Cheltenham Gold Cup (2019–2020)
- WellChild Cheltenham Gold Cup (2021)
- Boodles Cheltenham Gold Cup (2022-

== See also ==
- Horseracing in Great Britain
- List of British National Hunt races
- Cheltenham Festival
