= Frenchie Nicholson =

Jockey and trainer

Herbert Charles Denton "Frenchie" Nicholson (1913 - 1984) was a horse racing jockey and trainer.

Nicholson was born in France in 1913, where his father was a huntsman.

Nicholson acquired his nickname after having been apprenticed in the French city of Chantilly to Charles Clout, moving to Stanley Wooton's stable in Epsom to continue his training. He was broad and strong, and too heavy to be a flat jockey, so he became a jump jockey instead. He had a major success early on in his career, winning the 1936 Champion Hurdle on Victor Norman. He won the 1942 Cheltenham Gold Cup on Medoc II before the race was suspended for the remainder of the 2nd World War. Nicholson also rode the renowned Irish racehorse, Golden Miller. In 1946-47 he shared the Jockeys' Championship with Fred Rimell.

Following the war he worked as a trainer in Cheltenham and was prominent in the training of jockeys both for steeplechase and flat racing. He trained, amongst others, Pat Eddery, Walter Swinburn, Mouse Morris, Brough Scott and Paul Cook at his Prestbury stables. Nicholson's strengths included knowing when to praise a jockey and when to chastise him. Former apprentice, Paul Cook said, "When you rode a few winners, he would quickly put you back in your place. He once pinned me up against a wall and told me that I knew damn all. He said that he himself was still learning."

He retired in 1979 due to ill health and died in 1984.

== Personal life ==
He married Diana, a trainer's daughter and great-granddaughter of three times Grand National winning trainer William Holman. Nicholson's son, David was also a jockey and trainer.

== Bibliography ==
- Oakley, Robin (3 March 2014). The Cheltenham Festival: A Centenary History. Aurum Press Limited. pp. 52–. ISBN 978-1-78131-390-9.
- Wright, Howard (1986). The Encyclopaedia of Flat Racing. London: Robert Hale. ISBN 0-7090-2639-0.
