= Cottage Rake =

Irish-bred Thoroughbred racehorse (1939–1961)

- Sire: Cottage
- Grandsire: Tracery
- Dam: Hartingo
- Damsire: Hartford
- Sex: Gelding
- Foaled: 1939
- Died: 1961 (aged 21–22)
- Country: Ireland
- Colour: Bay
- Breeder: Richard Vaughan
- Owner: Frank Vickerman
- Trainer: Vincent O'Brien

Major wins
- Irish Cesarewitch (1947); Cheltenham Gold Cup (1948, 1949, 1950); King George VI Chase (1948)
- Last updated on 21 August 2024

Cottage Rake (1939–1961) was an Irish-bred, top-class National Hunt racehorse. His breeder was Richard Vaughan from Hunting Hall, Castletown Roche, County Cork, Ireland. Before he embarked on his jumping career, the horse was failed by a vet on three different examinations. On the last of these, the vet was overheard by young trainer Vincent O'Brien saying that the horse's wind infirmity would not interfere with his racing performance. O'Brien contacted wool merchant Frank Vickerman, who bought the horse to be trained by O'Brien. Cottage Rake ultimately set his trainer on the route to the top of the training ladder by becoming only the second horse to win the Cheltenham Gold Cup three years in a row. He achieved this hat-trick from 1948 to 1950, beating Finnure by ten lengths in the last of these races. His hardest-won triumph had come the previous year when he only got the better of Cool Customer in the final 100 yards. Such was his partnership with jockey Aubrey Brabazon that a verse was composed about their success. Cottage Rake lost his form after his third Cheltenham Gold Cup triumph. He moved over to Gerald Balding's stable in England, but the change of scenery did not resurrect his success.

== See also ==
- Repeat winners of horse races
