= King George VI Chase =

Steeplechase horse race in Britain

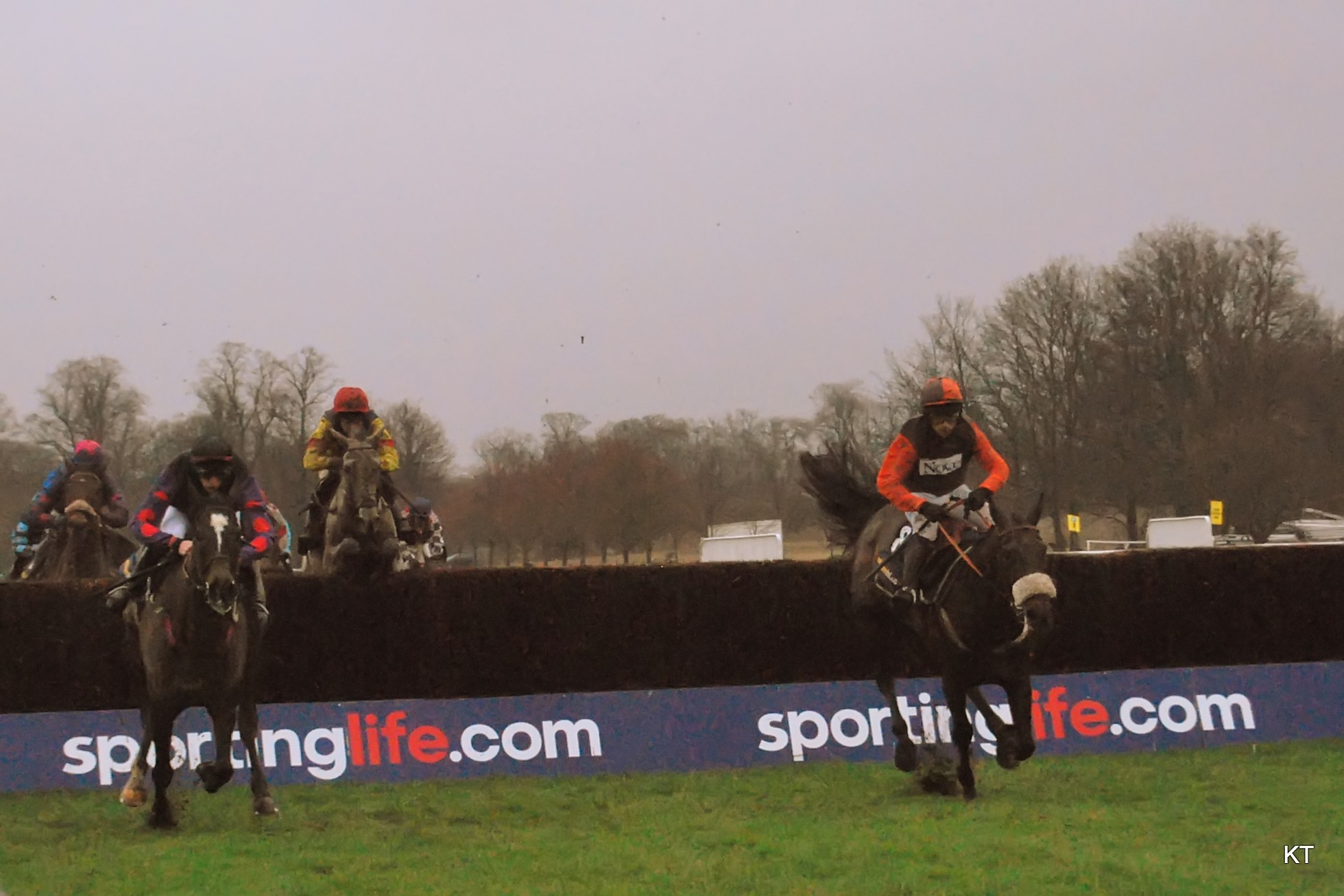
- The 2012 running, with its winner Long Run on the right
- Class: Grade 1
- Location: Kempton Park, Sunbury, England
- Inaugurated: 1937
- Race type: Steeplechase
- Sponsor: Ladbrokes
- Website: Kempton Park

Race information
- Distance: 3 miles (4,828 metres)
- Surface: Turf
- Track: Right-handed
- Qualification: Four-years-old and up
- Weight: 11 st 1 lb (4yo); 11 st 10 lb (5yo+); Allowances; 7 lb for fillies and mares
- Purse: £250,000 (2025); 1st: £142,375

King George VI Chase
2025
The Jukebox Man	Banbridge	Gaelic Warrior

Previous years
2024
Banbridge	Il Est Francais	L'Homme Presse
2023
Hewick	Bravemansgame	Allaho
2022
Bravemansgame	Royale Pagaille	Frodon
2021
Tornado Flyer	Clan Des Obeaux	Saint Calvados

2020–2011
2020
Frodon	Waiting Patiently	Clan Des Obeaux
2019
Clan Des Obeaux	Cyrname	Footpad
2018
Clan Des Obeaux	Thistlecrack	Native River
2017
Might Bite	Double Shuffle	Tea For Two
2016
Thistlecrack	Cue Card	Silviniaco Conti
2015
Cue Card	Vautour	Al Ferof
2014
Silviniaco Conti	Dynaste	Al Ferof
2013
Silviniaco Conti	Cue Card	Al Ferof
2012
Long Run	Captain Chris	Grands Crus
2011
Kauto Star	Long Run	Captain Chris

2010–2001
2010
Long Run	Riverside Theatre	Kauto Star
2009
Kauto Star	Madison Du Berlais	Barbers Shop
2008
Kauto Star	Albertas Run	Voy Por Ustedes
2007
Kauto Star	Our Vic	Exotic Dancer
2006
Kauto Star	Exotic Dancer	Racing Demon
2005
Kicking King	Monkerhostin	Impek
2004
Kicking King	Kingscliff	Azertyuiop
2003
Edredon Bleu	Tiutchev	First Gold
2002
Best Mate	Marlborough	Bacchanal
2001
Florida Pearl	Best Mate	Bacchanal

2000–1991
2000
First Gold	Florida Pearl	Bellator
1999
See More Business	Go Ballistic	Dr Leunt
1998
Teeton Mill	Escartefigue	Imperial Call
1997
See More Business	Challenger du Luc	Rough Quest
1996
One Man	Monsieur Le Cure	Master Oats
1996
One Man	Rough Quest	Barton Bank
1994
Algan	Monsieur Le Cure	Second Schedual
1993
Barton Bank	Bradbury Star	The Fellow
1992
The Fellow	Pat's Jester	The Illywhacker
1991
The Fellow	Docklands Express	Remittance Man

1990–1981
1990
Desert Orchid	Toby Tobias	The Fellow
1989
Desert Orchid	Barnbrook Again	Yahoo
1988
Desert Orchid	Kildimo	Vodkatini
1987
Nupsala	Desert Orchid	Golden Friend
1986
Desert Orchid	Door Latch	Bolands Cross
1985
Wayward Lad	Combs Ditch	Earls Brig
1984
Burrough Hill Lad	Combs Ditch	Wayward Lad
1983
Wayward Lad	Brown Chamberlin	The Mighty Mac
1982
Wayward Lad	Fifty Dollars More	Silver Buck

1980–1971
1980
Silver Buck	Anaglog's Daughter	Diamond Edge
1979
Silver Buck	Jack of Trumps	Border Incident
1978
Gay Spartan	Jack of Trumps	Chumson
1977
Bachelor's Hall	Uncle Bing	Royal Marshal
1976
Royal Marshal	Fort Devon	April Seventh
1975
Captain Christy	Bula	Royal Marshal
1974
Captain Christy	Pendil	Soothsayer
1973
Pendil	Inkslinger	The Dikler
1972
Pendil	The Dikler	Shawnigan
1971
The Dikler	Spanish Steps	Titus Oates

1970–1964
1969
Titus Oates	Flyingbolt	The Laird
1966
Dormant	Arkle	Maigret
1965
Arkle	Dormant	Arctic Ocean
1964
Frenchman's Cove	Jay Trump	Only two ran

The King George VI Chase is a Grade 1 National Hunt steeplechase in Great Britain which is open to horses aged four years or older. It is run at Kempton Park over a distance of about 3 miles (4,828 metres), and during its running there are eighteen fences to be jumped. The race is scheduled to take place each year on 26 December, and features as part of the course's Christmas Festival.

The event was first run in February 1937, and it was named in honour of the new British monarch, King George VI. It was only run twice before World War II, during which Kempton Park was closed for racing and used as a prisoner-of-war camp. The two pre-war runnings were each contested by four horses. The winner of the first, Southern Hero, remains the race's oldest ever winner. After the war the racecourse re-opened, and the event returned in 1947 on a new date – Boxing Day.

Fifteen horses have won the King George VI Chase more than once; Desert Orchid won it four times and Kauto Star won it five times. The race is currently sponsored by the Ladbrokes Coral bookmaking firm.

== Records ==
Most successful horse (5 wins):

- Kauto Star – 2006, 2007, 2008, 2009, 2011

Leading jockey (5 wins):

- Ruby Walsh – Kauto Star (2006, 2007, 2008, 2009, 2011)

Leading trainer (13 wins):

- Paul Nicholls – See More Business (1997, 1999), Kauto Star (2006, 2007, 2008, 2009, 2011), Silviniaco Conti (2013, 2014), Clan Des Obeaux (2018, 2019), Frodon (2020), Bravemansgame (2022)

== Winners ==
Year	Winner	Age	Jockey	Trainer
1937	Southern Hero	12	Jack Fawcus	Gwyn Evans
1938	Airgead Sios	8	Tommy McNeill	Charles Tabor
	no race 1939–46 (Note: During World War II Kempton Park was closed for racing and used as a reception centre for prisoners-of-war)
1947	Rowland Roy	8	Bryan Marshall	Fulke Walwyn
1948	Cottage Rake	9	Aubrey Brabazon	Vincent O'Brien
1949	Finnure	8	Dick Francis	George Beeby
1950	Manicou	5	Bryan Marshall	Peter Cazalet
1951	Statecraft	6	Tony Grantham	Peter Cazalet
1952	Halloween	7	Fred Winter	Bill Wightman
1953	Galloway Braes	8	Bert Morrow	Alec Kilpatrick
1954	Halloween	9	Fred Winter	Bill Wightman
1955	Limber Hill	8	Jimmy Power	Bill Dutton
1956	Rose Park	10	Michael Scudamore	Peter Cazalet
1957	Mandarin	6	Gerry Madden	Fulke Walwyn
1958	Lochroe	10	Arthur Freeman	Peter Cazalet
1959	Mandarin	8	Gerry Madden	Fulke Walwyn
1960	Saffron Tartan	9	Fred Winter	Don Butchers
1961	Abandoned due to frost
1962	Abandoned due to frost
1963	Mill House	6	Willie Robinson	Fulke Walwyn
1964	Frenchman's Cove	9	Stan Mellor	Harry Thomson Jones
1965	Arkle	8	Pat Taaffe	Tom Dreaper
1966	Dormant	9	Jeff King	John Wells-Kendrew
1967	Abandoned due to foot-and-mouth restrictions
1968	Abandoned due to frost
1969	Titus Oates	7	Stan Mellor	Gordon W. Richards
1970	Abandoned due to snow
1971	The Dikler	8	Barry Brogan	Fulke Walwyn
1972	Pendil	7	Richard Pitman	Fred Winter
1973	Pendil	8	Richard Pitman	Fred Winter
1974	Captain Christy	7	Bobby Coonan	Pat Taaffe
1975	Captain Christy	8	Gerry Newman	Pat Taaffe
1976	Royal Marshall II	9	Graham Thorner	Tim Forster
1977	Bachelor's Hall	7	Martin O'Halloran	Peter Cundell
1978	Gay Spartan	7	Tommy Carmody	Tony Dickinson
1979	Silver Buck	7	Tommy Carmody	Tony Dickinson
1980	Silver Buck	8	Tommy Carmody	Michael Dickinson
1981	Abandoned due to frost and snow
1982	Wayward Lad	7	John Francome	Michael Dickinson
1983	Wayward Lad	8	Robert Earnshaw	Michael Dickinson
1984	Burrough Hill Lad	8	John Francome	Jenny Pitman
1985	Wayward Lad	10	Graham Bradley	Monica Dickinson
1986	Desert Orchid	7	Simon Sherwood	David Elsworth
1987	Nupsala	8	André Pommier	François Doumen
1988	Desert Orchid	9	Simon Sherwood	David Elsworth
1989	Desert Orchid	10	Richard Dunwoody	David Elsworth
1990	Desert Orchid	11	Richard Dunwoody	David Elsworth
1991	The Fellow	6	Adam Kondrat	François Doumen
1992	The Fellow	7	Adam Kondrat	François Doumen
1993	Barton Bank	7	Adrian Maguire	David Nicholson
1994	Algan	6	Philippe Chevalier	François Doumen
1995 (Note: The "1995" race took place on 6 January 1996 at Sandown, having been postponed at Kempton due to snow and frost)	One Man	8	Richard Dunwoody	Gordon W. Richards
1996	One Man	8	Richard Dunwoody	Gordon W. Richards
1997	See More Business	7	Andrew Thornton	Paul Nicholls
1998	Teeton Mill	9	Norman Williamson	Venetia Williams
1999	See More Business	9	Mick Fitzgerald	Paul Nicholls
2000	First Gold	7	Thierry Doumen	François Doumen
2001	Florida Pearl	9	Adrian Maguire	Willie Mullins
2002	Best Mate	7	Tony McCoy	Henrietta Knight
2003	Edredon Bleu	11	Jim Culloty	Henrietta Knight
2004	Kicking King	6	Barry Geraghty	Tom Taaffe
2005 (Note: It was switched to Sandown in 2005 as Kempton was closed for redevelopment)	Kicking King	7	Barry Geraghty	Tom Taaffe
2006	Kauto Star	6	Ruby Walsh	Paul Nicholls
2007	Kauto Star	7	Ruby Walsh	Paul Nicholls
2008	Kauto Star	8	Ruby Walsh	Paul Nicholls
2009	Kauto Star	9	Ruby Walsh	Paul Nicholls
2010 (Note: The "2010" race took place on 15 January 2011 after Kempton Park's 2010 Boxing Day meeting was cancelled due to snow and frost)	Long Run	6	Sam Waley-Cohen (Note: amateur jockey)	Nicky Henderson
2011	Kauto Star	11	Ruby Walsh	Paul Nicholls
2012	Long Run	7	Sam Waley-Cohen	Nicky Henderson
2013	Silviniaco Conti	7	Noel Fehily	Paul Nicholls
2014	Silviniaco Conti	8	Noel Fehily	Paul Nicholls
2015	Cue Card	9	Paddy Brennan	Colin Tizzard
2016	Thistlecrack	8	Tom Scudamore	Colin Tizzard
2017	Might Bite	8	Nico de Boinville	Nicky Henderson
2018	Clan des Obeaux	6	Harry Cobden	Paul Nicholls
2019	Clan des Obeaux	7	Sam Twiston-Davies	Paul Nicholls
2020	Frodon	8	Bryony Frost	Paul Nicholls
2021	Tornado Flyer	8	Danny Mullins	Willie Mullins
2022	Bravemansgame	7	Harry Cobden	Paul Nicholls
2023	Hewick	8	Gavin Sheehan	John Joseph Hanlon
2024	Banbridge	8	Paul Townend	Joseph O'Brien
2025	The Jukebox Man	7	Ben Jones	Ben Pauling

== See also ==
- Horse racing in Great Britain
- List of British National Hunt races
