= 2002 Cheltenham Gold Cup =

The 2002 Cheltenham Gold Cup was a horse race which took place at Cheltenham on Thursday 14 March 2002. It was the 74th running of the Cheltenham Gold Cup, and it was won by Best Mate. The winner was ridden by Jim Culloty and trained by Henrietta Knight. The pre-race favourite Looks Like Trouble finished thirteenth.

It was the first running of the Gold Cup for two years, as it had been cancelled in 2001 because of a foot-and-mouth crisis.

== Race details ==
- Sponsor: Tote
- Winner's prize money: £174,000.00
- Going: Good
- Number of runners: 18
- Winner's time: 6m 50.1s

== Full result ==
| | * | Horse | Age | Jockey | Trainer ^{†} | SP |
| 1 | | Best Mate | 7 | Jim Culloty | Henrietta Knight | 7/1 |
| 2 | 1¾ | Commanche Court | 9 | Ruby Walsh | Ted Walsh (IRE) | 25/1 |
| 3 | 8 | See More Business | 12 | Joe Tizzard | Paul Nicholls | 40/1 |
| 4 | 6 | Marlborough | 10 | Dean Gallagher | Nicky Henderson | 12/1 |
| 5 | 5 | What's Up Boys | 8 | Paul Flynn | Philip Hobbs | 33/1 |
| 6 | ½ | Alexander Banquet | 9 | Barry Geraghty | Willie Mullins (IRE) | 12/1 |
| 7 | ¾ | Moscow Express | 10 | Shay Barry | Frances Crowley (IRE) | 66/1 |
| 8 | 12 | Cyfor Malta | 9 | Rodi Greene | Martin Pipe | 25/1 |
| 9 | 3 | Foxchapel King | 9 | David Casey | Mouse Morris (IRE) | 12/1 |
| 10 | 7 | Lord Noelie | 9 | Richard Guest | Henrietta Knight | 16/1 |
| 11 | ¾ | Florida Pearl | 10 | Conor O'Dwyer | Willie Mullins (IRE) | 10/1 |
| 12 | 6 | Bacchanal | 8 | Mick Fitzgerald | Nicky Henderson | 6/1 |
| 13 | dist | Looks Like Trouble | 10 | Richard Johnson | Noel Chance | 9/2 fav |
| Fell | Fence 22 | Sackville | 9 | John Cullen | Frances Crowley (IRE) | 33/1 |
| PU | Fence 21 | Go Ballistic | 13 | Carl Llewellyn | Henrietta Knight | 66/1 |
| PU | Fence 20 | Behrajan | 7 | Norman Williamson | Henry Daly | 11/1 |
| PU | Fence 19 | Shotgun Willy | 8 | Timmy Murphy | Paul Nicholls | 25/1 |
| PU | Fence 12 | Shooting Light | 9 | Tony McCoy | Martin Pipe | 10/1 |

* The distances between the horses are shown in lengths or shorter. PU = pulled-up.
† Trainers are based in Great Britain unless indicated.

== Winner's details ==
Further details of the winner, Best Mate:

- Foaled: 28 January 1995 in Ireland
- Sire: Un Desperado; Dam: Katday (Miller's Mate)
- Owner: Jim Lewis
- Breeder: Jacques Van't Hart
