= Terry Biddlecombe Challenge Trophy =

Desert Orchid South Western Pattern Chase
2004
Cameron Bridge	Kelrev	Lou Du Moulin Mas

Previous years
2003
Edredon Bleu	Exit Swinger	Tresor De Mai
2002
Valley Henry	Upgrade	Celibate
2001
Celibate	Eau de Cologne	Bellator
2000
Fadalko	The Outback Way	Celibate
1999
No Retreat	Ashwell Boy	Chief's Song
1998
Super Tactics	Bertone	Gales Cavalier
1997
Gales Cavalier	Mr Mulligan	Glemot
1996
Coulton	Gales Cavalier	Martomick
1995
Coulton	Amtrak Express	Grange Brake
1994
Givus A Buck	Bibendum	Egypt Mill Prince
1993
Panto Prince	Young Hustler	Kings Fountain

The Terry Biddlecombe Challenge Trophy was a Grade 2 National Hunt chase in England which was open to horses aged five years or older. It was run at Wincanton over a distance of 2 miles and 5 furlongs (4,224 metres), and was scheduled to take place each year in November.

The race was named in honour of the jockey Terry Biddlecombe and was last run in 2004. It was won by some of the great names in steeplechasing during the eighties, but the races were often uncompetitive with the winner starting long odds-on.

The race was awarded Grade 2 status in 1990, and the following year was renamed the Desert Orchid South Western Pattern Chase. In 1994 the race became a Limited Handicap, although it maintained its Grade 2 status.

In its final year it was run as the Desert Orchid Silver Cup, a Class C Handicap, with the Grade 2 status being transferred to the Old Roan Chase at Aintree, run on the same day. There is still a race at Wincanton, now sponsored, where the winning owner receives the Desert Orchid Silver Cup. Run in October it is now run over a distance of just less than 3 miles 3 furlongs.

== Winners ==
Year	Winner	Age	Jockey	Trainer
1974 (Note: The first running was over a distance of 3 miles 1 furlong.)	Clarification	7	Lord Oaksey	Roddy Armytage
1975	Rough House	9	John Burke	Fred Rimell
1976	April Seventh	10	Andy Turnell	Bob Turnell
1977	Border Incident	7	John Francome	Richard Head
1978	Kininvie	9	Philip Hobbs	A Dunn
1979	Silver Buck	7	Tommy Carmody	Tony Dickinson
1980	Diamond Edge	9	Bill Smith	Fulke Walwyn
1981	Silver Buck	9	Robert Earnshaw	Michael Dickinson
1982	Silver Buck	10	Robert Earnshaw	Michael Dickinson
1983	Brown Chamberlin	8	Ben de Haan	Fred Winter
1984	Wayward Lad	9	Robert Earnshaw	Michael Dickinson
1985	The Tsarevich	9	John White	Nicky Henderson
1986	Half Free	10	Peter Scudamore	Fred Winter
1987	Desert Orchid	8	Colin Brown	David Elsworth
1988	Desert Orchid	9	Simon Sherwood	David Elsworth
1989	Panto Prince	8	Brendan Powell Snr	Chris Popham
1990	Panto Prince	9	Brendan Powell Snr	Chris Popham
1991	Sabin Du Loir	12	Peter Scudamore	Martin Pipe
1992	Remittance Man	8	Richard Dunwoody	Nicky Henderson
1993	Panto Prince	12	Simon McNeill	Chris Popham
1994	Givus A Buck	11	Paul Holley	David Elsworth
1995	Coulton	8	Richard Dunwoody	Oliver Sherwood
1996	Coulton	9	Jamie Osborne	Oliver Sherwood
1997	Gales Cavalier	9	Adrian Maguire	David Gandolfo
1998	Super Tactics	10	Andrew Thornton	Robert Alner
1999	No Retreat	6	Tony Dobbin	Steve Brookshaw
2000	Fadalko	7	Mick Fitzgerald	Paul Nicholls
2001	Celibate	10	Noel Fehily	Charlie Mann
2002	Valley Henry	7	Mick Fitzgerald	Paul Nicholls
2003	Edredon Bleu	11	Jim Culloty	Henrietta Knight
2004	Cameron Bridge	8	Richard Johnson	Philip Hobbs
