= 2003 Cheltenham Gold Cup =

The 2003 Cheltenham Gold Cup was a horse race which took place at Cheltenham on Thursday 13 March 2003. It was the 75th running of the Cheltenham Gold Cup, and it was won by the pre-race favourite Best Mate. The winner was ridden by Jim Culloty and trained by Henrietta Knight.

Best Mate became the first horse to win consecutive runnings of the Gold Cup since L'Escargot in 1970 and 1971.

== Race details ==
- Sponsor: Tote
- Winner's prize money: £203,000.00
- Going: Good
- Number of runners: 15
- Winner's time: 6m 39.0s

== Full result ==
	*	Horse	Age	Jockey	Trainer ^{†}	SP
1		Best Mate	8	Jim Culloty	Henrietta Knight	13/8 fav
2	10	Truckers Tavern	8	Davy Russell	Ferdy Murphy	33/1
3	2½	Harbour Pilot	8	Paul Carberry	Noel Meade (IRE)	40/1
4	nk	Valley Henry	8	Barry Geraghty	Paul Nicholls	14/1
5	1½	Behrajan	8	Richard Johnson	Henry Daly	14/1
6	1½	Commanche Court	10	Ruby Walsh	Ted Walsh (IRE)	8/1
7	4	Chives	8	Richard Guest	Henrietta Knight	25/1
8	17	See More Business	13	Joe Tizzard	Paul Nicholls	16/1
9	¾	You're Agoodun	11	Tony McCoy	Martin Pipe	50/1
10	12	Colonel Braxton	8	Kieran Kelly	Dessie Hughes (IRE)	33/1
11	10	Marlborough	11	Mick Fitzgerald	Nicky Henderson	20/1
12	10	Modulor	11	Rodi Greene	Martin Pipe	200/1
PU	Fence 21	Hussard Collonges	8	Russ Garritty	Peter Beaumont	8/1
PU	Fence 20	First Gold	10	Thierry Doumen	François Doumen (FR)	33/1
Fell	Fence 3	Beef Or Salmon	7	Timmy Murphy	Michael Hourigan (IRE)	5/1

* The distances between the horses are shown in lengths or shorter. nk = neck; PU = pulled-up.
† Trainers are based in Great Britain unless indicated.

== Winner's details ==
Further details of the winner, Best Mate:

- Foaled: 28 January 1995 in Ireland
- Sire: Un Desperado; Dam: Katday (Miller's Mate)
- Owner: Jim Lewis
- Breeder: Jacques Van't Hart
