= 2004 Cheltenham Gold Cup =

The 2004 Cheltenham Gold Cup was a horse race which took place at Cheltenham on Thursday, 18 March 2004. It was the 76th running of the Cheltenham Gold Cup, and it was won by the pre-race favourite Best Mate. The winner was ridden by Jim Culloty and trained by Henrietta Knight.

With his third successive Gold Cup victory Best Mate became the fourth horse to win the race three times or more, and he was the first triple-winner since Arkle in the mid-1960s.

== Race details ==
- Sponsor: Totesport
- Winner's prize money: £203,000.00
- Going: Good
- Number of runners: 10
- Winner's time: 6m 42.6s

== Full result ==
	*	Horse	Age	Jockey	Trainer ^{†}	SP
1		Best Mate	9	Jim Culloty	Henrietta Knight	8/11 fav
2	½	Sir Rembrandt	8	Andrew Thornton	Robert Alner	33/1
3	1¼	Harbour Pilot	9	Paul Carberry	Noel Meade (IRE)	20/1
4	1¾	Beef Or Salmon	8	Timmy Murphy	Michael Hourigan (IRE)	10/1
5	10	First Gold	11	Thierry Doumen	François Doumen (FR)	12/1
6	dist	Keen Leader	8	Barry Geraghty	Jonjo O'Neill	10/1
7	4	Therealbandit	7	Tony McCoy	Martin Pipe	15/2
8	3	Alexander Banquet	11	Ruby Walsh	Willie Mullins (IRE)	80/1
PU	Fence 19	Truckers Tavern	9	Tony Dobbin	Ferdy Murphy	22/1
PU	Fence 15	Irish Hussar	8	Mick Fitzgerald	Nicky Henderson	16/1

* The distances between the horses are shown in lengths or shorter. PU = pulled-up.
† Trainers are based in Great Britain unless indicated.

== Winner's details ==
Further details of the winner, Best Mate:

- Foaled: 28 January 1995, in Ireland
- Sire: Un Desperado; Dam: Katday (Miller's Mate)
- Owner: Jim Lewis
- Breeder: Jacques Van't Hart
