= Mersey Novices' Hurdle =

Hurdle horse race in Britain

Mersey Novices' Hurdle
2026
Bossman Jack	Soldier Reeves	Ballyfad

Previous years
2025
Honesty Policy	Regent's Stroll	Funiculi Funicula
2024
Brighterdaysahead	Staffordshire Knot	Bugise Seagull
2023
Irish Point	Kateira	Hermes Allen
2022
Three Stripe Life	Might	North Lodge
2021
My Drogo	Minella Drama	Guard Your Dreams

2020-2011
2019
Reserve Tank	Brewin'upastorm	One For Rosie
2018
Black Op	Lostintranslation	Momella
2017
Finian's Oscar	Captain Forez	Messire Des Obeaux
2016
Yorkhill	Le Prezien	Flying Angel
2015
Nichols Canyon	Parlour Games	Three Musketeers
2014
Lac Fontana	Splash of Ginge	Dell' Arca
2013
Ubak	Utopie Des Bordes	Seefood
2012
Simonsig	Super Duty	Baby Shine
2011
Spirit Son	Cue Card	Rock on Ruby

2010-2001
2010
Peddlers Cross	Duke of Lucca	Najaf
2009
Bouggler	Copper Bleu	Ainama
2008
Elusive Dream	Whiteoak	Franchoek
2007
Tidal Bay	Wins Now	Bedlam Boy
2006
Natal	Blazing Bailey	Harmony Brig
2005
Turpin Green	My Way de Solzen	Mephisto
2004
Garde Champetre	Monet's Garden	Court Shareef
2003
Leinster	Crystal d'Ainay	Aine Dubh
2002
Classified	Eternal Spring	Boneyarrow
2001
Montalcino	Takeyourtime	Run For Paddy

2000-1991
2000
Best Mate	Copeland	Harvis
1999
Barton	Auetaler	Prominent Profile
1998
Promalee	Rainwatch	Samuel Wilderspin
1997
Sanmartino	Courbaril	Hurdante
1996
Silver Shred	Ashwell Boy	Escartefigue
1995
Tervel	Call My Guest	Putty Road
1994
Cyborgo	Monalee River	Large Action
1993
Lemon's Mill	Leotard	One Man
1992
Coulton	Oh What	Polishing
1991
Shannon Glen	Crystal Spirit	So Proud

1990-1988
1990
Vazon Bay	Remittance Man	Young Ty
1989
Morley Street	Trapper John	Undaunted
1988
Sir Blake	Blazing Walker	Decided

The Mersey Novices' Hurdle is a Grade One National Hunt hurdle race in Great Britain which is open to horses aged four years or older. It is run at Aintree, Merseyside, over a distance of about 2 miles and 4 furlongs (4,023 metres), and during its running there are eleven hurdles to be jumped. The race is for novice hurdlers, and it is scheduled to take place each year during the Grand National meeting in early April.

The distance of the race was cut by a furlong to its present length in 1988. For a period it was sponsored by Mumm, and it was given Grade Two status in 1991. It has had several different sponsors since 1992, and the latest of these, Betway, began supporting the event in 2017. The Mersey Novices' Hurdle was upgraded to Grade One by the British Horseracing Authority from its 2014 running.

The Mersey Novices' Hurdle often features horses which ran previously in the Ballymore Novices' Hurdle, and the last to achieve victory in both races was Yorkhill in 2016.

== Winners since 1976 ==
Year	Winner	Age	Jockey	Trainer
1976	Perversity	6	Andy Turnell	Bob Turnell
1977	Samuel Pepys	6	John Burke	Fred Rimell
1978	Raleighstown	7	Tommy Kinane	Christy Kinane
1979	Taffy	4	Tommy Carmody	Peter Bailey
1980	Wayward Lad	5	Tommy Carmody	Tony Dickinson
1981	Hareshaw	6	Tommy Carmody	Michael Dickinson
1982	Gallaher	6	Bill Smith	Fulke Walwyn
1983	Ballinacurra Lad	8	Pat Leech	John Crowley
1984	Lochboisdale	4	Steve Smith Eccles	Jeff King
1985	Out of the Gloom	4	Jonjo O'Neill	Reg Hollinshead
1986	Canute Express	5	Lorcan Wyer (Note: amateur jockey)	Homer Scott
1987	The West Awake	6	Simon Sherwood	Oliver Sherwood
1988	Sir Blake	7	Brendan Powell	David Elsworth
1989	Morley Street	5	Jimmy Frost	Toby Balding
1990	Vazon Bay	6	Mark Pitman	Jenny Pitman
1991	Shannon Glen	5	Michael Bowlby	Jenny Pitman
1992	Coulton	5	Graham McCourt	Mick Easterby
1993	Lemon's Mill	4	Peter Scudamore	Martin Pipe
1994	Cyborgo	4	Richard Dunwoody	Martin Pipe
1995	Tervel	4	Charlie Swan	Jeff Pearce
1996	Silver Shred	5	Jonothan Lower	Martin Pipe
1997	Sanmartino	5	Richard Dunwoody	David Nicholson
1998	Promalee	6	Charlie Swan	Aidan O'Brien
1999	Barton	6	Lorcan Wyer	Tim Easterby
2000	Best Mate	5	Jim Culloty	Henrietta Knight
2001	Montalcino	5	Brian Crowley	Venetia Williams
2002	Classified	6	Tony McCoy	Martin Pipe
2003	Leinster	6	Kieran Kelly	Dessie Hughes
2004	Garde Champetre	5	Ruby Walsh	Paul Nicholls
2005	Turpin Green	6	Tony Dobbin	Nicky Richards
2006	Natal	5	Ruby Walsh	Paul Nicholls
2007	Tidal Bay	6	Paddy Brennan	Howard Johnson
2008	Elusive Dream	7	Ruby Walsh	Paul Nicholls
2009	Bouggler	4	Noel Fehily	Emma Lavelle
2010	Peddlers Cross	5	Jason Maguire	Donald McCain, Jr.
2011	Spirit Son	5	Barry Geraghty	Nicky Henderson
2012	Simonsig	6	Barry Geraghty	Nicky Henderson
2013	Ubak	5	Jamie Moore	Gary Moore
2014	Lac Fontana	5	Tony McCoy	Paul Nicholls
2015	Nichols Canyon	5	Ruby Walsh	Willie Mullins
2016	Yorkhill	6	Paul Townend	Willie Mullins
2017	Finian's Oscar	5	Robbie Power	Colin Tizzard
2018	Black Op	7	Noel Fehily	Tom George
2019	Reserve Tank	5	Robbie Power	Colin Tizzard
	no race 2020 (Note: The 2020 running was cancelled because of the COVID-19 pandemic in the United Kingdom)
2021	My Drogo	6	Harry Skelton	Dan Skelton
2022	Three Stripe Life	6	Davy Russell	Gordon Elliott
2023	Irish Point	5	Davy Russell	Gordon Elliott
2024	Brighterdaysahead	5	Jack Kennedy	Gordon Elliott
2025	Honesty Policy	5	Mark Walsh	Gordon Elliott
2026	Bossman Jack	6	Harry Skelton	Dan Skelton

== See also ==
- Horse racing in Great Britain
- List of British National Hunt races
