= 2004 in sports =

2004 in sports describes the year's events in world sport.

== American football ==
- Super Bowl XXXVIII – the New England Patriots (AFC) won 32–29 over the Carolina Panthers (NFC)
  - Location: Reliant Stadium
  - Attendance: 71,525
  - MVP: Tom Brady, QB (New England)
- Sugar Bowl (2003 season):
  - The Louisiana State Tigers won 21–14 over the Oklahoma Sooners to win the BCS National Championship
- Rose Bowl (2003 season):
  - The Southern California Trojans won 28–14 over the Michigan Wolverines to win the AP Poll national championship
- August 8 – John Elway, Barry Sanders, Carl Eller and Bob Brown are inducted into the Pro Football Hall of Fame
- September 19 – Jerry Rice's record of 274 consecutive games with a pass reception comes to an end, although his Oakland Raiders defeat the Buffalo Bills, 13–10.
- September 26 – After Pittsburgh Steelers journeyman quarterback Tommy Maddox suffered an elbow injury during the 2nd game of the season, rookie quarterback Ben Roethlisberger, the 11th pick in the 2004 NFL draft made his first professional start in a Week 3 game vs the Miami Dolphins, a 13–3 win for the Steelers. Roethlisberger would start the remainder of the season and went 13-0 as a starter, the best start for a rookie quarterback since the 1970 AFL-NFL merger. The Steelers' impressive run would come to an end when they lost to the eventual Super Bowl champion New England Patriots 27–41 in the AFC Championship Game. This season marked the beginning of a new era for the Steelers, as Roethlisberger would lead them to 3 Super Bowl appearances, winning 2 of them. The Steelers also haven't had a losing record since this season as of 2020.
- September 27 – Morten Andersen appears in his 341st NFL game, breaking the record set by George Blanda.
- December 26 – Peyton Manning threw his 49th touchdown pass of the season in a game against the San Diego Chargers breaking Dan Marino's single season touchdown record

== Association football ==
- February 14 – Tunisia beat Morocco 2–1 to clinch the first African Cup of Nations in the country's history.
- May 15 – Arsenal complete their last game of the Premier League season with a victory, becoming the first team to go unbeaten for a whole season in the top division of English football since Preston North End in 1889.
- May 26 – Porto defeat AS Monaco 3–0 in the UEFA Champions League Final in Gelsenkirchen, Germany.
- April 28 – San Marino record their first international victory, defeating Liechtenstein 1–0.
- July 4 – Greece surprisingly win the UEFA Euro 2004 football tournament, defeating the host nation Portugal 1–0.
- July 25 – Brazil win the Copa América football tournament, defeating Argentina 4–2 on penalties.
- August 7 – Japan win the 2004 Asian Cup football tournament, defeating China 3–1.
- August 26 – United States win the Olympic women's football tournament, defeating Brazil 2–1 in extra time.
- August 28 – Argentina win the Olympic men's football tournament, defeating Paraguay 1–0.
- September 20 – death of Brian Clough, 69, English manager who won successive European Cups in 1979 and 1980 as manager of Nottingham Forest
- October 27 – death of Serginho, 30, Brazilian player who suffered a fatal heart attack during a Campeonato Brasileiro match
- December 17 – Boca Juniors defeats Bolívar 2–1 on aggregate to win the Copa Sudamericana final in Buenos Aires

== Athletics ==
- August – Athletics at the 2004 Summer Olympics held at Athens

== Australian rules football ==
- Australian Football League
  - Port Adelaide wins the 108th AFL premiership (Port Adelaide 17.11 (113) d Brisbane Lions 10.13 (73))
  - Brownlow Medal awarded to Chris Judd (West Coast Eagles)
  - See also 2004 AFL season

== Baseball ==
- June 27 College World Series – Cal State Fullerton wins the NCAA College World Series, defeating Texas 3–2 to win the best-of-three championship series 2–0.
- September 17 – At San Francisco, Barry Bonds becomes just the third player in MLB history to hit 700 home runs. Bonds joined the select company of Hall of Famers Hank Aaron (755) and Babe Ruth (714) with his historic blast off San Diego Padres Jake Peavy in the third inning.
- September 17 – At Seattle, Ichiro Suzuki hits his 199th single of the season, breaking the major league baseball record of 198, set by Lloyd Waner in 1927.
- September 29 – Major League Baseball announces that the Montreal Expos will be moved to the Washington, D.C. area for the 2005 season.
- October 1 – Ichiro Suzuki of the Seattle Mariners gets two base hits to break the 83-year-old record for most hits in a single season. The previous record, held by George Sisler, was 257 hits in a season.
- October 25 – The Seibu Lions win the Japan Series with a 4–3 series win over the Chunichi Dragons.
- October 27 – The Boston Red Sox sweep the St. Louis Cardinals, four games to none, to win the World Series for the first time in 86 years.
- October 29 – Tohoku Eagles officially founded in Sendai, Japan.

== Basketball ==
- NBA Finals – The Detroit Pistons, in a major upset, defeat the heavily favored Los Angeles Lakers, 4 games to 1. It is the Pistons first NBA title in fourteen years, and the third in franchise history.
- WNBA Finals – The Seattle Storm defeat the Connecticut Sun in three games.
- NCAA Men's Basketball Championship
  - The Connecticut Huskies win 82–73 over the Georgia Tech Yellow Jackets. UConn's Emeka Okafor is named Most Outstanding Player of the Final Four.
- NCAA Women's Basketball Championship
  - The following day, the UConn women follow suit, defeating the Tennessee Lady Volunteers 70–61, making UConn the first school to win both the NCAA Division I men's and women's basketball championships in the same season. UConn's Diana Taurasi is named the Most Outstanding Player of the Final Four.
- Euroleague – Maccabi Tel Aviv of Israel wins the final 118–74 over Fortitudo Bologna of Italy.
- Chinese Basketball Association finals: Guangdong Southern Tigers defeat Bayi Rockets, 3 games to 1.
- National Basketball League (Australia) – Sydney Kings defeated the West Sydney Razorbacks 3–2 in best-of-five final series.

== Boxing ==
- February 19 to February 29 – 35th European Amateur Boxing Championships held in Pula, Croatia
- March 13 – World Junior Middleweight Championship unified as Shane Mosley lost to Winky Wright.
- May 15 – Antonio Tarver won the WBC light-heavyweight title with a second-round knockout of champion Roy Jones Jr.
- July 30 – Danny Williams knocks out Mike Tyson in the fourth round of a non-championship bout.
- August 16 – Robert Quiroga, former International Boxing Federation super flyweight champion, found stabbed to death.
- September 18 – Bernard Hopkins successfully defends his undisputed middleweight title with a ninth-round knockout of Oscar De La Hoya.

== Canadian football ==
- November 21 – the Toronto Argonauts win the 92nd Grey Cup game, defeating the BC Lions 27–19 at Frank Clair Stadium in Ottawa.

== Cricket ==
- March 12 – Shane Warne becomes the first spinner in history to take 500 Test wickets
- March 13 – India beat Pakistan in the highest scoring One Day International ever (693 runs), in the opening match of their first Pakistan tour since 1989
- April 2 – Zimbabwe Cricket Union announces the retirement of Heath Streak as captain of Zimbabwe. It is later revealed he was sacked, and 15 senior players withdraw from Zimbabwean cricket, citing political interference by Robert Mugabe's government in team selection.
- April 12 – West Indies' Brian Lara regains the individual Test innings record from Matthew Hayden with 400 not out in the fourth Test against England in St. John's, Antigua
- May 8 – Sri Lanka's Muttiah Muralitharan breaks Courtney Walsh's world record of 519 Test wickets with his 520th wicket against Zimbabwe in Harare
- June 10 – Zimbabwe Cricket Union agrees to abandon any further Test matches in 2004, under pressure from International Cricket Council over substandard teams due to 15 striking players.
- September 10 – September 25 – ICC Champions Trophy in England – West Indies beats England in the final.

== Curling ==
- 2004 Ford World Curling Championship
  - Women's Final: (April 24) Canada (Colleen Jones) 8-4 Norway (Dordi Nordby)
  - Men's Final: (April 25) Sweden (Peja Lindholm) 7-6 Germany (Sebastian Stock)

== Cycle racing ==
Road bicycle racing

- Giro d'Italia won by Damiano Cunego of Italy. Sprinter Alessandro Petacchi wins nine stages. See 2004 Giro d'Italia
- Tour de France won by Lance Armstrong, his record-setting sixth consecutive title.

Cyclo-cross

- UCI Cyclo-cross World Championships
  - Men's Competition – Bart Wellens
  - Women's Competition – Laurence Leboucher

== Field hockey ==
- Olympic Games (Men's Competition): Australia
- Olympic Games (Women's Competition): Germany
- Men's Champions Trophy: Spain
- Women's Champions Trophy: Netherlands

== Figure skating ==
- World Figure Skating Championships
  - Men's champion: Evgeni Plushenko, Russia
  - Ladies' champion: Shizuka Arakawa, Japan
  - Pair skating champions: Tatiana Totmianina and Maxim Marinin, Russia
  - Ice dancing champions: Tatiana Navka and Roman Kostomarov, Russia

== Floorball ==
- Men's World Floorball Championships
  - Champion: Sweden defeated the Czech Republic 6:4
- Women's under-19 World Floorball Championships
  - Champion: Sweden
- European Cup
  - Men's champion: Pixbo Wallenstam IBK
  - Women's champion: SC Classic

== Gaelic Athletic Association ==
- Camogie
  - All-Ireland Camogie Champion: Tipperary
  - National Camogie League: Tipperary
- Gaelic football
  - All-Ireland Senior Football Championship – Kerry 1-20 died Mayo 2-9
  - National Football League – Kerry 3-11 died Galway 1-16
  - Tommy Murphy Cup – Clare 1-11 died Sligo 0-11
- Ladies' Gaelic football
  - All-Ireland Senior Football Champion: Galway
  - National Football League: Mayo
- Hurling
  - All-Ireland Senior Hurling Championship – Cork 0-17 died Kilkenny 0-9
  - National Hurling League – Galway beat Waterford

== Gliding ==
- World Gliding Championships held at Elverum, Norway
  - Club Class Winner: Sebastian Kawa, Poland; Glider: SZD-48-3M Brawo

== Golf ==
Men's professional

- Major Championships
  - Masters Tournament – Phil Mickelson wins the first major of his career.
  - U.S. Open – Retief Goosen wins his second U.S. Open title.
  - British Open – Todd Hamilton, a virtual unknown, wins at Royal Troon in a playoff over Ernie Els.
  - PGA Championship – Vijay Singh wins in a three-hole playoff over Chris DiMarco and Justin Leonard.
- Team Europe defeats Team USA 18 1/2 – 9 1/2 to retain the Ryder Cup.

Men's amateur

- British Amateur – Stuart Wilson
- U.S. Amateur – Ryan Moore
- European Amateur – Matthew Richardson

Women's professional

- Kraft Nabisco Championship – Grace Park wins the first major of the LPGA season, by one shot over 17-year-old Aree Song. Michelle Wie finished fourth, four shots behind Park.
- LPGA Championship – Annika Sörenstam
- U.S. Women's Open – Meg Mallon
- Women's British Open – Karen Stupples
- LPGA Tour money leader – Annika Sörenstam – $2,544,707

== Handball ==
- 2004 European Men's Handball Championship: Germany
- 2004 European Women's Handball Championship: Norway

== Harness racing ==
- Windsong's Legacy becomes the seventh horse to win the North American Trotting Triple Crown.

== Horse racing ==
Steeplechases

- Cheltenham Gold Cup – Best Mate wins a third consecutive time
- Grand National – Amberleigh House

Flat races

- Australia – Melbourne Cup won by Makybe Diva
- Canada – Queen's Plate won by Niigon
- Dubai – Dubai World Cup won by Pleasantly Perfect
- France – Prix de l'Arc de Triomphe won by Bago
- Ireland – Irish Derby Stakes won by Grey Swallow
- Japan – Japan Cup won by Zenno Rob Roy
- English Triple Crown Races:
  1. 2,000 Guineas Stakes – Haafhd
  2. The Derby – North Light
  3. St. Leger Stakes – Rule of Law
- United States Triple Crown Races:
  1. Kentucky Derby – Smarty Jones
  2. Preakness Stakes – Smarty Jones by a record margin of 11½ lengths
  3. Belmont Stakes – Birdstone
- Breeders' Cup World Thoroughbred Championships:
  1. Breeders' Cup Classic – Ghostzapper
  2. Breeders' Cup Distaff – Ashado
  3. Breeders' Cup Filly & Mare Turf – Ouija Board
  4. Breeders' Cup Juvenile – Wilko
  5. Breeders' Cup Juvenile Fillies – Sweet Catomine
  6. Breeders' Cup Mile – Singletary
  7. Breeders' Cup Sprint – Speightstown
  8. Breeders' Cup Turf – Better Talk Now

== Ice hockey ==
- February 12 – An independent audit by Arthur Levitt reveals that National Hockey League teams lost a collective US$273 million in 2003, and suggests the league is "on the road to oblivion."
- 2004 Women's World Ice Hockey Championships at Halifax, Nova Scotia – Canada defeats USA 2–0 in the final
- 2004 Men's World Ice Hockey Championships held at Prague – Canada defeats Sweden 5–3 in the final
- Stanley Cup – Tampa Bay Lightning defeats Calgary Flames 4 games to 3
- 2004 World Cup of Hockey held at Toronto – Canada 3-2 Finland
- September 15 – NHL collective bargaining agreement expires. Commissioner Gary Bettman announces a lockout of NHLPA players.

== Kabaddi ==
- November 21 – India wins the first-ever World Cup kabaddi championship defeating Iran in the final held at Mumbai.

== Lacrosse ==
- February 22 – National Lacrosse League – The East Division All-Stars defeat the West Division All-Stars 19–15 in the All Star Game.
- May 7 – National Lacrosse League – Calgary Roughnecks defeat Buffalo Bandits 14–11 to win Champion's Cup
- May 30 – LeMoyne College defeats Limestone 11-10 (2OT) for first Division II National Championship.
- August – European Lacrosse Championships
  - Men's – England defeats Germany
  - Women's – Wales A defeats Scotland A
- August 22 – Major League Lacrosse – Philadelphia Barrage defeat Boston Cannons 13–11 to win league championship at Boston
- Clarington Green Gaels win the Founders Cup
- Peterborough Lakers win the Mann Cup
- Burnaby Lakers win the Minto Cup

== Mixed martial arts ==
The following is a list of major noteworthy MMA events during 2004 in chronological order.

Date	Event	Alternate Name/s	Location	Attendance	PPV Buyrate	Notes
January 16	WEC 9: Cold Blooded	—	Lemoore, California, United States	—	—	—
January 31	UFC 46: Supernatural	—	Las Vegas, United States	10,700	80,000	—
February 1	Pride 27: Inferno	—	Osaka, Japan	13,366	—	—
February 15	Pride Bushido 2	—	Yokohama, Japan	—	—	—
March 14	K-1 Beast 2004 in Niigata	—	Niigata, Japan	—	—	Event featured five K-1 kickboxing bouts, and four K-1 MMA bouts.
April 2	UFC 47: It's On!	—	Las Vegas, Nevada, United States	11,437	105,000	This event featured a highly anticipated fight between Chuck Liddell and Tito Ortiz.
April 25	Pride Total Elimination 2004	—	Saitama, Japan	42,110	—	Opening round to Pride GP 2004 heavyweight tournament.
May 21	WEC 10: Bragging Rights	—	Lemoore, California, United States	—	—	—
May 22	K-1 MMA ROMANEX	—	Saitama, Japan	14,918	—	—
May 23	Pride Bushido 3	—	Yokohama, Japan	—	—	This event was highlighted by three fights between Team Gracie and Team Japan.
June 19	UFC 48: Payback	—	Las Vegas, Nevada, United States	10,000	110,000	—
June 20	Pride Critical Countdown 2004	—	Saitama, Japan	43,711	—	Quarterfinals to Pride GP 2004 heavyweight tournament.
July 19	Pride Bushido 4	—	Nagoya, Japan	—	—	This event was highlighted by three fights between Brazilian Top Team and Team Japan.
August 15	Pride Final Conflict 2004	—	Saitama, Japan	47,629	—	Semifinals and final to Pride GP 2004 heavyweight tournament. The final between, Fedor Emelianenko and Antônio Rodrigo Nogueira ended in a no contest. A rematch for the final was rescheduled for Pride Shockwave 2004.
August 21	UFC 49: Unfinished Business	—	Paradise, Nevada, United States	12,100	80,000	—
October 14	Pride Bushido 5	—	Osaka, Japan	—	—	—
October 21	WEC 12: Halloween Fury 3	—	Lemoore, California, United States	—	—	—
October 22	UFC 50: The War of '04	—	Atlantic City, New Jersey, United States	9,000	40,000	—
October 31	Pride 28: High Octane	—	Saitama, Japan	24,028	—	—
November 20	K-1 Fighting Network Rumble on the Rock 2004	—	Honolulu, Hawaii, United States	13,000	—	—
December 31	Pride Shockwave 2004	—	Saitama, Japan	48,398	—	Fedor Emelianenko becomes the Pride 2004 heavyweight Grand Prix champion.
December 31	K-1 PREMIUM 2004 Dynamite!!	—	Osaka, Japan	52,918	—	Event featured seven K-1 MMA bouts, three K-1 kickboxing bouts, and one special mixed rules bout.

== Orienteering ==
- First ever World Championship in Trail Orienteering held September 15–18 in Västerås, Sweden

== Netball ==
- 5 July – the reigning world champions, New Zealand's Silver Ferns, complete 3-0 Test series win over Australia with 53–46 win at Hamilton, New Zealand.

== Radiosport ==
- Twelfth Amateur Radio Direction Finding World Championship held in Brno, Czech Republic

== Rugby league ==
- February 13 at Huddersfield, England – 2004 World Club Challenge match is won by the Bradford Bulls 22–4 against Penrith Panthers at Alfred McAlpine Stadium before 18,962
- April 23 at Newcastle, Australia – 2004 ANZAC Test match is won by Australia 37–10 over New Zealand at EnergyAustralia Stadium before 21,537
- May 15 at Millennium Stadium, Cardiff – 2004 Challenge Cup tournament won by St. Helens with a 32–16 win over Wigan Warriors in the final before 73,734.
- June 17 – Martin Gleeson and Sean Long are banned for four and three months respectively after placing bets on their side, St. Helens, to lose a Super League match against the Bradford Bulls
- October 3 – Canterbury Bulldogs defeats Sydney Roosters 16–13 in the Grand Final to win the NRL premiership
- October 16 – Leeds Rhinos defeats Bradford Bulls 16–8 in the Super League Grand Final to become champions of Super League IX
- November 27 – Australia defeats Great Britain 44–4 in the final of the second Tri-Nations competition

== Rugby union ==
- 110th Six Nations Championship series is won by France who complete the Grand Slam
- Super 12 Final – ACT Brumbies defeated Crusaders 47-38
- Heineken Cup Final – London Wasps defeated Toulouse 27-20
- Tri Nations Series – South Africa win due to bonus points, after all sides finish with two wins and two losses
- New Zealand retain the Bledisloe Cup

== Ski mountaineering ==
- March – 2004 World Championship of Skimountaineering held at Aran Valley, Spain

== Snooker ==
- World Snooker Championship – Ronnie O'Sullivan beats Graeme Dott 18-8
- World rankings – Ronnie O'Sullivan becomes world number one for 2004-05
- October 16 – in a qualifying match for the UK Championship, Jamie Burnett makes a break of 148 against Leo Fernandez and becomes the first player to achieve a break higher than the nominal maximum of 147 in a professional match.

== Snowboarding ==
- September 19 – death of Line Oestvold, 26, Norwegian snowboarder, after a crash in training in Chile.

== Speed skating ==
- February 7–9 – 2004 World Allround Speed Skating Championships held at Hamar, Norway
  - Men's all-around champion: Chad Hedrick (USA) 150.478
  - Ladies' all-around champion: Renate Groenewold (Netherlands) 162.573

== Swimming ==
- January 13–14 – World Cup (short course) held at Stockholm
- January 18 – Yang Yu sets a world record in the women's 200m butterfly (short course) in Berlin with a time of 2:04.04, exactly four years after the previous record was set.
- March 25 – Frédérick Bousquet breaks the world record in the men's 50m freestyle (short course) at New York City, clocking 21.10
- May 5–16 – 27th European LC Championships held at Madrid
  - Russia wins the most medals (16) and Ukraine the most gold medals (9)
- August 14–22 – Swimming at the 2004 Summer Olympics held at Athens
  - USA wins the most medals (28) and the most gold medals (12)
- (October 7–11) – 7th World Short Course Championships held at Indianapolis
  - USA wins the most medals (41) and the most gold medals (21)
- December 9–12 – 8th European SC Championships held at Vienna
  - Germany wins the most medals (22) and the most gold medals (9)

== Tennis ==
- Australian Open
  - Men's Final: Roger Federer defeats Marat Safin, 7-6(7-3) 6-4 6-2
  - Women's Final: Justine Henin-Hardenne defeats Kim Clijsters, 6-3 4-6 6-3
- French Open
  - Men's Final: Gastón Gaudio defeats Guillermo Coria 0-6 3-6 6-4 6-1 8-6
  - Women's Final: Anastasia Myskina defeats Elena Dementieva 6-1 6-2
- Wimbledon Championships
  - Men's Final: Roger Federer defeats Andy Roddick, 4-6 7-5 7-6(7-3) 6-3
  - Ladies' Final: Maria Sharapova defeats Serena Williams, 6-1 6-4
- U.S. Open
  - Men's Final: Roger Federer defeats Lleyton Hewitt 6-0 7-6 (7-3) 6-0
  - Women's Final: Svetlana Kuznetsova defeats Elena Dementieva 6-3 7-5
- 2004 Summer Olympics
  - Men's Singles Competition: Nicolás Massú
  - Women's Singles Competition: Justine Henin-Hardenne
  - Men's Doubles Competition: Fernando González & Nicolás Massú
  - Women's Doubles Competition: Li Ting & Sun Tiantian

== Volleyball ==
- Volleyball at the 2004 Summer Olympics – Men's volleyball: Brazil
- Volleyball at the 2004 Summer Olympics – Women's volleyball: China
- Men's World League: Brazil
- Women's World Grand Prix: Brazil

== Water polo ==
- 2004 FINA Men's Water Polo World League: Hungary
- 2004 FINA Women's Water Polo World League: USA

== Wrestling ==
- WWE March 14, 2004 – At WrestleMania XX, Chris Benoit defeated Triple H and Shawn Michaels to capture the World Heavyweight Championship when he submitted Triple H to the Crippler Crossface submission hold

== Multi-sport events ==
- 2004 Summer Olympics held from August 13 to August 29 in Athens. Leading medal winners:

Rank	Nation	Gold	Silver	Bronze	Total
1	United States (USA)	36	39	27	102
2	China (CHN)	32	17	14	63
3	Russia (RUS)	27	27	38	92
4	Australia (AUS)	17	16	16	49
5	Japan (JPN)	16	9	12	37
Totals (5 entries)		128	108	107	343

- 2004 Summer Paralympics held from September 17 to September 28 in Athens
- 10th Pan Arab Games held in Algiers

== Awards ==
- Associated Press Male Athlete of the Year – Lance Armstrong, Cycling
- Associated Press Female Athlete of the Year – Annika Sörenstam, LPGA golf
