= John Bull Chase =

Discontinued horse race at Wincanton Racecourse

John Bull Chase
2003
Edredon Bleu	Poliantas	Castle Prince

Previous years
2002
Looks Like Trouble	Celibate	Upgrade
2001
Bellator	King of Sparta	Super Tactics

2000-1991
2000
Wayward King	Double Thriller	Prince Sorinieres
1999
The Land Agent	Mulligan	Wayward King
1998
Callisoe Bay	Stately Home	Only two finished
1996
Dublin Flyer	Travado	Viking Flagship
1995
Lusty Light	Bradbury Star	Bang on Target
1994
Deep Sensation	Elfast	Toby Tobias
1993
Sabin Du Loir	Ryde Again	Docklands Express
1992
Toby Tobias	Ghofar	Cavvies Clown
1991
Panto Prince	Oklaoma	Rusch De Farges

1990-1988
1990
Toby Tobias	Pegwell Bay	The Fruit
1989
Cavvies Clown	Bolands Cross	Western Sunset
1988
Ten Plus	Western Sunset	Only two finished

The John Bull Chase was a National Hunt Conditions chase in England which was open to horses aged five years or older. It was run at Wincanton over a distance of 2 miles and 5 furlongs (4,224 metres), and was scheduled to take place each year in January.

The race was last run in 2003.

== Winners ==
Year	Winner	Age	Jockey	Trainer
1972	The Laird	11	Jeff King	Bob Turnell
1973	The Dikler	10	Barry Brogan	Fulke Walwyn
1974	The Dikler	11	Ron Barry	Fulke Walwyn
1975	Soothsayer	8	John Francome	Fred Winter
1976	Polymic	10	Graham Thorner	J Cobden
1977	Abandoned due to frost and snow
1978	Royal Frolic	9	John Burke	Fred Rimell
1979	Royal Mail	9	Philip Blacker	Stan Mellor
1980	Diamond Edge	9	Bill Smith	Fulke Walwyn
1981	Dramatist	10	Bill Smith	Fulke Walwyn
1982	Abandoned due to snow
1983	Get Out Of Me Way	8	Paul Barton	Graham Thorner
1984	Silver Buck	12	Robert Earnshaw	Michael Dickinson
1985	Abandoned due to snow
1986	Combs Ditch	10	Colin Brown	David Elsworth
1987	Abandoned due to frost
1988	Ten Plus^{[1]}	8	Kevin Mooney	Fulke Walwyn
1989	Cavvies Clown	9	Ross Arnott	David Elsworth
1990	Toby Tobias	8	Mark Pitman	Jenny Pitman
1991	Panto Prince	10	Brendan Powell Snr	Chris Popham
1992	Toby Tobias	10	Mark Pitman	Jenny Pitman
1993	Sabin Du Loir	14	Peter Scudamore	Martin Pipe
1994	Deep Sensation	9	Declan Murphy	Josh Gifford
1995	Lusty Light	9	Warren Marston	Jenny Pitman
1996	Dublin Flyer	10	Brendan Powell Snr	Capt Tim Forster
1997	Abandoned due to frost
1998	Callisoe Bay	9	Justin McCarthy	Oliver Sherwood
1999	The Land Agent	8	Mick Fitzgerald	Jimmy Mullins
2000	Wayward King	8	Mick Fitzgerald	Ron Hodges
2001	Bellator	8	Norman Williamson	Venetia Williams
2002	Looks Like Trouble	10	Seamus Durack	Noel Chance
2003	Edredon Bleu	11	Jim Culloty	Henrietta Knight

^{1} The race was won by Cavvies Clown, but he was subsequently disqualified for failing a dope test.

== See also ==
- Horseracing in Great Britain
- List of British National Hunt races
