= Peterborough Chase =

Steeplechase horse race in Britain

Peterborough Chase
2025
Djelo	Edwardstone	Hitman

Previous years
2024
Djelo	Protektorat	Ginny's Destiny
2022
Pic D'Orhy	Millers Bank	First Flow
2021
First Flow	Funambule Sivola	Eldorado Allen

2020-2011
2020
Mister Fisher	Kalashnikov	Clondaw Castle
2019
Top Notch	Kauto Riko	La Bague Au Roi
2018
Charbel	God's Own	Tea For Two
2017
Top Notch	Josses Hill	Ptit Zig
2016
Josses Hill	Tea For Two	More of That
2015
Al Ferof	Pepite Rose	Wishfull Thinking
2014
Wishfull Thinking	Eduard	Wonderful Charm
2013
Riverside Theatre	Champion Court	Captain Chris
2012
Menorah	Hunt Ball	Ghizao
2011
Gauvain	Somersby	Mr Moonshine

2010-2001
2010
Tartak	Breedsbreeze	Herecomesthetruth
2009
Deep Purple	Tartak	Albertas Run
2008
Monet's Garden	Snoopy Loopy	Mister McGoldrick
2007
Racing Demon	Natal	Only two ran
2006
Racing Demon	Thisthatandtother	Monkerhostin
2005
Impek	Monkerhostin	Thisthatandtother
2004
Le Roi Miguel	Farmer Jack	Hot Shots
2003
Jair Du Cochet	Best Mate	Valley Henry
2002
Best Mate	Douze Douze	Geos
2001
Edredon Bleu	Geos	Young Spartacus

2000-1991
2000
Edredon Bleu	Fadalko	The Outback Way
1999
Edredon Bleu	Or Royal	Mulligan
1998
Edredon Bleu	Bertone	Or Royal
1997
One Man	Viking Flagship	Camitrov
1996
Dublin Flyer	Gales Cavalier	Kadi
1995
Travado	Martha's Son	Docklands Express
1994
Martha's Son	Deep Sensation	Egypt Mill Prince
1993
Travado	Deep Sensation	Brandeston
1992
Remittance Man	Emsee-H	Sirrah Jay
1991
Sabin Du Loir	Norton's Coin	Desert Orchid

1990-1987
1990
Pegwell Bay	Comandante	Cuddy Dale
1989
Clever Folly	Repington	Southernair
1988
Townley Stone	Clay Hill	Only two finished
1987
Very Promising	Townley Stone	Kathies Lad

The Peterborough Chase is a Grade 2 National Hunt chase in Great Britain which is open to horses aged four years or older. It is run at Huntingdon over a distance of about 2 miles and 4 furlongs (2 miles, 3 furlongs and 189 yards, or 3,995 metres), and during its running there are sixteen fences to be jumped. The race is currently scheduled for December. In 2019, the race's total prize fund was £65,000.

A race called the Peterborough Handicap Chase, over three miles, was first run on Tuesday 2 December 1969. It was a new meeting with Huntingdon's fixture allocation having been increased from six days to nine days for the 1969/70 season. It remained a three-mile handicap chase until 1977, after which it became a conditions chase over 2 1/2 miles.

The first running as a 2 1/2-mile conditions chase was in 1978 when it was run as the F A Standen Chase. It was first run under the name of the Peterborough Chase in 1979.

From its inception in 1969 it was always run on a Tuesday until 1997. It was moved to a Saturday in 1998 and remained so until 2007. In 2008 it was first run on a Thursday. The race was on a Sunday for the first time in 2014.

The only year the race was not run was in 1982 when the meeting was abandoned due to fog. In 1985 it was run as the Waterloo Meadows Centenary Chase.

The most successful horse in the race's history is Edredon Bleu, who won four consecutive runnings between 1998 and 2001. Wayward Lad (1981, 1983), Travado (1993, 1995), Racing Demon (2006, 2007) and Top Notch (2017, 2019) are the only other multiple winners of the race. The 2018 running was titled the Edredon Bleu Chase to honour the horse, who died in October 2018.

Courtesy of Edredon Bleu's four wins, Racing Demon's two victories and additional successes from triple-Gold Cup winner Best Mate (2002) and Impek (2005), Henrietta Knight is the joint most successful trainer of the Peterborough Chase, winning a total of eight renewals. Nicky Henderson has also trained eight winners, while Captain Tim Forster has trained four.

Desert Orchid, lining-up in the penultimate race of his long career, finished third in the 1991 Peterborough Chase. Ridden by Richard Dunwoody, the 12-year-old veteran finished third to Sabin Du Loir, beaten four lengths.

== Records ==
Most successful horse (4 wins):

- Edredon Bleu – 1998, 1999, 2000, 2001

Leading jockey (4 wins):

- Richard Dunwoody – Very Promising (1987), Remittance Man (1992), Travado (1995), One Man (1997)
- Jim Culloty – Edredon Bleu (1998, 1999, 2000), Best Mate (2002)

Leading trainer (8 wins):

- Nicky Henderson – Remittance Man (1992), Travado (1993, 1995), Riverside Theatre (2013), Josses Hill (2016), Top Notch (2017, 2019), Mister Fisher (2020)
- Henrietta Knight - Edredon Bleu (1998, 1999, 2000, 2001), Best Mate (2002), Impek (2005), Racing Demon (2006, 2007)

== Winners since 1978 ==
Year	Winner	SP	Jockey	Trainer
1978	Purdo	2/7f, 3 ran	Bob Davies	Nick Gaselee
1979	Chumson	100/30, 4 ran	Oliver Sherwood (Note: amateur jockey)	Fred Winter
1980	Border Incident	4/7f, 8 ran	Ron Barry	Richard Head
1981	Wayward Lad	1/4f, 4 ran	Robert Earnshaw	Michael Dickinson
1982	Abandoned due to fog
1983	Wayward Lad	4/11f, 4 ran	Robert Earnshaw	Michael Dickinson
1984	Carved Opal	5/1, 5 ran	John Francome	Fred Winter
1985	The Mighty Mac	6/4, 6 ran	Graham Bradley	Mrs Monica Dickinson
1986	Western Sunset	7/2, 3 ran	Hywel Davies	Tim Forster
1987	Very Promising	2/7f, 3 ran	Richard Dunwoody	David Nicholson
1988	Townley Stone	4/5f, 3 ran	George Mernagh	John Webber
1989	Clever Folly	5/4f, 3 ran	Neale Doughty	Gordon W. Richards
1990	Pegwell Bay	11/10f, 3 ran	Jamie Railton	Tim Forster
1991	Sabin du Loir	4/7f, 4 ran	Peter Scudamore	Martin Pipe
1992	Remittance Man	1/5f, 4 ran	Richard Dunwoody	Nicky Henderson
1993	Travado	8/13f, 4 ran	Jamie Osborne	Nicky Henderson
1994	Martha's Son	2/1, 4 ran	Rodney Farrant	Tim Forster
1995	Travado	5/2, 7 ran	Richard Dunwoody	Nicky Henderson
1996	Dublin Flyer	4/9f, 6 ran	Brendan Powell	Tim Forster
1997	One Man	13/8f, 6 ran	Richard Dunwoody	Gordon W. Richards
1998	Edredon Bleu	5/1, 6 ran	Jim Culloty	Henrietta Knight
1999	Edredon Bleu	11/8f, 4 ran	Jim Culloty	Henrietta Knight
2000	Edredon Bleu	100/30, 5 ran	Jim Culloty	Henrietta Knight
2001	Edredon Bleu	10/11f, 4 ran	Norman Williamson	Henrietta Knight
2002	Best Mate	8/15f, 5 ran	Jim Culloty	Henrietta Knight
2003	Jair du Cochet	100/30, 6 ran	Jacques Ricou	Guillaume Macaire
2004	Le Roi Miguel	15/8f, 8 ran	Ruby Walsh	Paul Nicholls
2005	Impek	5/1, 11 ran	Tony McCoy	Henrietta Knight
2006	Racing Demon	13/8f, 5 ran	Graham Lee	Henrietta Knight
2007	Racing Demon	1/4f, 2 ran	Tony McCoy	Henrietta Knight
2008	Monet's Garden	5/1, 10 ran	Davy Condon	Nicky Richards
2009	Deep Purple	12/1, 7 ran	Paul Moloney	Evan Williams
2010 (Note: The 2010 running took place at Newbury)	Tartak	11/4, 7 ran	Paddy Brennan	Tom George
2011	Gauvain	15/2, 8 ran	Noel Fehily	Nick Williams
2012 (Note: The 2012 running took place at Kempton Park after the original Huntingdon fixture was abandoned due to a frozen track)	Menorah	7/2, 5 ran	Richard Johnson	Philip Hobbs
2013	Riverside Theatre	9/4f, 7 ran	Barry Geraghty	Nicky Henderson
2014	Wishfull Thinking	13/2, 6 ran	Richard Johnson	Philip Hobbs
2015	Al Ferof	9/4, 5 ran	Harry Skelton	Dan Skelton
2016	Josses Hill	7/4F, 5 ran	Noel Fehily	Nicky Henderson
2017 (Note: The 2017 running took place over 2m 5½f at Taunton after the original fixture was abandoned due to snow)	Top Notch	4/9F, 4 ran	Daryl Jacob	Nicky Henderson
2018	Charbel	13/8F, 9 ran	Noel Fehily	Kim Bailey
2019	Top Notch	15/8F, 6 ran	Daryl Jacob	Nicky Henderson
2020 (Note: The 2020 running took place at Cheltenham after the original fixture was abandoned due to flooding)	Mister Fisher	9/2, 8 ran	Nico de Boinville	Nicky Henderson
2021	First Flow	12/1, 6 ran	David Bass	Kim Bailey
2022	Pic D'Orhy	9/4, 7 ran	Harry Cobden	Paul Nicholls
2023	Abandoned due to waterlogging
2024	Djelo	2/1, 5 ran	Charlie Deutsch	Venetia Williams
2025	Djelo	5/6f, 5 ran	Charlie Deutsch	Venetia Williams

== See also ==
- Horse racing in Great Britain
- List of British National Hunt races
