= Richard Burridge =

Richard Burridge may refer to:

- Richard Burridge (screenwriter) (born 1951)
- Richard Burridge (priest) (born 1955)
