= Hurst Park Novices' Chase =

Former horse race in England

The Hurst Park Novices' Chase was a National Hunt novice chase in England. It was run at Ascot over a distance of 2 miles (3,218 metres), and it was scheduled to take place each year in November.

The race was first run in 1965 and was run for the last time in 1999. The race held Grade 2 status from 1990 to 1993. It usually attracted a good quality field but the number of runners was consistently low (averaged less than 5 in last twenty years).

== Winners ==
Year	Winner	Age	Jockey	Trainer
1965	Stalbridge Colonist	6	Bill Rees	Ken Cundell
1966	Sir Thopas	5	Jeff King	Bob Turnell
1967	Get Stepping	6	Jeff King	Bob Turnell
1968	Rehearsed	6	Bill Rees	Bob Turnell
1969	Louis Napoleon	6	Stan Mellor	Frank Cundell
1970	Table Mountain	5	Ken White	Fred Rimell
1971	Shell Streak	4	Bob Champion	S Pattemore
1972	Killiney	6	Richard Pitman	Fred Winter
1973	Cool Million	5	Aly Branford	Fulke Walwyn
1974	Isle of Man	7	Bill Smith	Fulke Walwyn
1975	Hardier	7	Ian Watkinson	Harry Thomson Jones
1976	Supreme Halo	6	Chris Read	Ron Smyth
1977	Pavement Artist	5	Steve Smith Eccles	Harry Thomson Jones
1978	Ramblix	6	John Francome	Fred Winter
1979	Kybo	6	Richard Rowe	Josh Gifford
1980	Little Bay	5	Ron Barry	Gordon W. Richards
1981	Run With Pride	6	Niall Madden	Mick O'Toole (Ir)
1982	Jubilee Medal	5	John Francome	Nicky Henderson
1983	Monza	5	Richard Rowe	Peter Cundell
1984	Townley Stone	5	Graham McCourt	John Webber
1985	Desert Orchid	6	Colin Brown	David Elsworth
1986	Ten of Spades	6	Gareth Charles Jones	Stan Mellor
1987	Barnbrook Again	6	Simon Sherwood	David Elsworth
1988	Fred The Tread	6	Richard Dunwoody	Terry Casey
1989	Young Snugfit	5	Jamie Osborne	Oliver Sherwood
1990	African Safari	6	Robert Stronge	Sue Smith
1991	Poetic Gem	6	Richard Guest	Sue Smith
1992	Sybillin	6	Mark Dwyer	Jimmy FitzGerald
1993	Baydon Star	6	Adrian Maguire	David Nicholson
1994	Leotard	7	Jamie Osborne	Oliver Sherwood
1995	Cumbrian Challenge	6	Lorcan Wyer	Peter Easterby
1996	Oh So Risky	9	Paul Holley	David Elsworth
1997	Chief's Song	7	Richard Dunwoody	Simon Dow
1998	Billingsgate	6	Paul Holley	David Elsworth
1999	Catfish Keith	5	Timmy Murphy	Henrietta Knight
