= Rehearsal Handicap Chase =

Steeplechase horse race in Great Britain

Rehearsal Handicap Chase
2025
Konfusion	Deafening Silence	Docpickedme

Previous years
2024
Frero Banbou	The Changing Man	Marble Sands
2022
L'Homme Presse	Into Overdrive	Happygolucky
2021
Aye Right	Good Boy Bobby	Dingo Dollar

2020-2011
2020
Yorkhill	Whatmore	Cool Mix
2019
Takingrisks	Captain Chaos	Top Ville Ben
2018
Lake View Lad	Captain Chaos	Otago Trail
2017
Beware The Bear	Bishops Road	Yala Enki
2016
Otago Trail	Bristol De Mai	Definitly Red
2015
Wakanda	Virak	The Last Samuri
2014
Hey Big Spender	Lie Forrit	Vintage Star
2013
Hey Big Spender	Vintage Star	Baile Anrai
2012
[[ | Light blue, brown stripe and armlets | 92px]]
Junior	Benny Be Good	Rich Lord
2011
Hey Big Spender	The Hollinwell	Ashfield's Dream

2010-2001
2009
Beat The Boys	Coe	According To John
2002
See More Business	Bindaree	Rugged River
2001
Arctic Camper	Wicked Crack	Moral Support

2000-1991
2000
Moral Support	Jocks Cross	Edmond
1999
Dr Leunt	Go Ballistic	Potentate
1998
See More Business	Dom Samourai	Escartefigue
1997
See More Business	Indian Tracker	Banjo
1996
Belmont King	Trying Again	St Mellion Fairway
1995
Grange Brake	Bradbury Star
1994
Master Oats	Party Politics	Cool Ground
1993
Party Politics	Riverside Boy	Jodami
1992
Run For Free	Miinnehoma	Bonanza Boy
1991
Carvill's Hill	Aquilifer	Katabatic

1990-1987
1990
Boraceva	Bonanza Boy	Yahoo
1989
Bonanza Boy	Run And Skip	The West Awake
1988
Ten Plus	Aquilifer	Golden Minstrel
1987
Western Sunset	Cybrandian

The Rehearsal Handicap Chase is a Premier Handicap National Hunt steeplechase in Great Britain which is open to horses aged four years or older. It is run at Newcastle, over a distance of about 3 miles (2 miles 7 furlongs and 91 yards or 4,727 metres). It is a handicap race, and it is scheduled to take place each year in December.

The race was first run in 1979 at Chepstow, the name indicating that runners should consider it as a "rehearsal" for the Cheltenham Gold Cup. It was initially a Conditions race with Listed status but became a Limited handicap (still with Listed status) in 1988. It was run at Chepstow until 2004 (over the longer distance of 3 miles and 2 furlongs between 2002 and 2004) and during this period was often used as a stepping stone towards the Welsh Grand National which is run at the same course around four weeks later. It was re-classified as a Premier Handicap in 2022 when Listed status was removed from handicap races.

== Winners ==
- Weights given in stones and pounds.

Year	Winner	Age	Weight	Jockey	Trainer
1979	Chumson	9	walked over	Bryan Smart	Fred Winter
1980	Abandoned due to flooding
1981	Straight Jocelyn	9	11-00	John Francome	Roddy Armytage
1982	Bregawn	8	11-00	Graham Bradley	Michael Dickinson
1983	Observe	7	11-04	John Francome	Fred Winter
1984	Tom's Little Al	8	11-00	Peter Scudamore	Willie Williams
1985	Burrough Hill Lad	9	11-12	Phil Tuck	Jenny Pitman
1986	Cybrandian	8	11-00	Peter Scudamore	Peter Easterby
1987	Western Sunset	11	11-04	Hywel Davies	Tim Forster
1988	Ten Plus	8	10-12	Kevin Mooney	Fulke Walwyn
1989	Bonanza Boy	8	11-10	Peter Scudamore	Martin Pipe
1990	Boraceva	7	10-07	Jimmy Frost	Toby Balding
1991	Carvill's Hill	9	11-12	Peter Scudamore	Martin Pipe
1992	Run For Free	8	10-07	Mark Perrett	Martin Pipe
1993	Party Politics	9	10-09	Carl Llewellyn	Nick Gaselee
1994	Master Oats	8	11-04	Norman Williamson	Kim Bailey
1995	Grange Brake	9	10-02	David Walsh	Nigel Twiston-Davies
1996	Belmont King	8	10-08	Tony McCoy	Paul Nicholls
1997	See More Business	7	11-12	Timmy Murphy	Paul Nicholls
1998	See More Business	8	11-12	Joe Tizzard	Paul Nicholls
1999	Dr Leunt	8	10-10	Andrew Thornton	Philip Hobbs
2000	Moral Support	8	10-02	Noel Fehily	Charlie Mann
2001	Arctic Camper	9	10-04	Norman Williamson	Venetia Williams
2002	See More Business	12	11-10	Andrew Thornton	Paul Nicholls
2003	Sir Rembrandt	7	10-05	Andrew Thornton	Robert Alner
2004	One Knight	8	11-09	Paul Flynn	Philip Hobbs
2005	Direct Access	10	10-00	Brian Harding	Nicky Richards
2006	Neptune Collonges	5	11-12	Liam Heard	Paul Nicholls
2007	Harmony Brig	8	10-12	Brian Harding	Nicky Richards
2008	Abandoned due to frost
2009	Beat The Boys	8	10-12	Timmy Murphy	Nigel Twiston-Davies
2010	Abandoned due to snow
2011	Hey Big Spender	8	11-12	Joe Tizzard	Colin Tizzard
2012	Junior	9	11-12	Tom Scudamore	David Pipe
2013	Hey Big Spender	10	11-04	Brendan Powell	Colin Tizzard
2014	Hey Big Spender	11	11-12	Brendan Powell	Colin Tizzard
2015	Wakanda	6	11-04	Danny Cook	Sue Smith
2016	Otago Trail	8	11-03	Liam Treadwell	Venetia Williams
2017	Beware The Bear	7	11-07	Sean Bowen	Nicky Henderson
2018	Lake View Lad	8	10-13	Henry Brooke	N W Alexander
2019	Takingrisks	10	10-13	Sean Quinlan	Nicky Richards
2020	Yorkhill	10	10-10	Ryan Mania	Sandy Thomson
2021	Aye Right	8	11-05	Callum Bewley	Harriet Graham
2022	L'Homme Presse	7	12-00	Charlie Deutsch	Venetia Williams
2023	Abandoned due to waterlogging
2024	Frero Banbou	9	10-04	Ned Fox	Venetia Williams
2025	Konfusion	7	10-02	Callum Bewley	Joel Parkinson & Sue Smith

== See also ==
- Horse racing in Great Britain
- List of British National Hunt races
