= Scilly Isles Novices' Chase =

Steeplechase horse race in Britain

Scilly Isles Novices' Chase
2026
Sixmilebridge	Kala Conti	Miami Magic

Previous years
2025
Handstands	Jango Baie	Mark Of Gold
2024
Nickle Back	Djelo	Colonel Harry
2023
Gerri Colombe	Balco Coastal	Thunder Rock
2022
L'Homme Presse	Mister Coffey	Pic D'Orhy
2021
Sporting John	Shan Blue	Paint The Dream

2020–2011
2020
Itchy Feet	Midnight Shadow	Champagne Platinum
2019
Defi Du Seuil	Lostintranslation	Vinndication
2018
Terrefort	Cyrname	No Comment
2017
Top Notch	Baron Alco	Le Prezien
2016
Bristol De Mai	As De Mee	Tea For Two
2015
Gitane Du Berlais	Irish Saint	Grumeti
2014
Oscar Whisky	Manyriverstocross	Benvolio
2013
Captain Conan	Third Intention	Houblon Des Obeaux
2012
For Non Stop	Micheal Flips	Our Mick
2011
Medermit	Captain Chris	Mr Gardner

2010–2001
2010
Punchestowns	Tchico Polos	Pocket Aces
2009
Herecomesthetruth	Massini's Maguire	Buck The Legend
2008
Silverburn	The Market Man	Wee Robbie
2007
New Little Bric	Aztec Warrior	All Star
2006
Napolitain	Turpin Green	Stance
2005
El Vaquero	Le Passing	Lacdoudal
2004
Patricksnineteenth	L'aventure	One Nation
2003
Tarxien	Farmer Jack	Ground Ball
2002
Golden Goal	Silence Reigns	Bounce Back
2001
Best Mate	Crocadee	Hannigan's Lodger

2000–1991
2000
Upgrade	Young Spartacus	Good Vibes
1999
Hoh Express	No Retreat	Bank Avenue
1998
Jack Doyle	Cyfor Malta	Dr Leunt
1996
Senor El Betrutti	Campeche Bay	Jibber The Kibber
1995
Banjo	High Baron	Tug of Peace
1994
Baydon Star	Crystal Spirit	Bas De Laine
1993
Young Hustler	Dawson City	Fighting Words
1992
Bradbury Star	Carbisdale	Deadly Charm
1991
Tildarg	Calapaez	Dare Say

1990–1988
1989
The Bakewell Boy	Southernair	Majestic Ring
1988
Yeoman Broker	Southernair	Bonanza Boy

The Scilly Isles Novices' Chase is a Grade 1 National Hunt steeplechase in Great Britain, which is open to horses aged five years or older. It is run at Sandown Park over a distance of around two miles and four furlongs (2 miles 4 furlongs 10 yards, or 4,033 metres). During its running there are seventeen fences to be jumped. The race is for novice chasers, and it is scheduled to take place each year in late January or early February. It was sponsored by The Tote in 2011 and run as the Totepool Challengers Novices' Chase, and by Betfair in 2012 and run as the Betfair Novices' Chase. The 2013 running was sponsored by Betfred and run as the Betfred Mobile Lotto Challengers' Novice Chase. The Scilly Isles name was restored to the race title from 2014.

The race was first run in 1964 and takes its name from the Scilly Isles, Surrey, an area near to Sandown Park racecourse.

Prior to 1988 the distance of the race was 2 miles and 18 yards (3,235 metres).

== Records ==
Leading jockey since 1964 (4 wins):

- Barry Geraghty – Punchestowns (2010), Captain Conan (2013), Oscar Whisky (2014), Defi Du Seuil (2019)
- Daryl Jacob – Gitane Du Berlais (2015), Bristol De Mai (2016), Top Notch (2017), Terrefort (2018)

Leading trainer since 1964 (6 wins):

- Nicky Henderson – First Bout (1987), Punchestowns (2010), Captain Conan (2013), Oscar Whisky (2014), Top Notch (2017), Terrefort (2018)

== Winners ==
Year	Winner	Age	Jockey	Trainer
1964	Buona Notte	7	Johnny Haine	Bob Turnell
1965	The Braggart	7	Terry Biddlecombe	Harry Thomson Jones
1966	Abandoned due to waterlogging
1967	Bowgeeno	7	Jeff King	Bob Turnell
1968	Aurelius	10	Stan Mellor	Ken Cundell
1969	Abandoned due to snow
1970	Royal Relief	6	John Cook	Edward Courage
1971	Black Magic	7	Richard Dennard	Peter Cazalet
1972	Potentate	7	Doug Barrott	Josh Gifford
1973	Killiney	7	Richard Pitman	Fred Winter
1974	Even Up	7	Graham Thorner	Mrs D Oughton
1975	Abandoned due to waterlogging
1976	Skryne	6	Ron Barry	Peter Bailey
1977	Flitgrove	6	Jeff King	David Nicholson
1978	Space Project	8	Ron Hyett	R Brown
1979	Abandoned due to frost
1980	Beacon Light	9	Andy Turnell	Bob Turnell
1981	Clayside	7	Alan Brown	Peter Easterby
1982	Sea Image	7	John Francome	Fred Winter
1983	Kilbrittain Castle	7	Bill Smith	Fulke Walwyn
1984	Norton Cross	6	Alan Brown	Peter Easterby
1985	Karenomore	7	Jonjo O'Neill	Peter Easterby
1986	Berlin	7	Dermot Browne	Nick Gaselee
1987	First Bout	6	Steve Smith Eccles	Nicky Henderson
1988	Yeoman Broker	7	Richard Rowe	Josh Gifford
1989	The Bakewell Boy	7	Jimmy Frost	Richard Frost
1990	Abandoned due to waterlogging
1991	Tildarg	7	Jamie Osborne	Oliver Sherwood
1992	Bradbury Star	7	Declan Murphy	Josh Gifford
1993	Young Hustler	6	Carl Llewellyn	Nigel Twiston-Davies
1994	Baydon Star	7	Richard Dunwoody	David Nicholson
1995	Banjo	5	Adrian Maguire	Martin Pipe
1996	Senor El Betrutti	7	Graham Bradley	Susan Nock
1997	Stately Home	6	Norman Williamson	Peter Bowen
1998	Jack Doyle	7	Carl Llewellyn	Nigel Twiston-Davies
1999	Hoh Express	7	Jamie Osborne	Paul Webber
2000	Upgrade	6	Tony McCoy	Martin Pipe
2001	Best Mate	6	Jim Culloty	Henrietta Knight
2002	Golden Goal	6	Norman Williamson	Venetia Williams
2003	Tarxien	9	Tony McCoy	Martin Pipe
2004	Patricksnineteenth	7	Tom Doyle	Paul Webber
2005	El Vaquero	7	Jim Culloty	Henrietta Knight
2006	Napolitain	5	Tony McCoy	Paul Nicholls
2007	New Little Bric	6	Ruby Walsh	Paul Nicholls
2008	Silverburn	7	Sam Thomas	Paul Nicholls
2009	Herecomesthetruth	7	Ruby Walsh	Paul Nicholls
2010	Punchestowns	7	Barry Geraghty	Nicky Henderson
2011	Medermit	7	Robert Thornton	Alan King
2012 (Note: The 2012 running took place at Newbury)	For Non Stop	7	Noel Fehily	Nick Williams
2013	Captain Conan	6	Barry Geraghty	Nicky Henderson
2014	Oscar Whisky	9	Barry Geraghty	Nicky Henderson
2015	Gitane Du Berlais	5	Daryl Jacob	Willie Mullins
2016	Bristol De Mai	5	Daryl Jacob	Nigel Twiston-Davies
2017	Top Notch	6	Daryl Jacob	Nicky Henderson
2018	Terrefort	5	Daryl Jacob	Nicky Henderson
2019	Defi Du Seuil	6	Barry Geraghty	Philip Hobbs
2020	Itchy Feet	6	Gavin Sheehan	Olly Murphy
2021	Sporting John	6	Richard Johnson	Philip Hobbs
2022	L'Homme Presse	7	Charlie Deutsch	Venetia Williams
2023	Gerri Colombe	7	Jordan Gainford	Gordon Elliott
2024	Nickle Back	8	James Best	Sarah Humphrey
2025	Handstands	6	Ben Jones	Ben Pauling
2026	Sixmilebridge	7	Kielan Woods	Fergal O'Brien

== See also ==
- Horse racing in Great Britain
- List of British National Hunt races
