= Charlie Deutsch =

British National Hunt jockey

Personal information
- Born: Great Britain
- Occupation: Jockey

Horse racing career
- Sport: Horse racing
- Career wins: 346 ^{(16 February 2025)}

Major racing wins
- Scilly Isles Novices' Chase; Brown Advisory Novices' Chase; Betfair Chase

Significant horses
- L'Homme Presse; Royale Pagaille

Charlie Deutsch is a multiple Grade I winning British National Hunt jockey. In 2018, he was sentenced to 10 months imprisonment for dangerous driving.

== Racing career ==
Deutsch began his racing career with Charlie Longsdon in 2013 before moving across to Venetia Williams in Herefordshire. He fell in his first ride for Williams. Deutsch won the Grade 3 Betfair Handicap Chase at Cheltenham with Aachen in 2015. He would win the race again in 2021 with Commodore making him joint leading jockey in the race. In 2016, Deutsch won the Lanzarote Hurdle at Kempton Park with Yala Enki. The jockey stated it as his biggest win at the time.

Deutsch was arrested in 2018 for drink driving. At this point of his career, he had won 88 races.

His first ride after release from prison was Rogue Dancer at Huntingdon Racecourse on 16 October 2018. He finished 2nd. At the 2019 Cheltenham Festival, Deutsch nearly won his first Festival race in the Ryanair Chase with Aso, finishing second to Frodon. At the 2019 November meeting at Cheltenham he won the Leading Jockey award sponsored by Ariat.

Deutsch built a solid partnership with L'Homme Presse, winning a number of Grade 2 Races. He would go on to win two Grade 1 races - The Scilly Isles Novices Chase, and the Brown Advisory Novices Chase which would be his first Cheltenham Festival winner.

Deutsch won the 2023 Betfair Chase with Royale Pagaille. He also partnered Victtorino to two big race victories at Ascot in the Sodexo Live! Gold Cup and Ascot Silver Cup, with the horse running in the silks of triple-crown winner Secretariat. Djelo was another key horse for Deutsch in 2023, notably winning the grade two Noel Novices' Chase.

Deutsch would repeat his success with Royal Pagaille, successfully defending the 2024 Betfair Chase.

== Major wins ==
(United Kingdom) Great Britain

- Brown Advisory Novices Chase - (1) - L'Homme Presse (2022)
- Scilly Isles Novices' Chase - (1) - L'Homme Presse (2022)
- Betfair Chase - (2) - Royale Pagaille (2023, 2024)

== Cheltenham Festival winners (2) ==
- Brown Advisory Novices Chase - L'Homme Presse (2022)
- Johnny Henderson Grand Annual Chase - Martator (2026)

== Personal life ==
Deutsch is based in Tewkesbury and in his youth was a keen huntsman with Heythrop. He was also a member of the Pony Club. Since 2017, Deutsch has been sponsored by equine insurer Lycetts.

=== Criminal conviction ===
On 30 March 2018, Deutsch was arrested following a five-mile police chase in his Audi A4, after being initially stopped for speeding and possible driving under the influence of alcohol. During the chase, he reached speeds over 110 mph. He evaded police but was caught using a police stinger. In May 2018, he pleaded guilty to dangerous driving while over the legal alcohol limit and escaping from police custody. He was sentenced to ten months in prison. He served two and a half months of his sentence at HM Prison Bristol before being released.
