= Terry Biddlecombe =

English National Hunt racing jockey

Personal information
- Born: 2 February 1941
- Died: 5 January 2014 (aged 72)
- Occupation: Jockey

Horse racing career
- Sport: Horse racing
- Career wins: 905

Major racing wins
- Cheltenham Gold Cup; Champion Hurdle; Welsh Grand National; Triumph Hurdle; Mackeson Gold Cup; Irish Sweeps Hurdle

Significant horses
- Woodland Venture; Comedy of Errors (horse); Gay Trip; Best Mate

Terry Biddlecombe (2 February 1941 – 5 January 2014) was an English National Hunt racing jockey in the 1960s and 1970s. He was Champion Jockey in 1965, 1966 and 1969.

Biddlecombe was born in Hartpury, Gloucester on 2 February 1941. He rode 114 winners in the 1964/1965 season, and followed that with 102 the next season. In 1968/1969, he rode 77 winners, which saw him tied with Bob Davies. One of his finest moments came in the 1967 Cheltenham Gold Cup, when he rode the 100-8 horse Woodland Venture to victory. In 1972 he finished second in the Grand National on Gay Trip. Between 1972 and 1974, he rode many times for Queen Elizabeth The Queen Mother, a well-known supporter of horse racing. In April 1974 he appeared on the television programme This Is Your Life, and finally retired from competitive racing having posted more than 900 winners.

== Early life ==
His father Walter was a successful point to point jockey and farmer. His mother, Nancy was a horsewoman. His elder brother Tony, also a successful amateur jockey until he gave up racing to take over the family farm was born on 6 November 1938 and his sister Sue was born in May 1948.

Brother Tony was National Hunt amateur champion jockey in 1961/2 and his cousin, Peter Jones was also a jockey.

== Career ==
On 23 February 1957 Biddlecombe was unplaced on first ride on Balkan Flower at Wincanton and rode his first winner, Burnella, at the same course on 6 March 1958 beating Fred Winter in a photo finish.

In February 1960 Biddlecombe turned professional. Shortly after he had his first ride in the Grand National on Aliform where he fell at the 22nd fence (Becher's Brook). Biddlecombe had his first ride for Fred Rimell in 1961, and on 28 January 1962 rode his first winner for him on Voleur. He was retained as his second jockey (behind Bobby Beasley) for the 1962/3 season and was retained as first jockey for the 1963/4 season.

On 27 February 1970, Biddlecombe suffered a life-threatening fall on King's Dream at Kempton Park where he ruptured a kidney and broke 3 ribs. He returned to race riding on 29 April 1970 but missed the winning ride on Gay Trip in the Grand National, a horse he was to ride in the next 2 Grand Nationals, falling at the 1st fence in 1971 and finishing 2nd in 1972.

Due to increasing weight concerns, Fred Rimell replaced Biddlecombe with Bill Smith as stable jockey for the 1972/3 season. Biddlecombe continued as a freelance jockey, riding some Rimell horses and many horses for Fulke Walwyn and Ryan Price.

On 14 March 1974, he retired from riding after finishing 3rd on Game Spirit in the Gold Cup and unplaced on Amarind in the final race of the day.

Biddlecombe was National Hunt champion jockey on 3 occasions. 1965 with a season's career best 114 wins, 1966 (102 wins) and 1969 (77 wins) when he tied with Bob Davies, his future brother in law.

Biddlecombe retired with 905 British winners - at the time, the only National Hunt jockey to have ridden more was Stan Mellor - and reputedly at least 47 broken bones.

Biddlecombe was a regular for the Jockeys Cricket XI, usually keeping wicket.

With a large frame, he was 5 foot 11 tall, he fought a constant battle with his weight and increasingly with alcohol.

== Personal life ==
On 26 July 1968, Biddlecombe married Bridget Tyrwhitt-Drake. They had two daughters, Laura (born 10 December 1972) and Elizabeth (born 26 April 1974).

On retirement, Biddlecombe applied for a permit to train, but was refused by the Jockey Club as his wife already ran a livery yard from the premises.

He had spells as a BBC Sport paddock commentator and racing correspondent for Midlands ATV. It was whilst doing a feature that he first met Henrietta Knight.

In 1981, he married Ann Hodgson, they had three children, including Robert, a successful jockey. They emigrated to Australia in 1985 and a farm outside Perth where alcoholism eventually led to the end of the marriage.

In 1992 Biddlecombe returned to England and with the help of the Injured Jockeys Fund, dried out. A few months later he met Henrietta Knight again. They married in 1995.

== Later life ==
Biddlecombe married the trainer Henrietta Knight in 1995, having given her the ultimatum "It's the bottle or me".

Together with his wife, held open days at their stables, with many coming to see the 3 x Cheltenham Gold Cup winner Best Mate, who was ridden to victory by Jim Culloty in 3 consecutive Gold cups in 2002, 2003 & 2004 . Another of their star horses, Edredon Bleu won the 2003 King George VI Chase at Kempton Park Racecourse.

In the early 1980s, Terry worked with the actor John Hurt for his role in the 1983 film Champions, the biopic of jockey Bob Champion. Terry was followed into the racing game by his son, from his second marriage, Robert.

He had remained involved in horse racing until his death on 5 January 2014 following a long illness.
