= L'Homme Presse (horse) =

French-bred Thoroughbred racehorse

L'Homme Pressé
- Racing silks of DFA Racing
- Sire: Diamond Boy
- Dam: Romance Turgot
- Damsire: Bateau Rouge
- Sex: Gelding
- Foaled: 7 April 2015
- Country: France
- Colour: Bay
- Breeder: Bernard Camp
- Owner: DFA Racing
- Trainer: Venetia Williams
- Record: 11:7-1-1
- Earnings: £267,032

Major wins
- Brown Advisory Novices' Chase (2022); Scilly Isles Novices' Chase (2022); Dipper Novices' Chase (2022); Rehearsal Handicap Chase (2022)

L'Homme Pressé (foaled 7 April 2015) is a French thoroughbred racehorse competing in National Hunt racing.

== Career ==
L'Homme Pressé was bred in France by Bernard Camp. The horse's name means "The Man in a Hurry". Initially owned by Pegasus Farms Ltd, L'Homme Pressé had two unsuccessful races at Fontainebleau for trainer M Seror and jockey Ludovic Philipperon.

On 14 January, 2021 training was switched to the UK with Venetia Williams. Andrew Edwards was the new owner of L'Homme Pressé. His first race in the UK was at Chepstow in a novices' hurdle which he won by 28 lengths. A re-appearance at Sandown Park 14 days later only yielded a sixth-place finish. Both times he was ridden by amateur jockey Lucy Turner.

In November, ownership transitioned to DFA Racing and after a 223-day break L'Homme Pressé re-appeared at Exeter Racecourse winning on his chase debut. This would mark the first of 5 wins in a row for L'Homme Pressé and new jockey, Charlie Deutsch.

In January, L'Homme Pressé won The Dipper Novices' Chase, his first Grade win. A month later, he won the Scilly Isles Novices' Chase at Sandown Park and then returned to Cheltenham to take victory in the Grade 1 Brown Advisory Novices' Chase. This delivered jockey Deutsch his first Cheltenham Festival winner.

A tilt at the Mildmay Novices' Chase at Aintree in April was ultimately unsuccessful, with L'Homme Pressé finishing third of four runners. The horse renewed with success at Newcastle on 26 November 26 2022. In the King George VI Chase at Kempton Park on Boxing Day, L'Homme Pressé was in a battle for victory with Bravemansgame ultimately unseating rider Charlie Deutsch at the final fence.
