= Brampton Racecourse =

UK Site of Special Scientific Interest

Coordinates: 52.335°N 0.236°W

- Site of Special Scientific Interest
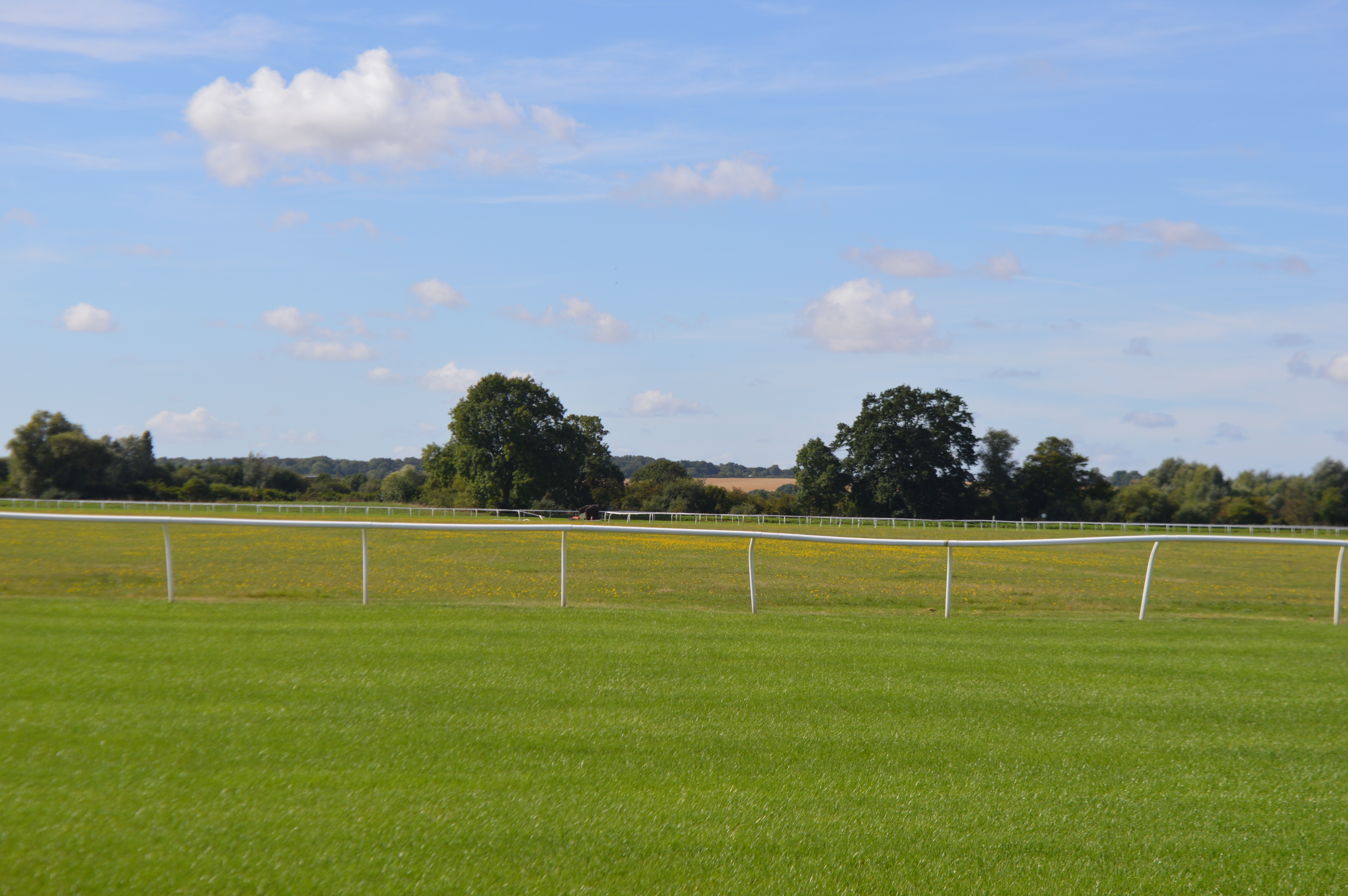
- Location of Brampton Racecourse.
- Area of search: Cambridgeshire
- Grid reference: TL 203 722
- Interest: Biological
- Area: 21.1 hectares
- Notification date: 1984
- Location map: Magic Map

Brampton Racecourse is a 21.1-hectare (52-acre) biological Site of Special Scientific Interest north of Brampton in Cambridgeshire. The site is also a horse racing venue called Huntingdon Racecourse.

The site is species-rich neutral grassland, a rare habitat in the county, in the flood plain of Alconbury Brook. Plants include salad burnet, pepper-saxifrage, and the largest population in of green-winged orchid in Cambridgeshire.
