= Johnny Henderson Grand Annual Chase =

Steeplechase horse race in Britain

- Class: Premier Handicap
- Location: Cheltenham Racecourse; Cheltenham, England
- Inaugurated: 1834
- Race type: Chase
- Website: Cheltenham

Race information
- Distance: 1m 7f 99y (3,499 metres)
- Surface: Turf
- Track: Left-handed
- Qualification: Five-years-old and up
- Weight: Handicap
- Purse: £150,000 (2025); 1st: £84,405

Grand Annual Chase
2026
Martator	Jazzy Matty	Break My Soul

Previous years
2025
Jazzy Matty	Unexpected Party	Midnight It Is
2024
Unexpected Party	Libberty Hunter	Path D'oroux
2023
Maskada	Dinoblue	Global Citizen
2022
Global Citizen	Andy Dufresne	Frero Banbou
2021
Sky Pirate	Entoucas	Ibleo

2020-2011
2020
Chosen Mate	Eclair De Beaufeu	Us And Them
2019
Croco Bay	Bun Doran	Brelan D'As
2018
Le Prezien	Gino Trail	Top Gamble
2017
Rock The World	Gardefort	Theinval
2016
Solar Impulse	Dandridge	Rock The World
2015
Next Sensation	Eastlake	Croco Bay
2014
Savello	Ned Buntline	Claret Cloak
2013
Alderwood	Kid Cassidy	Oiseau de Nuit
2012
Bellvano	Tanks For That	Kumbeshwar
2011
Oiseau de Nuit	Askthemaster	Leo's Lucky Star

2010-2001
2010
Pigeon Island	French Opera	Consigliere
2009
Oh Crick	Moon Over Miami	French Opera
2008
Tiger Cry	My Petra	Calatagan
2007
Andreas	Hasty Prince	Ground Ball
2006
Greenhope	Tiger Cry	Madison Du Berlais
2005
Fota Island	Bambi De L'orme	Caracciola
2004
St Pirran	Ground Ball	Reiziger
2003
Palarshan	Risk Accessor	Dark'n Sharp
2002
Fadoudal Du Cochet	Exit Swinger	Dark'n Sharp

2000-1991
2000
Samakaan	Green Green Desert	Aghawadda Gold
1999
Space Trucker	Dines	Hurricane Lamp
1998
Edredon Bleu	Tidebrook	Cumbrian Challenge
1997
Uncle Ernie	Elzoba	Perknapp
1996
Kibreet	Easthorpe	Uncle Ernie
1995
Sound Reveille	Auburn Castle	Around The Horn
1994
Snitton Lane	Uncle Ernie	Storm Alert
1993
Space Fair	Shamana	Storm Alert
1992
My Young Man	Whatever You Like	Wide Boy
1991
Aldino	Star's Delight	Another Coral

1990-1988
1990
Katabatic	Tresidder	Gold Options
1989
Pukka Major	Clay Hill	Ida's Delight
1988
Vodkatini	Clay Hill	Mr Key

The Johnny Henderson Grand Annual Chase is a Premier Handicap National Hunt steeplechase in Great Britain which is open to horses aged five years or older. It is run on the Old Course at Cheltenham over a distance of about 2 miles (1 mile 7 furlongs and 199 yards, or 3,199 metres), and during its running there are fourteen fences to be jumped. It is a handicap race, and it is scheduled to take place each year during the Cheltenham Festival in March.

== History ==
The Grand Annual is the oldest race at the Festival, and it is also the oldest chase in the present National Hunt calendar. It was first run in April 1834, and it was initially contested over three miles of open country at Andoversford, near Cheltenham. The race was discontinued in the 1860s, but it was revived at the turn of the century. During the early 1900s it took place at several different venues, including Melton Mowbray, Leicester and Warwick. It returned to Cheltenham in 1913.

The name of Johnny Henderson (1920–2003), a banker and racehorse owner, was added to the race's title in 2005. Henderson, the father of trainer Nicky, realized in the early 1960s that the racecourse at Cheltenham was attracting the interest of property developers. To safeguard its future, and that of the Festival, Henderson and other Jockey Club members formed the Racecourse Holdings Trust, and raised £240,000 to purchase the venue.

The running order of the races at the Cheltenham Festival was altered slightly in 2009, and the Johnny Henderson Grand Annual Chase became the last event on the final day. A further change for the 2019 meeting moved the race to become the penultimate race on the final day, switching places with the Martin Pipe Conditional Jockeys' Handicap Hurdle. The maximum number of runners in the race was reduced from 24 to 20 from the 2019 running after a British Horseracing Authority (BHA) review into fatalities at the Cheltenham Festival; the 2018 running of the Grand Annual had seen three horses suffer fatal injuries. In 2021 another change in the Festival running order saw the Grand Annual moved to the second day of the meeting and therefore switch from Cheltenham's New Course to the Old Course. The race held Grade 3 status until 2022 and was re-classified as a Premier Handicap from the 2023 running when Grade 3 status was renamed by the BHA.

== Records ==
Most successful horse since 1946 (2 wins):

- Top Twenty – 1958, 1959
- Dulwich – 1974, 1976

Leading jockey since 1946 (4 wins):

- Graham Bradley – Pearlyman (1986), My Young Man (1992), Sound Reveille (1995), Uncle Ernie (1997)

Leading trainer since 1946 (4 wins):

- Paul Nicholls – St Pirran (2004), Andreas (2007), Solar Impulse (2016), Le Prezien (2018)

== Winners since 1946 ==
- Weights given in stones and pounds.

Year	Winner	Age	Weight	Jockey	Trainer
1946	Loyal King	6	11–12	Dan Moore	Fulke Walwyn
1947	Rope Trick	6	10-08	Tony Doyle	Verly Bewicke
1948	Clare Man	7	10-03	Charlie Hook	Walter Nightingall
	no race 1949 (Note: The race was cancelled in 1949 due to frost, and in 1955 due to snow)
1950	Norborne	6	11-04	Eddie Reavey	Geoffrey Champneys
1951	Merry Court	6	10–11	Tim Molony	Tom Yates
1952	Marcianus	6	11-02	Tim Molony	George Beeby
1953	Rose & Crown	6	10-00	Johnny Bullock	Fulke Walwyn
1954	Hipparchus	5	10-01	Jack Dowdeswell	Peter Rice-Stringer
	no race 1955
1956	Rosenkavalier	7	10-06	Harry Sprague	Bob Turnell
1957	Sir Edmund	7	10–12	Bert Morrow	Alec Kilpatrick
1958	Top Twenty	9	10-07	Francis Shortt	Clem Magnier
1959	Top Twenty	10	12-06	Fred Winter	Clem Magnier
1960	Monsieur Trois Etoiles	8	11-06	Frankie Carroll	Jimmy Brogan
1961	Barberyn	6	11-00	Michael Scudamore	Willie Stephenson
1962	Moretons	9	10–12	Bill Rees	Peter Cazalet
1963	Anner Loch	8	10-06	David Nicholson	John Hicks
1964	Richard of Bordeaux	9	11-03	Willie Robinson	Fulke Walwyn
1965	Fort Rouge	7	11-00	George Milburn	Ken Oliver
1966	Well Packed	8	10–11	Tommy Stack	Bobby Renton
1967	San Angelo	7	11-01	John Buckingham	Edward Courage
1968	Hal's Farewell	7	10-10	Jeff King	Peter Bailey
1969	All Glory	8	10-00	Anthony Robinson (Note: amateur jockey)	John Edwards
1970	Fortina's Palace	7	11-11	Peter Jones	Michael Scudamore
1971	Khan	7	10-08	Frankie Carroll	Mick Burke
1972	Tudor Dance	6	10-02	Jeff King	Bob Turnell
1973	Coolera Prince	8	10-10	Nigel Wakley	Tim Handel
1974	Dulwich	7	10-01	Taffy Salaman	Colin Davies
	no race 1975 (Note: It was abandoned in 1975 due to waterlogging)
1976	Dulwich	9	11-07	Bob Davies	Colin Davies
1977	Tom Morgan	8	11-06	Tommy Stack	Ken Oliver
1978	Young Arthur	9	11-04	Allen Webb	Derek Kent
1979	Casbah	12	11–13	Graham Thorner	Tim Forster
1980	Stopped	8	11–12	Ben de Haan	Fred Winter
1981	Friendly Alliance	8	10-07	John Francome	Fred Winter
1982	Reldis	8	10-00	Paul Barton	David Gandolfo
1983	Churchfield Boy	7	10-00	Joe Byrne	Michael Cunningham
1984	Mossy Moore	8	10-00	Jonjo O'Neill	Brian Chinn
1985	Kathies Lad	8	11-10	Steve Smith Eccles	Alan Jarvis
1986	Pearlyman	7	11-05	Graham Bradley	John Edwards
1987	French Union	9	11-03	Richard Dunwoody	David Nicholson
1988	Vodkatini	9	10–13	Richard Rowe	Josh Gifford
1989	Pukka Major	8	10-02	Peter Scudamore	Tim Thomson Jones
1990	Katabatic	7	10-08	Hywel Davies	Andrew Turnell
1991	Aldino	8	10-00	Jamie Osborne	Oliver Sherwood
1992	My Young Man	7	11-10	Graham Bradley	Charlie Brooks
1993	Space Fair	10	11-01	Adrian Maguire	Richard Lee
1994	Snitton Lane	8	10-00	David Bridgwater	William Clay
1995	Sound Reveille	7	10-10	Graham Bradley	Charlie Brooks
1996	Kibreet	9	10–12	Tony McCoy	Philip Hobbs
1997	Uncle Ernie	12	11-04	Graham Bradley	Jimmy FitzGerald
1998	Edredon Bleu	6	11-06	Tony McCoy	Henrietta Knight
1999	Space Trucker	8	10-01	Shay Barry	Jessica Harrington
2000	Samakaan	7	10–11	Norman Williamson	Venetia Williams
	no race 2001 (Note: The 2001 running was cancelled because of a foot-and-mouth crisis)
2002	Fadoudal du Cochet	9	10-00	David Casey	Arthur Moore
2003	Palarshan	5	10-00	Mark Bradburne	Henry Daly
2004	St Pirran	9	10-01	Ruby Walsh	Paul Nicholls
2005	Fota Island	9	10-00	Paul Carberry	Mouse Morris
2006	Greenhope	8	10–11	Andrew Tinkler	Nicky Henderson
2007	Andreas	7	10–11	Robert Thornton	Paul Nicholls
2008	Tiger Cry	10	10-06	Davy Russell	Arthur Moore
2009	Oh Crick	6	10-00	Wayne Hutchinson	Alan King
2010	Pigeon Island	7	10-01	Paddy Brennan	Nigel Twiston-Davies
2011	Oiseau de Nuit	9	10–13	Steven Clements	Colin Tizzard
2012	Bellvano	8	10-02	Paul Carberry	Nicky Henderson
2013	Alderwood	9	10–11	Tony McCoy	Thomas Mullins
2014	Savello	8	11-05	Davy Russell	Tony Martin
2015	Next Sensation	8	11-02	Tom Scudamore	Michael Scudamore, Jr.
2016	Solar Impulse	6	11-00	Sam Twiston-Davies	Paul Nicholls
2017	Rock the World	9	11-05	Robbie Power	Jessica Harrington
2018	Le Prezien	7	11-08	Barry Geraghty	Paul Nicholls
2019	Croco Bay	12	10-12	Kielan Woods	Ben Case
2020	Chosen Mate	7	11-04	Davy Russell	Gordon Elliott
2021	Sky Pirate	8	11-06	Nick Scholfield	Jonjo O'Neill
2022	Global Citizen	10	10-06	Kielan Woods	Ben Pauling
2023	Maskada	7	11-01	Darragh O'Keeffe	Henry De Bromhead
2024	Unexpected Party	9	10-10	Harry Skelton	Dan Skelton
2025	Jazzy Matty	6	10-07	Danny Gilligan	Cian Collins
2026	Martator	9	10–12	Charlie Deutsch	Venetia Williams

== See also ==
- Horse racing in Great Britain
- List of British National Hunt races
- Recurring sporting events established in 1834 – this race is included under its former title, Grand Annual Chase.
