= Desert Orchid =

British-bred Thoroughbred racehorse (1979–2006)

- Sire: Grey Mirage
- Grandsire: Double-U-Jay
- Dam: Flower Child
- Damsire: Brother
- Sex: Gelding
- Foaled: 11 April 1979 in Goadby, Leicestershire, England.
- Died: 13 November 2006
- Country: Great Britain
- Colour: Grey
- Breeder: James Burridge
- Owner: James Burridge, Midge Burridge, Richard Burridge, Simon Bullimore
- Trainer: David Elsworth at Whitsbury Manor Racing Stables, Fordingbridge, Wiltshire
- Record: 70: 34-11-8
- Earnings: £654,066

Major wins
- Tolworth Hurdle (1984); Kingwell Hurdle (1984); Hurst Park Novices' Chase (1985); King George VI Chase (1986, 1988, 1989, 1990); Gainsborough Chase (1987, 1989, 1991); Martell Cup (1988); Whitbread Gold Cup (1988); Tingle Creek Chase (1988); Victor Chandler Chase (1989); Cheltenham Gold Cup (1989); Racing Post Chase (1990); Irish Grand National (1990)

Awards
- Timeform rating: 187

Honours
- The Desert Orchid Chase at Wincanton; Desert Orchid Chase at Kempton Park Racecourse; Statue, ashes, headstone – Kempton Park Racecourse

Desert Orchid (11 April 1979 – 13 November 2006), known as Dessie, was an English racehorse. The grey achieved a revered and esteemed status within National Hunt racing, where he was much loved by supporters for his front-running attacking style, iron will and extreme versatility. He was rated the fifth-best National Hunt horse of all time by Timeform. During his racing career he was partnered by five different jump jockeys including Colin Brown and Richard Dunwoody.

== Early career ==
Desert Orchid's first race occurred in 1983 and during his early career his regular rider was Colin Brown, who partnered him 42 times in all, winning 17. He fell heavily at the last in a Kempton novice hurdle and took such a long time to get to his feet that it seemed his first race might be his last. Desert Orchid had a successful novice hurdle career in the 1983–84 season winning several races in a row including the Kingwell Pattern Hurdle, a long established Champion Hurdle trial, at Wincanton.

1983/84 - In the Champion Hurdle, Desert Orchid made much of the running, alongside favourite (and winner) Dawn Run, before weakening from the second last, ultimately finishing well beaten.

1984/85 - David Elsworth's grey was no longer eligible for novice hurdles and struggled to recapture his early form. He won one of his eight starts this season, in February at Sandown Park. He was pulled up in the Champion Hurdle at Cheltenham Racecourse, the Welsh Champion Hurdle, and on his final outing of the season fell at Ascot.

== Steeplechase career ==
1985/86 - Desert Orchid was then switched to steeplechasing, still partnered by his regular hurdles jockey Colin Brown, and ran up a sequence of four wins in a row at Devon and Exeter, Sandown and Ascot (twice) before unseating at He did not win again that season in his next 4 races, before winning the 2 mile Killiney Novices' Chase at Ascot.

On his return to Kempton Park for the King George VI Chase, he ran out a 15 length winner over Door Latch, easily defeating former stars such as Wayward Lad, Forgive n'Forget, Combs Ditch and Bolands Cross. The quality of the field can be indicated by Desert Orchid's starting price of 16/1, though the price was also influenced by fears that this speedy front runner would not stay the 3 mile trip, having previously been established as a two miler.

Desert Orchid followed up with wins at Sandown and Wincanton, before finishing third in the Queen Mother Champion Chase at Cheltenham, three lengths behind Pearlyman. He returned to win over 2 1/2 miles at Ascot before being pulled up in the Whitbread Gold Cup on his final outing of the 1986–87 season.

A string of places followed in 1987, second at Sandown (2 miles), second in the King George, and places at Sandown, Wincanton and Cheltenham. Desert Orchid got his head in front on his last two starts of the 1987–88 season taking the Martell Cup at Aintree, which was his first win on a left-handed track, and the Whitbread Gold Cup at Sandown.

One of Desert Orchid's greatest efforts took place in the 1989 Victor Chandler Handicap Chase, where he took on four rivals, including the top-class Panto Prince and Vodkatini, who fell badly on the back straight. Desert Orchid just got back up after being headed to beat Panto Prince by a head.

Desert Orchid was then stepped up to 3 miles and 2 furlongs (5.23 km) for the Cheltenham Gold Cup. The rain and snow which had fallen relentlessly at Cheltenham made the racecourse going heavy. These were conditions hardly suited to Desert Orchid, especially at this left-handed course which he never particularly favoured.

A crowd of over 58,000 witnessed Desert Orchid's effort to overhaul the mud-loving Yahoo in the final stages of the race.

After eight consecutive wins, Desert Orchid then fell in the Martell Cup, (which was won by the Gold Cup runner-up, Yahoo). Jockey, Simon Sherwood, rode Desert Orchid in all nine of these races.

At the start of the 1989-90 season, Desert Orchid again won at Wincanton, this time with a new jockey, Richard Dunwoody. After a second in the Tingle Creek Chase, he headed for Kempton, where he took his third King George, this time as the 4/6 favourite. He followed up with a win at Wincanton and then took the Racing Post Chase at Kempton. The Racing Post Chase of that year included many top-class handicappers and graded horses but Desert Orchid, carrying the huge weight of 12 stone & 3 pounds (77.6 kg), beat the opposition, led by the top-class Delius – a feat the official handicapper said could not be done on ratings. A third in the Cheltenham Gold Cup preceded Desert Orchid's convincing win in the Irish Grand National at Fairyhouse. He was given top weight of 12 stone (76.2 kg), but was even money favourite and won by twelve lengths.

Also in 1989, Desert Orchid was painted by the noted equine artist Barrie Linklater.

Desert Orchid did not reappear until November 1990, finishing second in the Haldon Gold Cup. A fourth in the Tingle Creek followed before the King George VI Chase, which he won for the fourth time.

Desert Orchid had three more races in the 1990–91 season, his last ever victory coming in the Agfa Diamond Chase at Sandown on 2 February 1991. His final start of the season was a 15-length third to Garrison Savannah in the Cheltenham Gold Cup.

In his last season, he was beaten in his first outing at Wincanton, the race he had made his own and which now bears his name. He finished third in the Peterborough Chase at Huntingdon before falling in his last race, the 1991 King George at Kempton, where he was attempting his fifth win.

His record at right-handed tracks such as Kempton was always substantially better than his record at left-handed tracks such as Cheltenham. He had a tendency to jump to his right especially when tired. This meant that at tracks such as Cheltenham he would lose lengths by drifting to the outside. This tendency can be seen by his runs in the 1987 and 1988 Queen Mother Champion Chase and 1989 and 1990 Cheltenham Gold Cup. On each occasion he entered the home straight wide of his rivals. He only raced left-handed on thirteen occasions. However, all were either early in his career or in top-class races. He raced more times at both Sandown (19) and Ascot (15) than he did left-handed.

His part-owner Richard Burridge has stated that it was for this reason that Desert Orchid would have struggled in the Grand National: connections felt he could do himself serious injury at the ninety-degree Canal Turn especially on the second circuit (ref. Richard Burridge: The Grey Horse: The True Story of Desert Orchid).

Desert Orchid won 34 of his 71 starts, amassing £654,066 in prize money.

== Retirement ==
Desert Orchid retired in December 1991 and survived a life-threatening operation for colic a year later.

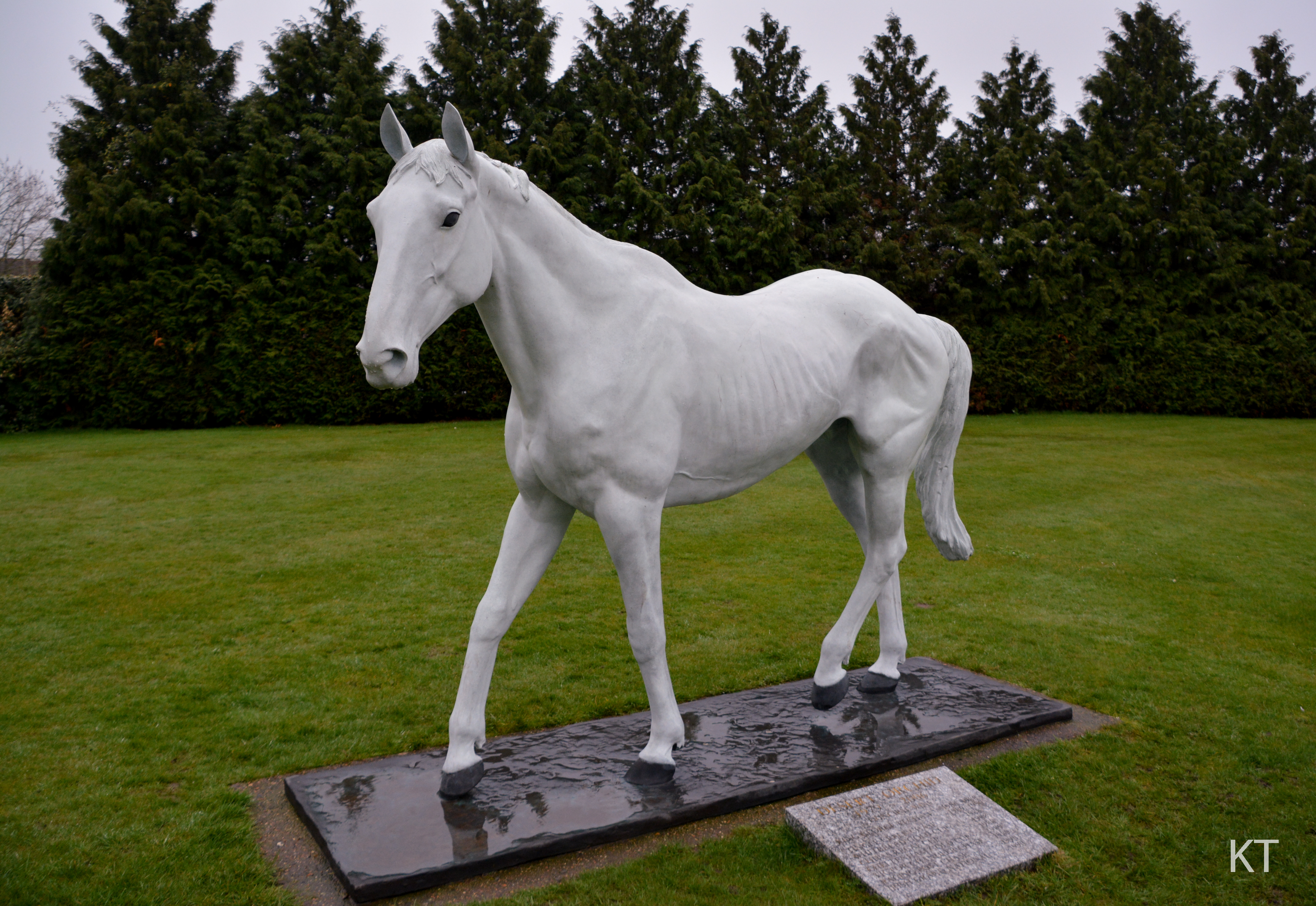
Desert Orchid statue, Kempton Park racecourse 2018

Desert Orchid was no longer ridden due to his age, and David announced that his appearances would be fewer, and nearer to home, as he was now such a senior citizen. Desert Orchid's last public appearance was on 1 October 2006 at his fan club open day, which was held at the National Stud in conjunction with stallion parades.

It was clear that Desert Orchid was now frail. In the week of 6 November 2006, he began to have trouble with coordination and those close to him were summoned to say goodbye. A vet was on standby should his assistance be needed. Last seen by those who loved him best at Egerton, he was lying down but nibbling his hay. One hour later at 6:05 am, Monday 13 November, Desert Orchid died.

Desert Orchid's ashes were buried in a private ceremony at Kempton Park Racecourse near his statue the week prior to the King George. The inaugural running of the Desert Orchid Chase on the 27th was preceded by the unveiling of the headstone for his grave, videos of his finest hours at the track, and a moment's silence in his honour. The race was won by Voy Por Ustedes.

== See also ==
- List of racehorses
- Repeat winners of horse races
