= Huntingdon Racecourse =

Horse racing venue in Cambridgeshire, England

Coordinates: 52°20′03″N 0°14′01″W

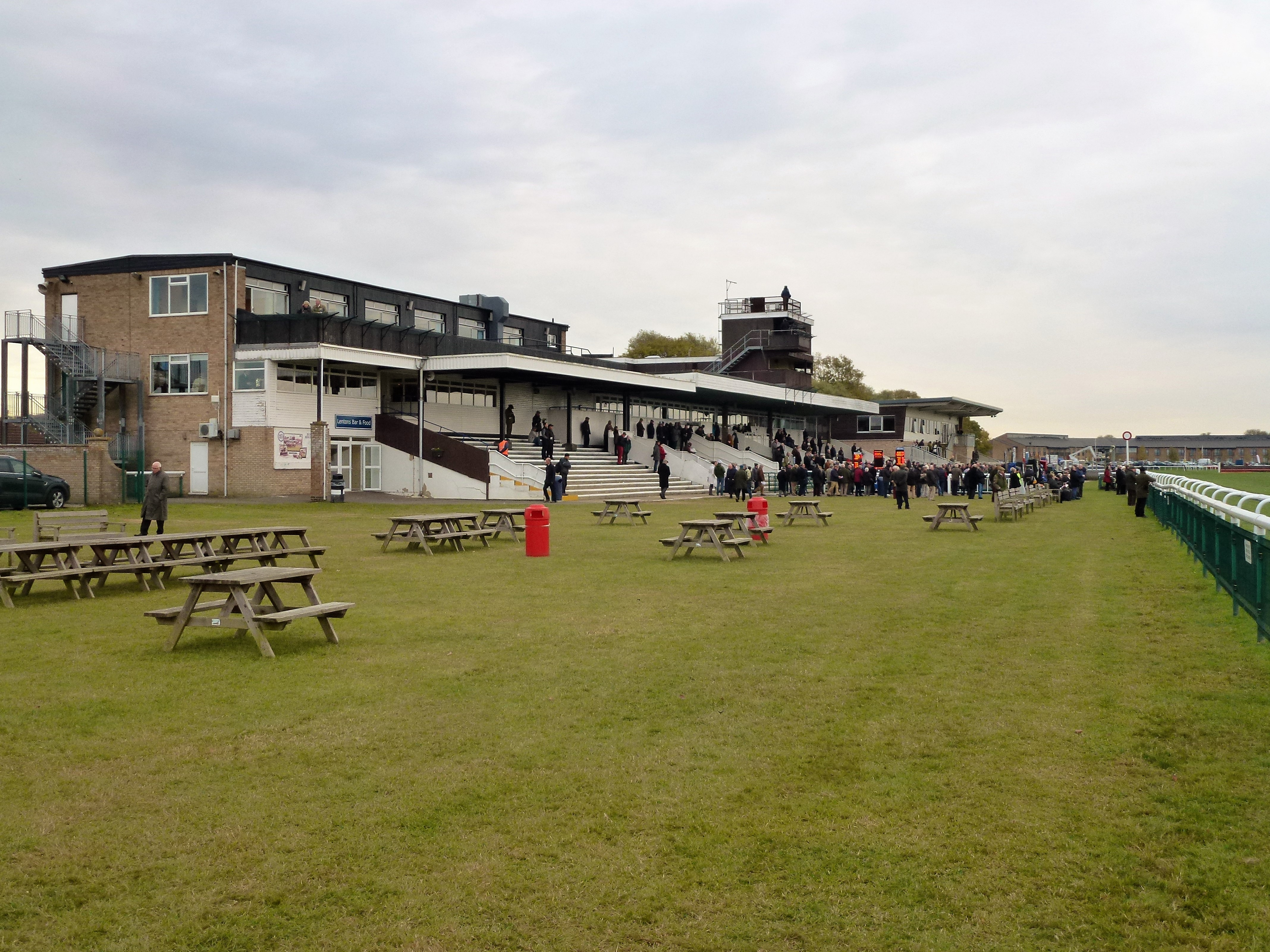
- Interactive map of Huntingdon Racecourse
- Location: Huntingdon, Cambridgeshire
- Owned by: Jockey Club Racecourses
- Screened on: Racing TV
- Course type: National Hunt
- Notable races: Peterborough Chase

Huntingdon Racecourse is a thoroughbred horse racing venue located in Brampton near Huntingdon, Cambridgeshire, England. It is located on a Site of Special Scientific Interest of the original Brampton Racecourse.

The most notable race held at Huntingdon Racecourse is the Peterborough Chase in December.

== History ==
The first race meeting at Huntingdon Racecourse took place on Easter Monday, 1886. The race was a three mile steeplechase won by a horse named Catherine The Great. In 1920, the racecourse was part of the Huntingdon Steeplechase Group managed by Bob Lenton for 25 years. In 1953, chairman of the committee John Goodcliff managed construction of the grandstand that still stands on the racecourse today.

The Peterborough Chase is Huntingdon's showpiece event and started in 1969. By 1979 it secured its formal name as used today. The race has seen big name winners including Best Mate and One Man. Edredon Bleu is the most successful horse in the race, winning four times in a row between 1998 and 2001. Trainer Henrietta Knight saddled 8 winners in the race over 10 years.

Currently the racecourse is owned and operated by The Jockey Club.

Huntingdon Racecourse has been voted Best Small Racecourse in South Midlands and East Anglia by the Racegoers Club twice in 2011 and 2014.

== Course ==
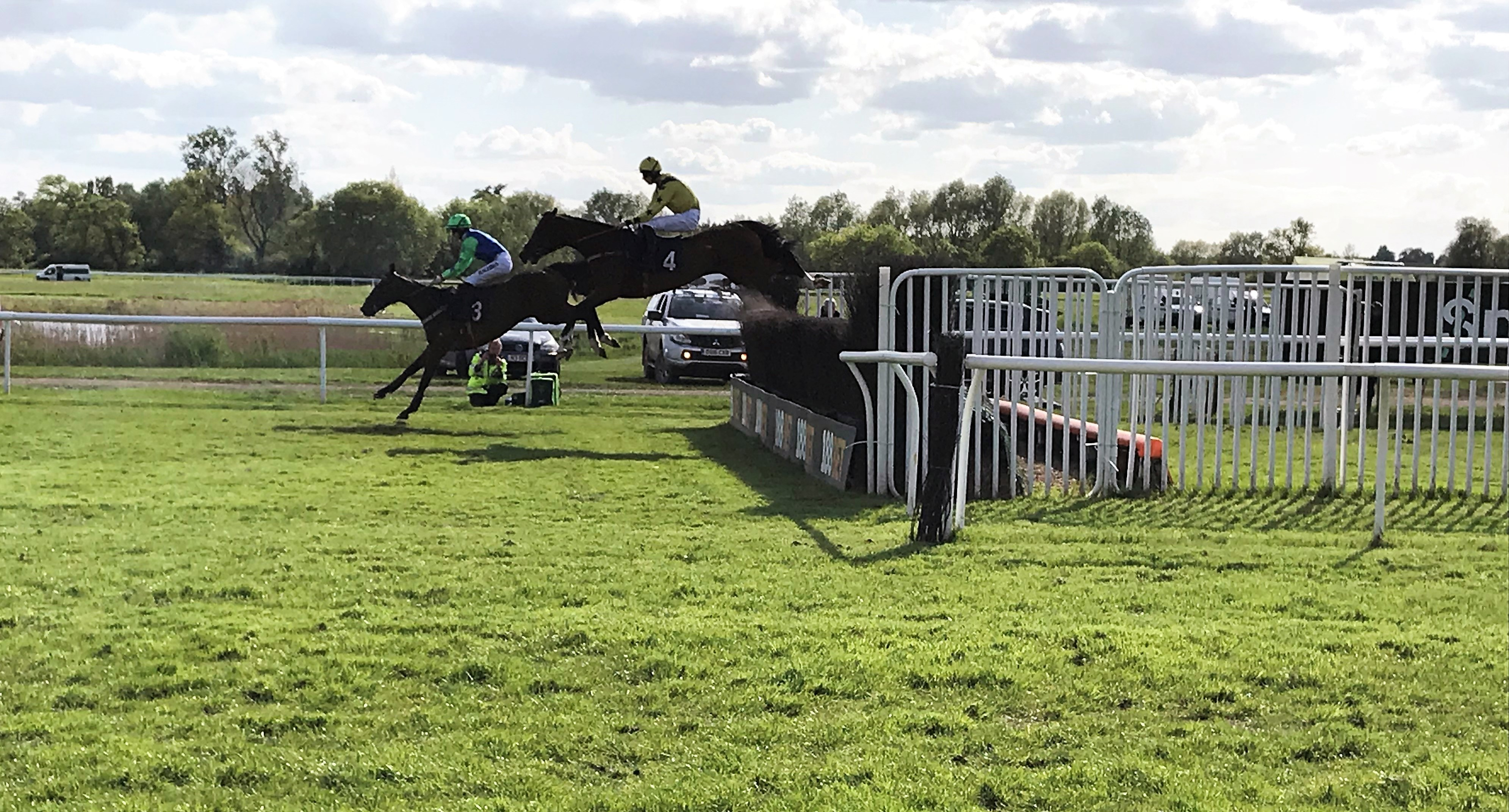
Jumping an open ditch

Huntingdon Racecourse only hosts National Hunt races. It is an oval shaped course that runs right-handed. It is notable for its flatness, with few undulations. It is a fast course, however due to its location there can be muddy and testing conditions.

The steeplechase course has nine fences, meanwhile the hurdle course has five on each circuit. The home straight features two fences for each type. Until 2008, Huntingdon featured a water jump.

The land the racecourse is on was originally known as Brampton Racecourse. It is a 21.1-hectare (52-acre) Site of Special Scientific Interest. It sits on the flood plain of Alconbury Brook and has a number of rare species including the largest population of green-winged orchids in the UK.

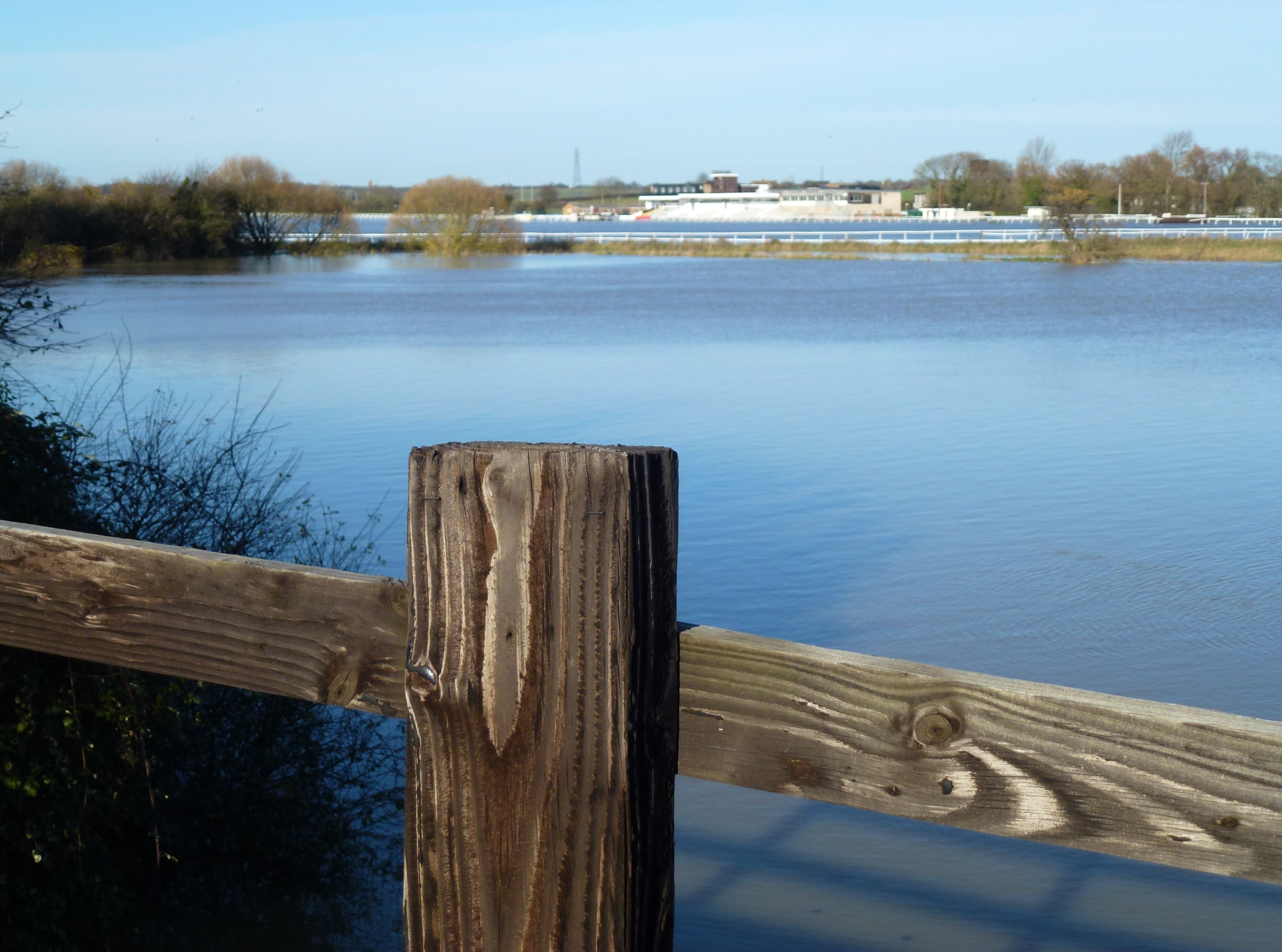
Severe flooding in 2012

Over the years, Huntingdon Racecourse has suffered with extensive flooding which has caused a number of race days to be postponed.

== Notable races ==
| Month | DOW | Race Name | Type | Grade | Distance | Age/Sex |
|---|---|---|---|---|---|---|
| February | Thursday | Sidney Banks Memorial Novices' Hurdle | Hurdle | Listed | 2m 3½f | 4yo + |
| December | Sunday | Peterborough Chase | Chase | Grade 2 | 2m 4½f | 4yo + |
