= Richard Burridge (screenwriter) =

British screenwriter and author

- Born: 1951 (age 73–74); Rothbury, Northumberland
- Occupation(s): Screenwriter, author

Richard Burridge (born 1951, in Rothbury, Northumberland) is a British film screenwriter and author. His credits include Absolute Beginners (1986). With his family he is an owner of several racehorses, including the late Desert Orchid.
