= Sammartino =

Sammartino or Sanmartino is an Italian surname that may refer to:

- Bruno Sammartino (1935–2018), Italian-born American professional wrestler
- David Sammartino (born 1961), American professional wrestler, son of Bruno
- Fred Sammartino, American communication engineer and company executive
- Giuseppe Sanmartino (or Sammartino, 1720–1793), Italian sculptor
- Janis Lynn Sammartino (born 1950), American judge
- Marco Sammartino, late 17th-century Italian painter and etcher
