= Jim Lewis (racehorse owner) =

British racehorse owner (1934–2023)

Jim Lewis (16 June 1934 – 26 February 2023) was a British racehorse owner, particularly noted for being the owner of thrice Cheltenham Gold Cup winner Best Mate and also Edredon Bleu. He worked with trainers Henrietta Knight and Venetia Williams and jockey Jim Culloty. He was a supporter of Aston Villa F.C., whose claret and blue colours his horses wore. Lewis ran the Silentnight bed manufacturing company before setting up his own business importing furniture.

Lewis died from kidney failure on 26 February 2023 at the age of 88.
