= Edredon Bleu =

20th-century steeplechaser racehorse

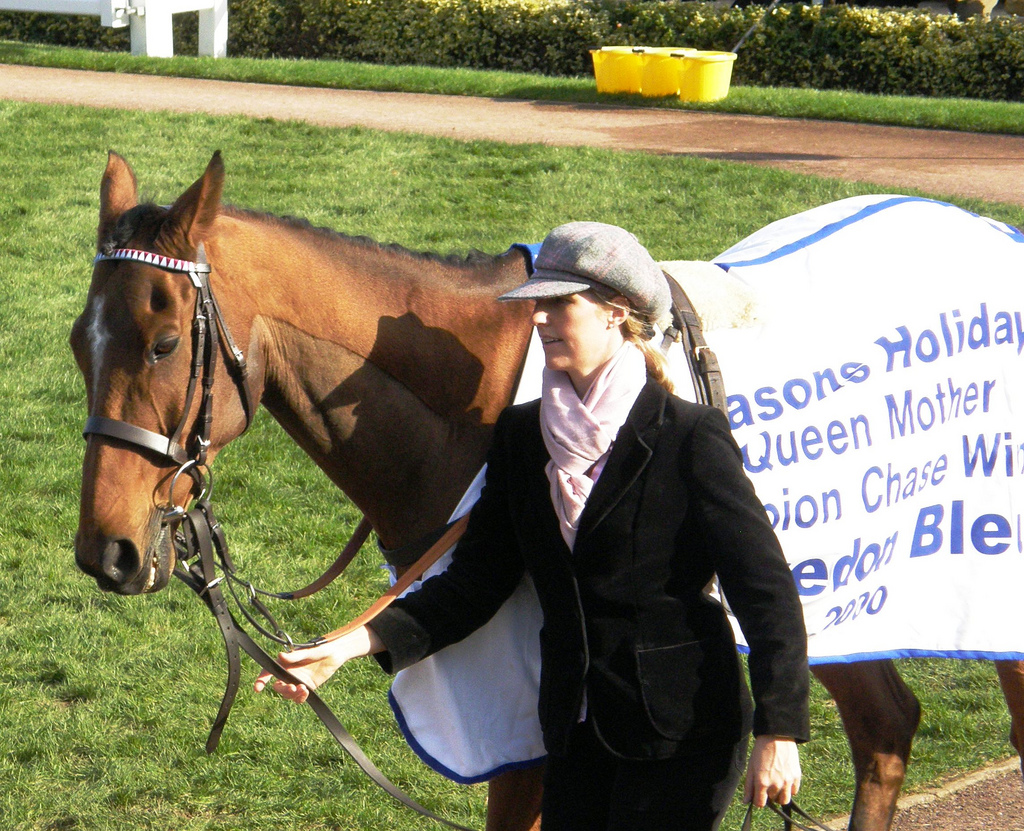
- Edredon Bleu in 2007.
- Sire: Grand Tresor
- Grandsire: Grandchant
- Dam: Nuit Bleue
- Damsire: Le Pontet
- Sex: Gelding
- Foaled: 26 April 1992
- Died: 30 September 2018
- Country: France
- Colour: Bay
- Breeder: Lucien Chevrollier
- Owner: Jim Lewis
- Trainer: Henrietta Knight
- Record: 57: 25-7-6
- Earnings: £731,065

Major wins
- Grand Annual Chase (1998); Peterborough Chase (1998, 1999, 2000, 2001); Queen Mother Champion Chase (2000); Championship Chase (2001); Haldon Gold Cup (2002, 2003); John Bull Chase (2003); Desert Orchid SW Pattern Chase (2003); Clonmel Oil Chase (2003); King George VI Chase (2003)

Edredon Bleu (26 April 1992 – 28 September 2018) was an AQPS National Hunt racehorse. He was bred in France but trained for most of his racing career in the United Kingdom. He was a specialist steeplechaser who recorded most of his wins over two and two-and-a-half miles, but was capable of winning major races over longer distances. In a ten-year racing career he ran fifty-seven times and won twenty-five races. His most important successes when winning the Queen Mother Champion Chase in 2000 and the King George VI Chase in 2003.

Edredon Bleu was euthanised on 28 September 2018 at the age of 26.

== Racing career ==
In 2000, Edredon Bleu won the Queen Mother Champion Chase while ridden by Tony McCoy. He also won the 2003 King George VI Chase and four renewals of the Peterborough Chase from 1998 to 2001.
