= Best Mate =

Irish-bred Thoroughbred racehorse

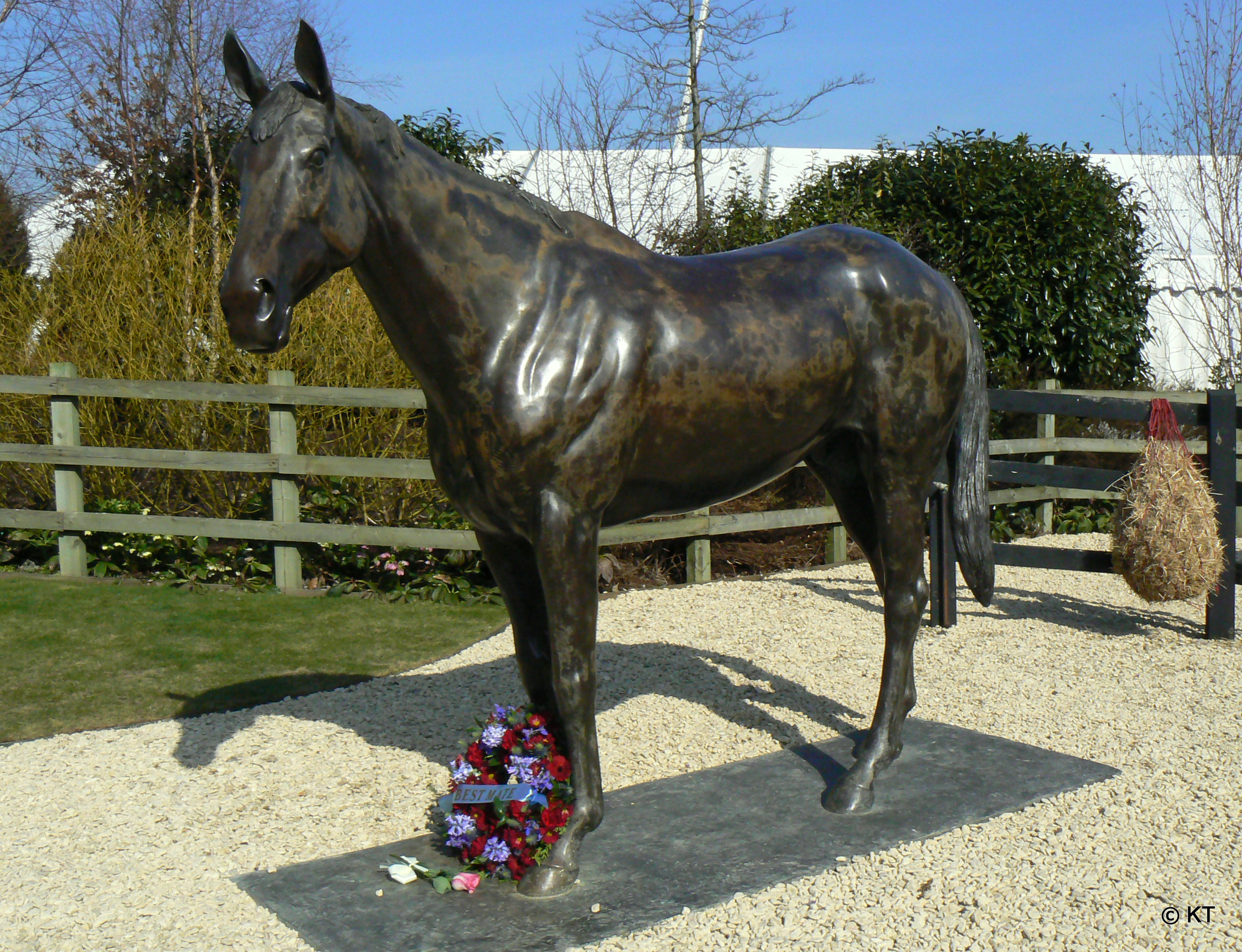
- Statue of Best Mate at Cheltenham
- Sire: Un Desperado
- Grandsire: Top Ville
- Dam: Katday
- Damsire: Miller's Mate
- Sex: Gelding
- Foaled: 28 January 1995
- Died: 1 November 2005 (aged 10); Exeter, Devon, England
- Country: Ireland
- Colour: Bay
- Breeder: Jacques Van't Hart
- Owner: Jim Lewis
- Trainer: Henrietta Knight
- Record: 22: 14-7-0
- Earnings: £1,022,436

Major wins
- Mersey Novices' Hurdle (2000); November Novices' Chase (2000); Scilly Isles Novices' Chase (2001); Haldon Gold Cup (2001); Cheltenham Gold Cup (2002, 2003, 2004); Peterborough Chase (2002); King George VI Chase (2002); Ericsson Chase (2003)

Awards
- British Horse Racing Board's Jump Horse of the Year, Champion Three-Mile Chaser for second year running.

Honours
- Statue and Best Mate Enclosure at Cheltenham Racecourse Added to Cheltenham's Hall of Fame at the 2007 meet, along with Desert Orchid
- Last updated on 14 February 2007

Best Mate (28 January 1995 – 1 November 2005) was an Irish-bred, English-trained racehorse and three-time winner of the Cheltenham Gold Cup. He was a popular horse, and his sudden death while racing made front-page news.

== Background ==
Best Mate was a bay gelding. He was foaled on 28 January 1995. His French sire, Un Desperado, won the Prix Eugène Adam in 1986. His dam, Katday, had raced on the flat and been bought by breeder Jacques Van't Hart for 1,250 Irish guineas. As a yearling, Best Mate was bought by bloodstock agent Tony Costello for 2,500 Irish guineas. He was pulled up in his first point-to-point in Ireland in February 1999. After his first win, he was purchased by Terry Biddlecombe and trainer Henrietta Knight for owner Jim Lewis. He went into training at Knight's yard in West Lockinge, Oxfordshire.

== Racing career ==
Best Mate made a winning debut under Rules in a Cheltenham bumper in November 1999, and three weeks later won a novice hurdle race at Sandown Park. He then finished runner-up over hurdles twice, including the Supreme Novices' Hurdle at Cheltenham, before winning the April 2000 running of the Mersey Novices' Hurdle at Aintree. He won his first race over fences at Exeter in October 2000, following it up with a win in the November Novices' Chase at Cheltenham and completing a treble with a win in the Scilly Isles Novices' Chase in February 2001. On his final hurdle race, Best Mate was runner-up to Barton in the 2001 Aintree Hurdle.

Best Mate was favourite to win the Arkle Challenge Trophy at the Cheltenham Festival in 2001, but the festival was cancelled due to the foot and mouth outbreak crisis in the UK that year. He won the Cheltenham Gold Cup in 2002, 2003, and 2004 with jockey Jim Culloty. In 2003 he became the first horse to win the Gold Cup more than once since L'Escargot in 1970 and 1971, and in 2004 he became the first horse since Arkle in 1964-1966 to win three times. He was withdrawn from the 2005 race eight days before the event, having burst a blood vessel on the gallops. He also won the 2002 King George VI Chase and the 2003 Ericsson Chase.

Best Mate never fell at a fence or hurdle. He came first or second in all his 22 starts, except for his final race when he was pulled up before his collapse and death. His victories included six Grade 1 races and four Grade 2 races, while he came second in five Grade 1 races and two Grade 2 races. He ran in one handicap chase (2001/2002 First National Gold Cup), where he failed by 1/2 length to give 20 lbs to Wahiba Sands.

Best Mate was known for weaving in his box and was turned out every day with stable-mate Edredon Bleu. A popular horse, he used to receive fan mail at his yard and visitors flocked to see him on open days.

== Death ==
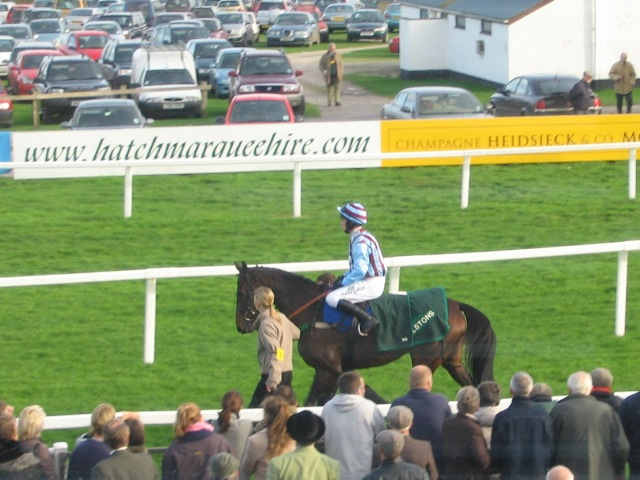
Best Mate at his last race shortly before his death on 1 November 2005

Best Mate collapsed and died of a suspected heart attack after being pulled up by jockey Paul Carberry whilst competing in the William Hill Haldon Gold Cup at Exeter Racecourse on 1 November 2005. After the jockey dismounted, the horse stumbled and went onto his knees. Best Mate's death was national news, with headlines including Who can fill the void left by Best Mate?, Best Mate leaves golden memories after giving his all for final time, Heartbreak at Exeter as Best Mate collapses and dies and Perfect horse Best Mate dies at trainer's feet.

Culloty, who had ridden Best Mate in 18 of his 22 starts, paid tribute to him: "The fact he was as good as he was, as honest as he was, and as consistent as he was, was why the public came to love him and deservedly so".

Government regulations prevented the burial of his body on the Exeter course as Lewis and many racing fans desired. Instead Best Mate was cremated, and his ashes were buried beside the winning post at Cheltenham Racecourse on 10 December 2005. Lewis was in attendance even though his wife, Valerie, had died on 8 December after a 7-month battle against cancer.

== Assessment and honours ==
The highest Timeform rating for Arkle was 212, while Best Mate's highest rating was 182. Timeform themselves felt that Best Mate's rating could have been higher if he had raced in more handicaps.

There is a bronze statue in memory of Best Mate near the farm at which he was trained and another at Cheltenham Racecourse. He inducted into the Cheltenham Hall of Fame in March 2007. In a DVD about him, Alastair Down narrates:

A horse, up a gallop. But not just any horse. This one, a three-time Cheltenham Gold Cup winner, and in the process of establishing his pre-eminence, became one of those rare animals who get under our skin, and graduate to being public property. Many promise, but few deliver as Best Mate did.

The Best Mate Chase is a feature race at Exeter Racecourse in October and the race day is known as Best Mate Chase Day. A memorial to Best Mate stands outside the Exeter weighing room.

== Pedigree ==
Pedigree of Best Mate (IRE), bay gelding, 1995
Sire Un Desperado (FR) 1983	Top Ville (IRE); 1976	High Top	Derring-Do
Sire Un Desperado (FR) 1983	Top Ville (IRE); 1976	High Top	Camenae
Sire Un Desperado (FR) 1983	Top Ville (IRE); 1976	Sega Ville	Charlottesville
Sire Un Desperado (FR) 1983	Top Ville (IRE); 1976	Sega Ville	La Sega
Sire Un Desperado (FR) 1983	White Lightning (FR); 1970	Baldric	Round Table
Sire Un Desperado (FR) 1983	White Lightning (FR); 1970	Baldric	Two Cities
Sire Un Desperado (FR) 1983	White Lightning (FR); 1970	Rough Sea	Herbager
Sire Un Desperado (FR) 1983	White Lightning (FR); 1970	Rough Sea	Sea Nymph
Dam Katday (FR) 1987	Miller's Mate (GB); 1982	Mill Reef	Never Bend
Dam Katday (FR) 1987	Miller's Mate (GB); 1982	Mill Reef	Milan Mill
Dam Katday (FR) 1987	Miller's Mate (GB); 1982	Primatie	Vaguely Noble
Dam Katday (FR) 1987	Miller's Mate (GB); 1982	Primatie	Pistol Packer
Dam Katday (FR) 1987	Kanara (FR); 1973	Hauban	Sicambre
Dam Katday (FR) 1987	Kanara (FR); 1973	Hauban	Hygie
Dam Katday (FR) 1987	Kanara (FR); 1973	Alika	Auriban
Dam Katday (FR) 1987	Kanara (FR); 1973	Alika	Pretty Lady (Family: 1-e)

== See also ==
- Repeat winners of horse races
- List of racehorses
