= Henrietta Knight (racehorse trainer) =

English Thoroughbred racehorse trainer

Henrietta Catherine Knight (born 15 December 1946) is an English Thoroughbred racehorse trainer. Knight is best known as a trainer of National Hunt racehorses. She trained triple Cheltenham Gold Cup winner Best Mate (2002, 2003, 2004), also winner of the 2003 King George VI Chase, and the 2000 Queen Mother Champion Chase winner Edredon Bleu, also winner of the 2003 King George VI Chase. She retired in 2012 with over 700 winners to her name.

== Life and career ==
She is the daughter of Major Hubert Guy Broughton Knight (1917–1993) and Hester Loyd. Her sister, Celia Elizabeth Knight (1949–2020), was married to Samuel Vestey, 3rd Baron Vestey.

An Oxford graduate, Knight worked as a biology and history teacher before becoming a trainer. She was a prominent figure in the equestrian sport of eventing, finishing 12th at the Badminton Horse Trials in 1973, and becoming the chairperson of the British Olympic Games Horse Trials Selection Committee from 1984 to 1988. This period included the selection of the Silver medal-winning team for the Seoul Olympics.

Knight began training under rules in 1989 having previously trained over 100 winners on the amateur point-to-point circuit from 1984 to 1989. Her training base is a farm in West Lockinge, near Wantage in Oxfordshire.

Knight married former champion National Hunt jockey Terry Biddlecombe in 1995 and has no children. Biddlecombe died on 5 January 2014.

Knight trained the Jim and Valerie Lewis owned triple Cheltenham Gold Cup winner Best Mate (2002, 2003, 2004), also winner of the 2003 King George VI Chase. She trained the 2000 Queen Mother Champion Chase winner Edredon Bleu, also winner of the 2003 King George VI Chase.

Among her other stable stars were Calgary Bay, who won the Dipper Novices' Chase at Cheltenham in January 2009, Somersby, who won the Grade 1 Victor Chandler Chase at Ascot in 2012 after impressing many in the top novice events at the Aintree and Cheltenham Festivals, and Racing Demon, the winner of the Peterborough Chase at Huntingdon Racecourse in 2006 and 2007.

Knight retired in 2012 with over 700 winners to her name. In November 2023, she announced that she would be returning to training. She made her reappearance on the racecourse with two runners at Wincanton on 12 January 2024.

Knight is the author of five books: Best Mate: Chasing Gold (2003); Best Mate: Triple Gold (2004); Not Enough Time - My Life with Terry Biddlecombe (2015); The Jumping Game (2019); Starting from Scratch: Inspired to be a Jump Jockey (2019).

== Major wins ==
- Cheltenham Gold Cup - (3) - Best Mate (2002, 2003, 2004)
- Clarence House Chase - (1) - Somersby (2012)
- Clonmel Oil Chase - (1) - Edredon Bleu (2003)
- Dipper Novices' Chase - (1) - Calgary Bay (2009)
- Glenlivet Hurdle - (1) - Stompin (1996)
- Grand Annual Chase - (1) - Edredon Bleu (1998)
- King George VI Chase - (2) - Best Mate (2002), Edredon Bleu (2003)
- Lanzarote Hurdle - (1) - Heart (2000)
- Lexus Chase - (1) - Best Mate (2003)
- Mersey Novices' Hurdle - (1) - Best Mate (2000)
- Peterborough Chase - (8} - Edredon Bleu (1998, 1999, 2000, 2001), Best Mate (2002), Impek (2005), Racing Demon (2006, 2007)
- Queen Mother Champion Chase - (1) - Edredon Bleu (2000)
- Scilly Isles Novices' Chase - (1) - Best Mate (2001)
- Stayers Hurdle - (1) - Karshi (1997)
- Sun Alliance Chase - (1) - Lord Noelie (2000)
- Victor Chandler Chase - (1) - Somersby (2012)
