= Jim Culloty =

Racehorse trainer

Jim Culloty is a racehorse trainer and retired professional National Hunt jockey who won both the Cheltenham Gold Cup and Grand National in the same season. Culloty and Mick Fitzgerald both worked for Jackie Retter, who trained at Whitstone, near Exeter, before they went their separate ways, Culloty to work for Henrietta Knight while Fitzgerald went with Nicky Henderson.

Culloty rode forty-four winners as an amateur during the 1996 racing season, after which he turned professional. Throughout his career he won 394 races.

He is most associated with two horses, Best Mate and Bindaree, winning three consecutive Cheltenham Gold Cups on the former, and in 2002 going on to win the Grand National on the latter. He later became only the 4th person ever to ride and train a horse to the Cheltenham Gold Cup when training Lord Windermere under jockey Davy Russell.

Culloty retired in July 2005, not long after Best Mate had suffered a fatal heart attack while being ridden by Paul Carberry. Today he runs the J H Culloty racing stables at Mount Corbitt House in Churchtown, County Cork, Ireland. and lives in Somerby, Leicestershire with his three children. He volunteers as Clerk of the Course at Garthorpe Racecourse, near Melton Mowbray, for four point-to-point meetings each year.
