= 1930 in sports =

1930 in sports describes the year's events in world sport.

== American football ==
- NFL championship – Green Bay Packers (10–3–1)
- College football national championship – Notre Dame Fighting Irish

== Association football ==
FIFA World Cup

- The inaugural World Cup is held in Uruguay and is won by the host nation as Uruguay defeats Argentina 4–2 in the final.

Brazil

- São Paulo FC was established on January 25.

England

- The Football League – Sheffield Wednesday 60 points, Derby County 50, Manchester City 47, Aston Villa 47, Leeds United 46, Blackburn Rovers 45
- FA Cup final – Arsenal 2–0 Huddersfield Town at Empire Stadium, Wembley, London

Germany

- National Championship – Hertha BSC 5–4 Holstein Kiel at Düsseldorf

Spain

- La Liga won by Athletic Bilbao

Italy

- The inaugural Serie A is won by Ambrosiana

== Athletics ==
Czechoslovakia

- the third Women's World Games, Prague

== Australian rules football ==
VFL Premiership

- Collingwood wins the 34th VFL Premiership, beating Geelong 14.16 (100) to 9.16 (70) at Melbourne Cricket Ground (MCG)

Brownlow Medal

- The annual Brownlow Medal is awarded to Stan Judkins (Richmond), Allan Hopkins (Footscray)^{[a]} and Harry Collier (Collingwood)^{[a]}

South Australian National Football League

- 4 October: North Adelaide 9.13 (67) defeats Port Adelaide 9.9 (63) for its fifth SA(N)FL premiership
- Magarey Medal won by Walter Scott (Norwood)

West Australian Football League

- 4 October: East Fremantle 12.15 (87) defeats South Fremantle 7.9 (51) to win its third consecutive premiership.
- Sandover Medal won by Ted Flemming (West Perth)

== Bandy ==
Sweden

- Championship final – SK Tirfing 1-0 Djurgårdens IF

== Baseball ==
World Series

- 1–8 October — Philadelphia Athletics defeats St Louis Cardinals to win the 1930 World Series by 4 games to 2

== Basketball ==
ABL Championship

- Cleveland Rosenblums over Rochester Centrals (4–1)

Events

- The South American Basketball Championship 1930 is the first major international basketball competition when four South American teams play in Montevideo and the host nation Uruguay wins the tournament.

Europe

- Olimpia Milan, most successful professional basketball club in Italy, officially founded.
- Club Joventut Badalona was founded in Spain

== Bobsleigh ==
World Bobsleigh Championships

- Inaugural world championship is held at Caux-sur-Montreux in Switzerland. It features a four-man bob event only, which is won by Italy.

== Boxing ==
Events

- Max Schmeling defeats Jack Sharkey by a controversial fourth round foul punch decision to take the vacant World Heavyweight Championship title

Lineal world champions

- World Heavyweight Championship – vacant → Max Schmeling
- World Light Heavyweight Championship – vacant → Maxie Rosenbloom
- World Middleweight Championship – Mickey Walker
- World Welterweight Championship – Jackie Fields → "Young" Jack Thompson → Tommy Freeman
- World Lightweight Championship – Sammy Mandell → Al Singer → Tony Canzoneri
- World Featherweight Championship – Bat Battalino
- World Bantamweight Championship – "Panama" Al Brown
- World Flyweight Championship – vacant

== Canadian football ==
Grey Cup

- 18th Grey Cup – Toronto Balmy Beach 11–6 Regina Roughriders

== Cricket ==
Events

- January — New Zealand plays its inaugural Test match, losing to England at Christchurch by eight wickets. England goes on to win the series 1–0 with three matches drawn.
- Having scored 1586 runs in the 1929–30 Australian season at an average of 113.28 and including a world record individual innings of 452*, Don Bradman continues in the same vein through the Australian tour of England in 1930. Australia regains The Ashes, winning the Test series by 2–1 with two matches drawn. Bradman, with 974 runs in the series (still a world record), is the main difference between two strong teams. The highlight of the tour is Bradman's remarkable innings at Headingley in the Third Test when he makes 309 not out in a single day (his final score is 334).

England

- County Championship – Lancashire
- Minor Counties Championship – Durham
- Most runs – Don Bradman 2960 @ 98.66 (HS 334)
- Most wickets – Tich Freeman 275 @ 16.84 (BB 10–53)
- Wisden Cricketers of the Year – Donald Bradman, Clarrie Grimmett, Beverley Lyon, Ian Peebles, Maurice Turnbull

Australia

- Sheffield Shield – Victoria
- Most runs – Don Bradman 1586 @ 113.28 (HS 452*)
- Most wickets – Clarrie Grimmett 82 @ 23.69 (BB 7–136)

India

- Bombay Quadrangular – Hindus

New Zealand

- Plunket Shield – Wellington

South Africa

- Currie Cup – not contested

West Indies

- Inter-Colonial Tournament – not contested

== Cycling ==
Tour de France

- André Leducq (France) wins the 24th Tour de France

== Figure skating ==
World Figure Skating Championships

- World Men's Champion – Karl Schäfer (Austria)
- World Women's Champion – Sonja Henie (Norway)
- World Pairs Champions – Andreé Joly-Brunet and Pierre Brunet (France)

== Golf ==
Events

- Bobby Jones becomes the first man to win the golfing Grand Slam

Major tournaments

- British Open – Bobby Jones
- U.S. Open – Bobby Jones
- PGA Championship – Tommy Armour

Other tournaments

- British Amateur – Bobby Jones
- U.S. Amateur – Bobby Jones

Women's professional

- Women's Western Open – Lucia Mida

== Handball ==
25 November – The Swedish Handball Federation is established.

== Horse racing ==
England

- Champion Hurdle – Brown Tony
- Cheltenham Gold Cup – Easter Hero
- Grand National – Shaun Goilin
- 1,000 Guineas Stakes – Fair Isle
- 2,000 Guineas Stakes – Diolite
- The Derby – Blenheim
- The Oaks – Rose of England
- St. Leger Stakes – Singapore

Australia

- Melbourne Cup – Phar Lap

Canada

- King's Plate – Aymond

France

- Prix de l'Arc de Triomphe – Motrico

Ireland

- Irish Grand National – Fanmond
- Irish Derby Stakes – Rock Star

USA

- Kentucky Derby – Gallant Fox
- Preakness Stakes – Gallant Fox
- Belmont Stakes – Gallant Fox

== Ice hockey ==
Stanley Cup

- 28–29 March — Montreal Canadiens defeats Boston Bruins by 2 games to 0 in the 1930 Stanley Cup Finals

== Multi-sport events ==
British Empire Games

- Inaugural British Empire Games, precursor of the Commonwealth Games are held at Hamilton, Ontario

Far Eastern Championship Games

- 9th Far Eastern Championship Games are held at Tokyo, Empire of Japan

== Nordic skiing ==
FIS Nordic World Ski Championships

- 5th FIS Nordic World Ski Championships 1930 are held at Oslo-Holmenkollen ski jump, Norway

== Rowing ==
The Boat Race

- 12 April — Cambridge wins the 82nd Oxford and Cambridge Boat Race

== Rugby league ==
- The Australia national rugby league team completed on the 1929–30 Kangaroo tour of Great Britain.

England

- Championship – Huddersfield
- Challenge Cup final – Widnes 10–3 St. Helens at Empire Stadium, Wembley, London
- Lancashire League Championship – St. Helens
- Yorkshire League Championship – Huddersfield
- Lancashire County Cup – Warrington 15–2 Salford
- Yorkshire County Cup – Hull Kingston Rovers 13–7 Hunslet

Australia

- NSW Premiership – Western Suburbs 27–2 St George (grand final)

== Rugby union ==
Five Nations Championship

- 43rd Five Nations Championship series is won by England

== Snooker ==
World Championship

- 4th World Snooker Championship is won by Joe Davis who defeats Tom Dennis 25–12

== Speed skating ==
Speed Skating World Championships

- Men's All-round Champion – Michael Staksrud (Norway)

== Tennis ==
Australia

- Australian Men's Singles Championship – Edgar Moon (Australia) defeats Harry Hopman (Australia) 6–3 6–1 6–3
- Australian Women's Singles Championship – Daphne Akhurst Cozens (Australia) defeats Sylvia Lance Harper (Australia) 10–8 2–6 7–5

England

- Wimbledon Men's Singles Championship – Bill Tilden (USA) defeats Wilmer Allison (USA) 6–3 9–7 6–4
- Wimbledon Women's Singles Championship – Helen Wills Moody (USA) defeats Elizabeth Ryan (USA) 6–2 6–2

France

- French Men's Singles Championship – Henri Cochet (France) defeats Bill Tilden (USA) 3–6 8–6 6–3 6–1
- French Women's Singles Championship – Helen Wills Moody (USA) defeats Helen Jacobs (USA) 6–2 6–1

USA

- American Men's Singles Championship – John Doeg (USA) defeats Frank Shields (USA) 10–8 1–6 6–4 16–14
- American Women's Singles Championship – Betty Nuthall Shoemaker (Great Britain) defeats Anna McCune Harper (USA) 6–1 6–4

Davis Cup

- 1930 International Lawn Tennis Challenge – France 4–1 United States at Stade Roland Garros (clay) Paris, France

== Yacht racing ==
America's Cup

- The New York Yacht Club retains the America's Cup as Enterprise defeats British challenger Shamrock V, of the Royal Ulster Yacht Club by 4 races to 0

== Notes ==
^{a} Awarded retrospectively by the VFL in 1989.
