= 1937 Grand National =

English steeplechase horse race

- Grand National
- Location: Aintree Racecourse
- Date: 19 March 1937
- Winning horse: Royal Mail
- Starting price: 100/6
- Jockey: (Wales) Evan Williams
- Trainer: (Wales) Ivor Anthony
- Owner: Hugh Lloyd Thomas
- Conditions: Soft

External videos
- Highlights of the 1937 Grand National (British Pathé)

The 1937 Grand National was the 96th running of the Grand National horse race that took place at Aintree Racecourse near Liverpool, England, on 19 March 1937. The estimated crowd of 300,000 is believed by the Aintree executive to be a record for the race, though only those who watched from the racecourse proper were charged admission.

In attendance at Aintree were King George VI and Queen Elizabeth. The steeplechase was won by the aptly-named Royal Mail, at odds of 100/6. The eight-year-old was ridden by jockey Evan Williams and trained by Ivor Anthony, for owner Hugh Lloyd Thomas.

Golden Miller, winner in 1934, went off as 8/1 favourite but refused at the tenth fence, the same obstacle he refused to jump in the 1935 National. Cooleen finished the race in second place, and finished fourth the following year and again in 1939. Pucka Belle was third and Ego fourth. Thirty-three horses ran and all returned safely to the stables.

== Media coverage and aftermath ==
Sixteen-year-old Bruce Hobbs was the youngest rider in the race and later commented that he would have been placed on his mount, Flying Minutes had he not become too excited four fences from home and fallen off in a manner similar to stepping of a bicycle. "Luckily there were no photographers at the fence to record it and I wasn't hurt." Unfortunately for Hobbs he had forgotten that the newsreel cameras had covered the entire race and had indeed captured his fall on film.

== Finishing order ==
Position	Name	Jockey	Age	Handicap (st-lb)	SP	Distance
1	Royal Mail	Evan Williams	8	11-13	100/6	3 Lengths
2	Coolean	Jack Fawcus	9	11-4		10 Lengths
3	Pucka Belle	Mr E Bailey	11	10-7		
4	Ego	Harry Llewellyn	10	10-9		
5	Crown Prince	Ronald Strutt	12	10-5		
6	Pencraik	George Archibald	10	10-3		
7	Don Bradman	Alec Marsh	11	10-8		

== Non-finishers ==
Position/Fate	Name	Jockey	Age	Handicap (st-lb)	SP
Refused (10th)	Golden Miller	Danny Morgan	10	12-7	
Fell (2nd)	What Have You	Mr C.Streett	9	11-5	
Fell (12th)	Ready Cash	Thomas F Carey	10	11-3	
Unseated rider (8th)	Delaneige	Tim Hamey	12	11-2	
	Dawmar	James 'Jim' Richardson	7	10-3	
	Didorio	Frenchie Nicholson	8	10-10	
	Tapinois	F Maxwell	9	10-10	
	Buckthorn	Keith Piggott	9	10-9	
Unseated rider (24th)	Delachance	Fred Rimell	8	10-9	
	Keen Blade	Mr E.Paget	10	10-7	
	Sunspot II	Bob Everett	7	10-5	
	Emancipator	Peter Cazalet	9	10-5	
Refused (Start)	Misdemeanour II	Sean Magee	8	10-4	
Fell (27th)	Flying Minutes	Bruce Hobbs	7	10-2	
Unseated rider (7th)	Kiltoi	Perry Harding	8	10-1	
	Milk Punch	C.Wilson	13	10-0	
	Dryburgh	B.Carter	8	10-0	
Unseated rider (before 17th)	Drim	Mr M.Tighe	10	10-0	
	Irvine	Mr A.Parker	8	10-0	
	Blaze	Billy Parvin	8	10-0	
	Uncle Batt	D.McCarthy	11	10-0	
	Field Master	Mr Densham	9	10-0	
	Sugar Loaf	Ernest Carr	10	10-0	
	True Blue	Mr Cohen	9	10-0	
	Spionaud	Eric Brown	9	10-0	
	Passing Fancy	D.Holland	9	10-0	
