= 1931 Grand National =

English steeplechase horse race

- Grand National
- Location: Aintree Racecourse
- Date: 27 March 1931
- Winning horse: Grakle
- Starting price: 100/6
- Jockey: Bob Lyall
- Trainer: Tom Coulthwaite
- Owner: Cecil Taylor
- Conditions: Good to firm

External videos
- Highlights of the 1931 Grand National (British Pathé)

The 1931 Grand National was the 90th renewal of the Grand National horse race that took place at Aintree near Liverpool, England, on 27 March 1931.

The steeplechase was won by Grakle, at odds of 100/6. The nine-year-old was ridden by jockey Bob Lyall and trained by Tom Coulthwaite for owner Cecil Taylor, who collected the £9,310 prize.

Gregalach, winner in 1929, finished in second place; Annandale was third and Rhyticere fourth. Forty-three horses ran and all but two returned safely to the stables. Swift Roland was fatally injured at Becher's Brook when another faller landed on him, and Drin was euthanised after incurring a leg fracture at Valentine's Brook.

== Finishing order ==
Position	Name	Jockey	Age	Handicap (st-lb)	SP	Distance
01	Grakle	Bob Lyall	9	11-7	100/6	1.5 Lengths
02	Gregalach	John Moloney	11	12-4	25/1	10 Lengths
03	Annandale	Tommy Morgan	9	10-7		
04	Rhyticere	L.Niaudot	9	10-12		
05	Ballyhanwood	Tom Isaac	10	10-7		
06	Shaun Goilin	Murtagh Keogh	11	12-4		
07	Glangesia	J.Browne	11	10-10		
08	Melleray's Belle	James Mason	12	10-10		
09	Great Span	Gerald Hardy	10	11-0		
10	Starbox	Mr K.Urquhart	8	10-10		
11	Royal Arch II	J.Bedeloup	10	10-7		
12	Harewood	Kenyon Goode	9	10-7		

== Non-finishers ==
Position/Fate	Name	Jockey	Age	Handicap (st-lb)	SP
	Easter Hero	Dick Rees	11	12-7	5/1
	Gib	Eric Foster	8	12-5	
Pulled Up (24th)	Kakushin	Bob Everett	8	11-3	
	Drintyre	Captain Brownhill	8	11-7	
	Sir Lindsay	Mr Fred Thackray	8	11-7	
Fell (30th)	Kilbuck	T. Chisman	10	11-6	
	Trump Card	William Gurney	13	11-6	
	Gyi Lovam	Captain R.Popler	9	11-3	
	Theras	John Walsh	6	11-2	
Fell (6th)	Swift Roland	Ted Leader	10	11-2	
Unseated rider (24th)	Drin	Billy Speck	7	11-2	
	Guiding Light	Mr McKeever	10	11-0	
Unseated rider (30th)	Ballasport	D. Williams	7	11-0	
	Sandy Hook	Frank Fish	10	10-12	
Brought Down (30th)	Georginatown	F. Maxwell	10	10-12	
	Easy Virtue	Pat Powell	8	10-12	
	Big Black Boy	William Payne	9	10-12	
Fell (1st)	Apostasy	Fred Brookes	10	10-12	
	May King	Captain R G Fanshawe	12	10-10	
	Alike	Mr Sclater	8	10-10	
	Oxclose	Fred Gurney	7	10-10	
	Aspirant	Billy Parvin	8	10-10	
	Morekeen	J.Cooke	10	10-10	
Fell (22nd)	Solanum	Tim Hamey	6	10-8	
	Ruddyman	Eric Brown	12	10-8	
Fell (Before 22nd)	Tamasha	Mr G.Elliott	10	10-7	
	Pixie	Captain Reginald Sassoon	6	10-7	
	Mallard	William Carr	13	10-7	
	South Hill	Tommy Cullinan	9	10-7	
	Toy Bell	Danny Morgan	9	10-7	
	Slieve Green	Captain Moseley	10	10-7	
