= 1932 Grand National =

English steeplechase horse race

- Grand National
- Location: Aintree Racecourse
- Date: 18 March 1932
- Winning horse: (England) Forbra
- Starting price: 50/1
- Jockey: Tim Hamey
- Trainer: (England) Tom Rimell
- Owner: (England) William Parsonage
- Conditions: Good

External videos
- Highlights of the 1932 Grand National (British Pathé)

The 1932 Grand National was the 91st renewal of the Grand National horse race that took place at Aintree Racecourse near Liverpool, England, on 18 March 1932.

The race was won by Forbra at odds of 50/1. The seven-year-old was ridden by jockey Tim Hamey and trained by Tom Rimell.

Egremont finished in second place, Shaun Goilin, the winner in 1930, was third and Near East fourth. Thirty-six horses ran and all returned safely to the stables.

Edward, Prince of Wales was in attendance at Aintree for the showpiece steeplechase.

== Finishing order ==
Position	Name	Jockey	Age	Handicap (st-lb)	SP	Distance
1	Forbra	Tim Hamey	7	10-07	50/1	2 Lengths
2	Egremont	Mr E C Paget			33/1	
3	Shaun Goilin	Dudley Williams			40/1	
4	Near East	Tim McCarthy			50/1	
5	Aspirant	P.G.Lawson			66/1	
6	Heartbreak Hill	W.O'Grady			100/12	
7	Annandale	Billy Stott			100/7	
8	Sea Soldier	Mr A.G.Wilson			50/1	

== Non-finishers ==
Position/Fate	Name	Jockey	Age	Handicap (st-lb)	SP
	Apostasy	Billy Parvin			66/1
	Gibus	William Redmond			100/1
	Glangesia	Mr J.Ryan			33/1
	Vinicole	Danny Morgan			33/1
	Tootenhill	R McCarthy			66/1
	Alike	G Turner			50/1
	Aruntius	F Mason			100/1
	Merriment IV	Lord Haddington			45/1
	Inverse	Bob Lyall			33/1
	Quite Calm	Frederick Gurney			20/1
	Redlynch	Kenyon Goode			100/1
	Great Span	Gerald Hardy			20/1
	Holmes	Mr Beechener			20/1
	Evolution	Tommy Cullinan			50/1
	Coup De Chateau	Gerry Wilson			28/1
	Gregalach	Mr Fred Thackray			100/9
	Theras	Mr George Owen			66/1
	Hank	Mr F.E.McKeever			33/1
	Prince Cherry	J.Geary			100/1
	Dusty Foot	Billy Speck			25/1
	Ottawa	Ted Leader			40/1
	Grakle	Mr Jack Fawcus			100/12
	K.C.B.	James F Mason			50/1
	The Ace	F Maxwell			100/1
	Harewood	Mr R.H.Warden			66/1
	Pelorus Jack	Captain R.G.Fanshawe			22/1
	Delarue	William Kidney			100/1
	Ruddyman	Eric Brown			100/1
