= 1934 Grand National =

English steeplechase horse race

- Grand National
- Location: Aintree Racecourse
- Date: 23 March 1934
- Winning horse: (Republic of Ireland) Golden Miller
- Starting price: 8/1
- Jockey: Gerry Wilson
- Trainer: (England) Basil Briscoe
- Owner: (England) Dorothy Paget
- Conditions: Good to firm

External videos
- Highlights of the 1934 Grand National (British Pathé)

The 1934 Grand National was the 93rd renewal of the Grand National horse race that took place at Aintree Racecourse near Liverpool, England, on 23 March 1934.

It was won by 8/1 shot Golden Miller in 9:20.4, breaking The Huntsman's 72-year-old record, and also becoming the first horse to win both the Grand National and the Cheltenham Gold Cup in the same year. The seven-year-old was ridden by jockey Gerry Wilson and trained by Basil Briscoe for owner Dorothy Paget.

Delaneige finished in second place, Thomond II was third and 1932 winner Forbra was fourth.

Thirty horses ran and all returned safely to the stables.

== Finishing order ==
Position	Name	Jockey	Age	Handicap (st-lb)	SP	Distance
1	Golden Miller	Gerry Wilson	7	12-02	8/1	5 Lengths
2	Delaneige	John Moloney			100/7	
3	Thomond II	Billy Speck			18/1	
4	Forbra	Gerald Hardy			100/8	
5	Uncle Batt	A.Robson			45/1	
6	Blue Peter III	Mr F.Cundell			66/1	
7	Gregalach	Billy Parvin			25/1	
8	Apostasy	Eric Brown			66/1	
9	Annandale	Mr P.Payne-Gallwey			66/1	
10	Remus	Tommy Morgan			40/1	

== Non-finishers ==
Position/Fate	Name	Jockey	Age	Handicap (st-lb)	SP
(Fell 1st)	Pelorus Jack	Billy Stott			25/1
(Fell 1st)	Flambent	T.Duggan			66/1
(Fell 1st)	Fortnum	F.Sclater			33/1
(Fell 1st)	Sorley Boy	Danny Morgan			100/7
	Prince Cherry	J.H.Goswell			66/1
(Fell 1st)	Southern Hero	Jack Fawcus			25/1
Refused (12th)	Kilbuck	Tommy Cullinan			66/1
Fell (10th)	Master Orange	Mr Peter Cazalet			66/1
	Egremont	Mr E.C.Paget			66/1
Fell (13th)	Cantillius II	J.Mason			20/1
	Lone Eagle	Tim Hamey			50/1
	Trocadero	M.Thery			100/7
	Southern Hue	Thomas F Carey			66/1
	Really True	Mr Frank Furlong			7/1
	Ready Cash	Mr Fulke Walwyn			20/1
	Destiny Bay	H.Lloyd-Thomas			40/1
	Alpine Hut	Mr Perry Harding			20/1
	Slater	Keith Piggott			33/1
(Fell 11th)	Parson's Well	William Hollick			66/1
(Fell 11th)	The Ace II	Captain A.Head			66/1
