= Tommy Cullinan =

Irish jockey, winner of the Grand National

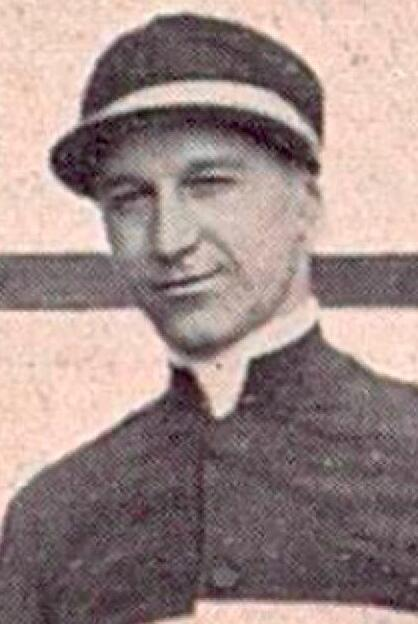
- Tommy Cullinan in 1928

Personal information
- Born: Thomas Brady Cullinan; 15 May 1906 Ennis, County Clare, Ireland
- Died: 11 April 1940 (aged 33) Oxfordshire, United Kingdom
- Occupation: Jockey
- Spouse: Noreen Stella Barlow (m. 1936; div. 1938)

Horse racing career
- Sport: Horse racing

Major racing wins
- Irish Grand National - 1928: Champion Chase (1881-1950) - 1929, 1930; Champion Hurdle - 1930; Cheltenham Gold Cup - 1930; Grand National - 1930

Significant horses
- Easter Hero; Shaun Goilin

Tommy Cullinan (15 May 1906 - 11 April 1940) was an Irish National Hunt jockey of the inter-war period. In 1930 he became the first jockey to secure the unofficial Triple Crown of National Hunt racing in a single season, riding the winning horse to victory in each of the Grand National, the Cheltenham Gold Cup and the Champion Hurdle. It was a sporting feat that would remain unprecedented for 94 years.

== Early life ==
Thomas Brady Cullinan was born on 15 May 1906 in Brookville, Ennis, Co. Clare, Ireland, to Frederick George Cullinan and Frances Emily Brady-Browne. Cullinan's maternal uncle, Thomas Henry Brady-Browne, was Master of the Clare Hunt and an early influence on Cullinan's chosen career.

== Racing career ==
Cullinan began riding as an amateur jockey in the 1923 Irish National Hunt racing season aged 16. After steady progress he twice headed the list of winning amateur jockeys in both 1926 and 1927. This success afforded Cullinan the opportunity of a professional career in England beginning in December 1927, aged 21.

=== Early professional career (1927–1928) ===
On Boxing Day 1927, Cullinan took his first mount as a professional jockey at Leopardstown, Dublin. In the Tower Handicap Steeplechase Cullinan's new career got off to an auspicious start, riding Tiranogue to victory by half a length.

On 30 March 1928, Cullinan was given the mount of American horse Billy Barton for the Grand National at Aintree in Liverpool, the first of Cullinan's seven rides in the race. Having won both the Maryland Hunt Cup and the Virginia Gold Cup in 1926, Billy Barton had been shipped to England by owner Howard Bruce and stabled with trainer Aubrey Hastings. Under very heavy going, Easter Hero took an early lead only to fall on the first circuit. This triggered a pile-up from which just seven of the 42 starters emerged with seated jockeys. By the penultimate fence just three remained, including Cullinan on Billy Barton. When Great Span also fell, Billy Barton briefly led, only to fall himself at the final fence. That left Tipperary Tim, a 100/1 outsider, to take the victory. Cullinan remounted Billy Barton and was the only other Jockey to complete the course; the fewest recorded finishers in Grand National history.

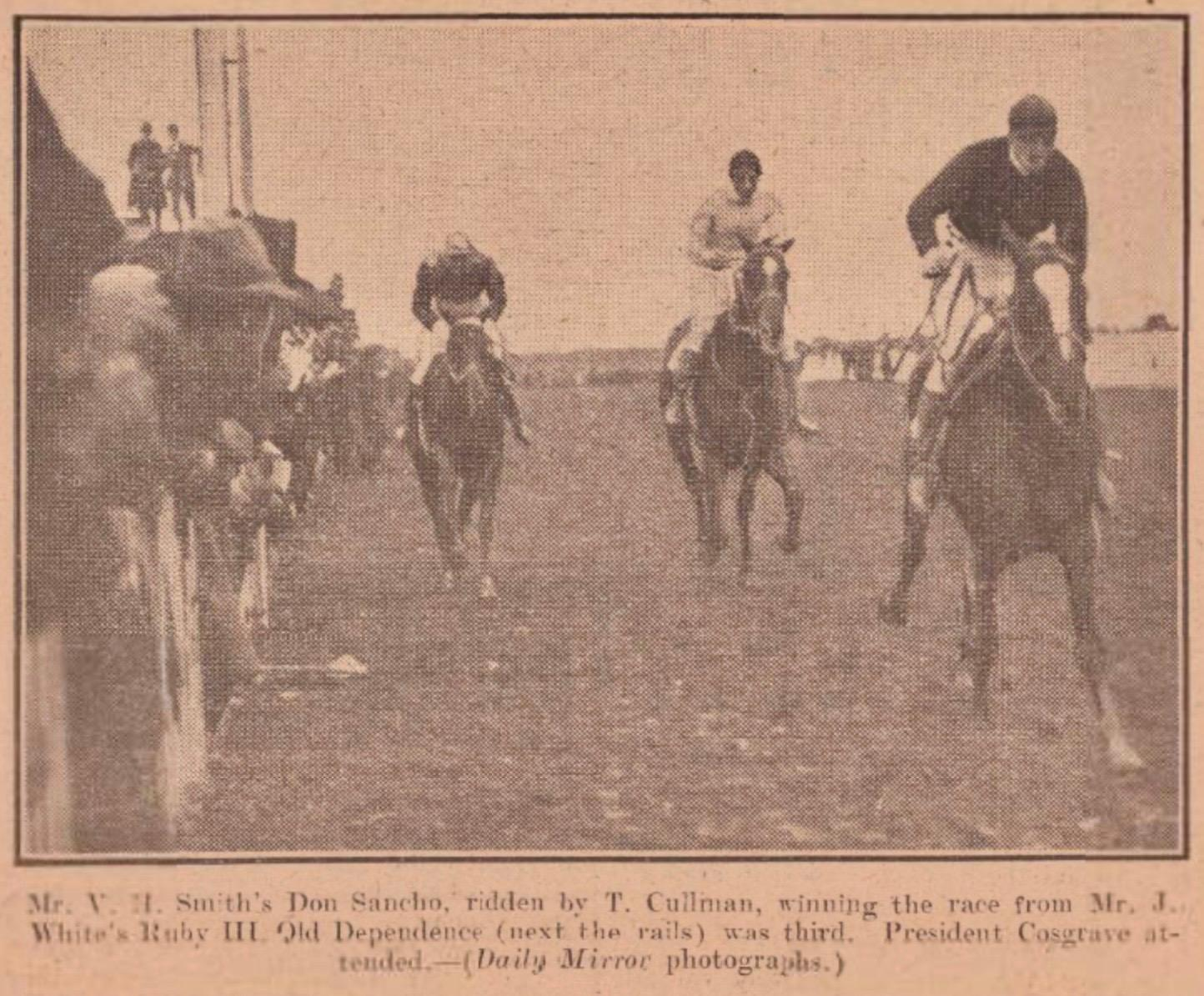
Cullinan riding Don Sancho to victory in the 1928 Irish Grand National

On 9 April 1928 Cullinan was partnered with Don Sancho for the Irish Grand National at Fairyhouse, Co. Meath. Trained by Fred Witherington, Don Sancho would provide Cullinan with the first big win of his career. Under heavy going, Don Sancho was ten lengths behind the two frontrunners - Ruby III and Old Dependence - before the last fence. However, on the final flat Don Sancho was able to pull alongside and then take the race by a length. Cullinan's "splendid jockeyship" was praised in the sporting press.

At the November 1928 meeting at Aintree, Cullinan was given the mount of Top Light, a 'one-eyed grey', for the Becher Steeplechase. Owned by Colonel D. C. Part, Top Light was trained by Aubrey Hastings, to whom Cullinan was now engaged as first jockey for the season. In foggy weather only two starters took to the course, with Beggar's End - the hot favourite - well beaten.

=== Cheltenham and Aintree success (1929) ===
Cullinan would ride two winners at the 1929 Cheltenham Festival for Hastings, both on 14 March. In the Newent Selling Handicap Steeplechase, his winning mount was Holiday Hall. Later the same day Cullinan rode Gallant Lover to victory in the Broadway Novices' Chase.

For the second year in succession, Cullinan took the mount of Billy Barton for the 1929 Grand National on 22 March. Amid a record 66 starters, Cullinan was unseated when Billy Barton fell at the 15th fence. Cullinan had better success at Aintree the following day in the Champion Chase, once again riding Top Light to victory, as he had in the Becher Steeplechase the previous November. In a competitive race, Top Light pulled away from Blaris in the run-in to take the win.

In October 1929 Cullinan was appointed first jockey to American owner, John Hay Whitney, whose horses were trained under Jack Anthony at Wantage. As a result, Cullinan was partnered with Easter Hero, winner of the 1929 Cheltenham Gold Cup, for both the 1930 edition of that race and the Grand National the following Spring.

=== Triple Crown season (1930) ===
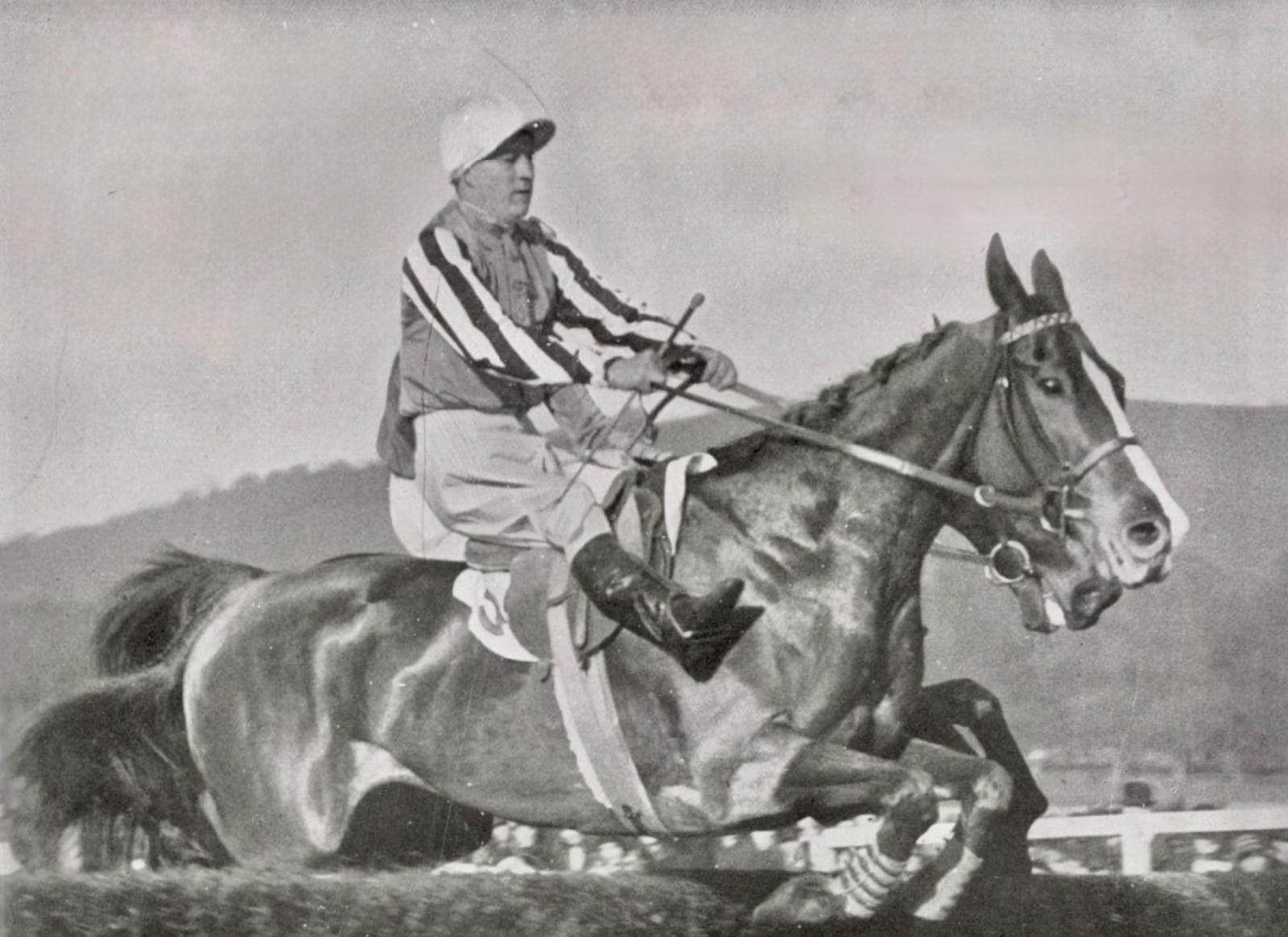
Cullinan en route to victory in the 1930 Cheltenham Gold Cup

At the 1930 Cheltenham Festival, on 11 March, Cullinan was first partnered with Brown Tony - another product of Anthony's stable - for the fourth annual running of the Champion Hurdle. Brown Tony took the win ahead of favourite Cleer Cash and Peertoi, though the three horses crossing the judge's line of vision almost together. The official verdict was a head win for Brown Tony.

On the same afternoon, Cullinan had the mount of Easter Hero for the Cheltenham Gold Cup. Easter Hero had been ridden by Dick Rees to a twenty-length victory in the 1929 race and would start as the 8/11 favourite. Surviving an error at the first fence, Easter Hero opened up a clear lead. However, by the penultimate fence Rees' 1930 mount Gib was neck and neck. But when Gib fell at the penultimate fence, Easter Hero was clear to take a twenty length victory, becoming the first horse to win back-to-back Gold Cups. Cullinan said of his victory that:

"Easter Hero was always running and jumping very well. When Gib fell he was beaten, and I think at the time he had no chance whatever. Easter Hero was full of running when he finished."

However, in claiming Gold Cup victory, Easter Hero sustained a tendon injury and had to be withdrawn from the 1930 Grand National at Aintree three days before the off. It meant that Cullinan would be unable to partner his intended mount, a race for which the duo had been the ante-post favourite after their success at Cheltenham.

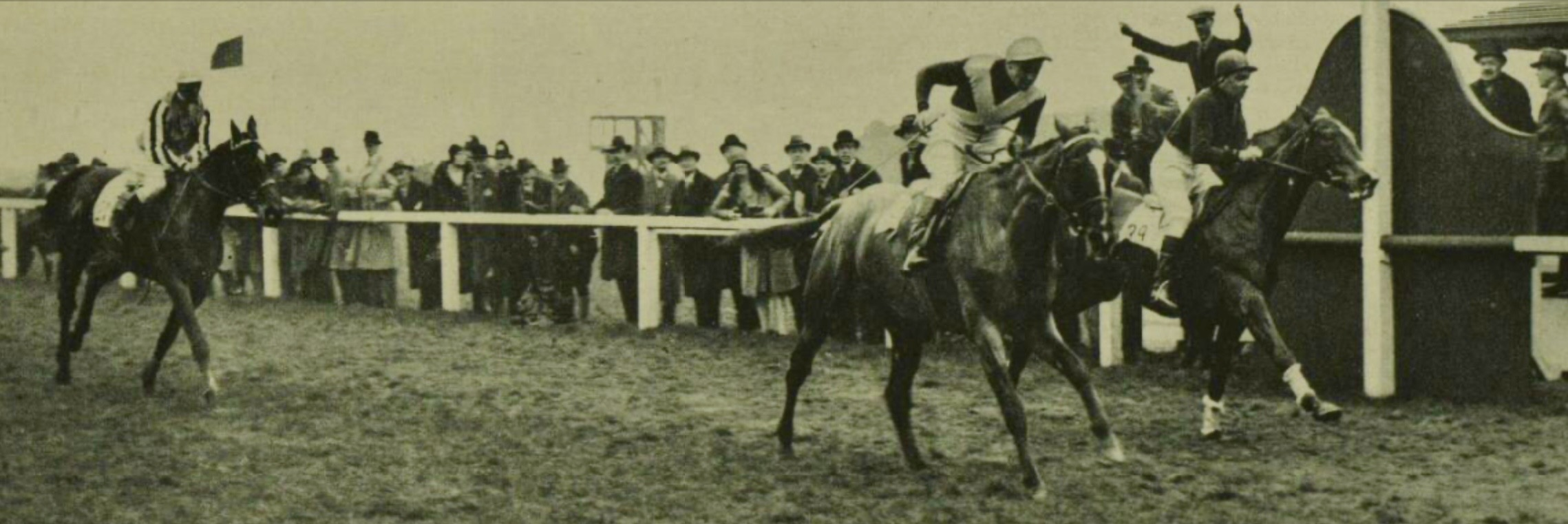
Cullinan crossing the finishing post to win the 1930 Grand National

Cullinan was instead belatedly partnered for the 1930 Grand National with Shaun Goilin, trained by Irish trainer Frank Hartigan at Weyhill, Hampshire for owner Walter H. Midwood. It meant Cullinan would now ride against Sir Lindsay, a horse from his retained stable. Shaun Goilin's lineage was unusually vague for a throughbred, sired by an unknown horse. Nevertheless, he was well backed and started the race as the 100/8 second favourite, his price shortened due to the thousands of Irish - including a number of Catholic priests - who romantically backed the combination of Irish horse, trainer and jockey. Despite good going only five of the 41 starters of the 1930 Grand National would stay the course and the result remains among the closest finishes on record. By the last fence it was a straight shootout between the leading three; Melleray's Belle, Sir Lindsay and Shaun Goilin. On the final flat a burst of speed enabled Shaun Goilin to outpace his two rivals and win by a neck in the unusually fast time of 9 minutes, 40 3/4 seconds (compared with an average for the time of over 10 minutes). So close was the finish that James Mason, riding Melleray's Belle, initially thought that he had won.

Interviewed after the race, Cullinan said that his horse had provided him with an "armchair journey". He went on to say:

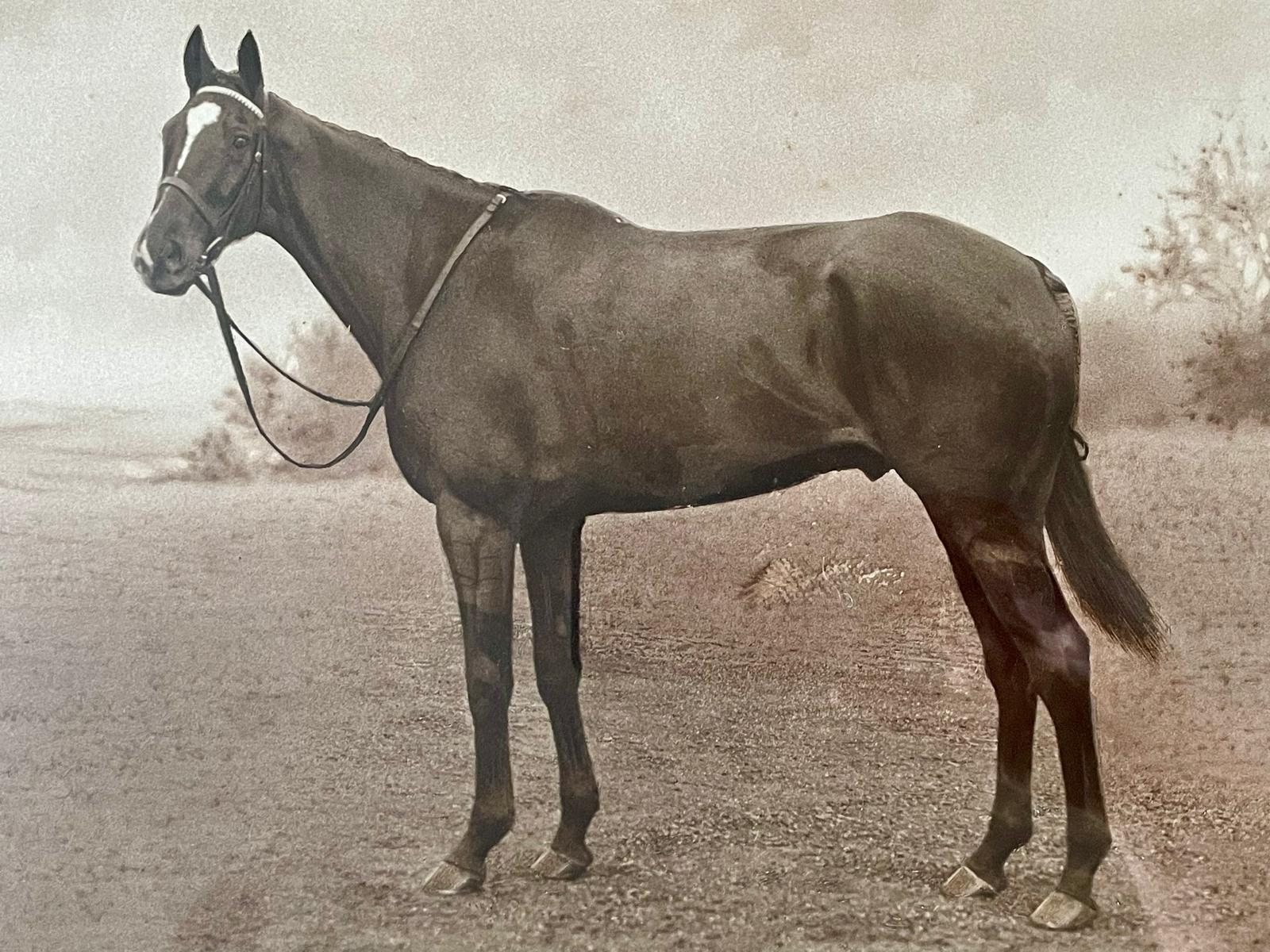
Shaun Goilin, Cullinan’s 1930 Grand National-winning mount

"[Shaun Goilin] is the greatest leaper I have ever ridden… Really, all I had to do was a bit of work at the finish. The horse did the rest. Not one single mistake did he make, and right from the start I was going on the bit. The horse gave me such a confident feeling that the only surprising thing was that I didn't win by a wider margin. I just let him run along in my hands all the time, having in mind that I must save a bit for the finish. Everything went well in the first circuit, and I kept a good place, in nice touch with the leaders. We jumped the water second and when we got into the country again I let Glangesia continue to give me a lead. The field gradually thinned down, but no matter what came along to join us in the front rank, I felt my horse going strongly, and I had no fear. There were three of us left to fight it out coming on to the racecourse. Here I got my first shock. Two fences from home I lost an iron and had to jump the last fence with only one foot in a stirrup. I did not recover it until after passing the winning post, but though my horse rolled a bit after landing on the flat, he came again and ran his race out as game as a pebble, though we both had to put in all we knew to land that wonderful prize."

Shaun Goilin's owner Midwood said of Cullinan that he "…rode an excellent race. He could not have done better, and great credit is due to him." Midwood apparently gave Cullinan a cheque for £1,000 out of the £5,000 prize money he received for the win.

Cullinan's feat of winning the Champion Hurdle, Cheltenham Gold Cup and Grand National in a single season - known as the unofficial Triple Crown of National Hunt racing - would not be repeated until 2024 when Paul Townend matched the achievement. Cullinan followed up the last of these wins by completing an Aintree double, riding Kakushin to victory in the Champion Steeplechase on the same afternoon - his second successive victory in the race having won on Top Light in 1929. As in the Grand National, Cullinan secured the win on the final flat, after jumping second at the final fence behind Colliery Band.

=== Later racing years (1931-1935) ===
Cullinan's final major race win also came at Aintree, at the November 1930 meeting. In the Becher Steeplechase, run on 4 November, Cullinan once again took the mount of Kakushin, riding him to victory. It was Cullinan's second victory in the race, having also scored a win on Top Light in 1928. Writing about Cullinan's victory in the Illustrated Sporting and Dramatic News, the columnist and pundit Rapier called him 'the best jockey today to ride over Liverpool'.

Cullinan took the mount of South Hill for the 1931 Grand National, falling at the 10th fence. For the 1932 Grand National Cullinan was partnered with Evolution, again a non-finisher falling at the 8th fence. Cullinan did not secure a mount for the 1933 race, but was partnered with Kilbuck in 1934, who ultimately refused at the 12th fence. Cullinan's final mount came in the 1935 Grand National on Trocadero, another non-finish when the jockey was unseated at the 11th fence.

Cullinan rode fewer races from 1935, concentrating on training, including ponies under Pony Turf Club Rules.

== Personal life ==
Cullinan married Noreen Stella Barlow on 23 March 1936. They were divorced in 1938.

== Death ==
At the outbreak of the Second World War Cullinan was enlisted as a gunner in the 35th Light Anti Aircraft Regiment, Royal Artillery. On 11 April 1940 Cullinan received a fatal gunshot wound at the Royal Air Force station in Oxfordshire where he was serving. He was 33 years old. At a private inquest the South Oxfordshire coroner, declared that it was not in the public interest that his verdict should be disclosed. It was said at the time that Cullinan was shot by a sentry guard having failed to identify himself on return to barracks. However, in reality Cullinan had committed suicide.

Cullinan is buried at Christ Church, Swindon.
