= St Dona's Church, Llanddona =

Coordinates: 53.305121°N 4.140838°W

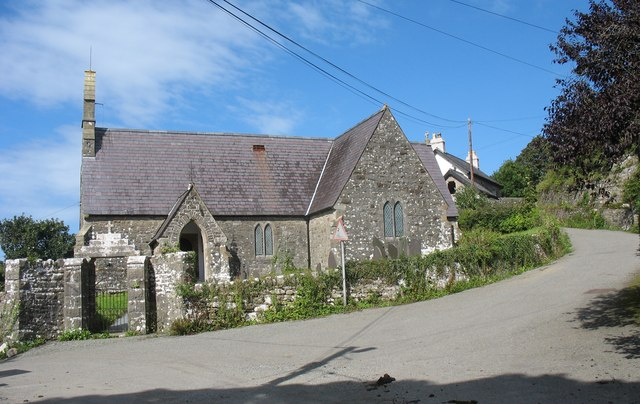
- The church seen from the south

- Location in Anglesey
- Location: Llanddona, Anglesey
- Country: Wales
- Denomination: Church in Wales

History
- Status: Parish church
- Founded: 610; present church built in 1873
- Dedication: St Dona

Architecture
- Functional status: Active
- Heritage designation: Grade II
- Designated: 30 January 1968
- Architect: Reverend Peter Jones (1873)
- Architectural type: Church
- Style: Gothic revival

Specifications
- Materials: Rubble masonry

Administration
- Province: Province of Wales
- Diocese: Diocese of Bangor
- Archdeaconry: Bangor
- Deanery: Tindaethwy and Menai
- Parish: Beaumaris with Llanddona and Llaniestyn

Clergy
- Rector: Reverend Neil Fairlamb

St Dona's Church, Llanddona (Welsh: [ɬanˈdɔna])) is a small 19th-century parish church in the village of Llanddona, in Anglesey, north Wales. The first church on this site was built in 610. The present building on the site dates from 1873, and was designed by the rector at the time. It reuses earlier material including a decorated 15th-century doorway and a 17th-century bell.

The church is still used for worship by the Church in Wales, and is one of seven churches in a combined parish. It is a Grade II listed building, a national designation given to "buildings of special interest, which warrant every effort being made to preserve them", in particular because it is regarded as "a simple late 19th-century essay in Gothic revival".

== History and location ==
St Dona's Church is on a steep hill near the coast on the eastern side of Anglesey, about 1 mile (1.6 km) from the village of Llanddona itself. The village takes its name from its parish church: the Welsh word llan originally meant "enclosure" and then "church", and "–ddona" is a modified form of the saint's name. St Dona's is surrounded by a churchyard, entered through a lychgate dated 1906 which bears a memorial to Henry Stanley, 3rd Baron Stanley of Alderley, "Patron and Benefactor of this church".

According to the 19th-century Anglesey historian Angharad Llwyd, a church was built here in 610, dedicated to St Dona, who lived on the sea shore nearby. The presence of a church here was recorded in the Norwich Taxation of 1254. Repairs were carried out in the 1840s: one 19th-century writer, Samuel Lewis, recorded that the internal state of St Dona's was "wretched in the extreme" until the rural dean at the time put it "into a state of creditable repair". In 1873, the rector (Peter Jones) had the church entirely rebuilt to his own design.

St Dona's is still in use for worship and belongs to the Church in Wales. It is one of seven churches in the combined benefice of Beaumaris with Llanddona and Llaniestyn. It is within the deanery of Tindaethwy and Menai, the archdeaconry of Bangor and the Diocese of Bangor. As of 2012, the rector is the Reverend Neil Fairlamb.

== Architecture and fittings ==
St Dona's is built of rubble masonry, dressed with freestone. The roof is made from slate, and has a bellcote made from stone at the west end. There is a stone cross finial at the east end of the roof. The church is entered through a porch on the south side which leads to a doorway dating from the 15th century. The rounded doorway is decorated with figures of a bird, a dog and a human face on the left, and a cherub on the right. Inside, the nave is separated from the chancel by a step, and the sanctuary is itself raised one step above the chancel. The roof timbers can be seen from inside. The window at the east end has three lights (vertical sections separated by mullions) topped with ogee curves, and is set within a pointed arch with an external hoodmould. It contains stained glass added in 1963, depicting Christ with sea in the background (centre), St Curig (left) and St Dona (right); above them are images of a lion, dove, lamb and eagle. A stone bearing the date 1566 has been set upside down into the wall above the east window. The other windows are plain and smaller, with one or two lights. The glass in the other windows has been described as "unusual opaque leaded glass".

The fittings are from the late 19th century, although the octagonal font (made of gritstone) is of uncertain date, possibly 14th century. The bell is dated 1647. A survey in 1937 by the Royal Commission on Ancient and Historical Monuments in Wales and Monmouthshire recorded the presence of an 18th-century communion table, an Elizabethan cover-paten dated 1574, and a silver cup dated 1769–1772.

== Churchyard ==
The churchyard contains two Commonwealth war graves. One is of Hugh Williams, a Royal Welsh Fusiliers soldier of World War I who died in 1918.

The other is the grave of Robert W. H. Everett, a Fleet Air Arm fighter pilot killed when his aircraft crashed on a nearby beach in 1942. Before World War II, Everett had been a jockey, and had ridden the winning horses in the 1929 Grand National and the 1934 Irish Grand National. In 1941, he had been awarded the DSO for shooting down a German Fw 200 Condor bomber.

== Assessment ==
St Dona's has national recognition and statutory protection from alteration as it has been designated as a Grade II listed building – the lowest of the three grades of listing, designating "buildings of special interest, which warrant every effort being made to preserve them". It was given this status on 30 January 1968, and has been listed because it is "a simple late 19th-century essay in Gothic revival". Cadw (the Welsh Government body responsible for the built heritage of Wales and the inclusion of Welsh buildings on the statutory lists) also notes that "its simple character" is "appropriate to its scale and site". A 2009 guide to the buildings of the region described St Dona's as "drably rebuilt".
