= 1933 Grand National =

English steeplechase horse race

- Grand National
- Location: Aintree Racecourse
- Date: 24 March 1933
- Winning horse: Kellsboro' Jack
- Starting price: 25/1
- Jockey: Dudley Williams
- Trainer: (Wales) Ivor Anthony
- Owner: (United States) F. Ambrose Clark
- Conditions: Good to firm

External videos
- Highlights of the 1933 Grand National (British Pathé)

The 1933 Grand National was the 92nd renewal of the Grand National horse race that took place at Aintree Racecourse near Liverpool, England, on 24 March 1933.

The steeplechase was won by Kellsboro' Jack, a 25/1 shot ridden by jockey Dudley Williams. The seven-year-old horse was trained by Ivor Anthony for American owner F. Ambrose Clark. Anthony later trained another National winner, Royal Mail, in 1937.

Really True came in second, Slater came in third, and Delaneige came in fourth. Thirty-four horses ran and all returned safely to the stables.

== Finishing order ==
Position	Name	Jockey	Age	Handicap (st-lb)	SP	Distance
1	Kellsboro' Jack	Dudley Williams	7	11-09	25/1	3 lengths
2	Really True	Mr Frank Furlong			66/1	
3	Slater	Mr M Barry			50/1	
4	Delaneige	John Moloney			20/1	
5	Alpine Hut	Mr Perry Harding			50/1	
6	Forbra	Tim Hamey			33/1	
7	Trocadero	M.Thery			100/1	
8	Southern Hero	Tom Isaac			50/1	
9	Master Orange	Captain Otho Prior-Palmer			100/1	
10	Colliery Brand	Gerald Hardy			40/1	
11	Egremont	Mr E.C.Paget			100/7	
12	Remus	Tommy Morgan			100/6	
13	Ruin	Harry Misa			50/1	
14	Near East	A.Robson			45/1	
15	Trouble Maker	Mr N.Laing			100/1	
16	Shaun Goilin	Mr Peter Cazalet			40/1	
17	Chadd's Ford	Mr Evan Williams			50/1	
18	Merriment IV	Lord Haddington			20/1	
19	Ballybrack	Mr G.Elliott			50/1	

== Non-finishers ==
Position/Fate	Name	Jockey	Age	Handicap (st-lb)	SP
Fell (1st)	Youtell	Mr Anthony Mildmay			100/1
	Dusty Foot	Mr George Bostwick			50/1
Unseated Rider (6th)	Society	Mr G.P.Shakerley			20/1
	Apostasy	Bob Lyall			100/1
	Heartbrake Hill	W.O'Grady			100/8
Brought Down (10th)	Annandale	Danny Morgan			20/1
Fell (10th)	Theras	George Owen			40/1
	Huic Holloa	Mr W.Ransom			50/1
Unseated Rider (17th)	Guiding Light	Lord Somerton			100/1
Fell (24th)	Golden Miller	Ted Leader			9/1
	Gregalach	Billy Parvin			10/1
Unseated Rider (25th)	Coup De Chapeau	Gerry Wilson			28/1
Fell (30th)	Pelorus Jack	Billy Stott			100/6
	Holmes	Cliff Beechener			50/1
	Ballyhanwood	J.H.Goswell			50/1
