= Frank Hartigan =

Irish horse trainer, winner of the 1000 Guineas and the Grand National

- Occupation: Horse Trainer
- Born: 31 December 1880; Ballincollig, County Cork, Ireland
- Died: 16 October 1952 (aged 71); London, United Kingdom

Major racing wins
- 1000 Guineas Stakes - 1915, 1919: Grand National - 1930

Significant horses
- Vaucluse; Roseway; Shaun Goilin

Francis Hartigan (1880–1952), known professionally as Frank Hartigan, was an Irish racehorse trainer whose stables in Weyhill, Hampshire, England, produced over 2,000 winners over fences, hurdles and on the flat between 1905 and 1952.

== Early life ==
Frank Hartigan was born in Ballincollig, County Cork, Ireland on 31 December 1880 to Michael Joseph Hartigan and Mary Moore. Hartigan's maternal grandfather, John Hubert Moore, was a trainer of horses in County Tipperary, while his maternal uncles, Garry Moore and Willie Moore were both successful jockeys and trainers in England.

Sometime in the 1890s, Hartigan left Ireland to join his uncles in England. He rode for seven years as a gentleman amateur jockey in England and France before turning professional in 1903.

== Racing career ==
In 1905, within 18 months of turning professional as a jockey, Hartigan began his career as a racehorse trainer, succeeding his uncle Willie Moore at his stables in Weyhill, Hampshire.

Hartigan twice trained the winner of the 1000 Guineas Stakes at Newmarket. In 1915 he won with Vaucluse, owned by the 5th Earl of Roseberry and ridden by Fred Rickaby Jr. Hartigan was again successful in 1919, winning with Roseway, owned by Sir Edward Hulton and ridden by Albert Whalley.

Hartigan's most famous success over fences came at the 1930 Grand National at Aintree, when Shaun Goilin, owned by Walter Midwood and ridden by Tommy Cullinan, won the race. In total, horses trained by Hartigan were entered 23 times for the Grand National between 1909 and 1947, placing seven times.

A special feature on Hartigan in the 9 February 1936 edition of the Weekly Dispatch described him as "the most hard-working and conscientious of racehorse trainers". By that point Hartigan had clocked up over 2,000 winners over fences, hurdles and on the flat.

== Death ==
Hartigan died on 16 October 1952 in London, aged 71.
