= 1935 Grand National =

English steeplechase horse race

- Grand National
- Location: Aintree Racecourse
- Date: 29 March 1935
- Winning horse: Reynoldstown
- Starting price: 22/1
- Jockey: (Republic of Ireland) Mr. Frank Furlong
- Trainer: (Republic of Ireland) Maj. Noel Furlong
- Owner: (Republic of Ireland) Maj. Noel Furlong
- Conditions: Good to firm

The 1935 Grand National was the 94th renewal of the Grand National horse race that took place at Aintree near Liverpool, England, on 29 March 1935.

The race was won by Reynoldstown, a 22/1 shot owned and trained by Major Noel Furlong, and ridden by his son, amateur jockey Frank Furlong. Reynoldstown followed up with a second consecutive victory one year later in the 1936 Grand National.

The favourite was Golden Miller who unseated his rider Gerry Wilson on the first circuit.

== Finishing order ==
Position	Name	Jockey	Age	Handicap (st-lb)	SP	Distance
1	Reynoldstown	Frank Furlong	8	11-04	22/1	3 Lengths
2	Blue Prince	Billy Parvin	7			
3	Thomond II	Billy Speck	9			
4	Lazy Boots	George Owen	9			
5	Uncle Batt	Tom Isaac	9			
6	Bachelor Prince	W.O'Grady	8			

== Non-finishers ==
Position/Fate	Name	Jockey	Age	Handicap (st-lb)	SP
Unseated Rider (11th)	Golden Miller	Gerry Wilson	8	12-7	
	Royal Ransom	Tim Hamey	8		
	Brienz	William Kidney	10		
	Southern Hero	Jack Fawcus	10		
Fell (6th)	Really True	Danny Morgan	11		
	Castle Irwell	Pete Bostwick	7		
	Ballybrack	Reg Tweedie	11		
	Brave Cry	Mr J.W.Lewis	13		
	Master Orange	Anthony Mildmay	10		
	Huic Holloa	J.Ward	10		
	Tapinois	Fred Gurney	7		
	Alexena	Peter Payne-Gallwey	9		
	Emancipator	Peter Cazalet	7		
	Trocadero	Tommy Cullinan	11		
	Southern Hue	P Powell	11		
	Red Park	Patrick Fitzgerald	9		
	Theras	Tommy Carey	10		
	Jimmy James	Frenchie Nicholson	8		
	Slater	F.Maxwell	10		
	Princess Mir	Mr D.Jackson	10		
	Fouquet	Eric Brown	7		
