= 1936 Grand National =

English steeplechase horse race

- Grand National
- Location: Aintree Racecourse
- Date: 27 March 1936
- Winning horse: Reynoldstown
- Starting price: 10/1
- Jockey: (England) Mr. Fulke Walwyn
- Trainer: (Republic of Ireland) Maj. Noel Furlong
- Owner: (Republic of Ireland) Maj. Noel Furlong
- Conditions: Good

External videos
- Highlights of the 1936 Grand National (British Pathé)

The 1936 Grand National was the 95th renewal of the Grand National horse race that took place at Aintree near Liverpool, England, on 27 March 1936.

Reynoldstown, a 10/1 shot owned and trained by Major Noel Furlong and ridden by amateur jockey Fulke Walwyn, won the race for the second year in a row after being left clear by Davy Jones running out at the last fence.

At the 17th fence, Avenger incurred a cervical fracture in a fall and was euthanised.

== Finishing order ==
Position	Name	Jockey	Age	Handicap (st-lb)	SP	Distance
1	Reynoldstown	Fulke Walwyn	9	12-02	10/1	12 Lengths
2	Ego	Harry Llewellyn			50/1	6 Lengths
3	Bachelor Prince	Jack Fawcus			66/1	
4	Crown Prince	Ronald Strutt			66/1	
5	Inversible	S.McGrath			40/1	
6	Provocative	Eric Brown			33/1	
7	Castle Irwell	George Bostwick			8/1	
8	Double Crossed	Danny Morgan			20/1	
9	Moorland View	Mr E.C.Paget			66/1	
10	Comedian	G.Turner			100/1	

== Non-finishers ==
Position/Fate	Name	Jockey	Age	Handicap (st-lb)	SP
	Castle View	George Owen			100/1
Fell (11th)	Lazy Boots	Roger Moseley			25/1
	Oeil de Boeuf	Matthew Feakes			100/1
	The Boy in Blue	Mr P.Vaux			100/1
Fell (11th)	Brienz	Tim Hamey			40/1
Fell (8th)	Delaneige	Frenchie Nicholson			25/1
	Royal Ransom	Hywell Jones			33/1
	Blue Prince	Billy Parvin			20/1
	Zag	Otho Prior-Palmer			100/1
	D'Eyncourt	Patrick Carey			50/1
	Uncle Batt	Thomas McNeill			66/1
	Persian Sun	E.Vianll			66/1
	Hillsbrook	W.O'Grady			40/1
	Evasio Mon	Mr T.Holland-Martin			100/1
	Rod And Gun	Mr L.Stoddard			100/1
	Golden Miller	Evan Williams			5/1
Fell (17th)	Avenger	Fred Rimell			100/30
	Pencraik	John Lynn Jnr			100/1
	Lynton	Charles Hook			100/1
	Blaze	Keith Piggott			100/1
	Buckthorn	Perry Harding			40/1
	Kiltoi	Thomas F Carey			66/1
	Emancipator	Peter Cazalet			20/1
	Keen Blade	Tommy Elder			100/7
Ran Out (30th)	Davy Jones	Anthony Mildmay			100/1
