= Vaucluse (horse) =

British Thoroughbred racehorse

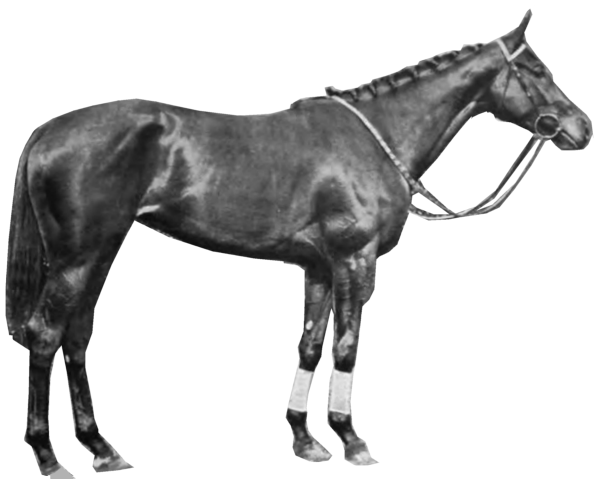
- Vaucluse in 1915.
- Sire: Dark Ronald
- Grandsire: Bay Ronald
- Dam: Valve
- Damsire: Velasquez
- Sex: Mare
- Foaled: 1912
- Country: United Kingdom
- Colour: Bay
- Breeder: Archibald Primrose, 5th Earl of Rosebery
- Owner: 5th Earl of Rosebery
- Trainer: Frank Hartigan
- Record: 5: 1-2-0

Major wins
- 1000 Guineas (1915)

Vaucluse (1912–1928) was a British Thoroughbred racehorse and broodmare. In a brief racing career which consisted of five races in three seasons she finished second on her only start as a juvenile, fell on her three-year-old debut and then recorded her first and only victory when taking the 1000 Guineas. She ran poorly when favourite for the Oaks Stakes and finished second on her only subsequent start. After her retirement from racing she had considerable influence as a broodmare.

== Background ==
Vaucluse was a bay mare bred and owned by Archibald Primrose, 5th Earl of Rosebery. She was trained throughout her racing career by Frank Hartigan at Weyhill in Hampshire.

Her sire Dark Ronald won the Royal Hunt Cup and Princess of Wales's Stakes in 1909 and went on to become a very successful breeding stallion. The best of his other foals was probably Son-in-Law. Vaucluse's dam Valve was a half-sister to Cicero and a close relative of Ladas. Valve also produced Verve, who was the female-line ancestor of numerous major winners including Greek Money, Pentire, Shirley Heights, Sanglamore and Divine Proportions.

Vaucluse's racing career took place during World War I. Many racecourses were closed for the duration of the conflict and all five of traditional British Classic Races were run at Newmarket.

== Racing career ==
=== 1914: two-year-old season ===
On her first and only appearance as a two-year-old in 1914, Vaucluse finished second to the colt Roseland in the Fitzwilliam Stakes at Newmarket Racecourse.

=== 1915: three-year-old season ===
On her first run as a three-year-old Vaucluse contested the Tudor Plate at Sandown Park but slipped up and fell in a race that she looked likely to win.

On 30 April Vaucluse started the 5/2 favourite in a fifteen-runner field for the 103rd running of the 1000 Guineas over the Rowley Mile course. Ridden by Fred Rickaby, she took the lead soon after the start and won by three quarters of a length from Silver Tag, with a length and a half back to Bright in third place.

With Rickaby again in the saddle, Vaucluse started 11/10 favourite for the New Oaks over one and a half miles at Newmarket on 17 June but finished unplaced behind the outsider Snow Marten who won "in a canter".

=== 1916: four-year-old season ===
After an absence of almost ten months, Vaucluse returned to the track for one final race in April 1916, and finished second by a neck to Cerval in the Spring Cup at Newbury Racecourse.

== Assessment and honours ==
In their book, A Century of Champions, based on the Timeform rating system, John Randall and Tony Morris rated Vaucluse an "inferior" winner of the 1000 Guineas.

== Breeding record ==
Vaucluse was retired from racing to become a broodmare. She produced at least five foals between 1918 and 1926:

- Forerunner, a bay colt, foaled in 1918, sired by Chaucer. Winner.
- High Force, bay colt, 1919, by Tracery
- Lake Leman, bay filly, 1920, by Tracery. Winner. Grand-dam of Hippius (Champion Stakes).
- Bongrace, bay filly, 1923, by Spion Kop. Won Doncaster Cup and Jockey Club Cup. Female-line ancestor of Blushing John, Royal Diamond, Homeless Songs and Hurricane Run.
- Athenais, filly, 1926, by Hurry On

Vaucluse died in 1928.

== Pedigree ==
Pedigree of Vaucluse (GB), bay mare, 1912
Sire Dark Ronald (GB) 1905	Bay Ronald (GB); 1893	Hampton	Lord Clifden
Sire Dark Ronald (GB) 1905	Bay Ronald (GB); 1893	Hampton	Lady Langden
Sire Dark Ronald (GB) 1905	Bay Ronald (GB); 1893	Black Duchess	Galliard
Sire Dark Ronald (GB) 1905	Bay Ronald (GB); 1893	Black Duchess	Black Corrie
Sire Dark Ronald (GB) 1905	Darkie (GB); 1889	Thurio	Cremorne
Sire Dark Ronald (GB) 1905	Darkie (GB); 1889	Thurio	Verona
Sire Dark Ronald (GB) 1905	Darkie (GB); 1889	Insignia	Blair Athol
Sire Dark Ronald (GB) 1905	Darkie (GB); 1889	Insignia	Decoration
Dam Valve (GB) 1900	Velasquez (GB); 1894	Donovan	Galopin
Dam Valve (GB) 1900	Velasquez (GB); 1894	Donovan	Mowerina (DEN)
Dam Valve (GB) 1900	Velasquez (GB); 1894	Vista	Macaroni
Dam Valve (GB) 1900	Velasquez (GB); 1894	Vista	Verdure
Dam Valve (GB) 1900	Gas (GB); 1892	Ayrshire	Hampton
Dam Valve (GB) 1900	Gas (GB); 1892	Ayrshire	Atalanta
Dam Valve (GB) 1900	Gas (GB); 1892	Illuminata	Rosicrucian
Dam Valve (GB) 1900	Gas (GB); 1892	Illuminata	Paraffin (Family 1-l)

- Vaucluse was inbred 3 × 4 to Hampton, meaning that this stallion appears in both the third and fourth generations of her pedigree.
