= Robert W. H. Everett =

British jockey and pilot (1901–1942)

Robert Everett
Personal information
- Born: 29 May 1901 Tenterfield, New South Wales, Australia
- Died: 20 January 1942 (aged 40) Llanddona, Anglesey, Wales
- Resting place: St Dona's Church, Llanddona

Horse racing career
- Sport: Horse racing

Major racing wins
- 1929 Grand National; 1934 Irish Grand National

Significant horses
- Gregalach
- Military career
- Allegiance: United Kingdom
- Branch: Royal Navy
- Service years: 1940–1942
- Rank: Lieutenant
- Unit: Fleet Air Arm
- Conflicts: Second World War
- Awards: DSO

Robert William Hanmer Everett DSO (29 May 1901 – 26 January 1942) was a British jockey and a Royal Navy Volunteer Reserve pilot during the Second World War. In 1929, he won the Grand National on Gregalach. In 1941, as a Fleet Air Arm pilot, he achieved the first "kill" by a rocket-launched fighter, shooting down a long-range Focke-Wulf Fw 200 Condor over the Atlantic. For this hazardous success, he was awarded the Distinguished Service Order (DSO). Knowledge of Everett's life is fragmentary, with just a few notable events.

== Early life ==
Everett was born to on 29 May 1901 in Tenterfield, New South Wales, Australia. His parents were Lt. Colonel William Frank Everett and Charlotte Everett of Chelsea. In 1915 he attended the Royal Naval College, Osborne, then served for two years as a Midshipman in the Royal Navy during World War 1. After the war, he working as a farmer in South Africa, before moving to the United Kingdom in 1927 to become a National Hunt jockey.

In 1929, he rode "Gregalach" in the Grand National at Aintree after the jockey engaged to ride him was injured in a fall. The horse was marked down by bookmakers as a 100-1 outsider, yet he won, beating the favourite, "Easter Hero", by six lengths. This race had the largest Grand National field ever and Everett was praised for his horsemanship over heavy ground. Later, in 1934, he won the Irish Grand National at Fairyhouse, this time on "Poolgowran".

At the same time, Everett had become an amateur pilot and jointly owned, with his father, a De Havilland Puss Moth, a relatively high-performance aircraft of its day. In 1934, with another Australian, Jimmy Melrose, he entered the MacRobertson Air Race (or the Melbourne Centenary Air Race) to Melbourne from Mildenhall, in England. This was successfully completed in 120 flying hours, despite landing at Darwin with empty fuel tanks.

== Service career ==
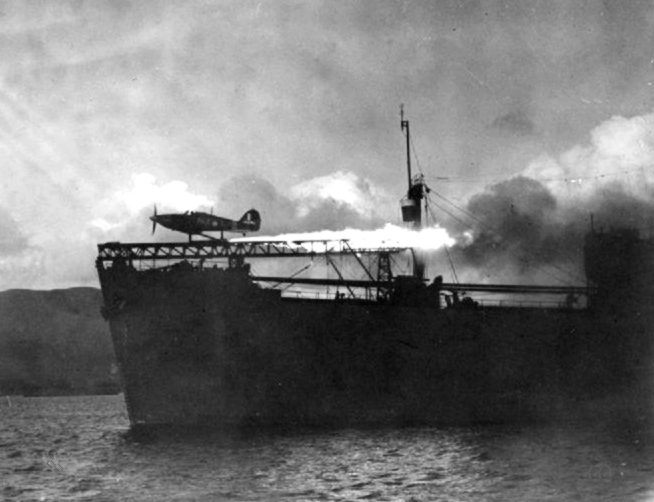
Test launch of a Hurricane from a CAM ship at Greenock, Scotland, 31 May 1941

Everett joined the Royal Naval Volunteer Reserve and Fleet Air Arm in October 1940 and served with 760 Naval Air Squadron at HMS Heron, Yeovilton. Later he volunteered for 804 Naval Air Squadron, which for a time supplied pilots for fighter catapult ships and CAM ships. While he was on HMS Maplin, a Condor was sighted on 1 August 1941 and Everett's Hawker Hurricane was launched. After a hard fight, the Condor was shot down with Everett's last shots ("By this time I had reached the starboard bow and three machine guns opened up as well as the forward cannon. I did a quick turn to port and opened up just abaft the beam I fired five second burst at this range and my guns were empty"). He managed to ditch near to HMS Wanderer which was escorting the nearby convoy, SL.81. Everett was awarded the DSO for this action.

== Death ==
Everett died on active service on 26 January 1942. He was flying a Hurricane from Belfast to Abingdon when it came down in shallow water close to the beach at Llanddona, Anglesey, Wales. Witnesses reported the aircraft seemed to be suffering from engine problems. The aircraft wreck was soon recovered but the cockpit was empty. Everett's body was washed ashore several months later; a post-mortem revealed he had drowned.

He is buried close to the scene of the crash, in St Dona's Church, Llanddona.
