= Easter Hero =

Irish-bred racehorse

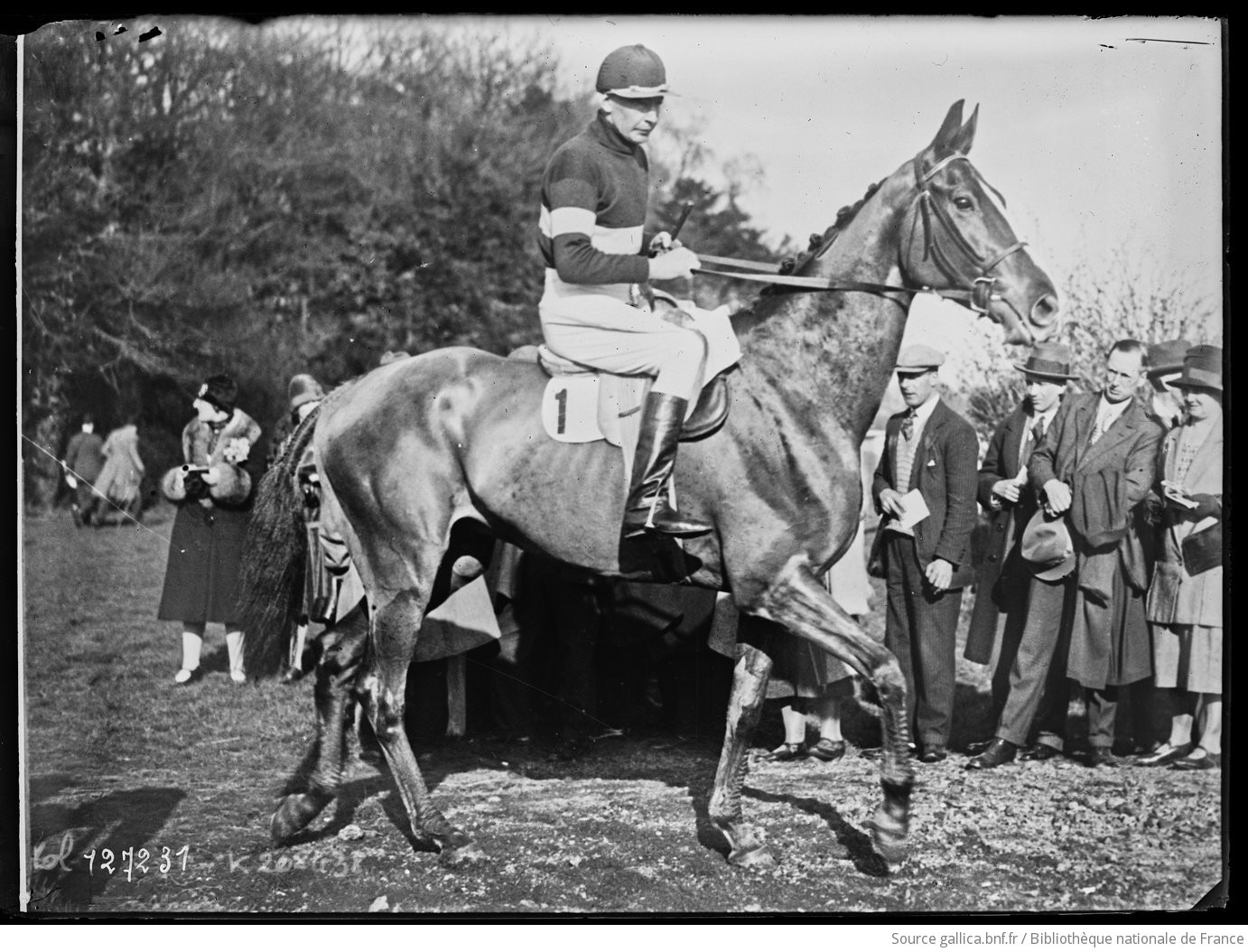
- 3 March 1928, Kempton Park
- Sire: My Prince
- Grandsire: Marcovil
- Dam: Easter Week
- Damsire: Outbreak
- Sex: Gelding
- Foaled: 1920
- Country: (Republic of Ireland) Ireland
- Colour: Chestnut
- Breeder: Larry King
- Owner: Larry King; JHC Bartholomew; Frank Barbour; Alfred Loewenstein; Jock Whitney
- Trainer: Larry King; William Jones; Alfred Bickley; Thomas Pardy; Jack Anthony
- Record: 35: 18–6–0 (steeplechases)

Major wins
- Becher Chase (1927); Coventry Chase (1928); Prix des Drags (1928); Cheltenham Gold Cup (1929, 1930); Champion Chase (1931)

Easter Hero (1920–1948) was an Irish-bred British-trained racehorse who won the Cheltenham Gold Cup in 1929 and 1930 and made three unsuccessful attempts to win the Grand National. He showed little early promise and was passed from owner to owner before beginning to display ability in 1927. Wins in the Becher Chase and the Coventry Chase established him as a leading steeplechaser and he was bought by Alfred Loewenstein with the aim of winning the National. In his first attempt at the race he fell at the eighth and brought the field to a virtual halt after becoming trapped in the ditch in front of the fence.

After Loewenstein's mysterious death Easter Hero was bought by the American John Hay Whitney and in 1929 he won his first Cheltenham Gold Cup by twenty lengths. In the 1929 Grand National he produced one of the best performances in the history of the race, finishing second under a weight of 175 pounds despite being hampered in the closing stages by a twisted plate. He won a second Gold Cup in 1930 but sustained an injury in doing so and missed that year's National. In his final season he won four races but fell in the Grand National. He was then retired and lived at his owner's establishments in the United States before dying in 1948.

== Background ==
Eastern Hero was a light-framed chestnut gelding with a white blaze who stood 16.1 hands high. He was bred in Curragha, Ashbourne, County Meath, Ireland, by Larry King, a local farmer who named the horse in honour of the Easter Rising. Easter Hero was sired by My Prince a high-class performer on the flat who became a very successful sire of National Hunt horses. His other offspring included the Cheltenham Gold Cup winner Prince Regent and the Grand National winners Reynoldstown, Gregalach and Royal Mail. Easter Hero's dam, Easter Week, was not a Thoroughbred, being a descendant of the mare Arab Maid, whose pedigree on her mother's side was uncertain. Arab Maid's other descendants have included Morley Street and Granville Again.

== Racing career ==
=== Early career ===
After running poorly in a race at Baldoyle, Easter Hero was sold by King to JHC Bartholomew, a British owner and trainer who campaigned the young horse extensively but with limited success. As a five-year-old he won a race at Manchester Racecourse and finished unplaced in the Irish Grand National. Bartholomew then sold the horse for £500 to Frank Barbour.

=== 1927/28 National Hunt season ===
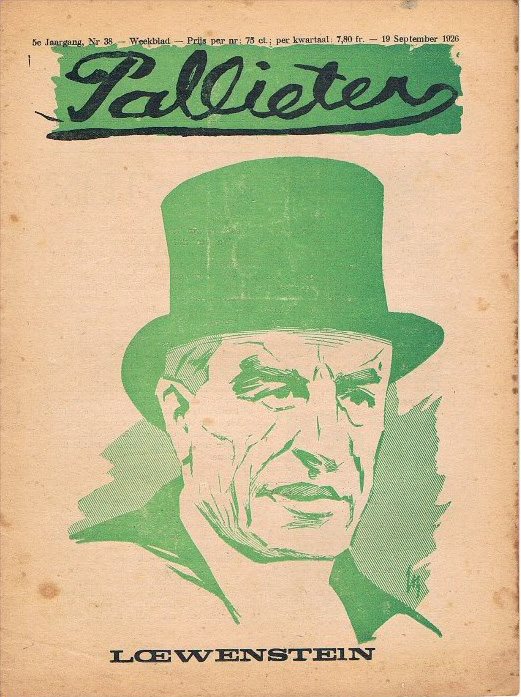
Alfred Loewenstein, Easter Hero's fourth owner depicted in 1926

In the 1927/28 National Hunt season, Easter Hero emerged as a top-class steeplechaser with a series of wins including the Becher Chase at Aintree and a handicap race at Kempton. His style of racing seldom varied: he took the lead at the start, opened up a big lead, and was rarely challenged. In February, he was tried over three and a half miles in the Coventry Chase at Kempton and won under a weight of 173 pounds. He looked likely to start favourite for the Cheltenham Gold Cup but was sold before the race to Belgian financier Alfred Loewenstein, who opted to miss the race. It later transpired that Loewenstein had paid £7000 for the gelding, with an agreement to pay an additional £3000 if he won that year's Grand National.

At Aintree Racecourse on 30 March, Easter Hero, carrying 173 pounds, started the 100/7 fourth favourite in a field of forty-two runners for the 1928 Grand National. He led the field at a strong pace until he reached the Canal Turn, where he misjudged the ditch on the take-off side and landed on top of the fence before sliding back into the ditch. With the horse left trapped in the ditch, the other runners took evasive action, leading to a pile-up that brought the field to a stand-still. Largely as a result of the incident, only two horses completed the course, with the victory going to 100/1 outsider Tipperary Tim. In the summer of 1928, Easter Hero was sent to France and won the Prix des Drags at Auteuil Hippodrome.

=== 1928/29 National Hunt season ===
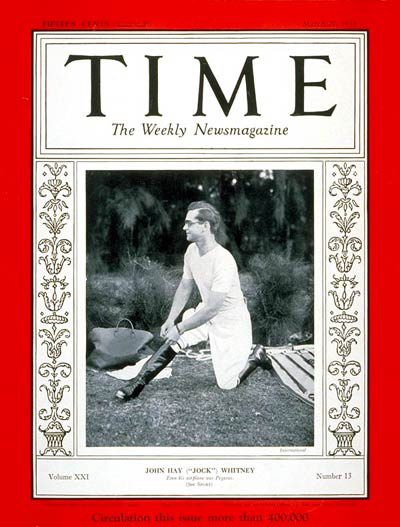
Jock Whitney, Easter Hero's fifth and final owner on the cover of Time (27 March 1933)

Alfred Lowenstein was declared dead after disappearing from an aircraft over the North Sea on 4 July 1928. His horses were put up for sale and Easter Hero was bought by the American John Hay "Jock" Whitney, in a reported £20,000 deal which also included the Grand Steeplechase de Paris winner Maguelonne. Whitney sent him to be trained by Jack Anthony, a former champion jockey, at Letcombe Regis. In the early part of the season Easter Hero won four times in hurdle races. Cold, frosty weather in early 1929 led to most National Hunt meetings being abandoned in February and the Cheltenham Festival was postponed for a week. Anthony reportedly kept Easter Hero fit by cantering him on the beach at Tenby. In the Gold Cup he was ridden by Welsh champion jockey Dick Rees and started the 7/4 favourite in a ten-runner field with his rivals including Koko (winner in 1926 and third in 1928), Grakle (runner-up in 1927) and Brights Boy (third under top weight in the 1927 Grand National). Rees sent him straight into the lead and was thirty lengths clear with a circuit to go. None of his opponents ever threatened to mount a challenge and he won by twenty lengths from Lloydie, with Grakle two lengths back in third place. The Sporting Life commented "Easter Hero, in cantering away with the Cheltenham Gold Cup yesterday, gave one of the most sparkling exhibitions of clean, quick jumping and resolute galloping ever seen on this particular course".

In the Grand National Easter Hero carried top weight of 175 pounds and started the 9/1 favourite in a record field of sixty-six runners. As in the previous year he led soon after the start and set a strong pace but on this occasion the obstacles gave him no problems and he held a clear advantage from the fourth fence. At some point after clearing Valentine's Brook on the second circuit however he partially dislodged and twisted a racing plate which hampered his progress from then on. He was still in front at the second last but was overtaken and beaten six lengths into second place by Gregalach. After the race the runner-up was given a reception normally accorded to winners as he was mobbed by admirers, some of whom attempted to pull hairs from his tail as souvenirs. "Augur" writing in the Sporting Life called Easter Hero's run "one of the best performances in the history of the race". He also defended the jockey against criticisms that he had made "too much use" of the favourite, pointing out that the horse was at his best when allowed to race from the front.

Easter Hero was sent to France in summer and started favourite for the Grand Steeplechase de Paris. He built up his customary big lead but was pulled up by his jockey after sustaining a back injury at the water jump.

=== 1929/30 National Hunt season ===
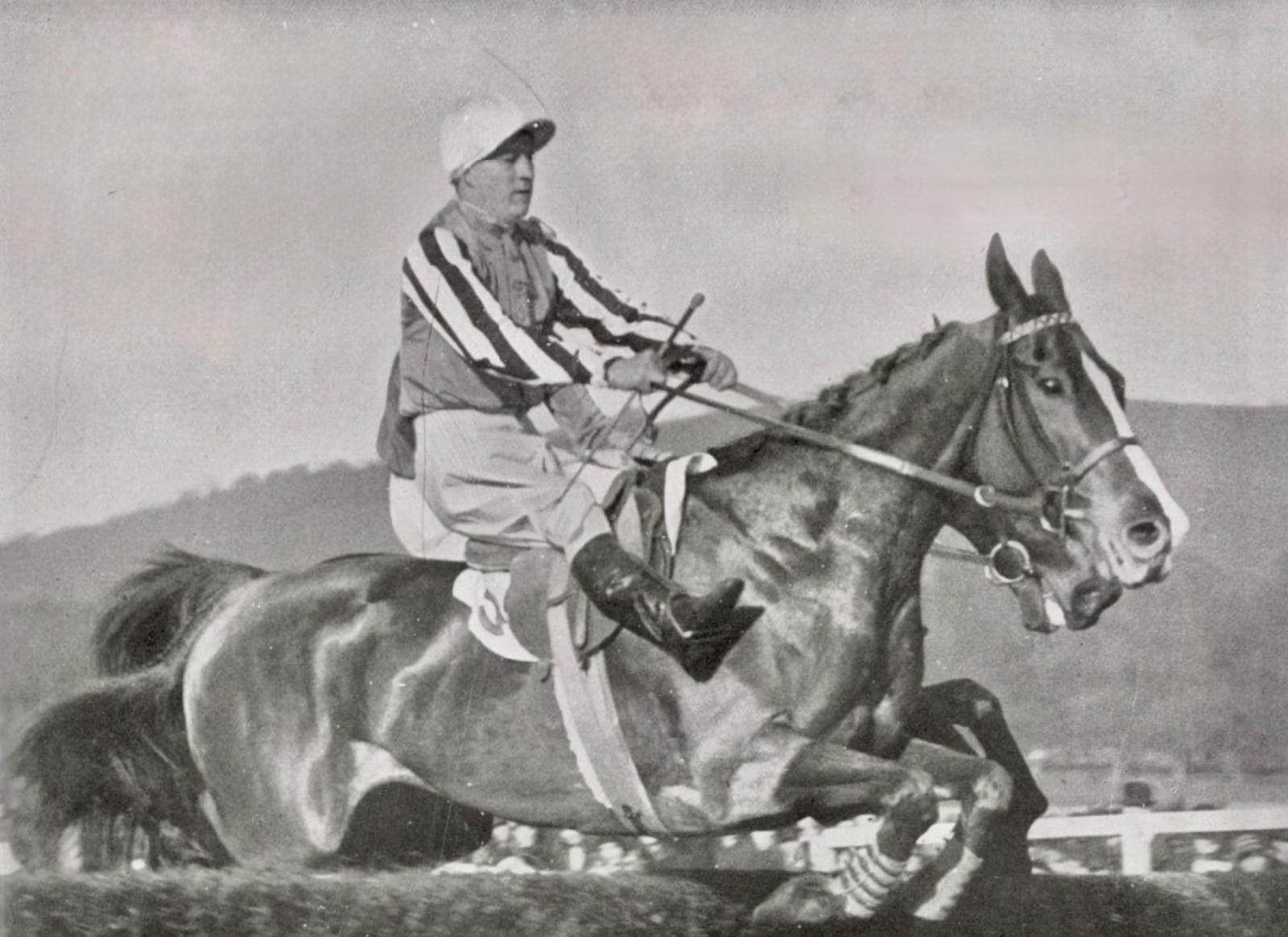
Easter Hero, ridden by Tommy Cullinan, en route to victory in the 1930 Cheltenham Gold Cup

Easter Hero was given a lengthy break before returning for the 1929/30 National Hunt Season. He recorded easy wins in the Penkridge Chase at Wolverhampton in January and a chase at Leicester in the same month before attempting to repeat his 1929 success in the Gold Cup. He faced a challenge from Gib, an improving seven-year-old who had been unbeaten in his last seven races including a decisive victory over Gregalach. Easter Hero, under the mount of Irish jockey Tommy Cullinan, started the 8/11 favourite ahead of Gib (ridden by Easter Hero's 1929 jockey, Dick Rees) on 13/8 whilst the only other two runners were Grakle on 10/1 and the 50/1 outsider Danzelon. As usual Easter Hero set off in front and survived alarming errors at the first two fences to open up a clear lead. Danzelon fell early and Grakle was soon struggling, but Gib stayed in contention and steadily reduced the favourite's lead. Easter Hero and Gib came to the second last together, but the younger horse made a bad mistake, unseated Rees, and allowed the favourite to come home unchallenged. Grakle was twenty lengths away in second whilst Gib was remounted and finished the course to take third place.

Immediately after the race, Cullinan said of his horse:

"Easter Hero was always running and jumping very well. When Gib fell he was beaten, and I think at the time he had no chance whatever. Easter Hero was full of running when he finished."

However, in claiming victory at Cheltenham, Easter Hero sustained a tendon injury and was unable to contest the Grand National later that month, a race for which he had been the ante-post favourite. Cullinan had already been slated for Easter Hero's mount, but what appeared to be an unlucky break for the jockey in reality proved highly fortuitous; Cullinan went on to ride Shaun Goilin to victory at Aintree.

=== 1930/31 National Hunt season ===
After an absence of over nine months, Easter Hero returned to win the Wigston Chase at Leicester in December 1930 and then took the Mole Handicap chase at Sandown Park in January, beating the 1927 Champion Hurdler Blaris by eight lengths. He was aimed at the Grand National and was strongly fancied despite a surprise defeat in the Buckhurst Chase at Lingfield Park Racecourse when he failed by a head to concede 23 pounds to Desert Chief. He was then denied a chance to complete a hat-trick of Gold Cup wins when the 1931 Cheltenham Festival was abandoned. In the 1931 Grand National he was ridden by Rees and started the 5/1 favourite against forty-one rivals under a weight of 175 pounds. He was going well until Becher's Brook on the second circuit when he fell after being hampered by a loose horse and a falling opponent. Despite his exertions he turned out for the Champion Chase over two miles seven furlongs on the following day in which he dead-heated with the French horse Coup de Chapeau. Taking the view that the horse was now past his prime, Whitney opted to retire him.

== Retirement ==
After the end of his racing career, Easter Hero was sent to the United States was used by Whitney as a hunter in Virginia before being retired to Whitney's stud farm in Kentucky. He died on February 10, 1948, at the age of 28 and was buried at Whitney's equine cemetery at Greentree.

== Assessment and honours ==
In their book, A Century of Champions, based on the Timeform rating system, John Randall and Tony Morris rated Easter Hero a "great" Gold Cup winner and the best British steeplechaser of the 20th century. They also described his second-place finish in the 1929 Grand National as "the greatest single performance in the history" of the race.

== Pedigree ==
Pedigree of Easter Hero (IRE), chestnut gelding, 1920
Sire My Prince (GB) 1911	Marcovil (GB); 1903	Marco	Barcaldine
Sire My Prince (GB) 1911	Marcovil (GB); 1903	Marco	Novitiate
Sire My Prince (GB) 1911	Marcovil (GB); 1903	Lady Villikins	Hagioscope
Sire My Prince (GB) 1911	Marcovil (GB); 1903	Lady Villikins	Dinah
Sire My Prince (GB) 1911	Salvaich (GB); 1896	St Simon	Galopin
Sire My Prince (GB) 1911	Salvaich (GB); 1896	St Simon	St Angela
Sire My Prince (GB) 1911	Salvaich (GB); 1896	Muirninn	Scottish Chief
Sire My Prince (GB) 1911	Salvaich (GB); 1896	Muirninn	Violet
Dam Easter Week (IRE) 1914	Outbreak (GB); 1902	Le Var	Isonomy
Dam Easter Week (IRE) 1914	Outbreak (GB); 1902	Le Var	St Marguerite
Dam Easter Week (IRE) 1914	Outbreak (GB); 1902	Disruption	Discord
Dam Easter Week (IRE) 1914	Outbreak (GB); 1902	Disruption	Mattie
Dam Easter Week (IRE) 1914	Enthusiast mare (GB); 1901	Enthusiast	Sterling
Dam Easter Week (IRE) 1914	Enthusiast mare (GB); 1901	Enthusiast	Cherry Duchess
Dam Easter Week (IRE) 1914	Enthusiast mare (GB); 1901	Rob Roy mare	Rob Roy
Dam Easter Week (IRE) 1914	Enthusiast mare (GB); 1901	Rob Roy mare	Sultana (Arab Maid family)
