= Shaun Goilin =

Grand National winning racehorse

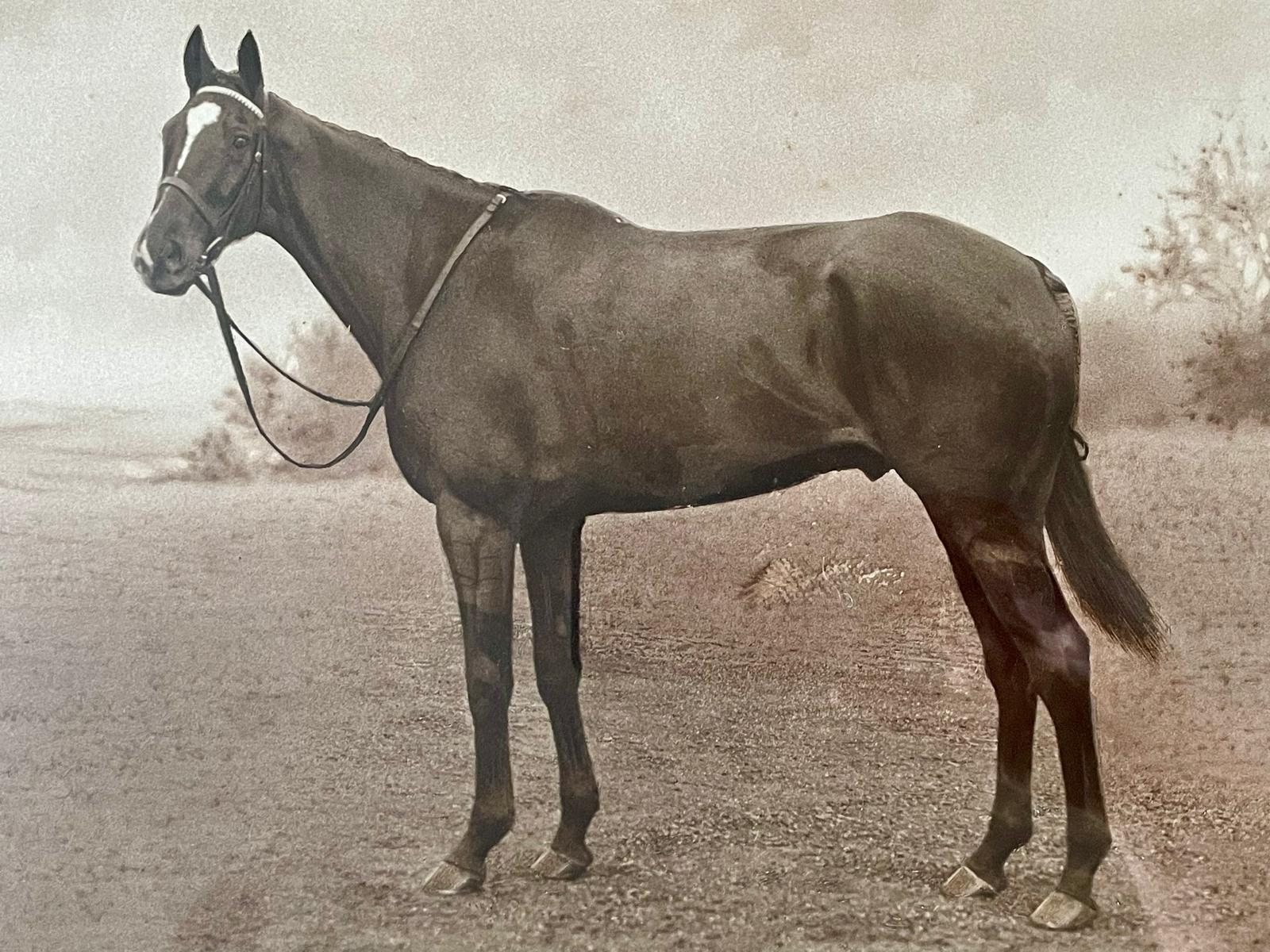
- Shaun Goilin in 1930
- Sire: Unknown
- Dam: Golden Day
- Damsire: Golden Measure
- Sex: Gelding
- Foaled: 1920
- Country: (Republic of Ireland) Ireland
- Colour: Chestnut
- Breeder: Major John Edwards
- Owner: Joan Mary de Sales La Terriere; Jack Widger; Walter H. Midwood
- Trainer: Frank Hartigan
- Record: 51: 6–4–9 (National Hunt Rules)

Major wins
- Grand Sefton Steeplechase (1929); Grand National (1930)

Shaun Goilin (1920–1940) was an Irish-bred, English-trained racehorse who won the 1930 Grand National at Aintree, famous for being the only winner in Grand National history to have an unknown sire.

== Background ==
Shaun Goilin (Irish Gaelic for John the Fairy), a chestnut-coloured gelding with a white blaze, was foaled in 1920 at the Rathduff stud of Major John Edwards' in County Tipperary in the Republic of Ireland. In 1922, aged two years, he was sold by Edwards to Joan Mary de Sales La Terriere for just 22 guineas, a conspicuously low price for a future champion.

Shaun Goilin's inauspicious beginnings were due to his vague breeding. His dam - Golden Day - was reportedly stabled in a paddock next to another holding three colts. One of these apparently jumped the fence and sired Shaun Goilin. Edwards later maintained that a horse named Shaun Aboo was responsible, but, officially at least, Shaun Goilin remains unique among Grand National winners for having an unknown sire.

In 1925 Shaun Goilin was auctioned at Goff's bloodstock auction in Co. Kildare to Jack Widger for 550 guineas. Widger would keep the horse in Ireland before selling him on to Walter H. Midwood in 1927, a Liverpool cotton trader and Master of the Cheshire Hunt, for 1,250 guineas. Widger remarked to Midwood at the time that "That horse will win a 'National' for you". Midwood sent Shaun Goilin to be trained under Irish jockey-turned-trainer, Frank Hartigan at his stables in Weyhill, Hampshire.

== Racing career ==
Shaun Goilin's first notable win came in the Grand Sefton Steeplechase at Aintree on 6 November 1929. Ridden by Murtagh Keogh, Shaun Goilin took the lead at the last fence and pulled away from the field to win comfortably. While the victory was seen as a good marker for the Grand National, he fared less well in the National Trial Steeplechase at Gatwick on 1 March 1930. Starting favourite, Shaun Goilin ultimately came in unplaced in sixth.

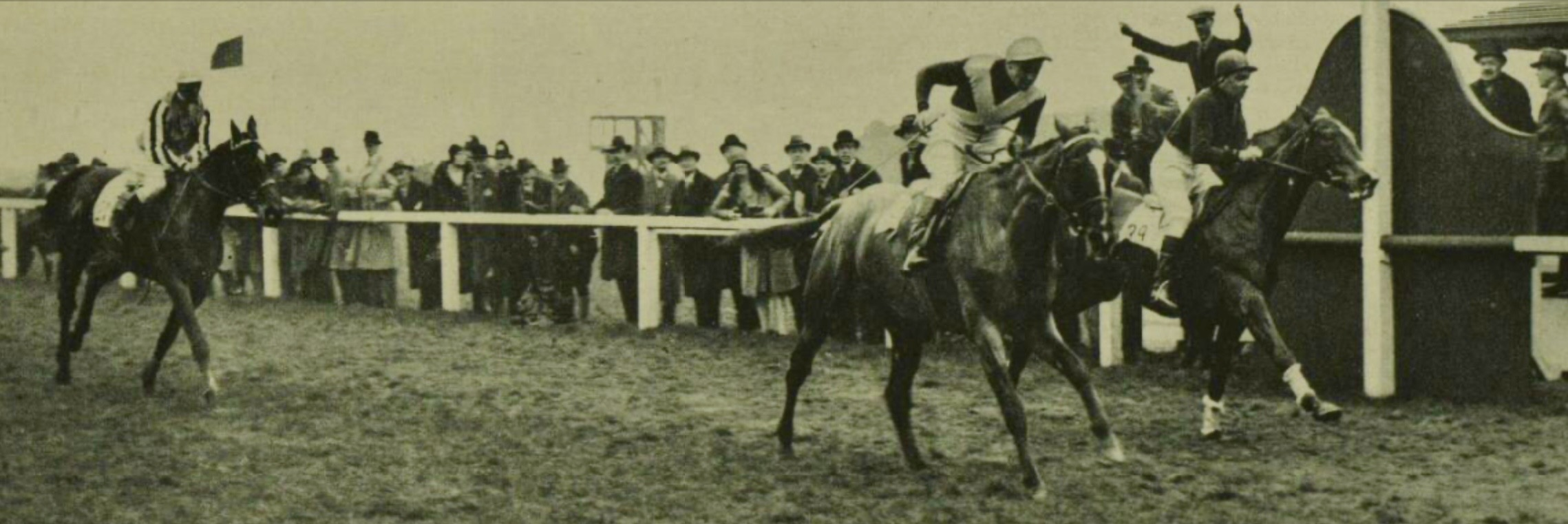
Shaun Goilin crossing the finishing post to win the 1930 Grand National

Amid fine weather, a record crowd was present at Aintree for the Grand National on 29 March 1930. Carrying a handicap of 11st 7lb, Shaun Goilin began the race as the 100/8 second favourite (behind Grakle, priced at 100/12) his price shortened due to the thousands of Irish - including a number of Catholic priests - who romantically backed the combination of Irish horse, trainer and jockey. Despite good going, only five of the 41 starters stayed the course and the result remains among the closest finishes on record. By the last fence it was a straight shootout between the leading three; Melleray's Belle, Sir Lindsay and Shaun Goilin. On the final flat, a burst of speed enabled Shaun Goilin to outpace his two rivals and win by a neck in the unusually fast time of 9 minutes, 40 3/4 seconds (compared with an average for the time of over 10 minutes). So close was the finish that James Mason, riding Melleray's Belle, initially thought that he had won.

Shaun Goilin's jockey, Tommy Cullinan, who had only been partnered with the horse three days before the off, remarked that his horse had provided him with an "armchair journey." He went on to say:

"[Shaun Goilin] is the greatest leaper I have ever ridden… Really, all I had to do was a bit of work at the finish. The horse did the rest. Not one single mistake did he make, and right from the start I was going on the bit. The horse gave me such a confident feeling that the only surprising thing was that I didn't win by a wider margin. I just let him run along in my hands all the time, having in mind that I must save a bit for the finish. Everything went well in the first circuit, and I kept a good place, in nice touch with the leaders. We jumped the water second and when we got into the country again I let Glangesia continue to give me a lead. The field gradually thinned down, but no matter what came along to join us in the front rank, I felt my horse going strongly, and I had no fear. There were three of us left to fight it out coming on to the racecourse. Here I got my first shock. Two fences from home I lost an iron and had to jump the last fence with only one foot in a stirrup. I did not recover it until after passing the winning post, but though my horse rolled a bit after landing on the flat, he came again and ran his race out as game as a pebble, though we both had to put in all we knew to land that wonderful prize."

A review of the race from the 7 April 1930 edition of Time Magazine said of Shaun Goilin that he "...is an eccentric horse. He will not eat hay, oats, or bran when away from home, accepts only delicacies offered by a friend's hand. All he had to eat on the day of the race was an apple his trainer gave him on the way to the post."

A year later, Keogh took Shaun Goilin's mount again for the 1931 Grand National, finishing in 6th behind Grakle. In the 1932 Grand National, Shaun Goilin recorded his second Grand National placing under the mount of Dudley Williams, finishing third behind Forbra. In April that year, after placing third in the Scottish Grand National at Bogside, Shaun Goilin's retirement from racing was announced, aged 12. He had run 50 races, winning only six, placing second on four occasions, and third on nine. Yet his prodigious staying power as a fencer, in addition to his romantic origins from an unknown sire, made it a decision worthy of note.

Nevertheless, in February 1933, despite having not run a race since April of the previous year, owner Midwood arranged for Shaun Goilin to be allowed one final entry in the Grand National at Aintree. Once again, he completed the course, though only in a distant 16th under his mount, Peter Cazalet.

== Retirement and death ==
Retired for good after the 1933 Grand National, aged 13, Shaun Goilin was initially used by owner Midwood as a hunter. However, the horse showed little aptitude and was soon returned to his trainer, Frank Hartigan, in Weyhill, who rode him every day as exercise with the other horses.' Shaun Goilin died on 24 April 1940, aged 20. It was reported at the time that Shaun Goilin "...escaped from his box at the stables and galloped round a paddock until exhaustion stopped him. It was his last fling, and a few hours later he died."

In a tragic coincidence, Tommy Cullinan - Shaun Goilin's 1930 Grand National winning jockey - had died only days previously, on 11 April 1940, at the Oxfordshire Royal Air Force station where he was serving.
