= Llanddona =

Village and community in Anglesey, Wales

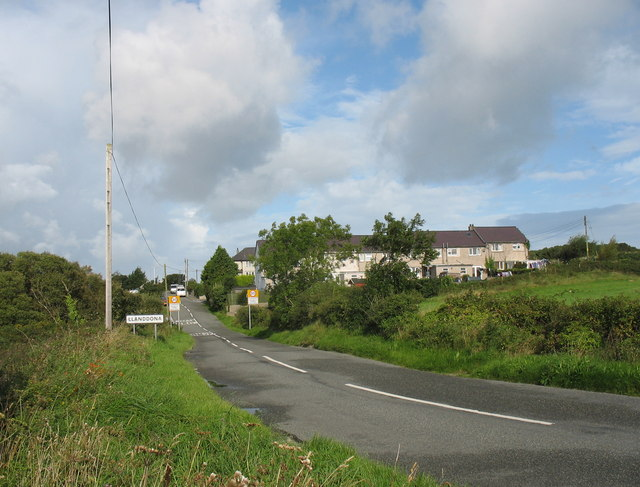
- Llanddona

- Location within Anglesey
- Population: 691 (2011)
- OS grid reference: SH5779
- Community: Llanddona
- Principal area: Anglesey
- Preserved county: Gwynedd
- Country: Wales
- Sovereign state: United Kingdom
- Post town: BEAUMARIS
- Postcode district: LL58
- Dialling code: 01248
- Police: North Wales
- Fire: North Wales
- Ambulance: Welsh
- UK Parliament: Ynys Môn
- Senedd Cymru – Welsh Parliament: Bangor Conwy Môn
- List of places UK Wales Anglesey 53.293°N 4.139°W Map of the community

Llanddona (Welsh: [ɬanˈðɔna]; Welsh pronunciation) is a village and community in Anglesey, Wales. Located between Benllech and Beaumaris, it is popular as a holiday destination, particularly for families and is noted for its sandy beach. Llanddona has no shops; however, it has a riding school and a public house. At the 2001 census it had a population of 639, increasing to 691 at the 2011 census.

Llanddona transmitting station is located approximately one mile to the north east of the village. The station is the main broadcasting site for television and radio in north Wales.

St Dona's Church, Llanddona, dates from 610, although the present building was erected in 1873.

Llanddona is said to have once been home to a family of witches, whose powers descended from mother to daughter.
