= Lucia Mida =

American golfer

- Mida playing a round of golf (1926)

Personal information
- Full name: Hedwig Louise E. Gueth Mida
- Nationality: United States
- Born: August 4, 1887 Chicago, Illinois, U.S.
- Died: April 1952 U.S.
- Height: 5 ft 2 in (1.57 m)
- Spouse: Lee W. Mida

Career
- Sport: Golf
- Status: Amateur

Best results in LPGA major championships (wins: 1)
- Western Open: Won: 1930

Lucia Gueth Mida (August 4, 1887 – April 1952), also known as Mrs. Lee Mida and Louise Mida, was a golfer from Chicago, Illinois. She won the 1930 Women's Western Open, which was later designated by the LPGA as the first women's major. Mida was an experienced competitor at that time.

== Biography ==
Mida was born Hedwig Louise E. Gueth in Chicago, Illinois, to German immigrants August Gueth and Clara Friederich. Lee was her husband's name; wives and widows often used their husband's name with a "Mrs." added on back in her era. Her husband was the Chicago City Champion in 1909; leading the way to her own golfing career.

In addition to the 1930 Women's Western Open, Mida also won the Women's Western Amateur in 1923 and the Florida Women's State Golf Association State Amateur Match Play Championship in 1929 and 1930 (defeating Mrs. John L. Holmes). Her unwillingness to become a permanent resident of Florida forced Mida not to defend her title in 1931 as the competition become "closed" except to Florida residents.

Mida was one of the team members that in 1930 traveled to Europe to play an international match against Great Britain. That trip was the prelude to the Curtis Cup matches.

== Major championships ==
=== Wins (1) ===
Year	Championship	Winning score	Runner-up
1930	Women's Western Open	6 & 5	(United States) June Beebe (a)
