= 1929 Grand National =

English steeplechase horse race

- Grand National
- Location: Aintree Racecourse
- Date: 22 March 1929
- Winning horse: Gregalach
- Starting price: 100/1
- Jockey: Robert W. H. Everett
- Trainer: Tom Leader
- Owner: Mrs. Marion A. Gemmell
- Conditions: Good to soft

External videos
- Silent highlights of the 1929 Grand National (British Pathé)

The 1929 Grand National was the 88th renewal of the Grand National horse race that took place at Aintree Racecourse near Liverpool, England, on 22 March 1929.

It had the largest starting field of any Aintree Grand National with 66 horses taking part in the race.

The race was won by 100/1 outsider Gregalach, and it was the second successive year where a horse with such odds won. Fourth-placed Melleray's Belle started at odds of 200/1 and was the first horse with odds as wide as this to finish in the top four places since Magpie, also a 200/1 bet in 1886.

Gregalach was ridden by jockey Robert W. H. Everett and trained by Tom Leader, for owner Marion Gemmell. Easter Hero, the favourite, finished in second place and Richmond II was third.

Of the 66 runners, all but one returned safely to the stables. One horse, named Stort, incurred a leg fracture in a fall and was euthanised.

== Finishing order ==
| Position | Name | Jockey | Age | Handicap (st-lb) | SP | Distance |
|---|---|---|---|---|---|---|
| 1 | Gregalach | Bob Everett | 7 | 11-4 | 100/1 | 6 Lengths |
| 2 | Easter Hero | John Moloney | 9 | 12-7 | 9/2 | |
| 3 | Richmond II | Billy Stott | 6 | 10-6 | 40/1 | |
| 4 | Melleray's Belle | James F Mason | 10 | 10-0 | 200/1 | |
| 5 | May King | Fred Gurney | 10 | 11-2 | 66/1 | |
| 6 | Grakle | Tim Hamey | 7 | 11-9 | 18/1 | |
| 7 | D.D.B. | Mr R Gubbins | 9 | 10-11 | 66/1 | |
| 8 | Delarue | Gerry Wilson | 7 | 10-3 | 200/1 | |
| 9 | Kilbairn | Mr L Parry | 8 | 10-0 | 200/1 | Last to complete |

== Non-finishers ==
| Fence | Name | Jockey | Age | Handicap (st-lb) | SP | Fate |
|---|---|---|---|---|---|---|
| ? | Camperdown | Kenyon Goode | 10 | 10-0 | 200/1 | Fell |
| ? | Sprig | Tony Escott | 12 | 12-5 | 50/1 | Fell |
| ? | Bright's Boy | Eric Foster | 10 | 10-4 | 25/1 | Fell |
| ? | Koko | Sylvester Duffy | 11 | 12-3 | 66/1 | Fell |
| ? | Great Span | William Payne | 8 | 12-0 | 100/6 | Pulled Up |
| ? | Trump Card | Tommy Morgan | 11 | 11-12 | 33/1 | Fell |
| 03 | Mount Etna | Ted Leader | 12 | 11-7 | 28/1 | Fell |
| ? | Knight of the Wilderness | Murtagh Keogh | 9 | 11-7 | 40/1 | |
| ? | Billy Barton | Tommy Cullinan | 11 | 11-7 | 20/1 | Fell |
| ? | Lloydee | Dick Rees | 7 | 11-4 | 22/1 | Fell |
| ? | The Ace II | Mr G Evans | 7 | 11-3 | 66/1 | |
| ? | Ardeen | Bob Lyall | 12 | 11-2 | 25/1 | |
| ? | Carfax | Mr Basil Ancil | 13 | 11-1 | 40/1 | |
| ? | Ballystockart | Captain Reginald Sassoon | 10 | 11-0 | 66/1 | |
| 11 | Stort | T Chisman | 10 | 11-0 | 200/1 | Fell |
| ? | Lordi | Captain Henry Weber | 8 | 11-0 | 28/1 | Fell |
| ? | Master Billie | Mr Monty Rayson | 10 | 11-0 | 20/1 | Pulled Up |
| ? | Le Touquet | T Teasdale | 7 | 11-12 | 200/1 | |
| ? | Skrun Prince | Bill Gurney | 8 | 10-12 | 22/1 | Fell |
| ? | Overdraft | Mr R Bennet | 7 | 10-11 | 66/1 | |
| ? | Rampant | Harry Misa | 9 | 10-11 | 100/1 | |
| ? | Tipperary Tim | Bill Dutton | 11 | 10-10 | 100/1 | Fell |
| 03 | Darracq | Mr G S Poole | 14 | 10-10 | 40/1 | Fell |
| ? | K.C.B. | James Hogan jnr | 7 | 10-10 | 50/1 | |
| ? | Ardoon's Pride | Dick Thrale | 9 | 10-10 | 200/1 | Fell |
| ? | Sandy Hook | Frank Fish | 8 | 10-9 | 100/1 | Fell |
| ? | Herbert's Choice | J Farrell | 8 | 10-8 | 200/1 | Fell |
| ? | Dwarf of the Forest | Mr Harry Kennard | 12 | 10-8 | 200/1 | Fell |
| ? | Drinmond | Barney Balding | 12 | 10-8 | 50/1 | Fell |
| ? | Uncle Ben | Pat Powell | 8 | 10-8 | 40/1 | |
| ? | Beechmartin | Lewis Rees | 8 | 10-7 | 50/1 | |
| ? | Ruddyman | Billy Parvin | 10 | 10-5 | 50/1 | Fell |
| ? | Hawker | Captain A E Grant | 15 | 10-5 | 200/1 | |
| ? | Gay Dog II | A Birch | 10 | 10-3 | 200/1 | |
| ? | Denburgh | Gerald Hardy | 10 | 10-3 | 200/1 | Fell |
| ? | Sultan of Wicken | T James | 10 | 10-3 | 200/1 | |
| ? | Kilbrain | Victor Piggott | 9 | 10-3 | 100/1 | Fell |
| ? | Ballyhanwood | Jack Goswell | 8 | 10-2 | 100/1 | |
| ? | Soldier's Joy | Captain Gossage | 11 | 10-2 | 200/1 | |
| ? | Irina | J Kelly | 7 | 10-0 | 200/1 | Fell |
| ? | Duke of Florence | G Turner | 8 | 10-0 | 50/1 | |
| ? | Harewood | Dudley Williams | 7 | 10-0 | 40/1 | Fell |
| ? | Mabestown's Pride | Mr D R Daly | 13 | 10-0 | 200/1 | Knocked Over |
| ? | Rathory | Roger Burford | 13 | 10-0 | 200/1 | |
| ? | Cloringo | A Wall | 8 | 10-0 | 200/1 | Fell |
| ? | Merrivale II | Fred Brookes | 11 | 10-0 | 50/1 | Fell |
| ? | Miss Balscadden | George Bowden | 10 | 10-0 | 200/1 | |
| ? | Odd Cat | J Sinnot | 8 | 10-0 | 200/1 | |
| ? | Best Home | Mr G Elliott | 8 | 10-0 | 200/1 | Fell |
| ? | Big Wonder | J Bisggod | 9 | 10-0 | 50/1 | |
| ? | Fleet Prince | Mr Fred Thackray | 11 | 10-0 | 200/1 | Fell |
| ? | Kawngo | Arthur Waudby | 8 | 10-0 | 200/1 | |
| ? | More Din | A Harroway | 9 | 10-0 | 200/1 | Fell |
| ? | Stage Management | M Doherty | 9 | 10-0 | 100/1 | Fell |
| ? | Theorem | T Costello | 12 | 10-0 | 200/1 | Fell |
| ? | Toy Bell | Danny Morgan | 7 | 10-0 | 100/1 | Fell |
| ? | Wild Edgar | S Regan | 9 | 10-0 | 200/1 | Fell |

== Media coverage and aftermath ==
The media largely praised Aintree's decision to fill in the ditch at The Canal Turn in the wake of the pile up that happened there the previous year but the sheer volume of entries again led to criticism, despite Aintree having introduced an additional forfeit stage in the conditions. The Hon George Lambton claimed that the conditions of the race encouraged poor horses to be entered and that the framing of the weights was also unfair and that the top weights should not be forced to burden as much as 35lbs more than those at the foot of the handicap. Aintree responded the following year by increasing the minimum entry age from five to six years, though changes to the handicap remained unaltered until 1960.
