= 1930 Women's Western Open =

Golf tournament

The 1930 Women's Western Open was a golf competition held at Acacia Country Club in Indian Head Park, Illinois outside Chicago, which was the first edition of the Women's Western Open. Lucia Mida won the championship in match play competition by defeating June Beebe in the final match, 6 and 5.
