= 1929–30 Sheffield Shield season =

34th season of the domestic first-class cricket competition

- Cricket format: First-class
- Tournament format: Double round-robin
- Champions: Victoria (12th title)
- Participants: 4
- Matches: 12
- Most runs: Don Bradman (New South Wales) (894)
- Most wickets: Clarrie Grimmett (South Australia) (43)

The 1929–30 Sheffield Shield season was the 34th season of the Sheffield Shield, the domestic first-class cricket competition of Australia. The Victoria Cricket team finished as champions.

== Points system ==
- 5 points for a win
- 3 points for a win on first innings
- 2 points for a draw
- 1 point for a loss on first innings

== Table ==
Team	Played	Won	1st Inns Won	1st Inns Lost	Lost	Drawn	Points
Victoria	6	4	0	1	0	1	23
New South Wales	6	3	1	0	1	1	20
South Australia	6	2	1	0	3	0	13
Queensland	6	0	0	1	5	0	1

== Statistics ==
=== Most Runs ===
Don Bradman - 894

=== Most Wickets ===
Clarrie Grimmett - 43
