= Evan Williams (jockey) =

Welsh jockey

Evan Morgan Williams (9 May 1912 – 12 July 2001) was a horse racing jockey born in Cowbridge, Wales, in 1912. He won the 1937 Grand National on Royal Mail, and he won the Cheltenham Gold Cup in 1936 (on Golden Miller) and 1940 (on Roman Hackle).

Evan Williams' father, Fred, was an amateur jockey. After service in the armed forces during the Second World War, he became a trainer and won the first running of the King George VI and Queen Elizabeth Stakes in 1951 (with Supreme Court). He later relocated to Ireland, and died on 16 July 2001, aged 89.
