= 1930 Grand National =

English steeplechase horse race

- Grand National
- Location: Aintree Racecourse
- Date: 28 March 1930
- Winning horse: (Republic of Ireland) Shaun Goilin
- Starting price: 100/8
- Jockey: (Republic of Ireland) Tommy Cullinan
- Trainer: (Republic of Ireland) Frank Hartigan
- Owner: Walter Midwood
- Conditions: Good

External videos
- Silent highlights of the 1930 Grand National (British Pathé)

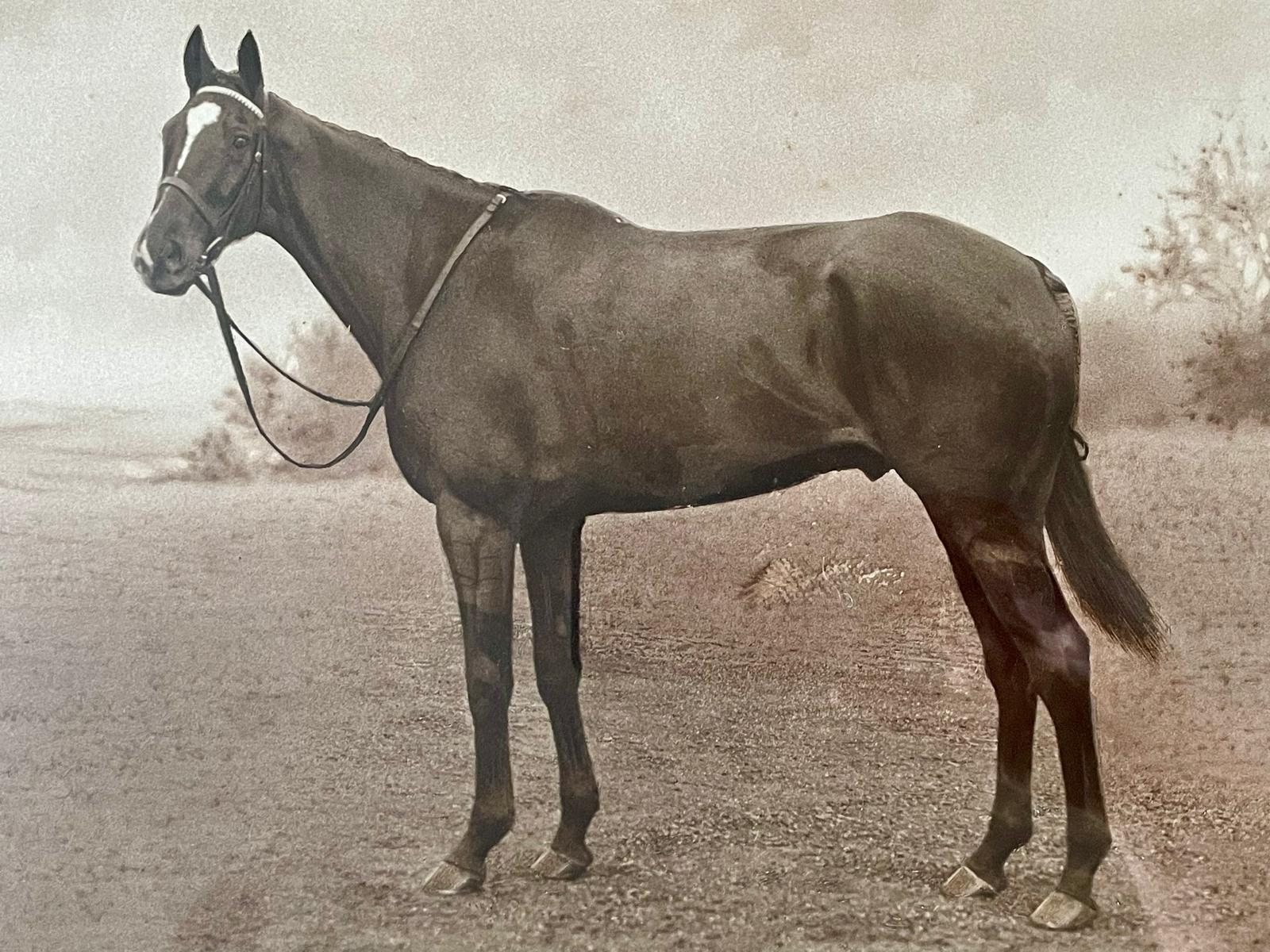
Shaun Goilin, winner of the 1930 Grand National

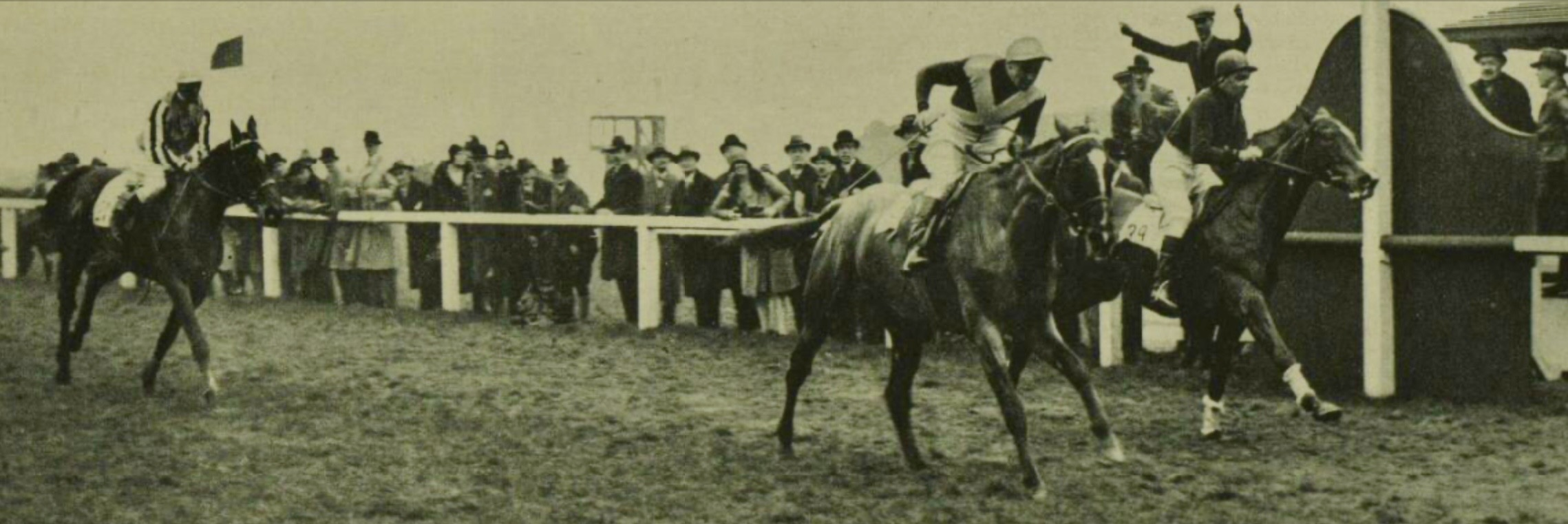
Shaun Goilin crossing the finishing post ahead of Melleray's Belle and Sir Lindsay

The 1930 Grand National was the 89th renewal of the Grand National horse race that took place at Aintree Racecourse near Liverpool, England, on 29 March 1930.

The race was won by 100/8 shot Shaun Goilin, who had been foaled in Ireland in unusual circumstances. According to reports, his dam - Golden Day - was stabled in a paddock next to another holding three colts. One of these seemingly jumped the fence and sired Shaun Goilin, who as a result remains unique among Grand National winners for having an unknown sire.

Shaun Goilin was ridden by Irish jockey Tommy Cullinan and trained by Irish trainer Frank Hartigan, for owner Walter Midwood. The 10 year-old was well backed and started the race as second favourite behind Grakle, carrying a handicap of 11st 7lb. His price was seemingly shortened due to the thousands of Irish - including a number of Catholic priests - who romantically backed the combination of Irish horse, trainer and jockey.

Despite good going only five of the 41 starters stayed the course and Derby Day was fatally injured in a fall.

The finish remains among the closest on record. By the last fence it was a straight shootout between the leading three; Melleray's Belle, Sir Lindsay and Shaun Goilin. On the final flat a burst of speed enabled Shaun Goilin to outpace his two rivals and win by a neck in the unusually fast time of 9 minutes, 40 3/4 seconds (compared with an average for the time of over 10 minutes). So close was the finish that James Mason, riding Melleray's Belle, initially thought that he had won.

Shaun Goilin's jockey, Cullinan, who had only been partnered with his horse three days before the off, remarked that his horse had provided him with an "armchair journey". Cullinan said after the race;

"[Shaun Goilin] is the greatest leaper I have ever ridden... Really, all I had to do was a bit of work at the finish. The horse did the rest. Not one single mistake did he make, and right from the start I was going on the bit. The horse gave me such a confident feeling that the only surprising thing was that I didn't win by a wider margin. I just let him run along in my hands all the time, having in mind that I must save a bit for the finish. Everything went well in the first circuit, and I kept a good place, in nice touch with the leaders. We jumped the water second and when we got into the country again I let Glangesia continue to give me a lead. The field gradually thinned down, but no matter what came along to join us in the front rank, I felt my horse going strongly, and I had no fear. There were three of us left to fight it out coming on to the racecourse. Here I got my first shock. Two fences from home I lost an iron and had to jump the last fence with only one foot in a stirrup. I did not recover it until after passing the winning post, but though my horse rolled a bit after landing on the flat, he came again and ran his race out as game as a pebble, though we both had to put in all we knew to land that wonderful prize."

Shaun Goilin's owner Midwood apparently gave Cullinan a cheque for £1,000 out of the £5,000 prize money he received for the win.

== Finishing order ==
Position	Name	Jockey	Age	Handicap (st-lb)	SP	Distance
1	Shaun Goilin	Tommy Cullinan	10	11-7	100/8	Neck
2	Melleray's Belle	James Mason	11	10-0	20/1	3 Lengths
3	Sir Lindsay	Dudley Williams	9	10-6	100/7	
4	Glangesia	John Browne	10	10-4	33/1	
5	Ballyhanwood	Eric Foster	9	10-4	33/1	
6	Royal Arch II	Fred Thackeray	9	10-2	50/1	

== Non-finishers ==
Fence	Name	Jockey	Age	Handicap (st-lb)	SP	Fate
10	Gregalach	Bob Everett	8	12-0	100/6	Fell
?	Gate Book	Tommy Morgan	9	11-8	50/1	Fell
?	Donzelon	Bob Lyall	9	11-7	66/1	Fell
?	Grakle	J Piggott	8	11-6	100/12	Fell
?	Newsboy	Captain Reginald Sassoon	9	11-4	50/1	Fell
?	Donegal	Billy Speck	13	11-2	25/1	Fell
?	Lordi	Billy Stott	9	11-2	28/1	Knocked Over
?	Alike	Mr M Barry	7	11-0	28/1	Fell
?	Ibstock	Kenyon Goode	10	10-12	100/1	Pulled Up
?	K.C.B.	John Moloney	8	10-12	22/1	Knocked Over
?	Sandy Hook	Ted Leader	9	10-12	25/1	Knocked Over
?	Peggie's Pride	Tim McCarthy	7	10-11	33/1	Fell
?	Guiding Light	Mr C W Langlands	9	10-11	100/1	Fell
?	Big Wonder	Capt H N Webber	10	10-11	50/1	Fell
?	Savernake	R McCarthy	10	10-10	100/1	Fell
22	May King	George Goswell jnr	11	10-9	40/1	Fell
?	Tootenhill	C.Wenham	?	?	33/1	Fell
?	Paris Flight	Tim Vinall	10	10-7	100/1	Pulled Up
?	Delarue	Gerry Wilson	8	10-6	100/1	Knocked Over
?	Agden	Mr D.P.G.Moseley	13	10-5	50/1	Pulled Up
23+	Toy Bell	Danny Morgan	8	10-5	66/1	Fell
?	Ruddyman	Eric Brown	11	10-2	100/1	Fell
?	Blennerhasset	Bill Dutton	11	10-2	66/1	Fell
?	May Crescent	Gerald Hardy	8	10-2	25/1	Fell
?	Cryptical	J.Bisgood	15	10-0	100/1	Pulled Up
?	Annandale	Fred Gurney	8	10-0	100/1	Fell
?	The Monk	Billy Parvin	8	10-0	100/1	Pulled Up
?	Soldier's Joy	J Farrell	12	10-0	100/1	Pulled Up
?	Curtain Raiser	Pat Powell	7	10-0	100/1	Pulled Up
4	Derby Day	Mr Stephenson	8	10-0	100/1	Fell
?	Gay Dog II	Bill Gurney	10	10-0	66/1	Pulled Up
?	Merrivale II	Fred Brookes	12	10-0	40/1	Fell
?	The Gosling	A.Tannock	10	10-0	100/1	Pulled Up
?	Harewood	Tim Hamey	8	10-0	100/1	Fell
?	Theorem	George Owen jnr	13	10-0	100/1	Fell
