= Forbra =

British-bred Thoroughbred racehorse

- Sire: Foresight
- Grandsire: Carbine
- Dam: Thymbra
- Damsire: Rochester
- Sex: Gelding
- Foaled: 1925
- Country: United Kingdom
- Colour: Bay
- Breeder: Harry Hunt @ Caldecott Rutland
- Owner: William Parsonage
- Trainer: Tom Rimell

Major wins
- Grand National (1932)

Honours
- Forbra Gold Challenge Cup at Ludlow Racecourse

Forbra (foaled 1925) was a National Hunt racehorse best known for being the winner of the 1932 Grand National steeplechase when relatively unconsidered at 50/1.

Prior to his victory in 1932, Forbra beat Golden Miller in a race where 'The Miller' was disqualified for carrying the wrong weight. The gelding had originally been aimed at another race at the meeting, but was switched to the National after winning a race at Taunton Racecourse. He started at odds of 50/1 in a field of thirty-six runners and won by three lengths from Egremont. Forbra subsequently finished sixth in the race in 1933 and fourth in 1934 and never fell during his racing career. He was put down in 1935 after a race at Newbury, having broken a fetlock between the final two fences.

Forbra's owner, Mr William (Billie) Parsonage, was a well-known commission agent based in Ludlow, Shropshire, and had previously attempted to win the National with a number of staying chasers. The best known of these was Master Billie, who had been greatly fancied and heavily backed in 1929.

Forbra was the first Grand National winner to emerge from the famous Kinnersley stables near Worcester, where in later years Fred Rimell, son of Forbra's trainer Tom Rimell, became a champion trainer, winning more Nationals and almost all the major NH events of his time.

Forbra is honoured each year with the Forbra Gold Challenge Cup, a Handicap Chase over three miles. It is held at Ludlow Racecourse in early March.
