= Josias Cunningham =

Sir Josias Cunningham, DL (20 January 1934 – 9 August 2000) was a Northern Irish stock broker, farmer and politician.

== Early life ==
Josias Cunningham, known as "Joe", the grandson of Samuel Cunningham, was born into a family of stock brokers, the family firm being Cunningham Coates. The family also owned The Northern Whig newspaper. He was educated at Fettes College, Edinburgh, where his uncles James Glencairn Cunningham and Dunlop McCosh Cunningham had attended. He then went on to read biological sciences at Clare College, Cambridge, where his uncle and politician Knox Cunningham had also attended.

== Career and politics ==
As well as working in the family firm he farmed 300 acres (1.2 km^{2}) of County Antrim. In 1991, upon the death of Sir George Clarke, he was elected President of the Ulster Unionist Council and was one of the last remainders of Northern Ireland's moneyed families to remain involved in politics through "The Troubles". He was a member of the Orange Order and lived on his farm at Templepatrick, County Antrim.

== Death ==
Sir Josias Cunningham died in a car accident at Carryduff, County Down in 2000, aged 66. His funeral took place in 1st Donegore Presbyterian Church. He was married and had four children. The UUP headquarters, Cunningham House, was named in his family's honour, and was dedicated by his widow.

Party political offices
Preceded by George Anthony Clark	President of the Ulster Unionist Party; 1990–2000	Succeeded by Martin Smyth
