= Samuel Cunningham =

Samuel or Sam Cunningham may refer to:

== Politics ==
- Samuel Cunningham (Canadian politician) (1848–1919), member of the Northwest Territories Legislative Assembly
- Samuel Cunningham (Northern Ireland politician) (1862–1946), Northern Irish businessman and politician
- Sir Knox Cunningham (Samuel Knox Cunningham, 1909–1976), Northern Irish barrister, businessman and politician, son of the above
- Sam Cunningham (mayor) (fl. 1975–2017), American politician, mayor of Waukegan, Illinois

== Sports ==
- Sam Cunningham (1950–2021), American football player
- Samuel Cunningham (footballer) (born 1989), Thai footballer

== See also ==
- Samuel Cunningham House, an historic home located near Hedgesville, Berkeley County, West Virginia, United States
