= 1926 in sports =

1926 in sports describes the year's events in world sport.

== American football ==
- NFL championship – Frankford Yellow Jackets (14–1–2)
- Rose Bowl (1925 season):
  - The Alabama Crimson Tide won 20–19 over the Washington Huskies to share the college football national championship

== Association football ==
England

- The Football League – Huddersfield Town 57 points, Arsenal 52, Sunderland 48, Bury 47, Sheffield United 46, Aston Villa 44
- FA Cup final – Bolton Wanderers 1–0 Manchester City at Empire Stadium, Wembley, London
- Huddersfield Town is the first team to win the League championship title three times in succession.

Germany

- National Championship – SpVgg Fürth 4–1 Hertha BSC at Frankfurt

Greece

- Formation of the Hellenic Football Federation (HFF)

== Athletics ==
Sweden

- the Second Women's World Games, Gothenburg

== Australian rules football ==
VFL Premiership

- Melbourne wins the 30th VFL Premiership: Melbourne 17.17 (119) d Collingwood 9.8 (62) at Melbourne Cricket Ground (MCG)

Brownlow Medal

- The annual Brownlow Medal is awarded to Ivor Warne-Smith (Melbourne)

== Bandy ==
Sweden

- Championship final – Västerås SK 1-0 IK Sirius

== Baseball ==
World Series

- 2–10 October — St. Louis Cardinals (NL) defeats New York Yankees (AL) to win the 1926 World Series by 4 games to 3

Negro leagues

- Rube Foster, founder of the Negro National League (NNL) and owner and manager of the Chicago American Giants, suffers a nervous breakdown and has to be confined to an asylum. His protégé Dave Malarcher takes over as manager and leads the team to the NNL pennant.
- The Chicago American Giants (NNL) defeat the Bacharach Giants of Atlantic City, New Jersey (ECL), 5 games to 3, in the 1926 Colored World Series.
- Mule Suttles of the St. Louis Stars hits a Negro leagues record 27 home runs. His .498 batting average and 21 triples are also records.

== Basketball ==
ABL Championship

- Cleveland Rosenblums over Brooklyn Arcadians (3–0)

== Boxing ==
Events

- 23 September — Gene Tunney defeats Jack Dempsey over 10 rounds in Philadelphia to win the World Heavyweight Championship
- Tiger Flowers twice defeats Harry Greb for the World Middleweight Championship but then loses it to former World Welterweight Champion Mickey Walker who holds it until 1931

Lineal world champions

- World Heavyweight Championship – Jack Dempsey → Gene Tunney
- World Light Heavyweight Championship – Paul Berlenbach → Jack Delaney
- World Middleweight Championship – Harry Greb → Tiger Flowers → Mickey Walker
- World Welterweight Championship – Mickey Walker → Pete Latzo
- World Lightweight Championship – Rocky Kansas → Sammy Mandell
- World Featherweight Championship – Louis "Kid" Kaplan → vacant
- World Bantamweight Championship – Charley Phil Rosenberg
- World Flyweight Championship – vacant

== Canadian football ==
Grey Cup

- 14th Grey Cup – Ottawa Senators 10–7 Toronto Varsity Blues

== Cricket ==
Events

- 31 May — India, New Zealand and West Indies are elected as Full Members of the Imperial Cricket Conference, increasing the number of nations playing Test cricket from three to six.
- England regains The Ashes from Australia by winning the five-match Test series 1–0. After the first four Tests are drawn, England wins the final match at The Oval by 289 runs.

England

- County Championship – Lancashire
- Minor Counties Championship – Durham
- Most runs – Jack Hobbs 2949 @ 77.60 (HS 316*)
- Most wickets – Charlie Parker 213 @ 18.40 (BB 8–73)
- Wisden Cricketers of the Year – George Geary, Harold Larwood, Jack Mercer, Bert Oldfield, Bill Woodfull

Australia

- Sheffield Shield – New South Wales
- Most runs – Arthur Richardson 904 @ 50.22 (HS 227)
- Most wickets – Clarrie Grimmett 59 @ 30.40 (BB 6–76)
- Victoria score 1,107 against New South Wales at the Melbourne Cricket Ground in December 1926 - still the largest innings total in first-class cricket.

India

- Bombay Quadrangular – Hindus

New Zealand

- Plunket Shield – Wellington

South Africa

- Currie Cup – not contested

West Indies

- Inter-Colonial Tournament – Trinidad and Tobago

== Cycling ==
Tour de France

- Lucien Buysse (Belgium) wins the 20th Tour de France

== Figure skating ==
World Figure Skating Championships

- World Women's Champion – Herma Szabo (Austria)
- World Men's Champion – Willi Böckel (Austria)
- World Pairs Champions – Andreé Joly-Brunet and Pierre Brunet (France)

== Golf ==
Events

- Bobby Jones becomes the first golfer to win the British and US Open titles in the same year.

Major tournaments

- British Open – Bobby Jones
- US Open – Bobby Jones
- USPGA Championship – Walter Hagen

Other tournaments

- British Amateur – Jess Sweetser
- US Amateur – George Von Elm

== Horse racing ==
England

- Cheltenham Gold Cup – Koko
- Grand National – Jack Horner
  - 19 April – Willie Watkinson, the Grand National-winning jockey, dies three weeks after his victory in a fall at Bogside, Scotland
- 1,000 Guineas Stakes – Pillion
- 2,000 Guineas Stakes – Colorado
- The Derby – Coronach
- The Oaks – Short Story
- St. Leger Stakes – Coronach

Australia

- Melbourne Cup – Spearfelt

Canada

- King's Plate – Haplite

France

- Prix de l'Arc de Triomphe – Biribi

Ireland

- Irish Grand National – Amberwave
- Irish Derby Stakes – Embargo

USA

- Kentucky Derby – Bubbling Over
- Preakness Stakes – Display
- Belmont Stakes – Crusader

== Ice hockey ==
Stanley Cup

- 30 March to 6 April — Montreal Maroons defeats Victoria Cougars in the 1926 Stanley Cup Finals by 3 games to 1

Events

- Allan Cup – University of Toronto defeats Port Arthur Bearcats
- Memorial Cup – Calgary Canadians defeats Queen's University
- The professional Western Hockey League folds; most players are sold for $300,000 to the National Hockey League (NHL).
- December — new expansion teams debut in the NHL: Chicago Black Hawks, Detroit Cougars and New York Rangers

== Lacrosse ==
Events

- Rosabelle Sinclair establishes the United States' first women's lacrosse team at Bryn Mawr School

== Nordic skiing ==
FIS Nordic World Ski Championships

- 2nd FIS Nordic World Ski Championships 1926 are held at Lahti, Finland

== Rowing ==
The Boat Race

- 27 March — Cambridge wins the 78th Oxford and Cambridge Boat Race

== Rugby league ==
England

- Championship – Wigan
- Challenge Cup final – Swinton 9–3 Oldham at Athletic Grounds, Rochdale
- Lancashire League Championship – Wigan
- Yorkshire League Championship – Hull Kingston Rovers
- Lancashire County Cup – Swinton 15–11 Wigan
- Yorkshire County Cup – Dewsbury 2–0 Huddersfield

Australia

- NSW Premiership – South Sydney 11–5 University (grand final)

== Rugby union ==
Five Nations Championship

- 39th Five Nations Championship series is shared by Ireland and Scotland

== Speed skating ==
Speed Skating World Championships

- Men's Allround Champion @ Trondheim, Norway – Ivar Ballangrud (Norway)
- Overall Ladies World Champion @ Saint John, New Brunswick – Lela Brooks (Canada)
- World Outdoor Champion – Charles Gorman (Canada)
- International Outdoor Champion in pack style – John Farrell (United States)

== Tennis ==
Australia

- Australian Men's Singles Championship – John Hawkes (Australia) defeats James Willard (Australia) 6–1 6–3 6–1
- Australian Women's Singles Championship – Daphne Akhurst Cozens (Australia) defeats Esna Boyd Robertson (Australia) 6–1 6–3

England

- Wimbledon Men's Singles Championship – Jean Borotra (France) defeats Howard Kinsey (USA) 8–6 6–1 6–3
- Wimbledon Women's Singles Championship – Kitty McKane Godfree (Great Britain) defeats Lilí de Álvarez (Spain) 6–2 4–6 6–3

France

- French Men's Singles Championship – Henri Cochet (France) defeats René Lacoste (France) 6–2 6–4 6–3
- French Women's Singles Championship – Suzanne Lenglen (France) defeats Mary Browne (USA) 6–1 6–0

USA

- American Men's Singles Championship – René Lacoste (France) defeats Jean Borotra (France) 6–4 6–0 6–4
- American Women's Singles Championship – Molla Bjurstedt Mallory (Norway) defeats Elizabeth Ryan (USA) 4–6 6–4 9–7

Davis Cup

- 1926 International Lawn Tennis Challenge – United States 4–1 France at Germantown Cricket Club (grass) Philadelphia, United States
