= Limber Hill =

British-bred Thoroughbred racehorse

- Sire: Bassam
- Grandsire: Guido Reni
- Dam: Mindoon
- Damsire: Gainsborough
- Sex: Gelding
- Foaled: 1947
- Country: United Kingdom
- Colour: Chestnut
- Breeder: James Davey
- Owner: James Davey
- Trainer: Bill Dutton

Major wins
- National Hunt Handicap Chase (1955); King George VI Chase (1955); Cheltenham Gold Cup (1956)

Limber Hill (foaled 1947) was a British Thoroughbred racehorse who won the 1956 Cheltenham Gold Cup. He was owned and bred by James Davey and trained in Yorkshire by Bill Dutton. After racing on the point-to-point circuit he then ran over hurdles before becoming a steeplechaser in 1954. He made an immediate impact and won the National Hunt Handicap Chase at the end of his first season. In the 1955/56 National Hunt season he was the leading staying chaser in Britain winning both the King George VI Chase and the Cheltenham Gold Cup. He continued to race until 1958 but his later career was disrupted by injury and he never recovered his best form.

== Background ==
Limber Hill was a chestnut gelding with a narrow white stripe bred by his owner James Davey who named the horse after his farm at Great Limber in Lincolnshire. He was the only horse of any consequence sired by the French-bred stallion Bassam. His dam Mindoon showed no racing ability and had had little prior success as a broodmare. In the year before Limber Hill was conceived she had been sent to a non-Thorouhbred stallion in an attempt to breed a field hunter. She was a distant female-line descendant of the influential British broodmare Pamela.

Davey sent the horse into training with Bill Dutton at Malton, North Yorkshire. Dutton first came to fame as an amateur jockey by riding Tipperary Tim to victory in the 1928 Grand National and later became a very successful trainer of both flat horses and jumpers. Apart from Limber Hill his most famous horses were the sprinters Pappa Fourway and Right Boy.

== Racing career ==
Limber Hill began his racing career on the amateur point-to-point circuit before moving up to compete against professional opposition. He showed promise as a hurdler in the 1953/54 National Hunt season before being campaigned in steeplechases in the following season. In his first season over fences he made steady improvement to win at least three novice chases. He was then matched against more experienced opponents and recorded his first important success when he won the National Hunt Handicap Chase at the Cheltenham Festival.

In the following season Limber Hill made further progress and defeated Gay Donald at Manchester Racecourse in November before establishing himself as one of the best staying chasers in Britain in the King George VI Chase at Kempton Park. Starting at odds of 3/1 he won by a neck from Galloway Braes in what was described as "one of the most exciting steeplechases of recent years". In the month preceding the 1956 Cheltenham Festival many meetings were abandoned because of frozen ground and Dutton kept Limber Hill fit by galloping him on the beach at Filey. In the Cheltenham Gold Cup on 8 March he was ridden as at Kempton by Jimmy Power and started the 11/8 favourite against ten opponents. The best of his rivals appeared to be the 1954 winner Four Ten and Halloween who had finished second, third and second again in the last three runnings of the race. Limber Hill was not among the early leaders as Four Ten set a slow pace before the novice Cruachan took over on the second circuit. Power made a forward move approaching the third last and Limber Hill jumped past Cruachan at the next fence to take the lead before going clear. He stayed on up the run-in to win by four lengths from the French-bred outsider Vigor with Halloween finishing strongly to deprive Cruachan of third place. The victory made him the first horse trained in the North of England to win the Gold Cup.

In late 1956 Limber Hill was beaten on heavy ground in the Emblem Chase at Aintree Racecourse and then injured his back when preparing for an attempt to win the King George for a second time. He never recovered his best form: in fact he never won another race. In early 1958 he returned to fitness but broke a blood vessel and was pulled up in the Great Yorkshire Chase. He made a final attempt to win the Gold Cup in March that year and finished fifth to the mare Kerstin.

== Assessment and honours ==
In their book, A Century of Champions, based on the Timeform rating system, John Randall and Tony Morris rated Limber Hill a "superior" Gold Cup winner and the best British-trained winner of the race since Golden Miller. He is remembered in the name of Limber Hill, a residential street in Cheltenham.

== Pedigree ==
Pedigree of Limber Hill (GB), chestnut gelding, 1947
Sire Bassam (FR) 1933	Guido Reni (FR); 1916	Blarney	Irish Lad
Sire Bassam (FR) 1933	Guido Reni (FR); 1916	Blarney	Armenia
Sire Bassam (FR) 1933	Guido Reni (FR); 1916	La Gangue	Strozzi
Sire Bassam (FR) 1933	Guido Reni (FR); 1916	La Gangue	Golden Rod
Sire Bassam (FR) 1933	Barbichon (FR); 1923	Saint Moritz	Faucheur
Sire Bassam (FR) 1933	Barbichon (FR); 1923	Saint Moritz	Simornis
Sire Bassam (FR) 1933	Barbichon (FR); 1923	Dame en Gris	Oversight
Sire Bassam (FR) 1933	Barbichon (FR); 1923	Dame en Gris	Messaouda
Dam Mindoon (GB) 1933	Gainsborough (GB); 1915	Bayardo	Bay Ronald
Dam Mindoon (GB) 1933	Gainsborough (GB); 1915	Bayardo	Galicia
Dam Mindoon (GB) 1933	Gainsborough (GB); 1915	Rosedrop	St Frusquin
Dam Mindoon (GB) 1933	Gainsborough (GB); 1915	Rosedrop	Rosaline
Dam Mindoon (GB) 1933	Colleen (GB); 1927	Golden Sun	Sundridge
Dam Mindoon (GB) 1933	Colleen (GB); 1927	Golden Sun	Golden Lassie
Dam Mindoon (GB) 1933	Colleen (GB); 1927	Shanogue	William the Third
Dam Mindoon (GB) 1933	Colleen (GB); 1927	Shanogue	Isleta (Family: 13-a)
