= Knox Cunningham =

Northern Irish politician (1909–1976)

Sir Knox Cunningham Bt QC
- Sir Knox Cunningham, 1st Baronet in 1963

Member of Parliament for South Antrim
- In office 26 May 1955 – 29 May 1970
- Preceded by: Douglas Savory
- Succeeded by: James Molyneaux

Parliamentary Private Secretary to the Prime Minister
- In office 1959–1963
- Prime Minister: Harold Macmillan
- Preceded by: Anthony Barber
- Succeeded by: Francis Pearson

Personal details
- Born: Samuel Knox Cunningham; 3 April 1909 Fernhill House, Belfast, Ireland
- Died: 29 July 1976 (aged 67) Minchinhampton, Gloucestershire
- Party: Ulster Unionist
- Spouse: Dorothy Enid Riley JP (m. 2 July 1935)
- Relations: James Glencairn Cunningham; Josias Cunningham; Dunlop McCosh Cunningham; Sir Josias Cunningham
- Parent(s): Samuel Cunningham; Janet Muir Knox (nee McCosh) of Dalry, Ayrshire
- Education: Royal Belfast Academical Institution; Fettes College, Edinburgh; Clare College, Cambridge
- Occupation: Barrister

Military service
- Allegiance: United Kingdom
- Branch/service: British Army
- Years of service: 1939–1945
- Unit: Scots Guards
- Battles/wars: Second World War

Sir Samuel Knox Cunningham, 1st Baronet, QC (3 April 1909 – 29 July 1976) was a Northern Irish barrister, businessman and politician. As an Ulster Unionist politician at a time when the Unionists were part of the Conservative Party, he was also a significant figure in United Kingdom politics as Parliamentary Private Secretary to Harold Macmillan. His nephew was Sir Josias Cunningham.

== Early career ==
Cunningham was from an Ulster family. His father was Samuel Cunningham, and his mother was Janet Muir Knox (née McCosh) of Dalry, Ayrshire. His elder brothers were Colonel James Glencairn Cunningham, Josias Cunningham (a stockbroker), and Dunlop McCosh Cunningham, the owner of Murray's tobacco works in Belfast. He was sent to the Royal Belfast Academical Institution, and then to Fettes College in Edinburgh. He then won a place at Clare College, Cambridge - where he was heavyweight boxing champion. The family had considerable business interests in land, tobacco, commerce and finance.

From 1931 Cunningham went into business in Northern Ireland. He married Dorothy Enid Riley JP on 2 July 1935. Later in the 1930s, Cunningham studied law and was called to the Bar by the Middle Temple in 1939. During the Second World War he served in the Scots Guards although he continued his legal studies, and was called to the Bar in Northern Ireland in 1942. He fought the Belfast West by-election in 1943 and the same seat in the 1945 general election.

After the war Cunningham mainly lived in Orpington, although he retained membership of the Ulster Unionist Council. His religious faith led him to be involved with the World Alliance of YMCAs from 1947, and he was Chairman of the National Council of the YMCA in 1949. In 1954 he was elected to Orpington Urban District Council. Later he lived at Derhams House, near Minchinhampton, Gloucestershire.

== Parliament ==
In the 1955 general election, Cunningham was chosen as the new Ulster Unionist MP for South Antrim. He was a delegate to the Council of Europe and Western European Union Parliamentary Assembly from 1956 to 1959. He also served as Parliamentary Private Secretary to Jocelyn Simon, Financial Secretary to the Treasury, from 1958. In 1959 he was made a Queen's Counsel.

After the 1959 general election, Cunningham was picked by Prime Minister Harold Macmillan as his Parliamentary Private Secretary, responsible for the Prime Minister's relations with backbench Conservative MPs. He was also a member of the National Executive of the Conservative and Unionist Party. When Macmillan resigned, he awarded Cunningham a baronetcy in his resignation honours.

== Post-Parliamentary career ==
Cunningham remained on the backbenches, known as one to the right of Ulster Unionism and a friend of Ian Paisley, through the rest of the 1960s, he frequently clashed with Harold Wilson during this period, but decided to retire at the 1970 general election. He was Master of the Drapers Company in 1973–74. He was Provincial Grand Master of the Masonic Order in Gloucestershire from 1970 to 1976. He was a member of the Apprentice Boys Club in Derry and attended the 275th Anniversary of the Shutting of the Gates. Throughout his life he represented the old landed interests of Ulster and remained personally wealthy through family inheritance. He died suddenly at Derhams House, Minchinhampton on 29 July 1976 at the age of sixty-seven.

Military intelligence, the RUC and victims named Cunningham as a paedophile and identified his close links to the sex offender ring at Kincora Boys' Home, but MI5 denies this.

== Arms ==
Coat of arms of Knox Cunningham
Crest A unicorn's head couped or. Escutcheon Azure, a shake-fork between three mullets or. Motto Over fork over

== Sources ==
- M. Stenton and S. Lees, Who's Who of British MPs, vol. IV (Harvester Press, 1981).

Parliament of the United Kingdom
Preceded by Prof. Sir Douglas Savory	MP for South Antrim; 1955–1970	Succeeded by James Molyneaux
Government offices
Preceded by Anthony Barber	Parliamentary Private Secretary to the Prime Minister; 1959–1963	Succeeded by Francis Pearson
Baronetage of the United Kingdom
New creation	Baronet (of Crookedstone, Killead); 1963–1976	Extinct
