= Pappa Fourway =

Irish-bred Thoroughbred racehorse (1952–1978)

- Sire: Pappageno II
- Grandsire: Prince Rose
- Dam: Oola Hills
- Damsire: Denturius
- Sex: Colt
- Foaled: 1952
- Country: Ireland
- Colour: Bay
- Breeder: Ballykisteen Stud
- Owner: Mrs E. Goldson
- Trainer: Bill Dutton
- Record: 15: 12-1-1
- Earnings: £9,889

Major wins
- King's Stand Stakes (1955); July Cup (1955); Diadem Stakes (1955)

Awards
- Timeform Top-rated horse (1955); Timeform rating: 139
- Last updated on 19 February 2025

Pappa Fourway (1952–1978) was an Irish-bred, British-trained Thoroughbred racehorse and sire. He was one of the outstanding specialist sprinters of the twentieth century and one of the best horses trained in the north of England. After winning four times as a two-year-old in 1954 he was the dominant European sprinter of 1955 when he was undefeated in eight races, including the King's Stand Stakes, July Cup and Diadem Stakes. He was retired to stud in the United States and later Mexico, where he had modest success as a sire of winners.

== Background ==
Pappa Fourway was a powerfully built bay horse standing 16 hands high, bred in County Tipperary, Ireland, by the Ballykisteen Stud. He was sired by Pappageno, a stallion best known for stayers and National Hunt horses, including the Scottish Grand National winner Pappageno's Cottage. His dam was a mare named Oola Hills, who was the ancestor of Park Top, Lyric Fantasy and Royal Applause. As a yearling, Pappa Fourway was sent to the sales, where he was purchased for 150 guineas and entered into the ownership of Mrs Elaine Goldson. The colt went into training at William Parker "Bill" Dutton's Grove Cottage stable at Malton, North Yorkshire. Dutton (1901–1958) had been a successful amateur jockey, winning the 1928 Grand National on Tipperary Tim before training major winners in both flat and jump racing. He trained another outstanding sprinter in Right Boy and won the Cheltenham Gold Cup with Limber Hill.

== Racing career ==
=== 1954:two-year-old career ===
Pappa Fourway won four times from seven starts as a two-year-old. He won the Moulton Stakes, finished second in the Lavant Stakes at Goodwood, and was third in the Malton Stakes.

=== 1955:three-year-old career ===
Pappa Fourway began his second campaign by running in handicap races. He made his first appearance as a three-year-old in the Prince of Wales's Handicap at Chester on 3 May. Carrying a weight of 132 pounds he won by three lengths from thirteen opponents. Three weeks later, he was assigned a weight of 133 pounds in the Stewards' Stakes at Epsom and won by six lengths in a time of 55.4 seconds. On 31 May, Pappa Fourway won the Festival Stakes at Birmingham Racecourse by three lengths.

On 24 June, he carried a weight of 133 pounds in the Gosforth Park Cup at Newcastle Racecourse and won by three lengths from ten opponents. Five days later, Pappa Fourway was moved into top level weight-for-age competition in the July Cup at Newmarket. Such was the impression he had made in handicap races that only two horses appeared to oppose him and he won "easily" by two lengths from the 1954 winner Vilmoray and Royal Palm. In July, Pappa Fourway contested the King's Stand Stakes at Ascot and won by two lengths from Democratic, to whom he conceded fourteen pounds in weight. Pappa Fourway contracted a respiratory infection which affected many Yorkshire-trained horses in the summer of 1955, forcing him to miss the Nunthorpe Stakes

In autumn, Pappa Fourway returned to Ascot for the Diadem Stakes on 8 October. Only Trouville, the French-trained winner of the Cork and Orrery Stakes, opposed him and was beaten by six lengths. On his final racecourse appearance, Pappa Fourway won the Tetrarch Stakes at Manchester by two lengths. He had won 12 races worth £9,889 when he was exported to the United States in 1956.

== Stud career ==
Pappa Fourway stood as a stallion in America with limited success, siring twenty stakes winners including Pappas All (Arlington-Washington Futurity Stakes, Hollywood Juvenile Championship Stakes) and Dancing Pappa (runner-up in the Strub Stakes). He was exported to Mexico in 1970, where he sired stakes a number of winners.

== Assessment ==
Timeform awarded Pappa Fourway a rating of 139, the highest for any horse in 1955. The rating places Pappa Fourway as one of the best twenty horses since WWII.

In their book A Century of Champions, John Randall and Tony Morris rated Pappa Fourway the third-best British sprinter and the thirty-ninth best British racehorse of the 20th century.

== Pedigree ==
Pedigree of Pappa Fourway (IRE), bay stallion, 1952
Sire Pappageno	Prince Rose	Rose Prince	Prince Palatine
Sire Pappageno	Prince Rose	Rose Prince	Eglantine
Sire Pappageno	Prince Rose	Indolence	Gay Crusader
Sire Pappageno	Prince Rose	Indolence	Barrier
Sire Pappageno	Kassala	Cylgad	Cyllene*
Sire Pappageno	Kassala	Cylgad	Gadfly
Sire Pappageno	Kassala	Farizade	Sardanapale
Sire Pappageno	Kassala	Farizade	Diavolezza
Dam Oola Hills	Denturius	Gold Bridge	Golden Boss
Dam Oola Hills	Denturius	Gold Bridge	Flying Diadem
Dam Oola Hills	Denturius	La Solfatara	Lemberg*
Dam Oola Hills	Denturius	La Solfatara	Ayesha
Dam Oola Hills	Chikoo	Firdaussi	Pharos
Dam Oola Hills	Chikoo	Firdaussi	Brownhylda
Dam Oola Hills	Chikoo	Chor Bazar	Gainsborough
Dam Oola Hills	Chikoo	Chor Bazar	Voleuse(Family: 26)

* Pappa Fourway is inbred 4S x 5D to the stallion Cyllene, meaning that he appears fourth generation on the sire side of his pedigree and fifth generation (via Lemberg) on the dam side of his pedigree.
