= Mary Cunningham =

Mary Cunningham may refer to:

- Mary Ann Cunningham (1841–1930), Canadian temperance activist
- Mary B. Cunningham (1954–2025), Byzantinist and theologian
- Mary Cunningham, American competitor in Diving at the 1951 Pan American Games
- Mary Cunningham Agee (born 1951), American business executive and author
- Mary Cunningham (1842–1905), American wife of businessman and philanthropist Heber R. Bishop
- Mary Cunningham Bishop (1864–1948), American daughter of Heber R. Bishop
- Mary Cunningham Boyce, American engineering professor
- Mary Elizabeth Cunningham (1868–1939), Irish philanthropist and war worker
