= Senator Cunningham =

Senator Cunningham may refer to:

== Members of the Northern Irish Senate ==
- James Glencairn Cunningham (1903–1996), Northern Irish Senator from 1957 to 1965 and from 1967 to 1972
- Joseph Cunningham (Northern Ireland politician) (1877–1965), Northern Irish Senator from 1921 to 1965
- Samuel Cunningham (Northern Ireland politician) (1862–1946), Northern Irish Senator from 1921 to 1945

== United States state senate members ==
- Cal Cunningham (born 1973), North Carolina State Senate
- Charles Milton Cunningham (1877–1936), Louisiana State Senate
- Doug Cunningham (politician) (born 1954), Nebraska State Senate
- George Cunningham (Arizona politician) (born 1945), Arizona State Senate
- Glenn Cunningham (New Jersey politician) (1943–2004), New Jersey State Senate
- Jane Cunningham (born 1946), Missouri State Senate
- John E. Cunningham (born 1931), Washington State Senate
- Lawrence E. Cunningham (1852–1924), Wisconsin State Senate
- Milton Joseph Cunningham (1842–1916), Louisiana State Senate
- Russell McWhortor Cunningham (1855–1921), Alabama State Senate
- Sandra Bolden Cunningham (born 1950), New Jersey State Senate
- Sidney Cullingham (1896–1983), Nebraska State Senate
