= Ulsterman (newspaper) =

Defunct newspaper in Belfast, Northern Ireland

The Ulsterman
- The Ulsterman, 15 October 1858
- Type: Tri-weekly newspaper
- Owner: Denis Holland
- Editor: Denis Holland
- Founded: 17 November 1852
- Ceased publication: 1859
- Political alignment: Irish nationalism
- Language: English
- Headquarters: Belfast, Ireland, UK

The Ulsterman was a short lived tri-weekly nationalist four page newspaper based in Belfast in Ireland, UK.

First published on 17 November 1852 with Denis Holland, former editor of The Northern Whig as proprietor and editor. The paper closed in 1859 a year after Holland started concentrating on the weekly Irishman.
