= Pleasant View Farm =

Pleasant View Farm may refer to:

- Pleasant View Farm of the Hubbard Brook Experimental Forest, in New Hampshire
- Pleasant View Farm containing Samuel F. Glass House, Franklin, Tennessee, with a Mississippian culture archeological site
- Samuel Cunningham House, also known as Pleasant View Farm, near Hedgesville, Berkeley County, West Virginia
