= 1926 Grand National =

English steeplechase horse race

- Grand National
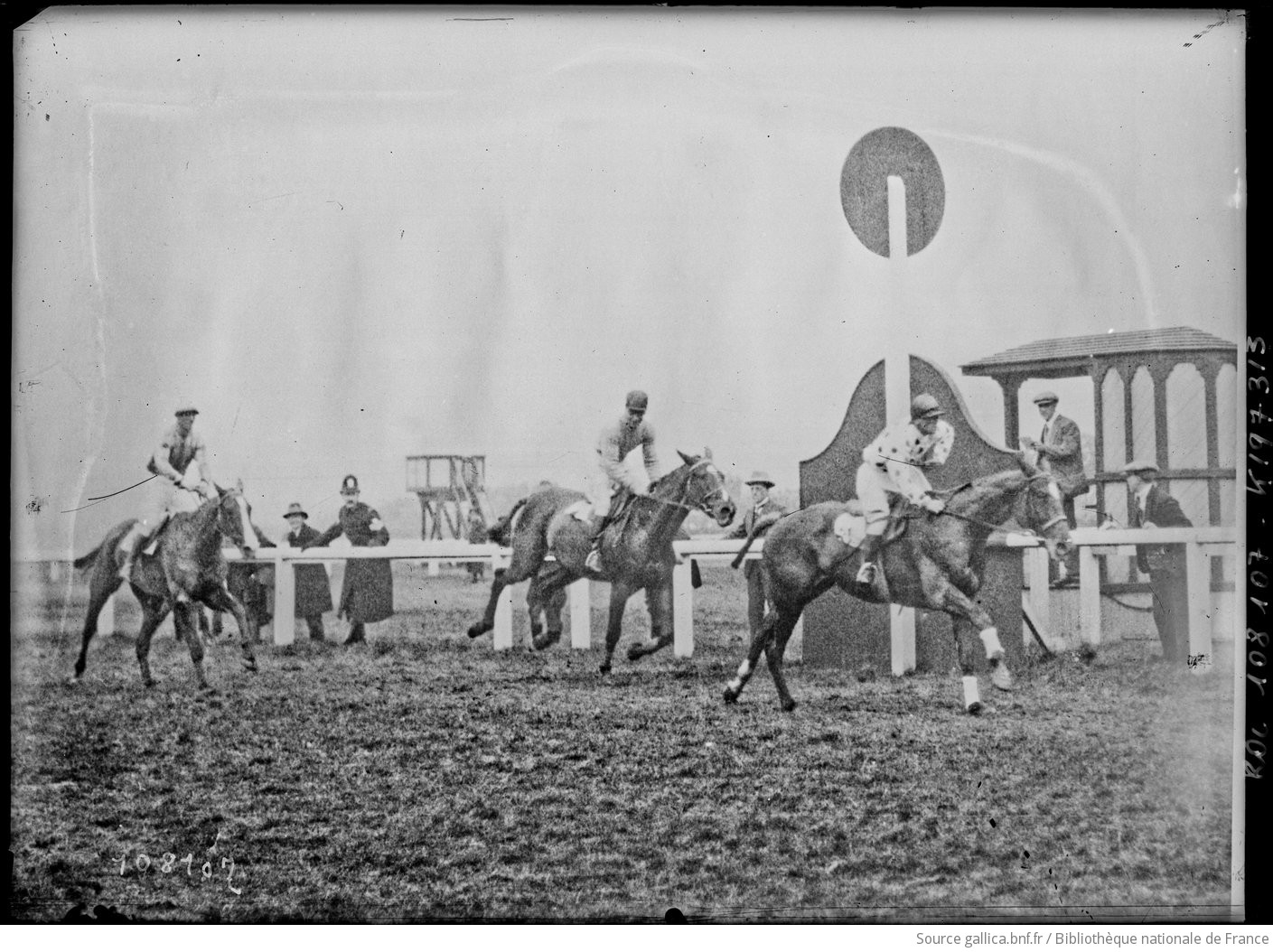
- Winner Jack Horner (right)
- Location: Aintree Racecourse
- Date: 26 March 1926
- Winning horse: Jack Horner
- Starting price: 25/1
- Jockey: (Australia) Billy Watkinson
- Trainer: Harvey Leader
- Owner: (United States) Charles Schwartz
- Conditions: Good to firm

External videos
- Silent highlights of the 1926 Grand National (British Pathé)

The 1926 Grand National was the 85th renewal of the Grand National horse race that took place at Aintree near Liverpool, England, on 26 March 1926.

The steeplechase was won by Jack Horner, a 25/1 bet ridden by jockey Billy Watkinson and trained by Harvey Leader for American owner Charles Schwartz, who had paid 5,000 guineas for him a week beforehand. Schwartz won £5,000 for the victory.

Harvey Leader was a brother of Ted Leader and son of Tom Leader.

Old Tay Bridge finished in second place for the second successive year, Bright's Boy was third and Sprig fourth. Sprig won the National the following year under Ted Leader.

Silvo and Grecian Wave – both well fancied runners – fell at the first fence. Irish favourite Knight of the Wilderness went at the third. At Becher's Brook, Lee Bridge fell and brought down Koko.

Thirty horses ran in the race and all but one returned safely to the stables. Lone Hand was fatally injured in a fall.

== Finishing Order ==
Position	Name	Jockey	Age	Handicap (st-lb)	SP	Distance
01	Jack Horner	William Watkinson	9	10-5	25/1	3 Lengths
02	Old Tay Bridge	Jack Anthony	12	12-2	8/1	
03	Bright's Boy	E Doyle	7	11-8	25/1	
04	Sprig	Ted Leader	9	11-7	5/1	
05	Darracq	Fred Gurney	11	10-11	40/1	

== Non-finishers ==
Fence	Name	Jockey	Age	Handicap (st-lb)	SP	Fate
?	Gerald L	Fred Brookes	12	12-2	40/1	?
?	Thrown In	Hon Hugh Grosvenor	10	10-11	33/1	?
?	Red Bee	D Behan	8	10-10	66/1	?
?	Dwarf of the Forest	Mr Harry Kennard	9	10-10	28/1	?
?	Master Billie	Eric Foster	7	10-0	20/1	?
?	Misconduct	Billy Parvin	7	10-0	28/1	?
?	Pop Ahead	S Regan Jnr	8	10-0	66/1	?
1	Silvo	Dick Rees	10	12-7	7/1	Fell
?	Ardeen	Robert Trudgill	9	11-9	33/1	Fell
?	Mount Etna	Mr Stratford Dennis	9	11-2	100/6	Fell
?	Ben Cruchan	Mr William Whitbread	12	11-2	66/1	Fell
6	Koko	Tim Hamey	8	11-1	100/8	Fell
3	Knight of the Wilderness	J Meaney	6	11-0	20/1	Fell
?	Patsey V	Major Cavenagh	12	10-9	66/1	Fell
?	Upton Lad	Bill Dutton	11	10-8	50/1	Fell
1	Grecian Wave	Major John Wilson	8	10-8	20/1	Fell
?	White Surrey	Farragher	14	10-7	66/1	Fell
6	Lee Bridge	Billy Stott	9	10-5	20/1	Fell
?	Test Match	Pat L'Estrange	8	10-5	66/1	Fell
?	Pencoed	Mr D Thomas	11	10-2	100/1	Fell
?	Lone Hand	Tommy Morgan	8	10-0	66/1	Fell
?	Jolly Glad	Mr P Dennis	9	10-1	50/1	Fell
?	Soldier Bill	Kenyon Goode	10	10-0	100/1	?
?	Wallsend	Captain H Lumsden	6	10-0	100/1	Fell
?	Cash Box	Mr R Read	9	10-0	66/1	Fell
