= James Glencairn Cunningham =

Northern Irish politician (1903–1996)

James Glencairn Cunningham OBE (1903–1996) was a unionist politician in Northern Ireland.

Cunningham was from an Ulster family; his father was Samuel Cunningham, and his brothers were Josias Cunningham, stockbroker, Dunlop McCosh Cunningham, owner of Murrays Tobacco Ltd and Sir Samuel Knox Cunningham, Bt., a barrister. All attended the Royal Belfast Academical Institution, and then Fettes College in Edinburgh.

During World War II, he served with the 8th Belfast regiment of the Royal Artillery Special Reserve, the 245 heavy Anti-Aircraft Regiment of the Royal Artillery and the 14th Army in Burma. His war included a stint helping against the blitz in London, operations in France, including being evacuated from Dunkirk. In 1945, he was awarded the OBE. He was also a member of the B Specials.

After the war, Cunningham became owner and managing director of the newspaper The Northern Whig. He served as President of the Ulster Unionist Council and, from 1957 to 1965 and 1967 to 1972, as an Ulster Unionist Party member of the Senate of Northern Ireland.

In 1979, Cunningham became a Patron of the Ulster Unionist Council and, around this time, retired from his other posts. He died in 1996.

Party political offices
Preceded by Jack Andrews	President of the Ulster Unionist Party; 1973?–1979	Succeeded by George Anthony Clark
