= Fernhill House =

Building in Belfast, Northern Ireland

Coordinates: 54°36′47.3″N 5°58′53.8″W

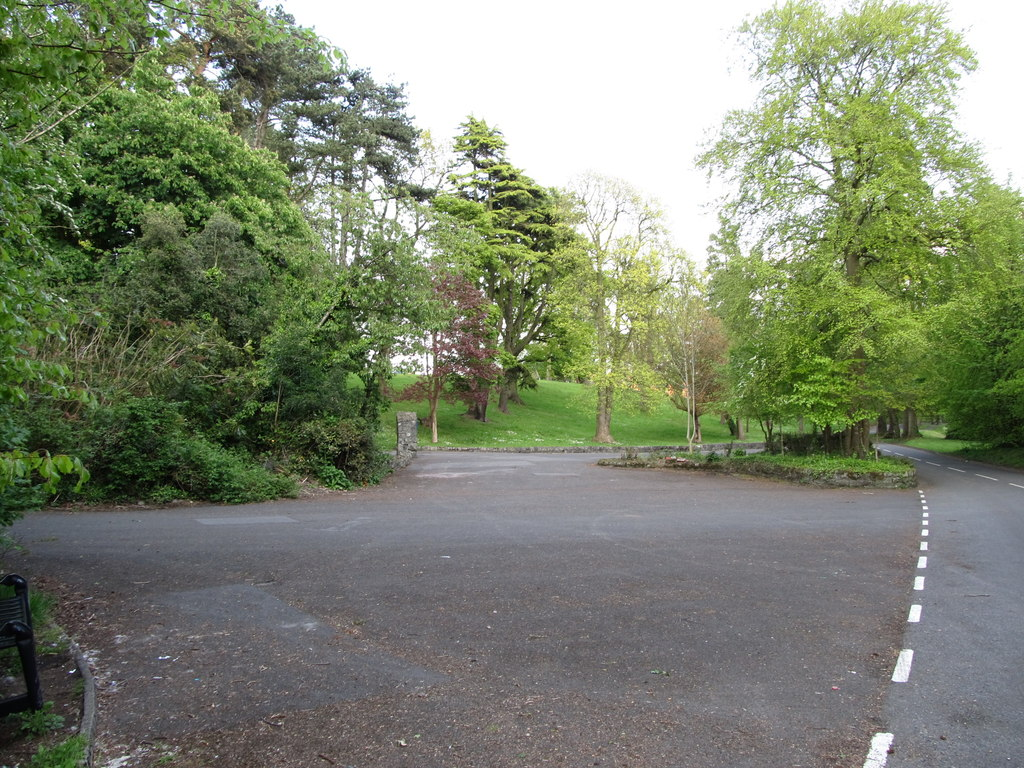
Former entrance to the house, now the park entrance

Fernhill House is a grade B2 listed building in Glencairn Road, Belfast. It was built in 1864 for the local butter merchant John Smith, with outbuildings added to the north in 1880. It was sold by Smith's family to businessman Samuel Cunningham in 1898. He was a staunch unionist who used the grounds to train members of the Ulster Volunteer Force and to store weapons during the 1912 Home Rule Crisis. Cunningham also kept racing horses in the house's stables, including Tipperary Tim, which won the 1928 Grand National. The estate was purchased by the Belfast Corporation in 1962 and opened to the public as Glencairn Park.

The house housed the municipal parks department between 1975 and 1990. Fernhill House was selected by the Combined Loyalist Military Command as the site for their 1994 ceasefire declaration, which presaged the 1998 Good Friday Agreement. From 1996 to 2008 the building housed a museum exhibiting items of local history, Ulster's military history and relating to the Orange Order. The building has since stood vacant and is listed as being at risk. The building and outbuildings were separately granted listed building protection in 2016.

== Description ==
Fernhill House is located on the east side of Glencairn Road in Belfast. It has an elevation of 300 feet (91 m) above sea level and enjoys views of the Mourne Mountains to the north and, across the North Channel, of the Scottish coast to the north-east. The house is approached from the south by a tree-lined avenue.

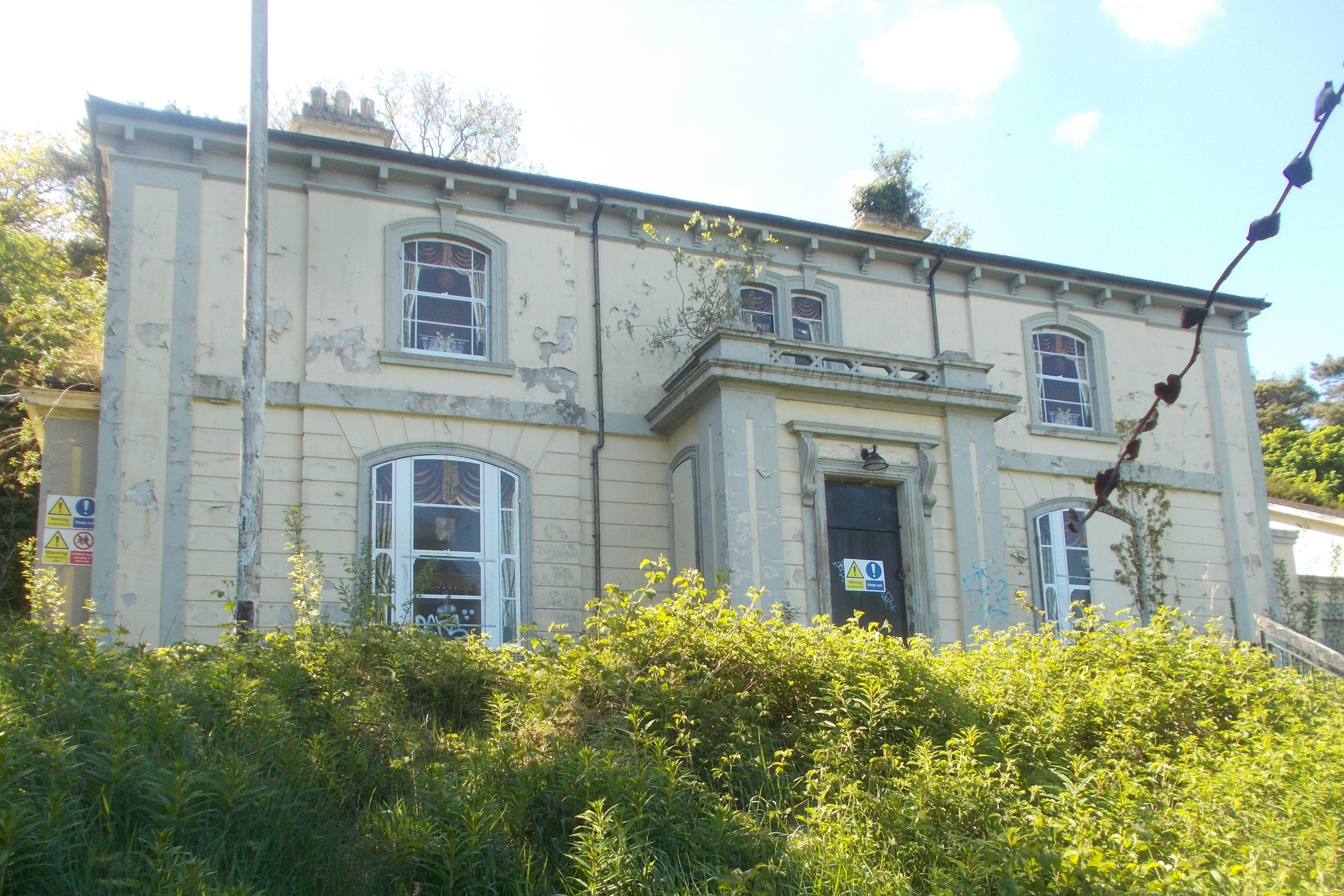
Fernhill House in 2025

Fernhill House is in the Neoclassic style. It is detached with the main, original, two-storey portion consisting of three bays. There is a later wing added to the south-west and a number of one- to two-storey extensions to the north. The entrance is via a one-storey flat-roofed porch in the centre of the east elevation of the original portion. The entrance steps are stone and the door is timber-panelled with a fanlight above. The entrance is detailed with cornices and a moulded door surround. The east elevation is symmetrical and fully rendered, in a rusticated fashion. It is detailed with decorative moulded bands and the whole is painted. The openings are generally segment-topped timber sash windows, with those on the upper storey having a prominent keystone detail. The roof is hipped with overhanging eaves with scrolled brackets. The chimneys are also rendered and detailed with string courses and moulded cornices. The guttering and downpipes are in modern uPVC. The south elevation has a ground-floor projection with a flat roof, detailed with cornicing. The south-east wing has a hipped, pyramidal slate roof. The north elevation has three windows, one on the ground floor and two on the first floor, that overlook the extensions. Original features such as window shutters and ornate interior ceiling roses and cornices are thought to survive.

A collection of outbuildings lie to the north, forming an enclosed courtyard. The west face is formed by a two-storey-long structure, the north by a three-bay single-storey structure adjoined to a three-bay single-storey structure that runs southwards and forms part of the east boundary. The remainder of the courtyard is formed by a rubble wall, with a gateway on the south. The outbuildings overlook the house on the south and Glencairn Park on the east. The roofs are not original and are made from slate. The eave overhang and the rafter ends are exposed. Guttering and downpipes are in uPVC, bargeboards are in timber. The windows of the outbuildings are generally square-topped with brick surrounds, though there are some segment-headed openings on the ground floor. The entire complex, including the house, is enclosed by a stone boundary wall to the west and north and metal fencing to east and south. It is surrounded by mature planting and vegetation which is overgrown on the west and north sides.

== History ==
Before the house was built the area was open countryside. Fernhill House was built by local butter merchant John Smith in 1864, it was likely designed by the Irish architect Robert Young. Shortly after construction it was valued at £65. Smith died on 16 November 1874 but the house remained in his family's possession. The outbuildings were added to the north around 1880.

=== Samuel Cunningham ===
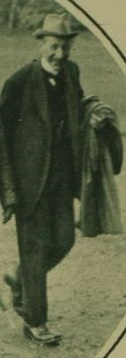
Cunningham, pictured in 1921

Smith's family sold the estate to local stockbroker and businessman Samuel Cunningham in 1898. Cunningham was chairman of the Northern Whig newspaper and a staunch unionist, a leading member of the Ulster Unionist Council. He sat in the Ulster Provisional Government from 1911 and in the Senate of Northern Ireland from 1921 to 1945. As well as Fernhill, Cunningham owned two other houses in the area, Glencairn House and Glendivis House. By the time of the 1901 census 14 rooms in the main house were occupied. Cunningham also made extensive use of the outbuildings including as a stable, coach house, harness room, cow and calf house, dairy, fowl house, boiling house, barn, shed and store. The stables were said to be well stocked with racehorses. One of Cunningham's horses, Tipperary Tim, won the 1928 Grand National at odds of 100/1.

Cunningham added the south west wing, designed by Thomas William Henry, to the main house around 1910. During the 1912 Home Rule Crisis the Ulster Volunteer Force (UVF) stored arms and ammunition in the house's stableyard. In June 1914 Sir Edward Carson reviewed a regiment of the UVF in the grounds of the house, many of these went on to serve in the British forces during the First World War. During the war the grounds were used to train recruits for the British Army's 36th (Ulster) Division.

=== Council ownership ===
The estate was bought by Belfast Corporation (after 1973 known as Belfast City Council) in 1962, and the grounds were afterwards opened to the public as Glencairn Park. At some point in the mid-1960s the house's gate lodge, a cruciform part-gabled and part-hipped roof structure, was demolished. The house was the home of Belfast Council's parks department between 1975 and 1990. The site was chosen as the location for the announcement of the 1994 loyalist ceasefire. This was announced by the UVF's Gusty Spence on behalf of the Combined Loyalist Military Command on 13 October. This presaged the 1998 Good Friday Agreement. The house opened as a community museum, run by the Glencairn People's Project, in 1996. It featured local history and the service of Ulstermen in the two world wars and also housed the world's largest collection of Orange Order memorabilia.

The museum closed in 2008 and the site has since lain vacant. It was last surveyed in 2014 when concern was raised over rot damaging the interior, which has been described as derelict. The site has been listed on the Register of Buildings at Risk in Northern Ireland because of risks to the structure. Local campaign group Ulster Architectural Heritage consider it has architectural and historic significance. On 24 March 2016 the house and the outbuildings were separately granted statutory protection as grade B2 listed buildings by the Northern Ireland Environment Agency (whose protection of historic buildings role transferred to the Department for Communities in May 2016). The buildings remain in the ownership of Belfast City Council who have no current plans for works but state they are open to opportunities with third parties to restore the site. The site was the focal point for celebrations for recent centennials of the First World War and the 75th anniversary of VE-Day in 2019. Local volunteers have occasionally helped to clean the buildings' exteriors. A local teenager became interested in the house after noticing it on walks taken during the 2020-2021 COVID-19 lockdowns and is leading a campaign for its restoration.
