= Samuel Cunningham (Northern Ireland politician) =

British businessman, stockbroker and politician

The Right Honourable Samuel Cunningham
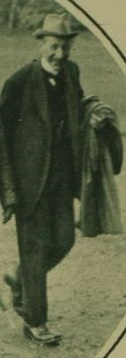
- Cunningham in 1921
- Born: 14 October 1862; Fernhill House, Glencairn, Belfast, Ireland
- Died: 23 August 1946 (aged 83)
- Occupations: Businessman, stockbroker, politician

Samuel Cunningham PC (Ire) (14 October 1862 – 23 August 1946) was a businessman, stockbroker and politician from Northern Ireland.

Cunningham was born at Fernhill House, Glencairn, Belfast, and educated at Belfast Academy and at Merchiston Castle School, Edinburgh. He became a stockbroker with his father Josias's firm in Belfast, but also acquired business interests, becoming chairman of The Northern Whig newspaper and the tobacco firm Murray Sons & Co Ltd. His sisters, Mary Elizabeth and Sarah Catherine, were heavily involved in the war effort in Belfast during World War I.

Cunningham was appointed to the Privy Council of Ireland in the 1920 New Year Honours following his membership of the Housing Committee on Finance, entitling him to the style "The Right Honourable". He was elected to the Senate of the Parliament of Northern Ireland on its formation in 1921 and served until 1945.

His sons were the politicians James Glencairn Cunningham and Sir Knox Cunningham, the stockbroker Josias Cunningham, and Dunlop McCosh Cunningham, who succeeded him at Murray's.

== See also ==
- Fernhill House
