= Mary Elizabeth Cunningham =

- Born: 28 January 1868; Glencairn, Belfast, County Antrim
- Died: 14 January 1939 (aged 70); Silver Springs, Templepatrick, County Antrim

Mary Elizabeth Cunningham CBE (28 January 1868 - 14 January 1939) was an Irish philanthropist and war worker, and founder of the Belfast Free Buffets and the Torpedoed Crews Fund.

== Biography ==
Mary Elizabeth Cunningham was born in Glencairn, Belfast, County Antrim on 28 January 1868. She was the fourth of eleven children of a prosperous stockbroker, Josias Cunningham, and Jane Agnes (née Davis). One of her brothers, Samuel Cunningham, became a partner in their father's business. Cunningham attended schools in Belfast and Edinburgh, developing an interest in the educational and social services of Belfast. She served as voluntary manager of the Forth River School, under the National School Board in Belfast, from 1895 to 1927. Along with her sister Sarah Catherine "Lallie" Cunningham (1873–1937), Cunningham came to prominence during World War I participating in numerous war work and efforts in Belfast.

She founded the Belfast Free Buffets in 1914, meeting the war wounded with refreshments as they arrived back in Belfast. She went on to found and manage Torpedoed Crews Fund which provided relief of the shipwrecked. She also worked with the Welcome Home Fund, acting as joint president, honorary secretary, and treasurer. From 1916 she was demonstrator with the St John Ambulance, as well as commanding a unit of the Voluntary Aid Detachment. Over the duration of the War, she raised thousands of pounds for the war effort. For her work during the War, Cunningham received a CBE in 1920. She was a fellow of the Royal Society of Antiquaries of Ireland and a life member of the Royal Ulster Agricultural Society.

Cunningham died after a long illness on 14 January 1939 at her sister's home at Silver Springs, Templepatrick, County Antrim.
