= Right Boy =

Irish-bred Thoroughbred racehorse (1954–1977)

- Sire: Impeccable
- Grandsire: His Highness
- Dam: Happy Ogan
- Damsire: Ballyogan
- Sex: Colt
- Foaled: 1954
- Country: Ireland
- Colour: Grey
- Breeder: W J Byrne
- Owner: Geoffrey Gilbert; David Wills
- Trainer: Bill Dutton; Pat Rohan (1959)
- Record: 29: 16-8-1
- Earnings: $53,212

Major wins
- King's Stand Stakes (1957); Nunthorpe Stakes (1958, 1959); July Cup (1958, 1959); King George Stakes (1958, 1959); Cork & Orrery Stakes (1958, 1959)

Awards
- Timeform rating: 137
- Last updated on 4 September 2025

Right Boy (1954–1977) was an Irish-bred, British-trained Thoroughbred racehorse and sire

== Background ==
Right Boy cost 575 guineas as a yearling. He was the second top sprinter of the 1950s to be trained in Yorkshire by Bill Dutton - the first was Pappa Fourway, who cost even less. When Dutton died in 1958, the horse was taken over by his late trainer's son-in-law Pat Rohan.

== Racing career ==
As a two-year-old Right Boy won his first four races against moderate opposition but was then unplaced behind Eudaemon in the Gimcrack Stakes. As a three-year-old he developed into a top-class sprinter, winning the King's Stand Stakes at Royal Ascot and finishing second in the Nunthorpe Stakes at York.

In 1958 he won six consecutive races, including the Cork and Orrery Stakes, July Cup, King George Stakes and Nunthorpe Stakes.

In his final season, Right Boy recorded repeat wins in the Cork & Orrery Stakes, July Cup, King George Stakes and Nunthorpe Stakes. He ended his racing career by finishing second, when attempting to concede thirty-two pounds to the winner, in the Portland Handicap at Doncaster.

== Stud record ==
At stud, the only notable winners he produced by the time he was put down in 1977 were Reet Lass, who won the Molecomb Stakes at Goodwood, and Village Boy, who landed the Richmond Stakes at the same course.

== Pedigree ==
Pedigree of Right Boy (IRE), grey stallion, 1954
Sire Impeccable (IRE) 1944	His Highness (GB); 1936	Hyperion	Gainsborough
Sire Impeccable (IRE) 1944	His Highness (GB); 1936	Hyperion	Selene
Sire Impeccable (IRE) 1944	His Highness (GB); 1936	Moti Ranee	Spion Kop
Sire Impeccable (IRE) 1944	His Highness (GB); 1936	Moti Ranee	Moti Mahal
Sire Impeccable (IRE) 1944	Mairi Bhan (GB); 1939	Mieuxce	Massine
Sire Impeccable (IRE) 1944	Mairi Bhan (GB); 1939	Mieuxce	L'Olivete
Sire Impeccable (IRE) 1944	Mairi Bhan (GB); 1939	Marie Dhu	Blandford
Sire Impeccable (IRE) 1944	Mairi Bhan (GB); 1939	Marie Dhu	Double Dutch
Dam Happy Ogan (GB) 1947	Ballyogan (GB); 1939	Fair Trial	Fairway
Dam Happy Ogan (GB) 1947	Ballyogan (GB); 1939	Fair Trial	Lady Juror
Dam Happy Ogan (GB) 1947	Ballyogan (GB); 1939	Serial	Solario
Dam Happy Ogan (GB) 1947	Ballyogan (GB); 1939	Serial	Booktalk
Dam Happy Ogan (GB) 1947	Content (GB); 1938	Sir Walter Raleigh	Prince Galahad
Dam Happy Ogan (GB) 1947	Content (GB); 1938	Sir Walter Raleigh	Smoke Lass
Dam Happy Ogan (GB) 1947	Content (GB); 1938	River Saint	Upsalquitch
Dam Happy Ogan (GB) 1947	Content (GB); 1938	River Saint	Saints Way (Family: 1-g)
