= Bill Dutton (trainer) =

British jockey and horse trainer

Personal information
- Born: 1901 Cheshire, England
- Died: 1958 (aged 56–57)
- Occupations: Jockey, Trainer

Horse racing career
- Sport: Horse racing

Significant horses
- Tipperary Tim, Pappa Fourway, Limber Hill, Right Boy.

William Parker Dutton (1901–1958) was a British jockey and Thoroughbred racehorse trainer.

== Background ==
Born into a Cheshire farming family, Dutton graduated from Cambridge University and studied to become a solicitor before opting to pursue a career in horse racing.

== Riding career ==
In the 1920s he rode as an amateur jockey in National Hunt races. In 1928 he recorded his most notable success when winning the Grand National on the 100/1 outsider Tipperary Tim.

== Training career ==
Dutton began training racehorses in 1932, setting up a stable at Hednesford in Staffordshire. His training career was suspended during World War II, when he served in the Royal Army Service Corps.

After the war he resumed training, basing his stable at Grove Cottage at Malton, North Yorkshire. He established himself as a leading trainer in the North of England, with a reputation for winning big races with inexpensively-bought horses. In 1953, he paid 150 guineas for a yearling colt on behalf of Mrs Elaine Goldson. Named Pappa Fourway, the colt became one of the best British sprinters of the 20th century, winning the King's Stand Stakes, July Cup and Diadem Stakes in 1955. In 1955 Dutton paid 575 guineas for the yearling Right Boy who became his second champion sprinter, winning the Cork and Orrery Stakes, July Cup and Nunthorpe Stakes. Amongst his other major winners were Childe Harold who won the Great Voltigeur Stakes in 1952 and the Yorkshire Cup in the following year and the 1957 Cesarewitch winner Sandiacre. Dutton was also a very successful trainer of National Hunt horses, sending out the nine-year-old gelding Limber Hill to win the King George VI Chase in 1955 and the Cheltenham Gold Cup in 1956.

Dutton was at the height of his success as a trainer when he died in 1958. His stable was taken over by his son-in-law Pat Rohan.
