= Koko (horse) =

Irish-bred Thoroughbred racehorse

- Sire: Santoi
- Grandsire: Queen's Birthday
- Dam: Persister
- Damsire: Persimmon
- Sex: Gelding
- Foaled: 1918
- Country: Ireland
- Colour: Bay
- Owner: Frank Barbour; Frederick Guest
- Trainer: Alfred Bickley

Major wins
- Cheltenham Gold Cup (1926)

Koko (foaled 1918) was an Irish racehorse who won the 1926 Cheltenham Gold Cup. He finished third in the race in 1928 when odds-on favourite and fell in 1929. He also ran twice without success in the Grand National.

== Background ==
Koko was a bay gelding bred in Ireland. He was sired by Santoi a top-class flat stayer who won the Ascot Gold Cup in 1901 before becoming a leading National Hunt sire. Koko's dan Persister was a daughter of The Derby winner Persimmon and a half-sister to Fiona, an influential broodmare whose descendants included Native Dancer.

Koko was owned by Frank Barbour a linen manufacturer whose horses where trained at Trimblestown in County Meath although they were moved to a base at Tarporley in Cheshire when competing in England. The training of the horse was managed by his owner although the day-to-day handling was done by his assistant Alfred Bickley who was the trainer of record.

== Racing career ==
Koko was sent to England in the early part of 1926 with the Cheltenham Gold Cup as his objective but jumped poorly in his prep race at Sandown Park Racecourse. At Cheltenham on 9 March he was ridden by Tim Hamey and started a 10/1 outsider in an eight-runner field for the third running of the Gold Cup. Ruddyglow started the 6/5 favourite whilst the other runners included Old Tay Bridge (runner-up in the 1925 Grand National) and Gerald L (third in the 1924 Gold Cup). Hamey allowed the gelding to set the pace from the start and Koko was never in any danger of defeat, winning easily by four lengths from Old Tay Bridge, with Ruddyglow five lengths back in third place. Barbour was presented with a 15 carat gold trophy cup, made by Edward Barnard & Sons Ltd.

Seventeen days later Koko started the 100/8 fourth favourite for the 1926 Grand National but fell at Becher's Brook on the first circuit. Tim Hamey reportedly sustained a concussion in the fall.

Koko returned to Cheltenham in 1928 and started 4/5 favourite for the Gold Cup. He led for most of the way and looked the likely winner even when joined at the last by Patron Saint but broke a blood vessel on the run-in and dropped back to finish third. After the race Koko was sold by Barbour to Frederick Guest. In the Grand National he again fell at Becher's Brook and landed in the ditch on the landing side of the fence where he became wedged. His jockey W. Gurney said "Koko hit the fence just above the bar and turned clean over into the ditch. I thought he had broken his back but he was all right. He had to be pulled out with ropes."

The gelding returned to Cheltenham for a third attempt at the Gold Cup in 1929 but jumped poorly before falling at the water jump. He continued to compete in minor National Hunt meetings but never contested another top class race.

== Assessment and honours ==
In their book, A Century of Champions, based on the Timeform rating system, John Randall and Tony Morris rated Koko an "inferior" Gold Cup winner.

== Pedigree ==
Pedigree of Koko (IRE), bay gelding, 1918
Sire Santoi (GB) 1897	Queen's Birthday (GB); 1887	Hagioscope	Speculum
Sire Santoi (GB) 1897	Queen's Birthday (GB); 1887	Hagioscope	Sophia
Sire Santoi (GB) 1897	Queen's Birthday (GB); 1887	Matilda	Beauclerc
Sire Santoi (GB) 1897	Queen's Birthday (GB); 1887	Matilda	Simony
Sire Santoi (GB) 1897	Merry Wife (GB); 1891	Merry Hampton	Hampton*
Sire Santoi (GB) 1897	Merry Wife (GB); 1891	Merry Hampton	Doll Tearsheet
Sire Santoi (GB) 1897	Merry Wife (GB); 1891	Connie	Pero Gomez
Sire Santoi (GB) 1897	Merry Wife (GB); 1891	Connie	Hilarity
Dam Persister (GB) 1903	Persimmon (GB); 1893	St Simon	Galopin
Dam Persister (GB) 1903	Persimmon (GB); 1893	St Simon	St Angela
Dam Persister (GB) 1903	Persimmon (GB); 1893	Perdita	Hampton*
Dam Persister (GB) 1903	Persimmon (GB); 1893	Perdita	Hermione
Dam Persister (GB) 1903	Sister Ann (GB); 1888	Edward the Confessor	Hermit
Dam Persister (GB) 1903	Sister Ann (GB); 1888	Edward the Confessor	The Princess of Wales
Dam Persister (GB) 1903	Sister Ann (GB); 1888	Anlace	Tomahawk
Dam Persister (GB) 1903	Sister Ann (GB); 1888	Anlace	Annette (Family 5-f)

* Koko is inbred 4S x 4D to the stallion Hampton, meaning that he appears fourth generation on the sire side of his pedigree and fourth generation on the dam side of his pedigree.
