= Mary B. Cunningham =

Mary B. Cunningham (1954–2025) was a scholar of Byzantine history and theology. She was 'one of the world's leading authorities on the Mother of God in the Byzantine and Orthodox Christian tradition'. She was Honorary Associate Professor of Historical Theology at the University of Nottingham.

== Education ==
Cunningham studied Church History at Harvard University, learning medieval Greek from Ihor Ševčenko. Cunningham was 'one of the two best students he ever had.' She completed an MA and then PhD in Byzantine Studies at the University of Birmingham. Her doctoral thesis was Andreas of Crete's Homilies on Lazarus and Palm Sunday: A Critical Edition and Commentary. Her PhD was awarded in 1983.

== Career ==
Cunningham began teaching at various universities in 1984, including Queen's University Belfast, King's College London and the University of Birmingham. She joined the Department of Theology and Religious Studies at the University of Nottingham in 2006. She retired from undergraduate teaching in 2016, but continued to research and write.

Cunningham's most important work has been on the doctrinal history, devotional piety, and liturgical celebration of the Virgin Mary. She published an English translation of the Greek text, The life of Michael the Synkellos, in 1991. She published the first English (or indeed any modern) translation of two early ninth-century hagiographical texts that deal with the Virgin Mary and the apostle Andrew in 2024. This includes the earliest attempt by a Greek-speaking author to provide a full-length biography of Mary.

Cunningham was Vice-President of the Society for the Promotion of Byzantine Studies. She was a joint fellow in Athens and at Dumbarton Oaks1983-84, and then a Fellow at Dumbarton Oaks 2015-16.

The University of Birmingham held a Tribute to her life and scholarship in June 2026.

== Personal life ==
Cunningham met and married her husband, Richard Corran during the completion of her graduate work at Birmingham. They have two children.

== Bibliography ==
- Epiphanios the Monk. Life of Mary, the Theotokos, and Life and Acts of St Andrew the Apostle (Liverpool: Liverpool University Press, 2024)
- The Virgin Mary in Byzantium, c. 400–1000. Hymns, homilies and hagiography (Cambridge: Cambridge University Press, 2022)
- (with Thomas Arentzen), eds., The Reception of the Virgin in Byzantium. Marian Narratives in Texts and Images (Cambridge University Press, 2019)
- Gateway of Life: Thinking on the Mother of God (St Vladimir's Seminary Press, 2015)
- (authored with Leslie Brubaker) ‘Byzantine veneration of the Theotokos: icons, relics, and eighth-century homilies’, From Rome to Constantinople: Studies in Honour of Averil Cameron, ed. by H. Amirav and B. Ter Haar Romeny (Leuven: P. Peeters, 2007) 235–50
- (ed. with Pauline Allen) Preacher and Audience: Studies in Early Christian and Byzantine Homiletics (Leiden: Brill, 1998)
- (ed. with A. A. M. Bryer) Mount Athos and Byzantine Monasticism (Aldershot: Ashgate Publishing, 1996)
