= Samuel Cunningham House =

Historic house in West Virginia, United States

- U.S. National Register of Historic Places
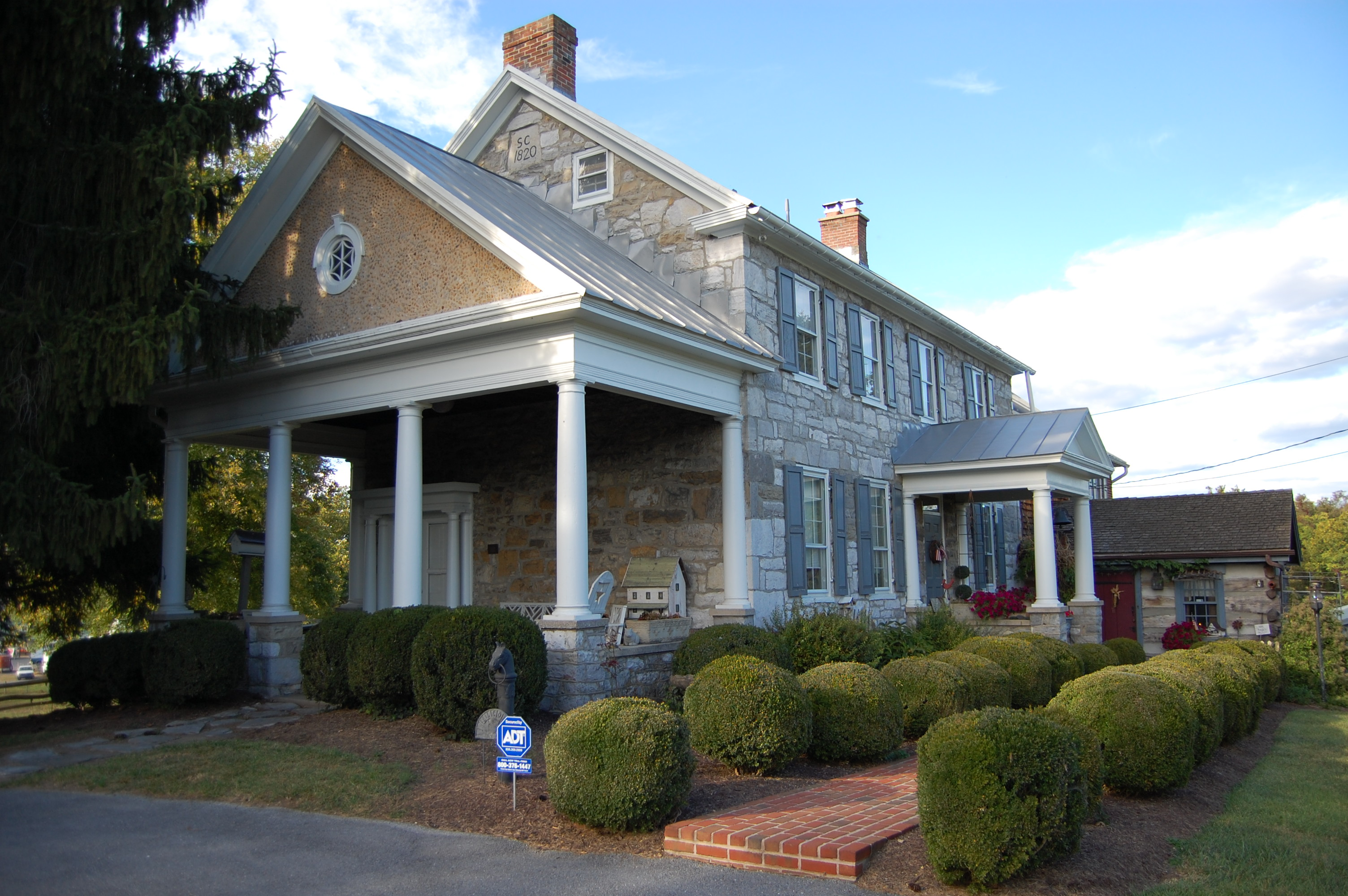

- Location within West Virginia Location within the United States
- Location: Southeast of Hedgesville off WV 9, near Hedgesville, West Virginia
- Coordinates: 39°31′45″N 77°58′46″W
- Area: 3 acres (1.2 ha)
- Built: 1820
- Architect: Cunningham, Samuel; Cunningham, William
- Architectural style: Colonial Revival
- NRHP reference No.: 76001930
- Added to NRHP: December 12, 1976

Samuel Cunningham House, also known as Pleasant View Farm, is a historic home located near Hedgesville, Berkeley County, West Virginia. It was built in 1820 and is a two-story, eight-bay, gable roofed stone and brick house. The house was expanded about 1840 and a Colonial Revival style porch was added in the early 20th century. Also on the property is a brick smoke house.

It was listed on the National Register of Historic Places in 1976.
