= Tipperary Tim =

Irish Thoroughbred racehorse

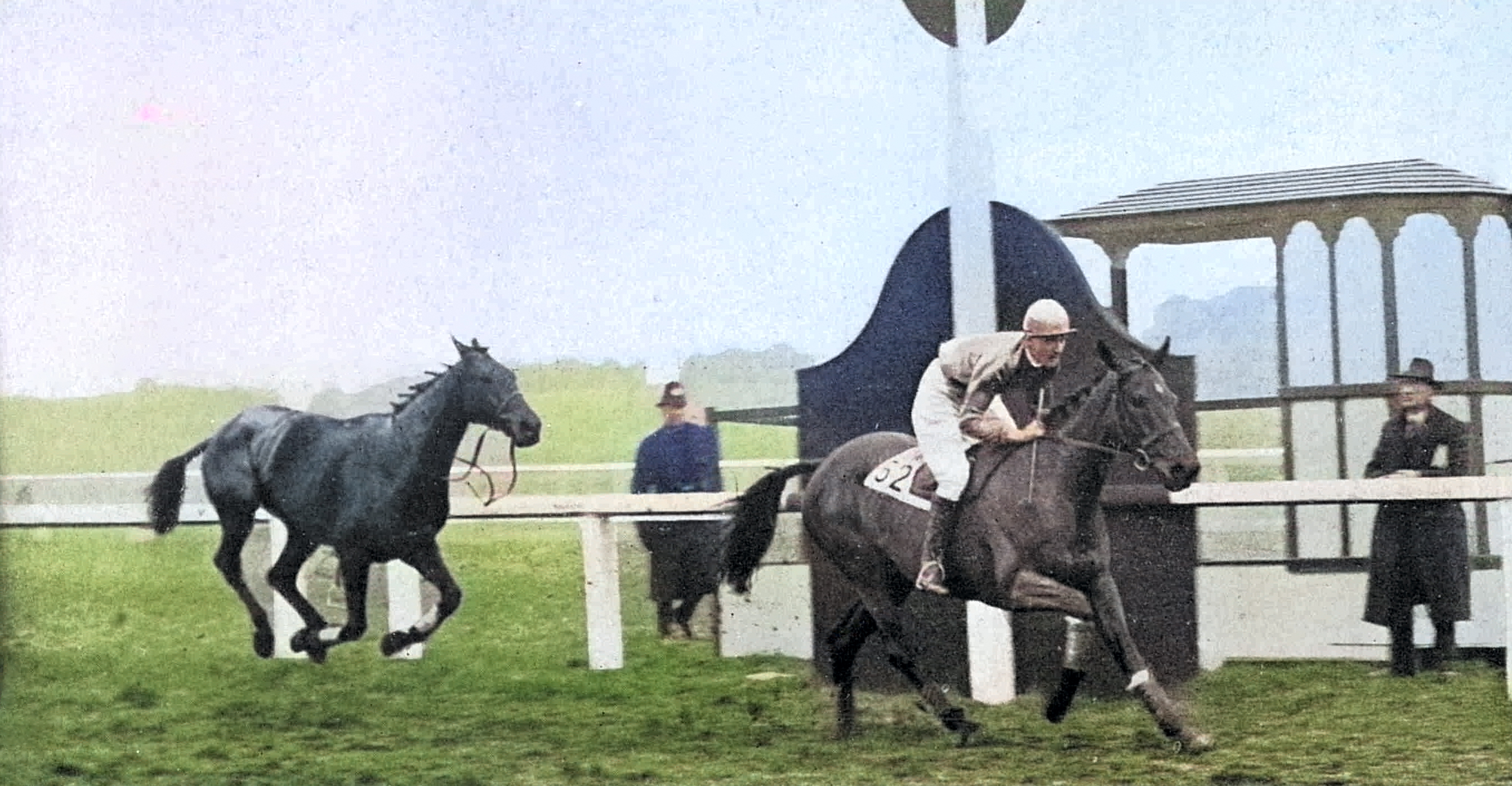
- Tipperary Tim winning 1928 Grand National with riderless Great Span behind.
- Sire: Cipango
- Grandsire: St Frusquin
- Dam: Last Lot
- Damsire: Noble Chieftain
- Sex: Gelding
- Foaled: 1918, Ireland
- Died: May 1935
- Country: Ireland
- Color: Brown
- Breeder: Jack Ryan
- Owner: Harold Kenyon
- Trainer: Joseph Dodd

Major wins
- 1928 Grand National

Tipperary Tim (1918 – May 1935) was an Irish Thoroughbred racehorse that won the 1928 Grand National. He was foaled in Ireland and was a descendant of the undefeated St. Simon. Tipperary Tim was owned by Harold Kenyon and trained in Shropshire by Joseph Dodd. He was regarded as a fairly slow horse, but one who rarely fell. Tipperary Tim was a 100–1 outsider at the 42-runner 1928 Grand National, which was run in foggy conditions and very heavy going. A pile-up occurred at the Canal Turn jump that reduced the field to just seven horses. Other falls and incidents left only Tipperary Tim and the 33-1 Billy Barton in the race. Billy Barton struck the last fence and fell, leaving Tipperary Tim to win – Billy Barton's jockey remounted and finished a distant second (and last). The incident led to controversy in the press who complained that a Grand National should not be won merely by avoiding accident. It led to changes to the course with the ditch at Canal Turn being removed for the following year's race. Tipperary Tim enjoyed no real success in other races.

== Early life ==
Tipperary Tim was foaled in Ireland in 1918, his breeder was Jack Ryan. Tipperary Tim's sire was the British horse Cipango and his dam was the Irish horse Last Lot, his grandsire was the British horse St Frusquin (who had been sired by the undefeated St. Simon) and his damsire was British horse Noble Chieftain. He belonged to Thoroughbred family 19-b. The stud fee paid for Cipango was just £3 5s (equivalent to £189 in 2023). Tipperary Tim was named after a local marathon runner, Tim Crowe. He was a brown-coloured gelding. Tipperary Tim had been sold as a yearling for £50 (equivalent to £2,902 in 2023) and was said to have once been given as a present.

Tipperary Tim came into the ownership of Harold Kenyon. He was trained in Shropshire by Joseph Dodd who noted that "he never falls". By other reports he was capable of only one pace, and that a relatively slow one. Tipperary Tim was tubed, that is he received a permanent tracheotomy, with a brass tube halfway down his neck to improve his breathing. He was stabled at Fernhill House in Belfast. Tipperary Tim competed at Aintree in the November 1927 Molyneux Steeplechase.

== 1928 Grand National ==
Tipperary Tim was entered into the 1928 Grand National at the age of 10 years. He was ridden by amateur jockey Bill Dutton, a Cambridge-educated solicitor from Chester, who had left the profession to pursue horse-riding. Tipperary Tim was a 100–1 outsider and Dutton later recalled that a friend had told him before the race: "you'll only win if all the others fall".

The field in 1928 was the largest to date with 42 runners starting the race. The going was very heavy and there was a dense fog. There were three false starts, after which the broken starting tape had to be knotted together. On the first circuit of the Aintree track the leader, one of the favourites, Easter Hero, mistimed the Canal Turn jump. Rising too early he was stranded briefly on the fence before becoming trapped in the ditch, which preceded it. The next three horses, Grokle, Darracq and Eagle's Tail were brought down by Easter Hero. Of the remaining runners (22 remained in the race), twenty refused to jump the fence. The pile-up was described by racing historian Reg Green as "the worst ever seen on a racecourse". Only seven horses with seated jockeys emerged from the incident to continue the race. One of these was Tipperary Tim as Dutton had chosen to take a wide route around the outside of the course, avoiding hazards that had brought down other jockeys. Because of the fog the majority of the audience were unaware of the incident at Canal Turn.

By the second jumping of Becher's Brook only five horses remained in the race with Billy Barton leading ahead of May King, Great Span, Tipperary Tim and Maguelonne. Maguelonne was still trailing at the first fence following Valentine's Brook where it fell. May King fell shortly afterwards before Great Span lost his saddle and rider, leaving only Billy Barton, who started with 33–1 odds, and Tipperary Tim. Billy Barton had led the race for 2.5 miles (4.0 km) until the last fence where Tipperary Tim drew level. The riderless Great Span was between them and may have slightly hindered Billy Barton. Billy Barton struck the final fence with his forelegs and fell, dismounting his rider, Tommy Cullinan. Tipperary Tim came in first, with a time of 10 minutes 23.40 seconds, he was closely followed by the riderless Great Span; a remounted Billy Barton came a distant second and was the last to finish.

With only two horses completing the race the 1928 Grand National set a second record, for the fewest finishers. Tipperary Tim was the only horse to have completed the race without falling or unseating its rider. Kenyon received prize money of 5,000 sovereigns as well as a cup worth 2,000 sovereigns. Tipperary Tim became one of the biggest outsiders to win the Grand National, only four other horses with odds of 100–1 have won the race: Gregalach in 1929, Caughoo in 1947, Foinavon in 1967. and Mon Mome in 2009.

There were scathing reports in the press, which described the race as "burlesque steeplechasing", and many writers stated that a Grand National should not be won merely by avoiding an accident. The race inspired some to become involved in the sport. The future horse racing commentator Peter O'Sullevan laid his first ever bet on Tipperary Tim and cited it as the start of his life-long connection with racing. The Pathé footage of the race inspired a young Beltrán Alfonso Osorio to aspire to a career in racing. He became an amateur jockey who rode at the 1952 Grand National and others thereafter.

== Later history ==
The success of Tipperary Tim led to larger fields in the following Grand Nationals. According to racing historian T. H. Bird "everyone who owned a steeplechaser that could walk aspired to win the Grand National", leading to more entries which, Bird lamented, "cluttered" the field with "rubbish". The 1929 Grand National started with 66 runners, including Tipperary Tim who, despite his success the previous year, remained a 100-1 outsider. The ditch at the Canal Turn had been removed before this race, as a result of the incident in 1928. Tipperary Tim fell during the 1929 race and did not finish. The horse enjoyed no real success aside from his 1928 Grand National win. Tipperary Tim died in May 1935 and was buried at Whitchurch, Cheshire.
