= Jack Horner (racehorse) =

British-bred Thoroughbred racehorse

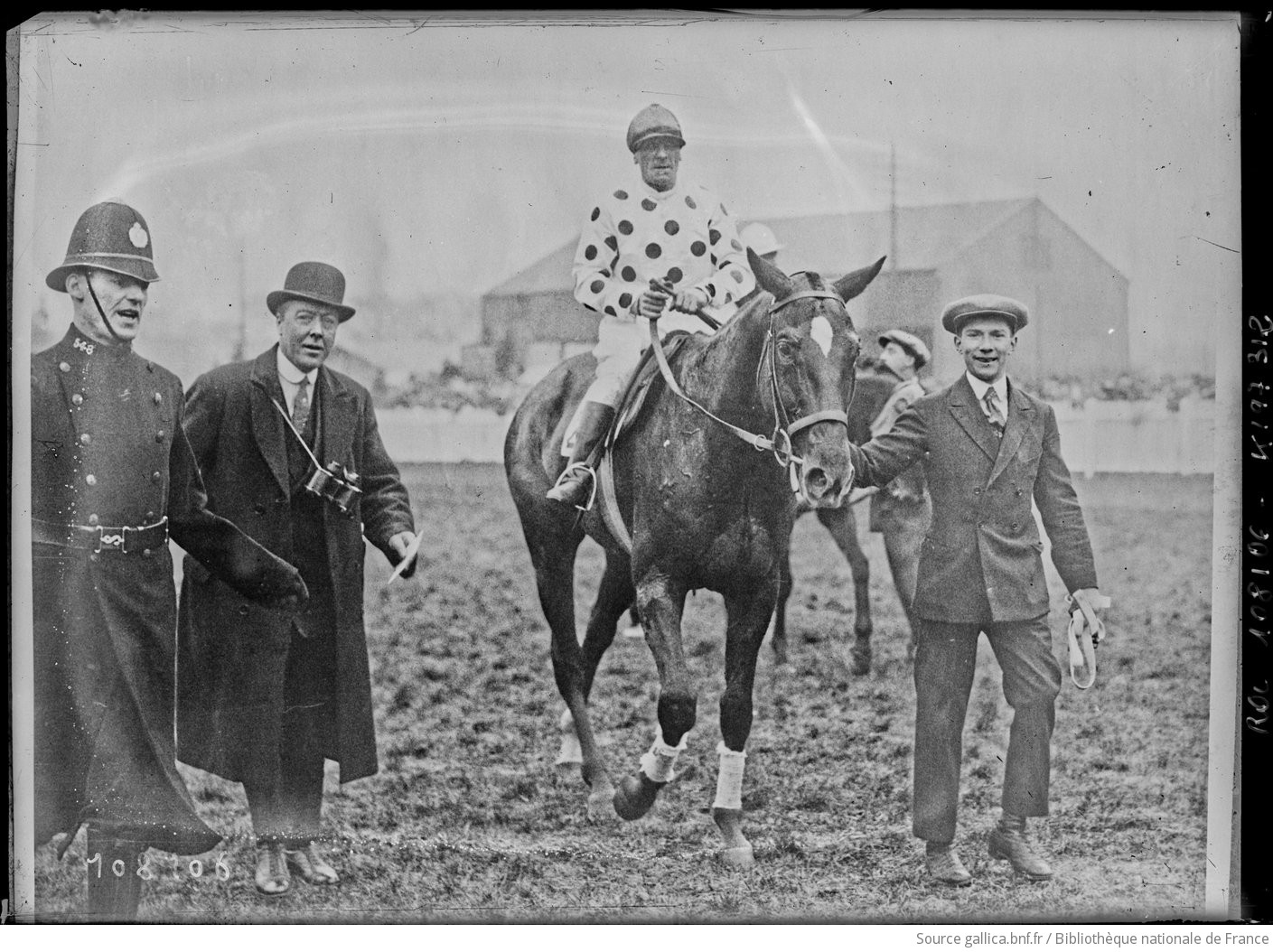
- Grand National (1926, Aintree)
- Sire: Cyllius
- Grandsire: Cyllene
- Dam: Meltons Guide
- Damsire: Melton
- Sex: Gelding
- Foaled: 1917
- Country: United Kingdom
- Colour: Chestnut
- Breeder: John Musker
- Owner: Charles Schwartz
- Trainer: Harvey Leader

Major wins
- Grand National (1926)

Jack Horner (foaled 1917 by Cyllius out of Meltons Guide) was a British Thoroughbred race horse who won the 1926 Grand National.

== Background ==
A week before the Grand National Mr. A.C. Schwartz bought Jack Horner for 5,000 guineas. He had previously finished seventh in the 1925 running of the race when ridden by the American amateur Morgan de Witt Blair.

== Grand National ==
In 1926, ridden by the Tasmanian jockey William Watkinson, Jack Horner started at odds of 25/1 in a field of thirty runners. The gelding took the lead in the closing stages and won by three lengths from Old Tay Bridge. Watkinson, who received £4,000 from the winning owner, was killed in a fall at Bogside Racecourse three weeks later.

== Retirement ==
Jack Horner sustained a serious injury in training shortly afterwards and was retired without competing again.
