= Murray, Sons and Company =

Former Northern Irish tobacco manufacturer

Murray, Sons and Company, Ltd.
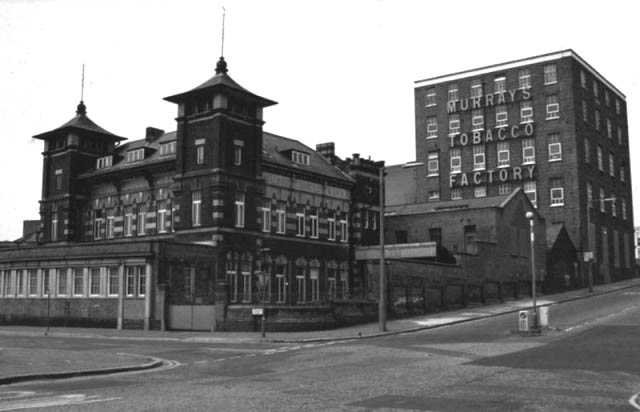
- Murray's Tobacco Factory, Belfast
- Type: Subsidiary
- Industry: Tobacco
- Founded: 1810
- Defunct: 2005; 21 years ago
- Fate: Acquired by British American Tobacco, factory closed
- Headquarters: Belfast, N. Ireland
- Products: Cigarettes
- Number of employees: 63 (2005)
- Parent: British American Tobacco

Murray, Sons and Company Ltd was a tobacco manufacturing company based in Belfast, Northern Ireland. The company traded under its own name but under various ownerships, from its foundation in 1810 until closure in 2005.

== History ==
Murray, Sons and Company Ltd began trading in Belfast in 1810, and became a limited company in 1884. By 1921, it shared most of the Belfast manufacture of tobacco, cigarettes, and snuff with Gallaher Limited, who had moved to Belfast in 1867.

Dunlop McCosh Cunningham took over the running of the works in the mid-1920s from his uncle. The firm produced the Erinmore and Yachtsman Navy Cut brands, though the cigarettes were not the superior quality that the pipe tobacco proved to be. The firm produced high quality popular pipe tobacco. For a time in the 1970s, the managing director was Belfast man Mr Gleghorne and his personal assistant was Mrs Elizabeth Iris McDowell (née Hillock)

=== Acquisition ===
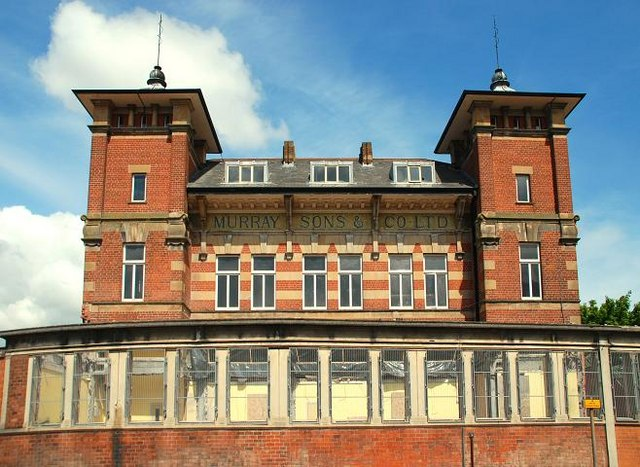
Former factory building, pictured in June 2009

In 1953, Murray, Sons and Company Ltd was acquired from Dunlop McCosh Cunningham by London-based Carreras Tobacco, which following the sale of shares in 1958 by the Baron family, merged with Rothman's of Pall Mall to become Carreras Rothmans Limited. Carreras Rothmans became known as Rothmans International in 1972.

In June 1999, Rothmans International was acquired by British American Tobacco.

=== Closure ===
In 2004, British American Tobacco announced the possible closure of Murray, Sons and Company Ltd and began a consultation process to review the plant's future. The company's fate was announced in January 2005, with the loss of 63 jobs.

== Brands ==
Throughout its trading life, Murray Sons and Company Ltd manufactured various brands of tobacco products including pipe tobacco:

- Craven
- Dunhill
- Erinmore
- Yachtsman Navy Cut
