= 1928 Grand National =

English steeplechase horse race

- Grand National
- Location: Aintree Racecourse
- Date: 30 March 1928
- Winning horse: (Republic of Ireland) Tipperary Tim
- Starting price: 100/1
- Jockey: (England) Mr. William Dutton
- Trainer: Joseph Dodd
- Owner: Harold Kenyon
- Conditions: Very heavy (soft in places)

External videos
- Silent highlights of the 1928 Grand National (British Pathé)

The 1928 Grand National was the 87th renewal of the Grand National horse race that took place at Aintree Racecourse near Liverpool, England, on 30 March 1928.

Before the race, Tipperary Tim's amateur jockey, William Dutton, heard a friend call out to him, "Billy boy, you'll only win if all the others fall!" And they did, as all of the 41 other starters fell during the race.

The 1928 National was run during misty weather conditions with the going very heavy. As the field approached the Canal Turn on the first circuit, Easter Hero fell, causing a pile-up from which only seven horses emerged with seated jockeys. By the penultimate fence this number had reduced to three, with Great Span leading ahead of Billy Barton and Tipperary Tim. Great Span's saddle then slipped, leaving Billy Barton in the lead until he too fell. Although Billy Barton's jockey Tommy Cullinan managed to remount and complete the race, it was Tipperary Tim who came in first at outside odds of 100/1. The 10-year-old was trained by Joseph Dodd for its owner, Harold Kenyon.

With only two riders completing the course, 1928 set the record for the fewest finishers in a Grand National.

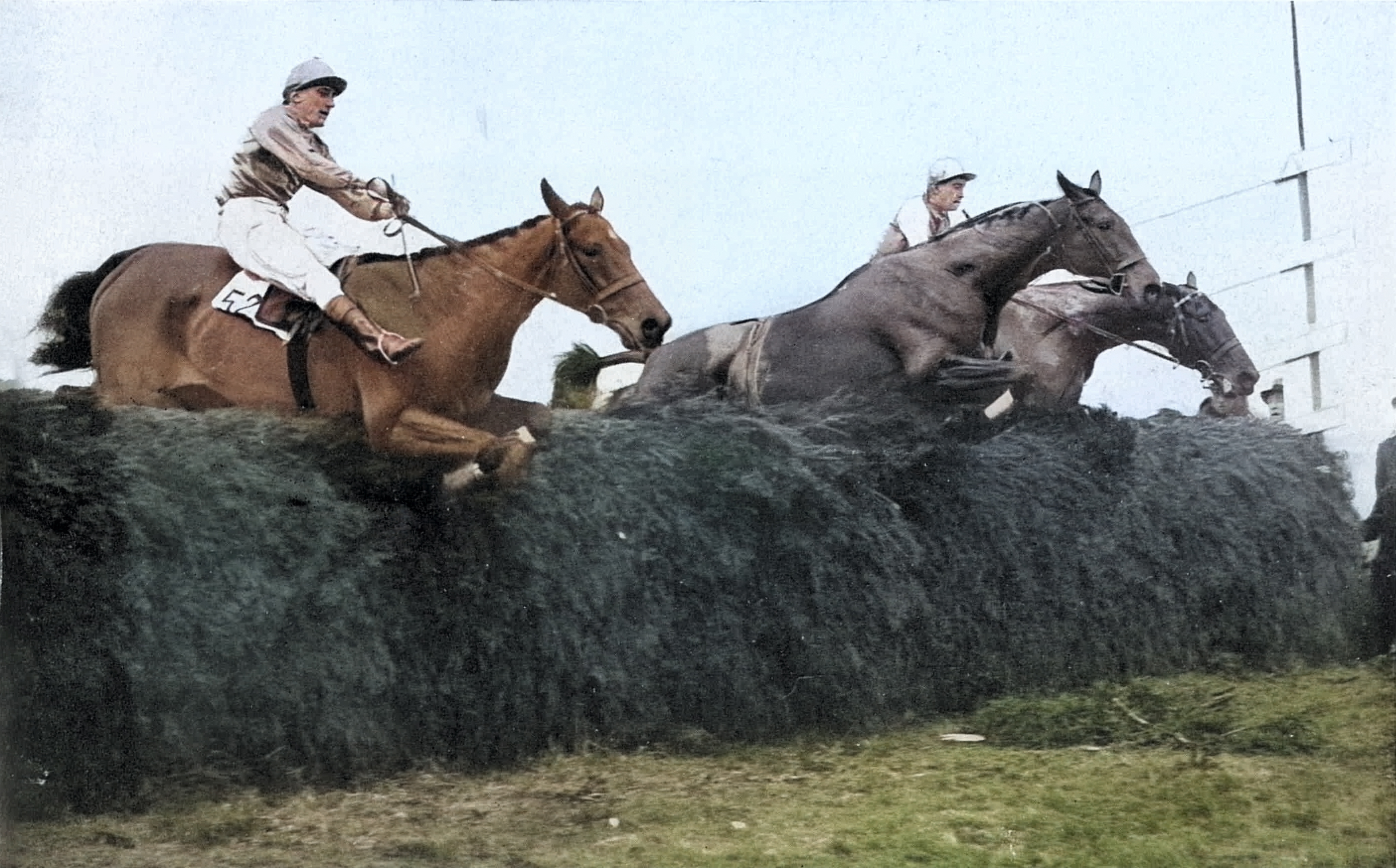
Tipperary Tim (left), Great Span (riderless) and Billy Barton at last fence of 1928 Grand National.

== Finishing order ==
Position	Horse	Jockey	Age	Handicap (st-lb)	SP	Distance
1	Tipperary Tim	Mr. William Dutton	10	10-0	100/1	A distance
2 Remounted	Billy Barton	Tommy Cullinan	10	10-11	33/1	Fell 30, Remounted, last to complete

== Non-finishers ==
Fence	Horse	Jockey	Age	Handicap (st-lb)	SP	Fate
4	Amberwave	Major O'Brien	10	11-13	10/1	Fell
2-5	Bright's Boy	Monty Rayson	9	12-7	20/1	Fell
5	Sprig	Ted Leader	11	12-7	100/7	Fell
5	Rathmore	Mr Lawrence Whitfield	11	10-0	66/1	?
5	The Coyote	James Hogan	8	11-13	40/1	Fell
6	Herbert's Choice	Fred Gurney	7	10-8	50/1	Fell
6	Koko	Bill Gurney	10	12-5	20/1	Fell
8	Easter Hero	Pat Powell	8	12-5	100/7	Fell
8	Drinmond	Barney Balding	11	10-13	33/1	Refused
8	Master Billie	Dick Rees	9	10-8	5/1 F	Refused
27	Maguelonne	Bedeloup	6	10-13	20/1	Fell
29	Great Span	William Payne	7	11-9	33/1	Unseated rider
?	Trump Card	Keith Piggott	10	11-10	11/2	Fell
?	The Ace II	Tommy Morgan	6	11-6	50/1	Refused
?	Grakle	Bob Lyall	6	11-5	33/1	Refused
?	Ballystockart	Cpt Reginald Sassoon	9	11-2	40/1	?
?	Darracq	John Moloney	13	11-2	20/1	?
?	Ardeen	Tim Hamey	11	11-2	40/1	?
?	Eagle's Tail	Eric Foster	9	11-0	50/1	?
?	Rathowen	Henri Deterding	8	11-0	33/1	?
?	Foxtrot	Cpt H Lumsden	12	10-13	100/1	?
?	May King	Lewis Rees	9	10-3	100/1	?
?	Keep Cool	Jack Goswell	13	10-11	66/1	?
?	Spear O'War	Fred Brookes	7	10-10	50/1	?
?	Carfax	Mr Basil Ancil	12	10-10	25/1	?
?	Test Match	J Maloney	10	10-9	66/1	Refused
?	Burgorite	Mr F A Bonsal	13	10-7	200/1	?
?	Mater of Arts	Major Cavanagh	11	10-6	50/1	?
?	Ruddyman	Billy Parvin	9	10-4	66/1	?
?	Scotch Eagle	Mr Harold Fowler	12	10-3	100/1	?
?	Redlynch	Mr West	7	10-3	66/1	?
?	The Gosling	Mr Stratford Dennis	8	10-3	200/1	?
?	Rathory	Dudley Williams	12	10-2	100/1	?
?	Rossieny	Bob Everett	9	10-0	33/1	Fell
?	Melleray's Belle	J P Kelly	9	10-0	200/1	Pulled Up
?	Soldier's Joy	D Quirke	10	10-0	100/1	?
?	De Combat	F Croney	11	10-0	100/1	Fell
?	Commonside	Mr C B Harvey	9	10-0	200/1	?
?	Scraptoft	Mr M Barry	11	10-0	200/1	?
?	Seti The First	Mr E Craig Tanner	13	10-0	40/1	?
