= Dunlop McCosh Cunningham =

Dunlop McCosh Cunningham (20 February 1901–1983) was an Irish rugby player and businessman.

== Early life ==
Cunningham was born in 1901 to his father Samuel Cunningham, a member of the first Stormont Senate, and mother Janet Knox. He was educated at Fettes College, Edinburgh, where he excelled at rugby and became captain of the first XV. After leaving school he entered his uncle's tobacco business, Murray, Sons and Company, at the Whitehall Tobacco Works, Belfast. He played rugby for Ireland and gained 8 caps.

== Tobacco business ==
Dunlop took over his uncle's tobacco business in the mid-1920s; it ran successfully until he sold out in the 1950s. During the Second World War, Dunlop took charge of his brothers' businesses when they went to War and helped the War effort from home, particularly during the troubled times of the Blitz, and with his tobacco products.

== Personal life ==
Dunlop married Kathleen Thomas Cowdy in 1927. Kathleen was honoured with an OBE during the Second World War after her efforts to evacuate thousands of children from the city of Belfast during the Blitz. They had four daughters, Elizabeth, who married Robert Basil Uprichard, (known as Buster), who became Crown Solicitor for Belfast and County Antrim, Janet Knox, who married Sir Dennis Faulkner, the brother of Baron Faulkner of Downpatrick, Alison, who married David Kemp and Christine who married Michael Kemp. Michael and David Kemp are brothers making all of their offspring double cousins.

The family home was Fernhill, in The Shankhill area of Belfast until Dunlop built a new home in the late 1920s, Garnock Hill, on Blacks Road, Belfast.

== Death ==
He died of a heart attack in 1983.
