= The Northern Whig =

Coordinates: 54.601°N 5.928°W

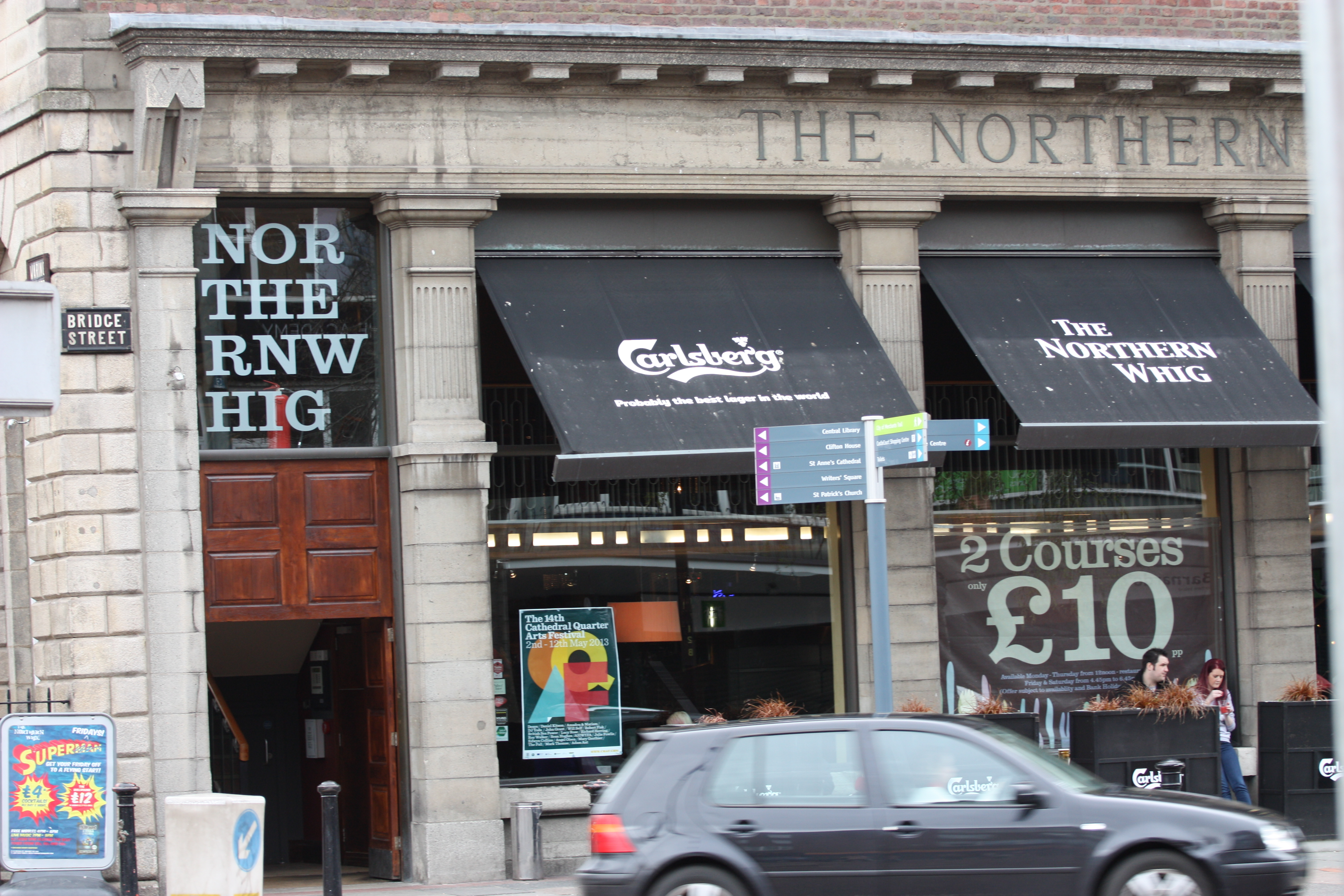
The bar in 2013

The Northern Whig is a bar housed in a historical building at 2-10 Bridge Street in Belfast, Northern Ireland. It is in the Cathedral Quarter, just to the north of the Belfast City Centre. At various times during its history it has been a gentleman's club and a newspaper and is currently a bar owned by the Horatio Group.

Construction began on the building in Bridge Street in 1819. The foundation stone was laid on St. Patrick’s Day, and the building was completed in 1821 as a hotel and gentlemen's club.

== The Northern Whig newspaper and printers ==
In 1823 a newspaper, called the Northern Whig, was founded in Belfast and was owned for a period by John Arnott, founder of the Arnott's department Stores. This newspaper was named after "The Northern Whig Club" which had been formed in Belfast back in 1790. In 1922 the company moved to the building at 2-10 Bridge Street, where they remained until 1963 when the newspaper ceased production. Along with much of nearby High Street, the building was damaged during the Belfast Blitz in 1941. The company then became a commercial printing firm and moved to north Belfast to their present site on the Limestone Road.

== The bar ==
From 1963 until 1997 the building housed offices. In 1997 it was bought by the Mooney family's Botanic Inns and after extensive renovation turned into a bar. The bar featured a number of Soviet-era statues. Originally housed in the Prague Communist Party headquarters, they were commissioned to celebrate the Russian Revolution of 1917.

In April 2016 the Northern Whig Cathedral Quarter Belfast underwent an extensive refurbishment.

In May 2017 the Northern Whig Cathedral Quarter Belfast was awarded Pub of the Year (Northern Ireland) by the National Pub & Bar Awards.

== Poppy discrimination case ==
In November 2012, the Northern Whig achieved notoriety when it refused entry to a former policeman who was wearing a remembrance poppy. Although the owners apologised at the time, the customer took the matter to court, supported by the Equality Commission for Northern Ireland (ECNI). The case was significant for the decision supporting the view of the ECNI that "The poppy, although not directly linked to a specific religious belief or political opinion, would historically have been associated to a greater extent with the Protestant or unionist community in Northern Ireland."
